= Emma Woods =

Canadian ice hockey player (born 1995)

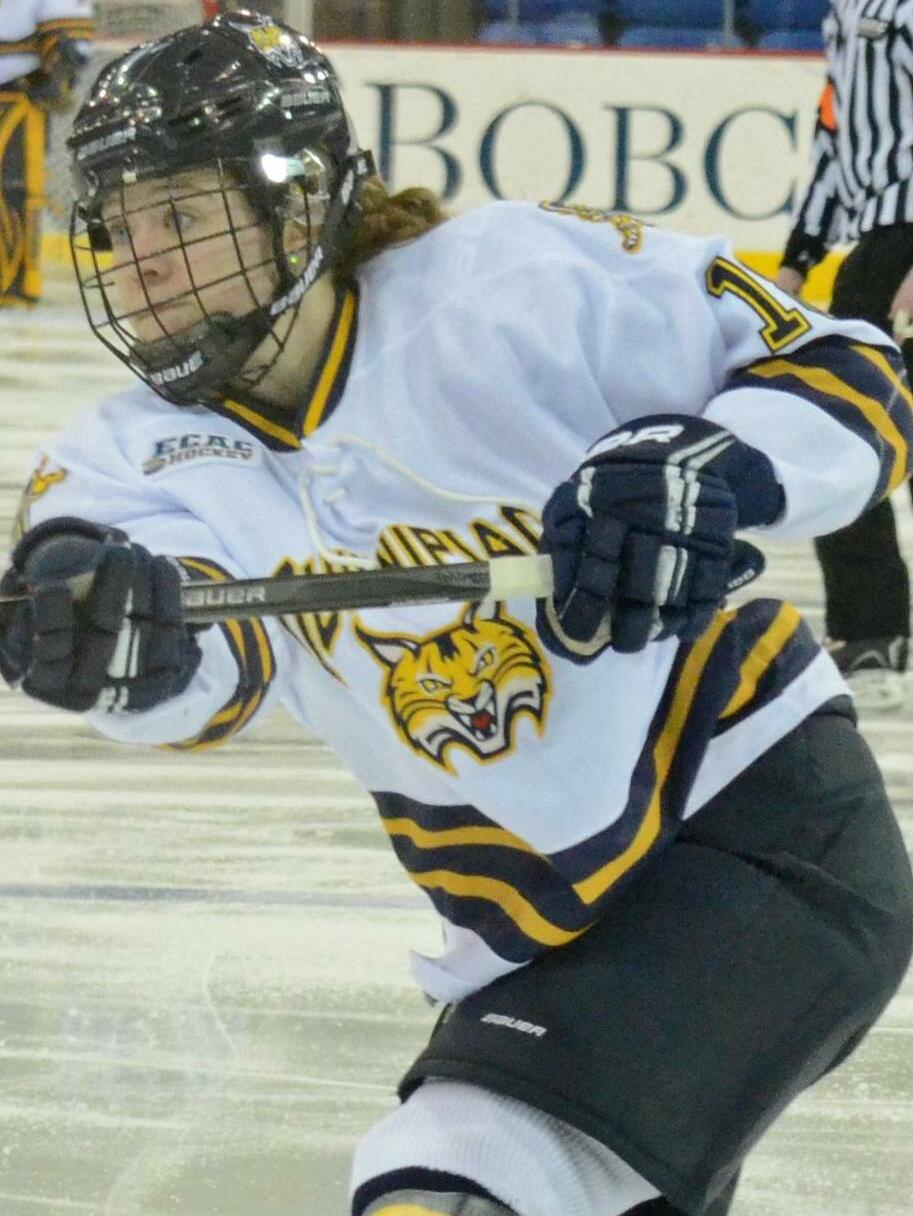
- Woods with the Quinnipiac Bobcats in 2014
- Born: December 18, 1995 (age 30) Burford, Ontario, Canada
- Height: 5 ft 7 in (170 cm)
- Weight: 146 lb (66 kg; 10 st 6 lb)
- Position: Forward
- Shoots: Right
- PWHL team Former teams: Toronto Sceptres: Vanke Rays; Shenzhen KRS Vanke Rays; Leksands IF; Toronto Six; PWHL New York
- Playing career: 2017–present

Emma Woods (born December 18, 1995) is a Canadian professional ice hockey forward for the Toronto Sceptres of the Professional Women's Hockey League (PWHL). She was selected 81st overall by PWHL New York in the 2023 PWHL draft.

== Playing career ==
Growing up in Burford, Ontario, Woods played with the boys' Burford Coyotes until the bantam level, often the only girl on the team. In 2011, Woods was recognised with the Phyllis Gretzky Memorial Award for Female Youth Leadership from the Brantford Sports Council.

Woods played four seasons of NCAA Division I ice hockey with the Quinnipiac Bobcats women's ice hockey program of Quinnipiac University in the ECAC Hockey conference. As a sophomore, she was named to the ECAC All-Academic team and, as a junior, she served as an alternate captain and was named to the All-ECAC Third Team. She served as team captain during her senior season.

=== Professional ===
In 2016, she was drafted in the fourth round, 14th overall by the Buffalo Beauts of the NWHL. In the 2017 CWHL Draft, she was selected in the seventh round, 49th overall by the Vanke Rays, one of two new Canadian Women's Hockey League (CWHL) expansion teams in China. Woods opted to sign with the Vanke Rays for the 2017–18 CWHL season. She remained with the franchise as it merged with the other CWHL team in China, Kunlun Red Star, to become the Shenzhen KRS Vanke Rays for the 2018–19 CWHL season.

In the 2019–20 season, Woods played with Leksands IF of the Swedish Women's Hockey League (SDHL). She tallied 29 points in 35 games – tied with fellow-Canadian Brooke Boquist for second-most on the team.

In June 2020, it was announced that Woods had joined the National Women's Hockey League (NWHL) expansion team, the Toronto Six, making her the seventh player to sign with the organization. The Toronto Six roster included four teammates from Woods' time with the Qunnipiac Bobcats – Kelly Babstock, Sarah-Ève Coutu-Godbout, Shiann Darkangelo, and Emma Greco – in addition to Vanke Rays teammate Elaine Chuli and Leksands IF teammate Brooke Boquist.

The leadership for the inaugural season included Woods, who served as one of the alternate captains with Emma Greco, while Shiann Darkangelo appointed as the first team captain in franchise history. She and Shiann Darkangelo assisted on the first goal scored in Toronto Six franchise history. Scored by Lindsay Eastwood, the goal took place in the second game of the 2020–21 NWHL season and was scored against Minnesota Whitecaps goaltender Amanda Leveille.

Woods re-signed with the Toronto Six for the 2023–24 season on June 26, 2023. The Premier Hockey Federation (PHF) was bought out and dissolved three days later, on June 29, 2023, and her contract was voided. Woods subsequently declared her eligibility for the Professional Women's Hockey League (PWHL), the league which replaced the PHF. She was selected in the fourteenth round, 81st overall by PWHL New York in the inaugural PWHL draft on September 18, 2023. Over the course of the season, she would score two goals and five points as New York's second line center.

On June 21, 2024, the opening day of free agency for the 2024–25 season, Woods signed a two-year contract with Toronto.

== Personal life ==
Woods was born December 18, 1995, in London, Ontario. She grew up in Burford, Ontario, with her older sister, Rebecca, twin brother Calvin, and younger brother, Hayden.

She attended Paris District High School for her secondary education, where she participated in varsity ice hockey, volleyball, junior basketball, soccer, tennis, track and field, badminton, and baseball. During her high school career, she won county-level championships in badminton, tennis, and baseball, (Note: Organized by the Brant County Secondary Schools' Athletic Association (BCSSAA)) won the regional championship in tennis, (Note: Organized by the Central Western Ontario Secondary Schools Athletics (CWOSSA)) and competed at the provincial-level for ice hockey and tennis. (Note: Overseen by the Ontario Federation of School Athletic Associations (OFSSA)) Woods was three-time MVP of the ice hockey team and twice served as team captain. She was named the Paris District Senior Female Athlete of the Year in 2013.

== Career statistics ==
			Regular season					Playoffs
Season	Team	League	GP	G	A	Pts	PIM	GP	G	A	Pts	PIM
2011–12	Kitchener-Waterloo Jr. Rangers	Prov. WHL	34	7	7	14	20	4	0	2	2	0
2012–13	Cambridge Rivulettes	Prov. WHL	35	10	14	24	37	10	0	7	7	4
2013–14	Quinnipiac Bobcats	NCAA	37	13	12	25	10	—	—	—	—	—
2014–15	Quinnipiac Bobcats	NCAA	38	11	13	24	4	—	—	—	—	—
2015–16	Quinnipiac Bobcats	NCAA	38	11	23	34	20	—	—	—	—	—
2016–17	Quinnipiac Bobcats	NCAA	36	12	11	23	22	—	—	—	—	—
2017–18	Vanke Rays	CWHL	28	9	10	19	18	—	—	—	—	—
2018–19	Shenzhen KRS Vanke Rays	CWHL	28	8	8	16	20	—	—	—	—	—
2019–20	Leksands IF	SDHL	35	10	19	29	18	2	1	0	1	4
2020–21	Toronto Six	NWHL	4	0	4	4	0	1	0	0	0	0
2021–22	Toronto Six	PHF	20	9	9	18	18	1	0	0	0	0
2022–23	Toronto Six	PHF	24	10	13	23	6	4	2	1	3	2
2023–24	PWHL New York	PWHL	24	2	3	5	8	—	—	—	—	—
2024–25	Toronto Sceptres	PWHL	30	3	1	4	14	4	0	2	2	0
2025–26	Toronto Sceptres	PWHL	30	1	1	2	8	—	—	—	—	—
PWHL totals			84	6	5	11	30	—	—	—	—	—

== Awards and honors ==
Award	Year
NCAA
Nutmeg Classic Most Outstanding Player	2014
ECAC Hockey All-Academic Team	2014–15
All-ECAC Hockey Third Team	2015–16
Quinnipiac Scholar-Athlete	2015–16
Other
Phyllis Gretzky Memorial Award	2011
Paris District Senior Female Athlete of the Year	2013
