= Mike Eastwood =

Canadian ice hockey player

- Born: July 1, 1967 (age 58) Ottawa, Ontario, Canada
- Height: 6 ft 3 in (191 cm)
- Weight: 216 lb (98 kg; 15 st 6 lb)
- Position: Centre
- Shot: Right
- Played for: Toronto Maple Leafs; Winnipeg Jets; Phoenix Coyotes; New York Rangers; St. Louis Blues; Chicago Blackhawks; Pittsburgh Penguins
- NHL draft: 91st overall, 1987; Toronto Maple Leafs
- Playing career: 1991–2004

Michael Barry Eastwood (born July 1, 1967) is a Canadian former professional ice hockey player. Eastwood played 13 seasons in the National Hockey League for the Toronto Maple Leafs, Winnipeg Jets, Phoenix Coyotes, New York Rangers, St. Louis Blues, Chicago Blackhawks and Pittsburgh Penguins

== Playing career ==
As a youth, Eastwood played in the 1979 Quebec International Pee-Wee Hockey Tournament with a minor ice hockey team from South Ottawa.

Eastwood was drafted in the fifth Round, 91st overall by the Toronto Maple Leafs in the 1987 NHL entry draft. He then played four seasons with Western Michigan University of the CCHA. He played 164 games for Western Michigan, scoring 69 goals and adding 80 assists for 149 points. His best season was his last one when he had 29 goals and 32 assists in 42 games. In 1991, Eastwood made the jump to pro hockey. He did not become an NHL regular though until two years later.

In 1995, Eastwood was traded to the Winnipeg Jets for Tie Domi. This started a trend for Eastwood as he would then go on to play for many different teams. In his career, he has played 783 NHL games, scoring 87 goals and adding 149 assists for 236 points. His best season came in 1999–2000, when he scored 19 goals and 15 assists for 34 points.

== Post-playing career ==
After his retirement in 2004, Eastwood was sought out by sports radio producers in the Ottawa area for his perspective on the NHL. He formerly co-hosted Ottawa Senators post-game shows with Scott MacArthur, and has appeared in radio commercials for restaurants in the Ottawa area. He currently serves as an Assistant Coach for the Ottawa 67's in the Ontario Hockey League.

== Career statistics ==
			Regular season					Playoffs
Season	Team	League	GP	G	A	Pts	PIM	GP	G	A	Pts	PIM
1984–85	Nepean Raiders	CJHL	46	10	13	23	18	—	—	—	—	—
1985–86	Nepean Raiders	CJHL	7	4	2	6	6	—	—	—	—	—
1986–87	Pembroke Lumber Kings	CJHL	54	58	45	103	62	23	36	11	47	32
1987–88	Western Michigan University	CCHA	42	5	8	13	14	—	—	—	—	—
1988–89	Western Michigan University	CCHA	40	10	13	23	87	—	—	—	—	—
1989–90	Western Michigan University	CCHA	40	25	27	52	36	—	—	—	—	—
1990–91	Western Michigan University	CCHA	42	29	32	61	84	—	—	—	—	—
1991–92	St. John's Maple Leafs	AHL	61	18	25	43	28	16	9	10	19	16
1991–92	Toronto Maple Leafs	NHL	9	0	2	2	4	—	—	—	—	—
1992–93	St. John's Maple Leafs	AHL	60	24	35	59	32	—	—	—	—	—
1992–93	Toronto Maple Leafs	NHL	12	1	6	7	21	10	1	2	3	8
1993–94	Toronto Maple Leafs	NHL	54	8	10	18	28	18	3	2	5	12
1994–95	Toronto Maple Leafs	NHL	36	5	5	10	32	—	—	—	—	—
1994–95	Winnipeg Jets	NHL	13	3	6	9	4	—	—	—	—	—
1995–96	Winnipeg Jets	NHL	80	14	14	28	20	6	0	1	1	2
1996–97	Phoenix Coyotes	NHL	33	1	3	4	4	—	—	—	—	—
1996–97	New York Rangers	NHL	27	1	7	8	10	15	1	2	3	22
1997–98	New York Rangers	NHL	48	5	5	10	16	—	—	—	—	—
1997–98	St. Louis Blues	NHL	10	1	0	1	6	3	1	0	1	0
1998–99	St. Louis Blues	NHL	82	9	21	30	36	13	1	1	2	6
1999–2000	St. Louis Blues	NHL	79	19	15	34	32	7	1	1	2	6
2000–01	St. Louis Blues	NHL	77	6	17	23	28	15	0	2	2	2
2001–02	St. Louis Blues	NHL	71	7	10	17	41	10	0	0	0	6
2002–03	St. Louis Blues	NHL	17	1	3	4	8	—	—	—	—	—
2002–03	Chicago Blackhawks	NHL	53	2	10	12	24	—	—	—	—	—
2003–04	Pittsburgh Penguins	NHL	82	4	15	19	40	—	—	—	—	—
NHL totals			783	87	149	236	354	97	8	11	19	64

== Awards and honours ==
Award	Year
All-CCHA Second Team	1990-91
CCHA All-Tournament Team	1991

== Personal life ==
In June 2020, his niece Lindsay Eastwood, signed her first professional contract with the Toronto Six, the first Canadian expansion team in the NWHL. She scored her first professional goal against Amanda Leveille in the second game of the 2020–21 NWHL season, the first goal in the Six franchise history. The assists on Eastwood's historic goal were credited to Emma Woods and Shiann Darkangelo.
