= Lindsay Eastwood =

Canadian ice hockey player (born 1997)

- Born: January 14, 1997 (age 29) Kanata, Ontario, Canada
- Height: 6 ft 1 in (185 cm)
- Position: Defence
- Shot: Left
- Played for: Toronto Six; Syracuse Orange
- National team: Canada
- Playing career: 2015–2023
Medal record
World U18 Championships
Silver medal – second place	2015 United States

Lindsay Eastwood (born January 14, 1997) is a retired Canadian ice hockey defender, having played for the Toronto Six in the Premier Hockey Federation (PHF) from 2020 to 2023. The Syracuse Orange all-time leader in goals scored among defenders, she scored the first goal in Six history. She was a member of the Six roster that won the 2023 Isobel Cup championship, representing the last championship team of the PHF.

== Playing career ==
Born and raised in Kanata, Ontario, Eastwood began playing hockey at the age of six. She played junior hockey for the Nepean Wildcats in the Provincial Women's Hockey League (PWHL), serving as team captain and finishing as one of the top five all-time league scorers among defenceman.

She would go on to play NCAA Division I women's ice hockey for the Syracuse Orange of College Hockey America, putting up 75 points in 135 games. She was forced to sit out her first year at the university after being diagnosed with antiphospholipid syndrome, an autoimmune disorder. In that season, she began training as a rower, but was able to return to hockey for the 2016–17 season. In 2018, she was named Syracuse captain, and led the team to victory at the 2019 CHA Women's Ice Hockey Tournament, the programme's first ever conference championship win. In her final university season, she won the CHA Best Defenseman Award and the Doris R. Soladay Award, setting a programme record for most career goals by a defenceman.

=== Professional ===
In June 2020, she signed her first professional contract with the Toronto Six, the first Canadian expansion team in the NWHL. She scored her first professional goal against Amanda Leveille in the second game of the 2020–21 NWHL season, the first goal in the Six franchise history. The assists on Eastwood's historic goal were credited to Emma Woods and Shiann Darkangelo. Following three seasons with the Six, during which she was named a league all-star in 2022 and won the Isobel Cup in 2023, Eastwood announced her retirement from professional hockey and joined the Kitchener Rangers as their Manager of Communications and Team Services.

== International career ==
Eastwood played for Team Canada at the 2015 IIHF World Women's U18 Championship, joining a team that included future NWHLers Carly Jackson, Alyson Matteau, and future Toronto Six teammate Sarah-Ève Coutu-Godbout, in addition to future Canadian women's national team players Sarah Potomak and Micah Hart, and many other standout players. The team won silver after falling in the gold medal game to Team USA in overtime.

== Style of play ==
Mostly described as a more offensive defender, Eastwood has been noted for her size, reach, and the strength of her shot. She has stated that "my speed is one of my biggest insecurities as a player."

== Personal life ==
Eastwood holds two degrees from Syracuse University, a bachelor's in communication and rhetorical studies from the College of Visual and Performing Arts and a master's degree in television, radio and film from the S. I. Newhouse School of Public Communications. She covered the 2020 Stanley Cup playoffs as a correspondent for the Tampa Bay Times and will be covering her experiences inside the 2020–21 NWHL COVID-19 bubble season for Sportsnet.

Her uncle, Mike Eastwood, played over 700 game in the men's National Hockey League in the 1990s and early 2000s.

== Career statistics ==
			Regular season					Playoffs
Season	Team	League	GP	G	A	Pts	PIM	GP	G	A	Pts	PIM
2015-16	Syracuse University	NCAA	–	–	–	–	–	–	–	–	–	–
2016-17	Syracuse University	NCAA	34	2	8	10	16	–	–	–	–	–
2017-18	Syracuse University	NCAA	36	4	19	23	30	–	–	–	–	–
2018-19	Syracuse University	NCAA	33	9	5	14	26	–	–	–	–	–
2019-20	Syracuse University	NCAA	33	8	20	28	26	–	–	–	–	–
2020-21	Toronto Six	NWHL	6	1	5	6	4	1	0	0	0	0
2021-22	Toronto Six	PHF	20	3	11	14	16	1	0	0	0	0
2022-23	Toronto Six	PHF	24	0	8	8	24	4	0	2	2	2
NWHL/PHF totals			50	4	24	28	44	6	0	2	2	2
