= Sami Jo Small =

Canadian ice hockey goaltender

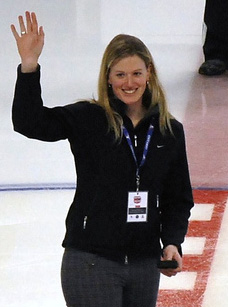
- Born: Samantha Small; March 25, 1976 (age 50) Winnipeg, Manitoba, Canada
- Height: 5 ft 8 in (173 cm)
- Weight: 179 lb (81 kg; 12 st 11 lb)
- Position: Goaltender
- Caught: Left
- Played for: Toronto Furies; Mississauga Chiefs; Brampton Thunder
- National team: Canada
- Playing career: 1997–2018
- Website: www.samijosmall.ca
Medal record
Representing Canada
Women's ice hockey
Olympic Games
| Gold medal – first place | 2002 Salt Lake City | Tournament |
World Championship
| Gold medal – first place | 1999 Finland | Tournament |
| Gold medal – first place | 2000 Canada | Tournament |
| Gold medal – first place | 2001 United States | Tournament |
| Gold medal – first place | 2004 Canada | Tournament |

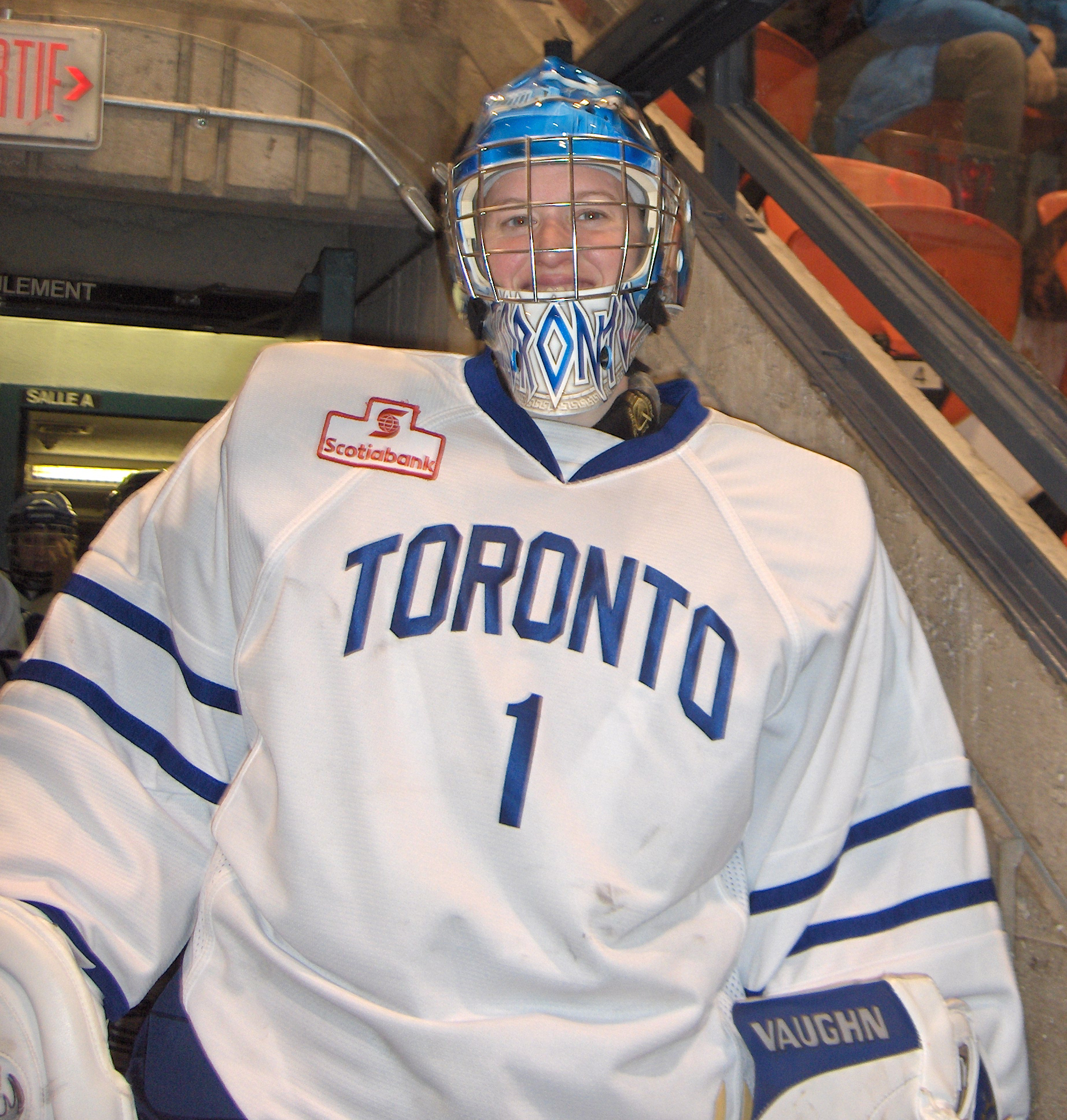
Small with the Toronto Furies in 2012

Sami Jo Small (born March 25, 1976) is a retired Canadian ice hockey goaltender. As a member of the Canadian national team, she was an Olympic gold medallist and four-time World Championship medallist. One of the founders of the now defunct Canadian Women's Hockey League (CWHL), she served in the role of vice-chair during the league's inaugural season and went on to play ten seasons in the league. She was the team president of the Toronto Six before the Premier Hockey Federation ceased operations in 2023.

== Playing career ==
Small competed for Team Manitoba at the 1991 Canada Winter Games.

=== Stanford University ===
Small is a graduate of Collège Jeanne-Sauvé and attended Stanford University on a track and field scholarship for the discus throw, hammer throw, and javelin throw events. While at Stanford, she also played on the Cardinal men's club hockey team. At the 1997 Pacific-10 Track and Field championships, held May 24–25, 1997, Small finished in fifth place in the hammer throw with a distance of 161.5 ft (49.2 m) and placed seventh in discus throw with a distance of 158.8 ft (48.4 m).

=== CWHL ===
Small was a goaltender for the Mississauga Chiefs of the Canadian Women's Hockey League. After the CWHL contracted in 2010, she was claimed by the Toronto Furies. With Toronto, Small participated in the championship game of the 2011 Clarkson Cup. Despite losing to the Montreal Stars by a 5-0 tally, Small accumulated 46 saves in the championship. On February 9, 2014, in a victory against the defending Clarkson Cup champion Boston Blades, Small achieved her the 60th victory of her CWHL career, the first CWHL goaltender to reach the 60-win plateau. In that same season, Small would win the 2014 Clarkson Cup, making her the third women's ice hockey goaltender to have won Winter Games gold, IIHF gold and the Clarkson.

== International play ==
Small is an Olympic champion, and four-time world champion goalie for the Canadian national women's ice hockey team. Acting as a third goaltender on the Canadian women's hockey team at Turin and Nagano, she served as a backup to Kim St. Pierre at the Ice hockey at the 2002 Winter Olympics – Women's tournament, which saw Canada win its first-ever Olympic gold medal in women's ice hockey.

== Management ==
On June 11, 2018, Small was named general manager of the Toronto Furies. One of her first moves in the position was signing Courtney Kessel (née Birchard) as their new head coach and appointing long-time coach Ken Dufton as an advisor to the organization.

Among the free agents signed by Small leading into her first season as GM included goaltender Elaine Chuli and forward Shiann Darkangelo to contracts in August 2018. With the second overall pick at the 2018 CWHL Draft, her first draft as general manager, Small selected forward Sarah Nurse. Four spots later, she would claim goaltender Shea Tiley, who led the Clarkson Golden Knights women's ice hockey program to a pair of NCAA Frozen Four championships.

In September 2022, Small joined the PHF as team president of the Toronto Six.

=== Other ===
Small published her autobiography, titled "The Role I Played: Canada’s Greatest Olympic Hockey Team," with ECW Press in September 2020.

Hosting a podcast in conjunction with Sports Illustrated and The Hockey News, Sami Jo's Podcast: Building a Stronger Team, began in February 2021. Speaking to talks to elite players and coaches, deciphering the elements of a successful team, another focus involves discussion on the numerous facets of making one a better player and teammate.

In 2022, Small appeared on an episode of Canadian comedy show Letterkenny as herself.

==== Podcast Episode guide ====
- Ep 001 (2021-02-14) Cheryl Pounder
- Ep 002 (2021-02-28) Roberta Bartolo
- Ep 003 (2021-03-15) Jennifer Botterill
- Ep 004 (2021-03-28) Susie Yuen
- Ep 005 (2021-04-11) Daniele Sauvageau
- Ep 006 (2021-04-25) Natalie Spooner
- Ep 007 (2021-05-09) Becky Kellar
- Ep 008 (2021-05-24) Wally Kozak
- Ep 009 (2021-06-21) Cassie Campbell-Pascall

== Personal life ==
Small graduated from Stanford University in 1999, with a degree in mechanical engineering sub-specializing in product design.

She is involved with several advocacy organizations and has been an Athlete Ambassador with Right To Play since 2006.

Small is married to Billy Bridges, a fifteen-year veteran forward on the Canadian men's national ice sledge hockey team and three time Winter Paralympic Games medalist. They have a daughter named Kensi.

== Career statistics ==
| Year | Team | Event | Result | GP | W | L | T/OT | MIN | GA | SO | GAA | SV% |
|---|---|---|---|---|---|---|---|---|---|---|---|---|
| 2002 | Canada | OG | 1st place, gold medalist(s) | 1 | 1 | 0 | 0 | 60:00 | 0 | 1 | 0.00 | 1.000 |

== Awards and honours ==
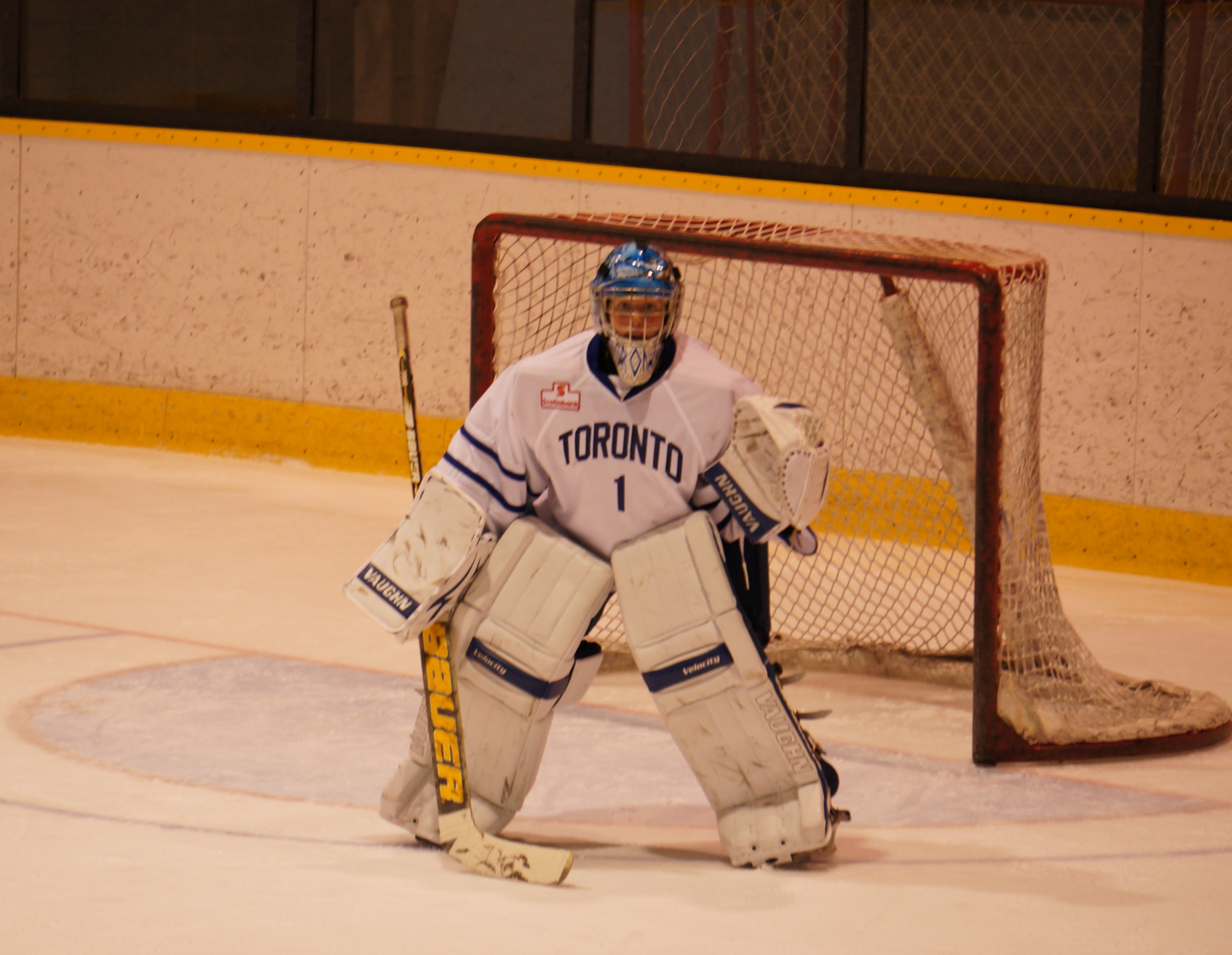
Small in net for the Furies in a match against Les Canadiennes de Montréal, January 2011

- Stanford University Men's Hockey, Pac-8 Conference (ACHA) MVP
- CWHL Second All-Star Team, 2008–09 and 2009–10
- Brampton Sports Hall of Fame, 2002
- Directorate Award, Best Goalie, 1999 IIHF Women's World Championship
- Directorate Award, Best Goalie, 2000 IIHF Women's World Championship
- Namesake, "Sami Jo Small Hockey Facility" at the Norberry-Glenlee Community Centre in St. Vital, Winnipeg, Manitoba
