= Breanne Wilson-Bennett =

Canadian ice hockey player

- Born: March 5, 1996 (age 30) Markham, Ontario, Canada
- Height: 5 ft 4 in (163 cm)
- Weight: 139 lb (63 kg; 9 st 13 lb)
- Position: Forward
- Shoots: Left
- PHF team Former teams: Toronto Six; Modo Hockey; Colgate Raiders
- National team: Canada
- Playing career: 2014–present

Breanne Wilson-Bennett (born March 5, 1996) is a Canadian ice hockey forward, currently playing with the Toronto Six of the Premier Hockey Federation (PHF), formerly the National Women's Hockey League (NWHL).

== Career ==
Wilson-Bennett began playing hockey at the age of four, playing in her family's backyard rink before her mother registered her for the Timbits hockey program. During high school, she played four seasons with the Bill Crothers Secondary School women's ice hockey team in addition to playing with the Toronto Jr. Aeros of the Provincial Women's Hockey League (PWHL) in her junior and senior years, serving as team captain in the 2013–14 season.

=== NCAA ===
From 2014 to 2018, Wilson-Bennett played with the Colgate Raiders women's ice hockey program of the ECAC Hockey conference, scoring 101 points in 147 NCAA Division I games. She scored her first collegiate goal in her first collegiate game, a 2–1 loss to the Syracuse Orange. In 2017–18, she was named to the All-NCAA Tournament Team and to the All-USCHO Second Team. She scored a hat-trick, including the game-winning double-overtime goal, in the 2018 Frozen Four semifinals to lead Colgate into the finals for the first time in history.

=== Professional ===
After graduating, she signed her first professional contract with Modo Hockey Dam of the Swedish Women's Hockey League (SDHL) along with Colgate teammate Lauren Wildfang. In November 2018, she suffered a serious concussion, receiving treatment on the ice for 20 minutes before being taken to the hospital. She was allowed to return home the next day, but missed the rest of the season. She finished the 2018–19 SDHL season with 20 points in 21 games.

She returned to North America to sign with the expansion Toronto Six ahead of the 2020–21 NWHL season.

In a January 24, 2021 contest versus the 2019 Clarkson Cup champion Minnesota Whitecaps, Wilson-Bennett logged the first multi-goal effort in franchise history, recognized as the Second Star of the Game.

== International career ==
Wilson-Bennett represented Canada at the 2014 IIHF World Women's U18 Championship, picking up two points in five games as the country won gold.

== Personal life ==
Wilson-Bennett was also a member of the Colgate Raiders track and field team while attending Colgate University. She has been diagnosed with type 1 diabetes.

== Career statistics ==
			Regular Season					Playoffs
Season	Team	League	GP	G	A	Pts	PIM	GP	G	A	Pts	PIM
2018-19	Modo Hockey	SDHL	21	8	12	20	4	-	-	-	-	-
2020-2021	Toronto Six	NWHL	6	2	2	4	2	1	1	1	2	0
2021-2022	Toronto Six	PHF	6	5	1	6	6	1	1	0	1	2
SDHL totals			21	8	12	20	4	-	-	-	-	-
PHF totals			12	7	3	10	8	2	2	1	3	2

Source: SDHL, NWHL/PHF
