= Carly Jackson =

Canadian ice hockey player (born 1997)

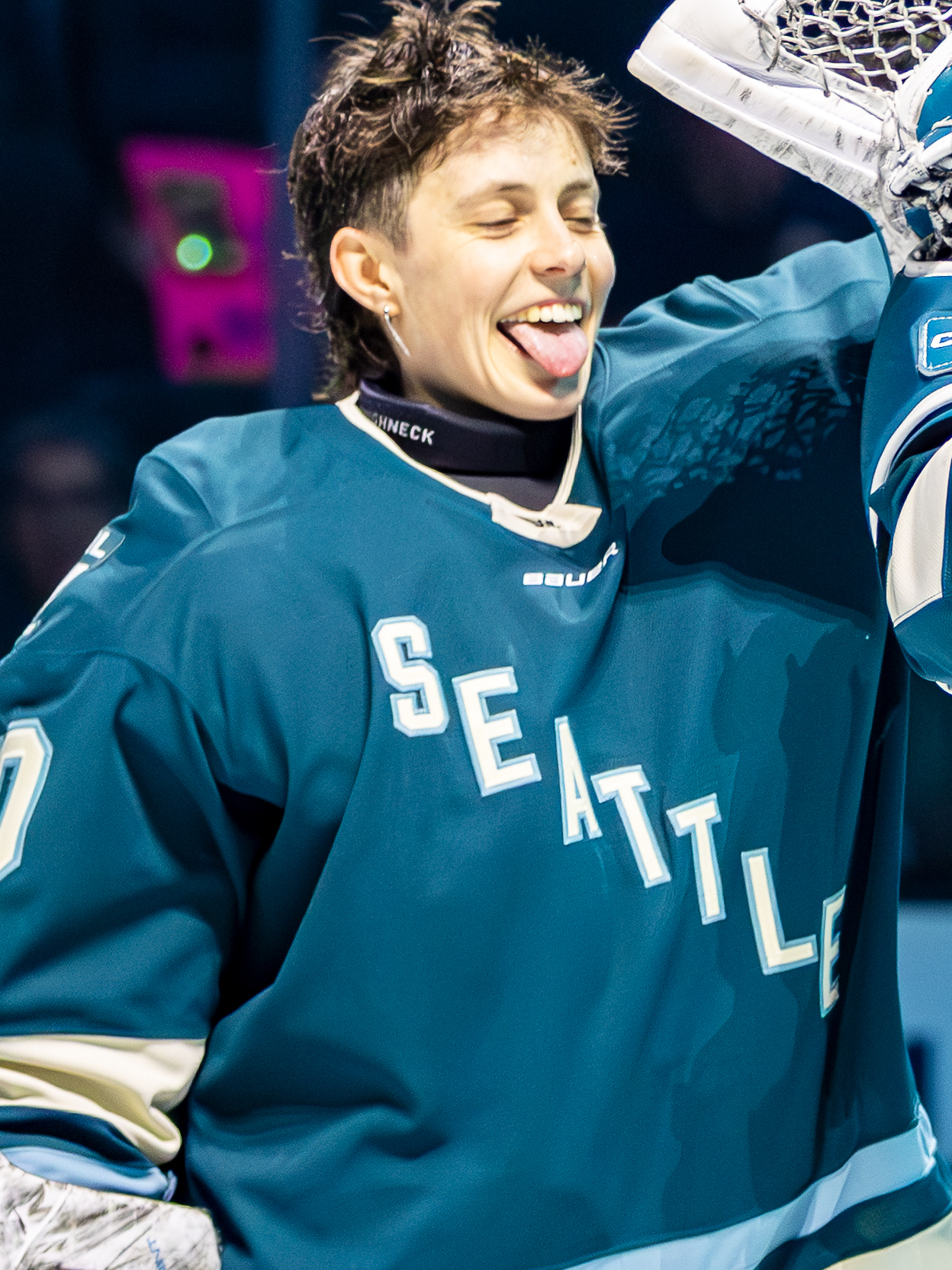
- Jackson with the Seattle Torrent in 2026
- Born: June 23, 1997 (age 29) Amherst, Nova Scotia, Canada
- Height: 165 cm (5 ft 5 in)
- Position: Goaltender
- PWHL team Former teams: Seattle Torrent: Toronto Six; Buffalo Beauts; Toronto Sceptres
- Playing career: 2015–present

Carly Jane "CJ" Jackson (born June 23, 1997) is a Canadian ice hockey player who is a goaltender. They currently play for the Seattle Torrent of the Professional Women's Hockey League (PWHL)

Jackson played collegiate hockey for the University of Maine Black Bears from 2016 to 2020, graduating as the program's all-time leader in wins, save percentage, shutouts, and goals-against average.

Jackson has played professionally for the Buffalo Beauts, Toronto Six, and PWHL Toronto (later the Toronto Sceptres). Selected third overall by the Beauts in the 2020 National Women's Hockey League (NWHL) draft, Jackson won the Isobel Cup championship with the Toronto Six in 2022–23 and was voted as one of the Fans' Three Stars of the Season twice (2020–21, 2022–23). After two seasons with PWHL Toronto (2023–25), Jackson signed with the expansion Seattle Torrent on July 9, 2025.

Internationally, Jackson represented Canada at the 2015 IIHF World Women's U18 Championship, winning a silver medal.

== Early life ==
Born in Amherst, Nova Scotia, Jackson grew up in the nearby community of Hastings and comes from a blended family with two mothers and two fathers. Jackson's father was a role model who played beer league hockey in Nova Scotia. When Jackson expressed interest in playing hockey, their father insisted they first learn to skate and enrolled them in CanSkate. Jackson's first day on the ice did not go well: "I hated it, and I cried, and I was like, 'I wanna get off the ice!' and he was like, 'Nope, go back out there, you got to finish what you sign up for.' And so I finished out the year at Canskate and then he helped me learn to play hockey."

Jackson initially played as a forward, but their team rotated players through the goaltending position. After playing one game in net, Jackson was hooked on the position. That night, their father came into their room to check on them and discovered "this huge lump in the bed"—Jackson had fallen asleep wearing all of their goalie gear. "The choice had been made," Jackson later recalled. During their youth, Jackson played for the Cumberland Blues of the Nova Scotia Junior Hockey League. They also represented Team Nova Scotia at the U18 level, winning a gold medal at the Atlantic Challenge Cup. Jackson competed internationally with Canada's U18 women's team, winning a silver medal at the IIHF World Women's U18 Championship. Growing up, Jackson played baseball alongside hockey. Having competed in both sports during their childhood, Jackson has been noted for the strength of their glove hand, as well as their speed and stamina.

== Playing career ==
=== Collegiate ===
Jackson attended the University of Maine and played for the Black Bears women's ice hockey team from 2016 to 2020. They redshirted during their first year with the program in 2015–16, practicing with the team but maintaining an extra year of eligibility. In their freshman season, Jackson appeared in 27 games for the Black Bears, making 25 starts and posting a 7–19–1 record. They recorded a .911 save percentage and 2.84 goals-against average. Jackson had nine games with 30 or more saves, including a season-high 42 saves against Boston College on October 8 and 41 saves against Boston University on November 12. They earned their first career shutout with 27 saves against UConn on February 11, 2017. Jackson was named to the Hockey East All-Academic Team and received the Maine Scholar Athlete Bronze Medal.

External videos
- Carly Jackson, Maine Black Bears retrieved December 29, 2025

As a sophomore, Jackson started 34 out of 35 games played, finishing with a 17–12–5 record. They posted a .924 save percentage and 1.95 goals-against average, recording three shutouts against Northeastern (November 19), Vermont (December 2), and New Hampshire (February 3). Jackson recorded a season-high 45 saves against UConn on January 26, 2018. With 17 wins, Jackson set the single-season program record for wins by a Maine goaltender, breaking the previous mark. They were named a Women's Hockey East Association (WHEA) All-Star Honorable Mention and Hockey East Defensive Player of the Week on January 8, 2018. Jackson received the Maine Scholar Athlete Silver Medal. In their junior season, Jackson appeared in 28 games, starting 27 of them, and finished with a 9–13–5 record. They posted a .920 save percentage and 2.07 goals-against average while allowing 54 goals on 623 saves. Jackson registered three shutouts during the season: a 26-save performance against Boston University on January 5, a 15-save shutout against Holy Cross on January 12, and a 21-save shutout against UConn on January 26. They recorded a season-high 40 saves in a victory over Harvard on December 7, 2018.

Jackson's senior season saw them post career-best numbers with a 1.90 goals-against average and .934 save percentage. During the season, Jackson achieved the highest GPA (3.92) as an active member of the University of Maine women's ice hockey team during the fall and spring semesters. Upon graduating, Jackson left Maine as the program's all-time leader in multiple statistical categories: wins ( 45), saves (3,029), save percentage (.923), shutouts (12), and goals-against average: 2.15. Jackson's four-year collegiate career established them as one of the most successful goaltenders in University of Maine women's hockey history.

=== Professional ===
==== Buffalo Beauts (2020–2022) ====
In April 2020, Jackson was selected third overall by the Buffalo Beauts in the National Women's Hockey League (NWHL) draft. The announcement was made via video message by Hockey Hall of Famer Pat LaFontaine, the third overall pick in the 1983 NHL entry draft. A few days after the draft, they signed their first professional contract with the team for the 2020–21 season. Jackson became the highest NWHL draft pick in University of Maine women's ice hockey history.

Jackson made their professional debut on January 23, 2021, stopping 43 saves in a 2–1 shootout loss to the Connecticut Whale in the opening game of the season. The following day, they made 35 saves in a 5–1 loss to the Boston Pride, including 17 saves in the second period when the Pride recorded 20 shots on goal. Due to the COVID-19 pandemic, the 2020–21 NWHL season was condensed into a two-week period held in a bubble at Herb Brooks Arena in Lake Placid, New York. Jackson started all six games for the Beauts, facing at least 37 shots in five of those six games, including three games where they faced 40 or more shots. They finished the season with a .909 save percentage and led all Lake Placid goaltenders in minutes played, shots faced, and saves. They were selected as the Beauts' representative for the NWHL Foundation Award, recognizing players who apply the core values of hockey to their community, particularly for their efforts with youth hockey players and support of those facing marginalization. Jackson was also voted as one of the Fans' Three Stars of the Season, sharing the honor with Mikyla Grant-Mentis and Mallory Souliotis.

Jackson re-signed with the Beauts for the 2021–22 season and was named an alternate captain. They started 17 games during the season, posting a 6–11–0 record with a .903 save percentage and 3.25 goals-against average. Despite the team's struggles, Jackson was named the Buffalo Beauts' Most Valuable Player for the 2021–22 season.

==== Toronto Six (2022–2023) ====
On June 22, 2022, one day before their 25th birthday, Jackson signed a one-year contract worth $60,000 with the Toronto Six for the 2022–23 season. The move came as a surprise to many, including Jackson, as it initially appeared they would return to Buffalo. Jackson served as the backup to Elaine Chuli, the 2022 PHF Goaltender of the Year. In six regular season appearances, Jackson posted a perfect 5–0–0 record with career-best statistics: a .926 save percentage and 1.90 goals-against average. Chuli started 19 of the team's 24 regular season games, while Jackson started five. The Six finished the regular season in second place with a 17–5–2 record. In the playoffs, Chuli started all games as Toronto defeated the Connecticut Whale in the semifinals before facing the Minnesota Whitecaps in the Isobel Cup Final. On March 27, 2023, Tereza Vanišová scored 4:23 into overtime to give the Six a 4–3 victory over Minnesota, capturing the franchise's first Isobel Cup championship and making them the first Canadian franchise to win the title. Following the championship season, Jackson was voted as one of the Fans' Three Stars of the Season for 2022–23, receiving the honor alongside Boston's Loren Gabel and Buffalo's Dominique Kremer—Jackson's second time receiving this recognition in three years.

==== Toronto Sceptres (2023–2025) ====
After going undrafted in the 2023 PWHL Draft, Jackson signed with PWHL Toronto following their 2023 training camp as a camp invitee. During the inaugural 2023–24 PWHL season, they served as the team's third goaltender behind Kristen Campbell and Raygan Kirk, dressing for only one game without entering play.

On July 9, 2024, Jackson signed a one-year contract extension with Toronto, now branded as the Toronto Sceptres. Jackson again served as the team's third goaltender, though they remained a fan favorite and popular figure within the organization despite limited playing time. On April 29, 2025, with Toronto on a two-game losing streak and having already clinched a playoff berth, head coach Troy Ryan gave Jackson their first PWHL start against the New York Sirens. Jackson made 25 saves in a 2–1 shootout victory, stopping all four shots they faced in the shootout while Natalie Spooner scored the winner. The victory was celebrated by teammates "like a championship game," according to Ryan, who noted that Jackson's personality and impact on team morale made it "one of the most important wins of the year." During the 2025 PWHL playoffs, Jackson began the series against the Minnesota Frost as the backup to Campbell. After Campbell allowed 12 goals on 49 shots in games two and three, Toronto head coach Troy Ryan made the decision to start Jackson in game four, naming them the starter just one hour before the game. Jackson made their playoff debut, stopping 22 of 26 shots in a 4–3 overtime loss, with Taylor Heise scoring the series-clinching goal at 16:00 of overtime. The loss eliminated Toronto from the playoffs, while Minnesota advanced to win the Walter Cup for the second consecutive year.

==== Seattle Torrent (2025–present) ====
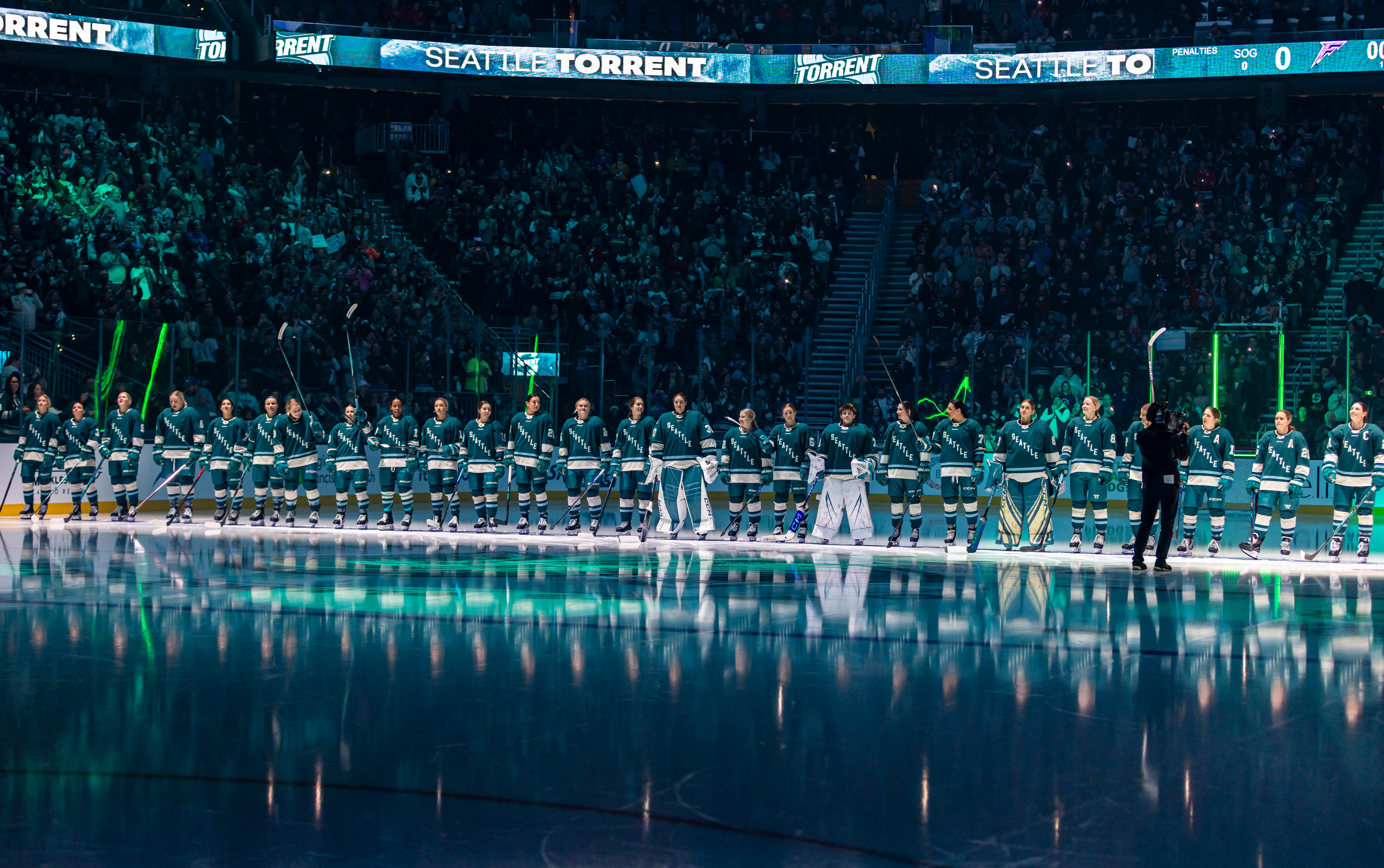
Jackson with their Torrent teammates at the record-breaking home opener at Climate Pledge Arena, November 2025

On July 9, 2025, Jackson signed a one-year contract with the Seattle Torrent, one of two expansion franchises joining the PWHL for the 2025–26 PWHL season. Jackson joined a goaltending group that includes Corinne Schroeder and Hannah Murphy. On November 28, 2025, the Torrent played their inaugural home opener at Climate Pledge Arena in front of a record-breaking crowd of 16,014 fans, setting multiple attendance benchmarks. The attendance established a new U.S. arena record for a women's hockey game, surpassing the previous record of 15,359 set at an NCAA game between the University of Wisconsin and St. Cloud State on January 14, 2017. It also topped the U.S. record for a professional women's hockey game of 14,288 set during the PWHL Takeover Tour in Detroit on March 16, 2025, and became the highest-attended primary home venue game in PWHL history.

==== International ====
Jackson represented Canada at the 2015 IIHF World Women's U18 Championship in Buffalo, New York, held in January 2015. Jackson was one of three goaltenders named to the 23-player roster, alongside Marlène Boissonnault and Stephanie Neatby. Canada won the silver medal at the tournament after losing 3–2 in overtime to the United States in the gold medal game.

== Style of play ==
Having played baseball alongside hockey during their childhood, Jackson has been noted for the strength of their glove hand, as well as their speed and stamina.

== Awards and honours ==
=== NCAA ===
- Hockey East Pro-Ambitions Rookie of the Week (awarded October 17, 2016)
- 2017 Hockey East All-Academic Team
- 2017 Maine Scholar Athlete Bronze Medal recipient
- 2017-18 Hockey East All-Star Honorable Mention
- Hockey East Defensive Player of the Week (Awarded January 8, 2018)
- 2018 Maine Scholar Athlete Silver Medal recipient

=== NWHL/PHF ===
- 2021 NWHL Foundation Award (Buffalo Beauts representative)
- 2021 NWHL Fans' 3 Stars of the Season (shared with Mikyla Grant-Mentis and Mallory Souliotis)
- Finalist, 2021 NWHL Goaltender of the Year
- Finalist, 2021 NWHL Newcomer of the Year *Carly Jackson Finalist, NWHL Newcomer of the Year
- 2023 PHF Fans' 3 Stars of the Season (shared with Dominique Kremer and Loren Gabel)
- 2023 Isobel Cup champion

== Personal life ==
Jackson is non-binary and uses she/they pronouns.

== Film and media ==
In 2025, Jackson made their acting debut, starring as Scotty in the short film Pink Light, directed by former pro hockey player Harrison Browne. The film premiered at the 2025 Toronto International Film Festival.

== Career statistics ==
=== Regular season and playoffs ===
Note: GP = Games played; Min, TOI = Minutes played; W = Wins; L = Losses; T,T/OT = Ties; OTL = Overtime losses; GA = Goals-against; GAA = Goals-against average; SO = Shutouts; SV% = Save percentage;

			Regular season									Playoffs
Season	Team	League	GP	W	L	T/OT	MIN	GA	SO	GAA	SV%	GP	W	L	MIN	GA	SO	GAA	SV%
2014–15	Cumberland County Blues	NSJHL	15	—	—	—	—	—	—	7.70	.850	—	—	—	—	—	—	—	—
2016–17	University of Maine	HE	27	7	19	1	1477	70	1	2.84	.911	—	—	—	—	—	—	—	—
2017–18	University of Maine	HE	35	17	12	5	2091	68	3	1.95	.924	—	—	—	—	—	—	—	—
2018–19	University of Maine	HE	28	9	13	5	1566	54	3	2.07	.920	—	—	—	—	—	—	—	—
2019–20	University of Maine	HE	32	12	11	7	1922	61	3	1.90	.934	—	—	—	—	—	—	—	—
2020–21	Buffalo Beauts	NWHL	6	1	4	0	351	21	0	3.59	.909	—	—	—	—	—	—	—	—
2021–22	Buffalo Beauts	PHF	17	6	11	0	905	49	1	3.25	.903	1	0	1	60	6	0	6.00	.833
2022–23	Toronto Six	PHF	6	5	0	0	316	10	0	1.90	.926	—	—	—	—	—	—	—	—
2024–25	Toronto Sceptres	PWHL	1	1	0	0	65	1	0	0.93	.962	1	0	1	76	4	0	3.16	.846
NWHL/PHF totals			29	12	15	0	1572	80	1	2.91	.913	1	0	1	60	6	0	6.00	.833
PWHL totals			1	1	0	0	65	1	0	0.93	.962	1	0	1	76	4	0	3.16	.846
