= Haley Mack =

American ice hockey player

- Born: May 29, 1998 (age 27) East Grand Forks, Minnesota, United States
- Height: 5 ft 2 in (157 cm)
- Position: Forward
- Shoots: Left
- PHF team Former teams: Minnesota Whitecaps; Bemidji State Beavers
- Playing career: 2016–present

Haley Mack (born May 29, 1998) is an American ice hockey forward, currently playing with the Minnesota Whitecaps of the Premier Hockey Federation (PHF). She was drafted in the fourth round, 23rd overall by the Whitecaps in the 2020 NWHL Draft.

== Playing career ==
She attended East Grand Forks Senior High School and played on the school's girls' ice hockey team in the Minnesota State High School League (MSHSL), setting a school record for points in a season with 72 points (38 goals + 34 assists) in the 2013–14 season.

From 2016 to 2020, she attended Bemidji State University and played with the Bemidji State Beavers women's ice hockey programme, scoring 77 points across 132 NCAA Division I games. She scored a career-high 28 points in 37 games in her senior year, leading the team in scoring and being named to the WCHA All-Academic Team for the third time. She finished her university career as the fifth highest goal scorer in the programme's history.

She was drafted 23rd overall by the Minnesota Whitecaps in the 2020 NWHL Draft, the first Bemidji State player to ever be drafted into the NWHL. In September 2020, she signed her first professional contract with the team for the 2020–21 NWHL season.

== Awards and honors ==
- Finalist, 2021 NWHL Newcomer of the Year

== Personal life ==
Her father, Jason Mack, played ice hockey for Bemidji State University, serving as team captain of the men's program in the early 1990s.
