= Sarah-Ève Coutu-Godbout =

Canadian ice hockey player

- Born: June 16, 1997 (age 29) Rouyn-Noranda, Quebec, Canada
- Height: 170 cm (5 ft 7 in)
- Weight: 66 kg (146 lb; 10 st 6 lb)
- Position: Forward
- Shoots: Left
- SDHL team Former teams: Frölunda HC: AIK Hockey; Toronto Six; Quinnipiac Bobcats
- National team: Canada
- Playing career: 2016–present
Medal record
U18 World Championship
Silver medal – second place	2015 United States

Sarah-Ève Coutu-Godbout (born June 16, 1997) is a Canadian ice hockey player, currently playing in the Swedish Women's Hockey League (SDHL) with Frölunda HC. She won a silver medal with the Canadian under-18 national team at the 2016 IIHF U18 Women's World Championship.

== Playing career ==
Coutu-Godbout attended Cégep Limoilou in Québec City for secondary school, where she studied administration and economics. While studying, she played for the cégep's ice hockey team, Les Titans, putting up 51 points in 43 games. In 2015, she was the recipient of a $1500 bursary from the NHL's Montreal Canadiens, along with teammate Élizabeth Giguère, for excellence in women's youth hockey in Québec.

In 2016, she moved to Connecticut in the United States to study entrepreneurship and play for Quinnipiac University, a member institution of the ECAC Hockey conference. Across the next four years with the Quinnipiac Bobcats, she would score 62 points in 122 NCAA games. After a bureaucratic delay concerning her language qualifications for eligibility - she was the first native francophone to play for Quinnipiac - she scored 6 points in 22 games in her rookie season and was named ECAC Rookie of the Month in February 2017. She finished fourth and fifth on the team in goals scored in her second and third years, respectively, before breaking out to score 16 goals in her senior season to lead the team in goals.

During her time in university, she had openly expressed her desire to play in the PHF. After graduating, she had originally explored opportunities from teams in Sweden, before deciding against it due to uncertainty from the COVID-19 pandemic. In May 2020, she signed her first professional contract with the expansion Toronto Six of the PHF, the seventh player to sign with the team, and turned down an offer from the Connecticut Whale.

=== International play ===
Coutu-Godbout played for Team Canada at the 2015 IIHF World Women's U18 Championship, scoring one goal in five games as the country won silver.

== Career statistics ==
=== Regular season and playoffs ===
			Regular season					Postseason
Season	Team	League	GP	G	A	Pts	PIM	GP	G	A	Pts	PIM
2014–15	Titans du Cégep Limoilou	QCHL	27	14	16	30		–	–	–	–	–
2015–16	Titans du Cégep Limoilou	QCHL	16	9	12	21		–	–	–	–	–
2016–17	Quinnipiac Bobcats	NCAA	22	2	4	6	4	–	–	–	–	–
2017–18	Quinnipiac Bobcats	NCAA	32	9	7	16	14	–	–	–	–	–
2018–19	Quinnipiac Bobcats	NCAA	32	7	7	14	16	–	–	–	–	–
2019–20	Quinnipiac Bobcats	NCAA	36	16	10	26	8	–	–	–	–	–
2020–21	Toronto Six	NWHL	6	2	1	3	2	–	–	–	–	–
2021–22	AIK Hockey	SDHL	26	9	5	14	16	2	0	0	0	0
2022–23	Frölunda HC	NDHL	26	36	37	73	4	8	7	5	12	6
NCAA totals			122	34	28	62	42	–	–	–	–	–

=== International ===
Year	Team	Event	Result	GP	G	A	Pts	PIM
2016	Canada	WW18	2nd place, silver medalist(s)	5	1	0	1	0
Junior totals				5	1	0	1	0
