= Mikyla Grant-Mentis =

Canadian ice hockey player (born 1998)

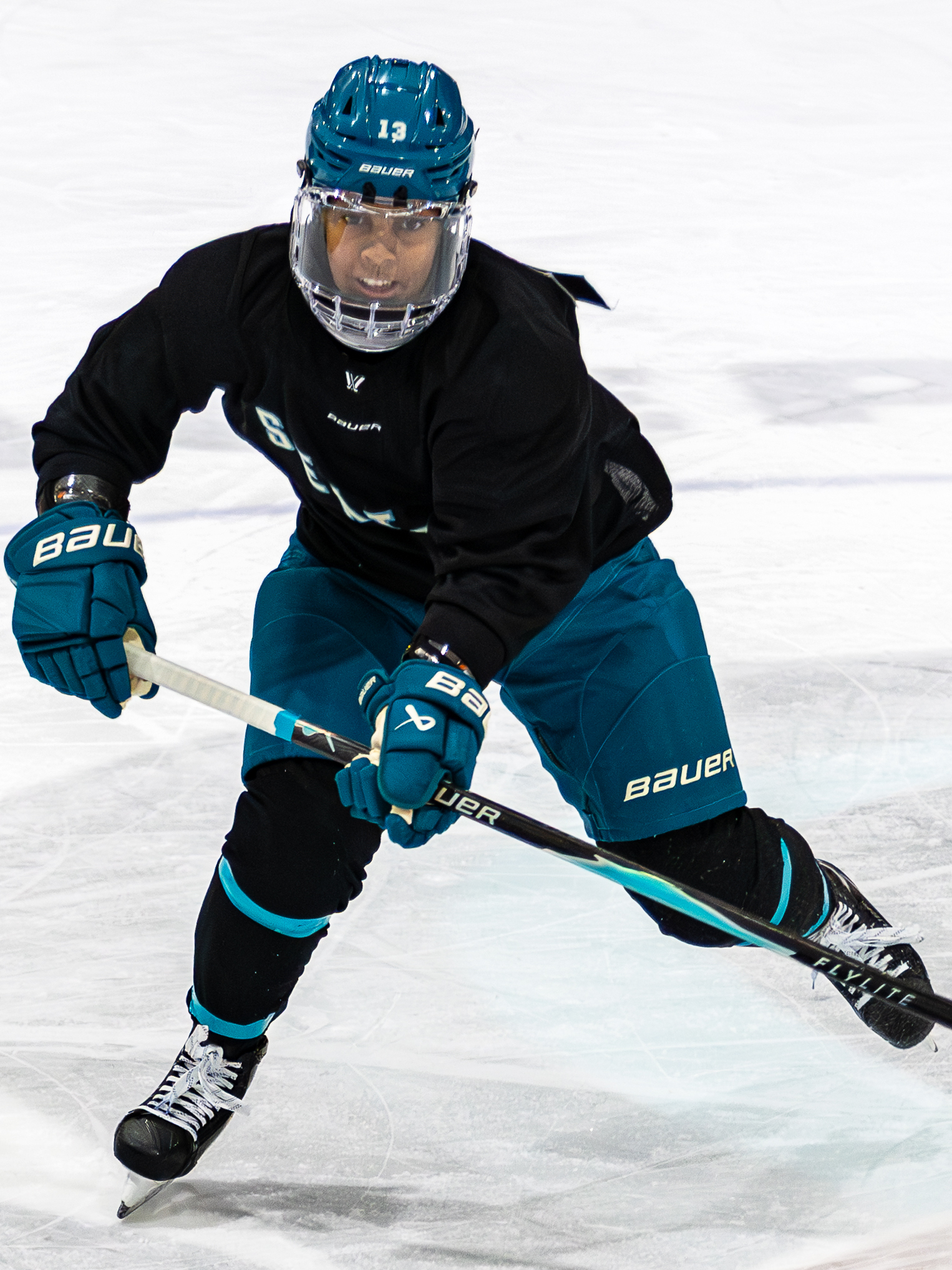
- Grant-Mentis with the Seattle Torrent in 2025
- Born: July 15, 1998 (age 28) Brampton, Ontario, Canada
- Height: 5 ft 6 in (168 cm)
- Position: Forward
- Shoots: Left
- PWHL team Former teams: Seattle Torrent; Montreal Victoire; PWHL Ottawa; Buffalo Beauts; Toronto Six; Merrimack Warriors
- Playing career: 2016–present

Mikyla Grant-Mentis (born July 15, 1998) is a Canadian professional ice hockey forward for the Seattle Torrent of the Professional Women's Hockey League (PWHL). She is the all-time leading scorer of the Merrimack Warriors women's ice hockey team and made history in 2021 as the first Black player to win the Most Valuable Player award of the Premier Hockey Federation (PHF), becoming the most decorated player in a single PHF season with a record four accolades.

Grant-Mentis played four years of college ice hockey at Merrimack College from 2016 to 2020, where she established herself as one of the program's most prolific scorers. She finished her collegiate career with 117 points (56 goals and 61 assists) in 137 games, setting program records for all-time points and assists while ranking second in goals.

After brief stints with the Buffalo Beauts in 2020, she joined the expansion Toronto Six for their inaugural 2020–21 season, where she tied for the league lead in points during the pandemic-shortened season and helped guide the Six to the regular season title. Her outstanding performance earned her the league's MVP, Newcomer of the Year, Foundation Award for community service, and Fans' Three Stars of the Season—the first player in league history to win four awards in a single season. She continued her success with the Six in 2021–22, leading the team in scoring and becoming the first player in PHF history to record a six-point game.

Grant-Mentis was named to the Forbes 30 Under 30 for North America 2022 in the sports category at age 23, recognizing her impact both on and off the ice. Following the PHF's dissolution in 2023, Grant-Mentis joined the newly formed PWHL, playing for the Ottawa Charge, Montreal Victoire, and currently the Seattle Torrent.

== Early life ==
Grant-Mentis was born on July 15, 1998, in Brampton, Ontario, to Sandra Grant-Mentis and James Mentis. She has two siblings, an older brother Marquis and a younger brother Tre, with Marquis being her twin. Her father James played ball hockey for Team Canada and Team West Indies, and remains active with the Brampton Express of the Greater Toronto Ball Hockey League.

Grant-Mentis started playing organized ice hockey at age four with her older brother Marquis. Initially, her parents did not want her to play physical sports and had planned for her to be a dancer, while her twin brother and older brother were enrolled in hockey. She eventually joined her brothers on boys' teams, as her parents did not want to split the twins up. Grant-Mentis played on boys' teams for several years before transitioning to girls' hockey with the Toronto Aeros of the Provincial Women's Hockey League (PWHL). Grant-Mentis played junior hockey in the Provincial Women's Hockey League for both the Toronto Aeros and the Mississauga Jr. Chiefs. In the 2015–16 season with the Mississauga Jr. Chiefs, she posted 21 goals and 28 assists for 49 points in 37 games, ranking second on her team in all three statistical categories. She accumulated totals of 26 goals and 48 assists for 74 points in 75 games with the Chiefs, and added 12 points in 11 playoff games with 6 goals and 6 assists in the 2015–16 PWHL playoffs.

== Playing career ==
=== College ===
Grant-Mentis played four years of NCAA Division I ice hockey with the Merrimack Warriors of Merrimack College, a member institution of the Hockey East conference, located in North Andover, Massachusetts. In her freshman season, Grant-Mentis led the team with 27 points and 18 assists. She was named Hockey East Rookie of the Month in January and earned Hockey East Rookie of the Week honors twice. She finished fifth among all Hockey East freshmen in points per game (.70) and ranked third in conference play with a faceoff winning percentage of .626. Grant-Mentis appeared in all 34 games as a sophomore and was second on the team in points (23), goals (15), and tied for second in assists (8). She finished the year with two game-winning goals, against Princeton (November 25) and New Hampshire (January 10). She posted a seven-game point streak from November 24 to January 10, recording six goals and eight assists during that span. She won 83 faceoffs, fifth-best on the team. In her junior season, Grant-Mentis became the sixth player in Division I women's hockey history to score two short-handed goals in a single game. She tied for the Hockey East conference lead in short-handed points with 4. Grant-Mentis was the runner-up for Hockey East Defensive Player of the Year in 2018–19.

On November 8 of her senior season, Grant-Mentis had a four-point (two goals, two assists) game against Maine, becoming just the second player to surpass 100 points in Merrimack program history. Three weeks later, she scored a hat-trick against Brown on November 27 and was recognized as the Hockey East Co-Player of the Month for November 2020. She played in 33 games during her senior season and led the Warriors in goals (20) and points (33), ranking second on the Hockey East goals leaderboard and top-10 in scoring nationally. Grant-Mentis finished her collegiate career with 117 points (56 goals and 61 assists) in 137 games with the Warriors, becoming the program's all-time leading point scorer, all-time assists leader, and second all-time in goals. She was named to the Hockey East Second Team All-Star as a senior and was a New England Hockey Writers Association Division I All-Star.

=== Professional ===
==== Buffalo Beauts (2019–20) ====
At the end of February 2020, Grant-Mentis signed with the Buffalo Beauts to finish the 2019–20 NWHL season along with Merrimack teammate Léa-Kristine Demers. She scored three points (2 goals, 1 assist) in two regular season games and added another two points (1 goal, 1 assist) in the PHF playoffs semi-final qualification as the Beauts, who finished fourth in the standings with an 8–15–1 record, lost to the Connecticut Whale. She was named Player of the Week in her first week in the PHF.

==== Toronto Six (2020–22) ====
In May 2020, Grant-Mentis signed with the expansion Toronto Six, joining the team ahead of their inaugural season in the PHF. Grant-Mentis's first PHF goal as a member of the Six came in a January 24, 2021, contest versus the 2019 Clarkson Cup champion Minnesota Whitecaps. In the 6–5 shootout loss, Grant-Mentis became the only Six player to score in the shootout round. Two days later on January 26, she recorded the game-winning goal in the Six's first win in franchise history against the Boston Pride, coming back from a 1–0 deficit with a pair of third period goals by Brooke Boquist and Grant-Mentis. In the pandemic-shortened season played in a bubble in Lake Placid, New York, Grant-Mentis tied for the NWHL regular-season lead in points with five goals and four assists in six games. She led the league with five goals and helped guide Toronto to the regular season title, clinching the top seed in the playoffs. She added a goal and an assist in the Isobel Cup semifinal, a 6–2 loss to the eventual champion Boston Pride. Grant-Mentis became the most decorated player in a single PHF season, earning a record four accolades. She became the first Black player in league history to win the Most Valuable Player and Newcomer of the Year awards. She was also one of six players to receive the league's Foundation Award for applying core values of hockey to her community and growing and improving hockey culture, recognized for her community outreach work with disadvantaged families in the Greater Toronto Area. Additionally, she was selected as one of the Fans' Three Stars of the Season. In June 2021, the Six re-signed Grant-Mentis for the 2021–22 season.

Grant-Mentis led the Six in scoring during the 2021–22 season with 13 goals and 17 assists for 30 points in 19 regular season games, finishing second in the PHF in points, goals, assists, and points per game (1.6). The Six finished second in the standings with a 17–5–2 record. In January 2022, Grant-Mentis was named PHF Player of the Month after recording eight points in two games against Buffalo, including three goals and five assists. On January 16, 2022, she became the first player in PHF history to record a six-point performance in a single game when she tallied two goals and four assists in an 8–3 win over Buffalo. One day earlier, she scored her league-leading fourth game-winning goal of the season along with an assist in a 6–1 victory over the Beauts. She also competed in the 2022 PHF All-Star Showcase in January.

==== Buffalo Beauts (2022–23) ====
On May 9, 2022, Grant-Mentis signed a one-year, $80,000 deal to return to the Buffalo Beauts, making her the highest-paid player in PHF history. The contract represented 9.38% of the Beauts' $750,000 salary cap and allowed Grant-Mentis to quit her FedEx job to focus exclusively on playing professional hockey. During the 2022–23 season, Grant-Mentis led the Beauts in scoring with 21 points (9 goals, 12 assists) in 24 games. However, the Beauts finished last in the league with a 5–16–3 record and failed to qualify for the playoffs. The PHF folded following the conclusion of the season.

==== PWHL Ottawa (2023–24) ====
After the PHF folded and the Professional Women's Hockey League (PWHL) was founded, Grant-Mentis went undrafted in the inaugural 2023 PWHL Draft but signed a free agent contract with PWHL Ottawa. After an underwhelming start to the season that included a stretch of healthy scratches, Grant-Mentis recorded three assists and had one goal called back during her six games with Ottawa before being released from her contract on February 17, 2024.

==== PWHL Montreal (2024–25) ====
On March 10, 2024, Grant-Mentis signed a Reserve Player Contract with PWHL Montreal. During the 2024–25 PWHL season, she recorded three goals and five assists for eight points in 30 games for the Victoire.

==== Seattle Torrent (2025–present) ====
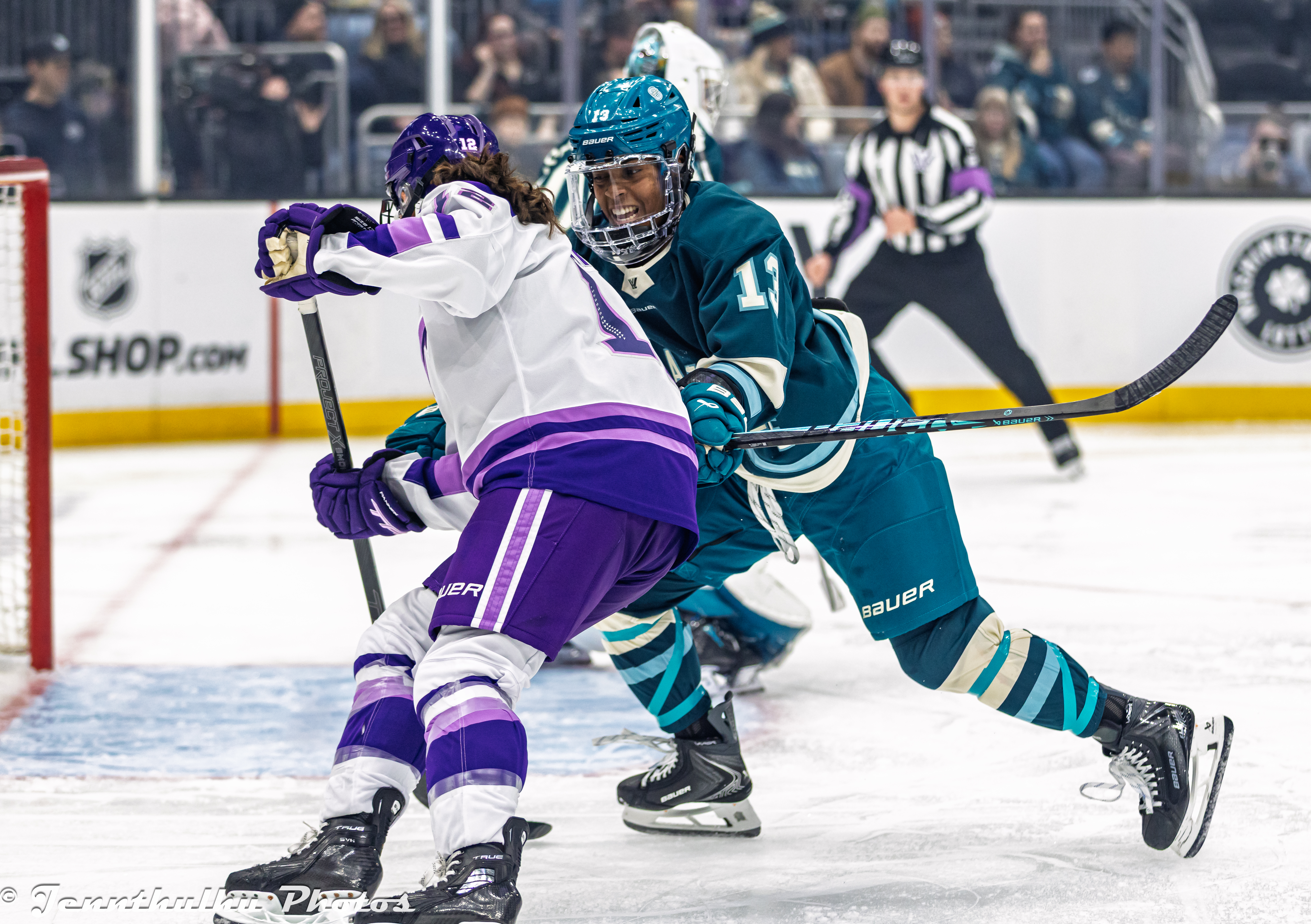
Grant-Mentis (right) during a game against the Minnesota Frost, November 2025

On June 20, 2025, Grant-Mentis signed a two-year contract with the Seattle Torrent. On November 28, 2025, the Torrent played their inaugural home opener at Climate Pledge Arena in front of a record-breaking crowd of 16,014 fans, setting multiple attendance benchmarks. The attendance established a new U.S. arena record for a women's hockey game, surpassing the previous record of 15,359 set at an NCAA game between the University of Wisconsin and St. Cloud State on January 14, 2017. It also topped the U.S. record for a professional women's hockey game of 14,288 set during the PWHL Takeover Tour in Detroit on March 16, 2025, and became the highest-attended primary home venue game in PWHL history. The Torrent lost the game 3–0 to the two-time defending Walter Cup champion Minnesota Frost. On December 21, 2025, Grant-Mentis recorded her first assist for the Torrent in a 3–1 loss to the Boston Fleet at Climate Pledge Arena. She assisted on Jessie Eldridge's goal with 26 seconds remaining in the third period, which spoiled goaltender Abbey Levy's shutout bid. On December 28, 2025, Grant-Mentis scored her first goal for the Torrent in a 4–3 loss to the New York Sirens at the American Airlines Center in Dallas as part of the PWHL Takeover Tour. She sped through the neutral zone and cleaned up a rebound off a shot from Natalie Snodgrass, with Hilary Knight earning the secondary assist. Grant-Mentis also recorded an assist on Lexie Adzija's goal. In a home game on March 11, 2026 against the first place Boston Fleet, Grant-Mentis scored a shorthanded jailbreak goal at 14:47 of the third period to tie the game 2–2. Danielle Serdachny added the game-winner within a minute and a half later to solidify a 3–2 comeback victory. The game was the Torrent's first-ever win over Boston and ended the Fleet's six-game winning streak.

== Personal life ==
Grant-Mentis holds a bachelor's degree in criminology from Merrimack College. In December 2021, Grant-Mentis was named to the Forbes 30 Under 30 for North America 2022 in the sports category at age 23, making her the second-youngest honoree in that category.

She appeared in Ice Queens (2023), a documentary about the history of Black women in ice hockey.

== Career statistics ==
			Regular season					Playoffs
Season	Team	League	GP	G	A	Pts	PIM	GP	G	A	Pts	PIM
2013–14	Oakville Jr. Hornets	Prov. WHL	2	0	0	0	0	—	—	—	—	—
2014–15	Toronto Jr. Aeros	Prov. WHL	38	5	20	25	8	14	2	2	4	10
2015–16	Mississauga Jr. Chiefs	Prov. WHL	37	21	28	49	14	11	6	6	12	8
2016–17	Merrimack Warriors	NCAA	35	9	18	27	20	—	—	—	—	—
2017–18	Merrimack Warriors	NCAA	34	15	8	23	43	—	—	—	—	—
2018–19	Merrimack Warriors	NCAA	35	12	22	37	29	—	—	—	—	—
2019–20	Merrimack Warriors	NCAA	33	20	13	33	26	—	—	—	—	—
2019–20	Buffalo Beauts	PHF	2	2	1	3	2	1	1	1	2	0
2020–21	Toronto Six	PHF	6	5	4	9	4	1	1	1	1	0
2021–22	Toronto Six	PHF	19	13	17	30	6	1	0	0	0	2
2022–23	Buffalo Beauts	PHF	24	9	12	21	20	—	—	—	—	—
2023–24	PWHL Ottawa	PWHL	6	0	3	3	0	—	—	—	—	—
2023–24	PWHL Montreal	PWHL	7	2	0	2	4	—	—	—	—	—
2024–25	Montreal Victoire	PWHL	30	3	5	8	18	4	0	0	0	0
2025–26	Seattle Torrent	PWHL	25	3	3	6	8	—	—	—	—	—
PHF totals			51	29	34	63	32	3	2	2	4	2
PWHL totals			68	8	11	19	30	7	0	1	1	0

== Awards and honours ==
- 2021 NWHL Most Valuable Player
- 2021 NWHL Newcomer of the Year
- 2021 NWHL Foundation Award (Toronto Six representative)
- 2021 NWHL Fans' Three Stars
- 2020–21 NWHL most goals scored
