= Elaine Chuli =

Canadian ice hockey player (born 1994)

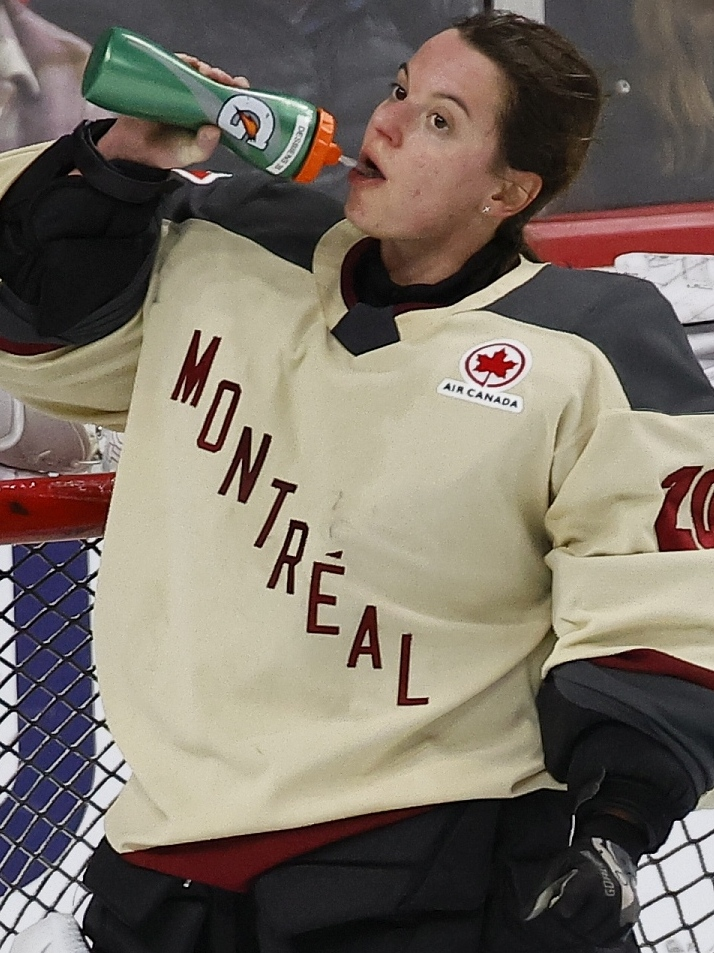
- Chuli with PWHL Montreal in 2024
- Born: May 16, 1994 (age 32) Waterford, Ontario, Canada
- Height: 5 ft 7 in (170 cm)
- Weight: 132 lb (60 kg; 9 st 6 lb)
- Position: Goaltender
- Catches: Left
- PWHL team Former teams: New York Sirens: Toronto Sceptres; Montreal Victoire; Toronto Six; PWHPA GTA West; Toronto Furies; Vanke Rays
- Playing career: 2012–present

Elaine Monica Chuli (born May 16, 1994) is a Canadian ice hockey player who is a goaltender currently playing for the New York Sirens of the Professional Women's Hockey League (PWHL). She played college ice hockey for the UConn Huskies where she is the all-time saves leader for both the Hockey East (WHEA) conference and the Huskies program. She won the Isobel Cup with the Toronto Six in 2023.

== Playing career ==
=== College ===
Elaine Chuli was a member of the UConn Huskies women's ice hockey team during 2012 to 2016. In her senior year, she was named to the 2016 CCM/AHCA All-American Second Team.

=== CWHL ===
She was drafted by the Vanke Rays in the second round of the 2017 CWHL Draft and signed with the Rays for the 2017–18 season. In her first season, she played 1516 minutes in net, more than any other goalie in the league, though the team missed the playoffs.

After the Rays were merged with the Kunlun Red Star WIH to become the Shenzhen KRS Vanke Rays, Chuli signed with the Toronto Furies, where she would play for the 2018–19 season before the CWHL folded.

=== PWHPA ===
In May 2019, Chuli joined over 200 women's ice hockey players in forming the PWHPA. She played for Team Knox at the Unifor Showcase in Toronto in September 2019, the first showcase of the PWHPA's Dream Gap Tour, and then for Team Spooner at the Secret Women's Hockey Showcase in January 2020.

=== NWHL/PHF ===
In April 2020, she signed with the first Canadian expansion team of the National Women's Hockey League (NWHL), the Toronto Six. Starting in the Six's first game, a January 23, 2021 affair versus the Metropolitan Riveters, Chuli was recognized as the Second Star of the Game in a 3–0 loss. Against the eventual Isobel Cup champion Boston Pride, the Six enjoyed their first win. Opposing the Pride on January 26, 2021, Chuli recorded 24 saves in the win., a 2–1 final with third period goals by Brooke Boquist and Mikyla Grant-Mentis, whose goal stood as the game-winner.

=== PWHL ===
Chuli was selected in the thirteenth round, 78th overall by PWHL Montreal in the 2023 PWHL Draft and signed a one-year contract with the team. She made her PWHL debut on January 10, 2024 with a 5–2 win over PWHL New York.

On June 17, 2025, she signed a one-year contract with the Toronto Sceptres.

== International play ==
Medal record

Representing Canada

Women's ice hockey

World U18 Championships
Gold medal – first place	2012 Czechia	

Chuli competed as member of Team Canada at the 2012 IIHF World Women's U18 Championship. She joined a roster filled with other future hockey stars, including Cayley Mercer, Laura Stacey, Erin Ambrose, goaltender Emerance Maschmeyer, and future Toronto Six teammate Taylor Woods. Chuli was in the crease for two of Team Canada's five games, playing the full 60 minutes in each. Against Germany in the group stage she posted a 6–0 shutout and, five days later, she posted a 7–0 shutout against Sweden in the semifinals, cementing herself as the top goaltender of the tournament, with a 1.000 save percentage and 0 goals against average. Her performance helped Team Canada sweep the tournament and win the gold medal that year.

== Personal life ==
Chuli holds a degree in accounting from the University of Connecticut.

She is a member of the LGBTQ community and in a relationship with Detroit Clutch forward Shiann Darkangelo.

Elaine has one sister, Ericka Chuli.

== Career statistics ==
=== Regular season and playoffs ===
			Regular season									Playoffs
Season	Team	League	GP	W	L	T	Min	GA	SO	GAA	S%	GP	W	L	Min	GA	SO	GAA	S%
2012–13	UConn Huskies	NCAA	27	1	21	3	1,491	98	0	3.94	.892	—	—	—	—	—	—	—	—
2013–14	UConn Huskies	NCAA	24	7	16	1	1,402	60	2	2.57	.929	—	—	—	—	—	—	—	—
2014–15	UConn Huskies	NCAA	25	8	12	5	1,500	73	1	2.92	.924	—	—	—	—	—	—	—	—
2015–16	UConn Huskies	NCAA	26	12	12	2	1,587	61	3	2.28	.941	—	—	—	—	—	—	—	—
2017–18	Vanke Rays	CWHL	27	14	11	1	1,516	74	4	2.94	.913	—	—	—	—	—	—	—	—
2018–19	Toronto Furies	CWHL	14	6	7	0	773	39	2	3.03	.899	1	0	1	58:	3	0	6.14	.912
2020–21	Toronto Six	NWHL	6	4	1	0	298	8	1	1.61	.936	1	0	1	44	5	0	6.81	.762
2021–22	Toronto Six	PHF	17	16	1	0	988	30	2	1.82	.931	1	0	1	60	5	0	5.00	.821
2022–23	Toronto Six	PHF	19	12	5	0	1,127	49	2	2.61	.917	4	3	1	245	9	1	2.20	.920
2023–24	PWHL Montreal	PWHL	8	6	1	0	484	13	0	1.61	.949	—	—	—	—	—	—	—	—
2024–25	Montreal Victoire	PWHL	11	4	6	0	595	24	0	2.42	.910	—	—	—	—	—	—	—	—
2025–26	Toronto Sceptres	PWHL	8	3	5	0	456	22	0	2.89	.893	—	—	—	—	—	—	—	—
PWHL totals			27	13	12	0	1,535	59	0	2.31	.919	—	—	—	—	—	—	—	—
CWHL totals			41	20	18	1	2,289	113	6	2.97	.909	1	0	1	58	3	0	6.14	.912
PHF totals			42	33	7	0	2,414	87	5	2.16	.924	6	3	3	349	19	2	3.26	.882

=== International ===
Year	Team	Event	Result	GP	W	L	T	MIN	GA	SO	GAA	SV%
2012	Canada	U18	1st place, gold medalist(s)	2	2	0	0	120:00	0	2	0.00	1.000
Junior totals				2	2	0	0	120:00	0	2	0.00	1.000

== Awards and honours ==
Award	Year	ref
NCAA
CCM/AHCA All-American; Women's University Division - Second Team	2016	
Hockey East All-Star; First Team	2016	
Hockey East All-Star Honorable Mention	2014, 2015	
WHEA All-Tournament Team	2015	
Hockey East All-Academic Team	2013, 2014, 2015, 2016	
Hockey East Goaltending Champion; Runner-up	2016	
CoSIDA Academic All-District™ At-Large Team – District 1	2015–16	
University of Connecticut Women's Ice Hockey
Most Valuable Player	2014, 2015, 2016	
Pat Babcock Award Player who best exemplifies the team	2016	
Letterwinner	2012–2015	

Monthly collegiate honours and awards

- Hockey East (WHEA) Goaltender of the Month (2)
  - January 2014 (co-awarded with BC’s Corinne Boyles)
  - February 2015

=== Professional ===
- 2020-21 NWHL regular season leader, Wins
- Finalist, 2021 NWHL Goaltender of the Year
- Winner, PHF Goaltender of the Year

Awards and achievements
Preceded by Amanda Leveille	PHF Goaltender of the Year; 2022	Succeeded by Corinne Schroeder
