= 2021–22 PHF season =

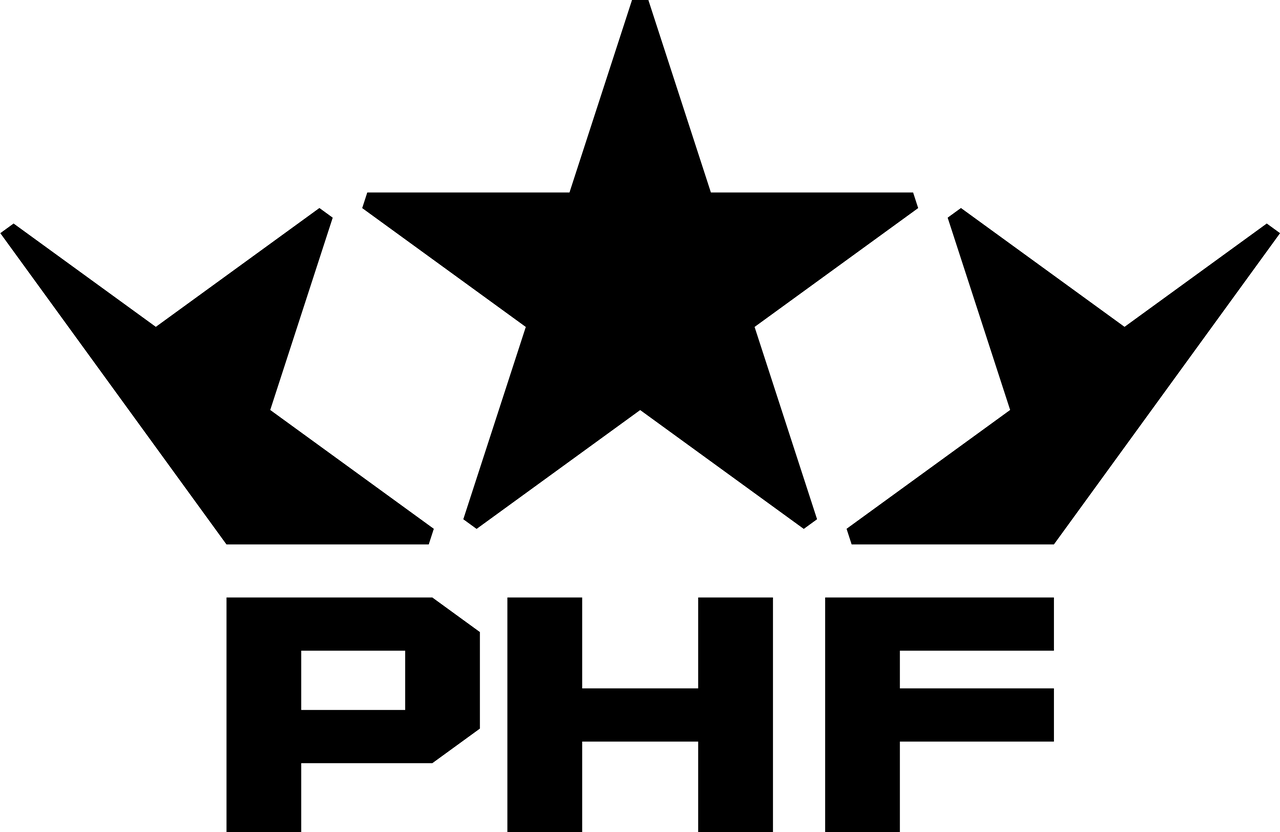
- League: Premier Hockey Federation
- Sport: Ice hockey
- Duration: November 6, 2021 – March 27, 2022
- Matches: 20
- Teams: 6
- TV partner(s): ESPN+ ESPN2 and TSN2 (Isobel Cup finals)

Regular season
- Season Champions: Connecticut Whale
- Top scorer: Kennedy Marchment (Connecticut)

Isobel Cup
- Champions: Boston Pride
- Runners-up: Connecticut Whale
- Finals MVP: Taylor Wenczkowski

Premier Hockey Federation seasons
- 2020–21 2022–23

The 2021–22 PHF season was the seventh season of the Premier Hockey Federation (PHF), which was known as the National Women's Hockey League during the previous six seasons, in North America. After mostly playing in a bubble environment the previous season due to the on-going COVID-19 pandemic, the PHF commenced the 2021–22 season with a normal travel-based schedule.

== League business ==
Following the 2021 Isobel Cup Finals, Lisa Haley was appointed as the league's vice president of hockey operations.

On April 28, 2021, the league announced that it was planning to double the salary cap of every franchise to $300,000, based on projections of financial stability for the seventh season.

On September 7, 2021, it was announced that the league would be renamed from the National Women's Hockey League (NWHL) to the Premier Hockey Federation (PHF).

On February 23, 2022, the league announced that all teams were allowed to sign one additional player for the remainder of the season and spend an additional $10,000 above the current $300,000 salary cap. Additionally, all clubs would also be allowed to dress 18 skaters per game, up from 17 for the rest of the 2021–22 season.

=== Expansion ===
Plans for an expansion team in Montreal, Quebec, for the seventh season were delayed. Boston Pride president Miles Arnone, a member of the BTM Group, the group behind establishing the expansion club, confirmed the league announcement. With concerns over the on-going COVID-19 pandemic, the earliest season for an expansion team in Montreal would be 2022–23.

=== Team ownership ===
On May 10, the NWHL announced the sale and transfer of ownership of the Connecticut Whale to Shared Hockey Enterprises (SHE), LLC, led by Tobin Kelly. The Whale became the first of the four founding teams to be sold to outside ownership after the league's October 2020 announcement of its transition to joint venture models. The Metropolitan Riveters then were sold to BTM Partners on May 26, giving them control of three of the league's six franchises. A transfer of ownership from W Hockey Partners, the new ownership installed John Boynton to serve as the Riveters' chairman. The NWHL finished selling its league operated teams to independent ownership with the sale of the Buffalo Beauts and Minnesota Whitecaps to a joint partnership of NLTT Ventures, LLC, and Top Tier Sports on June 28, 2021.

=== Front office changes ===
General managers
Off–season
Team	2020–21 GM	2021–22 GM	Notes
Toronto Six	Mandy Cronin	Krystiana (Krysti) Clarke	Clarke's background has included a role as manager of operations with York United FC of Canadian Premier League soccer

(*) Indicates interim.

=== Coaching changes ===
Coaches
Off–season
Team	2020–21 coach	2021–22 coach	Notes
Toronto Six	Digit Murphy	Mark Joslin	Joslin spent the last four seasons with the Ontario Junior Hockey League's Toronto Patriots

== Regular season ==
=== Standings ===
The regular season schedule was published on August 5, 2021.

Standings as of March 22, 2022.

Team	GP	W	L	OTL	Pts (Note: 3 points are awarded for a regulation win, 2 points are awarded for an overtime/shootout win, 1 point is awarded for an overtime/shootout loss, 0 points are awarded for a regulation loss) (Note: Tiebreaker order is: Points, Head-to-head record, Regulation wins, Wins, Goal Differential)	RW	OTW	SOW	GF	GA	Diff	PIM
Connecticut Whale	20	15	3	2	47	15	0	0	74	44	+30	142
Toronto Six	20	16	3	1	46	13	3	0	66	45	+21	154
Boston Pride	20	10	5	5	32	7	2	1	48	47	+1	152
Metropolitan Riveters	20	7	12	1	21	6	1	0	54	65	-11	195
Minnesota Whitecaps	20	6	13	1	19	6	0	0	62	64	-12	202
Buffalo Beauts	20	6	14	0	15	3	3	0	44	73	-29	176

=== Schedule ===
All times listed are Eastern Time.

Regular season schedule
Date	Visitor	Score	Home	OT	Notes
November 6	Connecticut	1–4	Metropolitan		
November 6	Toronto	4–3	Buffalo		
November 6	Minnesota	4–6	Boston		
November 7	Minnesota	0–1	Boston		
November 7	Connecticut	6–5	Metropolitan		
November 13	Boston	4–3	Connecticut	OT	
November 14	Boston	1–3	Connecticut		
November 20	Connecticut	1–5	Toronto		
November 20	Buffalo	4–3	Metropolitan	OT	
November 20	Boston	0–2	Minnesota		
November 21	Connecticut	2–3	Toronto		
November 21	Boston	2–1	Minnesota	OT	
November 21	Buffalo	3–5	Metropolitan		
December 4	Minnesota	1–5	Connecticut		
December 4	Toronto	1–2	Boston	SO	
December 5	Minnesota	2–4	Connecticut		
December 5	Toronto	2–8	Boston		
December 11	Metropolitan	1–2	Toronto		
December 11	Buffalo	—	Minnesota		Postponed
December 12	Metropolitan	0–3	Toronto		
December 12	Buffalo	—	Minnesota		Postponed
December 18	Boston	—	Metropolitan		Postponed
December 18	Connecticut	3–1	Buffalo		
December 18	Toronto	4–0	Minnesota		
December 19	Toronto	2–1	Minnesota		
December 19	Connecticut	3–1	Buffalo		
December 19	Boston	—	Metropolitan		Postponed
January 8	Minnesota	—	Toronto		Postponed
January 8	Boston	—	Buffalo		Postponed
January 9	Boston	—	Buffalo		Postponed
January 9	Minnesota	—	Toronto		Postponed
January 15	Metropolitan	1–5	Connecticut		
January 15	Buffalo	1–6	Toronto		
January 16	Buffalo	3–8	Toronto		
January 16	Metropolitan	2–3	Connecticut		
January 22	Toronto	—	Connecticut		Postponed
January 22	Minnesota	3–1	Buffalo		
January 22	Metropolitan	1–3	Boston		
January 23	Toronto	—	Connecticut		Postponed
January 23	Minnesota	6–1	Buffalo		
January 23	Metropolitan	4–3	Boston		
February 5	Connecticut	3–2	Boston		
February 5	Buffalo	1–8	Minnesota		Rescheduled from December 11
February 6	Buffalo	6–2	Minnesota		Rescheduled from December 12
February 6	Connecticut	6–1	Boston		
February 12	Minnesota	2–6	Toronto		Rescheduled from January 8
February 12	Metropolitan	2–3	Buffalo		
February 13	Minnesota	1–2	Toronto		Rescheduled from January 9
February 13	Metropolitan	3–2	Buffalo		
February 19	Metropolitan	2–5	Minnesota		
February 20	Metropolitan	7–4	Minnesota		
February 21	Toronto	0–3	Buffalo		
February 26	Toronto	4–3	Metropolitan		
February 26	Buffalo	3–4	Boston		
February 27	Buffalo	0–1	Boston		
February 27	Toronto	3-2	Metropolitan		
March 5	Boston	2–0	Metropolitan		Rescheduled from December 18
March 5	Connecticut	4–2	Minnesota		
March 6	Connecticut	4–1	Minnesota		
March 6	Boston	2–3	Metropolitan	OT	Rescheduled from December 19
March 12	Minnesota	4-2	Metropolitan		
March 12	Boston	1-2	Toronto	OT	
March 12	Buffalo	3-5	Connecticut		
March 13	Boston	3–4	Toronto	OT	
March 13	Buffalo	0-4	Connecticut		
March 13	Minnesota	3–4	Metropolitan		
March 19	Toronto	5-4	Connecticut	OT	Rescheduled from January 22
March 19	Boston	1-2	Buffalo	OT	Rescheduled from January 8
March 20	Boston	2-3	Buffalo	OT	Rescheduled from January 9
March 20	Toronto	0-5	Connecticut		Rescheduled from January 23

== Playoffs ==
The Isobel Cup playoffs were held in the Tampa Bay area at AdventHealth Center Ice in Wesley Chapel, Florida. All six teams will compete in the postseason. The preliminary rounds will be played on March 25, with the semifinals on March 27 and the championship game on March 28. The championship game will air live on ESPN2 and TSN2.

Quarterfinals; March 25
5	Minnesota Whitecaps	4
4	Metropolitan Riveters	1
6	Buffalo Beauts	0
3	Boston Pride	6

Semifinals; March 27
5	Minnesota Whitecaps	2
1	Connecticut Whale	4
3	Boston Pride	5
2	Toronto Six	1

Finals; March 28
3	Boston Pride	4
1	Connecticut Whale	2

=== Boston vs. Buffalo ===
March 25	Buffalo	0 – 6	Boston	Recap
No scoring		First period	No scoring
No scoring		Second period	8:19 – Taylor Wenczkowski – (McKenna Brand, Sammy Davis); 14:42 – pp – Kali Flanagan – (McKenna Brand, Kaleigh Fratkin); 15:14 – Jillian Dempsey – (McKenna Brand, Evelina Raselli)
No scoring		Third period	11:03 – pp – Christina Putigna – (Amanda Boulier); 12:38 – Tereza Vanišová – (Christina Putigna, Amanda Boulier); 17:37 – Mary Parker – (Kali Flanagan, Kaleigh Fratkin)
(30 saves / 36 shots) Carly Jackson		Goalie stats	Katie Burt (32 saves / 32 shots)

=== Metropolitan vs. Minnesota ===
March 25	Minnesota	4 – 1	Metropolitan	Recap
7:54 – Taylor Turnquist – (Audra Morrison, Jonna Curtis)		First period	No scoring
6:54 – Sydney Baldwin – (Jonna Curtis, Audra Morrison); 11:58 – pp – Sydney Baldwin – (Jonna Curtis, Audra Morrison)		Second period	8:42 – Kelly Babstock – (Leila Kilduff, Rose Alleva)
19:18 – en – Allie Thunstrom – (Haley Mack)		Third period	No scoring
Amanda Leveille (32 saves / 33 shots)		Goalie stats	Brooke Wolejko (29 saves / 32 shots)

=== Connecticut vs. Minnesota ===
March 27	Minnesota	2 – 4	Connecticut	Recap
No scoring		First period	No scoring
Allie Thunstrom – (Patti Marshall, Haley Mack); 15:29 – pp – Ashleigh Brykaliuk – (Sydney Baldwin, Patti Marshall)		Second period	01:23 – Kennedy Marchment – (Taylor Girard, Alyssa Wohlfeiler); 06:55 – Janine Weber – (Allie Munroe, Hannah Bates); 15:43 – Alyssa Wohlfeiler – (Kennedy Marchment, Shannon Turner); 17:10 – Tori Howran
No scoring		Third period	No scoring
Amanda Leveille (31 saves / 35 shots)		Goalie stats	Abbie Ives (22 saves / 24 shots)

=== Boston vs. Toronto ===
March 27	Boston	5 – 1	Toronto	Recap
15:39 – pp – Christina Putigna – (Lauren Kelly, Mallory Souliotis); 16:07 – pp – Kali Flanagan – (Kaleigh Fratkin); 17:53 – Kayla Friesen – (Kali Flanagan, McKenna Brand)		First period	19:26 – pp – Breanne Wilson-Bennett – (Brooke Boquist, Taylor Woods)
03:40 – Evelina Raselli		Second period	No scoring
8:08 – pp – Taylor Wenczkowski (Kaleigh Fratkin, Amanda Boulier)		Third period	No scoring
Katie Burt (18 saves / 19 shots)		Goalie stats	Elaine Chuli (23 saves / 28 shots)

=== Boston vs. Connecticut ===
March 28	Boston	4 – 2	Connecticut	Recap
4:14 – Jillian Dempsey – (Mary Parker)		First period	16:44 – Amanda Conway – (Emma Vlasic, Janine Weber)
No scoring		Second period	0:33 – Taylor Girard – (Kennedy Marchment)
6:39 – Evelina Raselli – (Mary Parker, Jillian Dempsey); 6:57 – Taylor Wenczkowski – (Christina Putigna, Kali Flanagan); 18:30 – en – Jenna Rheault		Third period	No scoring
Katie Burt (32 saves / 34 shots)		Goalie stats	Abbie Ives (26 saves / 29 shots)

== All-Star Game ==
2022 PHF All-Star Game Logo

The 2022 PHF All-Star Game was originally scheduled to take place at the home of the Toronto Six, but was moved to Buffalo, home of the Beauts, due to COVID-19 restrictions in Ontario. At the same time as the relocation announcement, it was announced that the 2023 All-Star Game would be held in Toronto.

== Draft ==
The 2021 NWHL Draft resulted in Taylor Girard being selected first overall by the Connecticut Whale.
