= Toronto Six =

Former women's professional ice hockey team in Toronto, Ontario

- City: Toronto, Ontario
- League: Premier Hockey Federation
- Founded: 2020
- Folded: 2023
- Home arena: Canlan Ice Sports – York
- Colours: Red, gold, black
- Owners: Angela James, Anthony Stewart, Bernice Carnegie, Ted Nolan
- General manager: Angela James
- Head coach: Geraldine Heaney
- Captain: Shiann Darkangelo

Championships
- Regular season titles: 0
- Playoff championships: 1 (2023)

The Toronto Six were a professional ice hockey team in Toronto, playing out of Canlan Ice Sports – York. They were one of two Canadian teams in the Premier Hockey Federation (PHF) along with the Montreal Force, and the first expansion team to join the league since the collapse of the Canadian Women's Hockey League (CWHL) in 2019. The team was founded in 2020 with their inaugural regular season held in Lake Placid, New York, followed by the Isobel Cup playoffs in Brighton, Massachusetts.

The Six won the 2023 Isobel Cup. This made the Six the PHF's final championship team as the league and its teams were dissolved to make way for the new Professional Women's Hockey League, a unified professional league effectively consolidating the PHF and the Professional Women's Hockey Players Association.

== History ==
Following the 2018–19 season, the Canadian Women's Hockey League (CWHL) and its teams—including the Toronto Furies—ceased operations, citing the fragmentation of corporate sponsors between the CWHL and National Women's Hockey League (NWHL), which caused their league to be financially infeasible. The NWHL then announced it was pursuing adding two CWHL markets to the league, Montreal and Toronto, for the 2019–20 season if the NWHL found financial backers for the teams. The league was not able to set up the new teams before the start of the season, partially due to a player strike that resulted in the creation of the Professional Women's Hockey Players Association.

On April 22, 2020, the new Toronto NWHL franchise was officially announced as the league's sixth team and first original expansion team (the Minnesota Whitecaps joined the league's original four teams after being an independent team). The team's ownership was announced as a group of Boston-based investors headed by Johanna Neilson Boynton, a former competitor with the Harvard Crimson women's ice hockey program. Margaret "Digit" Murphy, former head coach of the Brown Bears, Boston Blades, and Kunlun Red Star WIH, became team president, while sports executive Tyler Tumminia was announced as the team's chairman. The team simultaneously announced its first five signed players as Kristen Barbara, Elaine Chuli, Shiann Darkangelo, Emma Greco, and Taylor Woods. All five were former players in the CWHL. The team held the first overall pick in the 2020 NWHL Draft, but traded the pick to the Boston Pride. It was also the first trade in franchise history. The first player drafted by Toronto was Jaycee Gebhard, an alumna of the Robert Morris Colonials women's ice hockey program, with the sixth overall pick in the 2020 NWHL Draft. The team announced Mandy Cronin, CWHL co-founder and former goaltender of the Buffalo Beauts, as general manager on May 11, 2020.

The team name, colours, and logo were announced by the NWHL on May 19, 2020. The name was chosen from over 300 entries submitted in an online poll and was chosen because the team is the sixth NWHL team founded for the sixth NWHL season, as well as there being six players on the ice. The Six is also a nickname for the city of Toronto, referring to the city's 416 area code, as well as the current municipality's original cities of Old Toronto, North York, Scarborough, York and Etobicoke plus the borough of East York. The team colours were revealed as red and gold, the former representing the country of Canada and the latter representing the Golden Horseshoe. The logo is a combination of the letter "T", "O" and the number 6, with a maple leaf in the middle.

On October 1, 2020, the team announced that they had agreed to a partnership with Canlan Ice Sports for the team to play their inaugural season at Canlan Ice Sports – York. On October 13, Tyler Tumminia stepped down as club chairperson to become interim NWHL commissioner. On October 20, the club announced team president Digit Murphy would also be the inaugural head coach.

In January 2021, the team announced a partnership with the ECHL's Brampton Beast with the expectation of holding joint camps, practices, fan events, and double headers together, with Beast general manager Cary Kaplan stating that "We feel that we have a lot in common, as many people have still not appreciated or experienced both the exceptional level of hockey in the ECHL, or the equally strong fan experience that the Beast provide." The Beast's head coach Spiros Anastas then joined the Six during the 2020–21 season as an assistant coach while the Beast were inactive due to the pandemic. However, the Beast ceased operations entirely in February 2021.

=== Inaugural season ===
Due to the ongoing restrictions during the COVID-19 pandemic, the Six started their inaugural season in a bubble with the rest of the league in Lake Placid, New York, in January 2021. The leadership for the inaugural season included Shiann Darkangelo appointed as the first team captain in franchise history, while Emma Woods and Emma Greco served as alternate captains. The Six played their first game on January 23 against the Metropolitan Riveters, losing by 3–0. The following day, Lindsay Eastwood scored the first goal in franchise history via a power play in an eventual 6–5 shootout loss to the Minnesota Whitecaps with assists credited to Emma Woods and Shiann Darkangelo. Breanne Wilson-Bennett scored twice in the game, recording the first multi-goal game by a player for the team. Other Six players to score versus Minnesota included Mikyla Grant-Mentis and Taylor Woods. The Six earned their first win on January 26, 2021, with a 2–1 victory over the Boston Pride. The Six came back from a 1–0 deficit with a pair of third period goals by Brooke Boquist and Mikyla Grant-Mentis, whose goal stood as the game-winner. Boquist was named the First Star of the game, while Elaine Chuli recorded 24 saves in the win.

The Six went on to win their three remaining games to clinch the top seed for the Isobel Cup playoffs. On February 3, 2021, the season was suspended due to positive cases of COVID-19 within the bubble. On March 8, 2021, the league announced that the Isobel Cup playoffs would be held March 26–27 at Warrior Ice Arena in Brighton, Massachusetts. The Six lost their semifinal game to the fourth-seed and eventual champion Boston Pride 6–2.

Following their inaugural season, assistant coach Lisa Haley, who had also coached in Toronto as head coach for the Ryerson Rams women's ice hockey program, was appointed as the league's senior vice president of hockey operations. Six forward Mikyla Grant-Mentis became the most decorated player in a single NWHL season, Grant-Mentis earned a record four accolades. She won the NWHL's Most Valuable Player award, the first Black player to win the league's MVP, tied as the leading scorer in the league, and captured the league's Newcomer of the Year award.

=== Transition in second season ===
In May 2021, the owners of the Six also bought the Metropolitan Riveters as part of the league's push to have all teams be independently owned. In September 2021, the league rebranded as the Premier Hockey Federation (PHF) to promote inclusivity.

On June 7, 2021, Mark Joslin, previously head coach of the Ontario Junior Hockey League's Toronto Patriots, was hired to replace Digit Murphy as head coach, becoming the first black head coach in NWHL history. Murphy retained her position as team president. The Six added Hockey Hall of Fame member Angela James to their coaching staff on June 24. At the end of June, Krysti Clarke, previously the manager of operations with York United FC of Canadian Premier League soccer, replaced Mandy Cronin as general manager. With five picks among the top ten in the 2021 NWHL Draft, three of the picks were in the first round. Picking third overall, the Six selected Maegan Beres from Boston College, followed by Tatum Skaggs fourth overall, and York Lions skater Taylor Davison with the fifth pick, marking the second straight season that the Six have drafted a player from a U Sports women's ice hockey program. In addition, Davison made U Sports history, becoming the highest drafted player from the league.

Towards the end of the 2021–22 season, the team was sold to a new ownership group including Anthony Stewart, Angela James, Bernice Carnegie, and Ted Nolan.

=== Third season ===
On May 31, 2022, co-owner Angela James was promoted from assistant coach to general manager of the Six. Additionally, Digit Murphy would be leaving her post as the Six's team president and director of player personnel to join the Metropolitan Riveters as their new team president, but would "maintain involvement, advising on the logistics of the team" while "transitioning from her role as President." On June 14, 2022, the Six announced the hiring of Geraldine Heaney as their third head coach in franchise history. On September 27, 2022, Sportsnet reported that Sami Jo Small joined the leadership as team president.

On March 26, 2023, the team won the Isobel Cup Championship, defeating the Minnesota Whitecaps 4–3 in overtime at the Mullett Arena in Tempe, Arizona.

==== Ceasing operations ====
After the season, it was announced that the PHF had been purchased as part of a bid to create a new, unified professional women's league. This resulted in the folding of the PHF and its teams. The new league—the Professional Women's Hockey League—debuted in 2024 with the new Toronto franchise hosting the inaugural game on New Year's Day. 10 former Six players were selected in the 2023 PWHL draft, the most of any former PHF team.

== Season-by-season records ==
Note: GP = Games played, W = Wins, L = Losses, OTL = Overtime losses, SOL = Shootout losses, Pts = Points, GF = Goals for, GA = Goals against

Season	GP	W	L	OTL	SOL	Pts (Note: Starting with the 2021–22 season, 3 points are awarded for a regulation win, 2 points are awarded for an overtime/shootout win, 1 point is awarded for an overtime/shootout loss, 0 points are awarded for a regulation loss)	GF	GA	Playoffs
2020–21	6	4	1	0	1	9	21	14	Lost semifinal game to Boston Pride
2021–22	20	16	3	1	0	46	66	45	Lost semifinal game to Boston Pride
2022–23	24	17	5	2	0	51	87	62	Won Isobel Cup Championship over Minnesota Whitecaps
Totals	50	37	9	3	1	106	174	121	

== Team ==
=== 2022–23 roster ===
As of January 26, 2023

No.	Nat	Player	Pos	S/G	Age	Acquired	Birthplace
19	(Canada)	Brooke Boquist	F	L	30	2020	Thunder Bay, Ontario
86	(Canada)	Michela Cava	F	R	32	2022	Thunder Bay, Ontario
29	(Canada)	Elaine Chuli	G	L	30	2020	Waterford, Ontario
27	(United States)	Shiann Darkangelo (C)	F	L	32	2020	Royal Oak, Michigan
20	(Canada)	Taylor Davison	D	L	28	2021	Oakville, Ontario
44	(Canada)	Lindsay Eastwood	D	L	29	2020	Kanata, Ontario
3	(Canada)	Nadine Edney	F	L	30	2022	Mississauga, Ontario
14	(Canada)	Courtney Gardiner	F	R	28	2022	Goderich, Ontario
25	(Canada)	Emma Greco	D	L	31	2022	Burlington, Ontario
41	(Canada)	Brittany Howard	F	R	31	2022	St. Thomas, Ontario
70	(Canada)	Carly Jackson	G	L	29	2022	Amherst, Nova Scotia
96	(Czech Republic)	Dominika Lásková	D	R	29	2022	Prague, Czechia
8	(Canada)	Leah Lum	F	L	30	2022	Richmond, British Columbia
9	(Canada)	Kati Tabin	D	L	29	2022	Winnipeg, Manitoba
10	(Canada)	Lexi Templeman	F	R	27	2022	Staffa, Ontario
71	(Canada)	Saroya Tinker	D	R	28	2021	Oshawa, Ontario
21	(Czech Republic)	Tereza Vanišová	F	L	30	2022	Strakonice, Czechia
4	(Canada)	Daryl Watts	F	L	27	2023	Toronto, Ontario
11	(Canada)	Breanne Wilson-Bennett (A)	F	L	30	2020	Markham, Ontario
48	(Canada)	Alexis Woloschuk	D	L	32	2022	Winnipeg, Manitoba
67	(Canada)	Emma Woods (A)	F	R	27	2020	Burford, Ontario
2	(Canada)	Taylor Woods (A)	D	R	32	2020	Morden, Manitoba

Coaching staff and team personnel

- Head coach: Geraldine Heaney
- Assistant coach: Kevin Greco
- Assistant coach: Jessica Turi
- Goaltending coach: Nick Grainger
- Head athletic therapist: Cam Borody
- Equipment manager: Kris Franzoi

Front office

- President: Sami Jo Small
- General manager: Angela James

=== Captains ===
- Shiann Darkangelo, 2020–2023

=== Head coaches ===
- Digit Murphy, 2020–2021
- Mark Joslin, 2021–2022
- Geraldine Heaney, 2022–2023

=== General managers ===
- Mandy Cronin, 2020–2021
- Krysti Clarke, 2021–2022
- Angela James, 2022–2023

== Franchise milestones and statistics leaders ==
Milestone	Player	Notes
First penalty	Emma Greco	January 23, 2021
First goal	Lindsay Eastwood; Assisted by Shiann Darkangelo and Emma Woods	January 24, 2021
First multi-goal game	Breanne Wilson-Bennett	January 26, 2021
First win	Elaine Chuli	January 26, 2021
First playoff goal	Breanne Wilson-Bennett	March 26, 2021

== Awards and honors ==
- Mikyla Grant-Mentis: 2021 Most Valuable Player, 2021 Newcomer of the Year, 2021 Foundation Award, 2021 Fans' Three Stars
- Shiann Darkangelo, 2023 PHF Foundation Award
