= Brooke Boquist =

Canadian ice hockey centre

- Born: July 27, 1996 (age 29) Thunder Bay, Ontario, Canada
- Height: 5 ft 4 in (163 cm)
- Weight: 119 lb (54 kg; 8 st 7 lb)
- Position: Centre
- Shoots: Left
- Played for: Toronto Six; Leksands IF; MODO Hockey; Providence Friars
- Playing career: 2014–present

Brooke Boquist (born July 27, 1996) is a Canadian ice hockey centre. She most recently played in the Premier Hockey Federation (PHF) with the Toronto Six during the 2022–23 season.

== Playing career ==
Across 139 NCAA Division I games with the Providence Friars of Hockey East, Boquist scored 91 points. She led the team in goals during the 2015–16 and 2016–17 seasons, and served as an assistant captain for the team during the latter. She studied management while attending Providence College.

=== Professional ===
After graduating, she signed her first professional contract with Modo Hockey Dam of the Swedish Women's Hockey League (SDHL), having been recruited as a potential top-line centre after several star players left the club. She would score 20 points in 17 games in her rookie SDHL season before being sidelined with a concussion. She joined Leksands IF Dam the next season, her signing being announced in mid-October after the club picked up only two points in their first nine games. She posted 29 points in 24 games with Leksands, finishing first on the team for goals and second in points. She earned the SDHL Goal of the Week Award in the third week of 2020.

In May 2020, she announced she was returning to North America alongside Leksands teammate Emma Woods to sign with the NWHL expansion team the Toronto Six. Boquist logged her first-ever goal in NWHL play in a 2–1 triumph against the eventual Isobel Cup champion Boston Pride. Opposing the Pride on January 26, 2021, the Six fought back from a 1–0 deficit with a pair of third period goals by Boquist and Mikyla Grant-Mentis. Boquist was named the First Star of the Game, while Elaine Chuli recorded 24 svaes in the win.

== Career statistics ==
			Regular season					Playoffs
Season	Team	League	GP	G	A	Pts	PIM	GP	G	A	Pts	PIM
2014–15	Providence Friars	NCAA	33	5	5	10	14	-	-	-	-	-
2015–16	Providence Friars	NCAA	33	12	10	22	28	-	-	-	-	-
2016-17	Providence Friars	NCAA	36	18	14	32	34	-	-	-	-	-
2017-18	Providence Friars	NCAA	37	14	13	27	30	-	-	-	-	-
2018–19	Modo Hockey	SDHL	17	11	9	20	14	-	-	-	-	-
2019–20	Leksands IF	SDHL	24	14	15	29	28	2	0	0	0	6
SDHL totals			41	25	24	49	42	2	0	0	0	6
