= Shiann Darkangelo =

American ice hockey player (born 1993)

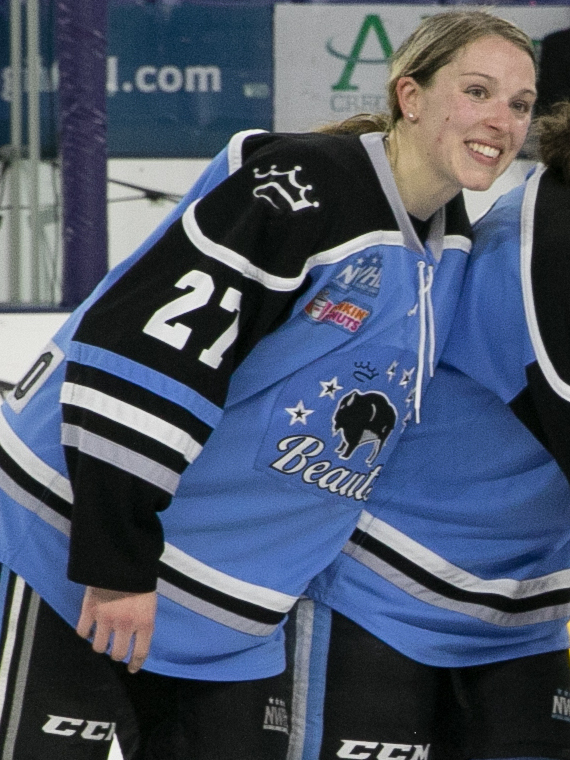
- Darkangelo with the Buffalo Beauts in 2017
- Born: November 28, 1993 (age 32) Royal Oak, Michigan, U.S.
- Height: 5 ft 11 in (180 cm)
- Weight: 146 lb (66 kg; 10 st 6 lb)
- Position: Forward
- Shoots: Left
- PWHL team Former teams: Detroit Clutch; Ottawa Charge; PWHL Boston; Toronto Furies; Kunlun Red Star; Buffalo Beauts; Connecticut Whale; Toronto Six; Montreal Victoire
- Played for: Syracuse Orange; Quinnipiac Bobcats
- National team: United States
- Playing career: 2011–present
Medal record
World Championships
Gold medal – first place	2016 Canada

Shiann Darkangelo (born November 28, 1993) is an American professional ice hockey player for the Detroit Clutch of the Professional Women's Hockey League (PWHL). She has played at the international level with Team USA and won gold at the 2016 IIHF Women's World Championship with the team. At the NCAA Division I level, she accumulated 42 points with the Syracuse Orange women's ice hockey program during the 2011–12 and 2012–13 seasons and registered 60 points with the Quinnipiac Bobcats women's ice hockey program during the 2013–14 and 2014–15 seasons. She was team captain of the Toronto Six roster that won the 2023 Isobel Cup championship.

== Playing career ==
=== Premier Hockey Federation ===
Darkangelo played the 2015 season with the Connecticut Whale in the Premier Hockey Federation (PHF) and was selected to participate in the 1st NWHL All-Star Game. On July 31, Darkangelo signed a one-year contract for $21,000 with the Buffalo Beauts. She was selected to participate in the 2nd NWHL All-Star Game in 2017.

In April 2020, after one year spent playing with the GTA West chapter of the PWHPA, she was announced as one of the first five players signed the Toronto Six, the first NWHL team in Canada. The initial group comprised two defensemen, one goaltender, and two forwards, Darkangelo and Taylor Woods.

=== CWHL ===
Darkangelo spent the 2017–18 CWHL season playing for the Canadian Women's Hockey League expansion team Kunlun Red Star based in Shenzhen, China. Darkangelo's first point with the Red Star took place on October 28, 2017, on a power play goal at the 1:43 mark of a second period match against the Calgary Inferno.

Darkangelo's goal was assisted by Hongxin Yan and Zhixin Liu, who all gained their first career CWHL points on the play.

On August 2, 2018, Darkangelo signed a contract with the Toronto Furies.

=== NWHL ===
One year following the dissolution of the CWHL, the NWHL announced an expansion team for Toronto. Dubbed the Six, the leadership for their inaugural season (2020–21) included Darkangelo, appointed as the first team captain in franchise history, while Emma Woods and Emma Greco served as alternate captains. Collobrating with Emma Woods, they would assist on the first goal scored in Toronto Six franchise history. Scored by Lindsay Eastwood, the goal took place in the second game of the 2020–21 NWHL season, scored against Minnesota Whitecaps goaltender Amanda Leveille .

=== PWHL ===
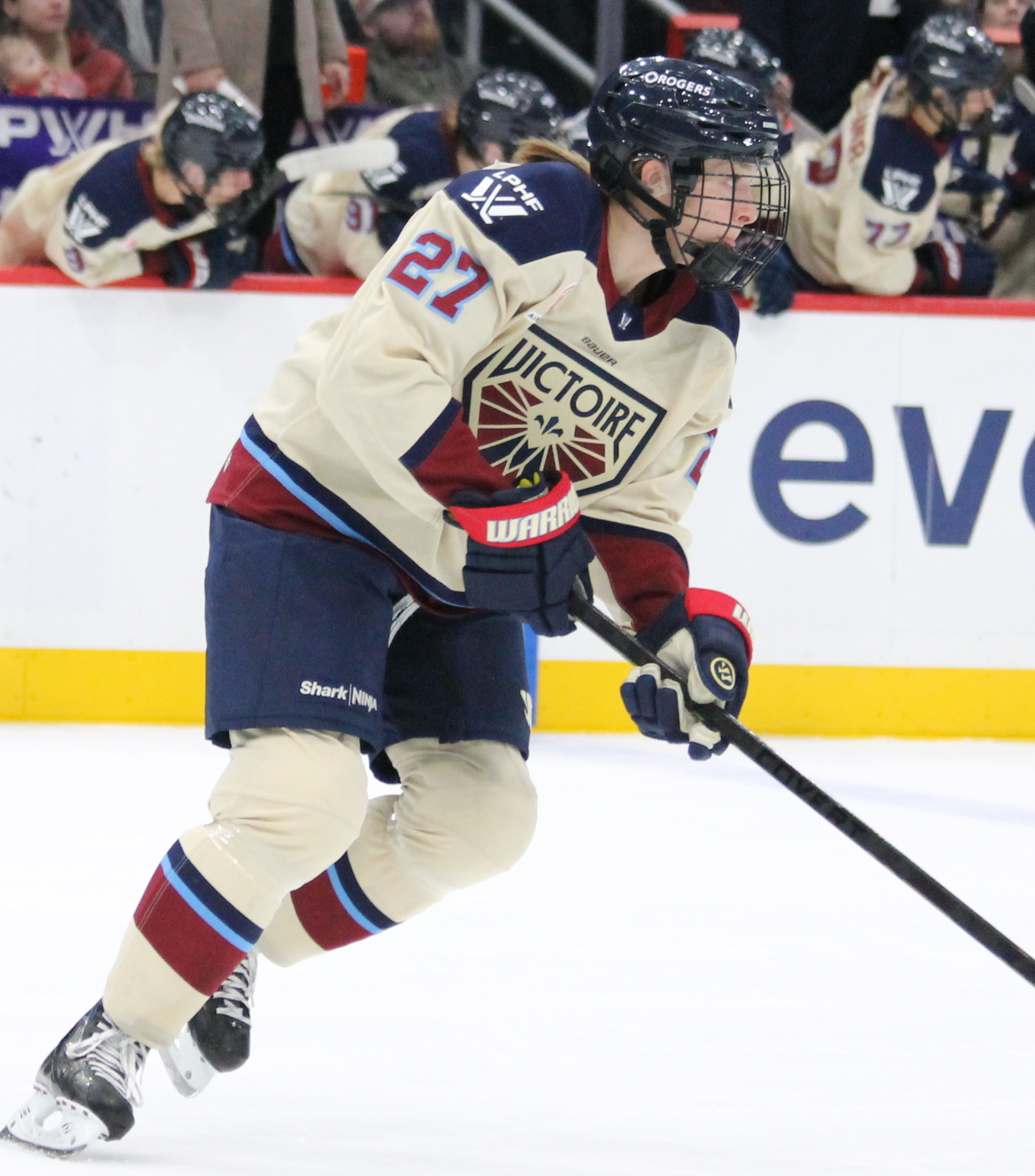
Darkangelo with the Montreal Victoire in 2026

Darkangelo signed with PWHL Boston prior to the beginning of the PWHL's inaugural season in 2024. On March 18, 2024, she was traded to PWHL Ottawa in exchange for Lexie Adzija and Caitrin Lonergan. On June 26, 2024, she signed a one-year contract extension with Ottawa. During the 2024–25 season, she recorded eight goals and nine assists in 29 games.

On June 17, 2025, she signed a two-year contract with the Montreal Victoire. During the 2025–26 season, she recorded four goals and four assists in 30 regular season games and one goal in nine games during the 2026 Walter Cup playoffs to help the Victoire win the Walter Cup.

During the league's expansion to 12 teams ahead of the 2026–27 season, she signed a two-year contract with the Detroit Clutch on June 14, 2026.

== International play ==
In 2011, Darkangelo won the gold medal with USA Hockey at the U18 IIHF Women's World Championships. In 2016, she would win gold with the US at the senior IIHF Women's World Championships, picking up 4 points in 5 games.

== Personal life ==
Darkangelo was born in Royal Oak, Michigan and raised in Brighton, Michigan. She has five siblings, three brothers, Anthony, Austin, and Isaac; and two sisters, Mariah and Ciara. Her younger brother Isaac is a professional football player.

Darkangelo follows a plant-based diet. She is a certified plant-based nutritionist and owner of Plant-Based Performance, a whole foods, plant-based lifestyle coaching company.

She is a member of the LGBTQ community and in a relationship with New York Sirens goaltender, Elaine Chuli.

== Career statistics ==
=== Regular season and playoffs ===
			Regular season					Playoffs
Season	Team	League	GP	G	A	Pts	PIM	GP	G	A	Pts	PIM
2009–10	Detroit Little Caesars	T1EHL U19	18	12	8	20	6	5	1	4	5	0
2010–11	Detroit Little Caesars	T1EHL U19	11	2	10	12	6	5	3	1	4	6
2011–12	Syracuse Orange	NCAA	35	7	11	18	48	—	—	—	—	—
2012–13	Syracuse Orange	NCAA	35	16	8	24	57	—	—	—	—	—
2013–14	Quinnipiac Bobcats	NCAA	37	23	17	40	16	—	—	—	—	—
2014–15	Quinnipiac Bobcats	NCAA	37	10	10	20	14	—	—	—	—	—
2015–16	Connecticut Whale	NWHL	13	10	3	13	0	3	0	2	2	0
2016–17	Buffalo Beauts	NWHL	16	7	5	12	6	2	0	1	1	0
2017–18	Kunlun Red Star	CWHL	27	10	8	18	32	4	1	0	1	6
2018–19	Toronto Furies	CWHL	27	6	4	10	22	3	0	1	1	0
2019–20	GTA West	PWHPA	—	—	—	—	—	—	—	—	—	—
2020–21	Toronto Six	NWHL	6	0	3	3	21	1	0	1	1	0
2021–22	Toronto Six	PHF	20	8	12	20	10	1	0	0	0	0
2022–23	Toronto Six	PHF	24	12	13	25	16	0	0	0	0	0
2023–24	PWHL Boston	PWHL	17	0	1	1	0	—	—	—	—	—
2023–24	PWHL Ottawa	PWHL	7	0	0	0	4	—	—	—	—	—
2024–25	Ottawa Charge	PWHL	29	8	9	17	12	8	1	0	1	0
2025–26	Montréal Victoire	PWHL	30	4	4	8	4	9	1	0	1	0
NWHL totals			77	36	35	71	53	7	0	4	4	0
CWHL totals			54	16	12	28	54	7	1	1	2	6
PHF totals			44	20	25	45	26	1	0	0	0	0
PWHL totals			83	12	14	26	20	17	2	0	2	0

Sources: USCHO.com, Elite Prospects, HockeyDB, NWHL, CWHL

=== International ===
Year	Team	Event	Result	GP	G	A	Pts	PIM
2011	United States	U18	1st place, gold medalist(s)	5	2	1	3	0
2016	United States	WC	1st place, gold medalist(s)	5	1	3	4	0
Junior totals				5	2	1	3	0
Senior totals				5	1	3	4	0

Source: Elite Prospects, USA Hockey

== Awards and honors ==
=== Collegiate ===
Award	Year
CHA All-Tournament Team	2011–12
Syracuse University Letterwinner; Women's Ice Hockey	2011–2013

=== Professional ===
- 2023 PHF Foundation Award
- Walter Cup champion (2026)
