= 2020–21 NWHL season =

- League: National Women's Hockey League
- Sport: Ice hockey
- Duration: January 23 – March 27, 2021
- Teams: 6
- Total attendance: 0 (COVID-19 bubble)
- TV partner(s): Twitch; NBC Sports Network (Isobel Cup final & semifinals)

Regular season
- Season champions: Toronto Six
- Season MVP: Mikyla Grant-Mentis (Toronto)
- Top scorer: Tied at 9 points: Kaleigh Fratkin (Boston); Mikyla Grant-Mentis (Toronto)

Isobel Cup
- Champions: Boston Pride
- Runners-up: Minnesota Whitecaps
- Finals MVP: Jillian Dempsey

NWHL seasons
- 2019–20 2021–22

The 2020–21 NWHL season was the sixth season of the National Women's Hockey League in North America. Due to the ongoing COVID-19 pandemic, the season was held in a bubble in Lake Placid, New York, from January to February 2021, with all five teams returning from the previous season, along with the Toronto Six expansion team as the first Canada-based team to play in the league. The season was suspended again due to positive cases of COVID-19 within the bubble. On March 8, 2021, the league announced that the Isobel Cup playoffs would re-commence on March 26 and 27 at Warrior Ice Arena in Brighton, Massachusetts.

== League business ==
At the end of April 2020, the NWHL announced the expansion of league with the addition of a new team in Toronto called the Toronto Six. As part of the expansion announcement, the league stated it planned to have a delayed start to the 2020–21 regular season due to the on-going COVID-19 pandemic, beginning in mid-November 2020 and the Isobel Cup playoffs to begin in March 2021, with each team playing 20 games. Players in the Professional Women's Hockey Players Association (PWHPA), formed after the 2019 collapse of the Canadian Women's Hockey League, continued to hold out from all North American hockey leagues for planned 2021 Dream Gap Tour. In July 2020, the planned start date was pushed back again to January 2021 with each team still set to play 20 games.

In October 2020, the league reorganized its governance structure in the aim of prioritizing independent ownership of teams as the expansion into Toronto added another independently owned team. As part of the reorganization, Dani Rylan stepped down as league commissioner to lead the search for independent ownership of the four league-owned teams, while Tyler Tumminia became the interim commissioner. A six-member board of governors was created with the intent of each team having single representative.

At the end of November, the Minnesota Whitecaps revealed their jersey designs for the season, the last team in the league to do so. The jerseys for most teams were designed in-house, led by Ksenia Selemon, the director of marketing for the four league-owned teams. In early December 2020, the league announced a partnership with analytics company Stathletes, led by Meghan Chayka, to provide data and statistics for the season. The league also announced a partnership with InStat Hockey to provide video analysis services.

Before the start of the season, the league announced that all jerseys worn during the season would carry a patch stating "End Racism" and would support any players kneeling for the anthem in protest against racism. The league, however, did not announce any further details on how it planned to combat racism in the sport. On January 26, the league released a statement condemning Barstool Sports after Barstool CEO Erika Nardini targeted several women's hockey reporters and league staff with harassment on social media. Barstool had previously faced criticism following repeated misogynistic and racist incidents, with Metropolitan Riveters rookie Saroya Tinker notably being the first NWHL player to publicly condemn the company. The league's statement further clarified that it would not accept club ownership bids from companies that did not share the league's values.

In mid-January 2021, Boston Pride general manager Hayley Moore announced that she would be leaving the league at the end of the bubble season to start a new role as vice president of hockey operations with the American Hockey League, becoming one of the highest-ranking female executives in men's ice hockey leagues in the world.

During the season, the league announced it had secured a sponsorship with Discover Card, the NWHL's largest sponsorship to date. Discover is also a major sponsor of the National Hockey League. As part of the deal, Discover became the presenting sponsor of the Isobel Cup playoffs. Financial terms of the agreement were not disclosed. Before the playoffs began, the league added Dick's Sporting Goods as the presenting sponsor of the Isobel Cup trophy and playoff most valuable player award.

=== COVID-19 bubble ===
The league had originally planned to play a full season under a "sprint to the Cup" model, with the full 20 game season playing out over 10 weeks, but by October 2020, with the pandemic worsening and leagues such as the NFL failing to keep their players safe, the NWHL leadership decided that they would need to change formats. On November 25, 2020, the league announced the entire season would be held in a bubble with all games at Herb Brooks Arena in Lake Placid, New York, from January 23 to February 5, 2021. In the announced schedule, each of the six teams would play five games, one against each other team, before a round-robin tournament for final seeding of the Isobel Cup playoffs. The playoffs were to be single game semifinals with the championship game taking place on February 5. The plan was to follow similar bubble models that had been used successfully at the 2020 NWSL Challenge Cup and the 2020 WNBA Playoffs.

One of the main concerns with the bubble format was the part-time professional status of the league. Since the maximum league salary is US$15,000, almost all players hold full-time jobs outside of hockey, including several who work in healthcare. After negotiations with the Premier Hockey Federation Players' Association, the league guaranteed that players would be paid the same salary as they would have received for a full season of play. Players were also given the option to opt out of the tournament without losing their salary. The league partnered with the Yale School of Public Health to provide COVID-19 testing to players and staff inside the bubble. The tests were the SalivaDirect developed at Yale, an RNA polymerase chain reaction (PCR) test, the same as used by the 2020 NBA Bubble. The university was to run a quality improvement study during the season, using paired saliva and nasal samples, which can provide two concurrent results.

On December 2, 2020, the league released its logo for the bubble tournament featuring six snowflakes around its edges to represent the league's six teams. The logo was painted on the center ice of Herb Brooks Arena, marking the first time in league history that games were played on an ice surface specifically marked for the league. While the stands were empty of live spectators during games due to the nature of a COVID-19 bubble, the league followed other leagues in offering fans the chance to appear in the arena during games in the form of fan cutouts. A number of teams from other leagues, such as the NWSL, the WNBA, the NHL, and the National Premier Soccer League, purchased cutouts of their players. Some teams plan to have their athletes autograph the cutouts after the end of the bubble season in order to auction them to raise funds for youth girls' hockey.

In January 2021, former Buffalo Beauts' goaltender Mariah Fujimagari was named as the emergency back-up goaltender for all teams in the event that no goaltenders were available due to injury or positive COVID-19 tests.

On January 28, the Metropolitan Riveters were forced to withdraw from the bubble after three games played after at least ten members of the organization testing positive for COVID-19. The league then postponed any games scheduled for January 28 and reorganized the schedule for the rest of the regular season games. The Connecticut Whale forfeited their final game on February 1 and withdrew from the playoffs citing the need to protect the health and safety of their players.

On February 3, as a result of more positive cases of COVID-19 across the league within the bubble, the season was suspended before the playoffs. It was not announced if the league would try to have the playoffs at a later date. Following the suspension of the season, commissioner Tumminia called the bubble a "restricted access zone" in that it was modified from bubbles utilized by other leagues. All personnel within the zone had been required to provide a negative test 72 hours before arriving in Lake Placid and another test when they arrived. The league did utilize a taxi squad for teams to sign players when they had to fill a roster spot due to a positive test or injury, utilized by Buffalo, Connecticut, and Minnesota; the taxi squad players were also subject to the same testing requirements before the season started and when they arrived. The league does not know where first case of the virus occurred within the bubble, but by the time the season was suspended all teams had multiple positive tests including Boston head coach Paul Mara and Minnesota head coach Jack Brodt.

On March 8, 2021, the league announced that the Isobel Cup playoffs would be held on March 26–27 at Warrior Ice Arena in Brighton, Massachusetts.

=== Broadcasting ===
The league entered its second season of its broadcasting deal with Twitch for regular season games. In December 2020, the league announced an additional broadcasting deal with the NBC Sports Network for the Isobel Cup final and semifinals, the first time that professional women's hockey isto be aired live on a major TV network in the United States.

The broadcast team for the season was located remotely in Fort Lauderdale, Florida, in the same studio used by the National Women's Soccer League during their 2020 bubble season. It consisted of Erica Ayala, Alexis Pearson, and Katie Gaus as analysts and Steve Goldstein, Josh Appel, and Josh Eastern as play-by-play announcers.

=== Officiating ===
In December 2020, the league announced that all ten officials used during the season would be women, selected in collaboration with USA Hockey. Of the ten USA Hockey officials, seven had been assigned roles by the International Ice Hockey Federation (IIHF) at the 2020 senior or junior women's world championships, notably Kendall Hanley, who had served as a linesman at the 2020 IIHF World Women's U18 Championship, and Jackie Spresser, who had been due to serve as a linesman at the 2020 IIHF Women's World Championship before it was cancelled due to the pandemic. Of the other officials with international experience in 2020, Jamie Huntley-Park and Mackenzie Welter had served at the 2020 IIHF World Women's U18 Championship Division I, Sarah Buckner and Erika Greenen at 2020 IIHF World Women's U18 Championship Division II, Laura White at the 2020 IIHF Women's World Championship Division III. The other three officials are Alicia Hanrahan, Jacqueline Howard, and Amanda Tassoni.

=== Team partnerships ===
In January 2021, the Toronto Six announced a partnership with the ECHL's Brampton Beast with the expectation of holding joint camps, practices, fan events, and double headers together, with Beast general manager Cary Kaplan stating that "We feel that we have a lot in common, as many people have still not appreciated or experienced both the exceptional level of hockey in the ECHL, or the equally strong fan experience that the Beast provide." The Beast were one of many teams to opt out of the 2020–21 ECHL season and the Beast head coach, Spiro Anastas, joined the Six as an assistant in Lake Placid. One month later, the Beast ceased operations entirely. The Boston Pride and the Minnesota Whitecaps remained partnered with the National Hockey League's Boston Bruins and Minnesota Wild, respectively.

=== Front office changes ===
General managers
Off–season
Team	2019–20 GM	2020–21 GM	Notes
Buffalo Beauts	Mandy Cronin	Nate Oliver	After one year as Buffalo general manager, Cronin left to join the expansion Toronto Six. She was replaced by Nate Oliver.
Connecticut Whale	Bray Ketchum	Amy Scheer	Ketchum left the Whale to focus on her teaching career. She was replaced by former New York Liberty vice-president Amy Scheer in August 2020.
Toronto Six	None	Mandy Cronin	Cronin joined the expansion Toronto Six after leaving the Buffalo Beauts.

(*) Indicates interim.

== Regular season ==
=== Standings ===
At the conclusion of the regular season.

Team	GP	W	L	OTL	PTS	Pts%	GF	GA
Toronto Six	6	4	1	1	9	.750	21	14
Minnesota Whitecaps	4	3	1	0	6	.750	12	10
Connecticut Whale	4	2	2	0	4	.500	9	12
Boston Pride	7	3	4	0	6	.429	22	11
Buffalo Beauts	6	1	4	1	3	.250	7	24
Metropolitan Riveters	3	2	1	0	4	.667	7	4

=== Schedule ===
All games take place at Herb Brooks Arena in Lake Placid, New York. The regular season was originally scheduled to have each team face each other team once, followed by a seeded round-robin tournament for an additional two games per team to set the final playoff qualification. The team with the best record after seven games would be the regular season champion and top seed in the playoffs.

However, after the Riveters were forced to withdraw from the season on January 28, the round-robin was changed to only the top three teams, ranked based on points percentage at the time, to set the playoff seeding between the three teams. The bottom two teams, Boston and Buffalo, played a best-of-three play-in series for the fourth seed in the playoffs. Toronto then won the round-robin and the top seed in the playoffs by defeating Minnesota and Connecticut. On February 1, the Whale forfeited their final game and withdrew from the playoffs, giving Minnesota the second playoff seed, the winner of the play-in series between Boston and Buffalo the third seed, and the loser the fourth. However, the originally scheduled playoffs would also be postponed, leading to the Whale taking part in the rescheduled tournament.

Regular season schedule
Date	Visitor	Score	Home	OT	Notes
January 23	Toronto	0–3	Metropolitan		
January 23	Boston	1–2	Minnesota		
January 23	Connecticut	2–1	Buffalo	SO	
January 24	Minnesota	6–5	Toronto	SO	
January 24	Metropolitan	4–3	Connecticut		
January 24	Buffalo	1–5	Boston		
January 26	Minnesota	1–0	Metropolitan		
January 26	Toronto	2–1	Boston		
January 27	Boston	1–4	Connecticut		
January 27	Buffalo	2–4	Toronto		This game was originally scheduled to be between the Riveters and Beauts, but the league replaced the Riveters with the Six due to the NWHL's medical protocols. Buffalo was originally scheduled to play Toronto on January 28.
~~January 28~~	~~Buffalo~~	–	~~Metropolitan~~		This game was originally scheduled to be between the Six and Beauts; the match-up was swapped with the Beauts' game the previous day. However, the game was cancelled when the Riveters were forced to withdraw from the season entirely due to positive cases of COVID-19.
~~January 28~~	~~Connecticut~~	–	~~Minnesota~~		Game was postponed following the Riveters' withdrawal from the season.
Original schedule prior to Riveters withdrawal: January 30 / Connecticut / – / Toronto; January 30 / Minnesota / – / Buffalo; January 30 / ~~Boston~~ / – / ~~Metropolitan~~ / Game cancelled following the Riveters' withdrawal from the season.; January 31 round-robin play / Seed #4 / – / Seed #3; January 31 round-robin play / Seed #6 / – / Seed #2; January 31 round-robin play / Seed #5 / – / Seed #1; February 2 round-robin play / Seed #6 / – / Seed #1; February 2 round-robin play / Seed #4 / – / Seed #2; February 3 round-robin play / Seed #5 / – / Seed #3
Adjusted end of season schedule
January 30	#5 Buffalo	2–1	#4 Boston		Game 1
January 30	#3 Toronto	4–3	#1 Minnesota		
January 31	#5 Buffalo	0–6	#4 Boston		Game 2
January 31	#3 Toronto	6–0	#2 Connecticut		
February 1	~~#2 Connecticut~~	–	~~#1 Minnesota~~		Connecticut forfeited the game and withdrew from the playoffs.
February 1	#5 Buffalo	1–7	#4 Boston		Game 3

== Playoffs ==
In the original schedule, following the regular season and round-robin, the four teams remaining teams would move on to a single elimination playoff for the Isobel Cup held on February 4 and 5. Due to schedule changes and teams withdrawing, seeding was determined by Toronto's and Minnesota's finish in the end-of-season round-robin after Connecticut withdrew and the winner of the Boston/Buffalo series to face Minnesota and the loser to face Toronto. The playoffs in Lake Placid were postponed on February 3 due to new positive cases of COVID-19.

The league then scheduled the Isobel Cup playoffs to be held at Warrior Ice Arena in Brighton, Massachusetts, for the last weekend in March. Due to the postponement, Connecticut was re-entered into the playoff to face Minnesota, the team they would have faced regardless of seeding had the Whale not withdrawn from Lake Placid before the final game.

Semifinal game March 26
1	Toronto	2
4	Boston	6
2	Minnesota	7
3	Connecticut	0

Isobel Cup Championship; March 27
4	Boston	4
2	Minnesota	3

== Draft ==
The 2020 NWHL Draft resulted in Sammy Davis being selected first overall by the Boston Pride. Additionally, Autumn MacDougall, a skater for the University of Alberta Pandas women's ice hockey program, became the first player in Canada's USports women's ice hockey to be selected in an NWHL Draft.

== Milestones ==
=== Team ===
- On January 23, the Toronto Six expansion team played their first game, a 0–3 loss to the Metropolitan Riveters.
- On January 24, Lindsay Eastwood scored the first goal in Toronto Six history in a shootout loss to the Whitecaps.
- On January 26, the Toronto Six earned their first win in a 2–1 victory over the Boston Pride.
- On January 31, Toronto clinched the top seed in the playoffs by defeating both Minnesota and Connecticut in the revised round-robin tournament to finish the regular season.

=== Players ===
- On January 23:
  - Riveters' goaltender Sonjia Shelly earned her first career shutout.
  - Riveters' forward Kelly Babstock became the fourth player in the league to reach 100 career penalty minutes.
  - Minnesota Whitecaps' captain Winny Brodt-Brown scored her first career NWHL goal.
  - Buffalo Beauts goaltender Carly Jackson made 43 saves in her professional debut, but lost in the shootout to the Connecticut Whale.
- On January 24, Boston Pride captain Jillian Dempsey became the first player in NWHL history to score 100 points with two goals against the Beauts in a 5–1 win.
- On January 26, Amanda Leveille earned her seventh career shutout against the Riveters, passing Brittany Ott to take sole possession of the league's all-time record.
- On February 1, Boston Pride assistant captain Kaleigh Fratkin surpassed Jillian Dempsey in NWHL career assists.
- Toronto Six forward Mikyla Grant-Mentis became the first black player to win the NWHL's Most Valuable Player award. In addition, she won Newcomer of the Year.

== Awards and honors ==
- Mikyla Grant-Mentis, Toronto, 2021 Most Valuable Player
- Kaleigh Fratkin, Boston, 2021 Defender of the Year
- Amanda Leveille, Minnesota, 2021 Goaltender of the Year
- Mikyla Grant-Mentis, Toronto, 2021 Newcomer of the Year
- Saroya Tinker, Metropolitan, 2021 Denna Laing Award

=== NWHL Foundation Award Winners ===
- Boston: Mallory Souliotis
- Buffalo: Carly Jackson
- Connecticut: Grace Kleinbach
- Metropolitan: Saroya Tinker
- Minnesota: Amanda Leveille
- Toronto: Mikyla Grant-Mentis

=== Fans' Three Stars ===
- Mallory Souliotis, Boston Pride
- Carly Jackson, Buffalo Beauts
- Mikyla Grant-Mentis, Toronto Six

== See also ==
- 2020–21 PWHPA season
- 2020–21 SDHL season
