= Brittyn Fleming =

American ice hockey player

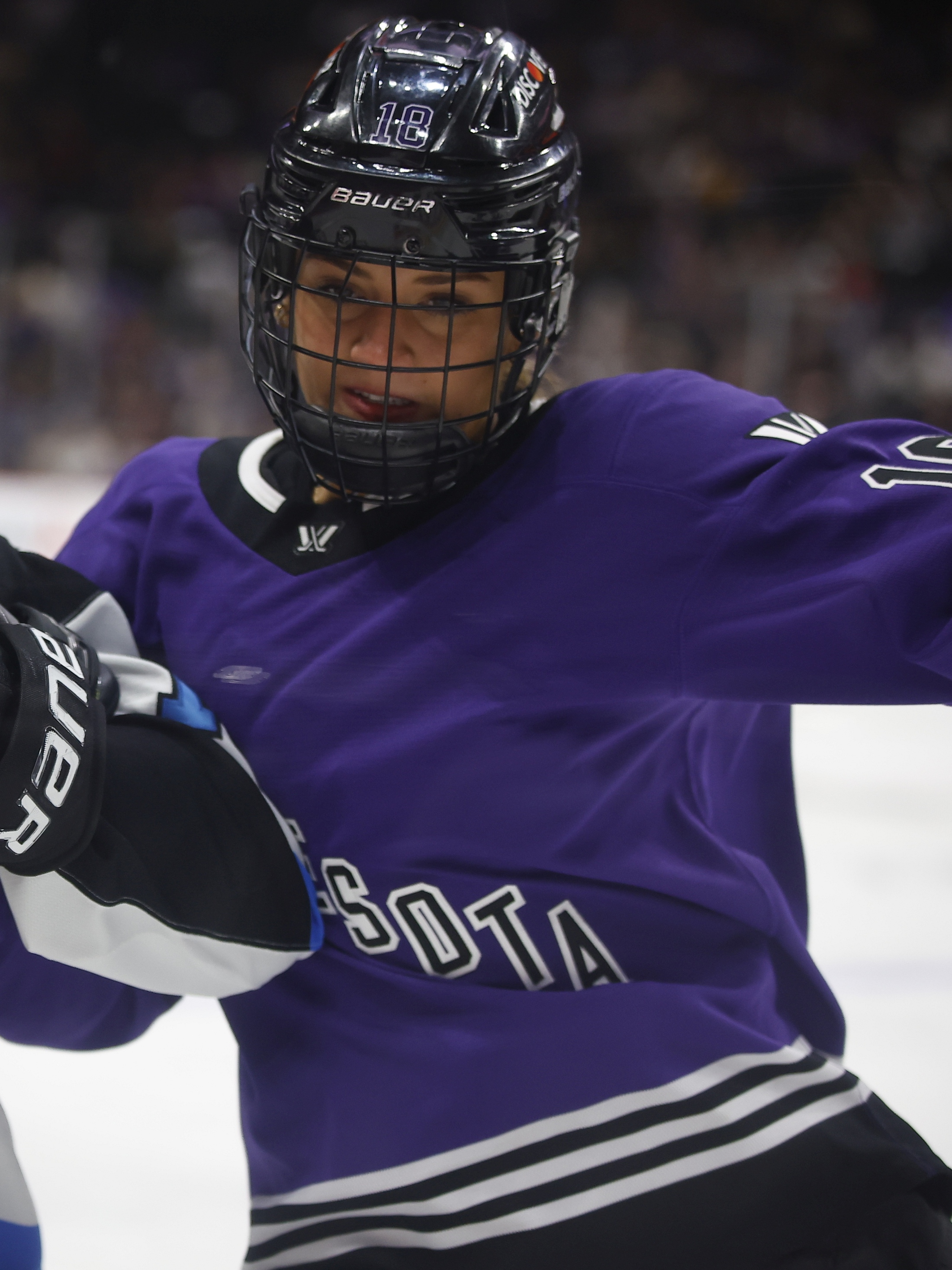
- Fleming with PWHL Minnesota in 2024
- Born: May 24, 1999 (age 27) Oregon, Wisconsin, U.S.
- Height: 5 ft 8 in (173 cm)
- Position: Left wing
- Shot: Left
- Played for: Minnesota Whitecaps; PWHL Minnesota
- National team: United States
- Playing career: 2017–2024

Brittyn Fleming (born May 24, 1999) is an American former professional ice hockey winger. She played in the Premier Hockey Federation (PHF) for the Minnesota Whitecaps and in the Professional Women's Hockey League (PWHL) for PWHL Minnesota.

== Playing career ==
Fleming played youth ice hockey with the Madison Capitols organization, based in Madison, Wisconsin. She played minor ice hockey with the Capitals' under-14 (14U) and 16U teams in the Tier 1 Elite Hockey League (T1EHL), and junior ice hockey with the Madison Capitals 19U AAA (also called 19U Midget Major) team. In the 2016–17 season – her final season of juniors – she led the team in scoring, notching 31 points more than the next highest scorer.

=== College ===
Her college ice hockey career was played with the Minnesota State Mavericks women's ice hockey program in the Western Collegiate Hockey Association (WCHA) conference of the NCAA Division I during 2017 to 2022. She finished as the career points and assists leader for the Mavericks program, as well as having played the most games in school history. During the 2021–22 season, she set the Minnesota State records for points (45) and assists (25) in a season.

=== Professional ===
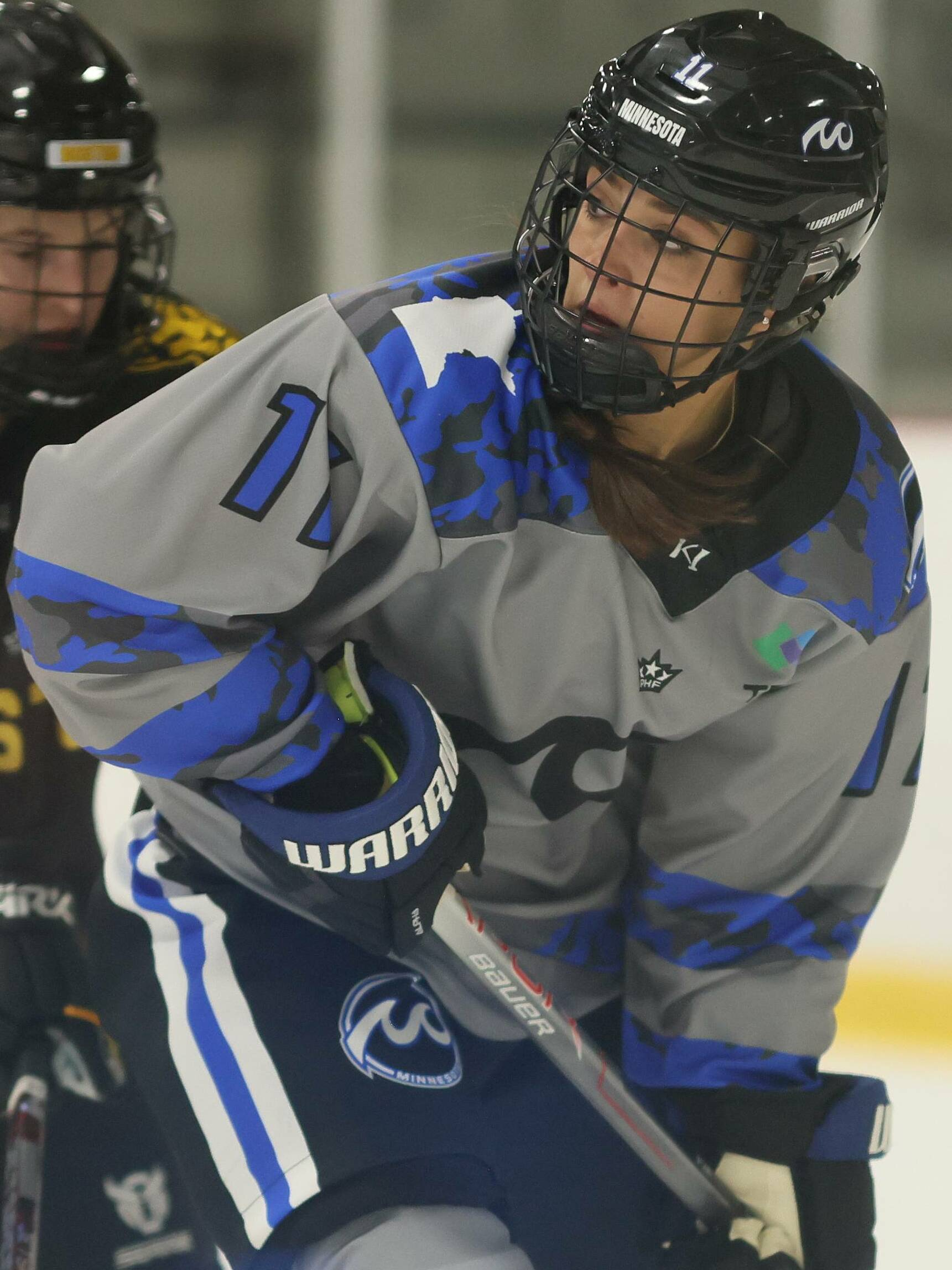
Fleming with the Whitecaps in 2022

==== PHF ====
After graduating, Fleming played her rookie professional ice hockey season with the Minnesota Whitecaps of the PHF during the 2022–23 season. She re-signed with the team for the 2023–24 PHF season in May 2023 but her contract was voided when the league was bought out and dissolved in June 2023.

==== PWHL ====
On December 1, 2023, she signed a one-year contract as a free agent with Minnesota of the PWHL after going undrafted in the 2023 PWHL Draft. On June 7, 2024, Fleming announced her retirement on social media.

== Personal life ==
Fleming attended Oregon High School in her hometown of Oregon, Wisconsin and was a standout player for the school's soccer team.

== Career statistics ==
Note: GP = Games played; G = Goals; A = Assists; Pts = Points; PIM = Penalty minutes;

			Regular season					Playoffs
Season	Team	League	GP	G	A	Pts	PIM	GP	G	A	Pts	PIM
2017–18	Minnesota State Mavericks	WCHA	34	4	15	19	14	—	—	—	—	—
2018–19	Minnesota State Mavericks	WCHA	35	9	11	20	8	—	—	—	—	—
2019–20	Minnesota State Mavericks	WCHA	37	6	12	18	14	—	—	—	—	—
2020–21	Minnesota State Mavericks	WCHA	20	5	7	12	4	—	—	—	—	—
2021–22	Minnesota State Mavericks	WCHA	35	20	25	45	14	—	—	—	—	—
2022–23	Minnesota Whitecaps	PHF	24	3	6	9	2	3	2	0	2	2
2023–24	PWHL Minnesota	PWHL	23	1	1	2	8	9	0	1	1	2
NCAA totals			161	44	70	114	54	—	—	—	—	—
PHF totals			24	3	6	9	2	3	2	0	2	2
PWHL totals			23	1	1	2	8	9	0	1	1	2

== Awards and honors ==
Award	Period
NCAA
WCHA Rookie of the Week	Week of November 14, 2017
WCHA Scholar-Athlete	2018–19
WCHA All-Academic Team	2018–19, 2019–20, 2020–21, 2021–22
Minnesota State Mavericks
Women's Hockey Rookie of the Year	2017–18
Maverick Three-Star Award	2021–22
Women's Hockey MVP	2021–22

== Records ==
Minnesota State Mavericks women's ice hockey program

- Career scoring leader (44G, 70A, 114Pts)
- Career assists leader (70A, 2017–2022)
- Most Assists in a season (25, 2021–22)
- Most Points in a season (45, 2021–22)
- Most Games Played, career (161, 2017–2022)
