= Kayla Friesen =

Canadian-American ice hockey forward

- Born: March 5, 1998 (age 28) Monroe, Louisiana, US
- Height: 5 ft 5 in (165 cm)
- Position: Forward
- Shoots: Left
- PHF team: Free Agent
- Played for: Boston Pride; Connecticut Whale; Clarkson Golden Knights; St. Cloud State Huskies
- National team: Canada
- Playing career: 2016–present

Kayla Friesen is a former Canadian-American ice hockey forward. She most recently played in the 2021–22 season of the now defunct Premier Hockey Federation (PHF) with the Boston Pride. She was selected second overall in the 2020 NWHL Draft by the Connecticut Whale.

== Playing career ==
Friesen attended St. Mary's Academy in Winnipeg, Manitoba for high school and played on the school’s ice hockey team, registering 78 points in 45 games in her senior season.

Friesen’s collegiate ice hockey career began in 2016, when she joined the St. Cloud State Huskies women's ice hockey program of the Western Collegiate Hockey Association (WCHA). She played 103 games in three seasons with the Huskies, notching 16 goals and 50 total points. She served as team captain during her junior year.

Concerns about her development as a player motivated Friesen to transfer to Clarkson University of the ECAC Hockey conference for her final year of university eligibility. Playing on a line with 2020 Patty Kazmaier Award winner Élizabeth Giguère, she put up a career best 30 points in 28 games with the Clarkson Golden Knights. Her stellar performance with the Golden Knights earned recognition as the ECAC Hockey Player of the Week for September 29, 2019, and she was named to the 2020 ECAC Hockey All-Academic team. Across 131 NCAA games, Friesen scored 80 points,

=== NWHL ===
In April 2020, Friesen was selected second overall by the Connecticut Whale in the NWHL Draft. The draft was held via Twitter and top women’s athletes from other North American leagues participated by announcing the picks remotely; Friesen’s pick was announced by WNBA star Jasmine Thomas. She would go on to sign her first professional contract with the Whale ahead of the 2020–21 NWHL season, opting not to pursue overseas opportunities due to the COVID-19 pandemic. having grown up with Whale head coach Colton Orr's nephew in Winnipeg.

She scored her first career NWHL goal in the Whale's opening game of the 2020–21 season, a 2-1 victory over the Buffalo Beauts.

=== International play ===
Medal record

Representing Canada

Women's ice hockey

World U18 Championships
Silver medal – second place	2016 Canada	

Friesen represented Canada at the 2016 IIHF World Women's U18 Championship. She joined a roster filled with up-and-coming hockey stars, including Sophie Shirley, Kristin O'Neill, Daryl Watts, Amy Potomak, Jaime Bourbonnais, and Saroya Tinker, in addition to her future Connecticut Whale teammate, Victoria Howran. She played in all five games, notching an assist against the Czech Republic and scoring a goal against Russia. Her two points contributed to a Canadian silver medal victory in the tournament.

== Personal life ==
Friesen's father, Rob Friesen, played professional ice hockey in North American minor leagues, including with the Wichita Thunder of the Central Hockey League, and overseas in the Netherlands, Germany, and in the United Kingdom with the Guildford Flames.

Friesen was born in Monroe, Louisiana, while her father was playing with the Monroe Moccasins of the Western Professional Hockey League, and has dual Canadian-US citizenship. She has an older sister, Taylor, who played collegiate softball at William Jewell College, and a younger brother, Colton, who plays ice hockey with the New Hampshire Jr. Monarchs of the USPHL’s National Collegiate Development Conference.

== Career statistics ==
			Regular Season					Playoffs
Season	Team	League	GP	G	A	Pts	PIM	GP	G	A	Pts	PIM
2016–17	St. Cloud State Huskies	NCAA	36	7	11	18	22	–	–	–	–	–
2017–18	St. Cloud State Huskies	NCAA	33	4	9	13	8	–	–	–	–	–
2018–19	St. Cloud State Huskies	NCAA	34	5	14	19	24	–	–	–	–	–
2019–20	Clarkson Golden Knights	NCAA	28	10	20	30	41	–	–	–	–	–
2020–21	Connecticut Whale	NWHL	3	1	0	1	4	1	0	0	0	0
2021–22	Boston Pride	PHF	18	3	4	7	10	3	1	0	1	0
NCAA totals			131	26	54	80	95	–	–	–	–	–
PHF totals			21	4	4	8	14	4	1	0	1	0
