= Kennedy Marchment =

Canadian ice hockey player (born 1996)

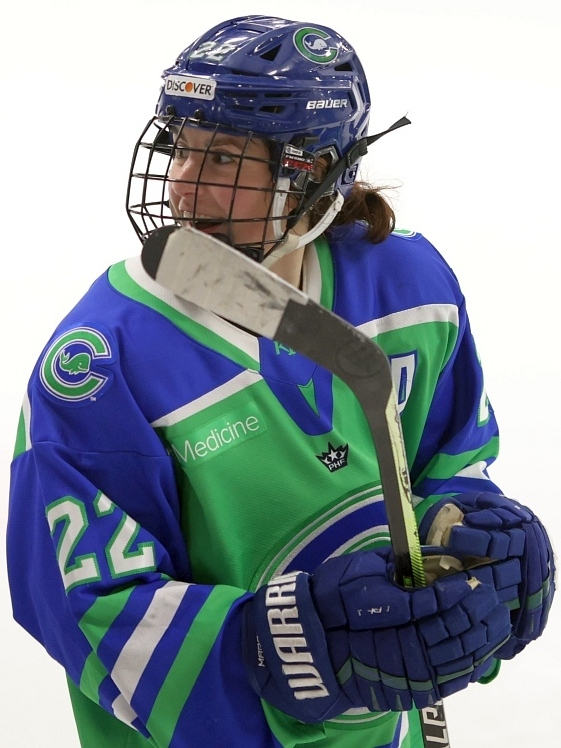
- Marchment with the Connecticut Whale in 2023
- Born: December 6, 1996 (age 29) Courtice, Ontario, Canada
- Height: 5 ft 8 in (173 cm)
- Weight: 154 lb (70 kg; 11 st 0 lb)
- Position: Right wing
- Shoots: Right
- team Former teams: Free agent Montreal Victoire; Connecticut Whale; HV71; Linköping HC; St. Lawrence Saints
- Playing career: 2014–present

Kennedy Marchment (born December 6, 1996) is a Canadian professional ice hockey forward, who most recently played for the Montreal Victoire of the Professional Women's Hockey League (PWHL).

== Playing career ==
Across 142 NCAA games with the St. Lawrence Saints women's ice hockey program, Marchment scored 154 points, being named a top-10 finalist for the 2017 Patty Kazmaier Award.

She was selected 2nd overall by the Buffalo Beauts in the 2017 NWHL Draft.

In 2018–19, her rookie season in the Swedish Women's Hockey League (SDHL), Marchment put up 52 points in 36 games, as her team, Linköping HC Dam, made it to the SDHL finals, where they lost to Luleå HF/MSSK. The next season, she switched teams to play for HV71 and put up 64 points in 36 games, good for second in league scoring. She was named a finalist for the Forward of the Year Award.

Joining the Premier Hockey Federation's Connecticut Whale for the 2021-22 season, Marchment was named the league's most valuable player in her first year with the team. She would rejoin the Whale for the 2022-23 season, which ended up as the PHF's last.

Marchment was drafted in the sixth round of the 2023 PWHL Draft by Montreal. On March 2, 2024, PWHL Montreal announced that she had been placed on long-term injury reserve, with Mélodie Daoust called up from reserves. She would not play another game for Montreal before her contract ended after the 2024-25 season.

=== International ===
Marchment was invited to Team Canada's selection camp for the 2014 IIHF World Women's U18 Championship, but was not selected.

== Personal life ==
Marchment is the niece of former NHL player Bryan Marchment and cousin of San Jose Sharks forward Mason Marchment. On October 13, 2025, she announced her engagement to her former Montreal Victoire teammate Sarah Lefort. She was formerly in a relationship with her former Connecticut Whale teammate Allie Munroe.

== Career statistics ==
			Regular season					Playoffs
Season	Team	League	GP	G	A	Pts	PIM	GP	G	A	Pts	PIM
2011–12	Durham West Jr. Lightning	Prov. WHL	33	15	22	37	6	3	0	2	2	10
2012–13	Durham West Jr. Lightning	Prov. WHL	31	26	20	46	20	7	4	1	5	6
2013–14	Durham West Jr. Lightning	Prov. WHL	37	29	37	66	24	8	6	7	13	8
2014–15	St. Lawrence University	ECAC	36	12	17	29	22	—	—	—	—	—
2015–16	St. Lawrence University	ECAC	36	11	18	29	12	—	—	—	—	—
2016–17	St. Lawrence University	ECAC	36	20	36	56	26	—	—	—	—	—
2017–18	St. Lawrence University	ECAC	34	16	24	40	28	—	—	—	—	—
2018–19	Linköping HC	SDHL	36	25	27	52	12	12	4	5	8	2
2019–20	HV71	SDHL	36	32	32	64	8	4	2	2	4	0
2020–21	HV71	SDHL	34	28	44	72	14	5	7	3	10	2
2021–22	Connecticut Whale	PHF	20	13	20	33	8	2	1	3	4	2
2022–23	Connecticut Whale	PHF	24	17	18	35	6	3	1	2	3	2
2023–24	Montreal Victoire	PWHL	9	1	1	2	0	—	—	—	—	—
PWHL totals			9	1	1	2	0	—	—	—	—	—
