= Maddie Evangelous =

American ice hockey forward (born 1995)

- Born: December 25, 1995 (age 30) Hudson, Massachusetts, United States
- Height: 156 cm (5 ft 1 in)
- Position: Forward
- Shoots: Left
- PHF team Former teams: Connecticut Whale; Elmira College
- Playing career: 2019–present

Maddie Evangelous is an American ice hockey forward, currently playing for the Connecticut Whale in the Premier Hockey Federation (PHF).

== Career ==
Across 112 games with Elmira, Evangelous put up 108 points. In 2016, she was named to the ECAC West All-Rookie Team. She played lacrosse for the college as well as hockey.

In 2019, she signed her first professional contract with the Connecticut Whale. In her first season with the Whale, she scored 1 point in 22 games as the team finished last in the league.

== Personal life ==
Outside of hockey, Evangelous is a nurse.
