= Connecticut Whale =

Connecticut Whale may refer to:

- Connecticut Whale (PHF), a women's ice hockey team
- Connecticut Whale (AHL), a former name of the Hartford Wolf Pack men's ice hockey team
