= 2022–23 PHF season =

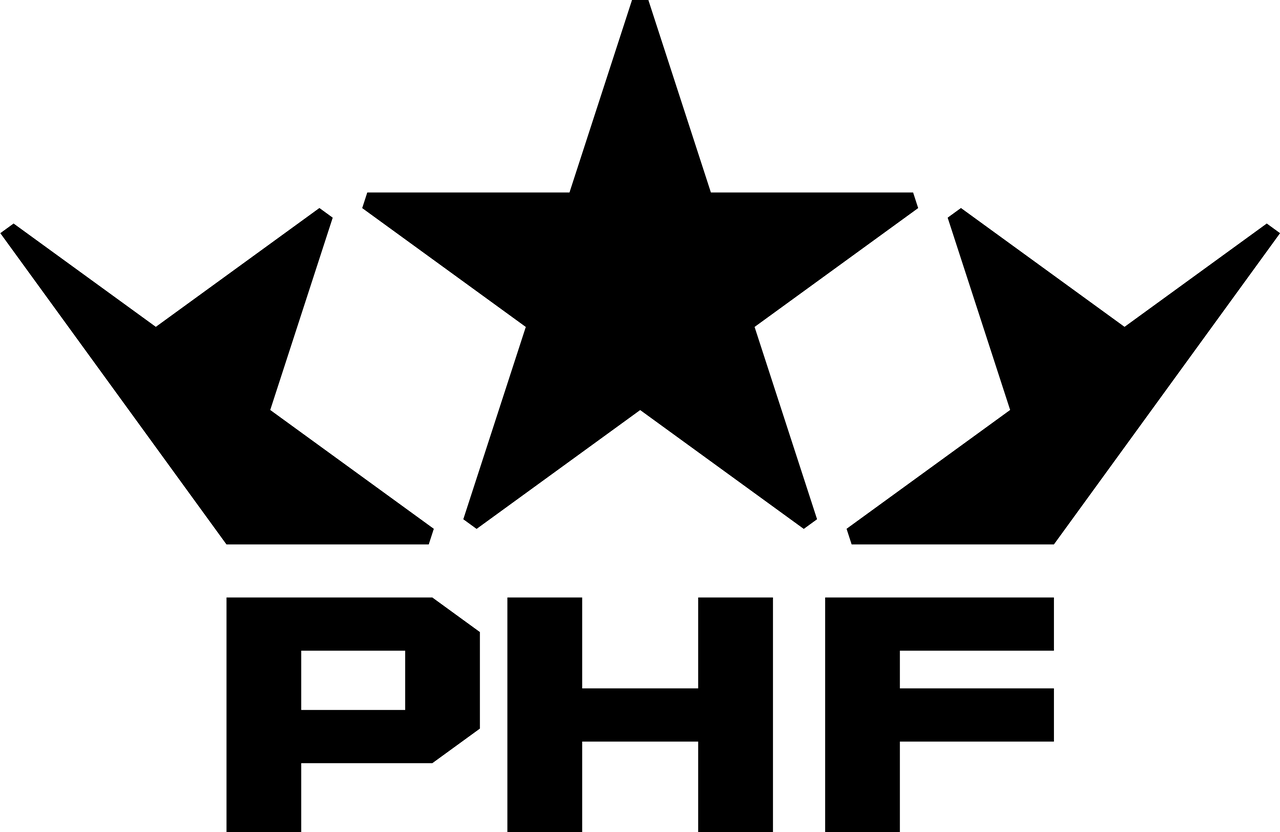
- League: Premier Hockey Federation
- Sport: Ice hockey
- Duration: November 5, 2022 – March 12, 2023
- Games: 84 (24 per team)
- Teams: 7
- TV partner(s): ESPN+, TSN

Regular season
- Season Champions: Boston Pride
- Season MVP: Loren Gabel, Boston
- Top scorer: Loren Gabel, Boston

Playoffs
- Playoffs MVP: Michela Cava, Toronto

Isobel Cup
- Champions: Toronto Six
- Runners-up: Minnesota Whitecaps
- Finals MVP: Tereza Vanišová

Premier Hockey Federation seasons
- 2021–22 2023–24

The 2022–23 PHF season was the eighth and final ice hockey season of the Premier Hockey Federation (PHF) – known as the National Women's Hockey League during its first six seasons (2015–2021).

== League business ==
The PHF decided not to hold a draft this year.

=== Montreal expansion ===
The long-expected Montreal Force expansion franchise was announced in July and the team name, colors and logo were revealed in August. The team will not have an official home arena during the 2022–23 season but will instead play home games across the province of Quebec, with expected stops in Montreal, Gatineau, Quebec City, Rimouski, Rivière-du-Loup, Saint-Jérôme, and Sept-Îles, Quebec, among others.

=== International players ===
A record twenty international players signed as roster players in the PHF for the 2022–23 season. Of the international players, six are from Finland, five are from Czechia, four are from Sweden, two are from Austria, two are from Hungary, and one is from Switzerland. Signed as a practice player rather than to the main roster, Iveta Klimášová of the Buffalo Beauts is from Slovakia.

An additional four players are North American-born but hold multiple citizenship and have represented nations outside of North America in international competition (listed with nations of citizenship): Taylor Baker (Canada/Hungary). Janka Hlinka (Slovakia/United States), Leah Lum (Canada/China), and Lenka Serdar (Czechia/United States).

Player nationalities

- Austria: Antonia Matzka, Janine Weber
- China: Leah Lum
- Czechia: Denisa Křížová, Dominika Lásková, Kateřina Mrázová, Lenka Serdar, Aneta Tejralová, Tereza Vanišová
- Finland: Anna Kilponen, Eveliina Mäkinen, Emma Nuutinen, Meeri Räisänen, Jenna Suokko, Minttu Tuominen
- Hungary: Taylor Baker, Réka Dabasi, Fanni Garát-Gasparics
- Slovakia: Janka Hlinka, Iveta Klimášová
- Sweden: Lovisa Berndtsson, Ebba Berglund, Ronja Mogren, Lovisa Selander
- Switzerland: Sarah Forster

=== Front office changes ===
On May 17, 2022, the Minnesota Whitecaps announced that Jack Brodt, who co-founded the team in 2004, would take a position with NLTT Hockey, the company who bought the Whitecaps in the 2021–22 season.

On August 21, 2022, Chi-Yin Tse was named as the new general manager for the Whitecaps.

=== Coaching changes ===
On May 9, 2022, Venla Hovi succeeded Ivo Mocek as head coach of the Metropolitan Riveters. Mocek remains with the team as associate head coach.

On May 17, 2022, Ronda Engelhardt took over as sole head coach of the Whitecaps.

== Regular season ==
=== Standings ===
Pos	Team	Pld	W	OTW	OTL	L	GF	GA	GD	Pts	
1	Boston Pride	24	15	4	1	4	92	52	+40	54	Playoffs
2	Toronto Six	24	15	2	2	5	87	62	+25	51	Playoffs
3	Connecticut Whale	24	13	1	2	8	83	66	+17	43	Playoffs
4	Minnesota Whitecaps	24	10	0	3	11	58	66	−8	33	Playoffs
5	Metropolitan Riveters	24	8	3	0	13	64	79	−15	30	
6	Montreal Force	24	5	3	2	14	56	70	−14	23	
7	Buffalo Beauts	24	5	0	3	16	50	95	−45	18	

Updated to match(es) played on March 5, 2023. Source: PHF (Note: A win in regulation time is awarded 3 points, 2 points are awarded for an overtime/shootout win, 1 point is awarded for an overtime/shootout loss, 0 points are awarded for a regulation loss) (Note: Tiebreaker order is: points, head-to-head record, regulation wins, wins, goal difference)

=== Schedule ===
The 2022–23 season schedule was published on September 19, 2022.

All times in Eastern Standard Time (UTC−05:00); exception of November 5–6, 2022, which are in Eastern Daylight Time (UTC−04:00).

Regular season
Date	Time	Visitor	Score	Home	OT	Notes	Gamesheet
November 5	2:00	Minnesota	2–3	Toronto	OT		
November 5	7:00	Montreal	5–4	Buffalo	SO		
November 5	7:00	Connecticut	0–4	Boston		Shutout recorded by Corinne Schroeder (1)	
November 6	11:00	Minnesota	2–3	Toronto			
November 6	1:00	Montreal	2–3	Buffalo			
November 6	2:00	Metropolitan	0–2	Boston		Shutout recorded by Corinne Schroeder (2)	
November 18	8:00	Boston	2–0	Minnesota		Shutout recorded by Corinne Schroeder (3)	
November 19	1:00	Toronto	3–6	Metropolitan			
November 19	6:00	Buffalo		Connecticut		Postponed due to inclement weather; rescheduled for January 17	
November 19	7:00	Boston	5–4	Minnesota	OT		
November 20	12:00	Toronto	5–2	Metropolitan			
November 20	12:00	Buffalo		Connecticut		Postponed due to inclement weather; rescheduled for January 18	
November 26	2:00	Metropolitan	3–5	Montreal		Hat-trick recorded by Jade Downie-Landry	
November 26	7:00	Toronto	2–3	Boston	OT		
November 27	2:00	Metropolitan	3–2	Montreal			
November 27	2:00	Toronto	7–3	Boston			
December 3	1:00	Connecticut	3–4	Montreal	SO		
December 3	7:00	Metropolitan	3–4	Minnesota			
December 4	1:00	Connecticut	3–2	Montreal			
December 4	2:00	Metropolitan	1–4	Minnesota			
December 9	7:00	Minnesota	0–2	Connecticut		Shutout recorded by Abbie Ives (1)	
December 10	2:00	Metropolitan	3–2	Toronto	SO		
December 10	2:00	Minnesota	4–3	Connecticut			
December 10	7:00	Boston	3–0	Buffalo		Shutout recorded by Corinne Schroeder (4)	
December 11	1:00	Boston	7–5	Buffalo		Hat-trick recorded by Jillian Dempsey (1)	
December 11	2:00	Metropolitan	2–5	Toronto		Hat-trick recorded by Brittany Howard (1)	
December 16	7:00	Toronto	2–1	Buffalo		Played outdoors at Riverworks in Buffalo	
December 17	2:00	Metropolitan	5–2	Connecticut			
December 17	7:00	Toronto	6–4	Buffalo			
December 17	7:00	Montreal	2–5	Minnesota		Hat-trick recorded by Natalie Snodgrass(1)	
December 18	2:00	Boston	4–6	Connecticut			
December 18	2:00	Montreal	4–1	Minnesota			
January 6	7:00	Boston	5–2	Connecticut			
January 7	3:00	Toronto	3–2	Montreal	SO		
January 7	7:00	Boston	4–1	Metropolitan			
January 7	7:00	Minnesota	4–1	Buffalo			
January 8	1:00	Connecticut	6–0	Metropolitan		Shutout recorded by Meeri Räisänen (1)	
January 8	1:00	Minnesota	5–3	Buffalo			
January 8	2:00	Toronto	3–2	Montreal			
January 14	3:00	Montreal	5–4	Connecticut		Played at UPMC Lemieux Sports Complex in Pittsburgh	
January 14	3:00	Minnesota	3–2	Metropolitan			
January 14	7:00	Buffalo	0–8	Boston		Shutout recorded by Corinne Schroeder (5)	
January 15	2:00	Buffalo	1–2	Boston	OT		
January 15	2:00	Minnesota	4–1	Metropolitan			
January 17	7:00	Buffalo	0–3	Connecticut		Rescheduled from November 19; Shutout recorded by Abbie Ives (2)	
January 18	7:30	Buffalo	3–7	Connecticut		Rescheduled from November 20; Hat-trick recorded by Kennedy Marchment (1)	
January 21	2:00	Connecticut	4–7	Toronto			
January 21	3:00	Boston	5–0	Montreal		Hat-trick recorded by Loren Gabel (1); Shutout recorded by Corinne Schroeder (6)	
January 21	7:00	Metropolitan	1–4	Buffalo			
January 22	1:00	Metropolitan	8–2	Buffalo			
January 22	1:00	Boston	1–2	Montreal	OT		
January 22	2:00	Connecticut	4–1	Toronto			
January 27	7:00	Montreal	1–4	Connecticut			
February 3	7:00	Connecticut	1–2	Metropolitan	SO		
February 4	1:00	Minnesota		Montreal		Postponed due to inclement weather; rescheduled for February 6	
February 4	2:00	Buffalo	0–3	Toronto		Shutout recorded by Elaine Chuli (1)	
February 4	7:00	Metropolitan	0–5	Boston		Shutout recorded by Corinne Schroeder (7)	
February 5	1:00	Minnesota	4–1	Montreal			
February 5	2:00	Buffalo	2–7	Toronto			
February 5	2:00	Connecticut	2–5	Boston			
February 6	1:00	Minnesota	3–2	Montreal		Rescheduled from February 4	
February 11	2:00	Montreal	3–0	Toronto		Shutout recorded by Tricia Deguire (1)	
February 12	2:00	Montreal	1–2	Toronto			
February 18	7:00	Toronto	5–3	Connecticut			
February 18	7:00	Montreal	1–4	Boston			
February 18	7:00	Buffalo	4–2	Minnesota			
February 19	2:00	Toronto	4–6	Connecticut			
February 19	2:00	Buffalo	1–0	Minnesota		Shutout recorded by Samantha Ridgewell (1)	
February 19	3:00	Montreal	1–2	Boston			
February 24	7:00	Boston	2–6	Metropolitan			
February 25	7:00	Toronto	1–0	Minnesota		Shutout recorded by Elaine Chuli (2)	
February 25	7:30	Buffalo	3–1	Montreal			
February 26	1:00	Buffalo	2–6	Montreal			
February 26	1:00	Toronto	7–1	Minnesota			
February 26	3:00	Metropolitan	3–6	Connecticut		Hat-trick recorded by Justine Reyes (1)	
March 3	7:00	Minnesota	4–5	Boston	SO		
March 4	1:00	Minnesota	1–5	Boston			
March 4	7:00	Connecticut	2–1	Buffalo	OT		
March 4	7:00	Montreal	1–2	Metropolitan	OT		
March 5	1:00	Connecticut	4–2	Buffalo			
March 5	2:00	Montreal	3–4	Metropolitan			
March 10	7:00	Buffalo	2–5	Metropolitan			
March 11	2:00	Boston	3–2	Toronto			
March 11	2:00	Buffalo	2–3	Metropolitan			
March 11	7:00	Connecticut	3–0	Minnesota		Shutout recorded by Abbie Ives (3)	
March 12	2:00	Boston	4–5	Toronto			
March 12	2:00	Connecticut	3–1	Minnesota			

=== News and notes ===
- December 10, 2022: Boston Pride goaltender Corinne Schroeder set a new PHF single season record for shutouts, recording her fourth shutout in just seven starts for the first place Pride.
- December 11, 2022: Boston Pride team captain Jillian Dempsey tied a PHF record with six points on Sunday including her first career hat-trick to lead Boston to a 7–5 win versus Buffalo.

=== Player statistics ===
==== Scoring leaders ====
The following players led the league in regular season points at the conclusion of the season on March 12, 2023.

Player	Team	GP	G	A	Pts	PIM
Loren Gabel	Boston Pride	22	20	20	40	4
Kennedy Marchment	Connecticut Whale	24	17	18	35	6
Jillian Dempsey	Boston Pride	24	14	14	28	6
Taylor Girard	Connecticut Whale	24	10	18	28	16
Brittany Howard	Toronto Six	20	16	10	26	10
Shiann Darkangelo	Toronto Six	24	12	13	25	16
Emma Woods	Toronto Six	24	10	13	23	6
Jade Downie-Landry	Montreal Force	24	10	13	23	20
Ann-Sophie Bettez	Montreal Force	23	11	11	22	8
Élizabeth Giguère	Boston Pride	18	6	16	22	4

The following skaters were the top point scorers of teams not represented in the scoring leader table at the conclusion of the season, noted with their overall league scoring rank:

- 11. Madison Packer (F), Metropolitan Riveters: 24 GP, 11 G, 10 A, 21 Pts, 14 PIM
- 14. Mikyla Grant-Mentis (F), Buffalo Beauts: 24 GP, 9 G, 12 A, 21 Pts, 20 PIM
- 15. Natalie Snodgrass (F), Minnesota Whitecaps: 22 GP, 10 G, 10 A, 20 Pts, 4 PIM

==== Leading goaltenders ====
The following goaltenders led the league in regular season save percentage at the conclusion of the season on March 12, 2023, while playing at least one-third of games.

Player	Team	GS	TOI	W	L	SA	GA	SO	SV%	GAA
Corinne Schroeder	Boston Pride	22	1290:15	19	1	797	36	7	.955	1.67
Amanda Leveille	Minnesota Whitecaps	17	1013:	9	6	533	41	0	.923	2.43
Tricia Deguire	Montreal Force	15	902:41	5	9	478	39	1	.918	2.59
Elaine Chuli	Toronto Six	19	1127:	12	5	591	49	2	.919	2.58
Marie-Soleil Deschênes	Montreal Force	9	544:01	3	5	291	25	0	.914	2.76
Katie Burt	Metropolitan Riveters	11	647:	5	5	308	30	0	.903	2.78
Abbie Ives	Connecticut Whale	16	935:	10	6	410	40	3	.896	2.74
Lovisa Berndtsson	Buffalo Beauts	13	714:06	2	8	402	43	0	.893	3.61
Meeri Räisänen	Connecticut Whale	9	515:35	4	2	226	24	1	.894	2.79
Rachel McQuigge	Metropolitan Riveters	8	477:16	4	4	242	27	0	.888	3.39

=== Awards and honors ===
- Most Valuable Player: Loren Gabel (BOS)
- Outstanding Player of the Year: Loren Gabel (BOS)
- Defender of the Year: Kali Flanagan (BOS)
- Goaltender of the Year: Corinne Schroeder (BOS)
- Newcomer of the Year: Loren Gabel (BOS)
- Rookie of the Year: Corinne Schroeder (BOS)
- Denna Laing Award: Lauren Kelly (BOS)

PHF Foundation Award Winners

- Boston: Sammy Davis
- Buffalo: Cassidy MacPherson
- Connecticut: Shannon Turner
- Metropolitan: Reagan Rust
- Minnesota: Denisa Křížová
- Montreal: Laura Jardin
- Toronto: Shiann Darkangelo

Player of the Month

- November 2022: Corinne Schroeder (BOS)
- December 2022: Brittany Howard (TOR)
- January 2023: Kennedy Marchment (CTW)
- February 2023: Loren Gabel (BOS)
- March 2023: Madison Packer (MET)

Three Stars of the Week

- November 5–6: 1. Corinne Schroeder (BOS), 2. Brittany Howard (TOR), 3. Élizabeth Giguère (BOS)
- November 18–20: 1. Sarah Bujold (MET), 2. Corinne Schroeder (BOS), 3. Leah Lum (TOR)
- November 26–27: 1. Jade Downie-Landry (MON), 2. Ann-Sophie Bettez (MON), 3. Fanni Garát-Gasparics (MET)
- December 3–4: 1. Kennedy Marchment (CTW), 2. Minttu Tuominen (MET), 3. Sydney Brodt (MIN)
- December 9–11: 1. Jillian Dempsey (BOS), 2. Loren Gabel (BOS), 3. Brittany Howard (TOR)
- December 16–18: 1. Natalie Snodgrass (MIN), 2. Shiann Darkangelo (TOR), 3. Taylor Girard (CTW)
- January 6–8: 1. Taylor Girard (CTW), 2. Loren Gabel (BOS), 3. Elaine Chuli (TOR)
- January 14–15: 1. Allie Thunstrom (BOS), 2. Ann-Sophie Bettez (MON), 3. Jonna Albers (MIN)
- January 17–22: 1. Loren Gabel (BOS), 2. Kennedy Marchment (CTW), 3. Brittany Howard (TOR)
- February 3–6: 1. Loren Gabel (BOS), 2. Shiann Darkangelo (TOR), 3. Corinne Schroeder (BOS)
- February 11–12: 1. Tricia Deguire (MON), 2. Elaine Chuli (TOR), 3. Alexandra Labelle (MON)
- February 18–19: 1. Corinne Schroeder (BOS), 2. Samantha Ridgewell (BUF), 3. Michela Cava (TOR)
- February 24–26: 1. Madison Packer (MET), 2. Tereza Vanišová (TOR), 3. Justine Reyes (CTW)
- March 3–5: 1. Kennedy Marchment (CTW), 2. Sarah Bujold (MET), 3. Jillian Dempsey (BOS)
- March 10–12: 1. Madison Packer (MET), 2. Daryl Watts (TOR), 3. Abbie Ives (CTW)
- March 16–20: 1. Jonna Albers (MIN), 2. Amanda Leveille (MIN), 3. Michela Cava, (TOR)

== Playoffs ==
The top four teams in the standings qualified for the Isobel Cup playoffs, which were held in two rounds. The first round was a best-of-three series, hosted at Bentley Arena in Waltham, Massachusetts and Mattamy Athletic Centre at Maple Leaf Gardens in Toronto, starting Thursday, March 16, 2023. The two semi-final winners played a one-game championship final on Sunday, March 26, 2023, at Mullett Arena in Tempe, Arizona.

=== Bracket ===
As of March 26, 2023

Semifinals
1	Boston Pride	2	1	–
4	Minnesota Whitecaps	5	4	–
2	Toronto Six	3	3^{OT}	3
3	Connecticut Whale	5	2	0

Finals
Minnesota Whitecaps	3
Toronto Six	4^{OT}

=== Semifinals ===
==== (1) Boston Pride vs. (4) Minnesota Whitecaps ====
March 16, 2023; 7:00 PM	Boston Pride	2–5 (2–2, 0–0, 0–3)	Minnesota Whitecaps	Bentley Arena, Waltham

Game reference

Corinne Schroeder
(30 saves / 33 shots)
Goalies
Amanda Leveille
(30 saves / 32 shots)
Referees:
Amanda Tassoni
Charlotte Hurley
Linesmen:
Chelsea Ward McIntosh
Jennifer Cameron

	0–1	02:56 – Mogren (Wente)
	0–2	14:04 – Albers (Knowles) (SH)
Gilmore (Fratkin, Thunstrom) (PP) – 14:26	1–2
Gabel (Dempsey) – 16:51	2–2
	2–3	51:21 – Albers (Schepers, Morin) (PP)
	2–4	58:41 – Brodt (Křížová, Marshall) (EN)
	2–5	59:23 – Albers (Baldwin) (EN)

Hat trick recorded by Jonna Albers
6 min
Penalties
6 min
32
Shots
36

March 18, 2023; 6:00 PM	Boston Pride	1–4 (1–2, 0–0, 0–2)	Minnesota Whitecaps	Bentley Arena, Waltham

Game reference

Corinne Schroeder
(27 saves / 31 shots)
Goalies
Amanda Leveille
(47 saves / 48 shots)

Wenczkowski (Gilmore, Fratkin) – 06:19	1–0
	1–1	08:05 – Albers (SH)
	1–2	10:56 – Fleming (Křížová, Marshall)
	1–3	43:04 – Morin
	1–4	47:13 – Snodgrass (Schepers, Albers)

4 min
Penalties
6 min
48
Shots
31

Minnesota Whitecaps win series, 2–0

==== (2) Toronto Six vs. (3) Connecticut Whale ====
March 17, 2023; 3:00 PM	Toronto Six	3–5 (1–2, 0–1, 2–2)	Connecticut Whale	Mattamy Athletic Centre, Toronto

Game reference

Elaine Chuli
(28 saves / 32 shots)
Goalies
Abbie Ives
(21 saves / 24 shots)
Referees:
Lacey Senuk
Gillian Allen
Linesmen:
Meghan Mactavish
Ali Beres

	0–1	14:24 – Reyes (Lonergan, Turner) (PP)
	0–2	15:15 – Samoskevich (Mrázová)
Woods (Wilson-Bennett, Vanišová) – 17:35	1–2
	1–3	36:28 – Serdar (Lonergan, Munroe) (PP)
	1–4	40:25 – Girard (Marchment) (SH)
Cava (Howard, Greco) – 41:42	2–4
Cava (Darkangelo) – 46:21	3–4
	3–5	58:42 Girard (Marchment) (EN)

6 min
Penalties
4 min
24
Shots
33

March 18, 2023; 2:00 PM	Toronto Six	3–2 OT (0–1, 2–1, 0–0) (OT: 1–0)	Connecticut Whale	Mattamy Athletic Centre, Toronto

Game reference

Elaine Chuli
(23 saves / 25 shots)
Goalies
Abbie Ives
(26 saves / 29 shots)
Referees:
Amy Martin
Lacey Senuk
Linesmen:
Madison Pendleton
Gillian Allen

	0–1	15:46 – Marchment (Girard)
Howard (Wilson-Bennett, Eastwood) (SH) – 26:21	1–1
	1–2	27:44 – Girard (Turner, Samoskevich) (PP)
Howard (Watts, Lásková) – 28:55	2–2
Woods (Tabin, Darkangelo) – 62:31	3–2

12 min
Penalties
6 min
29
Shots
25

March 20, 2023; 6:00 PM	Toronto Six	3–0 (1–0, 1–0, 1–0)	Connecticut Whale	Mattamy Athletic Centre, Toronto

Game reference

Elaine Chuli
(31 saves / 31 shots)
Goalies
Abbie Ives
(22 saves / 25 shots)
Referees:
Meghan Mactavish
Amy Martin
Linesmen:
Madison Pendleton
Ali Beres

Cava (Tabin, Eastwood) – 05:21	1–0
Lum (Cava, Tabin) – 20:32	2–0
Tabin (Howard, Lásková) (PP) – 49:18	3–0

Shutout recorded by Elaine Chuli
2 min
Penalties
4 min
25
Shots
31

Toronto Six win series, 2–1

=== Isobel Cup final ===
March 26, 2023; 9:00	Toronto Six	4–3 OT (1–0, 1–2, 1–1) (OT: 1–0)	Minnesota Whitecaps	Mullett Arena, Tempe

Game reference

Elaine Chuli
(21 saves / 24 shots)
Goalies
Amanda Leveille
(35 saves / 39 shots)
Referees:
Amanda Tassoni
Lacey Senuk
Linesmen:
Erin Zack
Sarah Buckner

Lásková (Cava, Lum) – 07:22	1–0
	1–1	24:02 – Fleming
Wilson-Bennett (E. Woods) – 30:27	2–1
	2–2	36:06 – Madsen (Snodgrass, Schepers)
	2–3	40:20 – Albers (Snodgrass, Marshall) (PP)
T. Woods (Cava) – 47:56	3–3
Vanišová – 64:23	4–3

4 min
Penalties
2 min
39
Shots
24
