= Rachel McQuigge =

Canadian ice hockey goaltender

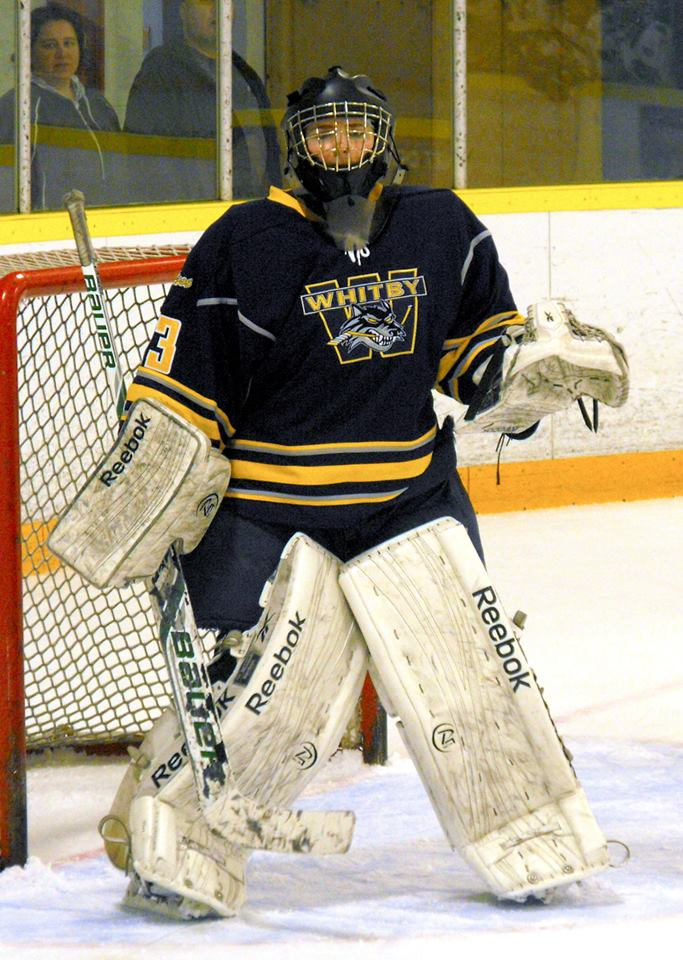
- McQuigge with the Whitby Wolves in 2014
- Born: October 8, 1998 (age 28) Bowmanville, Ontario, Canafa
- Height: 5 ft 9 in (175 cm)
- Position: Goaltender
- Caught: Left
- Played for: PWHL Ottawa; Metropolitan Riveters; Princeton Tigers
- Playing career: 2017–2024

Rachel McQuigge (born October 8, 1998) is a retired Canadian ice hockey goaltender. She most recently played for PWHL Ottawa in the 2023–24 season of the Professional Women's Hockey League (PWHL).

McQuigge's college ice hockey career was played with the Princeton Tigers women's ice hockey program in the ECAC Hockey conference of the NCAA Division I. Following a successful career at Princeton, she signed with the Metropolitan Riveters of the Premier Hockey Federation (PHF) and played in the final PHF season. Following the dissolution of the PHF, she signed with PWHL Ottawa and was one of a small number of goaltenders to participate in the inaugural PWHL season.

== Playing career ==
McQuigge played youth hockey for the Whitby Wolves of the Provincial Women's Hockey League (Prov. WHL) from 2013 to 2017, recording a save percentage above .910 each season and a .930 save percentage in her final two seasons.

Following her youth career, Rachel joined Princeton University's NCAA D1 women’s ice hockey team, where she played from 2017 to 2022. She finished her career ranked second in program history for both career goals against average (GAA) and save percentage, with a 1.81 GAA and .933 S%. She finished eighth in program history with 1,494 saves and her single season record of 801 saves was the fifth highest in program history. She was Princeton’s starting goalie for the Tigers’ historic upset of #1 ranked Harvard University in a three-game series during the 2021–22 season, which marked the first time an eight-seed beat the #1 seed in the ECAC. Her senior season .938 save percentage was second among regular starters in a season in Princeton’s history.

McQuigge was invited to and attended the Hockey Canada national women's goaltender camp in June 2019 and subsequently participated in the selection camp for the Canadian women's national ice hockey development team (also called the national under-22 team) in August 2019.

After graduating from Princeton, McQuigge signed with the Metropolitan Riveters of the PHF. She played four games before being sidelined with an injury for three months of the season. Despite missing over half of the Riveters' games due to injury, McQuigge ultimately earned eight starts and a 4–4–0 record in the 2022–23 season. In early-June 2023, she re-signed with the Riveters for the 2023–24 PHF season.

After the PHF was dissolved to make way for the PWHL in late-June 2023, McQuigge declared for the inaugural PWHL draft, making her eligible to join any team for the 2023–24 season. After going undrafted, she was invited to PWHL Ottawa’s training camp and later signed a one-year contract with the team as a free agent.

== Awards and honours ==
- 2022 All-Ivy League, First Team
- 2022 ECAC All-Academic Team
- 2020 All-Ivy League, Second Team
- 2020 ECAC All-Academic Team
- 2019 All-Ivy League, Honorable Mention
- 2019 ECAC All-Academic Team
- 2018 ECAC All-Academic Team

== Personal life ==
Born in Bowmanville, Ontario, Canada, McQuigge has two younger sisters, Brooke and Kirstyn, and a brother, Daniel. Her sisters are also ice hockey players and both have played their college careers with the Clarkson Golden Knights women's ice hockey program.

While enrolled at Princeton University, McQuigge was a student of the Princeton School of Public and International Affairs.
