= McQuigge =

McQuigge is a surname. Notable people with the surname include:

- Brooke McQuigge (born 2000), Canadian ice hockey player
- Rachel McQuigge (born 1998), Canadian ice hockey player
