= Amanda Conway =

American ice hockey forward

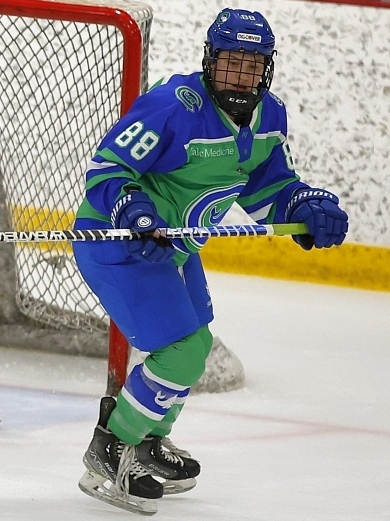
- Conway with the Connecticut Whale in 2023
- Born: 1997 (age 28–29) Methuen, Massachusetts, United States
- Height: 163 cm (5 ft 4 in)
- Position: Forward
- PHF team: Connecticut Whale
- Played for: Norwich University
- Playing career: 2020–present

Amanda Conway is an American ice hockey forward, who played with the Connecticut Whale in the now defunct Premier Hockey Federation (PHF).

== Career ==
Across 111 games with Norwich University, she would score 188 points, the leading NCAA Division III scorer in her final year and third all-time in Division III scorers. In 2017, she had been named New England Hockey Conference Rookie of the Year, would be named NEHC Conference Player of the Year a record three times, and would lead the university to a national title in 2018.

She was drafted 19th overall by the Connecticut Whale in the 2020 NWHL Draft, and would sign her first professional contract with the team ahead of the 2020–21 season.

== Personal life ==
Conway has a degree in psychology. She attended Methuen High School.
