= Loren Gabel =

Canadian ice hockey player (born 1997)

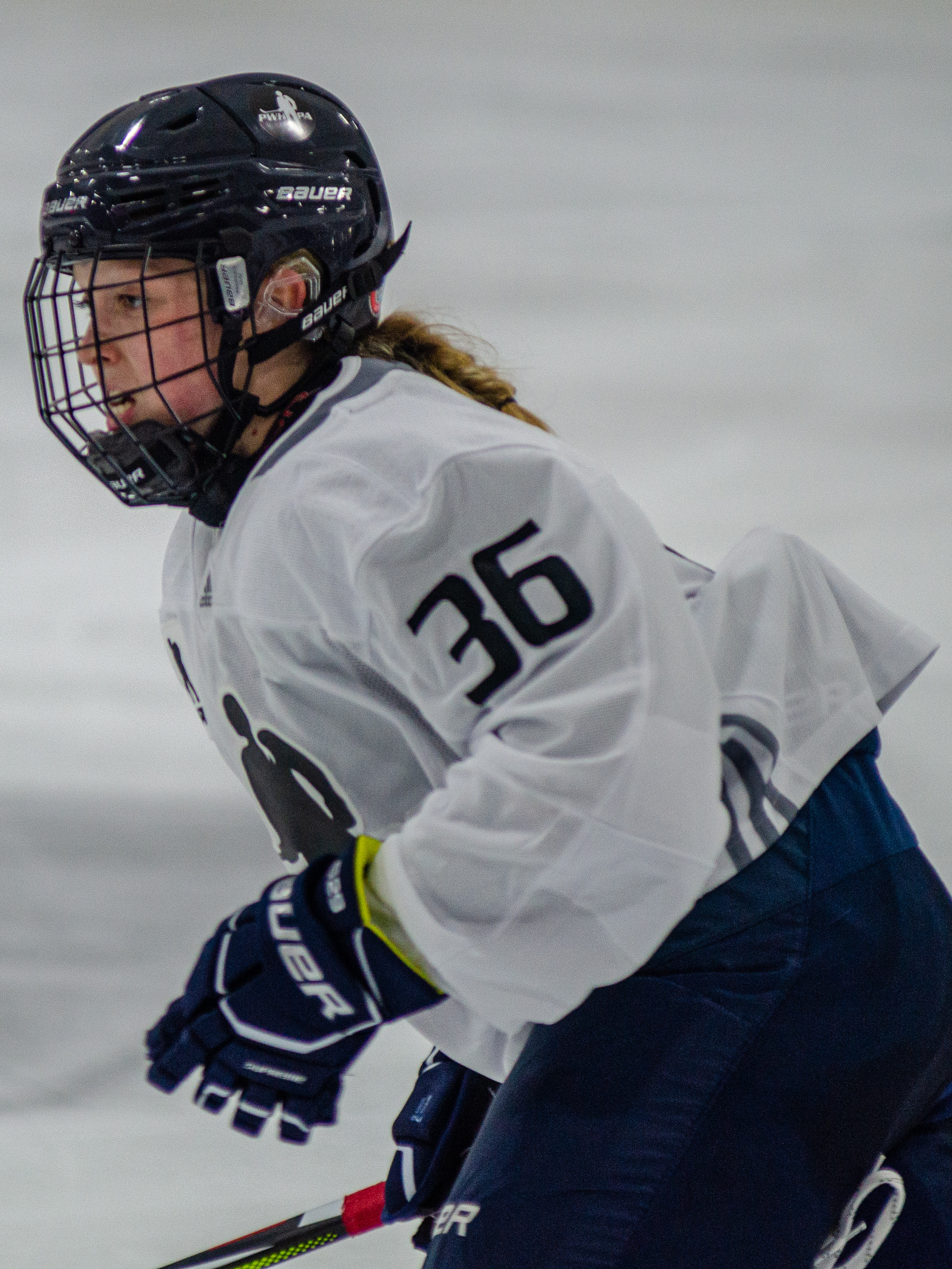
- Gabel in 2019
- Born: July 24, 1997 (age 29) Kitchener, Ontario, Canada
- Height: 5 ft 4 in (163 cm)
- Weight: 141 lb (64 kg; 10 st 1 lb)
- Position: Forward
- Shoots: Left
- PWHL team Former teams: PWHL Boston: Boston Pride (PHF); Clarkson Golden Knights (NCAA)
- National team: Canada
- Playing career: 2015–present
Medal record
World Championships
Bronze medal – third place	2019 Finland

Loren Gabel (born July 24, 1997) is a Canadian professional ice hockey player for the Boston Fleet of the Professional Women's Hockey League (PWHL). She made her debut for the Canada women's national ice hockey team at the 2018 4 Nations Cup, and played for them as well at the 2019 World Championships. She won the Patty Kazmaier Award as a member of the Clarkson Golden Knights in 2019, and was named the Premier Hockey Federation's Most Valuable Player, Outstanding Player of the Year and Newcomer of the Year for the 2022–23 season.

== Playing career ==
=== Provincial Women's Hockey League ===
In her second season of Provincial Women's Hockey League (Prov. WHL) hockey, Gabel captured a silver medal with the Toronto Jr. Aeros at the 2014 Ontario Women's Hockey Association championships (Intermediate AA level). For the 2014–15 Prov. WHL season, Gabel moved on to the Oakville Jr. Hornets, coached by Bradi Cochrane. Logging 37 points in the regular season, which ranked tenth in the Prov. WHL, Gabel gained a bronze medal at the 2015 Prov. WHL championships.

=== NCAA ===
Joining the Clarkson Golden Knights in 2015–16, Gabel captured the team's Rookie of the Year Award, while earning a place on the ECAC Conference All-Rookie Team. Reaching the NCAA Frozen Four, Gabel paced all Golden Knights freshmen in scoring, while ranking second in the NCAA for goals scored by a freshman.

Gabel's sophomore season with the Golden Knights culminated with an NCAA Frozen Four championship, as the Golden Knights defeated the Wisconsin Badgers in the finals. Named to the 2017 ECAC All-Tournament Team, Gabel would also tie for fifth overall nationally in regular season power play goals.

As a Junior (2017–18), Gabel was named a First-Team All-American, while finishing as a Top-3 Finalist for the Patty Kazmaier Award, which was won by Daryl Watts. Also named the ECAC's Top Forward and Player of the Year, Gabel would contribute towards the Golden Knights winning their second straight NCAA Frozen Four tournament. Statistically, her plus/minus ranking of +58 paced all skaters in the NCAA.

In 2018-2019, Gabel was awarded the ECAC Forward Player of the Year and the Player of the Year awards. She became the all-time leading Golden Knight scorer in her senior season, passing the 100 goal and 200 point marks. Fueled by her offensive output, Clarkson again made it to the Frozen Four tournament. Capping off her successful NCAA career, in March 2019 she won the Patty Kazmaier Award, for best player in NCAA women's ice hockey.

=== PHF ===
Following three seasons as a member of the PWHPA, Gabel signed with the Boston Pride of the PHF prior to the 2022-23 season. Her first season with the Pride saw her establish herself as one of the league's best players, as she led the league in points, goals and assists while winning awards for Most Valuable Player, Outstanding Player of the Year and Newcomer of the Year.

=== PWHL ===
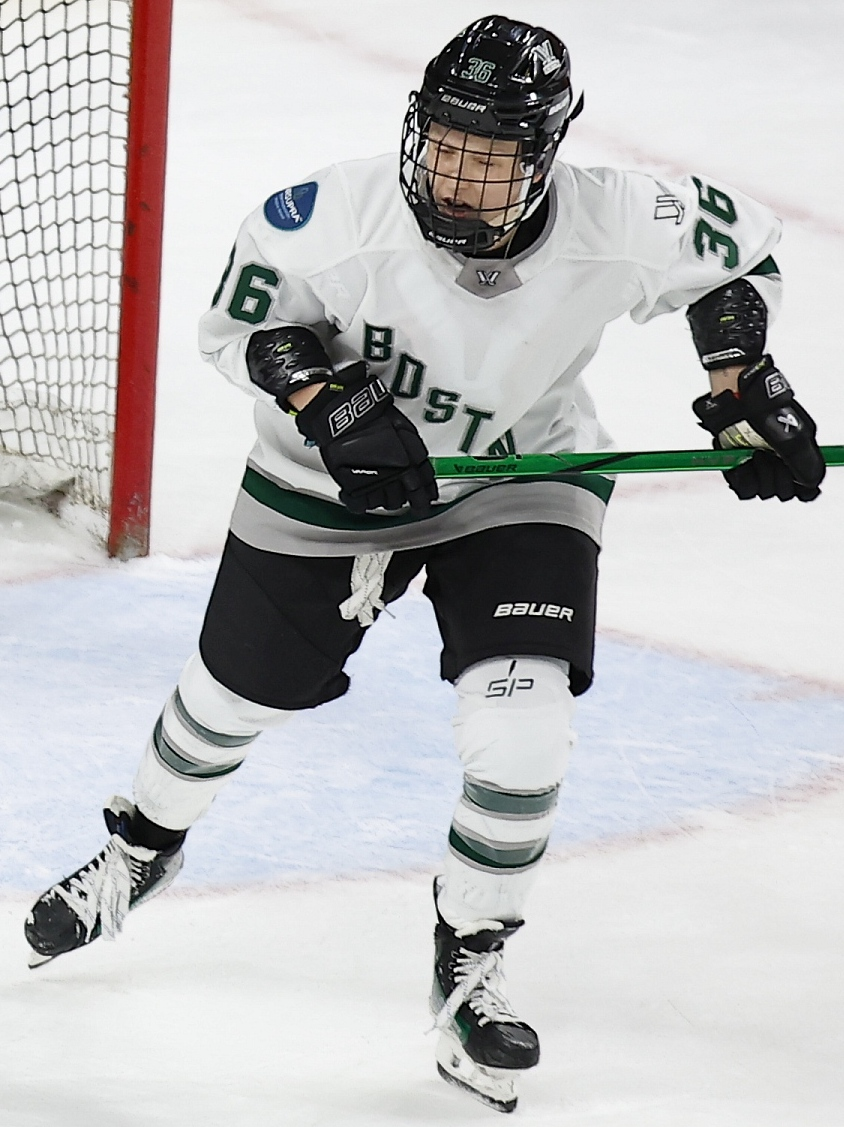
Gabel with PWHL Boston in 2024

Following the folding of the PHF, Gabel was drafted in the fourth round of the 2023 PWHL Draft by PWHL Boston. During the 2023–24 season, in her rookie year, she recorded four goals and three assists in 17 games with Boston. During the 2024–25 season, she recorded two goals and one assist in 20 games for the Fleet. On July 24, 2025, she signed a one-year contract extension with the Fleet. On June 20, 2026, she signed a one-year contract extension with the Fleet.

=== International ===
Gabel competed for Canada's National Women's Under-22/Development Team (NWDT) at the 2018 Nations Cup in Fussen, Germany. Of note, the Canadian contingent attained its worst ever finish, placing fifth. Gabel amassed five points in four games played.

Gabel scored her first career goal for the National Canadian team in the third period of a 2–1 preliminary round loss on November 7, 2018, versus the United States at the 4 Nations Cup.

Gabel was named to the 2019 World Championship team held in Espoo, Finland. Through 7 games she notched 6 goals and 1 assist. In the preliminary game against Finland she had 3 points, 2 goals and 1 assist and was named the MVP of the game. She was also named to the all tournament team.

== Career statistics ==
=== Hockey Canada ===
Year	Event	GP	G	A	Pts	PIM
2016	NWDT vs Sweden	1	1	0	1	1
2017	NWDT vs Japan	2	1	1	2	0
2018	Nations Cup (NWT)	4	4	1	5	0
2019	World Championships (NWT)	7	6	1	7	2
Total		14	12	3	15	3

=== Provincial Women's Hockey League ===
Season	Team	GP	G	A	Pts	PIM
2012–13	Waterloo	39	17	17	34	16
2013–14	Toronto Jr. Aeros	35	14	28	42	28
2014–15	Oakville	28	21	16	37	30
Total		102	52	61	113	74

=== NCAA ===
2018–19 season in progress

Year	GP	G	A	Pts	PIM	PPG	SHG	GWG
2015–16	40	18	8	27	20	3	0	2
2016–17	41	22	20	42	36	6	0	4
2017–18	41	36	39	75	24	7	0	8
2018–19	38	40	29	69	20	2	0	11
Total	160	116	96	213	100	18		25

== Awards and honours ==
- 2015–16: Named to the ECAC Hockey All-Rookie Team ... Named ECAC Hockey Rookie of the Week on 2/23 and selected to the ECAC Hockey Weekly Honor Roll six times ... Named ECAC Hockey Rookie of the Month for February.
- 2016–17: Made the ECAC Hockey Championship All-Tournament Team.
- 2017–18: ECAC Conference Scoring Champion. Top-3 Finalist for the Patty Kazmaier Memorial Award presented annually to the top forward in Division 1 women's hockey. Named ECAC Hockey Player of the Year. Led the country in plus/minus at +58. Named to the 2018 Frozen Four All-Tournament Team. ECAC Hockey Player of the Month (October, December). HCA National Player of the month (January). ECAC Hockey Player of the month (October, December, January). NCAA First Star of the Week (1/23). NCAA Third Star of the Week (1/30). ECAC Hockey Player of the Week six times (10/2, 10/31, 12/12, 1/23, 1/30, 2/26). ECAC Honour Roll four times.
- 2018/2019: The month of October 2018 and January 2019 Gabel was named the ECAC Hockey Player of the month as well as the Women's Hockey Commissioners Association National Division 1 Player of the Month. Named ECAC Hockey Player of the Week three times (10/22, 11/26, 01/28). Loren Gabel was named ECAC Hockey Player of the year, ECAC Hockey First Team All-League, ECAC Best Forward, ECAC Hockey All-Academic Team, and ACHA First Team All-American all while leading the country in goals. She was named the MOP of the ECAC Hockey Championship Tournament. In January 2019 she became the first women's college hockey player to record a goal overseas in an NCAA hockey game vs. Northeastern University. She scored the quickest goal in Clarkson Women's Hockey History being only 8 seconds into the game vs. Yale University on January 18, 2019. Gabel boasted a +51 plus/minus. She completed her senior year at Clarkson University as the all-time leading scorer with 213 points on 116 goals and 97 assists through 160 games as a Golden Knight.
- March 23, 2019 Loren Gabel won the Patty Kazmaier Memorial Award presented annually to the top forward in Division 1 women's hockey.

Awards and achievements
Preceded by Daryl Watts	Patty Kazmaier Award; 2018–19	Succeeded by Élizabeth Giguère
