= Brittany Howard (ice hockey) =

Canadian ice hockey player (born 1995)

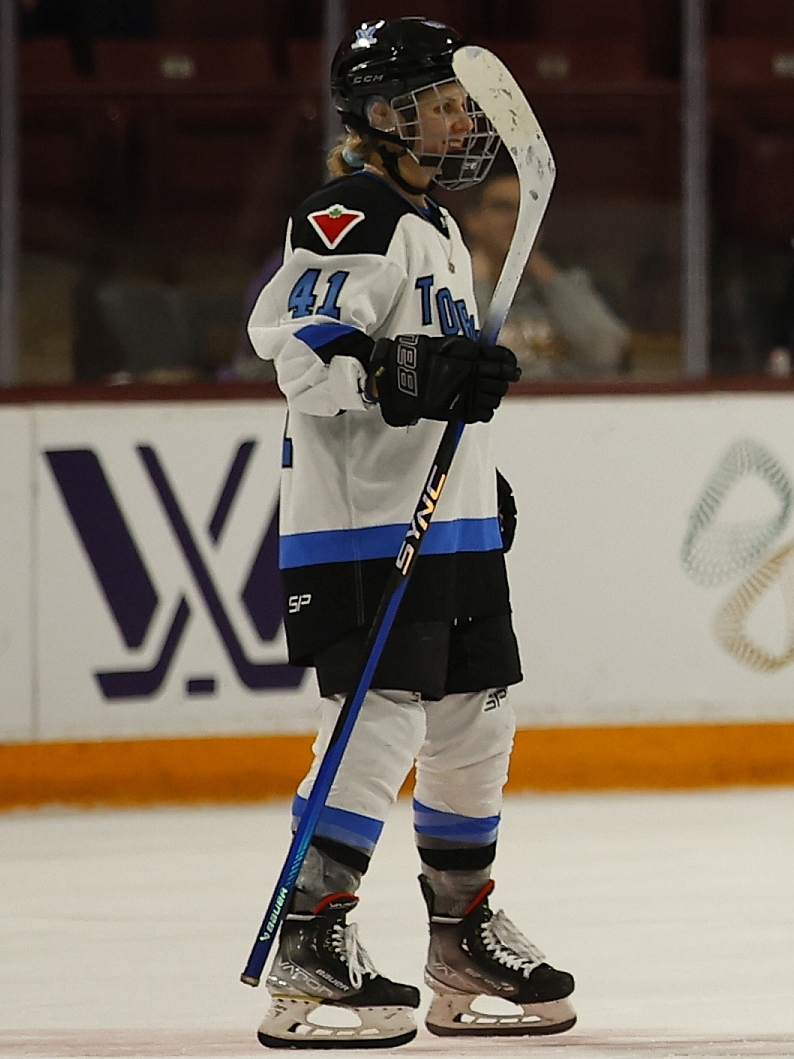
- Howard with PWHL Toronto in 2024
- Born: November 20, 1995 (age 30) St. Thomas, Ontario, Canada
- Height: 5 ft 4 in (163 cm)
- Weight: 135 lb (61 kg; 9 st 9 lb)
- Position: Forward
- Shot: Right
- Played for: PWHL Toronto; Toronto Six; PWHPA Toronto; Toronto Furies; Robert Morris Colonials
- Playing career: 2013–2024

Brittany Howard (born November 20, 1995) is a Canadian former professional ice hockey player. She played one season in the Professional Women's Hockey League (PWHL) for PWHL Toronto. She played college ice hockey at Robert Morris and was the first Colonial player to win the CHA Player of the Year award. Currently, she serves as head coach of the Western Mustangs women's ice hockey program.

== Playing career ==
=== Junior ===
Howard attended Parkside Collegiate Institute in her hometown of St. Thomas, Ontario, where she was named MVP of her basketball team, received the Award of Excellence, and was a three-time honor student. Howard played four seasons of junior hockey in London, Ontario with the London Jr. Devilettes of the Provincial Women's Hockey League. On October 21, 2012, Howard scored seven points to tie the league single-game record in a 7–3 win against the Kitchener-Waterloo Rangers. Howard was an alternate captain and led the Devilettes in scoring in her final season. Along with other Devilettes Jessica Dodds and Tia Kipfer, Howard earned a place at Robert Morris in 2013, joining former Devilettes Anneline Lauziere and Erin Staniewski. All eleven graduating players from the Devilettes 2012–13 squad would move on to play for NCAA or CIS schools.

=== NCAA ===
Howard first played for Robert Morris University in the 2013–14 season. During the 2013–14 season, she made an immediate impact, being named the CHA Player of the month in her first month of play. The addition of Howard was credited with improving the tenth-ranked team's overall offense and making it harder to defend. That season, she led all rookies in the country in assists and points (17G, 24A, 41P). She was named to the USCHO All-Rookie Team (national), the CHA All-Rookie Team and the CHA All-Star Second Team.

Howard played only two games in 2014–15 due to a knee injury. The injury gives her an extra year of NCAA eligibility. The team missed her point total of 41 in 2013–14 which led the team, while in 2014–15 the team leader had 21 points. Howard returned in September 2015 to bolster their offence. In the 2015–16 season, she was a CHA First Team All-Star, leading the conference in points (40). She finished the season being named ASN Women's Player of the Week after back-to-back three-point games and led the team in goals and points.

The 2016–17 season was Howard's best year to date, as she was named the CHA Player of the Year, with multiple Player of the month accolades, on the strength of 20 goals and 30 assists. Her 50 points were the tenth best in the nation, as she was the offensive leader during Robert Morris' first season in which they won the CHA conference championship and played in the NCAA Tournament. Number 8-ranked RMU would lose in the first round to the no. 1-ranked University of Wisconsin. During the season, Howard surpassed Rebecca Vint as the all-time leading scorer for the RMU program.

The NWHL named Howard the top available prospect in the nation. As she committed to completing her senior year at Robert Morris, she was drafted 10th overall by the Buffalo Beauts, the first CHA Conference member to be drafted by the league.

Howard, Jaycee Gebhard and Amber Rennie contributed 42% of RMU's points in 2016-17. With all three returning the next season, Robert Morris was favored to win the CHA again in 2017–18. The Colonials had another strong year, winning the regular season championship. They played Mercyhurst in the CHA championship game, losing by a score of 3-5. Playing as a red-shirt senior, Howard finished the year with 49 point on 25 goals and 24 assists.

=== Professional ===
Howard was drafted in the third round of the 2017 NWHL Draft by the Buffalo Beauts after being named the top prospect in the nation. Rather than sign with the Beauts, she chose to join the Toronto Furies of the Canadian Women's Hockey League (CWHL) and went on to spend three seasons with the Professional Women's Hockey Players Association (PWHPA) following the collapse of the CWHL in 2019. She joined the Toronto Six of the Premier Hockey Federation (PHF) for the 2022-23 season, being named an all-star and leading the team in scoring as the Six would go on to win the Isobel Cup.

She was drafted in the eighth round of the 2023 PWHL Draft by Toronto.

Howard announced her retirement on May 25, 2024.

== Coaching career ==
Howard served as a guest coach at the Pittsburgh Penguins Player Development Camp in July 2025.

On August 13, 2025, Howard was hired as the head coach for the Western Mustangs women's ice hockey program.

== Career statistics ==
=== NCAA ===
Season	GP	G	A	Pts
2013–14 Robert Morris	34	17	24	41
2014–15 Robert Morris	2	0	1	1
2015–16 Robert Morris	36	17	23	40
2016–17 Robert Morris	35	20	30	50
2017–18 Robert Morris	31	25	24	49
Robert Morris totals	138	79	102	181

Source: USCHO.

== Awards and honours ==
- 2014 All-CHA Rookie Team, 2014 All-CHA Second Team, October CHA Player of the Month, November CHA Rookie of the Month
- 2014 USCHO All-Rookie Team
- 2016 All-CHA First Team
- 2017 All-CHA First Team
- 2017 CHA Championship All-tournament team
- 2017 CHA Player of the Year
