= Alison Brewer =

American former ice hockey goaltender

- Born: c. 1982 (age 43–44)
- Education: Brown University; University of Wisconsin
Ice hockey career
- Position: Goaltender
- Played for: Brown University Bears (1996-2000)
- National team: United States

Alison Brewer (c. 1982) is an American former ice hockey goaltender. She was a goaltender for Brown University and was the 2000 winner of the Patty Kazmaier Memorial Award. Brewer was inducted into Brown's Hall of Fame in 2007. She later earned her MBA from the University of Wisconsin and has worked in global marketing since.

== Playing career ==
In the 1999–2000 season, Ali Brewer led the ECAC with a 1.33 goals-against average and compiled a 21-3-3 record. During the season, she was named the ECAC goaltender of the week three times. Brewer was an integral part of Brown qualifying for the 2000 AWCHA national semifinals.

Brewer holds every Brown goaltending record for a season or a career. In her four seasons with the Bears, she posted a 1.37 goals-against average and a .943 save percentage. In addition, she had 2,490 saves and posted 39 shutouts. Numerous records were set by Brewer, including a 0.94 GAA and .957 save percentage in her freshman season, 13 shutouts in her junior season, and 25 wins in her senior campaign. Another record that she holds is five consecutive shutouts, set in her junior season, in which she blanked Cornell (3-0), St. Lawrence University (5-0), Niagara University twice (6-0 both games), and Colby College (9-0).

During Brewer's four seasons, the Bears never won fewer than 20 games in a season. The Bears won ECAC Championships in 1998 and 2000, with Brewer earning MVP honors during the 2000 Championship. The Bears also participated in the AWCHA Tournament three times, from 1998 to 2000, finishing as national runner-up twice.

After spending one year with the US Women's National Team, Brewer worked for four years at Fidelity Investments in Boston. She pursued her education at the University of Wisconsin, Madison School of Business, where she specialized in Marketing and Brand Management. She has made several appearances as a guest analyst on USCHO.com's Game of the Week broadcasts.

== International ==
Brewer was part of the United States Select Team roster that competed at the 1999 Christmas Cup tournament in Füssen, Germany, December 27–30, 1999.

== Awards and honors ==
- 1998 and 2000 ECAC Tournament Most Valuable Player
- Patty Kazmaier Award Finalist, 1999
- Patty Kazmaier Award (2000)
- Academic All-Ivy honors in 1998 and 1999
- Women's Ivy League Outstanding Performers (2000)
- Women's First Team All-Ivy League (1999)
- Women's First Team All-Ivy League (2000)
- Ivy League Player of the Year (2000)
- ECAC Goaltender of the Year (2000)
- First Team All-ECAC (2000)

Awards and achievements
| Preceded by A. J. Mleczko | Patty Kazmaier Award; 1999–2000 | Succeeded by Jennifer Botterill |
