= Allie Munroe =

Canadian ice hockey player (born 1997)

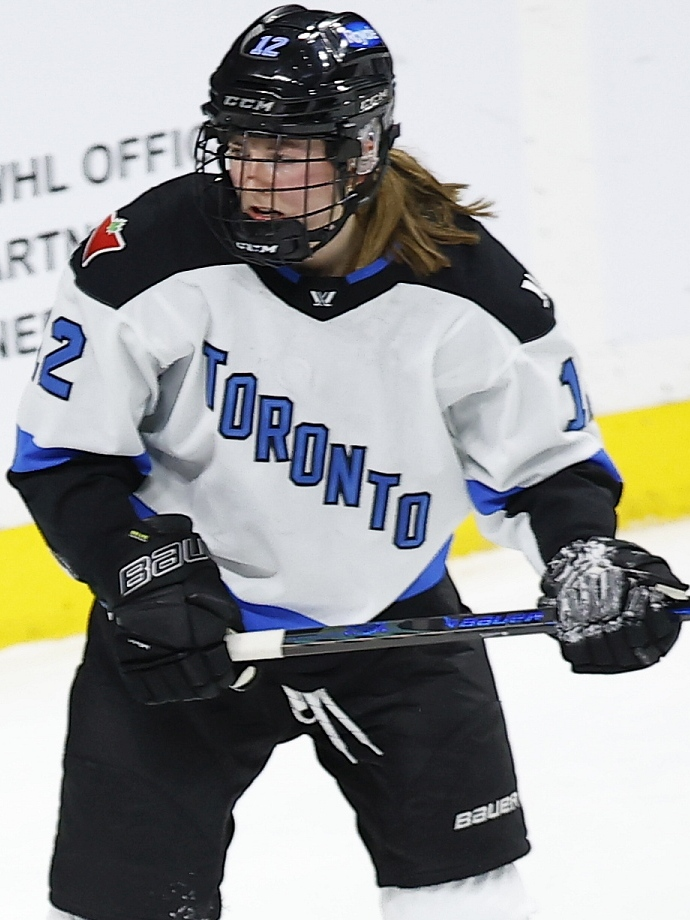
- Munroe with PWHL Toronto in 2024
- Born: April 20, 1997 (age 29) Yarmouth, Nova Scotia, Canada
- Height: 5 ft 8 in (173 cm)
- Weight: 152 lb (69 kg; 10 st 12 lb)
- Position: Defence
- Shoots: Left
- PWHL team Former teams: Toronto Sceptres; Djurgårdens IF; Connecticut Whale
- Playing career: 2015–present

Allie Jean Munroe (born April 20, 1997) is a Canadian professional ice hockey player who is a defender for the Toronto Sceptres of the Professional Women's Hockey League (PWHL). She previously played for the Djurgårdens IF of the Swedish Women's Hockey League (SDHL) and Connecticut Whale of the Premier Hockey Federation (PHF). She played college ice hockey at Syracuse.

== Playing career ==
=== Early career ===
Munroe is the daughter of Linda and Maurice Munro and has two older brothers.. She put on her first pair of skates at the age of five. Her passion for hockey came from watching her older brothers play. She played minor hockey in the Yarmouth County Minor Hockey Association.

From 2010–12, she played for the Western Hurricanes in the Nova Scotia Major Bantam Hockey League (NSMBHL). Due to a lack of girls' hockey teams, she grew up playing on the boys teams until midget division, when she turned her attention to female hockey and joined the New Hampton School.

Munroe captained Team Nova Scotia in the 2015 Canada Winter Games in British Columbia. The team featured future Sceptres teammate Carly Jackson ("CJ") and coach Troy Ryan.

She received a four-year, full athletic scholarship.

=== College ===
Munroe played college ice hockey at Syracuse University. During the 2015–16 season in her freshman year, she recorded four goals and six assists in 36 games. In the CHA Championship game she recorded a goal and an assist in the third period against Mercyhurst Lakers. She was selected to the All-CHA Tournament team.

During her 2016–17 season sophomore year, she recorded seven goals and 14 assists in 34 games. She finished third in points for defensemen in the CHA that season. Following the season, she was named the CHA Best Defenseman and named to the All-CHA First Team, and to the All-Tournament Team for the second consecutive year.

In her junior year, she was named an alternate captain alongside Lindsay Eastwood for the 2017–18 season. She recorded four goals and nine assists in 29 games. Following the season she was named to the All-CHA Second Team.

During the 2018–19 season in her senior year, she recorded five goals and 22 assists in 38 games. She led the team in points (27), assists (22) and blocks (73). She helped co-captain Syracuse to win the 2019 CHA tournament and advance to the NCAA tournament for the first time in program history. Following the season she was named the CHA Best Defenseman and named to the All-CHA First Team, and was named the Syracuse Ice Hockey MVP. She finished her career as Syracuse's all-time leading goal scorer by a defenseman.

=== Professional ===
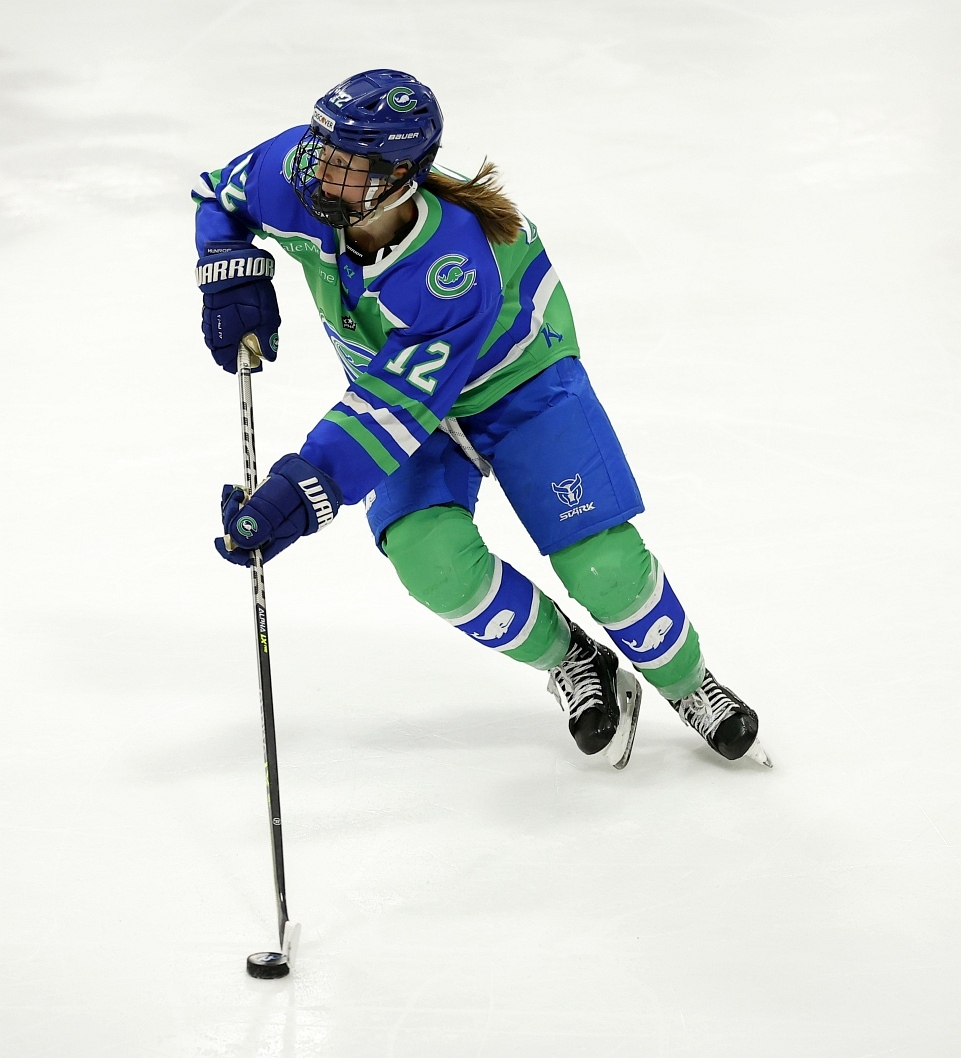
Munroe with the Connecticut Whale in 2023

Munroe began her professional career with Djurgårdens IF of the SDHL. During the 2019–20 season she recorded five goals and four assists in 32 games. During the 2020–21 season she recorded one goal and seven assists in 36 games. On June 3, 2021, she signed with the Connecticut Whale of the PHF.

During the 2021–22 season she recorded three goals and ten assists in 18 games for the Whale. During the 2022–23 season she recorded one goal and 15 assists in 24 games. On May 25, 2022, she signed a two-year contract extension with the Whale.

On September 18, 2023, Munroe was drafted in the ninth round, 50th overall, by PWHL Toronto in the 2023 PWHL Draft. On November 9, 2023, she signed a one-year contract with Toronto. During the 2023–24 season, she recorded one goal and five assists in 24 games. On June 20, 2024, she signed a two-year contract extension with Toronto.

During the 2024–25 season, she recorded one goal and one assist in 30 regular season games. Following the season she was named a PWHL Intact Impact Award winner, which honors one player from each team who best displayed leadership, integrity and commitment to their team. On May 3, 2025, she was named an alternate captain of the Sceptres, a position that had been left vacant after the team traded Jocelyne Larocque on December 30, 2024.

During the 2025–26 season, she faced some injury issues, being placed on LTIR twice for lower-body injuries in the regular season. Her second injury was sustained late in the first period against the Ottawa Charge during the Takeover Tour game in Calgary on April 1, 2026. She would miss the remainder of the season.

On June 20, 2026, Munroe re-signed for two years with the Sceptres.

== International play ==
Munroe was invited to the selection camp with Team Canada for the 2021 IIHF Women's World Championship in Halifax, Nova Scotia. The tournament was cancelled by Nova Scotia Premier Iain Rankin over concerns about the pandemic.

== Personal life ==
She has a Bachelor's degree in Social work from the Falk College of Sport.

She and Jackson served as instructors with the Coastal Female Hockey Development camp in Yarmouth.

Munroe is engaged to her Toronto Sceptres teammate Kali Flanagan. She was formerly involved in a relationship with her former Connecticut Whale teammate Kennedy Marchment.

== Career statistics ==
			Regular season					Playoffs
Season	Team	League	GP	G	A	Pts	PIM	GP	G	A	Pts	PIM
2015–16	Syracuse University	CHA	36	4	6	10	24	—	—	—	—	—
2016–17	Syracuse University	CHA	34	7	14	21	24	—	—	—	—	—
2017–18	Syracuse University	CHA	29	4	9	13	24	—	—	—	—	—
2018–19	Syracuse University	CHA	38	5	22	27	20	—	—	—	—	—
2019–20	Djurgårdens IF	SDHL	32	5	4	9	16	5	0	1	1	2
2020–21	Djurgårdens IF	SDHL	36	1	7	8	22	6	1	1	2	2
2021–22	Connecticut Whale	PHF	18	3	10	13	14	2	0	2	2	0
2022–23	Connecticut Whale	PHF	24	1	15	16	6	3	0	1	1	2
2023–24	PWHL Toronto	PWHL	24	1	5	6	12	5	0	1	1	6
2024–25	Toronto Sceptres	PWHL	30	1	1	2	8	4	1	0	1	2
2025–26	Toronto Sceptres	PWHL	19	0	2	2	12	—	—	—	—	—
SDHL totals			68	6	11	17	38	11	1	2	3	4
PHF totals			42	4	25	29	20	5	0	3	3	2
PWHL totals			73	2	8	10	32	9	1	1	2	8
