= 2020 NWHL Draft =

General information
- Date: April 28–29, 2020
- Location: Online
- Network: Twitter

Overview
- League: National Women's Hockey League
- First selection: Sammy Davis, Boston Pride

The 2020 NWHL Draft took place on April 28–29, 2020. The Boston Pride selected Sammy Davis with the 1st overall pick, having made a trade with the yet unnamed Toronto expansion team. Davis becomes the third Terriers hockey player to go first overall in a professional hockey draft, following Kayla Tutino in the 2016 CWHL Draft, and Rick DiPietro in the 2000 NHL entry draft.

A total of 30 players were drafted, of which 16 are American, 13 are Canadian, and one is Czech. The draft included players who have already finished their college eligibility for the first time.

The draft took place remotely due to the COVID-19 pandemic. Athletes from the WNBA and the National Lacrosse League presented the draft, as well as SC Bern general manager Florence Schelling, UFC contestant Roxanne Modafferi, and former NHL player Pat LaFontaine. That model has been cited as potential inspiration for other leagues in holding virtual drafts.

Autumn MacDougall, who skated for the University of Alberta Pandas women's ice hockey program, became the first player in the history of U Sports women's ice hockey to be selected in the NWHL Draft. Taken with the 14th overall pick, MacDougall was followed by another U Sports skater, as Erin Locke, a forward with the York Lions women's ice hockey, was taken by the Toronto expansion team 15th overall.

== Results ==
=== Rounds 1–2 ===
Round	Pick	Player	Team	Nationality	Former team
1	1	Sammy Davis	Boston Pride (from Toronto)	United States	Boston University Terriers
1	2	Kayla Friesen	Connecticut Whale	Canada	Clarkson University
1	3	Carly Jackson	Buffalo Beauts	Canada	University of Maine
1	4	Saroya Tinker	Metropolitan Riveters	Canada	Yale University
1	5	Alex Woken	Minnesota Whitecaps	United States	University of Minnesota
1	6	Jaycee Gebhard	Toronto Six (from Boston)	Canada	Robert Morris University
2	7	Victoria Howran	Connecticut Whale	Canada	University of New Hampshire
2	8	Amy Curlew	Toronto Six	Canada	Cornell University
2	9	Codie Cross	Buffalo Beauts	Canada	Northeastern University
2	10	Delaney Belinskas	Metropolitan Riveters	United States	Boston College
2	11	Patti Marshall	Minnesota Whitecaps	United States	University of Minnesota
2	12	Tereza Vanišová	Boston Pride	Czech Republic	University of Maine

=== Rounds 3–5 ===
Round	Pick	Player	Team	Nationality	Former team
3	13	Savannah Rennie	Connecticut Whale	Canada	Syracuse University
3	14	Autumn MacDougall	Buffalo Beauts	Canada	University of Alberta
3	15	Erin Locke	Toronto Six	Canada	York University
3	16	Tera Hofmann	Metropolitan Riveters	Canada	Yale University
3	17	Presley Norby	Minnesota Whitecaps	United States	University of Wisconsin
3	18	Taylor Wenczkowski	Boston Pride	United States	University of New Hampshire
4	19	Amanda Conway	Connecticut Whale	United States	Norwich University
4	20	Kelly O'Sullivan	Buffalo Beauts	United States	Adrian College
4	21	Bridgette Prentiss	Metropolitan Riveters	United States	Franklin Pierce University
4	22	Natalie Marcuzzi	Toronto Six	Canada	Robert Morris University
4	23	Haley Mack	Minnesota Whitecaps	United States	Bemidji State University
4	24	Taylor Turnquist	Boston Pride	United States	Clarkson University
5	25	Nicole Guagliardo	Connecticut Whale	United States	Adrian College
5	26	Logan Land	Buffalo Beauts	Canada	Rochester Institute of Technology
5	27	Maddie Bishop	Connecticut Whale	United States	Sacred Heart University
5	28	Maddie Rowe	Minnesota Whitecaps	United States	University of Wisconsin
5	29	Meghara McManus	Boston Pride	United States	University of New Hampshire
5	30	Paige Capistran	Boston Pride (from Toronto)	United States	Northeastern University
