= 2023 PWHL Draft =

Hockey draft

General information
- Date: September 18, 2023
- Location: CBC's Toronto Headquarters; Toronto, Ontario, Canada
- Networks: CBC Gem; CBC Sports App

Overview
- 90 total selections in 15 rounds
- League: Professional Women's Hockey League
- First selection: (United States) Taylor Heise (PWHL Minnesota)

The 2023 PWHL Draft was the first draft in Professional Women's Hockey League history, and took place on September 18, 2023, at the Canadian Broadcasting Centre in Toronto, Ontario.

Minnesota Golden Gophers forward Taylor Heise was the first player chosen in the draft, selected by Minnesota. In all, 90 players were selected over 15 rounds of drafting.

== List of eligible players ==
286 eligible players from 17 different countries declared for the inaugural PWHL draft.

=== Top NCAA/U Sports prospects ===
Source: The Hockey News ranking (September 5, 2023).

Ranking	Player	School
1	(United States) Taylor Heise (F)	Minnesota Golden Gophers
2	(Switzerland) Alina Müller (F)	Northeastern Huskies
3	(Canada) Sophie Jaques (D)	Ohio State Buckeyes
4	(Canada) Emma Maltais (F)	Ohio State Buckeyes
5	(Sweden) Emma Söderberg (G)	Minnesota Duluth Bulldogs
6	(United States) Grace Zumwinkle (F)	Minnesota Golden Gophers
7	(France) Chloé Aurard (F)	Northeastern Huskies
8	(United States) Jesse Compher (F)	Wisconsin Badgers
9	(United States) Gabbie Hughes (F)	Minnesota Duluth Bulldogs
10	(Canada) Ashton Bell (D)	Minnesota Duluth Bulldogs

== Format ==
The draft consisted of 15 rounds. The order of picks in the first round was decided by using a computerized list randomizer during a video conference call with all six teams' general managers. In the second round this order was reversed, so the team with the 6th pick would also receive the 7th pick, whilst the team with first overall pick would not pick again until the 12th pick (last pick in the second round). The order would continue alternating in each subsequent round, producing a 'snaking' order. Draft picks were not allowed to be traded.

The final draft order was:

1. Minnesota
2. Toronto
3. Boston
4. New York
5. Ottawa
6. Montreal

== Selections by round ==
Picks from the 2023 Draft are listed below by round.

=== Round one ===
#	Player	Nationality	PWHL team	College/university/club team
1	Taylor Heise (F)	United States	PWHL Minnesota	Minnesota Golden Gophers (WCHA)
2	Jocelyne Larocque (D)	Canada	PWHL Toronto	Team Adidas (PWHPA)
3	Alina Muller (C)	Switzerland	PWHL Boston	Northeastern Huskies (Hockey East)
4	Ella Shelton (D)	Canada	PWHL New York	Team Scotiabank (PWHPA)
5	Savannah Harmon (D)	United States	PWHL Ottawa	Team Harvey's (PWHPA)
6	Erin Ambrose (D)	Canada	PWHL Montreal	Team Sonnet (PWHPA)

=== Round two ===
#	Player	Nationality	PWHL team	College/university/club team
7	Kristin O'Neill (F)	Canada	Montreal	Team Adidas (PWHPA)
8	Ashton Bell (D)	Canada	Ottawa	Minnesota Duluth Bulldogs (WCHA)
9	Jaime Bourbonnais (D)	Canada	New York	Team Scotiabank (PWHPA)
10	Sophie Jaques (D)	Canada	Boston	Ohio State Buckeyes (WCHA)
11	Emma Maltais (F)	Canada	Toronto	Ohio State Buckeyes (WCHA)
12	Nicole Hensley (G)	United States	Minnesota	Team Sonnet (PWHPA)

=== Round three ===
#	Player	Nationality	PWHL team	College/university/club team
13	Grace Zumwinkle (F)	United States	Minnesota	Minnesota Golden Gophers (WCHA)
14	Kristen Campbell (G)	Canada	Toronto	Team Scotiabank (PWHPA)
15	Jamie Lee Rattray (F)	Canada	Boston	Team Harvey's (PWHPA)
16	Jessie Eldridge (F)	Canada	New York	Team Harvey's (PWHPA)
17	Jincy Roese (D)	United States	Ottawa	Team Adidas (PWHPA)
18	Maureen Murphy (F)	United States	Montreal	Northeastern Huskies (Hockey East)

=== Round four ===
#	Player	Nationality	PWHL team	College/university/club team
19	Dominika Lásková (D)	Czech Republic	Montreal	Toronto Six (PHF)
20	Gabbie Hughes (F)	United States	Ottawa	Minnesota Duluth Bulldogs (WCHA)
21	Chloé Aurard (LW)	France	New York	Northeastern Huskies (Hockey East)
22	Loren Gabel (F)	Canada	Boston	Boston Pride (PHF)
23	Natalie Spooner (F)	Canada	Toronto	Team Scotiabank (PWHPA)
24	Maggie Flaherty (D)	United States	Minnesota	Minnesota Duluth Bulldogs (WCHA)

=== Round five ===
#	Player	Nationality	PWHL team	College/university/club team
25	Susanna Tapani (C)	Finland	Minnesota	Shenzhen KRS Vanke Rays (ZhHL; 2021–22)
26	Jesse Compher (F)	United States	Toronto	Wisconsin Badgers (WCHA)
27	Hannah Brandt (C)	United States	Boston	Team Sonnet (PWHPA)
28	Elizabeth Giguere (RW)	Canada	New York	Boston Pride (PHF)
29	Hayley Scamurra (F)	United States	Ottawa	Team Harvey's (PWHPA)
30	Kati Tabin (D)	Canada	Montreal	Toronto Six (PHF)

=== Round six ===
#	Player	Nationality	PWHL team	College/university/club team
31	Kennedy Marchment (RW)	Canada	Montreal	Connecticut Whale (PHF)
32	Daryl Watts (C)	Canada	Ottawa	Toronto Six (PHF)
33	Corinne Schroeder (G)	Canada	New York	Boston Pride (PHF)
34	Jessica DiGirolamo (D)	Canada	Boston	Team Adidas (PWHPA)
35	Kali Flanagan (D)	United States	Toronto	Boston Pride (PHF)
36	Clair DeGeorge (F)	United States	Minnesota	Team Harvey's (PWHPA)

=== Round seven ===
#	Player	Nationality	PWHL team	College/university/club team
37	Natalie Buchbinder (D)	United States	Minnesota	Wisconsin Badgers (WCHA)
38	Victoria Bach (F)	Canada	Toronto	Team Scotiabank (PWHPA)
39	Theresa Schafzahl (F)	Austria	Boston	Vermont Catamounts (Hockey East)
40	Jill Saulnier (F)	Canada	New York	Team Adidas (PWHPA)
41	Aneta Tejralová (D)	Czech Republic	Ottawa	Boston Pride (PHF)
42	Tereza Vanišová (F)	Czech Republic	Montreal	Toronto Six (PHF)

=== Round eight ===
#	Player	Nationality	PWHL team	College/university/club team
43	Madison Bizal (D)	United States	Montreal	Ohio State Buckeyes (WCHA)
44	Kateřina Mrázová (C)	Czech Republic	Ottawa	Connecticut Whale (PHF)
45	Brooke Hobson (D)	Canada	New York	Modo Hockey Dam (SDHL)
46	Emily Brown (D)	United States	Boston	Team Sonnet (PWHPA)
47	Brittany Howard (F)	Canada	Toronto	Toronto Six (PHF)
48	Denisa Křížová (F)	Czech Republic	Minnesota	Minnesota Whitecaps (PHF)

=== Round nine ===
#	Player	Nationality	PWHL team	College/university/club team
49	Sidney Morin (D)	United States	Minnesota	Minnesota Whitecaps (PHF)
50	Allie Munroe (D)	Canada	Toronto	Connecticut Whale (PHF)
51	Taylor Girard (F)	United States	Boston	Connecticut Whale (PHF)
52	Jade Downie-Landry (F)	Canada	New York	Montreal Force (PHF)
53	Zoe Boyd (D)	Canada	Ottawa	Quinnipiac Bobcats (ECAC)
54	Gabrielle David (C)	Canada	Montreal	Clarkson Golden Knights (ECAC)

=== Round ten ===
#	Player	Nationality	PWHL team	College/university/club team
55	Maude Poulin-Labelle (D)	Canada	Montreal	Northeastern Huskies (Hockey East)
56	Kristin Della Rovere (C)	Canada	Ottawa	Harvard Crimson (ECAC)
57	Paetyn Levis (F)	United States	New York	Ohio State Buckeyes (WCHA)
58	Emma Söderberg (G)	Sweden	Boston	Minnesota Duluth Bulldogs (WCHA)
59	Mellissa Channell (D)	Canada	Toronto	Team Harvey's (PWHPA)
60	Sophia Kunin (F)	United States	Minnesota	Team Harvey's (PWHPA)

=== Round eleven ===
#	Player	Nationality	PWHL team	College/university/club team
61	Amanda Leveille (G)	Canada	Minnesota	Minnesota Whitecaps (PHF)
62	Maggie Connors (F)	Canada	Toronto	Princeton Tigers (ECAC)
63	Sophie Shirley (F)	Canada	Boston	Wisconsin Badgers (WCHA)
64	Abbey Levy (G)	United States	New York	Boston College Eagles (Hockey East)
65	Lexie Adzija (F)	Canada	Ottawa	Quinnipiac Bobcats (ECAC)
66	Jillian Dempsey (F)	United States	Montreal	Boston Pride (PHF)

=== Round twelve ===
#	Player	Nationality	PWHL team	College/university/club team
67	Claire Dalton (C/RW)	Canada	Montreal	Yale Bulldogs (ECAC)
68	Sandra Abstreiter (G)	Germany	Ottawa	Providence Friars (Hockey East)
69	Olivia Zafuto (D)	United States	New York	Boston Pride (PHF)
70	Shiann Darkangelo (LW)	United States	Boston	Toronto Six (PHF)
71	Rebecca Leslie (F)	Canada	Toronto	Team Sonnet (PWHPA)
72	Michela Cava (C)	Canada	Minnesota	Toronto Six (PHF)

=== Round thirteen ===
#	Player	Nationality	PWHL team	College/university/club team
73	Liz Schepers (C/LW)	United States	Minnesota	Minnesota Whitecaps (PHF)
74	Hannah Miller (F)	Canada / China	Toronto	Shenzhen Kunlun Red Star (ZhHL)
75	Emma Buckles (D)	Canada	Boston	Team Sonnet (PWHPA)
76	Kayla Vespa (F)	Canada	New York	Team Adidas (PWHPA)
77	Amanda Boulier (D)	United States	Ottawa	Minnesota Whitecaps (PHF)
78	Elaine Chuli (G)	Canada	Montreal	Toronto Six (PHF)

=== Round fourteen ===
#	Player	Nationality	PWHL team	College/university/club team
79	Ann-Sophie Bettez (F)	Canada	Montreal	Montreal Force (PHF)
80	Caitrin Lonergan (F)	United States	Ottawa	Connecticut Whale (PHF)
81	Emma Woods (F)	Canada	New York	Toronto Six (PHF)
82	Tatum Skaggs (F)	United States	Boston	Team Scotiabank (PWHPA)
83	Alexa Vasko (F)	Canada	Toronto	Team Sonnet (PWHPA)
84	Minttu Tuominen (D)	Finland	Minnesota	Kiekko-Espoo Naiset (NSML)

=== Round fifteen ===
#	Player	Nationality	PWHL team	College/university/club team
85	Sydney Brodt (F)	United States	Minnesota	Minnesota Whitecaps (PHF)
86	Olivia Knowles (D)	Canada	Toronto	Minnesota Whitecaps (PHF)
87	Jess Healey (D)	Canada	Boston	Buffalo Beauts (PHF)
88	Alexandra Labelle (F)	Canada	New York	Montreal Force (PHF)
89	Audrey-Ann Veillette (F)	Canada	Ottawa	Montreal Carabins (RSEQ)
90	Lina Ljungblom (C)	Sweden	Montreal	Modo Hockey Dam (SDHL)

== Draftees based on nationality ==
Rank	Country	Selections	Percent	Top selection
North America		77	85.6%	
1	Canada	49	54.4%	Jocelyne Larocque, 2nd
2	United States	28	31.1%	Taylor Heise, 1st
Europe		13	14.4%	
3	Czechia	5	5.6%	Dominika Lásková, 19th
4	Finland	2	2.2%	Susanna Tapani, 25th
4	Sweden	2	2.2%	Emma Söderberg, 50th
6	Switzerland	1	1.1%	Alina Müller, 3rd
6	France	1	1.1%	Chloé Aurard, 21st
6	Austria	1	1.1%	Theresa Schafzahl, 39th
6	Germany	1	1.1%	Sandra Abstreiter, 68th

=== North American draftees by state/province ===
Rank	State/province	Selections	Percent	Top selection
1	Ontario	27	30.0%	Ella Shelton, 4th
2	Minnesota	11	12.2%	Taylor Heise, 1st
3	Quebec	8	8.9%	Élizabeth Giguère, 28th
4	Manitoba	5	5.6%	Jocelyne Larocque, 2nd
4	New York	5	5.6%	Maureen Murphy, 18th
6	Massachusetts	3	3.3%	Kali Flanagan, 35th
7	Illinois	2	2.2%	Savannah Harmon, 5th
7	Nova Scotia	2	2.2%	Jill Saulnier, 40th
7	Saskatchewan	2	2.2%	Brooke Hobson, 45th
7	Michigan	2	2.2%	Taylor Girard, 51st
7	British Columbia	2	2.2%	Hannah Miller, 74th
12	Colorado	1	1.1%	Nicole Hensley, 12th
12	Missouri	1	1.1%	Jincy Dunne, 17th
12	Alaska	1	1.1%	Clair DeGeorge, 36th
12	Newfoundland and Labrador	1	1.1%	Maggie Connors, 62nd
12	Connecticut	1	1.1%	Amanda Boulier, 77th
12	Wisconsin	1	1.1%	Tatum Skaggs, 82nd
12	Alberta	1	1.1%	Jessica Healey, 87th
