= Abbie Ives =

American ice hockey goaltender

- Born: October 7, 1998 (age 27) Bedford Hills, New York, US
- Height: 5 ft 11 in (180 cm)
- Position: Goaltender
- Caught: Right
- Played for: Connecticut Whale; Quinnipiac Bobcats
- Playing career: 2016–2023

Abbie Ives (born October 7, 1998) is an American ice hockey coach and former goaltender who most recently played with the Connecticut Whale of the Premier Hockey Federation (PHF). She is currently a hockey operations analyst for the Minnesota Wild.

== Playing career ==
Across 102 games with Quinnipiac, Ives would finish with 14 shutouts, third all-time for the university. During her first year with the university, she served as the team's backup behind Sydney Rossman, and would take over the starting position after Rossman's graduation in 2017. In her final season, she would serve as an assistant captain for the team, and would be named the team's MVP.

In May 2020, she signed her first professional contract with Connecticut in the PHF. She picked up her first career professional win in the Whale's opening game of the 2020–21 NWHL season, making 24 saves in a 2–1 victory over the Buffalo Beauts.

== Coaching career ==
On July 12, 2023, Ives joined the staff of the Sacred Heart Pioneers women's hockey team as an assistant coach. On October 8, 2025, she was announced as a hockey operations analyst for the Minnesota Wild.

== Personal life ==
Her father is a Presbyterian minister, and her mother is a pediatric dentist.
