= Daryl Watts =

Canadian ice hockey player (born 1999)

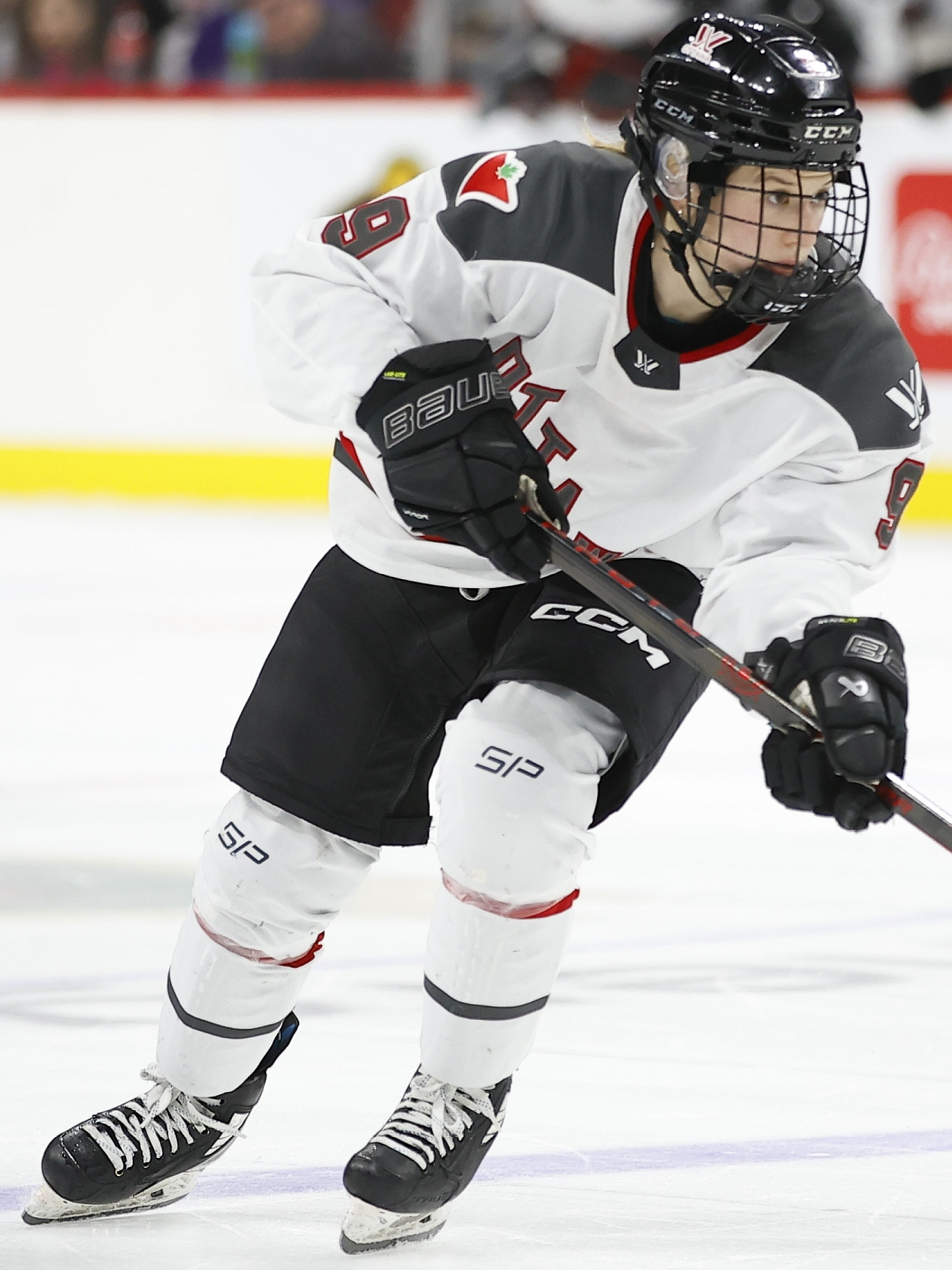
- Watts with PWHL Ottawa in 2024
- Born: May 15, 1999 (age 27) Toronto, Ontario, Canada
- Height: 5 ft 6 in (168 cm)
- Position: Forward
- Shoots: Left
- PWHL team Former teams: Detroit Clutch; Toronto Sceptres; PWHL Ottawa; Toronto Six
- National team: Canada
- Playing career: 2015–present
Medal record
Olympic Games
Silver medal – second place	2026 Milano Cortina	Team
World Championships
Silver medal – second place	2025 Czechia
Silver medal – second place	2026 Denmark
World U18 Championships
Silver medal – second place	2017 Czech Republic

Daryl Watts (born May 15, 1999) is a Canadian ice hockey forward for the Detroit Clutch of the Professional Women's Hockey League (PWHL) and a member of the Canada women's national ice hockey team.

Watts finished her NCAA career as the second-highest scorer of all time and remains the highest-scoring active player to have competed in NCAA women’s hockey. A four-time NCAA All-American (three First Team selections), she was the first freshman ever to win the Patty Kazmaier Award. She also publicly disclosed a US$150,000 salary for the 2023–24 PHF season, which remains the highest publicly disclosed annual salary in professional women’s hockey. In 2021, she was named University of Wisconsin Female Athlete of the Year.

== Playing career ==
=== Hockey Canada ===
Watts was a member of Canada's entry at the 2016 IIHF U18 Women's World Championships in St. Catharine's, Ontario. Her first appearance in a Hockey Canada jersey took place in August 2015 as Canada's National Women's Under-18 Team challenged the United States in a three-game series in Lake Placid, New York.

In the gold medal game of the 2017 IIHF U18 Women's World Championships, contested at PSG Arena in Zlin, Czech Republic, Watts scored a goal for Canada in the third period, their first of the game. Although said goal would tie the game, the US would score twice in the final three minutes, prevailing in a 3–1 final.

=== College career ===
==== Boston College ====
Watts played her first two collegiate seasons at Boston College. During the 2017–18 season, she recorded 42 goals and 40 assists for 82 points in 38 games, leading all of NCAA Division I women’s hockey in scoring. That season, she won the Patty Kazmaier Memorial Award, becoming the first freshman to receive the honour. She was also named NCAA Rookie of the Year, Hockey East Player of the Year, and Hockey East Rookie of the Year.

Watts returned for the 2018–19 season, recording 48 points in 39 games, before entering the NCAA transfer portal.

==== Wisconsin ====
Watts transferred to the University of Wisconsin in 2019. She led the NCAA in scoring during the 2019–20 season and was named WCHA Player of the Year in 2021. That same season, she scored the overtime game-winning goal in the NCAA national championship game.

In recognition of her achievements across all varsity sports, Wisconsin named Watts its Female Athlete of the Year in 2021.

=== Professional career ===
==== Premier Hockey Federation (PHF) ====
In January 2023, Watts signed a two-year contract with the Toronto Six of the Premier Hockey Federation. She joined the team late in the 2022–23 season and won the Isobel Cup championship.

Ahead of the following season, Watts publicly disclosed that her 2023–24 salary would be US$150,000, a figure that received widespread North American media coverage and remains the highest publicly disclosed annual salary in professional women’s hockey.

==== Professional Women’s Hockey League (PWHL) ====
Following the dissolution of the PHF, Watts entered the PWHL and was selected by Ottawa in the league’s inaugural draft. After the 2023–24 season, she became a free agent and signed with the Toronto Sceptres.

While with Toronto, Watts emerged as one of the league’s top offensive players, becoming the second player in PWHL history to reach 50 career points. She was named a PWHL Second Team All-Star in 2025.

During the league's expansion to 12 teams ahead of the 2026–27 season, Watts was left unprotected by the Sceptres and accepted an Expansion Foundational Offer (EFO) with the Detroit Clutch on June 5, 2026. She became the first player signed by the team, and the first player in PWHL history to sign a four-year contract.

== International play ==
Watts represented Canada at the IIHF U18 Women’s World Championship and later earned selection to the senior national team where she won silver in the 2025 IIHF Women's World Championship. In January 2026, she was named to Canada’s roster for the 2026 Winter Olympic Games in Milan.

On February 7, 2026, Watts was one of six Canadian skaters making their Olympic debut as Canada played Switzerland. Defeating Switzerland in a 4-0 final, Watts contributed a multi point effort, recording a goal and assisting on a goal by Sarah Fillier.

In the final game of preliminary round play of Group A, Watts recorded a goal as Canada beat Finland by a 5-0 mark.

In the 2026 Olympic quarterfinals against Germany, Watts had a goal and assist in the match, a 5-1 win. In the match, she assisted on the goal scored by Marie-Philip Poulin, tying Hayley Wickenheiser for most Olympic goals all-time with 18.

In the semifinals of the 2026 Olympics, Watts assisted on a goal by Marie-Philip Poulin in a 2-1 win. Said goal was the 20th of Poulin's Olympic career, setting a scoring record.

Team Canada and Watts took home the silver medal with a loss to long time rival the United States.Watts finished as Canada’s highest scorer with 8 points in 7 games, including 2 goals.

== Career statistics ==
=== Regular season and playoffs ===
			Regular season					Playoffs
Season	Team	League	GP	G	A	Pts	PIM	GP	G	A	Pts	PIM
2013–14	Toronto Jr. Aeros	Prov. WHL	1	0	0	0	0	4	1	0	1	0
2014–15	Toronto Jr. Aeros	Prov. WHL	37	28	20	48	6	13	6	6	12	0
2015–16	Mississauga Jr. Chiefs	Prov. WHL	34	30	35	65	24	11	4	7	11	2
2016–17	Mississauga Jr. Chiefs	Prov. WHL	31	37	15	52	22	13	14	3	17	8
2017–18	Boston College Eagles	WHEA	38	42	40	82	34	—	—	—	—	—
2018–19	Boston College Eagles	WHEA	39	22	26	48	20	—	—	—	—	—
2019–20	Wisconsin Badgers	WCHA	36	25	49	74	4	—	—	—	—	—
2020–21	Wisconsin Badgers	WCHA	21	19	17	36	0	—	—	—	—	—
2021–22	Wisconsin Badgers	WCHA	38	28	29	57	12	—	—	—	—	—
2022–23	Toronto Six	PHF	12	3	4	7	6	4	0	1	1	0
2023–24	PWHL Ottawa	PWHL	24	10	7	17	8	—	—	—	—	—
2024–25	Toronto Sceptres	PWHL	30	12	15	27	12	4	1	1	2	2
2025–26	Toronto Sceptres	PWHL	27	10	9	19	4	—	—	—	—	—
PHF totals			12	3	4	7	6	4	0	1	1	0
PWHL totals			81	32	31	63	24	4	1	1	2	2

=== Hockey Canada ===
Year	Event	GP	G	A	Pts	PIM
2016	National Women's U18 Championships	5	4	4	8	0
2017	IIHF U18 World Championships	5	2	1	3	4
2026	Milano Cortina Olympics	7	2	6	8	2

== Awards and honours ==
- 2018 Boston College Athletics Female Rookie of the Year Award
- 2018 Cammi Granato Award, awarded to Women's Hockey East Player of the Year
- 2018 Hockey East Rookie of the Year
- 2018 Women's Hockey Commissioners Association National Rookie of the Year
- 2017–18 First Team Hockey East
- 2018 Patty Kazmaier Award
- CCM/AHCA 2018–19 Second Team All-American
- CCM/AHCA 2019–20 Second Team All-American
- 2019–20 NCAA scoring champion (74 points)
- 2019–20 Wisconsin Badgers Offensive Player of the Year honors: (tied with Abby Roque).
- 2020–21 NCAA leader: points per game (1.79)
- 2020–21 NCAA leader: goals per game (0.89)
- 2020–21 NCAA leader (tied): goals (17)
- 2020–21 WCHA leader: game-winning goals (4)
- 2020–21 WCHA Player of the Year
- 2021 University of Wisconsin Female Athlete of the Year
- Top-three Finalist: 2021 Patty Kazmaier Award
- CCM/AHCA 2020–21 First Team All-American
- 2020–21 All-USCHO.com First Team
- 2024–25: PWHL Second All-Star Team
- 2026 Olympic Silver Medal

Awards and achievements
Preceded by Ann-Renée Desbiens	Patty Kazmaier Award; 2017–18	Succeeded by Loren Gabel
