= Patty Kazmaier Award =

NCAA award for the outstanding women's ice hockey player

Patty Kazmaier Memorial Award
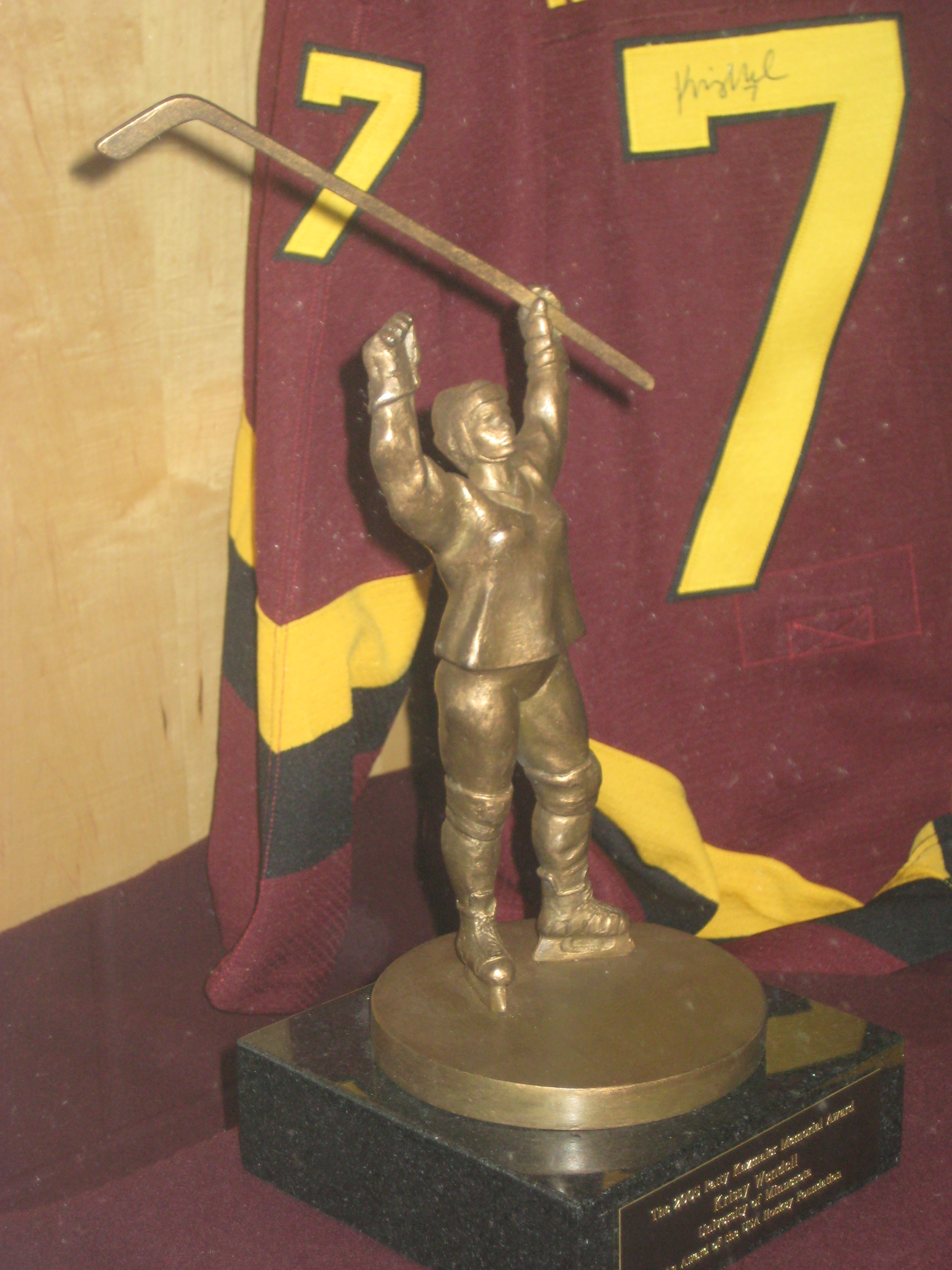
- Sport: Ice hockey
- Awarded for: Top player in NCAA Division I women’s ice hockey.

History
- First award: 1998
- First winner: Brandy Fisher
- Most recent: Caroline Harvey

The Patty Kazmaier Memorial Award is given to the top female college ice hockey player in the United States. The award is presented during the women's annual ice hockey championship, the Frozen Four. The award was first presented in 1998.

The award is named in honor of the late Patty Kazmaier-Sandt, a four-year varsity letter winner and All Ivy League honoree for the Princeton University women's ice hockey team from 1981 through 1986. She also played field hockey and lacrosse. She died on February 15, 1990, at the age of 28 from a rare blood disease. Patty was the daughter of Heisman Trophy winner Dick Kazmaier.

== Award winners ==
Year	Winner	Position	School	Hometown
1998	Brandy Fisher	Forward	New Hampshire	Potsdam, New York
1999	A.J. Mleczko	Forward	Harvard	Nantucket, Massachusetts
2000	Ali Brewer	Goaltender	Brown	Racine, Wisconsin
2001	Jennifer Botterill	Forward	Harvard	Ottawa, Ontario
2002	Brooke Whitney	Forward	Northeastern	Snohomish, Washington
2003	Jennifer Botterill	Forward	Harvard	Ottawa, Ontario
2004	Angela Ruggiero	Defense	Harvard	Panorama City, California
2005	Krissy Wendell	Forward	Minnesota	Brooklyn Park, Minnesota
2006	Sara Bauer	Forward	Wisconsin	St. Catharines, Ontario
2007	Julie Chu	Forward	Harvard	Bridgeport, Connecticut
2008	Sarah Vaillancourt	Forward	Harvard	Sherbrooke, Quebec
2009	Jessie Vetter	Goaltender	Wisconsin	Cottage Grove, Wisconsin
2010	Vicki Bendus	Forward	Mercyhurst	Wasaga Beach, Ontario
2011	Meghan Duggan	Forward	Wisconsin	Danvers, Massachusetts
2012	Brianna Decker	Forward	Wisconsin	Dousman, Wisconsin
2013	Amanda Kessel	Forward	Minnesota	Madison, Wisconsin
2014	Jamie Lee Rattray	Forward	Clarkson	Kanata, Ontario
2015	Alex Carpenter	Forward	Boston College	Cambridge, Massachusetts
2016	Kendall Coyne	Forward	Northeastern	Palos Park, Illinois
2017	Ann-Renée Desbiens	Goaltender	Wisconsin	La Malbaie, Quebec
2018	Daryl Watts	Forward	Boston College	Toronto, Ontario
2019	Loren Gabel	Forward	Clarkson	Kitchener, Ontario
2020	Élizabeth Giguère	Forward	Clarkson	Quebec City, Quebec
2021	Aerin Frankel	Goaltender	Northeastern	Briarcliff Manor, New York
2022	Taylor Heise	Forward	Minnesota	Lake City, Minnesota
2023	Sophie Jaques	Defense	Ohio State	Toronto, Ontario
2024	Izzy Daniel	Forward	Cornell	Minneapolis, Minnesota
2025	Casey O'Brien	Forward	Wisconsin	Milton, Massachusetts
2026	Caroline Harvey	Defense	Wisconsin	Pelham, New Hampshire

=== Winners by school ===
School	Winners
Wisconsin	7
Harvard	6
Northeastern	3
Clarkson	3
Minnesota	3
Boston College	2
Brown	1
Cornell	1
Mercyhurst	1
Ohio State	1
New Hampshire	1

=== Top three finalists by school ===
School	Finalists
Wisconsin	15
Minnesota	13
Harvard	9
Northeastern	8
Minnesota Duluth	7
Clarkson	5
Mercyhurst	5
Boston College	4
New Hampshire	4
Brown	3
Boston University	2
Cornell	2
Dartmouth	2
Ohio State	2
Colgate University	1
North Dakota	1
Penn State	1
Providence	1
St. Lawrence	1

=== Winners by state/province ===
State/Province	Winners
Ontario	8
Wisconsin	4
Massachusetts	4
Minnesota	3
Quebec	3
New York	2
California	1
Connecticut	1
Illinois	1
Washington	1
New Hampshire	1

== Finalists ==
Year	Finalist	School	Finalist	School
1998	Laurie Belliveau	Yale	Sarah Hood	Dartmouth
1999	Ali Brewer	Brown	Nicki Luongo	New Hampshire
2000	Sara DeCosta	Providence	Tara Mounsey	Brown
2000	Sara DeCosta	Providence	Carisa Zaban	New Hampshire
2001	Tammy Shewchuk	Harvard	Courtney Kennedy	Minnesota
2002	Ronda Curtin	Minnesota	Carly Haggard	Dartmouth
2003	Angela Ruggiero	Harvard	Jenny Potter	Minnesota Duluth
2004	Chanda Gunn	Northeastern	Jenny Potter	Minnesota Duluth
2005	Natalie Darwitz	Minnesota	Caroline Ouellette	Minnesota Duluth
2006	Sabrina Harbec	St. Lawrence	Riitta Schaublin	Minnesota Duluth
2007	Meghan Agosta	Mercyhurst	Sara Bauer	Wisconsin
2008	Meghan Agosta	Mercyhurst	Kim Martin	Minnesota Duluth
2009	Meghan Agosta	Mercyhurst	Sarah Vaillancourt	Harvard
2010	Kelly Paton	New Hampshire	Noora Räty	Minnesota
2011	Meghan Agosta	Mercyhurst	Kelli Stack	Boston College
2012	Jocelyne Lamoureux	North Dakota	Florence Schelling	Northeastern
2013	Megan Bozek	Minnesota	Noora Räty	Minnesota
2014	Hannah Brandt	Minnesota	Jillian Saulnier	Cornell
2015	Hannah Brandt	Minnesota	Marie-Philip Poulin	Boston University
2016	Alex Carpenter	Boston College	Ann-Renee Desbiens	Wisconsin
2017	Cayley Mercer	Clarkson	Lara Stalder	Minnesota Duluth
2018	Victoria Bach	Boston University	Loren Gabel	Clarkson
2019	Megan Keller	Boston College	Annie Pankowski	Wisconsin
2020	Alina Müller	Northeastern	Abby Roque	Wisconsin
2021	Grace Zumwinkle	Minnesota	Daryl Watts	Wisconsin
2022	Gabbie Hughes	Minnesota Duluth	Sophie Jaques	Ohio State
2023	Alina Müller	Northeastern	Danielle Serdachny	Colgate
2024	Casey O'Brien	Wisconsin	Kirsten Simms	Wisconsin
2025	Laila Edwards	Wisconsin	Caroline Harvey	Wisconsin
2026	Abbey Murphy	Minnesota	Tessa Janecke	Penn State

== See also ==
- List of sports awards honoring women
- Hobey Baker Award – D-I men's equivalent
- Laura Hurd Award – D-III women's equivalent
- Sid Watson Award – D-III men's equivalent
