= Connecticut Whale (PHF) =

Former women's professional ice hockey team in Simsbury, Connecticut

- City: Simsbury, Connecticut
- League: Premier Hockey Federation
- Founded: 2015
- Folded: 2023
- Home arena: International Skating Center of Connecticut
- Colors: White, blue, green
- Owners: Shared Hockey Enterprises (SHE), LLC
- General manager: Alexis Moed
- Head coach: Colton Orr
- Captain: Shannon Turner

The Connecticut Whale were a professional ice hockey team in the Premier Hockey Federation (PHF). They played in Simsbury, Connecticut, at the International Skating Center of Connecticut. The team was established in 2015 as one of the four charter franchises of the National Women's Hockey League (NWHL), which became the PHF in 2021. Their name and colors paid homage to the Hartford Whalers, a former NHL and WHA franchise based in Connecticut. The team folded along with the PHF in 2023 as part of the creation of a new, unified women's league, the Professional Women's Hockey League (PWHL).

== History ==
For their first season, the Whale played home games in Stamford, Connecticut at Chelsea Piers. Chris Ardito was hired as the first general manager in franchise history, while Jake Mastel and Lisa Giovanelli coached the team. The team is the second professional hockey team to bear the Connecticut Whale name, following the American Hockey League team previously and currently known as the Hartford Wolf Pack.

Among their off-season acquisitions, the Whale signed Kaleigh Fratkin to a contract on July 1, 2015. She was the first Canadian player to sign a contract in the NWHL.

The team made its debut in the 2015–16 season. Jessica Koizumi was named first team captain in franchise history. The first game in NWHL history was a sell out on October 11, 2015, between the New York Riveters and Connecticut Whale. The Whale prevailed by a 4–1 tally as Jessica Koizumi scored the first goal in both franchise and NWHL history. In the same game, Kelli Stack had one goal and two assists, becoming the first player to record a multi-point performance. Whale goaltender Jaimie Leonoff was credited the win, capturing the game's First Star. Stack was recognized as the Second Star, and Kelly Babstock, who became the first Canadian-born player to score a goal in an NWHL regular season game, was acknowledged as the Third Star.

The Whale won their first three games in franchise history with three different goalies. In the first game, the Whale prevailed with Jaimie Leonoff, while former Quinnipiac goaltender Chelsea Laden captured the second win, and Nicole Stock played her first game in over five years to capture the third win on the road against the New York Riveters.

Prior to the team's second season, the Whale moved to the Northford Ice Pavilion in Northford, Connecticut. This lasted one season as the Whale moved to the Terry Conners Ice Rink at Cove Island Park in Stamford, Connecticut, for the 2017–18 season.

On August 20, 2018, the Whale named active player Cydney Roesler an assistant coach for the 2018–19 season making her the first player-coach in franchise history.

After two seasons at Terry Conners Ice Rink, the Whale moved again to the larger Danbury Ice Arena in Danbury, Connecticut. Former NHL enforcer Colton Orr was named as head coach for the 2019–20 season. The team was eliminated in the semifinal game by the Boston Pride, the eventual league titlist, prior to the championship being cancelled by the COVID-19 pandemic.

The following season was then delayed amidst the capacity and travel restrictions during the pandemic. The 2020–21 season eventually started on January 23, 2021, with the entire season to be played at Herb Brooks Arena in Lake Placid, New York, without fans in attendance and teams kept in isolation. However, the Metropolitan Riveters were forced to withdraw from the two-week season on January 28 after several members of the organization tested positive for COVID-19. The schedule was then adjusted to have the top three teams at the time play a round-robin tournament to determine playoff seeding with the Whale as the second seed. Connecticut then lost to the expansion Toronto Six 0–6 on January 31. The next day, the team forfeited their final game to the Minnesota Whitecaps and withdrew from the playoffs citing concerns with increased positive cases within the bubble and protecting their players from the virus. Two days later, the league suspended the season before the playoffs could commence due to several more positive tests throughout the league. The league then rescheduled the playoffs to be held at Warrior Ice Arena in Brighton, Massachusetts, with the Whale re-entered as the third seed to face the Minnesota Whitecaps, who they would have faced regardless of the outcome of the game the Whale withdrew from in Lake Placid, in a semifinal game. The Whale then lost to the Whitecaps 7–0 in the semifinal game.

On May 10, 2021, the league announced it had sold the Whale to a new independent ownership group called Shared Hockey Enterprises (SHE), LLC, led by Tobin Kelly, reducing the league operated teams to three.

On June 29, 2023, it was announced that the PHF and its assets had been purchased as part of a bid to create a new, unified women's professional league. The league and its teams were dissolved in the process and a new league, the Professional Women's Hockey League, was slated to begin play in 2024. While Simsbury was not granted one of the six charter PWHL franchises, the New York franchise announced in November that it would host the majority of its home games at Total Mortgage Arena in Bridgeport, Connecticut. PWHL New York hosted its first game in Bridgeport on January 5, 2024.

== Season-by-season records ==
Note: GP = Games played, W = Wins, L = Losses, OTL = Overtime losses, SOL = Shootout losses, Pts = Points, GF = Goals for, GA = Goals against

Season	GP	W	L	OTL	SOL	Pts (Note: Starting with the 2021–22 season, 3 points are awarded for a regulation win, 2 points are awarded for an overtime/shootout win, 1 point is awarded for an overtime/shootout loss, 0 points are awarded for a regulation loss)	GF	GA	Playoffs	Home arena
2015–16	18	13	5	0	0	26	61	51	Lost Isobel Cup Semifinal series to Buffalo Beauts	Chelsea Piers
2016–17	18	5	12	1	0	11	60	77	Lost Isobel Cup Semifinal to Boston Pride	Northford Ice Pavilion
2017–18	16	3	11	2	0	8	26	55	Lost Isobel Cup Semifinal to Metropolitan Riveters	Terry Connors Ice Rink
2018–19	16	2	12	2	0	6	22	64	Lost play-in game to Metropolitan Riveters	Terry Connors Ice Rink
2019–20	24	2	20	2	0	6	39	100	Lost Isobel Cup Semifinal to Boston Pride	Danbury Ice Arena
2020–21	4	2	2	0	0	4	9	12	Lost Isobel Cup Semifinal to Minnesota Whitecaps	Herb Brooks Arena
2021–22	20	15	3	2	0	47	74	44	Lost Isobel Cup Final to Boston Pride	Danbury Ice Arena
2022–23	24	14	8	2	0	43	83	66	Lost Isobel Cup Semifinal to Toronto Six	International Skating Center of Connecticut
PHF Totals	140	56	73	11	0	151	374	469		

== Team ==
=== 2022–23 roster ===
As of November 3, 2022

No.	Nat	Player	Pos	S/G	Age	Acquired	Birthplace
18	(United States)	Hannah Bates	D	R	27	2021	Trenton, Michigan
	(United States)	Kacey Bellamy	D	L	39	2023	Providence, Rhode Island
88	(United States)	Amanda Conway	F	R	28	2020	Methuen, Massachusetts
	(United States)	Kendall Cornine	F	R	29	2023	Livingston, New Jersey
17	(United States)	Taylor Girard	F	L	28	2021	Macomb, Michigan
27	(Slovakia)	Janka Hlinka	F	L	30	2021	Stratford, Connecticut
5	(Canada)	Tori Howran	D	L	28	2020	Bancroft, Ontario
35	(United States)	Abbie Ives	G	R	27	2020	Bedford Hills, New York
22	(Canada)	Kennedy Marchment (A)	F	R	29	2021	Courtice, Ontario
12	(United States)	Allie Munroe	D	L	29	2021	Yarmouth, Nova Scotia
	(Canada)	Maude Poulin-Labelle	D	L	26	2023	Sherbrooke, Quebec
14	(United States)	Justine Reyes	F	R	29	2022	Chino Hills, California
81	(Finland)	Meeri Räisänen	G	L	36	2022	Tampere, Finland
11	(United States)	Melissa Samoskevich	F	L	29	2020	Sandy Hook, Connecticut
47	(Czech Republic)	Lenka Serdar	F	L	29	2022	Lexington, Massachusetts
	(Sweden)	Emma Söderberg	G	L	34	2023	Örnsköldsvik, Sweden
74	(United States)	Mallory Souliotis	D	L	30	2022	Acton, Massachusetts
9	(United States)	Tori Sullivan	F	R	30	2022	West Bloomfield, Michigan
15	(United States)	Emma Vlasic (A)	F	L	29	2019	Wilmette, Illinois
24	(Austria)	Janine Weber (A)	F	L	35	2019	Innsbruck, Austria
8	(United States)	Alyssa Wohlfeiler (A)	F	R	37	2020	Saugus, California

Coaching staff and team personnel

- Head coach: Colton Orr
- Assistant coach: Jeff Devenney
- Assistant coach: Sue Merz
- Consulting coach: Jack Han
- Athletic trainer: Hailey Rock

=== Team captains ===
- Jessica Koizumi, 2015–16
- Molly Engstrom, 2016
- Kelli Stack, 2017
- Sam Faber, 2017–18
- Emily Fluke, 2018–19
- Shannon Turner, 2019–2023

=== Head coaches ===
- Jake Mastel, 2015
- Heather Linstad, 2015–2017
- Ryan Equale, 2018–2019
- Colton Orr, 2019–2023

=== General managers ===
- Chris Ardito, 2015–2016
- Lisa Giovanelli, 2016–2017
- Bray Ketchum, 2019–2020
- Amy Scheer, 2020–21
- Alexis Moed, 2021–2023

== Draft history ==
Hannah Brandt from the Minnesota Golden Gophers women's ice hockey program became the first player in franchise history to be selected in the inaugural 2015 NWHL Draft. Michelle Picard was the first defenseman selected in NWHL Draft history.

=== 2015 NWHL draft ===
The following were the Whale's selections in the 2015 NWHL Draft on June 20, 2015.

Pick #	Nat	Player	Pos	College
2	(United States)	Hannah Brandt	F	University of Minnesota (Golden Gophers)
6	(United States)	Michelle Picard	D	Harvard University (Crimson)
10	(United States)	Milica McMillen	D	University of Minnesota (Golden Gophers)
14	(United States)	Maryanne Menefee	F	University of Minnesota (Golden Gophers)
18	(Canada)	Cassandra Poudrier	D	Cornell University (Big Red)

=== 2016 NWHL draft ===
The following were the Whale's selections in the 2016 NWHL Draft on June 18, 2016.

Pick #	Nat	Player	Pos	College
3	(United States)	Dani Cameranesi	F	University of Minnesota (Golden Gophers)
7	(United States)	Andie Anastos	F	Boston College (Eagles)
11	(Canada)	Melissa Channell	D	University of Wisconsin (Badgers)
15	(United States)	Paige Savage	F	Northeastern University (Huskies)
19	(United States)	Sydney Rossman	G	Quinnipiac University (Bobcats)

=== 2017 NWHL draft ===
The following were the Whale's selections in the 2017 NWHL Draft on August 17, 2017.

Pick #	Nat	Player	Pos	College
5	(United States)	Sam Donovan	F	Brown University (Bears)
9	(Canada)	Eden Murray	F	Yale University (Bulldogs)
13	(Czech Republic)	Denisa Křížová	F	Northeastern University (Huskies)
17	(United States)	Nina Rodgers	F	Boston University (Terriers)

=== 2018 NWHL draft ===
The following were the Whale's selections in the 2018 NWHL Draft on December 19 and 20, 2018.

Pick #	Nat	Player	Pos	College
2	(United States)	Melissa Samoskevich	F	Quinnipiac University (Bobcats)
7	(United States)	Makenna Newkirk	F	Boston College (Eagles)
12	(Canada)	Katelyn Rae	F	Merrimack College (Warriors)
17	(United States)	Dominique Kremer	D	Merrimack College (Warriors)
22	(United States)	Maggie LaGue	D	Robert Morris University (Colonials)

=== 2020 NWHL draft ===
The following were the Whale's selections in the 2020 NWHL Draft on April 28 and 29, 2020. Connecticut held the Metropolitan Riveters fifth round pick (27th overall), as the future considerations from the trade of Maria Sorokina to the Riveters in 2019.

Pick #	Nat	Player	Pos	College
2	(Canada)	Kayla Friesen	F	Clarkson University (Golden Knights)
7	(Canada)	Victoria Howran	D	University of New Hampshire (Wildcats)
13	(Canada)	Savannah Rennie	F	Syracuse University (Orange)
19	(United States)	Amanda Conway	F	Norwich University (Cadets)
25	(United States)	Nicole Guagliardo	F	Adrian College (Bulldogs)
27	(United States)	Maddie Bishop	F	Sacred Heart University (Pioneers)

=== 2021 NWHL draft ===
The following were the Whale's selections in the 2021 NWHL Draft on June 29, 2021.

Pick #	Nat	Player	Pos	College
1	(United States)	Taylor Girard	F	Quinnipiac University (Bobcats)
8	(United States)	Emma Polaski	F	Syracuse University (Orange)
20	(United States)	Hannah Bates	D	St. Cloud State University (Huskies)
26	(United States)	Grace Middleton	F	University of New Hampshire (Wildcats)

== Franchise milestones and statistics leaders ==
As of the 2023-23 season:

Milestone	Player	Notes
First goal	Jessica Koizumi	October 11, 2015
First multi-point game	Kelli Stack	October 11, 2015
First win	Jaimie Leonoff	October 11, 2015
Most points	Kennedy Marchment	62 points (27G, 35A)
Most goals	Kennedy Marchment	27 goals
Most assists	Shannon Turner	42 assists
Most points per game	Kennedy Marchment	1.55 PPG
Most PIM	Shannon Turner	120 PIM
Most Games Played	Shannon Turner	128 GP

== Awards and honors ==
- Grace Kleinbach, 2021 Foundation Award
