= 2023–24 PHF season =

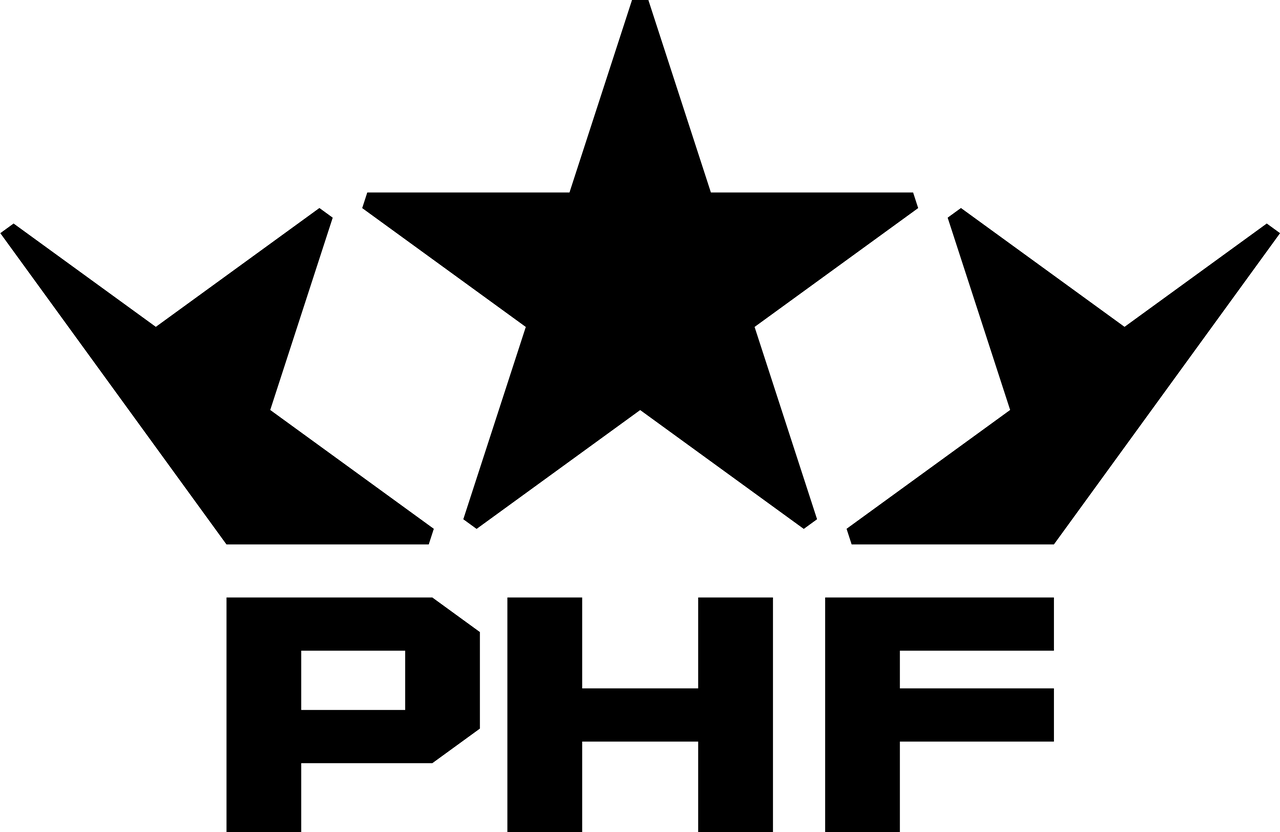
- League: Premier Hockey Federation
- Sport: Ice hockey
- Duration
- TV partner(s): ESPN+, TSN

Regular season

Playoffs

Isobel Cup

Premier Hockey Federation seasons
- 2022–23

The 2024 PHF season was to be the ninth ice hockey season of the Premier Hockey Federation (PHF) – known as the National Women's Hockey League during its first six seasons (2015–2021).

== League business ==
The PHF elected not to hold a draft in 2023.

On June 30, 2023, the Premier Hockey Federation announced a sale of the league to the Mark Walter Group. This sale changed the landscape in North American women's professional hockey, as it united the players from the Professional Women's Hockey Players Association and the PHF into a single league. The new league year will start in January 2024.

=== International players ===
At the time of league buy out, the number of international player signings that had been announced for the 2023–24 PHF season had already matched the record 22 signings set in the previous season. Of the international players, five were from Finland, four were from Czechia, three were from Sweden, two were from Japan, and one player each was signed from Austria, Denmark, France, Germany, Hungary, and Switzerland.

An additional three were North American-born players who had represented nations outside of North America in international competition: Canadian-born Taylor Baker, a member of the Hungarian national team; US-born Janka Hlinka, a member of the Slovak national team; and Canadian-born Leah Lum, who represented China at the 2022 Winter Olympics.

==== Player nationalities ====
- Austria: Theresa Schafzahl (MTL)
- China: Leah Lum (TOR)
- Czechia: Kateřina Mrázová (MET), Noemi Neubauerová (MET), Aneta Tejralová (BOS), Tereza Vanišová (TOR)
- Denmark: Amalie Andersen (BUF)
- France: Chloé Aurard (BOS)
- Finland: Anna Kilponen (MET), Emma Nuutinen (BUF), Noora Räty (MET), Susanna Tapani (MET), Minttu Tuominen (MET)
- Germany: Sandra Abstreiter (CTW)
- Hungary: Taylor Baker (MTL), Fanni Garát-Gasparics (MET)
- Japan: Akane Shiga (BUF), Aoi Shiga (BUF)
- Slovakia: Janka Hlinka
- Switzerland: Alina Müller (BOS)
- Sweden: Lovisa Berndtsson (BOS), Ronja Mogren (MIN), Emma Söderberg (CTW)
