= List of Montreal Victoire draft picks =

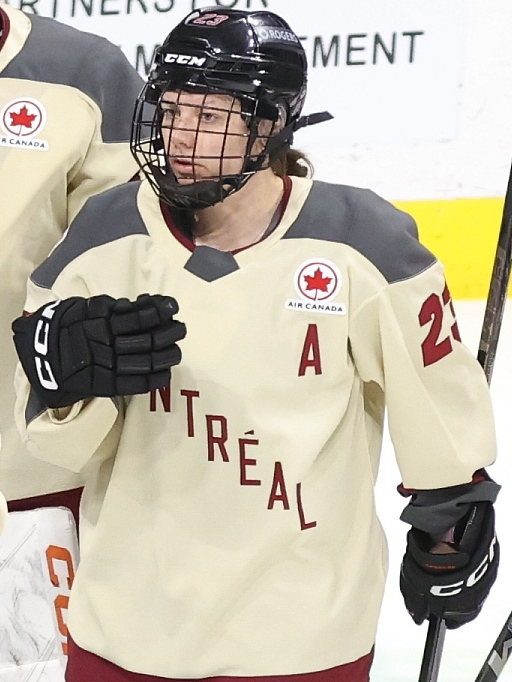
Erin Ambrose was the first ever draft selection for Montreal, taken sixth overall in 2023.

The Montreal Victoire are a professional ice hockey team in the Professional Women's Hockey League (PWHL). Their first draft pick was Erin Ambrose, selected sixth overall in the 2023 PWHL draft. Montreal has participated in four PWHL Drafts and have drafted 33 players.

== Key ==
General terms and abbreviations
Term or abbreviation	Definition
Draft	The year that the player was selected
Round	The round of the draft in which the player was selected
Pick	The overall position in the draft at which the player was selected
Pos	Position of the player

Position abbreviations
Abbreviation	Definition
G	Goaltender
D	Defence
LW	Left wing
C	Centre
RW	Right wing
F	Forward

== Draft picks ==
Full list of Montreal Victoire draft picks
Draft	Round	Pick	Player	Nationality	Pos	School/club team	Conference/league
2023	1	6	Erin Ambrose	Canada	D	Team Sonnet	PWHPA
2023	2	7	Kristin O'Neill	Canada	F	Team Adidas	PWHPA
2023	3	18	Maureen Murphy	United States	F	Northeastern University	Hockey East
2023	4	19	Dominika Lásková	Czech Republic	D	Toronto Six	PHF
2023	5	30	Kati Tabin	Canada	D	Toronto Six	PHF
2023	6	31	Kennedy Marchment	Canada	F	Connecticut Whale	PHF
2023	7	42	Tereza Vanišová	Czech Republic	F	Toronto Six	PHF
2023	8	43	Madison Bizal	United States	D	Ohio State University	WCHA
2023	9	54	Gabrielle David	Canada	F	Clarkson University	ECAC
2023	10	55	Maude Poulin-Labelle	Canada	D	Northeastern University	Hockey East
2023	11	66	Jillian Dempsey	United States	F	Boston Pride	PHF
2023	12	67	Claire Dalton	Canada	F	Yale University	ECAC
2023	13	78	Elaine Chuli	Canada	G	Toronto Six	PHF
2023	14	79	Ann-Sophie Bettez	Canada	F	Montreal Force	PHF
2023	15	90	Lina Ljungblom	Sweden	F	Modo Hockey	SDHL
2024	1	5	Cayla Barnes	United States	D	Ohio State University	WCHA
2024	2	11	Jennifer Gardiner	Canada	F	Ohio State University	WCHA
2024	3	17	Abigail Boreen	United States	F	PWHL Minnesota	PWHL
2024	4	23	Dara Greig	Canada	F	Colgate University	ECAC
2024	5	29	Anna Wilgren	United States	D	University of Wisconsin	WCHA
2024	6	35	Anna Kjellbin	Sweden	D	Luleå HF/MSSK	SDHL
2024	7	41	Amanda Kessel	United States	F	— (Note: Kessel did not play for a school or club team during the 2023–24 season. She had most recently played in the 2022–23 season for Team Adidas of the Professional Women's Hockey Players Association.)	—
2025	1	4	Nicole Gosling	Canada	D	Clarkson University	ECAC
2025	2	12	Natalie Mlynkova	Czech Republic	F	University of Minnesota	WCHA
2025	3	20	Skylar Irving	United States	F	Northeastern University	Hockey East
2025	5	36	Maya Labad	Canada	F	Quinnipiac University	ECAC
2025	6	44	Tamara Giaquinto	Canada	D	Boston University	Hockey East
2026	1	12	Petra Nieminen	Finland	F	Luleå HF	SDHL
2026	2	24	Avi Adam	Canada	F	Cornell University	ECAC
2026	3	36	Zoe Uens	Canada	D	Quinnipiac University	ECAC
2026	4	48	Hailey MacLeod	Canada	G	Ohio State University	WCHA
2026	5	60	Erica Rieder	Canada	D	Luleå HF	SDHL
2026	6	72	Émilie Lavoie	Canada	D	Concordia University	RSEQ
