= 2026 ECAC Hockey women's tournament =

2026 ECAC Women's ice hockey tournament
- Dates: February 20 – March 7, 2026
- Teams: 12
- Finals site: Herb Brooks Arena; Lake Placid, New York
- Champions: Quinnipiac Bobcats (2nd title)
- Winning coach: Cassandra Turner (2nd title)
- MVP: Felicia Frank (Quinnipiac)
- ECAC Women's Ice Hockey Tournaments

The 2026 ECAC Hockey Women's Tournament was the 43d edition of the ECAC Women's Tournament. It was played between February 20 and March 7, 2026. Cornell enters the tournament as the defending champions.

The Quinnipiac Bobcats won the tournament and earned their second title. They received the conferences automatic bid to the 2026 women's ice hockey tournament.

== Format ==
The tournament included all 12 teams in the conference. The top four seeds received a bye to the quarterfinal round, while seeds five through 12 played in the first round in a single elimination game. The winners of the first round moved on to the quarterfinals for a best of three series. The semifinals and championship are single elimination, and was hosted at Herb Brooks Arena in Lake Placid, New York.

== Standings ==
2025–26 ECAC Hockey standings
	Conference							Overall					
	GP	W	L	T	PTS	GF	GA	GP	W	L	T	GF	GA
#7 Yale†	22	16	6	0	46	78	49	30	22	8	0	106	60
#9 Princeton†	22	16	6	0	46	68	37	29	21	8	0	97	47
#8 Quinnipiac*	22	14	6	2	45	69	30	34	24	7	3	113	50
#11 Cornell	22	14	7	1	42.5	70	42	30	18	10	2	93	57
#15 Clarkson	22	13	7	2	40	69	50	34	20	11	3	119	73
#14 Colgate	22	13	8	1	39.5	65	57	33	18	14	1	96	92
Brown	22	12	8	2	39	62	50	30	16	12	2	76	67
Harvard	22	8	11	3	28.5	38	50	30	14	13	3	63	63
St. Lawrence	22	8	13	1	27.5	44	57	34	11	20	3	63	85
Dartmouth	22	3	16	3	16.5	19	61	30	5	22	3	38	81
RPI	22	4	18	0	14	40	96	34	7	27	0	58	130
Union	22	3	18	1	11.5	40	83	33	10	20	3	74	103
Championship: March 7, 2026 † indicates conference regular season champion; * indicates conference tournament champion Rankings: USCHO.com; updated March 2, 2026; Source: ECAC

== Bracket ==
First Round; February 20 - 21
11	RPI	2
6	Colgate	4
12	Union	2
5	Clarkson	1
10	Dartmouth	2
7	Brown	7
9	St. Lawrence	2
8	Harvard	3*

Quarterfinals; February 27 - March 1
6	Colgate	2	1	-
4	Cornell	3	3	-
12	Union	2	1	-
1	Yale	4	6	-
7	Brown	3	3*	4
3	Quinnipiac	6	2	5
8	Harvard	0	3	1
2	Princeton	1	1	5

Semifinals; March 6
4	Cornell	2
1	Yale	7
3	Quinnipiac	2*
2	Princeton	1

Championship; March 7
1	Yale	1
3	Quinnipiac	5

Note: each * denotes one overtime period

== Results ==
=== Opening Round ===
==== (12) Union at (5) Clarkson ====
February 20, 2026; 3:00 PM	Union	2–1 (2–1, 0–0, 0–0)	Clarkson	Cheel Arena, Potsdam, New York; Attendance: 426

Emma Rhéaume
Goalies
Arianne Leblanc
Referees:
Zachary Dupree
Tom Lynch
Linesmen:
Patrick Woodward
Coby Munson

Engelbert (Fulawka, Duplantie) – pp - 7:30	1–0
Duplantie (Engelbert, Leaney) – 10:30	2–0
	2–1	18:07 – pp – Evans (S. Manness, Hurry)

6 min
Penalties
4 min
17
Shots
40

==== (11) RPI at (6) Colgate ====
February 20, 2026; 6:00 PM	RPI	2–4 (0–0, 1–3, 1–1)	Colgate	Class of 1965 Arena, Hamilton, New York; Attendance: 842

Reese Keating
Goalies
Brooke Davis
Referees:
Paul Maciejewski
William O'Malley
Linesmen:
Mike Verminski
Nick Mecca

Toye (Montanari) – 27:04	1–0
	1–1	32:12 – Copetti (Palumbo, Goofers)
	1–2	34:48 – Petford (Senecal, Aubin)
	1–3	36:54 – Aubin (Petford, Gervais Beauchamp)
	1–4	44:52 – Petford (Pickering, Senecal)
Christof (Bailey, Beaudoin) – pp – 58:38	2–4

6 min
Penalties
6 min
25
Shots
45

==== (10) Dartmouth at (7) Brown ====
February 21, 2026; 3:00 PM	Dartmouth	2–7 (0–2, 2–2, 0–3)	Brown	Meehan Auditorium, Providence, Rhode Island; Attendance: 473

Jiahui Zhan
Eleanor Rogers
Goalies
Rory Edwards
Referees:
Laura Schmidlein
Tasha Adams
Linesmen:
Marc Silva
Andrew Medeiros

	0–1	8:23 – Accardi (Richards, Broz)
	0–2	8:58 – Lian (Lyons, Iginla)
	0–3	23:50 – DeCoste (Iginla, Lyons)
Inglis (Vandenberg) – 24:04	1–3
Lehman (Inglis) – 24:04	2–3
	2–4	28:38 – Broz (Norehad, McDadi)
	2–5	47:55 – Lyons (Iginla)
	2–6	50:26 – Broz (Norehad)
	2–7	56:51 – Fantino (Li, Levy)

6 min
Penalties
2 min
20
Shots
29

==== (9) St. Lawrence at (8) Harvard ====
February 21, 2026; 3:00 PM	St. Lawrence	2–3 OT (1–1, 1–0, 0–1); OT: (0–1)	Harvard	Bright-Landry Hockey Center, Cambridge, Massachusetts; Attendance: 630

Kassidy Lawrence
Goalies
Ainsley Tuffy
Referees:
Alexander Bergeron
Charley Hurley
Linesmen:
Robert Lemnah
Cameron Reinbold

Degeer (Reeves, Davis) – 6:56	1–0
	1–1	16:29 – pp - Lucia (Lapp, Paulsen)
Benakova (Olson) – 34:42	2–1
	2–2	52:56 – Megdanis (MacDonald)
	2–3	63:23 – MacDonald (Lapp, Lucia)

2 min
Penalties
6 min
29
Shots
30

=== Quarterfinals ===
==== (12) Union at (1) Yale ====
February 27, 2026; 3:00 PM	Union	2–4 (0–1, 1–1, 1–2)	Yale	Ingalls Rink, New Haven, Connecticut; Attendance: 388

Emma Rheaume
Goalies
Anna Phillips
Referees:
Amanda Tassoni
Samantha Hiller
Linesmen:
Sarah Buckner
Matt Berg

	0–1	15:14 – DiAntonio
Duplantie (Engelbert) – 23:38	1–1
	1–2	27:38 – Gilkyson (Bell)
Fulawka (Mauracher) – 45:52	2–2
	2–3	49:07 – pp - Stainton (Rauf, Levering)
	2–4	57:32 – DiAntonio (Stainton)

23 min
Penalties
8 min
20
Shots
42

February 28, 2026; 3:00 PM	Union	1–6 (0–4, 1–1, 0–1)	Yale	Ingalls Rink, New Haven, Connecticut; Attendance: 522

Emma Rheaume
Monja Wagner
Emily Evans
Goalies
Anna Phillips
Referees:
Alexander Bergeron
Charly Hurley
Linesmen:
Robert Lemnah
Christopher Hunter

	0–1	3:55 – Stainton (Bell, Boucher)
	0–2	9:32 – Walker (Ray, Gilkyson)
	0–3	11:52 – Boyle (Gilkyson, Ray)
	0–4	13:17 – DiAntonio (Gilkyson, Boyle)
	0–5	36:26 - pp – Boyle (Ray, Gilkyson)
Loberg (Kelleher, Willis) – pp - 38:19	1–5
	1–6	58:59 - en – Ray (Stainton, DiAntonio)

6 min
Penalties
6 min
18
Shots
32

==== (6) Colgate at (4) Cornell ====
February 27, 2026; 3:00 PM	Colgate	2–3 OT (0–1, 0–1, 2–0) (OT: 0–1)	Cornell	Lynah Rink, Ithaca, New York; Attendance: 1,030

Brooke Davis
Goalies
Annelies Bergmann
Referees:
Tom Lynch
Will O'Malley
Linesmen:
Matthew White
Tim Waters

	0–1	11:09 – Schiff (Fleming, Grober)
	0–2	25:59 – Fleming (Thibodeau, MacEachern)
Petford (Biederman, Borgiel) – pp - 42:13	1–2
Petford (Pais, Biederman) – 57:57	2–2
	2–3	70:18 – Adam

8 min
Penalties
2 min
27
Shots
39

February 28, 2026; 3:00 PM	Colgate	1–3 (0–1, 0–0, 1–2)	Cornell	Lynah Rink, Ithaca, New York; Attendance: 1,300

Brooke Davis
Goalies
Annelies Bergmann
Referees:
Paul Maciejewski
Robert Ritchie
Linesmen:
Alex Walsh
Mike Verminski

	0–1	12:01 – Dwyer (Fleming, Thibodeau)
	0–2	47:29 – pp - Adam (Grober, Curtis)
Biederman (Pais, Stewart) – pp - 53:36	1–2
	1–3	59:41.6 – en - Schiff

14 min
Penalties
12 min
31
Shots
26

==== (7) Brown at (3) Quinnipiac ====
February 27, 2026; 6:00 PM	Brown	3–6 (0–1, 2–2, 1–3)	Quinnipiac	M&T Bank Arena, Hamden, Connecticut

Rory Edwards
Goalies
Felicia Frank
Referees:
Tasha Adams
Alexander Bergeron
Linesmen:
Robert Lemnah
Marc Silva

	0–1	11:28 – Lamarche (Jarvis)
	0–2	20:39 – Brueske (Johnson, Sennick)
Iginla (Lyons, Richards) – 29:49	1–2
	1–3	30:10 – Bairos (Johnson)
Norehad (Fantino, Lyons) – pp - 39:08.7	2–3
	2–4	40:38 - sh – Cormier (Jarvis)
	2–5	47:25 - Jarvis
	2–6	55:17 - en – Lamarche (Frenette, Sennick)
Norehad (Lyons, Li) – 55:36	3–6

0 min
Penalties
4 min
40
Shots
29

February 28, 2026; 3:00 PM	Brown	3–2 OT (1–0, 1–1, 0–1) (OT: 1–0)	Quinnipiac	M&T Bank Arena, Hamden, Connecticut; Attendance: 679

Anya Zupkofska
Goalies
Felicia Frank
Referees:
Amanda Tassoni
Samantha Hiller
Linesmen:
Sarah Buckner
Matt Berg

Iginla (Lyons, Lian) – 18:07	1–0
	1–1	28:50 – Lamarche (Frenette)
Norehad (Muralt, McDadi) – 35:46	2–1
	2–2	47:25 – pp - Lamarche (D'Ottavio, Prier)
Norehad (Broz) – 64:19	3–2

4 min
Penalties
4 min
24
Shots
51

March 1, 2026; 2:00 PM	Brown	4–5 (1–2, 1–2, 2–1)	Quinnipiac	M&T Bank Arena, Hamden, Connecticut; Attendance: 548

Anya Zupkofska
Goalies
Felicia Frank
Referees:
Tom Lynch
William O'Malley
Linesmen:
Coby Munson
Marc Silva

	0–1	0:32 – Jarvis (Lamarche, Uens)
	0–2	6:54 – Uens (Frenette, Jarvis)
Lyons (DeCoste, Fantino) – pp - 9:14	1–2
	1–3	28:53 – sh - Lamarche (D'Ottavio)
Broz (Fantino, Gratzl) - 30:45	2–3
	2–4	31:24 - Lamarche (D'Ottavio, Sennick)
	2–5	48:29 - Lamarche
Iginla (Lyons, Richards) – pp - 51:32	3–5
McDadi (Iginla, Lyons) - 56:12	4–5

6 min
Penalties
1 min
42
Shots
34

==== (8) Harvard at (2) Princeton ====
February 27, 2026; 3:00 PM	Harvard	0–1 (0–1, 0–0, 0–0)	Princeton	Hobey Baker Memorial Rink, Princeton, New Jersey; Attendance: 261

Ainsley Tuffy	Goalies	Uma Corniea	Referees: Paul Maciejewski; Robert Ritchie; Linesmen: Joseph Bensky; Kyle Peters
0–1 / 2:14 – Wunder (O'Leary)			Referees: Paul Maciejewski; Robert Ritchie; Linesmen: Joseph Bensky; Kyle Peters
6 min	Penalties	4 min	Referees: Paul Maciejewski; Robert Ritchie; Linesmen: Joseph Bensky; Kyle Peters
27	Shots	40	Referees: Paul Maciejewski; Robert Ritchie; Linesmen: Joseph Bensky; Kyle Peters

February 28, 2026; 3:00 PM	Harvard	3–1 (0–0, 3–0, 0–1)	Princeton	Hobey Baker Memorial Rink, Princeton, New Jersey; Attendance: 635

Ainsley Tuffy
Goalies
Uma Corniea

Linesmen:
Coby Munson
Joseph Bensky

McGathey (McSweeney, Sproule) – 22:34	1–0
McSweeney (Ley, Paulsen) – 25:52	2–0
Megdanis (Dinges) – 28:27	3–0
	3–1	46:44 – Wunder (Alexander)

2 min
Penalties
0 min
20
Shots
42

March 1, 2026; 3:00 PM	Harvard	1–5 (0–2, 1–3, 0–0)	Princeton	Hobey Baker Memorial Rink, Princeton, New Jersey; Attendance: 363

Ainsley Tuffy
Emily Davidson
Goalies
Uma Corniea
Referees:
Amanda Tassoni
Samantha Hiller
Linesmen:
Sarah Buckner
Matt Berg

	0–1	14:34 – Sorokan (Johnson)
	0–2	19:24.4 - pp – Khramtsov (Sorokan, Healy)
	0–3	25:18 – Alexander (Johnson)
	0–4	26:08 – Dimatos (Sorokan, Kuehl)
Biotti (Boosamra) – 29:05	1–4
	1–5	30:40 – Nimegeers (Kuehl, Kozak)

8 min
Penalties
10 min
26
Shots
46

=== Semifinals ===
==== (4) Cornell at (1) Yale ====
March 6, 2026; 4:00 PM	Cornell	2–7 (1–2, 0–2, 1–3)	Yale	Herb Brooks Arena, Lake Placid, New York; Attendance: 1,818

Annelies Bergmann
Goalies
Samson Frey
Referees:
Alexander Bergeron
Paul Maciejewski
Linesmen:
Joseph Bensky
Matt Berg

Adam (Prefontaine) – 00:44	1–0
	1–1	14:04 – pp – Gilkyson
	1–2	17:07 – McGowan (Muhn, Klinkhammer)
	1–3	22:47 – Boyle (McGowan)
	1–4	28:55 – DiAntonio (Ray, Klinkhammer)
Fleming (Van Gelder) – 41:33	2–4
	2–5	48:20 – sh – Stainton (Ray)
	2–6	54:45 – en – DiAntonio (Levering)
	2–7	59:54 – Peters (Walker, Smith)

4 min
Penalties
4 min
28
Shots
33

==== (3) Quinnipiac at (2) Princeton ====
March 6, 2026; 7:00 PM	Quinnipiac	2–1 OT (1–0, 0–0, 0–1) (OT: 1–0)	Princeton	Herb Brooks Arena, Lake Placid, New York; Attendance: 1,818

Felicia Frank
Goalies
Uma Corniea
Referees:
Amanda Tassoni
Zachary Dupree
Linesmen:
Robert Lemnah
Marc Silva

Brueske (Lopata) – 11:38	1–0
	1–1	48:38 – DiGirolamo (Kim)
Bairos – 63:48	2–1

8 min
Penalties
2 min
25
Shots
31

=== Finals ===
==== (3) Quinnipiac at (1) Yale ====
March 7, 2026; 5:00 PM	Quinnipiac	5–1 (1–0, 1–0, 3–1)	Yale	Herb Brooks Arena, Lake Placid, New York; Attendance: 2,228

Felicia Frank
Goalies
Samson Frey
Referees:
Tom Lynch
Will O'Malley
Linesmen:
Coby Munson
Sarah Buckner

Johnson (Watson) – 06:32	1–0
Bairos (Sennick) – 29:21	2–0
Uens (Watson, Lamarche) – pp – 43:45	3–0
	3–1	42:54 – Rauf (Ray, Boyle)
Johnson – en – 57:18	4–1
Jarvis – en – 57:41	5–1

8 min
Penalties
4 min
27
Shots
32

== Tournament Awards ==
=== All-Tournament Team ===
- F: Avery Bairos (Quinnipiac)
- F: Carina DiAntonio (Yale)
- F: Jordan Ray (Yale)
- D: Makayla Watson (Quinnipiac)
- D: Zoe Uens (Quinnipiac)
- G: Felicia Frank* (Quinnipiac)

* Most Outstanding Player
