= 2025–26 Quinnipiac Bobcats women's ice hockey season =

NCAA Division I women's hockey season

ECAC champion National Quarterfinals, L 0–6 vs Wisconsin
- Conference: ECAC
- Home ice: M&T Bank Arena

Rankings
- USA Today: #7
- USCHO.com: #7

Record
- Overall: 29–9–3
- Conference: 14–6–2
- Home: 16–2–1
- Road: 8–6–1
- Neutral: 5–1–1

Coaches and captains
- Head coach: Cassandra Turner
- Assistant coaches: Amanda Alessi; Brent Hill
- Captain: Mia Lopata
- Alternate captain(s): Tatum Blacker; Tessa Holk; Emerson Jarvis; Zoe Uens

The 2025–26 Quinnipiac Bobcats women's ice hockey season was represent the Quinnipiac University during the 2025–26 NCAA Division I women's ice hockey season. The team is coached by Cassandra Turner in her 11th season.

== Offseason ==
=== Recruiting ===
Player	Position	Class	Previous school
Jade Barbirati	Forward	Incoming freshman	
Regan Berglund	Forward	Incoming freshman	
Lincoln Brown	Forward	Incoming freshman	
Casey Clausen	Goaltender	Incoming freshman	
Peyton Cormier	Forward	Incoming freshman	
Calli Hogarth	Goaltender	Senior	Merrimack
Ella Johnson	Forward	Incoming freshman	
Alex Law	Forward	Junior	Boston University
Ella Pasqua	Forward	Incoming freshman	
Ruby Rauk	Forward	Incoming freshman	
Sophie Rousseau	Defense	Incoming freshman	

=== Departures ===
Player	Position	Class	Destination
Kendall Cooper	Defense	Minnesota Frost	
Jenna Donohue	Forward	Luleå HF	
Kaley Doyle	Goaltender	New York Sirens	
Hailey Jussila	Forward	Freshman	Sacred Heart
Maya Labad	Forward	Montreal Victoire	
Tiana McIntyre	Defense	Junior	Delaware
Meg Rittenhouse	Forward	Graduated	
Maddy Samoskevich	Defense	PWHL Vancouver	
Kathryn Stockdale	Forward	Graduated	
Sophie Urban	Forward	Graduated	

=== PWHL Draft ===
Round	Player	Position	Team
1	Kendall Cooper	Defense	Minnesota Frost
5	Maya Labad	Forward	Montreal Victoire
5	Maddy Samoskevich	Defense	PWHL Vancouver
6	Kaley Doyle	Goaltender	New York Sirens

== Standings ==
2025–26 ECAC Hockey standings
	Conference							Overall					
	GP	W	L	T	PTS	GF	GA	GP	W	L	T	GF	GA
#8 Yale †	22	16	6	0	46	78	49	36	26	10	0	126	76
#9 Princeton †	22	16	6	0	46	68	37	34	23	11	0	106	57
#7 Quinnipiac *	22	14	6	2	45	69	30	41	29	9	3	137	68
#11 Cornell	22	14	7	1	42.5	70	42	33	20	11	2	101	67
#14 Clarkson	22	13	7	2	40	69	50	35	20	12	3	210	75
#15 Colgate	22	13	8	1	39.5	65	57	36	19	16	1	103	100
Brown	22	12	8	2	39	62	50	34	18	14	2	93	82
Harvard	22	8	11	3	28.5	38	50	34	16	15	3	70	72
St. Lawrence	22	8	13	1	27.5	44	57	35	11	21	3	65	88
Dartmouth	22	3	16	3	16.5	19	61	31	5	23	3	40	88
RPI	22	4	18	0	14	40	96	35	7	28	0	60	134
Union	22	3	18	1	11.5	40	83	36	11	22	3	79	114
Championship: March 7, 2026 † indicates conference regular season champion; * indicates conference tournament champion Rankings: USCHO.com; updated March 23, 2026

== Roster ==
As of November 1, 2025.

No.	Nat.	Player	Class	Pos	Height	DoB	Hometown	Previous team
2	(Canada)	Zoe Uens (A)	Senior	D	5' 9" (1.75 m)	2003-11-12	Belleville, Ontario	Kingston Jr. Ice Wolves
3	(Canada)	Aynsley D'Ottavio	Sophomore	D	5' 10" (1.78 m)	2006-08-13	Rosedale, British Columbia	Etobicoke Junior Dolphins
4	(United States)	Sophie Rousseau	Freshman	D	5' 8" (1.73 m)	2004-07-21	Wilmington, North Carolina	Kent School
5	(United States)	Ella Sennick	Sophomore	D	5' 10" (1.78 m)	2006-03-10	Lafayette Hill, Pennsylvania	Philadelphia Jr. Flyers
6	(United States)	Ruby Rauk	Freshman	F	5' 7" (1.7 m)	2006-10-15	Minnetonka, Minnesota	Minnetonka High School
7	(Canada)	Tessa Holk (A)	Senior	F	5' 4" (1.63 m)	2004-06-01	Ancaster, Ontario	Colgate
8	(Canada)	Kahlen Lamarche	Junior	F	5' 6" (1.68 m)	2005-04-16	Sudbury, Ontario	Everest Academy
9	(United States)	Taylor Brueske	Sophomore	F	5' 8" (1.73 m)	2006-02-17	Moorhead, Minnesota	Moorhead High School
10	(Canada)	Avery Bairos	Sophomore	F	5' 6" (1.68 m)	2006-09-01	Saskatoon, Saskatchewan	Saskatoon Stars
11	(United States)	Regan Berglund	Freshman	F	5' 10" (1.78 m)	2007-01-19	Hugo, Minnesota	Hill-Murray School
12	(Canada)	Emerson Jarvis (A)	Senior	F	5' 4" (1.63 m)	2004-10-13	Edmonton, Alberta	Ohio State
14	(United States)	Ella Pasqua	Freshman	F	5' 8" (1.73 m)	2006-09-22	Long Lake, Minnesota	Benilde-St. Margaret's
15	(Canada)	Lincoln Brown	Freshman	F	5' 7" (1.7 m)	2007-05-31	Los Angeles, California	Culver Academy
16	(United States)	Bryn Prier	Sophomore	F	5' 4" (1.63 m)	2004-10-31	Juno Beach, Florida	Burlington Barracudas
17	(United States)	Brynne West	Junior	D	5' 9" (1.75 m)	2005-01-17	River Forest, Illinois	Fenwick High School
18	(United States)	Mia Lopata (C)	Graduate	D	5' 9" (1.75 m)	2003-05-13	Clinton, New York	Clinton High School
19	(Canada)	Alex Law	Junior	F	5' 8" (1.73 m)	2005-08-16	Whitby, Ontario	Boston University
21	(Canada)	Laurence Frenette	Graduate	F	5' 7" (1.7 m)	2003-02-24	Boisbriand, Quebec	Clarkson
22	(France)	Jade Barbirati	Freshman	F	5' 6" (1.68 m)	2004-01-06	Sonnaz, Savoie, France	John Abbott College
27	(United States)	Ella Johnson	Freshman	F	5' 10" (1.78 m)	2007-07-25	Palmer, Alaska	North American Hockey Academy
28	(Canada)	Makayla Watson	Sophomore	D	5' 6" (1.68 m)	2006-05-22	Brooks, Alberta	RINK Hockey Academy Kelowna
29	(Canada)	Peyton Cormier	Freshman	F	5' 4" (1.63 m)	2007-01-14	Trenton, Ontario	Kingston Jr. Ice Wolves
30	(Sweden)	Felicia Frank	Sophomore	G	5' 9" (1.75 m)	2005-02-27	Falköping, Sweden	Brynäs IF
33	(United States)	Casey Clausen	Freshman	G	5' 8" (1.73 m)	2007-00-00	Whitesboro, New York	Northwood School
41	(Canada)	Calli Hogarth	Senior	G	6' 0" (1.83 m)	2004-05-17	Barrie, Ontario	Merrimack
50	(United States)	Tatum Blacker (A)	Senior	G	5' 5" (1.65 m)	2004-07-28	Vernon Hills, Illinois	Chicago Young Americans

== Schedule ==
Date	Time	Opponent^{#}	Rank^{#}	Site	Decision	Result	Attendance	Record	Ref
Regular Season
September 26	6:00	Maine*	#10	M&T Bank Arena • Hamden, CT	Frank	W 3–2	379	1–0–0	
September 27	3:00	Maine*	#10	M&T Bank Arena • Hamden, CT	Frank	W 4–3 ^{OT}	516	2–0–0	
October 3	2:00	at Providence*	#8	Schneider Arena • Providence, RI	Frank	W 5–2	347	3–0–0	
October 4	3:00	Providence*	#8	M&T Bank Arena • Hamden, CT	Frank	W 5–0	408	4–0–0	
October 10	5:00	at Syracuse*	#7	Tennity Ice Skating Pavilion • Syracuse, NY	Frank	W 3–0	144	5–0–0	
October 11	3:00	at Syracuse*	#7	Tennity Ice Skating Pavilion • Syracuse, NY	Frank	W 5–1	185	6–0–0	
October 17	3:00	#12 Northeastern*	#7	M&T Bank Arena • Hamden, CT	Frank	W 5–3	342	7–0–0	
October 18	1:00	#12 Northeastern*	#7	M&T Bank Arena • Hamden, CT	Frank	W 4–2	558	8–0–0	
October 24	6:00	at #13 Yale	#7	Ingalls Rink • New Haven, CT	Frank	W 3–1	582	9–0–0 (1–0–0)	
October 25	3:00	at Brown	#7	Meehan Auditorium • Providence, RI	Frank	L 0–1	273	9–1–0 (1–1–0)	
October 31	4:30	Union	#7	M&T Bank Arena • Hamden, CT	Frank	W 6–1	207	10–1–0 (2–1–0)	
November 1	3:00	RPI	#7	M&T Bank Arena • Hamden, CT	Frank	W 8–0	631	11–1–0 (3–1–0)	
November 7	6:00	St. Lawrence	#7	M&T Bank Arena • Hamden, CT	Frank	W 3–2 ^{OT}	422	12–1–0 (4–1–0)	
November 8	3:00	#11 Clarkson	#7	M&T Bank Arena • Hamden, CT	Frank	T 0–0 ^{SOL}	581	12–1–1 (4–1–1)	
November 20	6:00	Princeton	#7	Hobey Baker Memorial Rink • Princeton, NJ	Frank	L 3–4 ^{OT}	429	12–2–1 (4–2–1)	
November 22	3:00	Princeton	#7	M&T Bank Arena • Hamden, CT	Frank	L 0–2	283	12–3–1 (4–3–1)	
November 28	3:00	vs. #8 Connecticut*	#9	Toscano Family Ice Forum • Storrs, CT (Nutmeg Classic)	Frank	L 3–4	743	12–4–1	
November 29	3:00	vs. Sacred Heart*	#9	Toscano Family Ice Forum • Storrs, CT (Nutmeg Classic)	Frank	W 2–0	179	13–4–1	
December 5	6:00	at #8 Cornell	#9	Lynah Rink • Ithaca, NY	Frank	W 3–0	760	14–4–1 (5–3–1)	
December 6	3:00	at #14 Colgate	#9	Class of 1965 Arena • Hamilton, NY	Frank	L 1–2 ^{OT}	819	14–5–1 (5–4–1)	
January 2	2:00	vs. Boston University*	#8	SSE Arena • Belfast, Northern Ireland	Frank	T 2–2 ^{SOL}	X	14–6–2	
January 3	10:00	vs. #5 Minnesota Duluth*	#8	SSE Arena • Belfast, Northern Ireland	Frank	W 3–1	X	15–6–2	
January 9	6:00	at RPI	#7	Houston Field House • Troy, NY	Frank	W 5–1	842	16–6–2 (6–4–1)	
January 10	3:00	at Union	#7	M&T Bank Center • Schenectady, NY	Frank	W 5–1	121	17–6–2 (7–4–1)	
January 16	6:00	Dartmouth	#6	M&T Bank Arena • Hamden, CT	Frank	W 4–0	426	18–6–2 (8–4–1)	
January 17	3:00	Harvard	#6	M&T Bank Arena • Hamden, CT	Frank	W 4–1	806	19–6–2 (9–4–1)	
January 23	6:00	Colgate	#6	M&T Bank Arena • Hamden, CT	Frank	W 5–1	328	20–6–2 (10–4–1)	
January 24	3:00	#12 Cornell	#6	M&T Bank Arena • Hamden, CT	Frank	W 4–0	709	21–6–2 (11–4–1)	
January 30	3:00	at #11 Clarkson	#5	Cheel Arena • Potsdam, NY	Frank	L 1–4	423	21–6–2 (11–5–1)	
January 31	2:00	at St. Lawrence	#5	Appleton Arena • Canton, NY	Frank	L 1–3	431	21–7–2 (11–6–1)	
February 6	6:00	at Harvard	#8	Bright-Landry Hockey Center • Cambridge, MA	Frank	T 1–1 ^{SOL}	337	21–7–3 (11–6–2)	
February 7	3:00	at Dartmouth	#8	Thompson Arena • Hanover, NH	Frank	W 3–0	750	22–7–3 (12–6–2)	
February 13	6:00	Brown	#7	M&T Bank Arena • Hamden, CT	Frank	W 5–2	402	23–7–3 (13–6–2)	
February 14	3:00	#9 Yale	#7	M&T Bank Arena • Hamden, CT	Frank	W 4–3 ^{OT}	876	24–7–3 (14–6–2)	
ECAC Tournament
February 27	6:00	Brown	#7	M&T Bank Arena • Hamden, CT (Quarterfinals)	Frank	W 6–3	747	25–7–3	
February 28	3:00	Brown	#7	M&T Bank Arena • Hamden, CT (Quarterfinals)	Frank	L 2–3 ^{OT}	679	25–8–3	
March 1	2:00	Brown	#7	M&T Bank Arena • Hamden, CT (Quarterfinals)	Frank	W 5–4	548	26–8–3	
March 6	7:00	vs. #9 Princeton	#8	Herb Brooks Arena • Lake Placid, NY (Semifinals)	Frank	W 2–1 ^{OT}	998	27–8–3	
March 7	5:00	vs. #7 Yale	#8	Herb Brooks Arena • Lake Placid, NY (Championship)	Frank	W 5–1	998	28–8–3	
NCAA Tournament
March 12	8:00	vs. Franklin Pierce	#7	LaBahn Arena • Madison, WI (First Round)	Frank	W 4–0	560	29–8–3	
March 14	2:00	vs. #2 Wisconsin	#7	LaBahn Arena • Madison, WI (Quarterfinals)	Frank	L 0–6	2,400	29–9–3	
*Non-conference game. ^{#}Rankings from USCHO.com Poll.
