= List of Seattle Torrent draft picks =

The Seattle Torrent are a professional ice hockey team in the Professional Women's Hockey League (PWHL) that was founded ahead of the 2025–26 season as an expansion team. Their first draft pick was Jenna Buglioni, selected eighth overall in the 2025 PWHL Draft. Seattle has participated in two PWHL Drafts and have drafted twelve players.

== Key ==
General terms and abbreviations
Term or abbreviation	Definition
Draft	The year that the player was selected
Round	The round of the draft in which the player was selected
Pick	The overall position in the draft at which the player was selected
Pos	Position of the player

Position abbreviations
Abbreviation	Definition
G	Goaltender
D	Defense
LW	Left wing
C	Center
RW	Right wing
F	Forward

== Draft picks ==
Full list of PWHL Vancouver draft picks
Draft	Round	Pick	Player	Nationality	Pos	School/club team	Conference/league
2025	1	8	Jenna Buglioni	Canada	F	Ohio State University	WCHA
2025	2	15	Hannah Murphy	Canada	G	Colgate University	ECAC
2025	3	24	Lily Delianedis	United States	F	Cornell University	ECAC
2025	4	31	Jada Habisch	United States	F	University of Connecticut	Hockey East
2025	5	40	Lyndie Lobdell	United States	D	Penn State University	AHA
2025	6	47	Olivia Wallin	Canada	F	University of Minnesota Duluth	WCHA
2026	1	2	Abbey Murphy	United States	F	University of Minnesota	WCHA
2026	2	14	Sydney Morrow	United States	D	University of Minnesota	WCHA
2026	3	26	Emerson Jarvis	Canada	F	Quinnipiac University	ECAC
2026	4	38	Grace Elliott	Canada	F	University of British Columbia	Canada West
2026	5	50	Gracie Gilkyson	Canada	D	Yale University	ECAC
2026	6	62	Gabriella Durante	Italy	G	Real Torino	ILHW
