= 2025–26 Cornell Big Red women's ice hockey season =

NCAA Division I women's hockey season

- Conference: ECAC
- Home ice: Lynah Rink

Rankings
- USA Today: #4
- USCHO.com: #4

Record
- Overall: 9–2–0
- Conference: 6–2–0
- Home: 6–0–0
- Road: 3–2–0

Coaches and captains
- Head coach: Doug Derraugh
- Assistant coaches: Edith Racine; Tim Crowley
- Captain(s): Grace Dwyer; Sarah MacEachern; Mckenna Van Gelder

The 2025–26 Cornell Big Red women's ice hockey season will represent Cornell University during the 2025–26 NCAA Division I women's ice hockey season. The team is coached by Doug Derraugh in his 20th season.

== Offseason ==
=== Recruiting ===
Player	Position	Class	Previous school
Nora Curtis	Forward	Incoming freshman	
Liv Ferebee	Goaltender	Incoming freshman	
London McDavid	Forward	Incoming freshman	
Lily Pachl	Defense	Incoming freshman	
Shannon Pearson	Forward	Incoming freshman	
Riley Scorgie	Forward	Incoming freshman	

=== Departures ===
Player	Position	Class	Destination
Caroline Chan	Forward	Senior	Left program
Katie Chan	Forward	Vancouver Goldeneyes	
Alexa Davis	Defense	Graduate	St. Lawrence
Lily Delianedis	Forward	PWHL Seattle	
Brynn DuLac	Goaltender	Graduated	
Rory Guilday	Defense	Ottawa Charge	
Angela Huo	Forward	Graduated	
Kaitlin Jockims	Forward	Djurgårdens IF	
Belle Mende	Goaltender	Graduate	Concordia
Ashley Messier	Defense	Graduate	Minnesota Duluth
Gabbie Rud	Forward	Graduated	
Claudia Yu	Forward	Graduated	

=== PWHL Draft ===
Round	Player	Position	Team
1	Rory Guilday	Defense	Ottawa Charge
3	Lily Delianedis	Forward	PWHL Seattle

== Standings ==
2025–26 ECAC Hockey standings
	Conference							Overall					
	GP	W	L	T	PTS	GF	GA	GP	W	L	T	GF	GA
#8 Yale †	22	16	6	0	46	78	49	36	26	10	0	126	76
#9 Princeton †	22	16	6	0	46	68	37	34	23	11	0	106	57
#7 Quinnipiac *	22	14	6	2	45	69	30	41	29	9	3	137	68
#11 Cornell	22	14	7	1	42.5	70	42	33	20	11	2	101	67
#14 Clarkson	22	13	7	2	40	69	50	35	20	12	3	210	75
#15 Colgate	22	13	8	1	39.5	65	57	36	19	16	1	103	100
Brown	22	12	8	2	39	62	50	34	18	14	2	93	82
Harvard	22	8	11	3	28.5	38	50	34	16	15	3	70	72
St. Lawrence	22	8	13	1	27.5	44	57	35	11	21	3	65	88
Dartmouth	22	3	16	3	16.5	19	61	31	5	23	3	40	88
RPI	22	4	18	0	14	40	96	35	7	28	0	60	134
Union	22	3	18	1	11.5	40	83	36	11	22	3	79	114
Championship: March 7, 2026 † indicates conference regular season champion; * indicates conference tournament champion Rankings: USCHO.com; updated March 23, 2026

== Roster ==
As of October 29, 2025.

No.	Nat.	Player	Class	Pos	Height	DoB	Hometown	Previous team
1	(Canada)	Jeanne Lortie	Sophomore	G	5' 7" (1.7 m)	2004-04-02	Montreal, Quebec	Dawson College
2	(United States)	Georgia Schiff	Senior	F	5' 9" (1.75 m)	2004-03-27	Montpelier, Vermont	North American Hockey Academy
3	(Canada)	Piper Grober	Junior	D	5' 7" (1.7 m)	2005-08-03	Toronto, Ontario	Durham Lightning
4	(United States)	Grace Dwyer (C)	Senior	D	5' 8" (1.73 m)	2004-07-21	Wynnewood, Pennsylvania	USA U-18
5	(United States)	Lily Pachl	Freshman	D	5' 3" (1.6 m)	2007-08-28	Hudson, Wisconsin	South St. Paul High School
6	(Canada)	Alyssa Regalado	Senior	D	5' 7" (1.7 m)	2004-01-03	Mississauga, Ontario	Etobicoke Dolphins
7	(Canada)	Abby Thibodeau	Junior	D	5' 5" (1.65 m)	2004-05-12	Fonthill, Ontario	Burlington Barracudas
9	(United States)	Lindzi Avar	Sophomore	F	5' 10" (1.78 m)	2005-12-12	Chanhassen, Minnesota	USA U-18
10	(Canada)	Beatrice Perron-Roy	Junior	F	5' 5" (1.65 m)	2005-03-09	Sherbrooke, Quebec	Stanstead College
12	(Canada)	Riley Scorgie	Freshman	F	5' 6" (1.68 m)	2006-09-14	Edmonton, Alberta	Vimy Ridge Academy
13	(Canada)	Sarah MacEachern (C)	Senior	D	5' 8" (1.73 m)	2004-03-29	Canoe Cove, Prince Edward Island	Etobicoke Dolphins
15	(Canada)	Avi Adam	Senior	F	5' 9" (1.75 m)	2004-08-15	Wolfville, Nova Scotia	Etobicoke Dolphins
16	(United States)	Rose Dwyer	Sophomore	D	5' 10" (1.78 m)	2006-04-07	Wynnewood, Pennsylvania	USA U-18
17	(Canada)	Mckenna Van Gelder (C)	Senior	F	5' 7" (1.7 m)	2004-01-24	Etobicoke, Ontario	Etobicoke Dolphins
18	(United States)	Delaney Fleming	Junior	F	5' 4" (1.63 m)	2005-05-25	Rochester, Minnesota	Ohio State
19	(Canada)	Karel Prefontaine (A)	Junior	F	5' 4" (1.63 m)	2004-12-17	Gatineau, Quebec	Stanstead College
24	(United States)	Nora Curtis	Freshman	F	5' 10" (1.78 m)	2006-01-09	Skaneateles, New York	Williston Northampton School
31	(United States)	Liv Ferebee	Freshman	G	5' 5" (1.65 m)	2006-01-31	Lake Placid, New York	Williston Northampton School
43	(United States)	Annelies Bergmann	Junior	G	6' 1" (1.85 m)	2005-11-22	Detroit, Michigan	Oakland Grizzlies
47	(Canada)	Shannon Pearson	Freshman	F	5' 5" (1.65 m)	2007-03-27	Calgary, Alberta	Calgary Edge School
79	(Canada)	London McDavid	Freshman	F	5' 7" (1.7 m)	2007-03-29	Maple Ridge, British Columbia	North Delta Secondary School

== Schedule and results ==
Date	Time	Opponent^{#}	Rank^{#}	Site	Decision	Result	Attendance	Record	Ref
Regular Season
October 17	4:00 PM	Boston College*	#5	Lynah Rink • Ithaca, NY	Bergmann	W 3–0	725	1–0–0	
October 18	3:00 PM	Boston College*	#5	Lynah Rink • Ithaca, NY	Bergmann	W 4–2	950	2–0–0	
October 24	5:00 PM	at Harvard	#5	Bright-Landry Hockey Center • Cambridge, MA	Bergmann	W 5–2	539	3–0–0 (1–0–0)	
October 25	3:00 PM	at Dartmouth	#5	Thompson Arena • Hanover, NH	Bergmann	W 5–0	735	4–0–0 (2–0–0)	
October 28	7:00 PM	Syracuse*	#4	Lynah Rink • Ithaca, NY	Bergmann	W 5–0	450	5–0–0	
October 31	5:00 PM	#14 Yale	#4	Lynah Rink • Ithaca, NY	Bergmann	W 3–0	481	6–0–0 (3–0–0)	
November 1	3:00 PM	#15 Brown	#4	Lynah Rink • Ithaca, NY	Bergmann	W 5–1	1,038	7–0–0 (4–0–0)	
November 14	3:00 PM	at #14 Colgate	#4	Class of 1965 Arena • Hamilton, NY	Bergmann	L 0–3	713	7–1–0 (4–1–0)	
November 15	3:00 PM	#14 Colgate	#4	Lynah Rink • Ithaca, NY	Bergmann	W 4–3 ^{OT}	950	8–1–0 (5–1–0)	
November 21	6:00 PM	at Union	#4	M&T Bank Center • Schenectady, NY	Bergmann	L 3–4 ^{OT}	348	8–2–0 (5–2–0)	
November 22	3:00 PM	at RPI	#4	Houston Field House • Troy, NY	Bergmann	W 4–1	885	9–2–0 (6–2–0)	
November 25	6:00 PM	at Syracuse*		Tennity Ice Skating Pavilion • Syracuse, NY					
November 28	6:00 PM	at Vermont*		Gutterson Fieldhouse • Burlington, VT					
November 29	3:00 PM	at Vermont*		Gutterson Fieldhouse • Burlington, VT					
December 5	6:00 PM	Quinnipiac		Lynah Rink • Ithaca, NY					
December 6	3:00 PM	Princeton		Lynah Rink • Ithaca, NY					
December 30	6:00 PM	at Penn State*		Pegula Ice Arena • University Park, PA					
January 9	3:00 PM	Clarkson		Lynah Rink • Ithaca, NY					
January 10	3:00 PM	St. Lawrence		Lynah Rink • Ithaca, NY					
January 16	6:00 PM	at Brown		Meehan Auditorium • Providence, RI					
January 17	3:00 PM	at Yale		Ingalls Rink • New Haven, CT					
January 20	6:00 PM	Penn State*		Lynah Rink • Ithaca, NY					
January 23	6:00 PM	at Princeton		Hobey Baker Memorial Rink • Princeton, NJ					
January 24	3:00 PM	at Quinnipiac		M&T Bank Arena • Hamden, CT					
January 30	6:00 PM	Dartmouth		Lynah Rink • Ithaca, NY					
January 31	3:00 PM	Harvard		Lynah Rink • Ithaca, NY					
February 6	5:00 PM	RPI		Lynah Rink • Ithaca, NY					
February 7	3:00 PM	Union		Lynah Rink • Ithaca, NY					
February 13	6:00 PM	at St. Lawrence		Appleton Arena • Canton, NY					
February 15	3:00 PM	at Clarkson		Cheel Arena • Potsdam, NY					
*Non-conference game. ^{#}Rankings from USCHO.com Poll. All times are in Eastern Time. Source:
