= Quinnipiac Bobcats ice hockey =

Quinnipiac Bobcats ice hockey may refer to either of the ice hockey teams that represent Quinnipiac University:

- Quinnipiac Bobcats men's ice hockey
- Quinnipiac Bobcats women's ice hockey
