= Jordan Ray =

- Born: July 22, 2004 (age 22) Rockledge, Florida, U.S.
- Height: 5 ft 7 in (170 cm)
- Position: Forward
- Shoots: Right
- PWHL team Former teams: Ottawa Charge; Yale Bulldogs (ECAC)
- Playing career: 2026–present

Jordan Ray (born July 22, 2004) is an American professional ice hockey forward for the Ottawa Charge of the Professional Women's Hockey League (PWHL). She played college ice hockey at Yale.

== Playing career ==
=== College ===
In her final season (2025–26) with the Yale Bulldogs, Ray logged 17 goals and a team best 33 assists. She graduated third in program history with 145 career points.

=== Professional ===
On June 17, 2026, Ray was drafted in the second round, 23rd overall, by the Ottawa Charge in the 2026 PWHL Draft. Ray was among four Bulldogs alumnae selected in the 2026 Draft, including Carina DiAntonio, Gracie Gilkyson and Naomi Boucher.

== Awards and honors ==
- ECAC All Academic (2022–23, 2023–24)
- Second Team All ECAC (2025–26)
- First Team All Ivy (2025–26)
- NEWHA Division I All-Star (2025–26)
