= Kati Tabin =

Canadian ice hockey player (born 1997)

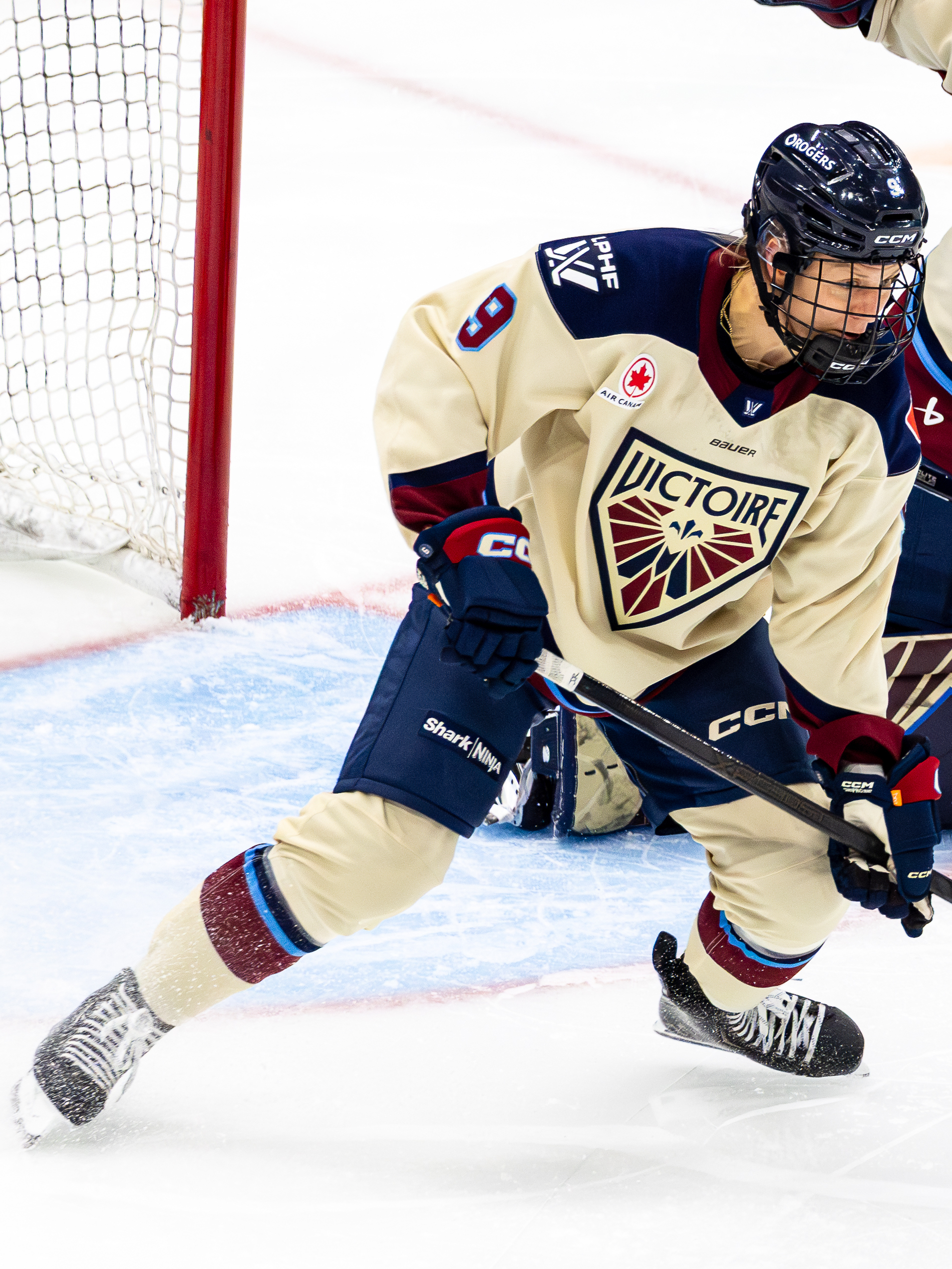
- Tabin with the Montreal Victoire in 2025
- Born: April 21, 1997 (age 29) Winnipeg, Manitoba, Canada
- Height: 5 ft 8 in (173 cm)
- Weight: 150 lb (68 kg; 10 st 10 lb)
- Position: Defence
- Shoots: Left
- PWHL team Former teams: Montreal Victoire; Connecticut Whale; Toronto Six Cambridge Rivulettes
- National team: Canada
- Playing career: 2016–present
Medal record
Olympic Games
Silver medal – second place	2026 Milano Cortina	Team
World Championships
Silver medal – second place	2026 Denmark

Kati Tabin (born April 21, 1997) is a Canadian professional ice hockey defender for the Montreal Victoire of the Professional Women's Hockey League (PWHL). She previously played for the Connecticut Whale and Toronto Six of the Premier Hockey Federation (PHF). She played college ice hockey at Quinnipiac.

== Playing career ==
=== College ===
Tabin began her collegiate career for Quinnipiac during the 2016–17 season. During her freshman year, she recorded two goals and five assists in 32 games. She scored her first career goal on November 4, 2016, in a game against Clarkson. During the 2017–18 season in her sophomore year, she recorded a three goals and 11 assists in 38 games. During the 2018–19 season in her junior year, she recorded four goals and nine assists in 36 games.

On September 10, 2019, Tabin was named co-captain for the 2019–20 season. During her senior year, she recorded five goals and 13 assists in 37 games. Following the season, she was named to the All-ECAC Third Team.

=== Professional ===
Tabin made her professional debut for the Connecticut Whale of the PHF on November 14, 2021. During the 2021–22 season, she appeared in six games for the Whale.

On July 28, 2022, she signed a one-year contract with the Toronto Six of the PHF. During the 2022–23 season, she led all defenders in scoring with four goals and 14 assists in 24 regular season games. During the playoffs, she recorded one goal and three assists in four games, and helped lead the Six to the Isobel Cup. On June 12, 2023, she signed a two-year contract extension with Toronto.

On September 18, 2023, Tabin was drafted in the fifth round, 30th overall, by PWHL Montreal in the 2023 PWHL Draft. On November 21, 2023, she signed a two-year contract with Montreal. During the 2023–24 season, she recorded one goal and five assists in 24 regular season games. She played on Montreal's top pairing with Erin Ambrose, and led all PWHL players with 26 blocked shots. During the 2024–25 season, she recorded four goals and four assists in 28 games. She ranked second on the team with 26 hits. On June 16, 2025, she signed a two-year contract extension with Montreal. During the 2026 PWHL Expansion Draft, she was one of three players, who were allowed to be protected in the third round by Montreal.

== International play ==
On January 9, 2026, she was named to Canada's roster to compete at the 2026 Winter Olympics. On February 7, 2026, Tabin was one of six Canadian skaters making their Olympic debut as Canada played Switzerland.

== Career statistics ==
			Regular season					Playoffs
Season	Team	League	GP	G	A	Pts	PIM	GP	G	A	Pts	PIM
2016–17	Quinnipiac University	ECAC	32	2	5	7	10	—	—	—	—	—
2017–18	Quinnipiac University	ECAC	36	3	11	14	16	—	—	—	—	—
2018–19	Quinnipiac University	ECAC	36	4	9	13	10	—	—	—	—	—
2019–20	Quinnipiac University	ECAC	37	5	13	18	20	—	—	—	—	—
2021–22	Connecticut Whale	PHF	6	0	0	0	0	—	—	—	—	—
2022–23	Toronto Six	PHF	24	4	14	18	16	4	1	3	4	0
2023–24	PWHL Montreal	PWHL	24	1	5	6	14	3	0	0	0	0
2024–25	Montreal Victoire	PWHL	28	4	4	8	23	4	0	1	1	4
2025–26	Montreal Victoire	PWHL	30	2	10	12	12	9	1	1	2	6
PHF totals			30	4	14	18	16	4	1	3	4	0
PWHL totals			82	7	19	26	49	16	1	2	3	10

== Awards and honours ==
Honours	Year
PWHL
Walter Cup champion	2026
