= Erica Udén Johansson =

Swedish ice hockey player (born 1989)

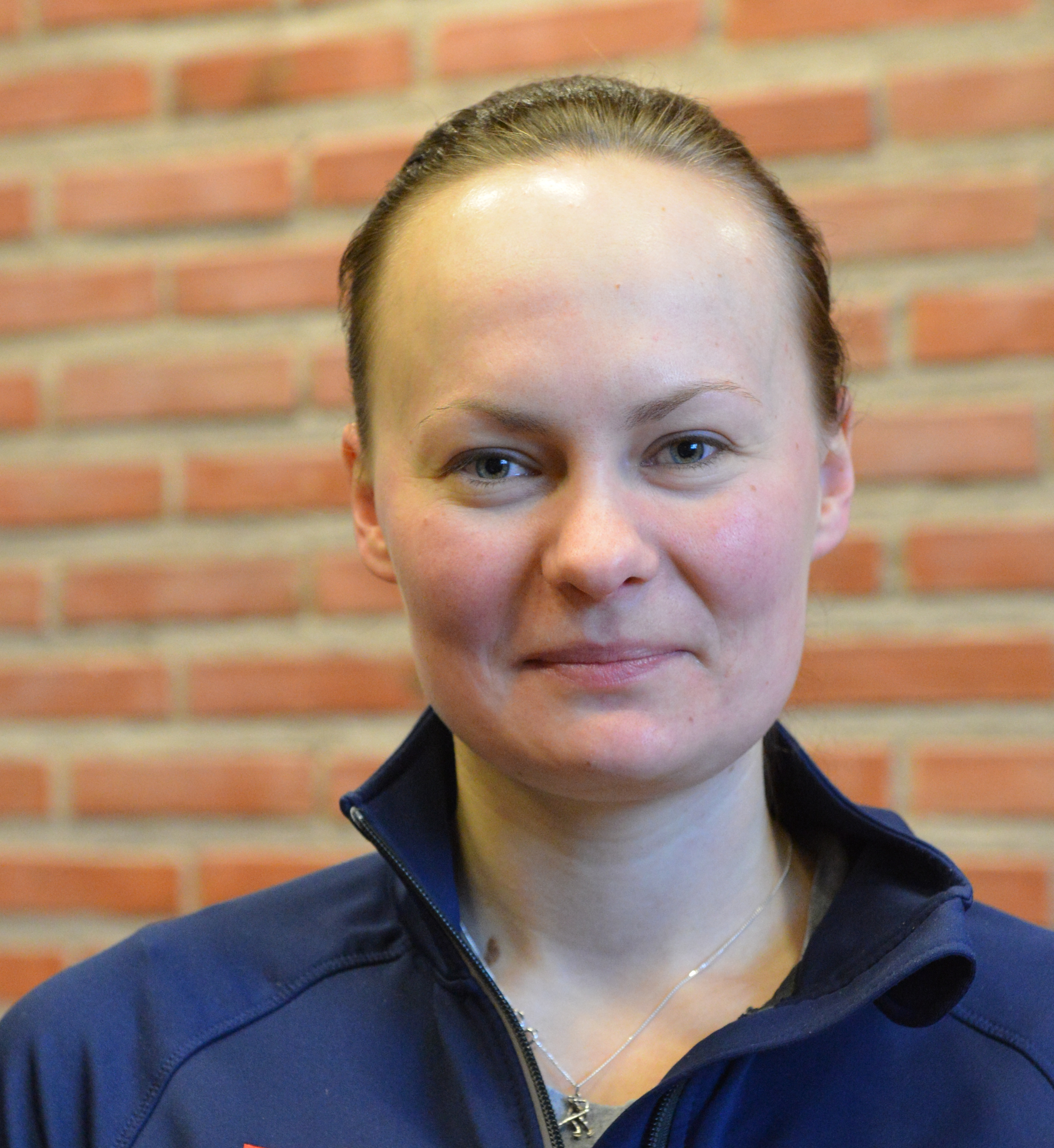
- Udén Johansson in 2016
- Born: 20 July 1989 (age 37) Njurunda, Sundsvall, Sweden
- Height: 172 cm (5 ft 8 in)
- Weight: 72 kg (159 lb; 11 st 5 lb)
- Position: Right wing
- Shot: Left
- Played for: AIK Hockey; Sundsvall/Timrå; Modo Hockey; Quinnipiac Bobcats; Segeltorps IF
- National team: Sweden
- Playing career: 2004–2022
- Coaching career: 2022–present

Erica Udén Johansson (born 20 July 1989) is a Swedish retired ice hockey player, currently serving as conditioning coach of AIK Hockey Dam in the Swedish Women's Hockey League (SDHL). An eleven-season member of the Swedish national team, she participated in the women's ice hockey tournaments at the Winter Olympics in 2010, 2014, and 2018. Udén Johansson played college ice hockey in the NCAA with the Quinnipiac Bobcats women's ice hockey program.

== Playing career ==
=== Sweden ===
Udén Johansson was a member of the IF Sundsvall Hockey Wildcats of the Swedish women's Division 1 from 2005 to 2008. During 2007 to 2009, Udén Johansson played with Modo Hockey Dam in the Riksserien (renamed SDHL in 2016). She signed with Segeltorps IF for the 2009–10 Riksserien season.

=== NCAA ===
Udén Johansson joined the Quinnipiac Bobcats women's ice hockey program in 2010–11. Against the Sacred Heart Pioneers on 10 October 2010, Udén Johansson scored a hat trick.

== Awards and honors ==
- 2008 and 2009 Swedish champion bronze medalist with Modo
- 2010 Swedish champion gold medalist with Segeltorps IF
- MLX Skates Player of the Week (week of 12 October 2010)
- MLX Skates Rookie of the Week (week of 12 October 2010)
