= Carina DiAntonio =

Canadian ice hockey player (born 2004)

- Born: January 19, 2004 (age 22) Mississauga, Ontario, Canada
- Height: 5 ft 3 in (160 cm)
- Position: Forward
- Shoots: Left
- PWHL team Former teams: New York Sirens; Yale Bulldogs (ECAC)
- Playing career: 2022–present

Carina DiAntonio (born January 19, 2004) is a Canadian professional ice hockey forward for the New York Sirens of the Professional Women's Hockey League (PWHL). She played college ice hockey at Yale.

== Playing career ==
=== College ===
DiAntonio began her college ice hockey career for Yale during the 2022–23 season. During her freshman year, she recorded 16 goals and 13 assists in 33 games. During the 2023–24 season, in her sophomore year, she recorded eight goals and 11 assists in 31 games. During the 2024–25 season, her junior year, she recorded 13 goals and 21 assists in 32 games.

On April 9, 2025, she was named captain for the 2025–26 season. During her senior year, she recorded a career-high 26 goals and 22 assists in 36 games. Following the season she was named to the All-ECAC Second Team.

=== Professional ===
On June 17, 2026, DiAntonio was drafted in the third round, 31st overall, by the New York Sirens in the 2026 PWHL Draft. She was among four Bulldogs graduates selected in the PWHL Draft, including Jordan Ray, Gracie Gilkyson and Naomi Boucher. This marked the first PWHL Draft in which Yale had multiple players selected.

== Career statistics ==
| | | | Regular season | | | | | Playoffs |
| Season | Team | League | GP | G | A | Pts | PIM | GP | G | A | Pts | PIM |
|---|---|---|---|---|---|---|---|---|---|---|---|---|
| 2022–23 | Yale University | ECAC | 33 | 16 | 13 | 29 | 4 | — | — | — | — | — |
| 2023–24 | Yale University | ECAC | 31 | 8 | 11 | 19 | 19 | — | — | — | — | — |
| 2024–25 | Yale University | ECAC | 32 | 13 | 21 | 34 | 25 | — | — | — | — | — |
| 2025–26 | Yale University | ECAC | 36 | 26 | 22 | 48 | 12 | — | — | — | — | — |
| NCAA totals | | | 132 | 63 | 67 | 130 | 60 | — | — | — | — | — |
