= Erica Rieder =

Canadian ice hockey defender

- Born: December 11, 1996 (age 29) Regina, Saskatchewan, Canada
- Height: 176 cm (5 ft 9 in)
- Weight: 77 kg (170 lb; 12 st 2 lb)
- Position: Defence
- Shoots: Left
- SDHL team Former teams: Modo Hockey; Manitoba Bisons
- Playing career: 2014–present

Erica Rieder (born December 11, 1996) is a Canadian ice hockey defenceman, currently playing with MoDo Hockey Dam in the Swedish Women's Hockey League (SDHL). She won the Canada West conference championship of U Sports twice with the Manitoba Bisons women's ice hockey program. She was drafted sixtieth overall by the Montreal Victoire in the 2026 PWHL Draft.

== Career ==
She turned down an offer from the UBC Thunderbirds women's ice hockey program of the University of British Columbia, opting instead to join the Bisons of the University of Manitoba in 2014. Across the next five seasons with the university, she scored 65 points in 135 U Sports games. She was named to the 2014–15 Canada West Rookie All-Star Team. She was awarded a $1500 scholarship by the Manitoba Hockey Hall of Fame in 2018. She served as the team's captain for the 2018–19 season, where she scored a career-best 17 points in 28 games, leading all Canada West defenders in scoring. She was named to the 2018–19 Canada West First All-Star Team, the third year in a row that she had been named to an all-star team.

After graduating, she left North America to sign her first professional contract with Modo Hockey in Sweden. Her first SDHL goal came on 22 September 2019 in a 3–2 loss to AIK IF. She scored 7 points in 26 games in her rookie professional season, stepping up as one of the top defenders on the club. She scored twice as Modo managed to save their SDHL place in the two-game relegation playoffs series against Damettan club Skellefteå AIK. She was named an alternate captain for the club ahead of the 2020–21 season, and after 12 games, had already surpassed her previous season point totals.

== International career ==
Rieder represented Canada in the women's ice hockey tournament at the 2017 Winter Universiade, winning a silver medal.

== Personal life ==
Rieder has a degree in Environmental Studies.
