= Gracie Gilkyson =

Canadian ice hockey player (born 2003)

- Born: March 4, 2003 (age 23) Calgary, Alberta, Canada
- Height: 5 ft 7 in (170 cm)
- Position: Defence
- Shoots: Left
- PWHL team Former teams: Seattle Torrent; Yale Bulldogs (ECAC)
- Playing career: 2022–present

Gracie Gilkyson (born March 4, 2003) is a Canadian professional ice hockey defenceman for the Seattle Torrent of the Professional Women's Hockey League (PWHL). She played college ice hockey at Yale.

== Playing career ==
=== College ===
DiAntonio began her college ice hockey career for Yale during the 2022–23 season. During her freshman year, she recorded five assists in 24games. During the 2023–24 season, in her sophomore year, she recorded six goals and nine assists in 32 games. During the 2024–25 season, her junior year, she recorded four goals and seven assists in 31 games. During the 2025–26 season, in her senior year, she recorded a career-high nine goals and 18 assists in 36 games. She led the team with 59 blocked shots. Following the season she was named to the All-ECAC Third team, and Second Team All-Ivy.

=== Professional ===
On June 17, 2026, Gilkyson was drafted in the fifth round, 50th overall, by the Seattle Torrent in the 2026 PWHL Draft. She was among four Bulldogs graduates selected in the PWHL Draft, including Carina DiAntonio, Jordan Ray and Naomi Boucher. This marked the first PWHL Draft in which Yale had multiple players selected.

== Career statistics ==
			Regular season					Playoffs
Season	Team	League	GP	G	A	Pts	PIM	GP	G	A	Pts	PIM
2022–23	Yale University	ECAC	24	0	5	5	8	—	—	—	—	—
2023–24	Yale University	ECAC	32	6	9	15	10	—	—	—	—	—
2024–25	Yale University	ECAC	31	4	7	11	37	—	—	—	—	—
2025–26	Yale University	ECAC	36	9	18	27	16	—	—	—	—	—
NCAA totals			123	19	39	58	71	—	—	—	—	—
