= Maya Labad =

Canadian ice hockey player (born 2002)

- Born: May 7, 2002 (age 24) Mascouche, Quebec, Canada
- Height: 5 ft 7 in (170 cm)
- Position: Forward
- Shoots: Left
- PWHL team: Montreal Victoire
- Playing career: 2025–present

Maya Labad (born May 7, 2002) is a Canadian professional ice hockey forward for the Montreal Victoire of the Professional Women's Hockey League (PWHL). She played college ice hockey for the Quinnipiac Bobcats from 2021 to 2025, finishing fifth on the programme’s all-time goals list with 51.

== Early life ==
Labad is from Mascouche, Quebec. She played in Quebec’s women’s collegiate circuit before the NCAA, including time with the John Abbott College Islanders. In national competition, she represented Quebec at the National Women’s Under-18 Championship in 2019, winning bronze.

== Playing career ==
=== College ===
Labad joined Quinnipiac for the 2021–22 season. Across four NCAA seasons (2021–2025), she recorded 51 goals and 46 assists for 97 points in 147 games, including team-leading goal totals in 2022–23 and 2024–25. In her final season, she reached the 50-goal milestone and recorded her first collegiate hat trick (against Syracuse on October 19, 2024).

=== Professional ===
Labad was selected by Montréal in the fifth round (36th overall) of the 2025 PWHL Draft. After training camp, she initially signed as a reserve player for the Victoire. On November 23, 2025, Montréal signed her to a Standard Player Agreement after injuries created a roster opening.

Labad made her PWHL debut on December 17, 2025, scoring her first professional goal in a Takeover Tour game in Halifax against Toronto.

== International play ==
Medal record

Representing Canada

Ice hockey

World U18 Championship
Silver medal – second place	2020 Slovakia	

Labad represented the Canada U18 at the 2020 IIHF World Women's U18 Championship in Slovakia, winning a silver medal. She registered an assist against Russia on December 28, 2019.

== Career statistics ==
=== Regular season and playoffs ===
			Regular season					Playoffs
Season	Team	League	GP	G	A	Pts	PIM	GP	G	A	Pts	PIM
2021–22	Quinnipiac	ECAC	38	7	6	13	8	—	—	—	—	—
2022–23	Quinnipiac	ECAC	39	16	14	30	20	—	—	—	—	—
2023–24	Quinnipiac	ECAC	32	13	14	27	20	—	—	—	—	—
2024–25	Quinnipiac	ECAC	38	15	12	27	8	—	—	—	—	—
NCAA totals			147	51	46	97	56	—	—	—	—	—
2025–26	Montreal Victoire	PWHL	6	1	0	1	4	—	—	—	—	—
Career totals			151	52	46	98	60	—	—	—	—	—

Sources: College Hockey Inc.; HockeyDB.

== Awards and honours ==
Honour	Year
College
ECAC Hockey All-Academic Team	2023, 2025
AHCA Krampade All-American Scholar	2025
