= 2026 Walter Cup Finals =

Women's hockey championship series

	1	2	3	4	Total
Montreal Victoire	3*	2*	1	4	3
Ottawa Charge	2*	1*	2	0	1
- Location(s): Laval: Place Bell (1, 2); Kanata (Ottawa): Canadian Tire Centre (3, 4)
- Format: Best-of-five
- Coaches: Montreal: Kori Cheverie; Ottawa: Carla MacLeod
- Captains: Montreal: Marie-Philip Poulin; Ottawa: Brianne Jenner
- Dates: May 14–May 20, 2026
- MVP: Marie-Philip Poulin (Montreal Victoire)
- Series-winning goal: Abby Roque
- Networks: Canada: (English): TSN (French): RDS; United States: (English): Ion Television

The 2026 Walter Cup Finals was the championship series of the Professional Women's Hockey League 2025–26 PWHL season and the culmination of the 2026 Walter Cup playoffs. The winners of the semifinals, the Ottawa Charge and the Montreal Victoire competed in a best-of-five series to determine the league's champion and winner of the Walter Cup. The Victoire defeated the Charge in four games to win their first Walter Cup.

The series began on May 14. The Victoire had home-ice advantage in the series as the team with the better regular season record. Montreal finished the season in first place with 62 points, while Ottawa finished fourth with 44 points. Montreal chose to play the third ranked Minnesota Frost in the semifinal instead of Ottawa, who beat the second seeded Boston Fleet in their semifinal.

This was the first all-Canadian final in PWHL history, and the first to not include Minnesota, who won the previous two championships. It was also the first finals with both teams having a female head coach. It was the second straight year that the Charge made it to the final and was the first appearance for the Victoire. Montreal won three of the four regular season matchups, with Ottawa winning the other game in overtime.

The Charge and Victoire previously met in the semifinals of 2025 playoffs, with the Charge beating the Victoire in four games.

== Paths to the Finals ==
=== Montreal Victoire ===
This was Montreal's first Finals appearance, having lost in the semifinals in their previous two seasons.

The Victoire finished the regular season with 62 points, with a record 16 regulation wins, 6 overtime wins, 2 overtime losses and 6 regulation losses. This was good enough for first place in the league's standings, earning them the right to choose their playoff opponent in the semifinals. The Victoire chose the third placed Minnesota Frost, who they went on to beat three games to two, qualifying Montreal for the Finals. It was the first time in the league's history that the top seed won a playoff series.

=== Ottawa Charge ===
The Charge finished the season with 44 points, with a record of 9 regulation wins, 8 overtime wins, 1 overtime loss and 12 regulation losses. This earned them fourth place in the regular season standings. The team earned their playoff spot in their final regular season game against the Toronto Sceptres, who they beat 3–0.

With Montreal opting to play Minnesota in their semifinal match-up, this left the Charge to play the second placed Boston Fleet. The Charge went on to upset the Fleet in four games.

== Game summaries ==
=== Game one ===
After a scoreless first period, Ottawa took a 1–0 lead when Rebecca Leslie shot from the slot, and scored on the rebound after Ann-Renée Desbiens made the initial save. Montreal tied it up at the 12:12 mark of the third when Abby Roque scored her first career playoff goal. Eight minutes later, Ottawa took a 2–1 lead when Leslie scored her second of the game, with just 4:04 remaining in the third. With just 2.1 seconds left, after Laura Stacey left the ice following a collision with Ottawa's Gabbie Hughes, Montreal's Nicole Gosling tied the game up at 2 to send the game to overtime. At the 2:29 mark in the extra frame, Roque scored the game winner via a bounce off her helmet to win game one for the Victoire.

May 14	Ottawa Charge	2–3	OT	Montreal Victoire	Place Bell	Recap

Scoring summary
Period	Team	Goal	Assist(s)	Time	Score
1st	None				
2nd	OTT	Rebecca Leslie (2)	Unassisted	16:56	1–0 OTT
3rd	MTL	Abby Roque (1)	Nadia Mattivi (1) and Laura Stacey (2)	12:12	1–1
3rd	OTT	Rebecca Leslie (3)	Sarah Wozniewicz (1)	15:56	2–1 OTT
3rd	MTL	Nicole Gosling (1)	Maureen Murphy (1) and Marie-Philip Poulin (4)	19:57	2–2
OT	MTL	Abby Roque (2)	Laura Stacey (3) and Maggie Flaherty (1)	02:29	3–2 MTL

Penalty summary
Period	Team	Player	Penalty	Time	PIM
1st	MTL	Abby Roque	Slashing	04:33	2:00
2nd	OTT	Jocelyne Larocque	Hooking	04:30	2:00
2nd	MTL	Dara Greig	High-sticking	12:59	2:00
2nd	OTT	Brianne Jenner	Hooking	04:30	2:00
3rd	OTT	Ronja Savolainen	Boarding	00:42	2:00
OT	None				

Shots by period
Team	1	2	3	OT	Total
OTT	10	8	7	0	25
MTL	5	8	11	2	26

Power play opportunities
Team	Goals/Opportunities
Ottawa	0/2
Montreal	0/3

Three star selections
	Team	Player	Statistics
1st	MTL	Abby Roque	2 goals
2nd	MTL	Laura Stacey	2 assists
3rd	OTT	Rebecca Leslie	2 goals

=== Game two ===
Sarah Wozniewicz scored the game's opening goal for the Charge in the first period on the team's first opportunity, after going without a shot in the first eight minutes. Montreal's Kati Tabin tied the game up just 32 seconds into the second period. In overtime, with all five Ottawa Charge players headed toward the side boards, Montreal's Marie-Philip Poulin made a pass to an open Maggie Flaherty who scored the game winner at the 14:12 mark, giving the Victoire a 2–0 series lead.

May 16	Ottawa Charge	1–2	OT	Montreal Victoire	Place Bell	Recap

Scoring summary
Period	Team	Goal	Assist(s)	Time	Score
1st	OTT	Sarah Wozniewicz (2)	Unassisted	08:38	1–0 OTT
2nd	MTL	Kati Tabin (1)	Unassisted	00:32	1–1
3rd	None				
OT	MTL	Maggie Flaherty (2)	Marie-Philip Poulin (5) and Abby Roque (4)	14:12	2–1 MTL

Penalty summary
Period	Team	Player	Penalty	Time	PIM
1st	MTL	Marie-Philip Poulin	Hooking	11:51	2:00
2nd	OTT	Emily Clark	Cross-checking	00:27	2:00
2nd	MTL	Laura Stacey	Unsportsmanlike conduct	00:27	2:00
3rd	OTT	Rory Guilday	Interference	05:55	2:00
3rd	MTL	Nadia Mattivi	Cross-checking	08:46	2:00
OT	None				

Shots by period
Team	1	2	3	OT	Total
OTT	5	6	5	5	21
MTL	11	4	8	6	29

Power play opportunities
Team	Goals/Opportunities
Ottawa	0/2
Montreal	0/1

Three star selections
	Team	Player	Statistics
1st	MTL	Maggie Flaherty	1 goal
2nd	MTL	Kati Tabin	1 goal
3rd	OTT	Sarah Wozniewicz	1 goal

=== Game three ===
Down two games to none, the Ottawa Charge were facing elimination upon their return to Ottawa for Game 3, played on Victoria Day in front of a PWHL playoff record 16,894 spectators. Neither of the two teams could find the back of the net until the 7:32 mark in the third period, when Montreal's Hayley Scamurra scored on Gwyneth Philips' left side thanks to a Maureen Murphy point shot that went off the back boards. Ottawa tied it up seven minutes later when Peyton Hemp scored at the 14:30 mark, getting a rebound and shooting the puck to the top-corner above Ann-Renée Desbiens' glove. With just 56 seconds left in regulation, the Charge's Rebecca Leslie scored the game's winning goal, when she got a rebound from Sarah Wozniewicz and scored through traffic. After a lengthy review due to a possible hand pass by Brianne Jenner, the goal was considered good, and the Charge won the game 2–1.

May 18	Montreal Victoire	1–2	Ottawa Charge	Canadian Tire Centre	Recap

Scoring summary
Period	Team	Goal	Assist(s)	Time	Score
1st	None				
2nd	None				
3rd	MTL	Hayley Scamurra (2)	Maureen Murphy (2)	07:32	1–0 MTL
3rd	OTT	Peyton Hemp (1)	Gabbie Hughes (1) and Ronja Savolainen (2)	14:30	1–1
3rd	OTT	Rebecca Leslie (4)	Sarah Wozniewicz (2)	19:04	2–1 OTT

Penalty summary
Period	Team	Player	Penalty	Time	PIM
1st	OTT	Emma Greco	Tripping	13:02	2:00
1st	OTT	Rebecca Leslie	Cross-checking	15:42	2:00
1st	MTL	Maureen Murphy	Delay of game	19:53	2:00
2nd	MTL	Laura Stacey	Hooking	00:24	2:00
2nd	MTL	Marie-Philip Poulin	Hooking	18:58	2:00
3rd	OTT	Brooke Hobson	Holding	05:28	2:00

Shots by period
Team	1	2	3	Total
MTL	9	6	13	28
OTT	10	8	10	28

Power play opportunities
Team	Goals/Opportunities
Montreal	0/3
Ottawa	0/3

Three star selections
	Team	Player	Statistics
1st	OTT	Rebecca Leslie	1 goal
2nd	OTT	Gwyneth Philips	27 saves
3rd	OTT	Peyton Hemp	1 goal

=== Game four ===
With Montreal holding the series lead at 2-1, the Victoire looked to clinch the Walter Cup in Game 4 at the Canadian Tire Centre. After a scoreless first period, Montreal's Abby Roque gave her team the lead with a goal that bounced off Charge defender Rory Guilday's stick and past Gwyneth Philips at 3:49 in the second. At 9:58 in the third period, Roque doubled Montreal's lead on a breakaway, netting a shorthanded goal while captain Marie-Philip Poulin was in the penalty box for goaltender interference. At 13:54, Maggie Flaherty shot through traffic from the blue line to bring the score to 3-0. Montreal's Lina Ljungblom sealed the Victoire's 4-0 win with a goal at 15:44, off a turnover near Ottawa's net. Ann-Renée Desbiens stopped all 23 shots she faced to record her second shutout of the postseason. This was Ottawa's second straight loss in the Walter Cup finals, while Montreal's win made them the first Canadian team to hoist the Walter Cup, and the first team other than the Minnesota Frost to win the title. Poulin, whose 8 points in the playoffs tied her for the postseason lead, was named playoff MVP, despite playing with a torn ACL and meniscus.

May 20	Montreal Victoire	4–0	Ottawa Charge	Canadian Tire Centre	Recap

Scoring summary
Period	Team	Goal	Assist(s)	Time	Score
1st	None				
2nd	MTL	Abby Roque (3)	Marie-Philip Poulin (6) and Laura Stacey (4)	03:49	1–0 MTL
3rd	MTL	Abby Roque (4) – sh	Unassisted	09:58	2–0 MTL
3rd	MTL	Maggie Flaherty (3)	Jessica DiGirolamo (1) and Dara Greig (1)	13:54	3–0 MTL
3rd	MTL	Lina Ljungblom (1)	Unassisted	15:44	4–0 MTL

Penalty summary
Period	Team	Player	Penalty	Time	PIM
1st	MTL	Nadia Mattivi	Boarding	15:02	2:00
2nd	MTL	Kati Tabin	Slashing	06:38	2:00
3rd	MTL	Marie-Philip Poulin	Goaltender interference	08:11	2:00

Shots by period
Team	1	2	3	Total
MTL	6	6	4	16
OTT	5	5	13	23

Power play opportunities
Team	Goals/Opportunities
Montreal	0/0
Ottawa	0/3

Three star selections
	Team	Player	Statistics
1st	MTL	Abby Roque	2 goals
2nd	MTL	Ann-Renée Desbiens	23 saves, 1.000 SV%
3rd	MTL	Laura Stacey	1 assist

== Team rosters ==
=== Montreal Victoire ===
No.	Nat	Player	Pos	S/G	Age	Acquired	Birthplace
30	(Germany)	Sandra Abstreiter	G	L	27	2024	Freising, Germany
23	(Canada)	Erin Ambrose (A)	D	R	32	2024	Keswick, Ontario
44	(United States)	Amanda Boulier	D	R	33	2024	Watertown, Connecticut
27	(United States)	Shiann Darkangelo	F	L	32	2025	Brighton, Michigan
35	(Canada)	Ann-Renée Desbiens	G	L	32	2023	La Malbaie, Quebec
22	(Canada)	Jessica DiGirolamo	D	R	27	2025	Mississauga, Ontario
77	(Canada)	Jade Downie-Landry	F	L	30	2025	Saint-Jean-sur-Richelieu, Quebec
28	(Canada)	Catherine Dubois	F	L	30	2024	Charlesbourg, Quebec
91	(United States)	Maggie Flaherty	D	L	26	2025	Lakeville, Minnesota
61	(Canada)	Nicole Gosling	D	L	24	2025	London, Ontario
17	(Canada)	Dara Greig	F	L	25	2024	Camden, New Jersey
88	(United States)	Skylar Irving	F	R	24	2025	Kingston, Massachusetts
13	(Canada)	Alexandra Labelle	F	L	30	2024	Saint-Louis-de-Gonzague, Quebec
25	(Sweden)	Lina Ljungblom	F	L	24	2024	Skövde, Sweden
93	(Italy)	Nadia Mattivi	D	L	26	2026	Baselga di Piné, Italy
96	(Czech Republic)	Natálie Mlýnková	F	L	25	2025	Zlín, Czech Republic
21	(United States)	Maureen Murphy	F	R	26	2023	Buffalo, New York
29	(Canada)	Marie-Philip Poulin (C)	F	L	35	2023	Beauceville, Quebec
11	(United States)	Abby Roque	F	R	28	2025	Sault Ste. Marie, Michigan
16	(United States)	Hayley Scamurra	F	L	31	2025	Buffalo, New York
7	(Canada)	Laura Stacey (A)	F	R	32	2023	Mississauga, Ontario
9	(Canada)	Kati Tabin	D	L	29	2023	Winnipeg, Manitoba
1	(Canada)	Megan Warrener	G	L	23	2025	Stoney Creek, Ontario
19	(Canada)	Kaitlin Willoughby	F	R	31	2025	Prince Albert, Saskatchewan

=== Ottawa Charge ===
No.	Nat	Player	Pos	S/G	Age	Acquired	Birthplace
1	(Finland)	Sanni Ahola	G	L	26	2025	Helsinki, Finland
86	(Canada)	Michela Cava	F	R	32	2025	Thunder Bay, Ontario
26	(Canada)	Emily Clark (A)	F	L	30	2023	Saskatoon, Saskatchewan
25	(Canada)	Emma Greco	D	L	31	2026	Burlington, Ontario
5	(United States)	Rory Guilday	D	L	23	2025	Chanhassen, Minnesota
29	(United States)	Peyton Hemp	F	R	23	2025	Andover, Minnesota
11	(Canada)	Brooke Hobson	D	L	27	2025	Prince Albert, Saskatchewan
22	(United States)	Taylor House	F	L	27	2024	Joliet, Illinois
17	(United States)	Gabbie Hughes	F	L	26	2023	Lino Lakes, Minnesota
19	(Canada)	Brianne Jenner (C)	F	R	35	2023	Oakville, Ontario
71	(Russia)	Fanuza Kadirova	F	L	28	2025	Kukmor, Russia
3	(Canada)	Jocelyne Larocque (A)	D	L	38	2024	Ste. Anne, Manitoba
37	(Canada)	Rebecca Leslie	F	R	30	2024	Ottawa, Ontario
6	(Canada)	Stephanie Markowski	D	R	24	2024	Edmonton, Alberta
27	(Canada)	Brooke McQuigge	F	L	26	2026	Bowmanville, Ontario
16	(Czech Republic)	Kateřina Mrázová	F	L	33	2023	Kolín, Czech and Slovak Federative Republic
33	(United States)	Gwyneth Philips	G	R	25	2024	Athens, Ohio
88	(Finland)	Ronja Savolainen	D	L	28	2024	Helsinki, Finland
10	(Canada)	Alexa Vasko	F	L	27	2024	St. Catharines, Ontario
14	(Canada)	Olivia Wallin	F	R	24	2026	Oakville, Ontario
70	(Canada)	Kendra Woodland	G	L	26	2025	Kamloops, British Columbia
23	(Canada)	Sarah Wozniewicz	F	R	22	2025	Cochrane, Alberta
