= Georgia Schiff =

American ice hockey player (born 2004)

- Born: March 27, 2004 (age 22) Montpelier, Vermont, U.S.
- Height: 5 ft 9 in (175 cm)
- Position: Forward
- Shoots: Left
- PWHL team: Detroit Clutch
- Playing career: 2022–present

Georgia Schiff (born March 27, 2004) is an American professional ice hockey forward for the Detroit Clutch of the Professional Women's Hockey League (PWHL). She played college ice hockey at Cornell.

== Early life ==
Schiff was born to Roy Schiff and Elise Annes and has an older sister. She played ice hockey at the North American Hockey Academy while enrolled at Montepelier High School. She played boys hockey until mid-way through her junior year of high school. She also played soccer and tennis, and was a two-time all-league honoree in soccer. She won a state tennis title in 2021.

== Playing career ==
=== College ===
Schiff began her college ice hockey career for Cornell during the 2022–23 season. In her freshman year, she recorded five goals and six assists in 25 games. During the 2023–24 season, in her sophomore year, she recorded eight goals and seven assists in 33 games. During the 2024–25 season, in her junior year, she recorded three goals and four assists in 34 games. During the 2025–26 season, in her senior year, she recorded a career-high 12 goals and 16 assists in 33 games. She ranked second on the team in points, and tied for the team lead in goals. Following the season she earned Second Team All-Ivy honors.

=== Professional ===
On June 17, 2026, Schiff was drafted in the sixth round, 63rd overall, by the Detroit Clutch in the 2026 PWHL Draft.

== Career statistics ==
			Regular season					Playoffs
Season	Team	League	GP	G	A	Pts	PIM	GP	G	A	Pts	PIM
2022–23	Cornell University	ECAC	25	5	6	11	8	—	—	—	—	—
2023–24	Cornell University	ECAC	32	8	7	15	6	—	—	—	—	—
2024–25	Cornell University	ECAC	34	3	4	7	10	—	—	—	—	—
2025–26	Cornell University	ECAC	33	12	16	28	6	—	—	—	—	—
NCAA totals			124	28	33	61	30	—	—	—	—	—
