= Erin Ambrose =

Canadian ice hockey player (born 1994)

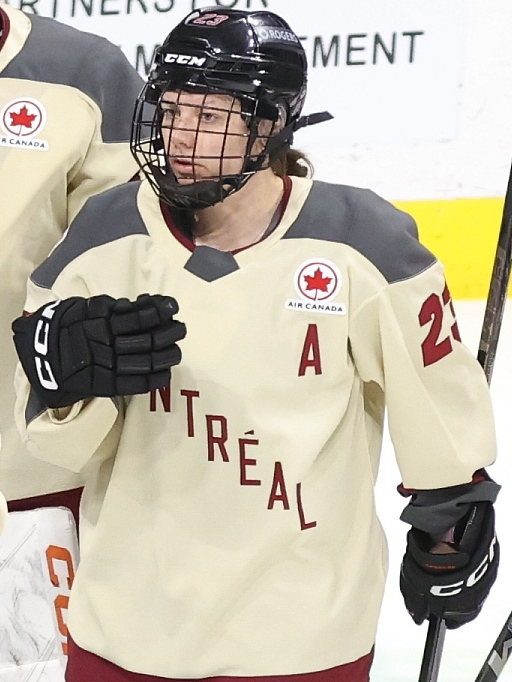
- Ambrose with the Montreal Victoire in 2024
- Born: April 30, 1994 (age 32) Keswick, Ontario, Canada
- Height: 5 ft 5 in (165 cm)
- Weight: 132 lb (60 kg; 9 st 6 lb)
- Position: Defence
- Shoots: Right
- PWHL team Former teams: Vegas Vanguards; Les Canadiennes de Montréal; Clarkson Golden Knights; Toronto Furies; Montreal Victoire
- National team: Canada
- Playing career: 2012–present
Medal record
Women's ice hockey
Representing Canada
Olympic Games
Gold medal – first place	2022 Beijing	Team
Silver medal – second place	2026 Milano Cortina	Team
World Championships
Gold medal – first place	2021 Canada
Gold medal – first place	2022 Denmark
Gold medal – first place	2024 United States
Silver medal – second place	2017 United States
Silver medal – second place	2023 Canada
Silver medal – second place	2025 Czechia
Silver medal – second place	2026 Denmark
Bronze medal – third place	2019 Finland
World U18 Championships
Gold medal – first place	2010 United States
Gold medal – first place	2012 Czech Republic
Silver medal – second place	2011 Sweden

Erin Ambrose (born April 30, 1994) is a Canadian professional ice hockey player who is a defender and captain for the Vegas Vanguards of the Professional Women's Hockey League (PWHL). She is also a member of the Canada women's national ice hockey team. She made her debut with the Canada women's national ice hockey team at the 2014 4 Nations Cup.

== Playing career ==
At the age of 11, Ambrose moved from AA to AAA boys hockey, and in her second season, she was named team captain. She began to play women's ice hockey as a 14-year-old in 2008. She competed for Ontario Blue at the 2008 National Women's Under-18 Championship and participated in all five games. Ontario Blue had a fourth-place finish at the tournament in Napanee, Ont. In 2009, she was invited to Canada's National Women's Under-18 Team. She was one of seven defenders named to the final roster, making her the second 15-year-old (after teammate Kaleigh Fratkin) to suit up for the under-18 squad. On February 19, 2012, Ambrose became the all-time scoring leader among defenders in Provincial Women's Hockey League history. She recorded a three-point game versus the Mississauga Jr. Chiefs to surpass Laura Fortino.

=== College ===
On January 16, 2012, it was announced that Ambrose committed to join the Clarkson Golden Knights women's ice hockey program in autumn 2012. Ambrose was the leading rookie scorer among all defenders in the NCAA, recording 36 points. Her 30 assists were a program record, while her 1.06 points per game made her one of only three blueliners in NCAA points to average at least one point per game.

To begin her sophomore season, Ambrose amassed five and four-point performances, including hat tricks in consecutive games. Such performances took place against the RIT Tigers and St. Lawrence Skating Saints. She finished the season as the co-winner of ECAC Hockey's Best Defensive Defenseman Award.

Serving as an assistant captain in her junior and senior seasons, the junior season was highlighted by recording the 100th point of her career with the Golden Knights. Becoming the ninth player in program history to reach the century club, she achieved the feat on January 10, 2015, scoring a goal in a 1–1 draw versus conference rival Cornell.

In her senior season, she missed the first nine games due to injury. Despite the setback, she logged 28 points on the strength of 21 assists. She scored the last goal of her NCAA career on March 5, 2016, against the Colgate Raiders. She also recorded two assists in the game for a three-point performance. In the previous game (a February 27 tilt with the Cornell Big Red), Ambrose recorded four assists, her best offensive output for the season.

=== NWHL ===
In the 2015 NWHL Draft, she was selected by the New York Riveters, but never played a game in the league.

=== CWHL ===
After being released from Hockey Canada's Centralization camp, Ambrose was traded from the Toronto Furies to Les Canadiennes de Montreal. Taking place on December 13, 2017, the Furies received first, and third-round picks in the 2018 CWHL Draft, a first-round pick from the 2019 CWHL Draft, plus a third-round pick from the 2020 CWHL Draft.

Making her debut with Les Canadiennes on December 16, she recorded a pair of assists, including an assist on the overtime winner by Kayla Tutino, a 5–4 win versus the Markham Thunder.

With Les Canadiennes, Ambrose appeared in the 2019 Clarkson Cup, challenging the Calgary Inferno. Ambrose gained an assist in the game, a 5–2 loss to Calgary.

=== PWHL ===
On September 18, 2023, Ambrose was drafted in the first round, sixth overall, by PWHL Montreal in the 2023 PWHL Draft. She was the fourth player to be protected by Montreal in the 2025 Expansion Draft, after the new teams signed two players from the Victoire. Previously, her teammates Ann-Renée Desbiens, Marie-Philip Poulin, and Laura Stacey were protected first.

During the 2025–26 season, she recorded six assists in 21 regular season games and two assists in nine games during the 2026 Walter Cup playoffs, to help the Victoire win the Walter Cup.

During the league's expansion to 12 teams ahead of the 2026–27 season, she was left unprotected by the Victoire and signed a two-year contract with the Vegas Vanguards on June 8, 2026. On November 20, 2026, Ambrose was announced as the first serving captain of the Vanguards.

== International play ==
Ambrose was part of Canada's National Women's Under-18 Team to a gold medal at the 2010 IIHF World Women's Under-18 Championship in Chicago. As a member of the gold medal-winning squad, a hockey card of her was featured in the Upper Deck 2010 World of Sports card series. In addition, she participated in the Canada Celebrates Event on June 30 in Edmonton, Alberta which recognized the Canadian Olympic and World hockey champions from the 2009–10 season .

During the 2011–12 Canada women's national ice hockey team season, she was a member of the Canadian National Under 18 team that participated in a three-game series vs. the US in August 2011. In addition, she was named the team captain. She was part of the gold medal-winning Team Ontario Red squad at the 2011 Canadian National Women's Under-18 Championships In the second game of the 2012 IIHF World Women's U18 Championship (contested on January 1, 2012), Erin Ambrose earned two points in a 6–0 shutout of Germany.

On January 11, 2022, Ambrose was named to Canada's 2022 Olympic team.

On January 9, 2026, she was named to Canada's roster to compete at the 2026 Winter Olympics.

== Career statistics ==
=== Regular season and playoffs ===
			Regular season					Playoffs
Season	Team	League	GP	G	A	Pts	PIM	GP	G	A	Pts	PIM
2008–09	Toronto Jr. Aeros	Prov. WHL	26	1	7	8	8	8	1	1	2	6
2009–10	Toronto Jr. Aeros	Prov. WHL	38	4	19	23	10	7	3	3	6	0
2010–11	Toronto Jr. Aeros	Prov. WHL	32	7	21	28	20	7	3	5	8	2
2011–12	Toronto Jr. Aeros	Prov. WHL	29	7	22	29	6	10	1	8	9	4
2012–13	Clarkson Golden Knights	NCAA	34	6	30	36	18	—	—	—	—	—
2013–14	Clarkson Golden Knights	NCAA	37	14	36	50	22	—	—	—	—	—
2014–15	Clarkson Golden Knights	NCAA	31	6	17	23	18	—	—	—	—	—
2015–16	Clarkson Golden Knights	NCAA	30	7	21	28	18	—	—	—	—	—
2016–17	Toronto Furies	CWHL	17	0	8	8	8	—	—	—	—	—
2017–18	Montréal Canadiennes	CWHL	16	2	12	14	10	2	0	1	1	0
2018–19	Montréal Canadiennes	CWHL	26	6	18	24	20	2	0	1	1	2
2019–20	Montréal	PWHPA	—	—	—	—	—	—	—	—	—	—
2020–21	Team Bauer	PWHPA	4	1	3	4	2	—	—	—	—	—
2022–23	Team Sonnet	PWHPA	16	2	3	5	6	—	—	—	—	—
2023–24	PWHL Montreal	PWHL	24	4	14	18	4	3	0	2	2	0
2024–25	Montréal Victoire	PWHL	28	0	13	13	4	4	0	1	1	0
2025–26	Montréal Victoire	PWHL	21	0	6	6	2	9	0	2	2	2
PWHL totals			73	4	33	37	10	16	0	5	5	2

=== International ===
Year	Team	Event	Result	GP	G	A	Pts	PIM
2010	Canada	U18	1st place, gold medalist(s)	5	0	9	9	0
2011	Canada	U18	2nd place, silver medalist(s)	5	0	2	2	4
2012	Canada	U18	1st place, gold medalist(s)	5	2	3	5	0
2017	Canada	WC	2nd place, silver medalist(s)	5	1	1	2	4
2019	Canada	WC	3rd place, bronze medalist(s)	7	2	5	7	6
2021	Canada	WC	1st place, gold medalist(s)	7	2	3	5	2
2022	Canada	OG	1st place, gold medalist(s)	7	4	5	9	2
2022	Canada	WC	1st place, gold medalist(s)	6	1	2	3	0
2023	Canada	WC	2nd place, silver medalist(s)	7	0	7	7	0
2024	Canada	WC	1st place, gold medalist(s)	7	1	1	2	0
2025	Canada	WC	2nd place, silver medalist(s)	7	1	2	3	0
2026	Canada	OG	2nd place, silver medalist(s)	7	0	2	2	0
Junior totals				15	2	14	16	4
Senior totals				60	12	28	40	14

Sources: Elite Prospects and the NHL.

== Awards and honours ==
- Directorate Award, Best Defender, 2012 IIHF World Women's U18 Championship.

=== NCAA ===
- ECAC Rookie of the Week (Week of October 23, 2012)
- 2013 ECAC Hockey Rookie of the Year
- 2013 Second-Team ECAC All-Star
- 2013 All-USCHO.com All-Star team
- 2014 First-Team All-American
- 2014 Top 10 Patty Kazmaier Memorial Award finalist
- 2015 ECAC Hockey Third-Team All-League
- 2016 First-Team ECAC Hockey All-Star
- 2016, Finalist for ECAC Hockey Best Defenseman Award
- 2016 ECAC Hockey All-Tournament team

=== CWHL ===
- 2018–19, CWHL Defender of the Year

=== PWHL ===
- 2023–24, PWHL Defender of the Year
- 2023–24 First Team All-Star
- Walter Cup champion (2026)

== Personal life ==
In October 2020, Ambrose wrote a piece for Hockey Canada detailing her struggles with depression and anxiety, also revealing her queer identity. In December 2020, she pledged to donate her brain to science for concussion research after her death.
