= Everest Collegiate High School and Academy =

Location
- 5935 Clarkston Road; Clarkston, Michigan 48348; United States; 42°45′2″N 83°23′36″W

Information
- Type: Private
- Motto: Semper Altius (Always Higher)
- Religious affiliation: Roman Catholic
- Established: 1991 (High School); 2008 (Academy)
- Founder: Lorenzo Gómez LC
- President: Mike Nalepa
- Principal: Gregory Reichert; Diana Diffenderfer
- Chaplain: Fr. Thomas Salazar
- Grades: PK-12
- Enrollment: 111 (High School) (Fall 2016)
  - Grade 9: 27
  - Grade 10: 28
  - Grade 11: 34
  - Grade 12: 22
- Campus: Four buildings
- Campus size: 90 acres (360,000 m^{2})
- Campus type: Suburban
- Colors: Black and Gold
- Fight song: Go, Everest!
- Athletics conference: Catholic High School League (CHSL)
- Team name: Mountaineers
- Accreditation: K-8: M.N.S.A.A.; 9-12
- Publication: The Mountaineer
- Website: www.everestcatholic.org

Everest Collegiate High School and Academy is a private, Roman Catholic PK-12 college-preparatory school offering co-ed education for pre-school through grade 2, and gender-specific education for grades 3 to high school on a 90-acre (360,000 m^{2}) campus, in Independence Township, Michigan, United States, near Clarkston. The high school opened to 9th grade students in 2008 and students can enroll in 3 year old pre-school through 12th grade for the 2017–2018 school year. It is located within the Roman Catholic Archdiocese of Detroit.

In 2012 and 2014, it was named one of the top 50 Catholic High Schools by the Cardinal Newman Society. In 2016, it was named a National Blue Ribbon School by the U.S. Department of Education in the Exemplary High Performing Schools category.

== Curriculum and affiliation ==
Founded by father Lorenzo Gómez LC, Everest Collegiate High School and Academy is a formula developed by the Legion of Christ, a religious congregation of the Roman Catholic Church. The four pillars of this model include a challenging academic curriculum, character development, spiritual formation, and apostolic projects.

Everest has two sister schools: Pinecrest Academy (Atlanta) and The Highlands School (Dallas).

== Everest Schools ==
The Everest Schools are made up of the following:

- Pre-Kindergarten: 3 & 4 year old Pre-School and Junior Kindergarten
- Lower Elementary School: Kindergarten, Grades 1–2
- Upper Elementary School: Grades 3–5
- Middle School: Grades 6–8
- High School: Grades 9–12

== International Program ==
Everest Academy has an International Students Program where students from 6th to 12th grade reside and study for at least one year. There is an average of 10 international students per grade from 6th to 8th grade. In total there are an average of 45 international students per school year.

Students at Everest Academy get to know the international students and are at school with them, while international students get to know American culture and the American students.

The International Students Program is affiliated with Oak International but compared to the other academies in the same organization this one includes the experience of going to an American school. The other academies are all-international students schools.

== State championships ==
Boys' Golf: 2016, 2017

In June 2016, Everest Collegiate won its first MHSAA state championship in boys' golf.

In June 2017, the Everest Collegiate boys' golf team repeated as MHSAA Division 4 state champions at Michigan State University's Forest Akers East Golf Course.

In September 2025, student Christian Knowlson won the team the MHSAA state championship in boys' golf.
