= Zoe Uens =

Canadian ice hockey player (born 2003)

- Born: November 12, 2003 (age 22) Belleville, Ontario, Canada
- Height: 5 ft 10 in (178 cm)
- Position: Defence
- Shoots: Left
- PWHL team: Montreal Victoire
- Playing career: 2022–present

Zoe Uens (born November 12, 2003) is a Canadian professional ice hockey defenceman for the Montreal Victoire of the Professional Women's Hockey League (PWHL). She played college ice hockey at Quinnipiac.

== Playing career ==
=== College ===
Uens began her college ice hockey career for Quinnipiac during the 2022–23 season. During her freshman year she recorded one goal and two assists in 39 games. During the 2023–24 season, in her sophomore year, she recorded one goals and ten assists in 37 games. During the 2024–25 season, in her junior year, she recorded two goals and eight assists in 38 games, and led the team with 65 blocked shots. During the 2025–26 season, in her senior year, she recorded a career-high ten goals goals and nine assists in 41 games. She ranked second on the team with 55 blocked shots.

=== Professional ===
On June 17, 2026, Uens was drafted in the third round, 36th overall, by the Montreal Victoire in the 2026 PWHL Draft.

== Personal life ==
Uen's brother, Zach, played college ice hockey at Merrimack.

== Career statistics ==
			Regular season					Playoffs
Season	Team	League	GP	G	A	Pts	PIM	GP	G	A	Pts	PIM
2022–23	Quinnipiac University	ECAC	38	1	3	4	22	—	—	—	—	—
2023–24	Quinnipiac University	ECAC	37	1	10	11	30	—	—	—	—	—
2024–25	Quinnipiac University	ECAC	38	2	8	10	30	—	—	—	—	—
2025–26	Quinnipiac University	ECAC	41	10	9	19	44	—	—	—	—	—
NCAA totals			154	14	30	44	126	—	—	—	—	—
