= Emerson Jarvis =

- Born: Edmonton, Alberta
- Height: 5 ft 4 in (163 cm)
- Position: Forward
- PWHL team: Seattle Torrent
- Playing career: 2026–present

Emerson Jarvis is a professional ice hockey forward drafted by the Seattle Torrent of the Professional Women's Hockey League. She played her college ice hockey with Quinnipiac, and was drafted twenty sixth overall in the 2026 PWHL Draft.

== Career statistics ==
			Regular season					Playoffs
Season	Team	League	GP	G	A	Pts	PIM	GP	G	A	Pts	PIM
2022–23	Ohio State University	WCHA	20	1	2	3	2	—	—	—	—	—
2023–24	Quinnipiac University	ECAC	29	7	1	8	6	—	—	—	—	—
2024–25	Quinnipiac University	ECAC	38	7	9	16	6	—	—	—	—	—
2025–26	Quinnipiac University	ECAC	41	17	21	38	12	—	—	—	—	—
NCAA totals			128	32	33	65	26	—	—	—	—	—

== Awards and honours ==
- 2025 ECAC Hockey All-Academic
- 2025 ACHA/Krampade All-America Scholar
