= Avi Adam =

- Born: August 15, 2004 (age 21) Wolfville, Nova Scotia, Canada
- Height: 5 ft 9 in (175 cm)
- Position: Forward
- Shoots: Right
- PWHL team: Montreal Victoire
- Playing career: 2026–present

Avi Adam (born August 15, 2004) is a Canadian professional ice hockey player who is a forward for the Montreal Victoire of the Professional Women's Hockey League (PWHL). She played college ice hockey at Cornell.

== Playing career ==
=== Professional ===
On June 17, 2026, Adam was drafted in the second round, 24th overall, by the Montreal Victoire in the 2026 PWHL Draft.

== Awards and honours ==
- ECAC Third Team All-Star (2024–25)
