= Montreal Victoire =

Women's professional ice hockey team in Montreal

Montréal Victoire Victoire de Montréal (French)
- City: Laval, Quebec
- League: Professional Women's Hockey League
- Conference: Eastern
- Founded: 2023
- Home arena: Place Bell
- Colours: Burgundy, sand, storm
- Owner: Mark Walter Group
- General manager: Danièle Sauvageau
- Head coach: Kori Cheverie
- Captain: Marie-Philip Poulin
- Website: montreal.thepwhl.com

Championships
- Regular season titles: 2 (2024–25, 2025–26)
- Walter Cups: 1 (2025–26)

The Montréal Victoire (French: Victoire de Montréal) are a professional ice hockey team based in the Greater Montreal area that competes in the Professional Women's Hockey League (PWHL). They are one of the six charter franchises of the league. The team plays its home games at Place Bell in Laval, Quebec. The Victoire are the current Walter Cup champions, having won the championship in 2026.

== History ==
=== Founding and inaugural season (2023–24) ===
On August 29, 2023, it was announced that one of the PWHL's first six franchises would be located in Montreal. On September 1, Danièle Sauvageau, the one-time coach for Canada's national team, was announced as the team's general manager. Kori Cheverie, a former assistant coach with the Canadian national team and the first woman to have coached a Canadian men's hockey team, was named the team's inaugural coach on September 13. Montreal's first three players—Canadian national team members Marie-Philip Poulin, Laura Stacey, and Ann-Renée Desbiens—were signed on September 5, 2023. At the 2023 PWHL Draft on September 18, the team selected 15 players; their first pick, at sixth overall, was Canadian national team member Erin Ambrose.

The team colours were officially announced on November 14, 2023, as burgundy, "sand", and "storm". Later that month, it was revealed that the team would host the majority of its games at the Verdun Auditorium, with four games at Place Bell. On December 29, the team announced that Poulin would serve as team captain, with Stacey and Erin Ambrose serving as assistant captains.

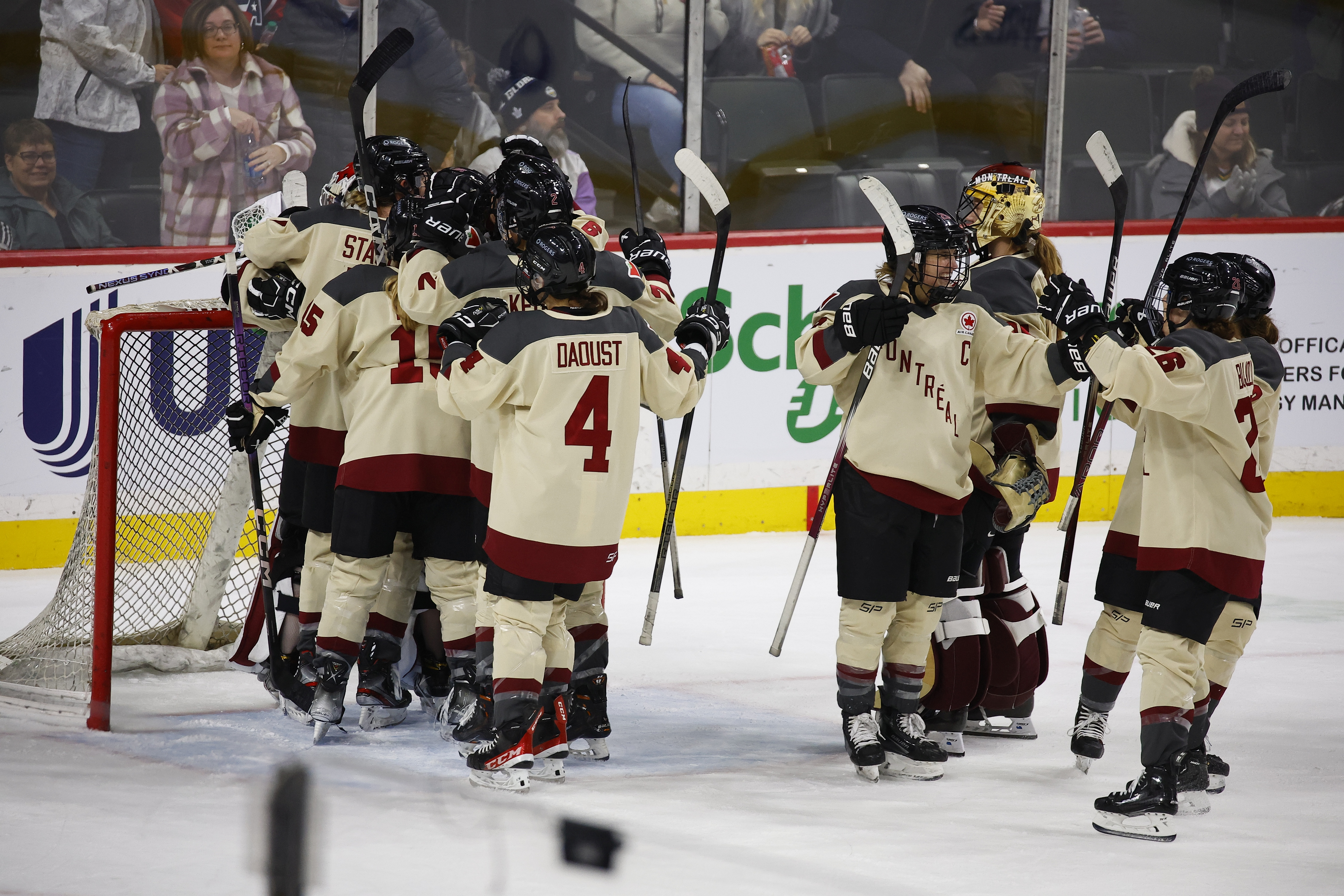
Montreal celebrating a victory over PWHL Minnesota in 2024.

Montreal's first ever game took place on January 2, 2024, against PWHL Ottawa; the 8,318 fans in attendance at Ottawa's TD Place Arena set a new attendance record for professional women's hockey. Claire Dalton scored the first goal in franchise history. Although Montreal twice trailed in the game, Ann-Sophie Bettez scored in overtime to secure the team's first win by a score of 3–2. The team hosted its first home game on January 13, with PWHL Boston securing a 3–2 overtime win in front of a sold-out crowd at Verdun Auditorium.

On February 16, 2024, Montreal played a match hosted by PWHL Toronto at Scotiabank Arena in a game dubbed "The Battle on Bay Street". The game set a league and women's hockey attendance record with a sell-out crowd of 19,285, beating the previous record of 18,013 at the 2013 IIHF Women's World Championship. Two months later, on April 20, Montréal hosted Toronto in its first-ever home match at the Bell Centre, selling out the arena and setting another new attendance record at 21,105. This game was known as "The Duel at the Top", with the two teams vying for first place in the standings. Montréal managed to draw large crowds throughout the season.

Montreal clinched a berth in the inaugural PWHL playoffs on March on April 24 with a 5–2 win over PWHL New York. They faced Boston in the first round of the playoffs, and lost three straight games in overtime—including a triple-overtime affair in the second game of the series—to get eliminated from contention. After the season, Erin Ambrose was named the league's top defender for its inaugural year.

=== Regular season titles and Walter Cup (2024–present) ===
In September 2024, the team announced that Place Bell would serve as its primary home venue for the 2024–25 season. The Victoire enjoyed success in the regular season, finishing first in the league. Team captain Marie-Philip Poulin led the league in goals, and subsequently became the first Victoire player to receive the PWHL's Billie Jean King Most Valuable Player honour. As well, the International Ice Hockey Federation named her the IIHF Female Player of the Year for her feats with both the Victoire and the Canadian national team. The Victoire faced the Ottawa Charge in the semi-finals of the Walter Cup playoffs, but were ousted in four games.

With the arrival of the PWHL's first expansion teams, the Seattle Torrent and Vancouver Goldeneyes, the Victoire lost four players in the 2025 expansion draft, including defender Cayla Barnes to the Torrent. The 2025–26 season would see further success, despite the loss of Poulin to injury for much of March and April. The Victoire were notably dominant on home ice, with an 11–2–1–1 record at Place Bell and the Bell Centre, and finished with a 17–5–2–6 record overall. They tied the Boston Fleet to lead the league with 62 points, winning their second consecutive regular season title on the tiebreaker after a shootout victory over the Torrent in the final game of the season. The Victoire achieved their first postseason series victory, defeating the Frost in five games to reach the Walter Cup Finals for the first time. Facing the Ottawa Charge in the finals, the Victoire prevailed in a four-game series, becoming the first Canadian team to hoist the Walter Cup.

== Season-by-season record ==
Key of colours and symbols
Colour/symbol	Explanation
†	Indicates League Championship
*	Indicates Regular Season Championship

Year by year results
Season	GP	RW	OW	OL	RL	Pts	GF	GA	GD	Finish	Playoffs
2023–24	24	10	3	5	6	41	60	57	+3	2nd	Lost Semifinal, 0–3 (PWHL Boston)
2024–25*	30	12	7	3	8	53	77	67	+10	1st	Lost Semifinal, 1–3 (Ottawa Charge)
2025–26* †	30	16	6	2	6	62	78	41	+37	1st	Won Walter Cup, 3–1 (Ottawa Charge)

== Team identity ==
Inaugural season logo for PWHL Montreal.

Montreal operated without league branding during the PWHL's inaugural season, along with the other charter franchises. The team was known as PWHL Montreal and wore a league-wide jersey template that featured the city's name diagonally on the front. The team did have its own colour scheme, featuring burgundy, black, and beige. In October 2023, the league registered a trademark for the name Montreal Echo. Ultimately, when the league unveiled franchise names in September 2024, the team was given the name Victoire; it is a nod to the city's history of success in ice hockey. According to a report from The Hockey News, other names in contention for the team included the Lumieres and Metro. In addition to the Victoire name, the team's logo was unveiled, featuring "MV" initials and a fleur-de-lis, Quebec's national symbol. The team retained its colour scheme.

== Players and personnel ==
=== Current roster ===
As of 19 November 2026

No.	Nat	Player	Pos	S/G	Age	Acquired	Birthplace
15	(Canada)	Avi Adam	F	R	22	2026	Wolfville, Nova Scotia
35	(Canada)	Ann-Renée Desbiens	G	L	32	2023	La Malbaie, Quebec
22	(Canada)	Jessica DiGirolamo	D	R	27	2025	Mississauga, Ontario
77	(Canada)	Jade Downie-Landry	F	L	31	2025	Saint-Jean-sur-Richelieu, Quebec
28	(Canada)	Catherine Dubois	F	L	31	2023	Quebec City, Quebec
18	(Canada)	Jessie Eldridge	F	R	28	2026	Barrie, Ontario
91	(United States)	Maggie Flaherty	D	L	26	2025	Lakeville, Minnesota
88	(Canada)	Tamara Giaquinto	D	L	24	2025	Toronto, Ontario
88	(United States)	Skylar Irving	F	R	24	2025	Kingston, Massachusetts
33	(Finland)	Michelle Karvinen	F	L	36	2025	Rødovre, Denmark
13	(Canada)	Alexandra Labelle	F	L	30	2024	Saint-Louis-de-Gonzague, Quebec
98	(Canada)	Émilie Lavoie	F	L	25	2026	Beloeil, Quebec
25	(Sweden)	Lina Ljungblom	F	L	25	2023	Skövde, Sweden
31	(Canada)	Hailey MacLeod	G	L	22	2026	Abbotsford, British Columbia
27	(Canada)	Emma Maltais	F	L	27	2026	Burlington, Ontario
93	(Italy)	Nadia Mattivi	D	L	26	2026	Baselga di Piné, Trentino, Italy
16	(Finland)	Petra Nieminen	F	L	27	2026	Tampere, Finland
29	(Canada)	Marie-Philip Poulin (C)	F	L	35	2023	Beauceville, Quebec
17	(Canada)	Erica Rieder	D	L	29	2026	Regina, Saskatchewan
11	(United States)	Abby Roque	F	R	29	2025	Sault Ste. Marie, Michigan
7	(Canada)	Laura Stacey (A)	F	R	32	2023	Mississauga, Ontario
9	(Canada)	Kati Tabin	D	L	29	2023	Winnipeg, Manitoba
2	(Canada)	Zoe Uens	D	L	23	2025	Belleville, Ontario
1	(Canada)	Megan Warrener	G	L	23	2025	Stoney Creek, Ontario
19	(Canada)	Kaitlin Willoughby	F	R	31	2025	Prince Albert, Saskatchewan

=== Reserves ===
As of January 4, 2026

No.	Nat	Player	Pos	S/G	Age	Acquired	Birthplace
4	(Canada)	Maya Labad	F	L	24	2025	Mascouche, Quebec
51	(Canada)	Kelly-Ann Nadeau	D	R	28	2024	Mont-Laurier, Quebec

=== Team captains ===
- Marie-Philip Poulin, 2023–present

=== Head coaches ===
- Kori Cheverie, 2023–present

=== First-round draft picks ===
- 2023: Erin Ambrose (6th overall)
- 2024: Cayla Barnes (5th overall)
- 2025: Nicole Gosling (4th overall)
- 2026: Petra Nieminen (12th overall)

== Franchise milestones ==
Milestone	Player	Date	Opponent
First penalty	Marie-Philip Poulin for Holding	January 02, 2024	PWHL Ottawa
First goal	Claire Dalton Assisted by Jillian Dempsey and Kennedy Marchment	January 02, 2024	PWHL Ottawa
First win	Ann-Renée Desbiens	January 02, 2024	PWHL Ottawa
First hat-trick	Marie-Philip Poulin	January 10, 2024	PWHL New York
Longest goal streak (4)	Laura Stacey	February 22, 2025 – March 05, 2025	Ottawa Charge, Toronto Sceptres, Boston Fleet, Minnesota Frost
Players in the 50-Point-Club (3)	Marie-Philip Poulin, Laura Stacey, Abby Roque	November 26, 2025, February 26, 2026, April 07, 2026	New York Sirens, New York Sirens, Seattle Torrent
Longest point streak (7)	Abby Roque, Laura Stacey	December 20, 2025 – January 04, 2026 March 28, 2026 - April 17, 2026	Vancouver Goldeneyes, Seattle Torrent, Toronto Sceptres, New York Sirens, Minnesota Frost New York Sirens, Vancouver Goldeneyes, Ottawa Charge, Seattle Torrent, Boston Fleet, Boston Fleet
300 career shots on goal (1)	Laura Stacey	March 22, 2026	Ottawa Charge
First playoff hat-trick	Laura Stacey	May 02, 2026	Minnesota Frost

== Awards and honours ==
- Erin Ambrose – 2023–24, PWHL Defender of the Year
- Erin Ambrose – 2023–24 PWHL First Team All-Star
- Marie-Philip Poulin – 2023–24 PWHL First Team All-Star
- Maureen Murphy – 2023–24 Hockey for All Award
- Marie-Philip Poulin – 2024–25 PWHL Goals Leader
- Marie-Philip Poulin – 2024–25 PWHL First Team All-Star
- Marie-Philip Poulin – 2024–25 Forward of the Year
- Marie-Philip Poulin – 2024–25 Billie Jean King Most Valuable Player
- Laura Stacey – 2024–25 Hockey for All Award
- Ann-Renée Desbiens – 2024–25 PWHL First Team All-Star
- Ann-Renée Desbiens – 2024–25 Goaltender of the Year
- Kori Cheverie – 2025 PWHL Coach of the Year
- Marie-Philip Poulin – 2025–26 Ilana Kloss Playoff Most Valuable Player
- Ann-Renée Desbiens – 2025–26 PWHL Second Team All-Star
- Nicole Gosling – 2025–26 PWHL Second Team All-Star
- Laura Stacey – 2025–26 PWHL Second Team All-Star
- Nicole Gosling – 2025–26 PWHL All-Rookie Team
