= Naomi Boucher =

Canadian ice hockey player (born 2003)

- Born: Rimouski, Canada
- Height: 5 ft 6 in (168 cm)
- Position: Forward
- Shoots: Left
- PWHL team Former teams: New York Sirens; Yale Bulldogs (ECAC)
- Playing career: 2022–present

Naomi Boucher is a Canadian professional ice hockey forward for the New York Sirens of the Professional Women's Hockey League (PWHL). She played college ice hockey at Yale.

== Playing career ==
=== College ===
Boucher began her college ice hockey career for Yale during the 2022–23 season. During her freshman year, she recorded four goals and six assists in 32 games. During the 2023–24 season, in her sophomore year, she recorded five goals and five assists in 32 games. During the 2024–25 season, her junior year, she recorded five goals and seven assists in 31 games. During the 2025–26 season, in her senior year, she recorded a career-high six goals and 21 assists in 36 games.

=== Professional ===
On June 17, 2026, Boucher was drafted in the sixth round, 67th overall, by the New York Sirens in the 2026 PWHL Draft.

== Personal life ==
Boucher is the daughter of former NHL coach Guy Boucher. She has a twin sister, Mila, and a brother, Vincent.

== Career statistics ==
			Regular season					Playoffs
Season	Team	League	GP	G	A	Pts	PIM	GP	G	A	Pts	PIM
2022–23	Yale University	ECAC	32	4	6	10	4	—	—	—	—	—
2023–24	Yale University	ECAC	32	5	5	10	6	—	—	—	—	—
2024–25	Yale University	ECAC	31	5	7	12	6	—	—	—	—	—
2025–26	Yale University	ECAC	36	6	21	27	22	—	—	—	—	—
NCAA totals			131	20	39	59	38	—	—	—	—	—
