= Quinnipiac Bobcats women's ice hockey =

American collegiate ice hockey program

- Current season
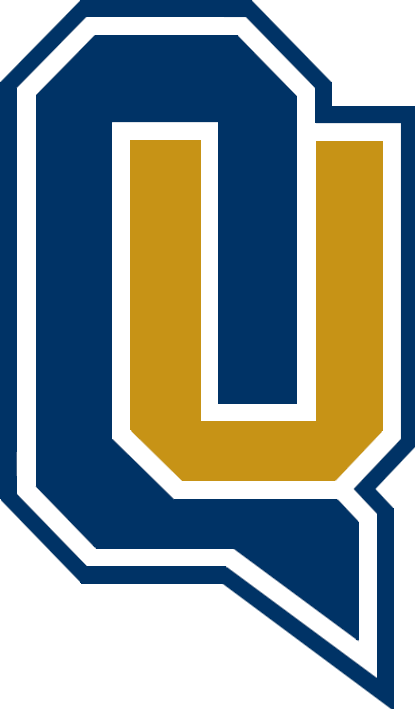
- University: Quinnipiac University
- Conference: ECAC
- Head coach: Cassandra Turner; 7th season, 67–30–14
- Arena: M&T Bank Arena; Hamden, Connecticut
- Colors: Navy and gold
- Fight song: "Bobcat Roar"

NCAA tournament appearances
- 2015, 2016, 2022, 2023, 2026

Conference tournament champions
- 2016, 2026

The Quinnipiac Bobcats women's ice hockey is the official program that represents Quinnipiac University in Hamden, Connecticut. The Bobcats have competed in ECAC Hockey since the 2005–2006 season where they replaced Vermont when the Catamounts moved to Hockey East. Prior to that season the Bobcats competed in College Hockey America for the 2004–2005 season, played as a Division I Independent for the 2002–2003 and 2003–2004 seasons, and in the ECAC Division I Eastern division for the 2001–2002 season.

The Bobcats play in M&T Bank Arena (formerly People's United Center) in Hamden, Connecticut.

== Year by year ==
=== Table key ===
Key of colors and symbols
Color/symbol	Explanation
‡	Conference tournament champions
↑	Conference regular season champions

Key of terms and abbreviations
Term or abbreviation	Definition
W	Number of wins
L	Number of losses
T	Number of ties
Finish	Final position in conference standings
Tournament	Results in conference tournament

=== Yearly results ===
Year by year listing of Quinnipiac Bobcats women's ice hockey seasons
Season	Coach	Overall			Conference	Conference					Season result	Ref.
Season	Coach	W	L	T	Conference	W	L	T	Finish	Tournament	Season result	Ref.
2001–02*	Amanda Adams	3	27	2	ECAC Eastern						Did not qualify	
2002–03	Michael Barrett	5	25	2	Independent						Did not qualify	
2003–04	Michael Barrett	11	21	2	Independent						Did not qualify	
2004–05	Michael Barrett	5	25	2	CHA	0	12	0	4th CHA	Lost Semifinals vs. Mercyhurst (1–9)	Did not qualify	
2005–06	Michael Barrett	10	18	6	ECAC	3	13	4	10th ECAC	Did not qualify	Did not qualify	
2006–07	Michael Barrett	8	24	2	ECAC	5	16	1	10th ECAC	Did not qualify	Did not qualify	
2007–08	Michael Barrett	5	25	5	ECAC	2	16	4	11th ECAC	Did not qualify	Did not qualify	
2008–09	Rick Seeley	3	26	5	ECAC	2	15	5	11th ECAC	Did not qualify	Did not qualify	
2009–10	Rick Seeley	19	10	8	ECAC	11	4	7	4th ECAC	Lost Quarterfinals vs. RPI (2–1 OT, 0–1, 1–2 5OT)	Did not qualify	
2010–11	Rick Seeley	22	12	3	ECAC	12	9	1	5th ECAC	Won Quarterfinals vs. Princeton (2–1, 2–0); Lost Semifinals vs. Cornell (3–4)	Did not qualify	
2011–12	Rick Seeley	19	6	2	ECAC	12	8	2	6th ECAC	Won Quarterfinals vs. Clarkson (4–1, 1–2, 2–0); Lost Semifinals vs. Cornell (1–5)	Did not qualify	
2012–13	Rick Seeley	20	12	4	ECAC	13	6	3	4th ECAC	Lost Quarterfinals vs. St. Lawrence (0–1 OT, 3–2 3OT, 0–2)	Did not qualify	
2013–14	Rick Seeley	22	6	9	ECAC	11	4	7	4th ECAC	Won Quarterfinals vs. St. Lawrence (5–0, 2–1); Lost Semifinals vs. Clarkson (0–6)	Did not qualify	
2014–15	Rick Seeley	26	9	3	ECAC	15	5	2	3rd ECAC	Won Quarterfinals vs. Princeton (7–0, 2–0); Lost Semifinals vs. Harvard (1–2 OT)	Lost Quarterfinals vs. Harvard (0–5)	
2015–16	Cassandra Turner	30	3	5	ECAC‡	18	1	4	1st ECAC↑	Won Quarterfinals vs. RPI (3–2 OT, 2–1 2OT); Won Semifinals vs. St. Lawrence (2–1); Won Championship vs. Clarkson (1–0)‡	Lost First Round vs. Clarkson (0–1)	
2016–17	Cassandra Turner	21	10	6	ECAC	13	6	3	5th ECAC	Lost Quarterfinals vs. Princeton (3–2 3OT, 0–2, 1–2)	Did not qualify	
2017–18	Cassandra Turner	16	17	3	ECAC	12	9	1	5th ECAC	Lost Quarterfinals vs. St. Lawrence (1–3, 1–2)	Did not qualify	
2018–19	Cassandra Turner	12	18	8	ECAC	9	9	4	6th ECAC	Lost Quarterfinals vs. Clarkson (0–3, 3–4 OT)	Did not qualify	
2019–20	Cassandra Turner	20	14	3	ECAC	11	9	2	7th ECAC	Lost Quarterfinals vs. Princeton 1–5, 3–2 OT, 2–3 2OT)	Canceled due to COVID 19	
2020–21	Cassandra Turner	10	6	0	ECAC	4	5	0	4th ECAC	Lost Semifinals vs. Colgate (1–2)	Did not qualify	
2021–22	Cassandra Turner	26	10	3	ECAC	15	7	0	4th ECAC	Won Quarterfinals vs. Clarkson (5–1, 4–0); Lost Semifinals vs. Colgate (2–3)	Won First Round vs. Syracuse (4–0); Lost Quarterfinals vs. Ohio State (3–4 2OT)	
2022–23	Cassandra Turner	30	10	0	ECAC	17	5	0	3rd ECAC	Won Quarterfinals vs. St. Lawrence (2–1, 2–3, 2–1 OT); Lost Semifinals vs. Colgate (1–5)	Won First Round vs. Penn State (2–3 3OT); Lost Semifinals vs. Ohio State (2–5)	
2023–24	Cassandra Turner	25	11	1	ECAC	13	9	0	5th ECAC	Lost Quarterfinals vs. Cornell (3–2, 5–0)	Did not qualify	
2024–25	Cassandra Turner	22	12	4	ECAC	11	8	3	5th ECAC	Lost Quarterfinals vs. Cornell (3–2 OT, 5–0)	Did not qualify	
2025–26	Cassandra Turner	29	9	3	ECAC‡	14	6	2	3rd ECAC	Won Quarterfinals vs. Brown (6–3, 2–3 OT, 5–4); Won Semifinals vs. Princeton (2–1 OT); Won Finals vs. Yale (5–1)‡	Won First Round vs. Franklin Pierce (4–0); Lost Quarterfinals vs. Wisconsin (0–6)	

- In their inaugural season (2001–02), the Quinnipiac Braves were in the ECAC Eastern Conference. Effective 2002–03, the team's nickname was changed to the Bobcats. They played as a Division I independent that season and 2003–04. In 2004–05, the team played in the College Hockey America Conference . The following season, the Bobcats joined the ECAC where they still compete.

== History ==
On February 28, 2010, Quinnipiac made NCAA history. Against the Rensselaer Engineers, the Bobcats lost by a score of 2–1, but it took five overtimes. It is now the longest college hockey game in NCAA history. Senior defenseman Laura Gersten had the game-winning goal. She registered it at 4:32 of the fifth overtime session to not only clinch the win, but the series victory. RPI advanced to the ECAC Hockey Women's Semifinals for the second consecutive season. The Engineers faced top ranked Cornell University.

On November 12 and 13, 2010, Kelly Babstock made Quinnipiac hockey history as she accounted for six of the seven goals scored over the weekend. Babstock registered back to back hat tricks against ECAC opponents (No. 10 ranked Harvard and Dartmouth). In addition, she is the first skater in Quinnipiac history to record two hat tricks in one season. As of November 14, Babstock led the team and the entire NCAA in goals (13) and points (27).

Versus the Brown Bears on Friday, December 3, 2010, Kelly Babstock became Quinnipiac's all-time leader in goals scored in a season by netting her 16th goal of the season. Babstock's nation leading sixth game-winning goal against Yale on Saturday, Dec 4 was part of a Bobcats 3–1 win.

With a second period goal versus the Colgate Raiders on November 19, 2011, Kelly Babstock of the Quinnipiac Bobcats became the program's all-time leading scorer. In just her second season, Babstock surpassed Vicki Graham, who finished with 73 career points, after the 2006–07 season. Babstock reached the milestone in her 50th career game.

Kelly Babstock led all skaters in points at the 2011 Nutmeg Classic with four (one goal, three assists). With the two assists in the championship game, Babstock earned the 39 and 40 assists of her career, surpassing Caitlin Peters as the all-time assist leader in Bobcats history. Breann Frykas scored the game-winning goal as the Bobcats bested the Robert Morris Colonials by a 3–2 tally. The victory in the Nutmeg Classic was also the 200th career victory of head coach Rick Seeley.

== Current roster ==
As of September 22, 2026.

No.	Nat.	Player	Class	Pos	Height	DoB	Hometown	Previous team
2	(Canada)	Ellie Gauvin	Graduate	D	5' 9" (1.75 m)		2004-04-14	Moose Jaw, Saskatchewan	Brown (ECAC)	—
3	(Canada)	Aynsley D'Ottavio	Junior	D	5' 5" (1.65 m)		2005-05-13	Chilliwack, British Columbia	Chilliwack Secondary School	—
4	(United States)	Sophie Rousseau	Sophomore	D	5' 9" (1.75 m)		2006-08-13	Kent, CT	Kent School	—
5	(United States)	Ella Sennick	Junior	D	5' 10" (1.78 m)		2006-03-10	Lafayette Hill, PA	Mount Saint Joseph Academy	—
6	(Canada)	Rosalie Breton	Freshman	D	5' 5" (1.65 m)		2006-03-06	St-Bernard, QC	Cégep Limoilou	—
8	(Canada)	Kahlen Lamarche	Senior	F	5' 6" (1.68 m)		2005-04-16	Sudbury, ON	Everest Academy	—
9	(United States)	Taylor Brueske	Junior	F	5' 8" (1.73 m)		2006-02-17	Moorhead, MN	Moorhead High School	—
10	(Canada)	Avery Bairos	Junior	F	5' 6" (1.68 m)		2006-09-01	Saskatoon, SK	St. Joseph High School	—
11	(United States)	Regan Berglund	Sophomore	F	5' 8" (1.73 m)		2007-01-19	Mahtomedi, MN	Hill-Murray School	—
12	(Canada)	Clara-Mai Van Houtte-Cachero	Freshman	D	5' 8" (1.73 m)		2006-05-13	Pointe-Claire, QC	John Abbott College	—
13	(Canada)	Keara Parker	Senior	F	5' 7" (1.7 m)		2005-07-17	Winnipeg, MB	St. Thomas (WCHA)	—
15	(United States)	Lincoln Brown	Sophomore	F	5' 7" (1.7 m)		2007-05-31	Los Angeles, CA	Culver Academy	—
16	(United States)	Bryn Prier	Junior	F	5' 4" (1.63 m)		2004-10-01	Juno Beach, FL	William T. Dwyer High School	—
17	(United States)	Brynne West	Senior	D	5' 9" (1.75 m)		2005-01-17	River Forest, IL	Fenwick High School	—
18	(United States)	Ilsa Lindaman	Junior	F	5' 9" (1.75 m)			Duluth, MN	St. Thomas (WCHA)	—
19	(Canada)	Alex Law	Senior	F	5' 8" (1.73 m)		2005-08-16	Whitby, ON	Boston University (ECAC)	—
21	(Canada)	Annabelle Kruzich	Freshman	F	5' 9" (1.75 m)		2007-07-06	Stittsville, ON	Appleby College	—
22	(France)	Jade Barbirati	Sophomore	F	5' 6" (1.68 m)		2004-01-06	Aix-les-Bains, France	John Abbott College	—
23	(United States)	Cassidy Lobisser	Freshman	F	5' 4" (1.63 m)		2008-07-01	Bellingham, MA	North American Hockey Academy	—
26	(United States)	Annika Stock	Freshman	F	5' 7" (1.7 m)		2008-08-01	Anchorage, AK	Bishop Kearney HS	—
27	(United States)	Ella Johnson	Sophomore	F	5' 10" (1.78 m)		2007-07-25	Palmer, AK	North American Hockey Academy	—
28	(Canada)	Makayla Watson	Junior	D	5' 6" (1.68 m)		2006-05-22	Calgary, AB	George Elliot Secondary School	—
29	(Canada)	Peyton Cormier	Sophomore	F	5' 4" (1.63 m)		2007-01-14	Trenton, ON	Kingston Jr. Ice Wolves	—
30	(Sweden)	Felicia Frank	Junior	G	5' 8" (1.73 m)		2005-02-27	Falköping, SWE	Brynäs IF (SDHL)	—
33	(United States)	Casey Clausen	Sophomore	G	5' 8" (1.73 m)			Whitesboro, NY	Northwood School	—
47	(United States)	Natalia Dilbone	Freshman	G	5' 8" (1.73 m)		2008-01-03	Columbus, OH	Little Caesars	—

== International ==
The following players represented their countries in international tournaments.

- Lexie Adzija, Canada, World U18 Championship bronze medalist
- Jade Barbirati, France, 2026 Winter Olympics
- Taryn Baumgardt, Canada, World U18 Championship player
- Zoe Boyd, Canada, World U18 Championship bronze medalist
- Nicole Connery, Canada, World U18 Championship player
- Sarah-Ève Coutu-Godbout, Canada, World U18 Championship silver medalist
- Breann Frykas, Canada, World U18 Championship silver medalist
- Nanna Holm Glaas, Denmark, five-time World Championship player (DI and DII)
- Anna Kilponen, Finland, Olympian, five-time World Championship and three-time World U18 Championship player
- Nicole Kosta, Canada, World U18 Championship player
- Hayley McMeekin, Canada U22 Selects, 2008 European Air Canada Cup
- Cydney Roesler, Canada, World U18 Championship gold and silver medalist
- Erica Udén Johansson, Sweden, three-time Olympian and five-time World Championship player

== Awards and honors ==
- Sydney Rossman (born 1995), in her junior year Rossman was named the ECAC Hockey Goaltender of the year, an ECAC Hockey Player of the Year Finalist, and the most outstanding player of the 2016 ECAC Hockey Tournament and All-Tournament.
- Kelly Babstock, 2010–11 New England Women's Division I All-Star
- Rick Seeley, 2009–10 ECAC Coach of the Year
- Rick Seeley, 2009–10 New England Hockey Writers All-Star Team (Coach)
- Victoria Vigilanti, Ranked second in 2009–10 ECAC season, Goals against average (1.15)
- Victoria Vigilanti, 2009–10 ECAC Goaltender of the Year
- Victoria Vigilanti, 2009–10 New England Hockey Writers All-Star Team
- Hughes and Vigilanti made school history. It marks the first time in women's hockey history at the school that two players both received postseason honours in the same year. In addition, it marked the first time since the 2006–07 season that a player from the Bobcats received a postseason honour.

=== ECAC Awards ===
- Lexie Adzija, 2021–22 ECAC Hockey Mandi Schwartz Student-Athlete of the Year
- Felicia Frank, 2025–26 ECAC Goalie of the Year

==== ECAC All-Stars ====
- Victoria Vigilanti, 2009–10 All-ECAC First Team
- Zoe Boyd, 2021–22 All-ECAC Third Team
- Felicia Frank, Goaltender: 2025–26 All-ECAC First Team
- Kahlen Lamarche, Forward: 2025–26 All-ECAC First Team

==== ECAC All-Rookie Team ====
- Heather Hughes, 2009–10 ECAC All-Rookie Team
- Victoria Vigilanti, 2009–10 ECAC All-Rookie Team
- Kate Reilly, 2019–20 ECAC All-Rookie Team Selection

==== ECAC Weekly Awards ====
- Heather Hughes, ECAC Rookie of the Week (Week of November 9, 2009)
- Victoria Vigilanti, ECAC Defensive Player of the Week (Week of October 19, 2009)
- Victoria Vigilanti, ECAC Defensive Player of the Week (Week of February 22, 2010)
- Victoria Vigilanti, 2009–10 ECAC Leader, Save percentage (.957)
- Catie Boudiette, Adirondack Health Rookie of the Week (Awarded February 22, 2021)

=== Team Awards ===
- Kelly Babstock, 2010–11 Quinnipiac women's ice hockey Rookie of the Year
- Kelly Babstock, 2010–11 Quinnipiac women's ice hockey Most Valuable Player
- Kallie Flor, 2010 Most Valuable Player
- Kelsey Britton, 2010 Coaches Award
- Jordan Elkins, 2010 Top Defensive Player
- Victoria Vigilanti, 2010 Rookie of the Year
- Lexie Adzija, 2018–19 Bobcats Rookie of the Year

== Bobcats in elite hockey ==
A number of Bobcats alumnae have pursued post-collegiate ice hockey careers in elite leagues around the world. In North America, Bobcats have played in leagues and organizations including the Canadian Women's Hockey League (CWHL; 2007–2019), the Premier Hockey Federation (PHF since 2021; founded in 2015 as NWHL), and the Professional Women's Hockey Players Association (PWHPA; 2019–23), and Professional Women's Hockey League (PWHL; founded 2023). Additionally, many alumnae have played in international leagues including the DEBL, the German Women's Hockey League (DFEL), the European Women's Hockey League (EWHL), the Swedish Women's Hockey League (SDHL), and the Zhenskaya Hockey League (ZhHL).

The following list is not exhaustive, please assist by contributing missing content.

Key of colors and symbols
Color/symbol	Explanation
†	CWHL All-Star
‡	NWHL All-Star
↑	Clarkson Cup Champion
#	Isobel Cup Champion
§	Walter Cup Champion

Player	Pos.	Team(s)	League(s)	Years	Championship(s)
Lexie Adzija	F	PWHL Ottawa	PWHL	2023–24	
Lexie Adzija	F	PWHL Boston; Boston Fleet	PWHL	2023–25	
Lexie Adzija	F	Seattle Torrent	PWHL	2025–present	
Kelly Babstock‡	F	Connecticut Whale	NWHL	2015–18	
Kelly Babstock‡	F	Buffalo Beauts	NWHL	2018–19	
Kelly Babstock‡	F	Tri-State	PWHPA	2019–20	
Kelly Babstock‡	F	Metropolitan Riveters	NWHL/PHF	2020–23	
Kelly Babstock‡	F	Ladies Team Lugano	SWHL A	2023–24	
Kelly Babstock‡	F	PWHL Boston	PWHL	2023–24	
Taryn Baumgardt	D	Calgary Inferno	CWHL	2017–18	
Brooke Bonsteel	F	Mad Dogs Manheim	DFEL	2021–22	
Regan Boulton	D	EHV Sabres Wien	EWHL	2013–15	
Laura Brennan	G	Connecticut Whale	NWHL	2017–19	
Nicole Brown	F	Markham Thunder	CWHL	2017–19	
Nicole Brown	F	Independent	PWHPA	2019–20	
Nicole Connery	F	Connecticut Whale	NWHL	2016–17	
Sarah-Ève Coutu-Godbout	F	Toronto Six	PHF	2020–21	
Sarah-Ève Coutu-Godbout	F	AIK Hockey	SDHL	2021–22	
Sarah-Ève Coutu-Godbout	F	Frölunda HC	NDHL	2022–23	
Shiann Darkangelo‡	F	Connecticut Whale	NWHL	2015–16	
Shiann Darkangelo‡	F	Buffalo Beauts	NWHL	2016–17	1 (2017)#
Shiann Darkangelo‡	F	Kunlun Red Star	CWHL	2017–18	
Shiann Darkangelo‡	F	Toronto Furies	CWHL	2018–19	
Shiann Darkangelo‡	F	GTA West	PWHPA	2019–20	
Shiann Darkangelo‡	F	Toronto Six	PHF	2020–23	1 (2023)#
Shiann Darkangelo‡	F	PWHL Boston	PWHL	2023–24	
Shiann Darkangelo‡	F	PWHL Ottawa; Ottawa Charge	PWHL	2023–25	
Shiann Darkangelo‡	F	Montreal Victoire	PWHL	2025–present	1 (2026)§
Kelley Davies	F	Neuberg Highlanders	DEBL		
Janine Duffy	F	Neuberg Highlanders	DEBL		
Morgan Fritz-Ward	F	New York Riveters	PHF		
Breann Frykas	F	Connecticut Whale	PHF		
Taylor Girard	F	Connecticut Whale	PHF	2021–23	
Taylor Girard	F	PWHL Boston; Boston Fleet	PWHL	2023–25	
Taylor Girard	F	New York Sirens	PWHL	2025–present	
Emma Greco	F	Connecticut Whale	NWHL	2017–18	
Emma Greco	F	Toronto Furies	CWHL	2018–19	
Emma Greco	F	GTA West	PWHPA	2019–20	
Emma Greco	F	Toronto Six	PHF	2020–21; 2022–23	1 (2023)#
Emma Greco	F	PWHL Minnesota	PWHL	2023–24	1 (2024)§
Emma Greco	F	Boston Fleet	PWHL	2024–25	
Emma Greco	F	Vancouver Goldeneyes	PWHL	2025–26	
Emma Greco	F	Ottawa Charge	PWHL	2026–present	
Nanna Holm Glaas	G	Segeltorps IF	Riksserien	2007–08; 2009–10	
Nanna Holm Glaas	G	AIK Hockey	SDHL	2010–11	
Taylor House	F	Boston Pride	PHF	2022–23	
Taylor House	F	MoDo Hockey	SDHL	2023–24	
Taylor House	F	Ottawa Charge	PWHL	2024–present	
Anna Kilponen	D	Ilves Tampere	NSML	2020–22; 2023–24	
Anna Kilponen	D	KRS Vanke Rays	ZhHL	2020–22	
Anna Kilponen	D	Metropolitan Riveters	PHF	2022–23	
Anna Kilponen	D	ZSC Lions	SWHL A	2023–24	
Nicole Kosta	D	Connecticut Whale	NWHL	2016–17	
Nicole Kosta	D	Markham Thunder	CWHL	2017–19	1 (2018)↑
Nicole Kosta	D	GTA East	PWHPA	2019–20	
Nicole Kosta	D	Team Toronto	PWHPA	2020–22	
Nicole Kosta	D	Team Scotiabank	PWHPA	2022–23	
Nicole Kosta	D	PWHL Boston	PWHL	2023–24	
Chelsea Laden	G	Connecticut Whale	NWHL	2015–16	
Chelsea Laden	G	New York Riveters	NWHL	2015–16	
MacKenzie Lancaster	F	Connecticut Whale	NWHL	2020–21	
Laura Lundblad	F	Mad Dogs Manheim	DFEL	2021–22	
Brittany Lyons	F	Neuberg Highlanders	EWHL	2013–14	
Brittany Lyons	F	Boston Blades	CWHL	2015–16	
Meredith Malloy	F	Linköping HC	SDHL	2010–11	
Randi Marcon	F	Toronto Six	PHF	2021–22	
Elena Orlando	D	Sundsvall/Timrå	SDHL	2014–15	
Elena Orlando	D	New York Riveters	NWHL	2015–16	
Elena Orlando	D	Connecticut Whale	NWHL	2016–21	
Elena Orlando	D	Buffalo Beauts	PHF	2021–22	
Trudy Reyns	D	Ravens Salzburg	EWHL	2009–10	
Cydney Roesler	D	Connecticut Whale	NWHL	2016–19	
Sydney Rossman	G	Connecticut Whale	NWHL	2017–18	
Sydney Rossman	G	Minnesota Whitecaps	NWHL	2018–19	1 (2019)#
Melissa Samoskevich	F	Brynäs IF	SDHL	2019–20	
Melissa Samoskevich	F	New England (2019–20)	PWHPA	2019–20	
Melissa Samoskevich	F	Connecticut Whale	PHF	2020–23	
Kati Tabin	D	Connecticut Whale	PHF	2021–22	
Kati Tabin	D	Toronto Six	PHF	2022–23	1 (2023)#
Kati Tabin	D	PWHL Montreal; Montreal Victoire	PWHL	2023–present	1 (2026)§
Meghan Turner	F	Worcester Blades	CWHL	2018–19	
Meghan Turner	F	New England	PWHPA	2019–20	
Meghan Turner	F	New Hampshire	PWHPA	2020–21	
Meghan Turner	F	Boston	PWHPA	2021–22	
Erica Udén Johansson	F	Sundsvall/Timrå	SDHL	2015–17	
Erica Udén Johansson	F	Brynäs IF	SDHL	2017–18	
Erica Udén Johansson	F	AIK Hockey	SDHL	2018–22	
Felicia Vieweg	D	Neuberg Highlanders	DEBL	2013–14	
Felicia Vieweg	D	Connecticut Whale	NWHL	2015–16	
Victoria Vigilanti	G	EHV Sabres Wien	EWHL	2013–16; 2017–18	
Victoria Vigilanti	G	KMH Budapest	EWHL	2016–17	
Lindsey West	D	Sundsvall/Timrå	SDHL	2016–17	
Kaitlyn Wheeler	F	Neuberg Highlanders	DEBL	2012–13	
Emma Woods	F	Vanke Rays	CWHL	2017–18	
Emma Woods	F	Shenzhen KRS Vanke Rays	CWHL	2018–19	
Emma Woods	F	Leksands IF	SDHL	2019–20	
Emma Woods	F	Toronto Six	PHF	2020–23	1 (2023)#
Emma Woods	F	PWHL New York	PWHL	2023–24	
Emma Woods	F	Toronto Sceptres	PWHL	2024–present	

== See also ==
- Quinnipiac Bobcats men's ice hockey
