= Quinn Hughes =

American ice hockey player (born 1999)

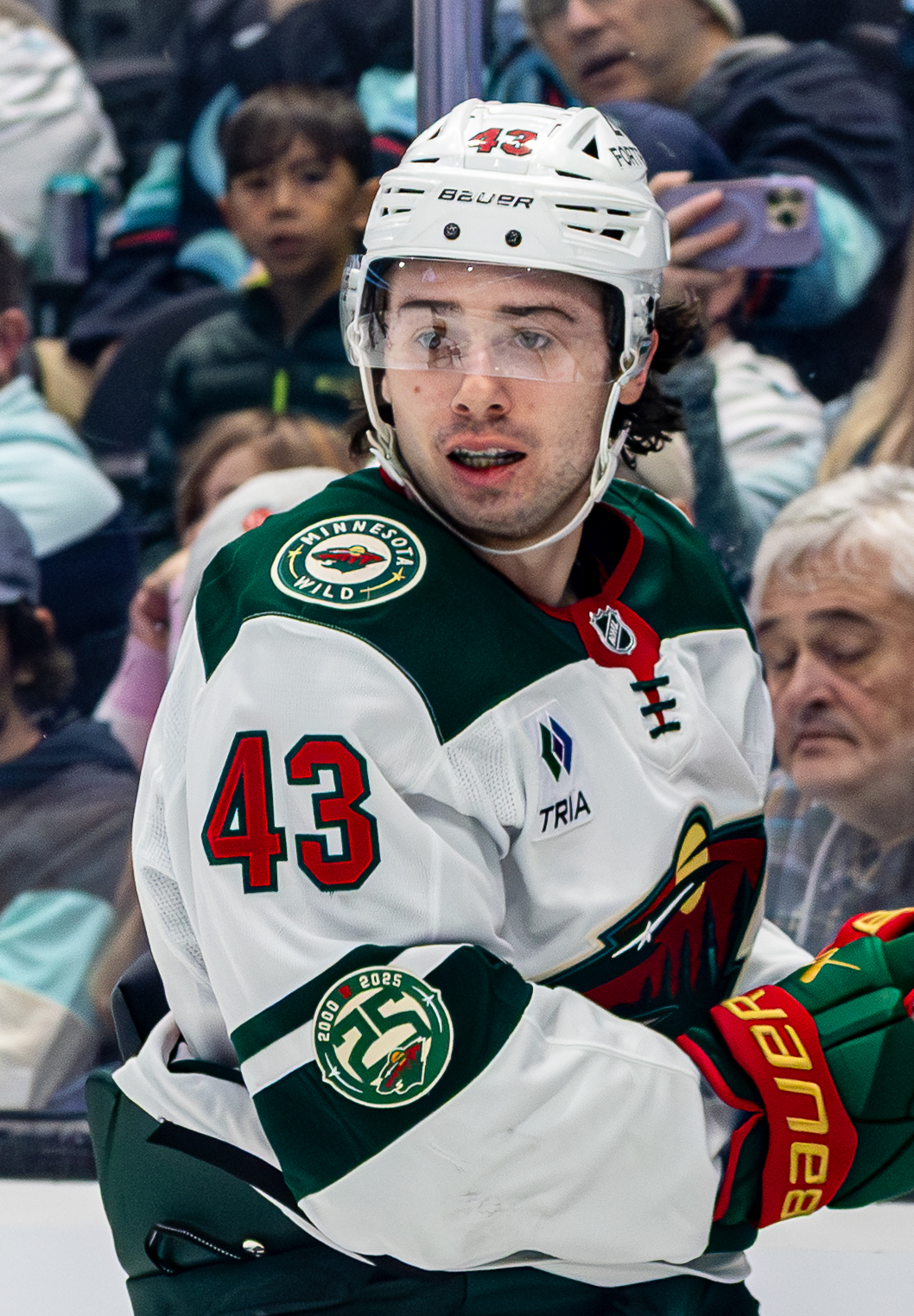
- Hughes with the Minnesota Wild in 2026
- Born: October 14, 1999 (age 27) Orlando, Florida, U.S.
- Height: 5 ft 10 in (178 cm)
- Weight: 180 lb (82 kg; 12 st 12 lb)
- Position: Defense
- Shoots: Left
- NHL team Former teams: Minnesota Wild; Vancouver Canucks
- National team: United States
- NHL draft: 7th overall, 2018; Vancouver Canucks
- Playing career: 2019–present

Quintin Jerome Hughes (born October 14, 1999) is an American professional ice hockey player who is a defenseman for the Minnesota Wild of the National Hockey League (NHL). Hughes was drafted seventh overall by the Vancouver Canucks in the 2018 NHL entry draft and played his first seven seasons with the team, serving as captain from 2023 until his trade to the Wild in 2025. Before the draft, he was considered a top prospect. Showing impressive offensive prowess as a defenseman since the beginning of his time with the Canucks, he was nominated for the Calder Memorial Trophy as the league's best rookie in 2020. He holds several Canucks and NHL records for defensemen, and won the James Norris Memorial Trophy in 2024 as the NHL's best defenseman.

Following success with the USA Hockey National Team Development Program, Hughes joined the University of Michigan for the 2017–18 season. There he set a new record for most assists by a Michigan freshman defenseman and was named to the All-Big Ten Freshman Team and the All-Big Ten Second Team.

Internationally, Hughes has represented the United States at the 2018 and 2019 World Junior Championships. He made his senior national team debut at the 2018 World Championship where he helped them win bronze, and played a pivotal role in the American victory at the 2026 Winter Olympics.

Hughes is from a family of ice hockey players; his younger brother Jack was drafted first overall by the New Jersey Devils in the 2019 NHL entry draft, while his youngest brother Luke was drafted fourth overall in the 2021 NHL entry draft, also by the Devils. His mother Ellen Weinberg-Hughes played for the United States women's national ice hockey team and his father was the director of player development for the Toronto Maple Leafs.

== Early life ==
Hughes was born in Orlando, Florida, to mother, Ellen Weinberg-Hughes, and father, Jim Hughes. The family lived in Orlando while his father was an assistant coach for the Orlando Solar Bears. Hughes' mother is Jewish and his father is Catholic.

Hughes comes from a "hockey family." In college, his mother was captain of the Wildcats women's ice hockey team at the University of New Hampshire during its "powerhouse" era under head coach Russ McCurdy, and was named to the 1991 ECAC Division I All-Star Team, the highest honor in women's collegiate ice hockey at the time. She then went on to win silver in the 1992 Women's World Championship and was one of the six players named to the tournament All-Star team at its conclusion. Like Hughes, she also played defense. Weinberg-Hughes also served as an advisor to the Norwegian Ice Hockey Association to help grow the women's ice hockey ahead of the 1994 Winter Olympics. She joined the United States women's team as a development consultant in 2023, and has been credited with helping the team win gold at the 2023 and 2025 World Championships and gold at the 2026 Winter Olympics. Hughes' father, Jim Hughes, also has a career in ice hockey. He was a team captain for Providence College, assistant coach for the Orlando Solar Bears, assistant coach for the Boston Bruins, and director of player development for the Toronto Maple Leafs.

Hughes' grandfather, Marty, is a Marine veteran and battalion chief with the New York City Fire Department; he came out of retirement to assist firefighters in Queens during the September 11 attacks.

The family moved to Toronto in 2006, after Hughes' father got a job as an assistant with the American Hockey League's Toronto Marlies, and the brothers practiced primarily at Toronto's Wedgewood Park outdoor rink. The family also billeted William Nylander after he was drafted in 2014.

== Playing career ==
=== Early career ===
Hughes began playing hockey while his family was living in Boston due to his father's work. He began playing as a forward before transitioning to defense at the age of 13.

Hughes' family moved to Toronto in 2006, as his father found work with the Toronto Maple Leafs. As he had begun skating at a young age, while in elementary school he was given permission to skate during lunch period after he consistently became distracted during class watching his younger brother and father skate on a frozen baseball diamond. Hughes' ice hockey career began when he played Bantam AAA and Minor Midget AAA hockey for the Toronto Marlboros, before joining the USA Hockey National Team Development Program (USNTDP) in 2015. He also had the option of joining the Ontario Hockey League (OHL), as the Sarnia Sting drafted him in the third round of the 2015 OHL draft, but Hughes chose to continue developing in the United States. However, before joining the USNTDP, he made a verbal commitment in January 2015 to play college ice hockey at the University of Michigan for their 2017–18 season.

Hughes played in the USNTDP alongside fellow top prospect Brady Tkachuk, with whom he shared a room. In his first year with the USNTDP team, Hughes scored seven goals and recorded 17 assists in 57 games. During the 2016–17 season, he recorded four goals and 22 assists in 26 games, making him the first defenseman in United States Hockey League (USHL) history to post such high points-per-game ratio two seasons before his NHL draft eligibility. For his efforts, he was named to the All-USHL Second Team.

=== College ===
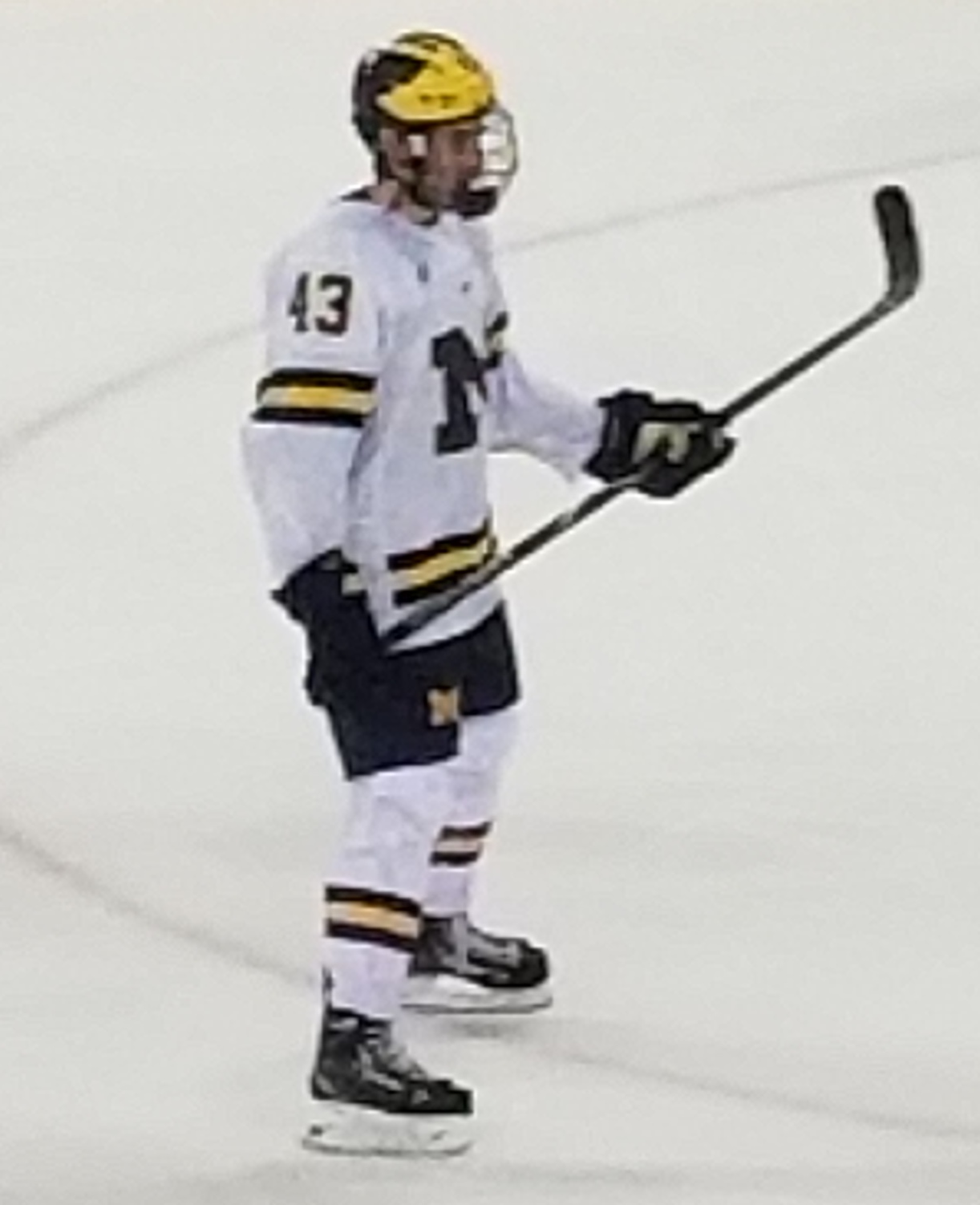
Hughes playing for the University of Michigan in October 2018

Hughes played for the Michigan Wolverines at the University of Michigan from 2017 to 2019. There, he enrolled in the School of Kinesiology and majored in Sport Management. His roommate at Michigan was his Wolverines teammate, former USNDTP teammate, and future NHL player Josh Norris. Hughes has described Norris as his best friend in news reports, but in November 2024 Hughes also received his first-ever game-misconduct and ejection from a hockey game for cross-checking Norris from behind in a game between Ottawa and Vancouver.

During his rookie season at Michigan, in which he was the youngest NCAA male ice hockey player, Hughes recorded five goals and 24 assists in 37 games. His 29 points ranked tied for 12th in the NCAA and third in the Big Ten among freshmen, while his 24 assists ranked third in the NCAA and first overall in the Big Ten among freshman. Hughes' 24 assists is the most in Michigan program history by a freshman defenseman. Following an outstanding freshman season, Hughes was named to the Big Ten All-Freshman Team, and the All-Big Ten Second Team. He was also selected as a finalist for Big Ten Freshman of the Year, with the award eventually going to Mitchell Lewandowski of Michigan State.

Leading up to the 2018 NHL entry draft, Hughes was considered a top prospect player due to his skating and puck-moving ability. The final ranking from the NHL Central Scouting Bureau in April placed Hughes in sixth place amongst North American skaters. He was eventually drafted by the Vancouver Canucks in the first round, seventh overall. He attended the Canucks development camp that summer but ultimately decided to return to Michigan for his sophomore year, citing a goal to win an NCAA championship and furthering his development as his reasons.

Despite speculation Hughes would leave Michigan early to join the Canucks, he finished the 2018–19 season with the Wolverines. During the 2019 Big Ten Men's Ice Hockey Tournament, he suffered a foot injury in a 3–2 loss to the Minnesota Golden Gophers on March 8, 2019. After an x-ray showed limited damage to his foot, Hughes played the following night in a 4–1 loss to the Golden Gophers, which thus eliminated the Wolverines from the playoff series. During his sophomore season, Hughes recorded five goals and 28 assists in 32 games, ranking first on the Wolverines in scoring. Following an outstanding season, he was named to the All-Big Ten First Team and was nominated for the Hobey Baker Award. He was also named a finalist for Big Ten Player of the Year and Big Ten Defensive Player of the Year. On March 12, Hughes was named to the AHCA First-Team All-America, becoming the 95th All-American in Michigan's history.

=== Professional ===
On March 10, 2019, Hughes ended his collegiate career following his sophomore season, signing a three-year entry-level contract with the Canucks. After signing, Hughes underwent an MRI by the Canucks medical staff and was discouraged from skating for a week as a result of his foot injury sustained from the Big Ten playoffs. He eventually made his NHL debut on March 28, 2019, against the Los Angeles Kings where he played on a pairing with Luke Schenn. He recorded his first career NHL point, an assist on a Brock Boeser goal, in a 3–2 shootout win.

==== Vancouver Canucks (2018–2025) ====
===== Rookie season and Calder nomination =====
Hughes attended the Canucks training and preseason camp before the 2019–20 season. After the signing of Brock Boeser, Hughes was tested on the first unit of the powerplay alongside Boeser and J. T. Miller. After going scoreless to begin the season, Hughes recorded his first career NHL goal in their home opening game against the Los Angeles Kings while the Canucks were on a power play. He became the youngest Canuck defenseman since J. J. Daigneault to score a goal for the team. A month later, Hughes bruised his left knee in a game against the Anaheim Ducks on November 1, 2019. He returned to the lineup after missing one game, where he scored the game-tying goal in an eventual 2–1 overtime loss to the St. Louis Blues. As a result, he became the fourth under-twenty Canuck in franchise history to record 14 or more points by their 20th game. During a game on November 21, Hughes recorded three power-play assists in the 6–3 win. This achievement made him the first rookie defenseman in NHL history to record three power-play assists in multiple games in a season. By November 27, he became the first Canucks rookie defenseman to register three three-point games. It also made him one of the first rookies of the 2019–20 season to reach 20 points. Due to his successful start to the season, Hughes was listed as a "Last Man standing" option at the 2020 NHL All-Star Game, allowing fans to vote him into the competition. On January 11, in a 6–3 win over the Buffalo Sabres, Hughes became the sixth fastest defensemen in NHL history to reach 30 assists in 49 games or less. That same day, he was voted into the NHL All-Star Game along with Mitch Marner, David Perron, and T. J. Oshie. As a result, the Vancouver Canucks became the first team in the Expansion Era to have a rookie play in the All-Star Game in three consecutive seasons. At the NHL All-Star Skills Competition, Hughes partook in the Fastest Skater contest, finishing with a time of 14.263. The next day, Hughes became the second rookie defenseman to score a goal in the NHL All-Star Game.

Upon returning from the All-Star break, Hughes continued his record-breaking season with the Canucks. On February 27, he recorded an assist on J. T. Miller's power-play goal against the Ottawa Senators, replacing Boeser as the franchise record holder for most powerplay points in a season by a rookie. That assist was also his 43rd of the season, moving him into first place for most single assists by a rookie in franchise history. He was subsequently named Rookie of the Month for February. Although the 2019–20 season was eventually paused due to the coronavirus, Hughes ended his rookie season as the lead rookie in points league-wide, becoming the third rookie defensemen since Bobby Orr and Brian Leetch to do so in the modern era. As a result of his play, he was named a Calder Memorial Trophy finalist alongside Cale Makar and Dominik Kubalík.

Hughes returned to the Canucks for their Return to Play Initiative months following the conclusion of the regular season, saying he felt "as strong as I've ever been." During the play pause, he lived in Plymouth, Michigan with his family and played sports with his brothers daily to remain in shape. He made his postseason debut during the team's qualifying round against the Minnesota Wild and recorded his first multi-point playoff game on August 6, 2020, as the Canucks took a 2–1 lead in the series. As a result, he became the sixth youngest defenseman to record a three-assist playoff game and the youngest in team history. During the second round against the Vegas Golden Knights, Hughes set a new NHL record for most playoff assists by a rookie defenseman with 13 assists in 15 playoff games. After recording a goal and an assist during Game 6, he also surpassed the record for most points in a postseason by a rookie defenseman set by Cale Makar the night before. Following the Canucks elimination from the playoffs, Hughes was named to the All-Rookie Team, becoming the first Canucks defenseman since Mattias Öhlund in 1997–98 to be named on the team. Hughes would finish second in Calder Trophy voting to Cale Makar, becoming the third consecutive Canucks rookie to place in the top two for the award.

===== COVID-19, new contract, and setting records =====
Due to the COVID-19 pandemic, the 2020–21 season was pushed back until January 13, 2021, for a 56-game regular season. The Canucks were also temporarily realigned into the North Division where they would only compete against Canadian teams. Hughes began the season with eight assists through the team's nine games, becoming the fourth player in franchise history to reach this milestone in the same number of games. As the season continued, Hughes continued collecting points and matching NHL records. After collecting his 18th point on February 13 against the Calgary Flames, Hughes tied the NHL record for fourth-most points by an NHL defenseman in the first 18 games of a season since 1985–86. In March, Hughes became the seventh quickest defenseman in franchise history to reach the 25-point mark and later became the sixth fastest to exceed 30 points. On March 30, Hughes was one of 22 players on the Canucks who were infected with an aggressive Gamma variant of COVID-19. He returned to the ice on April 21, 2021, where he collected three points in a 6–3 win over the Toronto Maple Leafs. Preliminary contract discussion also began for Hughes and Elias Pettersson, who were both to become restricted free agents and the conclusion of the season. Shortly following his return to the lineup, Hughes tallied his 77th assist to tie Pettersson for the second-most assists before age 22 in franchise history and third-most overall points by a Canucks defenseman. Hughes finished the season leading all team defensemen in points and ranked third overall in scoring with three goals and 38 assists for 41 points. In recognition of his efforts, Hughes was awarded the Babe Pratt Trophy as the team's best defenseman.

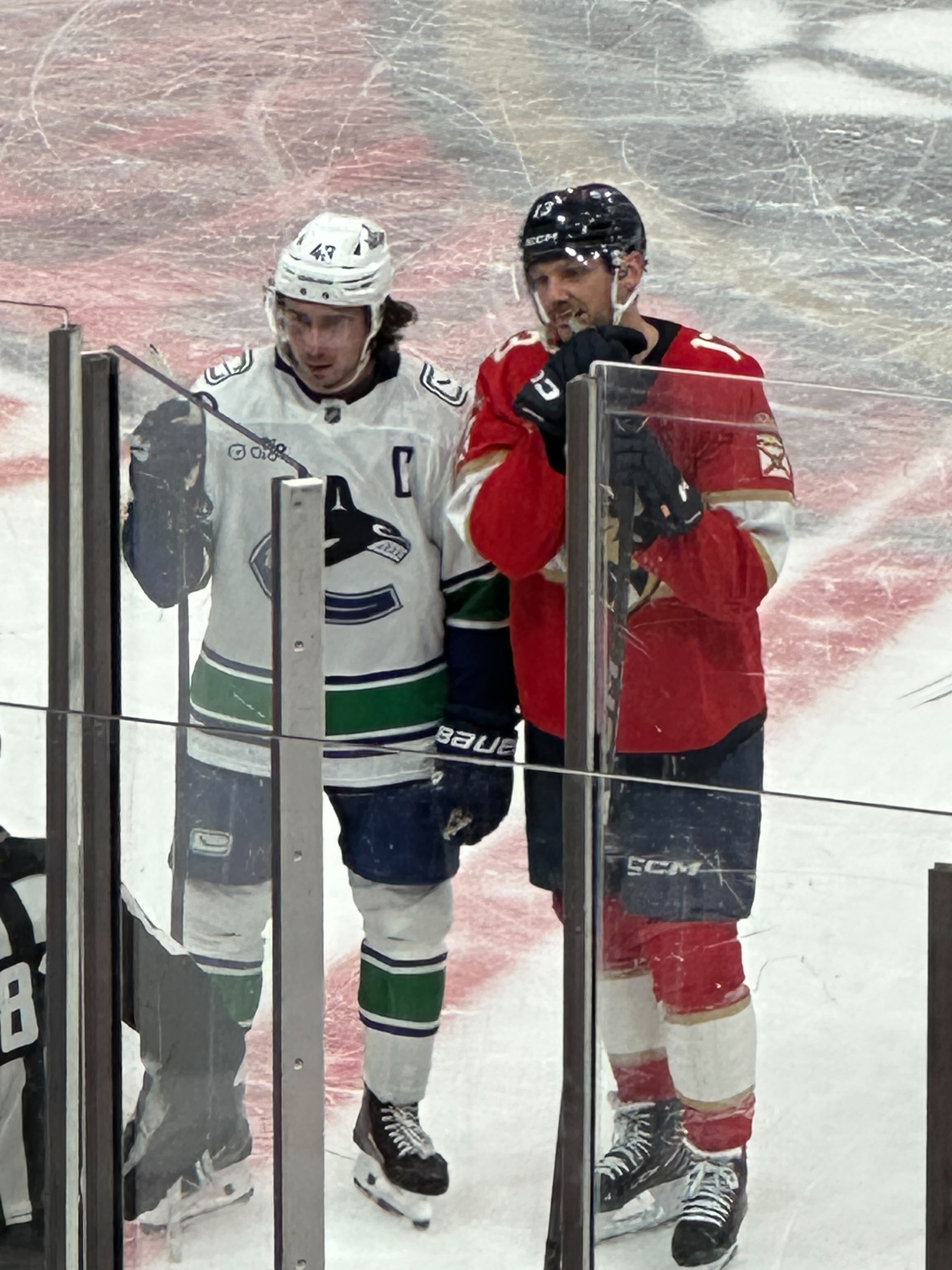
Hughes and Sam Reinhart of the Florida Panthers during a game in November 2025

As contract discussions continued into the following season, Hughes missed most of training camp and preseason games before signing a six-year, $47.1 million contract on October 1, 2021. He subsequently returned to the Canucks lineup on October 7 for a pre-season game against the Edmonton Oilers. During the regular season, Hughes set numerous franchise records and set career-highs in assists and points. On October 21, Hughes became the fastest defenseman in Canucks history to reach 100 points and the fastest active NHL defenseman. The following month, Hughes became the second-fastest Canuck to reach the 100 assist milestone following a game against the Montreal Canadiens on November 29. Two nights later, Hughes tallied a career-high four-points in a game against the Ottawa Senators to become the fifth defenseman in franchise history to record four assists in one game. Although Hughes was quickly amassing a career high in points, the Canucks struggled to win games and fired their head coach Travis Green after maintaining a losing 8–15–2 record. The Canucks replaced Green with Bruce Boudreau, who had previously worked with Hughes' father Jim while coaching the Manchester Monarchs. Following the hiring of Boudreau, Hughes and Pettersson approached him to play on the penalty kill.

Under Bruce Boudreau, the Canucks went on a seven-game win streak and Hughes amassed eight assists through Boudreau's first nine games. On January 21, 2022, Hughes collected his 30th assist in his 39th game of the season to become the second fastest Canucks defenseman to reach 30 assists in a season. On February 7, after tallying two goals and 32 assists in 45 games, Hughes was reinfected with COVID-19 and placed on the NHL's COVID-19 protocol list. Hughes missed three games before returning on February 17 for the Canucks' game against the San Jose Sharks, where he scored goal and an assist to help lead the Canucks to a 5–4 overtime win. As the Canucks began gaining momentum in an attempt to quality for the 2022 Stanley Cup playoffs, Hughes set a new franchise record for most points by defenseman in a single season. He surpassed the previous record holder Doug Lidster after tallying a goal and two assists in the Canucks win over the Seattle Kraken on April 27 to total 66 points. While the Canucks failed to qualify for the 2022 Stanley Cup playoffs, Hughes finished the 2021–22 season with eight goals and 60 assists for 68 points through 76 games. He also finished eighth in scoring among all NHL defensemen and fifth in power-play scoring with 31 points. Although Hughes was not one of the top three finalists for the Norris Trophy as the NHL's best defenseman, he received two fourth-place votes and three fifth-place votes. He also received three second place and 11 third place votes for the 2021–22 first and second All-Star teams.

Hughes followed up his career season by breaking his previous franchise record for most points by a defenseman in a single season. Leading up to the start of the 2022–23 season, Hughes admitted he wished to score more and develop a shoot-first mentality. Under coach Boudreau, Hughes accumulated five assists through five games although the Canucks began the season with a losing 0–5–2 record. After missing four games with a lower-body injury, Hughes returned to the Canucks lineup on October 31 for their game against the New Jersey Devils. On January 22, the Canucks fired Boudreau after he led the team to an 18–25–3 record to rank sixth in the Pacific Division and 14 points out of a playoff spot. On March 4, 2023, Hughes tallied two assists in the Canucks 4–1 win over the Toronto Maple Leafs to become the fastest defenseman in NHL history to reach the 200-assist milestone. He reached this milestone in his 263rd career NHL game, one fewer than the second place defenseman Brian Leetch.

===== Canucks captain =====
Before the start of the 2023–24 season, Hughes was named the 15th captain in Canucks history, making him both the youngest active captain in the NHL and the first American-born captain of the Canucks. Hughes and his defensive partner Filip Hronek played important roles in helping the Canucks find early success through October and November. On November 6, Hughes was named the NHL's First Star of the Week after tallying eight points over three games. A few days later, Hughes and Hronek became the third defensemen pairings in NHL history to each register 14 or more assists through the first 13 games of a season. Following a win over the San Jose Sharks on November 20, Hughes matched his career-high eight goals and became the first player to reach the 30-point mark in the 2023–24 NHL regular season. This also made him the third defenseman in NHL history to reach 30 points through the first 17 games of the season. The following month, Hughes became the first defenseman in the 2023–24 season to reach 40 points and the first Canucks defenseman to do so in less than 40 games. He also joined Miller and Pettersson as the third trio of teammates to reach 40 points in their teams' first 33 games since 1997. In recognition of his efforts, Hughes was named to the 2024 National Hockey League All-Star Game for the second time in his career. Finishing the regular season with 92 points, which led the league for defensemen, Hughes won the Norris Trophy at the end of the 2023–24 season, becoming the first Canucks player in franchise history to do so. In his first season as captain, the Canucks finished first in the Pacific Division and qualified for the playoffs for the first time since participating in the expanded 2020 playoffs during Hughes' rookie season. Hughes contributed 10 assists in 13 games during the 2024 Stanley Cup playoffs, in which the Canucks won their first round series in six games against the Nashville Predators, before losing their second round series in seven games to the Edmonton Oilers.

On November 5, 2024, Hughes tallied three assists during a 5–1 win over the Anaheim Ducks, becoming the third-fastest defenseman in NHL history to reach the 300-assist milestone, doing so in his 376th career NHL game. On December 1, Hughes surpassed Alexander Edler to become the Canucks' franchise leader in assists by a defenceman. The following day, Hughes was named the second NHL star of the week. He had 76 points in 68 games during the 2024–25 season, and was named a Norris Trophy finalist for the second time.

On October 11, 2025, Hughes recorded his 410th career point to become the Canucks all-time leader in points by a defenseman, surpassing the previous record of 409 by Alexander Edler, also achieving the mark in 490 less games played than Edler.

==== Minnesota Wild (2025–present) ====
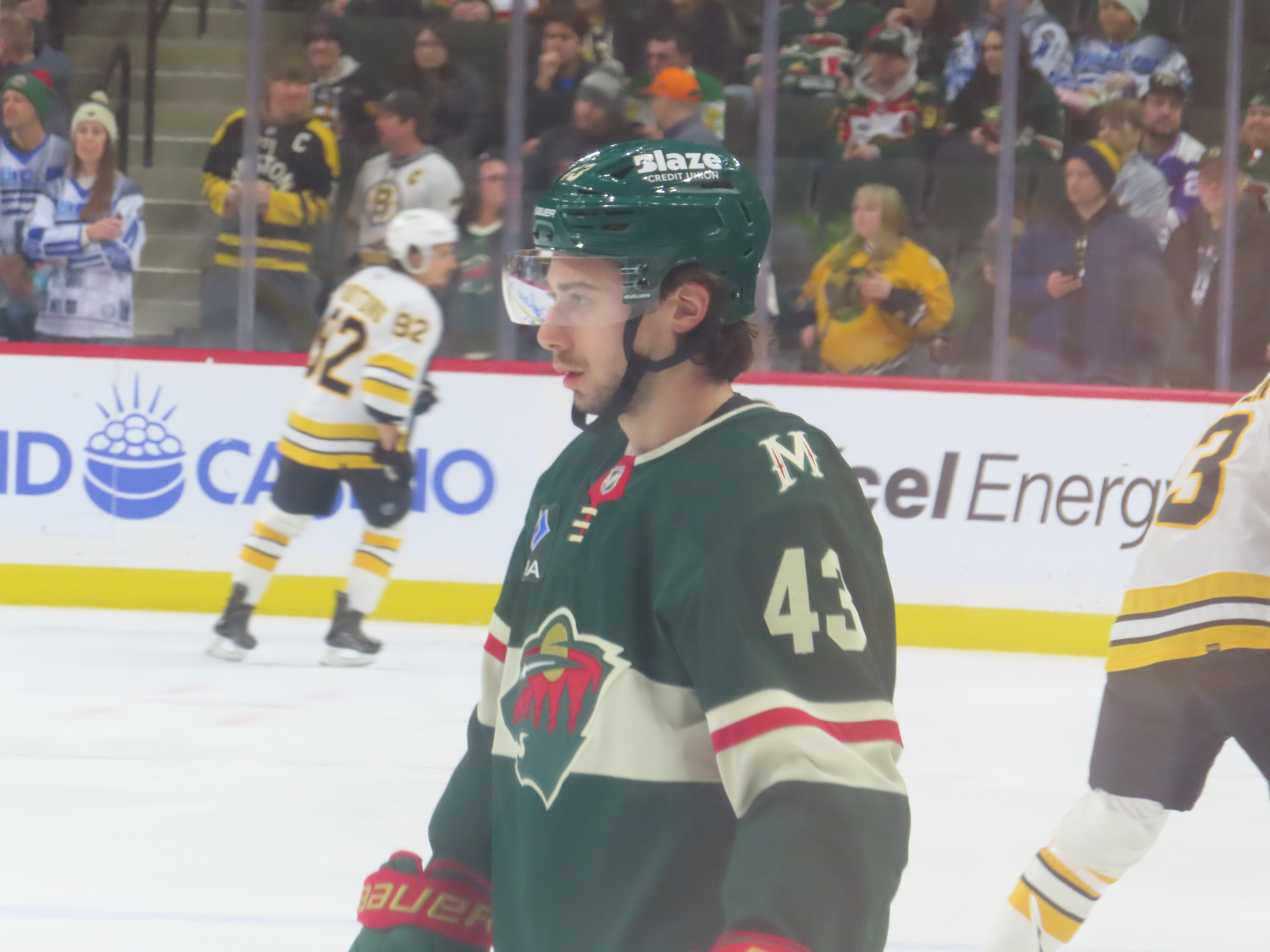
Hughes during the pre-game warmup prior to his debut with the Wild on December 14, 2025

On December 12, 2025, Hughes was traded to the Minnesota Wild for Marco Rossi, Zeev Buium, Liam Öhgren – all of whom were chosen by the Wild in the first round of their respective draft years – and a 2026 first-round pick. He suited up for his first game in Minnesota on December 14, and scored his first goal with the team that night in a 6–2 win. On January 19, 2026, Hughes became the fastest player to 20 points in franchise history, doing so in only 18 games, after he assisted on a Vladimir Tarasenko goal during the second period of a 6–3 win against the Toronto Maple Leafs.

Hughes played against the Canucks for the first time after the trade on April 2, stating that the game would not feel real until the puck drop and likened the feeling to playing against his brothers or former teammates. He drew criticism by some NHL analysts and fans after continuing that he did not know a lot of the players on the Canucks, highlighting the team's turnover, and was compared to Mark Messier by analyst Wyatt Arndt.

== International play ==
Medal record

Men's ice hockey

Representing the United States

Winter Olympics
Gold medal – first place	2026 Milano Cortina	

World Championships
Bronze medal – third place	2018 Denmark	

World Junior Championships
Silver medal – second place	2019 Canada	
Bronze medal – third place	2018 United States	

World U18 Championships
Gold medal – first place	2017 Slovakia	

Hughes has represented the United States internationally. In 2015, he was named to the United States team for the World U-17 Hockey Challenge. He was one of seven players from the Toronto Marlboros minor midget team to compete at this tournament, with all but Hughes representing Canada. Following that tournament, where the United States failed to place, Hughes participated at the under-17 Four Nations Tournament in Slovakia.

In 2017, Hughes played at the 2017 World U18 Championships, helping the United States under-18 team win a gold medal. He finished in the top five in scoring among team's defensemen with five points. He was later named to the United States junior team to compete at the 2018 World Junior Championships, helping his team win bronze.

A few months later, following the conclusion of his freshman season at Michigan, he was the youngest player named to the United States senior team to compete at the 2018 World Championship. At the age of 18, he was the only collegiate player on the roster and became the 33rd Michigan Wolverines player to compete at a World Championship tournament. Hughes again won bronze with the United States team, scoring two points in 10 games while averaging 12:13 minutes of ice time.

During his sophomore season at Michigan, Hughes was selected to compete at the 2019 World Junior Championships, alongside his brother Jack. They became only the third pair of brothers to compete for the United States at a World Juniors tournament, with the most recent pairing being Joey and Mikey Anderson in the 2018 World Junior Championships. On December 24, 2018, Hughes, along with Michigan teammate Josh Norris, were named alternate captains for the United States. The two players were two of five returning competitors from the 2018 World Junior Championships team. Hughes helped lead the team to the gold medal game where they lost 3–2 to Finland.

After the Vancouver Canucks' season ended, Hughes was one of 17 players named to the United States' roster for the 2019 World Championship.

On January 2, 2026, he was named to the United States' roster for the 2026 Winter Olympics. He scored his first Olympic goal for an overtime win versus Sweden in the quarterfinals. On February 22, Hughes' brother Jack scored the winning goal in overtime of the championship game against Canada, giving the United States their first Olympic gold medal since 1980. Hughes was voted the Best Defender of the tournament by the IIHF, and was also named to the Olympic All-Star Team. Additionally, the defenseman broke the record for most assists by an American in a single Olympic tournament with NHL players and also tied the record for the most points by a defenseman in a single Olympic tournament with NHL players.

== Player profile ==
"The kind of defenceman I love playing with is a good-skating, puck-moving defenceman — and that's exactly what they're getting. He could be a Norris Trophy defenceman with his offensive instincts. He's a great skater; he can skate around anybody. And he's a great passer. Maybe a Duncan Keith but a better skater."

— Dylan Larkin of the Detroit Red Wings on the Canucks drafting Hughes.

Described as a smooth-skating and mobile player, Hughes says he models his game after NHL defensemen Duncan Keith and Kris Letang. Before he was drafted Dan Ninkovich, a performance coach that had known Hughes since he was 13, highlighted his ability to use milliseconds to calculate what to do with the puck to make the best play almost as if he can slow down time.

After being drafted by the Canucks, general manager Jim Benning cited his dynamic skating and ability to quickly transition the puck as reasons for drafting him, seeing it as ideal for the team. Andrew Berkshire of Sportsnet described Hughes as one of the best young defensemen in the NHL. At Hughes' first NHL All-Star game, Pacific Division coach and NHL great Wayne Gretzky stated, "That young lad's a defenseman? That's better hands than I had."

== Personal life ==
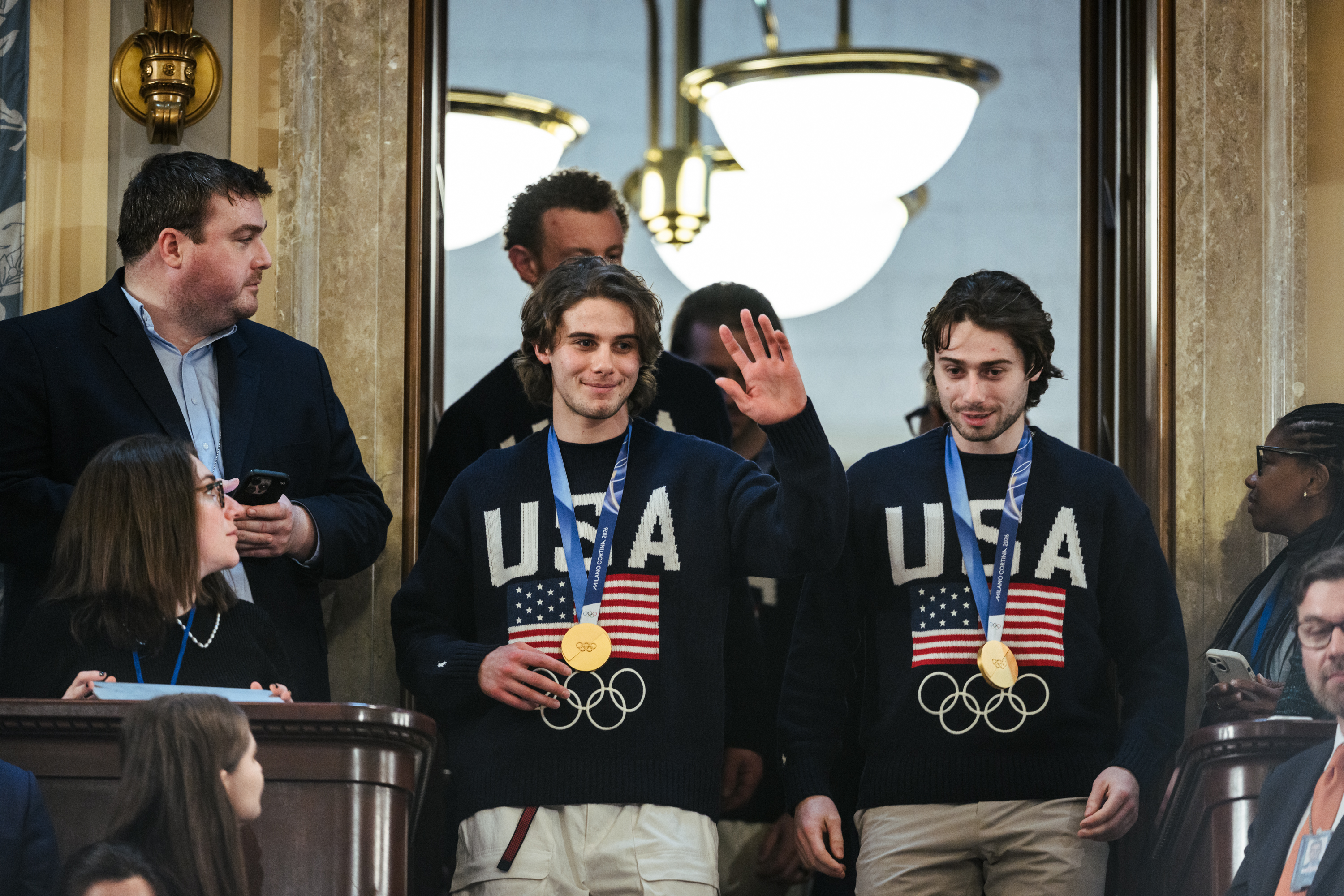
Hughes (right) entering the State of the Union speech next to brother Jack in February 2026

Hughes has two younger brothers, Jack and Luke, who also play hockey and were drafted by the New Jersey Devils. Jack was drafted first overall in the 2019 NHL entry draft and Luke was drafted fourth overall by the Devils in the 2021 NHL entry draft.

His uncle Marty and his cousin, Teddy Doherty, were also both involved in hockey. Marty last played in the British National League for the Dundee Stars, and Teddy last played for the Manchester Monarchs in the ECHL. His maternal uncle is sociologist Adam S. Weinberg, the president of Denison University.

Hughes has dual American and Canadian citizenship.

In March 2023, Hughes spoke in support of the Canucks' upcoming Pride Night, stating that everyone was welcome in the organization. He added that while he respected individual beliefs, he had not anticipated any players opting out of the event. Prior to the 2026 Winter Olympics Hughes was questioned about the NHL's attituded towards LGBTQ players and fans alongside the popularity of queer hockey romance Heated Rivalry. Hughes stated that while he had not seen it, he had heard positive opinions on the show and that he was always a supporter, and that the players skills was what mattered to him the most.

While speaking with his brother Jack, after online backlash regarding the inclusion of FBI director Kash Patel and laughing to President Trump's comments of being impeached if he did not invite the U.S. women's team, Hughes stated he did not know what he was allowed to say at first. He continued that he was extremely happy for the women's team gold medal win and that it was not every day one was invited to visit the White House. Hughes attended the State of the Union and toured the White House with a majority of his team. Hughes was also photographed wearing a Trump USA hat with press secretary Karoline Leavitt, during the team's visit, causing additional online backlash. Following the Winter Olympics, and White House and State of the Union visits, Hughes and his brother Jack were guests on Saturday Night Live and The Tonight Show, where they were joined by women's team members Hilary Knight and Megan Keller.

== Career statistics ==
=== Regular season and playoffs ===
			Regular season					Playoffs
Season	Team	League	GP	G	A	Pts	PIM	GP	G	A	Pts	PIM
2015–16	US NTDP Juniors	USHL	34	4	7	11	10	—	—	—	—	—
2015–16	US NTDP U17	USDP	57	7	17	24	24	—	—	—	—	—
2016–17	US NTDP Juniors	USHL	26	4	22	26	10	—	—	—	—	—
2016–17	US NTDP U18	USDP	65	10	43	53	30	—	—	—	—	—
2017–18	University of Michigan	B1G	37	5	24	29	26	—	—	—	—	—
2018–19	University of Michigan	B1G	31	5	28	33	16	—	—	—	—	—
2018–19	Vancouver Canucks	NHL	5	0	3	3	2	—	—	—	—	—
2019–20	Vancouver Canucks	NHL	68	8	45	53	22	17	2	14	16	2
2020–21	Vancouver Canucks	NHL	56	3	38	41	22	—	—	—	—	—
2021–22	Vancouver Canucks	NHL	76	8	60	68	28	—	—	—	—	—
2022–23	Vancouver Canucks	NHL	78	7	69	76	34	—	—	—	—	—
2023–24	Vancouver Canucks	NHL	82	17	75	92	38	13	0	10	10	6
2024–25	Vancouver Canucks	NHL	68	16	60	76	29	—	—	—	—	—
2025–26	Vancouver Canucks	NHL	26	2	21	23	12	—	—	—	—	—
2025–26	Minnesota Wild	NHL	48	5	48	53	20	11	4	11	15	4
NHL totals			507	66	419	485	207	41	6	35	41	12

=== International ===
Year	Team	Event	Result	GP	G	A	Pts	PIM
2015	United States	U17	5th	5	1	9	10	6
2017	United States	WJC18	1st place, gold medalist(s)	7	1	4	5	4
2018	United States	WJC	3rd place, bronze medalist(s)	7	0	3	3	6
2018	United States	WC	3rd place, bronze medalist(s)	10	0	2	2	2
2019	United States	WJC	2nd place, silver medalist(s)	7	0	2	2	0
2019	United States	WC	7th	8	1	9	10	0
2026	United States	OG	1st place, gold medalist(s)	6	1	7	8	0
Junior totals				26	2	18	20	16
Senior totals				24	1	16	17	2

== Awards and honors ==
Award	Year	Ref
USHL
All-USHL Second Team	2017	
College
All-Big Ten Freshman Team	2018	
All-Big Ten Second Team	2018	
All-Big Ten First Team	2019	
AHCA First-Team All-American	2019	
NHL
NHL Rookie of the Month	February 2020	
NHL All-Rookie Team	2020	
NHL All-Star Game	2020, 2024	
James Norris Memorial Trophy	2024	
NHL First All-Star team	2024	
EA Sports NHL cover athlete	2025	
Second All-Star team	2025	
Vancouver Canucks
Babe Pratt Trophy	2020, 2021, 2022, 2023, 2024, 2025	
Cyclone Taylor Trophy	2025	
Cyrus H. McLean Trophy	2025	
Three Stars Award	2025	
Pavel Bure Most Exciting Player Award	2025	
Daniel & Henrik Sedin Award	2025	
International
Winter Olympics Best Defender	2026	
Winter Olympics All-Star Team	2026	

== Records ==
=== NHL ===
==== Vancouver Canucks ====
- Most assists per game (0.81)
- Best single-season expected plus/minus (40)
- Best single-season plus/minus (38 in the 2023–24 season)
- Most total goals on-ice for in a single-season (162 in the 2023–24 season)
- Best expected plus/minus in a single-season (15.2 in the 2024–25 season)
- Most defensive point shares in a single-season (6.5 in the 2024–25 season)

=== Olympics ===
- Most assists by an American in a single Olympic tournament with NHL players (7 in 2026)
- Most points by a defenseman in a single Olympic tournament with NHL players (8, tied with two others)
- Second-most career assists by an American defenseman during the Olympics with NHL players (7, tied with one other)

== See also ==
- List of select Jewish ice hockey players

Sporting positions
Preceded by Bo Horvat	Vancouver Canucks captain 2023–2025	Succeeded by TBD
Awards and achievements
Preceded by Elias Pettersson	Vancouver Canucks first-round draft pick 2018	Succeeded by Vasily Podkolzin
Preceded by Erik Karlsson	James Norris Memorial Trophy winner 2024	Succeeded by Cale Makar
