= 1992 World Ice Hockey Championships =

1992 World Ice Hockey Championships may refer to:

- 1992 Men's World Ice Hockey Championships
- 1992 IIHF Women's World Championship
- 1992 World Junior Ice Hockey Championships
