= Ellen Weinberg-Hughes =

American ice hockey player

- Born: July 8, 1969 (age 57) St. Louis, Missouri, U.S.
- Position: Defense
- Shot: Right
- Played for: New Hampshire Wildcats
- National team: United States
- Playing career: 1986–1992
Medal record
Women's ice hockey
Representing United States
World Championship
Silver medal – second place	1992 Finland
Association football career
- Positions: Midfielder; forward
College career
Years	Team	Apps	(Gls)
1986–1990	New Hampshire Wildcats	70	(11)

Ellen Weinberg-Hughes (née Weinberg; born July 8, 1969) is an American former ice hockey player. She competed internationally for the US women's national team at the 1992 Women's World Championship, capturing a silver medal while being named to the tournament's all-star team. She played collegiate hockey, lacrosse and soccer for the University of New Hampshire. She was inducted into the UNH Athletic Hall of Fame in 2012. After her playing career was over, she served as an assistant coach at UNH for the soccer and ice hockey teams, while attending graduate school. She also served as an advisor to Norway's women's hockey team in 1994.

== Early life ==
Weinberg-Hughes was born on July 8, 1969, in St. Louis, Missouri, and was raised in Dallas, Texas. She is the daughter of Penny (Klamon) and Dr. Warren Abraham Weinberg, who was a pediatric neurologist, faculty member, and medical researcher at the University of Texas Southwestern Medical School. Her brother is sociologist Adam S. Weinberg, the president of Denison University. Her family is Jewish.

Weinberg-Hughes stated that due to there being no girls teams in the Dallas area she began playing ice hockey with the boys teams, and told a local TV station at 12-years-old her goal was to become a professional hockey player. In 1984, Weinberg-Hughes competed and won an international tournament with her high school club soccer team, the Dallas Stings in Xi'an, China. During her time with the Stings, she played with Carla Overbeck and Mia Hamm and roomed with Brandi Chastain.

== Athletic and professional career ==
=== Collegiate career ===
While recruited to the University of New Hampshire (UNH) for soccer, Weinberg-Hughes competed in three sports (ice hockey, soccer, and lacrosse) during her collegiate career. She was a UNH Athlete of the Year finalist in 1991, and was inducted into the University of New Hampshire Athletic Hall of Fame in 2012.

Weinberg-Hughes was unable to compete during the 1988-1989 academic year due to an injury. During this redshirt year, she did a broadcast internship. She recovered and returned to collegiate sports for the 1989-1990 and 1990-1991 academic years.

==== Soccer ====
Weinberg-Hughes was recruited to UNH for soccer and matriculated in 1986. She recalled that only about 35 programs in the country offered scholarships for women's soccer at this time, and 1986 was the first year that UNH offered them. Weinberg-Hughes played midfield and forward.

As a freshman, Weinberg-Hughes helped her team to the Eastern College Athletic Conference (ECAC) championship game in 1986, and received All-New England Team recognition for this feat. She served as team captain during her senior year in 1990, and led her team to the ECAC final game. Her other soccer accolades included NSCAA All-Region Team and ISAA Senior All-Star Game. Overall, across 70 games, she tallied 38 points on 11 goals and 16 assists.

==== Lacrosse ====
Despite having never played lacrosse prior to college, Weinberg-Hughes made the varsity team in her freshman year. As a freshman, she was a member of the UNH women's team that made it to the national semi-finals.

==== Ice hockey ====
As a walk-on, Weinberg-Hughes was not guaranteed a spot on the UNH women's ice hockey team when she started college. However, she recalled then head coach, Russ McCurdy, offering her a place on the team the first time he saw her skate at the end of the 1986 fall semester. Despite attending UNH on a soccer scholarship, she soon considered hockey her primary sport.

Weinberg-Hughes played defense, and was noted to be a smooth skater and good passer. The team won the ECAC championships three times while she was on the team (1987, 1990, and 1991), including in her senior season when she served as captain. She was also named to the 1991 ECAC Division I Women's Ice Hockey All-Start Team, which was the highest honor in women's collegiate hockey at the time. Overall, in the 79 games she played, Weinberg-Hughes scored 6 goals and added 32 assists.

===== Coaching =====
After completing her collegiate eligibility, Weinberg-Hughes stayed at UNH to pursue a graduate degree. During this time, she served as an assistant coach to the women's ice hockey and soccer teams.

=== International ice hockey career ===
==== Playing career ====
In 1992, Weinberg-Hughes was named to the US women's hockey team for the 1992 Women's World Championship in Tampere, Finland, led by her former head coach, Russ McCurdy. The team won their first four games, beating Switzerland (17–0), Norway (9–1), Finland (5–3), and Sweden (6–4) in the semifinals, before losing to Canada in the finals (0–8). Weinberg-Hughes played in all five tournament games, recording 4 assists. Team USA captured a silver medal at the tournament, and Weinberg-Hughes was one of the six players named to the tournament all-star team at its conclusion. The other named players were Cammi Granato (United States), Angela James (Canada), Geraldine Heaney (Canada), Riika Sallinen (Finland), and Manon Rheaume (Canada).

In 1996, upon being named head coach for the 1998 US women's Olympic hockey team, Ben Smith invited Weinberg-Hughes and other previous women's hockey collegiate athletes to train for a smaller international tournament. During training, Weinberg-Hughes injured her knee and required ACL, MCL, and meniscus surgery. This injury ended her playing career.

In 2024, she was inducted into the International Jewish Sports Hall of Fame for her achievements in ice hockey.

==== Ambassador for women's hockey ====
Three months after the world championship, the IOC announced that women's hockey would be included for the first time in the 1998 Winter Olympics in Nagano, Japan, rather than the 1994 Winter Olympics in Lillehammer, Norway as many players had hoped.

Following this announcement, the Norwegian Ice Hockey Federation asked USA Hockey to send a women's hockey ambassador to help grow the game. Due to her success in the 1992 Women's World Championship, Weinberg-Hughes was asked to serve in this advising role. Ahead of the 1994 Lillehammer Olympics, Weinberg-Hughes moved to Oslo to start working with the Norwegian Ice Hockey Federation. In a 2018 interview with the New York Times, she recalled traveling to small towns to teach girls how to play hockey.

==== Development consulting ====
In 2023, Weinberg-Hughes began working as a player development consultant for the US Women's Ice Hockey national team. She has been credited with helping the team win gold at the 2023 and 2025 World Championships. Notably, the US Women's Ice Hockey national team has medalled at every single Olympics since the sport was first included in 1998, and Weinberg-Hughes also helped the team win their 3rd Olympic gold at the 2026 Winter Olympics in Milan, Italy. Amid backlash regarding President Trump's comments about the US Olympic women's hockey team and the responses from the US Olympic men's team, Weinberg-Hughes spoke out stating that the backlash was nonsense as both teams shared camaraderie and synergy with the women's team cheering on the men's and vice versa.

=== Broadcasting career ===
After her playing career ended in 1996, Weinberg-Hughes worked for ESPN, where she reported on soccer and hockey. In this job, she travelled to the 1998 Winter Olympics to report on the women's olympic hockey team, who won gold, and attended the 1999 Women's World Cup. Later, Weinberg-Hughes reported on soccer for the Big Ten Network.

In 2009, following her husband's transition from a coaching role to a player development role with a less flexible schedule, combined with her three son's busy hockey schedules, Weinberg-Hughes stepped back from her broadcasting career.

== Personal life ==
Weinberg-Hughes' husband, Jim, is a former ice hockey player and coach who has worked in the Toronto Marlies and Toronto Maple Leafs organizations. They have three sons, all of whom were drafted in the first round of their respective National Hockey League drafts. Quinn was drafted seventh overall in the 2018 NHL entry draft by the Vancouver Canucks and currently plays for the Minnesota Wild. Jack was drafted first overall in the 2019 NHL entry draft by the New Jersey Devils. Her youngest son, Luke, was drafted fourth overall by the New Jersey Devils in the 2021 NHL entry draft. Weinberg-Hughes taught all three of her sons how to skate. Her children were all born in the U.S., due to Weinberg-Hughes' husband's work, but they were largely raised in Mississauga, Ontario.

== See also ==
- List of select Jewish ice hockey players
