= Carlee Turner =

American ice hockey player

- Born: October 23, 1997 (age 28) Scottsdale, Arizona, U.S.
- Height: 5 ft 7 in (170 cm)
- Position: Forward
- Shoots: Right
- NWHL team Former teams: Boston Pride: UNH Wildcats women's ice hockey
- National team: United States
- Playing career: 2013–present

Carlee Turner (born October 23, 1997) is an American ice hockey player who currently plays for the Boston Pride in the National Women's Hockey League.

== Career ==
As a junior player, Turner played 86 games for the North American Hockey Academy Winter Hawks of the Junior Women's Hockey League. She scored 48 of her 75 career points in her senior season when she served as team captain.

Across 139 NCAA games at the University of New Hampshire, she scored 73 points. As a senior she served as team captain of the UNH Wildcats, leading the team in faceoff win percentage (60.8%) and power play goals (5). Turner often centered Meghara McManus and Taylor Wenczkowski who will be reuniting with her as familiar faces who also signed with the Boston Pride for the 2021 season. She displayed in interest in film study and statistics of hockey during her time at UNH.

Turner signed a one-year deal as a free agent with the Boston Pride on June 12, 2020.

== Personal life ==
Turner majored in medical and veterinary sciences at the University of New Hampshire. She currently works as a medical assistant in Boston.

== Career stats ==
			Regular Season					Playoffs
Season	Team	League	GP	G	A	Pts	PIM	GP	G	A	Pts	PIM
2013–14	NAHA White	JWHL	29	6	9	15	16	-	-	-	-	-
2014-15	NAHA White	JWHL	28	7	5	12	36	-	-	-	-	-
2015-16	NAHA White	JWHL	29	21	27	48	8	-	-	-	-	-
2016–17	University of New Hampshire	NCAA	35	3	14	17	40	-	-	-	-	-
2017-18	University of New Hampshire	NCAA	35	9	11	20	36	-	-	-	-	-
2018-19	University of New Hampshire	NCAA	36	8	8	16	26	-	-	-	-	-
2019–20	University of New Hampshire	NCAA	33	7	13	20	16	-	-	-	-	-
2020-21	Boston Pride	NWHL
NWHL totals

== Honors ==
- 2019-20 Sue Merz Award (7th Player) for the UNH Wildcats team
- 2019-20 One of three Wildcats players to earn the Dr. Allison Edgar Academic Award for Excellence
- 2016-17 Hockey East All Academic Team
- 2015-16 Named the JWHL Player of the Year
