= Colleen Coyne =

American ice hockey player

- Born: September 19, 1971 (age 55) Falmouth, Massachusetts, U.S.
- Height: 5 ft 3 in (160 cm)
- Weight: 130 lb (59 kg; 9 st 4 lb)
- Position: Defense
- Shot: Left
- Hockey East team: New Hampshire
- National team: United States
- Playing career: 1990–1998
Medal record
Event	1st	2nd	3rd
Olympic Games	1	0	0
World Championship	0	3	0
Total	1	3	0
Women's ice hockey
Representing United States
Olympic Games
Gold medal – first place	1998 Nagano	Team
World Championship
Silver medal – second place	1992 Finland	Team
Silver medal – second place	1994 United States	Team
Silver medal – second place	1997 Canada	Team

Colleen M. Coyne (born September 19, 1971) is an American ice hockey player. She won a gold medal at the 1998 Winter Olympics.

== Playing career ==
Coyne attended Tabor Academy in Marion, Massachusetts for high school. She went on to play as a standout, all-league defenseman for the University of New Hampshire Wildcats. Throughout her career, she was a key part of the U.S. defense, representing the country on four U.S. Women's National Teams and two U.S. Women's Select Teams. At the 1998 Winter Olympics in Nagano, she posted an impressive plus-7 rating. In 1994, she was also highlighted on a trading card (1994 Classic Women of Hockey #W26).

== Hockey administration ==
In 2005, Coyne was chosen to represent athletes on the USA Hockey Board of Directors, and in 2008, she was elected to the organization's executive committee. She also serves on the board of directors for Celebrities For Charities. During the 2010–11 season of the Canadian Women's Hockey League, she was appointed to the league's Board of Directors.

In 2021, she was appointed president of the Boston Pride, a team in the National Women's Hockey League (now the Premier Hockey Federation). In this role, she oversaw business operations, strategic growth, and community outreach, aiming to strengthen the team's presence and promote women's hockey at all levels.

== Personal ==
In October 2007, she was introduced as a contributor to USCHO.com and its online Game of the Week broadcasts. Professionally, Coyne works in the social media industry and has held positions at companies including Groove Networks, Microsoft, and HubSpot since 2006.

== Volunteer work ==
- World Fit
