= Jack Hughes =

American ice hockey player (born 2001)

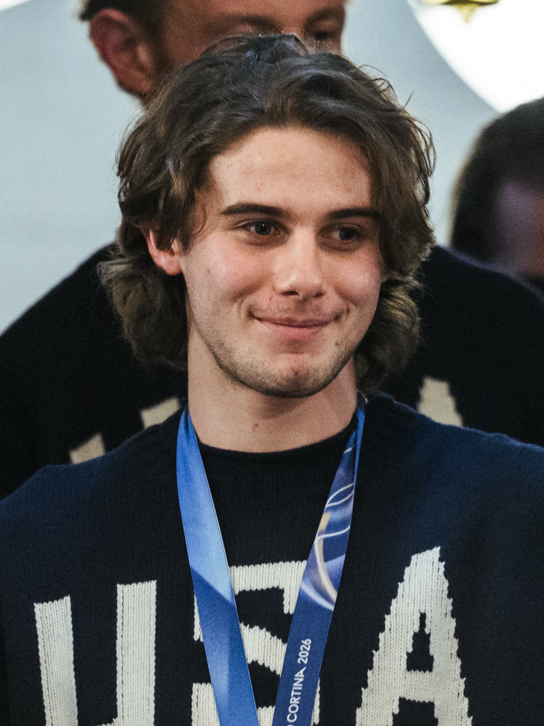
- Hughes at the State of the Union Address in 2026
- Born: May 14, 2001 (age 25) Orlando, Florida, U.S.
- Height: 5 ft 11 in (180 cm)
- Weight: 175 lb (79 kg; 12 st 7 lb)
- Position: Center
- Shoots: Left
- NHL team: New Jersey Devils
- National team: United States
- NHL draft: 1st overall, 2019; New Jersey Devils
- Playing career: 2019–present

Jack Rowden Hughes (born May 14, 2001) is an American professional ice hockey player who is a center and alternate captain for the New Jersey Devils of the National Hockey League (NHL). A product of the U.S. National Development Team, Hughes was drafted first overall by the Devils in the 2019 NHL entry draft.

Hughes has represented the United States men's national team internationally. He was a member of the United States team that won the gold medal at the 2026 Winter Olympics, and scored the game-winning goal in overtime of the gold medal match against Canada.

== Early life ==
Hughes was born in Orlando, Florida, and grew up in Toronto, Ontario, before relocating with his family to Michigan for his high school years while playing for the US NTDP. Hughes is Jewish, had a bar mitzvah, and grew up celebrating Passover. His mother, Ellen Weinberg-Hughes, is Jewish and his father, Jim Hughes, is Catholic, and he studied at Iona Catholic Secondary School. He graduated from one of the Plymouth-Canton Educational Park high schools in Canton, Michigan.

Hughes comes from a family of ice hockey athletes. He cited his favorite player as Patrick Kane due to their similar smaller stature. Hughes played a variety of sports growing up, including ice hockey and baseball. His older brother, Quinn, was drafted seventh overall in the 2018 NHL entry draft by the Vancouver Canucks. His younger brother, Luke, was drafted fourth overall by the Devils in the 2021 NHL entry draft. Their father is a former ice hockey player and team captain for Providence College, an assistant coach for the Boston Bruins, and the director of player development for the Toronto Maple Leafs. His mother played ice hockey, lacrosse, and soccer at the University of New Hampshire and, in 2012, was inducted into the University of New Hampshire Athletics Hall of Fame. She also played for the United States women's national ice hockey team, and won a silver medal at the 1992 World Championship.

His uncle Marty, and his cousin, Teddy Doherty, were also both involved in ice hockey. Marty last played in the British National League for the Dundee Stars, and Teddy last played for the Manchester Monarchs of the ECHL. His maternal uncle is sociologist Adam S. Weinberg, the president of Denison University.

== Playing career ==
=== Minor and junior career ===
While playing with the Mississauga Rebels of the Greater Toronto Hockey League (GTHL), Hughes applied for exceptional player status to be able to enter the Canadian Hockey League a year early. After his application was denied, he played his final year with the Toronto Marlboros, putting up 159 points.

After completing his minor career with the Marlboros, Hughes was drafted eighth overall by the Mississauga Steelheads in the Ontario Hockey League, despite his commitment to the U.S. National Team Development Program (USNTDP). Hughes kept his commitment and played with the USNTDP for the 2017–18 season. Splitting his time between the U17 and U18 teams, he put up 116 points, nearly beating Auston Matthews's record. At the conclusion of the 2017–18 season, Hughes was awarded the Dave Tyler Junior Player of the Year Award as the best American-born player in junior ice hockey.

During the 2018–19 season, Hughes broke the NTDP all-time points record that was previously held by Clayton Keller. In a 12–4 win over the Green Bay Gamblers on March 15, 2019, he recorded five points to give him 190 overall. In the same game, teammate Cole Caufield broke the NTDP record for most goals.

=== New Jersey Devils ===
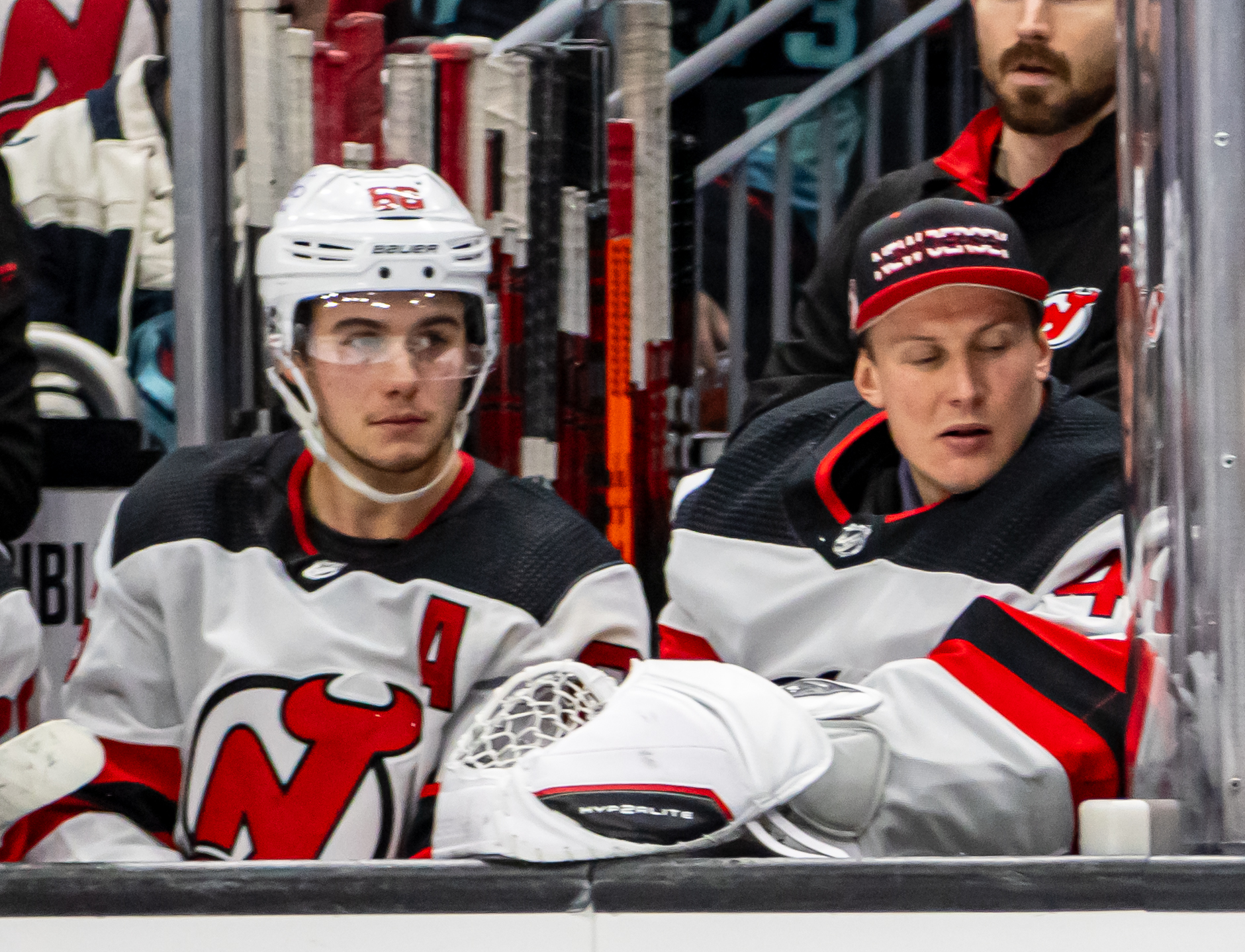
Hughes (left) on the Devils bench during a December 2023 game

On June 21, 2019, at the 2019 NHL entry draft, Hughes was selected first overall by the New Jersey Devils. On July 12, Hughes signed a three-year entry-level contract with the Devils. Hughes recorded his first career NHL point on October 17, in a game against the New York Rangers. In doing so, he became the third-youngest player in franchise history to record a point. Two days later, he recorded his first career NHL goal in a 1–0 win over the Vancouver Canucks and his older brother, Quinn.

In the first game of the 2021–22 season, on October 15, 2021, against the Chicago Blackhawks, Hughes scored an overtime goal to win the game 4–3, his second goal of the game, and tossed his stick into the crowd in an iconic celebration that was later replicated by Anaheim Ducks forward and former NTDP linemate Trevor Zegras, and then again by Hughes at the All-Star Game. On November 30, 2021, Hughes signed an eight-year, $64 million contract extension with the Devils. The season was considered a breakout year for Hughes, despite missing seventeen games in October after dislocating his shoulder. He was selected to his first NHL All-Star Game in 2022, becoming the first player from the 2019 NHL draft class to be selected as an All-Star. In early April 2022, after scoring a new career high of 26 goals and 30 assists in 49 games, the season ended on a disappointing note when Hughes sustained an MCL sprain after a hit by New York Islanders right wing Oliver Wahlstrom, as a result of which he missed the final 13 games.

The 2022–23 season saw Hughes hitting career highs in goals (43), assists (56) and points (99), while leading the Devils to third in the NHL and a franchise-high 52 wins. Hughes' 43 goals placed him top-ten in the NHL among goal-scorers, while his 99 points set a franchise record for most points in a season. Hughes was selected for his second career All-Star Game and qualified for the Stanley Cup playoffs for the first time in his career. His franchise-record 99th point, which he recorded in the final game of the 2022–23 regular season, was an assist on the overtime game-winner and first career goal by his brother, Luke Hughes, who had just joined the Devils one game prior. Hughes was also nominated for the Lady Byng Memorial Trophy, an award granted to the player exhibiting the best "sportsmanship and gentlemanly conduct combined with a high standard of playing ability".

In his playoff debut against the New York Rangers, Hughes scored his first playoff goal on a penalty shot against goaltender Igor Shesterkin in a 5–1 loss at home in Game 1. Hughes' goal made him only the fourth player in NHL history to score their first career postseason goal on a penalty shot. Hughes went on to have three goals and five points in the series, with the Devils eliminating the Rangers in seven games and advancing to the Second Round for the first time since the 2011–12 season. They were eliminated in the second round in five games by the Carolina Hurricanes.

The first six games of the 2023–24 season saw Hughes put up 17 points, a total that had not been reached as quickly since Mario Lemieux in 1995–96, who also scored 17 in six games. On November 3, 2023, during the Devils' 4–1 loss to the St. Louis Blues, Hughes fell into the boards at high speed and left the game with a shoulder injury. He returned to play on November 18, recording a goal and an assist in a 5–3 loss against the New York Rangers. On December 16, Hughes recorded his 100th NHL goal in his 267th NHL game, becoming the fastest Devil to reach the 100-goal milestone and the second-fastest in franchise history. In January 2024, Hughes was named to his third career and third consecutive All-Star Game, where he, his brother Quinn, and Michael Bublé were named co-captains of one of the teams. Hughes sustained an upper-body injury for the second time that season on January 5, when he fell awkwardly late in a 4–2 victory over the Chicago Blackhawks, and was unable to participate in the All-Star Game. He returned to play on February 8, after missing 11 games. On April 9, it was announced that Hughes would undergo shoulder surgery and would miss the remainder of the season. He finished the season with 27 goals and 74 points in 62 games.

On November 15, 2025, Hughes underwent surgery on his finger after cutting it on glass at a team dinner two nights earlier in what coach Sheldon Keefe described as a "freak accident". As of that date, the expected recovery time was eight weeks. He returned to play on December 21, scoring the lone goal in a 3–1 loss against the Buffalo Sabres.

== International play ==
Medal record

Men's ice hockey

Representing the United States

Winter Olympics
Gold medal – first place	2026 Milano Cortina	

4 Nations Face-Off
Runner-up	2025 Canada/United States	

World Junior Championship
Silver medal – second place	2019 Canada	

World U18 Championship
Silver medal – second place	2018 Russia	
Bronze medal – third place	2019 Sweden	

Hughes played two under-17 tournaments representing the United States, the 2017 Four Nations Cup, where he scored two goals and six points in six games, and the 2017 World U-17 Hockey Challenge, where he scored five goals and fifteen points in ten games. The Americans would claim gold at each event.

At the 2018 World U18 Championships, Hughes led the tournament with seven assists and twelve points in seven games, and was selected as the tournament MVP, named to the media all-star team, and chosen as the best forward of the tournament.

On December 23, 2018, Hughes was selected to compete at the 2019 World Junior Championships alongside his brother Quinn. Hughes missed three games of the tournament with an undisclosed injury but returned to the lineup in time to help the United States beat the Czech Republic in the quarterfinals. In his return, Hughes recorded an assist on a goal by Noah Cates. Hughes ended the tournament with four assists as the United States lost to Finland in the gold medal game. He later competed at the 2019 World U18 Championships, where he broke Alexander Ovechkin's goals scored record as the United States won a bronze medal.

On May 1, 2019, Hughes was named to the United States senior team to compete at the 2019 World Championship, again alongside Quinn. At the age of 17, Hughes became the youngest player to represent the United States at an IIHF World Championship tournament. On December 6, Hughes' NHL team, the New Jersey Devils, announced they would not release him to play for the United States at the 2020 World Junior Championships.

In 2025, Hughes represented the United States at the 4 Nations Face-Off tournament, where they finished in second place. Hughes picked up one assist in four games.

On January 2, 2026, he was named to the United States' roster for the 2026 Winter Olympics. On February 22, he scored the winning goal in overtime of the gold medal game against Canada, giving the U.S. Olympic team their first men's ice hockey gold medal since the 1980 Winter Olympics. Hughes played on despite being high-sticked in the mouth by Canadian forward Sam Bennett in the third period and losing multiple teeth. The puck that Hughes scored with to win the gold medal game was collected and added to the Hockey Hall of Fame (HHOF) Olympics 2026 collection. Hughes initially expressed dissatisfaction, wishing to present the puck to his father and keep it in the family, but then clarified his stance following backlash, stating he was honored by its inclusion in the HHOF exhibit and would not pursue the matter further.

== Personal life ==
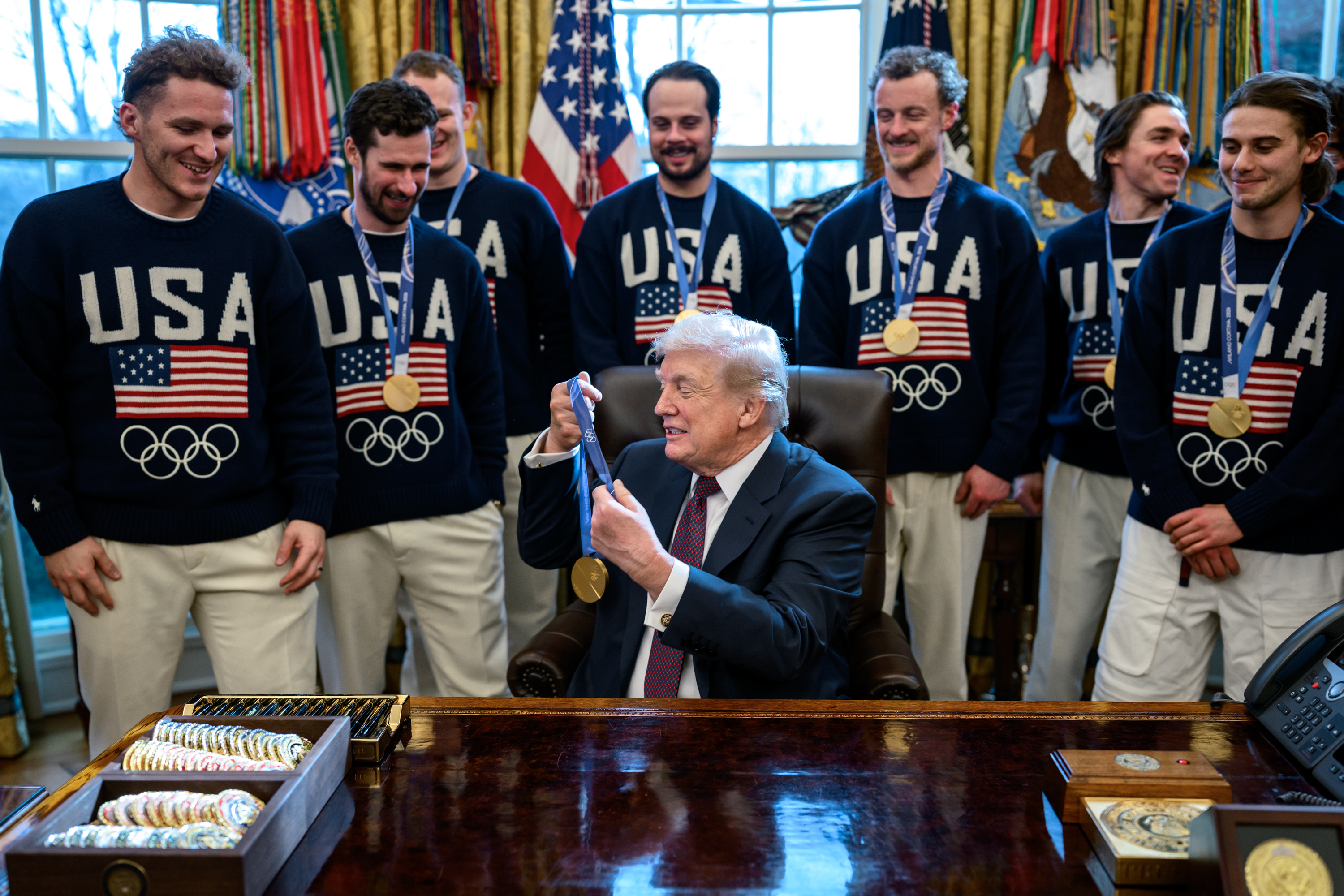
Hughes (far right) with teammates from the U.S. men's hockey team that won Olympic gold in 2026, during a visit to the White House, with President Trump

Hughes is a reported reader, and has brought books such as Atlas Shrugged by Ayn Rand and Kane and Abel by Jeffrey Archer on trips with his team, and reads during his down time. Hughes and his younger brother Luke announced the launch of their reading program Hughes Brothers Pucks & Pages, a multi-year reading program partnered with JAG Physical Therapy and Hockey in New Jersey, with the goal to promote literacy among New Jersey youth.

In an interview Hughes spoke in support for Pride Night and the LGBTQ+ community stating it was something the New Jersey Devils, Hughes and his family all supported.

While speaking with his brother Quinn, after backlash regarding the inclusion of FBI director Kash Patel and laughing to President Donald Trump's comments of being impeached if he did not invite the U.S. women's team to the White House, Hughes stated he felt that the backlash was both nonsense and "people making something out of nothing." He continued, stating that the women's team was aware that the men's team supports them and both teams celebrated their dual achievement together. In addition to a McDonald's-catered lunch with President Trump, Hughes attended the State of the Union and toured the White House with a majority of his team. Hughes was also photographed wearing a Trump USA hat with press secretary Karoline Leavitt, during the team's visit, causing additional online backlash. Following the Winter Olympics, and White House and State of the Union visits, Hughes and his brother Quinn were guests on Saturday Night Live and The Tonight Show, where they were joined by women's team members Hilary Knight and Megan Keller. During each show they discussed the Winter Olympics as well as the aftermath of both gold medal games and Trump's comments.

== Career statistics ==
=== Regular season and playoffs ===
			Regular season					Playoffs
Season	Team	League	GP	G	A	Pts	PIM	GP	G	A	Pts	PIM
2016–17	Toronto Marlboros	GTMMHL	33	23	50	73	4	—	—	—	—	—
2016–17	Georgetown Raiders	OJHL	—	—	—	—	—	9	1	2	3	2
2017–18	US NTDP Juniors	USHL	27	21	33	54	10	—	—	—	—	—
2017–18	US NTDP U17	USDP	24	13	35	48	10	—	—	—	—	—
2017–18	US NTDP U18	USDP	36	27	41	68	6	—	—	—	—	—
2018–19	US NTDP Juniors	USHL	24	12	36	48	4	—	—	—	—	—
2018–19	US NTDP U18	USDP	50	34	78	112	28	—	—	—	—	—
2019–20	New Jersey Devils	NHL	61	7	14	21	10	—	—	—	—	—
2020–21	New Jersey Devils	NHL	56	11	20	31	16	—	—	—	—	—
2021–22	New Jersey Devils	NHL	49	26	30	56	0	—	—	—	—	—
2022–23	New Jersey Devils	NHL	78	43	56	99	6	12	6	5	11	2
2023–24	New Jersey Devils	NHL	62	27	47	74	12	—	—	—	—	—
2024–25	New Jersey Devils	NHL	62	27	43	70	18	—	—	—	—	—
2025–26	New Jersey Devils	NHL	61	27	50	77	10	—	—	—	—	—
NHL totals			429	168	260	428	72	12	6	5	11	2

=== International ===
Year	Team	Event	Result	GP	G	A	Pts	PIM
2017	United States	U17	1st place, gold medalist(s)	6	5	10	15	2
2018	United States	WJC18	2nd place, silver medalist(s)	7	5	7	12	2
2019	United States	WJC	2nd place, silver medalist(s)	4	0	4	4	0
2019	United States	WJC18	3rd place, bronze medalist(s)	7	9	11	20	8
2019	United States	WC	7th	7	0	3	3	0
2025	United States	4NF	2nd	4	0	1	1	0
2026	United States	OG	1st place, gold medalist(s)	6	4	3	7	2
Junior totals				24	19	32	51	12
Senior totals				17	4	7	11	2

== Awards and honors ==
Award	Year	Ref
USHL
Dave Tyler Junior Player of the Year Award	2018	
NHL
NHL All-Star Game	2022, 2023, 2024	
EA Sports NHL cover athlete	2025	
International
World U-17 Hockey Challenge – All-Star Team	2017	
World U18 Championship – Tournament MVP	2018	
World U18 Championship – Best Forward	2018	
World U18 Championship – Media All-Star Team	2018, 2019	

== See also ==
- List of first overall NHL draft picks
- List of New Jersey Devils draft picks
- List of select Jewish ice hockey players

Awards and achievements
Preceded by Rasmus Dahlin	NHL first overall draft pick 2019	Succeeded by Alexis Lafrenière
Preceded by Ty Smith	New Jersey Devils first-round draft pick 2019	Succeeded by Alexander Holtz
