= New Hampshire Wildcats women's ice hockey =

- Current season
- University: University of New Hampshire
- Conference: Hockey East
- Head coach: Hilary Witt; 8th (1st at UNH) season, 96–126–24
- Arena: Whittemore Center Arena; Durham, New Hampshire
- Colors: Blue, gray, and white

AWCHA tournament champions
- 1998

NCAA tournament Frozen Four
- 2006, 2008

NCAA tournament appearances
- 2006, 2007, 2008, 2009, 2010

Conference tournament champions
- ECAC: 1986, 1987, 1990, 1991, 1996

Conference regular season champions
- 2006, 2007, 2008, 2009

The New Hampshire Wildcats represent the University of New Hampshire. They have won five ECAC championships between 1986 and 1996. When the Wildcats joined Hockey East, they won four Hockey East titles from 2006 to 2009. The Wildcats have more wins than any other women's ice hockey program at 668 in its first 32 years. The Wildcats went undefeated in their initial 74 games (73–0–1) spanning the 1978 through 1982 seasons. A UNH goaltender has been declared Hockey East Goaltending Champion in the first six years of the league's existence. From 2007 to 2009, UNH hosted NCAA Tournament Regional home games.

== Season-by-season results ==
Won championship	Lost championship	Conference champions	League leader

Year	Coach	W	L	T	Conference	Conf. W	Conf. L	Conf. T	Finish	Conference Tournament	NCAA Tournament
2025–26	Hilary Witt	16	16	3	Hockey East	10	12	2	5th HE	Lost Quarterfinals vs. Holy Cross (4–5)	Did not qualify
2024–25	Hilary Witt	15	17	3	Hockey East	11	14	2	7th HE	Lost First Round vs. Merrimack (1–3)	Did not qualify
2023–24	Hilary Witt	18	16	2	Hockey East	14	11	2	3rd HE	Won Quarterfinals vs. Vermont (3–0); Lost Semifinals vs. Northeastern (1–4)	Did not qualify
2022–23	Hilary Witt	12	21	3	Hockey East	9	15	3	8th HE	Won First Round vs. Holy Cross (6–3); Lost Quarterfinals vs. Vermont (1–2 OT)	Did not qualify
2021–22	Hilary Witt	11	21	2	Hockey East	9	16	1	8th HE	Lost First Round vs. Merrimack (1–4)	Did not qualify
2020–21	Hilary Witt	7	14	1	Hockey East	6	13	1	8th HE	Lost Quarterfinals vs. Northeastern (0–7)	Did not qualify
2019–20	Hilary Witt	18	15	4	Hockey East	12	12	3	6th HE	Won Quarterfinals vs. Providence (4–2, 1–0); Lost Semifinals vs. UConn (0–4)	Did not qualify
2018–19	Hilary Witt	13	17	6	Hockey East	10	14	3	6th HE	Lost Quarterfinals vs. Boston University (1–5, 1–3)	Did not qualify
2017–18	Hilary Witt	14	15	7	Hockey East	9	10	5	5th HE	Lost Quarterfinals vs. Northeastern (2–3, 1–2)	Did not qualify
2016–17	Hilary Witt	14	19	2	Hockey East	11	11	2	6th HE	Lost Quarterfinals vs. Boston University (4–2, 3–4, 2–3)	Did not qualify
2015–16	Hilary Witt	11	21	4	Hockey East	8	16	0	5th HE	Lost Quarterfinals vs. Connecticut (2–3, 3–4 3OT)	Did not qualify
2014–15	Hilary Witt	10	23	3	Hockey East	6	13	2	6th HE	Lost Quarterfinals vs. Northeastern (2–1, 2–3, 3–4)	Did not qualify
2013–14	Brian McCloskey	9	23	2	Hockey East	4	15	2	8th HE	Lost Quarterfinals vs. Boston College (1–8)	Did not qualify
2012–13	Brian McCloskey	14	16	4	Hockey East	10	8	3	4th HE	Lost Quarterfinals vs. Providence (4–5 OT)	Did not qualify
2011–12	Brian McCloskey	10	22	3	Hockey East	4	15	2	6th HE	Lost Quarterfinals vs. Boston University (1–9)	Did not qualify
2010–11	Brian McCloskey	14	16	2	Hockey East	7	13	1	7th HE	Did not qualify	Did not qualify
2009–10	Brian McCloskey	19	9	5	Hockey East	13	6	2	2nd HE	Lost Semifinals vs. Boston University (0–4)	Lost First Round vs. Minnesota-Duluth (1–2)
2008–09	Brian McCloskey	24	6	5	Hockey East	15	2	4	1st HE	Won Semifinals vs. Providence (3–1); Won Championship vs. Boston College (2–1)	Lost First Round vs. Minnesota-Duluth (1–4)
2007–08	Brian McCloskey	33	4	1	Hockey East	20	1	0	1st HE	Won Semifinals vs. Boston University (8–0); Won Championship vs. Providence (1–0)	Lost First Round vs. Minnesota-Duluth (2–3)
2006–07	Brian McCloskey	28	4	5	Hockey East	18	1	2	1st HE	Won Semifinals vs. Connecticut (2–0); Won Championship vs. Providence (3–1)	Lost First Round vs. St. Lawrence (2–6)
2005–06	Brian McCloskey	33	3	1	Hockey East	19	1	1	1st HE	Won Semifinals vs. Maine (6–0); Won Championship vs. Boston College (6–0)	Won First Round vs. Harvard (3–1); Lost Frozen Four vs. Minnesota (4–5)
2004–05	Brian McCloskey	21	8	6	Hockey East	13	3	4	1st HE	Lost Semifinals vs. Connecticut (4–5 OT)	Did not qualify
2003–04	Brian McCloskey	23	9	4	Hockey East	17	1	2	1st HE	Won Semifinals vs. Northeastern (5–0); Lost Championship vs. Providence (0–3)	Did not qualify
2002–03	Brian McCloskey	27	7	2	Hockey East	13	2	0	2nd HE	Won Semifinals vs. Maine (2–0); Lost Championship vs. Providence (0–1)	Did not qualify
2001–02	Karen Kay	19	12	5	ECAC Eastern	11	6	4	3rd ECAC E.	Won Quarterfinals vs. Connecticut (4–1); Lost Semifinals vs. Northeastern (0–2)	Did not qualify
2000–01	Karen Kay	17	17	0	ECAC	13	11	0	6th ECAC	Lost Quarterfinals vs. St. Lawrence (0–1)	Did not qualify
1999-00	Karen Kay	24	10	0	ECAC	17	7	0	4th ECAC	Lost Quarterfinals vs. Northeastern (3–4)	Did not qualify
1998–99	Karen Kay	23	7	5	ECAC	19	4	3	2nd ECAC	Won Quarterfinals vs. Princeton (7–1); Won Semifinals vs. Brown (5–1); Lost Championship vs. Harvard (4–5 OT)	Did not qualify
1997–98	Karen Kay	31	5	3	ECAC					Lost Championship vs. Brown	
1996–97	Karen Kay	23	9	3	ECAC					Lost Championship vs. Northeastern	
1995–96	Karen Kay	24	5	2	ECAC					Won Championship vs. Providence	
1994–95	Karen Kay	23	10	2	ECAC					Lost Championship vs. Providence	
1993–94	Karen Kay	14	10	3	ECAC						
1992–93	Karen Kay	17	5	2	ECAC					Lost Championship vs. Providence	
1991–92	Russ McCurdy	15	6	2	ECAC					Lost Championship vs. Providence	
1990–91	Russ McCurdy	19	3	0	ECAC					Won Championship vs. Northeastern (6-1)	
1989–90	Russ McCurdy	20	3	1	ECAC					Won Championship vs. Providence (5-2)	
1988–89	Russ McCurdy	16	6	0	ECAC						
1987–88	Russ McCurdy	15	5	1	ECAC						
1986–87	Russ McCurdy	18	1	3	ECAC					Won Championship vs. Northeastern (3-2)	
1985–86	Russ McCurdy	18	3	1	ECAC					Won Championship vs. Northeastern (6-3)	
1984–85	Russ McCurdy	18	3	0	ECAC					Lost Championship vs. Providence	
1983–84	Russ McCurdy	16	4	0	ECAC					Lost Championship vs. Providence	
1982–83	Russ McCurdy	19	1	0	EAIAW					Won Championship vs. Providence (5-3)	
1981–82	Russ McCurdy	18	1	1	EAIAW					Won Championship vs. Providence	
1980–81	Russ McCurdy	21	0	0	EAIAW					Won Championship vs. Providence	
1979–80	Russ McCurdy	20	0	0	EAIAW					Won Championship vs. Providence (5-2)	
1978–79	Russ McCurdy	16	0	1							
1977–78	Russ McCurdy	15	0	0							

== Team history ==
=== Pre-Varsity Club Seasons ===
Women's hockey started as a club team at UNH in 1975. Of the original nine ECAC Division I teams, UNH and Dartmouth were the fifth and sixth universities to form club teams, preceded only by Brown University (then Pembroke College; 1963), Cornell University (1970), Providence College (1973), and Princeton University (1974).

=== Varsity Team ===
==== Inaugural Varsity Season (1977-1978) ====
The women's team was first granted varsity status in 1977. Russ McCurdy left his position as a men's assistant coach at Yale to serve as the team's first head coach. McCurdy had helped get Yale a varsity women's ice hockey team, although he left to coach at UNH before their shared inaugural season (1977-1978).

UNH's inaugural team went undefeated in the 1977–78 season, finishing with a 15–0-0 record. The final game of the season was at Colby College with a 4-1 win.

==== Undefeated Years (1977 - 1982) ====
The team continued to win under McCurdy, remaining undefeated for its first four seasons with a 72–0–1 record. In the 1978-1979 season, the team went 16-0-1, ending with an 8-2 win at UConn. In the 1979-1980 season, the team finished with a perfect 20-0-0, and won the inaugural Eastern Association of Intercollegiate Athletics for Women (EAIAW) tournament championship 5-2 against Providence College. The team had a second consecutive perfect season in 1980-1981 with 21-0-0, again winning the EAIAW Championship against Providence.

Altogether, the team remained undefeated for its first four seasons. It had an unbeaten streak of 74 games (73-0-1) and a 57-game winning streak. The team lost their first game on December 8, 1981 during the 1981-1982 season.

==== Eastern Association of Intercollegiate Athletics for Women (EAIAW) ====
The Eastern Association of Intercollegiate Athletics for Women (EAIAW) was the first sponsor of women's intercollegiate ice hockey. The conference began in the 1979-1980 season, and they held their inaugural tournament in 1979. Tournaments continued under their name until 1983. On February 2, 1983, UNH recorded its 100th victory in a 7-1 win against Dartmouth College.

The Wildcats won all four EAIAW championships.

==== Eastern Collegiate Athletic Conference (ECAC) ====
The Eastern Collegiate Athletic Conference (ECAC) became the governing body for women's ice hockey in 1984. The Wildcats made it to the championships for the first two years, ultimately losing to Providence. They later won the championship tournaments four times under Coach McCurdy (1986, 1987, 1990, 1991) and once under Coach Karen Kay (1996).

On January 15, 1989, the team recorded its 200th victory in a 5-2 victory against St. Lawrence.

==== Late 90s and Early 2000s ====
The Wildcats competed in the first AWCHA Division I National Ice Hockey Championship. Contested in March 1998, the Wildcats defeated the Brown Bears by a 4–1 score, to become the first recognized national champion in women's college ice hockey. On January 15, 2000, Carisa Zaban recorded her second straight hat trick (including her 100th career goal), while Samantha Holmes scored one goal and five assists. The Wildcats defeated Northeastern by a score of 9–1.

==== 2006 to 2008 ====
From 2005–06 to 2007–08, the Wildcats set school records with 33 wins in 2006 and 2008. The 2006 team broke seven team and three individual UNH records as well as four team and one individual NCAA records, and 14 team and five individual Hockey East records. In addition, the club had its first perfect season at the Whittemore Center in 2006 (17–0–0). In 2006–07, the club was ranked No. 1 in the nation during the 2007 season (ended at No. 4). The club's 28 wins in 2007 ranks fourth on program's single-season list.

The following year, in 2007–08, New Hampshire was ranked No. 1 in the nation for eight weeks. The Wildcats ended the year #1 in the nation in penalty kill, #2 in offense, #2 in defense and #2 in power play. The 2008 Wildcats broke six Hockey East team records and tied two others en route to the league's first undefeated season. During the 2007–08 season, Sam Faber of New Hampshire set an NCAA record (since tied) for most game winning goals in one season with 13.

== Current Roster ==
=== 2022–23 Wildcats ===
As of September 9, 2022.

No.	Nat.	Player	Class	Pos	Height	DoB	Hometown	Previous team
1		Nicky Harnett	Senior	G	5' 7" (1.7 m)	2001-12-01	Plymouth, Minnesota	Robbinsdale Armstrong High School
2		Autumn Mish	Freshman	D	5' 11" (1.8 m)	2002-11-25	Long Lake, New York	Canterbury School
3		Annie Berry (C)	Senior	F	5' 2" (1.57 m)	2000-03-13	Milton, Massachusetts	Tabor Academy
5		Rae Breton	Senior	D	5' 8" (1.73 m)	2001-03-06	Brighton, Ontario	Durham West Jr. Lightning
6		Alyson Hush	Freshman	F	5' 5" (1.65 m)	2004-01-01	Toronto, Ontario	Durham West Jr. Lightning
8		Nicole Kelly	Junior	F	5' 5" (1.65 m)	2001-02-27	Brantford, Ontario	Etobicoke Jr. Dolphins
9		Kelly Harty	Freshman	F	5' 4" (1.63 m)	2003-10-01	Billerica, Massachusetts	The Governor's Academy
10		Lauren Martin (C)	Graduate	F	5' 7" (1.7 m)	2000-02-24	Cambridge, Ontario	Cambridge Rivulettes
11		Chavonne Truter	Junior	F	5' 11" (1.8 m)	2002-02-27	Uxbridge, Ontario	Durham West Jr. Lightning
13		Gabby Jones	Graduate	F	5' 4" (1.63 m)	1999-09-30	Westfield, Massachusetts	Merrimack College
14		Kira Juodikis	Sophomore	F	5' 11" (1.8 m)	2003-05-24	LaSalle, Ontario	Southwest Wildcats
15		Shea Verrier	Sophomore	F	5' 7" (1.7 m)	2002-06-25	Reading, Massachusetts	Cushing Academy
16		Jada Christian	Senior	F	5' 5" (1.65 m)	2001-02-03	Caledon East, Ontario	Oakville Jr. Hornets
17		Brianna Brooks	Junior	F	5' 9" (1.75 m)	2002-06-28	Whitby, Ontario	Durham West Jr. Lightning
18		Tamara Thiérus	Senior	F	5' 3" (1.6 m)	2000-10-17	Saint-Jérôme, Quebec	Stanstead College
19		Hannah Rodgers	Freshman	F	5' 5" (1.65 m)	2003-02-21	Wilmington, North Carolina	Shattuck-Saint Mary's
20		Kyla Bent	Junior	D	5' 4" (1.63 m)	2002-03-06	Halifax, Nova Scotia	Rothesay Netherwood School
21		Marina Alvarez	Sophomore	D	5' 5" (1.65 m)	2003-01-21	Center Moriches, New York	Northwood School
23		Charli Kettyle (C)	Junior	D	5' 7" (1.7 m)	2002-02-22	Perth, Ontario	Nepean Jr. Wildcats
24		Brooke Hammer	Sophomore	F	5' 4" (1.63 m)	2003-01-01	Commerce Township, Michigan	Belle Tire
25		Emily Rickwood	Graduate	D	5' 7" (1.7 m)	2000-02-21	Brantford, Ontario	Oakville Jr. Hornets
26		Emily Pinto	Graduate	F	5' 3" (1.6 m)	1999-10-12	Mulmur, Ontario	Mercyhurst University
27		Brianna Legros	Junior	D	5' 5" (1.65 m)	2002-04-11	New Liskeard, Ontario	Etobicoke Jr. Dolphins
33		Ava Hills	Freshman	G	5' 9" (1.75 m)	2003-09-04	Pembroke, New Hampshire	North American Hockey Academy
35		Ava Boutilier (C)	Graduate	G	5' 5" (1.65 m)	1999-11-16	Charlottetown, Prince Edward Island	Charlottetown Abbies

== Coaches ==
=== Head Coaches ===
==== Russ McCurdy ====
Russ McCurdy was the varsity team's first head coach. He coached the team for 15 seasons from 1977 to 1992, guiding the Wildcats to four EIAIW titles, eight ECAC championship games, and four ECAC championship titles. He left the program with an overall record of 264-36-10. As of the 2024–2025 season, he holds the highest winning percentage of any women's college ice hockey coach.

Russ passed away in 2024 at the age 84.

===== 1992 IIHF Women's World Championship =====
In April 1992, shortly after his final season at UNH, McCurdy served as Head Coach for the US women's hockey team at the IIHF Women's World Championship in Tampere, Finland. Six of the team's thirty players were from UNH including Ellen Weinberg, Karyn Bye, Sue Merz, Colleen Coyne, and Erin Whitten. The team brought home silver.

===== Russell J. McCurdy Gallery =====
In 2006, the University of New Hampshire athletic department dedicated a wall in the Whittemore Center to Russ McCurdy. The wall is officially called the Russell J. McCurdy Gallery and displays the women's teams photos and headshots.

==== Karen Kay ====
Karen Kay, former hockey player at Providence College, took over as head coach in the 1992-1993 season. She coached the team for 10 seasons between 1992 and 2001. Her record as head coach was 215-90-25. In 2012, she was inducted into the Massachusetts Hockey Hall of Fame.

===== 1993 IIHF Women's World Championship =====
Kay served as the US women's hockey team's head coach during the 1994 IIHF Women's World Championship in Lake Placid, New York, USA. The team include four former UNH players - Colleen Coyne, Erin Whitten, Karyn Bye, and Sue Merz. The team won silver.

==== Brian McCloskey ====
Brian McCloskey, former assistant coach for the UNH men's hockey team, took over as head coach in the 2002-2003 season. He led the team to six Hockey East champion tournaments, four of which they won (2006, 2007, 2008, 2009). McCloskey was fired midway through the 2013-2014 season after physically assaulting a player during a home game.

After leaving UNH, he served as the Head Coach for the Worcester Blades in the Canadian Women's Hockey League (CWHL) during the 2015-2016 and 2016-2017 seasons.

==== Hilary Witt ====
Hilary Witt, a former Northeastern player, took over for McCloskey as Head Coach in April 2014. Witt had previously coached at Yale (two years as assistant coach, eight years as head coach) and was an assistant coach on the 2014 U.S. Olympic women's ice hockey team. As a player, she was on the silver-winning US women's hockey team at the 2001 IIHF Women's World Championship.

=== Assistant and Associate Coaches ===
==== Ellen Weinberg ====
Ellen Weinberg, former defense at UNH, served as an assistant coach while completing a graduate degree at UNH. She played on the US women's hockey team for the 1992 Women's World Championship and was named to the all star team. In 2026, she made headlines for serving as a player development consultant for the gold-winning US Women's Ice Hockey national team at the 2026 Winter Olympics. She made headlines for helping the US women win gold while two of her sons were on the US Men's Ice Hockey national team who also won gold.

==== Erin Whitten ====
Erin Whitten, former UNH goaltender, joined the UNH women's ice hockey staff on July 17, 2000. On July 27, 2006, she was promoted to the position of associate head coach. Prior to coaching, Hamlen was the starting goaltender for the US women's hockey team from 1992 to 1997. She also played on the team in 1999 and 2001. Later, Whitten was the first head coach for the Worcester Blades in the Canadian Women's Hockey League (CWHL).

== First Outdoor Game ==
- The Northeastern University women's hockey team faced off against New Hampshire at Fenway Park on Jan. 8, 2010, in the first outdoor women's college hockey game ever played. The Wildcats came from behind to win the game by a score of 5–3, with a four goal rally in the third period. The 4 p.m. game played between the Huskies and Wildcats was the first game of a Hockey East Doubleheader. The men's teams at Boston College and Boston University played at 7:30 p.m. It was the 110th all-time matchup between the Huskies and the Wildcats. In the prior 109 matches, New Hampshire had a 73–28–7 record vs. the Huskies.

== Notable players ==
- Jonna Albers
- Kacey Bellamy
- Courtney Bichard
- Ava Boutilier
- Winnie Brodt-Brown
- Brianna Brooks
- Karyn Bye
- Kathy Bryant (Finished the 1979 season with 43 assists, the program's single-season record)
- Colleen Coyne
- Tricia Dunn
- Samantha "Sam" Faber
- Brandy Fisher
- Gail Griffith (Scored the fastest goal in UNH history after giving the Wildcats a 1-0 lead seven seconds into the game in 1979)
- Samantha Holmes
- Andria Hunter
- Nicoline Jensen
- Micaela Long
- Cindy MacKay (Holds the school record by a defenseman at 108 points)
- Julia Marty
- Stefanie Marty
- Meghara McManus
- Sue Merz
- Kelly Paton
- Marie-Jo Pelletier
- Katey Stone
- Carlee Turner
- Vilma Vaattovaara
- Jenn Wakefield
- Ellen Weinberg-Hughes
- Taylor Wenczkowski
- Erin Whitten (Four-year varsity goaltender at New Hampshire from 1989–93)
- Carisa Zaban (former head coach for Brown women's ice hockey)

== Championships and accolades ==
- UNH's history includes four consecutive EAIAW (Eastern Association for Intercollegiate Athletics for Women) titles from 1980–83 and five ECAC titles (1986-87-90-91-96).
- In 1998, New Hampshire won the inaugural women's ice hockey championship (sponsored by the American Women's College Hockey Alliance) in 1998 at the FleetCenter in Boston. In that 1998 season, Brandy Fisher won the inaugural Patty Kazmaier Memorial Award as the top women's collegiate player. Four Wildcats were also members of the 1998 gold-medal winning U.S. Olympic team.
- ECAC titles (1990, 1991)
- ECAC runner-up (1992, 1993)
- Appeared in the Frozen Four in 2006 and 2008
- Hockey East regular-season champions in ‘04 ‘05 ‘06 ‘07 ‘08
- Hockey East Tournament champions in ‘06 ‘07 ‘08

== Awards and honors ==
=== National Awards and Honors ===
- Courtney Birchard, 2010 Women's RBK Hockey Division I All-America Second Team
- Erin Whitten, USA Hockey Women's Player of the Year (1994
- Ava Boutilier, New Hampshire, Women's Hockey Commissioners Association Goaltender of the Month February 2020

=== Patty Kazmaier Award ===
- Brandy Fisher was the inaugural Patty Kazmaier Award winner in 1998.
- Finalists: Nicki Luongo in 1999, Carisa Zaban in 2000 and Kelly Paton in 2010
- Martine Garland, Top 10 Finalist for 2007 Patty Kazmaier Award
- Kira Misikowetz, Top 10 Finalist for 2002 Patty Kazmaier Award

=== Conference Awards ===
==== All Rookie Team ====
- Kira Juodikis, 2022
- Nicole Kelly, 2021
- Kristina Lavoie, 2010 WHEA

==== All Star Team ====
- Courtney Birchard, 2010 WHEA First-Team All-Star
- Kira Juodikis, 2023, 2024, 2025 Third-Team All-Star
- Micaela Long, 2010 WHEA First-Team All-Star
- Kelly Paton, 2010 WHEA First-Team All-Star
- Kristina Lavoie, 2010 WHEA Honorable Mention All-Star
- Ellen Weinberg-Hughes, ECAC Division I (1991)
- Erin Whitten, ECAC First Team (1992 and 1993)
- Erin Whitten, ECAC All-Star Selection (equivalent to First Team status) in 1990 and 1991

==== Player of the Year ====
- Kelly Paton, 2010 Hockey East Co-Player of the Year
- Carolyn Gordon, 2003–04 Hockey East Player of the Year

==== Rookie of the Year ====
- Kristina Lavoie, 2010 Hockey East Rookie of the Year

==== Goaltender of the Year ====
- Erin Whitten, ECAC Goaltender of the Year (1992)

==== Other Awards ====
- Winny Brodt, 1998 AWCHA Tournament Most Outstanding player
- Lindsey Dumond, New Hampshire, 2021 Hockey East Best Defensive Forward Award
- Tricia Dunn, Forward, New Hampshire; 1996 ECAC All-Tournament Team
- Brandy Fisher, F, 1996 ECAC Tournament most valuable player
- Samantha Holmes, 1999–2000 New England Hockey Writers Association Women's Division I All-Star Team
- Jen Huggon, All-America honors in 2003
- Carrie Jokiel, 2000 Sarah Devens Award
- Micaela Long, 2010 Hockey East Scoring Champion
- Nicki Luongo, 1999 American Women's College Hockey Alliance All-Americans, First Team
- Kerry Maher, 1999–2000 New England Hockey Writers Association Women's Division I All-Star Team
- Kira Misikowetz, Forward, 2001–02 New England Hockey Writers Women's Division I All-Star Team
- Kelly Paton, Runner Up, 2010 Hockey East Scoring Champion
- Kelly Paton, 2010 Frozen Four Skills Competition participant
- Kelly Paton, 2010 Women's RBK Hockey Division I All-America First Team
- Heather Reinke, Defense, 1996 All-ECAC Team
- Heather Reinke, Defense, 1996 ECAC All-Tournament Team
- Dina Solimini, Goaltender, 1996 ECAC All-Tournament Team
- Dina Solimini, 1996 ECAC Honor Roll
- Erin Whitten, UNH Department of Women's Athletics Athlete of the Year (1993)
- Carisa Zaban, 1996 ECAC Honor Roll
- Carisa Zaban, 1999 American Women's College Hockey Alliance All-Americans, Second Team
- Carisa Zaban, 1999–2000 New England Hockey Writers Association Women's Division I All-Star Team
- Carisa Zaban, 1999–2000 All-America selection

== Team Scoring Champions ==
Season	Player	GP	G	A	Pts
2002–03	Stephanie Jones	36	22	15	37
2003–04					
2004–05					
2005–06					
2006–07					
2007–08	Sam Faber	38	25	24	49
2008–09	Jenn Wakefield	31	32	17	49
2009–10	Kelly Paton	22	12	24	36
2010–11	Kristina Lavoie	32	9	11	20
2011–12	Kristina Lavoie	32	16	12	28
2012–13	Kristina Lavoie	32	11	12	23
2013–14	Jessica Hitchcock	26	9	12	21
2014–15	Jonna Curtis	36	13	9	22
2015–16	Jonna Curtis	36	16	17	33
2016–17	Jonna Curtis	35	21	21	42
2017–18	Meghara McManus	34	11	9	20
2018–19	Taylor Wenczkowski	36	20	6	26
2019–20	Meghara McManus	36	17	10	27
2020–21	Nicole Kelly	22	5	9	14
2021–22	Kira Juodikis	29	12	8	20
2022–23	Emily Pinto	36	9	20	29
2023–24	Kira Juodikis	36	15	10	25
2024–25	Kira Juodikis	33	12	8	20

== Wildcats in professional hockey ==
= CWHL All-Star	= NWHL All-Star	= Clarkson Cup Champion	= Isobel Cup Champion

Player	Position	Team(s)	League(s)	Years	Clarkson Cup	Isobel Cup
Kacey Bellamy	Defense	Boston Blades; Boston Pride; Calgary Inferno	CWHL; NWHL founded 2015; CWHL		3 (2013, 2015 and 2019)	1 (2016)
Courtney Birchard	Defense	Brampton Thunder	CWHL			
Winny Brodt	Defense	Minnesota Whitecaps	WWHL; NWHL joined NWHL in 2018		1 (2010)	1 (2019)
Raylen Dziengelewski	Defense	Boston Blades	CWHL	1		
Sam Faber	Defense	Boston Blades; Connecticut Whale	CWHL; NWHL			
Samantha Holmes	Forward	Calgary Oval X-Treme; Strathmore Rockies team founder	WWHL			
Andria Hunter	Forward	Mississauga	WWHL			
Kira Juodikis	Forward	New York Sirens	PWHL	1		
Micaela Long		Boston Blades; Connecticut Whale	CWHL; NWHL	4		
Meghara McManus	Forward	Boston Pride	NWHL			1 (2021)
Julia Marty	Forward	SC Reinach Damen; Linköping HC; HC Université Neuchâtel Dames	SWHL A Riksserien (W); SWHL A (W)			
Stefanie Marty	Forward	SC Reinach Damen; Linköping HC; HC Université Neuchâtel Dames	SWHL A Riksserien (W); SWHL A (W)			
Kelly Paton	Forward	Boston Blades	CWHL	1 (2015–16)		
Jenna Rheault	Defense	Boston Pride	NWHL			1 (2021)
Shannon Sisk	Forward	Boston Blades	CWHL	2		
Carlee Turner	Forward	Boston Pride	NWHL			1 (2021)
Jennifer Wakefield	Forward	Toronto Furies; Linköping HC; Luleå HF; Brynäs IF; Djurgårdens IF	CWHL; SDHL			
Taylor Wenczkowski	Forward	Boston Pride	NWHL			1 (2021)
Erin Whitten	Goaltender	Adirondack Red Wings; Dallas Freeze	AHL; Central Hockey League			

== See also ==
- New Hampshire Wildcats men's ice hockey
- New Hampshire Wildcats
- List of college women's ice hockey coaches with 250 wins (Russ McCurdy ranks tenth in wins, first in winning percentage on all-time list)
