= Sam Faber =

American ice hockey player

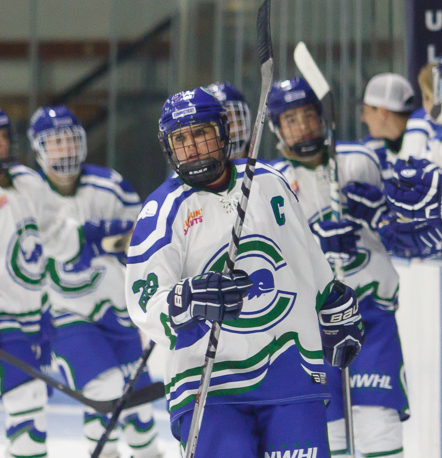
- Sam Faber playing for the Connecticut Whale in 2017
- Born: May 8, 1987 (age 39) Mount Sinai, New York, U.S.
- Height: 5 ft 4 in (163 cm)
- Weight: 130 lb (59 kg; 9 st 4 lb)
- Position: Forward
- Shoots: Right
- PHF team Former teams: Connecticut Whale: Boston Blades (CWHL); New Hampshire Wildcats (NCAA)
- National team: United States
- Playing career: 2005–present
Medal record
Women's ice hockey
Representing United States
IIHF World Women's Championships
Gold medal – first place	2008 China	Tournament

Samantha Faber (born May 8, 1987) is an American ice hockey player. Faber competed for the New Hampshire Wildcats women's ice hockey program in Hockey East. During the 2007–08 season, Faber set an NCAA record (since tied) for most game-winning goals in one season with 13. She is a former member of the United States women's national ice hockey team. She was part of the gold medal winning roster at the 2008 IIHF World Women's Championships.

== Early life ==
Faber was born in Mount Sinai, New York, Her father, Scott Faber, was a hockey letterwinner at Rochester Institute of Technology, and her brother Matt was a hockey letterwinner at Johnson & Wales University. She attended Northwood School, where she lettered in hockey (recording 75 points with 50 goals and 25 assists in her senior year), soccer, and lacrosse, graduating in 2005.

== Ice hockey career ==
Faber majored in women's studies at New Hampshire University. She competed for the New Hampshire Wildcats women's ice hockey program in Hockey East from 2005–09, playing 133 games and scoring 189 total points, and was named a Hockey East First Team All Star each of her last three seasons. In 2005-06, she was No. 3 in the nation in rookie scoring. In 2006, she was Hockey East Rookie of the Year. During the 2007–08 season, Faber set an NCAA record (since tied) for most game-winning goals in one season with 13. She is the 5th all-time scorer in NHU history, with 189 points in 143 games.

Faber was a member of the US Under-22 National Team in 2007 and 2008. She is also a former member of the United States women's national ice hockey team, and was part of the gold medal winning team at the 2008 IIHF World Women's Championships.

From 2010-11, Faber played for the Boston Blades of the Canadian Women's Hockey League (CWHL).

From 2015-18, she played for the Connecticut Whale of the Premier Hockey Federation (PHF) as their forward and captain. In 2018, she was selected to the All Star team.

On June 21, 2021, Faber was named assistant coach of the University of New Hampshire women's ice hockey team for the 2021-22 season.

Faber is also the Youth Hockey Director at SoNo Ice House South Norwalk, Connecticut, for Nanook Hockey.

== Career stats ==
=== NCAA ===
Year	GP	G	AST	PTS	PPG	SHG	GWG
2005–06	38	25	24	49	5	2	4
2006–07	33	17	29	46	4	0	3
2007–08	37	22	29	51	3	3	13
2008–09	35	13	30	43	3	3	3
Career	143	77	112	189	15	8	23

=== USA Hockey ===
Year	Event	GP	G	AST	PTS	PIM
2007	Under 22 vs. Canada	3	0	0	0	4

== Awards and honors ==
- 2009 Hockey East First-Team All-Star
- 2008 New Hampshire Wildcats Karyn Bye Award
- 2008 Patty Kazmaier Memorial Award Top 10 Finalist
- 2008 Hockey East Tournament MVP
- 2008 Hockey East All-Tournament Team
- 2008 New England Hockey Writer's Association All-Star Team
- 2007 Hockey East First-Team All-Star
- 2007 Hockey East All-Tournament Team
- 2007 Hockey East Three Stars Award
- 2007 New England Hockey Writer's Association All-Star Team
- 2006 Hockey East Tournament MVP
- 2006 Hockey East All-Tournament Team
- 2006 Hockey East Rookie of the Year
- 2006 Hockey East All-Rookie Team honoree
- February 2006 Hockey East Rookie of the Month
- 2006 All-USCHO Rookie Team

== See also ==
- List of select Jewish ice hockey players
