= Kira Juodikis =

Canadian ice hockey player (born 2003)

- Born: May 24, 2003 (age 22) LaSalle, Ontario, Canada
- Height: 5 ft 11 in (180 cm)
- Position: Forward
- Shoots: Right
- PWHL team: New York Sirens
- Playing career: 2020–present

Kira Juodikis (born May 24, 2003) is a Canadian professional ice hockey forward for the New York Sirens of the Professional Women's Hockey League (PWHL). She played college ice hockey at New Hampshire.

== Early life ==
Juodikis attended Sandwich Secondary School and competed in hockey, basketball, volleyball, soccer, badminton and track & field. She won the Windsor Essex Sports Person of the Year Female Hockey Award, and was one of three finalists for the Female Athlete of the Year. In 2018, she committed to play college ice hockey at New Hampshire.

== Playing career ==
=== College ===
Juodikis began her collegiate career for New Hampshire during the 2021–22 season, where she recorded 12 goals and eight assists in 29 games. She led the team in goals and points, and ranked fourth in assists and shots. Following the season she was a unanimous selection to the Hockey East All-Rookie team. During the 2022–23 NCAA season, in her sophomore year, she recorded 17 goals and 11 assists in 36 games. Following the season she was named to the Hockey East All-Third team.

On May 12, 2023, she was named captain for the 2023–24 season. During her junior year, she recorded 15 goals and 10 assists in 36 games and was named to the Hockey East All-Third team for the second consecutive season. She led the team in goals (15), power-play goals (five), points (25) and shots (90). On August 7, 2024, she was named captain for the 2024–25 season. During her senior year, she recorded 12 goals and eight assists in 33 games. She led the team in goals, points and shots. On January 3, 2025, she scored her 50th career goal, becoming the 30th player in program history to reach the milestone. Following the season she was named to the Hockey East All-Third Team for the third consecutive season.

She finished her collegiate career with 56 goals and 37 assists in 134 games.

=== Professional ===
Following her collegiate career, Juodikis signed with the ZSC Lions Frauen of the SWHL A on July 17, 2025. During the 2025–26 season, she recorded 13 goals and seven assists in 24 games.

On March 31, 2026, she signed a reserve player contract with the New York Sirens. On April 15, 2026, she signed a standard player agreement with the Sirens after Savannah Norcross was placed on the long-term injured reserve list (LTIR). She made her PWHL debut later that day against the Toronto Sceptres and recorded one hit in 5:37.

== Career statistics ==
=== Regular season and playoffs ===
			Regular season					Playoffs
Season	Team	League	GP	G	A	Pts	PIM	GP	G	A	Pts	PIM
2021–22	University of New Hampshire	HE	29	12	8	20	0	—	—	—	—	—
2022–23	University of New Hampshire	HE	36	17	11	28	4	—	—	—	—	—
2023–24	University of New Hampshire	HE	36	15	10	25	12	—	—	—	—	—
2024–25	University of New Hampshire	HE	33	12	8	20	6	—	—	—	—	—
2025–26	New York Sirens	PWHL	4	0	0	0	0	—	—	—	—	—
PWHL totals			4	0	0	0	0	—	—	—	—	—

== Awards and honours ==
Honours	Year	Ref
College
All-Hockey East Rookie team	2022	
All-Hockey East Third team	2023	
All-Hockey East Third team	2024	
All-Hockey East Third team	2025	
CSC Academic All District Women’s at Large Team	2024/25	
Hockey East Women's All Academic Team	2021-25	
Krampade All American Scholar	2021-25	
Chi Alpha Sigma National Collegiate Honour Society	2024/25	
Team Ontario Red U-18 National Champions	2019	
