= Brandy Fisher =

American former ice hockey forward

- Born: October 28, 1975 (age 50) Potsdam, NY, USA
- Height: 5 ft 5 in (165 cm)
- Weight: 150 lb (68 kg; 10 st 10 lb)
- Position: Forward
- Shot: Right
- Played for: New Hampshire Wildcats
- National team: United States
- Playing career: 1994–2000
Medal record
World Championship
Silver medal – second place	1999 Finland	Tournament
Silver medal – second place	2000 Canada	Tournament

Brandy Fisher (born October 28, 1975) is an American former ice hockey forward. She played for the New Hampshire Wildcats women's ice hockey program and was the first ever winner of the Patty Kazmaier Award, awarded to the top female ice hockey player in the NCAA. Brandy was born in Potsdam, New York.

== Playing career ==
One of the highlights of her NCAA career came in the 1996 ECAC Tournament. She scored the game-winning goal to end the longest game in NCAA men's and women's ice hockey history at that time. Her goal against Providence College at 5:35 of the fifth overtime gave New Hampshire the ECAC championship.

In addition, she played for the United States national women's ice hockey team that participated in the 1999 and 2000 IIHF Women's World Ice Hockey championships.

== Awards and honors ==
- Bauer/ECAC Player of the week for March 11, 1996
- ECAC Tournament Most Valuable Player (1996)
- Patty Kazmaier Award (1998)

Awards and achievements
Preceded by Award created	Patty Kazmaier Award; 1997–98	Succeeded by A. J. Mleczko
