= Meghara McManus =

American ice hockey player (born 1998)

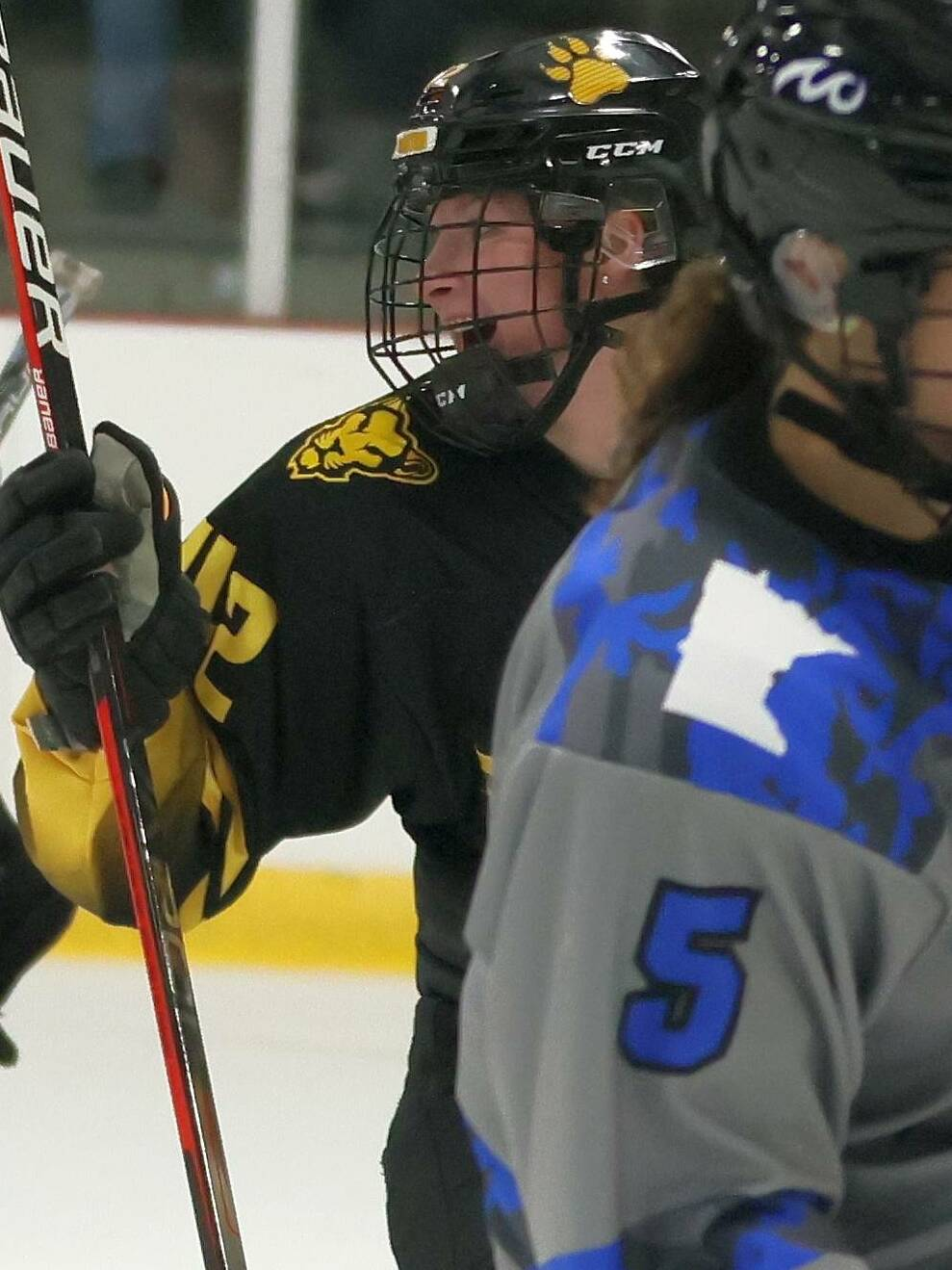
- McManus with the Boston Pride in 2022
- Born: April 12, 1998 (age 27) Milton, Massachusetts, U.S.
- Height: 5 ft 5 in (165 cm)
- Position: Forward
- Shoots: Right
- PHF team Former teams: Boston Pride: UNH Wildcats women's ice hockey
- National team: United States
- Playing career: 2016–present

Meghara McManus (born April 12, 1998) is an American former ice hockey player who played for the Boston Pride in the now defunct Premier Hockey Federation.

== Career ==
In 140 NCAA games at the University of New Hampshire, McManus scored 84 points. As a senior she was awarded the team MVP of the UNH Wildcats while leading the team in goals (17) and points (27).

McManus was drafted in the 5th round of the 2020 NWHL Draft and signed a one-year deal with the Boston Pride on June 23, 2020. In her first two seasons with the Pride, the team won back-to-back Isobel Cup championships.

== Personal life ==
McManus majored in psychology at the University of New Hampshire.

== Career stats ==
			Regular Season					Playoffs
Season	Team	League	GP	G	A	Pts	PIM	GP	G	A	Pts	PIM
2016–17	New Hampshire Wildcats women's ice hockey	NCAA	35	8	9	17	22	-	-	-	-	-
2017-18	New Hampshire Wildcats women's ice hockey	NCAA	34	11	9	20	28	-	-	-	-	-
2018-19	New Hampshire Wildcats women's ice hockey	NCAA	36	12	8	20	24	-	-	-	-	-
2019–20	New Hampshire Wildcats women's ice hockey	NCAA	36	17	10	27	16	-	-	-	-	-
2020-21	Boston Pride	NWHL
NWHL totals

== Honours ==
- 2019-20 Karyn L. Bye Award (MVP) for the UNH Wildcats team
- 2019-20 Blue Line Club Award (awarded for exhibiting a positive culture in the locker room, on the ice, in youth clinics and in the community)
- 2017-18 Led the UNH Wildcats in goals (11) and points (20) (tied in both categories)
