= Taylor Wenczkowski =

American ice hockey player (born 1997)

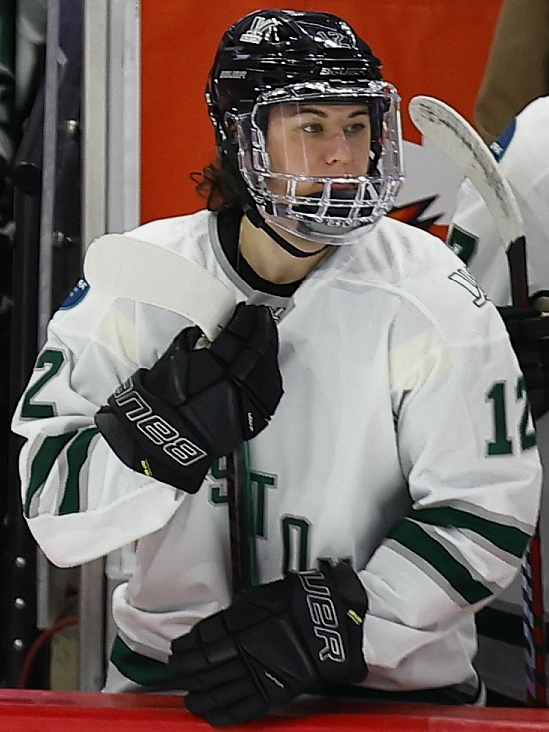
- Wenczkowski with PWHL Boston in 2024
- Born: September 25, 1997 (age 29) Rochester, New Hampshire, U.S.
- Height: 5 ft 7 in (170 cm)
- Position: Forward
- Shot: Right
- Played for: PWHL Boston; Boston Pride; New Hampshire Wildcats
- National team: United States
- Playing career: 2012–2024

Taylor Wenczkowski (born September 25, 1997) is an American ice hockey coach and former professional ice hockey player. She is currently an assistant coach for the Boston College Eagles.

== Playing career ==
As a junior player, Wenczkowski played 72 games over three seasons for the Boston Shamrocks of the Junior Women's Hockey League. She scored 35 points in each of her last two seasons.

Wenczkowski was a two time member of the USA U18 Select Team in 2013 & 2014.

In 148 NCAA games over five years at the University of New Hampshire, Wenczkowski scored 82 points. In 2019, Wenczkowski was named a Hockey East All star as well as team MVP for UNH. As a senior she served as captain of the UNH Wildcats.

Wenczkowski was drafted in the third round of the 2020 NWHL Draft and signed a one-year deal with the Boston Pride on June 23, 2020. She would win back-to-back Isobel Cup championships with the Pride in 2021 and 2022 where she scored the game winning goal in both championship games, earning the honor of Playoff MVP in the latter year. Wenczkowski was also a finalist for League MVP in 2022 and won the PHF 3 Stars award.

After going undrafted in the 2023 PWHL Draft, Wenczkowski signed with PWHL Boston following their 2023 training camp. After accumulating zero points in the regular season, Wenczkowski would score two playoff goals, including a triple-overtime winner, to help lead Boston to the Walter Cup finals, which they would lose to PWHL Minnesota. On August 11, 2024, Wenczkowski announced she was retiring in order to pursue a career in coaching.

== Coaching career ==
On August 27, 2024, the Princeton Tigers announced they had hired Wenczkowski as an assistant coach. Where she helped Princeton win their first ever ECAC Regular Season chapionship. Wenczkowski was part of the 2026 Ivy League Coaching Staff of the year. Wenczkowski oversaw all player development in her two seasons with Princeton where she coached Top 10 Patty Kazmaier Finalists, ECAC Forward of the year, Ivy League player of the year and many ECAC/ Ivy League All conference players. In her time at Princeton, 3 forwards were drafted to the PWHL, and multiple players were selected to their respective National Teams.

In 2025, Wenczkowski was a guest coach at the NHL Bruins Development camp where she helped lead on ice instruction to NHL Bruins draft picks and prospects along with presenting on player development to the prospects and Bruins coaching staff,

Wenczkowski joined Boston College Eagles as an assistant coach on July 1, 2026 where she looks to make her impact in Hockey East. In her first game behind the Eagles bench, she helped the team to a NCAA record setting win of 17-0.

== Personal life ==
Wenczkowski majored in Psychology with a Minor in Coaching and got her Masters Degree in Kinesiology: Sport Psychology at the University of New Hampshire.

== Career stats ==
			Regular Season					Playoffs
Season	Team	League	GP	G	A	Pts	PIM	GP	G	A	Pts	PIM
2012–13	Boston Shamrocks	JWHL	19	6	2	8	8	—	—	—	—	—
2013–14	Boston Shamrocks	JWHL	26	25	10	35	16	—	—	—	—	—
2014–15	Boston Shamrocks	JWHL	27	23	12	35	8	—	—	—	—	—
2015–16	University of New Hampshire	NCAA	35	4	8	12	8	—	—	—	—	—
2016–17	University of New Hampshire	NCAA	7	2	1	3	4	—	—	—	—	—
2017-18	University of New Hampshire	NCAA	34	9	11	20	14	—	—	—	—	—
2018-19	University of New Hampshire	NCAA	36	20	6	26	22	—	—	—	—	—
2019–20	University of New Hampshire	NCAA	37	7	14	21	43	—	—	—	—	—
2020–21	Boston Pride	NWHL	7	3	1	4	4	2	1	1	2	0
2021–22	Boston Pride	PHF	20	8	7	15	8	3	3	0	3	2
2022–23	Boston Pride	PHF	24	2	7	9	10	2	1	0	1	0
2023–24	PWHL Boston	PWHL	16	0	0	0	2	8	2	0	2	2
PHF/NWHL totals			51	11	14	25	22	7	5	1	6	2
PWHL totals			16	0	0	0	2	8	2	0	2	2

== Honours ==
- 2018-19 Led the UNH Wildcats in goals (20) and points (26)
- 2015-16 Led UNH rookies in goals (4), assists (8) and points (12).
- 2022 Isobel Cup Playoff MVP
