= Russ McCurdy =

American women's ice hockey coach

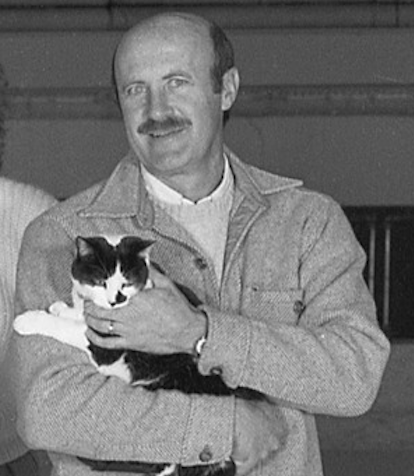
- McCurdy and his cat, Olivia Puck, in a team photo (1987-1988 season)

Biographical details
- Born: August 18, 1939; Pawtucket, Rhode Island
- Died: June 7, 2024 (aged 84); Lee, New Hampshire
- Education: Boston University

Playing career
- 1958–61: Boston Terriers
- 1962–63: US men's national team

Coaching career (HC unless noted)
- 1973–77: Yale Bulldogs (Asst Coach)
- 1977–92: New Hampshire Wildcats
- 1992: US women's national team

Head coaching record
- Overall: 264–36–10

Accomplishments and honors

Championships
- 4× EAIAW regular season (1980–83); 4x ECAC champions (1986, 1987, 1990, 1991)

Russell Joseph McCurdy, Jr., (August 18, 1939 – June 7, 2024) was the first head coach of the University of New Hampshire women's ice hockey team, serving as coach from the program's inception in 1977 to 1992. He has been described as "the father of women's hockey in New Hampshire" and as "the king of women's college hockey." As of the 2024–2025 season, McCurdy has the highest winning percentage of any women's college ice hockey coach.

== Early life ==
McCurdy was born and raised in Pawtucket, Rhode Island, the son of Margaret (née Bresnahan) and Russell Joseph McCurdy. He had one older sister, Carol. Both of his maternal grandparents immigrated to Rhode Island from County Limerick, Ireland, and his paternal grandfather immigrated from County Tyrone in Northern Ireland. He had English and Scottish ancestry from his paternal grandmother.

McCurdy started playing hockey at age 15. He attended LaSalle Academy in Providence, Rhode Island, where he was an all-state hockey player.

== Playing career ==
McCurdy attended Boston University and was a defenseman on the Boston University Terriers men's ice hockey team. During his junior year, he won the Eastern Title for the team by scoring an 80-foot slap shot against St. Lawrence. He graduated in 1962.

From 1962 to 1963, McCurdy played as a defenseman on the United States men's national ice hockey team.

== Coaching career ==
McCurdy began his collegiate coaching career in 1973. His coaching style focused on hockey fundamentals and passing. Many of his practice drills were borrowed from the Soviet Union, which he observed while touring Eastern Europe and the Soviet Union in 1963 for Team USA. He described women's hockey as a game of skill:

"[In women's hockey]the emphasis is on skill, not like in men's hockey, where they try to go out and hurt someone." - Russ McCurdy in the Boston Globe, 1983

=== Yale Bulldogs ===
McCurdy began his collegiate coaching career in 1973 as an assistant coach for the Yale Bulldogs men's ice hockey team where he coached the men's freshman team. During his time at Yale, McCurdy also helped coach the women's team, which was a club program from the 1974-75 season until the 1977-78 season. After four years, McCurdy moved to the University of New Hampshire to start its women's ice hockey program.

=== New Hampshire Wildcats ===
McCurdy became the first head coach for the University of New Hampshire Wildcats women's ice hockey team in 1977. In an interview with the Boston Globe, McCurdy recalled taking the position because he believed "that UNH was "a real co-ed school, a school that would be inclined to give women the commitment to making a program go."" In the team's first game on December 3, 1977, they defeated Colby College 8–4. Led by McCurdy, the inaugural team went undefeated in the 1977–78 season, finishing with a 15–0 record. However, the team faced financial issues, as the school did not budget for additional funds needed for an undefeated team. According to the same Boston Globe article:

Because in its first season as a varsity sport, McCurdy's team went 15–0. That's better than the women at Colby and Cornell, previously considered the best in the East, better than the men at Harvard and BU and almost certainly better than any team has done in its first varsity season at UNH. But the story is 15–0 and no place to go. The team's budget was set at the beginning of the year to include equipment, transportation and some meal money. It did not account for an undefeated season and tournament play.

The team continued to win under McCurdy, remaining undefeated for its first four seasons with a 72–0–1 record. They did not lose a single game until the 1981–1982 season, when it went 18–1–1 and won its second Eastern Association of Intercollegiate Athletics for Women (EAIAW) championship. Under McCurdy's leadership, the team won four EAIAW championships, four Eastern College Athletic Conference (ECAC) championships, and two University Cups for excellence in American and Canadian women's ice hockey.

McCurdy's 100th career coaching victory with UNH took place on February 2, 1983, when the team won 7–1 against Dartmouth in Hanover, NH. His record following the 100th game was 100–1–2.

McCurdy continued to coach the team for 15 years, ending his tenure after the 1991–1992 season, with a winning percentage of .868 and total record of 264–36–10. As of the 2024–2025 season, McCurdy has the highest winning percentage of any women's college ice hockey coach. His winning streak was 74 games.

McCurdy's Record at UNH
| Season | W | L | T | Championships |
|---|---|---|---|---|
| 1977–1978 | 15 | 0 | 0 | |
| 1978–1979 | 16 | 0 | 1 | |
| 1979–1980 | 20 | 0 | 0 | EAIAW Champs |
| 1980–1981 | 21 | 0 | 0 | EAIAW Champs |
| 1981–1982 | 18 | 1 | 1 | EAIAW Champs |
| 1982–1983 | 19 | 1 | 0 | EAIAW Champs |
| 1983–1984 | 16 | 4 | 0 | ECAC Runner-Up |
| 1984–1985 | 18 | 3 | 0 | ECAC Runner-Up |
| 1985–1986 | 18 | 3 | 1 | ECAC Champs |
| 1986–1987 | 18 | 1 | 3 | ECAC Champs |
| 1987–1988 | 15 | 5 | 1 | |
| 1988–1989 | 16 | 6 | 0 | |
| 1989–1990 | 20 | 3 | 1 | ECAC Champs |
| 1990–1991 | 19 | 3 | 0 | ECAC Champs |
| 1991–1992 | 15 | 6 | 2 | ECAC Runner-Up |
| OVERALL | 264 | 36 | 10 | |

==== Olivia Puck the Cat ====
Olivia Puck was McCurdy's black-and-white cat during his tenure as head coach at UNH. She often accompanied McCurdy to practices, although she was not always a fan of coming to the rink. Olivia makes an appearance in most of the official team photos.

=== U.S. National Women's Ice Hockey ===
In 1992, McCurdy was selected as the head coach of the U.S. National Women's Ice Hockey team. Under McCurdy's leadership, the team competed at the 1992 IIHF Women's World Championship from April 20 – 26 in Tampere, Finland. The team won their first four games, beating Switzerland (17–0), Norway (9–1), Finland (5–3), and Sweden (6–4) in the semifinals, before losing to Canada in the finals (0–8). Overall, the team brought home silver.

=== Brown Bears ===
In 1995, McCurdy acted as assistant coach for the Brown Bears women's ice hockey team at Brown University while head coach, Digit Murphy, was on parental leave. Murphy was an assistant coach on the 1992 U.S. National Women's Ice Hockey team while McCurdy served as head coach. In an interview with Forbes, Murphy cited McCurdy as a valuable mentor.

=== Honors and awards ===
McCurdy received The Joe Burke Award, presented annually to a person who has given outstanding contribution, support, and dedication to women's ice hockey, in 2001.

In 2002, McCurdy was inducted into the UNH Athletics Hall of Fame for his work as a women's hockey coach at UNH.

In 2006, the University of New Hampshire athletic department dedicated the Russell J. McCurdy Gallery in the Whittemore Center which displays the women's teams photos and headshots.

== Other ==
Before his coaching career, McCurdy was in the U.S. Army Intelligence Corps and was based in Germany. He was an investigator for the U.S. Civil Service Commission and a Foreign Service reserve officer with the U.S. Department of State.

While at UNH, McCurdy also coached the women's tennis team for the 1983–1991 seasons, until the team was cut due to budget constraints in Summer 1991. McCurdy remained an avid tennis player throughout his life.

== Personal life ==
McCurdy met his wife, Sheila (née Berg), at the University of New Hampshire. They lived in Lee, New Hampshire.

== See also ==
- List of college women's ice hockey career coaching wins leaders
