= 1992 IIHF Women's World Championship =

Tournament details
- Host country: Finland
- Dates: April 20–26, 1992
- Opened by: Mauno Koivisto
- Teams: 8

Final positions
- Champions: Canada (2nd title)
- Runners-up: United States
- Third place: Finland
- Fourth place: Sweden

Tournament statistics
- Games played: 20
- Goals scored: 163 (8.15 per game)
- Attendance: 18,540 (927 per game)
- Scoring leader: (United States) Cammi Granato (8+2=10pts)

The 1992 IIHF Women's World Championships was held April 20–26, 1992, in Tampere in Finland. Team Canada won their second gold medal at the World Championships, defeating the United States.

== Qualification ==
The tournament was held between eight teams. Canada and the United States received automatic qualification to the tournament. In addition, the top five teams from the 1991 European Championship would be joined by the winner of the 1992 Asian Qualification Tournament.

- Canada – Automatically Qualified
- China - Winner – 1992 Asian Qualification Tournament
- Denmark – 3rd Place – 1991 European Championship
- Finland – Winner – 1991 European Championship
- Norway – 4th place – 1991 European Championship
- Switzerland – 5th place – 1991 European Championship
- Sweden – 2nd Place – 1991 European Championship
- United States – Automatically Qualified

=== Asian Qualification Tournament (China) ===
1 January 1991	China	10-0	Japan	Baqu Arena, Harbin

3 January 1991	China	7-3	Japan	Baqu Arena, Harbin

== Final tournament ==
The eight participating teams were divided up into two seeded groups as below. The teams played each other once in a single round robin format. The top two teams from the group proceeded to the Final Round, while the remaining teams played in the consolation round.

== First round ==
=== Group A ===
==== Standings ====
Pos	Team	Pld	W	D	L	GF	GA	GD	Pts	Qualification
1	Canada	3	3	0	0	24	1	+23	6	Advanced to Final round
2	Sweden	3	2	0	1	11	9	+2	4	Advanced to Final round
3	China	3	1	0	2	7	16	−9	2	Sent to Consolation round
4	Denmark	3	0	0	3	3	19	−16	0	Sent to Consolation round

Source: Hockey Canada

==== Results ====
All times local (UTC+4)

April 20, 1992	Canada	8–0 (3 – 0, 4 – 0, 1 – 0)	China	Tampere, Finland

April 20, 1992	Sweden	4–1 (2 – 1, 1 – 0, 1 – 0)	Denmark	Tampere, Finland

April 21, 1992	China	2–6 (1 – 1, 1 – 2, 0 – 3)	Sweden	Tampere, Finland

April 21, 1992	Denmark	0–10 (0 – 4, 0 – 2, 0 – 4)	Canada	Tampere, Finland

April 23, 1992	Denmark	2–5 (0 – 0, 1 – 2, 1 – 3)	China	Tampere, Finland

April 23, 1992	Canada	6–1 (2 – 0, 1 – 0, 3 – 1)	Sweden	Tampere, Finland

=== Group B ===
==== Standings ====
Pos	Team	Pld	W	D	L	GF	GA	GD	Pts	Qualification
1	United States	3	3	0	0	31	4	+27	6	Advanced to Final round
2	Finland	3	2	0	1	27	9	+18	4	Advanced to Final round
3	Norway	3	1	0	2	8	21	−13	2	Sent to Consolation round
4	Switzerland	3	0	0	3	2	34	−32	0	Sent to Consolation round

Source: Hockey Canada

==== Results ====
All times local (UTC+4)

April 20, 1992	United States	17–0 (6 – 0, 4 – 0, 7 – 0)	Switzerland	Tampere, Finland

April 20, 1992	Finland	11–3 (6 – 1, 2 – 2, 3 – 0)	Norway	Tampere, Finland

April 21, 1992	Norway	1–9 (1 – 1, 0 – 4, 0 – 4)	United States	Tampere, Finland

April 21, 1992	Switzerland	1–13 (0 – 2, 0 – 8, 1 – 3)	Finland	Tampere, Finland

April 23, 1992	Norway	4–1 (1 – 0, 2 – 0, 1 – 1)	Switzerland	Tampere, Finland

April 23, 1992	Finland	3–5 (2 – 1, 1 – 1, 0 – 3)	United States	Tampere, Finland

== Playoff round ==
=== Consolation round 5–8 Place ===
April 24, 1992	China	2–1 (1–0, 0–1, 0–1, 0–0, 1–0)	Switzerland	Tampere, Finland

April 24, 1992	Norway	2–0 (1 – 0, 1 – 0, 0 – 0)	Denmark	Tampere, Finland

=== Consolation round 7–8 Place ===
April 26, 1992	Denmark	4–3 (2 – 2, 0 – 1, 1 – 0, 1 – 0)	Switzerland	Tampere, Finland

=== Consolation round 5–6 Place ===
April 26, 1992	Norway	1–2 (0 – 1, 0 – 0, 1 – 1)	China	Tampere, Finland

=== Final round ===
Semi finals 25 April 1992
A1	Canada	6
B2	Finland	2
B1	United States	6
A2	Sweden	4

Finals; 26 April 1992
Canada	8
United States	0
Bronze Medal Game (GWS)
Sweden	4
Finland	5

=== Semifinals ===
April 25, 1992	Canada	6–2 (4 – 0, 2 – 2, 0 – 0)	Finland	Tampere, Finland

April 25, 1992	United States	6–4 (2 – 2, 2 – 0, 2 – 2)	Sweden	Tampere, Finland

=== Match for third place ===
April 26, 1992	Sweden	4–5 (1 – 1, 1 – 2, 2 – 1, 0 – 0, 0 – 1)	Finland	Tampere, Finland

=== Final ===
April 26, 1992	Canada	8–0 (3 – 0, 2 – 0, 3 – 0)	United States	Tampere, Finland

Referee: Sandra Dombrowski

== Champions ==
1992 IIHF World Women Championship winners

Canada
2nd title

== Scoring leaders ==
Player	GP	G	A	Pts	PIM
(United States) Cammi Granato	5	8	2	10	2
(Canada) Danielle Goyette	5	3	7	10	2
(Canada) Andria Hunter	5	5	4	9	0
(United States) Lisa Brown	5	2	7	9	8
(United States) Shelley Looney	5	1	8	9	2
(Finland) Riikka Nieminen	5	6	2	8	0
(Canada) France St. Louis	5	5	3	8	2
(Canada) Nancy Drolet	5	4	4	8	0
(United States) Jeanine Sobek	5	3	5	8	0
(United States) Karyn Bye	5	3	5	8	2

== Goaltending leaders ==
Only the top five goaltenders, based on save percentage, who have played 40% of their team's minutes are included in this list.

Player	Mins	GA	GAA	SV%
(Canada) Marie Claude Roy	120	1	0.50	95.83
(Canada) Manon Rhéaume	180	2	0.67	95.74
(Sweden) Annica Åhlén	190	8	2.53	91.58
(Denmark) Lane Rasmussen	305	24	4.72	88.35
(Finland) Katariina Ahonen	149	5	2.01	88.10

TOI = Time on ice (minutes:seconds); SA = Shots against; GA = Goals against; GAA = Goals against average; Sv% = Save percentage; SO = Shutouts Source: IIHF.com

== Final standings ==
Rk.	Team
1st place, gold medalist(s)	Canada
2nd place, silver medalist(s)	United States
3rd place, bronze medalist(s)	Finland
4.	Sweden
5.	China
6.	Norway
7.	Denmark
8.	Switzerland

== Directorate Awards ==
- Goaltender: (Sweden) Annica Ahlen
- Defenceman: (Canada) Geraldine Heaney
- Forward: (United States) Cammi Granato

The international media voted on the tournament all-star team at the conclusion of the event. The following players were named:

Position	Player	Team
G	Manon Rhéaume	Canada
D	Geraldine Heaney	Canada
D	Ellen Weinberg	United States
F	Riikka Nieminen	Finland
F	Angela James	Canada
F	Cammi Granato	United States

== Staff and Players ==
Staff Roster
Position	Name	Team	State/Province
Head Coach	Russ McCurdy	United States	New Hampshire
Assistant Coach	Margaret Degidio Murphy	United States	Rhode Island
Assistant Coach	Laura Halldorson	United States	Maine
Assistant Coach	Lee Hunsaker	United States	Maine
Trainer	Stephanie Hart	United States	Massachusetts
Physician	Dr. Lisa Arendt	United States	Minnesota
Equipment Manager	Jack French	United States	New Hampshire
General Manager	Bob Allen	United States	New York
Assistant General Manager	Lynn Olson	United States	Minnesota
Head Coach	Rick Polutnik	Canada	Alberta
Assistant Coach	Shannon Miller (ice hockey)	Canada	Alberta
Assistant Coach	Pierre Charette	Canada	Quebec
Physician	Dr. Heather Coombs	Canada	Quebec
Physiotherapist	Tara Sutherland	Canada	Alberta
Equipment Manager	Ross Antworth	Canada	New Brunswick
CAHA	Bob Nicholson	Canada	Ontario
CAHA	Glynis Peters	Canada	Ontario
CAHA	Phil Legault	Canada	Ontario
Head Coach	Jouko Öystilä	Finland	
Assistant Coach	Jorma Välimäki	Finland	
Head Coach	Dion "Skipper" Christiansen	Denmark	

Head coaches included Rick Polutnik (Canada), Russ McCurdy (United States), and Juoko Öystilä (Finland).
