= Megan Myers =

American ice hockey player (born 1992)

- Born: January 24, 1992 (age 34) Las Vegas, Nevada, United States
- Height: 5 ft 6 in (168 cm)
- Weight: 165 lb (75 kg; 11 st 11 lb)
- Position: Forward
- Shoots: Left
- PWHPA team Former teams: Independent; Boston Blades; Utica Pioneers
- Playing career: 2010–present

Megan Jane Myers (born January 24, 1992) is an American ice hockey player, currently affiliated with the Professional Women's Hockey Players Association (PWHPA).

== Playing career ==
Growing up in Las Vegas, Myers began playing ice hockey at the age of eight, having previously played soccer. She played for the Anaheim Lady Ducks and Los Angeles Selects in her youth.

From 2010 to 2014, she attended Utica College in Utica, New York. Across 104 NCAA Division III games with the Utica Pioneers, she scored 143 points, leading the team in scoring every single year. She was named to ECAC West All-Conference Teams in all four seasons, including First Team in 2012 and 2013, and was a CCM All-American in 2013.

She was selected 47th overall by the Canadian Women's Hockey League's Boston Blades in the 2014 CWHL Draft. After graduating, she signed her first professional contract with the Blades. She scored 2 points in 12 games in her rookie CWHL season as the Blades won the Clarkson Cup. As the team moved to Worcester for the 2018–19 season, she was named team captain.

After the collapse of the CWHL in May 2019, she joined the players forming the Professional Women's Hockey Players Association. She was affiliated with the New England chapter of the PWHPA during the 2019–20 season and scored both goals in the New England chapter's first exhibition game of the season, a 3–2 loss to the Boston College Eagles. She chose to stay with the PWHPA for the 2020–21 season, playing as an independent member.

On August 12, 2021, Stonehill College's inaugural women's hockey head coach, Tara Watchorn, and director of athletics, Dean O'Keefe announced that Megan Myers was named the school's first full-time assistant coach in anticipation of joining the New England Women's Hockey Alliance (NEWHA) for the 2022-23 academic year.

== Personal life ==
Myers was born on January 24, 1992, in Las Vegas, Nevada to Laurie and Mike Myers. Her father currently serves as director of the Portland Bureau of Emergency Management (PBEM) in Portland, Oregon and previously served as chief of the Las Vegas Fire Department, the fire department of St. Charles, Missouri, and the Portland Fire Bureau. She has a younger sister, Taylor.

Myers attended Arbor View High School in Las Vegas, Nevada.

Since 2015, she has served as an assistant coach for the Hawks women's ice hockey team of Becker College in Central Massachusetts.
