= 2019–20 PWHPA season =

- League: Professional Women's Hockey Players Association
- Sport: Ice hockey
- Duration: September 2019 – March 2020
- Season champions: Various

PWHPA seasons
- 2020–21

The 2019–20 PWHPA season was the first season organized by the Professional Women's Hockey Players Association (PWHPA). The organization was established after the collapse of the Canadian Women's Hockey League in May, 2019. The PWHPA organized a boycott of the National Women's Hockey League (NWHL) as part of its efforts to agitate for the establishment of a new, unified women's professional league. As part of its boycott, the PWHPA organized a series of exhibition games and events beginning in September 2019, which was ultimately cut short by the COVID-19 pandemic in March 2020.

== Business ==
The PWHPA signed a number of corporate sponsorship agreements in 2019, and named Adidas, Budweiser, Dunkin' Donuts, Secret, and the National Hockey League Players' Association (NHLPA) as its "premiere partners". In November 2019, Budweiser produced a two minute advertisement for the PWHPA, set to the tune of The Hockey Song and featuring a number of PWHPA players and figures from the hockey community, calling for better support for women's hockey with the tagline "This game is for us all."

The PWHPA set up regional training hubs in Montreal, Mississauga, Markham, Calgary, Boston, Buffalo, Minnesota, and the Northeast United States, where players could practice multiple times a week.

After having spent most of the season with the PWHPA, Jordan Juron became the first PWHPA player to rejoin the NWHL in January 2020, signing with the Boston Pride.

== Dream Gap Tour ==
Due to their boycott, the members of the PWHPA decided to compete against one another on a tour to various North American cities, creating a series of exhibitions called the Dream Gap Tour. Each showcase had players divided into teams, with each team named after a particular player as captain.

The first showcase was held in Toronto at Westwood Arena from September 21 to 22, 2019, and was sponsored by Unifor. Team captains were Rebecca Johnston, Brianne Jenner, Liz Knox, and Marie-Philip Poulin, with the four teams playing a round-robin tournament. The second series of showcases took place in Hudson, New Hampshire from October 5 to 6 and was sponsored by Dunkin' Donuts. All games were contested at Cyclones Arena. Team captains were Kali Flanagan, Hilary Knight, Jocelyne and Monique Lamoureux, and Lee Stecklein. The Hudson event series had two games on the first day and two on the second and adopted a playoff-style format. The second day's games had the losers from the previous day face each other in a consolation game and the winners play each other in a championship game. The third showcase was held in Chicago at the Chicago Blackhawks' practice rink, Fifth Third Arena, from October 18 to 20 and was sponsored by the Magellan Corporation. Team captains were former Olympic players Lori Dupuis and Jayna Hefford from Canada, and Hockey Hall of Fame players Cammi Granato and Angela Ruggiero, both part of the United States gold-medal winning team at the 1998 Winter Olympics. The playoff-style format from the Hudson event was retained.

In January 2020, an expanded showcase sponsored by Secret was held in Greater Toronto from January 11 to 12. The National Hockey League's Toronto Maple Leafs sponsored an outdoor skills competition. The showcase consisted of six teams captained by Kacey Bellamy, Kendall Coyne Schofield, Catherine Daoust, Amanda Kessel, Jocelyne Larocque, and Natalie Spooner. The next stop was in Voorhees, New Jersey, outside Philadelphia, from February 29 to March 1, with team captains Brianna Decker, Megan Keller, Sarah Nurse, and Blayre Turnbull.

For the Dream Gap Tour's final stop, the PWHPA partnered with the NHL's Arizona Coyotes with games held in Tempe, Arizona, at Oceanside Ice Arena from March 6 to 8. There were two PWHPA teams, each captained by Arizona natives Makenna Newkirk and Katie McGovern, that played each other twice. A PWHPA team then played a team composed of Coyotes' alumni.

The PWHPA was due to play a one-week tour in Tokyo in a three-game series against the Japanese national team. On February 24, 2020, it was announced that the tour was cancelled due to the COVID-19 pandemic in Japan.

=== Schedule and results ===
Showcase	Arena	Date	Team	Score	Team
Toronto	Westwood Arena	September 21	Team Johnston	3–4	Team Jenner
Toronto	Westwood Arena	September 21	Team Poulin	2–1	Team Knox
Toronto	Westwood Arena	September 22	Team Johnston	6–5	Team Knox
Toronto	Westwood Arena	September 22	Team Poulin	5–1	Team Jenner
Hudson	Cyclones Arena	October 5	Team Flanagan	3–6	Team Stecklein
Hudson	Cyclones Arena	October 5	Team Knight	3–1	Team Lamoureux
Hudson	Cyclones Arena	October 6	Team Lamoureux	5–2	Team Flanagan
Hudson	Cyclones Arena	October 6	Team Stecklein	5–4	Team Knight
Chicago	Fifth Third Arena	October 19	Team Hefford	5–4	Team Dupuis
Chicago	Fifth Third Arena	October 19	Team Granato	4–2	Team Ruggiero
Chicago	Fifth Third Arena	October 20	Team Ruggiero	6–4	Team Dupuis
Chicago	Fifth Third Arena	October 20	Team Granato	4–1	Team Hefford
Toronto	Herbert H. Carnegie Centennial Centre (North York)	January 11	Team Larocque	5–4 (OT)	Team Kessel
Toronto	Herbert H. Carnegie Centennial Centre (North York)	January 11	Team Bellamy	3–6	Team Daoust
Toronto	Herbert H. Carnegie Centennial Centre (North York)	January 11	Team Spooner	3–6	Team Coyne
Toronto	Herbert H. Carnegie Centennial Centre (North York)	January 12	Team Kessel	0–1	Team Bellamy
Toronto	Al Palladini Community Center (Vaughan)	January 12	Team Coyne	5–2	Team Larocque
Toronto	Mattamy Athletic Centre	January 12	Team Daoust	8–0	Team Spooner
Philadelphia	Virtua Flyers Skate Zone (Voorhees, New Jersey)	February 29	Team Turnbull	7–2	Team Nurse
Philadelphia	Virtua Flyers Skate Zone (Voorhees, New Jersey)	February 29	Team Decker	2–6	Team Keller
Philadelphia	Virtua Flyers Skate Zone (Voorhees, New Jersey)	March 1	Team Decker	3–2	Team Nurse
Philadelphia	Virtua Flyers Skate Zone (Voorhees, New Jersey)	March 1	Team Keller	3–4 (OT)	Team Turnbull
Arizona	Oceanside Ice Arena (Tempe, Arizona)	March 6	Team McGovern	2–1	Team Newkirk
Arizona	Oceanside Ice Arena (Tempe, Arizona)	March 7	Team McGovern	2–3	Team Newkirk
Arizona	Oceanside Ice Arena (Tempe, Arizona)	March 8	PWHPA	4–6	Coyotes Alumni

== 2020 NHL All-Star Game ==
Several PWHPA players were invited to participate in the 2020 NHL All-Star Game, featuring in the Elite Women's 3-on-3 Game held on the night of the Skills Competition.

== 2020 ECHL All-Star Classic ==
Four PWHPA members were invited to participate in the 2020 ECHL All-Star Classic in Wichita, Kansas, in January 2020. The four players, all members of the American national team, were Annie Pankowski, Gigi Marvin, Dani Cameranesi, and Kali Flanagan. They participated in both the skills competitions and the 3-on-3 tournament.

During the skills competitions, Cameranesi and Flanagan participated in the fastest skater competition and were estimated to have finished with times between 12 and 14 seconds. Marvin and Pankowski participated in the shot accuracy competition with times that would have placed both of them in the top three.

During the 3-on-3 tournament, Marvin played for Team West, Panowski for Team Bolts, Flanagan for Team East, and Cameranesi for Team Hammers. Marvin notched the first point by any female player with an assist on Taylor Richart's goal in the first game. In the third game, Panowski became the first to score a goal, scoring 37 seconds into the first period. Flanagan scored the game-winning goal in the tournament's championship game.

== Other events ==
On September 22, 2019, sixteen members of the PWHPA played a team made up of San Jose Sharks alumni as part of the Sharks' Fan Fest. The next day, members of the PWHPA's New England hub faced off against the Boston College Eagles women's hockey team, losing 3–2 to the Eagles, with Megan Myers scoring both PWHPA goals.

On December 28, 2019, the PWHPA hosted a double-header event at the Place Bell in Laval, Quebec, with a match between the American Hockey League's Laval Rocket and Toronto Marlies and then one between the PWHPA's Montreal and Minnesota hub teams.

At the beginning of January 2020, a rally was held with youth players and former CWHL players in three Canadian cities, dubbed the Secret Equal Sweat, Equal Opportunity Skate Rally.

== See also ==
- 2019–20 NWHL season
