= Hilary Knight =

American ice hockey player (born 1989)

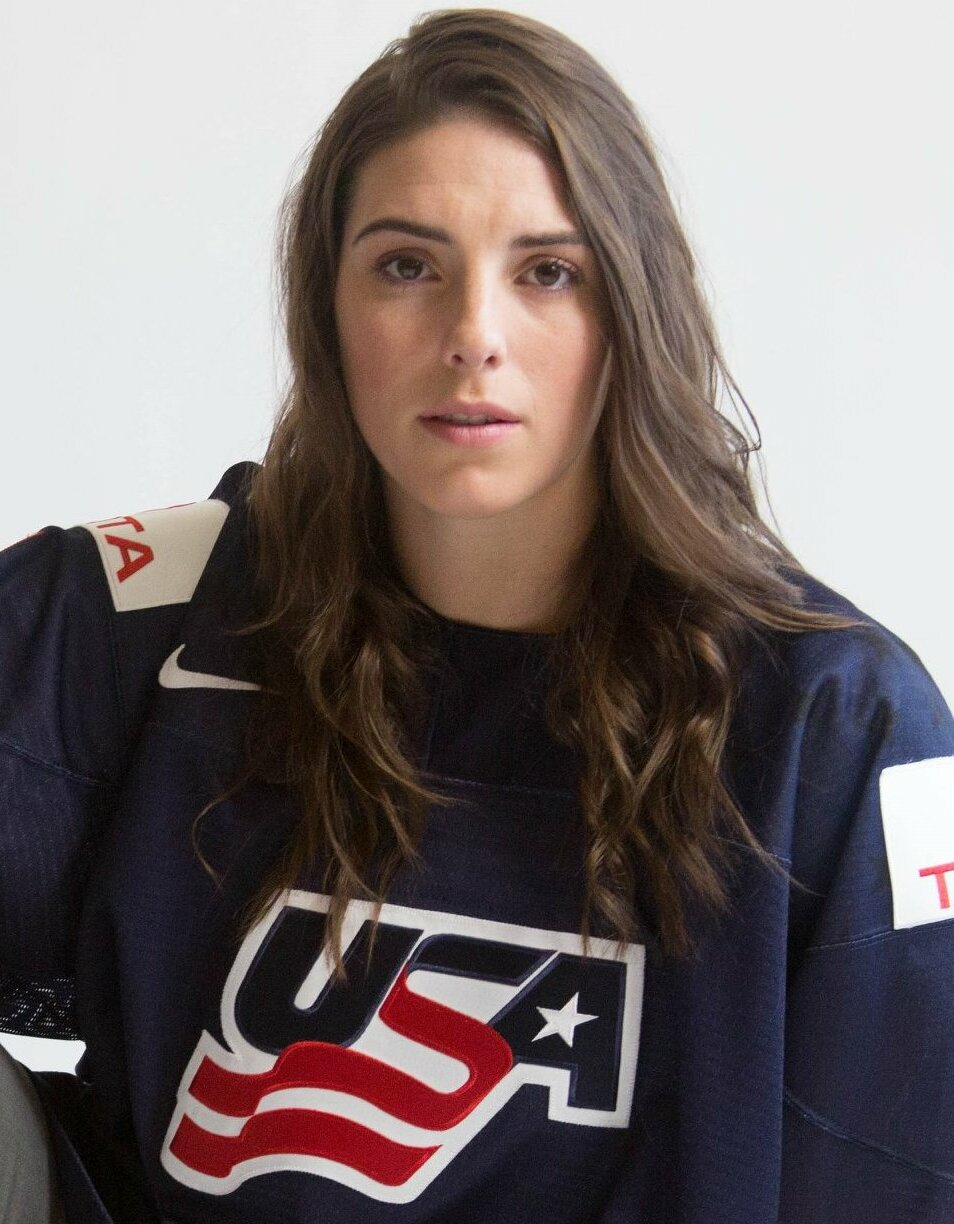
- Knight in 2018
- Born: July 12, 1989 (age 37) Palo Alto, California, US
- Height: 5 ft 11 in (180 cm)
- Weight: 172 lb (78 kg; 12 st 4 lb)
- Position: Forward
- Shoots: Right
- PWHL team Former teams: Detroit Clutch; Seattle Torrent; Boston Fleet; Les Canadiennes de Montreal; Boston Pride; Boston Blades
- National team: United States
- Playing career: 2006–present
- Website: hilary-knight.com

Hilary Atwood Knight (born July 12, 1989) is an American professional ice hockey player who is a forward and captain for the Detroit Clutch in the Professional Women's Hockey League (PWHL). She is also captain of the United States women's national ice hockey team. Widely regarded as one of the greatest players in women's hockey history, Knight holds numerous records and has been considered a dominant force in both international and professional hockey for nearly two decades.

With the US national team, Knight has won eleven gold medals at the IIHF Women's World Championship—the most ever by any hockey player—and holds the tournament records for goals, assists, and points. She is a five-time Olympic medalist, winning gold in 2018 and 2026 and winning silver in 2010, 2014, and 2022. She was a flag bearer at the closing ceremony of the 2026 Winter Olympics. In 2023, she became the first player in IIHF World Women's Championship history to surpass 100 career points and was named the inaugural recipient of the IIHF Female Player of the Year award. She has earned multiple tournament MVP honors, including at the 2015 and 2016 World Championships, where she was also the leading scorer.

Knight played college hockey at the University of Wisconsin from 2007 to 2012, where she won two NCAA national championships (2009, 2011), earned the 2011 NCAA Tournament MVP award, and became the program's all-time leader in goals (143) and points (262). Her 143 career goals are the most by any women's or men's player at the university. She was a three-time Western Collegiate Hockey Association (WCHA) Offensive Player of the Year and made the All-American First Team.

In professional hockey, she won the inaugural Isobel Cup with the Boston Pride of the National Women's Hockey League (NWHL) in 2016 and has been a scoring leader across multiple leagues during her time with Boston Blades and Les Canadiennes de Montréal of the Canadian Women's Hockey League (CWHL) and the Boston Fleet of the Professional Women's Hockey League (PWHL). In the PWHL's 2024–25 season, she tied for the league lead with 29 points, earning the Points Leader Award, and was named a finalist for Forward of the Year and the Billie Jean King MVP Award. Knight has served as captain for both Team USA (since 2023) and the Boston Fleet (2024–2025) before becoming the first player and captain of the expansion Seattle Torrent in 2025.

Beyond her on-ice achievements, Knight has been a leading advocate for equity and sustainability in women's professional hockey, playing a key role in the formation of the Professional Women's Hockey Players Association and the establishment of the PWHL. She has received three USA Hockey Bob Allen Women's Player of the Year awards (2014, 2022, 2025) and was named to Forbes' 30 Under 30 list in 2018.

== Early life ==
Hilary Atwood Knight was born on July 12, 1989, in Palo Alto, California, to Cynthia and Jim Knight. She has three younger brothers. When Hilary was five, the family moved to Lake Forest, Illinois where she began playing ice hockey and played on boys teams. The family later moved to Hanover, New Hampshire.

External videos
- Hilary Knight Chases Olympic Gold For US women's hockey, NBC Nightly News retrieved November 29, 2025

From an early age, Knight was determined to reach the Olympics. As a young child, she told her grandmother "I'm going to the Olympics" and wrote a book for a second grade school project about a girl with a magical hockey stick who achieved that dream. She honed her skills by watching National Hockey League (NHL) players and emulating their hand and footwork, creating difficult challenges and targets in the family garage to improve her puck control. Growing up, Knight's favorite player was Cammi Granato, and would end up wearing the number 21 as a tribute to her.

As a high schooler, Knight attended Choate Rosemary Hall, a private boarding school in Connecticut with a renowned hockey program. When the national team visited the school in 2005, it strengthened her Olympic aspirations.

== Playing career ==
=== Wisconsin Badgers, 2007–2012 ===
External videos
- Hilary Knight on How Wisconsin Helped Her Achieve International Dreams retrieved November 29, 2025

Knight attended the University of Wisconsin where she played for the Badgers from 2007 to 2012. Her 143 career goals are the most by any men's or women's player at UW. Knight helped lead the Badgers to two NCAA titles in 2009 and 2011.

During her freshman season from 2007–2008, Knight ranked second on the team in goals (20) and tied for fifth on the team in assists (18). Her points total of 38 was third overall in team scoring. She ranked seventh in the nation in points per game for rookies and game-winning goals. During the season, Knight had 12 multi-point games (ranked third). For the season, Knight led the team in game-winning goals with six. On February 2, Knight recorded a hat trick against WCHA rival North Dakota.

As a sophomore, Knight appeared in 39 games for the Badgers. Knight led the NCAA in goal scoring (45) and points (83). Her 16 power-play goals ranked first in the NCAA. Based on her statistical accomplishments, Knight became the new Badgers record-holder for points, goals, and power-play goals in one season. She recorded 24 multi-point games, 13 multi-goal games, and 11 multi-assist games. On September 27, 2008, versus the Quinnipiac Bobcats, Knight scored a career-high (and school record) five goals in one game. In the process, she recorded her first natural hat trick. Versus WCHA rival North Dakota (on November 16), Knight scored her second hat trick of the season. During the Frozen Four, Knight led the team in scoring with six points (three goals and three assists). From September 26 to October 31, Knight had a nine-game point-scoring streak. She ended the season with a six-game point streak.

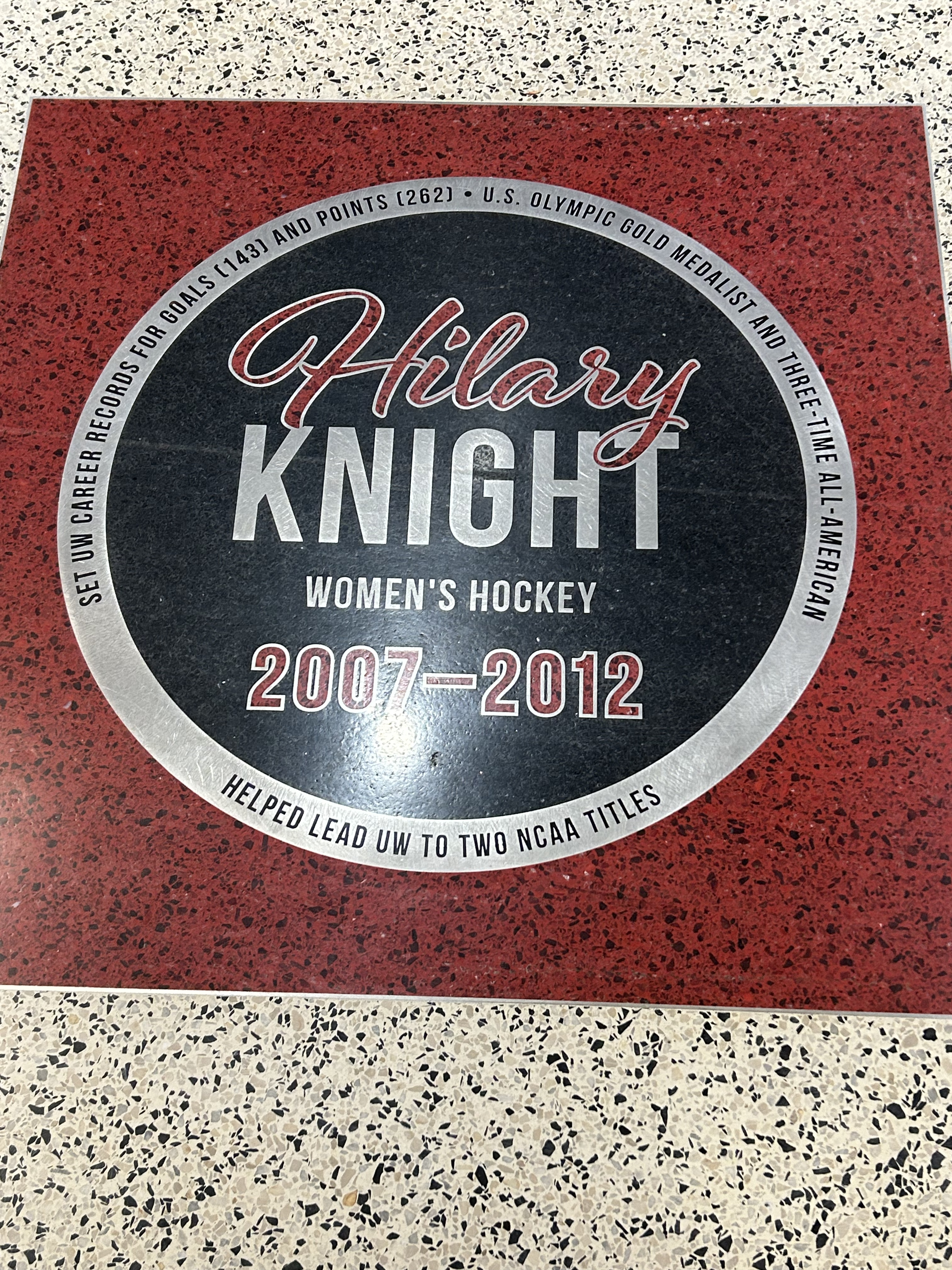
Tile at the Kohl Center recognizing Knight's achievements with the Wisconsin Badgers women's ice hockey team

On October 2, 2010, Knight notched a five-point game in a 6–0 victory over RPI. She had a natural hat trick to start the game and then had two assists. On January 14 and 16, 2011, Knight produced eight scoring points while leading the Badgers to a two-game sweep of St. Cloud State. Knight accumulated five points on three goals and two assists in the January 14, 10–0 win. On the 16th, she had two more goals and one assist for three points as the Badgers won 6–0. Of her five goals, two were scored on the power play, and one of the goals on January 14 was the game-winner. With the sweep, the Badgers increased their winning streak to 10 straight games. Knight was the top goal scorer in Div. 1 women's hockey this season with 31. On February 5, 2011, Knight scored her 36th goal of the year at 2:46 in the overtime period as Wisconsin defeated the Bemidji State Beavers by a 3–2 mark at the Sanford Center. Bemidji State goalie Alana McElhinney made 43 saves on the night, including 24 in the second period.

On September 25, 2011, Knight scored her fifth career hat trick in a 13–0 defeat of the Lindenwood Lady Lions ice hockey program. In a December 10, 2011, WCHA contest versus Bemidji State, Knight produced four points, giving her a career total of 239. She has now surpassed Meghan Duggan's 238 career points to become the Wisconsin Badgers' all-time leading point scorer. For her efforts, Knight was recognized as the WCHA Player of the Week. On January 28, 2012, the Badgers hosted a record crowd of 12,402 that attended the Kohl Center as Wisconsin swept the Bemidji State Beavers. Knight notched her first goal since December 10 with 7:38 left in the third period. Said goal would stand as the game-winner on Fill the Bowl night. She graduated with 262 career points and is the Badgers all-time leader in goals (143), game-winning goals (30), power-play goals (37), and short-handed goals (8).

=== Boston Blades (CWHL), 2012–2015 ===
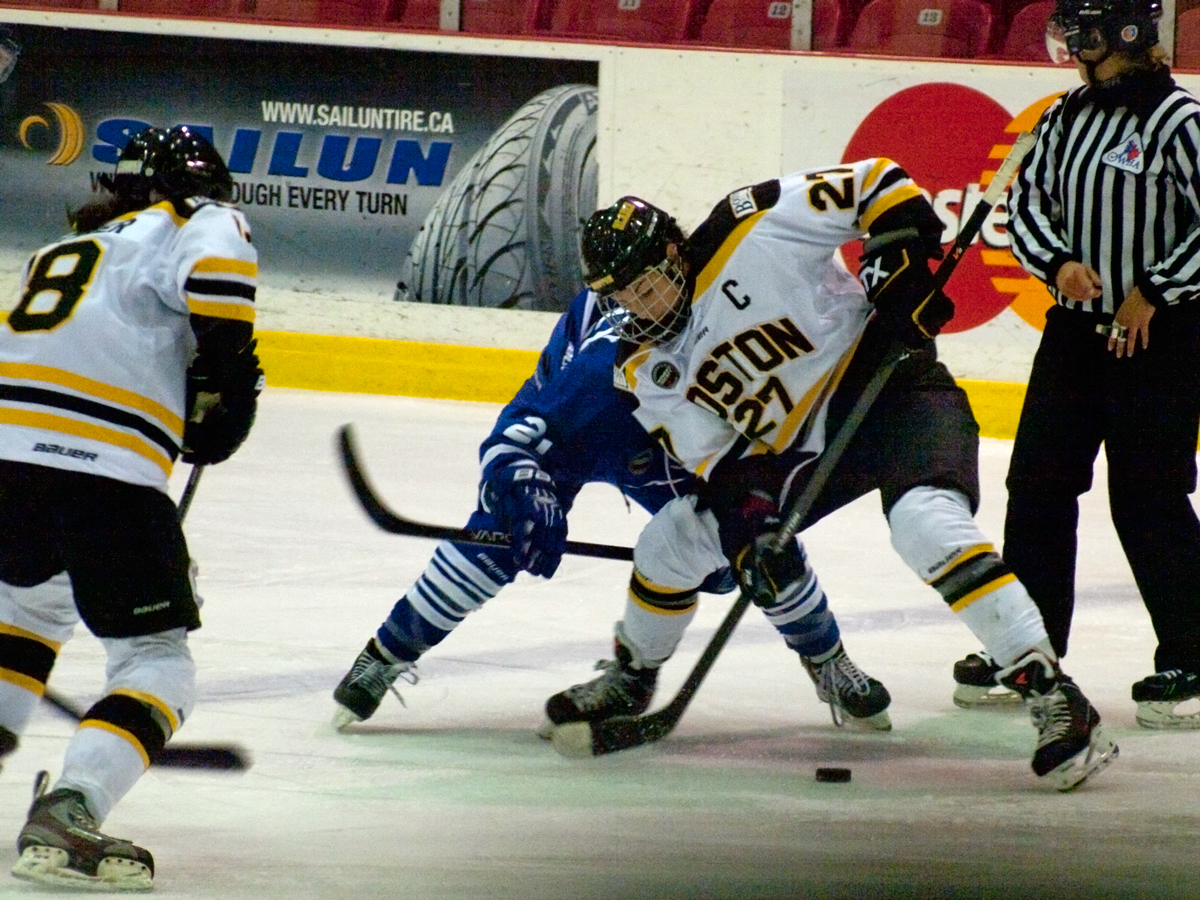
Captain Knight with the Boston Blades, 2014

Selected fourth overall by the Boston Blades in the 2012 CWHL Draft, Knight made an immediate impact in her rookie professional season. During the 2012-13 season, she recorded 32 points in 24 games as the Blades captured both the regular season championship and the Clarkson Cup, becoming only the second American-based team to win the championship. Knight became the first American-born player to win the CWHL's Most Valuable Player Award, while also serving as the leading scorer in the postseason as Boston defeated the Montreal Stars in the championship final. Over her three seasons with the Blades from 2012 to 2015, Knight totaled 29 goals and 33 assists in 41 regular-season games.

Knight helped lead the Blades to a second Clarkson Cup championship in 2015, when Boston finished the regular season with the best record in the CWHL at 15-2-1-6. In the 2015 Clarkson Cup finals against the Montreal Stars, Knight scored a hat trick in Game 2 and finished with five points in the contest, helping Boston secure a commanding series lead. The Blades ultimately won the championship when Janine Weber scored the overtime-winning goal in the decisive game, with Knight earning First Star honors in the final match. During her time with the Blades, Knight also made history as the first female skater (non-goaltender) to practice with an NHL team when she trained with the Anaheim Ducks during the 2014-15 season.

=== Boston Pride (NWHL), 2015–2018 ===
On September 25, 2015, Knight moved to the Boston Pride of the National Women's Hockey League (NWHL), joining the newly formed professional league in its inaugural season. In her first game with the Boston Pride, she scored the team's first goal and went on to score a second goal in the same game. Knight's offensive prowess continued throughout the season as she led the league in scoring, becoming the NWHL's first-ever scoring champion and establishing herself as one of the league's premier players.

In the playoffs, Knight scored the overtime-winning goal in Game 1 of the 2016 Isobel Cup finals. Boston went on to capture the inaugural Isobel Cup, with Knight playing a central role in bringing the first professional championship to the franchise.

Knight continued to showcase her talents in the league's All-Star festivities. In February 2017, representing Team Kessel at the 2nd NWHL All-Star Game, she found the back of the net once again, demonstrating her consistent ability to perform on the league's biggest stages.

During her time with the Pride, Knight served as a prominent face of the NWHL, helping to raise the profile of women's professional hockey through both her on-ice performance and her advocacy for the league.

=== Les Canadiennes de Montreal (CWHL), 2018–2019 ===
On March 8, 2018, Les Canadiennes de Montreal announced that Knight would be joining the team in time for the 2018 CWHL playoff run, making her the first 2018 USA Olympian to sign with a professional team following the Americans' gold medal victory in PyeongChang. Knight's signing with Les Canadiennes was significant as it saw her depart the NWHL for the CWHL, stating that when she plays somewhere, she views it as endorsing that league and what they provide to players, fans, and the game's development.

Knight returned to Les Canadiennes for the full 2018-19 CWHL season, joining a roster that would reunite her with Marie-Philip Poulin, marking the first time in their careers that the two rivals-turned-teammates would play together. In the playoffs, Knight was a dominant force. Knight and Jill Saulnier had impressive postseason showings, driving offense for Les Canadiennes throughout their playoff run. Les Canadiennes advanced to the 2019 Clarkson Cup final to face the Calgary Inferno, though they played without captain Marie-Philip Poulin, who was sidelined with a lower-body injury sustained in the final regular-season game. In the championship game on March 24, 2019, Knight made an exceptional pass during a five-on-three power play in the second period, delivering a backwards, between-the-legs no-look pass to Ann-Sophie Bettez for Montreal's second goal of the game. Montreal lost to Calgary 5-2. It was the third time in four years that the two teams had met in the Canadian Women's Hockey League final.

=== Professional Women's Hockey Players Association (PWHPA), 2019–2023 ===
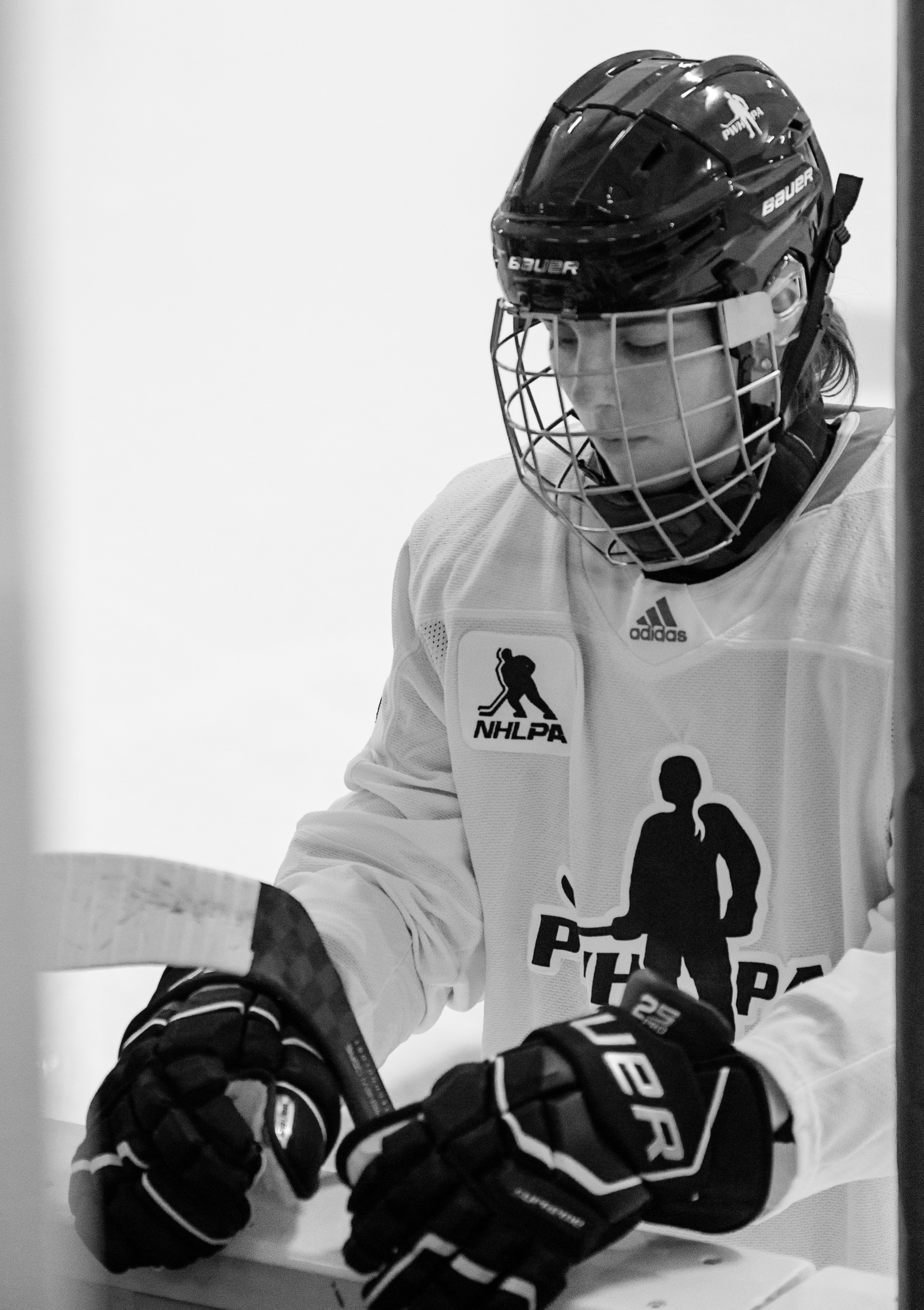
Knight in Toronto for the "Dream Gap Tour", 2019

On May 2, 2019, over 200 women's hockey players announced via coordinated social media posts that they would boycott any professional league in North America for the 2019-20 season. The women behind the #ForTheGame movement included Knight, Marie-Philip Poulin, Amanda Kessel, Sarah Nurse, Lee Stecklein, Rebecca Johnston, Shannon Szabados, Natalie Spooner and Noora Räty. The players stated they were "coming together, not just as individual players, but as one collective voice to help navigate the future" of women's professional hockey.

On May 20, 2019, the players formed the Professional Women's Hockey Players Association (PWHPA) as a non-profit organization. Knight was instrumental, along with her fellow players, in the creation of the PWHPA and served as a staunch advocate for having one professional North American women's hockey league.

The PWHPA organized the "Dream Gap Tour" that toured several cities in Canada and the United States, featuring community involvement events and exhibition games where the top players in the sport competed. PWHPA The first showcase was held in Toronto from September 21 to 22, 2019, with players divided into teams captained by Rebecca Johnston, Brianne Jenner, Liz Knox, and Marie-Philip Poulin.

In May 2022, the PWHPA signed a letter of intent with Billie Jean King Enterprises and the Mark Walter Group to explore launching a professional league. In February 2023, the PWHPA organized a formal union—the PWHLPA—to represent players and negotiate a collective bargaining agreement for the new league, and in June the Mark Walter Group acquired the Premier Hockey Federation. The PWHPA's bargaining committee—consisting of Kendall Coyne Schofield, Brianne Jenner, Hilary Knight, Liz Knox and Sarah Nurse—negotiated with the league's new owners for five months before the CBA was ratified in July 2023. Knight serves on the executive committee for the PWHL players' union.

=== Boston Fleet (PWHL), 2023–2025 ===
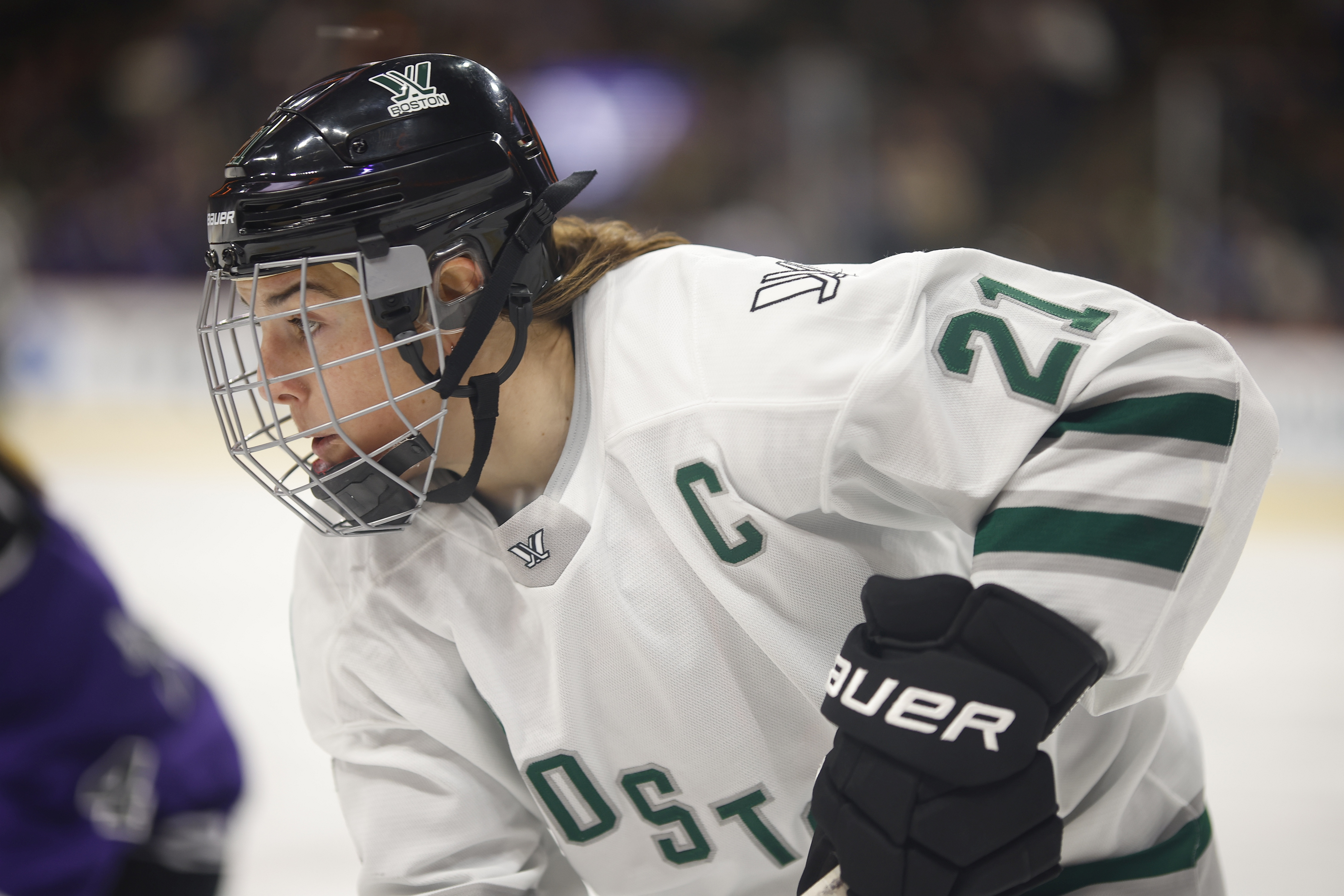
Knight with PWHL Boston in March 2024

Knight served as the inaugural captain of PWHL Boston (later rebranded as Boston Fleet) from the league's founding in 2023 through the 2024-25 season. Knight signed with PWHL Boston on September 7, 2023, as one of the first players in the new league, and was named the team's inaugural captain on January 2, 2024. During the team's first season, Knight struggled with an ankle injury which showed on the stat sheet with six goals and five assists in 24 games, but was critical in building the team's foundation as Boston made a strong playoff run. Knight led the team to the Walter Cup Finals in its first season PWHL, though they ultimately fell to the Minnesota Frost in Game 5 of the championship series. Knight rebounded strongly in the 2024–25 season, demonstrating her elite abilities despite being one of the league's oldest players at age 35. She recorded 15 goals and 14 assists during the regular season, with her 29 points tying Sarah Fillier for the league lead as she claimed the Points Leader Award and was one of three players to be named a finalist for PWHL Forward of the Year.

Knight led PWHL forwards in ice time, averaging nearly 22 minutes per game while playing injury-free after addressing an ankle issue from the previous season. Knight became the first PHWL player to score a hat trick on March 5 during a record-tying four-point performance. She ranked among the season's most productive players in the league with seven multi-point games, placing her in a three-way tie for third in that category, and she was one of four players to achieve a four-point performance during the season.

Knight's time with Boston came to a surprising end when the Fleet left her unprotected during the PWHL expansion process, instead protecting goaltender Aerin Frankel, defender Megan Keller, and forward Alina Müller.

=== Seattle Torrent (PWHL), 2025–2026 ===
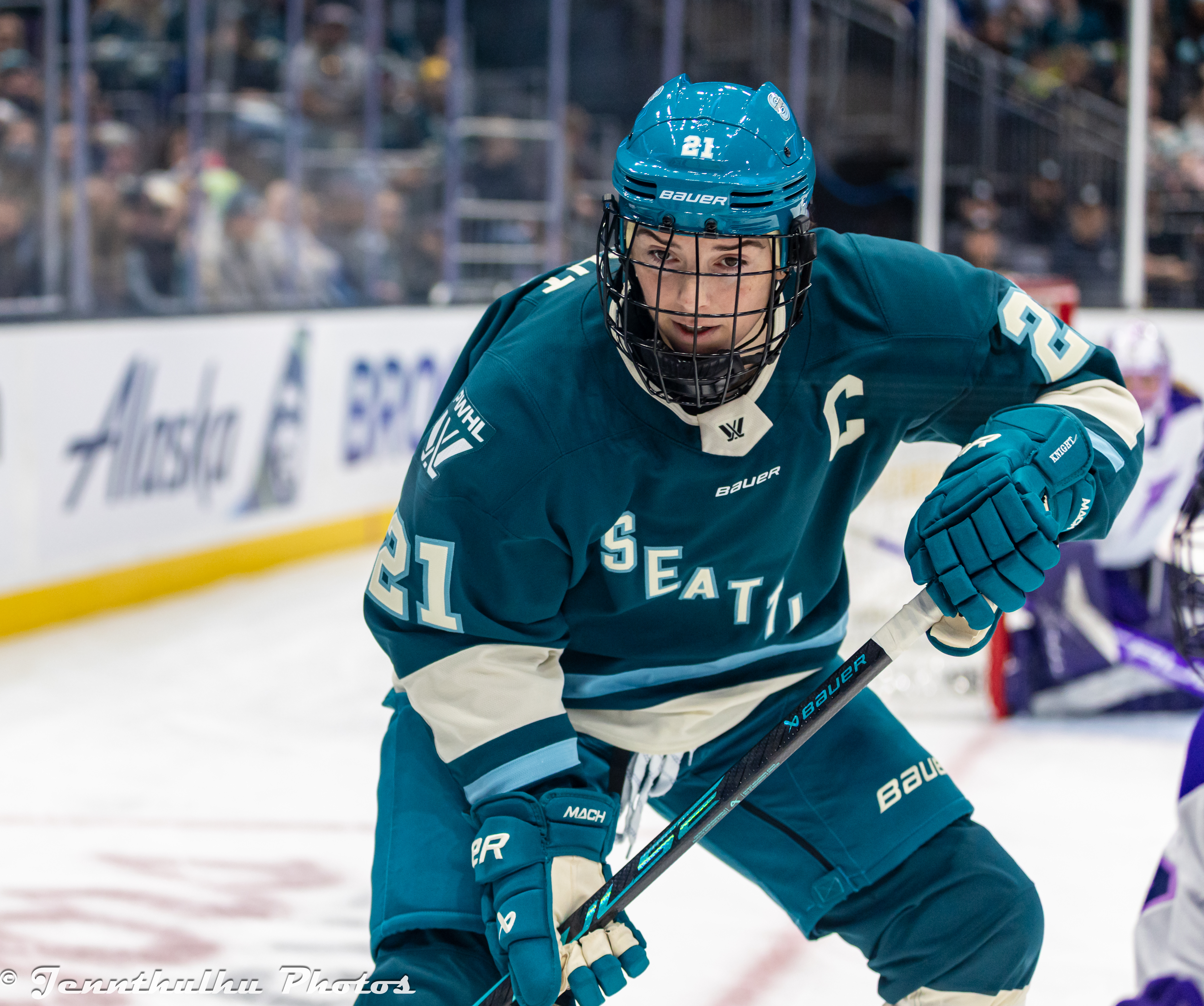
Knight during Seattle Torrent's inaugural home game at Climate Pledge Arena in November 2025

During the league's expansion ahead of the 2025–26 season, Knight signed a one-year contract with the Seattle Torrent on June 4, 2025, becoming the first player to join the new team. On November 14, 2025, Knight was named the franchise's first captain, having previously captained the Boston Fleet during the PWHL's first two seasons.

As captain, Knight made her home debut for the Torrent on November 28, 2025, in front of a record-breaking 16,014 fans at Climate Pledge Arena, which established multiple benchmarks: the largest crowd for a women's hockey game in a US arena, surpassing the previous US professional women's hockey record of 14,288, and the highest-attended primary home venue game in PWHL history. Knight reflected on the significance of the moment, stating "There's something about Seattle that is just so special... A dream come true, pinch me kind of moment.". In the team's second home game and down a goal to the New York Sirens in the third period, Knight assisted and then scored to win 2-1 within the final two minutes of the game. It marked the Torrent's first win of the season. She was named first star of the game with fellow goalscorer Alex Carpenter and goaltender Hannah Murphy earning second and third respectively.

On December 17, 2025, Knight recorded two assists in a 4–1 victory over the Ottawa Charge before 9,389 fans at Climate Pledge Arena, giving her multiple points in consecutive games for the first time with Seattle. Knight, along with linemates Carpenter and Julia Gosling, combined for three goals and seven points in the victory. Through her first four games with Seattle, Knight had accumulated three power play points (1G, 2A), after tallying eight of her 29 points on the power play the previous season with Boston. The top line trio of Gosling, Carpenter, and Knight had scored seven of Seattle's nine goals through the team's first four games. On December 23, 2025, Knight assisted on Gosling's game-winning goal in a 2–1 victory over the Montreal Victoire before 10,276 fans at Climate Pledge Arena. The assist came during a delayed penalty situation early in the third period, as Knight knocked the puck off Poulin's stick and fed Gosling cross-ice for the finish. The goal survived a video review lasting more than six minutes before being confirmed. On January 20, 2026, Knight scored a power-play goal at 9:52 of the first period as Seattle defeated Toronto 6–4, in the highest-scoring game of the PWHL season. The Torrent's six goals set a franchise record and matched the season high for any PWHL team. The victory was part of Seattle's preparation for the upcoming Olympics, as the Torrent fielded six Olympic-bound players in the contest. In February 2026, Knight was placed on long-term injured reserve by the Torrent due to a lower body injury she sustained at the 2026 Winter Olympics. She was reactivated on March 29, and returned to play on March 30 in a 2-0 loss to the Ottawa Charge.

=== Detroit Clutch, 2026–present ===
During the PWHL expansion to 12 teams ahead of the 2026–27 PWHL season, Knight was left unprotected by the Torrent. On June 9, 2026, Knight signed a one-year contract with PWHL Las Vegas after receiving an expansion foundational offer. Knight was the fifth and final player to sign with Las Vegas during phase two of the PWHL 2026 expansion roster distribution process.

On June 16, PWHL Las Vegas traded Knight to PWHL Detroit (Later rebranded as Detroit Clutch) in exchange for their first-round selection in the 2026 PWHL Draft. On June 25, 2026, she signed a two-year contract extension with Detroit through the 2028–29 season. On November 18, 2026, Knight was named captain for the Clutch for their inagural season.

== International play ==
Medal record

Women's ice hockey

Representing the United States

Winter Olympics
Gold medal – first place	2018 Pyeongchang	Team
Gold medal – first place	2026 Milano Cortina	Team
Silver medal – second place	2010 Vancouver	Team
Silver medal – second place	2014 Sochi	Team
Silver medal – second place	2022 Beijing	Team

World Championships
Gold medal – first place	2008 China	
Gold medal – first place	2009 Finland	
Gold medal – first place	2011 Switzerland	
Gold medal – first place	2013 Canada	
Gold medal – first place	2015 Sweden	
Gold medal – first place	2016 Canada	
Gold medal – first place	2017 United States	
Gold medal – first place	2019 Finland	
Gold medal – first place	2023 Canada	
Gold medal – first place	2025 Czechia	
Gold medal – first place	2026 Denmark	
Silver medal – second place	2012 United States	
Silver medal – second place	2007 Canada	
Silver medal – second place	2021 Canada	
Silver medal – second place	2022 Denmark	
Silver medal – second place	2024 United States	

Knight started playing for the United States national team as a teenager. In November 2006, she was the youngest player on the team at 2006 4 Nations Cup at 17 years old. She was also the youngest player on the United States squad competing at the 2007 IIHF World Women's Championship and helped the team win silver at the tournament. The same year, she also played for the under-22 national team.

Knight became a key contributor to the United States' international success over the following years. At the 2011 IIHF Women's World Championship, she scored the game-winning goal at 7:48 of overtime as the United States defeated Canada 3–2 to capture its third consecutive world title.

During the first game of the 2011 IIHF 12 Nations Tournament, Knight scored a hat trick in a 12–0 victory over Russia. In the opening match of the 2012 IIHF Women's World Championship, Knight scored two goals in a 9–2 win over Canada.

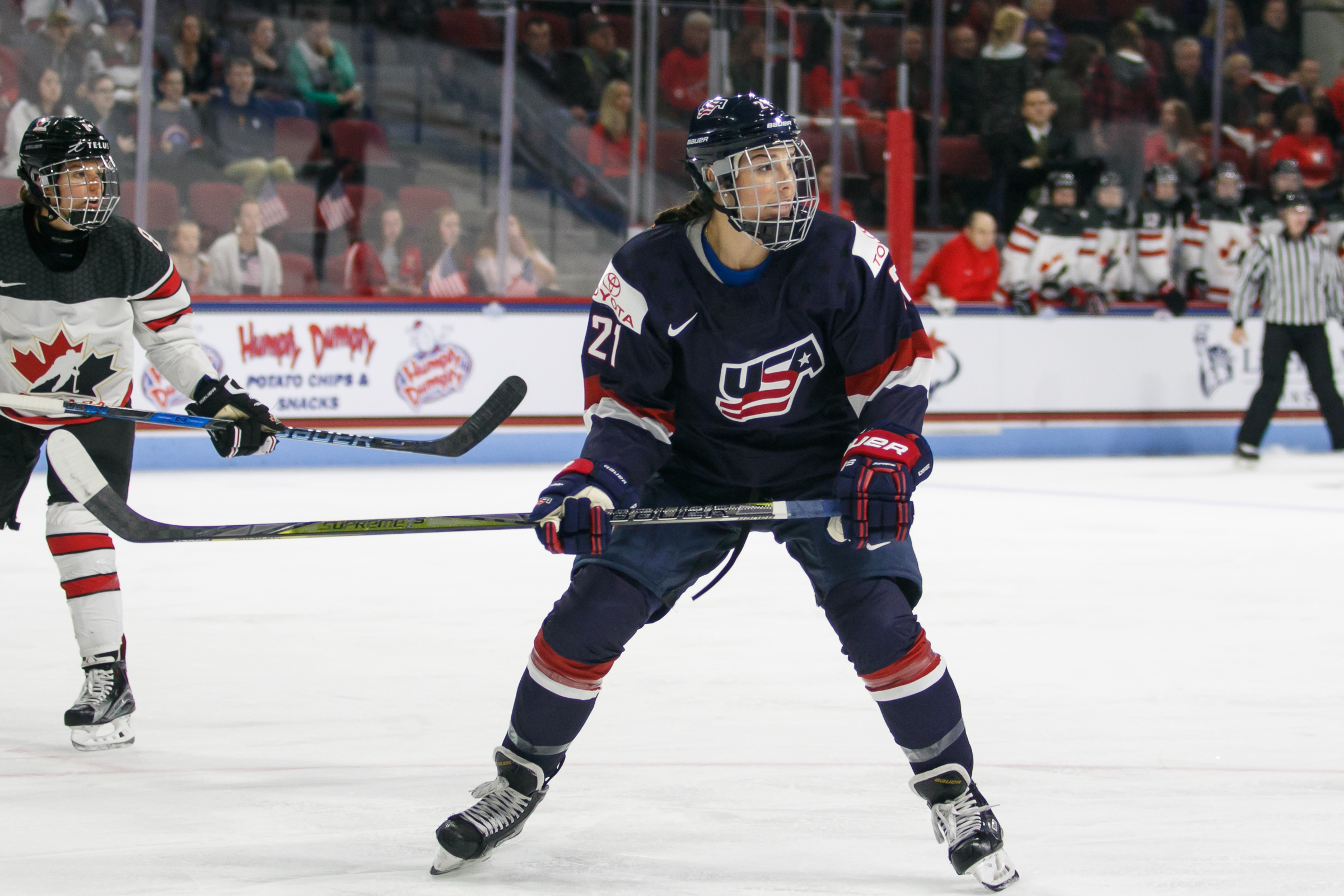
Hilary Knight playing for the United States in October 2017

Knight represented the United States at the 2023 IIHF Women's World Championship, where she recorded eight goals and four assists in seven games. During the championship game she recorded a hat trick to help lead the team to a gold medal. With 12 points during the tournament, she became the first player in IIHF World Women's Championship history to surpass 100 career points. The win also gave Knight nine career gold medals, tying Danielle Goyette for most all time. It was also her 13th career medal, tying Hayley Wickenheiser for the most medals all time.

At the 2026 IIHF Women's World Championship, Knight became the oldest woman to score a hat trick at any IIHF World Championship, at age 37 in a win over Czechia. On November 16, Knight scored 2 goals as the United States defeated Canada 6–2 to win the gold medal, her eleventh in the Women's World Championship.

=== Olympics ===
Knight has competed in five Winter Olympics – the 2010 Winter Olympics in Vancouver, the 2014 Winter Olympics in Sochi, the 2018 Winter Olympics in Pyeongchang, the 2022 Winter Olympics in Beijing, and the 2026 Winter Olympics in Milan. Knight is the all-time leading Olympic goal scorer in US hockey history (15 goals), and all-time Olympic points leader in US hockey history (33 points).

==== 2010 Vancouver ====
Knight took a year (2009–2010) off from studying at the University of Wisconsin to join United States for the Olympics. At 20 years and 217 days of age, she was the youngest member of either the men's or women's US Olympic teams. She recorded seven assists and one goal, with the lone goal coming against Finland. She finished the tournament with eight points and earned a silver medal.

==== 2014 Sochi ====
Knight played a prominent role in the 2014 tournament, tied for the team lead in points with six and scoring the team's first goal of the Olympics. She finished with three goals and three assists across the tournament and was named to the Media All-Star team in recognition of her outstanding performance. The United States fell to Canada in the gold medal game and earned a silver medal, marking Knight's second consecutive Olympic silver.

==== 2018 Pyeongchang ====
The 2018 Olympics proved to be a breakthrough for Knight and the United States. In a highly anticipated gold medal rematch against Canada, Knight gave the United States a 1–0 lead with a power-play goal late in the first period by redirecting a shot from Sidney Morin. Knight finished the tournament with two goals and one assist as the United States defeated Canada 3–2 in a shootout, ending a 20-year gold medal drought and capturing the first Olympic gold for American women's hockey since the inaugural tournament at 1998 Olympics in Nagano. It was Knight's first Olympic gold medal after two previous silver medal finishes.

==== 2022 Beijing ====
On January 2, 2022, Knight was named to the United States' roster for the 2022 Winter Olympics. She became the fourth American woman in USA Hockey history to be named to four Olympic teams alongside Jenny Potter, Angela Ruggiero, and Julie Chu.

Knight led the team in scoring with six goals and three assists for nine points in seven games, setting personal highs for goals and points in an Olympic tournament. During the tournament, Knight set a new US women's record by playing in her 22nd Olympic game and moved into second place for most career Olympic goals among American women with 12.

In the gold medal game against Canada, Knight scored a shorthanded goal in the second period to cut Canada's lead to 3–1, but the United States fell 3–2, ending their bid to defend their Olympic title. Knight earned her third Olympic silver medal and subsequently earned the Bob Allen Women's Player of the Year Award.

==== 2026 Milano Cortina ====
In May 2025, Knight announced that the 2026 Winter Olympics would be her fifth and final Olympic Games. She played in all four games of the 2025 Rivalry Series against Canada, recording a hat trick in a 6–1 victory in game two, scoring three goals including an empty-net goal. In the series finale, she scored twice in the third period, as the United States defeated Canada 4–1 to complete the first sweep in Rivalry Series history. She was named to the United States' roster for the 2026 Olympics, becoming the first American hockey player to participate in five Olympic Games.

With Knight as captain, the US opened the Olympic tournament with a 5–1 victory over Czechia. Knight scored her 13th career Olympic goal. In their second game, Knight scored her 14th career Olympic goal and tied the US record for most career Olympic goals in a 5–0 shutout victory over Finland. Her goal tied the record previously shared by Natalie Darwitz and Katie King. After the game, Knight reflected on the team's young talent, calling the 2026 Olympic team "electric" and expressing her desire to inspire the next generation of hockey players.

In the gold medal game against Canada, Knight scored a game-tying goal — tipping in a shot from Laila Edwards with two minutes remaining after being down 1–0 for the majority of the game. The US won the gold medal in overtime. Knight broke Team USA records (for both women and men) for goals (15) and points (33) and most Olympic appearances in hockey (five Olympic tournaments). She also became the all-time leading Olympic goal scorer. She was chosen a flag bearer during the 2026 Winter Olympics closing ceremony, making her the third ice hockey player to do so, following Cammi Granato and Julie Chu.

== In popular culture ==
Knight is widely known as the face of women's hockey in the United States, a title she acknowledges as not taking lightly, stating she hopes to be remembered for both her on-ice legacy and her work off the ice. In 2014, she was featured in ESPN The Magazine's The Body Issue, posing in her hockey skates. Knight discussed the experience, stating she had initially been self-conscious about her athletic build and muscular arms, but the opportunity helped her embrace body confidence and femininity as a strong female athlete.

External videos
- Ellen Honors the Gold Medal-Winning US Women's Hockey Team retrieved November 29, 2025

After winning gold at the 2018 Olympics, Knight traveled across the country on a media tour, making appearances on shows like The Ellen DeGeneres Show and The Tonight Show with Jimmy Fallon. On March 3, 2018, she made a guest appearance on the Weekend Update segment of Saturday Night Live. In 2019, Knight was featured in an episode of "Change of Pace", a TV Mini Series by Red Bull about female athletes who want to make a positive impact on the future of women's sports.

In 2019, Knight worked as a guest analyst for NBC during the NHL playoffs. Knight joined ESPN's broadcast team in 2021, where she serves as an analyst for select NHL season games. She was among several analysts hired by ESPN, joining Chris Chelios, Ray Ferraro, Brian Boucher, Ryan Callahan, Cassie Campbell-Pascall, Rick DiPietro, A.J. Mleczko, and Kevin Weekes as part of the network's hockey coverage team.

Knight has been the subject of many documentaries, interviews and media profiles over the course of her career, and has been featured by Team USA and ESPN in documentaries. In 2026, she was featured in The Inaugural Season of the PWHL, a documentary produced by Hello Sunshine and Reese Witherspoon as part of The Rise documentary series chronicling the growth of women's sports. The film, directed by Patty Ivins Specht follows the historic inaugural 2024 season of the PWHL and premiered on Peacock.

In 2011, the city of Sun Valley, Idaho declared May 19, 2011 Hilary Knight Day.

== Endorsements and sponsorships ==
Knight has secured sponsorship deals with major brands including Nike and Red Bull, two of her biggest sponsors, and uses Bauer Hockey as the supplier for her skates, helmet, gloves and stick. She has also had endorsement partnerships with Visa, GoPro, and Chipotle. She is also sponsored by EA Sports and beginning in 2022 is featured as a playable player in its NHL video game.

In September 2016, Knight partnered with Bauer Hockey and joined the company's roster of elite athletes, agreeing to exclusively wear Bauer equipment, provide insight to future product development, and be featured in Bauer advertising campaigns. In October 2017, Bauer launched a campaign titled "The Women's Movement Never Stops" featuring Knight and Marie-Philip Poulin to raise awareness for women's hockey and inspire young girls to try the sport.

Knight has acknowledged the evolution of her endorsement opportunities, recalling early struggles as a professional athlete when she had to give lessons for financial viability and eat peanut butter and jelly sandwiches while training for the Olympics. As her profile grew, brands became eager to partner with her, and Knight became selective about which sponsorships to accept. She has stated that she has pursued many partnerships not only for herself but because she understood the value of the visibility those companies or brands would provide to the sport of hockey.

== Personal life ==
Knight is a member of the queer community. For much of her career, she struggled with her identity and was hesitant to come out publicly, citing fear and a belief that it wasn't necessarily her responsibility. However, she ultimately decided to share her story to provide visibility for underrepresented communities. Knight and USA speed skater Brittany Bowe began dating in December 2022. The two athletes first met and got to know each other at the 2022 Winter Olympics in Beijing, where they would take masked evening walks together during the strict COVID-19 protocols—socially distanced encounters that Knight later described as "fully masked" and "not romantic at all, but cute." Knight credits her relationship with Bowe as helping her find the strength to eventually come out publicly. In 2024, the couple purchased a home together, where they enjoy training together, working in their backyard, and playing pickleball. Knight has noted that both being elite athletes helps them understand what the other may need, whether that's support or space. During the 2026 Winter Olympics, Knight and Bowe became engaged.

In addition to her playing career, Knight has had various leadership roles within women's hockey. After the founding of the Professional Women's Hockey League (PWHL) in 2023, she was named to the executive committee of the league's labor union, the PWHL Players Association; she was voted the union's player representative for PWHL Boston.

Hilary grew up in a skiing family. Her cousin is a three-time Olympic alpine skier Chip Knight.

== Career statistics ==
=== Regular season and playoffs ===
			Regular season					Playoffs
Season	Team	League	GP	G	A	Pts	PIM	GP	G	A	Pts	PIM
2007–08	University of Wisconsin	WCHA	36	19	16	35	24	5	1	2	3	4
2008–09	University of Wisconsin	WCHA	34	39	28	67	18	5	6	10	16	6
2010–11	University of Wisconsin	WCHA	34	42	27	69	10	7	5	7	12	2
2011–12	University of Wisconsin	WCHA	34	28	26	54	22	6	3	3	6	0
2012–13	Boston Blades	CWHL	24	17	15	32	10	4	1	4	5	0
2013–14	Boston Blades	CWHL	4	4	4	8	0	4	5	1	6	0
2014–15	Boston Blades	CWHL	13	8	14	22	4	3	4	3	7	6
2015–16	Boston Pride	NWHL	17	15	18	33	8	4	7	2	9	0
2016–17	Boston Pride	NWHL	10	8	7	15	4	2	3	2	5	2
2017–18	Les Canadiennes de Montréal	CWHL	1	0	0	0	2	2	0	0	0	0
2018–19	Les Canadiennes de Montréal	CWHL	23	9	8	17	4	4	4	4	8	0
2020–21	Team Adidas	PWHPA	6	3	3	6	6	—	—	—	—	—
2022–23	Team Sonnet	PWHPA	18	4	6	10	0	—	—	—	—	—
2023–24	PWHL Boston	PWHL	24	6	5	11	6	8	0	0	0	6
2024–25	Boston Fleet	PWHL	30	15	14	29	12	—	—	—	—	—
2025–26	Seattle Torrent	PWHL	22	5	9	14	8	—	—	—	—	—
NWHL totals			27	23	25	48	12	6	10	4	14	2
CWHL totals			65	38	41	79	20	17	14	12	26	6
PHWPA totals			24	7	9	16	6	—	—	—	—	—
PWHL totals			76	26	28	54	26	8	0	0	0	6

=== International ===
Year	Team	Event	Result	GP	G	A	Pts	PIM
2007	United States	WC	2nd place, silver medalist(s)	5	2	2	4	0
2008	United States	WC	1st place, gold medalist(s)	5	0	1	1	0
2009	United States	WC	1st place, gold medalist(s)	5	7	2	9	0
2010	United States	OG	2nd place, silver medalist(s)	5	1	7	8	0
2011	United States	WC	1st place, gold medalist(s)	5	5	9	14	0
2012	United States	WC	2nd place, silver medalist(s)	5	5	2	7	0
2013	United States	WC	1st place, gold medalist(s)	5	1	1	2	0
2014	United States	OG	2nd place, silver medalist(s)	5	3	3	6	6
2015	United States	WC	1st place, gold medalist(s)	5	7	5	12	0
2016	United States	WC	1st place, gold medalist(s)	5	7	2	9	0
2017	United States	WC	1st place, gold medalist(s)	5	4	5	9	0
2018	United States	OG	1st place, gold medalist(s)	5	2	1	3	4
2019	United States	WC	1st place, gold medalist(s)	7	7	4	11	4
2021	United States	WC	2nd place, silver medalist(s)	7	4	2	6	2
2022	United States	OG	2nd place, silver medalist(s)	7	6	4	10	0
2022	United States	WC	2nd place, silver medalist(s)	7	6	3	9	0
2023	United States	WC	1st place, gold medalist(s)	7	8	4	12	6
2024	United States	WC	2nd place, silver medalist(s)	7	4	6	10	0
2025	United States	WC	1st place, gold medalist(s)	7	2	7	9	0
2026	United States	OG	1st place, gold medalist(s)	7	2	3	5	0
Senior totals				116	81	71	152	22

=== Career highs ===
- Most goals in one game: 5; vs. Quinnipiac (September 27, 2008)
- Most assists in one game: 5; vs. St. Cloud State (February 11, 2012)
- Most points in one game: 6; vs. St. Cloud State (February 11, 2012)
- Longest point-scoring streak: 20 consecutive games; (December 10, 2010, to February 26, 2011)
- Career multi-point games: 63

== Awards and honors ==
=== IIHF ===
- 2023 IIHF Female Player of the Year, the inaugural winner
- 2019 IIHF World Women's Championship Tournament scoring leader and All-star team
- 2016 IIHF World Women’s Championship Tournament MVP, scoring leader, Best Forward, and All-star team
- 2015 IIHF World Women's Championship Tournament MVP, scoring leader, Best Forward, and All-star team
- 2011 IIHF World Women's Championship Tournament scoring leader and All-star team

=== NCAA ===
- 2009 RBK Hockey/AHCA Division I first-team All-American
- 2009 Patty Kazmaier Memorial Award top 10 finalist
- 2009 WCHA Player of the Year
- 2009 Frozen Four All-Tournament team
- 2011 Frozen Four All-Tournament team
- 2011 NCAA Tournament MVP
- 2008 WCHA All-Rookie Team
- WCHA Offensive Player of the Week (Week of Oct.8, 2008)
- WCHA Offensive Player of the Week (Week of November 19, 2008)
- WCHA Offensive Player of the Week (Week of October 5, 2010)
- 2008–09 WCHA Preseason Rookie of the Year
- WCHA Rookie of the Week honors (Week of January 7, 2009)
- WCHA Rookie of the Week honors (Week of February 4, 2009)
- 2010 WCHA Pre-Season Player of the Year
- WCHA Offensive Player of the Week (Week of January 5, 2011)
- WCHA Offensive Player of the Week (Week of January 19, 2011)
- 2011 Patty Kazmaier Award Nominee
- 2011 First Team All-America selection
- WCHA Player of the Week (Week of December 14, 2011)

=== CWHL ===
- 2013 CWHL Most Outstanding Player Award

=== NWHL ===
- 2015–16 NWHL regular season scoring champion

=== PWHL ===
- 2024–25 PWHL Points Leader
- 2024–25 First All-Star Team

=== USA Hockey ===
- Media All-Star team, 2011 IIHF Women's World Championship
- US Olympic Committee's athlete-of-the-month for April 2011
- US player-of-the-game, November 9, 2011, vs. Sweden, 2011 4 Nations Cup
- 2012 Jeff Sauer Award
- 2014, 2022, 2025 Bob Allen Women's Player of the Year Award
- Team USA captain 2023–present
- 2026 US Olympic team flag bearer at the closing ceremonies

=== Other ===
- The city of Sun Valley, Idaho declared May 19, 2011 as Hilary Knight Day.

Sporting positions
Preceded by Position created	Boston Fleet captain 2023–2025	Succeeded by Megan Keller
Preceded by Position created	Seattle Torrent captain 2025–present	Incumbent
