= IIHF Female Player of the Year =

International ice hockey award

- Sport: Ice hockey
- Awarded for: Annually to the player who "best exemplifies exceptional skill, determination, team success, and sporting character on and off the ice during the preceding season."

History
- First award: 2023
- First winner: Hilary Knight
- Most recent: Caroline Harvey (2026)

The IIHF Female Player of the Year award is given out annually by the International Ice Hockey Federation (IIHF), in recognition of the ice hockey player who "best exemplifies exceptional skill, determination, team success, and sporting character on and off the ice during the preceding season." It is selected by a panel of media and IIHF representatives drawn from among the member states of the International Ice Hockey Federation.

To be eligible, a player must have competed in at least one of three IIHF tournaments (the Winter Olympics, IIHF World Women's Championship, or IIHF World Women's U18 Championship) as well as in a national domestic league "of the highest caliber for that country," with "the combined performances of which were deemed superior to all other players."

It was first awarded in 2023, along with its counterpart, the IIHF Male Player of the Year. Hilary Knight, of the United States national team and the PWHPA's Team Sonnet, was the inaugural recipient.

== Winners ==
Year	Winner	National team	Club	Ref
2023	Hilary Knight	United States	Team Sonnet (PWHPA)	
2024	Natalie Spooner	Canada	PWHL Toronto (PWHL)	
2025	Marie-Philip Poulin	Canada	Montreal Victoire (PWHL)	
2026	Caroline Harvey	United States	Wisconsin Badgers (NCAA)	

== See also ==
- IIHF Male Player of the Year
