= Professional Women's Hockey League Players Association =

Canadian labour union

- Abbreviation: PWHLPA
- Formation: 2023
- Headquarters: Toronto, Ontario
- Location(s): Canada; United States
- Executive Committee: Laura Stacey; Lee Stecklein; Savannah Harmon; Hayleigh Cudmore
- Executive Director: Malaika Underwood
- Player representatives: One per team (8 in 2025–26)
- Website: www.pwhlpa.com

The Professional Women's Hockey League Players Association (PWHLPA) is the labor union for the group of professional hockey players under contract with member teams of the Professional Women's Hockey League (PWHL). The Association serves as PWHL players' exclusive collective bargaining agent. Leadership consists of an executive committee and player representatives from each of the eight PWHL teams; Malaika Underwood serves as the executive director.

In July 2023, the PWHLPA and the PWHL agreed on an eight-year collective bargaining agreement, which is in force from 2023 to 2031.

== History ==
=== PWHPA ===
Following the dissolution of the Canadian Women's Hockey League (CWHL) in 2019, over 200 prominent women's players, including Canadian and American national team players, founded the Professional Women's Hockey Players Association (PWHPA) to advocate for and organize towards a unified and stable professional women's hockey league. Although the National Women's Hockey League (NWHL) had been founded as the first truly professional women's league in 2015, PWHPA players vowed to boycott it. The NWHL was blamed in part for the collapse of the CWHL, and PWHPA players also saw the NWHL as unstable—for example, it had a history of pay cuts and minimum salaries reportedly as low as $2,000. As such, the PWHPA intended to instead pursue the establishment of a new league with what they considered a sustainable business model.

The PWHPA spent the next several years courting corporate, media, and National Hockey League (NHL) partnerships, organizing a "Dream Gap" tour to generate support for its goal. For its part, the NHL proved unwilling to put its support fully behind the Premier Hockey Federation (PHF)—the rebranded NWHL—or establishing a new women's league with the PWHPA, and it encouraged the sides to discuss a merger.

In 2022, the PWHPA entered a partnership with Mark Walter and Billie Jean King with the intent to launch their new professional league.

=== The PWHL ===
In February 2023, the PWHPA organized a formal union—the PWHLPA—to represent players and negotiate a collective bargaining agreement (CBA) for the new league. On June 29, it was announced that the PWHPA's two business partners, under the names of Mark Walter Group and BJK Enterprises, had purchased the PHF and its intellectual properties with the intent of effectively winding it down and merging it with the new venture. The partners then announced the foundation of the Professional Women's Hockey League (PWHL), with the intent to begin play in January 2024. On July 2, the PWHLPA formally ratified the new CBA, set to last for eight years, expiring in the summer of 2031.

The CBA establishes that each PWHL team must sign at least six players to a minimum salary of $80,000, and no more than nine players to a league minimum salary of $35,000, with teams instructed to achieve an average salary of $55,000; the base and average salaries are slated to increase 3% per season through the end of the agreement. The CBA further outlines performance and team bonuses, including a $63,250 bonus for the championship-winning team, and other financial incentives, including housing stipends and retirement plans. The agreement also includes health and disability insurance and workers' compensation, as well as guarantees around medical examinations and assistance and player safety.

On August 29, the union hired Brian Burke as its executive director. In the fall of 2023, it was revealed that the union's executive committee consisted of PWHL players Brianne Jenner, Sarah Nurse, Hilary Knight, and Kendall Coyne Schofield, and former PWHPA board member and CWHL Players Association chair Liz Knox. In December 2023, less than two weeks before the start of the inaugural PWHL season, each team selected a player representative to serve on the union's board of directors.

=== AFL-CIO ===
On March 5, 2026, the PWHLPA joined the AFL-CIO. The players association became the 65th affiliate of the United States' largest labor federation, and the 10th professional sports union on the AFL-CIO Sports Council.

== Leadership ==
=== Executive Committee ===
As of the 2025–26 season:

- Laura Stacey, President
- Lee Stecklein, Vice President
- Savannah Harmon, Treasurer
- Hayleigh Cudmore, Secretary

=== Player representatives ===
Yearly player representatives per team
Year	Boston	Minnesota	Montreal	New York	Ottawa	Seattle	Toronto	Vancouver
2023–24	Hilary Knight	Lee Stecklein	Laura Stacey	Micah Zandee-Hart	Jincy Roese	—N/a	Natalie Spooner	—N/a
2024–25	Amanda Pelkey	Lee Stecklein	Laura Stacey	Micah Zandee-Hart	Jincy Roese	—N/a	Natalie Spooner	—N/a
2025–26	Jill Saulnier	Britta Curl-Salemme	Maureen Murphy	Micah Zandee-Hart	Rebecca Leslie	Jessie Eldridge	Jesse Compher	Emma Greco

=== Executive Directors ===
- Brian Burke, 2023–2025
- Malaika Underwood, 2025–present
