= 2020–21 PWHPA season =

- League: Professional Women's Hockey Players Association
- Sport: Ice hockey
- Duration: September 2020 – May 2021

Secret Cup
- USA Secret Cup champions: Team Adidas (Minnesota)
- Canadian Secret Cup champions: Team Bauer (Montreal)

PWHPA seasons
- 2019–20 2021–22

The 2020–21 PWHPA season was the second season organized by the Professional Women's Hockey Players Association (PWHPA).

Formed after the collapse of the Canadian Women's Hockey League (CWHL) in 2019, the PWHPA consists of over 150 women's ice hockey players boycotting the National Women's Hockey League (NWHL) and working towards the establishment of a new, unified women's professional league. For the 2020–21 season, the PWHPA organized into five different training hubs, each of which fielded a roster that competing in exhibition games across North America and in the Dream Gap Tour tournament.

== Business ==
On September 2, 2020, the PWHPA released a statement condemning police brutality and racial injustice. The same day, Liz Knox resigned from the PWHPA board in order to cede her seat to Sarah Nurse, one of the few Black players in the organization.

In August 2020, the PWHPA partnered with Elites Optimization Services to help players find individual sponsorships. After sponsoring a showcase the previous season, deodorant brand Secret agreed to a $1 million sponsorship deal with the PWHPA on October 22, 2020, marking the largest corporate commitment in North American women's hockey history. The sponsorship deal included prize money for the Dream Gap Tour, which was planned to start in early 2021. The PWHPA also added partnerships with Noble Estates Wines & Spirits, Canadian Tire, and Sportlogiq.

The PWHPA decided to reduce its number of training hubs from eight to five, maintaining hubs in Montreal, Toronto, Calgary, New Hampshire and Minnesota.

On February 23, 2021, the PWHPA announced the February 28 game of the 2021 Dream Gap Tour, played at Madison Square Garden, would be aired live on the NHL Network in the United States and Sportsnet in Canada.

== Teams ==
Of the five regional hubs, three were in Canada in Montréal, Toronto, and Calgary; two were in the United States in New Hampshire and Minnesota. PWHPA players competed in try-outs for 25 spots on the official rosters for each hub. In late October, the PWHPA announced the full rosters for each hub as well as coaching staffs. Players who did not make the rosters continued to be members of the PWHPA as independents.

In the 2019–20 season, teams were formed throughout the season and named after players acting as captains for each series. For this season, the regional hubs made sponsorship agreements for team names. The Toronto hub made a sponsorship deal with insurance company Sonnet and was branded as Team Sonnet, with the hub's jerseys featuring turquoise and white. The Calgary hub was branded Team Scotiabank, with red and white jerseys, in a partnership with Scotiabank that includes a mentorship program for young female players. On February 25, 2021, before the tour's first games, the Minnesota and New Hampshire-based teams announced their sponsored names as Team Adidas and Team WSF (Women's Sports Foundation), respectively. The Montréal team was announced as Team Bauer on March 3.

Team	Region	Head coach
Team Adidas	Minnesota	Matt Leitner
Team Bauer	Montréal	Stephanie Poirier; Danièle Sauvageau; Phillippe Trahan
Team Scotiabank	Calgary	Dean Seymour
Team Sonnet	Toronto	Laura McIntosh
Team WSF	New Hampshire	Bill Flanagan

== Exhibition games ==
The first exhibition games of the season took place in late September, as PWHPA teams faced off against teams from the United States Premier Hockey League (USPHL). One week after tryouts, the New Hampshire team faced the Islanders Hockey Club's National Collegiate Development Conference (NCDC) team and the Boston Junior Bruins' NCDC team, losing to both 5–0 and 5–1, respectively. The Minnesota PWHPA team faced the USPHL's Premier Division team, the Minnesota Mullets, on September 19 and 20, winning both games by scores of 8–1 and 9–3.

A PWHPA All-Star team of 24 players from the Minnesota and New Hampshire hubs participated in six games at the USPHL's Hub City Tampa from January 7 to 15, 2021. The USPHL teams in Hub City Tampa were from the organization's top-level NCDC and second-level Premier Division. The PWHPA team earned a 2–3–1 record with wins over the Tampa Bay Juniors' Premier team and the Boston Junior Bruins' NCDC team. The PWHPA All-Star team played another five games against USPHL NCDC and Premier teams in Tampa from February 10 to 17, going 1–4 with a win over the Islanders Hockey Club's Premier team.

== Dream Gap Tour ==
The 2021 Dream Gap Tour, named after the gap in between professional men's and women's hockey opportunities, consisted of matches between the five regional hubs with the entire tour sponsored by deodorant brand Secret. In a change from the previous season, the league planned to have the season culminate in the Secret Cup championship. Due to the COVID-19 pandemic, the season was ultimately split up, with the two American-based teams, Adidas and WSF, playing games in New York, Chicago, and St. Louis, and the three Canadian-based teams, Bauer, Scotiabank, and Sonnet, playing games in Calgary. Teams were awarded 2 points for a regulation win, 1.5 points for an overtime win, 1 point for a shootout win, 0.5 points for an overtime or shootout loss, and zero points for a regulation loss. In addition, one team point could be earned by a player scoring a hat-trick or short-handed goal, a goaltender earning a shutout, or team scoring five or more goals in the same game.

The first showcase took place in the New York City metropolitan area at Protec Ponds Training Center in Somerset, New Jersey, on February 27, and Madison Square Garden on February 28, in partnership with the New York Rangers of the National Hockey League (NHL), and JPMorgan Chase as the presenting sponsor. The Chicago Blackhawks partnered with the PWHPA for a second year, adding Dream Gap Tour stops to the Blackhawks' home arena, the United Center, on March 6 and their practice facility, Fifth Third Arena, on March 7. The third showcase was announced for St. Louis, Missouri, partnering with the St. Louis Blues on April 11 and 12; this showcase was postponed to May 16 and 17 due to outbreaks of COVID-19. The three Canadian teams were scheduled to play a round-robin tournament in Calgary in partnership with the Calgary Flames from May 24 through 30 to determine the Canadian tour champion. The association also continued its partnership with the NHL's Toronto Maple Leafs; a previously planned Toronto leg of the Dream Gap Tour never materialized due to pandemic-related public health measures in Ontario.

=== Schedule and results ===
Showcase	Arena	Date	Team	Score	Team	Notes
New York City	Protec Ponds Training Center	February 27	Team WSF	2–5	Team Adidas	Team Adidas earned an additional team point for scoring five or more goals.
New York City	Madison Square Garden	February 28	Team WSF	4–3	Team Adidas	No additional team points were earned.
Chicago	United Center	March 6	Team Adidas	4–1	Team WSF	No additional team points were earned.
Chicago	Fifth Third Arena	March 7	Team Adidas	6–2	Team WSF	Team Adidas earned an additional team point for scoring five or more goals.
St. Louis	Centene Community Ice Center	~~April 11~~ (Note: Original schedule postponed due to positive cases of COVID-19 before showcase.); May 16	Team Adidas	3–1	Team WSF	Team Adidas earned an additional team point for a short-handed goal scored by Dani Cameranesi.
St. Louis	Enterprise Center	~~April 12~~; May 17	Team Adidas	4–2	Team WSF	No additional team points were earned. Team Adidas was crowned US Secret Cup champions.
Calgary	Seven Chiefs Sportsplex	May 24	Team Sonnet	2–3	Team Bauer	Team Bauer earned an additional team point for a short-handed goal scored by Marie-Philip Poulin.
Calgary	Seven Chiefs Sportsplex	May 25	Team Bauer	6–1	Team Scotiabank	Team Bauer earned an additional team point for scoring five or more goals.
Calgary	Seven Chiefs Sportsplex	May 26	Team Scotiabank	3–8	Team Sonnet	Team Sonnet earned two additional team points for scoring five or more goals and a hat-trick by Brittany Howard.
Calgary	Seven Chiefs Sportsplex	May 27	Team Bauer	3–4	Team Sonnet	Team Bauer earned an additional team point for a short-handed goal scored by Laura Stacey.
Calgary	Scotiabank Saddledome	May 28	Team Scotiabank	3–4	Team Bauer	No additional team points were earned.
Calgary	Scotiabank Saddledome	May 29	Team Sonnet	2–3	Team Scotiabank	No additional team points were earned.
Calgary	Scotiabank Saddledome	May 30	Team Sonnet	2–4	Team Bauer	Canadian championship game. Team Bauer was crowned Canadian Secret Cup champions.

== See also ==
- 2020–21 NWHL season
