= Marie-Philip Poulin =

Canadian ice hockey player (born 1991)

CQ Marie-Philip Poulin
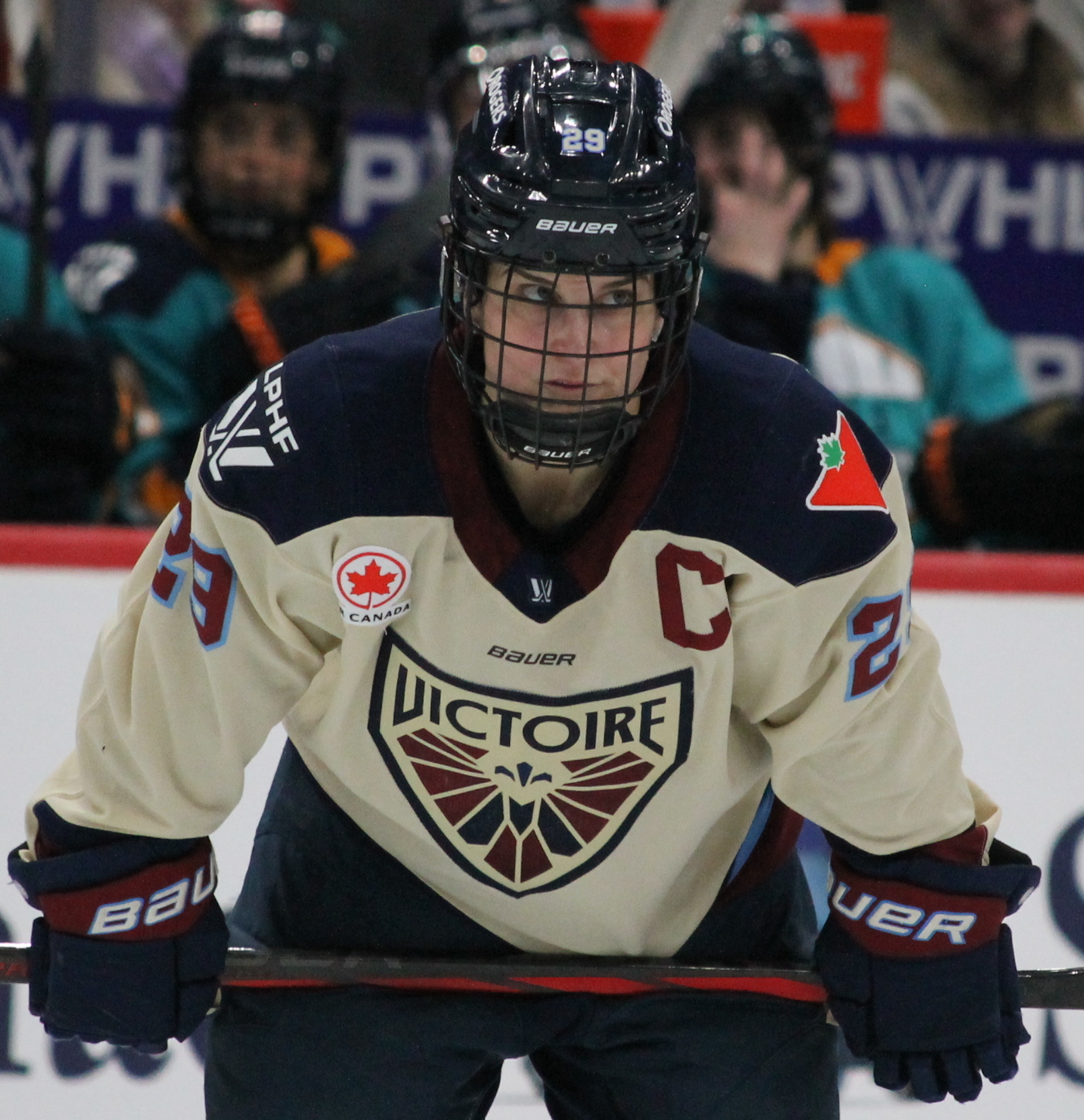
- Poulin with the Montreal Victoire in 2026
- Born: March 28, 1991 (age 35) Quebec City, Quebec, Canada
- Height: 5 ft 6 in (168 cm)
- Weight: 160 lb (73 kg; 11 st 6 lb)
- Position: Centre
- Shoots: Left
- PWHL team Former teams: Montreal Victoire: PWHPA Montréal; Les Canadiennes de Montreal; Dawson College Blues; Boston University Terriers
- National team: Canada
- Playing career: 2008–present
Medal record
Olympic Games
| Gold medal – first place | 2010 Vancouver | Team |
| Gold medal – first place | 2014 Sochi | Team |
| Gold medal – first place | 2022 Beijing | Team |
| Silver medal – second place | 2018 Pyeongchang | Team |
| Silver medal – second place | 2026 Milano Cortina | Team |
World Championships
| Gold medal – first place | 2012 United States |
| Gold medal – first place | 2021 Canada |
| Gold medal – first place | 2022 Denmark |
| Gold medal – first place | 2024 United States |
| Silver medal – second place | 2009 Finland |
| Silver medal – second place | 2011 Switzerland |
| Silver medal – second place | 2013 Canada |
| Silver medal – second place | 2015 Sweden |
| Silver medal – second place | 2016 Canada |
| Silver medal – second place | 2017 United States |
| Silver medal – second place | 2023 Canada |
| Silver medal – second place | 2025 Czechia |
| Bronze medal – third place | 2019 Finland |
World U18 Championships
| Silver medal – second place | 2008 Canada |
| Silver medal – second place | 2009 Germany |

Marie-Philip Poulin CQ (born March 28, 1991) is a Canadian professional ice hockey centre and captain for the Montreal Victoire of the Professional Women's Hockey League (PWHL). She is also the captain of the Canada women's national ice hockey team. She was named the IIHF Female Player of the Year in 2025.

Poulin is a three-time Olympic gold medalist and four-time World Champion with the Canadian national team. She scored the game-winning goal in the gold medal games in three out of five of the Olympics in which she competed (2010, 2014 and 2022), for which she was dubbed Captain Clutch by her teammates and the media. Following another game-winning goal at the 2021 IIHF Women's World Championship, she completed an unprecedented "golden goal hat trick" at major international championships. Since 2015 she has served as the captain of Team Canada, leading them to silver medals at the 2018 and 2026 Winter Olympics and a gold medal at the 2022 Winter Olympics. She is the first person to score 20 Olympic goals in modern ice hockey.

Raised in Beauceville, Quebec, Poulin started her career playing for the Montreal Stars in the now-defunct Canadian Women's Hockey League at the age of 17, while also playing college hockey for the Dawson Blues. She left the team in 2010 to join the Boston Terriers women's hockey team. In 2015, Poulin returned to and captained the Stars, by then re-named Les Canadiennes de Montreal, before joining the Professional Women's Hockey Players Association (PWHPA), a non-profit dedicated to increasing the professionalization of women's hockey, in 2019. The PWHPA's efforts culminated in the creation of the PWHL, and Poulin played a key role in the negotiation of the collective bargaining agreement. In 2023, at the inception of the PWHL, she signed with PWHL Montreal (later the Montreal Victoire) and became its captain.

While playing with Les Canadiennes, Poulin won the Clarkson Cup twice and was named CWHL MVP three times. With the Victoire, she was the Billie Jean King Most Valuable Player for the PWHL's 2024–25 season, and captained the team to win the 2026 Walter Cup, receiving the Ilana Kloss Playoff Most Valuable Player honour for her efforts. Poulin is the first female hockey player to win the Northern Star Award as Canada's top athlete of the year, and the second to receive the Bobbie Rosenfeld Award as The Canadian Press' female athlete of the year. She is widely considered to be one of the greatest hockey players of all time.

== Early life ==
Marie-Philip Poulin was born on March 28, 1991, in Quebec City, Canada, to Robert and Danye Poulin. Poulin has one sibling, her older brother Pier-Alexandre Poulin. She was raised in the city of Beauceville, Quebec. Poulin began figure skating at the age of four, before being inspired by her brother to switch to hockey at age five. In a 2017 interview, Poulin said playing hockey outdoors with her brother during her childhood was one of her best memories of growing up. She first saw professional women's hockey on television during the 2002 Olympic Winter Games, when the Canada women's national ice hockey team won the first gold medal for Canada in ice hockey in more than 50 years.

== Playing career ==
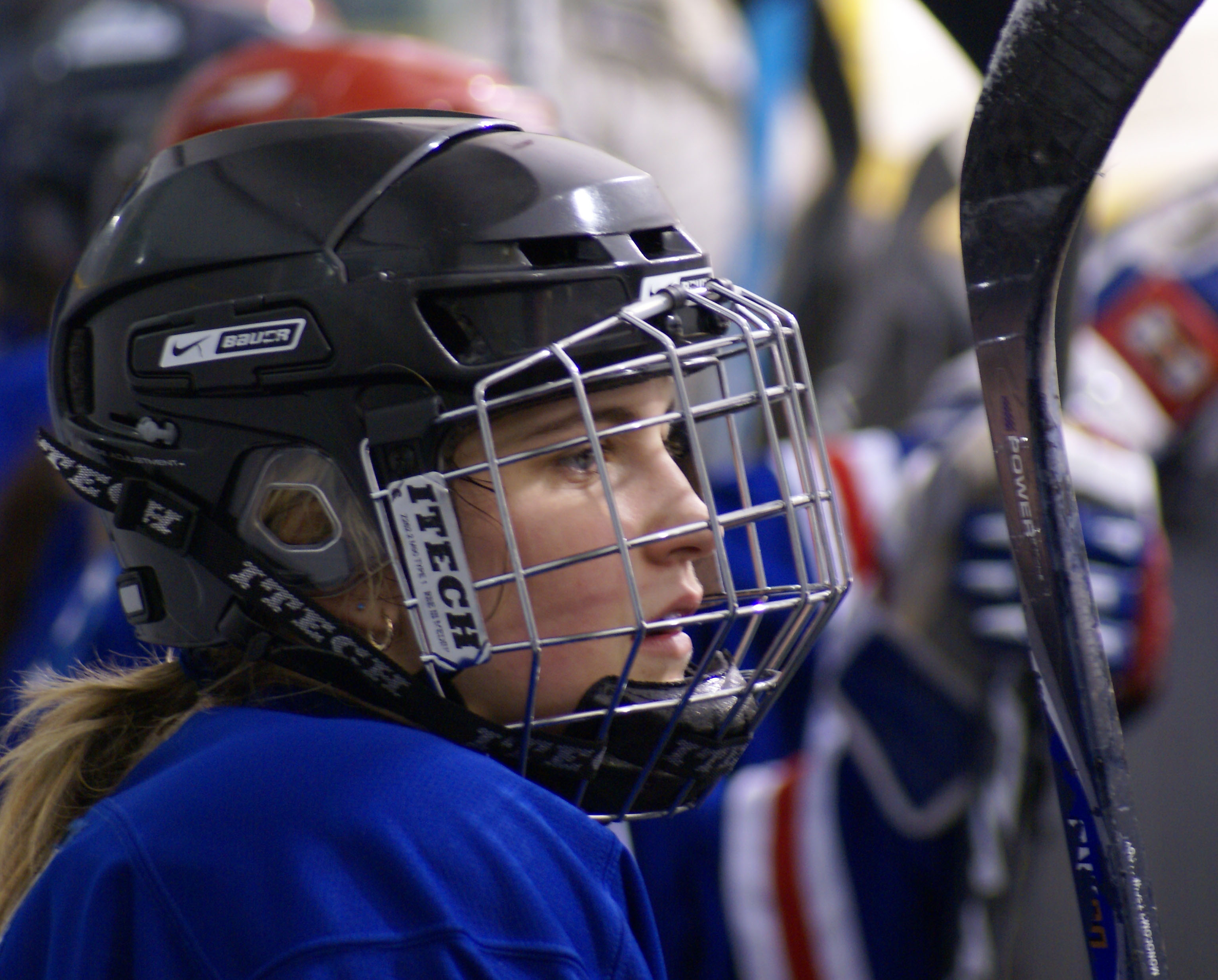
Poulin with the Montreal Stars in 2008.

=== Montreal Stars, 2007–09 ===
Poulin spent 2007–08 with the Montreal Stars of the Canadian Women's Hockey League (CWHL). She appeared in only 16 games, but led rookies in scoring with 22 goals and 21 assists. So dominant was she in half a season as a 16-year-old rookie that she finished runner up in the CWHL Most Valuable Player (MVP) vote by club captains. She was also a recipient of the Montreal Canadiens scholarship program in January 2008. For the 2008–09 season, while attending Dawson College, she played both with the Dawson Blues and as an associate player with the Stars. At year's end in March 2009, she helped the Stars win the first Clarkson Cup over the Minnesota Whitecaps in Kingston, Ontario. In the championship game, she assisted on a goal by Caroline Ouellette.

=== Boston University Terriers, 2010–15 ===
Poulin debuted with the Boston University Terriers women's program during the 2010–11 season. On October 2, 2010, she scored the first goal of her NCAA career in a 5–4 loss at North Dakota. With her third shorthanded goal of the season on October 15, she tied BU's single-season record for shorthanded tallies in just four games. She led all NCAA freshmen in goals (9) and points per game (2.00) during October 2010. In addition, she led all Hockey East freshmen in goals, assists, and points during the month. In the first seven games of her NCAA career, she had a seven-game point-scoring streak consisting of nine goals and seven assists. On December 7 and 10, two wins over Northeastern and Harvard, Poulin registered three goals. In both games, she had a total of 11 shots on goal and a +2 rating. On December 10, she scored two goals and a game-high eight shots as BU prevailed by a 5–3 mark over Harvard.

On January 15 and 16, 2011, Poulin recorded five points (2 goals, 3 assists) in BU's two wins over Boston College and Maine. Against BC, Poulin notched a power-play goal and two assists. Versus the Maine Black Bears, she registered a goal and an assist. On January 22, 2011, Poulin recorded a hat trick, including two power-play goals as BU prevailed over Vermont in a 4–0 win. The win was the Terriers' 100th win in program history. Poulin broke BU's single-season points record with her second goal of the game and later tied the single-season goals record with her third marker. She became the first Terriers player to be honoured as Hockey East Rookie of the Year in March 2011. A fracture of the shoulder did not hold her from action for the 2011–12 season.

On May 11, 2012, Terriers head coach Brian Durocher announced that the captains for the 2012–13 campaign would be Poulin and Jill Cardella. For the 2014–15 season, Poulin was appointed team captain. As captain, she would lead the team to its fourth consecutive Hockey East championship. After the 2015 Hockey East tournament, she would join Shannon Doyle and fellow Montreal resident Kayla Tutino on the All-Tournament Team.

=== Les Canadiennes de Montréal, 2015–19 ===
Poulin returned to the CWHL in the autumn of 2015 when she was selected third overall by the Stars in the 2015 CWHL Draft. Before the season began, the Stars announced a partnership with the NHL's Montreal Canadiens and re-branded as Les Canadiennes de Montréal. At the conclusion of the 2015–16 CWHL season, she was the inaugural winner of the Jayna Hefford Trophy as most valuable player; she also secured the Angela James Bowl as the league's top scorer.

Poulin captained the team to the 2017 Clarkson Cup championship, scoring two goals in the final in Ottawa, with Montreal defeating the Calgary Inferno by a score of 3–1. She won her second CWHL MVP award at the conclusion of the 2017 season.

Poulin decided not to return to Les Canadiennes after the Olympics for the run up to the 2018 Clarkson Cup. She helped lead the team back to contention ahead of the 2019 Clarkson Cup; however, Poulin missed the playoffs due to injury. She won the final MVP award in CWHL history, her third win of the award, for her 2019 performance.

=== Professional Women's Hockey Players Association (PWHPA), 2019–23 ===
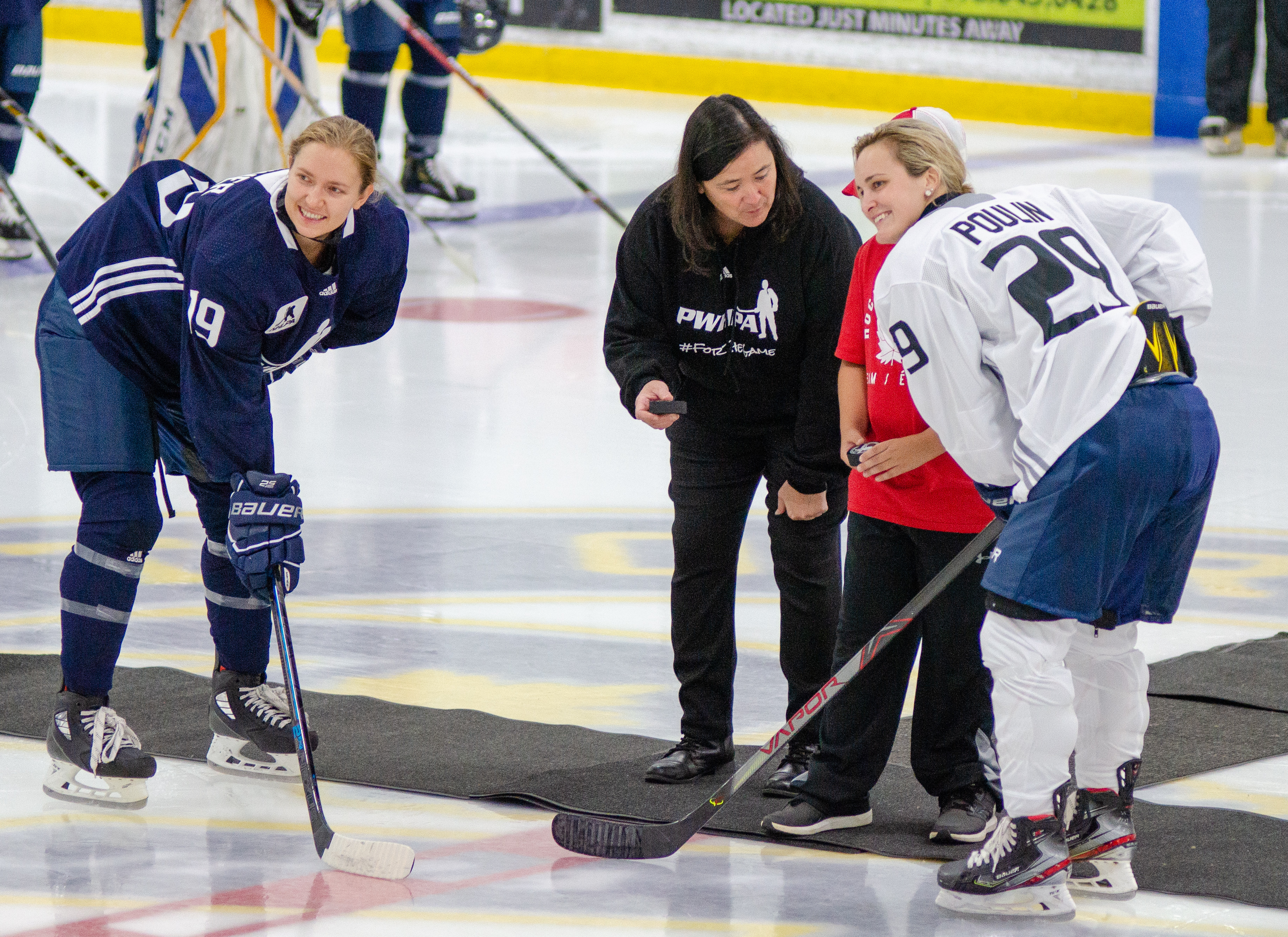
Poulin participating in a puck drop in 2019 during the Dream Gap Tour.

The CWHL abruptly collapsed after the 2018–19 season. In the wake of the collapse, Poulin joined the #ForTheGame movement that led to the creation of the PWHPA. Poulin captained one of four teams in the first PWHPA Dream Gap tour showcase in Toronto in September 2019, leading her team to a 2–0 record in the weekend round-robin tournament. As a member of the PWHPA, she took part in the Elite Women's Showcase at the 2020 NHL All-Star Game. She was afterwards voted as the best female hockey player in the world by NHL players, after having finished second in the vote the year before. In December 2019, she had been named among the top-4 Québecois athletes of the 2010s decade by the readers of La Presse.

Poulin was among several high-profile PWHPA members who reacted indifferently to the news of the National Women's Hockey League's 2020 expansion into Canada with the addition of the Toronto Six, stating that "I think there's a reason why many of us are not playing in that league."

At the 2021 Secret Cup, which was the Canadian leg of the 2020–21 PWHPA Dream Gap Tour, Poulin scored the third-period game-winner for Team Bauer (Montreal) in a 4-2 championship win over Team Sonnet (Toronto). She also recorded two assists for a three-point performance. Overall, Poulin was the scoring champion in the 2021 Secret Cup, with five goals and six assists in five games. In what would prove to be the final PWHPA season in 2023–24, Poulin led the Dream Gap Tour in scoring with 12 goals and 27 points in 20 games, and help lead Team Harvey's to the 2023 Secret Cup title.

=== Montreal Victoire, 2023–present ===
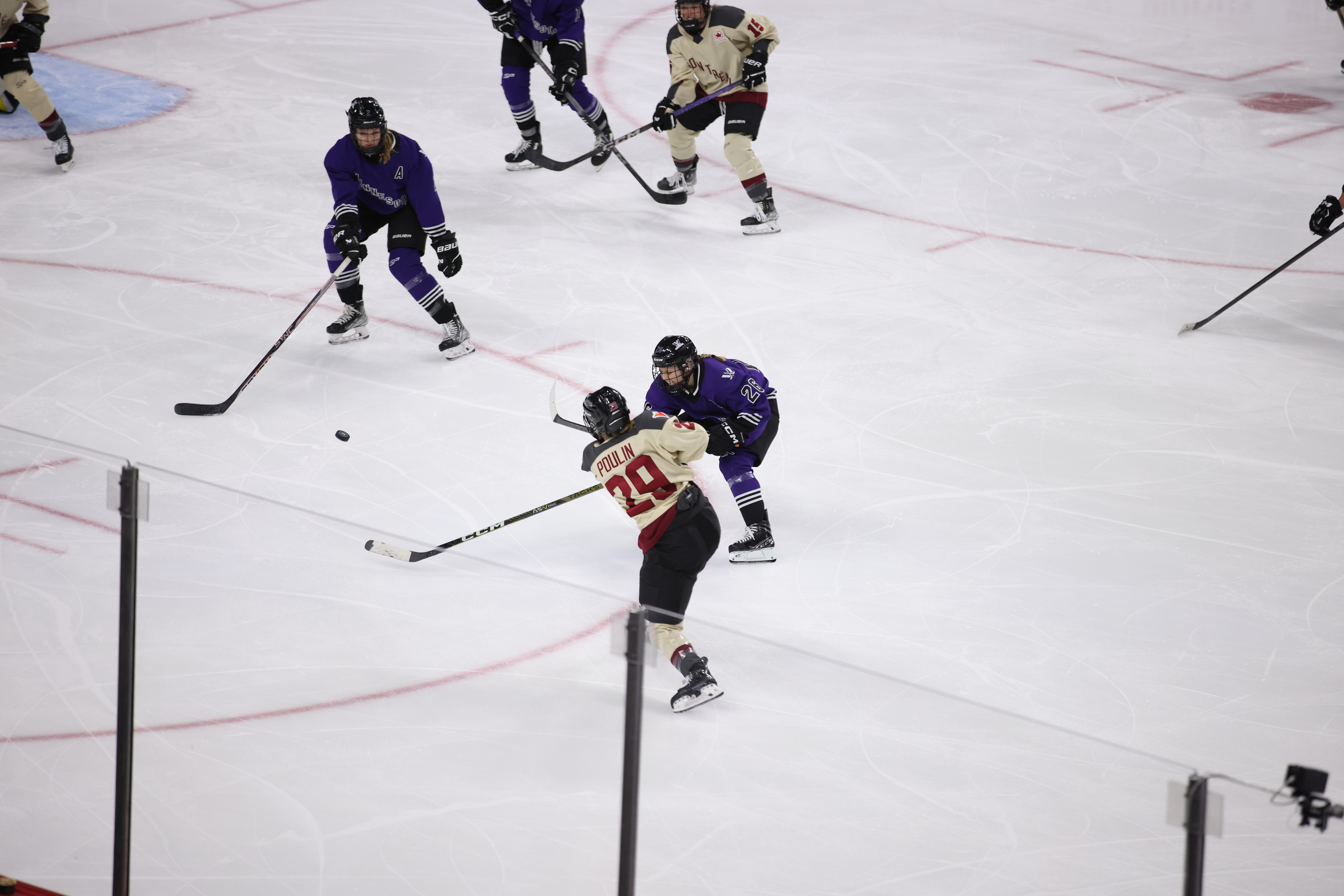
Poulin takes a shot for the Montréal Victoire against the Minnesota Frost on January 6, 2024.

In 2023, the PWHPA bought out the rival Premier Hockey Federation and launched the new Professional Women's Hockey League (PWHL). Poulin, who was credited with an important role in pursuing a collective bargaining agreement in the new league, spoke of her desire to create "a viable professional league for the next generation, for ourselves." With each of the six new teams able to make three initial free agency signings, Poulin was widely assessed as the best player available, but it was generally assumed that she would sign with the Montreal team. The Athletic remarked that "it would be cool to see a bidding war between teams for Poulin," but acknowledged "we're just waiting for the Montreal signing announcement." On September 5, Poulin, along with Laura Stacey and Ann-Renée Desbiens, were reported as the Montreal team's first three players.

In 2023, Poulin was named Montreal's captain. PWHL Montreal finished in second in the PWHL's inaugural regular season, but were eliminated in the first round of the playoffs by PWHL Boston. Poulin missed three games of the regular season, but still finished tied for second in points, with 23 in 21 games played. She was named a First Team All-Star, and was a finalist for both the Billie Jean King Most Valuable Player and the Forward of the Year award.

Ahead of the 2024–25 PWHL season, all of the PWHL's franchises adopted new names, with PWHL Montreal rebranded to the Montreal Victoire. On January 29, 2025, Poulin scored the first hat trick of the season against the Ottawa Charge. The Victoire finished first in the league in the regular season, while Poulin claimed the PWHL Top Goal Scorer award with a league-leading 19 goals in 30 games (and 26 points total). She later received the Billie Jean King Most Valuable Player honour, the league's Forward of the Year award, and her second First Team All-Star designation. The Victoire faced the Charge in the semi-finals of the playoffs, and were ousted in four games. Poulin, described as "devastated" at the team's failure to reach the final for a second year, said "we're going to need to look in the mirror and see what we can do differently, how we can change and how we can get better."

During the 2025 PWHL Expansion Draft, held due to the introduction of the league's Seattle and Vancouver clubs, Poulin was one of three players protected by Montreal. It was reported in September that she had agreed to restructure the final year of her initial three-year contract to reduce her salary, in order to enable the team to add depth while still complying with the salary cap. She then signed a two-year contract extension with the Victoire on October 23. Poulin returned from the 2026 Winter Olympics with a right leg injury that caused her to miss the first Victoire game after the league hiatus. In a March 15 game against the Boston Fleet, Poulin collided with Fleet forward Shay Maloney, reinjuring her leg, with what would later be revealed to be a torn anterior cruciate ligament and meniscus tear in her right knee. As a result, she was eventually placed on long-term injured reserve. After missing ten games, she returned to the lineup for the Victoire's final game of the regular season on April 25. The Victoire finished first in the league for a second consecutive year, and elected to face the Minnesota Frost in the semi-final round. On May 12, Poulin scored the series-winning goal in Game 5, giving Montreal its first playoff series victory and reaching the Walter Cup Finals for the first time. The Victoire defeated the Charge in four games to take their first title, the first time a Canadian team won the Walter Cup. With two goals and six assists in nine postseason games, Poulin tied teammate Abby Roque for the PWHL playoff points lead, and was voted the recipient of the Ilana Kloss Playoff Most Valuable Player award.

During the 2026 PWHL Expansion Draft, Poulin was again one of three players protected by Montreal. On June 25, she announced that she would have knee surgery in July to address the injury she had played through during the postseason. General manager Daniele Sauvageau stated it was uncertain whether Poulin would return during the 2026–27 season.

== International play ==
=== Early career, 2007–14 ===
At the age of sixteen, Poulin made her senior Team Canada debut during the Fall Festival in Prince George, an exhibition series against Sweden, the reigning Olympic silver medalist. Playing for Canada Red, Poulin recorded four goals and one assist in two games.

Poulin participated at the inaugural 2008 IIHF World Women's U18 Championship in Calgary and was Canada's leading scorer. In a January 9, 2008, contest versus Germany, Poulin notched one goal and two assists in a 10–1 win. The team won a silver medal, with Poulin finishing the tournament with eight goals and six assists in five games. Her eight goals would be a Canadian team record until 2023, when Caitlin Kraemer scored ten. After winning a second silver medal in 2009, Poulin became the all-time leading scorer in under-18 team history, with 31 points in 17 games.

She made her full-time debut on the Canadian senior team at the 2009 IIHF Women's World Championship in Hameenlinna, Finland, earning a silver medal.

Poulin scored both goals during Team Canada's 2–0 win in the gold medal game against the United States at the 2010 Winter Olympics. At the end of the tournament, Poulin was named to the tournament all-star team. At the 2010 4 Nations Cup later that year, she scored a hat trick against Finland on November 12; Canada went on to defeat the US to win the tournament.

In a game versus Russia at the 2012 IIHF Women's World Championship, Poulin put in a three-point performance in a 14–1 victory. By claiming the gold medal at the tournament, Poulin (along with Catherine Ward) became the sixth and seventh members of the (unofficial—not yet recognized by the IIHF) Triple Gold Club for Women, having won gold in the Olympic Games and the IIHF World Championships, as well as the Clarkson Cup. In August 2012, Poulin was named the captain of the Canadian Under-22 team that competed in an exhibition series versus the United States Under-22 squad in Calgary, Alberta.

Named to her second Olympic team for the 2014 Winter Olympics in Sochi, Poulin scored the game-tying and game-winning goals in Team Canada's 3–2 overtime win in the gold medal game against the United States. The first goal came with 54.6 seconds left in regulation, the latter on a 4-on-3 power play at 8:10 of overtime.

=== Captaincy, 2015–present ===
Poulin was named team captain for the 2015 IIHF Women's World Championship. She registered six points for Team Canada in the course of the tournament, including a goal in the final game, a 7–5 loss to Team USA. Poulin continued to serve as captain at the women's tournament at the 2018 Winter Olympics in Pyeongchang, where Canada won silver.

Due to a knee injury sustained in the CWHL, Poulin withdrew from the 2019 IIHF Women's World Championship after playing less than five minutes. In her absence, Team Canada was defeated by Finland in the semi-final, missing the gold medal game for the first time in the history of the event.

After a lengthy time off-ice due to injury and the cancellation of the 2020 IIHF Women's World Championships due to the COVID-19 pandemic, Poulin returned to the ice for a PWHPA showcase in May 2021. At the 2021 IIHF Women's World Championship, held in a bubble in Calgary, Poulin sustained an injury blocking a shot from a Swiss player in a preliminary game. She was rested for the remainder of group play, as well as the quarter-final match, returning for the team's semi-final match against Switzerland, where she scored a goal as part of a 4–0 victory. In the final against the United States, Poulin scored the golden goal in overtime, earning Canada the gold over the United States for the first time since 2012. She was named player of the game. Poulin is the first ice hockey player in history to score three golden goals at major tournaments; as of 2025, she holds the world's only such "golden goal hat trick".

On January 11, 2022, Poulin was named to Canada's 2022 Olympic team. She served as one of Canada's flag bearers at the opening ceremonies, alongside speed skater Charles Hamelin. Poulin logged a career-best 17 points (6 goals and 11 assists) during the women's tournament, capping it with a two-goal performance in Canada's 3–2 victory over the United States in the gold medal game. She became the only player in history—male or female—to score goals in four straight Olympic finals; she has scored a total of seven goals in her four Olympic finals. On the team, she said: "We celebrate each other's success, we want to succeed and to be honest it just showed tonight." Later in 2022, at the 2022 IIHF Women's World Championship, Poulin captained Canada to its third major international title inside a span of twelve months. This was the first time Canada had won consecutive Women's World titles in 18 years. In October 2022, Canadian sports network TSN named her the "best women's hockey player on the planet," adding "there's no denying that Poulin is the best player in the world; the debate is whether she is the best ever." Further honours followed by year's end, when she received the Northern Star Award (formerly the Lou Marsh Trophy) as Canada's top athlete of 2022, and was The Canadian Press's choice for Bobbie Rosenfeld Award for female athlete of the year.

Poulin scored her 200th point with Team Canada on February 22, 2023, in Game 6 of the 2022-2023 Rivalry Series against the United States, in Laval, Quebec. She is the fifth women's hockey player to achieve 200 points with Hockey Canada. Poulin scored her 100th goal for Team Canada on April 7, 2023, in the team's second preliminary round game at the 2023 IIHF Women's World Championship, and scored her 101st later in the same game. She was the fourth Canadian women's player to reach the triple digit mark.

Slowed by injury coming into the 2024 Women's World Championship, she scored her first two goals of the event in the final to help Canada to a 6–5 overtime win over the United States, giving Canada a record thirteenth World title. The following year, at the 2025 Women's World Championship, Poulin passed Hayley Wickenheiser as Canada's top point-scorer in tournament history, recording her record-breaking 87th career point in the team's 8–1 semifinal victory over Finland. Canada was defeated by the United States in the tournament final, but Poulin was named World Championship MVP for the second time in her career.

On January 9, 2026, Poulin was named to Canada's roster to compete at the 2026 Winter Olympics. She came off injured in the first period and did not return to the ice during the game following a hit by Kristýna Kaltounková in Canada's 5–1 victory over Czechia on February 9, 2026. She was ruled out from selection in the following game against the United States due to the lower-body injury, with alternate captain Renata Fast saying that Poulin “is our biggest leader, and it is hard for all of us to see her be injured. We hope that she is healthy, and we will pick her up as much as we can". She ultimately missed two games, returning for Canada's quarterfinal matchup with Germany. She scored in the game, a 5–1 win, tying Hayley Wickenheiser for most Olympic goals all-time with 18. In the semi-final against Switzerland, Poulin scored both Canadian goals in a narrow 2–1 victory, surpassing Wickenheiser's record and becoming the first woman to score 20 goals at the Olympics. Poulin is also one of three Canadian players to score at least one goal at five different Olympics, joining Jayna Hefford and Hayley Wickenheiser. Canada would lose in overtime in the gold medal game, with Poulin earning her second Olympic silver medal, and fifth medal overall. This was her first Olympic final in which she did not score a goal. In recognition of her efforts, she was named to the tournament All-Star Team for the third time, and received the Best Forward directorate award for the first time. Poulin declined to comment on whether this would be her final Olympics.

== Style of play ==
Poulin is widely considered to be one of the greatest women's hockey players of all time. She has also been argued to be the greatest player to represent Canada of any gender, drawing comparisons to Sidney Crosby, the contemporary captain of the Canadian national men's team.

Poulin is known for her clutch play, with a high ability to perform well under pressure. The nickname "Captain Clutch" was first used to describe Poulin by her teammates as a result of her performance in the 2014 Sochi Winter Olympics, a nickname which was widely subsequently adopted in media and fan coverage. She is the first female hockey player to win the Northern Star Award as Canada's top athlete of the year, and the second ice hockey player to receive the Bobbie Rosenfeld Award as The Canadian Press' female athlete of the year.

== Other work ==
In June 2022, Poulin was hired by the Montreal Canadiens as a player development consultant. She said she felt "very lucky that they hired me and they have confidence in me not only for my hockey experience but as a person as well." Canadiens owner Geoff Molson called Poulin "a winner—she knows how to win—and our players are young and they need to learn that as well."

== Personal life ==
Poulin studied psychology while playing for Boston University. Her brother, Pier-Alexandre Poulin, played 116 games in the QMJHL with the St. John's Fog Devils and the Chicoutimi Saguenéens.

On May 26, 2023, Poulin announced her engagement to Team Canada and Montréal Victoire teammate Laura Stacey, with whom she has been in a relationship since 2017. They married on September 28, 2024. The couple resides in Montreal with their dog Arlo.

Poulin was a named a knight of the National Order of Quebec in 2024.

In the CBC interview series The Assembly, where prominent guests face unscripted, unpredictable and direct questions from a rotating panel of autistic, neurodivergent and/or intellectually disabled individuals, Poulin spoke openly about being a lesbian. A panelist named Austin asked her, whether she had ever tried to deny her sexuality, or convince herself that she wasn't a lesbian. Poulin replied: "Yes, I did denied it. Yes, I tried to hide it. Yes, I isolated myself." She revealed, that she regrets having kept her sexuality hidden, noting that she lost valuable years and moments, time she wishes she could undo and reclaim. Poulin explained that her family supported her from the very beginning, even though they were in fact the people from whom she had isolated herself the most and that coming out and embracing her identity helped her become a better athlete.

== Career statistics ==
=== Regular season and playoffs ===
Note: Montréal Stars changed their name to Les Canadiennes de Montréal in 2015.

| | | | Regular season | | | | | Playoffs |
| Season | Team | League | GP | G | A | Pts | PIM | GP | G | A | Pts | PIM |
|---|---|---|---|---|---|---|---|---|---|---|---|---|
| 2007–08 | Montréal Stars | CWHL | 16 | 22 | 21 | 43 | 16 | 2 | 2 | 1 | 3 | 4 |
| 2008–09 | Montréal Stars | CWHL | 6 | 4 | 4 | 8 | 8 | — | — | — | — | — |
| 2009–10 | Montréal Stars | CWHL | — | — | — | — | — | — | — | — | — | — |
| 2010–11 | Boston University | HE | 28 | 24 | 23 | 47 | 22 | — | — | — | — | — |
| 2011–12 | Boston University | HE | 16 | 11 | 14 | 25 | 14 | — | — | — | — | — |
| 2012–13 | Boston University | HE | 35 | 19 | 36 | 55 | 18 | — | — | — | — | — |
| 2013–14 | Canada (AMHL) | HE | 8 | 1 | 3 | 4 | 6 | — | — | — | — | — |
| 2014–15 | Boston University | HE | 32 | 27 | 27 | 54 | 18 | — | — | — | — | — |
| 2015–16 | Les Canadiennes de Montréal | CWHL | 22 | 23 | 23 | 46 | 10 | 3 | 4 | 5 | 9 | 2 |
| 2016–17 | Les Canadiennes de Montréal | CWHL | 23 | 15 | 22 | 37 | 6 | — | — | — | — | — |
| 2017–18 | Les Canadiennes de Montréal | CWHL | — | — | — | — | — | — | — | — | — | — |
| 2018–19 | Les Canadiennes de Montréal | CWHL | 26 | 23 | 27 | 50 | 12 | — | — | — | — | — |
| 2019–20 | Montréal | PWHPA | — | — | — | — | — | — | — | — | — | — |
| 2020–21 | Montréal | PWHPA | 4 | 5 | 6 | 11 | 2 | — | — | — | — | — |
| 2022–23 | Team Harvey's | PWHPA | 20 | 12 | 15 | 27 | 10 | — | — | — | — | — |
| 2023–24 | PWHL Montreal | PWHL | 21 | 10 | 13 | 23 | 14 | 3 | 1 | 1 | 2 | 0 |
| 2024–25 | Montréal Victoire | PWHL | 30 | 19 | 7 | 26 | 21 | 4 | 1 | 1 | 2 | 2 |
| 2025–26 | Montréal Victoire | PWHL | 19 | 9 | 9 | 18 | 20 | 9 | 2 | 6 | 8 | 6 |
| PWHL totals | | | 70 | 38 | 29 | 67 | 55 | 16 | 4 | 8 | 12 | 8 |
| CWHL totals | | | 93 | 87 | 97 | 184 | 52 | 5 | 6 | 6 | 12 | 6 |

=== International ===
| Year | Team | Event | Result | GP | G | A | Pts | PIM |
|---|---|---|---|---|---|---|---|---|
| 2008 | Canada | U18 | 2nd place, silver medalist(s) | 5 | 8 | 6 | 14 | 4 |
| 2009 | Canada | U18 | 2nd place, silver medalist(s) | 5 | 5 | 7 | 12 | 2 |
| 2009 | Canada | WC | 2nd place, silver medalist(s) | 5 | 2 | 3 | 5 | 0 |
| 2010 | Canada | OG | 1st place, gold medalist(s) | 5 | 5 | 2 | 7 | 2 |
| 2011 | Canada | WC | 2nd place, silver medalist(s) | 5 | 3 | 1 | 4 | 4 |
| 2012 | Canada | WC | 1st place, gold medalist(s) | 5 | 3 | 4 | 7 | 6 |
| 2013 | Canada | WC | 2nd place, silver medalist(s) | 5 | 6 | 6 | 12 | 2 |
| 2014 | Canada | OG | 1st place, gold medalist(s) | 5 | 3 | 2 | 5 | 0 |
| 2015 | Canada | WC | 2nd place, silver medalist(s) | 5 | 3 | 3 | 6 | 2 |
| 2016 | Canada | WC | 2nd place, silver medalist(s) | 5 | 2 | 4 | 6 | 6 |
| 2017 | Canada | WC | 2nd place, silver medalist(s) | 5 | 2 | 4 | 6 | 2 |
| 2018 | Canada | OG | 2nd place, silver medalist(s) | 5 | 3 | 3 | 6 | 8 |
| 2019 | Canada | WC | 3rd place, bronze medalist(s) | 3 | 0 | 0 | 0 | 0 |
| 2021 | Canada | WC | 1st place, gold medalist(s) | 6 | 3 | 6 | 9 | 2 |
| 2022 | Canada | OG | 1st place, gold medalist(s) | 7 | 6 | 11 | 17 | 6 |
| 2022 | Canada | WC | 1st place, gold medalist(s) | 7 | 5 | 5 | 10 | 6 |
| 2023 | Canada | WC | 2nd place, silver medalist(s) | 7 | 4 | 4 | 8 | 8 |
| 2024 | Canada | WC | 1st place, gold medalist(s) | 7 | 2 | 2 | 4 | 6 |
| 2025 | Canada | WC | 2nd place, silver medalist(s) | 7 | 4 | 8 | 12 | 2 |
| 2026 | Canada | OG | 2nd place, silver medalist(s) | 4 | 3 | 1 | 4 | 2 |
| Junior totals | | | | 10 | 13 | 13 | 26 | 6 |
| Senior totals | | | | 98 | 59 | 69 | 128 | 64 |

== Awards and honours ==
| Award | Year(s) | Ref. |
AA
| Rookie of the Year Award | 2008–09 | |
| Player of the Year Award | 2008–09 | |
NCAA
| New England Women's Division I All-Star Team | 2010–11 | |
| Hockey East All-Rookie Team | 2010–11 | |
| Hockey East Rookie of the Year | 2010–11 | |
| Hockey East All-Tournament Team | 2012–12 | |
| Hockey East First Team All-Star | 2012–13 | |
| New England Division I All-Star | 2012–13 | |
| Frozen Four All-Tournament Team | 2012–13 | |
| Division I First Team All-American | 2014–15 | |
| Hockey East First All-Star Team | 2014–15 | |
CWHL
| Outstanding Rookie | 2007–08 | |
| All-Rookie Team | 2007–08 | |
| Eastern All-Star Team | 2007–08 | |
| Clarkson Cup champion | 2009, 2017 | |
| Angela James Bowl | 2015–16, 2016–17, 2018–19 | |
| Jayna Hefford Trophy | 2015–16, 2016–17, 2018–19 | |
PWHL
| First All-Star Team | 2023–24, 2024–25 | |
| Top Goal Scorer | 2024–25 | |
| Forward of the Year | 2024–25 | |
| Billie Jean King Most Valuable Player | 2024–25 | |
| Walter Cup champion | 2026 | |
| Ilana Kloss Playoff Most Valuable Player | 2026 | |
International
| U18 World Championship Best Forward | 2008 | |
| Winter Olympics Media All-Star Team | 2010, 2022, 2026 | |
| World Championship Most Valuable Player | 2013, 2025 | |
| World Championship Best Forward | 2013, 2025 | |
| World Championship Media All-Star Team | 2013, 2023, 2025 | |
| IIHF Female Player of the Year | 2025 | |
| Winter Olympics Best Forward | 2026 | |
Other
| Isobel Gathorne-Hardy Award | 2021 | |
| Northern Star Award | 2022 | |
| Bobbie Rosenfeld Award | 2022 | |
| National Order of Quebec | 2024 | |
| Honorary degree from the Bishop's University | 2026 | |

== See also ==
- LGBTQ people in ice hockey

Olympic Games
| Preceded by Miranda Ayim; Nathan Hirayama | Flagbearer for Canada; 2022 Beijing (with Charles Hamelin) | Next: Maude Charron; Andre De Grasse |
Sporting positions
| Preceded by Position created | Montreal Victoire captain 2023–present | Incumbent |
