= Professional Women's Hockey Players Association =

Organization for promoting women's ice hockey

- Abbreviation: PWHPA
- Founded: May 20, 2019
- Dissolved: 2023 with the formation of the Professional Women's Hockey League Players Association
- Headquarters: Philadelphia, United States
- Location(s): Canada; United States
- Operations Consultant: Jayna Hefford
- Advisory Consultant: Ilana Kloss
- Board of directors: Jocelyne Lamoureux-Davidson; Alyssa Gagliardi; Brianne Jenner; Hilary Knight; Liz Knox; Sarah Nurse; Kimberly Sass; Kendall Coyne-Schofield
- Website: PWHPA.com

The Professional Women's Hockey Players Association (PWHPA) was a nonprofit organization dedicated to advocating for the promotion of professional women's ice hockey. It was founded in May 2019 following the dissolution of the Canadian Women's Hockey League. PWHPA members expressed dissatisfaction with the operations of the existing professional National Women's Hockey League (renamed the Premier Hockey Federation in 2021) and vowed to boycott existing women's leagues and to work towards the establishment of a unified, financially sustainable professional league. From 2019 to 2023, the PWHPA organized a series of exhibition seasons, known as the Dream Gap tours, to generate support towards its goal.

After partnering with Mark Walter and Billie Jean King in 2022, the PWHPA organized a formal players union in 2023 and negotiated a collective bargaining agreement. Mark Walter Group and BJK Enterprises then purchased the Premier Hockey Federation and wound down its operations before announcing the launch of the new Professional Women's Hockey League (PWHL). The PWHL began play in 2024 with six teams in Canada and the United States, marking a major victory for the PWHPA.

== History ==
=== Establishment ===
Beginning in the late 1990s, several high-level amateur and semi-professional women's ice hockey leagues appeared in Canada and the United States. The National Women's Hockey League was founded in 1999, mainly comprising teams in Eastern Canada in Ontario and Quebec, before folding in 2007. A western counterpart, the Western Women's Hockey League (WWHL) launched in 2004 and lasted until 2011. The Canadian Women's Hockey League (CWHL) was founded to replace the NWHL in 2007, and it strove to become a professional league while placing a greater emphasis on player involvement. However, the league could typically pay only for travel, ice time, uniforms, and some equipment, and did not pay players a salary. From 2011 to 2015, the CWHL was the only organized top-level women's hockey league in North America.

In 2015, a second National Women's Hockey League (NWHL) was launched in the United States, and was the first women's hockey league to pay its players. In 2017, the CWHL followed suit and began paying its players a stipend. Following the 2018–19 season, the CWHL abruptly ceased operations, citing the fragmentation of corporate sponsors between the CWHL and NWHL, a lack of viewership, and reduced revenue from a partnership in China as eroding the league's financial stability. This left the NWHL—which had earlier in 2019 approached the CWHL to propose a merger—as the only top-level option for women's players.

On May 2, 2019, over 200 players from both the CWHL and NWHL released a joint statement, underlined by the hashtag #ForTheGame, announcing their intent to boycott any North American professional league for the 2019–20 season, citing their dissatisfaction in the operations of both leagues in that neither provided health insurance or a livable salary. They stated their intent to work towards the establishment of a unified, financially sustainable professional league. On May 20, the players formed a non-profit called the Professional Women's Hockey Players Association (PWHPA) to advance their mission. Initially, PWHPA members hoped that the boycott would last for only one year.

=== Boycott and Dream Gap tour ===
==== Relations with the NWHL/PHF ====
The NWHL responded to the boycott announcement by stating that they were pursuing increased sponsorships with a view to increasing player salaries—which had reportedly decreased to as low as $2,000 in some cases—and an offer to give players a 50 percent split of revenue on league sponsorship and media deals. However, with a large number of North American players boycotting the NWHL, more than half of the signed players on opening rosters for the 2019–20 NWHL season were new to the league.

Over the next four years, the relationship between the PWHPA and the NWHL was strained. While a significant number of players defected from the NWHL in 2019 to help form the PWHPA, dozens would return to the league in the following years, citing improving conditions—the league markedly increased its salary cap after 2019—and a desire to play in a league. Notably, in 2023 Noora Räty resigned from the PWHPA board to sign a six-figure contract with the Metropolitan Riveters of the then-rebranded Premier Hockey Federation (PHF). However, the PWHPA consistently criticized the PHF and its business model, and rejected overtures to merge. PWHPA players raised concerns over a perceived lack of professionalism and sub-standard conditions within the NWHL. American Olympian Hilary Knight stated that the NWHL was "a glorified beer league" offering the "illusion of professionalism", while retired Canadian legend Hayley Wickenheiser called it a "so-called pro league". PWHPA players stated that they disagreed with the NWHL's approach to growing women's hockey, calling for a less incremental approach. NWHL founder and commissioner Dani Rylan was sometimes cited as a point of contention; Rylan ultimately resigned in 2020.

Another significant issue was the role of the National Hockey League (NHL). While the PWHPA hoped to receive support from the NHL in establishing a new professional league, a number of NHL teams had previously established ties with PHF teams, and the NHL stated that it would not put its support fully behind one effort or the other, encouraging the sides to merge.

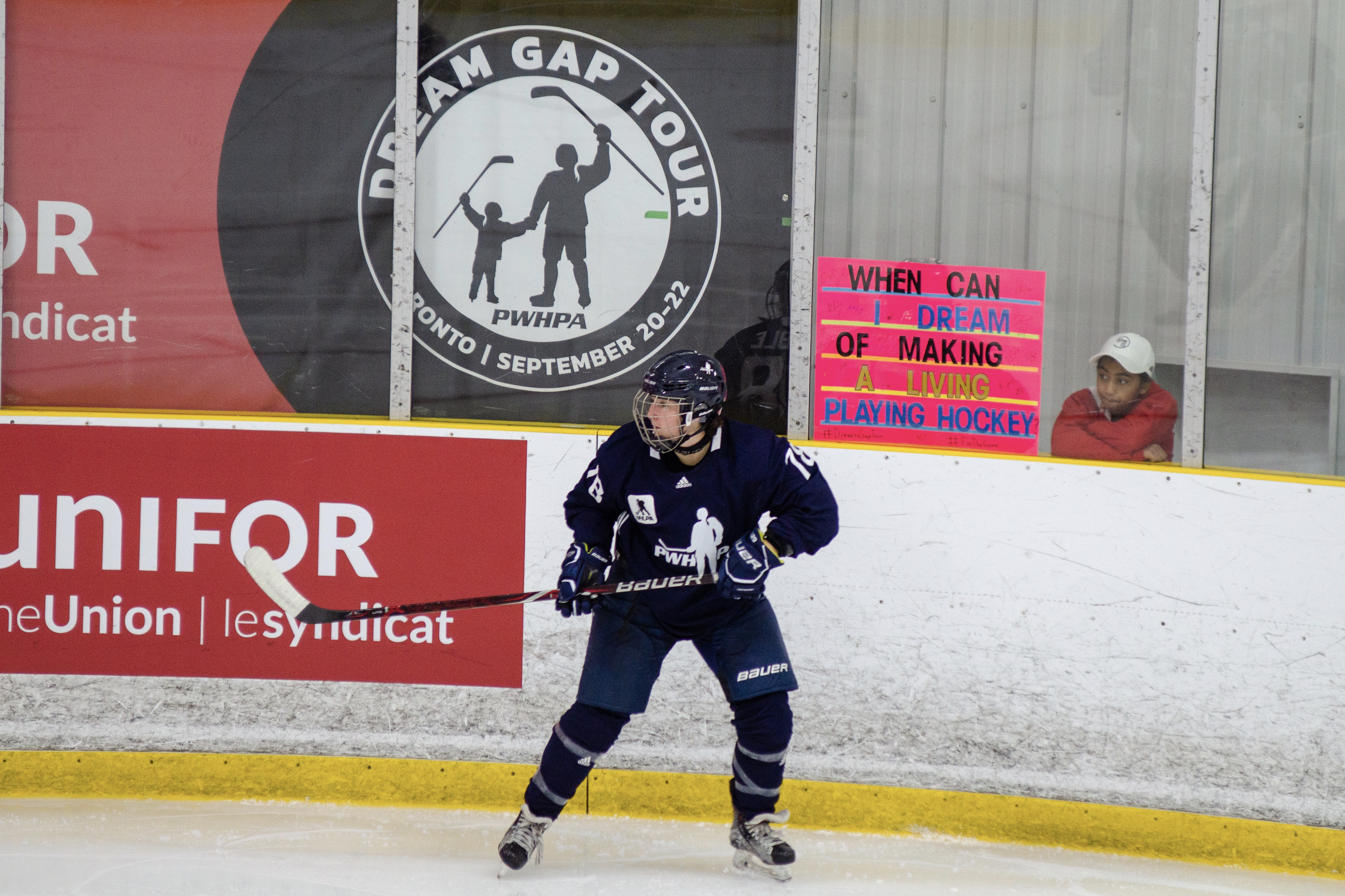
Anissa Gamble during the PWHPA Dream Gap Tour in September 2019.

==== PWHPA partnerships ====
After its formation, the PWHPA focused its efforts on courting corporate and media sponsorships, while also managing to form a number of partnerships directly with NHL teams. The PWHPA launched a "Dream Gap" tour, meant to highlight the disparity in support between men's and women's hockey and to increase support for the latter. As the PWHPA boycott stretched beyond a single season, the Dream Gap tour became an annual "season" of exhibition tournaments. The final Dream Gap season saw four teams competing for the Secret Cup, with Team Harvey's prevailing over Team Scotiabank in the final.

The PWHPA formed an early advisory partnership with American tennis legend Billie Jean King, an early advocate for women's equality in sports and the founder of the Women's Tennis Association. In December 2019, the PWHPA partnered with the ECHL and chose four members to participate in the 2020 ECHL All-Star Game, with Dani Cameranesi, Kali Flanagan, Gigi Marvin, and Annie Pankowski each assigned to one of the four teams. The 2020 NHL All-Star Game also expanded its inclusion of female skaters from previous seasons to a full three-on-three exhibition game between teams composed of American and Canadian women's players. Eighteen of the 20 players were active PWHPA members and the event was supported by the PWHPA, but it was not directly in partnership with the association. In March 2020, the PWHPA partnered with the Arizona Coyotes for their sixth Dream Gap tour stop in Tempe, Arizona. The New York Rangers became the first NHL team to host a PWHPA game on February 28, 2021, at Madison Square Garden. The PWHPA announced it would also be partnering with the Toronto Maple Leafs with the team hosting a game and providing marketing assistance and sponsorship consultation services.

In 2022, the PWHPA entered a formal partnership with Mark Walter, owner of the Los Angeles Dodgers, and Billie Jean King with the intent to launch their new professional league.

=== Launch of the PWHL ===
In February 2023, the PWHPA organized a formal labour union—the Professional Women's Hockey League Players Association (PWHLPA)—to negotiate a collective bargaining agreement (CBA) for the new league. The eight-year agreement was finalized in June and ratified by July 3, making it effective from August 1, 2023, to July 31, 2031. The CBA establishes an average salary target of $55,000 for teams in the new league, with each team required to sign at least six players to a minimum salary of $80,000 and no more than nine players to a league minimum $35,000, with the minimum and average salaries slated to increase 3% per year of the agreement. The agreement, which included health and other employment benefits, marked a major victory for the PWHPA.

On August 29, 2023, the union hired Brian Burke to serve as its executive director. Its executive committee comprises Brianne Jenner, Sarah Nurse, Hilary Knight, Liz Knox, and Kendall Coyne Schofield.

During the ratification vote for the new CBA, it was announced on June 30, 2023, that Mark Walter Group and BJK Enterprises had purchased the PHF, opening the way for the establishment of a new, unified league. The PHF was ultimately wound down and in late August, the partners announced the foundation of the Professional Women's Hockey League (PWHL), with the intent of beginning play in January 2024. Six teams—three each based in Canada and the United States—were established, a PWHL draft was held in September 2023, and training and evaluation camps were held in November and December. League play began on January 1, 2024.

== Leadership ==
Ballard Spahr, LLP provided pro bono support to help create the PWHPA. Nine players made up the founding board: Jocelyne Lamoureux-Davidson, Alyssa Gagliardi, Brianne Jenner, Hilary Knight, Liz Knox, Noora Räty, Kimberly Sass, Kendall Coyne-Schofield, and Shannon Szabados. On September 2, 2020, Knox resigned from the board to allow Sarah Nurse, one of only a few black players in the PWHPA, to take her place. Former CWHL interim commissioner Jayna Hefford was hired as the PWHPA operations consultant in August 2019.

In May 2023, Räty resigned from the board to sign a PHF contract. By then, the PWHPA board had eight members, seven of whom were founders: Lamoureux-Davidson, Gagliardi, Jenner, Knight, Knox, Nurse, Sass, and Coyne-Schofield.

Support from the NHL was credited with helping to expedite the launch of the PWHL.

== PWHPA seasons ==
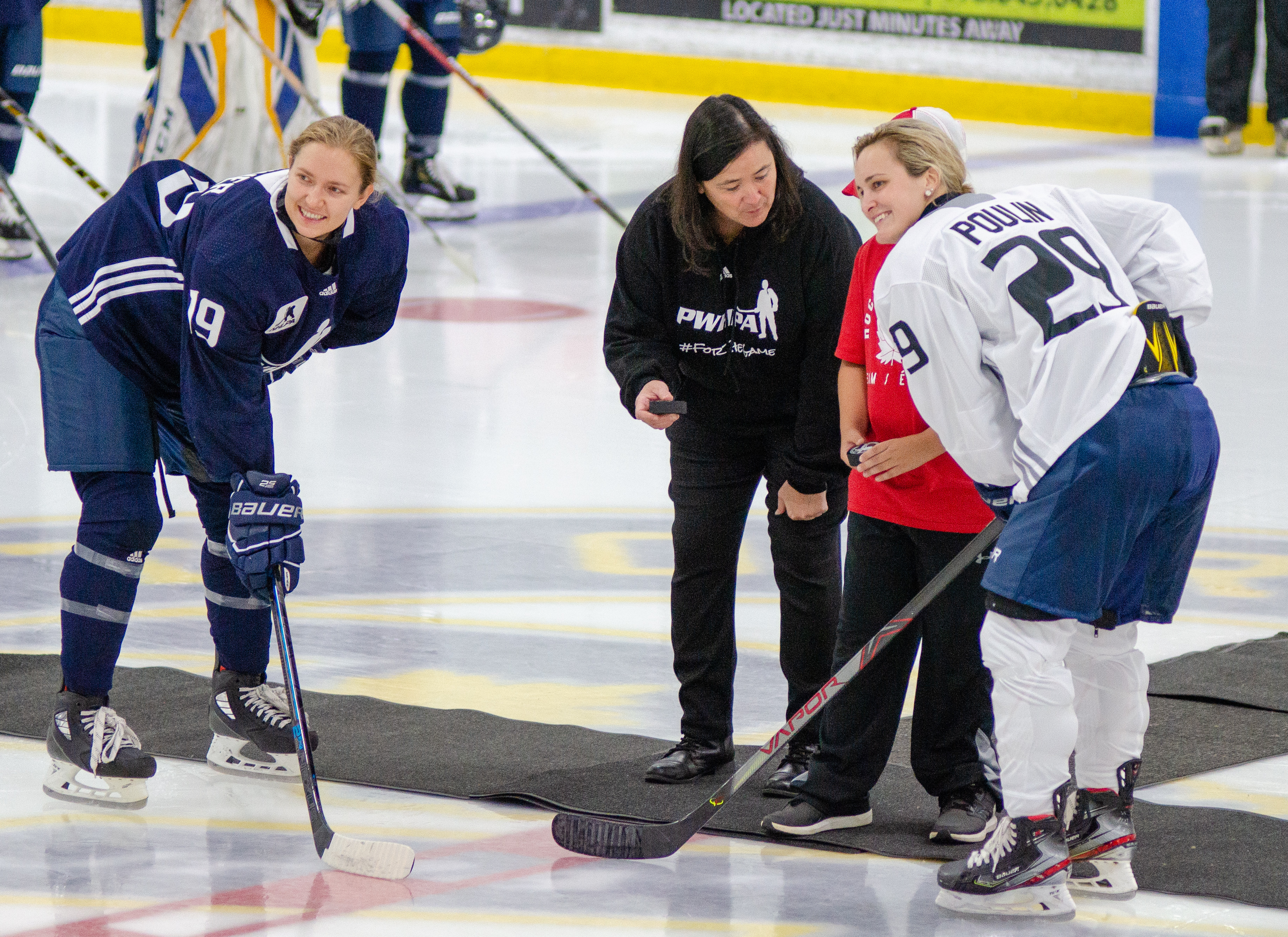
A ceremonial face-off during the 2019 Toronto Dream Gap tour stop. Vicky Sunohara dropping the puck between Brianne Jenner and Marie-Philip Poulin.

As the PWHPA worked towards its goal of establishing a new professional league, it organized Dream Gap tour "seasons" featuring exhibition matches between select PWHPA players competing for sponsorship and prize money. Seasons also frequently featured exhibition matches between PWHPA members and other teams, including games against NHL alumni.

In 2019, the PWHPA set up regional training hubs in Montreal, Mississauga, Markham, Calgary, Boston, Buffalo, Minnesota, and the Northeast United States, where players could practice multiple times a week. The PWHPA's first season, which lasted from September 2019 to March 2020, comprised a tour of showcase exhibition games; at each tour stop, teams were formed and named after team captains—e.g. the first showcase in Toronto featured teams captained by Rebecca Johnston, Brianne Jenner, Liz Knox, and Marie-Philip Poulin. The season was meant to include a stop in Japan with PWHPA players facing the Japanese national team; however, the tour was cancelled due to concerns about the COVID-19 pandemic.

Subsequent seasons featured more stable rosters based out of five training hubs and on teams named after sponsors. The second season was buoyed by a $1 million sponsorship agreement with Secret. It was played in regional hubs due to the ongoing pandemic, with three Canadian-based teams playing games in Calgary and two American-based teams making stops in three US cities. The third season occurred at the same time as national team players were centralized ahead of the 2022 Winter Olympics, meaning that many of the top PWHPA players were not available on tour; however, a team of PHWPA all-stars played a series of games against national teams, including Team Canada, Team USA, and Team Japan. The PWHPA also hosted a post-Olympics "Rivalry Rematch" between the Canadian and American teams in Pittsburgh.

For what proved to be the final season, four teams competed and for the first time accumulated points throughout the season in a bid for the championship, the Secret Cup. Teams were no longer based in regional hubs, with rosters constructed based on a new player-ranking system.

Dream Gap Tours
Season	Teams	Locations	Champion
2019–20	Various	Toronto (twice); Hudson, New Hampshire; Chicago; Philadelphia; Tempe, Arizona	None
2020–21	Team Adidas (Minnesota); Team Women's Sports Foundation (New Hampshire); Team Bauer (Montreal); Team Scotiabank (Calgary); Team Sonnet (Toronto)	New York City; Chicago; St. Louis; Calgary	Team Adidas (US); Team Bauer (Canada)
2021–22	Team Adidas (Minnesota); Team Bauer (Boston); Team Harvey's (Montreal); Team Scotiabank (Calgary); Team Sonnet (Toronto)	Truro, Nova Scotia; Toronto; Ottawa; Arlington, Virginia; Montreal	Various
2022–23	Team Adidas; Team Harvey's; Team Scotiabank; Team Sonnet	Montreal; Truro; Pittsburgh; Collingwood, Ontario; Southern Ontario; Tampa Bay; Arlington; Southern California	Team Harvey's
