= Secret (deodorant brand) =

Antiperspirant/deodorant for women by Procter & Gamble

- Product type: Women's deodorant
- Current owner: Procter & Gamble
- Country: United States
- Introduced: 1956; 70 years ago
- Markets: US, Canada and Mexico
- Tagline: Stress Tested for Women
- Website: secret.com

Secret is an antiperspirant/deodorant for women manufactured by Procter & Gamble. It is sold in the United States, Canada, and Mexico. Secret was launched as the first female deodorant in 1956, after more than 10 years of research that began in 1945. Secret is the only female brand antiperspirant/deodorant in Procter & Gamble's portfolio of products, which includes male brands Gillette and Old Spice.

There are more than 55 different antiperspirant/deodorant products sold under the Secret brand. Products are produced by company plants in Greensboro, North Carolina, and in Mexico City, Mexico, which are then distributed to retailers. Secret products are sold in a variety of channels, including supermarkets, drug stores and mass merchandisers. They are also available through various online retailers.

== History ==
Procter & Gamble began research on the product that would be Secret's first in 1945. In 1956, Secret was introduced as a cream that was applied with fingers to the underarm area for underarm odor control. It was the first antiperspirant/deodorant product made for, and marketed to, women. In 1958, Secret introduced a roll-on product, with a spray following in 1964. The solid round stick version was launched in 1978.

During the 1950s and 1960s, TV commercials featured a woman named Katy Winters (played by actress Anne Starr Roberts), a pert brunette whose friends all perspired a lot, whereupon she would recommend Secret as the solution to their problem. The ads were so ubiquitous (and repetitious) that eventually such comedians as Johnny Carson and George Carlin routinely mocked them.

Early product innovations were driven by the principle that men and women may have different needs when it comes to odor protection, but women should never have to compromise on efficacy. The slogan “Strong Enough for a Man, Made for a Woman” was developed in 1972 and grew to become one of Secret's most famous advertising tag lines. The woman who coined the slogan, Carol H Williams, would in time be inducted into the American Advertising Federation Hall of Fame.

=== The 1980s ===
During the 1980s, Secret adapted the solid antiperspirant/deodorant from a round stick to a wide stick in order to better fit under a woman's arm. Secret also introduced three new scents: Powder Fresh, Spring Breeze and Sporty Clean, to meet growing consumer demand for a variety of scents. By the end of the 1980s, Secret was the leading women's deodorant brand in dollar sales.

=== The 1990s ===
The 1990s brought more innovations with the launch of Ultra Dry and Sheer Dry. These products were proven to provide more strength and protection than previous versions. In 1999, Secret introduced Platinum Soft Solid, the strongest over-the-counter form of antiperspirant/deodorant protection available at the time.

=== The 2000s ===
Secret continued product line expansion in the new millennium. Starting in 2001, three new scents were added: Ambitious, Genuine and Optimism. This was followed by the 2002 launches of Secret Platinum Clear Gel and Secret Invisible Solid, with a micronized formula that goes on clear.

In 2007, Procter & Gamble introduced Secret Clinical Strength, the first product from Secret promising clinical strength wetness protection without a prescription.

In 2008, Secret's scientists developed Secret Flawless, a wetness improvement over the formula featured in their Platinum line. Secret Flawless features proprietary scent renewing technology and movement-activated protection.

In 2009, Scent Expressions was launched and featured 11 unique scents. This line of Secret products was designed to meet growing consumer interest in scent-based deodorants. Also launched was the brand's first waterproof deodorant, Secret Clinical Strength Waterproof.

In 2010, Secret was one of several brands featured in Procter & Gamble's sponsorship of the 2010 Winter Olympics. The “Thank you Mom” campaign featured athletes and their mothers. Secret worked with Tanith Belbin, Allison Baver and Allison Baver's mother. Secret launched an online campaign, “Let Her Jump,” which promoted making women's ski jumping an official Olympic sport.

2010 marked Secret's first time working directly with its Facebook fans to name a future product in the Scent Expressions line. In August, Secret launched 3 body splashes within the Scent Expressions line and 2 body mists within Fresh Effects, the brand's first foray into the non-aerosol body spray form.

In 2019, Secret launched a new collection, Secret with Essential Oils.

Secret entered a partnership with the U.S. women's national soccer team that spanned the year 2019.

=== The 2020s ===
In the 2020s, Secret continued partnerships with sporting organizations, and is the "Official Deodorant of Team USA" for the 2024 Summer Olympics. Ilona Maher became a brand ambassador for Secret in 2024.

== Media presence ==
In 2009, Facebook and Nielsen collaborated to provide opt-in polls on Facebook's homepage for brands to collect consumer attitudes and purchasing intent. Within a short amount of time, Procter & Gamble saw over 400,000 users become fans of the Secret deodorant page. Of those who responded to the poll, 11 percent were “extremely likely” to purchase.
