= 2010–11 United States women's national ice hockey team =

National sports team season

The 2010–11 women's national hockey team represented the United States in various tournaments during the season. The team won the gold medal at the Women's World Championships. The head coach of the National team was Mark Johnson.

== Offseason ==
- On September 22, 2010, Olympic silver medallist Jinelle Zaugg and current US goaltender Jessie Vetter threw out the ceremonial first pitch at Miller Park before the Milwaukee Brewers/Cincinnati Reds game.

== News and notes ==
- On December 16, 2010, former USA Hockey player Karyn Bye was selected to the International Ice Hockey Federation Hall of Fame Class of 2011.
- January 19, 2011: The city of Burlington, Vermont has been selected to host the 2012 IIHF Women's World Ice Hockey championships.
- March 25, 2011: Jinelle Zaugg announced her retirement from the U.S. Women's National Program.

== Senior team ==
The first tournament for the US team in the season will be the 2010 Four Nations Cup.

=== Four Nations Cup ===
| Date | Opponent | Location | Time | Score | Goal scorers |
| Fri Nov 5 | Sweden | Brunswick, Maine | 7 pm | USA 4-1 Sweden | Jinelle Zaugg-Siergiej (2), Caitlin Cahow, Allie Thunstrom |
| Tues Nov 9 | Canada | St. John's, Newfoundland | 6 pm | USA 3-2 Canada(Shootout) | US: Jenny Potter, Meghan Duggan; Can: Marie-Philip Poulin, Meaghan Mikkelson |
| Wed Nov 10 | Finland | St. John's, Nfld | 6 pm | USA 4-0 Finland | Jocelyne Lamoureux, Brianne Decker, Meghan Duggan (2) |
| Fri Nov 12 | Sweden | St. John's, Nfld | 11:30 am | USA 4-0 Sweden | Hilary Knight, Kacey Bellamy, Monique Lamoureux, Erika Lawler |
| Sat Nov 13 | Canada (gold-medal game) | St. John's, Nfld | 7:30 pm | USA 2-3 Canada (OT) | Julie Chu, Kendall Coyne |

==== Roster ====
| Number | Name | Position | Height | Club |
| 1 | Molly Schaus | G | 5-8 | Boston College Eagles |
| 31 | Jessie Vetter | G | 5-8 | USA National Team |
| 22 | Kacey Bellamy | D | 5-8 | USA National Team |
| 8 | Caitlin Cahow | D | 5-4 | USA National Team |
| 9 | Molly Engstrom | D | 5-9 | USA National Team |
| | Meagan Mangene | D | 5-6 | Boston College Eagles |
| | Michelle Picard | D | 5-6 | Noble and Greenough School/Massachusetts Spitfires U19 |
| | Josephine Pucci | D | 5-8 | Harvard Crimson |
| | Anne Schleper | D | 5-10 | Minnesota Golden Gophers |
| 13 | Julie Chu | F | 5-8 | USA National Team |
| | Kendall Coyne | F | 5-2 | Berkshire School |
| | Brianna Decker | F | 5-4 | Wisconsin |
| 10 | Meghan Duggan | F | 5-9 | Wisconsin |
| | Sarah Erickson | F | 5-7 | Minnesota |
| | Amanda Kessel | F | 5-6 | Minnesota |
| 21 | Hilary Knight | F | 5-10 | Wisconsin |
| 17 | Jocelyne Lamoureux | F | 5-6 | North Dakota |
| 7 | Monique Lamoureux | F | 5-6 | North Dakota |
| | Erika Lawler | F | 5-0 | USA National Team |
| | Jenny Potter | F | 5-4 | Usa National Team |
| | Haley Skarupa | F | 5-5 | Washington Pride U19 |
| | Allie Thunstrom | F | 5-5 | Boston College |

=== Holiday Camp ===
- Forty players were invited take part in the 2010 USA Hockey Women's Winter Training Camp. The camp was held from December 26 to 31 in Blaine, Minnesota. The six-day camp will serve as a tryout and training session for the U.S. Women's National Team. The coaching staff for the camp includes Katey Stone, head coach at Harvard University, Mark Hudak, head coach at Dartmouth College, and Hilary Witt, women's ice hockey assistant coach at Northeastern.
- December 21: Freshman goaltender Kerrin Sperry of the Boston University Terriers women's ice hockey program has been added to the roster for the 2010 USA Hockey Women's Winter Training Camp.

==== Roster ====
| Name | Position | Height | Club |
| Brianne McLaughlin | G | 5-8 | USA National Team |
| Alex Rigsby | G | 5-7 | Wisconsin Badgers |
| Molly Schaus | G | 5-8 | Boston College Eagles |
| Jessie Vetter | G | 5-8 | USA National Team |
| Kacey Bellamy | D | 5-8 | USA National Team |
| Blake Bolden | D | 5-6 | Boston College |
| Caitlin Cahow | D | 5-4 | USA National Team |
| Molly Engstrom | D | 5-9 | USA National Team |
| Marissa Gedman | D | 5-9 | Harvard Crimson |
| Kelly Jaminski | D | 6-0 | Wisconsin Badgers |
| Meagan Mangene | D | 5-6 | Boston College Eagles |
| Geena Prough | D | 5-2 | Wisconsin Badgers |
| Josephine Pucci | D | 5-8 | Harvard Crimson |
| Rachel Ramsey | D | 6-0 | Minnetonka High School |
| Angela Ruggiero | D | 5-9 | Boston Blades |
| Anne Schleper | D | 5-10 | Minnesota Golden Gophers |
| Sasha Sherry | D | 6-0 | Princeton Tigers |
| Brittany Ammerman | F | 5-6 | Wisconsin Badgers |
| Brooke Ammerman | F | 5-8 | Wisconsin Badgers |
| Kate Bacon | F | 5-6 | Providence Friars |
| Julie Chu | F | 5-8 | USA National Team |
| Kendall Coyne | F | 5-2 | Berkshire School |
| Brianna Decker | F | 5-4 | Wisconsin |
| Meghan Duggan | F | 5-9 | Wisconsin |
| Sarah Erickson | F | 5-7 | Minnesota |
| Amanda Kessel | F | 5-6 | Minnesota |
| Hilary Knight | F | 5-10 | Wisconsin |
| Jocelyne Lamoureux | F | 5-6 | North Dakota |
| Monique Lamoureux | F | 5-6 | North Dakota |
| Erika Lawler | F | 5-0 | USA National Team |
| Jenny Potter | F | 5-4 | USA National Team |
| Haley Skarupa | F | 5-5 | Washington Pride U19 |
| Allie Thunstrom | F | 5-5 | Boston College |

=== IIHF World Championships ===
The USA Women's National Team will attempt to repeat as gold medal winners as they compete in the 2011 Women's World Ice Hockey Championships in Switzerland. A total of 30 players were invited to the selection training camp in Ann Arbor, Michigan, from April 4–12, with the final 21-player roster set for the USA Women's National Team to be announced on April 9. Also USA will play a pair of games against Canada on April 7 and 8 in Michigan. Hilary Knight (Hanover, N.H.) scored the game-winning goal at 7:48 of overtime as the U.S. Women’s National Team won its third consecutive world title with a 3-2 overtime victory against Canada at the 2011 International Ice Hockey Federation World Women's Championship at Hallenstadion. Jessie Vetter made 51 saves in the championship-winning effort.

==== Notes ====
- On the 30 player preliminary roster, Alexandra Carpenter is the youngest player on the roster. The only players who have not competed in an Olympics, World Championship or World U18 Championship are Josephine Pucci and Jen Schoullis. Katey Stone will serve as the head coach and will be assisted by Mark Hudak from Dartmouth and Hilary Witt of Northeastern.

==== Roster ====
| Number | Position | Name | Height | 2011 Club |
| 29 | Goaltender | Brianne McLaughlin | 5-8 | N/A |
| 1 | Goaltender | Molly Schaus | 5-8 | Boston College |
| 31 | Goaltender | Jessie Vetter | 5-8 | N/A |
| 22 | Defense | Kacey Bellamy | 5-8 | Boston Blades |
| 8 | Defense | Caitlin Cahow | 5-4 | Boston Blades |
| 9 | Defense | Molly Engstrom | 5-9 | Brampton Thunder |
| 24 | Defense | Josephine Pucci | 5-8 | Harvard University |
| 4 | Defense | Angela Ruggiero | 5-9 | Boston Blades |
| 15 | Defense | Anne Schleper | 5-10 | Minnesota |
| 13 | Forward | Julie Chu | 5-8 | Montreal Stars |
| 26 | Forward | Kendall Coyne | 5-2 | Berkshire School |
| 14 | Forward | Brianna Decker | 5-4 | Wisconsin |
| 10 | Forward | Meghan Duggan | 5-9 | Wisconsin |
| 21 | Forward | Hilary Knight | 5-10 | Wisconsin |
| 17 | Forward | Jocelyne Lamoureux | 5-6 | North Dakota |
| 7 | Forward | Monique Lamoureux | 5-6 | North Dakota |
| 19 | Forward | Gigi Marvin | 5-8 | Minnesota Whitecaps |
| 12 | Forward | Jenny Potter | 5-4 | Minnesota Whitecaps |
| 3 | Forward | Jen Schoullis | 5-9 | University of Minnesota |
| 16 | Forward | Kelli Stack | 5-5 | Boston College |
| 27 | Forward | Kelley Steadman | 5-11 | Mercyhurst College |

==== Schedule ====
- All times local (CEST/UTC+2)

| April 17, 2011; 12:00 | United States | 5 – 0 (0–0, 2–0, 3–0) | Slovakia | Hallenstadion; Attendance: 585 |

Game reference

Brianne McLaughlin
Goalies
Zuzana Tomčíková
Referee:
(Canada) Melanie Bordeleau

| K. Coyne (M. Engstrom, H. Knight) – 23:50 | 1–0 |
| J. Pucci (J. Lamoureux) – 28:18 | 2–0 |
| H. Knight (B. Decker, C. Cahow) – 40:11 | 3–0 |
| M. Duggan (J. Chu) – 40:19 | 4–0 |
| B. Decker (H. Knight, K. Bellamy) – 47:27 | 5–0 |

10 min
Penalties
6 min
63
Shots
10

| April 18, 2011; 16:00 | Russia | 1 – 13 (0–5, 1–3, 0–5) | United States | Hallenstadion; Attendance: 535 |

Game reference

Valentina Ostrovlyanchik
Goalies
Molly Schaus
Referee:
(Germany) Nicole Hertrich

| | 0–1 | 07:03 – H. Knight (M. Duggan, J. Chu) (PP) |
| | 0–2 | 09:35 – A. Schleper (K. Coyne, B. Decker) |
| | 0–3 | 10:42 – J. Chu (J. Schmidgall-Potter) |
| | 0–4 | 12:14 – A. Ruggiero (B. Decker) |
| | 0–5 | 15:21 – M. Duggan (SH) |
| | 0–6 | 26:20 – C. Cahow (H. Knight, K. Coyne) (PP) |
| | 0–7 | 31:33 – H. Knight (M. Duggan, J. Chu) (PP) |
| | 0–8 | 31:56 – B. Decker (H. Knight) |
| Y. Lebedeva (S. Terentieva) – 39:59 | 1–8 |
| | 1–9 | 46:41 – H. Knight (J. Chu, M. Duggan) (PP) |
| | 1–10 | 48:07 – K. Stack (G. Marvin, K. Steadman) |
| | 1–11 | 50:35 – K. Coyne (H. Knight, M. Engstrom) |
| | 1–12 | 51:55 – K. Bellamy (K. Stack, G. Marvin) |
| | 1–13 | 55:40 – A. Ruggiero (B. Decker, G. Marvin) (PP) |

18 min
Penalties
20 min
20
Shots
57

| April 20, 2011; 20:00 | United States | 9 – 1 (4–0, 5–0, 0–1) | Sweden | Deutweg rink Attendance: 748 |

Game reference

Jessie Vetter
Goalies
Sara Grahn
Kim Martin
Referee:
(Finland) Ulla Sipila

| K. Stack (B. Decker) (PP) – 05:02 | 1–0 |
| J. Schoullis (K. Steadman, J. Schmidgall-Potter) – 08:48 | 2–0 |
| M. Lamoureux-Kolls (J. Lamoureux, K. Stack) – 11:30 | 3–0 |
| J. Schmidgall-Potter (J. Chu, H. Knight) – 19:54 | 4–0 |
| M. Duggan (H. Knight) (PP) – 23:34 | 5–0 |
| J. Schoullis (J. Schmidgall-Potter) – 27:09 | 6–0 |
| K. Coyne (C. Cahow) – 31:00 | 7–0 |
| J. Lamoureux (M. Lamoureux-Kolls) – 33:10 | 8–0 |
| M. Duggan (J. Chu, A. Schleper) – 39:10 | 9–0 |
| | 9–1 | 43:28 – E. Grahm (E. Holst, G. Andersson) (PP) |

8 min
Penalties
10 min
51
Shots
17

== Under 22 team ==
The team will participate in both the 2010 USA Hockey Women's National Festival and the 2010 Under-22 Series. The Women's National Festival will run from August 13–21 at the Olympic Center in Lake Placid, N.Y. The U-22 team will depart the Festival early and travel to Toronto to compete in the three-game Under-22 Series against Canada from August 18–21.

=== Roster ===
| Number | Name | Position | Height | Club |
| 1 | Lauren Dahm | G | 5'6" | Clarkson |
| 35 | Alyssa Grogan | G | 5'6" | Minnesota |
| 2 | Kasey Boucher | D | 5'7" | Boston University |
| 3 | Kelly Wild | D | 5'3" | Ohio State University |
| 5 | Anne Schleper | D | 5'10" | Minnesota |
| 9 | Megan Bozek | D | 5'9" | Minnesota |
| 11 | Montana Vichorek | D | 5'7" | Bemidji State |
| 25 | Sasha Sherry | D | 6'0" | Providence |
| 22 | Amber Yung | D | 5'10" | Minnesota |
| 28 | Josephine Pucci | D | 5'8" | Harvard |
| 7 | Monique Lamoureux | D | 5'6" | Minnesota |

=== Team Canada series ===
| Date | Score | USA scorers |
| Aug. 18 | USA 4-1 Canada | Monique Lamoureux |
| Aug. 19 | USA 6-5 Canada (shootout) | Brianna Decker, Monique Lamoureux (2), Hilary Knight (2) |
| Aug. 21 | USA 7-2 Canada | Amanda Kessel, Kendall Coyne |

== Under 18 team ==
- Scoring leaders 2011 IIHF World Women's U18 Championship

| Player | GP | G | A | Pts | +/− | PIM | POS |
|---|---|---|---|---|---|---|---|
| (United States) Alex Carpenter | 5 | 6 | 4 | 10 | +4 | 0 | FW |
| (United States) Hannah Brandt | 5 | 5 | 5 | 10 | +11 | 2 | FW |
| (United States) Amanda Pelkey | 5 | 4 | 6 | 10 | +9 | 2 | FW |
| (United States) Emily Field | 5 | 4 | 5 | 9 | +8 | 0 | FW |
| (United States) Haley Skarupa | 5 | 3 | 5 | 8 | +5 | 0 | FW |
| (United States) Layla Marvin | 5 | 6 | 1 | 7 | +9 | 2 | FW |

GP = Games played; G = Goals; A = Assists; Pts = Points; +/− = Plus/minus; PIM = Penalties in minutes; POS = Position

== 2011 Winter Universiade ==
=== Team roster ===
Following is the 2011 United States Women's National University Team, which will be representing the United States in the ice hockey competition:

| No. | Pos. | Name | Height | Weight | Birthdate | Birthplace | Year | 2010–11 team |
|---|---|---|---|---|---|---|---|---|
| 1 | G | Katie Vaughn | 5 ft 6 in (168 cm) | 120 lb (54 kg) | 27 September 1992 | Pittsburgh, PA | Freshman | Penn State University |
| 30 | G | Heather Rossi | 5 ft 6 in (168 cm) | 160 lb (73 kg) | 29 April 1988 | Kunkletown, PA | Senior | Penn State University |
| 3 | D | Shea Crawford | 5 ft 5 in (165 cm) | 140 lb (64 kg) | 30 April 1988 | Selbyville, DE | Senior | Lindenwood University |
| 4 | D | Megan Winters | 5 ft 10 in (178 cm) | 150 lb (68 kg) | 1 September 1990 | Basking Ridge, NJ | Sophomore | Northeastern University |
| 5 | D | Christina Young | 5 ft 5 in (165 cm) | 168 lb (76 kg) | 30 May 1989 | Stafford, VA | Senior | Michigan State University |
| 6 | D | Lindsay Reihl | 5 ft 7 in (170 cm) | 135 lb (61 kg) | 23 September 1991 | Cheshire, CT | Sophomore | Penn State University |
| 7 | D | Becky Katz | 5 ft 6 in (168 cm) | 145 lb (66 kg) | 24 November 1990 | Cambridge, MN | Sophomore | Robert Morris University (Illinois) |
| 8 | D | Nicole Konsdorf | 5 ft 4 in (163 cm) | 130 lb (59 kg) | 18 June 1989 | Freeland, MI | Junior | Lindenwood University |
| 9 | D | Rachel Black | 5 ft 3 in (160 cm) | 130 lb (59 kg) | 9 May 1989 | Redwood City, CA | Junior | Robert Morris University (Illinois) |
| 10 | F | Denise Rohlik | 5 ft 5 in (165 cm) | 130 lb (59 kg) | 5 May 1990 | Raleigh, NC | Junior | Penn State University |
| 11 | F | Erica Wynn | 5 ft 10 in (178 cm) | 130 lb (59 kg) | 31 March 1991 | Anchorage, AK | Sophomore | Lindenwood University |
| 12 | F | Justine Ducie | 5 ft 6 in (168 cm) | 135 lb (61 kg) | 29 June 1989 | Sandwich, MA | Senior | University of Rhode Island |
| 14 | F | Terra Payne | 5 ft 5 in (165 cm) | 150 lb (68 kg) | 14 September 1988 | Gaylord, MI | Senior | Michigan State University |
| 15 | F | Emily Nelson | 5 ft 4 in (163 cm) | 160 lb (73 kg) | 8 September 1989 | Harper Woods, MI | Senior | University of Michigan |
| 16 | F | Allysson Arcibal | 5 ft 4 in (163 cm) | 160 lb (73 kg) | 13 March 1992 | Vista, CA | Freshman | Lindenwood University |
| 17 | F | Tiffany Juha | 5 ft 2 in (157 cm) | 130 lb (59 kg) | 11 April 1988 | Cape Coral, FL | Senior | California University of Pennsylvania |
| 18 | F | Samantha Redick | 5 ft 7 in (170 cm) | 145 lb (66 kg) | 20 February 1992 | Anchorage, AK | Freshman | Lindenwood University |
| 19 | F | Ramey Weaver | 5 ft 2 in (157 cm) | 135 lb (61 kg) | 14 October 1989 | Eagle River, AK | Junior | Robert Morris University (Illinois) |
| 20 | F | Chelsea Minnie | 5 ft 6 in (168 cm) | 140 lb (64 kg) | 24 March 1992 | St. Clair, MI | Freshman | Grand Valley State University |
| 21 | F | Ashley Rumsey | 5 ft 8 in (173 cm) | 160 lb (73 kg) | 28 September 1988 | West Olive, MI | Senior | Grand Valley State University |
| 23 | F | Shelby Kucharski | 5 ft 2 in (157 cm) | 130 lb (59 kg) | 31 May 1991 | Livonia, MI | Sophomore | Grand Valley State University |
| 25 | F | Charlotte Hoium | 5 ft 7 in (170 cm) | 140 lb (64 kg) | 10 June 1990 | Falcon Heights, MN | Junior | Michigan State University |
| A | G | Michelle Wyniemko | 5 ft 4 in (163 cm) | 113 lb (51 kg) | 21 November 1990 | Westland, MI | Junior | Grand Valley State University |
| A | D | Kate Christofferson | 5 ft 3 in (160 cm) | 130 lb (59 kg) | 11 January 1991 | Trumbull, CT | Sophomore | Penn State University |
| A | D | Sarah Jensen | 5 ft 4 in (163 cm) | 150 lb (68 kg) | 26 November 1988 | Albert Lea, MN | Senior | South Dakota State University |
| A | F | Kayleigh Bowers | 5 ft 6 in (168 cm) | 145 lb (66 kg) | 11 January 1990 | Fort Worth, TX | Junior | Michigan State University |
| A | F | Alex Kann | 5 ft 3 in (160 cm) | 135 lb (61 kg) | 16 October 1991 | Phoenix, AZ | Freshman | Michigan State University |

A - Alternate

=== Round-robin results ===
| Team | GP | W | OTW | OTL | L | GF | GA | DIF | PTS |
|---|---|---|---|---|---|---|---|---|---|
| Canada | 5 | 4 | 1 | 0 | 0 | 39 | 1 | +38 | 14 |
| Finland | 5 | 4 | 0 | 1 | 0 | 49 | 3 | +46 | 13 |
| Slovakia | 5 | 3 | 0 | 0 | 2 | 33 | 11 | +22 | 9 |
| United States | 5 | 2 | 0 | 0 | 3 | 25 | 18 | +7 | 6 |
| Great Britain | 5 | 1 | 0 | 0 | 4 | 11 | 36 | -25 | 3 |
| Turkey | 5 | 0 | 0 | 0 | 5 | 0 | 88 | -88 | 0 |

| January 27, 2011; 9:30 | United States | 1 – 5 (0–2, 1–1, 0–2) | Slovakia | 500 Ice Rink, Erzurum |

Game reference

| January 28, 2011; 11:00 | United States | 15 - 0 (8–0, 5–0, 2-0) | Turkey | 500 Ice Rink, Erzurum |

Game reference

| January 30, 2011; 15:00 | Finland | 3 - 1 (0-0, 2-0, 1-1) | United States | 500 Ice Rink, Erzurum |

Game reference

| January 31, 2010; 11:00 | United States | 0 - 9 (0-3, 0-4, 0-2) | Canada | 500 Ice Rink, Erzurum |

Game reference

| February 2, 2011; 12:30 | Great Britain | 1 - 8 (0-2, 1-3, 0-3) | United States | 3000 Ice Rink, Erzurum |

Game reference

==== Semifinals ====
| February 4, 2011; 20:00 | Canada | 8 – 1 (2-1, 3-0, 3-0) | United States | 3000 Ice Rink, Erzurum |

Game reference

== Awards and honors ==
- Directorate Award: Best Defenseman, 2011 IIHF World Women's U18 Championship, Milica McMillen
- Directorate Award: Best Forward, 2011 IIHF World Women's U18 Championship, Alex Carpenter

== See also ==
- 2009–10 United States women's national ice hockey team
- United States women's national ice hockey team
