= 2011–12 United States women's national ice hockey team =

National sports team season

The 2011–12 women's national hockey team represents the United States in various tournaments during the season. The team attempted to win the gold medal at the Women's World Championships in Burlington, Vermont. The head coach of the National team is Mark Johnson.

== Senior team ==
=== 2011 IIHF Eight Nations Tournament ===
==== Schedule ====
Date	Teams	Result	Notes
August 24	USA vs. Russia	12-0	Hilary Knight scored a hat trick
August 25	USA vs. Japan	13-0	Kelli Stack and Jen Schoullis each scored a hat trick
August 27	USA vs. Switzerland		
August 28	USA vs. Canada		
August 30	USA vs. Sweden		
August 31	USA vs. Finland		

=== IIHF Worlds ===
In preparation for the 2012 IIHF Women's World Championship, the National Team played Canada in Ottawa, Ontario on March 31.

==== Exhibition ====
Date	Arena	Opponent	Score	Goal scorers	Notes
March 31, 2012	Ottawa Civic Centre	United States women's national ice hockey team	1-0	None	Laura Fortino scored her first international goal for Canada

==== Roster ====
Position	Number	Name	Height	Shoots	Team
G	29	Brianne McLaughlin	5-8	L	
G	1	Molly Schaus	5-9	L	Boston Blades (CWHL)
G	31	Jessie Vetter	5-8	L	
D	22	Kacey Bellamy	5-8	L	Boston Blades (CWHL)
D	25	Megan Bozek	5-9	R	Minnesota (WCHA)
D	11	Lisa Chesson	5-7	L	
D	19	Gigi Marvin	5-8	R	Boston Blades (CWHL)
D	23	Michelle Picard	5-6	L	Harvard (ECAC)
D	24	Josephine Pucci	5-8	R	Harvard University (ECACH)
D	15	Anne Schleper	5-10	L	University of Minnesota (WCHA)
F	20	Hannah Brandt	5-8	R	Hill-Murray School (Minn.)
F	13	Julie Chu	5-8	R	Montreal Stars (CWHL)
F	26	Kendall Coyne	5-2	L	Northeastern University (HEA)
F	14	Brianna Decker	5-4	R	Wisconsin (WCHA)
F	6	Jillian Dempsey	5-4	L	Harvard University (ECACH)
F	28	Amanda Kessel	5-6	R	University of Minnesota (WCHA)
F	21	Hilary Knight	5-10	R	Wisconsin (WCHA)
F	17	Jocelyne Lamoureux	5-6	R	North Dakota (WCHA)
F	7	Monique Lamoureux-Kolls	5-6	R	University of North Dakota (WCHA)
F	2	Erika Lawler	5-0	R	Boston Blades (CWHL)
F	12	Jenny Potter	5-4	L	Minnesota Whitecaps (WWHL)
F	16	Kelli Stack	5-5	R	Boston Blades (CWHL)
F	3	Taylor Wasylk	5-10	L	Boston College (Hockey East)

== Under 18 team ==
=== Exhibition ===
From August 18 to 21, the Under 18 team will compete versus Canada in a three game series at the Canadian International Hockey Academy in Rockland, Ontario.

Date	Score	Canada scorers	USA scorers
August 18	3-2 USA	Meghan Dufault (2)	Anne Pankowski, Kaliya Johnson, Paige Savage
August 19	3-2 Canada	Erin Ambrose, Rebecca Kohler, Nicole Connery	Alex Carpenter, Anne Pankowski
August 21	6-4 Canada	Laura Stacey (2), Meghan Dufault, Emily Clark, Rebecca Kohler, Cayley Mercer	Dana Trivigno, Sydney Daniels, Dani Cameranesi, Haley Skarupa
