= 2009–10 United States women's national ice hockey team =

2009–10 USA Hockey women's ice hockey season

Canada Cup champions Olympic silver medal IIHF Under 18 silver medal
- Conference: IIHF
- Home ice: World Arena, Colorado Springs

Record
- Overall: 12-7

Coaches and captains
- Head coach: Mark Johnson
- Assistant coaches: Dave Flint; Jodi McKenna
- Captain: Natalie Darwitz
- Alternate captain(s): Julie Chu, Jenny Potter, Angela Ruggiero

The 2009-10 Women's National Hockey team represented the United States at the 2010 Winter Olympic Games. The head coach was Mark Johnson from the University of Wisconsin. Assisting him were Dave Flint and Jodi McKenna.

== News and notes ==
- January 14, 2010: Two-time Olympian Natalie Darwitz will be the captain of the U.S. women's hockey team. Four-time Olympic veterans Angela Ruggiero and Jenny Potter will be alternate captains along with two-time Olympian Julie Chu. Darwitz was the American captain during the past two international seasons, leading the U.S. team to IIHF world championships in 2008 and 2009. The former University of Minnesota Golden Gopher has played in 197 games for the American team, scoring 231 points.
- January 20, 2010: Four-time Olympic hockey player Angela Ruggiero is among nine current and former athletes standing for election to become members of the IOC in Vancouver next month. The results will be announced on Feb. 24. The winning candidates will replace Pernilla Wiberg of Sweden and Manuela Di Centa of Italy, whose eight-year terms have ended. Ruggiero is seeking to become the third IOC member from the U.S., joining Jim Easton and Anita DeFrantz.
- January 25, 2010: Kerry Weiland and eight other members of the U.S. Women's Olympic hockey team shared tales of their childhood and dreams of their future with the students from University Avenue Elementary School in Blaine, Minnesota. In addition, the players joined forces with the U.S. Olympic Committee's Team for Tomorrow humanitarian relief fund to donate 15 digital cameras to the school, and contributed 25 laptops on behalf of USA Hockey.
- Heading into the 2010 Olympics, Angela Ruggiero holds the record for the number of hockey games played by any Team USA member, male or female.
- February 25: Angela Ruggiero was elected by her peers to represent all Olympic athletes on the International Olympic Committee Athletes Commission.
- April 19: Meghan Duggan threw the first pitch at a Boston Red Sox game before a sellout Patriots Day crowd of 37,609. Her teammates Erika Lawler, Jessie Vetter of Wisconsin, Brianne McLaughlin, Julie Chu, Karen Thatcher, Molly Schaus, Hilary Knight, and Caitlin Cahow were also on the mound when Duggan threw the pitch.
- April 20: The US team attended the opening reception for the United States Vancouver Olympic team Washington, D.C. celebration at the Sports Legends Museum at Camden Yards on April 20, 2010, in Baltimore, Maryland.

== Schedule ==
=== Qwest Tour ===
- Kelli Stack was named U.S. Player of the Game in the February 4th match against Finland.

Date	Opponent	Location	Time	Score
Oct. 5, 2009	Canada	Victoria, BC (Save on Foods Centre)	19:00 PM	1-3
Oct. 16, 2009	Canada	Spokane, WA (Spokane Arena)	19:00 PM	2-5
Dec. 12, 2009	Canada	Denver, CO (Magness Arena)	19:00	2-4
Dec. 15, 2009	Canada	Calgary, AB	19:30	2-6
Dec. 30, 2009	Canada	St. Paul, MN (Xcel Energy Center)	19:00 PM	1-2
Jan. 1, 2010	Canada	Ottawa, ON	19:30 PM	2-3 (Shootout)
Feb. 4, 2010	Finland	Colorado Springs, CO (World Arena)		5-1

==== Qwest Tour roster ====
Number	Name	Position	Height	Club
1	Molly Schaus	G	5'8"	Boston College
2	Erika Lawler	F	5'0"	Univ. of Wisconsin
4	Angela Ruggiero	D	5'9"	08-09 US Women's Team
5	Karen Thatcher	F	5'8"	08-09 US Women's Team
6	Rachael Drazan	D	5'6"	University of Minnesota
7	Monique Lamoureux	F	5'6"	Univ. of Minnesota
8	Caitlin Cahow	D	5'4"	08-09 US Women's Team
9	Molly Engstrom	D	5'9"	08-09 US Women's Team
10	Meghan Duggan	F	5'9"	Univ. of Wisconsin
11	Lisa Chesson	D	5'6"	08-09 US Women's Team
12	Jenny Potter	F	5'4"	08-09 US Women's Team
13	Julie Chu	F	5'8"	08-09 US Women's Team
15	Angie Keseley	F	5'7"	Univ. of Wisconsin
16	Kelli Stack	F	5'5"	Boston College
17	Jocelyne Lamoureux	F	5'6"	Univ. of Minnesota
19	Gigi Marvin	F	5'8"	Univ. of Minnesota
20	Natalie Darwitz	F	5'3"	08-09 US Women's Team
21	Hilary Knight	F	5'10"	Univ. of Wisconsin
22	Kacey Belamy	D	5'8"	Univ. of New Hampshire
23	Kerry Weiland	D	5'4"	08-09 US Women's Team
27	Jinelle Zaugg-Siergiej	F	5'4"	08-09 US Women's Team
29	Brianne McLaughlin	G	5'8"	Robert Morris University
31	Jessie Vetter	G	5'8"	Univ. of Wisconsin

=== 2009 Canada Cup ===
- All games were held at General Motors Place in Vancouver, British Columbia.

Date	Opponent	Time	Score
August 31, 2009	Finland	15:00 PM	Loss, 2-3
Sep 1, 2009	Sweden	15:00 PM	Win, 7-0
Sep 3, 2009	Canada	19:30 PM	Win, 4-2
Sep 5, 2009	Finland (semi-final)	15:00 PM	Win, 4-0
Sep 6, 2009	Canada (final)	19:30 PM	Win, 2-1

=== NCAA exhibition games ===
Throughout the season, various NCAA schools will play the United States Olympic Hockey team. In the game against Wisconsin, former Wisconsin player Jinelle-Zaugg-Siergiej netted a goal and had an assist as the Americans got the win.

Date	Location	NCAA school	Score
September 25	Xcel Energy Center; Saint Paul, Minnesota (Minnesota Wild)	WCHA All-Stars	USA, 6-1
September 26	National Hockey Center; St. Cloud, Minnesota (St. Cloud State University)	St. Cloud State	USA, 13-0
October 10	Ralph Engelstad Arena; Grand Forks, North Dakota (University of North Dakota)	North Dakota	USA, 11-1
November 22	Whittemore Center; Durham, New Hampshire (University of New Hampshire)	Hockey East All-Stars	USA, 4-0
January 3	TD Banknorth Sports Center; Hamden, Connecticut (Quinnipiac University)	ECAC All-Stars	8-2
January 5	Kohl Center; Madison, WI (University of Wisconsin–Madison)	Wisconsin	9-0
January 12	Ridder Arena; Minneapolis, MN (University of Minnesota)	Minnesota	8-5

=== Four Nations Cup ===
- All games to be held in Finland.

Date	Opponent	Location	Time	Score
Nov 3, 2009	Finland	Mikkeli	18:30 PM	4-0
Nov 4, 2009	Sweden	Vierumaki	18:30 PM	3-2
Nov 4, 2009	Canada	Vierumaki	18:30 PM	3-2
Nov 7, 2009	Canada (gold-medal game)	Tikkurila	20:00 PM	1-5

== 2010 Olympics ==
- December 17: At the Mall of America, in Bloomington, Minnesota, 21 players were named to the 2010 U.S. Olympic Women's Ice Hockey Team. Selections Jenny Potter and Angela Ruggiero will both be playing in their fourth Olympic Games in Vancouver. Hilary Knight is the youngest U.S. player at 20 years old, marking the first time that a U.S. Olympic Women's Ice Hockey Team will not include a teenager at the Games. Jocelyne and Monique Lamoureux will be the first set of twins ever to play hockey in the Olympics.

Overall, the roster includes 6 former Olympians, 8 players who have competed in the Western Women's Hockey League, and 19 returnees from the 2009 U.S. Women's National Team. From an NCAA perspective, 11 members of the team were NCAA Division I players in 2008-09, and 10 of the 11 participated in the 2009 NCAA tournament. Other NCAA facts include that 9 members were NCAA national champions, 7 were participants in the 2009 NCAA Women's Frozen Four, 4 were winners of the 2009 NCAA National Championship, and there are 3 Patty Kazmaier Memorial Award recipients.

=== Final roster ===
- Rachel Drazan and Angie Keseley were not selected for the Olympic team.
- Angela Ruggiero and forward Jenny Potter are the only players who have been members of every US women's team since the inaugural Olympic tournament at the 1998 Games.
- Ruggiero will enter the Vancouver Olympics as the all-time leader in games played for Team USA.
- Jenny Potter is the only mother on Team USA. Her daughter Madison is eight, and son Cullen is two.

The following is the American roster in the women's ice hockey tournament of the 2010 Winter Olympics.

Head coach: (United States) Mark Johnson Assistant coaches: (United States) Dave Flint, (United States) Jodi McKenna

No.	Pos.	Name	Height	Weight	Birthdate	Birthplace	2009–10 team
1	G	Molly Schaus	174 cm (5 ft 9 in)	67 kg (148 lb)	July 29, 1988 (aged 21)	Natick, Massachusetts	Boston College Eagles
2	F	Erika Lawler	152 cm (5 ft 0 in)	59 kg (130 lb)	5 February 1987 (aged 23)	Fitchburg, Massachusetts	Wisconsin Badgers
4	D	Angela Ruggiero – A	175 cm (5 ft 9 in)	87 kg (192 lb)	3 January 1980 (aged 30)	Los Angeles, California	Harvard Crimson
5	F	Karen Thatcher	174 cm (5 ft 9 in)	74 kg (163 lb)	29 February 1984 (aged 25)	Blaine, Washington	Providence Friars
7	F	Monique Lamoureux	168 cm (5 ft 6 in)	71 kg (157 lb)	3 July 1989 (aged 20)	Grand Forks, North Dakota	North Dakota Fighting Sioux
8	D	Caitlin Cahow	163 cm (5 ft 4 in)	71 kg (157 lb)	20 May 1985 (aged 24)	New Haven, Connecticut	Harvard Crimson
9	D	Molly Engstrom	175 cm (5 ft 9 in)	81 kg (179 lb)	1 March 1983 (aged 26)	Siren, Wisconsin	Wisconsin Badgers
10	F	Meghan Duggan	175 cm (5 ft 9 in)	74 kg (163 lb)	3 September 1987 (aged 22)	Danvers, Massachusetts	Wisconsin Badgers
11	D	Lisa Chesson	169 cm (5 ft 7 in)	69 kg (152 lb)	18 August 1986 (aged 23)	Plainfield, Illinois	Ohio State Buckeyes
12	F	Jenny Potter – A	163 cm (5 ft 4 in)	66 kg (146 lb)	12 January 1979 (aged 31)	Edina, Minnesota	Minnesota Golden Gophers
13	F	Julie Chu – A	174 cm (5 ft 9 in)	67 kg (148 lb)	13 March 1982 (aged 27)	Bridgeport, Connecticut	Harvard Crimson
16	F	Kelli Stack	165 cm (5 ft 5 in)	59 kg (130 lb)	13 January 1988 (aged 22)	Brooklyn Heights, Ohio	Boston College Eagles
17	F	Jocelyne Lamoureux	168 cm (5 ft 6 in)	70 kg (150 lb)	3 July 1989 (aged 20)	Grand Forks, North Dakota	North Dakota Fighting Sioux
19	F	Gigi Marvin	174 cm (5 ft 9 in)	75 kg (165 lb)	7 March 1987 (aged 22)	Warroad, Minnesota	Minnesota Golden Gophers
20	F	Natalie Darwitz – C	160 cm (5 ft 3 in)	62 kg (137 lb)	13 October 1983 (aged 26)	Eagan, Minnesota	Minnesota Golden Gophers
21	F	Hilary Knight	178 cm (5 ft 10 in)	78 kg (172 lb)	12 July 1989 (aged 20)	Hanover, New Hampshire	Wisconsin Badgers
22	D	Kacey Bellamy	174 cm (5 ft 9 in)	65 kg (143 lb)	22 April 1987 (aged 22)	Westfield, Massachusetts	New Hampshire Wildcats
23	D	Kerry Weiland	163 cm (5 ft 4 in)	64 kg (141 lb)	18 October 1980 (aged 29)	Palmer, Alaska	Wisconsin Badgers
27	F	Jinelle Zaugg-Siergiej	183 cm (6 ft 0 in)	82 kg (181 lb)	27 March 1986 (aged 23)	Eagle River, Wisconsin	Wisconsin Badgers
29	G	Brianne McLaughlin	174 cm (5 ft 9 in)	59 kg (130 lb)	20 June 1987 (aged 22)	Sheffield, Ohio	Robert Morris Colonials
31	G	Jessie Vetter	174 cm (5 ft 9 in)	77 kg (170 lb)	19 December 1985 (aged 24)	Cottage Grove, Wisconsin	Wisconsin Badgers

=== Schedule ===
Date	Opponent	Location	Time	Score	Record
Feb. 14	China	UBC Thunderbird Arena	12:00 PM	12-1	1-0-0
Feb. 16	Russia	UBC Thunderbird Arena	14:30 PM	13-0	2-0-0
Feb. 18	Finland	UBC Thunderbird Arena	14:30 PM	6-0	3-0-0
Feb. 22	Sweden	Canada Hockey Place	12:00 PM	9-1	4-0-0
Feb. 25	Canada	Canada Hockey Place	15:30 PM	0-2	4-1-0

== Player stats ==
=== Skaters ===
Player	Goals	Assists	Points	PIM	Shots	+/-
Kacey Bellamy	0	1	1	4	2	7
Caitlin Cahow	1	2	3	10	7	5
Lisa Chesson	1	2	3	2	6	6
Julie Chu	2	1	3	0	3	2
Natalie Darwitz	5	9	14	0	22	9
Meghan Duggan	4	0	4	0	20	5
Molly Engstrom	4	3	7	6	15	13
Hilary Knight	2	4	6	0	12	5
Jocelyne Lamoureux	2	3	5	0	9	7
Monique Lamoureux	1	7	8	2	18	6
Erika Lawler	0	0	0	0	5	3
Gigi Marvin	0	4	4	2	14	9
Jenny Potter	6	3	9	2	13	+7
Angela Ruggiero	2	4	6	10	14	7
Kelli Stack	2	4	6	4	12	4
Karen Thatcher	3	2	5	2	12	5
Kerry Weiland	0	1	1	6	6	4
Jinelle Zaugg	0	0	0	2	6	3

=== Goaltenders ===
Player	Games played	Minutes	Goals against	Wins	Losses	Shutouts	Save %	Goals against Average
Brianne McLaughlin	1	8	0	0	0	0	100.00	0.00
Molly Schaus	1	52	1	1	0	0	.500	1.00
Jessie Vetter	4	239:50	2	3	1	3	96.6	0.50

== Under-18 team ==
=== Schedule ===
Date	Opponent	Score	Record	Notes
April 3	Canada (final)	4-5 (OT) Andrew Podnieks (April 4, 2010). "Campbell OT for Canadian gold". Toronto Star. Archived from the original on June 29, 2011.	4-1	Jessica Campbell scores overtime winner

== Awards and honors ==
- Media All-Star Team:
  - D – Angela Ruggiero
  - D – Molly Engstrom
  - F – Jenny Potter
- Directorate Awards were also announced:
- Best Defenceman: Molly Engstrom
- Under 18 team
  - Kendall Coyne Best Forward by the Directorate
  - Alex Rigsby, Best Goalie by the Directorate

== See also ==
- 2010–11 United States women's national ice hockey team
- United States women's national ice hockey team
