= 2010–11 Boston Blades season =

The 2010–11 Boston Blades season was the first in Boston Blades history. The Blades competed in the Canadian Women's Hockey League and attempted to win the Clarkson Cup.

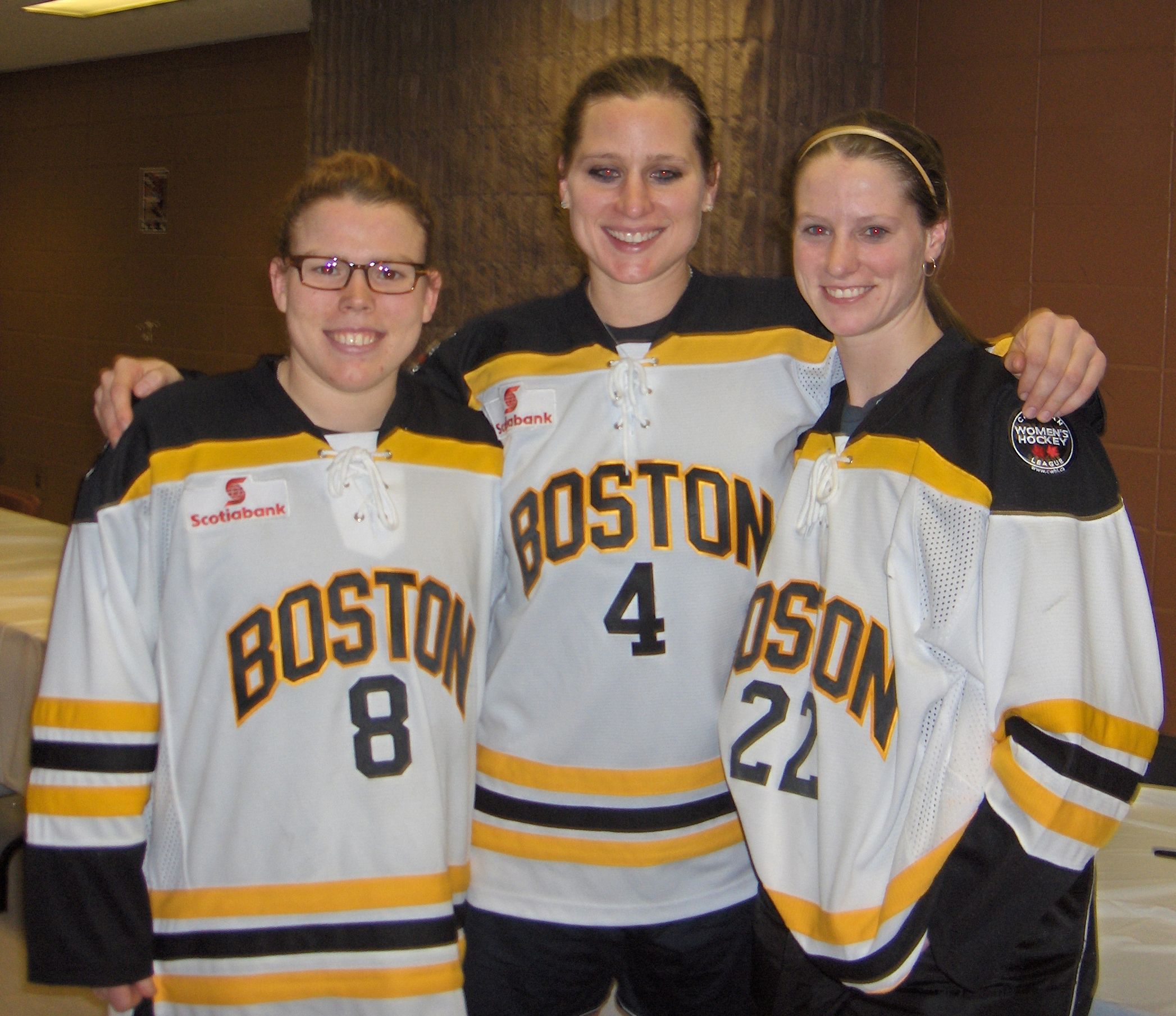
3 Defenders of Boston Blades play with USA National Team: # 8 Caitlyn Cahow, # 4 Angela Ruggiero and # 22 Kacey Bellamy

== Background ==
On August 12, 2010, the CWHL announced that the city of Boston would receive an expansion team for the 2010–11 CWHL season. The unnamed team will practice at Ristuccia Arena in Wilmington.

== Offseason ==
- September 17: Former New Hampshire goaltender Erin Whitten was named head coach of the Boston expansion franchise.
- September 27: Mariel Lacina was appointed as Assistant Coach. Prior to coaching, she was a goaltender for the Dartmouth Big Green women's ice hockey program.

== CWHL Draft ==
The Boston club was able to protect some players from being selected from their roster in the 2010 CWHL Draft.

=== Protected players ===
| Player | 2009-10 Team |
| Caitlin Cahow | 2009–10 United States women's national ice hockey team |
| Molly Engstrom | 2009–10 United States women's national ice hockey team Brampton Thunder |
| Melissa Haber | Boston University Terriers women's ice hockey |
| Cherie Hendrickson | Burlington Barracudas |
| Kacey Bellamy | 2009–10 United States women's national ice hockey team |

== Free agents ==
=== Protected players ===
| Player | College | 2009-10 Team |
| Danielle Ayearst | Mercyhurst | Vaughan Flames |
| Jaclyn Hawkins | Connecticut | ZSC Lions (Zurich, Switzerland) |
| Jessica Koizumi | Minnesota Duluth | Montreal Stars |
| Erika Lawler | Wisconsin | 2009–10 United States women's national ice hockey team |
| Shelley Payne | Colby College | Mississauga Chiefs |
| Angela Ruggiero | Harvard | 2009–10 United States women's national ice hockey team |
| Karen Thatcher | Providence College | 2009–10 United States women's national ice hockey team |

== Regular season ==
- December 19: The Blades came from behind to defeat Montreal. In doing so, they broke up Montreal's bid for an undefeated season. Boston goalie Mandy Cronin stopped 74 shots to lead Boston to victory. Montreal had an early 2-0 lead. In the 2nd period, Blades player Sam Faber scored on an assist by Jess Koizumi. In the third period, Koizumi would tie the game. With 3:24 to play in the game, Angela Ruggiero scored the game-winning goal. She was assisted by Sam Faber and Hayley Moore.
- January 16: Gillian Apps scored her seventh goal of the season 2:42 into overtime as Brampton defeated the Boston Blades by a 4-3 tally. The win was the fifth in a row for Brampton who are now 11-6 on the season. The five game win streak is currently the best in the league. Brampton has yet to lose a game in 2011. In addition, they have outscored their opponents 23-9 during the streak.
- February 5 & 6: a gallery of Toronto vs Boston games.
- February 11:Boston are a blast.
- February 12: Brampton tops Boston for tenth straight victory.
- February 13: Cherie Piper hat trick contributes to a Brampton season sweep over Boston.
- March 3: Boston Blades Team Up for Alzheimer Research: The Blades will be promoting at their games and hosting sign-up tables for those interested in riding, including at upcoming playoffs set for March 11–13.

=== Schedule ===
| Date | Opponent | Score | Record |
| October 30, 2010 | Burlington | 3-0 | 1–0–0 |
| October 31, 2010 | Burlington | 6-0 | 2–0–0 |
| November 20, 2010 | Burlington | 1-5 | 2-1-0 |
| November 21, 2010 | Toronto | 4-2 | 3-1-0 |
| November 27, 2010 | Montreal | 2-3 | 3–2–0 |
| November 28, 2010 | Montreal | 2-4 | 3–3–0 |
| December 4, 2010 | Burlington | 4-3 | 4–3–0 |
| December 5, 2010 | Burlington | 1-2 | 4–4–0 |
| December 11, 2010 | Toronto | 6-4 | 5-4-0 |
| December 12, 2010 | Toronto | 4-3 | 6–4–0 |
| December 18, 2010 | Montreal | 2-10 | 6–5–0 |
| December 19, 2010 | Montreal | 3-2 | 7–5–0 |
| January 8, 2011 | Brampton | 3-5 | 7–6–0 |
| January 9, 2011 | Toronto | 4-9 | 7–7–0 |
| January 15, 2011 | Brampton | 0-3 | 7–8–0 |
| January 16, 2011 | Brampton | 3-4 | 7–9–0 |
| January 22, 2011 | Burlington | 0-1 | 7–10–0 |
| January 23, 2011 | Brampton | 0-1 | 7–11–0 |
| January 29, 2011 | Montreal | 0-3 | 7–12–0 |
| January 30, 2011 | Montreal | 6-5 | 8–12–0 |
| February 5, 2011 | Toronto | 5-4 | 9–12–0 |
| February 6, 2011 | Toronto | 4-2 | 10–12–0 |
| February 12, 2011 | Brampton | 2-5 | 10–13–0 |
| February 13, 2011 | Brampton | 3-8 | 10–14–0 |
| February 26, 2011 | Montreal | 4-5 | 10–15–0 |
| February 27, 2011 | Montreal | 1-4 | 10–16–0 |

=== Standings ===
Note: GP = Games played, W = Wins, L = Losses, T = Ties, OTL = Overtime losses, GF = Goals for, GA = Goals against, Pts = Points.

February 28, 2011
| No. | Team | GP | W | L | OTL | GF | GA | Pts |
|---|---|---|---|---|---|---|---|---|
| 1 | Montreal | 26 | 22 | 2 | 2 | 125 | 70 | 46 |
| 2 | Brampton | 26 | 19 | 6 | 1 | 111 | 69 | 39 |
| 3 | Boston | 26 | 10 | 15 | 1 | 73 | 101 | 21 |
| 4 | Toronto | 26 | 8 | 13 | 5 | 83 | 98 | 21 |
| 5 | Burlington | 26 | 6 | 18 | 2 | 54 | 108 | 14 |

=== Attendance at Ristuccia Arena in Wilmington ===
total: 3471 supporters for 16 games, average: 216 supporters by game at domicile.

== Roster ==
Goalies
| Number | | Player | Former Team | Hometown |
|---|---|---|---|---|
| 33 | (United States) | Moe Bradley | Boston Shamrocks | Swampscott, Massachusetts |
| 30 | (United States) | Heather Heckman-Mckenna | JMH | Salem, New Hampshire |
| 1 | (United States) | Mandy Cronin | Brampton (CWHL) | York, Maine |

Defense
| Number | | Player | Former Team | Hometown |
|---|---|---|---|---|
| 26 | (Canada) | Brittany Simpson | Providence College | Barrie, Ontario |
| 24 | (United States) | Cherie Hendrickson | Burlington (CWHL) | Boxford, Massachusetts |
| 22 | (United States) | Kacey Bellamy | National Team USA | Westfield, Massachusetts |
| 8 | (United States) | Caitlyn Cahow | National Team USA | Branford, Connecticut |
| 6 | (Canada) | Erin Nomore | Provindence College | Cambridge, Ontario |
| 4 | (United States) | Angela Ruggiero | National Team USA | Panorama City, California |

Forwards
| Number | | Player | Former Team | Hometown |
|---|---|---|---|---|
| 91 | (United States) | Annie Hogan | Northeastern | Medford, Massachusetts |
| 56 | (United States) | Jess Koizumi | Montreal(CWHL) | Simi Valley, California |
| 28 | (United States) | Sami Faber | University Of New Hampshire | Chestwood, New York |
| 21 | (United States) | Cassie Sperry | Northeastern | Southake, Texas |
| 16 | (United States) | Micaela Long | University of New Hampshire | South Boston, Massachusetts |
| 13 | (United States) | Erika Lawler | National Team USA | Fitchburg, Massachusetts |
| 12 | (United States) | Samantha Rush | Holy Cross | Wakefied, Massachusetts |
| 10 | (United States) | Lindsay Berman | Northeastern | Odenton, Maryland |
| 9 | (United States) | Hayley Moore | Brown University | Wakefield, Massachusetts |
| 7 | (United States) | Shannon Sisk | University of New Hampshire | Plumsteadville, Pennsylvania |
| 5 | (United States) | Karen Thatcher | National Team USA | Blaine, Washington |
| 3 | (United States) | Liz Keady | Princeton university | Braintree, Massachusetts |

== Coaching staff ==
- Head Coach: Erin Whitten-Hamlen
- Assistant Coach: Mariel Lachina
- General Manager: Paul Hendrickson

== Postseason ==
Boston is eliminated and cannot participate in the Clarkson Cup Championship.

| Date | Opponent | Score | Attendance |
| March 11, 2011 | Toronto | Toronto wins 4-2 | 280 supporters |
| March 12, 2011 | Toronto | Toronto wins 3-1 | 184 supporters |
| March 13, 2011 | Toronto | a 3rd match is non-necessary . Toronto gains the first 2 matches | - |

== See also ==
- 2010–11 CWHL season
- 2011 Clarkson Cup
- Boston Blades
- Canadian Women's Hockey League
