= Kasey Boucher =

American ice hockey player (born 1990)

- Born: October 25, 1990 (age 35) Lewiston, Maine, U.S.
- Height: 5 ft 7 in (170 cm)
- Position: Defense
- Played for: Boston University; Boston Blades
- National team: United States
- Playing career: 2008–2013
Medal record
Women's ice hockey
Representing the United States
IIHF World Women's U18 Championships
Gold medal – first place	2008 Calgary	Team

Kasey Boucher (born October 25, 1990) is a women's ice hockey player and an alumnus of the North American Hockey Academy. Currently, she competes for the Boston University Terriers women's ice hockey program.

== Playing career ==
=== NCAA ===
Boucher appeared in 34 games in her freshman season (2008–09) and accumulated six points (all assists). For the season, she earned a +5 rating. In four of the final seven games of the season, she logged an assist, including an assist in three consecutive games (vs. Boston College on Feb. 14, at Northeastern on Feb. 21 and vs. Northeastern on Feb.22).

In the following season (2009–10), she participated in 38 games while accumulating 12 points (five goals, seven assists). On October 9, 2009, Boucher scored her first career goal and notched her first career multi-point game, as the Terriers defeated the Robert Morris Colonials by a 4–3 overtime tally. She scored a goal at New Hampshire on November 7 and registered the club's only goal in a 1–1 tie with Boston College on February 9.

During the 2010–11 season, Boucher only collected four points in the first five games of the season (1 goal, 3 assists). Boucher assisted on Marie-Philip Poulin's first NCAA goal (against North Dakota on October 3). Six days later, she assisted on Marie-Philip Poulin's goal against Union College. On October 15, Boucher scored a goal against Wayne State.

=== USA Hockey ===
Boucher won the inaugural IIHF Under 18 World championships with the United States in 2008. On November 22, 2009, Boucher played on the Hockey East All-Star Team that played the U.S. Women's National Team as part of the Qwest Tour.

== Career stats ==
=== NCAA ===
Year	GP	G	A	Pts	PPL	SHG	GWG	PIM
2008-09	34	0	6	6	0	0	0	2/4
2009-10	38	5	7	12	2	0	0	3/6
2010-11	38	4	10	14	2	0	1	2/4

==== Hockey East ====
Year	GP	G	A	Pts	PPL	SHG	GWG	PIM
2008-09	19	0	5	5	0	0	0	1/2
2009-10	21	2	3	5	1	0	0	2/4
2010-11	21	2	4	6	1	0	0	1/2

== Awards and honors ==
- North American Hockey Academy Coaches Award (earned in senior year)
- 2009 Hockey East All-Academic team
- 2009 Terriers Unsung Hero Award (shared with teammate Amanda Shaw)
- Hockey East Honor Roll (Oct. 12, 2009)
- Hockey East Honor Roll (Feb. 15, 2010)
- Member of the National Honor Society

- Hockey East Best Defender Award (2011–12)
