= Lauren Dahm =

American ice hockey goaltender (born 1989)

- Born: September 26, 1989 (age 36) Baldwinsville, New York, United States
- Height: 168 cm (5 ft 6 in)
- Position: Goaltender
- Played for: Worcester Blades; Boston Blades; Clarkson University
- Playing career: 2016–present

Lauren Dahm is an American ice hockey goaltender, currently a member of the PWHPA.

== Career ==
Across 4 seasons with Clarkson, Dahm finished with a .568 winning percentage, a 1.72 GAA and a .928 SV%.

After graduating, Dahm originally retired from hockey, but returned in 2016 to play for the Boston Blades of the CWHL. She was drafted by the team 56th overall that year. Despite the team often finishing at or near the bottom of the league in three years there, she quickly became one of the most recognisable Blades players, with one of the heaviest workloads of all CWHL goaltenders. She set the league record for most saves by a goaltender in their debut with 54 saves in her first game against the Toronto Furies.

After the CWHL folded, Dahm joined the PWHPA. She had previously turned down an invitation to the American national team during the players' boycott in 2017.
