= Angela Ruggiero =

American ice hockey player (born 1980)

- Hockey Hall of Fame, 2015
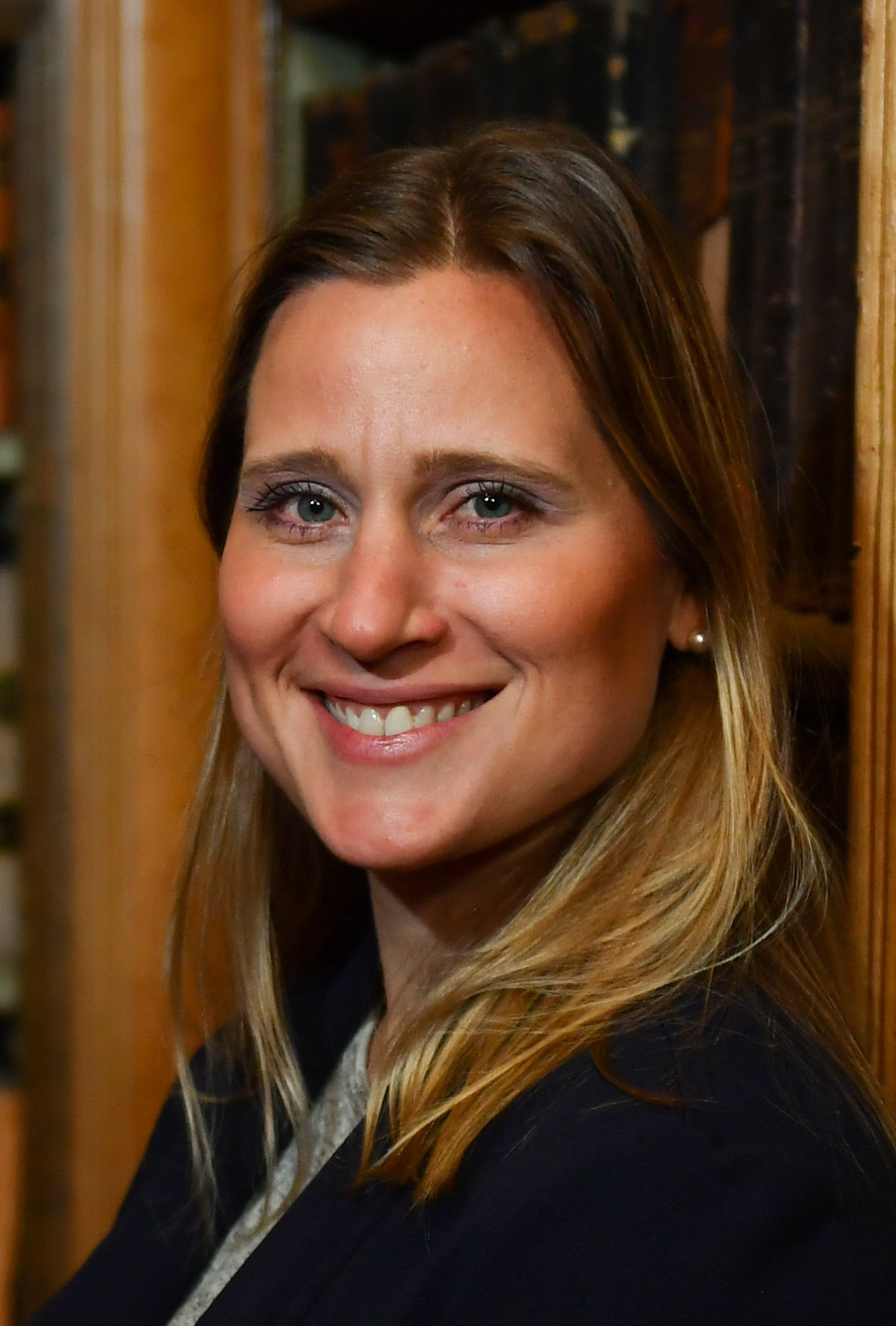
- Ruggiero in November 2018
- Born: January 3, 1980 (age 46) Panorama City, California, U.S.
- Height: 5 ft 9 in (175 cm)
- Weight: 192 lb (87 kg; 13 st 10 lb)
- Position: Defense
- Shot: Right
- Played for: Harvard University; Tulsa Oilers; Minnesota Whitecaps; Boston Blades
- National team: United States
- Playing career: 1996–2011
- Website: AngelaRuggiero.com

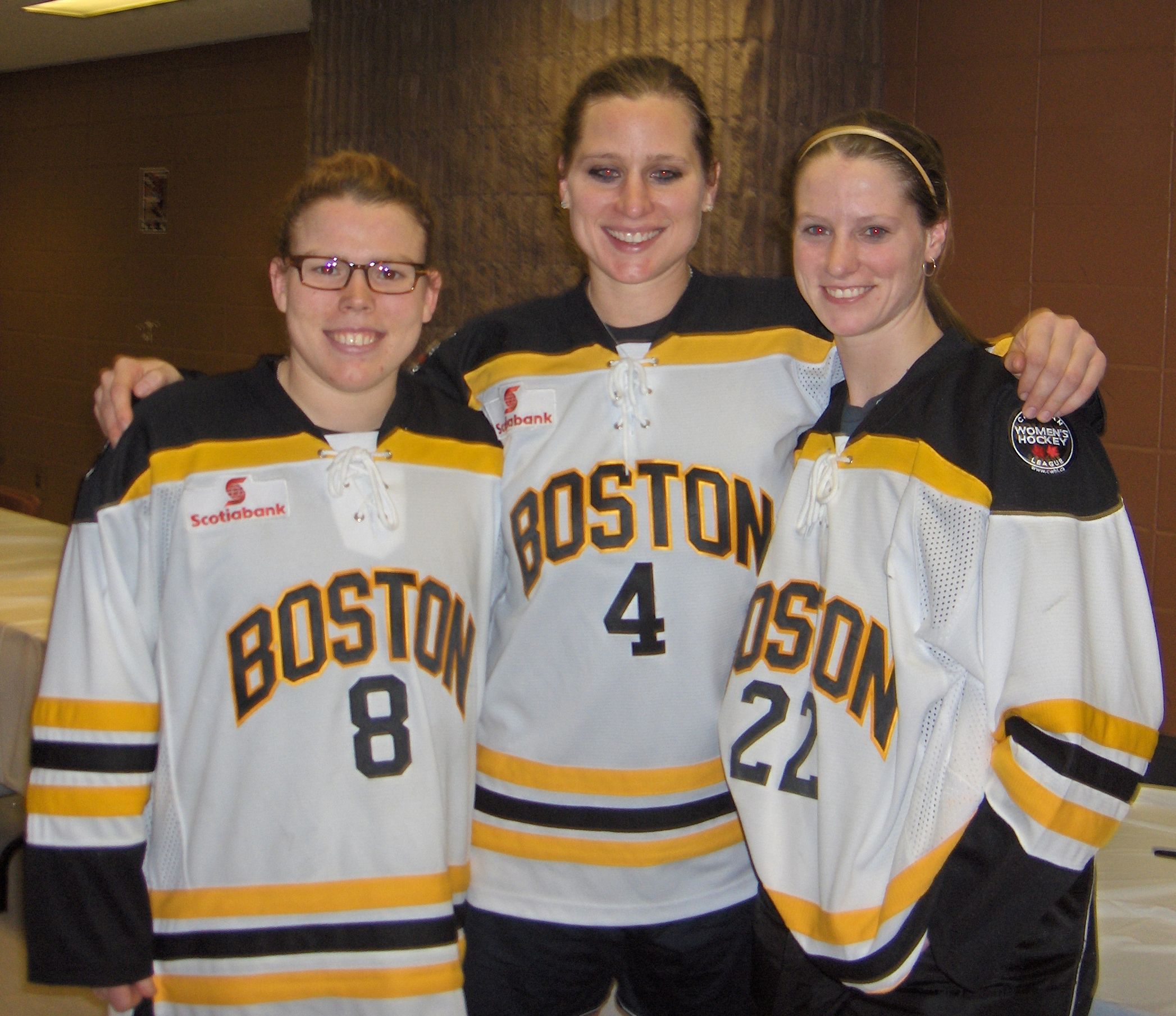
Ruggiero is recruited by Boston Blades with # 8 Caitlin Cahow and # 22 Kacey Bellamy during a special draft on August 12, 2010

Angela Marie Ruggiero OLY (born January 3, 1980) is an American former ice hockey defenseman, gold medalist, and four-time Olympian. She was a member of the International Olympic Committee from 2010 to 2018 and served as a member of the Executive Board of the IOC after being elected the Chairperson of the IOC Athletes' Commission, the body that represents all Olympic athletes worldwide, a post which she held from 2016 to 2018.

In her hockey career, Ruggiero was named as the best player in the NCAA and in the world by The Hockey News and named the US Olympic Committee’s Player of the Year. She was a member of the United States Women's National Ice Hockey Team, medaling in four successive Winter Olympic Games, including one gold medal in 1998, two silvers in 2002 and 2010, and one bronze in 2006. She competed in ten Women's World Championships, winning four gold medals and six silver medals. In that time she was named Best Defenseman twice at the Olympics and four times at the World Championships.

On June 29, 2015, Ruggiero was announced as a member of the Hockey Hall of Fame's Class of 2015. She was inducted on November 9, 2015. She was the fourth woman and the second American woman to be inducted. She is also the only California-born person (man or woman) to be inducted. Ruggiero is the all-time leader in games played for Team USA, male or female, with 256 games. Ruggiero was inducted into the United States Hockey Hall of Fame in 2015, and the IIHF Hall of Fame in 2017.

== Playing career ==
Born in Panorama City, CA, Ruggiero grew up in Sylmar and then Simi Valley, California.

Ruggiero played prep school hockey at Choate Rosemary Hall in Wallingford, Connecticut. While a senior at Choate, Ruggiero was the youngest member of the gold medal-winning 1998 United States Olympic Hockey Team in Nagano, Japan. She was also a member of the silver medal-winning 2002 team in Salt Lake City, Utah, a member of the bronze-winning 2006 team in Torino, Italy, and a member of the silver-winning 2010 team in Vancouver, Canada.

In her senior year at Harvard University, Ruggiero won the 2004 Patty Kazmaier Award as the top player in U.S. women's collegiate hockey. She was the only defenseman to win the award, until Sophie Jaques won it in 2023. She helped Harvard win a National Championship in 1999 and NCAA Runner-Up in 2003 and 2004. She graduated from Harvard cum laude in 2004 with a degree in government and was a four-time All-American selection and an Academic All-American. In her senior year, she was awarded the distinguished NCAA's Top VIII Award, for success on the ice, in the classroom, and in the community. Ruggiero was a three-time MVP for the Crimson.

Ruggiero made several U.S. professional hockey "firsts" on January 28, 2005, when she played for the Tulsa Oilers in a Central Hockey League game against the Rio Grande Valley Killer Bees. She was the first woman to actively play in a regular season professional hockey game in North America at a position other than goalie. In addition, since her brother Bill Ruggiero, was a goaltender for the Oilers, they were the first brother-sister combination to play professionally at the same time. She recorded an assist on the final goal of the game making her the only woman to score a point in a North American professional hockey game.

Ruggiero was also credited with the game-winning goal in the shoot-out that won the 2005 Women's World Ice Hockey Championships for the United States against the Canadian national women's hockey team, winning the first gold medal ever for the United States at the world championship. At the 2005 Esso National Women's Championships, she was named the Best Defenseman for Group A.

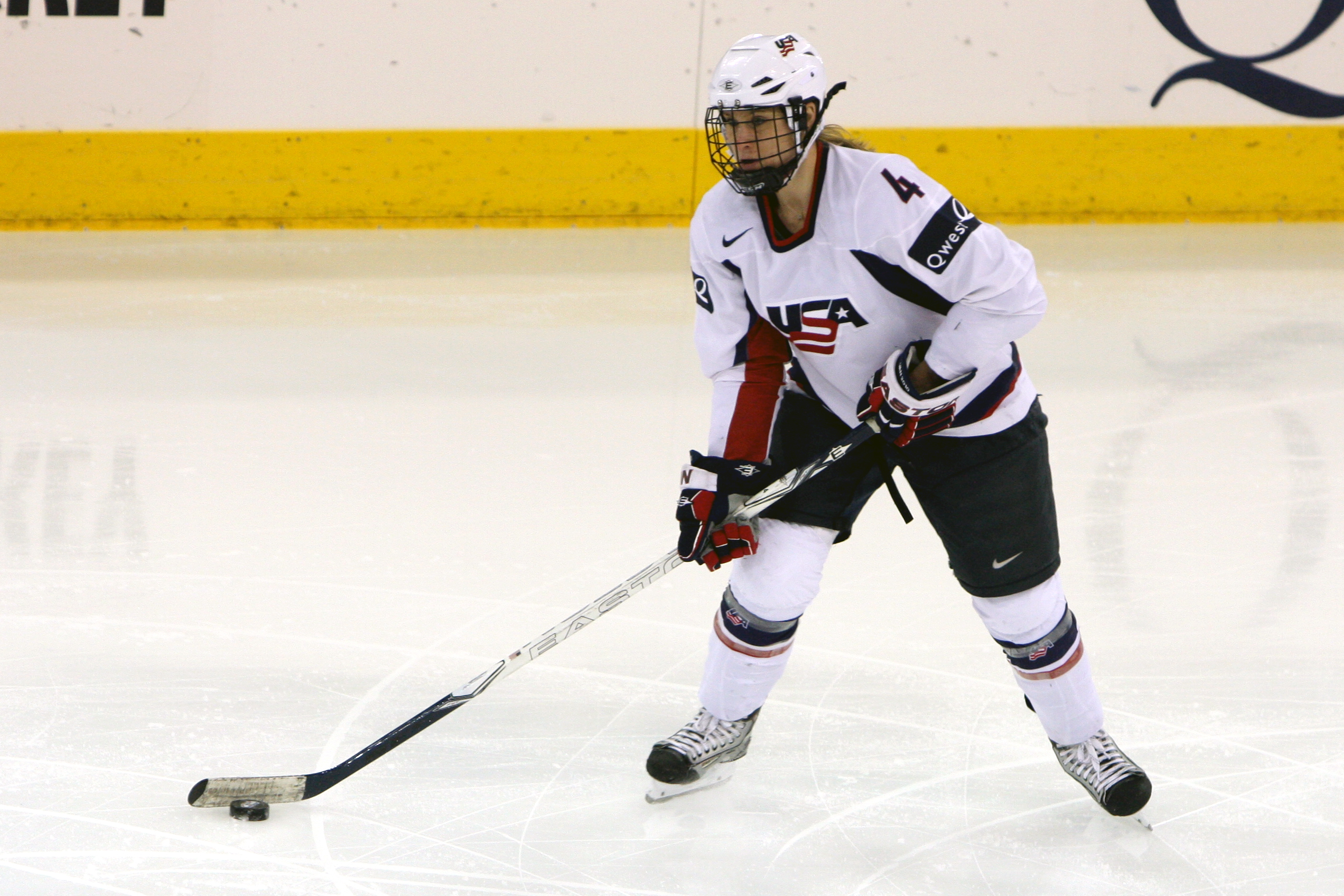
Ruggiero in a game against the ECAC All-Stars on January 3, 2010.

In December 2009, Ruggiero was named to her fourth Olympic hockey team. To prepare for the 2010 Olympics, she joined a group of NHL players in the summer of 2009 for workouts at Athletes' Performance in Carson, California. Her preparation relied less on powering through workouts and more on paying attention to detail. The training group included Chris Drury, Richard Park, and George Parros.

On January 14, 2010, she was named as an alternate captain for the United States Olympic Hockey Team. In addition, at the Vancouver Olympics, she was elected as a Member of the IOC's Athletes Commission, giving her an eight-year term as a Member of the IOC. Ruggiero played for the now-defunct CWHL's Boston Blades. During the 2010–11 Boston Blades season, Ruggiero scored the game-winning goal on December 19, 2010, which snapped the Montreal Stars undefeated season.

On December 28, 2011, Ruggiero announced her retirement via Twitter.

As IOC Member, Ruggiero presented gold medals to the US Women's Soccer Team at the 2012 Summer Olympics, to the US Women's Basketball Team at the 2016 Summer Olympics, and to the US Women's Ice Hockey Team at the 2018 Winter Olympics.

== Education ==
Ruggiero is a graduate of the Harvard Business School (M.B.A.), Harvard College (B.A.) cum laude, and the University of Minnesota (M.Ed.) 4.0 GPA. She received her master's degree in Sports Management from the University of Minnesota in 2010 while training for her final Olympics. While at Harvard, she was a First-Team Academic All-American and captured the NCAA's Top VIII Award, as one of the top eight student-athletes in the NCAA in 2004. She was later inducted into the 2015 COSIDA NCAA Academic All-American Hall of Fame.

== Personal life ==
After Ruggiero claimed the gold medal at the Nagano Winter Games, she was refused the opportunity to participate in a local game at a rink in St. Clair Shores, Michigan. Despite being willing to pay the entry fee, she was told that only men could participate at the rink. An undercover news crew investigated the matter, and the rink acquiesced to allow women to participate at the rink.

Ruggiero is the author of a memoir, Breaking the Ice: My Journey to Olympic Hockey, the Ivy League & Beyond, published by Drummond Publishing Group in 2005. The book, aimed at young women, details her hockey career, including her experiences with misconceptions about women's hockey and the challenges of being a female player in a male-dominated sport.

In May 2006, Ruggiero was selected from a field of twelve Olympians to be a candidate on the sixth season of NBC's business-themed reality game show The Apprentice. The season debuted in January 2007. During Ruggiero's time on the show, many references were made to her Olympic and hockey experience. She was eliminated on the season's tenth episode, airing on March 25, 2007. At the conclusion of her stint on the television show, she was offered a job from Donald Trump.

Ruggiero is married to Sarah Cahill, a former trainer with the University of Oklahoma, and a mother of two boys.

== Post-hockey career ==
Ruggiero is the CEO and co-founder of Sports Innovation Lab, a technology-powered market research firm empowering industry-leading sports brands to identify the trends, products, and services that will drive the future of sports. Sports Innovation Lab currently services over 70 global clients through a combination of proprietary data, software, and a team of analysts and strategists. Prior to Sports Innovation Lab, Ruggiero was a Senior Management Associate with Bridgewater Associates, the largest hedge fund in the world.

Ruggiero is a keynote and motivational speaker and has spoken at over 200 schools, businesses, and organizations including the United Nations, International Olympic Committee, KPMG, Nike, Coca-Cola, Liberty Mutual, and Johnson & Johnson, and the Small Business Association Annual Congress. She has contributed to The New York Times, Huffington Post, Detroit Free Press, Hartford Courant, Hockey Weekly, Detroit News, Chicago Tribune, and USA Today. She currently hosts “The Fluid Fan” podcast alongside producer Jack Barlow, for Sports Innovation Lab.

== Volunteer experience ==
Angela was the former director of the New York Islanders' Project Hope, as well as the New York Islanders Children's Foundation.

Ruggiero was a member of a goodwill tour of Olympic athletes that traveled to Afghanistan. After her senior year at Harvard, she spent the summer in Uganda with the Right to Play program. The objective was to implement a sporting program for children. Ruggiero has spoken several times at the UN, representing the IOC and women in sport.

Sports administration and boards
Ruggiero was a member of the Board of Directors of the United States Olympic Committee (10-18), Foundation Board Member of the World Anti-Doping Agency (14-16), and the former president and board member/trustee of the Women's Sports Foundation (08-17). As a Member of the International Olympic Committee (10-18), she served on the IOC's Executive Board (16-18), Member then Chair of the Athletes’ Commission (10-18, 16-18), the IOC's Olympic Channel (16-18), the 2018 Pyeongchang Coordination Commission (11-18), IOC's Evaluation Commission (‘11), and the Entourage Commission (10-15). She was the Chief Strategy Officer for the Los Angeles 2024/2028 successful Candidature Committee, the group organized to help bring the Olympics to Los Angeles in 2028. She was also the Chair of the IOC's Athletes' Commission and the 2016 Winter Youth Olympics. She currently serves on the boards of the Boston Athletic Association (BAA), the Harvard Varsity Club, the International Ice Hockey Federation (IIHF), Titletown Tech, the NFL Players’ Association One Team Collective, and is an Executive Board Member of World Rugby. She is a current member of the IOC's Digital and Technology Commission, the IOC's Nomination's Commission, and the IOC's Ethics Commission.

== Awards and honors ==
Medal record

Women's ice hockey

Representing the United States

Olympic Games
Gold medal – first place	1998 Nagano	Team competition
Silver medal – second place	2002 Salt Lake City	Team competition
Silver medal – second place	2010 Vancouver	Team competition
Bronze medal – third place	2006 Turin	Team competition

World Championships
Gold medal – first place	2005 Sweden	Team competition
Gold medal – first place	2008 China	Team competition
Gold medal – first place	2009 Finland	Team competition
Gold medal – first place	2011 Switzerland	Team competition
Silver medal – second place	1997 Canada	Team competition
Silver medal – second place	1999 Finland	Team competition
Silver medal – second place	2000 Canada	Team competition
Silver medal – second place	2001 United States	Team competition
Silver medal – second place	2004 Canada	Team competition
Silver medal – second place	2007 Canada	Team competition

- 1998 Olympic gold medalist
- 2002 Olympic silver medalist
- 2006 Olympic bronze medalist
- 2010 Olympic silver medalist
- Hockey Hall of Fame inductee
- United States Hockey Hall of Fame inductee (2015)
- IIHF Hall of Fame inductee (2017)

USA Hockey
Four-time Olympian (gold 1998, silver 2002, bronze 2006, silver 2010). Named the tournament's top defensemen twice (2002, 2006). Tied for the lead among tournament defensemen with six points (2-4) in 2006. Youngest member (18) of the team in 1998. Ten-time member of the U.S. Women's National Team at the International Ice Hockey Federation World Women's Championship (gold-2005, 2008–09, 2011; silver-1997, 1999–01, 2004, 2007). Named the tournament's top defenseman four times (2001, 2004–05, 2008). Selected to the media-all star team four times (2004–05, 2007, 2009). Named to the team in 2003, but the event was canceled. Member of the U.S. Women's National Team for the 1996 Pacific Rim Women's Championship (2nd). Seven-time member of the U.S. Women's Select Team for the Four/Three Nations Cup (1st-1997, 2003, 2008; 2nd-2000, 2004–06). Led team with four assists in 2003. Member of the U.S. Women's National Team in 1997–98, 2000–01, 2001-02 (Visa Skate to Salt Lake Tour) and 2005-06 (Hilton Family Skate to 2006 Tour); and the U.S. Women's Select Team in 2008–09. Led team defensemen with 35 points (12-23) in 2001–02. Two-time member of the U.S. Women's Under-22 Select Team (1999-00) ... Eleven-time USA Hockey Women's National Festival participant (1997-05, 2008–09). 2003 and 2004 USA Hockey Bob Allen Women's Player of the Year Award winner. She accumulated 208 points (67-141) during her time in a Team USA sweater, having played more games (256) than any other man or woman in a USA Hockey jersey.

College
Played four years at Harvard University of ECAC Hockey. Four-time finalist for the Patty Kazmaier Memorial Award (Winner-2004, Top Three-2003, Top Ten-1999-00) and four-time All-American selection (First Team-199-00, 2003–04). Finished with 253 points (96-157) to rank sixth all-time at Harvard and first among defensemen. As a senior (2003–04): ECACH and Ivy League Player of the Year ... Led team to the ECACH championship and a berth in the NCAA championship game for the second straight year. As a junior (2002–03): top-scoring defenseman in the country (29-54-83) and ranked second in assists per game (1.59). Helped team to the ECACH championship. As a sophomore (1999–2000): tied for 12th in the nation and led all defensemen with 54 points (21-33). As a freshman (1998–99): finished fifth in the ECACH with 51 points (16-35). Led Harvard to the national championship in ‘99, and NCAA runner-up in 2003 and 2004.

- American Women's College Hockey Alliance All-Americans, First Team (1999)
- Beanpot MVP (2004)
- Best Female Hockey Player in the World by The Hockey News (2003)
- Directorate Award as the Top Defenseman at the Winter Olympics, Salt Lake City (2002)
- ECAC Player of the Year (2004)
- 2004 ECAC Tournament Most Valuable Player,
- ECAC All-Academic Team (2003–2004)
- Four-time NCAA All-American (2001, 2002, 2003, 2004)
- Four-time NCAA All-ECAC (2001, 2002, 2003, 2004)
- Harvard Crimson Female Athlete of the Year (2004)
- Harvard MVP (2001, 2003, 2004)
- Ivy League Player of the Year (2004)
- NCAA First Team Academic All-American (2004)
- NCAA Top VIII award as one of the top 8 student-athletes in the entire NCAA (2004)
- NCAA National Strength and Conditioning Association Athlete of the Year (2004)
- New England Sports Writer's Player of the Year (2004)
- Patty Kazmaier Memorial Trophy winner (2004)
- Patty Kazmaier Memorial Trophy, Top 3 Finalist (2003)
- Ranked one of Top 16 Female Athletes in the World by ESPN.com (2004)
- Ranked #94 on The Hockey News 2011 List of the 100 Most Powerful People in Hockey
- Ranked #94 for the second consecutive year on The Hockey News 2012 List of the 100 Most Powerful People in Hockey
- Top Defenseman Award at the Winter Olympics (2002, 2006)
- Top Defenseman Award at the ESSO Canadian Provincials (2005)
- Top Defenseman in the World by The Globe and Mail (2003)

Other

Ruggiero helped the Minnesota Whitecaps to the Western Women's Hockey League championship in 2008–09. She skated part-time for the Whitecaps in 2007-08 and ranked second on the team with 18 points (8-10) in 15 games. She made history on January 28, 2005, when she and her brother, Bill, competed for the Central Hockey League's Tulsa Oilers, becoming the first-ever brother-sister tandem to play in a professional hockey game. She was the first female skater to play in a North American professional hockey game, where she recorded an assist. Ruggiero joined the National Women's Hockey League's Montreal Axion part way through the 2004-05 season. On October 22, 2011, Ruggiero was inducted into the National Italian Sports Hall of Fame. EA Sports officially announced that Ruggiero would be among the first two female hockey players in NHL 13. Along with Hayley Wickenheiser, she has a playable character in the game which can be added to any team of the user's choice.

Awards and achievements
Preceded by Jennifer Botterill	Patty Kazmaier Award; 2003–04	Succeeded by Krissy Wendell
