= Monique Lamoureux =

American ice hockey player (born 1989)

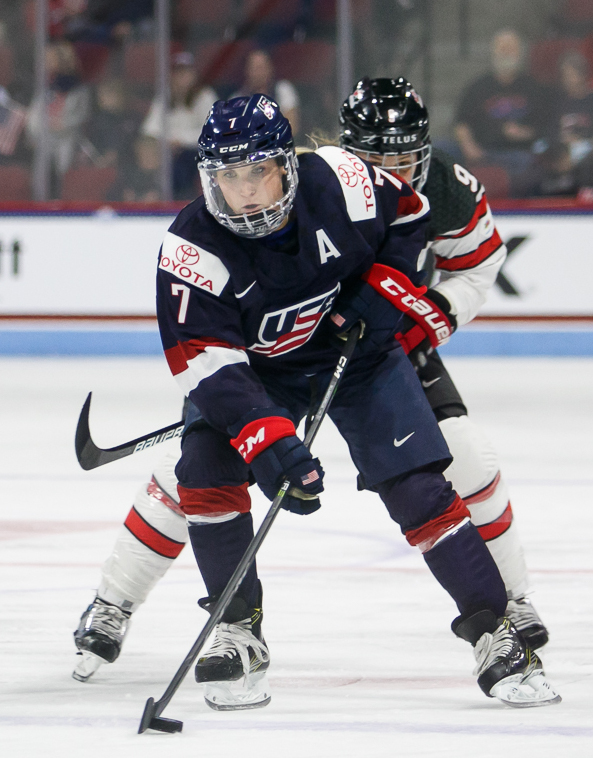
- Monique Lamoureux playing for Team USA in 2017
- Born: July 3, 1989 (age 37) Grand Forks, North Dakota, U.S.
- Height: 5 ft 6 in (168 cm)
- Weight: 154 lb (70 kg; 11 st 0 lb)
- Position: Defense
- Shot: Right
- Played for: Minnesota; North Dakota; Boston Blades
- National team: United States
- Playing career: 2008–2021
Medal record
Olympic Games
Gold medal – first place	2018 Pyeongchang	Team
Silver medal – second place	2010 Vancouver	Team
Silver medal – second place	2014 Sochi	Team
World Championships
Gold medal – first place	2009 Finland
Gold medal – first place	2011 Switzerland
Gold medal – first place	2013 Canada
Gold medal – first place	2015 Sweden
Gold medal – first place	2016 Canada
Gold medal – first place	2017 United States
Silver medal – second place	2012 United States

Monique Edith Lamoureux-Morando (born July 3, 1989), previously known as Monique Lamoureux-Kolls, is an American former ice hockey player. She scored the game-tying goal in the final of the 2018 Winter Olympics before her twin sister Jocelyne scored the last shootout goal of the game to clinch the gold medal.

She also captured silver medals for Team USA at the 2010 and 2014 Winter Olympics. She competed for a year with the Professional Women's Hockey Players Association, a worker's union pushing for equality in the sport, and retired from playing in 2021. After her retirement, Monique and her twin sister published their first book Dare to Make History. The sisters also founded the Lamoureux Foundation, which funds educational and extracurricular programs for children in need, primarily in their home state of North Dakota.

== Playing career ==
Lamoureux and her twin sister were from a family deeply dedicated to ice hockey. Together, they played on the Peewee A Boys' team in 2001–02 (called the Seawolves) and led them to the peewee North Dakota State Hockey championship. Afterwards, they accepted a scholarship to Shattuck-St. Mary's School in Minnesota, the same school at which Sidney Crosby played. At Shattuck-St. Mary's, the Lamoureux sisters led the school to the three national titles in 2005, 2006, and 2007. In her freshman year at Shattuck (2004–05), she tallied 113 points (57 goals, 56 assists) in 62 games. She had 116 points (53 goals, 63 assists) in 68 games in 2005–06 to place third on the team in points and second in goals. As a junior, she ranked first on the team in 2006–07 with 135 points (85 goals, 50 assists). She led the team with 134 points (82 goals, 52 assists) as a senior in 2007–08 and helped Shattuck to a 53–3–1 record.

=== Minnesota Golden Gophers ===
As a freshman for the Gophers in 2008–09, she was the team's third leading goal scorer, and a second team All-America selection. By mid-February 2009, Lamoureux was leading the nation with 64 points on 32 assists and 32 goals. By season's end, she ranked third in the NCAA and first among rookies with 75 points in 40 games (39 goals, 36 assists). She ranked second in the nation with five shorthanded goals and tied for third with eight game-winners. She participated in her first Frozen Four that season. In addition, she was the WCHA scoring champion, and WCHA Rookie of the Year. She was the only freshman to be named a top-10 finalist for Patty Kazmaier Memorial Award.

=== North Dakota Fighting Sioux ===
In 2009, Lamoureux and her sister transferred from Minnesota to North Dakota. The reason for the transfer to their home state was attributed to the fact that North Dakota hired Brian Idalski, a former coach at the USA Hockey Development Camps. On January 15 and 16, 2011, she led the Fighting Sioux with five points in two victories over league rival Bemidji State. She earned a +7 plus/minus rating in her first weekend playing exclusively as a defenseman. In the series against Bemidji, she scored two goals and assisted on three others as North Dakota ran its unbeaten streak to five games at 4–0–1. Over 59 collegiate games, she has accumulated 107 points (54 goals, 53 assists).

=== USA Hockey ===
With her twin sister, she was a four-time USA Hockey Player Development Camp attendee (2004–07). She was a member of the United States Women's Select Team for the 2006 Four Nations Cup. The team finished in second place. In 2008, she was part of the United States Women's Under-22 Select Team for the 2008 Under-22 Series. In addition, she was a two-time USA Hockey Women's National Festival participant (2008–09). Along with her sister, she was a member of the United States Women's National Team for the 2009 International Ice Hockey Federation World Women's Championship that won the gold medal. She won a silver medal at the 2010 Winter Olympics with the 2009–10 USA Hockey national women's team. Monique and her sister Jocelyne were the first set of twins ever to play women's ice hockey in the Olympics. Lamoureux-Kolls was named to the roster for the 2010 Four Nations Cup. In the opening match of the 2012 IIHF World Women's Championships, Lamoureux scored two goals in a 9–2 win over Canada. Her sister Jocelyne scored three goals while assisting on three others.

=== CWHL ===
Selected by the Boston Blades in the 2014 CWHL Draft, Lamoureux would win the 2015 Clarkson Cup. In the third period of an 8–0 win on January 18, 2015, for the Boston Blades over the Brampton Thunder, a fight took place. Lamoureux and Brampton's Jamie Lee Rattray both threw punches, as video footage went viral online.

== Career statistics ==
Year	Team	GP	G	A	Pts	+/-	PIM	PPG	SHG	GWG
2014–15	Boston Blades	17	6	12	18	+20	23	0	0	0

== Awards and honors ==
=== NCAA ===
- All-WCHA First Team, 2009
- Patty Kazmaier Award, Top 10 Finalist
- Second Team All-America selection, 2009
- WCHA All-Rookie Team, 2009
- WCHA Rookie of the Year selection, 2009
- WCHA scoring champion, 2009
- Runner-Up, 2010–11 WCHA Preseason Player of the Year
- WCHA Defensive Player of the Week (week of January 19, 2011)
- WCHA co-Defensive Players of the Week (week of February 7, 2011)
- 2011 Patty Kazmaier Award Nominee
- 2011 All-WCHA Second Team
- WCHA Player of the Week (week of October 25, 2011)
- WCHA Defensive Player of the Week (week of February 8, 2012)

=== IIHF ===
- Directorate Award, Best Forward, 2011 IIHF Women's World Championship
- U.S. Player of the Game in Gold Medal match, 2011 4 Nations Cup
- 2015 IIHF Media All Star Team, Defense 2015 IIHF Women's World Championship

=== USA Hockey ===
- Bob Allen Women's Player of the Year Award, 2016

=== Other ===
- Theodore Roosevelt Rough Rider Award from the State of North Dakota

== Personal life ==
Her father Jean-Pierre was a backup goaltender at the University of North Dakota from 1979–83. Besides her twin sister, Lamoureux has four brothers. Jean-Philippe is a professional ice hockey goaltender. He led the Lincoln Stars to the Clark Cup as a teenager and played for Team USA in the 2004 Viking Cup. He was the 2008–09 Goalie of the Year in the ECHL, and also led the Alaska Aces to the 2009 Kelly Cup Finals. Jacques was an All-America center in 2009 for Air Force Academy. In addition, he was a finalist for the Hobey Baker Award. Pierre-Paul played for the University of Manitoba, and is a student-assistant coach for the North Dakota hockey team. Mario skated for Team USA at the 2006 Viking Cup and then played for the North Dakota Fighting Sioux before turning pro. Her mother Linda competed in the Boston Marathon.

== Dare to Make History ==
On February 23, 2021, Jocelyne and her twin sister published Dare to Make History, a memoir chronicling their journey to the pinnacle of the hockey world.

== See also ==
- List of Olympic medalist families
