= Jocelyne Lamoureux =

American ice hockey forward (born 1989)

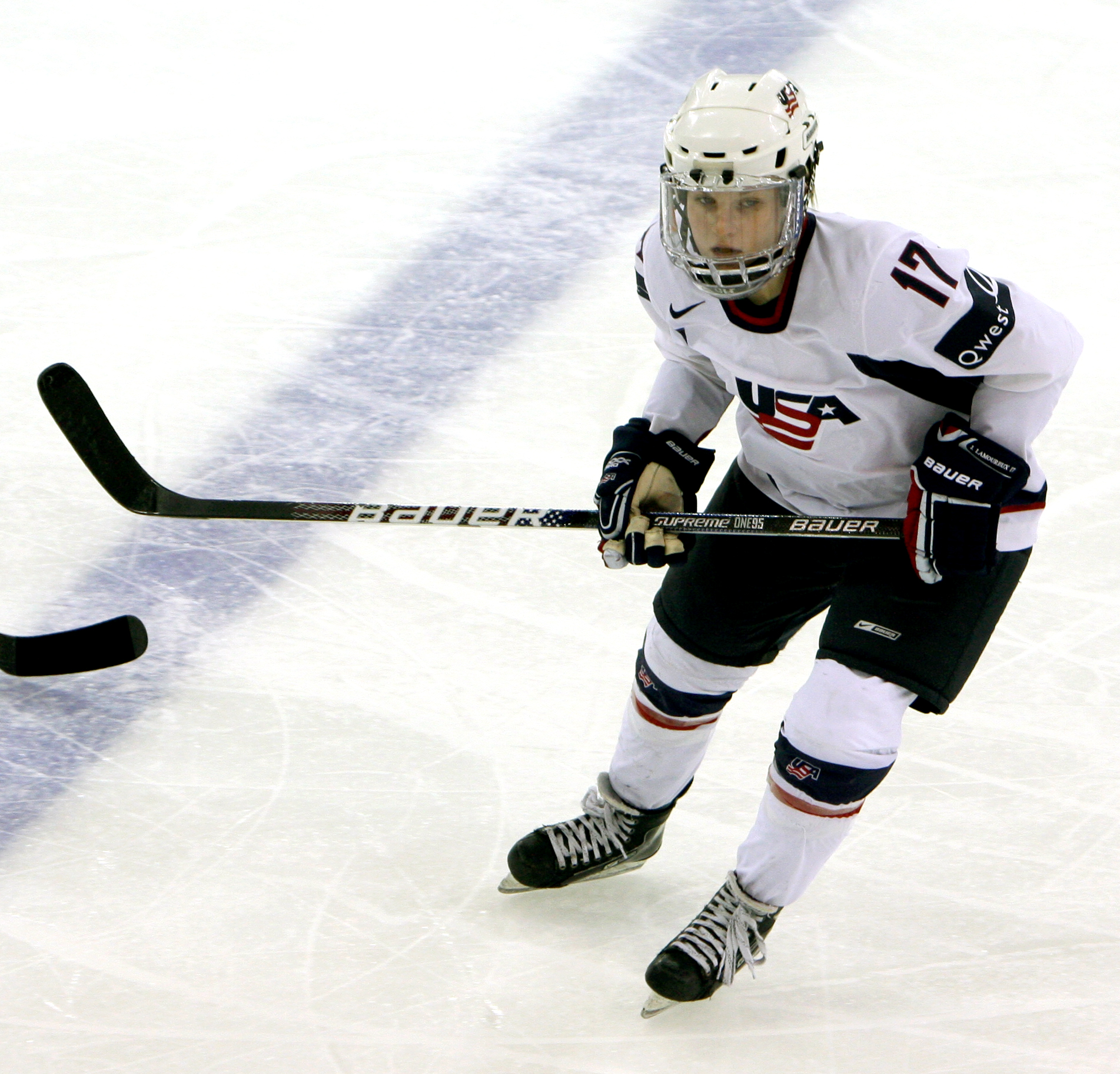
- Jocelyne Lamoureux playing for Team USA against the ECAC All-Stars in 2010
- Born: July 3, 1989 (age 37) Grand Forks, North Dakota, U.S.
- Height: 5 ft 6 in (168 cm)
- Weight: 154 lb (70 kg; 11 st 0 lb)
- Position: Forward
- Shot: Right
- Played for: University of Minnesota; University of North Dakota
- National team: United States
- Playing career: 2008–2021
Medal record
Olympic Games
Gold medal – first place	2018 Pyeongchang	Team
Silver medal – second place	2010 Vancouver	Team
Silver medal – second place	2014 Sochi	Team
World Championships
Gold medal – first place	2009 Finland
Gold medal – first place	2011 Switzerland
Gold medal – first place	2013 Canada
Gold medal – first place	2015 Sweden
Gold medal – first place	2016 Canada
Gold medal – first place	2017 United States
Silver medal – second place	2012 United States

Jocelyne Nicole Lamoureux-Davidson (born July 3, 1989) is an American former ice hockey player. She scored the game-winning shootout goal to win the gold medal for Team USA at the 2018 Winter Olympics against Canada after her twin sister Monique tied the game near the end of regulation.

Lamoureux-Davidson also won silver medals for the United States women's national ice hockey team at the 2010 and 2014 Winter Olympics. Lamoureux played one season of NCAA hockey for the University of Minnesota and three for the University of North Dakota. She competed for a year with the Professional Women's Hockey Players Association, a worker's union pushing for equality in the sport, and retired from playing in 2021. After her retirement, Monique and her twin sister published their first book Dare to Make History. The sisters also founded the Lamoureux Foundation, which funds educational and extracurricular programs for children in need, primarily in their home state of North Dakota.

== Playing career ==
Jocelyne and her twin sister were both all-state in ice hockey as teenagers. Together they played on the Peewee A Boys' team in 2001–02 team (called the Wheat Kings) as twelve-year-olds, leading them to the North Dakota State Hockey championship. Afterwards they accepted a scholarship to Shattuck-St. Mary's School in Minnesota, the same school at which Sidney Crosby played. The Lamoureux sisters led the school to four state titles and three national championships (2005, 2006, and 2007). In her freshman year (2004–05), she accumulated 102 points (47 goals, 55 assists) in 60 games. In the following season she had 137 points (68 goals, 69 assists) in 59 games to place second on the team in points and first in goals. In 2006–07 she ranked second on the team with 131 points (65 goals, 66 assists), and tallied 107 points (42 goals, 65 assists) in 27 games as a senior.

=== University of Minnesota ===
As a freshman in 2008–09, she finished second on the team and fourth in the nation with 65 points (28 goals, 37 assists). The Gophers appeared in the NCAA Women's Frozen Four. At season's end, she was awarded All-WCHA First Team and All-WCHA Rookie Team honors.

=== University of North Dakota ===
In 2009 Jocelyne and her sister transferred from Minnesota to North Dakota. Their transfer to their home state was attributed to the fact that North Dakota hired Brian Idalski, a former coach at the USA Hockey Development Camps. On October 23, 2010, she had a hat trick and one assist against Minnesota State . In addition, one of her goals was the game-winning goal. The hat trick was the first by a North Dakota player since Cami Wooster in 2005.

=== USA Hockey ===
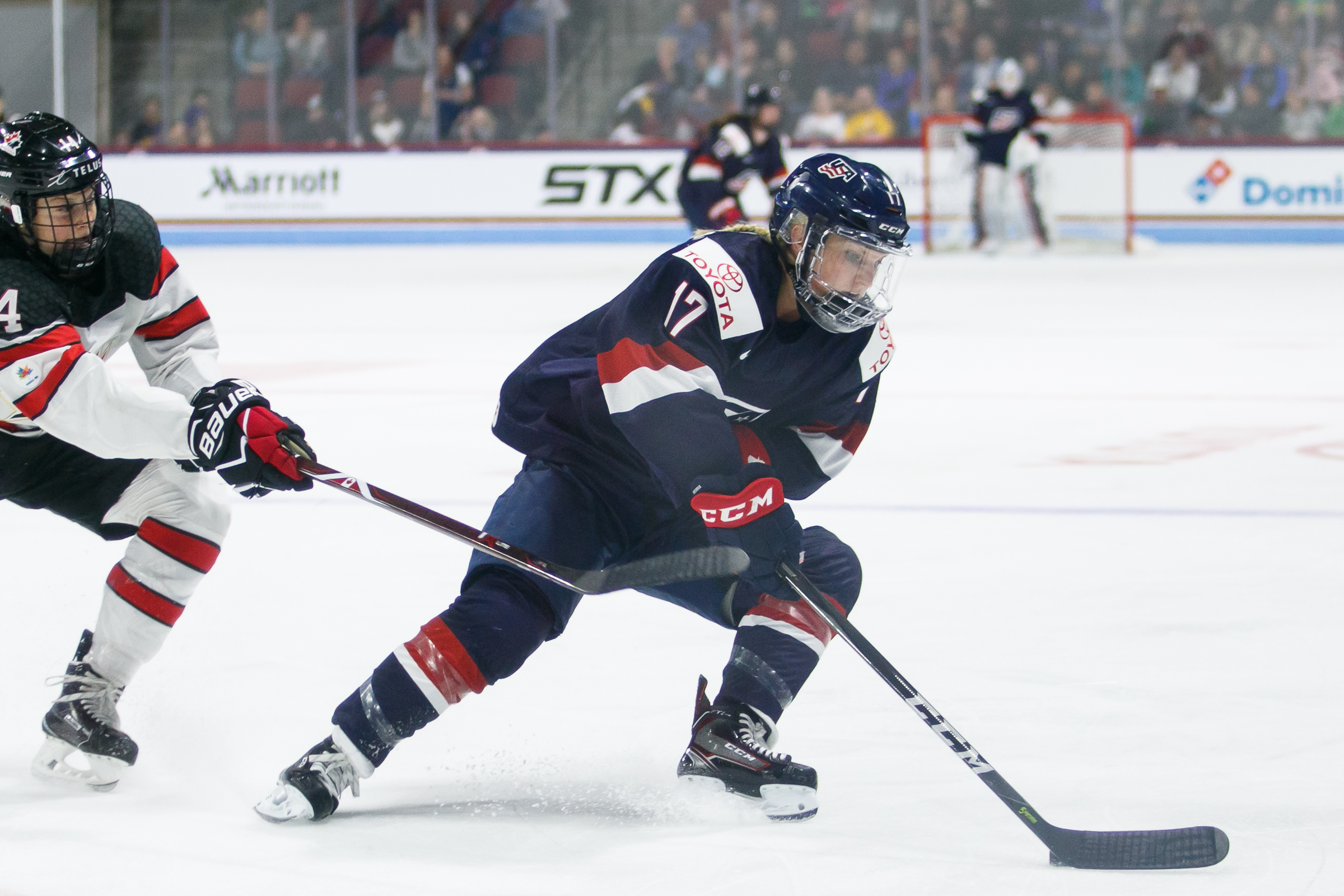
Jocelyne Lamoureux-Davidson playing for Team USA in 2017

Her first exposure to USA Hockey was at the USA Hockey Player Development Camp. She ended up being a four-time USA Hockey Player Development Camp attendee (2004–07). She was a two-time USA Hockey Women's National Festival participant (2008–09) and a member of the United States Women's Under-22 Select Team for the 2008 Under-22 Series. She led the team with two goals. Lamoureux also participated as a two-time member of the United States Women's Select Team for the Four Nations Cup (1st 2008, 2nd 2006). Along with her sister, she was a member of the United States Women's National Team for the 2009 International Ice Hockey Federation World Women's Championship that won the gold medal. Jocelyne and her sister Monique were the first set of twins ever to play women's ice hockey in the Olympics. Lamoureux was named to the roster for the 2010 Four Nations Cup. In the opening match of the 2012 IIHF World Women's Championships, Lamoureux scored three goals while assisting on three others in a 9–2 win over Canada. Her sister, Monique Lamoureux-Kolls, and Hilary Knight each scored twice.

Jocelyne finished her career with USA Hockey in the 2019-2020 Rivalry Series. She was inducted into the U.S. Hockey Hall of Fame as a member of the Class of 2022.

==== Olympics ====
Jocelyne has been to the Olympics three times: in 2010, 2014, and 2018. Team USA won silver medals in 2010 and 2014 and a gold medal in 2018, all three tournaments skating against Canada. In the gold medal game of the 2018 Winter Olympics, Jocelyne scored the game-winning goal in the first extra round of the shootout after the preliminary five rounds, and 20 minutes of overtime, were not decisive. Goaltender Maddie Rooney then stopped Meghan Agosta to seal the gold medal for Team USA, their first in twenty years. Jocelyne's twin sister Monique had tied the game near the end of regulation. In Team USA's preliminary round match against the Olympic Athletes from Russia of the 2018 Olympics, she scored two goals six seconds apart, an Olympic record for shortest time between goals by anyone, men or women.

== Awards and honors ==
- 2008–09 WCHA finalist, Pre-season Rookie of the Year
- All-WCHA First Team, 2009
- WCHA All-Rookie Team, 2009
- WCHA co-Offensive Players of the Week (week of October 27, 2010)
- 2011 Patty Kazmaier Award Nominee
- 2011 All-WCHA Second Team
- WCHA Player of the Week (week of November 8, 2011)
- U.S. Player of the Game, November 10, 2011, vs. Canada, 2011 4 Nations Cup
- WCHA Player of the Week (week of January 23, 2012)
- Finalist, 2012 Patty Kazmaier Award
- 2012 NCAA scoring champion
- 2012 WCHA scoring champion
- UND's 2011–12 Grace Rhonemus Female Athlete of the Year Award
- 2012 Capital One Academic All-American
- 2014 NCAA Today's Top 10 Award
- Theodore Roosevelt Rough Rider Award from the State of North Dakota

== Personal life ==
Her father, Jean-Pierre, was a backup goaltender at the University of North Dakota from 1979–83. Besides her twin sister, Lamoureux has four brothers. Jean-Philippe was a professional ice hockey goaltender. He led the Lincoln Stars to the Clark Cup as a teenager and played for Team USA in the 2004 Viking Cup. He was the 2008–09 Goalie of the Year in the ECHL. He also led the Alaska Aces to the 2009 Kelly Cup Finals Finals. Jacques was an All-America center in 2009 for Air Force Academy. In addition, he was a finalist for the Hobey Baker Award. Pierre-Paul played for the University of Manitoba and is a student-assistant coach for the North Dakota hockey team. Mario skated for Team USA at the 2006 Viking Cup and played four years for North Dakota. He was named team captain in 2012 and then entered the pro ranks. Her mother, Linda, competed in 20 marathons including the Boston Marathon.

Lamoureux has publicly advocated for the exclusion of transgender female athletes from women's sports.

She received a bachelor's degree in Kinesiology in 2011 and a master's degree in Kinesiology in 2013 both from the University of North Dakota.

== Dare to Make History ==
On February 23, 2021, Jocelyne and her twin sister published Dare to Make History, a memoir.

== See also ==
- List of Olympic medalist families
