= Caitlin Cahow =

American ice hockey player (born 1985)

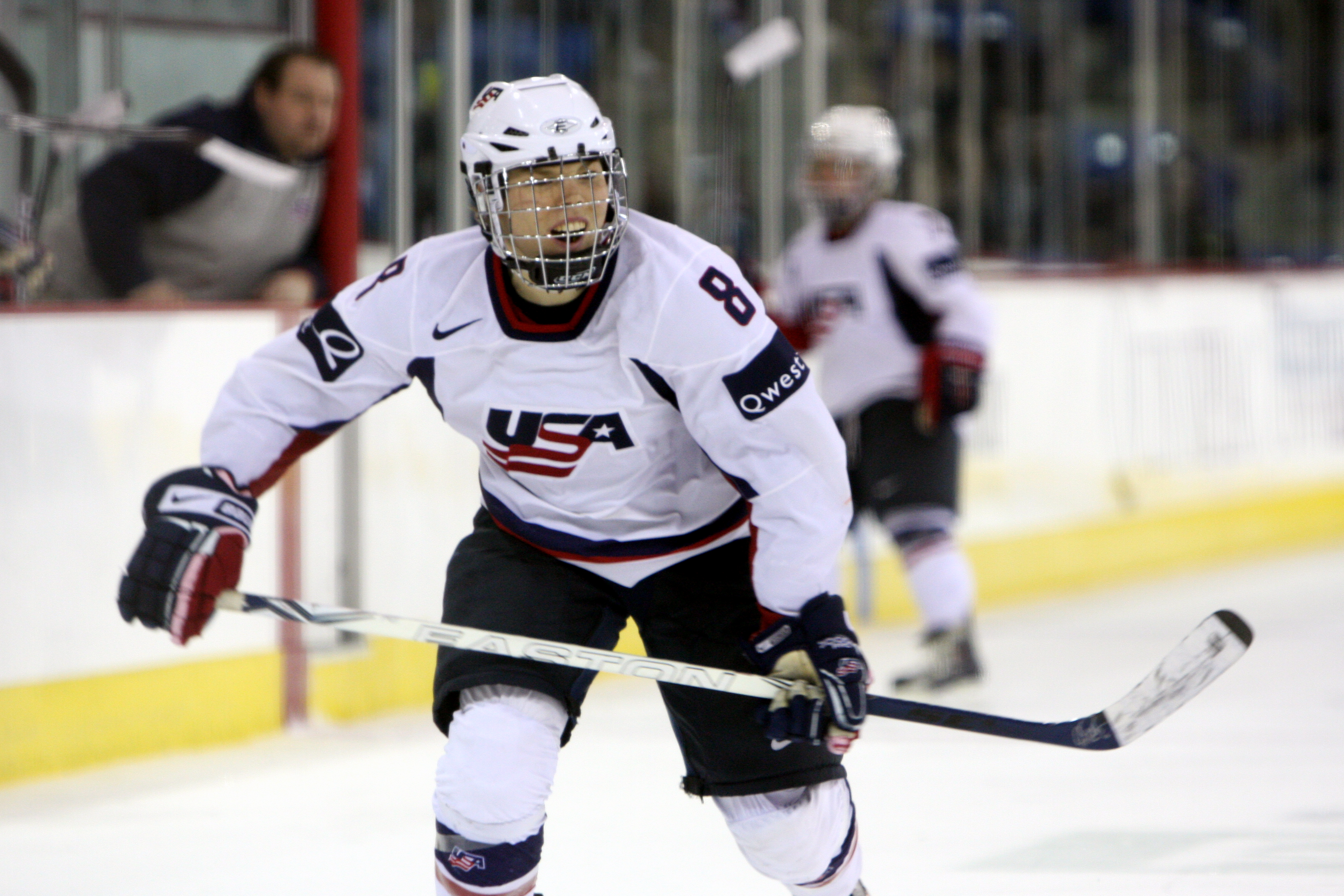
- Born: May 20, 1985 (age 41) New Haven, Connecticut, U.S.
- Height: 5 ft 4 in (163 cm)
- Weight: 156 lb (71 kg; 11 st 2 lb)
- Position: Defence
- Shot: Left
- Played for: Boston Blades (CWHL); Minnesota Whitecaps (WWHL); Harvard Crimson (NCAA)
- National team: United States
- Playing career: 2006–2013
Medal record
Women's ice hockey
Representing United States
Olympic Games
Silver medal – second place	2010 Vancouver	Tournament
Bronze medal – third place	2006 Turin	Tournament
IIHF World Women's Championships
Gold medal – first place	2008 China	Tournament
Gold medal – first place	2009 Finland	Tournament
Gold medal – first place	2011 Switzerland	Tournament
Silver medal – second place	2007 Canada	Tournament
4 Nations Cup
Gold medal – first place	2011 Sweden	Tournament
Silver medal – second place	2010 Canada	Tournament

Caitlin Kinder Cahow (born May 20, 1985) is an American former ice hockey player. She attended the Foote School, where she graduated in 2000, and then attended the Hotchkiss School where she graduated in 2003, after playing soccer, field hockey, ice hockey and lacrosse.

Cahow was a member of the United States women's national ice hockey team and also for Boston Blades in the Canadian Women's Hockey League. She graduated from Harvard University in 2008, with a bachelor's degree in social/biological anthropology and from Boston College Law School in 2013.

== Playing career ==
While Cahow's mother was a professor of Endocrine Surgery at Yale University, her first exposure to the ice rink was through figure skating. After one figure skating practice, she saw hockey players take to the ice and noticed that the players had ponytails. From there, Cahow gave up figure skating and attended a kids' hockey clinic. Most of the students at the clinic were boys. Cahow's mother forced her to play her first year in hockey wearing figure skates.

=== NCAA ===
Cahow played four years at Harvard Crimson women's ice hockey in the ECAC Hockey. Led all ECACH defensemen with 37 points (15–22) in 34 games. As a Junior (2006–07): Led team defensemen with 28 points (8–20) in 30 games.

=== WWHL ===
She tied for first among the league's defensemen with 21 points (3–18) in 19 games. She helped the Minnesota Whitecaps to the Western Women's Hockey League championship in 2008–09 season and was named top defenseman at the Championship.

=== CWHL ===
During the 2012–13 CWHL season, Cahow was the captain of the Boston Blades. By season's end, she became the second American-born captain to help a team win the Clarkson Cup.

=== USA Hockey ===
She won a bronze medal at the 2006 Winter Olympics. She plays defense and is left-handed. Before the Olympics, Cahow captained the United States Under-22 Select Team in 2006 after the USA Hockey National Women's Festival in Lake Placid, New York.

=== JAL Hockey ===
Caitlin last played for the JD Whale, an adult recreational league based at Johnny's Ice House in Chicago, in Winter 2014–2015. JAL stands for Johnny's Adult League.

== Awards and honors ==
USA Hockey

- 2006 Olympic Winter Games bronze medalist
- 2010 Olympic Winter Games silver medalist
- Four-time member of the U.S. Women's National Team for the International Ice Hockey Federation World Women's Championship (gold 2008, 2009, 2011 and silver 2007). She played forward for the majority of the tournament and scored twice in the gold-medal game in 2009. Led U.S. defensemen with five points (2–3) and named one of Team USA's top-three players in 2008
- Four-time member of the U.S. Women's Select Team for the Four Nations Cup (1st-2008, 2nd-2005-07)
- Member of the U.S. Women's National Team in 2005–06 (Hilton Family Skate to 2006 Tour) and the U.S. Women's Select Team in 2008–09
- Served as captain of the U.S. Women's Under-22 Select Team for the 2006 Under-22 Series against Canada
- Five-time USA Hockey Women's National Festival participant (2005–09).

College

- Named top-10 finalist for 2008 Patty Kazmaier Memorial Award
- RBK Hockey First-Team All-America and First Team All-ECAC Hockey selection
- 2006–07 ECAC Coaches Preseason All-League Selection
- 2008 ECAC Tournament Most Valuable Player,
- First Team All-Ivy League, 2007–08, Defenseman, Harvard (Senior), Unanimous selection
- 2008 Bob Allen Women's Player of the Year Award
- Media All-Star team, 2011 IIHF Women's World Championship

== Personal life ==
Cahow was born in New Haven, Connecticut and raised in Branford, Connecticut. She was named after figure skater Caitlin Carruthers, who won a silver medal for pairs skating with her brother, Peter Carruthers, at the 1984 Olympics. Cahow's mother, Barbara Kinder was a professor of surgery at Yale University. One of Cahow's heroes was Manon Rhéaume. The two got the opportunity to play together for the Minnesota Whitecaps.

Cahow's father, Elton, was a surgeon and he died of cancer when she was only 11 years old. Cahow graduated from Harvard University in 2008 with a degree in anthropology. Cahow also studied the French language at Harvard and used it for an interview with French-Canadian media. As a student at Harvard, Cahow met Boston Lobsters tennis player Nicole Pratt. Cahow and Pratt developed a hockey-tennis dry-land workout which helped Pratt make a comeback at the French Open tennis tournament.

Cahow has two brothers, Garrett and Christian.

Cahow, who is openly lesbian, was chosen by US President Barack Obama as part of his delegation to the 2014 Winter Olympics in Sochi, Russia.

Cahow lived in Vinalhaven, Maine, but now lives in Atlanta and is an attorney at Jones Day.
