= Kacey Bellamy =

American ice hockey player (born 1987)

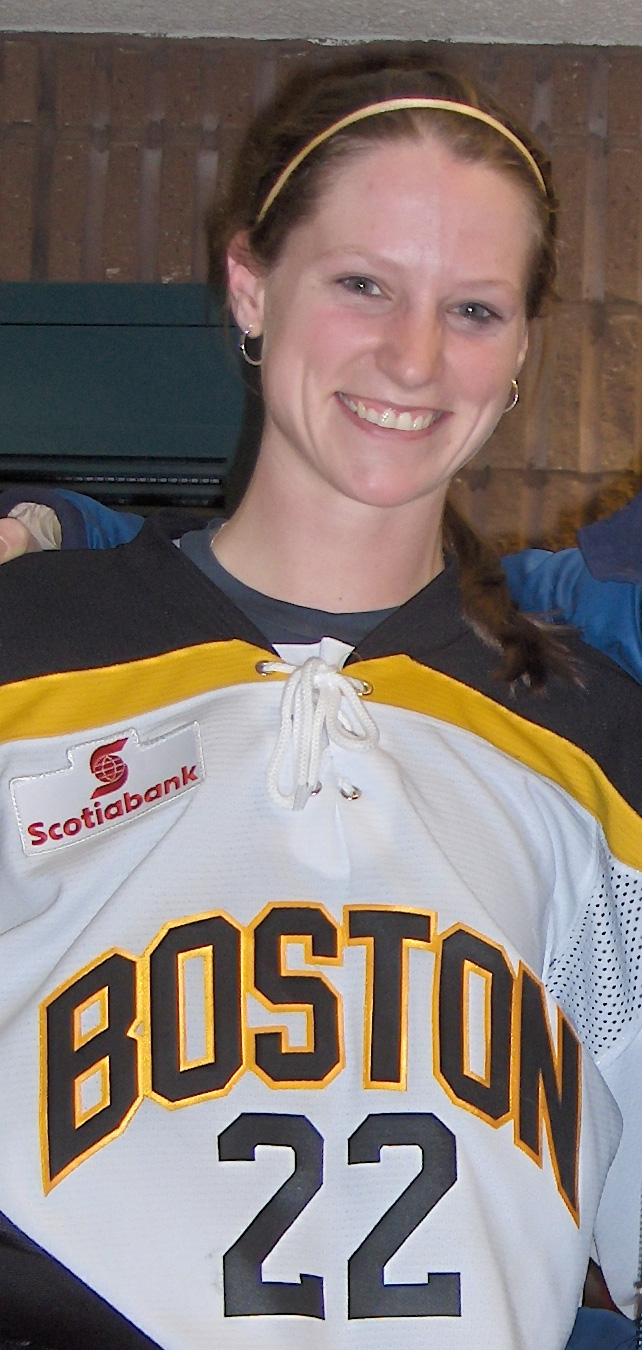
- Born: April 22, 1987 (age 39) Providence, Rhode Island, U.S.
- Height: 5 ft 7 in (170 cm)
- Weight: 146 lb (66 kg; 10 st 6 lb)
- Position: Defense
- Shoots: Left
- PWHPA team Former teams: Calgary: Calgary Inferno; Boston Pride; Boston Blades; New Hampshire Wildcats
- National team: United States
- Playing career: 2005–present
Medal record
Olympic Games
Gold medal – first place	2018 Pyeongchang	Team
Silver medal – second place	2010 Vancouver	Team
Silver medal – second place	2014 Sochi	Team
World Championships
Gold medal – first place	2008 China
Gold medal – first place	2009 Finland
Gold medal – first place	2011 Switzerland
Gold medal – first place	2013 Canada
Gold medal – first place	2015 Sweden
Gold medal – first place	2016 Canada
Gold medal – first place	2017 United States
Gold medal – first place	2019 Finland
Silver medal – second place	2012 United States
Silver medal – second place	2021 Canada

Kacey Lee Bellamy (born April 22, 1987) is a former American ice hockey defender for the Calgary section of the PWHPA, an Olympic Gold medalist, and seven-time IIHF World Women's Championship winner. She also played for the Boston Pride in the Premier Hockey Federation and the United States women's national ice hockey team. She won the Isobel Cup with the Pride and is a two-time Clarkson Cup champion with the Boston Blades of the Canadian Women's Hockey League.

== Early life and college ==
Bellamy grew up in Westfield, Massachusetts, and spent four years in Sheffield, Massachusetts at the Berkshire School and graduated in 2005, where she lettered in hockey, field hockey and softball. In her senior year, she was named team MVP and co-MVP of the New England Prep School Athletic Council Division I. She finished her hockey career with 30 goals and 80 assists. She was Berkshire's Female Athlete of the Year as a junior and senior.

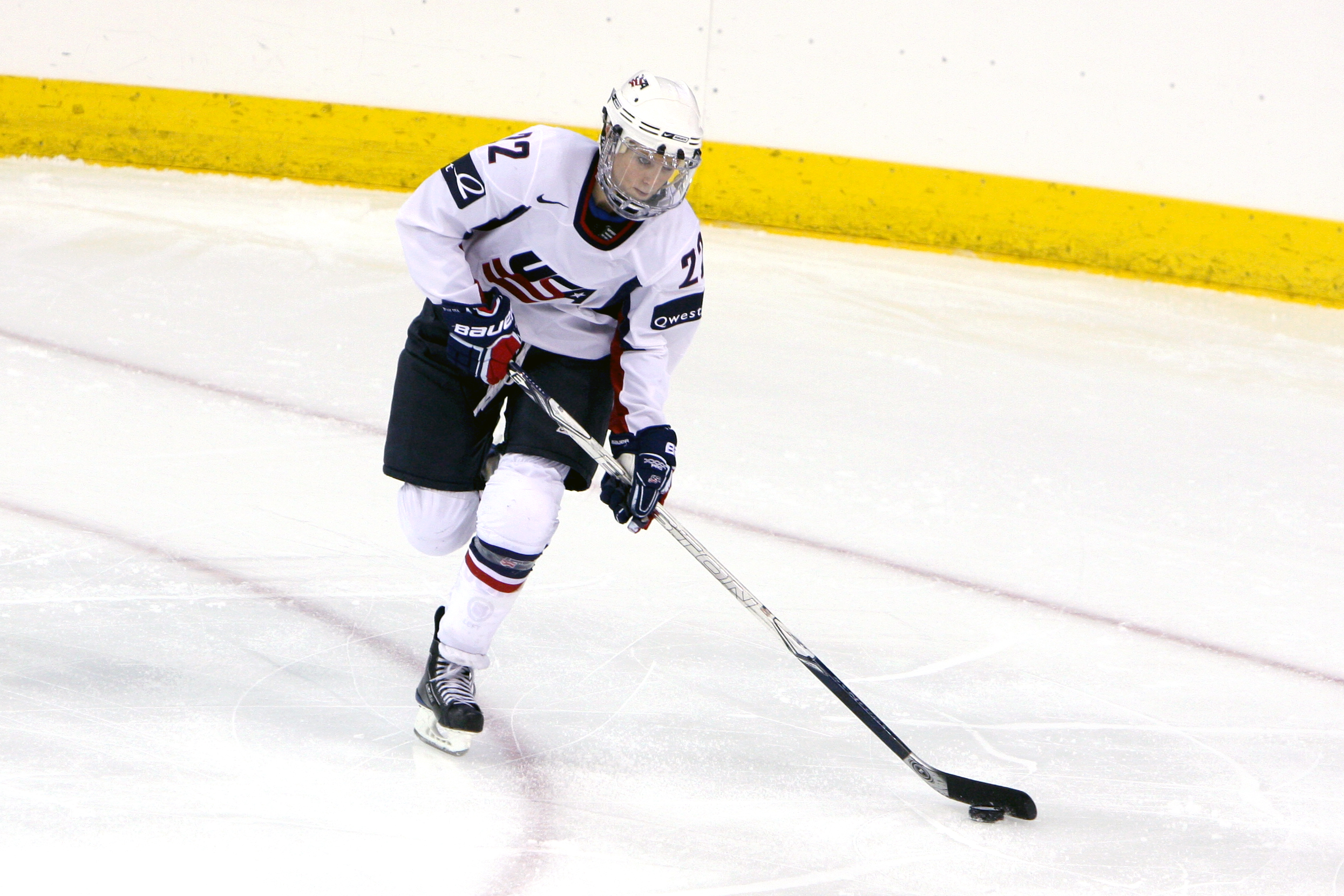

In 2009, Bellamy graduated from the University of New Hampshire with a bachelor's degree in women's studies.

=== New Hampshire Wildcats ===
Bellamy ranks third all-time at UNH in career points by a defenseman. As a Freshman, she led New Hampshire Blueliners in goals (9) and was second in both assists (16) and points (24). In her sophomore season, she ranked second among team defensemen and 10th among the nation's blueliners with 29 points (10 goals, 19 assists). In 2007–08 (junior year), she led all Wildcat defensemen with 26 points (3 goals, 23 assists) and ranked 10th in the nation with .74 points per game. In her senior year, (2008–09), she ranked fourth among NCAA Blueliners with 28 points (6 goals. 22 assists) in 35 games en route to being named to the RBK All-America First Team.

== Professional career ==
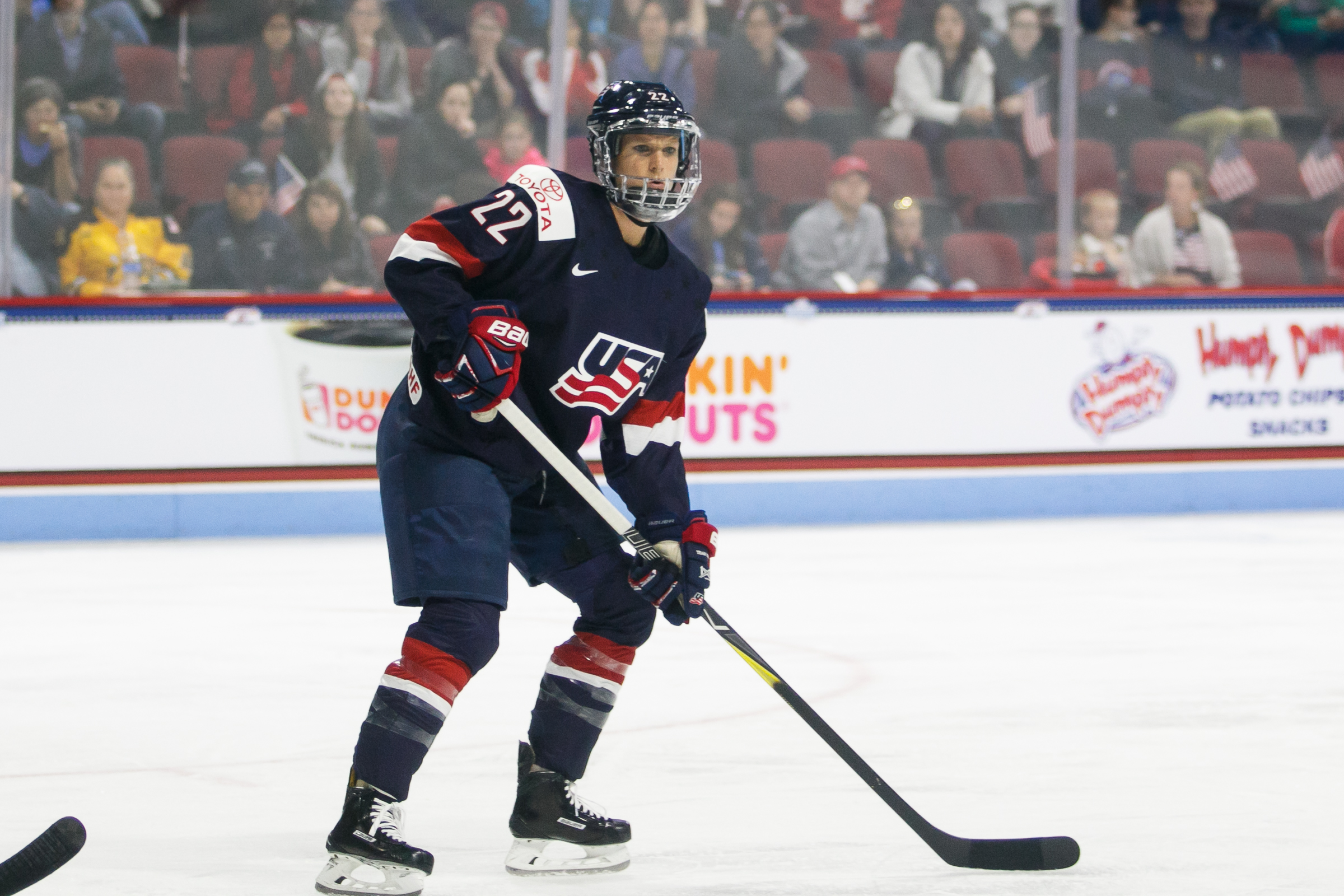
Kacey Bellamy playing for Team USA in 2017

=== USA Hockey ===
Bellamy is a two-time USA Hockey Player Development Camp attendee (2004–05). From 2006 to 2009, she was a four-time USA Hockey Women's National Festival participant. In addition, she was a two-time member of the United States Women's Under-22 Select Team. She was part of the United States Women's Select Team for the Four Nations Cup that finished first in 2008. She also played for the team when they had second-place finishes in 2006 and 2007. Bellamy was part of seven gold medal winning squads for the United States Women's National Team for the International Ice Hockey Federation World Women's Championship: 2008, 2009, 2011, 2013, 2015, 2016, 2017. For 2009 and 2015, she was named one of Team USA's top-three players. For 2017 Bellamy scored 2 goals in the IIHF world championship gold medal game against team Canada and was named US player of the game. She served as alternate captain for USA world championship teams in 2013, 2016, 2017, 2019 and 2021. Bellamy announced her retirement from USA Hockey in September 2021 after her heartbreaking loss to Team Canada in a gold medal game in 2021 IIHF Women's World Championship. She settled for Silver for the first time since 2012 and in her last hockey career.

=== Boston Blades ===
As a member of the Boston Blades, Bellamy was part of the club's first two Clarkson Cup triumphs; in 2013 and 2015. In addition, Bellamy participated in the 2014 CWHL All-Star Game.

=== Boston Pride ===
On September 22, 2015, it was announced that Bellamy had signed a contract with the Boston Pride of the National Women's Hockey League. In the Pride's inaugural match, a 4–1 win against the Buffalo Beauts, Kacey Bellamy would earn two assists, becoming the first blueliner in NWHL history to log a multi-point game.

=== Calgary Inferno ===
On July 24, 2018, Bellamy and fellow Team USA gold medalist Brianna Decker signed as free agents with the Calgary Inferno. Appearing in the 2019 Clarkson Cup Finals, Bellamy logged the assist on the game-winning goal, scored by Decker.

== Awards and honors ==
=== USA Hockey ===
- Two-time member of the U.S. Women's National Team for the International Ice Hockey Federation World Women's Championship (gold-2008–09)
- Named one of Team USA's top-three players in 2009
- Three-time member of the U.S. Women's Select Team for the Four Nations Cup (1st-2008, 2nd-2006–07)
- Two-time member of the U.S. Women's Under-22 Select Team for the Under-22 Series with Canada (2007–08). Led U.S. defensemen with two points (1–1) in 2008. Paced the team with four points (1–3) in 2007
- Four-time USA Hockey Women's National Festival participant (2006–09)
- Two-time USA Hockey Player Development Camp attendee (2004–05).

=== NCAA ===
- Played four years at the University of New Hampshire of Hockey East
- Ranks third all-time at UNH in career points by a defenseman. As a Senior (2008–09): Ranked fourth among NCAA blueliners with 28 points (6–22) in 35 games en route to being named to the RBK All-America First Team
- Garnered Hockey East First Team All-Star honors and was named the Hockey East Tournament MVP, as well as earning a spot on the Hockey East All-Tournament Team
- Named UNH's Jim Urquhart Student-Athlete of the Year. As a Junior (2007–08): Hockey East Second Team All-Star
- Led all Wildcat defensemen with 26 points (3–23) and ranked 10th in the nation with .74 points per game. As a Sophomore (2006–07): Hockey East Second Team All-Star
- Named to the Hockey East RBK/CCM All-Tournament Team
- Ranked second among team defensemen and 10th among the nation's blueliners with 29 points (10–19). As a Freshman (2005–06): Named to the All-USCHO Rookie Team and the Hockey East RBK/CCM All-Tournament Team
- Led UNH blueliners in goals (8) and was second in both assists (16) and points (24).

==== NCAA honors ====
- All-USCHO Rookie Team, 2006
- Hockey East RBK/CCM All-Tournament Team, 2006
- Hockey East Second Team All-Star, 2007
- Hockey East RBK/CCM All-Tournament Team, 2007
- Hockey East Second Team All-Star, 2008
- RBK All-America First Team, 2009
- Hockey East First Team All-Star honors, 2009
- Hockey East Tournament MVP, 2009
- Hockey East All-Tournament Team, 2009
- UNH's Jim Urquhart Student-Athlete of the Year, 2009
- Best Defender, 2011 4 Nations Cup
- Hockey East 10th Anniversary Team selection

=== CWHL ===
- Third Star of the Game, 2019 Clarkson Cup

== Family life ==
Bellamy has two brothers, Rob and Corey, and one sister, Lindsey. Her brothers are also hockey players with Rob having played hockey at the University of Maine and was drafted by Philadelphia Flyers while Corey has skated for teams in the ECHL, Federal Hockey League, and Southern Professional Hockey League, following one season of collegiate hockey at Becker College. She is also a cousin of former Indianapolis Colts safety Jamie Silva.

== Career statistics ==
=== Club ===
			Regular Season					Playoffs
Season	Team	League	GP	G	A	Pts	PIM	GP	G	A	Pts	PIM
2005–06	University of New Hampshire	NCAA	37	8	16	24	26	—	—	—	—	—
2006–07	University of New Hampshire	NCAA	36	10	19	29	22	—	—	—	—	—
2007–08	University of New Hampshire	NCAA	35	3	23	26	54	—	—	—	—	—
2008–09	University of New Hampshire	NCAA	35	6	22	28	34	—	—	—	—	—
2010–11	Boston Blades	CWHL	25	2	13	15	33	—	—	—	—	—
2011–12	Boston Blades	CWHL	22	5	7	12	24	3	0	2	2	4
2012–13	Boston Blades	CWHL	24	1	8	9	22	4	0	3	3	12
2013–14	Boston Blades	CWHL	2	0	0	0	2	4	0	0	0	0
2014–15	Boston Blades	CWHL	18	2	9	11	16	3	0	1	1	6
2015–16	Boston Pride	NWHL	13	2	12	14	10	3	0	2	2	4
2016–17	Boston Pride	NWHL	17	3	6	9	10	2	0	4	4	0
CWHL Totals			91	10	37	47	97	14	0	6	6	22
NCAA Totals			143	27	80	107	136	—	—	—	—	—
NWHL Totals			37	5	18	23	20	5	0	6	6	4

=== International ===
Year	Team	Event	Result	GP	G	A	Pts	PIM
2008	United States	WC	1st place, gold medalist(s)	4	0	2	2	—
2009	United States	WC	1st place, gold medalist(s)	5	0	2	2	—
2010	United States	Oly	2nd place, silver medalist(s)	5	0	1	1	4
2011	United States	WC	1st place, gold medalist(s)	5	1	1	2	—
2012	United States	WC	2nd place, silver medalist(s)	5	0	1	1	—
2013	United States	WC	1st place, gold medalist(s)	5	0	1	1	—
2014	United States	Oly	2nd place, silver medalist(s)	5	1	1	2	2
2015	United States	WC	1st place, gold medalist(s)	4	1	1	2	0
2016	United States	WC	1st place, gold medalist(s)	4	0	2	2	0
2017	United States	WC	1st place, gold medalist(s)	5	2	3	5	4
2018	United States	Oly	1st place, gold medalist(s)	5	1	0	1	0
2019	United States	WC	1st place, gold medalist(s)	6	0	0	1	4
2021	United States	WC	2nd place, silver medalist(s)	5	0	1	1	—
Senior totals				58	6	15	21	14
