= Worcester Blades =

- City: Worcester, Massachusetts
- League: Canadian Women's Hockey League
- Founded: 2010
- Folded: 2019
- Home arena: Fidelity Bank Worcester Ice Center
- Colors: Black, gold, white
- General manager: Derek Alfama
- Head coach: Paul Kennedy
- Website: Worcester Blades Official website

Franchise history
- 2010–2018: Boston Blades
- 2018–2019: Worcester Blades

Championships
- Playoff championships: 2 (2013, 2015)

The Worcester Blades were a professional women's ice hockey team in the Canadian Women's Hockey League, based in Worcester, Massachusetts, and played their home games at the Fidelity Bank Worcester Ice Center. The team began play in the 2010–11 CWHL season as the Boston Blades where they won the Clarkson Cup twice, in 2013 and 2015.

After playing in several Boston-area arenas throughout its first eight seasons, the Blades moved to Worcester in 2018 and rebranded.

In 2019, the CWHL ceased operations, as well as all teams that it directly owned including the Blades.

== History ==
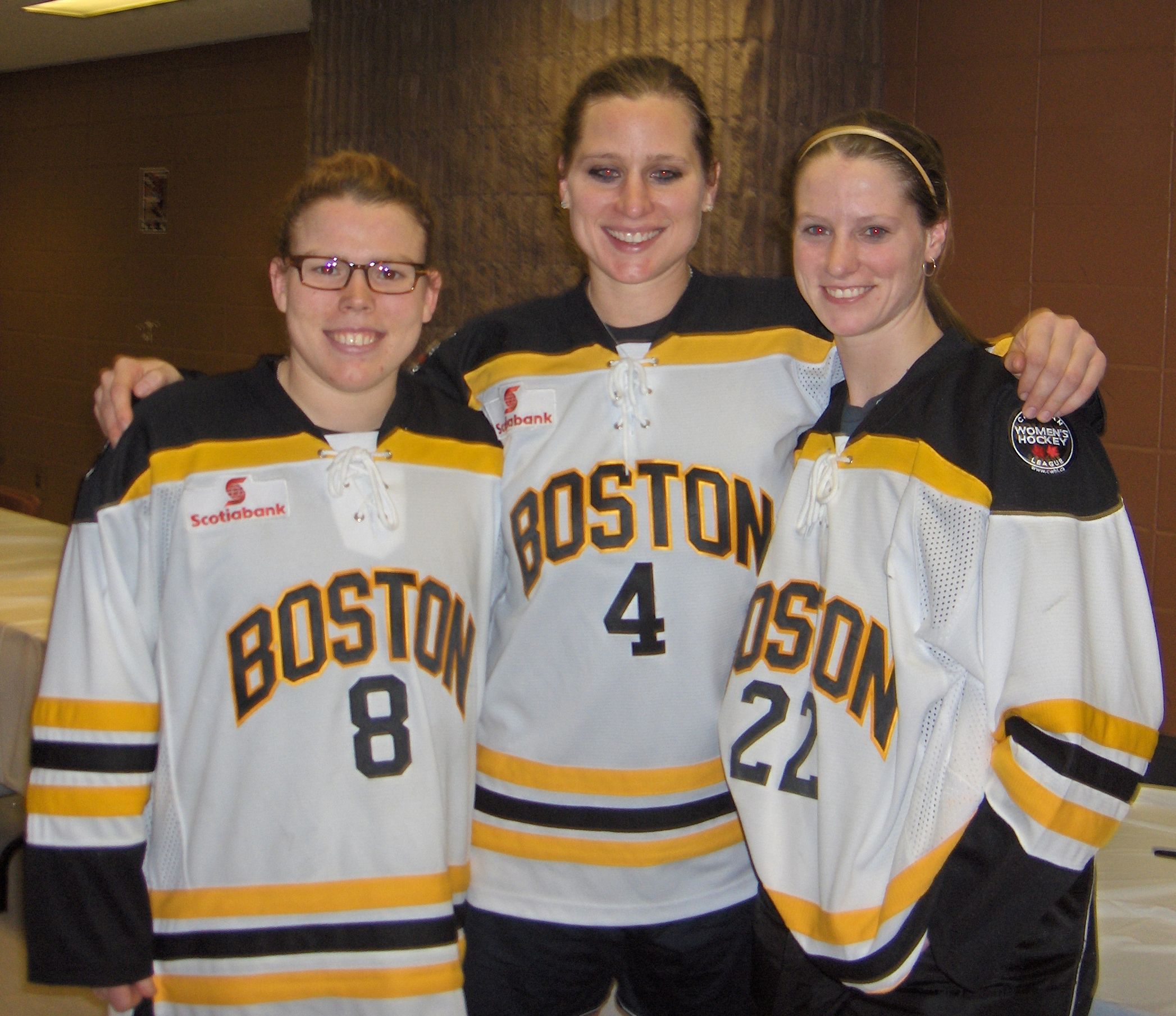
Boston Blades players: #8 Caitlin Cahow, #4 Angela Ruggiero and #22 Kacey Bellamy.

On August 12, 2010, the Canadian Women's Hockey League (CWHL) announced that Boston would be granted an expansion team for the 2010–11 CWHL season, making the Boston franchise the first CWHL team in the United States.

On September 14, 2010, retired goalkeeper Erin Whitten was named Boston's first head coach. An expansion draft was held to stock the team in August. Their most significant player was free agent signing Angela Ruggiero, a four-time Olympian.

The Boston Blades' inaugural season included 16 home games. Their first match, on October 30, 2010, ended with a 3–0 shutout victory over the Burlington Barracudas, with the team beginning the season with seven victories in their first twelve games. A seven-game losing streak ensued, and the Blades finished with a 10–16 record, still good enough for third place in the five team league. In the playoffs against the Toronto Aeros, the Blades lost 4–2 and 3–1, swept in the best-of-three series.

In the 2012–13 season, the Boston Blades were regular season champions and then became the second American-based team to capture the Clarkson Cup, which was the women's equivalent of the men's Stanley Cup, after the Minnesota Whitecaps. The Clarkson Cup is named after Canada's former Governor General, Adrienne Clarkson, and used to be played for between all Canadian women's leagues. The Blades beat the rival Montreal Stars for the clinching victory. Hilary Knight was named CWHL MVP, Genevieve Lacasse Best Goalie, and Digit Murphy Coach of the Year.

In the penultimate game of the regular season in 2013–14, Jessica Koizumi became the first player to register 50 career points with the Blades franchise.

In the 2014–15 season, the Blades finished the regular season with the best record in the CWHL at 15–2–1–6. During the season, the league held its 1st Canadian Women's Hockey League All-Star Game, with Digit Murphy serving as the winning coach for Team Red. In the first round of the Clarkson Cup playoffs, the Blades were matched against the fourth seeded Toronto Furies. The best-of-three series ended in a sweep for the Blades with 3–0 and 7–3 victories.

On March 7, 2015, the Boston Blades faced the Montreal Stars for the Clarkson Cup, their second appearance in the Clarkson Cup finals in three years. Both the Blades and Stars tallied goals in the first and third periods. Hillary Knight and Brianna Decker were the lone goal scorers in regulation for the Blades. Regulation ended with the score tied at 2–2, requiring an overtime period to decide a winner. Janine Weber scored the series-clinching goal on a pass from her former college roommate Corinne Buie, 2:12 in the overtime period earning the Blades their second Clarkson Cup.

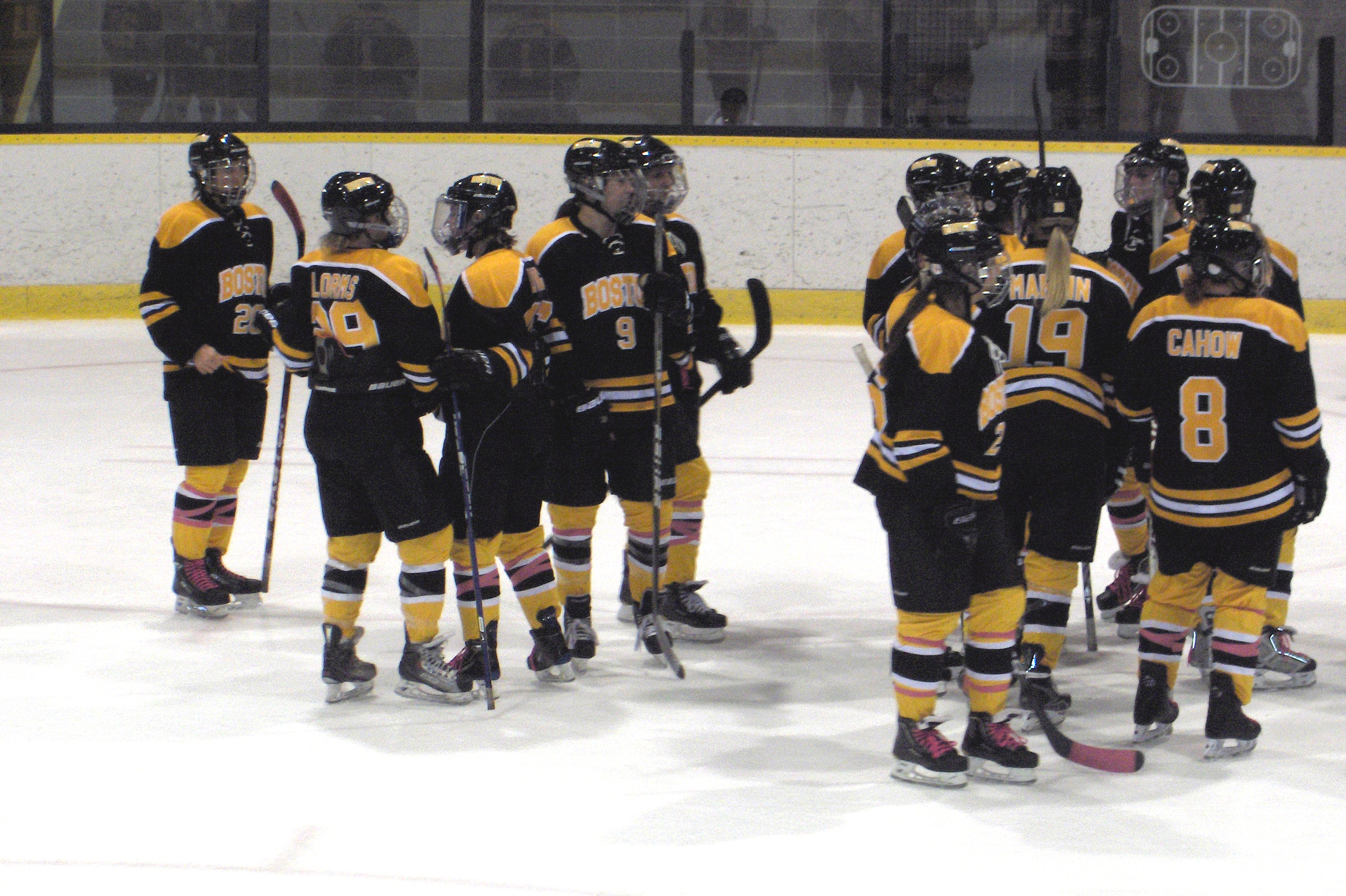
Nine players of United States women's national ice hockey team were rostered on the Boston Blades for 2011–12 CWHL season.

Following the 2015 season, the National Women's Hockey League was established, adding its own team in Boston, the Boston Pride. Soon after, all U.S. national team players on the Blades moved to the Pride, leaving the Blades to have to rebuild from the ground up.

The Blades competed with the Pride for Boston fans until 2018 when the team relocated an hour away to Worcester and were rebranded as the Worcester Blades on August 20, 2018, playing out of the Fidelity Bank Worcester Ice Center for the 2018–19 CWHL season.

== Season-by-season records ==
Year	GP	W	L	OTL	SOL	GF	GA	Pts	Finish	Playoffs
2010–11	26	10	15	1	0	73	101	21	3rd	Lost first round of 2011 Clarkson Cup playoffs, 0–2 vs. Toronto Furies
2011–12	27	20	7	0	0	107	61	46	2nd	Did not qualify
2012–13	24	19	4	0	1	72	39	39	1st	Won 2013 Clarkson Cup championship game, 5–2 vs. Montreal Stars
2013–14	24	13	11	0	0	77	71	26	2nd	Lost 2014 Clarkson Cup championship game, 0–1 (OT) vs. Toronto Furies
2014–15	24	17	6	0	1	94	43	35	1st	Won 2015 Clarkson Cup championship game, 3–2 (OT) vs. Montreal Stars
2015–16	24	1	23	0	0	18	122	2	5th	Did not qualify
2016–17	24	2	20	1	1	32	137	6	5th	Did not qualify
2017–18	28	1	24	0	3	41	120	5	7th	Did not qualify
2018–19	28	0	28	0	0	22	155	0	6th	Did not qualify

== Notable former players ==
- (United States) Angela Ruggiero
- (United States) Kelli Stack
- (United States) Kacey Bellamy
- (United States) Caitlin Cahow
- (United States) Meghan Duggan
- (United States) Kacey Bellamy
- (United States) Nicole Giannino
- (United States) Molly Engstrom
- (Canada) Kaleigh Fratkin
- (United States) Blake Bolden
- (Canada) Jaclyn Hawkins
- (United States) Brianna Decker
- (United States) Hilary Knight
- (Canada) Genevieve Lacasse
- (United States) Erika Lawler
- (United States) Gigi Marvin
- (United States) Molly Schaus
- (United States) Anne Schleper
- (United States) Kelli Stack
- (United States) Kelley Steadman
- (United States) Karen Thatcher
- (Canada) Tara Watchorn

== Scoring leaders ==
=== Season-by-season ===
Season	Leader (F)	GP	G	A	Pts	Leader (D)	GP	G	A	Pts	PPG	SHG	GWG
2010–11	Sam Faber	23	15	15	30	Angela Ruggiero	22	11	15	26	Ruggiero (6)	Faber (2)	Jessica Koizumi (3)
2011–12	Kelli Stack	27	25	17	42	Kacey Bellamy	22	5	7	12	Stack (4)	Erika Lawler and Kacey Bellamy (1)	Gigi Marvin (4)
2012–13	Hilary Knight	24	17	15	32	Anne Schleper	24	2	13	15	Knight (3)	Karen Thatcher (1)	Knight (5)
2013–14	Jillian Dempsey	24	14	14	28	Blake Bolden	23	5	14	19	Dempsey (5)	Casey Pickett (2)	Four tied with 2
2014–15	Brianna Decker	12	16	16	32	Tara Watchorn	21	6	14	20	Decker (6)		Decker and Watchorn (2)
2015–16	Megan Myers	17	4	3	7	Tara Watchorn	23	2	4	6	Seven tied with 1*	None	Kristina Brown (1) scored in shootout
2016–17	Kate Leary	24	10	6	16								

== All-time scoring leaders ==
Player	GP	G	A	Pts	Seasons
Jessica Koizumi	66	27	28	55	2010–15
Hilary Knight	38	25	28	53	2012–15
Kelli Stack	39	31	22	53	2011–13

== Awards & honors ==
- Hilary Knight, 2013 CWHL Player of the Year
- Genevieve Lacasse, 2013 CWHL Goaltender of the Year
- Jillian Dempsey, 2014 CWHL Rookie of the Year
- Jillian Dempsey, 2013–14 Leading scorer among CWHL rookies
- Brianna Decker, CWHL Rookie of the Year (2014–15)
- Jillian Dempsey, 2014–15 Leading scorer among CWHL rookies
- Tara Watchorn, CWHL Defender of the Year (2014–15)

=== Team honors ===
- First overall, CWHL standings (2012–13)
- First overall, CWHL standings (2014–15)
