= List of Buffalo Beauts records =

This is a list of franchise records for the Buffalo Beauts of the Premier Hockey Federation.

== Regular season ==
=== All players ===
==== Points ====
Player	Ctry	Pos	GP	Pts
Kelley Steadman	(United States)	F	13	20
Kourtney Kunichika	(United States)	F	18	17
Meghan Duggan	(United States)	F	15	16
Devon Skeats	(Canada)	F	15	14
Megan Bozek	(United States)	D	16	13

==== Goals ====
Player	Ctry	Pos	GP	G
Kelley Steadman	(United States)	F	13	13
Devon Skeats	(Canada)	F	15	9
Kourtney Kunichika	(United States)	F	18	9
Meghan Duggan	(United States)	F	15	6
Harrison Browne	(Canada)	F	18	5

==== Assists ====
Player	Ctry	Pos	GP	A
Emily Pfalzer	(United States)	D	17	10
Megan Bozek	(United States)	D	16	10
Meghan Duggan	(United States)	F	15	10
Kelly McDonald	(Canada)	D	16	9
Kourtney Kunichika	(United States)	F	15	8

==== Games played ====
Player	Ctry	Pos	GP
Harrison Browne	(Canada)	F	18
Hannah McGowan	(United States)	F	18
Kourtney Kunichika	(United States)	F	18
Paige Harrington	(United States)	D	18
Emily Pfalzer	(United States)	D	17

==== Penalty minutes ====
Player	Ctry	Pos	GP	PIM
Harrison Browne	(Canada)	F	18	26
Devon Skeats	(Canada)	F	15	26
Kelley Steadman	(United States)	F	13	16
Hayley Williams	(Canada)	F	17	14
Meghan Duggan	(United States)	F	15	14

==== Game-winning goals ====
Player	Ctry	Pos	GWG
Devon Skeats	(Canada)	F	1
Megan Bozek	(United States)	D	1
Meghan Duggan	(United States)	F	1
Shelby Bram	(Canada)	F	1
Kourtney Kunichika	(United States)	F	0

==== Power-play goals ====
Player	Ctry	Pos	PP
Kelley Steadman	(United States)	F	5
Kourtney Kunichika	(United States)	F	4
Devon Skeats	(Canada)	F	2
Harrison Browne	(Canada)	F	2
Megan Bozek	(United States)	D	1

==== Short-handed goals ====
Player	Ctry	Pos	SH
Kelley Steadman	(United States)	F	2
Harrison Browne	(Canada)	F	1
Hannah McGowan	(United States)	F	1
Kourtney Kunichika	(United States)	F	1
Meghan Duggan	(United States)	F	1

=== Defensemen ===
==== Points ====
Player	Ctry	GP	Pts
Megan Bozek	(United States)	16	13
Emily Pfalzer	(United States)	17	12
Kelly McDonald	(Canada)	17	9
Paige Harrington	(United States)	18	3
Lindsay Grigg	(Canada)	15	2

=== Goaltenders ===
==== Games played ====
Player	Ctry	GP
Brianne McLaughlin	(United States)	12
Amanda Makela	(Canada)	6
Kimberly Sass	(United States)	2

==== Wins ====
Player	Ctry	GP	W
Brianne McLaughlin	(United States)	14	4
Amanda Makela	(Canada)	6	1
Kimberly Sass	(United States)	2	1

*Minimum of 60 minutes played for a goaltender

==== Shutouts ====
Player	Ctry	GP	SO
Brianne McLaughlin	(United States)	14	0
Amanda Makela	(Canada)	6	0
Kimberly Sass	(United States)	2	0

*Minimum of 60 minutes played for a goaltender

==== Goals against average ====
Player	Ctry	GP	GAA
Amanda Makela	(Canada)	6	2.79
Brianne McLaughlin	(United States)	12	3.48
Kimberly Sass	(United States)	2	4.64

*Minimum of 60 minutes played for a goaltender

==== Save percentage ====
Player	Ctry	GP	SV%
Amanda Makela	(Canada)	6	.909
Brianne McLaughlin	(United States)	14	.905
Kimberly Sass	(United States)	2	.863

*Minimum of 60 minutes played for a goaltender

== Playoffs ==
=== All players ===
==== Points ====
Player	Ctry	Pos	GP	Pts
Kelley Steadman	(United States)	F	0	0
Kourtney Kunichika	(United States)	F	0	0
Meghan Duggan	(United States)	F	0	0
Devon Skeats	(Canada)	F	0	0
Harrison Browne	(Canada)	F	0	0

==== Goals ====
Player	Ctry	Pos	GP	G
Kelley Steadman	(United States)	F	0	0
Kourtney Kunichika	(United States)	F	0	0
Meghan Duggan	(United States)	F	0	0
Devon Skeats	(Canada)	F	0	0
Harrison Browne	(Canada)	F	0	0

==== Assists ====
Player	Ctry	Pos	GP	A
Kelley Steadman	(United States)	F	0	0
Kourtney Kunichika	(United States)	F	0	0
Meghan Duggan	(United States)	F	0	0
Devon Skeats	(Canada)	F	0	0
Harrison Browne	(Canada)	F	0	0

==== Games played ====
Player	Ctry	Pos	GP
Kelley Steadman	(United States)	F	0
Kourtney Kunichika	(United States)	F	0
Meghan Duggan	(United States)	F	0
Devon Skeats	(Canada)	F	0
Harrison Browne	(Canada)	F	0

==== Penalty minutes ====
Player	Ctry	Pos	GP	PIM
Kelley Steadman	(United States)	F	0	0
Kourtney Kunichika	(United States)	F	0	0
Meghan Duggan	(United States)	F	0	0
Devon Skeats	(Canada)	F	0	0
Harrison Browne	(Canada)	F	0	0

==== Game-winning goals ====
Player	Ctry	Pos	GWG
Kelley Steadman	(United States)	F	0
Kourtney Kunichika	(United States)	F	0
Meghan Duggan	(United States)	F	0
Devon Skeats	(Canada)	F	0
Harrison Browne	(Canada)	F	0

==== Power play goals ====
Player	Ctry	Pos	PP
Kelley Steadman	(United States)	F	0
Kourtney Kunichika	(United States)	F	0
Meghan Duggan	(United States)	F	0
Devon Skeats	(Canada)	F	0
Harrison Browne	(Canada)	F	0

==== Short-handed goals ====
Player	Ctry	Pos	SH
Kelley Steadman	(United States)	F	0
Kourtney Kunichika	(United States)	F	0
Meghan Duggan	(United States)	F	0
Devon Skeats	(Canada)	F	0
Harrison Browne	(Canada)	F	0

=== Defensemen ===
==== Points ====
Player	Ctry	GP	Pts
Emily Pfalzer	(United States)	0	0
Megan Bozek	(United States)	0	0
Kelly McDonald	(Canada)	0	0
Lindsay Grigg	(Canada)	0	0
Paige Harrington	(United States)	0	0

=== Goaltenders ===
==== Games played ====
Player	Ctry	GP
Brianne McLaughlin	(United States)	0
Amanda Makela	(Canada)	0
Kimberly Sass	(United States)	0

*Minimum of 60 minutes played for a goaltender

==== Wins ====
Player	Ctry	GP	W
Brianne McLaughlin	(United States)	0	0
Amanda Makela	(Canada)	0	0
Kimberly Sass	(United States)	0	0

==== Goals against average ====
Player	Ctry	GP	GAA
Brianne McLaughlin	(United States)	0	0.00
Amanda Makela	(Canada)	0	0.00
Kimberly Sass	(United States)	0	0.00

*Minimum of 60 minutes played for a goaltender

==== Save percentage ====
Player	Ctry	GP	SV%
Brianne McLaughlin	(United States)	0	1.000
Amanda Makela	(Canada)	0	1.000
Kimberly Sass	(United States)	0	1.000

*Minimum of 60 minutes played for a goaltender

==== Shutouts ====
Player	Ctry	GP	SO
Brianne McLaughlin	(United States)	0	0
Amanda Makela	(Canada)	0	0
Kimberly Sass	(United States)	0	0

*Minimum of 60 minutes played for a goaltender

== Franchise records ==
=== Franchise single season ===
Most points	14	2015-16
Most wins	5	2015-16
Most losses	9	2015-16
Most overtime losses	4	2015-16
Most goals for	56	2015-16
Most goals against	66	2015-16
Fewest points	14	2015-16
Fewest wins	5	2015-16
Fewest losses	9	2015-16
Fewest overtime losses	4	2015-16
Fewest goals for	56	2015-16
Fewest goals against	66	2015-16
Most penalty minutes	175	2015-16
Fewest penalty minutes	175	2015-16
Most shutouts	0	2015-16

=== Franchise single game ===
Most goals for	6	3 games (November 22, 2015) (December 5, 2015) (January 17, 2016)
Most goals against	7	2 games (November 22, 2015) (December 5, 2015)
Biggest goal differential (win)	+4	February 21, 2016 (final 5-1 NYR)
Biggest goal differential (loss)	-4	December 27, 2015 (final 7-3 NYR)
Most shots for	46	January 31, 2016 (vs NYR)
Least shots for	22	February 7, 2016 (vs CTW)
Most shots against	50	October 25, 2015 (vs BOS)
Least shots against	19	February 21, 2016 (vs NYR)
Most penalty minutes	20	January 17, 2016 (vs NYR)
Longest game	65:00 + 3 round of shootout	4 times

=== Streaks ===
Winning streaks
Overall	2	January 17, 2016 - January 31, 2016
Home	1	Jan 31, 2016
Away	1	4 times (Pres)
Losing streaks
Overall	4	October 11, 2015 - November 25, 2015
Home	4	October 11, 2015 - November 25, 2015
Away	3	February 7, 2016 - March 4, 2016
Winless streaks
Overall	5	Oct 11, 2015 - Nov 22, 2015 (4L, 1OTL)
Home	6	Oct 11, 2015 - Dec 27, 2015 (5L, 1OTL)
Away	3	Dec 5, 2015 - Dec 20, 2015 (2L, 1OTL)

== Individual records ==
=== Career leaders ===
All-time leaders
Games	18	Multi-players
Games (defenseman)	18	Paige Harrington
Consecutive games	18	Multi-players
Points	20	Kelley Steadman
Points (defenseman)	13	Megan Bozek
Goals	13	Kelley Steadman
Goals (defenseman)	3	Megan Bozek
Power play goals	5	Kelley Steadman
Power play goals (defenseman)	1	Megan Bozek
Shorthanded goals	2	Kelley Steadman
Game winning goals	1	4 players
Overtime goals	1	Megan Bozek
Hat tricks	1	Devon Skeats
Assists	10	3 players
Assists (defenseman)	10	Emily Pfalzer and Megan Bozek
Shots	78	Kelley Steadman
Penalty minutes	26	Harrison Browne and Devon Skeats
Goaltender games	12	Brianne McLaughlin
Goaltender minutes	621	Brianne McLaughlin
Goaltender wins	3	Brianne McLaughlin
Shutouts	0	Brianne McLaughlin
Goals against average	2.60	Amanda Makela
Save percentage	0.908	Brianne McLaughlin
Coaching wins	5	Shelley Looney

*Minimum of 60 minutes played for goaltenders

=== Single season leaders ===
All-time leaders
Points	20	Kelley Steadman (2015–16)
Points (defenseman)	9	Emily Pfalzer (2015-16)
Points (rookie)	0	
Goals	13	Kelley Steadman (2015-16)
Goals (defenseman)	3	Megan Bozek (2015-16)
Goals (rookie)	0	
Power play goals	5	Kelley Steadman (2015-16)
Power play goals (defenseman)	1	Megan Bozek (2015-16)
Shorthanded goals	2	Kelley Steadman (2015-16)
Game winning goals	1	4 players (2015-16)
Overtime goals	1	Megan Bozek (2015-16)
Hat tricks	1	Devon Skeats (2015-16)
Assists	10	3 players (2015-16)
Assists (defenseman)	10	Emily Pfalzer and Megan Bozek (2015-16)
Assists (rookie)	0	
Shots	78	Kelley Steadman (2015-16)
Penalty minutes	26	Harrison Browne and Devon Skeats (2015-16)
Goaltender games	14	Brianne McLaughlin (2015-16)
Goaltender minutes	724	Brianne McLaughlin (2015-16)
Goaltender wins	4	Brianne McLaughlin (2015-16)
Shutouts	0	Brianne McLaughlin (2015-16)
Goals against average	2.79	Amanda Makela (2015-16)
Save percentage	0.909	Amanda Makela (2015-16)

*Minimum of 60 minutes played for goaltenders

=== Individual single game leaders ===
Player(s)
Points (single player)	4	3 times
Points (defenseman)	2	2 times
Points (rookie)	0	
Goals	3	Devon Skeats
Goals (defenseman)	1	3 times
Goals (rookie)	0	
Power play goals	2	2 times
Shorthanded goals	1	5 times
Assists	3	2 times
Assists (defenseman)	2	2 times
Assists (rookie)	0	
Shots (game)	12	Kelley Steadman
Penalty minutes	5	Megan Bozek
Goaltender shots faced (game)	49	Brianne McLaughlin
Goaltender saves	45	Brianne McLaughlin

¹ NWHL record

== See also ==
- PHF awards
- List of Boston Pride records
- List of Connecticut Whale (PHF) records
- List of Minnesota Whitecaps records
- List of PHF records (individual)
