= 2015–16 Buffalo Beauts season =

2015–16 Buffalo Beauts
- League: 3rd NWHL
- 2015–16 record: 5–9–4
- Home record: 2–6–1
- Road record: 3–3–3
- Goals for: 56
- Goals against: 66

Team information
- General manager: Linda Mroz
- Coach: Shelley Looney
- Captain: Emily Pfalzer
- Alternate captains: Shelby Bram; Meghan Duggan
- Arena: HarborCenter

Team leaders
- Goals: Kelley Steadman (13)
- Assists: Meghan Duggan (10); Megan Bozek; Emily Pfalzer
- Points: Kelley Steadman (20)
- Penalty minutes: Devon Skeats (26); Harrison Browne
- Wins: Brianne McLaughlin (4)
- Goals against average: Amanda Makela (2.79)

The 2015–16 Buffalo Beauts season was the first in franchise history and the National Women's Hockey League's inaugural season.

== Regular season ==
=== Standings ===
Pos	Team	GP	W	L	OTL	W%	GF	GA	GD	Pts
1	y – Boston Pride	18	14	3	1	0.806	75	39	+36	29
2	Connecticut Whale	18	13	5	0	0.722	61	51	+10	26
3	Buffalo Beauts	18	5	9	4	0.389	56	66	−10	14
4	New York Riveters	18	4	12	2	0.278	40	76	−36	10

Source: PHF
y – Clinched division

=== Game log ===
2015–16 Schedule

Game	Date	Opponent	Score	OT	Decision	Location	Record	Points	Gamesheet
1	October 11	Boston Pride	1–4		McLaughlin	HarborCenter	0–1–0	0	
2	October 18	Connecticut Whale	2–5		McLaughlin	HarborCenter	0–2–0	0	
3	October 25	Boston Pride	3–5		McLaughlin	HarborCenter	0–3–0	0	
4	November 15	Connecticut Whale	2–3		Sass	HarborCenter	0–4–0	0	
5	November 22	Connecticut Whale	6–7	SO	Makela	HarborCenter	0–4–1	1	
6	November 29	@ New York Riveters	3–1		McLaughlin	Aviator Sports and Events Center	1–4–1	3	
7	December 5	@ Boston Pride	6–7		McLaughlin	Bright Hockey Center	1–5–1	3	
8	December 6	@ Connecticut Whale	2–3	SO	Makela	Chelsea Piers CT	1–5–2	4	
9	December 20	@ Boston Pride	0–1		McLaughlin	Bright Hockey Center	1–6–2	4	
10	December 27	New York Riveters	3–7		McLaughlin	HarborCenter	1–7–2	4	
11	January 3	@ Boston Pride	4–3	OT	Makela	Bright Hockey Center	2–7–2	6	
12	January 10	@ Connecticut Whale	3–5		Makela	Chelsea Piers CT	2–8–2	6	
13	January 17	@ New York Riveters	6–5	SO	Sass	Aviator Sports and Events Center	3–8–2	8	
14	January 31	New York Riveters	4–2		McLaughlin	HarborCenter	4–8–2	10	
15	February 7	@ Connecticut Whale	2–3	OT	McLaughlin	Chelsea Piers CT	4–8–3	11	
16	February 14	@ New York Riveters	3–4	SO	McLaughlin	Aviator Sports and Events Center	4–8–4	12	
17	February 21	New York Riveters	5–1		McLaughlin	HarborCenter	5–8–4	14	
18	February 28	Boston Pride	2–3		McLaughlin	HarborCenter	5–9–4	14	

Win (2 points) Overtime/Shootout loss (1 point) Loss (0 points)

== Playoffs ==
=== Game log ===
2016 Isobel Cup Playoffs
Semifinals vs. Connecticut Whale; Buffalo Beauts won series 2–1

Game	Date	Opponent	Score	OT	Decision	Location	Record	Gamesheet
1	March 4	@ Connecticut Whale	0–3			Chelsea Piers CT	0–1	(No gamesheet available)
2	March 5	@ Connecticut Whale	4–1			Chelsea Piers CT	1–1	(No gamesheet available)
3	March 6	@ Connecticut Whale	4–3		McLaughlin	Chelsea Piers CT	2–1	

Finals vs. Boston Pride; Boston won series 2–0

Game	Date	Opponent	Score	OT	Decision	Location	Record	Gamesheet
1	March 11	Boston Pride	3–4	OT	McLaughlin	Prudential Center Practice Facility	0–1	
2	March 12	Boston Pride	1–3		McLaughlin	Prudential Center Practice Facility	0–2	

Win Loss

== Statistics ==
Updated as of games played through March 6, 2016

=== Skaters ===
Regular season
Player	GP	G	A	Pts	PIM
Kelley Steadman	13	13	7	20	16
Kourtney Kunichika	18	9	8	17	4
Meghan Duggan	15	6	10	16	14
Devon Skeats	15	9	5	14	26
Megan Bozek	16	3	10	13	13
Emily Pfalzer	17	2	10	12	6
Harrison Browne	18	5	7	12	26
Shelby Bram	16	4	6	10	0
Kelly Mcdonald	17	0	9	9	8
Erin Zach	14	1	4	5	4
Hayley Williams	17	1	4	5	14
Hannah McGowan	18	1	2	3	4
Paige Harrington	18	0	3	3	12
Tatiana Rafter	17	2	1	3	12
Jessica Fickel	15	0	2	2	4
Lindsay Grigg	15	0	2	2	6
Annemarie Cellino	9	0	1	1	0
Courtney Carnes	9	0	0	0	0
Maggie Giamo	9	0	0	0	4

Playoffs
Player	GP	G	A	Pts	PIM
Devon Skeats	3	2	1	3	0
Megan Bozek	3	3	0	3	4
Harrison Browne	3	2	0	2	6
Kelley Steadman	2	1	1	2	4
Kelly Mcdonald	3	0	2	2	4
Emily Pfalzer	3	0	1	1	2
Kourtney Kunichika	3	0	1	1	2
Lindsay Grigg	3	0	1	1	6
Meghan Duggan	1	0	1	1	2
Shelby Bram	3	0	1	1	0
Annemarie Cellino	1	0	0	0	0
Courtney Carnes	1	0	0	0	0
Erin Zach	3	0	0	0	0
Hannah McGowan	3	0	0	0	2
Hayley Williams	1	0	0	0	0
Jessica Fickel	3	0	0	0	0
Paige Harrington	3	0	0	0	2
Tatiana Rafter	3	0	0	0	0

=== Goaltenders ===
Regular season
Player	GP	TOI	W	L	OT	GA	GAA	SA	SV%	SO	PIM
Brianne McLaughlin	14	721:59	4	6	2	41	3.41	443	0.907	0	0
Amanda Makela	6	322:52	1	2	2	15	2.79	165	0.909	0	0
Kimberly Sass	2	90:30	1	1	0	7	4.64	51	0.863	0	0

Playoffs
Player	GP	TOI	W	L	OT	GA	GAA	SA	SV%	SO	PIM
Brianne McLaughlin	3	177:15	2	1	0	6	2.03	85	0.929	0	0

== Roster ==
Player age at end of season, March 19, 2016.

No.	Nat	Player	Pos	S/G	Age	Acquired	Birthplace
9	(United States)	Megan Bozek	D	R	24	2015	Buffalo Grove, Illinois
13	(Canada)	Shelby Bram (A)	F	L	22	2015	Winnipeg, Manitoba
24	(Canada)	Harrison Browne	F	L	22	2015	Oakville, Ontario
5	(United States)	Courtney Carnes	F	R	25	2015	Winslow, Maine
15	(United States)	Annmarie Cellino	F	–	28–29	2015	West Seneca, New York
10	(United States)	Meghan Duggan (A)	F	R	28	2015	Danvers, Massachusetts
6	(Canada)	Jessica Fickel	F	R	23	2015	Fort Erie, Ontario
26	(United States)	Maggie Giamo	F	R	25	2015	Orchard Park, New York
23	(Canada)	Lindsay Grigg	D	R	22	2015	Oakville, Ontario
2	(United States)	Paige Harrington	D	L	22	2015	Mansfield, Massachusetts
36	(United States)	Kourtney Kunichika	F	R	24	2015	Fullerton, California
34	(Canada)	Amanda Makela	G	L	22	2015	Thunder Bay, Ontario
14	(Canada)	Kelly McDonald	D	R	24	2015	Ancaster, Ontario
12	(United States)	Hannah McGowan	F	L	23	2015	Redford, Michigan
29	(United States)	Brianne McLaughlin	G	L	28	2015	Sheffield, Ohio
7	(United States)	Emily Pfalzer (C)	D	R	22	2015	Getzville, New York
43	(Canada)	Tatiana Rafter	F	L	24	2015	Winnipeg, Manitoba
1	(United States)	Kimberly Sass	G	L	25	2015	East Amherst, New York
21	(Canada)	Devon Skeats	F	L	24	2015	Whitby, Ontario
3	(United States)	Kelley Steadman	F	R	25	2015	Plattsburgh, New York
77	(United States)	Hayley Williams	F	L	25	2015	Crete, Illinois
20	(Canada)	Erin Zach	F	L	24	2015	Elmira, Ontario

== Awards and honors ==
NWHL Player of the Week

- Kelley Steadman – November 23, 2015
- Devon Skeats – November 30, 2015
- Megan Bozek – January 3, 2016
- Brianne McLaughlin – January 17, 2016
- Kelley Steadman – January 31, 2016

NWHL 1st All-Star Game selection

- Megan Bozek (Team Pfalzer)
- Shelby Bram (Team Knight)
- Meghan Duggan (Team Pfalzer)
- Brianne McLaughlin (Team Knight)
- Devon Skeats (Team Pfalzer)
- Hayley Williams (Team Knight)

== Transactions ==
=== Signings ===
Player	Date	Contract terms
Brianne McLaughlin	July 1, 2015	$22,000
Devon Skeats	July 9, 2015	$15,000
Erin Zach	July 9, 2015	$13,000
Harrison Browne	August 6, 2015	$15,000
Kimberly Sass	August 6, 2015	$10,000
Shelby Bram	August 7, 2015	$15,000
Tatiana Rafter	August 7, 2015	$15,000
Paige Harrington	August 11, 2015	$10,000
Hayley Williams	August 11, 2015	$13,000
Amanda Makela	August 11, 2015	$15,000
Kourtney Kunichika	August 15, 2015	$10,000
Jessica Fickel	August 17, 2015	$15,000
Hannah McGowan	August 18, 2015	$10,000
Lindsay Grigg	July 13, 2015	$13,000
Kelly McDonald	July 13, 2015	$13,000
Emily Pfalzer	September 24, 2015	$21,000
Megan Bozek	September 25, 2015	$22,500
Meghan Duggan	September 25, 2015	$22,500

== Draft ==
The following were the Beauts selections in the 2015 NWHL Draft on June 20, 2015.

Round	#	Player	Pos	Nationality	College/Junior/Club team (League)
1	4	Courtney Burke	D	United States	University of Wisconsin (WCHA)
2	8	Sarah Lefort	F	Canada	Boston University (HEA)
3	12	Amanda Leveille	G	Canada	University of Minnesota (WCHA)
4	16	Emily Janiga	F	United States	Mercyhurst College (CHA)
5	20	Jenna Dingeldein	F	Canada	Mercyhurst College (CHA)
