= 2016–17 NWHL season =

- League: National Women's Hockey League
- Sport: Ice hockey

2016 draft
- Top draft pick: Kelsey Koelzer
- Picked by: New York Riveters

Regular season
- Season champions: Boston Pride
- Season MVP: Brianna Decker
- Top scorer: Brianna Decker

Isobel Cup
- Champions: Buffalo Beauts
- Runners-up: Boston Pride
- Finals MVP: Brianne McLaughlin

NWHL seasons
- 2015–16 2017–18

The 2016–17 NWHL season is the second season of operation of the National Women's Hockey League. All four teams from the inaugural season returned for this season: the Boston Pride, Buffalo Beauts, Connecticut Whale, and New York Riveters.

== League business ==
=== Team locations ===
During the off-season, the Connecticut Whale moved to Northford Ice Pavilion in North Branford, Connecticut, and the defending champion Boston Pride moved to the new Warrior Ice Arena in the Boston neighborhood of Brighton.

On August 1, 2016, it was announced that the New York Riveters moved from Brooklyn to the Barnabas Health Hockey House in Newark, New Jersey, situated within the Prudential Center as the New Jersey Devils practice arena. The facility was the site of the first Isobel Cup finals the previous season.

With the changes in arenas, it left the Buffalo Beauts, playing their second season at Harborcenter, as the sole team not to change arenas.

=== League news ===
- August 2, 2016: The league announced a partnership with You Can Play, which also saw each team feature an ambassador.
- August 4, 2016: The league announced that all four inaugural season jersey designs would be retired and replaced with new designs voted upon by fans.
- October 7, 2016: Buffalo Beauts player Harrison Browne became the first transgender athlete in professional North American team sports, asking to be referred to by the name Harrison. As the hormone treatments involved with gender transition violate anti-doping regulations, Browne would remain fully biologically female during his playing career. Browne initially retired at the end of the season to with plans to start a full transition, but returned to play for the Metropolitan Riveters the following season.
- November 17, 2016: Part way into the league's second season, the NWHL informed its players that they would all be getting up to a 50% pay cut. The league claims the pay cut is needed in order to sustain the longevity of the league. This dropped the league player minimums to $5,000 per player. Five weeks later, in an attempt to partially compensate for the salary rollback, the league introduced an incentive program where players from the home team split the revenue generated by tickets sold in excess of 500 after each game.
- February 3, 2017: The league announced that the season and playoffs would be shortened to accommodate for the players' participation in the 2017 IIHF Women's World Championship and preparations for the 2018 Olympic teams. The season was originally set to end on April 16, following a three-week break for the World Championships. The regular season was instead scheduled to end on March 12 and then followed by a single-game Isobel Cup playoff semifinals and final to be held March 17–19.

=== All-star game ===
The 2nd NWHL All-Star Game was held in Pittsburgh, Pennsylvania, the first NWHL game to be played outside of its four markets. Amanda Kessel and Kelley Steadman were named as All-Star captains. Kessel would go on to score the first hat trick in NWHL All-Star history.

== Regular season ==
=== Standings ===
	GP	W	L	OTL	GF	GA	PTS
Boston Pride	17	16	1	0	73	29	32
New York Riveters	18	8	7	3	55	58	19
Buffalo Beauts	17	6	10	1	44	68	13
Connecticut Whale	18	5	12	1	60	77	11

== Playoffs ==
Semifinal game
1	Boston Pride	8
4	Connecticut Whale	2
2	New York Riveters	2
3	Buffalo Beauts	4

Isobel Cup Championship
1	Boston Pride	2
3	Buffalo Beauts	3

== Statistics ==
=== Scoring leaders ===
- The following players led the league in regular season points at the conclusion of season.

Player	Team	GP	G	A	Pts
Brianna Decker	Boston Pride	17	14	17	31
Alex Carpenter	Boston Pride	17	9	20	29
Haley Skarupa	Connecticut Whale	16	11	11	22
Janine Weber	New York Riveters	17	10	12	22
Meghan Duggan	Boston Pride	17	13	7	20

== Awards and honors ==
- Brianna Decker, Boston Pride, 2017 NWHL Most Valuable Player
- Brianna Decker, Boston Pride, 2017 NWHL Scoring Champion
- Ashley Johnston, New York Riveters, 2017 NWHL Denna Laing Perseverance Award
- Megan Bozek, Buffalo Beauts, 2017 NWHL Defensive Player of the Year Award
- Katie Fitzgerald, New York Riveters, 2017 NWHL Goaltender of the Year

== Transactions ==
=== Draft ===
The logo of the 2016 NWHL draft

The 2016 NWHL Draft took place on June 18, 2016, and was the second in league history. Defender Kelsey Koelzer of Princeton was selected first overall by the New York Riveters.

Rd	P	Player (Pos)	Team	Nationality	Former team
1	1	Kelsey Koelzer (D)	New York Riveters	United States	Princeton University (ECAC)
1	2	Lee Stecklein (D)	Buffalo Beauts	United States	University of Minnesota (WCHA)
1	3	Dani Cameranesi (F)	Connecticut Whale	United States	University of Minnesota (WCHA)
1	4	Ann-Renee Desbiens (G)	Boston Pride	Canada	University of Wisconsin (WCHA)
2	5	Sydney Daniels (F)	New York Riveters	United States	Harvard University (ECAC)
2	6	Cayley Mercer (F)	Buffalo Beauts	Canada	Clarkson University (ECAC)
2	7	Andie Anastos (F)	Connecticut Whale	United States	Boston College (Hockey East)
2	8	Sarah Nurse (F)	Boston Pride	Canada	University of Wisconsin (WCHA)
3	9	Jenny Ryan (D)	New York Riveters	United States	University of Wisconsin (WCHA)
3	10	Hayley Scamurra (F)	Buffalo Beauts	United States	Northeastern University (HEA)
3	11	Mellissa Channell (D)	Connecticut Whale	Canada	University of Wisconsin (WCHA)
3	12	Ashleigh Brykaliuk (F)	Boston Pride	Canada	University of Minnesota Duluth (WCHA)
4	13	Sydney McKibbon (F)	New York Riveters	Canada	University of Wisconsin (WCHA)
4	14	Emma Woods (F)	Buffalo Beauts	Canada	Quinnipiac University (ECAC)
4	15	Paige Savage (F)	Connecticut Whale	United States	Northeastern (HEA)
4	16	Halli Krzyzaniak (D)	Boston Pride	Canada	University of North Dakota (ECAC)
5	17	Amy Menke (F)	New York Riveters	United States	University of North Dakota (WCHA)
5	18	Maddie Elia (F)	Buffalo Beauts	United States	Boston University (HEA)
5	19	Sydney Rossman (G)	Connecticut Whale	United States	Quinnipiac University (ECAC)
5	20	Lara Stalder (F)	Boston Pride	Switzerland	University of Minnesota Duluth (WCHA)

=== Free agency ===
Date	Player	New team
April 4, 2016	Kelly Babstock	Connecticut Whale
April 6, 2016	Morgan Fritz-Ward	New York Riveters
April 6, 2016	Madison Packer	New York Riveters
April 11, 2016	Paige Harrington	Buffalo Beauts
April 12, 2016	Ashley Johnston	New York Riveters
April 12, 2016	Kiira Dosdall	New York Riveters
April 20, 2016	Jordan Smelker	Boston Pride
April 26, 2016	Jillian Dempsey	Boston Pride
April 27, 2016	Alyssa Gagliardi	Boston Pride
April 28, 2016	Bray Ketchum	New York Riveters
April 28, 2016	Amanda Leveille	Buffalo Beauts
April 28, 2016	Miye D'Oench	New York Riveters
April 30, 2016	Sam Faber	Connecticut Whale
May 1, 2016	Kaleigh Fratkin	New York Riveters
May 1, 2016	Jaimie Leonoff	New York Riveters
May 1, 2016	Amanda Kessel	New York Riveters
May 2, 2016	Lexi Bender	Boston Pride
May 2, 2016	Lisa Chesson	Buffalo Beauts
May 2, 2016	Kaliya Johnson	Connecticut Whale
May 3, 2016	Cydney Roesler	Connecticut Whale
May 3, 2016	Nicole Connery	Connecticut Whale
May 3, 2016	Nicole Kosta	Connecticut Whale
May 4, 2016	Kelley Steadman	Buffalo Beauts
May 4, 2016	Shelby Bram	Buffalo Beauts
May 5, 2016	Courtney Burke	New York Riveters
May 10, 2016	Harrison Browne	Buffalo Beauts
May 10, 2016	Devon Skeats	Buffalo Beauts
May 11, 2016	Jessica Koizumi	Connecticut Whale
May 13, 2016	Shenae Lundberg	Connecticut Whale
May 16, 2016	Kourtney Kunichika	Buffalo Beauts
May 16, 2016	Emily Janiga	Buffalo Beauts

=== Trades ===
April 26, 2016	To New York Riveters Haley Skarupa (Right)	To Connecticut Whale Michelle Picard (Right)
April 27, 2016	To New York Riveters Hannah Brandt (Right)	To Connecticut Whale Dana Trivigno (Right)
April 28, 2016	To Boston Pride Alex Carpenter (Right)	To New York Riveters Miye D'Oench (Right)

=== Retired ===
Date	Player
May 11, 2016	Jenny Scrivens
