= Penn State women's ice hockey club =

Penn State Lady Ice Lions
- University: Penn State University
- Conference: Central Collegiate Women's Hockey Association
- Governing Body: ACHA Women's Division 1
- First season: 2012–13
- Head coach: Dillon Adamson; 1st season, 0–0–0
- Assistant coaches: Brendan Liebross
- Captain(s): Kellie O'Connor
- Alternate captain(s): Katie Samide, Carlene Stumpo
- Arena: Pegula Ice Arena; University Park, Pennsylvania
- Colors: Blue and white

ACHA tournament appearances
- Division 1: 2015; Division 2: 2013, 2014

Conference tournament champions
- None

Conference regular season champions
- CHE: 2014

Current uniform
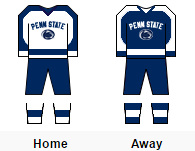

The Penn State Women's Ice Hockey Club (also known as the Penn State Lady Ice Lions) represents Penn State University (PSU) in Women's Division 1 of the American Collegiate Hockey Association (ACHA) and in the Central Collegiate Women's Hockey Association (CCWHA). Since the team's establishment in 2012 (following a predecessor team that existed from 1996 until 2012), it has been very successful, including a pair of ACHA second-place finishes at the Division 2 level in 2012–13 and 2013–14 and an appearance at the ACHA Division 1 national championship tournament to close the 2014–15 season. PSU is one of just three teams to appear in consecutive ACHA Division 2 championship games, joining the University of Minnesota-Duluth (2007–08) and Rainy River Community College (2008–11).

Jeremy Bean became the Lady Ice Lions' second head coach since the team's founding in 2017–18, as he took over for 2013–14 ACHA Division 2 Coach of the Year winner Patrick Fung.

== History ==
=== The Lady Icers (1996–2012) ===
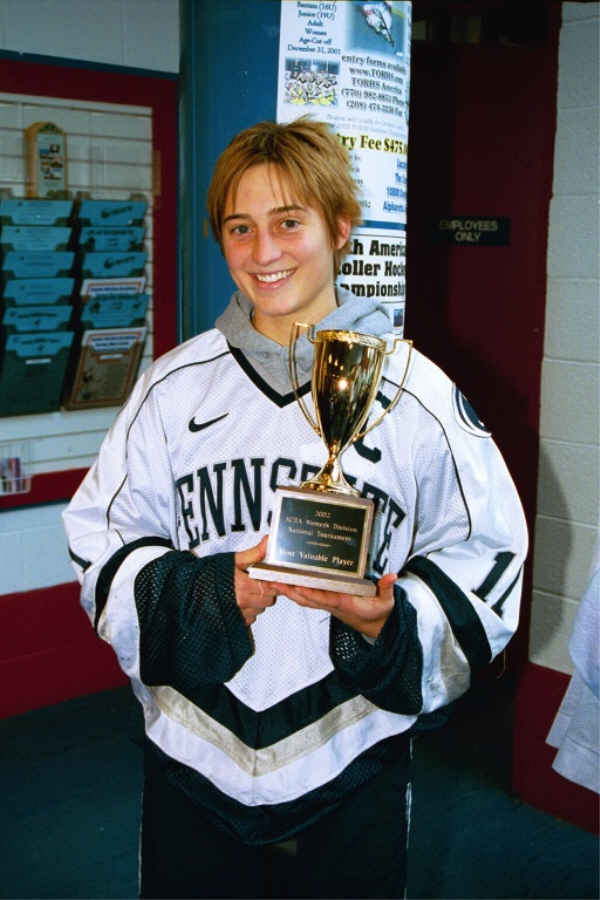
Andrea Lavelle with her trophy for winning most valuable player at the 2002 ACHA National Tournament

Penn State's first women's hockey team – called the "Lady Icers" – began play in the 1996–97 season, after students Ellen Bradley and Kathy Beckford recruited players from around campus and Vinnie Scalamogna, the assistant manager of the Penn State Ice Pavilion (then the university's sole ice facility), as coach. The Lady Icers' first game, a 5–4 win over the Susquehanna Rockettes (an adult club team), took place on February 1, 1997.

The Lady Icers' most successful period began in 1999–2000 when it joined a conference known as the Mid-Atlantic Women's Collegiate Hockey Association along with many of the university's traditional rivals from other sports like the University of Pittsburgh, the University of Maryland, and Syracuse University, and ran up a perfect 8–0–0 league mark in the regular season, then defeated Pittsburgh 2–0 in the MAWCHA playoff championship game. Penn State would go on to repeat as MAWCHA regular season champions in 2000–01 and take the Delaware Valley Collegiate Hockey Conference regular season and playoff titles in 2002–03.

In 2000, the ACHA initiated its first women's division, with the Lady Icers as one of its inaugural members (the team would play in what was the ACHA's sole women's division through the 2005–06 season, and subsequently in Division 1 after the ACHA formed a second women's division). PSU participated in each of the ACHA's first four women's national championship tournaments (and six overall), peaking with a third-place finish in 2002's edition led by coach Billie Willits. The stars of that 2001–02 team included ACHA player of the year and tournament most valuable player Andrea Lavelle, as well as Katie King, who finished her career in 2005 as the top scorer in Lady Icers history.

The team helped launch the ECWHL in 2003 and would remain in the conference through the rest of its years in the ACHA. However, PSU struggled competitively through the middle part of the 2000s, thanks to issues with recruitment and retention, coaching continuity and cash flow – including a low point when the Lady Icers had to cancel a trip to the 2007 ECWHL playoffs for financial reasons. Mo Stroemel began his four years as head coach in the 2007–08 season, and is credited with stabilizing the club. Under Stroemel's watch, the Lady Icers made a final ACHA National Tournament appearance in 2010.

After years of speculation the program transitioned to the NCAA Division I level along with the PSU men's ice hockey team for the 2012–13 season. The move was made possible thanks to a Penn State-record $88 million (later increased to $102 million) donation from Terry Pegula (a Penn State alumnus and billionaire hockey fan) and his wife Kim. The gift, announced on September 17, 2010, primarily was used to finance the construction of a new ice arena and endow scholarships.

Penn State temporarily concluded its time in ACHA Division 1 in February 2012, with eventual NCAA team head coach Josh Brandwene behind the bench. That season, the Lady Icers played a mixed schedule, featuring ACHA and ECWHL opponents as well as eleven games against NCAA Division I and Division III teams – highlighted by Tess Weaver's overtime goal in an upset of NCAA Division I Sacred Heart on January 14, 2012. The team finished the year by claiming the ECWHL regular season title, but then losing to Rhode Island in the ECWHL playoff championship game.

=== A new era begins (2012–2014) ===
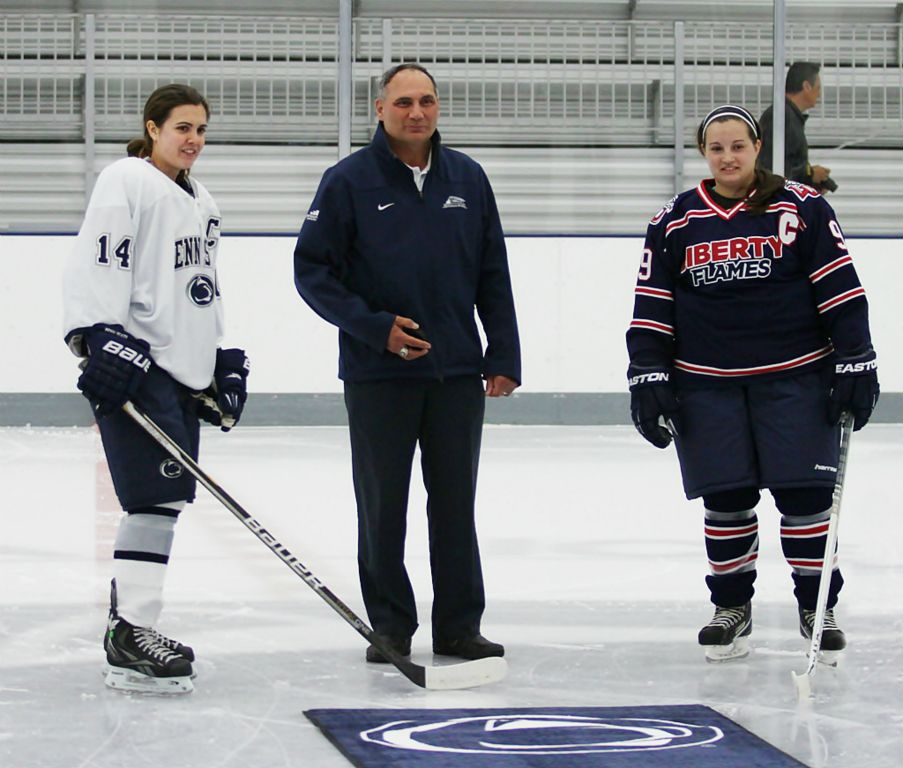
Lady Ice Lions captain Carly Szyszko and Liberty captain Rena Leone take a ceremonial faceoff from Penn State Assistant Athletic Director Joe Battista at the first intercollegiate hockey game in Pegula Ice Arena on September 27, 2013

When the Lady Icers evolved to NCAA status following the 2011–12 season, several former members of that team who were not a part of the NCAA roster formed a new ACHA team at the Division 2 level during the summer of 2012. Mary Kate Tonetti led the push – an effort that would later help her win the ACHA's Off-Ice MVP Award for the 2012–13 season – along with 2011–12 Lady Icers teammates Carly Szyszko, Allie Rothman, Katie Vaughan, Ashton Schaffer and Sarah Eisenhut. Former Lady Icers assistant Patrick Fung was eventually brought on as head coach, while freshmen like Devon Fisk, Mandy Mortach, Jackie Saideh, Nina Elia and Tara Soukup helped fill out a small roster that included just 13 players when the re-christened team played its first-ever game, a 2–1 overtime loss to California (PA) at BladeRunners Ice Complex in Bethel Park, PA.

Penn State's home rink in 2012–13, purportedly, was the same Penn State Ice Pavilion used by the Lady Icers. However, while the team did practice there (using a makeshift locker room with large sheets for walls), their status as a late-arriving first-year team, coupled with scheduling congestion at the soon-to-be-decommissioned single-sheet facility then hosting four intercollegiate hockey teams and other events, meant that they did not play a single on-campus home game. PSU did manage one off-campus home contest, a blowout of Slippery Rock on December 9, 2012, at Galactic Ice in nearby Altoona, PA. The twin themes of a thin schedule entirely on the road and a light roster would dominate most of the regular season, although key wins over Michigan State and particularly over West Chester (then the second-ranked team in the East Region, one of two in ACHA Division 2) helped Penn State sneak into the ACHA National Tournament as the number four team in the East Region, the final available bid.

Few anticipated what came next at the tournament, held at the Ashburn Ice House in Ashburn, VA from March 7–10, 2013: wins over West No. 1 Alaska (2–1) and defending Division 2 national champion Wisconsin-Stout (3–1) on the first two days of the championships. With the top seed in the semifinals already secure after just the pair of games, the Lady Ice Lions tied with North Dakota State (3–3) to close the pool round of the tournament. In the semis, PSU once again ran into UW-Stout, a game that stands as one of the signature contests in team history. With the Blue Devils leading 1–0 midway through the third period, a Soukup shot on the power play from the top of the left circle flew through Fisk and past Stout goalie Kaye Collier. Following the remainder of regulation, a five-minute first overtime and nearly four minutes of a second one, Elia pushed home a third-chance transition goal after tries by Fisk and Elizabeth Denis to send the team to the national championship game. The run ended one win short however, as West Chester overturned an early 2–0 Penn State lead and took the title with a 5–2 victory.

The 2013–14 season was marked by both continuity and change. Nearly all of the senior-free 2012–13 squad returned (with second-leading scorer Mortach a notable exception), this time with a little bit of depth, thanks to a strong freshman class including future captains Lucy Yeatman, Anna Marcus and Cassie Dunne. Newness came in form of the Penn State's joining a conference for the first time, College Hockey East (CHE), a league that included Cal, West Chester and Delaware and guaranteed a robust schedule. PSU's other major issue during 2012–13 was cured with the opening of $90 million Pegula Ice Arena, a twin-sheet facility that allowed the team a permanent locker room and largely cured scheduling headaches. The Lady Ice Lions played the first intercollegiate hockey game in the arena's history, topping Liberty on September 27, 2013.

Other than, notably, an intense rivalry with Cal that saw the teams split six overall meetings in 2013–14, high expectations and the remainder of the schedule proved no burden as Penn State ran up a 14–2–2 regular season record, 6–2–2 of which came within the CHE to take the league's regular-season title. Although the Vulcans defeated the Lady Ice Lions in the CHE's playoff championship game, a bid to the 2014 ACHA National Tournament at Fred Rust Ice Arena in Newark, DE was expected, with PSU placing in ACHA Division 2's East Region's top two during every 2013–14 ranking period (in stark contrast to the previous season).

At nationals a familiar pattern emerged, as Penn State opened with another tight win over Alaska (3–2), then topped Delaware (3–0) to once again wrap up a trip to the semifinals in short order. This time though, the repeat low-stakes game against NDSU and eventual Zoë M. Harris Player of the Year Kacie Johnson resulted in a dominating 5–2 Penn State win featuring two goals by Marcus. Fisk then added her own brace, with Vaughan making 20 necessary saves, as the Lady Ice Lions held on for a 2–1 victory over frequent nemesis Cal to head back to the ACHA Division 2 championship game. However, PSU once again came up short in the final, this time to Iowa State and tournament MVP Millie Luedtke, who scored the game's only goal on the power play with 7:21 remaining in the third period.

=== Elevation to ACHA Division 1 (2014–2017) ===
Following the quick success of consecutive second-place finishes in ACHA Division 2, Penn State elected to move back to ACHA Division 1 for the 2014–15 season. As part of the jump, the team initiated membership in the ECWHL, significant as the league occupied by the previous Lady Icers team from 2003 to 2012.

Coinciding with the division change, the Lady Ice Lions received a significant boost in the effort to succeed in Division 1 in the form of four players cut from PSU's NCAA Division I team during the 2014 offseason: forwards Darby Kern, Cara Mendelson and Katie Murphy, along with defenseman Madison Smiddy. Mendelson, Murphy and Smiddy had spent their freshman years in 2011–12 as Lady Icers before joining the NCAA team for two seasons, while Kern was a year younger with no prior ACHA experience. A fifth NCAA cut, Jessica Desorcie, also joined the Women's Ice Hockey Club as an assistant coach. Numerous key players from the Division 2 seasons also remained, including Fisk, Schaffer, Saideh, Elia and Tonetti, while the regular incoming class was highlighted by Kelly Watson, Riley O'Connor, Claire Gauthier and Tarika Embar. Tonetti, despite being a senior, was also an addition in a sense, as she was finally able to move back to her natural goaltending position after two years playing forward in order to balance out the occasionally-wobbly roster count.

Even with the team's rapid growth, an uneven start to the season followed, as an opening sweep at Vermont was tailed by a somewhat uninspiring pair of wins against Delaware (now in a lower division, of course) and a goal-less weekend at Massachusetts. Slowly but surely though, big wins started rolling in. The first major blow was a 3–2 win over Rhode Island on November 9, 2014, and a 2–1 overtime result against UMass followed on January 10, 2015. The Rams were fourth in the ACHA rankings at the time of the meeting, while the Minutewomen were fifth.

The biggest though, by far, was a 4–3 victory over top-ranked Miami on January 18, 2015. Smiddy scored twice in the victory, including the opening goal and the game winner with 3:16 left. Saideh and O'Connor also scored goals that stalled the hosts' momentum at crucial points, while Tonetti offered 33 saves in one of the best performances of her career. Prior to the PSU win, the RedHawks had a 31-game unbeaten streak dating back 359 days, as well as a 25-game unbeaten streak at Goggin Ice Center. Additionally, MU had been the number one team in every ACHA Division 1 ranking issued since the beginning of the 2013–14 season (a streak that would last until that October) and had won the 2014 ACHA Division 1 title to initiate a run of three straight ACHA championship games (winning again in 2016).

Thanks largely to the Miami win – and despite a loss to URI in the ECWHL playoff semifinals that nearly undid everything – Penn State qualified for the 2015 ACHA National Tournament at York City Ice Arena in York, PA. However, the team saw a quicker exit than had been customary to that point, losing in overtime to eventual champion Liberty, followed by ties with UMass and Grand Valley State to drop out of the running after the pool round. On an individual level, Kern collected 61 points (on 34 goals and 27 assists) to lead the nation in scoring while being named as a finalist for the Zoë M. Harris Award and taking PSU's first First Team All-American award at the Division 1 level.

Although Kern returned for a senior year in 2015–16 and once again posted stellar numbers (46 points, again among the national leaders), the Lady Ice Lions found their roster turnover too heavy to overcome and took the first step backward in team history, stumbling to a 5–20–2 overall record and finishing unranked. Critical personnel holes included the graduations of Tonetti, Smiddy, Murphy, Mendelson, captain Kim Badorrek and Taylor Nyman (followed by the graduations of Fisk and Schaffer in December 2015, midway through the season) as the team struggled on both ends of the ice – allowing 5.15 goals per game over the course of the year, while enduring a goal drought spanning three full games and parts of two others from November 13, 2015, through January 9, 2016. One highlight came on January 9, 2016, in the form of an overtime victory over eventual ECWHL playoff champion UMass.

== Season-by-season results ==
Won Championship	Lost Championship	Regular Season Conference Champions

=== Women's Ice Hockey Club ===
Year	Coach	W	L	T	Conference	Conf. W	Conf. L	Conf. T	Finish	Conference Tournament	ACHA Tournament
2016–17	Patrick Fung	7	19	1	ECWHL	5	9	0	3rd	Lost Semifinals vs. Rhode Island (1–5); Won Third Place vs. Northeastern (7–1)	Did not qualify
2015–16	Patrick Fung	5	20	2	ECWHL	4	8	2	4th	Won First Round vs. Northeastern (4–0); Lost Semifinals vs. Rhode Island (0–7); Lost Third Place vs. Vermont (2–7)	Did not qualify
2014–15	Patrick Fung	17	8	2	ECWHL	10	4	0	3rd	Won First Round vs. Navy (8–0); Lost Semifinals vs. Rhode Island (1–4); Won Third Place vs. Vermont (4–1)	Lost Pool Round vs. Liberty (3–4 OT); Tied Pool Round vs. Massachusetts (3–3 OT); Tied Pool Round vs. Grand Valley State (3–3 OT)
2013–14	Patrick Fung	19	4	2	CHE	8	2	2	1st	Won Semifinals vs. Delaware (2–1); Lost Championship vs. California (PA) (1–2)	Won Pool Round vs. Alaska (3–2); Won Pool Round vs. Delaware (3–0); Won Pool Round vs. North Dakota State (5–2); Won Semifinals vs. California (PA) (2–1); Lost Championship vs. Iowa State (0–1)
2012–13	Patrick Fung	9	4	1	Independent	–	–	–	–	None	Won Pool Round vs. Alaska (2–1); Won Pool Round vs. Wisconsin-Stout (3–1); Tied Pool Round vs. North Dakota State (3–3 OT); Won Semifinals vs. Wisconsin-Stout (2–1 2OT); Lost Championship vs. West Chester (2–5)

=== Lady Icers ===
Year	Coach	W	L	T	Conference	Conf. W	Conf. L	Conf. T	Finish	Conference Tournament	ACHA Tournament
2011–12	Josh Brandwene	13	15	3	ECWHL	7	2	1	1st	Won Semifinals vs. Massachusetts (3–2); Lost Championship vs. Rhode Island (1–4)	Did not qualify
2010–11	Mo Stroemel	11	14	2	ECWHL	4	3	1	3rd	Lost Semifinals vs. Rhode Island (2–7); Lost Third Place vs. Massachusetts (0–2)	Did not qualify
2009–10	Mo Stroemel	12	13	1	ECWHL	3	3	0	3rd	Did not participate^{†}	Lost Pool Round vs. Robert Morris (IL) (0–3); Lost Pool Round vs. Rhode Island (0–5); Won Pool Round vs. Liberty (1–0)
2008–09	Mo Stroemel	7	19	0	ECWHL	4	4	0	3rd	Lost Semifinals vs. Rhode Island (1–4); Won Third Place vs. Connecticut (4–0)	Did not qualify
2007–08	Mo Stroemel	8	17	0	ECWHL	3	5	0	3rd	Lost Semifinals vs. Massachusetts (4–9); Won Third Place vs. Connecticut (4–3)	Did not qualify
2006–07	Michael Brinton	20	14	0	ECWHL	6	8	0	4th	Did not participate^{‡}	Lost Pool Round vs. Lindenwood (1–16); Lost Pool Round vs. Connecticut (2–9); Lost Consolation vs. Minnesota (1–7)
2005–06	Michael Brinton	10	11	0	ECWHL	4	8	0	–	Did not qualify	Did not qualify
2004–05	Chris Whittemore, Erica Petrosky	5	14	4	ECWHL	2	3	3	4th	Lost Semifinals vs. Rhode Island (1–6); Lost Third Place vs. Bates (3–4 2OT)	Did not qualify
2003–04	Chris Whittemore	16	13	2	ECWHL	4	4	0	3rd	Lost Semifinals vs. Massachusetts (8–9 2OT); Won Third Place vs. Boston University (4–1)	Lost Pool Round vs. Michigan State (0–6); Won Pool Round vs. Western Michigan (3–0); Tied Consolation vs. Robert Morris (IL) (3–3)
2002–03	Jeremy Sharpe	19	12	3	DVCHC	8	0	0	1st	Won Semifinals vs. American (15–0); Won Championship vs. Pennsylvania (5–3)	Lost Pool Round vs. Michigan State (1–5); Lost Pool Round vs. Western Michigan (0–3); Lost Pool Round vs. West LA College (0–5); Lost Seventh Place vs. St. Cloud State (2–4)
2001–02	Billie Willits	22	7	1	Independent	–	–	–	–	None	Won Pool Round vs. Bates (3–1); Won Pool Round vs. Michigan State (5–0); Lost Pool Round vs. Wisconsin (1–3); Won Third Place vs. Boston University (4–2)
2000–01	Billie Willits	17	10	1	MAWCHA	6	2	0	1st	Won Semifinals vs. Buffalo (3–2); Lost Championship vs. Maryland (3–4 OT)	Lost Pool Round vs. Arizona State (1–3); Won Pool Round vs. Maryland (3–1); Lost Pool Round vs. Wisconsin (2–5); Lost Seventh Place vs. Pittsburgh (0–1)
1999–00	Pam Glanert	14	5	1	MAWCHA	8	0	0	1st	Won Semifinals vs. Syracuse (4–2); Won Championship vs. Pittsburgh (2–0)	Tournament did not exist
1998–99	Jessica Ferrer	10	4	1	Independent	–	–	–	–	None	Tournament did not exist
1997–98	Vinnie Scalamogna, Jessica Ferrer	5	10	2	Independent	–	–	–	–	None	Tournament did not exist
1996–97	Vinnie Scalamogna	4	2	1	Independent	–	–	–	–	None	Tournament did not exist

^{†} Although Penn State qualified for the 2010 ECWHL playoffs and was slated to play Massachusetts in the semifinals, the team was unable to travel to hosting Rhode Island due to weather concerns, resulting in UMass' automatic advancement to the championship game.

^{‡} In the 2007 ECWHL playoffs, Penn State was originally scheduled to play Rhode Island in the semifinal round. However, PSU was unable to travel to the playoffs due to budgetary reasons, resulting in URI's automatic advancement to the championship game.

== Program records ==
As of February 28, 2017.

=== Women's Ice Hockey Club ===
==== Career scoring leaders ====
Name	Years	Games	Goals	Assists	Points
Darby Kern	2014–16	52	59	48	107
Devon Fisk	2012–16	76	49	35	84
Riley O'Connor	2014–present	78	22	24	46
Carly Szyszko^	2010–14	91	22	21	43
Cara Mendelson^	2011–12, 14–15	53	16	21	37
Claire Gauthier	2014–17	60	12	23	35
Geneva Wagoner	2013–15	37	11	20	31
Allie Rothman^	2010–14	92	8	22	30
Katie Murphy^	2011–12, 14–15	53	14	15	29
Jackie Saideh	2012–16	88	19	10	29
Cassie Dunne	2013–17	96	13	16	29
Anna Marcus	2013–17	89	8	18	26
Elizabeth Denis^	2011–14	28	18	7	25
Tara Soukup	2012–15	39	8	16	24
Meghan Miller	2015–present	51	8	16	24
Kelly Watson	2014–17	73	9	14	23
Liz Tuorinsky	2015–17	50	7	14	21
Ashton Schaffer	2011–16	89	4	17	21
Madison Smiddy^	2011–12, 14–15	50	10	10	20

^ Lady Ice Lions players who spent part of their careers with the Lady Icers program in 2010–11 and 2011–12 have statistics from the previous team included.

==== Single season scoring leaders ====
Name	Year	Games	Goals	Assists	Points
Darby Kern	2014–15	25	34	27	61
Darby Kern	2015–16	27	25	21	46
Cara Mendelson	2014–15	27	15	18	33
Devon Fisk	2013–14	24	20	10	30
Devon Fisk	2014–15	27	12	14	26
Geneva Wagoner	2013–14	25	11	15	26
Riley O'Connor	2015–16	27	10	15	25
Katie Murphy	2014–15	27	13	11	24
Devon Fisk	2012–13	14	15	6	21
Claire Gauthier	2014–15	27	9	11	20
Mandy Mortach	2012–13	14	11	6	17
Carly Szyszko	2013–14	25	11	6	17
Riley O'Connor	2014–15	27	9	8	17

==== Notable goaltenders ====
Name	Years	Minutes	Saves	Save Pct.	GAA	Shutouts
Katie Vaughan^	2010–14	3721:47	1742	0,935	1.81	8
Mary Kate Tonetti^	2011–15	1688:25	802	0,938	1.86	7
Meg Lydick	2016–17	1448:37	842	0,894	4.18	1
Allyssa Long	2014–17	790:00	324	0,848	5.01	2
Aimee Little	2014–16	513:39	291	0,898	3.85	0
Sumire Clevenger	2014–17	296:14	123	0,799	7.49	0
Sarah Eisenhut^	2011–14	253:46	68	0,907	1.41	1
Hanna Scanlon	2015–16	245:00	111	0,917	2.45	2

^ Lady Ice Lions players who spent part of their careers with the Lady Icers program in 2010–11 and 2011–12 have statistics from the previous team included.

=== Lady Icers ===
==== Scoring leaders by season ====
Year	Goals	Assists	Points	Penalty Minutes
2001–02	Andrea Lavelle (76)	Katie King (45)	Andrea Lavelle (114)	Alex McVicker (59)
2002–03	Katie King (41)	Katie King (39)	Katie King (80)	Alex McVicker (48); Becky Holmes (48)
2003–04	Katie King (48)	Katie King (32)	Katie King (80)	Alex McVicker (54)
2004–05	Katie King (15)	Katie King (10)	Katie King (25)	Alex McVicker (55)
2005–06	Jessica Waldron (31)	Ashleigh Kinder (18)	Jessica Waldron (44)	Jessica Waldron (108)
2006–07	Alicia Lepore (81)	Jessica Waldron (43)	Alicia Lepore (121)	Jessica Waldron (103)
2007–08	Jessica Waldron (25)	Jessica Waldron (18)	Jessica Waldron (43)	Jessica Waldron (120)
2008–09	Michelle Clarke (8)	Jessica Waldron (9)	Jessica Waldron (14)	Jessica Waldron (46)
2009–10	Alicia Lepore (20)	Katharine Gausseres (13)	Alicia Lepore (27)	Dana Heller (22)
2010–11	Kirsten Evans (10)	Carly Szyszko (11)	Carly Szyszko (16)	Lindsay Reihl (37)
2011–12	Jessica Desorcie (19)	Tess Weaver (21)	Tess Weaver (35)	Lindsay Reihl (32)

==== Goaltending leaders by season ====
(Minimum 60 minutes played)

Year	Wins	Goals Against Average	Save Percentage	Shutouts
2002–03	Tara Wheeler (15)	Jen McDevitt (1.61)	Jen McDevitt (0.887)	Tara Wheeler (5)
2003–04	Tara Wheeler (13)	Tara Wheeler (1.70)	Tara Wheeler (0.905)	Tara Wheeler (7)
2004–05	Gena Goldbaum (2); Melanie Kleinmann (2)	Melanie Kleinmann (2.93)	Melanie Kleinmann (0.906)	Gena Goldbaum (1)
2005–06	Gena Goldbaum (6)	Gena Goldbaum (3.23)	Gena Goldbaum (0.889)	Gena Goldbaum (1)
2006–07	Melanie Kleinmann (12)	Melanie Kleinmann (3.92)	Melanie Kleinmann (0.895)	Melanie Kleinmann (6)
2007–08	Brittany Frohnhoefer (3)	Brittany Frohnhoefer (6.11)	Gena Goldbaum (0.870)	Brittany Frohnhoefer (1)
2008–09	Brittany Frohnhoefer (6)	Brittany Frohnhoefer (4.81)	Brittany Frohnhoefer (0.830)	Brittany Frohnhoefer (3)
2009–10	Heather Rossi (10)	Heather Rossi (2.69)	Heather Rossi (0.911)	Heather Rossi (4)
2010–11	Heather Rossi (5)	Katie Vaughan (2.03)	Katie Vaughan (0.943)	Katie Vaughan (2)
2011–12	Katie Vaughan (12)	Katie Vaughan (2.33)	Katie Vaughan (0.928)	Katie Vaughan (2)

== ACHA ranking history ==
=== Women's Ice Hockey Club ===
==== ACHA Division 1 ====
ACHA Division 1 rankings were issued five times per year in both 2014–15 and 2015–16, with the top eight in the fourth in-season ranking (fifth overall), released in February, receiving a bid to the ACHA National Tournament. Beginning with the 2016–17 season, the ACHA tabulated rankings each week during the season and issued them on Tuesdays following weekends including games.

Year	Ranking																	
Year	Pre	1	2	3	4	5	6	7	8	9	10	11	12	13	14	15	16	17
2014–15	11	12	11	8	7													
2015–16	7	15	15	15	RV													
2016–17	RV	RV	RV	RV	RV	–	–	RV	RV	RV	RV	–	–	RV	RV	RV	15	15
2017–18	15	RV	–	–	–	–	–	–	–	–	–	–	–	–	–	–	–	

==== ACHA Division 2 ====
During both of Penn State's seasons in Division 2, every division team was assigned to either the East Region (as PSU was) or the West Region. Rankings were issued quarterly during the season. The fourth and final ranking, released in February, determined bids to and seeding for the ACHA National Tournament, with the top four teams in each region receiving invitations.

Year	Ranking			
Year	1	2	3	4
2012–13	4E	3E	3E	4E
2013–14	1E	1E	1E	2E

=== Lady Icers ===
==== National rankings ====
The ACHA began compiling a national ranking in 2003–04, issued four times per season, with the top twelve (from 2003–04 through 2008–09) or eight (from 2009–10 through 2011–12) in the fourth ranking, released in February, receiving a bid to the ACHA National Tournament.

Year	Ranking			
Year	1	2	3	4
2003–04	12	12	12	12
2004–05	7	10	12	15
2005–06	11	12	14	15
2006–07	7	7	10	11
2007–08	13	15	–	15
2008–09	12	13	13	14
2009–10	7	8	8	7
2010–11	7	7	7	9
2011–12	10	12	11	9

==== Regional rankings ====
From 2000–01 through 2002–03, regional rankings were the sole method for determining ACHA National Tournament bids. The inaugural 2000–01 season featured teams divided into East and West Regions, with the top four from each in February's final ranking invited to nationals. For 2001–02 and 2002–03, the setup was expanded to include East, Central and West Regions. Under that system, the top two from each region were invited to nationals, along with two wild card teams. In 2003–04, the tournament field was expanded to 12 teams, and a national ranking was introduced. The latter development diminished the importance of the regional rankings, as the national rankings were used to determine nationals bids. Regional champions were still awarded an autobid, however, even if ranked outside of the top 12 nationally. In 2004–05, growth in the number of ACHA women's teams resulted in an increase to four regions – Northeast, Southeast, Central and West – although things reverted to East, Central and West in 2007–08. The 2009–10 season was notable both for the fact that the tournament field was reduced back to eight teams and as the final year of the regional system, which had become largely antiquated as regional champions generally had little issue placing highly in the national rankings.

The Lady Icers were placed in the East or Southeast Region for the duration of the regional ranking's existence.

Year	Ranking				
Year	1	2	3	4	5
2000–01	2E	2E	2E	2E	1E
2001–02	2E	2E	2E	2E	2E
2002–03	1E	1E	1E	1E	
2003–04	3E	3E	3E	3E	
2004–05	1SE	1SE	1SE	2SE	
2005–06	2SE	2SE	2SE	2SE	
2006–07	1SE	1SE	1SE	1SE	
2007–08	5E	6E	6E	5E	
2008–09	4E	4E	4E	4E	
2009–10	3E	4E	4E		

== ACHA national honors ==
=== Women's Ice Hockey Club ===
==== Annual Awards ====
Awards earned during the 2012–13 and 2013–14 seasons were in ACHA Division 2, all others were in ACHA Division 1

Coach of the Year

- Patrick Fung – 2013–14

Off-Ice Most Valuable Player

- Mary Kate Tonetti – 2012–13

ACHA Community Playmaker

- Kelly Watson – 2016–17

Academic All-American

- Cassie Dunne – 2016–17
- Tarika Embar – 2016–17, 2017–18
- Riley O'Connor – 2016–17, 2017–18
- Kelly Watson – 2016–17
- Lucy Yeatman – 2016–17
- Rachel Cole – 2017–18
- Claire Gauthier – 2017–18
- Meghan Miller – 2017–18
- Sophie Paolizzi – 2017–18

First Team All-American

- Katie Vaughan – 2013–14
- Geneva Wagoner – 2013–14
- Darby Kern – 2014–15

Second Team All-American

- Devon Fisk – 2013–14
- Darby Kern – 2015–16

All-American Honorable Mention

- Devon Fisk – 2012–13
- Mandy Mortach – 2012–13
- Katie Vaughan – 2012–13

First Team All-Tournament

- Devon Fisk – 2012–13, 2013–14
- Tara Soukup – 2013–14
- Katie Vaughan – 2013–14

Second Team All-Tournament

- Katie Vaughan – 2012–13
- Cara Mendelson – 2014–15

==== Monthly awards ====
During the 2013–14, 2014–15 and 2015–16 seasons, the ACHA presented a series of monthly awards for both men's and women's divisions.

Harrow Player of the Month

- Darby Kern – January 2015

Warrior Goaltender of the Month

- Mary Kate Tonetti – September 2014, January 2015

Sher-Wood Freshman Spotlight

- Riley O'Connor – November 2014
- Caitlin Costello – October 2015

Great Skate Sportsmanship Award

- Ashton Schaffer – November 2014

Gongshow Stars in the Community

- Team Award – January 2015

=== Lady Icers ===
Zoe M. Harris Award

- Andrea Lavelle – 2001–02

ACHA Tournament Most Valuable Player

- Andrea Lavelle – 2001–02

ACHA Community Playmaker

- Sara Chroman – 2010–11

Academic All-American

- Faryn Shapiro – 2001–02
- Kate Connolly – 2004–05
- Stephanie Feyock – 2004–05
- Katie King – 2004–05
- Lauren Johnston – 2004–05
- Alex McVicker – 2004–05
- Dana Voelker – 2005–06, 2006–07
- Michelle Clarke – 2009–10, 2010–11
- Lydia Scott – 2009–10, 2010–11, 2011–12
- Claire Slagis – 2009–10
- Sara Chroman – 2010–11, 2011–12
- Lindsay Reihl – 2011–12

First Team All-American

- Andrea Lavelle – 2001–02
- Alicia Lepore – 2006–07

Second Team All-American

- Katie King – 2001–02, 2002–03
- Dana Voelker – 2006–07
- Heather Rossi – 2009–10

All-American Honorable Mention

- Andrea Lavelle – 2000–01
- Stephanie Feyock – 2001–02
- Chelsea Sacks – 2007–08
- Sara Chroman – 2010–11
- Kirsten Evans – 2010–11
- Carly Szyszko – 2010–11

First Team All-Tournament

- Ellen Zajko – 2000–01

All-Tournament Honorable Mention

- Stephanie Feyock – 2001–02
- Becky Holmes – 2002–03
- Katie King – 2002–03, 2003–04
- Tara Wheeler – 2003–04
- Alicia Lepore – 2006–07
- Jessica Waldron – 2006–07

== Conference honors ==
=== Women's Ice Hockey Club ===
First Team All-ECWHL

- Darby Kern – 2014–15
- Cassie Dunne – 2016–17

Second Team All-ECWHL

- Mary Kate Tonetti – 2014–15
- Devon Fisk – 2014–15
- Madison Smiddy – 2014–15
- Darby Kern – 2015–16
- Kelly Watson – 2015–16

All-ECWHL Honorable Mention

- Cara Mendelson – 2014–15
- Katie Murphy – 2014–15
- Riley O'Connor – 2015–16, 2016–17
- Meg Lydick – 2016–17
- Meghan Miller – 2016–17
- Kelly Watson – 2016–17

=== Lady Icers ===
First Team All-MAWCHA

- Ellen Zajko – 2000–01
- Sarah Carey – 2000–01

Second Team All-MAWCHA

- Lauren Shaw – 2000–01
- Andrea Lavelle – 2000–01
- Erica Petrosky – 2000–01

== World University Games selections ==
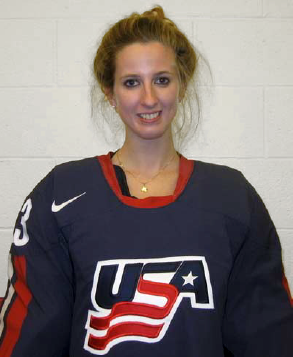
Goaltender Katie Vaughan at World University Games

Since 2011, the ACHA has supplied players for the U.S. National University Select Women's Team, which competes at the World University Games women's hockey tournament, held biennially and as part of the multi-sport event for college and university student-athletes. Penn State has one of the ACHA's strongest track records for selection and, as of 2017, is one of just two schools to send at least one player to each of the four WUG women's tournaments entered by the United States and boasts nine total selections when including players and coaches. Four Lady Icers players and head coach Mo Stroemel were part of the 2011 squad that finished fourth in Erzurum, Turkey during USA Hockey's first trip to WUG. Goaltender Katie Vaughan was among those picked in 2011, and when she earned a repeat spot at the 2013 World University Games in Trentino, Italy, she officially became the first Lady Ice Lions-era player to participate in the event (Stroemel also returned to coach in 2013 but did not hold an official role with the Women's Ice Hockey Club at that time).

Vaughan went on to make history as an integral part of the second American squad in history to win a WUG medal by taking the bronze (a men's Team USA also won bronze in 1972, although they did so by finishing third in a three-team tournament), and the first group of women or men to do so since the ACHA began stocking the teams, an era that began in 2001 on the men's side. In Team USA's opening game in Trentino, on December 10, 2013, Vaughan made 33 saves in a 4–2 win to outduel Russian goalie Anna Prugova, who regularly competed for the senior Russia women's national ice hockey team, including at both the 2010 and 2014 Winter Olympics. Russia's roster also included several other regulars with the nation's lead national team, including Yekaterina Nikolayeva and Anna Shukina. Although Russia bounced back to top Team USA in a shootout in the tournament semifinals, the Americans recovered to defeat Japan 3–1 for the bronze medal – thanks to another stellar effort from the Penn Stater, with 37 saves on 38 Japanese shots.

USA Hockey honored Vaughan as its 2014 Adult Player of the Year thanks to her play at the World University Games.

In 2017, defenseman Cassie Dunne represented Penn State on Team USA in Almaty, Kazakhstan. Dunne, who was selected as a co-captain of the squad, and her teammates managed to repeat the 2013 podium finish by shutting out China 3–0 in the bronze medal match on February 6, 2017. Another key win for Team USA came on January 31, 2017, by a 3–2 count over a Japan team that featured several regulars for the Japan women's national ice hockey team, including Suzuka Taka and Yukiko Kawashima. That victory, in essence, allowed the Americans to advance to the tournament semifinals ahead of Japan.

Madison Smiddy was Penn State's sole selection to Team USA for the 2015 World University Games in Granada, Spain. While Smiddy's iteration of the squad was the only one since 2011 to not make it to the semifinals, finishing fifth, the defenseman did play a key role in her side's biggest highlight by assisting on Emily Ford's overtime goal that capped a come-from-behind win over Kazakhstan. Smiddy finished WUG among the team leaders in defense scoring and plus-minus rating.

Year	Location	Player	Result
2011	Erzurum, Turkey	(United States) Mo Stroemel (head coach)	Fourth place
2011	Erzurum, Turkey	(United States) Lindsay Reihl	Fourth place
2011	Erzurum, Turkey	(United States) Denise Rohlik	Fourth place
2011	Erzurum, Turkey	(United States) Heather Rossi	Fourth place
2011	Erzurum, Turkey	(United States) Katie Vaughan	Fourth place
2013	Trentino, Italy	(United States) Katie Vaughan	Bronze Medal
2015	Granada, Spain	(United States) Madison Smiddy	Fifth place
2017	Almaty, Kazakhstan	(United States) Cassie Dunne	Bronze Medal

=== 2010 ACHA women's select team ===
As a precursor to World University Games participation, the ACHA assembled a women's select team that toured Geneva, Switzerland, Chamonix, France and Méribel, France during April 2010. The team included Lady Icers players Sara Chroman, Heather Rossi and Denise Rohlik. Its final record overseas was 2–2–0, including two close losses to the France women's national ice hockey team and two decisive wins over local club teams.

== Rivalries ==
=== Rhode Island ===
Rather infamously, from a Penn State perspective, the former Lady Icers team struggled mightily with perennial contender Rhode Island while both were ECWHL members from 2003 to 2012, with the Rams owning a 34–2–1 record against PSU during that time. Early in the Women's Ice Hockey Club's first ACHA Division 1 season, the newer team gave some indication of a change in era by earning a 3–2 win on November 9, 2014, at Bradford R. Boss Arena to split the teams' first-ever series. Cara Mendelson, Anna Marcus and Riley O'Connor scored for the Lady Ice Lions, with the latter's game-winning goal helping her subsequently collect ACHA rookie of the month honors. By the end of 2014–15, both PSU and URI found themselves on the bubble to receive one of the eight bids to the ACHA National Tournament given based on the end-of-season D1 rankings. With an automatic bid set to go outside of the top eight to the Western Women's Collegiate Hockey League champion and the Lady Ice Lions and Rams entering an ECWHL semifinal matchup during the weekend before that decisive poll ranked eighth and seventh, respectively, the result of the game was seen as effectively deciding a tournament bid. The victorious team would not only have that final word of course, but also the head-to-head advantage in the three-game season series. However, although Rhode Island won the game 4–1 with Kristy Kennedy scoring twice in the late going, Penn State was still selected for nationals while URI was left out for the first time since 2003.

During the 2015–16 and 2016–17 seasons, a resurgent Rams team topped a struggling PSU in all ten meetings during those years, including second and third consecutive victories in the ECWHL semifinals.

=== Massachusetts ===
UMass has been arguably the ECWHL's top team since Penn State's re-entry through the Women's Ice Hockey Club, with league playoff titles and ACHA tournament bids in 2014–15, 2015–16 and 2016–17. Still, PSU has managed a pair of overtime wins against the Minutewomen in twelve regular season meetings. The first was on the strength of Mendelson's winner on January 10, 2015, with the 2–1 victory against then-fifth-ranked UMass a hefty pillar in the Lady Ice Lions' case for eventual inclusion in the 2015 ACHA National Tournament. Almost exactly one year later, on January 9, 2016, and with the Minutewomen again holding down the five spot in the ACHA rankings, Darian Dempsey provided the knockout punch in a 4–3 contest that saw PSU come back from a 3–1 deficit. Liz Tuorinsky forced the extra period on a blast from the point with 1:46 left in regulation. UMass, however, took the other ends of each of those series at Pegula Ice Arena in narrow decisions and has won each of the six games played at their home William D. Mullins Center.

The Minutewomen are the only ECWHL team Penn State has faced at the ACHA National Tournament in the post-2012 era. In that game, on March 5, 2015, the Lady Ice Lions ran out to a 3–1 lead after two periods but had to settle for a 3–3 tie after UMass' Amanda Abromson scored with 1:04 left in regulation.

=== California (PA) ===
The Women's Ice Hockey Club's first-ever games were a pair of losses at Cal on October 6 and 7, 2012, but the rivalry between the teams didn't fully ramp up until both joined the newly formed women's division of College Hockey East in 2013–14. The Lady Ice Lions and Vulcans spent that entire campaign jockeying for first place in the conference, first place in ACHA Division 2's East Region and, of course, with each other. During the regular season, the teams split a pair of games at Cal's Rostraver Ice Garden in October, then another pair late in the year at Pegula Ice Arena. The final game of those four, a 3–1 Penn State win on February 1, 2014, clinched the CHE regular season championship for the Lady Ice Lions after the Vulcans had put that outcome in doubt with a heated 5–2 win the night before. However, Cal forced a different sort of split – in the CHE titles – with a 2–1 win over PSU in the league playoff final at York City Ice Arena in York, PA behind a goal and an assist from Megan Cooper, which also enabled the western Pennsylvanians to finish with the East Region's top seed heading into the ACHA National Tournament. At nationals though, Penn State would manage the last word by getting a pair of first-period Devon Fisk tallies and hanging on to end the Vulcans' season in the ACHA semifinals.

The Vulcans hold the series advantage with a 5–3–0 record, as the two teams have not played since PSU's move to ACHA Division 1 and out of the CHE following the 2013–14 season.

=== West Chester ===
Late in the Lady Ice Lions' first season, 2012–13, the team managed a road split with West Chester, the squad then ranked second in ACHA Division 2's East Region. In the victory, by a 2–1 count on January 26, 2013, Fisk and Tara Soukup offered goals, while Katie Vaughan made 24 saves. With only three other wins against two other ACHA opponents during an abbreviated regular season and neither of those victims finishing higher than seventh in their region, the WCU win constituted a major reason for Penn State's inclusion in the 2013 ACHA National Tournament as one of the top four in the East Region. The Rams, however, won the season's rubber and most important match by ending PSU's Cinderella tournament run with a 5–2 victory in the national championship game on March 10, 2013, behind three goals from Zoë M. Harris Player of the Year and eventual tournament MVP Becky Dobson.

The following season, West Chester joined CHE along with Penn State and Cal and played four more games against the Lady Ice Lions. The first two of those, at Pegula Ice Arena on November 9 and 10, 2013, saw PSU gain a measure of revenge with decisive 3–0 and 6–3 wins in a powder keg of a series that saw three Elizabeth Denis goals as well as a fight between Soukup and Dobson.

Like the California (PA) series, the West Chester rivalry has been dormant since Penn State's move to ACHA Division 1 with the record presently 4–2–1 in PSU's favor.

=== Buffalo ===
Thanks in part to a weather-related cancellation in 2013 and a shift of Buffalo's team from ACHA Division 1 to Division 2 during the same 2014 offseason that saw the Women's Ice Hockey Club move from Division 2 to Division 1, PSU has not met UB since a Lady Icers sweep at the Ice Pavilion on September 30 and October 1, 2011. However, prior to 2011 when the teams played regularly (including as ECWHL rivals for eight seasons), an intense rivalry existed. On December 1, 2001, Penn State and Buffalo (then known as the "Freeze") engaged in a post-game brawl. The ACHA issued suspensions for four players from each team, each of which were for one game, except for a five-game ban handed to Lady Icers superstar Andrea Lavelle, who "was clearly an instigator in the situation and refused to obey the repeated directions of the referees to vacate the area". Penn State-Buffalo contests in the aftermath of the brawl saw vulgar insults traded between players and fans.

== Players ==
=== Current roster ===
As of November 23, 2017.

No.	Nat.	Player	Class	Pos	Height	DoB	Hometown	Previous team
2		Kate Samide	Senior	F		2000-10-03	Eden Prairie, Minnesota	Eden Prairie High School (MSHSL)
8		Courtney Bove	Junior	F		2002-08-27	Wappingers Falls, New York	Brewster Lady Bulldogs U19 (USAH New York)
9		Elizabeth Baron (A)	Senior	F		2001-07-08	Nashville, Tennessee	Nashville Jr. Predators U19 (USAH Southeastern)
11		Ashley Chiango	Freshman	D		2004-05-29	Andover, Massachusetts	Andover High School (MVC)
12		Deirdre Murphy	Sophomore	D		2002-12-12	Old Tappan, New Jersey	Montclair Blues (USAH Atlantic)
14		Kathryn Pinto	Freshman	F		2004-02-21	Shoreline, Washington	Seattle Jr Lady Admirals U19 (USAH Pacific)
15		Julia Mudryk	Junior	F		2001-11-30	Chesterfield, Virginia	Reston Raiders U19 (USAH Southeastern)
16		Nora Louder	Junior	D		2002-05-25	Holden, Massachusetts	Shrewsbury High School (MVC)
17		Elizabeth Blake	Senior	F		2003-03-24	Morrisdale, Pennsylvania	Pittsburgh Vipers U19 (USAH Mid-American)
20		Emilie Limoges	Senior	F		2000-05-26	Winchester, Virginia	The Hill School (NEPSAC)
20		Emma Shannon	Freshman	G	5' 8" (1.73 m)	1999-05-10	Downingtown, Pennsylvania	Downingtown East High School (USHS–PA)
22		Erin Bonner	Freshman	F	5' 5" (1.65 m)	1999-02-02	West Chester, Pennsylvania	Philadelphia Jr. Flyers U17 (USAH Atlantic)
25		Meghan Miller (A)	Junior	F	5' 4" (1.63 m)	1997-07-19	Barrington, Rhode Island	Rhode Island Sting U19 (USAH New England)
26		Katelyn Trask	Sophomore	F	5' 9" (1.75 m)	1998-03-08	Coventry, Rhode Island	Rhode Island Sting U19 (USAH New England)
41		Tarika Embar (A)	Senior	F	5' 9" (1.75 m)	1995-11-27	Pittsburgh, Pennsylvania	Steel City Selects U19 (USAH Mid-American)
42		Sydney Foy	Freshman	D	5' 5" (1.65 m)	1999-03-03	Imperial, Pennsylvania	Steel City Selects U19 (USAH Mid-American)
45		Sophie Paolizzi	Junior	F	5' 7" (1.7 m)	1997-02-28	West Chester, Pennsylvania	West Chester East High School (USHS-PA)
65		Riley O'Connor (C)	Senior	F	5' 4" (1.63 m)	1996-03-10	Boothwyn, Pennsylvania	Princeton Tiger Lilies U19 (USAH Atlantic)
70		Rachel Cole (A)	Junior	F	5' 7" (1.7 m)	1996-08-07	Wexford, Pennsylvania	Steel City Selects U19 (USAH Mid-American)
78		Madison Dwyer	Junior	F/D	5' 4" (1.63 m)	1997-08-26	Newtown, Pennsylvania	Princeton Tiger Lilies U19 (USAH Atlantic)

=== Notable alumni ===
- Kate Connolly (2001–2005) – International Ice Hockey Federation lineswoman frequently selected for top IIHF events, including the 2015 IIHF Women's World Championship and the 2014 IIHF World Women's U18 Championship
- Paige Harrington (2011–2012) – Player for the Buffalo Beauts and the Boston Pride of the National Women's Hockey League
- Andrea Lavelle (1998–2002) – Player for the Beatrice Aeros of the National Women's Hockey League
- Tara Wheeler (2002–2004) – 2008 Miss Virginia and contestant at Miss America 2009

== Media ==
- PennLive – Through his Stack the Pads blog hosted on the site, Derek Meluzio regularly writes features on Lady Ice Lions players, with a special focus on goaltenders.
- The Daily Collegian – Penn State's student paper runs occasional articles about the team, generally around invitations to the ACHA National Tournament.
- Black Shoe Diaries – The blog, which is devoted to Penn State athletics and is part of the SB Nation network, also publishes occasionally about the team.

== See also ==
- American Collegiate Hockey Association
- Eastern Collegiate Women's Hockey League
- Pegula Ice Arena
- Penn State University
