= Paige Harrington =

American ice hockey player

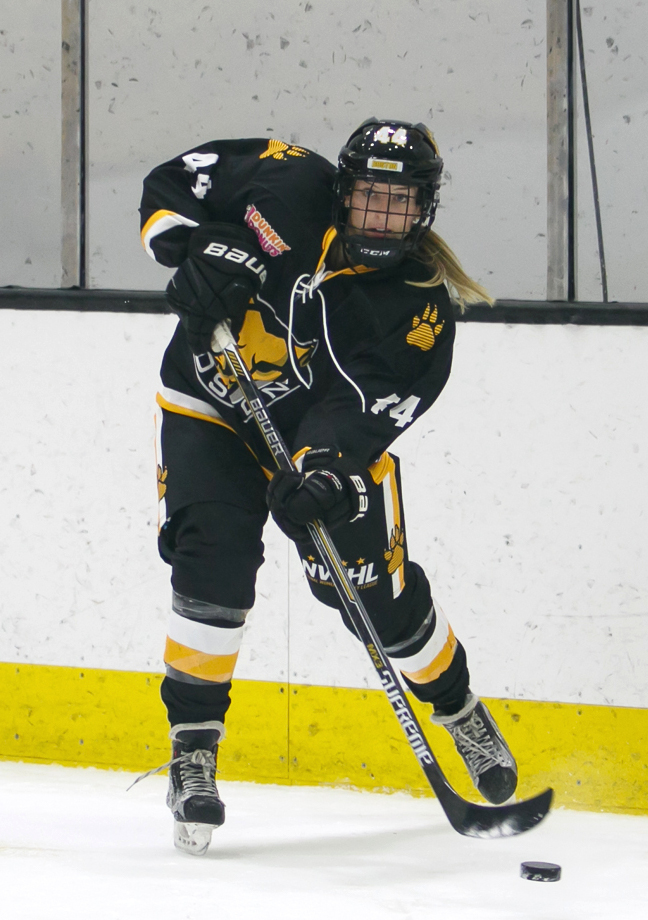
- Paige Harrington playing for the Boston Pride in 2017
- Born: 25 July 1993 (age 33) Mansfield, MA, USA
- Height: 5 ft 11 in (180 cm)
- Weight: 143 lb (65 kg; 10 st 3 lb)
- Position: Defense
- Shoots: Left
- NWHL team Former teams: Boston Pride: Buffalo Beauts (NWHL); UMass Amherst (ACHA); Penn State (ACHA)
- National team: United States
- Playing career: 2011–present
Medal record
Representing United States
Women's ice hockey
Winter Universiade
Bronze medal – third place	2013 Italy	Tournament
Women's ball hockey
World Championship
Silver medal – second place	2017 Czech Republic	Tournament

Paige Harrington (born July 25, 1993) is an American former professional ice hockey player. She last played for the Boston Pride of the National Women's Hockey League (NWHL) in 2017–18, following two seasons with the NWHL's Buffalo Beauts.

== Playing career ==
=== High school ===
Harrington attended Mansfield High School in Mansfield, Massachusetts. She played boys hockey for three years at MHS and girls hockey for one (after the school entered a girls hockey co-op arrangement with Oliver Ames High School) before graduating in 2011.

=== College ===
Following a freshman season at Penn State, Harrington played for the University of Massachusetts Amherst in the American Collegiate Hockey Association (ACHA) for three years. Harrington's time at UMass was characterized by unprecedented success for the Minutemen, as the team won the Eastern Collegiate Women's Hockey League regular season and playoff championships in both 2012–13 and 2014–15 (the first two times UMass had ever won dual league championships, and the first two times the Minutemen won the playoff crown). Additionally, UMass advanced to the ACHA semifinals in both 2012–13 and 2013–14 (the latter ending up as a program-best second-place finish), doubling the number of final four appearances in team history to that point.

In 2012–13, Harrington was sidelined with a broken leg during UMass' late-season playoff push, but still managed to post 16 points in 21 games prior to her injury, while helping the Minutemen to a top-five ranking for the first time in four years. Her teammates went on to defeat defending ACHA national champion Northeastern in the ECWHL championship game and put together an impressive ACHA National Tournament run that ended with a semifinal defeat to eventual champion Minnesota.

Although UMass archrival Rhode Island re-captured both ECWHL titles in 2013–14, the season was still a historic one for the Minutemen. With Harrington now an alternate captain, and with her 17 points leading the way among the squad's blueliners, UMass was ranked in the ACHA's top five for the entirety of the season, winding up in second to equal its best placement ever. At that year's ACHA National Tournament in Newark, Delaware, the Minutemen quickly secured advancement to the semifinals with pool round wins over Liberty and Adrian, followed by Harrington scoring twice in a post-clinch defeat to Robert Morris (IL). The RMU contest was notable as a meeting of future NWHL teammates Harrington and Hayley Williams (who grabbed an assist). In the semifinals, Massachusetts got revenge on URI for the ECWHL playoffs with a 2–1 victory, although Miami University stopped UMass one win shy of a national title with a 3–1 result in the final.

As a senior in 2014–15, Harrington was a co-captain of the team as they took back both ECWHL championships from Rhode Island and once again qualified for the ACHA National Tournament. She enjoyed, arguably, her best season individually as well. Included among her career-best 26 points were a four-point outing against Northeastern on October 24, 2014, as well as the game-winning goal against Penn State two weeks prior to that, her first game against PSU since departing that program in 2012. Harrington was picked as the ACHA's Harrow Defenseman of the Month in November 2014 and was named a First Team All-American at the end of the season.

Harrington graduated from UMass in 2015 with a degree in communications. Despite only spending three seasons in Amherst, her 59 career points rank 15th in program history, as of the end of the 2016–17 season.

=== International ===
==== Winter Universiade ====
Harrington was selected as a member of the United States National University Team which competes at the Winter Universiade twice, in 2013 and 2015, and was selected as an alternate captain each time. The 2013 edition of the tournament, played in Trentino, Italy resulted in a bronze medal for Harrington after a third-place game win over Japan - the first-ever podium finish for an American women's team at the event and the first for the Team USA men or women in USA Hockey's modern era of participation (since 2001). In 2015, Harrington helped Team USA to a fifth-place finish in Granada, Spain.

==== ISBHF World Championship ====
In 2017, Harrington was named to the United States Women's National Ball Hockey Team's roster for the International Street and Ball Hockey Federation's Ball Hockey World Championship tournament. As with the national university team, Harrington helped the U.S. ball hockey program reach new heights by winning the silver medal, following fourth-place finishes each of the previous five times it had entered the biennial tournament. A late semifinal win over a Canada team defending gold medals in 2013 and 2015 and featuring professional women's ice hockey stars Jamie Lee Rattray and Devon Skeats clinched Team USA's best finish ever and highlighted the run.

=== NWHL ===
Ahead of the inaugural NWHL season in 2015–16, Harrington signed a professional contract with the Buffalo Beauts. The signing made her the first former ACHA player to sign in the league (along with Hayley Williams, whose signing was announced at the same time) and just the third documented ACHA alumna to sign in any North American women's professional league. Harrington went on to play in all 18 regular season and all five playoff games during the 2015–16 Buffalo Beauts season, which saw a third-place finish in the standings and an appearance in the first-ever Isobel Cup Final.

In April 2016, Harrington became the first player to re-sign a contract with the Buffalo Beauts for the 2016–17 NWHL season, earning a second $10,000 one-year deal, although league-wide financial difficulties early in the year led to all contracts being halved and eventually supplemented with a revenue-sharing program. Harrington, once again, appeared in every regular season contest as the Beauts repeated their third-place finish with a 6–10–1 mark. However, that season's playoffs, which took place entirely over the March 17–19, 2017 weekend, more than erased that losing mark. Buffalo pulled off a pair of upset victories, over the New York Riveters in the semifinals by a 4–2 count, then 3–2 over the Boston Pride (the defending champions, who had gone 35–4–1 over the two NWHL regular and playoff seasons entering the contest) to capture the Isobel Cup.

On July 12, 2017, Harrington signed with the Pride, the team she faced in the Isobel Cup Final in both 2016 and 2017 as a member of the Beauts, citing the ability to play close to home while transitioning to her off-ice career as reasons for changing teams. She played 14 regular season games for the Pride in 2017–18 and collected three assists. Boston uncharacteristically struggled throughout the season though, managing only a 4–8–4 record and a third-place finish before being eliminated in the league semifinals in overtime by Harrington's former Beauts squad.

== Career statistics ==
=== College and professional ===
			Regular season					Playoffs
Season	Team	League	GP	G	A	Pts	PIM	GP	G	A	Pts	PIM
2011–12	Penn State	ACHA	22	1	2	3	8	—	—	—	—	—
2012–13	UMass Amherst	ACHA	21	5	11	16	24	—	—	—	—	—
2013–14	UMass Amherst	ACHA	25	5	10	15	16	5	2	0	2	4
2014–15	UMass Amherst	ACHA	25	10	15	25	35	3	0	1	1	0
2015–16	Buffalo Beauts	NWHL	18	0	3	3	12	5	0	0	0	2
2016–17	Buffalo Beauts	NWHL	17	0	0	0	14	2	0	0	0	0
2017–18	Boston Pride	NWHL	14	0	3	3	15	1	0	0	0	0
ACHA totals			93	21	38	59	83	8	2	1	3	4
NWHL totals			49	0	6	6	41	8	0	0	0	2

=== International ===
Year	Team	Event	Result	GP	G	A	Pts	PIM
2013	United States	WU	3rd place, bronze medalist(s)	7	0	1	1	2
2015	United States	WU	5th	5	0	3	3	4
2017	United States	BHWC	2nd place, silver medalist(s)	7	0	0	0	8
Totals				19	0	4	4	14

== Awards and honors ==
=== ACHA ===
- Harrow Defenseman of the Month (November 2014)
- 2014–15 First Team All-American

=== NWHL ===
- 2016–17 Isobel Cup champion
