= Emily Pfalzer =

American ice hockey player

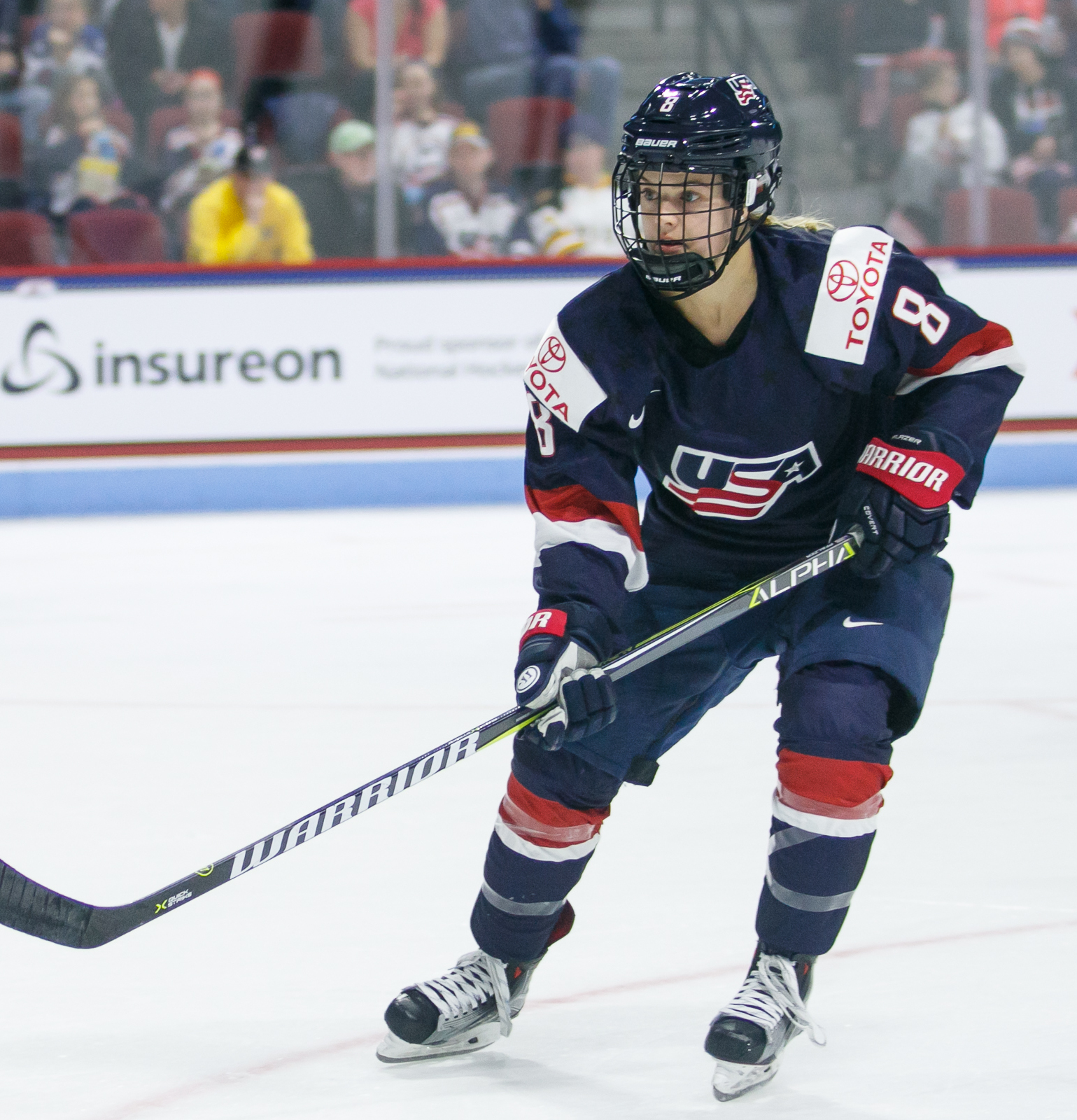
- Emily Pfalzer playing for Team USA in 2017
- Born: June 14, 1993 (age 33) Getzville, New York, U.S.
- Height: 5 ft 2 in (157 cm)
- Weight: 126 lb (57 kg; 9 st 0 lb)
- Position: Defense
- Shot: Right
- Played for: Buffalo Beauts; Mississauga Chiefs; Boston College
- National team: United States
- Playing career: 2015–2021
Medal record
Olympic Games
Gold medal – first place	2018 Pyeongchang	Team
World Championships
Gold medal – first place	2015 Sweden
Gold medal – first place	2016 Canada
Gold medal – first place	2017 United States
Gold medal – first place	2019 Finland
World U18 Championships
Gold medal – first place	2011 Sweden

Emily Pfalzer Matheson (born June 14, 1993) is an American former women's ice hockey player who last played for the Buffalo Beauts of the Premier Hockey Federation (PHF) from 2015–2017 and 2018–2019. She was a part of the initial 125 women's hockey players to found the Professional Women's Hockey Players Association.

Internationally, Pfalzer plays for United States women's national ice hockey team and has won a gold medal at the 2015 IIHF Women's World Championship, 2016 IIHF Women's World Championship, 2017 IIHF Women's World Championship and the 2018 Winter Olympics.

== Playing career ==
=== NCAA ===
Pfalzer played for Boston College for her entire NCAA career, 2011–2015, and was the first defender in the program to reach 100 career points.

=== PHF ===
Pfalzer made her professional debut in the PHF on October 11, 2015, with the Buffalo Beauts playing against the Boston Pride.

During the 2015–16 season, Pfalzer was named the captain of the Buffalo Beauts on November 11, 2015. On November 22, in a match against the Connecticut Whale, Pfalzer would record five assists, setting a Beauts franchise record for most points in one game. In January 2016, Pfalzer captained the 1st NWHL All-Star Game, opposing Team Knight captained by Hilary Knight.

== International play ==
=== USA Hockey ===
Having been part of the United States Hockey National Camp since the age of 14, she served as an assistant captain on the US team that captured the gold medal at the 2011 IIHF Under-18 Women's World Championships.

Following the conclusion of her collegiate career, Pfalzer was named to the United States women's national ice hockey team to compete at the 2015 IIHF Women's World Championship. The following year she was named to the 2016 IIHF Women's World Championship.

Pfalzer was selected to participate at the 2018 Winter Olympics, where she helped Team USA beat Canada for a gold medal.

== Career statistics ==
=== Regular season and playoffs ===
			Regular season					Playoffs
Season	Team	League	GP	G	A	Pts	PIM	GP	G	A	Pts	PIM
2011–12	Boston College	HEA	37	5	13	18	8	–	–	–	–	–
2012–13	Boston College	HEA	37	4	13	17	18	–	–	–	–	–
2013–14	Boston College	HEA	37	6	19	25	14	–	–	–	–	–
2014–15	Boston College	HEA	36	8	34	42	10	–	–	–	–	–
2015–16	Buffalo Beauts	NWHL	17	2	10	12	6	5	1	4	5	2
2016–17	Buffalo Beauts	NWHL	15	1	6	7	6	2	0	0	0	0
2018–19	Buffalo Beauts	NWHL	16	2	4	6	19	2	2	1	3	0
NCAA totals			147	23	79	102	50	–	–	–	–	–
NWHL totals			48	5	20	25	31	9	3	5	8	8

=== International ===
Year	Team	Event	Result	GP	G	A	Pts	PIM
2010	United States	U18	2nd place, silver medalist(s)	5	0	6	6	0
2011	United States	U18	1st place, gold medalist(s)	5	2	2	4	0
2015	United States	WC	1st place, gold medalist(s)	4	1	1	2	0
2016	United States	WC	1st place, gold medalist(s)	5	0	0	0	0
2017	United States	WC	1st place, gold medalist(s)	5	1	1	2	0
2018	United States	OG	1st place, gold medalist(s)	5	0	0	0	0
2019	United States	WC	1st place, gold medalist(s)	7	1	5	6	0
Junior totals				10	2	8	10	0
Senior totals				26	3	7	10	0

== Awards and honors ==
- Hockey East All-Rookie Team, Unanimous Selection (2011–12)
- 2011–12 Boston College Freshman Scholar-Athlete of the Year
- 2012–13 Second Team Hockey East All-Star
- 2013–14 Hockey East Defenseman of the Year
- 2012–13 All New England Division 1 Women's All-Star Team
- 2013–14 First Team Hockey East All-Star
- Top 10 Finalist, 2015 Patty Kazmaier Memorial Award
- 2014–15 Hockey East First Team All-Star
- 2015 CCM Hockey Women's Division I All-Americans, First Team

== Personal life ==
During the summer of 2018, Pfalzer became engaged to Montreal Canadiens defenceman Mike Matheson and married on July 20, 2019. The two met each other while attending Boston College, where Pfalzer played for the women's and Matheson played for the men's team. They have at a son together, announced in 2021. They have a dog named Hank.
