= Amanda Makela =

Canadian ice hockey player

- Born: December 20, 1993 (age 32) Thunder Bay, Ontario, Canada
- Height: 5 ft 7 in (170 cm)
- Position: Goaltender
- Catches: Left
- CWHL team Former teams: Toronto Furies: Buffalo Beauts (NWHL); Mercyhurst Lakers (NCAA); Thunder Bay Queens (OWHA)
- Playing career: 2008–present
Medal record
Women's ice hockey
Representing Canada
IIHF World Women's U18 Championships
Silver medal – second place	2011 Sweden	Tournament
Representing Ontario
Esso Cup
Gold medal – first place	2010 Regina	Tournament

Amanda Makela (born December 20, 1993) is a women's ice hockey player. Having played at the NCAA level with the Mercyhurst Lakers women's ice hockey program, she was a member of the Buffalo Beauts during the 2015-16 NWHL season, the first in league history.

== Playing career ==
With the Thunder Bay Queens (2008–11), Makela captured the 2010 Esso Cup. In the championship game against Saskatchewan's Notre Dame Hounds, she made 30 saves in a 4-3 win. One of her teammates on Thunder Bay was future 2016 CWHL Draft pick Kaitlyn Tougas.

=== Hockey Canada ===
On December 21, 2010, Makela was one of 14 players from Ontario named to Canada's U18 national women's team. Making her debut with the U18 national team in a preliminary match against Switzerland on January 1, 2011, she would make 24 saves (including 11 in the first period) in a 9-1 victory. Of note, future Beauts teammate Shelby Bram was also part of Canada's roster. Despite emerging from the 2011 U18 Women's Worlds with a silver medal, Makela was a statistical leader in two categories, including save percentage (.945) and goals against average (1.00).

=== NCAA ===
From 2011 through 2015, Makela played for the Mercyhurst Lakers women's ice hockey team. In her freshman season, Makela occupied a backup role to goaltender Hillary Pattenden. Makela appeared in only three games, making one start. In said start, Makela would record her first win with the Lakers, defeating the now defunct Niagara Purple Eagles. As a sophomore, she ranked 13th overall in the NCAA in goals against average. In the aftermath of her season, she surpassed Desi Clark's program record for most saves in one season, recording 781.

During her senior season (2014–15) with the Mercyhurst Lakers, she was honored as the CHA Conference Goaltender of the Year. Standing between the pipes in 31 games, she finished the season with 20 wins, compared to eight losses and three ties. In addition, she would log a 1.44 goals against average and a .932 save percentage, respectively.

=== Pro hockey ===
Signing with the NWHL's Buffalo Beauts as a free agent on August 11, 2015, Makela served in a backup capacity to goaltender Brianne McLaughlin during the club's inaugural season. Her salary for the 2015-16 Buffalo Beauts season was US$15,000. Of note, she was also selected by the Canadiennes de Montreal in the 2016 CWHL Draft.

== Career stats ==
Season	Team	League	GP	W	L	T	MIN	Sv %	GAA
2011–12	Mercyhurst Lakers	ECAC	3	1	0	0	99:18	.931	1.21
2012–13	Mercyhurst Lakers	ECAC	15	9	5	1	835:07	.911	2.01
2013–14	Mercyhurst Lakers	ECAC	35	22	8	4	2024:46	.925	1.87
2014–15	Mercyhurst Lakers	ECAC	31	20	8	3	1796:41	.932	1.44
2015–16	Buffalo Beauts	NWHL	6	1	2	2	322:52	.909	2.79

== Awards and honours ==
- 2008 Thunder Bay Bantam Boys Best Goalie Award
- 2009 Thunder Bay Queens Most Dedicated Player
- MVP Award at 2010 Esso Cup National Championship
- 2010 Thunder Bay Queens Most Valuable Player
- 2015 College Hockey America Goaltender of the Year Award
