= Hannah McGowan =

American ice hockey player (born 1992)

- Born: 11 August 1992 (age 33); Redford, Michigan, US
- Height: 5 ft 6 in (168 cm)
- Weight: 139 lb (63 kg; 9 st 13 lb)
- Position: Forward
- Shot: Left
- Played for: Neuberg Highlanders; Buffalo Beauts; Adrian Bulldogs
- Playing career: 2011–2017

Hannah McGowan (born 11 August 1992) is an American retired ice hockey player. McGowan played for the Buffalo Beauts of the National Women's Hockey League (NWHL) during their inaugural 2015–16 season.

== Playing career ==
In college, McGowan played ice hockey for Adrian College from 2011 to 2015 in the Northern Collegiate Hockey Association. In her senior year, McGowan served as captain of the women's ice hockey team.

=== NWHL ===
During the inaugural NWHL season of 2015–16, McGowan signed a professional contract with the Buffalo Beauts to play as a forward. McGowan played in all 18 games for the Buffalo Beauts during the season.

=== Europe ===
In 2016, McGowan announced her move to play ice hockey in Austria with the Neuburg Highlanders of the Elite Women's Hockey League (EWHL).
