= Erin Zach =

American ice hockey referee and player

- Born: December 10, 1991 (age 34) Elmira, Ontario, Canada
- Height: 5 ft 2 in (157 cm)
- Weight: 132 lb (60 kg; 9 st 6 lb)
- Position: Forward
- Shot: Left
- Played for: RIT Tigers, Buffalo Beauts, Toronto Furies
- Playing career: 2007–2017

Erin Zach (born December 10, 1991) is a former Canadian ice hockey player and current ice hockey official, having officiated in OWHA competition, International Ice Hockey Federation (IIHF) events, and professional leagues including the Professional Women's Hockey League (PWHL). Of note, Zach officiated at the 2026 Winter Olympics

== Playing career ==
From 2010 to 2014, Zach skated for the Rochester Institute of Technology Tigers. Appearing in 121 games, she registered 86 points.

During the 2015-16 season, Zach played her first season of professional hockey, appearing in 14 games with the Buffalo Beauts. The following season, she signed with the Toronto Furies of the CWHL, and had 19 appearances.

== Officiating career ==
For the 2024–25 PWHL season, Zach was part of the officiating team.

Among Zach's international experience, she has officiated at the 2022 IIHF U18 Women's World Championship, 2023 IIHF Women's World Championship, 2024 IIHF Women's World Championship Division I and the 2025 IIHF Women's World Championship.

In Preliminary Round play for women's ice hockey at the 2026 Winter Olympics, Zach was part of the officiating crew with Cianna Murray, Amanda Tassoni and Kirsten Welsh on February 8, as Czechia blanked Finland by a 2-0 mark.
