= Harrison Browne =

Canadian transgender actor and ice hockey player

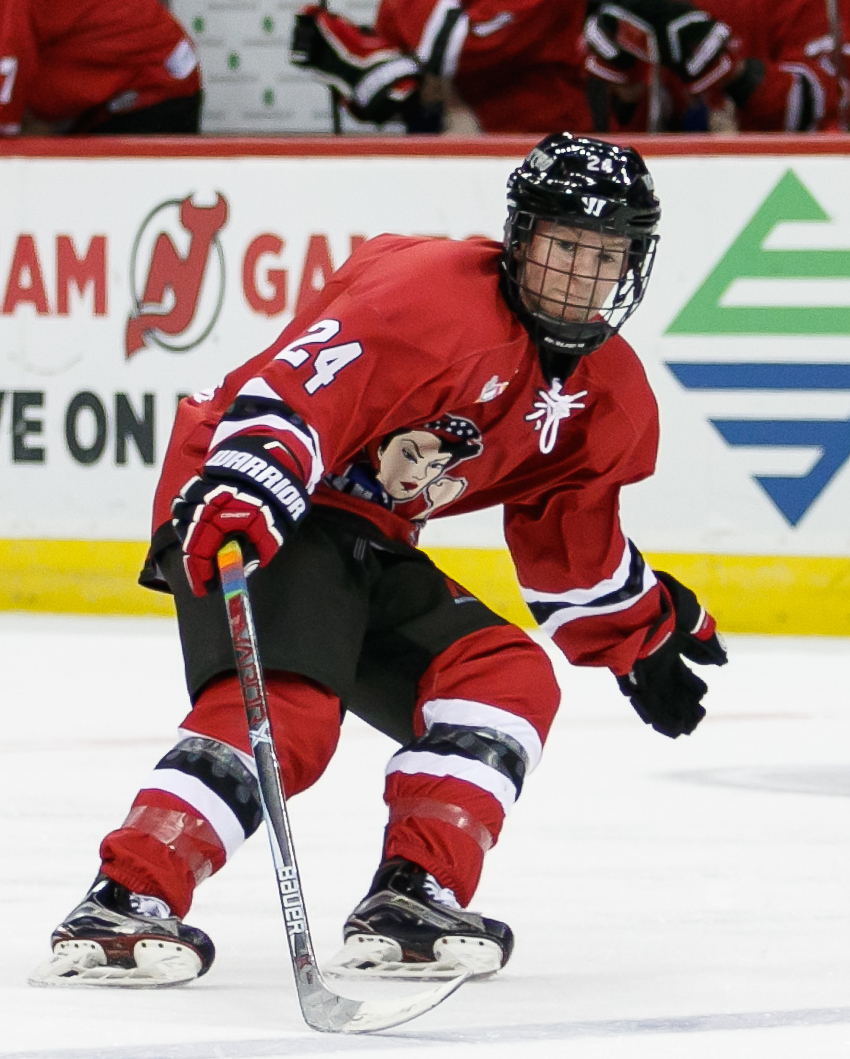
- Browne with the Metropolitan Riveters in 2017
- Born: May 13, 1993 (age 33) Oakville, Ontario, Canada
- Height: 5 ft 5 in (165 cm)
- Weight: 128 lb (58 kg; 9 st 2 lb)
- Position: Centre
- Shot: Left
- Played for: Buffalo Beauts; Metropolitan Riveters
- Playing career: 2015–2018

Harrison Browne (born May 13, 1993) is a Canadian LGBTQ activist, actor, filmmaker, author, and former professional ice hockey player. Before transitioning, he was a centre for the Metropolitan Riveters and Buffalo Beauts of the National Women's Hockey League.

== Early life and career ==
Browne was born on May 13, 1993, in Oakville, Ontario. He started playing ice hockey at nine years old. As a young adult, he attended Appleby College in Oakville. While he was on the school's team, they won two Ontario championships. Browne was a member of the Ontario provincial team that gained the silver medal at the 2011 Canada Winter Games.

He was assigned female at birth and played in women's competitions during his ice hockey career; he came out publicly as a transgender man in 2016 and was the first openly transgender athlete in a professional team sport during his career. About coming out, he said:

I came out publicly in 2016, when I was playing the NWHL. But I had come out in college, already, I think either my sophomore or junior year. I was probably 20 years old when I came out to my teammates at that time. I was always known in the women's hockey world as "the trans man playing on the team," it just wasn't public knowledge at that point. But I did come out four years prior to coming out publicly [as a professional athlete].

== Hockey playing career ==
=== Junior ===
Before entering college, Browne played in the Provincial Women's Hockey League. In the 2009–10 season, he led the Hamilton Jr. Hawks in scoring with 22 goals and 48 points. He moved to the Mississauga Jr. Chiefs the following year.

=== Collegiate ===
Browne received a scholarship to Mercyhurst University and made his NCAA debut on September 30, 2011. With the Mercyhurst Lakers, Browne scored five points in 34 games. After one season with the Lakers, Browne transferred to the University of Maine.

Browne's debut with the Maine Black Bears took place against the Quinnipiac Bobcats on October 12, 2012. He scored his first goal with Maine on January 19, 2013, against the Vermont Catamounts. The last goal of his NCAA career occurred on February 21, 2015, against the UConn Huskies.

=== Professional ===
==== Buffalo Beauts ====
Browne signed a professional contract with the Buffalo Beauts of the newly formed NWHL on August 29, 2015. In the 2015–16 season, he played in 18 games, scored 5 goals and had 12 points. He played in 5 games in the NWHL postseason, scoring 2 goals and 2 assists.

On May 14, 2016, Browne signed a second one-year contract with the Beauts. In October 2016, Browne came out publicly as a transgender man and thus became the first openly transgender athlete in professional American hockey; he had previously privately disclosed his gender identity to coaches while playing at Maine. Browne stated that he would not hormonally transition until the end of his professional playing career, as the hormones involved in female-to-male gender transition violate anti-doping regulations.

Playing for Team Kessel, Browne scored two goals at the 2nd NWHL All-Star Game.

On March 14, 2017, Browne announced he would be retiring from the NWHL at the end of the season to begin hormone replacement therapy and continue his gender transition in privacy. On March 19, 2017, Browne won the Isobel Cup with the Buffalo Beauts, becoming the first openly transgender athlete to win a national championship on a team sport.

==== Metropolitan Riveters ====
On August 7, 2017, he announced he would be putting his retirement on hold and would instead return for the 2017–18 season with the Metropolitan Riveters. On April 25, 2018, Browne won the NWHL championship with the Metropolitan Riveters in the team's first Isobel Cup win.

On April 30, 2018, Browne again announced his retirement from the NWHL.

=== International ===
Medal record

Women's ice hockey

Representing Canada

World U18 Championship
Silver medal – second place	2011 Sweden	

Browne played for Team Canada at the 2011 World U18 Championship, winning the silver medal.

== Post-retirement ==
Since his retirement from the NWHL, Browne has primarily devoted his time to speaking engagements across North America. He has given talks and spoken on panels at colleges, such as Ohio State University, American University, and Fleming College as well as LGBTQ events, such as Outsports Pride.

In 2025, Browne and his sister Rachel released a non-fiction book titled Let Us Play about transgender inclusion in sports.

== Acting career ==
In August 2019, Browne announced on his personal Twitter account that he was beginning a new career as an actor. He emphasized that he plans to advocate for more transgender visibility in his new venture as he had in his athletic career.

Browne has made multiple television appearances since his 2018 retirement. He was featured in an episode of both Y: The Last Man and Murdoch Mysteries, in 2021 and 2022 respectively. In 2023, he appeared in three episodes of the mystery drama series Nancy Drew.

In 2024, Browne began developing a short film, incorporating elements of his own life into the story, and gaining funding on Kickstarter. The film, Pink Light, premiered in the Short Cuts program at the 2025 Toronto International Film Festival. About why he created the film, he said:

It really came from feeling a bit frustrated at the types of trans characters that I was auditioning for, and not feeling like I was getting the opportunities that I wanted to tell a really deep trans story. So I was like, "Well, I gotta create this myself." Then, when it came down to writing it and directing it, I started to really fall in love with that process. The process of directing, in particular, I didn't realize that I would really enjoy.

In 2025, Browne had a minor role in the episode "Rose" in the breakout Canadian LGBTQ+ hockey romance series Heated Rivalry. His character Connors is a member of the fictional team the Boston Raiders, captained by lead character Ilya Rozanov.

== Hockey career statistics ==
=== Regular season and playoffs ===
			Regular season					Playoffs
Season	Team	League	GP	G	A	Pts	PIM	GP	G	A	Pts	PIM
2008–09	Oakville Jr. Ice	Prov. WHL	2	0	0	0	0	—	—	—	—	—
2009–10	Hamilton Jr. Hawks	Prov. WHL	28	9	9	18	55	—	—	—	—	—
2010–11	Mississauga Jr. Chiefs	Prov. WHL	31	14	16	30	54	—	—	—	—	—
2011–12	Mercyhurst University	CHA	32	3	2	5	12	3	0	0	0	2
2012–13	University of Maine	HE	33	2	4	6	38	—	—	—	—	—
2013–14	University of Maine	HE	30	3	7	10	49	—	—	—	—	—
2014–15	University of Maine	HE	33	7	10	17	34	2	0	0	0	0
2015–16	Buffalo Beauts	NWHL	18	5	7	12	26	5	2	2	4	10
2016–17	Buffalo Beauts	NWHL	17	2	4	6	22	2	0	0	0	2
2017–18	Metropolitan Riveters	NWHL	16	3	6	9	8	2	0	1	1	0
NWHL totals			51	10	17	27	56	9	2	3	5	12

=== International ===
Year	Team	Event	Result	GP	G	A	Pts	PIM
2011	Canada	U18	2nd place, silver medalist(s)	5	0	0	0	8
Junior totals				5	0	0	0	8

== Filmography ==
=== Film ===
Year	Title	Role	Notes
2020	Keep Your Condolences	Frankie	Short
2020	Spelled	Liam	Short
2021	On the Fringe of Wild	Peter	
2022	A Shade of Blue	Sawyer	Short
2023	Playboy of the Dundas Western World	Tumnus	Short
2025	The Bearded Girl	The Masked Cowboy	
2025	Maya & Samar	Richard	
2025	Pink Light	Scott	Short. Main role; also director and writer.

=== Television ===
Year	Title	Role	Notes
2021	Y: The Last Man	Silas	1 episode
2022	1 Queen 5 Queers	Self	Panelist; 1 episode
2022	Murdoch Mysteries	Fink	1 episode
2023	Nancy Drew	Cameron	3 episodes
2025	PeopleWatching		2 episodes
2025	Heated Rivalry	Connors	2 episodes
