= Kimberly Sass =

American ice hockey player (born 1990)

- Born: November 5, 1990 (age 35) East Amherst, New York, United States
- Height: 165 cm (5 ft 5 in)
- Position: Goaltender
- PWHPA team Former teams: New Hampshire; Buffalo Beauts; Metropolitan Riveters; Colgate University
- Playing career: 2015–present

Kimberly Allison Sass is an American architect and professional ice hockey goaltender, currently playing with the New Hampshire section of the Professional Women's Hockey Players Association (PWHPA) and serving on the PWHPA board of directors.

== Career ==
Sass began playing ice sports at the age of three, originally doing figure skating before being asked by the coach of the local girls team if she and her sister wanted to switch to ice hockey.

From 2008 to 2012, she played for Colgate University while studying. Across her four years at the university and 93 NCAA games, she finished second in program history in minutes played, saves, and wins. In 2011, she became the fourth goalie in the university's history to make 50 saves in a game, making 58 saves in a 6-2 loss to Cornell.

When the National Women's Hockey League (NWHL) was formed in 2015, she signed her first professional contract with the Buffalo Beauts. She would only play two games for the team during the 2015-16 NWHL season, however, before choosing to take a year away from hockey to focus on her architectural career. During the 2017-18 NWHL season, she was contacted by the Metropolitan Riveters, who offered her a position as a backup goaltender. After playing one game for the team in 2017-18, she dressed for the full 2018-19 season, posting a .885 save percentage across 12 games.

After the collapse of the CWHL in May 2019, she joined the #ForTheGame players' strike movement. As the movement consolidated into the PWHPA, she was named to the organization's nine-member board of directors. She spoke out publicly about having had to pay to play professional hockey, her $2,500 salary not enough to cover the cost of equipment and travel after taxes, and about her frustrations with trying to convince people that she was a professional athlete, adding that she didn't want to be a "role model for multi-tasking" due to having to work two jobs.

During the 2019–20 PWHPA season, she trained with the Tri-State hub. She was one of five PWHPA players who participated in a charity game at Madison Square Garden in January 2020 along with several ex-NHL players, as part of The Last Game series to raise awareness of the impact of the climate crisis. She was chosen as one of the players to accompany the PWHPA in a Dream Gap Tour showcase in Tokyo, Japan, in March 2020 before the season was halted due to the COVID-19 pandemic.

For the 2020–21 season, she was named to the roster of the New Hampshire hub. She played in the first games of the season, exhibition matches against USPHL teams.

== Personal life ==
She has a bachelor's degree in art and geography from Colgate University and a master's degree in architecture from the University at Buffalo. She has publicly advocated for the inclusion of girls in STEM, hosted a booth at the 2019 American Academy of Arts and Sciences annual meeting, and appeared in the 2019 Mission Unstoppable TV series, hosted by Miranda Cosgrove.
