= Kourtney Kunichika =

American ice hockey player

- Born: November 7, 1991 (age 33); Fullerton, California
- Height: 5 ft 5 in (165 cm)
- Position: Forward
- Shot: Right
- Played for: Buffalo Beauts; RIT Tigers
- Playing career: 2015–2018

Kourtney Midori Kunichika (born November 7, 1991) is an American former professional ice hockey forward, who played for the Buffalo Beauts in the NWHL. She is the third highest scorer in Beauts history.

== Early life ==
Kunichika began playing ice hockey at the age of 10. Prior to that, she had played roller hockey in her hometown state of California.

== Career ==
=== College ===
Kunichika played four seasons of collegiate hockey at Rochester Institute of Technology (RIT) between 2010 and 2014. She scored 136 points in 129 career games and remains RIT's leader in career games played.

=== NWHL ===
She signed with the Buffalo Beauts of the National Women's Hockey League (NWHL) in August 2015.

In 2017, she won the Isobel Cup with the Beauts.

In 2018, she announced her retirement from professional hockey.

== Playing style ==
She was noted for her strong two-way play as well as her creativity. She spent her three years in the NWHL as the Beauts' top centre, often leading the team in faceoffs and on the power-play. Never making an All-Star game appearance, she was considered by some to be one of the underrated players of the league.

== Personal life ==
Kunichika currently owns and runs a Hawaiian restaurant in Batavia, New York with her wife. She had worked in the restaurant industry during her professional career with the Beauts.

== Career statistics ==
| | | | Regular season | | | | | Playoffs |
| Season | Team | League | GP | G | A | Pts | PIM | GP | G | A | Pts | PIM |
|---|---|---|---|---|---|---|---|---|---|---|---|---|
| 2015-16 | Buffalo Beauts | NWHL | 18 | 9 | 8 | 17 | 4 | 5 | 0 | 1 | 1 | 2 |
| 2016-17 | Buffalo Beauts | NWHL | 17 | 2 | 9 | 11 | 6 | 2 | 0 | 0 | 0 | 0 |
| 2017-18 | Buffalo Beauts | NWHL | 15 | 4 | 10 | 14 | 8 | 2 | 0 | 1 | 1 | 2 |
| NWHL totals | | | 50 | 15 | 27 | 42 | 18 | 9 | 0 | 2 | 2 | 4 |

== Awards and honours ==
- NWHL Co-Player of the Week, Awarded February 28, 2018
