= Megan Bozek =

American ice hockey player (born 1991)

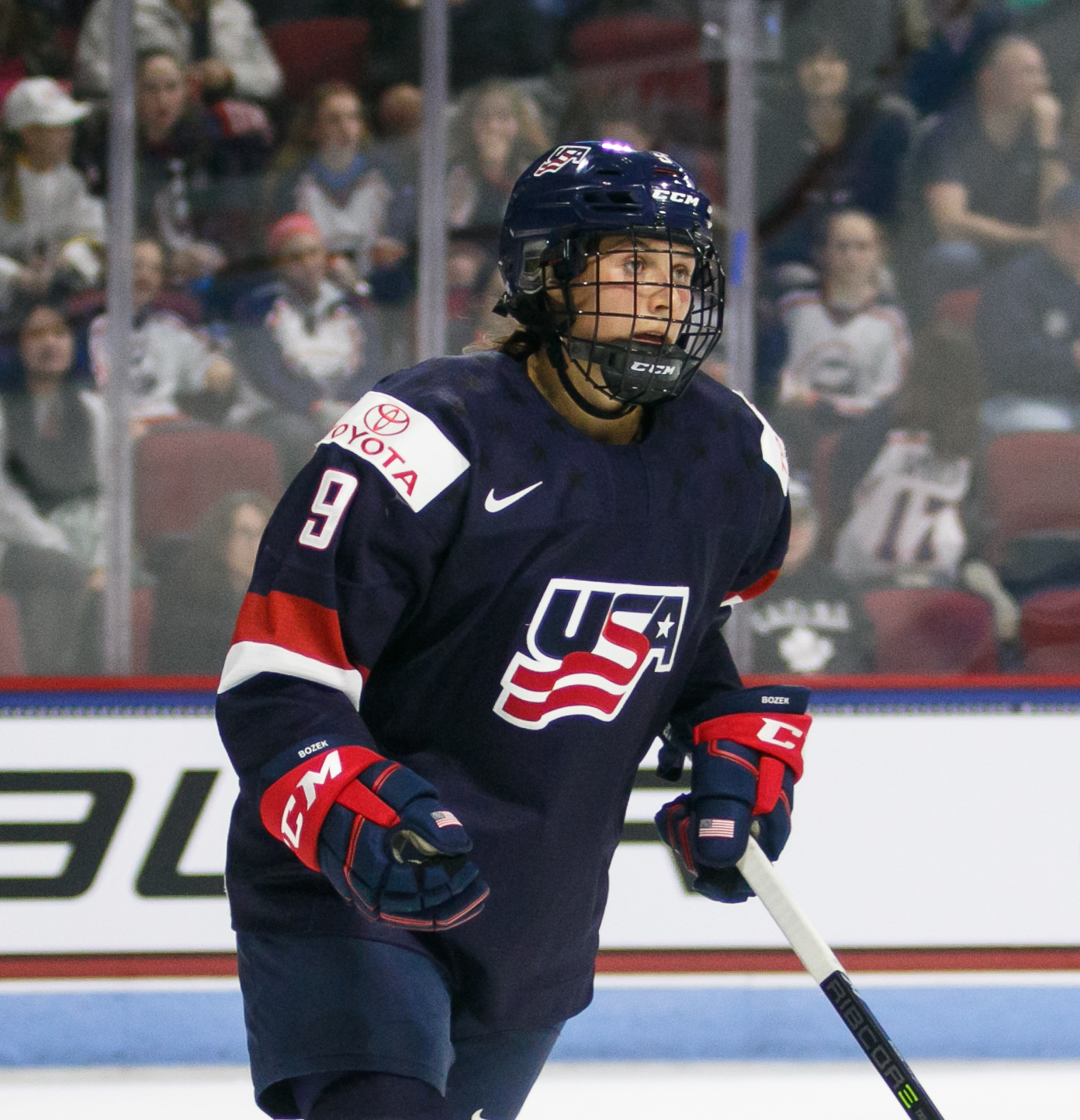
- Megan Bozek playing for Team USA in 2017
- Born: March 27, 1991 (age 35) Buffalo Grove, Illinois, U.S.
- Height: 5 ft 8 in (173 cm)
- Weight: 176 lb (80 kg; 12 st 8 lb)
- Position: Defense
- Shoots: Right
- Played for: KRS Vanke Rays; Markham Thunder; Buffalo Beauts; Toronto Furies; Minnesota Golden Gophers
- National team: United States
- Playing career: 2009–present
Medal record
Olympic Games
Silver medal – second place	2014 Sochi	Team
Silver medal – second place	2022 Beijing	Team
World Championships
Gold medal – first place	2013 Canada
Gold medal – first place	2016 Canada
Gold medal – first place	2017 United States
Gold medal – first place	2019 Finland
Silver medal – second place	2012 United States
Silver medal – second place	2021 Canada
World U18 Championships
Gold medal – first place	2009 Germany

Megan Bozek (born March 27, 1991) is an American ice hockey player and member of the United States national team. She most recently played with the KRS Vanke Rays of the Zhenskaya Hockey League (ZhHL) during the 2020–21 season.

Bozek played her collegiate career with the Minnesota Golden Gophers women's ice hockey program. She was selected second overall by the Toronto Furies in the 2014 CWHL Draft and, over her career, has played in the Canadian Women's Hockey League (CWHL), National Women's Hockey League (NWHL), and the Zhenskaya Hockey League (ZhHL). She is married to her husband, Andrew and they have one child together born December 2023, Beckett.

== Playing career ==
=== NCAA ===
Bozek joined the Minnesota Golden Gophers in the autumn of 2009. By season's end, she tied for fifth on the team in scoring and second among defenders.

=== USA Hockey ===
During the 2007–08 season, Bozek was a member of the U.S. Under-22 Team. She logged two assists in the gold medal game of the 2009 IIHF World Women's U18 Championship.

On January 2, 2022, Bozek was named to Team USA's roster to represent the United States at the 2022 Winter Olympics.

=== Canadian Women's Hockey League (CWHL) ===
On August 19, 2014, Bozek was picked second overall in the 2014 CWHL Draft by the Toronto Furies.

She played with the Markham Thunder for the 2017–18 and 2018–19 CWHL seasons.

=== National Women's Hockey League (NWHL) ===
On September 25, 2015, Bozek signed with the Buffalo Beauts of the National Women's Hockey League (NWHL). Selected to participate in the inaugural NWHL All-Star Game, Bozek won the hardest shot competition. Bozek and the Beauts finished their inaugural season by playing for the inaugural Isobel Cup finals.

On July 31, 2016, Bozek re-signed with Buffalo, on a one-year contract for $22,500, making her the highest-paid player in the history of the Beauts. Playing for Team Kessel, Bozek scored a goal at the 2nd NWHL All-Star Game. Bozek scored a goal in the Isobel Cup Final against the Boston Pride, which the Beauts won by a final score of 3–2, making the Beauts the 2017 Isobel Cup Champions.

== Career stats ==
=== NCAA ===
==== Minnesota ====
Season	GP	G	A	Pts	PIM	PPG	SHG	GWG
2009–10	40	6	18	24	40	6	0	1
2010–11	37	6	17	23	70	3	0	3
2011–12	39	15	27	42	34	8	0	3
2012–13	41	20	37	57	34	9	1	3
Total	157	47	99	146	178	26	1	10

=== CWHL ===
Year	Team	Games Played	Goals	Assists	Points	+/-	PIM	PPG	SHG	GWG
2014–15	Toronto Furies	22	3	7	10	−11	10	2	0	0

== Awards and honors ==
- 2010 Second Team All-WCHA
- 2010 WCHA All-Rookie Team
- WCHA Defensive Player of the Week (Week of December 7, 2011)
- 2011 WCHA Tournament team
- 2011–12 CCM Hockey Women's Division I All-American, First Team
- 2011–12 Minnesota Golden Gophers Female Athlete of the Year
- 2012 NCAA All-Tournament team
- NWHL Player of the Week, (Week of January 5, 2016)
- NWHL Best Defender award for 2017
