= Devon Skeats =

Canadian ice hockey player

- Born: June 21, 1991 (age 35) Whitby, Ontario, Canada
- Height: 165 cm (5 ft 5 in)
- Position: Forward
- Shot: Left
- Played for: Markham Thunder; Buffalo Beauts; Neuberg Highlanders; Wilfrid Laurier University
- Playing career: 2009–2019

Devon Skeats is a retired Canadian ice hockey forward, who played for the Markham Thunder of the Canadian Women's Hockey League (CWHL) and the Buffalo Beauts of the National Women's Hockey League (NWHL), winning both an Isobel Cup and a Clarkson Cup.

== Career ==
From 2009 to 2014, she attended Wilfrid Laurier University in Ontario, scoring 87 points in 117 USports games and winning three OUA championships, in 2010, 2012, and 2014.

After graduating, she moved to Austria to sign with the Neuberg Highlanders in the European Women's Hockey League. She scored 22 points in 19 games during the 2014-15 EWHL season, fourth in the league in goals, as the Highlanders finished in third place in the Austrian domestic cup. During the season, she also made an appearance for an Austrian men's Division III team.

When the NWHL was founded by Dani Rylan in 2015, she returned to North America to sign with the Buffalo Beauts, the first Canadian Interuniversity Sport player to sign in the league. After missing the first few games of the season due to visa issues, on the 15th of November 2015 she scored her first NWHL goal, becoming the first Canadian player to score in Beauts' history. She named to the 1st NWHL All-Star Game via an online fan vote, garnering 4726 votes, and would become the first Canadian player to score in an NWHL all-star game during the match.

Her production dipped during the 2016–17 season, only notching six points in fifteen games for the Beauts. In February 2017, she received a suspension, violating the league's three strikes policy after being assessed penalties for two slew foot infractions and one hit from behind. The Beauts would finish the season as Isobel Cup champions.

For the 2017–18 season, she left the NWHL to join the Canadian Women's Hockey League's Markham Thunder. She scored 6 points in 28 games in her debut CWHL season, as Markham won the Clarkson Cup.

== Personal life ==
In 2015, she participated in the inaugural Women's Physical Readiness Evaluation for Police Challenge put on by the Ontario Police College, easily passing the police recruitment requirements. She currently works as a police officer for the Toronto Police Service.

In 2016, she became one of the first women to join the coaching staff of NHLer Wayne Simmonds' ball hockey charity Wayne's Road Hockey Warriors. In 2017, she became the first NWHL player to play for Canada at the International Street and Ball Hockey Federation Women's World Championships.
