= Buffalo Beauts =

Former women's professional ice hockey team in Amherst, New York

- City: Amherst, New York
- League: Premier Hockey Federation
- Founded: 2015
- Folded: 2023
- Home arena: Northtown Center
- Colors: Blue, black, silver, white
- Website: Official website

Championships
- Playoff championships: 2016–17

The Buffalo Beauts were a professional ice hockey team in the Premier Hockey Federation (PHF). They played in Amherst, New York, a suburb of Buffalo, at the Northtown Center.

The Beauts were established in 2015 as one of the four founding franchises of the National Women's Hockey League (NWHL), rebranded as the PHF in 2021. The team played at Harborcenter in downtown Buffalo during their first four seasons. The team advanced to the Isobel Cup Finals in the PHF's first four seasons, winning the championship title in 2016–17. The team folded in 2023 after the PHF and its assets were purchased and dissolved as part of the process of creating a new, unified professional league, the Professional Women's Hockey League.

== History ==
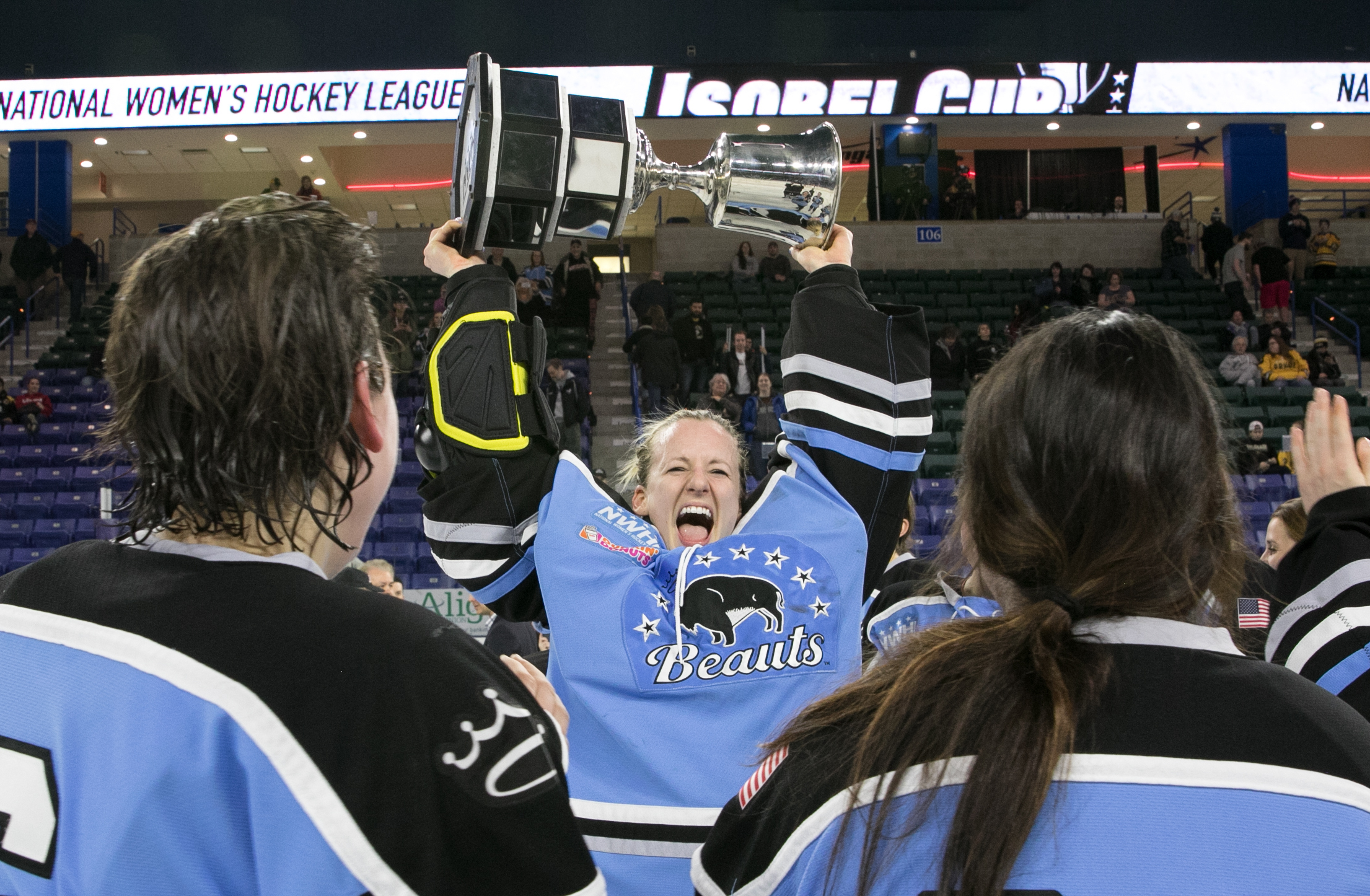
Brianne McLaughlin celebrating after winning the 2017 Isobel Cup

The Beauts held their first summer free agent camp on May 23 and 24, 2015. In July 2015, the Beauts signed free agent and 2-time Team USA Olympic goaltender Brianne McLaughlin, making her the first player to sign a contract with the franchise.

The team made its debut at home on October 11, 2015 in a 4–1 loss versus the Boston Pride. During a 5–3 home loss against the Boston Pride on October 25, 2015, Brianne McLaughlin allowed three goals by Brianna Decker, resulting in the first hat trick in NWHL history.

The Beauts finished the regular season third out of four teams. In the semifinals of the inaugural Isobel Cup championships, the Beauts faced the Connecticut Whale. The Whale had a perfect record against the Beauts in the regular season, but the Beauts upset the Whale by winning the last two games in the best-of-three series. They advanced to the championship series, but dropped two games in succession and were swept by the Boston Pride.

On October 7, 2016, Beauts forward Harrison Browne came out as a transgender man and thus became the first openly transgender athlete in professional American team sports. That same year the Beauts won the 2016–17 Isobel Cup Championship in an upset win over the defending champion Boston Pride. This was Buffalo's first professional hockey championship since the Buffalo Bisons of the American Hockey League won the 1970 Calder Cup.

The Beauts signed three superstars from the CWHL's Brampton Thunder on August 31, 2017, adding Jess Jones, Sarah Edney, and Rebecca Vint for the 2017–18 season.

On December 21, 2017, Pegula Sports and Entertainment (PSE), owners of the Buffalo Bills, Buffalo Sabres and Harborcenter, announced it had purchased the Beauts. This made the Beauts the first team in the NWHL not owned by the league and the first professional women's hockey team in North America to be owned by the same organization of its market's NHL team.

On June 27, 2018, the Beauts signed Team Canada goaltender Shannon Szabados. Szabados had previously only played professional hockey on men's leagues such as the Southern Professional Hockey League and is the first woman to record a shutout in men's league.

On December 7, 2018, the Beauts suddenly relieved Ric Seiling as head coach, replacing him with former Buffalo Sabre and Harborcenter Academy of Hockey coach Cody McCormick on an interim basis.

On May 8, 2019, following the announcement of a professional women's hockey player strike, Pegula Sports and Entertainment (PSE) relinquished ownership of the team back to the NWHL. Under Pegula, the Beauts were considered a well-run operation, with the team sharing resources and training facilities with the Sabres and Rochester Americans. Szabados cited the amenities provided to the Beauts' players through the partnership as one of the goals of the strike for the rest of professional women's hockey.

While the Beauts played at the Harborcenter, in the NWHL's largest arena by capacity, they consistently led the NWHL in attendance for the first few seasons until they were surpassed by the Minnesota Whitecaps in 2018–19. The league indicated that it wanted to keep the team playing at the Harborcenter, which is owned by PSE, but the severance also required the team to negotiate an arena lease.

On June 25, 2019, PSE sent a cease and desist letter to the NWHL for using the Beauts' name and brand. As part of the original agreement, PSE obtained the trademarks associated with the team and formed a separate entity called Buffalo Beauts Hockey to operate the team. While PSE verbally agreed to relinquished ownership and operations of the team, the NWHL apparently did not sign the transfer paperwork before the deadline, leading to PSE's cease and desist letter. As PSE still owned the Beauts' branding as of July 2 while the NWHL continued to use the Beauts' name, but the team eventually retained the name. The league then moved the Beauts' home games to the Northtown Center in nearby Amherst prior to the 2019–20 season.

Due to the ongoing COVID-19 pandemic, the 2020–21 NWHL season was scheduled as a single-site bubble tournament to be played over two weeks at Herb Brooks Arena in Lake Placid, New York, from January 23 to February 5, 2021. However, the bubble season came to a premature end following several positive cases of COVID-19. After the Metropolitan Riveters were forced to withdraw on January 28, Buffalo was in last place. The final games of the regular season were rescheduled with the top three teams playing a round-robin for seeding in the Isobel Cup playoffs, while the Beauts would face the Boston Pride in a three-game play-in series for the fourth seed. Prior to the third game on February 1, Connecticut also withdrew from Lake Placid over health and safety concerns, causing the Beauts/Pride series to be for the third and fourth seeds with the Beauts losing the game 1–7. By February 3, the league completely postponed the Isobel Cup playoffs and ended the Lake Placid event. On March 8, the league announced the new schedule for the playoffs to take place on March 26 and 27 at Warrior Ice Arena in Brighton, Massachusetts. Due to the postponement, Connecticut was given the third seed and the Beauts were eliminated from participation in the postseason.

On June 28, 2021, the league announced the sale of the Beauts and Minnesota Whitecaps to a joint partnership of NLTT Ventures, LLC, led by Andy Scurto, and Top Tier Sports, led by Neil Leibman. Scurto was named the team's governor.

In the summer of 2023, it was announced that the PHF and its assets had been purchased, and that the league and its teams would be dissolved as part of the foundation of a unified women's league, the Professional Women's Hockey League. Buffalo was not included among the cities that would host the PWHL teams, leaving the city without professional women's hockey. All of the Beauts' contracts were voided as part of the transition.

== Season-by-season records ==
Note: GP = Games played, W = Wins, L = Losses, OTL = Overtime losses, SOL = Shootout losses, Pts = Points, GF = Goals for, GA = Goals against

Season	GP	W	L	OTL	SOL	Pts (Note: Starting with the 2021–22 season, 3 points are awarded for a regulation win, 2 points are awarded for an overtime/shootout win, 1 point is awarded for an overtime/shootout loss, 0 points are awarded for a regulation loss)	GF	GA	Playoffs
2015–16	18	5	9	4	0	14	57	66	Lost Isobel Cup Championship to Boston Pride
2016–17	17	6	10	1	0	13	44	68	Won Isobel Cup Championship over Boston Pride
2017–18	16	12	4	0	—	24	51	41	Lost Isobel Cup Championship to Metropolitan Riveters
2018–19	16	11	4	0	1	23	57	25	Lost Isobel Cup Championship to Minnesota Whitecaps
2019–20	24	8	15	1	—	17	71	116	Lost play-in game to Connecticut Whale
2020–21	6	1	4	0	1	3	7	24	did not qualify
2021–22	20	6	14	0	—	15	44	73	Lost Qualifying Round to Minnesota Whitecaps
2022–23	24	5	16	3	—	18	50	95	did not qualify
PHF Totals	141	54	76	9	2	127	381	508	

== Team ==
=== 2022–23 roster ===
As of November 5, 2022

No.	Nat	Player	Pos	S/G	Age	Acquired	Birthplace
-	(Denmark)	Amalie Andersen	D	L	26	2023	Herning, Denmark
14	(United States)	Allison Attea	D	L	27	2021	Buffalo, New York
88	(Sweden)	Lovisa Berndtsson	G	L	37	2021	Stockholm, Sweden
61	(United States)	Michaela Boyle	F	–	26	2022	Reading, Massachusetts
24	(United States)	Anjelica Diffendal	F	R	27	2021	Pittsburgh, Pennsylvania
67	(Canada)	Summer-Rae Dobson	F	R	27	2022	Huntsville, Ontario
77	(Canada)	Whitney Dove	D	R	28	2020	Port Moody, British Columbia
2	(Canada)	Samantha Fieseler	D	L	29	2021	Kelowna, British Columbia
59	(Canada)	Mikyla Grant-Mentis	F	L	27	2022	Brampton, Ontario
47	(Canada)	Jessica Healey	D	L	29	2022	Edmonton, Alberta
31	(Canada)	Tera Hofmann (PTO)	G	L	27	2022	Toronto, Ontario
34	(United States)	Claudia Kepler (A)	F	R	30	2021	Verona, Wisconsin
94	(United States)	Grace Klienbach	F	R	32	2021	Eustis, Florida
13	(United States)	Dominique Kremer (C)	D	R	29	2020	Hudson, Iowa
9	(Canada)	Autumn MacDougall	F	L	28–29	2020	Dartmouth, Nova Scotia
17	(Canada)	Cassidy MacPherson (A)	F	L	28	2019	Oakville, Ontario
23	(Austria)	Antonia Matzka	D	L	27	2022	Mödling, Austria
42	(Canada)	Courtney Maud	F	L	27	2022	Georgetown, Ontario
11	(United States)	Madi Nichols	F	L	25	2022	Trinity, Florida
16	(Finland)	Emma Nuutinen	F	L	29	2022	Vantaa, Finland
32	(Canada)	Kassidy Sauvé	G	L	30	2022	Whitby, Ontario
44	(Finland)	Jenna Suokko	F	L	31	2021	Tampere, Finland
10	(United States)	Madison Truax	D	R	27	2022	Gardner, Massachusetts

Coaching staff and team personnel

- Head coach: Rhea Coad
- Assistant coach: Julia DiTondo
- Assistant coach: Mark Zarbo
- Goaltending coach: Shane Madolora
- Video & analytics: Chris Baudo

=== Team captains ===
- Emily Pfalzer, 2015–2017
- Corinne Buie, 2017–2020
- Taylor Accursi, 2020–21 (Note: Was named captain prior to 2020–21 NWHL season, but could not participate in the bubble season due to her regular job in Ontario.)
- Marie-Jo Pelletier, 2021-22
- Dominique Kremer, 2022–2023

=== Head coaches ===
- Shelley Looney, Ric Seiling 2015–2016
- Ric Seiling and Craig Muni, 2016–2018
- Cody McCormick, 2018–2019
- Pete Perram, 2019–2021
- Rhea Coad, 2021–2023

=== General managers ===
- Linda Mroz, 2015–2016
- Nik Fattey, 2016–2019
- Cody McCormick, 2019
- Mandy Cronin, 2019–2020
- Nate Oliver, 2020–2023

== Draft history ==
Courtney Burke from the Wisconsin Badgers women's ice hockey program became the first player in franchise history to be selected in the inaugural 2015 NWHL Draft. Raised in the state capital of Albany, New York, Burke was also the first defensewoman selected in NWHL Draft history.

=== 2015 ===
The following are the Beauts' selections from the 2015 NWHL Draft of college players in their junior year held on June 20, 2015. Note: The team has not announced any contract signings from this list to date. A player who is drafted but does not sign with the organization that selected her, may enter free-agency after completing her senior year.

#	Player	Position	Nationality	College
4	Courtney Burke	Defense	United States	University of Wisconsin
8	Sarah Lefort	Forward	Canada	Boston University
12	Amanda Leveille	Goaltender	Canada	University of Minnesota
16	Emily Janiga	Forward	United States	Mercyhurst
20	Jenna Dingeldein	Forward	Canada	Mercyhurst

== Media ==
In local Media the Buffalo Beauts were covered by The Buffalo News. Home games were broadcast live by 716 Sports Podcast via Steve Bermel (Play by Play) and Justen Ehrig (color commentary) and games were live-streamed to twitch.tv/nwhl.

== Franchise milestones ==
Milestone	Player	Date
First goal	Kelley Steadman	October 11, 2015
First win	Brianne McLaughlin	November 29, 2015
First Isobel Cup goal	Shelby Bram	March 11, 2016
First championship MVP	Brianne McLaughlin	March 19, 2017
First shutout	Amanda Leveille	January 27, 2018

== Awards and honors ==
- Megan Bozek, 2017 Defensive Player of the Year Award
- Maddie Elia, 2019 Most Valuable Player
- Hayley Scamurra, 2019 Scoring Champion, 2019 Players' Top Player of the Year
- Shannon Szabados, 2019 Goaltender of the Year
- Blake Bolden, 2019 Defender of the Year
- Carly Jackson, 2021 Foundation Award, 2021 Fans' Three Stars
