= List of Boston Pride records =

This is a list of franchise records for the Boston Pride of the Premier Hockey Federation.

== Regular season ==
=== All players ===
==== Points ====
Player	Ctry	Pos	GP	Pts
Hilary Knight	(United States)	F	17	33
Brianna Decker	(United States)	F	17	29
Jordan Smelker	(United States)	F	17	19
Gisele Marvin	(United States)	D	17	14
Jillian Dempsey	(United States)	F	18	14

==== Goals ====
Player	Ctry	Pos	GP	G
Hilary Knight	(United States)	F	17	15
Brianna Decker	(United States)	F	17	14
Jordan Smelker	(United States)	F	17	9
Amanda Pelkey	(United States)	F	17	7
Jillian Dempsey	(United States)	F	18	7

==== Assists ====
Player	Ctry	Pos	GP	A
Hilary Knight	(United States)	F	17	18
Brianna Decker	(United States)	F	17	15
Kacey Bellamy	(United States)	D	15	12
Jordan Smelker	(United States)	F	17	10
Gisele Marvin	(United States)	D	17	9

==== Games played ====
Player	Ctry	Pos	GP
Blake Bolden	(United States)	D	18
Corinne Buie	(United States)	F	18
Emily Field	(United States)	F	18
Jillian Dempsey	(United States)	F	18
Kelly Cooke	(United States)	F	18

==== Penalty minutes ====
Player	Ctry	Pos	GP	PIM
Brianna Decker	(United States)	F	17	20
Rachel Llanes	(United States)	F	17	20
Marissa Gedman	(United States)	F	18	16
Zoe Hickel	(United States)	F	17	14
Amanda Pelkey	(United States)	D	15	12

==== Game-winning goals ====
Player	Ctry	Pos	GWG
Hilary Knight	(United States)	F	5
Gisele Marvin	(United States)	D	3
Rachel Llanes	(United States)	F	2
Jillian Dempsey	(United States)	F	2
Brianna Decker	(United States)	F	1

==== Power-play goals ====
Player	Ctry	Pos	PP
Brianna Decker	(United States)	F	3
Amanda Pelkey	(United States)	F	2
Gisele Marvin	(United States)	D	2
Hilary Knight	(United States)	F	2
Jordan Smelker	(United States)	F	2

==== Short-handed goals ====
Player	Ctry	Pos	SH
Brianna Decker	(United States)	F	3
Gisele Marvin	(United States)	D	1
Emily Field	(United States)	F	1
Amanda Pelkey	(United States)	F	0
Blake Bolden	(United States)	D	0

=== Defensemen ===
==== Points ====
Player	Ctry	GP	Pts
Gisele Marvin	(United States)	17	14
Kacey Bellamy	(United States)	15	14
Blake Bolden	(United States)	18	9
Alyssa Gagliardi	(United States)	17	6
Marissa Gedman	(United States)	18	6

=== Goaltenders ===
==== Games played ====
Player	Ctry	GP
Brittany Ott	(United States)	17
Lauren Slebodnick	(United States)	4
Kelsie Fralick	(United States)	1

==== Wins ====
Player	Ctry	GP	W
Brittany Ott	(United States)	17	12
Lauren Slebodnick	(United States)	4	1

*minimum of 60 minutes played

==== Shutouts ====
Player	Ctry	GP	SO
Brittany Ott	(United States)	17	1
Lauren Slebodnick	(United States)	4	0

*minimum of 60 minutes played

==== Goals against average ====
Player	Ctry	GP	GAA
Brittany Ott	(United States)	17	1.94
Lauren Slebodnick	(United States)	4	3.30

*minimum of 60 minutes played

==== Save percentage ====
Player	Ctry	GP	SV%
Brittany Ott	(United States)	15	.925
Lauren Slebodnick	(United States)	4	.883

*minimum of 60 minutes played

== Playoffs ==
=== All players ===
==== Points ====
Player	Ctry	Pos	GP	Pts
Hilary Knight	(United States)	F	0	0
Brianna Decker	(United States)	F	0	0
Jordan Smelker	(United States)	F	0	0
Jillian Dempsey	(United States)	F	0	0
Amanda Pelkey	(United States)	F	0	0

==== Goals ====
Player	Ctry	Pos	GP	G
Hilary Knight	(United States)	F	0	0
Brianna Decker	(United States)	F	0	0
Jordan Smelker	(United States)	F	0	0
Jillian Dempsey	(United States)	F	0	0
Amanda Pelkey	(United States)	F	0	0

==== Assists ====
Player	Ctry	Pos	GP	A
Hilary Knight	(United States)	F	0	0
Brianna Decker	(United States)	F	0	0
Jordan Smelker	(United States)	F	0	0
Jillian Dempsey	(United States)	F	0	0
Amanda Pelkey	(United States)	F	0	0

==== Games played ====
Player	Ctry	Pos	GP
Hilary Knight	(United States)	F	0
Brianna Decker	(United States)	F	0
Jordan Smelker	(United States)	F	0
Jillian Dempsey	(United States)	F	0
Amanda Pelkey	(United States)	F	0

==== Penalty minutes ====
Player	Ctry	Pos	GP	PIM
Hilary Knight	(United States)	F	0	0
Brianna Decker	(United States)	F	0	0
Jordan Smelker	(United States)	F	0	0
Jillian Dempsey	(United States)	F	0	0
Amanda Pelkey	(United States)	F	0	0

==== Game-winning goals ====
Player	Ctry	Pos	GWG
Hilary Knight	(United States)	F	0
Brianna Decker	(United States)	F	0
Jordan Smelker	(United States)	F	0
Jillian Dempsey	(United States)	F	0
Amanda Pelkey	(United States)	F	0

==== Power play goals ====
Player	Ctry	Pos	PP
Hilary Knight	(United States)	F	0
Brianna Decker	(United States)	F	0
Jordan Smelker	(United States)	F	0
Jillian Dempsey	(United States)	F	0
Amanda Pelkey	(United States)	F	0

==== Short-handed goals ====
Player	Ctry	Pos	SH
Hilary Knight	(United States)	F	0
Brianna Decker	(United States)	F	0
Jordan Smelker	(United States)	F	0
Jillian Dempsey	(United States)	F	0
Amanda Pelkey	(United States)	F	0

=== Defensemen ===
==== Points ====
Player	Ctry	GP	Pts
Kacey Bellamy	(United States)	0	0
Gisele Marvin	(United States)	0	0
Blake Bolden	(United States)	0	0
Alyssa Gagliardi	(United States)	0	0
Marissa Gedman	(United States)	0	0

=== Goaltenders ===
==== Games played ====
Player	Ctry	GP
Brittany Ott	(United States)	0
Lauren Slebodnick	(United States)	0
Kelsie Fralick	(United States)	0

==== Wins ====
Player	Ctry	GP	W
Brittany Ott	(United States)	0	0
Lauren Slebodnick	(United States)	0	0
Kelsie Fralick	(United States)	0	0

==== Goals against average ====
Player	Ctry	GP	GAA
Brittany Ott	(United States)	0	0.00
Lauren Slebodnick	(United States)	0	0.00
Kelsie Fralick	(United States)	0	0.00

==== Save percentage ====
Player	Ctry	GP	SV%
Brittany Ott	(United States)	0	1.000
Lauren Slebodnick	(United States)	0	1.000
Kelsie Fralick	(United States)	0	1.000

==== Shutouts ====
Player	Ctry	GP	SO
Brittany Ott	(United States)	0	0
Lauren Slebodnick	(United States)	0	0
Kelsie Fralick	(United States)	0	0

== Franchise records ==
=== Franchise single season ===
Most points	29	2015-16
Most wins	14	2015-16
Most losses	3	2015-16
Most overtime losses	1	2015-16
Most goals for	75	2015-16
Most goals against	39	2015-16
Fewest points	29	2015-16
Fewest wins	14	2015-16
Fewest losses	3	2015-16
Fewest overtime losses	1	2015-16
Fewest goals for	75	2015-16
Fewest goals against	39	2015-16
Most penalty minutes	178	2015-16
Fewest penalty minutes	178	2015-16
Most shutouts	1	2015-16

=== Franchise single game ===
Most goals for	8	January 10, 2016 (final 8-1 vs NYR)
Most goals against	6	December 5, 2015 (final 7-6 vs BUF)
Biggest goal differential (win)	+7	January 10, 2016 (final 8-1 vs NYR)
Biggest goal differential (loss)	-1	4 times
Most shots for	66	February 21, 2016 (vs CTW)
Least shots for	35	February 6, 2016 (vs NYR)
Most shots against	35	October 11, 2015, and November 15, 2015
Least shots against	17	March 4, 2016 (vs NYR)
Most penalty minutes	20	February 6, 2016 (vs NYR)
Longest game	62:29	March 11, 2016 (vs BUF)

=== Streaks ===
Winning streaks
Overall	8	January 10, 2016 – March 4, 2016
Home	4	January 10, 2016 – March 4, 2016
Away	5	December 27, 2015 – February 28, 2016
Losing streaks
Overall	3	November 15, 2015 – November 29, 2015
Home	2	November 22, 2015 – November 29, 2015
Away	1	November 15, 2015
Winless streaks
Overall	3	November 15, 2015 – November 29, 2015 (3L)
Home	2	November 22, 2015 – November 29, 2015 (2L)
Away	1	November 15, 2015 (1L)

== Individual records ==
=== Career leaders ===
All-time leaders
Games	91	Jillian Dempsey
Games (defenseman)	73	Lexi Bender
Consecutive games	91	Jillian Dempsey
Points	98	Jillian Dempsey
Points (defenseman)	44	Gigi Marvin
Goals	46	Jillian Dempsey
Goals (defenseman)	19	Gigi Marvin
Assists	52	Jillian Dempsey
Assists (defenseman)	32	Kaleigh Fratkin
Penalty minutes	84	Kaleigh Fratkin
Goaltender games	52	Brittany Ott
Goaltender minutes	2361:21	Brittany Ott
Goaltender wins	25	Brittany Ott
Shutouts	5	Brittany Ott
Goals against average	1.94	Brittany Ott
Save percentage	.925	Brittany Ott
Coaching wins	34	Paul Mara

*Minimum of 60 minutes played for a goaltender

=== Single season leaders ===
All-time leaders
Points	33	Hilary Knight (2015-16)
Points (defenseman)	12	Kacey Bellamy and Gisele Marvin (2015-16)
Points (rookie)	0	
Goals	15	Hilary Knight (2015-16)
Goals (defenseman)	5	Gisele Marvin (2015-16)
Goals (rookie)	0	
Power play goals	3	Brianna Decker (2015-16)
Power play goals (defenseman)	2	Kacey Bellamy and Gisele Marvin (2015–16)
Shorthanded goals	3	Brianna Decker (2015-16)
Game winning goals	5	Hilary Knight (2015-16)
Overtime goals	0	
Hat tricks	2	Brianna Decker (2015-16)
Assists	18	Hilary Knight (2015-16)
Assists (defenseman)	12	Kacey Bellamy (2015-16)
Assists (rookie)	0	
Shots	128	Hilary Knight (2015-16)
Penalty minutes	20	Brianna Decker and Rachel Llanes (2015-16)
Goaltender games	17	Brittany Ott (2015-16)
Goaltender minutes	927	Brittany Ott (2015-16)
Goaltender wins	12	Brittany Ott (2015-16)
Shutouts	1	Brittany Ott (2015-16)
Goals against average	1.94	Brittany Ott (2015-16)
Save percentage	.925	Brittany Ott (2015-16)

*Minimum of 60 minutes played for a goaltender

=== Individual single game leaders ===
Player(s)
Points (single player)	4	4 times
Points (defenseman)	3	Blake Bolden
Points (rookie)	0	
Goals	3	Brianna Decker
Goals (defenseman)	1	4 times
Goals (rookie)	0	
Power play goals	2	Hilary Knight
Shorthanded goals	1	3 times
Assists	3	2 times
Assists (defenseman)	2	4 times
Assists (rookie)	0	
Shots (Game)	16	Hilary Knight
Penalty minutes	6	Blake Bolden
Goaltender shots faced (game)	35	Brittany Ott and Lauren Slebodnick
Goaltender saves	34	Brittany Ott

¹ NWHL record

== See also ==
- PHF awards
- List of Buffalo Beauts records
- List of Connecticut Whale (PHF) records
- List of Minnesota Whitecaps records
- List of PHF records (individual)
