= 2016–17 Boston Pride season =

2016–17 Boston Pride
- League: 1st NWHL
- 2016–17 record: 16–1–0
- Goals for: 73
- Goals against: 29

Team information
- General manager: Hayley Moore
- Coach: Bobby Jay
- Assistant coach: Dave Jensen, Lauren McAuliffe
- Arena: Warrior Ice Arena

The 2016–17 Boston Pride season was the second in franchise history.

== Offseason ==
During the offseason the Pride moved the Warrior Ice Arena which is also the home to the Boston Bruins from the Bright-Landry Hockey Center where they won the 2016 Isobel Championship. Newly acquired Alex Carpenter signed with the Boston Pride for a one-year, $19,500 contract, making her the highest paid player of the 2015 NWHL Draft class.

== Regular season ==
=== Game log ===
2016–17 Regular Season game log: 16–1–0, 32 points (Home: 9–0–0; Road: 7–1–0)

| # | Date | Time | Visitor | Score | Home | Location | Record | Points |
|---|---|---|---|---|---|---|---|---|
| 1 | Oct 7 | 7:30 PM | Boston Pride | 4–1 | Buffalo Beauts | HarborCenter | 1–0–0 | 2 |
| 2 | Oct 8 | 7:30 PM | New York Riveters | 3–6 | Boston Pride | Warrior Ice Arena | 2–0–0 | 4 |
| 3 | Oct 15 | 6:30 PM | Buffalo Beauts | 1–2 | Boston Pride | Warrior Ice Arena | 3–0–0 | 6 |
| 4 | Oct 22 | 6:30 PM | New York Riveters | 1–5 | Boston Pride | Warrior Ice Arena | 4–0–0 | 8 |
| 5 | Nov 12 | 6:30 PM | Connecticut Whale | 0–3 | Boston Pride | Warrior Ice Arena | 5–0–0 | 10 |
| 6 | Nov 20 | 3:30 PM | Boston Pride | 5–0 | Buffalo Beauts | HarborCenter | 6–0–0 | 12 |
| 7 | Dec 3 | 7:30 PM | Connecticut Whale | 2–5 | Boston Pride | Warrior Ice Arena | 7–0–0 | 14 |
| 8 | Dec 4 | 4:00 PM | Boston Pride | 3–2 (SO) | New York Riveters | Prudential Center Practice Facility | 8–0–0 | 16 |
| 9 | Jan 15 | 3:30 PM | Boston Pride | 4–0 | Connecticut Whale | Northford Ice Pavilion | 9–0–0 | 18 |
| 10 | Jan 21 | 6:00 PM | Boston Pride | 2–1 | New York Riveters | Prudential Center Practice Facility | 10–0–0 | 20 |
| 11 | Jan 27 | 7:30 PM | Boston Pride | 8–4 | Connecticut Whale | Northford Ice Pavilion | 11–0–0 | 22 |
| 12 | Feb 4 | 7:30 PM | Connecticut Whale | 2–5 | Boston Pride | Warrior Ice Arena | 12–0–0 | 24 |
| 13 | Feb 18 | 6:30 PM | Buffalo Beauts | 1–3 | Boston Pride | Warrior Ice Arena | 13–0–0 | 26 |
| 14 | Feb 24 | 7:30 PM | Boston Pride | 5–4 | Connecticut Whale | Northford Ice Pavilion | 14–0–0 | 28 |
| 15 | Mar 4 | 6:30 PM | New York Riveters | 3–4 | Boston Pride | Warrior Ice Arena | 15–0–0 | 30 |
| 16 | Mar 5 | 5:30 PM | Buffalo Beauts | 1–7 | Boston Pride | Warrior Ice Arena | 16–0–0 | 32 |
| 17 | Mar 12 | 4:00 PM | Boston Pride | 2–3 | New York Riveters | Prudential Center Practice Facility | 16–1–0 | 32 |

Win (2 points) Loss (0 points) Overtime/shootout loss (1 point)

== Playoffs ==
2016–17 Playoff game log (Record: 1–1–0)

| # | Date | Time | Visitor | Score | Home | Location |
|---|---|---|---|---|---|---|
| 1 | Mar 16 | 7:30 PM | Connecticut Whale | 2–8 | Boston Pride | Warrior Ice Arena |
| 2 | Mar 19 | 6:00 PM | Buffalo Beauts | 3–2 | Boston Pride | Tsongas Arena |

Win Loss

== Roster ==
Updated July 18, 2016

| No. | Nat | Player | Pos | S/G | Age | Acquired | Birthplace |
|---|---|---|---|---|---|---|---|
| 22 | (United States) | Kacey Bellamy | D | L | 29 | 2015 | Westfield, Massachusetts |
| 5 | (United States) | Lexi Bender | D | R | 23 | 2015 | Snohomish, Washington |
| 10 | (United States) | Blake Bolden | D | R | 26 | 2015 | Euclid, Ohio |
| 25 | (United States) | Alex Carpenter | F | L | 22 | 2016 | North Reading, Massachusetts |
| 14 | (United States) | Brianna Decker (C) | C | R | 25 | 2015 | Dousman, Wisconsin |
| 3 | (United States) | Jillian Dempsey | F | L | 26 | 2015 | Winthrop, Massachusetts |
| 10 | (United States) | Meghan Duggan | F | R | 29 | 2016 | Danvers, Massachusetts |
| 15 | (United States) | Emily Field | F | L | 23 | 2015 | Littleton, Massachusetts |
| 2 | (United States) | Alyssa Gagliardi | D | L | 24 | 2015 | Raleigh, North Carolina |
| 44 | (United States) | Zoe Hickel | RW | R | 24 | 2015 | Anchorage, Alaska |
| 21 | (United States) | Hilary Knight (C) | RW | R | 27 | 2015 | Palo Alto, California |
| 91 | (United States) | Rachel Llanes | F | R | 25 | 2015 | San Jose, California |
| 19 | (United States) | Gigi Marvin | D | R | 30 | 2015 | Warroad, Minnesota |
| 29 | (United States) | Brittany Ott | G | L | 26 | 2015 | St. Clair Shores, Michigan |
| 16 | (United States) | Amanda Pelkey | RW | R | 23 | 2015 | Montpelier, Vermont |
| 30 | (United States) | Lauren Slebodnick | G | L | 24 | 2015 | Manchester, New Hampshire |
| 11 | (United States) | Jordan Smelker | F | L | 24 | 2015 | Anchorage, Alaska |

== Transactions ==
=== Trades ===
| April 28, 2016 | To New York Riveters Miye D'Oench | To Boston Pride Alex Carpenter |

=== Free agents ===
| Player | Acquired from | Date | Contract terms |
|---|---|---|---|
| Lexi Bender | Boston College | May 2, 2016 | 1 year/$10,000 |

=== Signings ===
| Player | Date | Contract terms |
|---|---|---|
| Jordan Smelker | April 20, 2016 | 1 year/$14,000 |
| Jillian Dempsey | April 26, 2016 | 1 year/$13,000 |
| Alyssa Gagliardi | April 27, 2016 | 1 year/$14,000 |
| Lexi Bender | May 2, 2016 | 1 year/$10,000 |
| Blake Bolden | May 23, 2016 | 1 year/$14,000 |
| Brittany Ott | May 31, 2016 | 1 year/$18,000 |
| Lauren Slebodnick | July 19, 2016 | 1 year/$10,000 |
| Emily Field | July 29, 2016 | 1 year/$11,000 |
| Rachel Llanes | July 29, 2016 | 1 year/$12,000 |
| Zoe Hickel | July 31, 2016 | 1 year/$16,000 |
| Gigi Marvin | July 31, 2016 | 1 year/$20,000 |
| Amanda Pelkey | July 31, 2016 | 1 year/$17,000 |
| Hilary Knight | July 31, 2016 | 1 year/$20,000 |
| Brianna Decker | July 31, 2016 | 1 year/$20,000 |
| Meghan Duggan | July 31, 2016 | 1 year/$20,000 |
| Kacey Bellamy | July 31, 2016 | 1 year/$20,000 |
| Alex Carpenter | July 31, 2016 | 1 year/$19,000 |

== Draft ==
The following were the Pride selections in the 2016 NWHL Draft on June 18, 2016.

| # | Player | Pos | Nationality | College/Junior/Club team (League) |
|---|---|---|---|---|
| 4 | Ann Renee Desbiens | G | Canada | University of Wisconsin (WCHA) |
| 8 | Sarah Nurse | F | Canada | University of Wisconsin (WCHA) |
| 12 | Ashley Brykaliuk | F | Canada | University of Minnesota Duluth (WCHA) |
| 16 | Halli Krzyzaniak | D | Canada | University of North Dakota (ECAC) |
| 20 | Lara Stalder | F | Switzerland | University of Minnesota Duluth (WCHA) |
