= 2015–16 Boston Pride season =

2015–16 Boston Pride
- Isobel Cup champions
- League: 1st NWHL
- 2015–16 record: 14–3–1
- Home record: 6–2–1
- Road record: 8–1–0
- Goals for: 75
- Goals against: 39

Team information
- General manager: Hayley Moore
- Coach: Bobby Jay
- Captain: Brianna Decker; Hilary Knight
- Arena: Bright Hockey Center

Team leaders
- Goals: Hilary Knight (15)
- Assists: Hilary Knight (18)
- Points: Hilary Knight (33)
- Penalty minutes: Brianna Decker (20); Rachel Llanes
- Wins: Brittany Ott (13)
- Goals against average: Brittany Ott (1.94)

The 2015–16 Boston Pride season was the first in franchise history and participated in the National Women's Hockey League's inaugural season.

== Regular season ==
- October 11: Hilary Knight would score the first goal in Pride franchise history at the 12:08 mark of the first period. Said goal was scored against Buffalo Beauts goaltender Brianne McLaughlin. Knight would score again in the second period, becoming the first player in NWHL history to log a multi-goal game. Kacey Bellamy would earn two assists, becoming the first blueliner in NWHL history to log a multi-point game.
- December 27: With several members of the Boston Pride honoring commitments with the US national team over the 2015 holiday season, general manager Hayley Moore would suit up in a game as an emergency player as the Pride skated against the Connecticut Whale. Moore would participate in 1 faceoff in a 2–1 final for the Pride as the Whale endured their first loss in franchise history.

=== Standings ===
Pos	Team	GP	W	L	OTL	W%	GF	GA	GD	Pts
1	y – Boston Pride	18	14	3	1	0.806	75	39	+36	29
2	Connecticut Whale	18	13	5	0	0.722	61	51	+10	26
3	Buffalo Beauts	18	5	9	4	0.389	56	66	−10	14
4	New York Riveters	18	4	12	2	0.278	40	76	−36	10

Source: PHF
y – Clinched division

=== Game log ===
2015–16 Schedule

Game	Date	Opponent	Score	OT	Decision	Location	Record	Points	Gamesheet
1	Oct 11	@ Buffalo Beauts	4–1		Ott	HarborCenter	1–0–0	2	
2	Oct 18	@ New York Riveters	7–1		Ott	Aviator Sports and Events Center	2–0–0	4	
3	Oct 25	@ Buffalo Beauts	5–3		Ott	HarborCenter	3–0–0	6	
4	Nov 15	@ New York Riveters	2–3		Slebodnick	Aviator Sports and Events Center	3–1–0	6	
5	Nov 22	New York Riveters	2–3		Ott	Bright Hockey Center	3–2–0	6	
6	Nov 29	Connecticut Whale	3–4		Slebodnick	Bright Hockey Center	3–3–0	6	
7	Dec 5	Buffalo Beauts	7–6		Slebodnick	Bright Hockey Center	4–3–0	8	
8	Dec 6	New York Riveters	4–1		Ott	Bright Hockey Center	5–3–0	10	
9	Dec 20	Buffalo Beauts	1–0		Ott	Bright Hockey Center	6–3–0	12	
10	Dec 27	Connecticut Whale	2–1		Ott	Chelsea Piers	7–3–0	14	
11	Jan 3	Buffalo Beauts	3–4	OT	Ott	Bright Hockey Center	7–3–1	15	
12	Jan 10	New York Riveters	8–1		Ott	Bright Hockey Center	8–3–1	17	
13	Jan 17	Connecticut Whale	4–1		Ott	Bright Hockey Center	9–3–1	19	
14	Jan 31	Connecticut Whale	5–2		Ott	Chelsea Piers	10–3–1	21	
15	Feb 6	New York Riveters	6–1		Ott	Aviator Sports and Events Center	11–3–1	23	
16	Feb 14	Connecticut Whale	4–2		Ott	Bright Hockey Center	12–3–1	25	
17	Feb 21	Connecticut Whale	5–3		Ott	Chelsea Piers	13–3–1	27	
18	Feb 28	Buffalo Beauts	3–2		Ott	HarborCenter	14–3–1	29	

Win (2 points) Overtime/Shootout loss (1 point) Loss (0 points)

== Playoffs ==
=== Game log ===
2016 Isobel Cup Playoffs
Semifinals vs. New York Riveters; Boston won series 2–0

Game	Date	Opponent	Score	OT	Decision	Location	Record	Gamesheet
1	Mar 4	New York Riveters	6–0		Ott	Raymond Bourque Arena	1–0	
2	Mar 5	New York Riveters	7–4		Ott	Raymond Bourque Arena	2–0	

Finals vs. Buffalo Beauts; Boston won series 2–0

Game	Date	Opponent	Score	OT	Decision	Location	Record	Gamesheet
1	Mar 11	Buffalo Beauts	4–3	OT	Ott	Prudential Center Practice Facility	1–0	
2	Mar 12	Buffalo Beauts	3–1		Ott	Prudential Center Practice Facility	2–0	

Win Loss

== Statistics ==
Final

=== Skaters ===
Regular season
Player	GP	G	A	Pts	PIM
Hilary Knight	17	15	18	33	8
Brianna Decker	17	14	15	29	20
Jordan Smelker	17	9	10	19	8
Gigi Marvin	17	5	9	14	12
Jillian Dempsey	18	7	7	14	10
Kacey Bellamy	15	2	12	14	12
Amanda Pelkey	17	7	3	10	12
Blake Bolden	18	1	8	9	10
Corinne Buie	18	3	4	7	12
Emily Field	18	3	4	7	10
Rachel Llanes	17	3	4	7	20
Zoe Hickel	17	3	4	7	14
Alyssa Gagliardi	17	0	6	6	10
Marissa Gedman	18	0	6	6	16
Kelly Cooke	18	2	2	4	2
Meagan Mangene	13	0	1	1	0
Casey Pickett	11	0	0	0	2
Cherie Hendrickson	9	0	0	0	0
Denna Laing	7	0	0	0	0
Hayley Moore	3	0	0	0	0

Playoffs
Player	GP	G	A	Pts	PIM
Brianna Decker	4	5	4	9	6
Hilary Knight	4	7	2	9	0
Gigi Marvin	4	2	5	7	2
Jillian Dempsey	4	2	3	5	4
Amanda Pelkey	4	1	3	4	2
Kacey Bellamy	4	0	4	4	4
Zoe Hickel	4	1	3	4	4
Blake Bolden	4	2	1	3	2
Jordan Smelker	4	0	2	2	2
Marissa Gedman	4	0	2	2	12
Alyssa Gagliardi	4	0	0	0	0
Corinne Buie	4	0	0	0	0
Emily Field	4	0	0	0	2
Kelly Cooke	4	0	0	0	0
Rachel Llanes	4	0	0	0	0

=== Goaltenders ===
Regular season
Player	GP	TOI	W	L	OT	GA	GAA	SA	SV%	SO	PIM
Brittany Ott	17	926:35	13	1	1	30	1.94	400	0.925	1	0
Lauren Slebodnick	4	163:35	1	2	0	9	3.30	77	0.883	0	0
Kelsie Fralick	1	8:28	0	0	0	0	0.00	3	1.000	0	0

Playoffs
Player	GP	TOI	W	L	OT	GA	GAA	SA	SV%	SO	PIM
Brittany Ott	4	260:00	4	0	0	8	1.85	94	0.915	1	0

== Roster ==
No.	Nat	Player	Pos	S/G	Age	Acquired	Birthplace
22	(United States)	Kacey Bellamy	D	L	28	2015	Westfield, Massachusetts
10	(United States)	Blake Bolden	D	R	24	2015	Euclid, Ohio
23	(United States)	Corinne Buie	F	R	23	2015	Edina, Minnesota
5	(United States)	Kelly Cooke	F	L	25	2015	Andover, Massachusetts
14	(United States)	Brianna Decker (C)	C	R	24	2015	Dousman, Wisconsin
3	(United States)	Jillian Dempsey	F	L	25	2015	Winthrop, Massachusetts
15	(United States)	Emily Field	F	L	22	2015	Littleton, Massachusetts
1	(United States)	Kelsie Fralick	G		23	2015	West Chester, Pennsylvania
2	(United States)	Alyssa Gagliardi	D	L	23	2015	Raleigh, North Carolina
12	(United States)	Marissa Gedman	D	L	23	2015	Framingham, Massachusetts
44	(United States)	Zoe Hickel	RW	R	23	2015	Anchorage, Alaska
21	(United States)	Hilary Knight (C)	RW	R	26	2015	Palo Alto, California
24	(United States)	Denna Laing	F	R	24	2015	Marblehead, Massachusetts
91	(United States)	Rachel Llanes	F	R	24	2015	San Jose, California
19	(United States)	Gigi Marvin	D	R	28	2015	Warroad, Minnesota
29	(United States)	Brittany Ott	G	L	25	2015	St. Clair Shores, Michigan
16	(United States)	Amanda Pelkey	RW	R	22	2015	Montpelier, Vermont
30	(United States)	Lauren Slebodnick	G	L	23	2015	Manchester, New Hampshire
11	(United States)	Jordan Smelker	F	L	23	2015	Anchorage, Alaska

== Awards and honors ==
NWHL Player of the Week

- Zoe Hickel – October 18, 2015
- Brianna Decker – October 25, 2015
- Jillian Dempsey – December 8, 2015
- Hilary Knight – December 22, 2015
- Jordan Smelker – February 14, 2016
- Brianna Decker – February 21, 2016
- Brittany Ott – February 28, 2016

NWHL 1st All-Star Game selection

- Kacey Bellamy (Team Knight)
- Blake Bolden (Team Pfalzer)
- Brianna Decker (Team Pfalzer)
- Emily Field (Team Pfalzer)
- Alyssa Gagliardi (Team Knight)
- Zoe Hickel (Team Pfalzer)
- Hilary Knight (Team Knight)
- Gigi Marvin (Team Pfalzer)
- Brittany Ott (Team Pfalzer)
- Amanda Pelkey (Team Knight)
- Jordan Smelker (Team Knight)

Regular season awards

- Hilary Knight – Leading Scorer
- Denna Laing – NWHL Foundation Award (Awarded to the player most actively applying the core values of hockey to her community as well as growing and improving hockey culture.)
- Gigi Marvin – NWHL Best Defenseman
- Brittany Ott – NWHL Best Goaltender
- Denna Laing – Perseverance Award (Awarded to the player who most exemplifies the qualities of perseverance, sportsmanship, and dedication to her sport.)
- Brianna Decker – NWHL MVP

== Transactions ==
=== Signings ===
Player	Date	Contract terms
Amanda Pelkey	June 23, 2015	$13,500
Blake Bolden	July 2, 2015	$15,000
Jillian Dempsey	July 2, 2015	$10,500
Alyssa Gagliardi	July 2, 2015	$16,000
Emily Field	July 6, 2015	$13,500
Jordan Smelker	July 6, 2015	$16.000
Brittany Ott	July 10, 2015	$17,000
Kelly Cooke	July 24, 2015	$10,500
Marissa Gedman	July 24, 2015	$10,000
Corinne Buie	July 31, 2015	$12,000
Lauren Slebodnick	August 3, 2015	$12,500
Rachel Llanes	August 11, 2015	$10,500
Kelsie Fralick	August 17, 2015	$10,000
Zoe Hickel	August 18, 2015	$16,000
Kacey Bellamy	September 22, 2015	$22,000
Brianna Decker	September 23, 2015	$22,000
Gigi Marvin	September 23, 2015	$20,000
Hilary Knight	September 25, 2015	$22,000

== Draft ==
The following were the Pride selections in the 2015 NWHL Draft on June 20, 2015.

Round	#	Player	Pos	Nationality	College/Junior/Club team (League)
1	3	Kendall Coyne	F	United States	Northeastern (Hockey East)
2	7	Emerance Maschmeyer	G	Canada	Harvard University (ECAC)
3	11	Lexi Bender	D	United States	Boston College (HEA)
4	15	Miye D'Oench	F	United States	Harvard (ECAC)
5	19	Shannon MacAulay	F	Canada	Clarkson University (ECAC)
