= 2013–14 CWHL season =

The 2013–14 CWHL season was the seventh in league history. The Montreal Stars finished as regular season champions while the top four leading scorers in the regular season are all Stars players (Ann-Sophie Bettez, Sarah Vaillancourt, Vanessa Davidson and Cathy Chartrand). The Toronto Furies won the 2014 Clarkson Cup, making them the first team to finish in fourth place during the regular season to claim the Cup. The Calgary Inferno also qualified for their first-ever postseason berth while goaltender DeLayne Brian became the first Inferno goaltender with a winning record in the regular season.

== Offseason ==
=== CWHL Draft ===
- Please see 2013 CWHL Draft

For the second straight season, the Calgary Inferno had the first pick overall. Jessica Wong was selected with the pick by the Calgary Inferno, making her the first visible minority selected first overall in league history. During the first round, Blake Bolden was selected by the Boston Blades, making her the first African-American player to be selected in the round.

== Regular season ==
- Cathy Chartrand was appointed as the second captain in Montreal Stars franchise history. She was selected by former captain and team co-founder Lisa-Marie Breton.
- Meghan Corley-Byrne earned a shutout in her CWHL debut with the Montreal Stars. In the same contest, Emilie Bocchia logged her first career CWHL goal.
- March 15, 2014: The Montreal Stars hosted their annual fund raiser for breast cancer.

=== Milestones ===
- Two Toronto Furies players become the fourth and fifth women to play 150 career games in the league. On November 16, 2013, Kristy Zamora reached the milestone. On November 23, 2013, a 4-2 victory over Brampton provided Meagan Aarts with her 150th game.
- January 11: CWHL co-founder Lisa-Marie Breton registered the 100th point of her career.
- February 2: Danielle Stone broke two scoring records in Calgary Inferno franchise history. She began by topping Samantha Hunt's franchise mark for most points in one season. The previous record was 14 and she would surpass it with her 15 points in a 2-1 shootout win against the Montreal Stars. In the same game, she also set a new record for most points in one season by an Inferno rookie.
- In that same game, Jessica Wong logged a goal, providing her with seven points in the first five games of her CWHL career, a new franchise record for the Inferno.
- February 8: Vanessa Davidson earned the 100th point of her CWHL career.
- February 9: A victory against the defending Clarkson Cup champion Boston Blades provided Furies goaltender Sami Jo Small with 60 victories of her career. She became the first CWHL goaltender to reach the 60 wins plateau.
- March 8: In a contest against the Boston Blades, Emmanuelle Blais logged the 100th point in her CWHL career. She was the third Montreal Stars player to reach the milestone during the season. It marked the first time in CWHL history that three players from the same franchise reached the century mark in the same season.
- March 8: Meagan Aarts of the Toronto Furies earned the 100th point of her CWHL career during a victory against the Brampton Thunder.
- In the second last game of the Boston Blades' regular season, Jessica Koizumi logged her 50th career point with the Blades. This made her the first player to register 50 points with the Blades franchise.

== Awards and honors ==
The 2014 CWHL Awards Gala was held in Markham, Ontario That night, the league formally recognized the CWHL regular-season champions, the Angela James Bowl winner, the Most Valuable Player, the Goaltender of the Year, the Rookie of the Year, the Coach of the Year, the Defenceman of the Year, and the Humanitarian Award winner. The all-star teams (as voted by the five head coaches) and annual all-rookie team were announced after the season.

- Ann-Sophie Bettez, Montreal Stars: Angela James Bowl winner (awarded to CWHL scoring champion)
- Ann-Sophie Bettez, CWHL MVP Award
- Cathy Chartrand, Montreal Stars: CWHL Defensive Player of the Year
- Cathy Chartrand, Leading scorer among CWHL Defenders
- Jillian Dempsey, Boston Blades: CWHL Rookie of the Year
- Jillian Dempsey, Leading scorer among CWHL rookies
- Delayne Brian, Calgary Inferno: CWHL Goaltender of the Year
- Sommer West, Toronto Furies: CWHL Coach of the Year
- Cassie Campbell, CWHL Humanitarian of the Year Award (The award was presented to Campbell by Canadian Prime Minister Stephen Harper)

=== CWHL All-Stars ===
First Team All-Stars

- Goaltender: Christina Kessler, Toronto
- Defender: Blake Bolden, Boston
- Defender: Cathy Chartrand, Montreal
- Forward: Ann-Sophie Bettez, Montreal
- Forward: Danielle Stone, Calgary
- Forward: Jillian Dempsey, Boston

Second Team All-Stars

- Goaltender: Brittany Ott, Boston
- Defender: Jessica Wong, Calgary
- Defender: Danielle Skirrow, Brampton
- Forward: Jenna Cunningham, Calgary
- Forward: Carolyne Prevost, Toronto
- Forward: Alyssa Baldin, Toronto

=== CWHL All-Rookie Team ===
- Goaltender: Delayne Brian, Calgary
- Defender: Blake Bolden, Boston
- Defender: Jessica Wong, Calgary
- Forward: Jillian Dempsey, Boston
- Forward: Alyssa Baldin, Toronto
- Forward: Jill Cardella, Boston

=== CWHL Monthly Top Scorer ===
- November: Jill Cardella, Boston
- December: Sarah Vaillancourt, Montreal
- January: Ann-Sophie Bettez, Montreal
- February: Ann-Sophie Bettez, Montreal
- March: Julie Paetsch, Calgary
