= 1st NWHL All-Star Game =

	1	2	3	Total
Team Knight	0	1	x	1
Team Pfalzer	6	3	x	9
- Date: January 24, 2016
- Arena: HarborCenter
- City: Buffalo, New York, United States
- MVP: Kelley Steadman

The 1st NWHL All-Star Game took place on January 24, 2016, at HarborCenter in Buffalo, New York. The event featured two 20-minute periods in a 4-on-4 format and a Skills Competition. Team Pfalzer entered the game with a 4-0 lead having won all events in the Skills Competition.

This edition of the All-Star Game featured a "fantasy draft" format in order to determine the rosters. The team captains were Hilary Knight from the Boston Pride, and forward Emily Pfalzer, also a team captain with the Buffalo Beauts. Team Knight had the first pick overall and selected Kacey Bellamy. The captains each chose 11 players for their team.

== Draft ==
Each captain had to select at least one player from all four teams in the NWHL. In addition, each captain had to select two goalies among their 11 selections. Two available spots on each team were determined by fan balloting, which took place from December 11–14, 2015, with winning players announced on December 15.

Team Knight
Pick No.	Nat.	Player	Team	Pos.
1	(United States)	Kacey Bellamy	Boston Pride	Defense
3	(United States)	Kelli Stack	Connecticut Whale	Forward
5	(Canada)	Kaleigh Fratkin	Connecticut Whale	Forward
7	(Austria)	Janine Weber	New York Riveters	Forward
9	(Canada)	Jaimie Leonoff	Connecticut Whale	Goaltender
11	(United States)	Alyssa Gagliardi	Boston Pride	Defense
13	(United States)	Jordan Smelker	Boston Pride	Forward
15	(United States)	Brianne McLaughlin	Buffalo Beauts	Goaltender
17	(Canada)	Shelby Bram	Buffalo Beauts	Forward
19	(United States)	Amanda Pelkey	Boston Pride	Forward
21	(United States)	Jordan Brickner	Connecticut Whale	Defense

Team Pfalzer
Pick No.	Nat.	Player	Team	Pos.
2	(United States)	Brianna Decker	Boston Pride	Forward
4	(United States)	Meghan Duggan	Buffalo Beauts	Forward
6	(United States)	Kelley Steadman	Buffalo Beauts	Forward
8	(Japan)	Nana Fujimoto	New York Riveters	Goaltender
10	(United States)	Megan Bozek	Buffalo Beauts	Defense
12	(United States)	Gigi Marvin	Boston Pride	Defence
14	(United States)	Blake Bolden	Boston Pride	Defense
16	(United States)	Brittany Ott	Boston Pride	Goaltender
18	(United States)	Shiann Darkangelo	Connecticut Whale	Defense
20	(United States)	Emily Field	Boston Pride	Defense
22	(United States)	Zoe Hickel	Boston Pride	Defense

=== Fan voting ===
Over 62,000 votes were cast in order to select four more players to add to the All-Star Game rosters. Madison Packer and Hayley Williams were assigned to Team Knight, while Morgan Fritz-Ward and Devon Skeats suited up with Team Pfalzer.

Player	Nationality	Team	# of votes
Madison Packer	United States	New York Riveters	13,397
Morgan Fritz-Ward	United States	New York Riveters	6,948
Hayley Williams	United States	Buffalo Beauts	6,384
Devon Skeats	Canada	Buffalo Beauts	4,726

== Game summary ==
The starting goaltenders in the contest were Nana Fujimoto for Team Pfalzer and Jaimie Leonoff for Team Knight.

Kelley Steadman would score the first goal in All-Star Game history, providing Team Pfalzer with the lead. Earning the assists on Steadman's historic goal was Meghan Duggan. Adding to Team Pfalzer's lead was Emily Field, who would also score on Leonoff in the first.

In the second period, Brianne McLaughlin would replace Leonoff for Team Knight, while Brittany Ott stood between the pipes for Team Pfalzer. Along with Blake Bolden, Field and Kaleigh Fratkin, Ott would become one of four women to have competed in the 2015 Women's Winter Classic and the inaugural NWHL All-Star Game.

Steadman would score on McLaughlin, generating the first multi-goal performance in All-Star Game history. Other Team Pfalzer skaters that would score included Shiann Darkangelo and Devon Skeats, who became the first Canadian to score a goal in the NWHL All-Star Game. During the second, Hayley Williams would score the only goal of the game for Team Knight.

=== Skills competition ===
Held prior to the game itself, there were four different skills events. Whichever team would prevail in each event would gain one point that would count towards the All-Star Game's final score. Of note, Team Pfalzer captured the win in all four events at the Skills Competition, gaining four points. In the hardest shot competition, Megan Bozek was the winner, with a shot of 88 mph.
