= 2013 Clarkson Cup =

2013 ice hockey championship series

	1	Total
Boston Blades	5	5
Montreal Stars	2	2
- Location(s): Markham, Ontario
- Dates: March 23, 2013
- Hall of Famers: Stars: Caroline Ouellette (2023); Kim St-Pierre (2020)

The 2013 Clarkson Cup is a women's ice hockey tournament that was contested in Markham, Ontario to determine the champion of the Canadian Women's Hockey League from March 20 to March 23, 2013. The Boston Blades defeated the Montreal Stars by a 5-2 tally to claim their first title in team history. The tournament was played at Markham Centennial Centre.

== Promotion ==
- On March 7, 2013, the Clarkson Cup was given a permanent home in the Hockey Hall of Fame.

== Round robin ==
- On March 22, the Toronto Furies and Brampton Thunder competed in the final game of the round robin. Rebecca Johnston scored the game-winning goal on an assist from Natalie Spooner with one second remaining in overtime.

Date	Away	Home	Score
March 20	Toronto	Boston	Boston, 3-2
March 20	Montreal	Brampton	Montreal, 5-0
March 21	Brampton	Boston	Boston, 2-0
March 21	Toronto	Montreal	Montreal, 2-0
March 22	Montreal	Boston	Montreal, 1-0 (OT)
March 22	Toronto	Brampton	Toronto, 4-3 (OT)

=== Standings ===
Team	W	L	OTL	GF	GA
Montreal	3	0	0	8	0
Boston	2	0	1	5	3
Toronto	1	2	0	6	8
Brampton	0	2	1	3	11

== Blades championship roster ==
Number	Name	Nationality
8	Caitlin Cahow C	United States
10	Lindsay Berman	United States
11	Whitney Naslund	United States
15	Anne Schleper	United States
16	Katka Mrazova	Czech Republic
17	Meghan Duggan A	United States
19	Gigi Marvin	United States
20	Kate Buesser	United States
22	Kacey Bellamy	United States
23	Jen Schoullis	United States
24	Cherie Hendrickson	United States
25	Kelley Steadman	United States
27	Hilary Knight	United States
30	Molly Schaus	United States
33	Genevieve Lacasse	Canada
56	Jessica Koizumi	United States

== Awards and honours ==
- Most Valuable Player, Catherine Ward, Montreal Stars
- First Star of the Game, Kelley Steadman, Boston Blades
- Second Star of the Game, Caroline Ouellette, Montreal Stars
- Third Star of the Game, Genevieve Lacasse, Boston Blades

=== Clarkson Cup All-Star Team ===
- Goaltender, Genevieve Lacasse, Boston Blades
- Defense, Catherine Ward, Montreal Stars
- Defense, Gigi Marvin, Boston Blades
- Forward, Kate Buesser, Boston Blades
- Forward, Haley Irwin, Montreal Stars
- Forward, Sarah Vaillancourt, Montreal Stars
