= 2019 Clarkson Cup =

2019 ice hockey championship series

	1	Total
Calgary Inferno	5	5
Canadiennes de Montreal	2	2
- Location(s): Toronto, Ontario
- Dates: March 24, 2019

The 2019 Clarkson Cup was held at Ricoh Coliseum in Toronto on 24 March 2019 with the Calgary Inferno defeating the Canadiennes de Montreal by a score of 5-2. Brianna Decker scored the game-winning goal during a power play opportunity in the second period, with Kacey Bellamy logging the assist. Inferno forward Zoe Hickel was recognized as the First Star of the Game.

== Game summary ==
Scoring summary
Team	Goal	Assist(s)	Time	Score
1st period: Emerance Maschmeyer (Montreal) vs. Alex Rigsby (Calgary)
Inferno	Zoe Hickel (1)	Katelyn Gosling, Kacey Bellamy	7:59	1-0, Inferno
Inferno	Halli Krzyzaniak (1)	Blayre Turnbull	12:59	2-0, Inferno
2nd period: Maschmeyer (Montreal) vs. Rigsby (Calgary)
Canadiennes	Ann-Sophie Bettez (1)	Sarah Lefort	3 :43	2-1, Inferno
Inferno	Brianna Decker (1), PP	Bellamy (2)	12 :42	3-1, Inferno
Canadiennes	Bettez (2)	Hilary Knight, Erin Ambrose	17 :37	3-2, Inferno
3rd period: Maschmeyer (Montreal) vs. Rigsby (Calgary)

== Playoff seeding ==
Clarkson Cup semifinals Best-of-three
1	Calgary Inferno	x
4	Toronto Furies	x
2	Canadiennes de Montreal	2
x	Markham Thunder	x

Clarkson Cup Championship
1	Calgary Inferno	5
2	Canadiennes de Montreal	2

== Awards and honors ==
- Playoff MVP: Brianna Decker
- First Star of the Game: Zoe Hickel
- Second Star of the Game: Ann-Sophie Bettez
- Third Star of the Game: Kacey Bellamy

== Calgary Inferno – 2019 Clarkson Cup champions ==
With the victory, Alex Rigsby became the first American-born goaltender to win an Olympic Gold Medal (2018), IIHF World Championship (2017), and a Clarkson Cup championship. Venla Hovi becomes the first player from Finland to win the Clarkson Cup, while Aina Mizukami is the third player from Japan to have won. As a side note, the first two Japanese players to have won, Kanae Aoki and Aina Takeuchi were part of Calgary's first Clarkson Cup win, back in 2016.

Defenders

- 3 Tori Hickel United States
- 4 Brigette Lacquette Canada
- 5 Kelly Murray Canada
- 18 Aina Mizukami Japan
- 21 Halli Krzyzaniak Canada
- 22 Kacey Bellamy United States
- 51 Katelyn Gosling Canada

Forwards

- 2 Laura Dostaler Canada
- 6 Rebecca Johnston Canada
- 7 Venla Hovi Finland
- 8 Erica Kromm Canada
- 9 Dakota Woodworth Canada
- 10 Rhianna Kurio Canada
- 11 Eden Murray Canada
- 13 Kelty Apperson Canada
- 14 Brianna Decker United States
- 16 Rebecca Leslie Canada
- 17 Kaitlin Willoughby Canada
- 19 Brianne Jenner Canada
- 28 Louise Warren Canada
- 40 Blayre Turnbull Canada
- 44 Zoe Hickel United States

Goaltenders

- 1 Alex Rigsby United States
- 33 Lindsey Post Canada
- 41 Annie Belanger Canada

Coaching and Administrative Staff

- Ryan Hilderman (Head coach)
- Becky McGee, Assistant coach
- Krister Toews, Assistant coach
- Mandi Duhamel, Assistant Coach
- Brodie Lefaivre, Trainer
- Charley Hasselaar, Trainer
- Kurtis Smith, Equipment Manager
- Kirsten Haag, General Manager
