= Hayley Moore =

American ice hockey executive and former player

- Born: August 4, 1986 (age 40) Wakefield, Massachusetts, U.S.
- Height: 5 ft 7 in (170 cm)
- Position: Forward
- Shot: Right
- Played for: Boston Pride; Boston Blades; Brown Bears
- Playing career: 2004–2016

Hayley Marie Moore (born August 4, 1986) is an American ice hockey executive and former player, currently the vice president of hockey operations of the American Hockey League (AHL). She previously served as the deputy commissioner of the National Women's Hockey League (NWHL) from 2017 to 2019, general manager of the Boston Pride of the NWHL from 2015 to 2017, and president of the Boston Pride from 2019 to 2021.

== Playing career ==
=== NCAA ===
From 2004 to 2008, Moore competed with the Brown Bears women's ice hockey program. Playing for head coach Digit Murphy, Moore accumulated 133 points on the strength of 69 goals. In her junior and senior seasons, Moore served as captain for the Bears, graduating among the program's top ten all-time leading scorers.

=== Canadian Women's Hockey League ===
Moore was a member of the Boston Blades during their inaugural season in the Canadian Women's Hockey League (CWHL). Competing during the 2010–11 CWHL season, Moore ranked seventh on the Blades in team scoring.

Moore made her debut with the Blades in an October 30, 2010, match against the Burlington Barracudas. The following day, she scored her first career CWHL goal, also against the Barracudas. By season's end, she registered nine goals and five assists for a 14-point total.

=== Premier Hockey Federation ===
With several members of the Boston Pride honoring commitments with the US national team over the 2015 holiday season, Moore dressed for a game as an emergency player while she was the general manager of the team. The game took place on December 27, 2015, as the Pride played against the Connecticut Whale. Moore participated in one faceoff in the 2–1 win for the Pride as the Whale endured their first loss in franchise history.

== Coaching ==
With the University of Massachusetts Boston, she served as a volunteer coach for their 2009–10 season. During that season, the UMass Boston Beacons managed a 17–10 won-loss mark.

In the autumn of 2012, Moore joined the Harvard Crimson women's ice hockey program, serving as an assistant coach. Her first season with Harvard saw the program claim an Ivy League title along with a spot in the 2013 NCAA tournament.

== Sports executive ==
In August 2011, Moore served as the assistant athletic director, while taking on head coaching duties with St. Mark's School. She would also take on a position as the director of girls'/women's hockey for the East Coast Wizards.

In 2015, Moore became the first general manager of the Boston Pride in the inaugural season of the Premier Hockey Federation (PHF, formerly NWHL). During the 2015 NWHL Draft, the first player she selected was Northeastern's Kendall Coyne. Following the 2015–16 NWHL season, the Pride finished first overall in the league standings and won Isobel Cup playoffs. She remained general manager of the Pride in 2016–17 when the team took first in regular season but lost the Isobel Cup to the Buffalo Beauts. After the season, she was hired as the deputy commissioner of the league for the 2017–18 season, but remained with the Pride as team president.

In January 2021, Moore was named the vice president of hockey operations in American Hockey League (AHL), the second highest men's league in North America after the National Hockey League.

== Awards and honors ==
- ECAC All-Academic Team
- 2005 ECAC All-Rookie Team
- 2006 ECAC All-First Team
- 2007 All-Ivy Honorable Mention

== Statistics ==
=== NCAA ===
Season	Team	League	GP	G	A	PTS	PPG	SHG	GWG
2004–05	Brown Bears	NCAA	32	11	15	26	3	0	1
2005–06	Brown Bears	NCAA	33	25	18	43	2	3	5
2006–07	Brown Bears	NCAA	29	20	16	36	8	1	3
2007–08	Brown Bears	NCAA	29	13	15	28	5	0	1
NCAA Totals			123	69	64	133	18	4	10

Statistics source

=== Professional ===
Season	Team	League	GP	G	A	PTS	+/-	PIM	GWG
2010–11	Boston Blades	CWHL	26	9	5	14	+8	6	2
2015–16	Boston Pride	NWHL	2	0	0	0	0	0	0
Totals			28	9	5	14	+8	6	2

Statistics source
