= Jess Koizumi =

American ice hockey coach and player

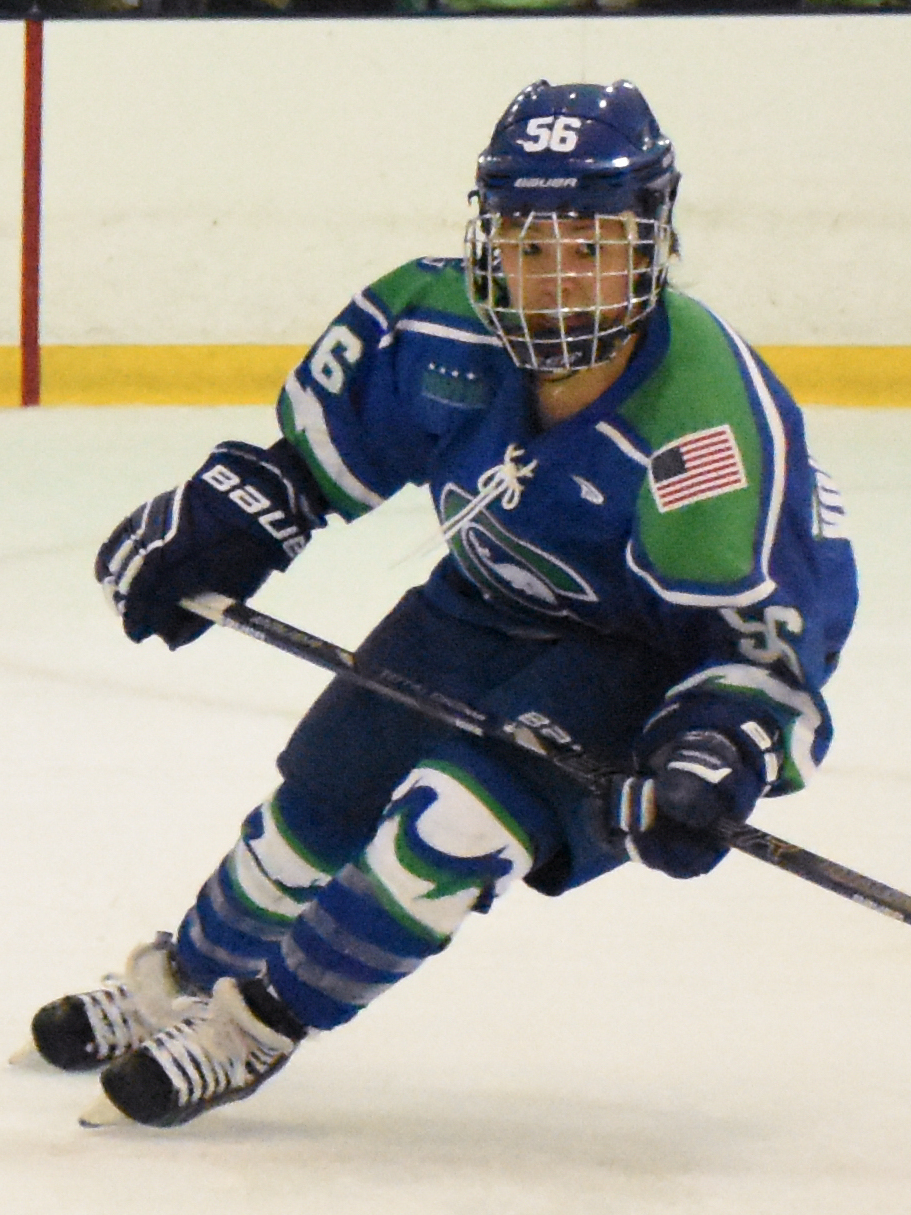
- Koizumi with the Connecticut Whale in 2015
- Born: April 15, 1985 (age 41); Honolulu, Hawaii, U.S.
- Coaching career

Biographical details
- Education: University of Minnesota Duluth

Coaching career (HC unless noted)
- 2010–2016: Yale Bulldogs (assistant coach)
- 2016–2017: Ohio State Buckeyes (assoc. HC)
- 2017–2023: Vermont Catamounts (assoc. HC)
Ice hockey career
- Height: 5 ft 4 in (163 cm)
- Weight: 136 lb (62 kg; 9 st 10 lb)
- Position: Forward
- Shot: Left
- Played for: Connecticut Whale; Boston Blades; Montreal Stars; Minnesota Whitecaps; Minnesota Duluth Bulldogs
- National team: United States
- Playing career: 2003–2016
Medal record
Representing United States
Women's ice hockey
IIHF World Championship
Gold medal – first place	2008 China
Women's inline hockey
FIRS World Championship
Gold medal – first place	2007 Spain
Gold medal – first place	2006 United States
Silver medal – second place	2005 France

Jessica "Jess" Koizumi (COY-Zoo-Mee) (born April 15, 1985) is an American ice hockey coach and player, currently serving as the associate head coach of the Vermont Catamounts women's ice hockey program. She won a gold medal as a member of the United States national women's ice hockey team at the 2008 IIHF Women's World Championship. During her playing career, Koizumi played with the Minnesota Whitecaps of the Western Women's Hockey League (WWHL), the Montreal Stars and the Boston Blades of the Canadian Women's Hockey League (CWHL), and the Connecticut Whale of the Premier Hockey Federation (PHF). She scored the first goal in PHF history in the league’s inaugural game, which featured the Whale facing off against the New York Riveters.

== Playing career ==
=== NCAA ===
Prior to joining the Minnesota Duluth Bulldogs, she participated for Cal Selects Hockey Club from 1999–2003, and was recognized as the Cal Selects Player of the Year for 2002–03. Koizumi competed for the Minnesota-Duluth Bulldogs and finished her career ranked seventh all-time on the Bulldogs scoring list. She accumulated 155 points (84 goals, 71 assists). In 2006–07, she led the Bulldogs with six game-winning goals. Koizumi was a two sport star and was also a member of the Bulldogs' softball program.

In her senior season (2006–07), Koizumi was the Bulldogs captain. During the semifinal match of the 2007 NCAA Women's Frozen Four, Koizumi registered two goals (including the game-winner) and an assist as the Bulldogs bested Boston College in double-overtime. The final game of her NCAA career was the championship game of the Frozen Four tournament.

=== USA Hockey ===
Koizumi has attended the USA Hockey Women's National Festival from 2004 to 2007. In September 2007, Koizumi was selected to be part of the American contingent competing in the 2007 Four Nations Cup, held in Leksand, Sweden. From 2004 to 2006, Koizumi was a member of the United States U-22. In addition, she claimed a gold medal at the roller hockey world championships in July, 2006. At the 2008 IIHF World Women's Championship, Koizumi was part of the gold medal winning roster.

She has also represented Team USA at three Women's World InLine Hockey Championships, from 2005 to 2007 respectively. That included a gold medal in Detroit in 2006 and a silver medal in France in 2005.

In addition to her gold medal at the 2008 IIHF Women's World Championship in China, Koizumi also was part of the U.S. team's second-place finish at the 2007 Four Nations Cup. She was on the U.S. Women's Select Team in 2008–09 while getting her master's degree in education from Minnesota-Duluth. She also played for the U.S. Under-22 Select Team in the series with Canada in 2004 and 2006.

=== CWHL ===
Koizumi played in the CWHL with the Montreal Stars and the Boston Blades. In 2010, the Stars reached the 2010 Clarkson Cup semi-finals. The following year, Koizumi was part of the 2010–11 Boston Blades season. She helped the Blades win the Clarkson Cup in 2013 and 2015. In the second last game of the Boston Blades regular season in 2013–14, Koizumi logged her 50th career point with the Blades. Of note, this makes her the first player to register 50 points with the Blades franchise.

=== NWHL ===
On July 9, 2015, Koizumi signed with the Connecticut Whale of the PHF. Competing with the Whale in the NWHL's first game on October 11, 2015, she would score the first goal in franchise history and the first goal in league history. On November 14, 2015, Koizumi was named the captain of the Connecticut Whale, with Kaleigh Fratkin as the assistant captain.

On September 12, 2016, Koizumi announced her retirement from playing and accepted an assistant coaching position with the Ohio State Buckeyes women's ice hockey program.

== Coaching career ==
After graduation, Koizumi joined the Bulldogs coaching staff. On September 27, 2010, Koizumi was hired as an assistant for the Yale Bulldogs women's ice hockey program. She worked under Joakim Flygh, who was an assistant at Minnesota Duluth while Koizumi played there, until 2016. After a one-year stop at Ohio State, Koizumi became the associate head coach of the Vermont Catamounts.

In addition, Koizumi has also served as a head coach at multiple USA Hockey National Girls’ Hockey festivals, working with the U14 team in Rochester, in 2010; the U16 team in St. Cloud, Minnesota, in 2009 and 2010; and the U17 team in Lake Placid, in 2007. She also served as an evaluator at USA Hockey's Pacific District tryouts in Seattle, from 2007 through 2009.

== Playing career statistics ==
=== NCAA ===
Year	GP	G	A	Pts	PPG	SHG	GWG
2003–04	30	21	10	31	5	0	4
2004–05	32	24	17	41	8	0	4
2005–06	34	17	26	43	5	0	2
2006–07	36	22	18	40	10	0	6
Career	132	84	71	155	28		16

=== USA Hockey ===
Year	GP	G	A	Pts	PPG	SHG	GWG
2004 Under 22 series	3	0	0	0	0	0	0
2006 Under 22 series	3	1	0	1	0	0	0
Total	6	1		1			

== Awards and honors ==
- 2002–03 Cal Selects Player of the Year
- 2003–04 WCHA All-Rookie Team
- 2006–07 All-WCHA Third Team selection
- 2007 Frozen Four All-Tournament Team

== Personal ==
Koizumi was born in Honolulu, Hawaii but was raised in Simi Valley, California.

She earned a bachelor's degree in psychology with a minor in coaching from the University of Minnesota Duluth in 2007 and, as a recipient of the NCAA Postgraduate Scholarship, completed a master's in education in 2009.

Koizumi is known by the nicknames 'Zumi', 'Tsunami', and 'Cali.'
