= Amanda Pelkey =

American ice hockey player (born 1993)

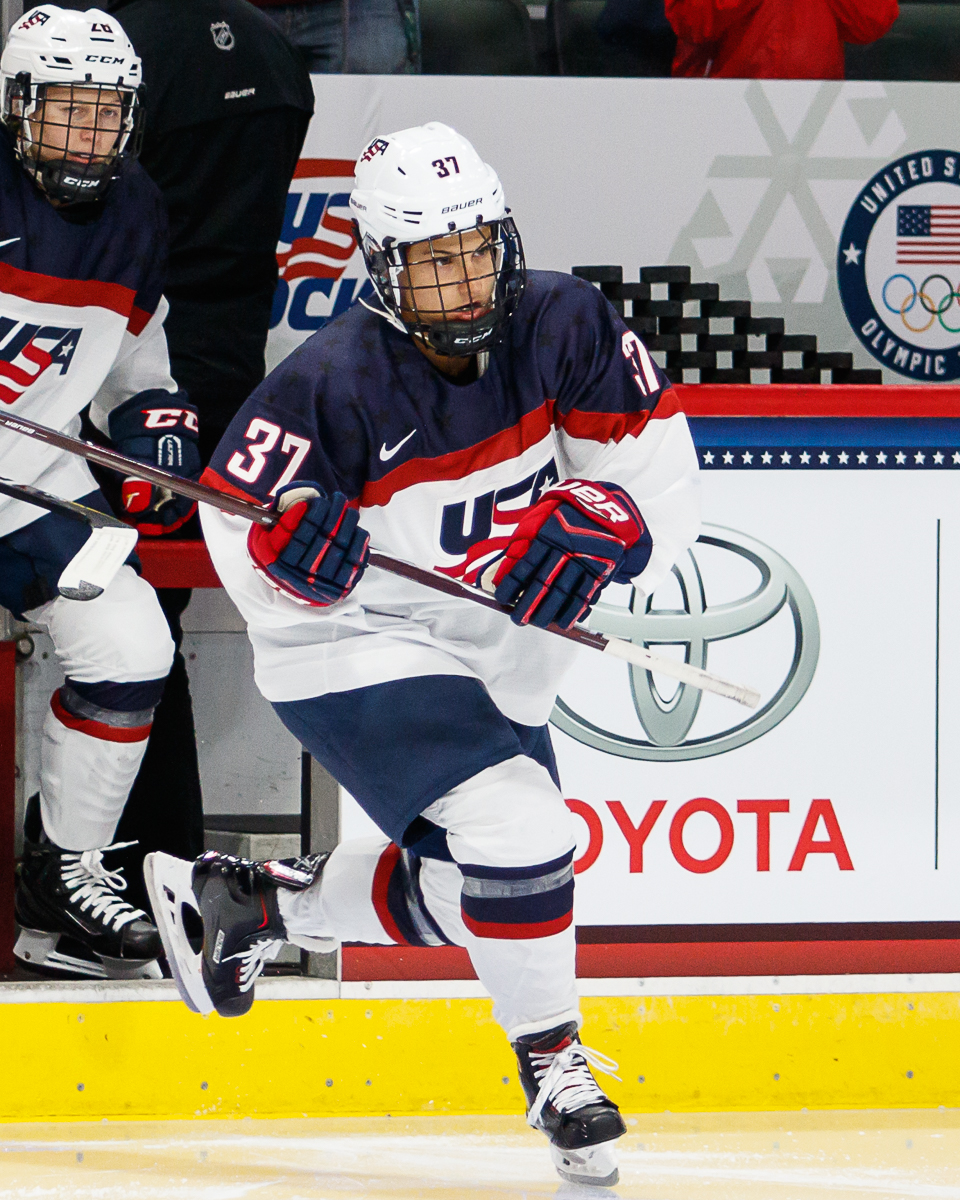
- Pelkey playing for Team USA in 2017
- Born: May 29, 1993 (age 33) Montpelier, Vermont, U.S.
- Height: 5 ft 3 in (160 cm)
- Weight: 130 lb (59 kg; 9 st 4 lb)
- Position: Forward
- Shot: Right
- PWHL team Former teams: Boston Fleet: Metropolitan Riveters; PWHPA Calgary; Boston Pride; Vermont Catamounts
- National team: United States
- Playing career: 2011–2025
Medal record
Olympic Games
| Gold medal – first place | 2018 Pyeongchang | Ice hockey |
World Championship
| Gold medal – first place | 2016 Canada |
| Gold medal – first place | 2017 United States |

Amanda Pelkey (born May 29, 1993) is an American retired professional ice hockey forward who played most recently for the Boston Fleet of the Professional Women's Hockey League (PWHL). She previously played in the Premier Hockey Federation (PHF) with the Metropolitan Riveters. She won the Isobel Cup in 2016 with the Boston Pride and was previously affiliated with the Calgary section of the Professional Women's Hockey Players Association (PWHPA). Her college ice hockey career was played with the Vermont Catamounts women's ice hockey program in the Hockey East conference of the NCAA Division I.

== Playing career ==
=== Early career ===
As a teenager, Amanda Pelkey played for North American Hockey Academy (NAHA) White, based in Stowe, Vermont, part of the Junior Women's Hockey League. She played in the 2010–11 season for NAHA White, and was selected for the JWHL All-Star Game during the 2011 JWHL Challenge Cup.

=== University of Vermont Catamounts ===
Pelkey entered the 2011–12 NCAA season as a freshman, playing all 32 games of the season. Her sophomore year, the 2012–13 season, she tied for second on the team in points with twenty (nine goals, eleven assists) even though she missed the first month of the season with an injury (a broken collarbone sustained at the U.S. National Team Evaluation Camp during the summer).

Pelkey's junior year, 2013–14, was her best yet. She set single-season program records in goals (21) and points (40); she tied the program record for points in a single game with four in an October 2013 game against RIT; and she tied the single-season record with seven power play goals.

Pelkey started to become a leader on her team during her junior year, and her senior year, she was named co-captain of the Catamounts. Pelkey finished her college career as Vermont's all-time leader in goals (49), assists (56), and points (105).

=== NWHL ===
On June 22, 2015, Pelkey became the first player ever to sign with the Boston Pride, signing prior to the 2015–16 inaugural NWHL season. The Boston Pride won the Isobel Cup in their inaugural season, with Pelkey contributing ten points in 16 regular season games.

Pelkey was selected to participate in the 1st NWHL All-Star Game, which took place on January 24, 2016 at Harbor Center in Buffalo, New York.

=== International play ===
In January 2011, Pelkey played for Team USA in the IIHF Women's World U18 Championships, winning a gold medal. She'd also won a gold in the tournament with Team USA in 2009 at age 16. She tied for first in scoring in the 2011 tournament, with ten points (four goals and six assists) in five games. She followed that up with a silver medal with Team USA in 2012. Pelkey also played in two IIHF World Women's Championships, winning gold with Team USA in 2016 and 2017, and was named to Team USA's 2018 Winter Olympics roster where she helped them win gold.

=== PWHL ===
Pelkey played for the Boston Fleet (formerly PWHL Boston) of the PWHL. In the league's inaugural season, she played in 23 regular season games, recording 1 goal and 1 assist. In the playoffs, she played in all 8 games for the team, recording 2 goals and 1 assist as the team went on to lose 3-2 in the Walter Cup finals to the Minnesota Frost.

== Personal life ==
Pelkey married two-time Olympic ice hockey medalist Venla Hovi in August 2023. They welcomed their first child on September 10, 2024.

== Career statistics ==
=== Regular season and playoffs ===
| | | | Regular season | | | | | Playoffs |
| Season | Team | League | GP | G | A | Pts | PIM | GP | G | A | Pts | PIM |
|---|---|---|---|---|---|---|---|---|---|---|---|---|
| 2011–12 | University of Vermont | Hockey East | 32 | 5 | 9 | 14 | 40 | – | – | – | – | – |
| 2012–13 | University of Vermont | Hockey East | 25 | 9 | 11 | 20 | 18 | – | – | – | – | – |
| 2013–14 | University of Vermont | Hockey East | 36 | 21 | 19 | 40 | 22 | – | – | – | – | – |
| 2014–15 | University of Vermont | Hockey East | 34 | 14 | 17 | 31 | 24 | – | – | – | – | – |
| 2015–16 | Boston Pride | NWHL | 16 | 7 | 3 | 10 | 12 | 4 | 1 | 3 | 4 | 2 |
| 2016–17 | Boston Pride | NWHL | 17 | 2 | 5 | 7 | 10 | 2 | 0 | 0 | 0 | 2 |
| 2018–19 | Boston Pride | NWHL | 16 | 5 | 7 | 12 | 4 | 1 | 0 | 0 | 0 | 4 |
| 2019–20 | Independent | PWHPA | – | – | – | – | – | – | – | – | – | – |
| 2020–21 | Team Scotiabank | PWHPA | – | – | – | – | – | – | – | – | – | – |
| 2021–22 | Team Scotiabank | PWHPA | 8 | 4 | 5 | 9 | 4 | – | – | – | – | – |
| 2022–23 | Metropolitan Riveters | PHF | 24 | 5 | 14 | 19 | 20 | – | – | – | – | – |
| 2023–24 | PWHL Boston | PWHL | 23 | 1 | 1 | 2 | 8 | 8 | 2 | 1 | 3 | 0 |
| 2024–25 | Boston Fleet | PWHL | 25 | 3 | 2 | 5 | 10 | 0 | 0 | 0 | 0 | 0 |
| NCAA totals | | | 127 | 49 | 56 | 105 | 104 | – | – | – | – | – |
| NWHL/PHF totals | | | 73 | 19 | 29 | 48 | 46 | 7 | 1 | 3 | 4 | 8 |
| PWHPA totals | | | 8 | 4 | 5 | 9 | 4 | – | – | – | – | – |
| PWHL totals | | | 48 | 4 | 3 | 7 | 18 | 8 | 2 | 1 | 3 | 0 |

=== International ===
| Year | Team | Event | Result | GP | G | A | Pts | PIM |
|---|---|---|---|---|---|---|---|---|
| 2009 | United States | U18 | 1st place, gold medalist(s) | 5 | 3 | 3 | 6 | 4 |
| 2010 | United States | U18 | 2nd place, silver medalist(s) | 5 | 0 | 7 | 7 | 4 |
| 2011 | United States | U18 | 1st place, gold medalist(s) | 5 | 4 | 6 | 10 | 2 |
| 2016 | United States | WC | 1st place, gold medalist(s) | 4 | 0 | 0 | 0 | 0 |
| 2017 | United States | WC | 1st place, gold medalist(s) | 5 | 1 | 0 | 1 | 2 |
| 2018 | United States | OG | 1st place, gold medalist(s) | 5 | 0 | 2 | 2 | 2 |
| Junior totals | | | | 15 | 7 | 16 | 23 | 10 |
| Senior totals | | | | 14 | 1 | 2 | 3 | 4 |
