= 2015 Clarkson Cup =

2015 ice hockey championship series

	1	Total
Boston Blades	3*	3
Montreal Stars	2	2
- Location(s): Markham, Ontario
- Dates: March 7, 2015
- Hall of Famers: Stars: Caroline Ouellette (2023)

The 2015 Clarkson Cup was a women's ice hockey tournament that was contested in Markham, Ontario to determine the champion of the Canadian Women's Hockey League from March 4 to 7, 2014. The Boston Blades defeated the Montreal Stars by a 3–2 tally in overtime to claim their second title. The tournament was played at Markham Centennial Centre. The overtime-winning goal was scored by Janine Weber, who became the first European player to score a Cup-winning goal. Weber's stick that she used to score the Cup-winning goal was donated to the Hockey Hall of Fame.

== Bracket ==
Semi-finals
March 4–5, Markham Centennial Centre
Boston Blades	3	7
Toronto Furies	0	3
March 4–5, Markham Centennial Centre
Montreal Stars	4	2
Calgary Inferno	0	0

Clarkson Cup Finals
March 7, Markham Centennial Centre
Boston Blades	3*
Montreal Stars	2*

* - Denotes overtime period(s)

== Championship game ==
March 7	Boston Blades	3–2	OT	Montreal Stars	Markham Centennial Arena	Recap

Scoring summary
Period	Team	Goal	Assist(s)	Time	Score
1st	MON	Ann-Sophie Bettez	Caroline Ouellette, Emmanuelle Blais	0:31	1–0 MON
1st	BOS	Hilary Knight – PP	Kacey Bellamy, Brianna Decker	16:29	1–1
2nd	None				
3rd	BOS	Brianna Decker – PP	Monique Lamoureux, Hilary Knight	6:17	2–1 BOS
	MON	Emmanuelle Blais	Caroline Ouellette, Lauriane Rougeau	9:54	2–2 TIE
OT	BOS	Janine Weber	Tara Watchorn, Corinne Buie	2:12	3–2 BOS

Shots by period
Team	1	2	3	OT	Total
Boston	10	9	8	1	28
Montreal	4	6	4	1	15

== Scoring leaders ==
Player	Team	GP	G	A	PTS	PIM
Brianna Decker	Boston	3	5	3	8	10
Hilary Knight	Boston	3	4	3	7	6
Monique Lamoureux	Boston	3	0	5	5	0
Janine Weber	Boston	3	3	0	3	0
Emmanuelle Blais	Montreal	3	2	1	3	2

== Boston Blades – 2015 Clarkson Cup champions ==
Defenders

- 2 Kelly Cooke United States
- 4 Alyssa Gagliardi United States
- 5 Blake Bolden United States
- 8 Kaleigh Fratkin United States
- 11 Tara Watchorn Canada
- 15 Monique Lamoureux United States
- 22 Kacey Bellamy United States
- 56 Jessica Koizumi United States

Forwards

- 3 Jillian Dempsey United States
- 6 Janine Weber Austria
- 7 Casey Pickett United States
- 10 Megan Myers United States
- 12 Rachel Llanes United States
- 13 Brianna Decker United States
- 16 Ashley Cottrell United States
- 17 Meghan Duggan United States
- 18 Jordan Smelker United States
- 23 Corinne Buie United States
- 24 Denna Laing United States
- 26 Bray Ketchum United States
- 27 Hilary Knight (Captain) United States

Goaltenders

- 30 Brittany Ott United States
- 33 Genevieve Lacasse Canada

Coaching and Administrative Staff

- Aronda Brown (General Manager)
- Digit Murphy (Head coach)

== Awards and honours ==
- Most Valuable Player, Charline Labonte, Montreal Stars
- First Star of the Game, Hilary Knight, Boston Blades
- Second Star of the Game, Brianna Decker, Boston Blades
- Third Star of the Game, Charline Labonte, Montreal Stars
