= Jillian Dempsey =

American ice hockey player (born 1991)

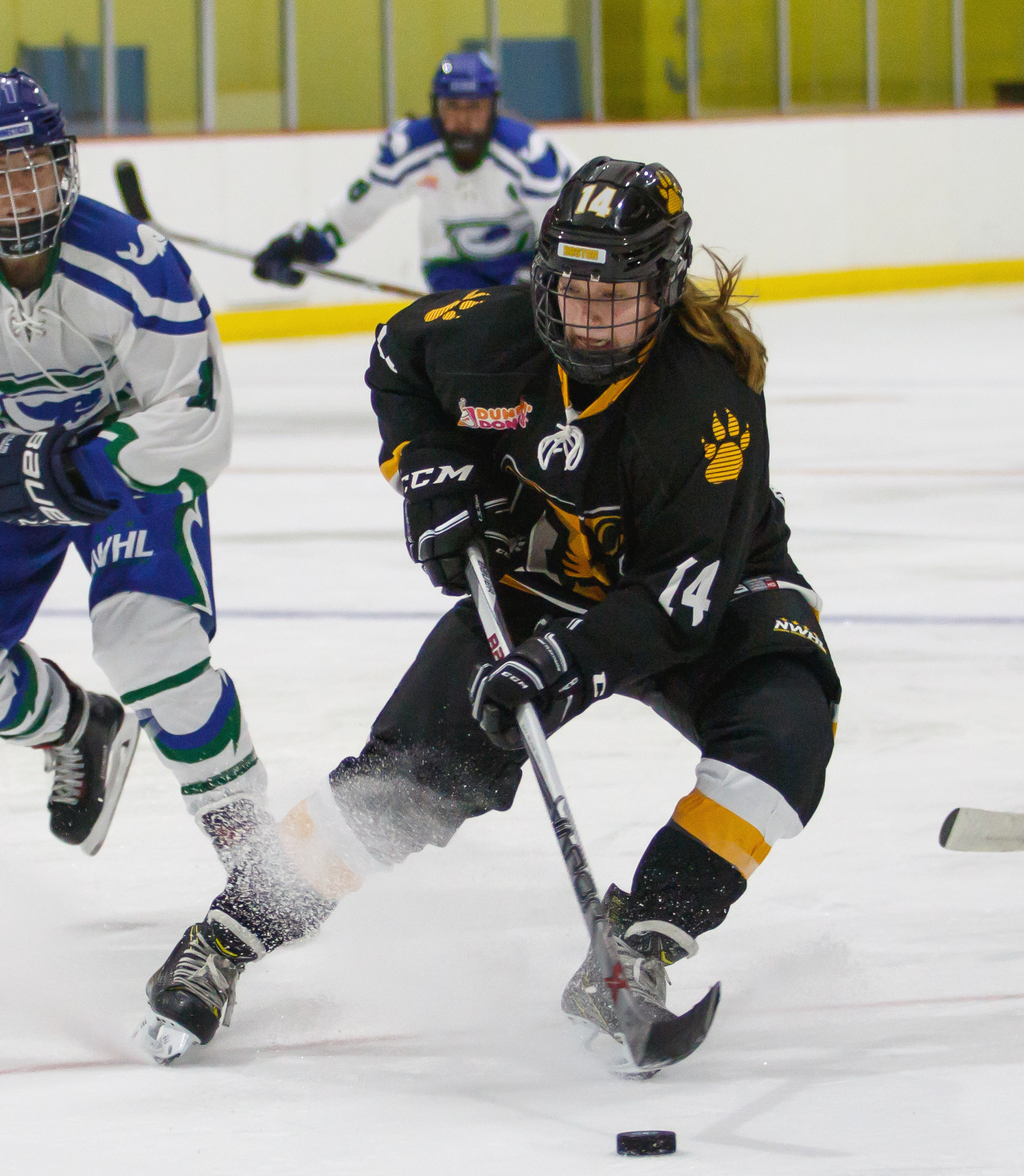
- Dempsey playing for the Boston Pride in 2017.
- Born: January 19, 1991 (age 35) Winthrop, Massachusetts, U.S.
- Height: 5 ft 4 in (163 cm)
- Weight: 135 lb (61 kg; 9 st 9 lb)
- Position: Forward
- Shot: Left
- Played for: Boston Fleet (PWHL); PWHL Montreal (PWHL); Boston Pride (PHF); Boston Blades (CWHL); HC Neuilly-sur-Marne (EWCC); Harvard Crimson (NCAA)
- National team: United States
- Playing career: 2011–2025
Medal record
Women's ice hockey
Representing United States
IIHF World Women's Championships
Silver medal – second place	2012 United States	Tournament
Women's 4 Nations Cup
Gold medal – first place	2011 Sweden	Tournament

Jillian T. Dempsey (born January 19, 1991) is an American retired professional ice hockey player. The former captain of the Boston Pride of the now-defunct Premier Hockey Federation (PHF), she holds the all-time PHF records for games played, goals, assists, and points, and is one of only two players to have won the Isobel Cup three times. She ended her career with the Boston Fleet of the Professional Women's Hockey League (PWHL).

== Career ==
She played for the Harvard Crimson women's ice hockey team from 2009 to 2013, serving as team captain in her final season. Across 129 NCAA games, she scored 148 points, finishing in the top-10 all-time scorers for Harvard and being named a top-10 finalist for the 2013 Patty Kazmaier Award.

In August 2013, she was selected as the 10th overall pick by the Boston Blades in the 2013 CWHL Draft. In October 2013, Dempsey joined the Bisons de Neuilly-sur-Marne on loan for the first round of the 2013–14 IIHF European Women's Champions Cup, where she scored 13 points in 3 games.

She was awarded the CWHL's Rookie of the Year Award in 2014 after leading all American-born players in league scoring. The following season, she scored 19 points in 22 games as the Blades won the 2015 Clarkson Cup.

When the NWHL was formed in 2015, Dempsey left the Blades to join the Boston Pride. In 2018, she was named Pride captain.

Dempsey participated in the 3rd NWHL All-Star Game. She played for Team Stecklein in the 2019 NWHL All-Star Game, and served as captain for Team Dempsey at the 2020 NWHL All-Star Game. On Sunday, January 26, 2020, Jillian Dempsey became the first player in league history to reach 100 career points, including playoffs. She reached the century mark with an assist in a win versus the Minnesota Whitecaps.

In February 2020, Sportsnet named her one of the 25 most powerful women in hockey. She shared the 2020 NWHL MVP award with Allie Thunstrom, as the Pride finished as regular season champions. The team made it to the finals of the 2020 Isobel cup before the playoffs were cancelled due to the COVID-19 pandemic.

During the 2020–21 NWHL season in Lake Placid, Dempsey injured her shoulder and played through it until the 2-week season was terminated. When the playoffs resumed in Boston in March, she was again at full health and captained the Pride to their second Isobel Cup Championship as the only remaining player from the first win in 2016.

On December 12, 2022, Dempsey tied a PHF record with six points on Sunday including her first career hat-trick to lead Boston in a 7-5 win versus Buffalo.

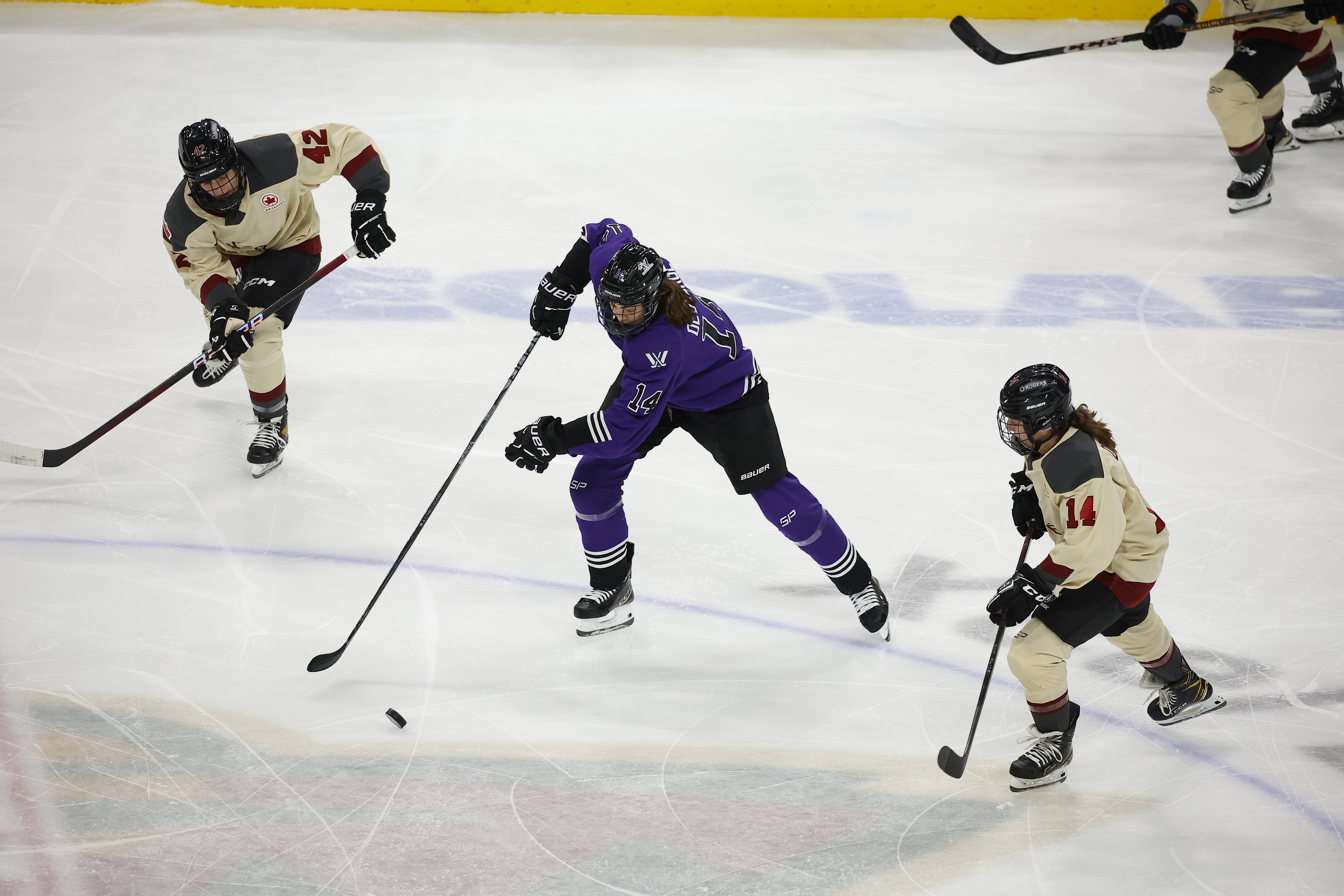
Dempsey (right) with PWHL Montreal in 2024

Following the folding of the PHF, Dempsey was drafted in the 11th round of the 2023 PWHL Draft by PWHL Montreal. On November 9, 2023, she signed a one-year contract with Montreal.

For the 2024–25 season, Dempsey signed a reserve contract with the Boston Fleet. Dempsey appeared in nine games for the Fleet.

A March 8, 2025 contest versus the Montreal Victoire resulted in Dempsey logging two assists. Earning the assists on goals by Jamie Lee Rattray and Amanda Pelkey, it proved to be the final two points of her career. An April 2, 2025 home game versus the Ottawa Charge marked her final appearance on PWHL ice.

In early August 2025, Dempsey announced her retirement from professional hockey on social media.

=== International ===
Dempsey has represented the United States women's national ice hockey team at the 2009 IIHF World Women's U18 Championship and the 2011 4 Nations Cup. She would again play for the US at the 2012 IIHF Women's World Championship, winning a silver medal.

== Personal life ==
She is a graduate of the Rivers School and Harvard College, where she majored in Classics. During her time at Harvard, she lived in Canaday Hall in her freshman year, and later in Pforzheimer House. After completing a master's in education, she joined the Teach For America programme. In 2016, she became a fifth grade teacher in her home town of Winthrop, Massachusetts. She continued teaching while playing in the NWHL, including conducting class from her hotel room during the 2020–21 Lake Placid bubble.

When she was nine, she won a contest to name the Boston Bruins mascot, Blades the Bruin. Her father, Jack Dempsey, currently serves as the Boston Fire Department commissioner.

== Career stats ==
			Regular Season					Playoffs
Season	Team	League	GP	G	A	Pts	PIM	GP	G	A	Pts	PIM
2013–14	Boston Blades	CWHL	24	14	14	28	10	4	0	1	1	0
2014–15	Boston Blades	CWHL	22	9	10	19	17	2	0	0	0	0
2015–16	Boston Pride	NWHL	18	7	7	14	10	4	2	3	5	4
2016–17	Boston Pride	NWHL	17	5	10	15	0	2	1	0	1	0
2017–18	Boston Pride	NWHL	16	7	8	15	2	1	1	0	1	0
2018–19	Boston Pride	NWHL	16	10	4	14	0	1	0	0	0	2
2019–20	Boston Pride	NWHL	24	17	23	40	28	1	1	0	1	2
2020–21	Boston Pride	NWHL	7	3	3	6	0	2	2	1	3	0
2021–22	Boston Pride	PHF	20	7	7	14	6	3	2	1	3	5
2022–23	Boston Pride	PHF	24	14	14	28	6	2	0	1	1	0
2023–24	PWHL Montreal	PWHL	24	1	3	4	2	3	0	0	0	0
2024–25	Boston Fleet	PWHL	9	0	2	2	0	0	0	0	0	0
PWHL totals			33	1	5	6	2	3	0	0	0	0
NWHL/PHF totals			142	70	76	146	30	16	9	6	15	13
CWHL totals			46	23	24	47	10	6	0	1	1	0

== Honours and championships ==
Championships
2016 Isobel Cup Champion
2021 Isobel Cup Champion
2022 Isobel Cup Champion

- Boston Bruins John Carlton Award (2009)
- Harvard Athlete of the Week (Week of February 6, 2012)
- 4x ECAC Player of the Week (Weeks of December 12, 2011, February 6 and 28, 2012, January 7, 2013)
- ECAC Rookie of the Week (Week of November 16, 2010)
- 2010 ECAC All-Rookie Team
- 2010–11 All-ECAC
- 2010 Second Team All-Ivy
- 2013–14 CWHL Rookie of the Year
- 2013–14 CWHL All-Rookie Team
- 2013–14 Leading scorer among CWHL rookies
- 2018, 2019, and 2020 NWHL All-Star Teams
- 2017–18 and 2018–19 NWHL Denna Laing Award
- 2019–20 NWHL Most Valuable Player Award
- 2019–20 NWHL Leading Scorer
