= Corinne Buie =

American ice hockey forward

- Born: March 7, 1992 (age 33); Edina, Minnesota, U.S.
- Height: 175 cm (5 ft 9 in)
- Position: Forward
- Shot: Right
- Played for: Minnesota Whitecaps; Buffalo Beauts; Boston Pride; Boston Blades; Providence College
- Playing career: 2014–2021

Corinne Buie (born March 7, 1992) is an American former ice hockey forward, who most recently played for the Minnesota Whitecaps in the NWHL. She won the Clarkson Cup once and the Isobel Cup twice.

== Career ==
As a high school player, she was a finalist for the 2010 Minnesota Ms. Hockey Award. Buie put up 100 points in 128 NCAA games with Providence.

After graduating, Buie signed with the Boston Blades of the CWHL, with who she would win the Clarkson Cup in 2015.

After just one season with the Pride, she signed with the Buffalo Beauts. The team would win the Isobel Cup in her first season, marking her third straight season winning a professional championship. For the 2017–18 season, she served as the Beauts' captain. She has played in the 2017, 2018, and 2020 NWHL All-Star games.

In August 2020, Buie returned to her home state to sign with the Minnesota Whitecaps, becoming just the second player in NWHL history to play for three different teams. She chose to opt-out of the 2020–21 COVID-19 bubble season, however.

== Career stats ==
=== Regular season and playoffs ===
			Regular season					Playoffs
Season	Team	League	GP	G	A	Pts	PIM	GP	G	A	Pts	PIM
2010–11	Providence Friars	HEA	35	11	13	24	24	–	–	–	–	–
2011–12	Providence Friars	HEA	37	11	15	26	30	–	–	–	–	–
2012–13	Providence Friars	HEA	35	15	11	26	14	–	–	–	–	–
2013–14	Providence Friars	HEA	21	7	17	24	28	–	–	–	–	–
2014–15	Boston Blades	CWHL	20	5	4	9	6	3	0	2	2	0
2015–16	Boston Pride	NWHL	18	3	4	7	12	4	0	0	0	0
2016–17	Buffalo Beauts	NWHL	17	9	3	12	6	2	1	0	1	0
2017–18	Buffalo Beauts	NWHL	15	4	6	10	8	2	1	0	1	0
2018–19	Buffalo Beauts	NWHL	16	3	4	7	4	2	0	0	0	0
2019–20	Buffalo Beauts	NWHL	24	6	7	13	18	1	1	0	1	0
2020–21	Minnesota Whitecaps	NWHL	0	0	0	0	0	–	–	–	–	–
NCAA totals			128	44	56	100	96	–	–	–	–	–
CWHL totals			20	5	4	9	6	3	0	2	2	0
NWHL totals			90	25	24	49	48	11	3	0	3	0

== Awards and honors ==
- 2015 Clarkson Cup champion

=== NWHL ===
- Participant, 2nd NWHL All-Star Game
- Isobel Cup champion: 2015, 2016
