= Alyssa Gagliardi =

American ice hockey player

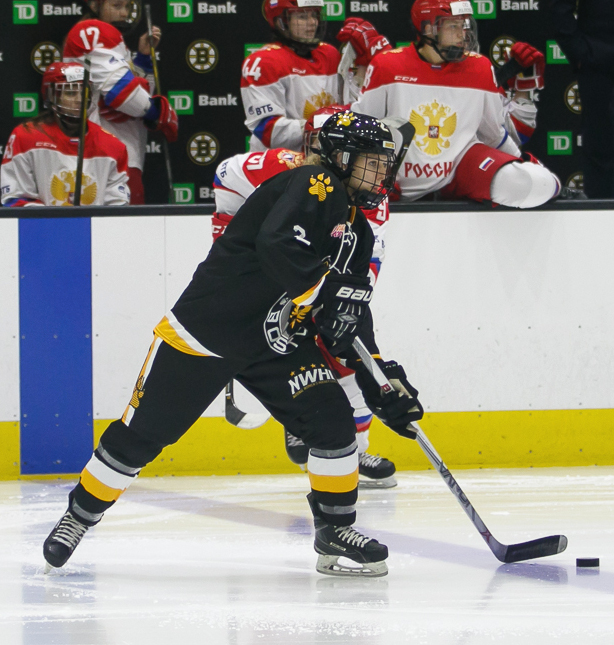
- Alyssa Gagliardi playing for Boston Pride in 2017
- Born: April 2, 1992 (age 33); Pittsburgh, Pennsylvania, U.S.
- Height: 5 ft 5 in (165 cm)
- Position: Defence
- Shoots: Left
- Played for: Boston Pride (NWHL); Boston Blades (CWHL); Cornell Big Red (NCAA)
- Playing career: 2014–present

Alyssa Marie Gagliardi (born April 2, 1992) is an American ice hockey defender currently with the PWHPA. Born in Pittsburgh, Pennsylvania and raised in Raleigh, North Carolina, Gagliardi is one of the first women from Raleigh to become a professional ice hockey player.

== Playing career ==
Gagliardi played NCAA college hockey at Cornell University. During her four years with the team, she accumulated 89 points with the Cornell Big Red women's ice hockey program. Gagliardi was a member of four ECAC championship teams with Cornell. She would serve as an assistant captain for the team in her junior year, and co-captain in her senior year.

=== Professional ===
After graduation, Gagliardi turned professional with the Boston Blades of the CWHL in 2014. During the 2014–15 season, Gagliardi helped the club capture the 2015 Clarkson Cup. Of note, she participated in the 1st Canadian Women's Hockey League All-Star Game.

In 2015, Gagliardi joined the Boston Pride of the new National Women's Hockey League. Gagliardi was selected to participate in the 1st NWHL All-Star Game, which took place on January 24, 2016, at Harbor Center in Buffalo, New York. The Pride would win the inaugural Isobel Cup, the championship of the NWHL. She also participated in the 3rd NWHL All-Star Game. Across 4 seasons with the Pride, she would put up 25 points in 65 games, winning the Isobel Cup in 2016, and being recognised with the NWHL Foundation Award in 2017.

In May 2019, Gagliardi joined the #FortheGame movement, becoming a member of the PWHPA board. Later that year, she was also hired by the Carolina Hurricanes of the NHL as their first girls’ and women’s hockey specialist.

=== International ===
In 2014 and 2015, Gagliardi played for the US National Women's Ice Hockey Team in the Four Nations Cup tournament, winning the gold in 2014 and the silver in 2015.

== Awards and honors ==
- NWHL Player of the Week, Awarded December 4, 2017
