= Lexi Bender =

American ice hockey player

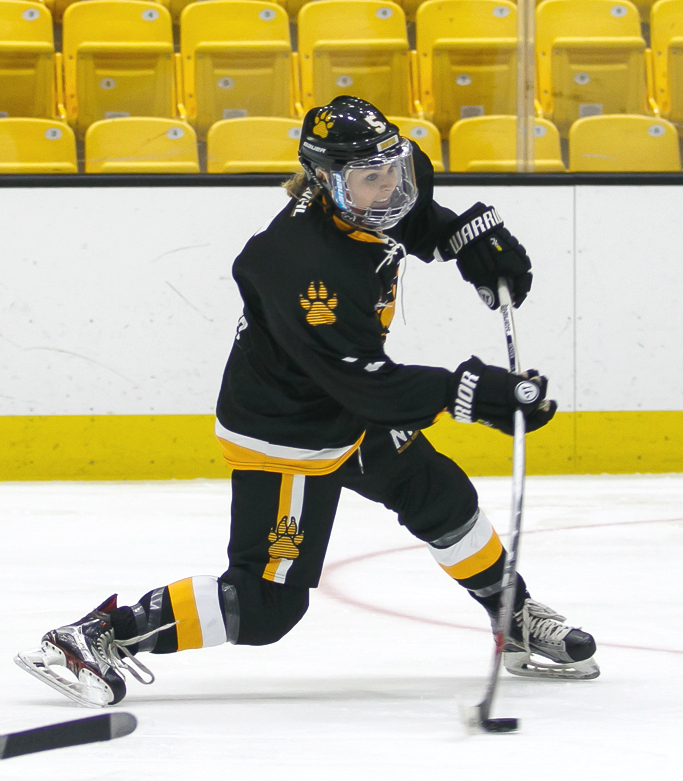
- Lexi Bender playing for the Boston Pride in 2017
- Born: July 22, 1993 (age 32) Snohomish, Washington, U.S.
- Height: 5 ft 8 in (173 cm)
- Position: Defense
- NWHL team: Boston Pride
- Playing career: 2016–present

Alexandra "Lexi" Bender (born July 22, 1993) is a former American professional ice hockey player for the Boston Pride of the National Women's Hockey League (NWHL).

== Personal life ==
During college, Bender played in the NCAA for Boston College in the women's ice hockey team.

== NWHL ==
Bender was drafted 15th overall in the 2015 NWHL draft by the Boston Pride. In 2016, Bender signed a one-year contract to play for the Boston Pride in the 2016/17 season. Bender appeared in all 17 regular season games for the franchise, and two postseason games.

On May 23, 2017, it was announced that Bender had re-signed to play with the Boston Pride for their 2017/18 season. Bender participated in the 3rd NWHL All-Star Game.
