= Centennial Community Centre =

Sports venue in Markham, Ontario

Coordinates: 43.87299°N 79.28818°W

Markham Centennial Centre
- Centennial Arena
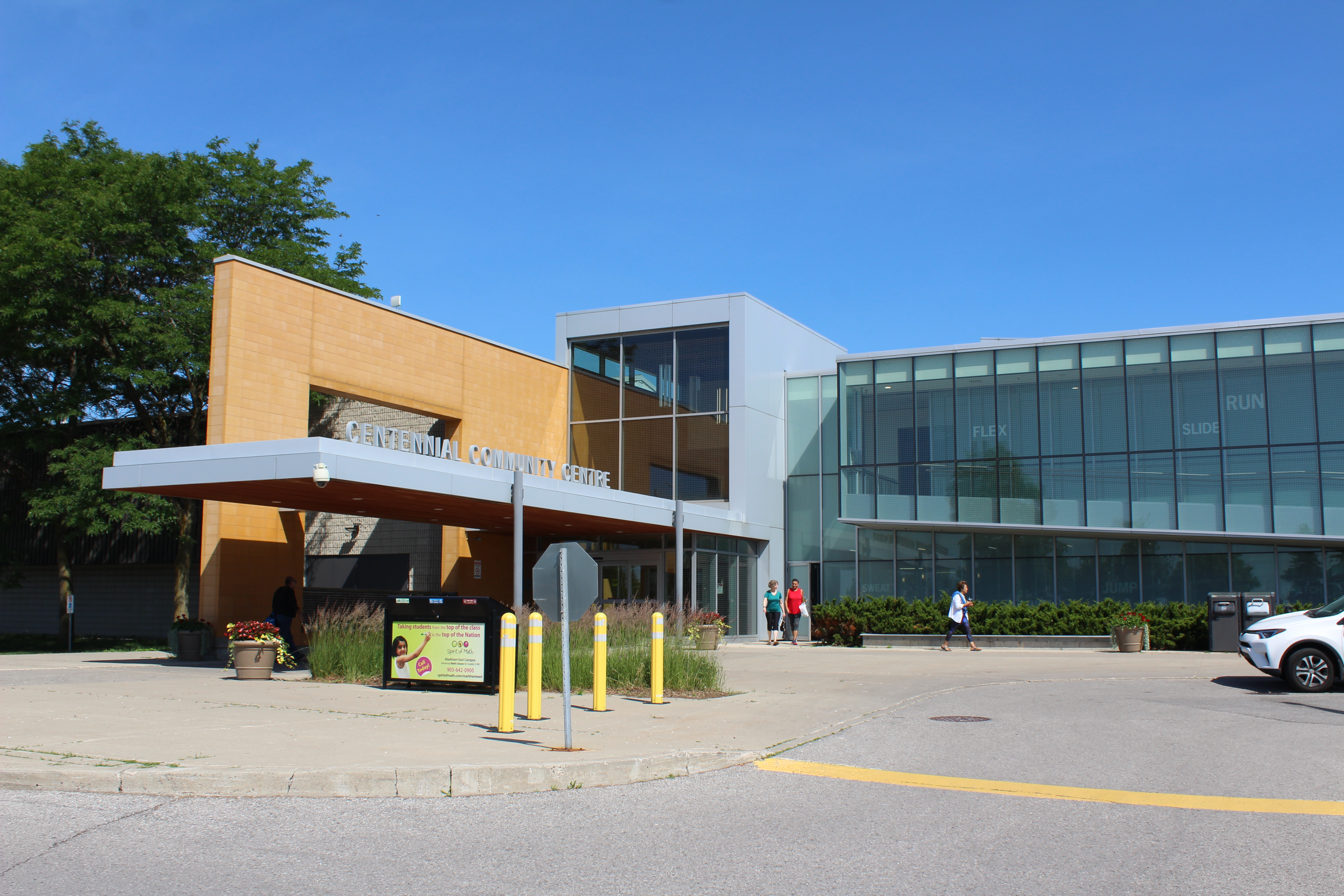
- Interactive map of Markham Centennial Centre
- Location: 8600 McCowan Road, Markham, Ontario
- Owner: City of Markham
- Operator: City of Markham
- Capacity: Ice hockey 2,300

Construction
- Opened: 1974

Tenants
- Markham Royals 2015-present Markham Waxers 1970s-2012 Toronto Marlboros - 1970s

The Centennial Community Centre is a 2,300-seat arena and community centre located in Markham, Ontario, north of Toronto.

The facility was originally built in 1972 as a 1,800-seat arena, and in 1999 renovations were made which expanded beyond the arena.

== Arena ==
The arena was home to the Markham Waxers junior team in the OPJHL, and also occasionally hosted the Toronto Marlboros of the Ontario Hockey League in the mid 1970s. Beginning in 2015 the arena became home ice for the Markham Royals, which saw the Hamilton Red Wings move to become the city's new OJHL team.

The ice rink surface is NHL regulation size with seating around most of the rink.

== Community Centre ==
The expansion in 1999 added additional facilities:

- bocce / squash courts / basketball practice rooms
- Gym
- Program Room
- Pool Training Room
- Meeting rooms
- indoor swimming pool - lap pool and children's pool

An outdoor skate park is located to the west of the community centre across from the ice rink along with two baseball fields (with concrete seating behind home plate) and a soccer pitch (with seating on one side).

== Transportation ==
The arena is located across the street from Markville Shopping Centre and has access to GO Transit's Centennial train station on McCowan Road.

Toronto Transit Commission 129 McCowan North and GO Buses provides public transit connections to MCC. Parking spaces are found on the east and west sides of the building. Centennial train station's parking structure is for GO commuters only.
