= Rachel Llanes =

American ice hockey player (born 1991)

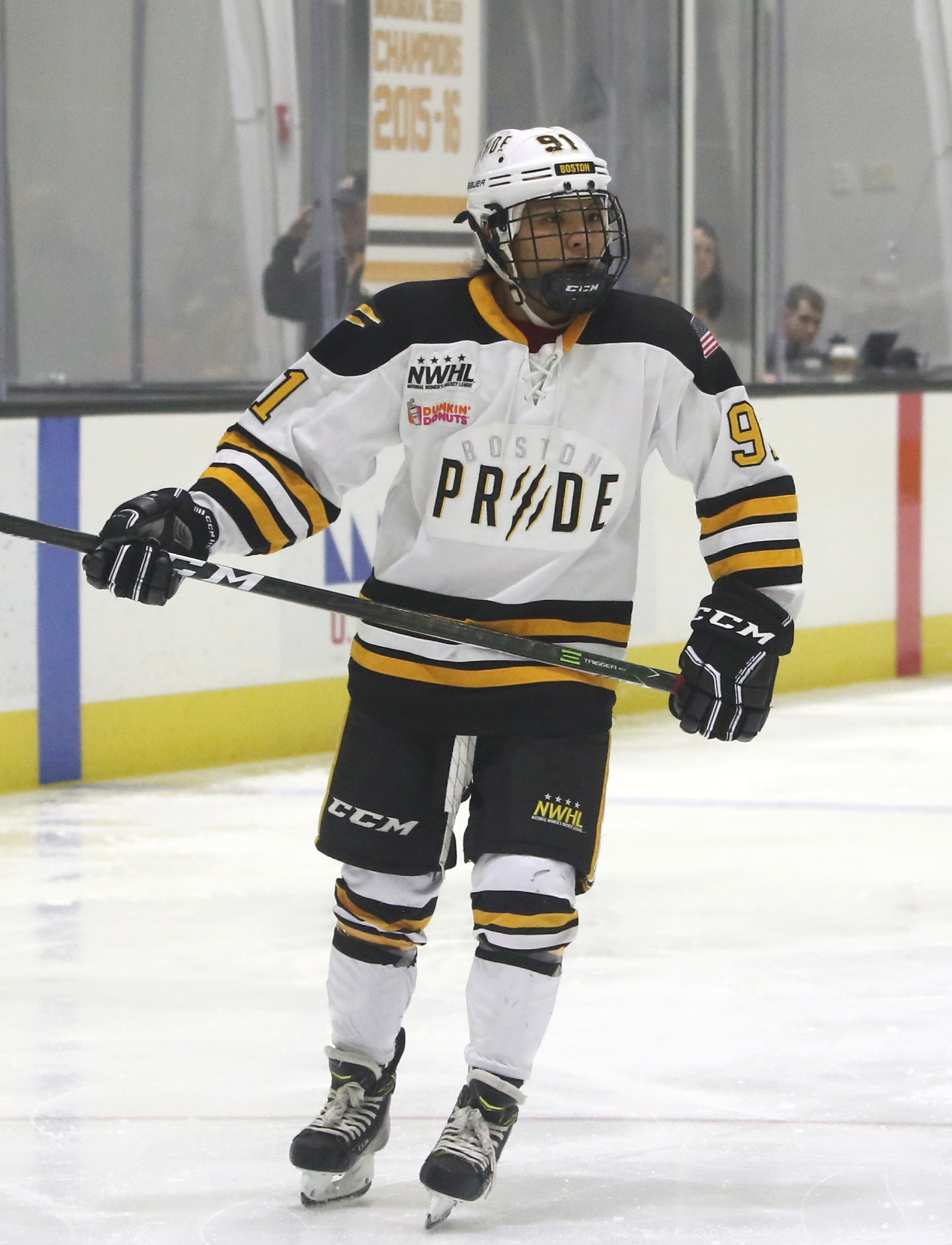
- Llanes playing for the Boston Pride in the 2016–17 NWHL season
- Born: April 29, 1991 (age 34) San Jose, California, U.S.
- Height: 5 ft 2 in (157 cm)
- Weight: 121 lb (55 kg; 8 st 9 lb)
- Position: Forward
- Shoots: Right
- Current team Former teams: Free agent KRS Vanke Rays (ZhHL/CWHL); Kunlun Red Star (CWHL); Boston Pride (NWHL); Boston Blades (CWHL); Northeastern Huskies (NCAA)
- Current coach: San Jose Barracuda
- Coached for: BB&N girls' ice hockey
- National team: China
- Playing career: 2009–present
- Coaching career: 2014–present

Lin Ni
- Traditional Chinese: 林尼
- Simplified Chinese: 林尼
Transcriptions
Standard Mandarin
- Hanyu Pinyin: Lín Ní
- Wade–Giles: Lin Ni

Rachel Llanes (born April 29, 1991), also known by the Chinese name Lin Ni (Chinese: 林尼), is an American-born Chinese ice hockey player and coach. She has served as strength and conditioning coach of the San Jose Barracuda since the 2022–23 AHL season.

As a member of the Chinese national ice hockey team, she participated in the 2022 Winter Olympics and two IIHF Women's World Championship Divisiom I tournaments.

Llanes previously played with the Boston Blades and Kunlun Red Star WIH of the Canadian Women's Hockey League (CWHL), the Boston Pride of the National Women's Hockey League (NWHL; renamed PHF in 2021), and the KRS Vanke Rays of the Zhenskaya Hockey League (ZhHL). She is the only player to have won a championship in the CWHL, the NWHL, and the ZhHL.

== Playing career ==
Llanes began playing hockey in her early teen years and played with the San Jose Jr. Sharks girls' travel team.

She played NCAA Division I ice hockey with the Northeastern Huskies of Hockey East from 2009 through 2013.

=== CWHL ===
Llanes played for the Boston Blades in the CWHL, winning the Clarkson Cup with the team in 2015.

=== NWHL ===
In 2015, Llanes joined the Boston Pride for the inaugural NWHL season, winning the Isobel Cup with the team. In July 2016, it was announced that Llanes would continue with the team for the 2016–17 season, with a pay increase for a one-year $12,000 contract.

=== Return to CWHL & ZhHL ===
In 2017, Llanes returned to the CWHL to sign with Kunlun Red Star (KRS) in China. She also served as the strength and conditioning coach for both KRS and the Chinese national team. She remained with the team through several significant changes, first when it merged with the Vanke Rays to become the Shenzhen KRS Vanke Rays for the 2018–19 CWHL season, and again when the team joined the ZhHL for the 2019–20 season, after the CWHL folded. In their first season as part of the ZhHL, the KRS Vanke Rays became the first non-Russian team to win the ZhHL championship and Llanes earned distinction as the first player in the history of women's ice hockey to win championships in the CWHL, the NWHL, and the ZhHL.

== Personal life ==
Llanes was born on April 29, 1991, in San Jose, California. She is of Filipino heritage.

Llanes holds a degree in criminal justice and psychology from Northeastern University.

From 2014 to 2016, Llanes served as assistant coach to the Lady Knights ice hockey team of the Buckingham Browne & Nichols School in Cambridge, Massachusetts.
