= Gigi Marvin =

American ice hockey player (born 1987)

Gisele Marvin
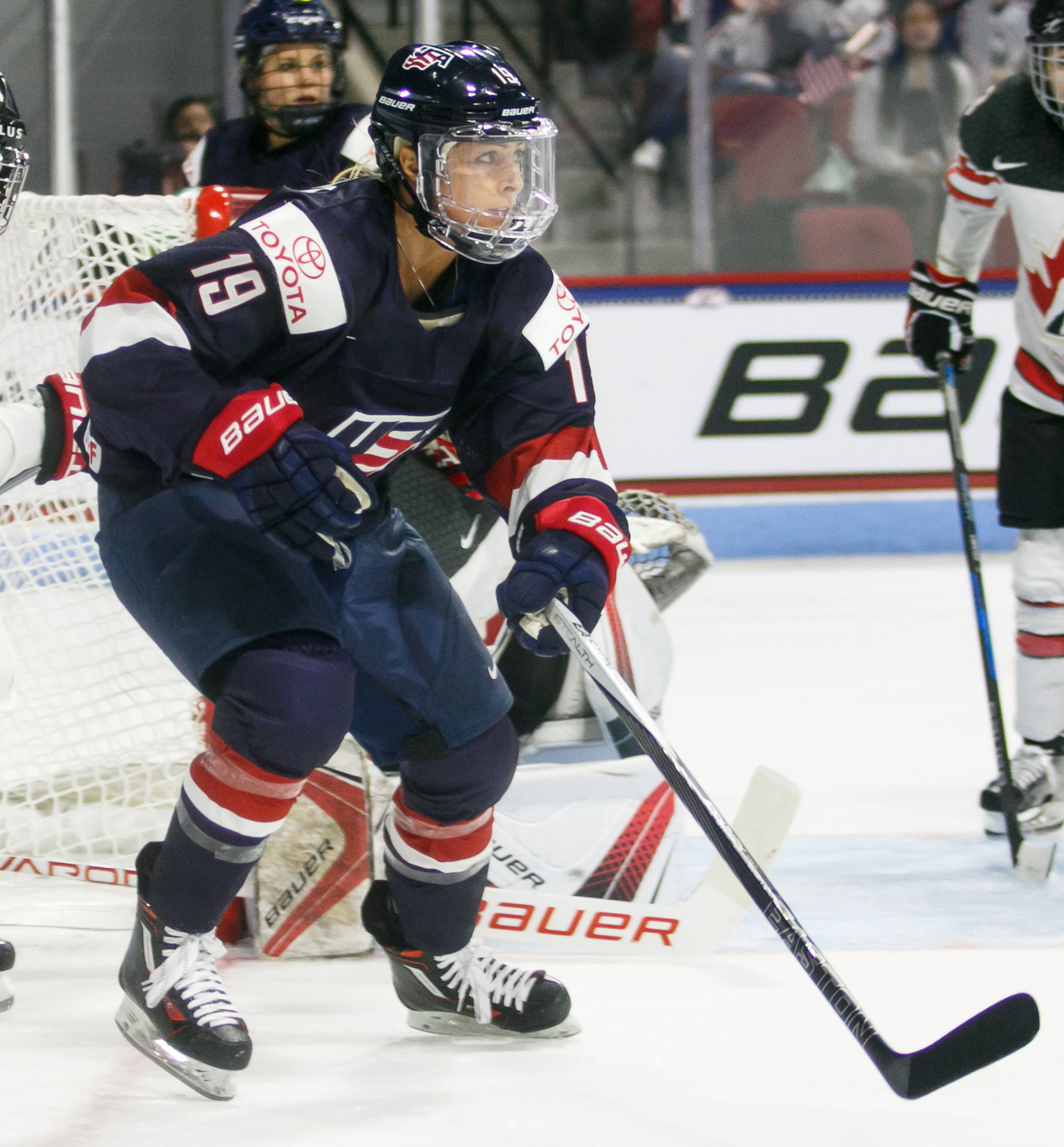
- Marvin with Team USA in 2017
- Born: March 7, 1987 (age 39) Warroad, Minnesota, U.S.
- Height: 5 ft 8 in (173 cm)
- Weight: 161 lb (73 kg; 11 st 7 lb)
- Position: Forward
- Shot: Right
- Played for: Minnesota Whitecaps; Boston Blades; Boston Pride; Boston Fleet
- National team: United States
- Playing career: 2005–2024
Medal record
Olympic Games
Gold medal – first place	2018 Pyeongchang	Team
Silver medal – second place	2010 Vancouver	Team
Silver medal – second place	2014 Sochi	Team
World Championships
Gold medal – first place	2008 China
Gold medal – first place	2009 Finland
Gold medal – first place	2011 Switzerland
Gold medal – first place	2013 Canada
Gold medal – first place	2017 United States
Silver medal – second place	2007 Canada
Silver medal – second place	2012 United States
Silver medal – second place	2022 Denmark

Gisele Marie "Gigi" Marvin (born March 7, 1987) is an American former professional ice hockey player. Between 2010 and 2024, she played for the Minnesota Whitecaps and Boston Blades of the Canadian Women's Hockey League, the Boston Pride of the Premier Hockey Federation, and the Boston Fleet of the Professional Women's Hockey League. As a member of the United States national women's ice hockey team, Marvin won a silver medal at the 2010 Olympic Winter Games and the 2014 Winter Olympics, and a gold medal at the 2018 Winter Olympics. She hails from Warroad, Minnesota.

== Playing career ==
=== High school ===
Marvin attended Warroad High School and was named the 2005 recipient of the Let's Play Hockey Ms. Hockey Award. During her freshman, junior, and senior seasons, she was an All-state honoree. As a senior, she helped the Warroad Warriors to an 18–5–1 record. Statistically, her greatest year was as a senior, when she accumulated 112 points, including 55 goals. She finished her high school career ranking fifth in Minnesota state career scoring (196 goals and 229 assists for 425 points). She earned four letters in hockey, and five letters in both cross-country and softball.

=== USA Hockey ===
- Marvin is a three-time participant in the International Ice Hockey Federation World Women's Championships. She won gold in 2008 and 2009, while winning the silver in 2007. Prior to the IIHF championships, she was a participant on the United States Women's Select Team for the Four Nations Cup. (The team finished first in 2008 and second in both 2006 and 2007.) In addition, Marvin was a four-time USA Hockey Women's National Festival participant (2006–09).

=== Minnesota Whitecaps ===
After the 2010 Winter Games, Marvin joined the Whitecaps for their 2010–11 season. On October 8, in an exhibition game against former WCHA rival, St. Cloud State, Marvin scored a goal.

=== Boston Blades ===
For the 2012–13 season, Marvin joined the Boston Blades of the Canadian Women's Hockey League and helped the squad claim the 2013 Clarkson Cup.

=== Boston Pride ===
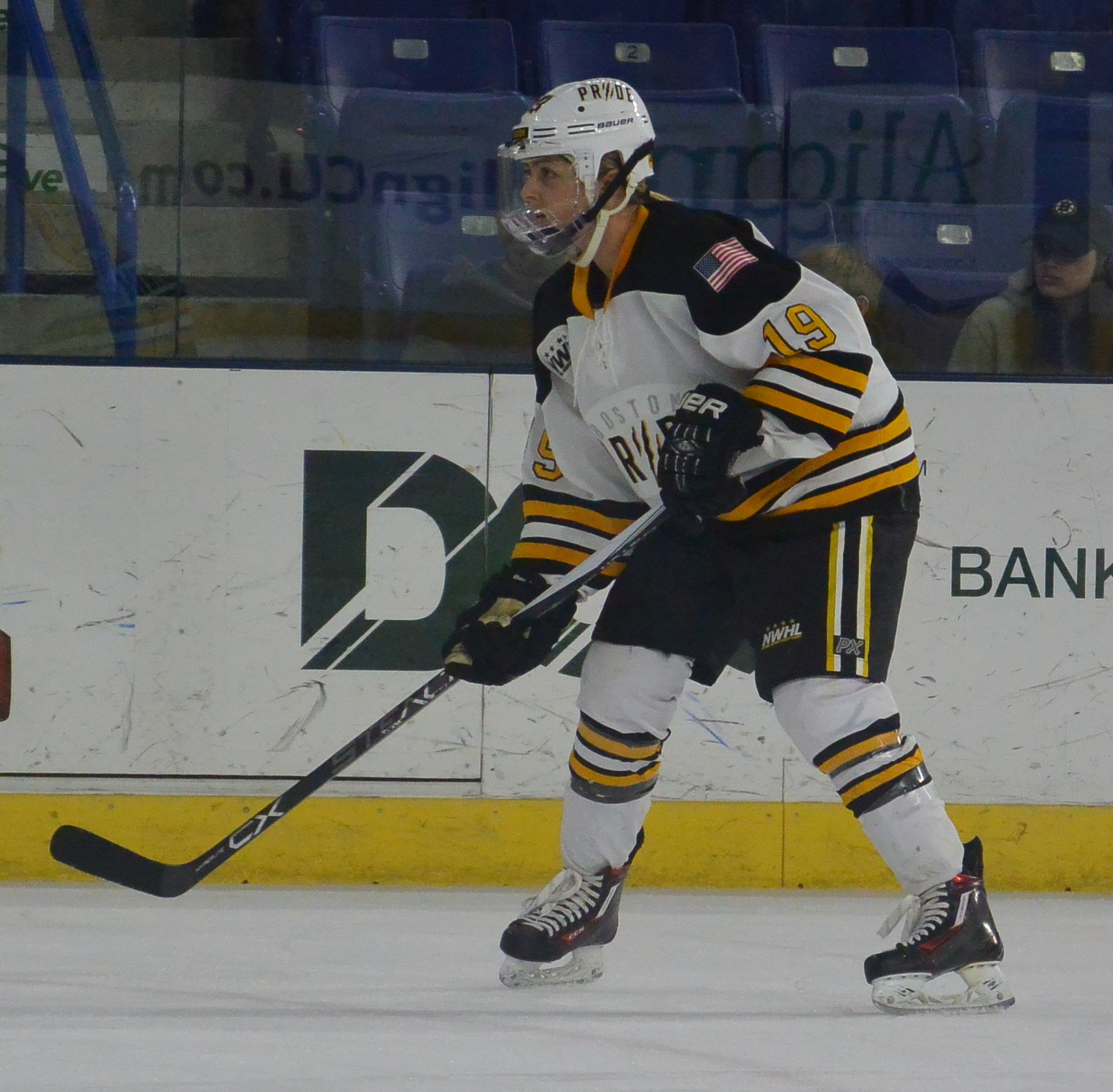
Marvin with the Boston Pride in 2017

On September 25, 2015, it was announced that Marvin had signed a contract to play for the Boston Pride of the National Women's Hockey League. Participating in the 2016 NWHL All-Star Game, Marvin would compete in the Isobel Cup finals. She would score the second goal in Cup history, during the second period of Game 1 against the Buffalo Beauts. She would end her season by winning the 2016 NWHL Defensive Player of the Year Award. Marvin was selected for the 2017 All-Star Game in February 2017 via a fan vote.

=== PWHL Boston ===
On December 20, 2023, after taking a season off from hockey, Marvin signed a one-year contract with PWHL Boston. She played 24 games for Boston, tallying 4 points.

=== Retirement ===
Marvin announced her retirement from professional ice hockey on October 7, 2024, at the age of 37.

== Post-retirement career ==
Following her retirement, Marvin was announced as joining the NESN broadcasting team for Boston Bruins, Boston Fleet, and college hockey games. She also announces for PWHL games.

Marvin is owner and head on-ice instructor of RinkRat 19 Hockey School, a hockey camp in her hometown of Warroad, Minnesota.

== Awards and honors ==
=== College ===
- First-Team All-WCHA, 2007
- First-Team All-WCHA, 2008
- Second Team All-Americans, 2008
- Third-Team All-WCHA, 2006
- Top Ten Finalist, Patty Kazmaier Award, 2008
- Top Ten Finalist, Patty Kazmaier Award, 2009
- WCHA Rookie of the Year, 2006
- WCHA All-Rookie Team, 2006
- 2008–09 WCHA Pre-season Most Valuable Player
- 2008–09 WCHA Student Athlete of the Year

=== NWHL ===
- 2016 NWHL Defensive Player of the Year Award

== Early life ==
Marvin grew up in Warroad, Minnesota. Her family was instrumental in popularizing hockey in Warroad, a town now known for Olympic hockey players. Her grandfather, Cal Marvin, the coach of the 1958 United States Men's National Ice Hockey Team and the manager of the 1965 United States Men's National Ice Hockey Team, is a member of the United States Hockey Hall of Fame.

As a child, she got in a scrap with TJ Oshie at a hockey camp, which those present remember Marvin winning. As teenagers, Oshie and Marvin were named King and Queen of the high school's Frosty Festival.

== Career statistics ==
- The following are career stats from the University of Minnesota
- Note: GP= Games played; G= Goals; AST= Assists; PTS = Points; PPG = Power Play Goals; SHG = Short handed Goals

Year	GP	G	AST	PTS	PPG	SHG
2005–06	41	16	30	46	7	1
2006–07	35	18	20	38	10	0
2007–08	38	23	31	54	5	1
2008–09	38	30	27	57	9	3
Career	152	87	108	195	31	5

== See also ==
- Ice hockey at the 2010 Winter Olympics – Women's tournament
- Minnesota Golden Gophers women's ice hockey
- 2008–09 Minnesota Golden Gophers women's ice hockey team
- 2009–10 United States national women's ice hockey team
