= Zoe Hickel =

American ice hockey player (born 1992)

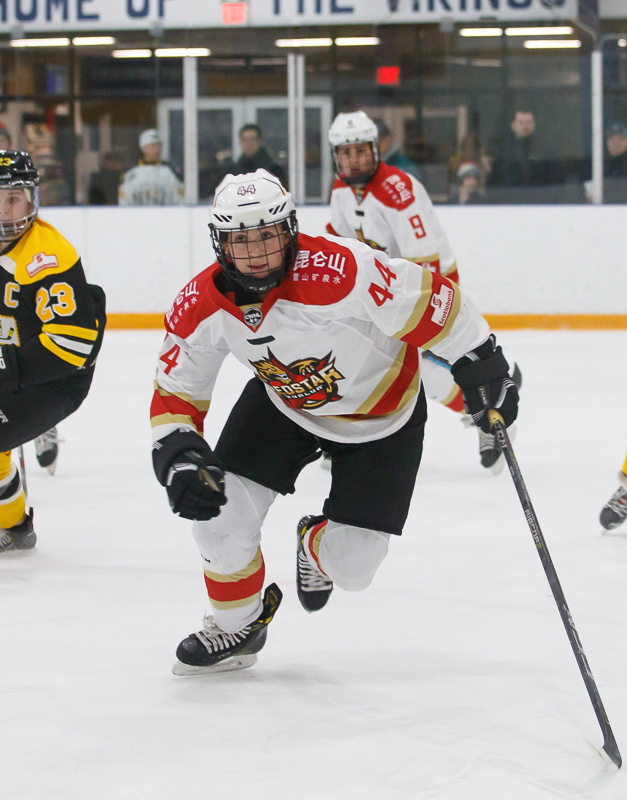
- Zoe Hickel playing for Kunlun Red Star in 2018
- Born: July 10, 1992 (age 34) Anchorage, Alaska, U.S.
- Height: 5 ft 6 in (168 cm)
- Weight: 152 lb (69 kg; 10 st 12 lb)
- Position: Forward
- Shoots: Right
- Played for: Linköping HC (SDHL); Calgary Inferno (CWHL); Kunlun Red Star (CWHL); Connecticut Whale (PHF); Boston Pride (NWHL); Minnesota Duluth Bulldogs (NCAA)
- National team: United States
- Playing career: 2010–present
Medal record
World Championships
Gold medal – first place	2015 Sweden
Gold medal – first place	2016 Canada
World U18 Championships
Silver medal – second place	2010 United States

Zoe Hickel (born July 10, 1992) is an American ice hockey player who currently serves as assistant coach to the Ohio State Buckeyes women's ice hockey program. She most recently played with Linköping HC of the Swedish Women's Hockey League (SDHL) in the 2019–20 season. Hickel played collegiate ice hockey with the Minnesota Duluth Bulldogs program, a member of the NCAA Division I. She competed with the United States national women's ice hockey team at the 2015 IIHF Women's World Championship. In 2015 Zoe Hickel joined the Boston Pride of the National Women's Hockey League (NWHL).

== Playing career ==
Hickel attended the North American Hockey Academy (NAHA) for the entirety of her high school career, from 2007 to 2011. In her senior season with the NAHA, she served as a captain. With the NAHA team, she won the Junior Women's Hockey League (JWHL) Championship twice, in 2008 and 2011.

=== Professional hockey ===
==== NWHL ====
Before the 2017 NWHL All-Star Game in Pittsburgh, Hickel was traded from the Boston Pride to the Connecticut Whale in exchange for the Whale's first-round pick in the 2017 NWHL Draft. At the All-Star Game, Hickel wore the Pride logo on her Team Kessel jersey.

==== CWHL ====
Hickel was selected by Kunlun Red Star of the Canadian Women's Hockey League with their fifth round pick in the 2017 CWHL Draft. On October 21, 2017, the Red Star competed in their first game against the Markham Thunder where Hickel scored the team's first goal, as Kelli Stack and Baiwei Yu both earned the assists. During the season, Hickel returned to her home state of Alaska, as the Kunlun Red Star competed in an exhibition game in Anchorage on January 5, 2018. Hickel finished the season with the Red Star amassing 12 goals and 38 points. Her 26 assists led all skaters in the CWHL during the regular season.

On June 28, 2018, Hickel signed as a free agent with the Calgary Inferno.

== Coaching career ==
In 2024, Hickel joined the USA U18 women's team as an Assistant coach.

== Career statistics ==
Season	'GP	G	A	Pts	PIM
2011–12	36	4	8	12	30
2012–13	30	10	12	22	47
2013–14	36	13	14	27	22
2014–15	33	18	13	31	22

=== USA Hockey ===
Event	'GP	G	A	Pts'
2010 IIHF U18 Worlds	5	2	2	4

=== NWHL ===
Year	Team	GP	G	A	Pts	PIM
2015–16	Boston Pride	15	3	3	6	14
2016–17	Boston Pride	12	1	5	6	8
2016–17	Connecticut Whale	4	3	0	3	6

=== CWHL ===
= Indicates league leader

Year	Team	GP	G	A	Pts	PIM	PPG	SHG	GWG
2017–18	Kunlun Red Star	28	12	26	38	16	1	1	1

== Awards and honors ==
=== NCAA ===
- WCHA Offensive player of the Week Oct. 25, 2013
- WCHA Offensive player of the week Jan. 10, 2014
- WCHA All-Academic team 2013–2014

=== CWHL ===
- First Star of the Game, 2019 Clarkson Cup
