= Brittany Ott =

American women's ice hockey player

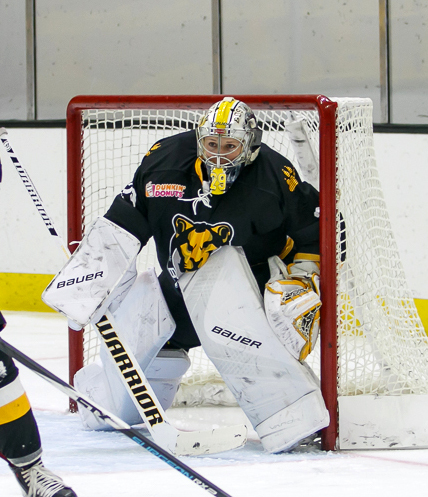
- Brittany Ott playing for the Boston Pride in 2017
- Born: June 12, 1990 (age 35) St. Clair Shores, Michigan, U.S.
- Height: 5 ft 3 in (160 cm)
- Weight: 165 lb (75 kg; 11 st 11 lb)
- Position: Goaltender
- Catches: Left
- PWHPA team Former teams: Team New Hampshire: Boston Pride (NWHL); Boston Blades (CWHL); Maine Black Bears (NCAA)
- Playing career: 2009–present

Brittany "The Otter" Ott (born June 12, 1990) is an American professional ice hockey player. As of 2021, Ott plays for the New Hampshire region team in the Professional Women's Hockey Players Association. She previously played two seasons for the Boston Blades in the Canadian Women's Hockey League and four seasons with Boston Pride of the National Women's Hockey League (NWHL). Ott played college hockey for the Maine Black Bears before declaring herself into the 2013 CWHL Draft. She is the first goaltender to have won the Clarkson Cup and the Isobel Cup in a career.

== Playing style ==
In an article for InGoal Magazine, Ott described how she learned how to maintain focus from former team-mate Geneviève Lacasse: "She said choose two words that you can refer back to, to reset yourself after a bad goal or a bad play to help you get back to where you need to be, leveled off. So I tell myself 'relax' and 'focus'. I say those two words and just breathe in and breathe back out. I'm sure it's different for everyone. Like when I skate to the corner, I tell myself those two words and just try to reset that way." Ott studies NHL goalies Pekka Rinne, Tuukka Rask and Jonathan Quick: "I like watching goalies like Jonathan Quick, he's phenomenal, the way he moves. His lateral game is just unbelievable. I like watching Pekka Rinne. He's excellent, just does whatever it takes to make that save. Doesn't matter if it looks ugly or if it looks pretty, he's just going to make that save. Tuukka [Rask] is awesome to watch, like with his post coverage, he's down on his knees. That's not how I play it but it's still fun to watch players like that."

== Early life ==
Ott was born in St. Clair Shores, Michigan, part of Metro Detroit. She played her minor hockey for the U19 Little Caesars team and HoneyBaked and Belle Tire girls programs, and the Grosse Pointe Bulldogs boys team.

== Playing career ==
=== NCAA ===
Ott played four seasons with the University of Maine from 2009–2013, while studying Kinesiology Exercise Science. The team struggled during her years there, having only one winning record. Ott's consistently play was noted, however, as she always provided her team with the opportunity to win. On October 9, 2010, she recorded 69 saves in a game against the Mercyhurst Lakers. In a 2–1 overtime loss against Boston College on March 1, 2013, Ott made 72 saves, setting the Maine Black Bears program record for most saves in one game. Ott finished her college career with a 2.74 GAA, and a 32–53–13 record. She is first all-time in games played with Maine with 107. She was awarded Hockey East Defensive Player of the Week in March 2013, Hockey East Goaltender of the Month in January 2012, the 2013 M Club Dean Smith Award and was a three-time Maine All-Academic. According to Ott "Playing at Maine allowed me to elevate my game, I was always being pushed out of my comfort zones and being pushed to be a stronger and better teammate and goalie."

=== CWHL ===
In 2013, Ott declared herself eligible for the 2013 CWHL Entry Draft to continue her ice hockey career in the only top-level league. Ott was signed by the Boston Blades. In her first season, she played in 17 games, earning a 10–6–1 record with one shutout. She had an outstanding playoff, allowing only three goals in three games and recording a shutout. Ott earned the start in the championship game of the 2014 Clarkson Cup, becoming only the fourth rookie in CWHL history to start. The Blades lost the final 1–0 in overtime to the Toronto Furies, and Ott was named Third Star of the game.

In her second season, Ott played in 11 games, with a 6–4 record, three shutouts and a 2.1 GAA. Her final CWHL game would take place on March 5, 2015, as she faced 21 shots in a 7–3 win against the Toronto Furies in the CWHL playoffs. The Blades would win the 2015 Clarkson Cup, defeating the Montreal Stars 3–2. Ott played two seasons in the CWHL, compiling a 16–10 record and a 2.41 GAA.

=== NWHL ===
The NWHL, the first women's professional hockey league was launched in 2015. Ott decided to leave the CWHL. On July 8, 2015, Ott signed with the Boston Pride of the NWHL for $17,000. Ott had an outstanding regular season, leading the league in GAA, and recording the league's first and only regular-season shutout. In the 2016 NWHL playoffs, Ott would log a perfect 4–0 record, winning twice against the New York Riveters in the semi-finals and against the Buffalo Beauts in the Isobel Cup finals. Ott was one of four goaltenders named to the 2016 NWHL All-Star Game and was named NWHL Goaltender of the Year.

On May 31, 2016, Ott re-signed with the Boston Pride with a pay increase to $18,000. Ott recorded a 10–1 record with a 1.93 GAA and three shutouts. However, in the Isobel Cup final, the team was upset by the Buffalo Beauts 3–2 for the Isobel Cup. Ott was again named to the All-Star Game.

On August 30, 2017, it was announced that Ott would continue with the Boston Pride in the 2017–18 season. "For me, the end goal remains the same: win a second Isobel Cup for Boston and to continue to grow the game as best as we can. There is nothing like playing in front of the fans we have in Boston."

Ott was one of the team captains at the 3rd NWHL All-Star Game. Of note, she became the first player to appear in three NWHL All-Star Games.

In 2019, Ott was one of several players to boycott the NWHL and joined the Professional Women's Hockey Players Association (PWHPA) seeking better conditions and standards for women hockey players following the dissolution of the CWHL.

=== USA Women's Hockey ===
During the women's national team's dispute with USA Hockey, Ott was contacted as a possible replacement player in the 2017 World Championships, but declined: "From a personal standpoint I have never been invited to a USA Hockey series or camp or anything like that and I would honestly love to be invited to something like that, however at the current time, this is a fight that I believe in and I'm definitely going to stand up and help fight as much as I can."

== Awards and honors ==
=== NCAA ===
- Hockey East All-Rookie Team (2009–10)
- Hockey East Goaltender of the Month (January 2012)

=== CWHL ===
- CWHL Three Stars of the Month (November 2013)
- Third Star of the Game, 2014 Clarkson Cup final
- 2015 Clarkson Cup champion

=== NWHL ===
- 2016 NWHL Goaltender of the Year
- NWHL Player of the Week, November 16, 2016
- NWHL Co-Player of the Week, Awarded January 29, 2018
- 2016 Isobel Cup champion
- Participant, 2nd NWHL All-Star Game
