= Blake Bolden =

American ice hockey player & scout (born 1991)

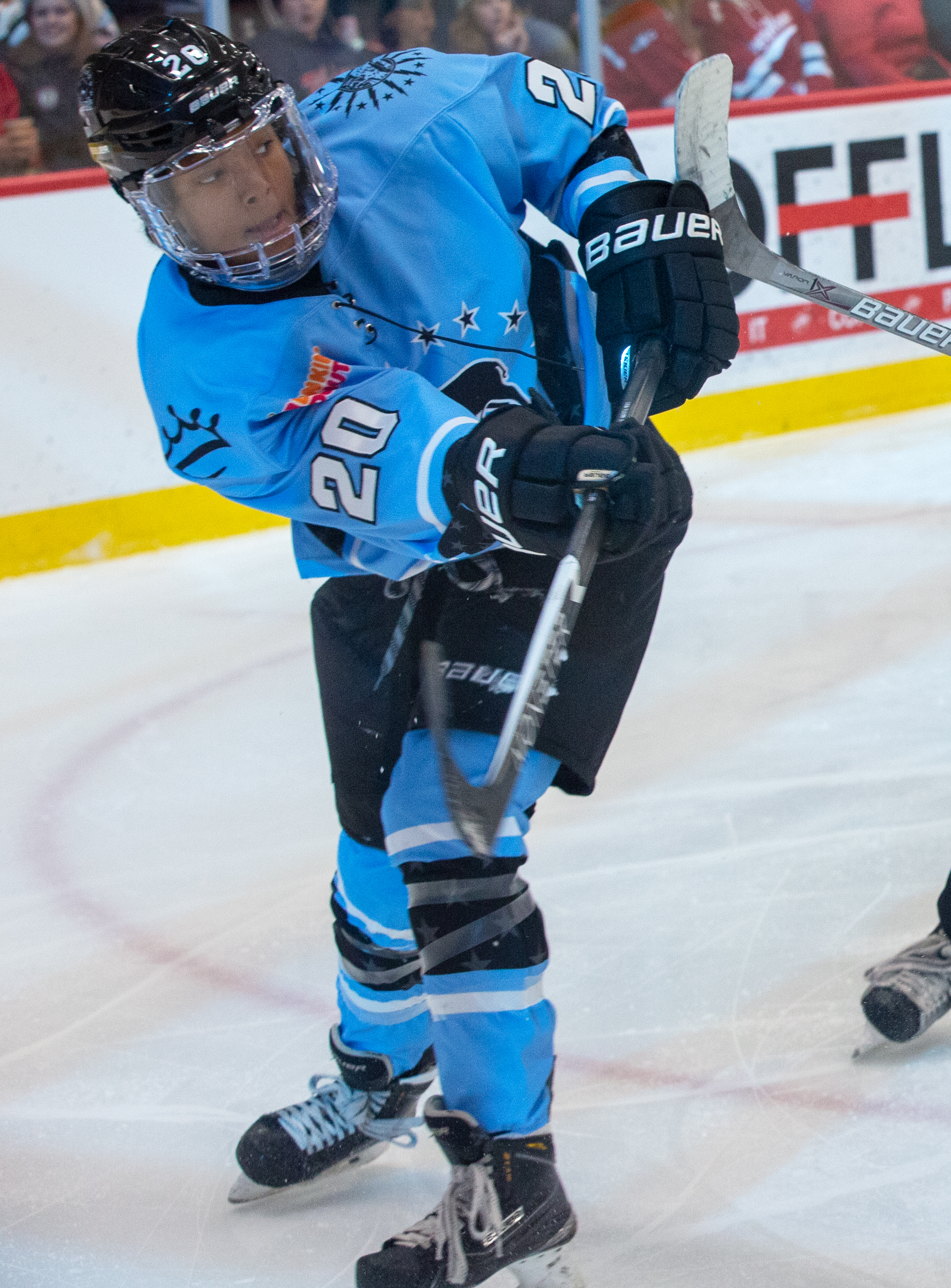
- Blake Bolden with the Buffalo Beauts in 2018
- Born: March 10, 1991 (age 35) Euclid, Ohio, U.S.
- Height: 5 ft 7 in (170 cm)
- Weight: 155 lb (70 kg; 11 st 1 lb)
- Position: Defense
- Shot: Right
- Played for: PWHPA Buffalo; Buffalo Beauts; HC Lugano Ladies Team; Boston Pride; Boston Blades; Boston College Eagles
- Playing career: 2008–2019

Blake Alexis Bolden (born March 10, 1991) is an American former ice hockey player, and scout for the Los Angeles Kings of the National Hockey League (NHL). On October 11, 2015, she became the first African-American player to compete in the National Women's Hockey League (NWHL; rebranded Premier Hockey League (PHF) in 2021). She won the 2015 Clarkson Cup with the Boston Blades of the Canadian Women's Hockey League (CWHL). In 2016, she won the Isobel Cup with the Boston Pride of the NWHL. Bolden is also a contributor and rinkside reporter for ESPN.

== Early life and education ==
Raised in Stow, Ohio, Bolden began following the Cleveland Lumberjacks of the International Hockey League (IHL). Her father worked for the team and facilitated her meeting many of the players. She attended Northwood School, known for its top ice hockey programs, in Lake Placid, New York, where she captained the team during her senior year and played with Kelley Steadman. She attended Boston College, where she played for the Boston College Eagles women's ice hockey team from 2009 to 2013.

== Playing career ==
Medal record

Representing United States

Women's ice hockey

World U18 Championship
Gold medal – first place	2008 Canada	
Gold medal – first place	2009 Germany	

=== NCAA ===
In 2009–10, Bolden led all Hockey East freshmen defenders in scoring with four goals and nine assists for 13 points. Her first collegiate point was a goal in a 1–1 tie against Clarkson on October 3, 2009. Her first assist was also earned in a tie in a 1–1 draw with the Quinnipiac Bobcats on October 16, 2009.

On October 24, 2010, in a 5–2 victory over Brown, Bolden was one of three BC players who scored their first goals of the 2010–11 season. In addition to the goal, Bolden tallied two assists in the win against Brown. It was a career high for most points in one game in her BC career. On December 9, 2010, she was invited to try out for the United States national women's ice hockey team.

In her first three seasons at BC, Bolden appeared in 102 contests. Her 21 points during the 2011–12 campaign ranked second among defenders during Hockey East conference play. Statistically, she amassed 20 goals and 33 assists. She was part of the USA Hockey evaluation camp for the 2012 IIHF World Championship, and was a 2012 nominee for the Patty Kazmaier Award. On August 21, 2012, Bolden was appointed team captain for the 2012–13 NCAA Division I women's ice hockey season. AS A SENIOR (2012–13): Appeared in all 37 games as captain ... totaled 29 points (6G, 23A) ... +38 rating ... seven multi-point games ... ranked second all-time for BC defensemen for points, goals, and assists ... career-high four assists at Boston University (10/31) ... career-high two goals and 13 shots versus Boston University (11/3) ... tallied three assists against Yale in the Nutmeg Classic Championship game (11/24) ... game-winning overtime goal at St. Lawrence (1/4) ... Hockey East Defenseman of the Year ... First Team Hockey East All-Star ... New England All-Star ... Second Team All-American ... Hockey East Defensive Player of the Week (11/5 and 1/7) ... earned Athletic Director's Award for Academic Achievement honors.

=== Canadian Women's Hockey League (CWHL) ===
Prior to being drafted, Bolden contemplated retiring from hockey after not making the 2014 Olympic roster. Selected in the first round, fifth overall by the Boston Blades in the 2013 CWHL Draft, Bolden became the first Black woman to play professional hockey. For this reason many consider her to be the Jackie Robinson of women’s hockey. Bolden competed in the 1st Canadian Women's Hockey League All-Star Game, held on December 13, 2014, at Toronto's Air Canada Centre. In March 2015, Bolden helped the Boston Blades win the Clarkson Cup.

=== National Women's Hockey League (NWHL) ===
The National Women's Hockey League, the first women's hockey league to pay a salary, announced to play its inaugural season for 2015–16. On October 11, 2015, Bolden joined the NWHL's Boston Pride, thus becoming the first Black woman to compete in the NWHL. On December 31, 2015, Bolden and the Pride participated in an outdoor women's ice hockey game against the CWHL's Les Canadiennes de Montreal, known as the 2016 Outdoor Women's Classic and was the first professional women's ice hockey outdoor game. Bolden would score Boston's first and only goal of the game. In 2016, she helped the team win the inaugural Isobel Cup.

Bolden was selected as a player for the 2nd NWHL All-Star Game, in which she won the fastest shot skills game with a shot of 87 mph. In May 2017, Bolden left the NWHL and signed on to play for the HC Lugano women's team in Switzerland.

On August 15, 2018, Bolden signed a contract with the NWHL's Buffalo Beauts and finishing her playing career in May 2019.

=== Overseas ===
During the 2017–18 season, Bolden competed in the Swiss Women's Hockey League for HC Lugano, where she competed in 20 games. She led all defenders on the team with 27 points (16 goals, 11 assists), pacing fourth overall in team scoring with 27 points.

=== PWHPA ===
Bolden participated in the #ForTheGame movement in connection with the PWHPA, which began May 2019. She played for Team Keller against Team Decker in PWHPA's Dream Gap Tour stop in Philadelphia, Pennsylvania.

== Post-retirement ==
=== National Hockey League (NHL) ===
In February 2020, Blake Bolden was hired as a scout for the Los Angeles Kings, the first Black woman to ever scout in professional men's hockey and just the second-ever female to scout in the NHL.

=== Broadcasting ===
In April 2024, Canadian NHL broadcast rightsholder Rogers Communications announced that it had struck a deal to shift a portion of its rights – specifically the Monday night games played in Canada – from its own NHL on Sportsnet broadcast to Amazon Prime Video for the 2024–25 and 2025–26 regular seasons. In September, it was announced that Bolden would provide pre-game, intermissions, and post-game analysis on Prime Monday Night Hockey, which launched with a game in Montreal on October 14, 2024.

== Awards and honors ==
- 2011 Hockey East All-Tournament team
- 2015 CWHL All-Star Game
- 1st NWHL All-Star Game (2016)
- 2nd NWHL All-Star Game (2017) Hardest Shot Winner 87 mph
- 3rd NWHL All-Star Game (2019) Hardest Shot Winner 80 mph
- Clarkson Cup: 2015
- Isobel Cup: 2016
- NWHL Defensive Player of the Year (2019)
