= 2016–17 Ohio State Buckeyes women's ice hockey season =

- Conference: 5th WCHA
- Home ice: OSU Ice Rink

Record
- Overall: 14-18-5
- Home: 5-8-3
- Road: 9-10-2

Coaches and captains
- Head coach: Nadine Muzerall
- Assistant coaches: Jess Koizumi; Karel Popper
- Captain(s): Brianne Grant; Katie Matheny
- Alternate captain(s): Jincy Dunne; Lauren Spring

The Ohio State Buckeyes women's ice hockey program represented the Ohio State University during the 2016-17 NCAA Division I women's ice hockey season.

== Recruiting ==
Player	Position	Nationality	Notes
Samantha Bouley	Forward	Canada	Played Canadian Jr. Hockey with Nepean Jr. Wildcats
Ariana DePinto	Defender	United States	Transfer from Yale
Rebecca Freiberger	Forward	United States	Played with Minnesota Ice Cats
Liv Halvorson	Defender	United States	Came to OSU from Providence Friars (Hockey East)
Katie Mikkelsen	Defender	Canada	Captain for Whitby Jr. Wolves
Jacyn Reeves	Defender	United States	Former starter for Union (ECAC)
Kaylee Remington	Goaltender	United States	Attended Forest Lake (MN) High School
Elise Riemenschneider	Defender	United States	Played with Connecticut Southern Stars
Olivia Soares	Forward	United States	Member of Bay State Breakers
Crystal Sorem	Forward	United States	Attended Benilde-St. Margaret's

== Roster ==
=== 2016–17 Buckeyes ===
No.	Nat.	Player	Class	Pos	Height	DoB	Hometown	Previous team
2		Elise Riemenshneider	Freshman	D	5' 8" (1.73 m)		Rocky River, Ohio	Connecticut Southern Stars
4		Jacyn Reeves	Sophomore	F	5' 8" (1.73 m)		Holmen, Wisconsin	Union (ECAC)
5		Breanne Grant (C)	Senior	D	5' 8" (1.73 m)		New Liskeard, Ontario	Toronto Aeros
6		Lauren Boyle	Sophomore	D	5' 3" (1.6 m)		Eden Prairie, Minnesota	Eden Prairie HS
8		Dani Sadek	Junior	D	5' 9" (1.75 m)		Lakeville, Minnesota	Lakeville North HS
9		Liv Halvorson	Junior	D	5' 9" (1.75 m)		Richfield, Minnesota	Providence (Hockey East)
10		Erin Langermeier	Sophomore	F	5' 8" (1.73 m)		Westlake, Ohio	Connecticut South Stars
13		Jessica Dunne	Junior	D	6' 0" (1.83 m)		O'Fallon, Missouri	Chicago Fury
14		Samantha Bouley	Freshman	F	5' 4" (1.63 m)		Stittsville, Ontario	Nepean Jr. Wildcats
16		Rebecca Freiberger	Freshman	F	5' 8" (1.73 m)		Rochester, Minnesota	Minnesota Ice Cats
18		Julianna Iaffalo	Junior	F	5' 8" (1.73 m)		Eden, New York	Buffalo Bison (WNYAHL)
19		Olivia Soares	Freshman	F	5' 10" (1.78 m)		Hanover, Massachusetts	Bay State Breakers
20		Katie Mikkelsen	Freshman	D	6' 0" (1.83 m)		Oshawa, Ontario	Whitby Jr. Wolves
22		Maddy Field	Sophomore	F	5' 8" (1.73 m)		Oakville, Ontario	Oakville Jr. Hornets
23		Katey Matheny (C)	Senior	F	5' 8" (1.73 m)		Chesterfield, Missouri	St. Louis Lady Blues
27		Lauren Spring (A)	Junior	F	5' 9" (1.75 m)		Kelowna, British Columbia	Pursuit of Excellence
30		Alex LaMere	Junior	G	5' 9" (1.75 m)		Albertville, Minnesota	North Wright County HS
32		Kassidy Suave	Sophomore (RS)	G	5' 9" (1.75 m)		Whitby, Ontario	Whitby Wolves
33		Jincy Dunne	Freshman (RS)	D	5' 6" (1.68 m)		O'Fallon, Missouri	St. Louis Lady Blues U19
34		Kaylee Remington	Freshman	G	5' 11" (1.8 m)		Scandia, Minnesota	Forest Lake HS

== 2016-17 schedule ==
Date	Opponent^{#}	Rank^{#}	Site	Decision	Result	Record
Regular Season
September 30	at Rensselaer*		Houston Field House • Troy, NY	Kassidy Sauve	W 4–1	1–0–0
October 1	at Rensselaer*		Houston Field House • Troy, NY	Kassidy Sauve	W 2–0	2–0–0
October 7	at #1 Wisconsin		LaBahn Arena • Madison, WI	Kassidy Sauve	L 0–3	2–1–0 (0–1–0)
October 8	at #1 Wisconsin		LaBahn Arena • Madison, WI	Kassidy Sauve	T 1–1 ^{OT}	2–1–1 (0–1–1)
October 14	at #8 Bemidji State		Sanford Center • Bemidji, MN	Kassidy Sauve	W 3–1	3–1–1 (1–1–1)
October 15	at #8 Bemidji State		Sanford Center • Bemidji, MN	Kassidy Sauve	L 1–4	3–2–1 (1–2–1)
October 21	#2 Minnesota		OSU Ice Rink • Columbus, OH	Kassidy Sauve	L 2–3	3–3–1 (1–3–1)
October 22	#2 Minnesota		OSU Ice Rink • Columbus, OH	Kassidy Sauve	L 1–2	3–4–1 (1–4–1)
October 28	#3 Minnesota-Duluth		OSU Ice Rink • Columbus, OH	Kassidy Sauve	L 0–6	3–5–1 (1–5–1)
October 29	#3 Minnesota-Duluth		OSU Ice Rink • Columbus, OH	Kassidy Sauve	L 2–3	3–6–1 (1–6–1)
November 4	Lindenwood*		OSU Ice Rink • Columbus, OH	Kassidy Sauve	W 4–0	4–6–1
November 5	Lindenwood*		OSU Ice Rink • Columbus, OH	Kassidy Sauve	W 3–0	5–6–1
November 11	at St. Cloud State		Herb Brooks National Hockey Center • St. Cloud, MN	Kassidy Sauve	W 3–0	6–6–1 (2–6–1)
November 12	at St. Cloud State		Herb Brooks National Hockey Center • St. Cloud, MN	Kassidy Sauve	L 1–4	6–7–1 (2–7–1)
November 18	at Minnesota State		Verizon Wireless Center • Mankato, MN	Kassidy Sauve	W 2–1	7–7–1 (3–7–1)
November 19	at Minnesota State		Verizon Wireless Center • Mankato, MN	Kassidy Sauve	L 1–2	7–8–1 (3–8–1)
December 2	#9 North Dakota		OSU Ice Rink • Columbus, OH	Kassidy Sauve	T 1–1 ^{OT}	7–8–2 (3–8–2)
December 3	#9 North Dakota		OSU Ice Rink • Columbus, OH	Kassidy Sauve	W 2–1	8–8–2 (4–8–2)
December 9	#1 Wisconsin		OSU Ice Rink • Columbus, OH	Kassidy Sauve	L 0–7	8–9–2 (4–9–2)
December 10	#1 Wisconsin		OSU Ice Rink • Columbus, OH	Kaylee Remington	L 0–5	8–10–2 (4–10–2)
January 6, 2017	at Penn State*		Pegula Ice Arena • University Park, PA	Kassidy Sauve	W 5–0	9–10–2
January 7	at Penn State*		Pegula Ice Arena • University Park, PA	Kassidy Sauve	W 6–0	10–10–2
January 13	Bemidji State		OSU Ice Rink • Columbus, OH	Kassidy Sauve	W 2–1	11–10–2 (5–10–2)
January 14	Bemidji State		OSU Ice Rink • Columbus, OH	Kassidy Sauve	L 1–3	11–11–2 (5–11–2)
January 20	at #4 Minnesota		Ridder Arena • Minneapolis, MN	Kassidy Sauve	L 1–2	11–12–2 (5–12–2)
January 21	at #4 Minnesota		Ridder Arena • Minneapolis, MN	Kassidy Sauve	T 1–1 ^{OT}	11–12–3 (5–12–3)
January 27	at #2 Minnesota-Duluth		Amsoil Arena • Duluth, MN	Kassidy Sauve	L 1–6	11–13–3 (5–13–3)
January 28	at #2 Minnesota-Duluth		Amsoil Arena • Duluth, MN	Kassidy Sauve	L 0–3	11–14–3 (5–14–3)
February 3	St. Cloud State		OSU Ice Rink • Columbus, OH	Kassidy Sauve	L 1–3	11–15–3 (5–15–3)
February 4	St. Cloud State		OSU Ice Rink • Columbus, OH	Kassidy Sauve	T 2–2 ^{OT}	11–15–4 (5–15–4)
February 10	Minnesota State		OSU Ice Rink • Columbus, OH	Kassidy Sauve	T 1–1 ^{OT}	11–15–5 (5–15–5)
February 11	Minnesota State		OSU Ice Rink • Columbus, OH	Kassidy Sauve	W 4–2	12–15–5 (6–15–5)
February 17	at North Dakota		Ralph Engelstad Arena • Grand Forks, ND	Kassidy Sauve	W 4–2	13–15–5 (7–15–5)
February 18	at North Dakota		Ralph Engelstad Arena • Grand Forks, ND	Kassidy Sauve	L 2–3	13–16–5 (7–16–5)
WCHA Tournament
February 24	at North Dakota*		Ralph Engelstad Arena • Grand Forks, ND (Quarterfinals, Game 1)	Kassidy Sauve	W 3–2 ^{OT}	14–16–5
February 25	at North Dakota*		Ralph Engelstad Arena • Grand Forks, ND (Quarterfinals, Game 2)	Kassidy Sauve	L 1–4	14–17–5
February 26	at North Dakota*		Ralph Engelstad Arena • Grand Forks, ND (Quarterfinals, Game 3)	Kassidy Sauve	L 1–2 ^{OT}	14–18–5
*Non-conference game. ^{#}Rankings from USCHO.com Poll.

== Awards and honors ==
- Jincy Dunne - WCHA Rookie of the Month
- Kassidy Sauve, goaltender - WCHA Second Team All-Star
- Jincy Dunne, defense - WCHA Third Team All-Star
- Jincy Dunne, defense - WCHA All-Rookie Team
- Kassidy Sauve, goaltender - AHCA Second Team All-American
