= 2016–17 North Dakota Fighting Hawks women's ice hockey season =

- Conference: 4th WCHA
- Home ice: Ralph Engelstad Arena

Rankings
- USA Hockey: Not Ranked
- USCHO.com: Not Ranked

Record
- Overall: 16-16-6
- Conference: 11–12–5
- Home: 9-6-4
- Road: 7-9-2
- Neutral: 0-1-0

Coaches and captains
- Head coach: Brian Idalski
- Assistant coaches: Peter Elander; Erik Fabian
- Captain(s): Amy Menke; Halli Krzyzaniak
- Alternate captain(s): Anna Kilponen; Grace Hirschy; Marissa Salo

The 2016–17 North Dakota Fighting Hawks women's ice hockey season was the 15th and final season of the UND Fighting Hawks. The team represented the University of North Dakota in the 2016-17 NCAA Division I women's ice hockey season. On March 29, 2017, the University of North Dakota announced that the women's ice hockey was being terminated due to budget cuts.

Following the conclusion of the season, eleven players filed a class action discrimination lawsuit against the University alleging violations against Title IX.

== Offseason ==
- July 25: Halli Krzyzaniak and Ryleigh Houston were chosen to participate in the Team Canada Development Camp in Calgary, Alberta.

== Departures ==
With the end of the program, many of the players with NCAA college eligibility successfully transferred to other schools.

| Player | Position | Nationality | Reason |
| Anna Kilponen | Defense | Finland | Transfer to Quinnipiac University |
| Gracen Hirschy | Defense | United States | Graduation; signed with Djurgårdens IF |
| Jordan Hampton | Defense | United States | Graduation; signed with the Boston Blades |
| Annelise Rice | Forward | United States | Signed with the Minnesota Whitecaps |
| Sarah Lecavalier | Forward | Canada | Transfer to Robert Morris University |
| Charly Dahlquist | Forward | Canada | Transfer to Ohio State University |
| Ryleigh Houston | Forward | Canada | Transfer to University of Minnesota Duluth |
| Marissa Salo | Forward | United States | Graduation |
| Kayla Gardner | Forward | Canada | Graduation; Drafted by the Calgary Inferno |
| Vilma Tanskanen | Forward | United States | Transfer to Mercyhurst University |
| Dorci Medgyes | Forward/Defense | Hungary | Signed with EKU Mannheim II |
| Halli Krzyzaniak | Defense | Canada | Graduation; drafted by the Calgary Inferno |
| Taylor Flaherty | Defense | United States | Transfer to University of Vermont |
| Emma Nuutinen | Forward | Finland | Transfer to Mercyhurst |
| Amy Menke | Forward | United States | Signed with the Minnesota Whitecaps |
| Alyssa MacMillan | Forward | Canada | Transfer to University of Ottawa |
| Breanna Berndsen | Forward | Canada | Transfer to University of Toronto |
| Lexie Shaw | Goaltender | United States | Graduation |
| Kennedy Blair | Goaltender | United States | Transfer to Mercyhurst |
| Hallie Theodosopoulos | Forward/Defense | United States | Transfer to St. Cloud State University |
| Annie Chipman | Goaltender | Canada | Graduation |
| Rebekah Kolstad | Forward | United States | Transfer to Minnesota State University |
| Kristen Campbell | Goaltender | Canada | Transfer to University of Wisconsin |
| Lisa Marvin | Forward | United States | Graduation |

== Incoming ==
| Player | Position | Nationality | Notes |
| Kennedy Blair | Goaltender | United States | Goaltender for Minnesota Revolution |
| Ryleigh Houston | Forward | Canada | Appeared in two IIHF U18 World Championships for Canada |
| Sarah Lecavalier | Forward | Canada | Attended Pursuit of Excellence Academy |
| Alyssa MacMillan | Forward | Canada | Attended Okanagan Hockey Academy |
| Emma Nuutinen | Forward | Finland | Played for Team Finland at the 2014 Olympics |
| Annelise Rice | Forward | United States | Attended Minnetonka (MN) HS |
| Abbey Stanley | Defender | United States | Spring, 2016 redshirt addition |
| Abby Thiessen | Defender | Canada | Member of Team Alberta U18 |

== Standings ==
2016–17 Western Collegiate Hockey Association standings
| | Conference | | | | | | | | Overall | | | | | |
| | GP | W | L | T | SW | PTS | GF | GA | GP | W | L | T | GF | GA |
|---|---|---|---|---|---|---|---|---|---|---|---|---|---|---|
| #2 Wisconsin*† | 28 | 22 | 2 | 4 | 3 | 73 | 110 | 24 | 40 | 33 | 3 | 4 | 157 | 35 |
| #4 Minnesota | 28 | 19 | 4 | 5 | 3 | 65 | 88 | 46 | 39 | 26 | 8 | 5 | 124 | 69 |
| #5 Minnesota Duluth | 28 | 19 | 5 | 4 | 1 | 62 | 82 | 47 | 37 | 25 | 7 | 5 | 110 | 62 |
| North Dakota | 28 | 11 | 12 | 5 | 3 | 41 | 62 | 57 | 38 | 16 | 16 | 6 | 84 | 73 |
| Ohio State | 28 | 7 | 16 | 5 | 2 | 28 | 40 | 73 | 37 | 14 | 18 | 5 | 69 | 82 |
| St. Cloud State | 28 | 7 | 18 | 3 | 2 | 26 | 43 | 82 | 36 | 9 | 23 | 4 | 61 | 113 |
| Bemidji State | 28 | 7 | 18 | 3 | 1 | 25 | 49 | 80 | 35 | 12 | 20 | 3 | 67 | 90 |
| Minnesota State | 28 | 4 | 21 | 3 | 1 | 16 | 33 | 98 | 37 | 7 | 26 | 4 | 45 | 127 |
Championship: Wisconsin † indicates conference regular season champion * indicates conference tournament champion Current rankings: USCHO.com Division I women's poll

== Roster ==
| No. | Nat. | Player | Class | Pos | Height | DoB | Hometown | Previous team |
|---|---|---|---|---|---|---|---|---|
| 5 | (Finland) | Anna Kilponen (A) | Sophomore | D | 5' 7" (1.7 m) | 1995-05-16 | Orivesi, Finland | Finnish National Team |
| 6 | (United States) | Gracen Hirschy (A) | Senior | D | 5' 9" (1.75 m) | 1995-04-04 | Fort Wayne, Indiana | Culver Academy (USHS) |
| 7 | (United States) | Jordan Hampton | Senior (RS) | D | 5' 7" (1.7 m) | 1994-02-17 | Foxborough, Massachusetts | Northeastern (NCAA) |
| 8 | (United States) | Annelise Rice | Freshman | F | 5' 7" (1.7 m) | 1997-05-04 | Excelsior, Minnesota | Minnetonka HS (USHS) |
| 9 | (Canada) | Sarah Lecavalier | Freshman | F | 5' 4" (1.63 m) | 1998-03-11 | Strathmore, Alberta | Pursuit of Excellence (CSSHL) |
| 10 | (Canada) | Charly Dahlquist | Sophomore | F | 5' 6" (1.68 m) | | Eden Prairie, Minnesota | Eden Prairie HS (USHS) |
| 12 | (Canada) | Ryleigh Houston | Freshman | F | 5' 4" (1.63 m) | 1998-09-14 | Winnipeg, Manitoba | Team Canada U18 |
| 14 | (United States) | Marissa Salo (A) | Senior | F | 5' 8" (1.73 m) | 1994-00-00 | Grand Rapids, Minnesota | North American Hockey Academy |
| 15 | (Canada) | Kayla Gardner | Senior | F | 5' 9" (1.75 m) | 1994-11-16 | Warroad, Minnesota | Warroad HS |
| 16 | (Finland) | Vilma Tanskanen | Sophomore | F | 5' 9" (1.75 m) | 1995-04-14 | Vantaa, Finland | Finnish National Team |
| 17 | (Hungary) | Dorci Medgyes | Sophomore | F/D | 5' 10" (1.78 m) | 1996-03-09 | Budapest, Hungary | Hungarian National Team |
| 18 | (Canada) | Halli Krzyzaniak (C) | Senior | D | 5' 9" (1.75 m) | 1995-02-04 | Neepawa, Manitoba | Pursuit of Excellence (CAHS) |
| 19 | (United States) | Taylor Flaherty | Sophomore | D | 5' 9" (1.75 m) | 1996-01-16 | Lakeville, Minnesota | Lakeville North HS (USHS) |
| 20 | (Finland) | Emma Nuutinen | Freshman | F | 5' 10" (1.78 m) | 1996-12-07 | Vantaa, Finland | Finnish National Team |
| 21 | (United States) | Amy Menke (C) | Senior | F | 5' 6" (1.68 m) | | Shakopee, Minnesota | Shakopee HS (USHS) |
| 24 | (Canada) | Alyssa MacMillan | Freshman | F | 5' 9" (1.75 m) | 1998-06-12 | Penticton, British Columbia | Okanagan Prep |
| 26 | (Canada) | Breanna Berndsen | Sophomore | F | 5' 10" (1.78 m) | 1997-11-01 | Kelowna, British Columbia | Pursuit of Excellence (CSSHL) |
| 29 | (United States) | Lexie Shaw | Senior | G | 5' 7" (1.7 m) | 1995-03-10 | Troy, Michigan | Honeybaked |
| 30 | (United States) | Kennedy Blair | Freshman | G | 5' 6" (1.68 m) | 1998-04-30 | Bismarck, North Dakota | Minnesota Revolution (USHS) |
| 32 | (United States) | Hallie Theodosopoulos | Freshman | F/D | 5' 6" (1.68 m) | 1997-00-00 | Brookings, South Dakota | St. Louis Blues AAA |
| 34 | (Canada) | Annie Chipman | Senior (RS) | G | 5' 6" (1.68 m) | 1995-00-00 | Winnipeg, Manitoba | St. Mary's Academy (CAHS) |
| 44 | (United States) | Rebekah Kolstad | Sophomore | F | 5' 10" (1.78 m) | 1996-01-21 | Mankato, Minnesota | Team USA U18 |
| 50 | (Canada) | Kristen Campbell | Freshman (RS) | G | 5' 10" (1.78 m) | 1997-11-30 | Brandon, Manitoba | Team Manitoba U18 |
| 55 | (United States) | Lisa Marvin | Senior | F | 5' 8" (1.73 m) | 1994-08-18 | Warroad, Minnesota | Warroad HS (USHS) |

== Schedule ==
| Date | Opponent^{#} | Rank^{#} | Site | Decision | Result | Record |
Regular Season
| September 30 | at Mercyhurst* | #6 | Mercyhurst Ice Center • Erie, PA | Lexie Shaw | W 3–1 | 1–0–0 |
| October 1 | at Mercyhurst* | #6 | Mercyhurst Ice Center • Erie, PA | Lexie Shaw | T 1–1 ^{OT} | 1–0–1 |
| October 6 | at St. Cloud State | #7 | Herb Brooks National Hockey Center • St. Cloud, MN | Lexie Shaw | W 1–0 | 2–0–1 (1–0–0) |
| October 8 | at St. Cloud State | #7 | Herb Brooks National Hockey Center • St. Cloud, MN | Kristen Campbell | L 2–3 | 2–1–1 (1–1–0) |
| October 14 | Minnesota State | #10 | Ralph Engelstad Arena • Grand Forks, ND | Lexie Shaw | W 6–0 | 3–1–1 (2–1–0) |
| October 15 | Minnesota State | #10 | Ralph Engelstad Arena • Grand Forks, ND | Lexie Shaw | W 4–3 ^{OT} | 4–1–1 (3–1–0) |
| October 22 | #1 Wisconsin | #9 | Ralph Engelstad Arena • Grand Forks, ND | Lexie Shaw | L 0–2 | 4–2–1 (3–2–0) |
| October 23 | #1 Wisconsin | #9 | Ralph Engelstad Arena • Grand Forks, ND | Lexie Shaw | L 2–5 | 4–3–1 (3–3–0) |
| October 28 | #10 Bemidji State | | Ralph Engelstad Arena • Grand Forks, ND | Lexie Shaw | W 5–2 | 5–3–1 (4–3–0) |
| October 29 | at #10 Bemidji State | | Sanford Center • Bemidji, MN | Lexie Shaw | W 2–0 | 6–3–1 (5–3–0) |
| November 12 | #3 Minnesota-Duluth | #9 | Ralph Engelstad Arena • Grand Forks, ND | Lexie Shaw | L 1–2 | 6–4–1 (5–4–0) |
| November 13 | #3 Minnesota-Duluth | #9 | Ralph Engelstad Arena • Grand Forks, ND | Lexie Shaw | T 2–2 ^{OT} | 6–4–2 (5–4–2) |
| November 18 | #2 Minnesota | #9 | Ralph Engelstad Arena • Grand Forks, ND | Lexie Shaw | T 2–2 ^{OT} | 6–4–3 (5–4–2) |
| November 19 | #2 Minnesota | #9 | Ralph Engelstad Arena • Grand Forks, ND | Lexie Shaw | T 2–2 ^{OT} | 6–4–4 (5–4–3) |
| November 25 | Syracuse* | #7 | Ralph Engelstad Arena • Grand Forks, ND | Lexie Shaw | L 0–3 | 6–5–4 |
| November 26 | Syracuse* | #7 | Ralph Engelstad Arena • Grand Forks, ND | Lexie Shaw | W 3–0 | 7–5–4 |
| December 2 | at Ohio State | #9 | OSU Ice Rink • Columbus, OH | Lexie Shaw | T 1–1 ^{OT} | 7–5–5 (5–4–4) |
| December 3 | at Ohio State | #9 | OSU Ice Rink • Columbus, OH | Lexie Shaw | L 1–2 | 7–6–5 (5–5–4) |
| December 10 | St. Cloud State | #10 | Ralph Engelstad Arena • Grand Forks, ND | Lexie Shaw | W 3–2 | 8–6–5 (6–5–4) |
| December 11 | St. Cloud State | #10 | Ralph Engelstad Arena • Grand Forks, ND | Lexie Shaw | W 4–0 | 9–6–5 (7–5–4) |
| December 16 | at Lindenwood* | #10 | Lindenwood Ice Arena • Wentzville, MO | Lexie Shaw | W 5–0 | 10–6–5 |
| December 17 | at Lindenwood* | #10 | Lindenwood Ice Arena • Wentzville, MO | Lexie Shaw | L 1–4 | 10–7–5 |
| January 13, 2017 | at Minnesota State | | Verizon Wireless Center • Mankato, MN | Lexie Shaw | W 3–2 | 11–7–5 (8–5–4) |
| January 14 | at Minnesota State | | Verizon Wireless Center • Mankato, MN | Kristen Campbell | W 4–0 | 12–7–5 (9–5–4) |
| January 21 | at #1 Wisconsin | | LaBahn Arena • Madison, WI | Lexie Shaw | L 2–3 | 12–8–5 (9–6–4) |
| January 22 | at #1 Wisconsin | | LaBahn Arena • Madison, WI | Kristen Campbell | L 1–2 | 12–9–5 (9–7–4) |
| January 27 | at Bemidji State | | Sanford Center • Bemidji, MN | Lexie Shaw | W 3–1 | 13–9–5 (10–7–4) |
| January 29 | Bemidji State | | Ralph Engelstad Arena • Grand Forks, ND | Lexie Shaw | T 1–1 ^{OT} | 13–9–6 (10–7–5) |
| February 3 | at #2 Minnesota-Duluth | | Amsoil Arena • Duluth, MN | Lexie Shaw | L 0–2 | 13–10–6 (10–8–5) |
| February 4 | at #2 Minnesota-Duluth | | Amsoil Arena • Duluth, MN | Lexie Shaw | L 1–2 | 13–11–6 (10–9–5) |
| February 10 | at #5 Minnesota | | Ridder Arena • Minneapolis, MN | Lexie Shaw | L 2–4 | 13–12–6 (10–10–5) |
| February 11 | at #5 Minnesota | | Ridder Arena • Minneapolis, MN | Kristen Campbell | L 2–6 | 13–13–6 (10–11–5) |
| February 17 | Ohio State | | Ralph Engelstad Arena • Grand Forks, ND | Lexie Shaw | L 2–4 | 13–14–6 (10–12–5) |
| February 18 | Ohio State | | Ralph Engelstad Arena • Grand Forks, ND | Lexie Shaw | W 3–2 | 14–14–6 (11–12–5) |
WCHA Tournament
| February 24 | Ohio State* | | Ralph Engelstad Arena • Grand Forks, ND (Quarterfinal, Game 1) | Lexie Shaw | L 2–3 ^{OT} | 14–15–6 |
| February 25 | Ohio State* | | Ralph Engelstad Arena • Grand Forks, ND (Quarterfinal, Game 2) | Lexie Shaw | W 4–1 | 15–15–6 |
| February 26 | Ohio State* | | Ralph Engelstad Arena • Grand Forks, ND (Quarterfinal, Game 3) | Lexie Shaw | W 2–1 ^{OT} | 16–15–6 |
| February 26 | vs. #1 Wisconsin* | | Ridder Arena • Minneapolis, MN (Semifinal Game) | Lexie Shaw | L 1–2 | 16–16–6 |
*Non-conference game. ^{#}Rankings from USCHO.com Poll.

== Awards and honors ==
- Halli Krzyzaniak, Defense, All-WCHA Second Team
- Ryleigh Houston, Forward, All-WCHA Rookie Team
