= 2016–17 Wisconsin Badgers women's ice hockey season =

WCHA Regular Season Champions WCHA Final Face-Off Champions Defeated Robert Morris 7-0 in Quarterfinal Round to advance to Frozen Four Defeated Boston College 1-0 in Frozen Four National Semifinal, Lost National Championship Game to Clarkson 0-3
- Conference: 1st WCHA
- Home ice: LaBahn Arena

Rankings
- USA Today/USA Hockey Magazine: 2nd
- USCHO.com: 2nd

Record
- Overall: 33-3-4
- Home: 16-1-2
- Road: 14-1-2
- Neutral: 3-1-0

Coaches and captains
- Head coach: Mark Johnson
- Assistant coaches: Dan Koch; Jackie Crum; Mark Greenhalgh
- Captain: Sydney McKibbon
- Alternate captain(s): Ann-Renée Desbiens; Sarah Nurse; Jenny Ryan

The Wisconsin Badgers represented the University of Wisconsin in WCHA women's ice hockey during the 2016-17 NCAA Division I women's ice hockey season. The Badgers appeared in the NCAA Championship Game, losing to the Clarkson Golden Knights 0–3.

== Offseason ==
=== Recruiting ===
Player	Position	Nationality	Notes
Alyson Baldwin	Goaltender	United States	Hails from Richmond, Texas
Presley Norby	Defense	United States	Played high school hockey in Minnesota
Maddie Rowe	Forward	United States	From River Falls, Wisconsin
Alexis Mauermann	Forward	United States	Stands 5 ft 2 in (157 cm)
Nikki Cece	Goaltender	Canada	Competed in the PWHL

== Roster ==
=== 2016–17 Badgers ===
No.	Nat.	Player	Class	Pos	Height	DoB	Hometown	Previous team
1		Alyson Baldwin	Freshman	G	5' 1" (1.55 m)		Richmond, Texas	Connecticut Southern Stars
2		Mellissa Channell	Senior	D	5' 4" (1.63 m)		Oakville, Ontario	Team Canada U18
3		Mikaela Gardner	Sophomore	D	5' 8" (1.73 m)		Plainfield, Illinois	Team USA U18
5		Jenny Ryan (A)	Senior	D	5' 4" (1.63 m)		Victor, New York	Team USA U18
6		Presley Norby	Freshman	F	5' 5" (1.65 m)		Minnetonka, Minnesota	Team USA U18
7		Sam Cogan	Sophomore	F	5' 8" (1.73 m)		Ottawa, Ontario	Team Canada U18
8		Maddie Rowe	Freshman	D	5' 11" (1.8 m)		River Falls, Wisconsin	Minnesota Blades
10		Mikayla Johnson	Senior (RS)	F	5' 7" (1.7 m)		Madison, Wisconsin	Madison Capitols U19
11		Sydney McKibbon (C)	Senior	F	5' 5" (1.65 m)		Oakville, Ontario	Team Canada U18
12		Sophia Shaver	Sophomore	F	5' 10" (1.78 m)		Wayzata, Minnesota	Team USA U18
13		Maddie Rolfes	Junior	D	5' 8" (1.73 m)		West Des Moines, Iowa	Team USA U18
14		Alexis Mauermann	Freshman	F	5' 2" (1.57 m)		Janesville, Wisconsin	Team USA U18
16		Sarah Nurse (A)	Senior	F	5' 8" (1.73 m)		Hamilton, Ontario	Stoney Creek Jr. Sabres
17		Lauren Williams	Junior	D	5' 9" (1.75 m)		Windsor, Ontario	Team Ontario Blue U18
18		Abby Roque	Freshman	D	5' 7" (1.7 m)		Sault Ste. Marie, Michigan	Team USA U18
19		Annie Pankowski	Junior	F	5' 9" (1.75 m)		Laguna Hills, California	Irondale HS
21		Baylee Wellhausen	Junior	F	5' 4" (1.63 m)		Williams Bay, Wisconsin	Shattuck St. Mary's
22		Mekenzie Steffen	Freshman	D	5' 6" (1.68 m)		Centerville, Minnesota	Team USA U18
24		Claudia Kepler	Junior (RS)	F	5' 4" (1.63 m)		Verona, Wisconsin	Ohio State
26		Emily Clark	Junior	F	5' 7" (1.7 m)		Saskatoon, Saskatchewan	Okanagan Hockey Academy
29		Nikki Cece	Freshman	F	5' 7" (1.7 m)		Oakville, Ontario	Oakville Jr. Hornets
30		Ann-Renée Desbiens (A)	Senior	G	5' 9" (1.75 m)		La Malbaie, Quebec	Team Canada U22
35		Nali Mullen	Junior (RS)	G	5' 4" (1.63 m)		Hudson, Wisconsin	Hudson HS

== Regular season ==
=== News and notes ===
On Sunday, November 6, 2016, Ann-Renee Desbiens broke Noora Raty’s for most NCAA career shutout records. In a 6-0 shutout victory against the Bemidji State Beavers, Desbiens would log career shutout number 44.

== 2016-17 Schedule ==
Date	Opponent^{#}	Rank^{#}	Site	Decision	Result	Record
Regular Season
September 23	at St. Cloud State	#1	Herb Brooks National Hockey Center • St. Cloud, MN	Ann-Renée Desbiens	W 6–0	1–0–0 (1–0–0)
September 24	at St. Cloud State	#1	Herb Brooks National Hockey Center • St. Cloud, MN	Ann-Renée Desbiens	W 4–2	2–0–0 (2–0–0)
October 7	Ohio State	#1	LaBahn Arena • Madison, WI	Ann-Renée Desbiens	W 3–0	3–0–0 (3–0–0)
October 8	Ohio State	#1	LaBahn Arena • Madison, WI	Ann-Renée Desbiens	T 1–1 ^{OT}	3–0–1 (3–0–1)
October 14	at #7 Clarkson*	#1	Cheel Arena • Potsdam, NY	Ann-Renée Desbiens	W 3–2 ^{OT}	4–0–1
October 15	at #7 Clarkson*	#1	Cheel Arena • Potsdam, NY	Ann-Renée Desbiens	W 4–1	5–0–1
October 22	at #9 North Dakota	#1	Ralph Engelstad Arena • Grand Forks, ND	Ann-Renée Desbiens	W 2–0	6–0–1 (4–0–1)
October 23	at #9 North Dakota	#1	Ralph Engelstad Arena • Grand Forks, ND	Ann-Renée Desbiens	W 5–2	7–0–1 (5–0–1)
October 28	at Minnesota State	#1	Verizon Wireless Center • Mankato, MN	Ann-Renée Desbiens	W 3–0	8–0–1 (6–0–1)
October 29	at Minnesota State	#1	Verizon Wireless Center • Mankato, MN	Ann-Renée Desbiens	W 3–1	9–0–1 (7–0–1)
November 5	Bemidji State	#1	LaBahn Arena • Madison, WI	Ann-Renée Desbiens	W 5–0	10–0–1 (8–0–1)
November 6	Bemidji State	#1	LaBahn Arena • Madison, WI	Ann-Renée Desbiens	W 6–0	11–0–1 (9–0–1)
November 18	at #4 Minnesota-Duluth	#1	Amsoil Arena • Duluth, MN	Nikki Cece	L 1–4	11–1–1 (9–1–1)
November 19	at #4 Minnesota-Duluth	#1	Amsoil Arena • Duluth, MN	Nikki Cece	W 4–1	12–1–1 (10–1–1)
November 25	Cornell*	#1	LaBahn Arena • Madison, WI	Nikki Cece	W 3–0	13–1–1
November 26	Cornell*	#1	LaBahn Arena • Madison, WI	Nikki Cece	W 5–2	14–1–1
December 3	#2 Minnesota	#1	LaBahn Arena • Madison, WI	Ann-Renée Desbiens	L 0–2	14–2–1 (10–2–1)
December 4	#2 Minnesota	#1	LaBahn Arena • Madison, WI	Ann-Renée Desbiens	W 8–2	15–2–1 (11–2–1)
December 9	at Ohio State	#1	OSU Ice Rink • Columbus, OH	Ann-Renée Desbiens	W 7–0	16–2–1 (12–2–1)
December 10	at Ohio State	#1	OSU Ice Rink • Columbus, OH	Ann-Renée Desbiens	W 5–0	17–2–1 (13–2–1)
January 6, 2017	at Lindenwood*	#1	Lindenwood Ice Arena • Wentzville, MO	Nikki Cece	W 5–1	18–2–1
January 13	St. Cloud State	#1	LaBahn Arena • Madison, WI	Ann-Renée Desbiens	W 9–0	19–2–1 (14–2–1)
January 14	St. Cloud State	#1	Kohl Center • Madison, WI	Ann-Renée Desbiens	W 2–0	20–2–1 (15–2–1)
January 21	North Dakota	#1	LaBahn Arena • Madison, WI	Ann-Renée Desbiens	W 3–2	21–2–1 (16–2–1)
January 22	North Dakota	#1	LaBahn Arena • Madison, WI	Ann-Renée Desbiens	W 2–1	22–2–1 (17–2–1)
January 27	Minnesota State	#1	LaBahn Arena • Madison, WI	Ann-Renée Desbiens	W 5–0	23–2–1 (18–2–1)
January 28	Minnesota State	#1	LaBahn Arena • Madison, WI	Ann-Renée Desbiens	W 6–1	24–2–1 (19–2–1)
February 3	at Bemidji State	#1	Sanford Center • Bemidji, MN	Ann-Renée Desbiens	W 6–1	25–2–1 (20–2–1)
February 4	at Bemidji State	#1	Sanford Center • Bemidji, MN	Ann-Renée Desbiens	W 4–2	26–2–1 (21–2–1)
February 11	#2 Minnesota-Duluth	#1	LaBahn Arena • Madison, WI	Ann-Renée Desbiens	T 1–1	26–2–2 (21–2–2)
February 12	#2 Minnesota-Duluth	#1	LaBahn Arena • Madison, WI	Ann-Renée Desbiens	W 8–0	27–2–2 (22–2–2)
February 18	at #4 Minnesota	#1	Ridder Arena • Minneapolis, MN	Ann-Renée Desbiens	T 1–1 ^{OT}	27–2–3 (22–2–3)
February 19	at #4 Minnesota	#1	Ridder Arena • Minneapolis, MN	Ann-Renée Desbiens	T 0–0 ^{OT}	27–2–4 (22–2–4)
WCHA Tournament
February 24	Minnesota State*	#1	LaBahn Arena • Madison, WI (Quarterfinals, Game 1)	Ann-Renée Desbiens	W 7–0	28–2–4
February 25	Minnesota State*	#1	LaBahn Arena • Madison, WI (Quarterfinals, Game 2)	Ann-Renée Desbiens	W 6–0	29–2–4
March 4	vs. North Dakota*	#1	Ridder Arena • Minneapolis, MN (Final Face-Off Semifinal Game)	Ann-Renée Desbiens	W 2–1	30–2–4
March 5	vs. #2 Minnesota-Duluth*	#1	Ridder Arena • Minneapolis, MN (Final Face-Off Championship Game)	Ann-Renée Desbiens	W 4–1	31–2–4
NCAA Tournament
March 11	#8 Robert Morris*	#1	LaBahn Arena • Madison, WI (Quarterfinal Game)	Ann-Renée Desbiens	W 7–0	32–2–4
March 17	vs. #4 Boston College*	#1	Family Arena • St. Charles, MO (Frozen Four National Semifinal)	Ann-Renée Desbiens	W 1–0	33–2–4
March 19	vs. #2 Clarkson*	#1	Family Arena • St. Charles, MO (National Championship)	Ann-Renée Desbiens	L 0–3	33–3–4
*Non-conference game. ^{#}Rankings from USCHO.com Poll.

== Home attendance ==
Wisconsin led all NCAA Division I women's ice hockey programs in both average and total home attendance, averaging 2,911 spectators and totaling 55,315 spectators.

The 15,359 spectators at the January 14 home game against St. Cloud State at the Kohl Center set a new record for single-game attendance in NCAA Division I women's ice hockey, surpassing the previous record of 13,573 spectators that had been set the by Wisconsin's February 15, 2014 home game against Minnesota at the same venue.

== Awards and honors ==
- Emily Clark, WCHA Player of the Month (December 2016)
- Ann-Renee Desbiens, WCHA Offensive Player of the Month, January 2017
- Ann-Renée Desbiens, WCHA Defensive Player of the Week (Week of February 14, 2017)
- Alexis Mauermann, WCHA Rookie of the Week (Week of January 31, 2017)
- Abby Roque, WCHA Rookie of the Week (Week of February 7, 2017)
- Abby Roque, WCHA Rookie of the Week (Week of February 14, 2017)
- Baylee Wellhausen, WCHA Offensive Player of the Week (Week of February 14, 2017)
- Ann-Renée Desbiens - 2017 Patty Kazmaier Award recipient
- Ann-Renée Desbiens - WCHA Goaltending Champion
- Abby Roque, Forward - WCHA Rookie of the Year
- Ann-Renée Desbiens, Goaltender - All-WCHA First Team
- Annie Pankowski, Forward - All-WCHA First Team
- Jenny Ryan, Defense - All-WCHA First Team
- Sarah Nurse, Forward - All-WCHA Second Team
- Emily Clark, Forward - All-WCHA Third Team
- Abby Roque, Forward - All-WCHA Rookie Team
- Mekenzie Steffan, Defense - All-WCHA Rookie Team

=== All-America honors ===
- Sarah Nurse, Second-Team All-American (2016–17)
- Annie Pankowski, Second-Team All-American (2016–17)
- Jenny Ryan, Second-Team All-American (2016–17)
