= 2016–17 Bemidji State Beavers women's ice hockey season =

- Conference: 7th WCHA
- Home ice: Sanford Center

Record
- Overall: 12–20–3
- Home: 4–9–1
- Road: 8–11–2

Coaches and captains
- Head coach: James Scanlan
- Assistant coaches: Amber Fryklund; Shane Veenker
- Captain: Madison Hutchinson
- Alternate captain(s): Carley Esse; Lauren Miller; Brittni Mowat

The Bemidji State Beavers women's ice hockey program represented the Bemidji State University during the 2016-17 NCAA Division I women's ice hockey season.

== Offseason ==
- August 17: Ivana Bilic ('16) signed with the Connecticut Whale of the PHF.

=== Recruiting ===
Player	Position	Nationality	Notes
Lauren Bench	Goaltender	United States	Attended Burnsville (MN) High School
Abby Halluska	Forward	United States	From Delano, Minnesota
Briana Jorde	Defense	United States	Played For Thief River Falls HS
Jacqueline Kaasa	Forward	United States	Played 3 varsity sports at Hill Murray (MN) HS
Haley Mack	Forward	United States	Member of the Minnesota Revolution
Heather Olson	Forward/Defense	United States	Attended Bemidji High School
Kaitlin Radke	Forward	United States	Attended Hastings (MN) High School

=== 2016–17 Beavers ===
No.	Nat.	Player	Class	Pos	Height	DoB	Hometown	Previous team
4		Madison Hutchinson (C)	Senior	D	5' 8" (1.73 m)		Manitou, Manitoba	Pembina Valley Hawks
5		Melissa Hunt	Sophomore	D	5' 6" (1.68 m)		Hartney, Manitoba	Westman Wildcats
6		Reilly Fawcett	Junior	F	5' 4" (1.63 m)		Proctor, Minnesota	Proctor/Hermantown HS
7		Carley Esse (A)	Senior	D	5' 8" (1.73 m)		Cloquet, Minnesota	Cloquet HS
8		Kiki Radke	Freshman	F	5' 3" (1.6 m)		Hastings, Minnesota	Hastings HS
9		Emily Bergland	Sophomore	F	5' 6" (1.68 m)		Thief River Falls, Minnesota	Lincoln HS
12		Jacqueline Kaasa	Freshman	F	5' 3" (1.6 m)		North Hudson, Wisconsin	Hill Murray HS
13		Sylvia Marolt	Sophomore	F	5' 7" (1.7 m)		Thief River Falls, Minnesota	Lincoln HS
14		Lauren Miller (A)	Senior	F	5' 7" (1.7 m)		Brockville, Ontario	Nepean Wildcats
15		Ciscely Nelson	Senior	F	5' 7" (1.7 m)		Roseau, Minnesota	Roseau HS
16		Bailey Wright	Junior	F	5' 6" (1.68 m)		Anchorage, Alaska	Minnesota Duluth (WCHA)
17		Emma Terres	Junior	D	5' 8" (1.73 m)		New Hope, Minnesota	Armstrong-Cooper HS
18		Lisa Laiti	Sophomore	D	5' 8" (1.73 m)		Fairbanks, Alaska	Northern Junior Cyclones
19		Haley Mack	Freshman	F	5' 3" (1.6 m)		East Grand Forks, Minnesota	Minnesota Revolution
20		Heather Olson	Freshman	D	5' 7" (1.7 m)		Bemidji, Minnesota	Bemidji HS
21		Abby Halluska	Freshman	F	5' 9" (1.75 m)		Delano, Minnesota	Buffalo HS
22		Alexis Joyce	Junior	D	5' 4" (1.63 m)		Lakeville, Minnesota	Lakeville North HS
24		Summer Thibodeau	Junior	F	5' 7" (1.7 m)		Maple Grove, Minnesota	Maple Grove HS
25		Alex Bond	Junior	F/D	5' 10" (1.78 m)		Barrie, Ontario	Barrie Jr. Sharks
26		Briana Jorde	Freshman	F/D	5' 10" (1.78 m)		Barrie, Ontario	Barrie Jr. Sharks
27		Natalie Stanwood	Freshman	D	5' 4" (1.63 m)		Thief River Falls, Minnesota	Thief River Falls HS
29		Brittni Mowat (A)	Senior	G	5' 6" (1.68 m)		Glenboro, Manitoba	Pembina Valley Hawks
30		Erin Deters	Junior	G	5' 7" (1.7 m)		Sartell, Minnesota	Sartell/Sauk Rapids HS
33		Mackenzie Bruch	Senior	G	5' 6" (1.68 m)		Barrie, Ontario	Stevenson University
35		Lauren Bench	Freshman (RS)	G	5' 10" (1.78 m)		Eagan, Minnesota	Burnsville HS

== Schedule ==
Date	Opponent^{#}	Rank^{#}	Site	Decision	Result	Record
Regular Season
September 30	at Syracuse*		Tennity Ice Skating Pavilion • Syracuse, NY	Brittni Mowat	W 2–1	1–0–0
October 1	at Syracuse*		Tennity Ice Skating Pavilion • Syracuse, NY	Erin Deters	W 3–0	2–0–0
October 7	Minnesota		Sanford Center • Bemidji, MN	Brittni Mowat	L 1–3	2–1–0 (0–1–0)
October 8	Minnesota		Sanford Center • Bemidji, MN	Brittni Mowat	W 2–0	3–1–0 (1–1–0)
October 14	Ohio State	#8	Sanford Center • Bemidji, MN	Brittni Mowat	L 1–3	3–2–0 (1–2–0)
October 15	Ohio State	#8	Sanford Center • Bemidji, MN	Brittni Mowat	W 4–1	4–2–0 (2–2–0)
October 21	at #4 Minnesota Duluth	#10	AMSOIL Arena • Duluth, MN	Brittni Mowat	L 1–2	4–3–0 (2–3–0)
October 22	at #4 Minnesota Duluth	#10	AMSOIL Arena • Duluth, MN	Brittni Mowat	T 3–3 ^{OT}	4–3–1 (2–3–1)
October 28	at North Dakota	#10	Ralph Engelstad Arena • Grand Forks, ND	Brittni Mowat	L 2–5	4–4–1 (2–4–1)
October 29	North Dakota	#10	Sanford Center • Bemidji, MN	Brittni Mowat	L 0–2	4–5–1 (2–5–1)
November 5	at #1 Wisconsin		LaBahn Arena • Madison, WI	Brittni Mowat	L 0–5	4–6–1 (2–6–1)
November 6	at #1 Wisconsin		LaBahn Arena • Madison, WI	Erin Deters	L 0–6	4–7–1 (2–7–1)
November 18	St. Cloud State		Sanford Center • Bemidji, MN	Brittni Mowat	W 6–2	5–7–1 (3–7–1)
November 19	St. Cloud State		Sanford Center • Bemidji, MN	Brittni Mowat	L 0–3	5–8–1 (3–8–1)
November 26	at #2 Minnesota		Ridder Arena • Minneapolis, MN	Brittni Mowat	L 0–4	5–9–1 (3–9–1)
November 27	at #2 Minnesota		Ridder Arena • Minneapolis, MN	Brittni Mowat	L 1–4	5–10–1 (3–10–1)
December 2	at Minnesota State		Verizon Wireless Center • Mankato, MN	Brittni Mowat	W 2–0	6–10–1 (4–10–1)
December 3	at Minnesota State		Verizon Wireless Center • Mankato, MN	Brittni Mowat	L 2–3	6–11–1 (4–11–1)
December 9	at RIT*		Gene Polisseni Center • Rochester, NY	Brittni Mowat	W 3–1	7–11–1
December 9	at RIT*		Gene Polisseni Center • Rochester, NY	Brittni Mowat	W 5–1	8–11–1
January 13, 2017	at Ohio State		OSU Ice Rink • Columbus, OH	Brittni Mowat	L 1–2	8–12–1 (4–12–1)
January 14	at Ohio State		OSU Ice Rink • Columbus, OH	Brittni Mowat	W 3–1	9–12–1 (5–12–1)
January 20	#2 Minnesota Duluth		Sanford Center • Bemidji, MN	Brittni Mowat	L 1–5	9–13–1 (5–13–1)
January 21	#2 Minnesota Duluth		Sanford Center • Bemidji, MN	Brittni Mowat	T 2–2 ^{OT}	9–13–2 (5–13–2)
January 27	North Dakota		Sanford Center • Bemidji, MN	Brittni Mowat	L 1–3	9–14–2 (5–14–2)
January 29	at North Dakota		Ralph Engelstad Arena • Grand Forks, ND	Brittni Mowat	T 1–1 ^{OT}	9–14–3 (5–14–3)
February 3	#1 Wisconsin		Sanford Center • Bemidji, MN	Brittni Mowat	L 1–6	9–15–3 (5–15–3)
February 4	#1 Wisconsin		Sanford Center • Bemidji, MN	Brittni Mowat	L 2–4	9–16–3 (5–16–3)
February 10	at St. Cloud State		Herb Brooks National Hockey Center • St. Cloud, MN	Brittni Mowat	L 2–5	9–17–3 (5–17–3)
February 11	at St. Cloud State		Herb Brooks National Hockey Center • St. Cloud, MN	Brittni Mowat	W 3–1	10–17–3 (6–17–3)
February 17	Minnesota State		Sanford Center • Bemidji, MN	Brittni Mowat	W 6–1	11–17–3 (7–17–3)
February 18	Minnesota State		Sanford Center • Bemidji, MN	Brittni Mowat	L 1–3	11–18–3 (7–18–3)
WCHA Tournament
February 24	#4 Minnesota		Ridder Arena • Minneapolis, MN (Quarterfinals, Game 1)	Brittni Mowat	L 1–3	11–19–3
February 25	#4 Minnesota		Ridder Arena • Minneapolis, MN (Quarterfinals, Game 2)	Brittni Mowat	W 2–1	12–19–3
February 26	#4 Minnesota		Ridder Arena • Minneapolis, MN (Quarterfinals, Game 3)	Brittni Mowat	L 2–3	12–20–3
*Non-conference game. ^{#}Rankings from USCHO.com Poll.
