= 2016–17 St. Cloud State Huskies women's ice hockey season =

- Conference: 6th WCHA
- Home ice: Herb Brooks National Hockey Center

Record
- Overall: 9–23–4
- Home: 6–10–2
- Road: 3–12–2
- Neutral: 0–1–0

Coaches and captains
- Head coach: Eric Rud
- Assistant coaches: Steve MacDonald; Jinelle Siergiej
- Captain: Lauren Hespenheide
- Alternate captain(s): Christa Moody; Jenna Redford

The St. Cloud State Huskies women's ice hockey program represented St. Cloud State University during the 2016-17 NCAA Division I women's ice hockey season.

== Recruiting ==
Player	Position	Nationality	Notes
Janine Alder	Goaltender	Switzerland	Bronze Medalist at 2014 Olympics with Team Switzerland
Katie Detert	Forward	United States	Played Club Hockey with Northern Edge
Janna Haeg	Forward	United States	Attended Lakeville South (MN) HS
Rachel Herzog	Defender	United States	Graduate of Hill-Murray (MN) HS
Brooke Kudirka	Forward	United States	Played for St. Louis AAA Blues U19
Dana Rasmussen	Forward	United States	Transfer from Ohio State

== 2016–17 Huskies ==
No.	Nat.	Player	Class	Pos	Height	DoB	Hometown	Previous team
1		Janine Alder	Freshman	G	5' 5" (1.65 m)		Zürich, Switzerland	Swiss National Team
2		Julia Tylke	Sophomore	F	5' 5" (1.65 m)		Delafield, Wisconsin	Chicago Young Americans
4		Dana Rasmussen	Freshman (RS)	F	5' 2" (1.57 m)		Kasson, Minnesota	Ohio State
5		Janna Haeg	Freshman	F	5' 6" (1.68 m)		Lakeville, Minnesota	Lakeville South HS
7		Brittney Anderson	Junior	D	5' 6" (1.68 m)		Hudson, Wisconsin	Hill-Murray HS
8		Brooke Kudirka	Freshman	F	5' 11" (1.8 m)		Omaha, Nebraska	St. Louis AAA Blues U19
9		Lauren Hespenheide (C)	Senior	F	5' 0" (1.52 m)		Shakopee, Minnesota	Shakopee Senior HS
10		Emma Turbyville	Junior	D	5' 10" (1.78 m)		Chicago, Illinois	Shattuck St. Mary's
11		Caroline Markstrom	Senior	D	5' 8" (1.73 m)		Kovland, Sweden	Sundsvalls Gymnasium
13		Katie Detert	Freshman	F	5' 6" (1.68 m)		Rhinelander, Wisconsin	Northern Edge
15		Rachel Herzog	Freshman	D	5' 7" (1.7 m)		Oakdale, Minnesota	Hill-Murray HS
16		Kelsey Saelens	Senior	F	5' 7" (1.7 m)		Winnipeg, Manitoba	Shaftesbury Prep
17		Jenna Redford (A)	Senior (RS)	D	5' 6" (1.68 m)		Soldotna, Alaska	Boston Shamrocks
18		Ivy Dynek	Sophomore	F	5' 8" (1.73 m)		Northfield, Illinois	Chicago Young Americans
19		Payge Pena	Senior	F	5' 7" (1.7 m)		Maple Ridge, British Columbia	Okanagan Hockey Academy
20		Suvi Ollikainen	Sophomore	F	5' 3" (1.6 m)		Klaukkala, Finland	Finnish National Team
21		Christa Moody (A)	Senior	D	5' 9" (1.75 m)		Battle Creek, Michigan	Honeybaked
22		Kayla Friesen	Freshman	F	5' 7" (1.7 m)		Winnipeg, Manitoba	St. Mary's Academy
23		Hannah Potrykus	Sophomore	F	5' 6" (1.68 m)		Brighton, Michigan	USA Hockey Club of Michigan
25		Jordan Stewart	Sophomore	F	5' 5" (1.65 m)		Machesney Park, Illinois	Chicago Young Americans
27		Alyssa Erickson	Junior	F	5' 8" (1.73 m)		Mission, British Columbia	Okanagan Hockey Academy
29		Taylor Crosby	Sophomore	G	5' 6" (1.68 m)		Cole Harbour, Nova Scotia	Shattuck-St. Mary's
34		Madeleine Dahl	Senior	G	5' 7" (1.7 m)		Edina, Minnesota	Union College

== Schedule ==
Date	Opponent^{#}	Rank^{#}	Site	Decision	Result	Record
Regular Season
September 23	#1 Wisconsin		Herb Brooks National Hockey Center • St. Cloud, MN	Madeleine Dahl	L 0–6	0–1–0 (0–1–0)
September 24	#1 Wisconsin		Herb Brooks National Hockey Center • St. Cloud, MN	Taylor Crosby	L 2–4	0–2–0 (0–2–0)
September 30	Merrimack*		Herb Brooks National Hockey Center • St. Cloud, MN	Janine Alder	W 4–2	1–2–0
October 1	Merrimack*		Herb Brooks National Hockey Center • St. Cloud, MN	Taylor Crosby	L 1–4	1–3–0
October 7	#7 North Dakota		Herb Brooks National Hockey Center • St. Cloud, MN	Janine Alder	L 0–1	1–4–0 (0–3–0)
October 8	#7 North Dakota		Herb Brooks National Hockey Center • St. Cloud, MN	Janine Alder	W 3–2	2–4–0 (1–3–0)
October 21	at Minnesota State		Verizon Wireless Center • Mankato, MN	Janine Alder	T 2–2 ^{OT}	2–4–1 (1–3–1)
October 22	at Minnesota State		Verizon Wireless Center • Mankato, MN	Janine Alder	W 2–0	3–4–1 (2–3–1)
October 27	at #2 Minnesota		Ridder Arena • Minneapolis, MN	Janine Alder	L 2–5	3–5–1 (2–4–1)
October 28	at #2 Minnesota		Ridder Arena • Minneapolis, MN	Janine Alder	L 0–3	3–6–1 (2–5–1)
November 11	Ohio State		Herb Brooks National Hockey Center • St. Cloud, MN	Janine Alder	L 0–3	3–7–1 (2–6–1)
November 12	Ohio State		Herb Brooks National Hockey Center • St. Cloud, MN	Janine Alder	W 4–1	4–7–1 (3–6–1)
November 18	at Bemidji State		Sanford Center • Bemidji, MN	Janine Alder	L 2–6	4–8–1 (3–7–1)
November 19	at Bemidji State		Sanford Center • Bemidji, MN	Janine Alder	W 3–0	5–8–1 (4–7–1)
November 25	at Vermont*		Gutterson Fieldhouse • Burlington, VT (Windjammer Classic, Opening Game)	Janine Alder	L 1–5	5–9–1
November 26	vs. Robert Morris*		Gutterson Fieldhouse • Burlington, VT (Windjammer Classic, Consolation Game)	Janine Alder	L 3–5	5–10–1
December 2	#4 Minnesota-Duluth		Herb Brooks National Hockey Center • St. Cloud, MN	Janine Alder	L 0–3	5–11–1 (4–8–1)
December 3	#4 Minnesota-Duluth		Herb Brooks National Hockey Center • St. Cloud, MN	Janine Alder	L 2–3	5–12–1 (4–9–1)
December 10	at #10 North Dakota		Ralph Engelstad Arena • Grand Forks, ND	Janine Alder	L 2–3	5–13–1 (4–10–1)
December 11	at #10 North Dakota		Ralph Engelstad Arena • Grand Forks, ND	Janine Alder	L 0–4	5–14–1 (4–11–1)
January 6, 2017	#7 Colgate*		Herb Brooks National Hockey Center • St. Cloud, MN	Janine Alder	W 7–4	6–14–1
January 7	#7 Colgate*		Herb Brooks National Hockey Center • St. Cloud, MN	Janine Alder	T 0–0 ^{OT}	6–14–2
January 13	at #1 Wisconsin		LaBahn Arena • Madison, WI	Janine Alder	L 0–9	6–15–2 (4–12–1)
January 13	at #1 Wisconsin		LaBahn Arena • Madison, WI	Janine Alder	L 0–2	6–16–2 (4–13–1)
January 20	Minnesota State		Herb Brooks National Hockey Center • St. Cloud, MN	Janine Alder	W 2–1	7–16–2 (5–13–1)
January 21	Minnesota State		Herb Brooks National Hockey Center • St. Cloud, MN	Janine Alder	T 3–3 ^{OT}	7–16–3 (5–13–2)
January 27	#4 Minnesota		Herb Brooks National Hockey Center • St. Cloud, MN	Madeleine Dahl	L 1–2	7–17–3 (5–14–2)
January 28	#4 Minnesota		Herb Brooks National Hockey Center • St. Cloud, MN	Madeleine Dahl	L 0–5	7–18–3 (5–15–2)
February 3	at Ohio State		OSU Ice Rink • Columbus, OH	Janine Alder	W 3–1	8–18–3 (6–15–2)
February 4	at Ohio State		OSU Ice Rink • Columbus, OH	Janine Alder	T 2–2 ^{OT}	8–18–4 (6–15–3)
February 10	Bemidji State		Herb Brooks National Hockey Center • St. Cloud, MN	Janine Alder	W 4–2	9–18–4 (7–15–3)
February 11	Bemidji State		Herb Brooks National Hockey Center • St. Cloud, MN	Janine Alder	L 1–3	9–19–4 (7–16–3)
February 17	at #2 Minnesota-Duluth		Amsoil Arena • Duluth, MN	Janine Alder	L 1–2	9–20–4 (7–17–3)
February 17	at #2 Minnesota-Duluth		Amsoil Arena • Duluth, MN	Janine Alder	L 1–4	9–21–4 (7–18–3)
WCHA Tournament
February 23	at #2 Minnesota-Duluth*		Amsoil Arena • Duluth, MN (Quarterfinals, Game 1)	Janine Alder	L 0–5	9–22–4
February 24	at #2 Minnesota-Duluth*		Amsoil Arena • Duluth, MN (Quarterfinals, Game 1)	Janine Alder	L 2–6	9–23–4
*Non-conference game. ^{#}Rankings from USCHO.com Poll.

== Awards and honors ==
- Janine Alder, Goaltender, WCHA All-Rookie Team
