= 2016–17 Minnesota Golden Gophers women's ice hockey season =

Defeated Minnesota Duluth 1–0 to advance to Frozen Four, Frozen Four Lost National Semifinal Game to Clarkson 3–4
- Conference: WCHA
- Home ice: Ridder Arena

Rankings
- USCHO.com: 4th
- USA Today/USA Hockey Magazine: 4th

Record
- Overall: 26–8–5
- Home: 15–2–3
- Road: 10–5–2
- Neutral: 1–1–0

Coaches and captains
- Head coach: Brad Frost
- Assistant coaches: Joel Johnson; Bethany Brausen
- Captain: Lee Stecklein
- Alternate captain(s): Dani Cameranesi; Kate Schipper

The 2016–17 Minnesota Golden Gophers women's ice hockey season represented the University of Minnesota during the 2016–17 NCAA Division I women's ice hockey season. They were coached by Brad Frost in his tenth season. The defending champions returned to the Frozen Four for the sixth consecutive year by upsetting Minnesota Duluth in the opening game of the NCAA Tournament, before losing to Clarkson in the Frozen Four.

== Offseason ==
=== Recruiting ===
Player	Position	Nationality	Notes
Lindsay Agnew	Forward	Canada	Played for Canada's U18 National Team
Serena D’Angelo	Goaltender	Canada	Competed in the PWHL
Kippin Keller	Forward	United States	Played for Minnetonka High School
Patti Marshall	Defense	United States	Skated with Shattuck-Saint Mary's
Katie Robinson	Defense	United States	Hails from Kasson, Minnesota
Alex Woken	Forward	United States	Skated with Shattuck-Saint Mary's

== Regular season ==
=== Standings ===
2016–17 Western Collegiate Hockey Association standings
	Conference								Overall					
	GP	W	L	T	SW	PTS	GF	GA	GP	W	L	T	GF	GA
#2 Wisconsin*†	28	22	2	4	3	73	110	24	40	33	3	4	157	35
#4 Minnesota	28	19	4	5	3	65	88	46	39	26	8	5	124	69
#5 Minnesota Duluth	28	19	5	4	1	62	82	47	37	25	7	5	110	62
North Dakota	28	11	12	5	3	41	62	57	38	16	16	6	84	73
Ohio State	28	7	16	5	2	28	40	73	37	14	18	5	69	82
St. Cloud State	28	7	18	3	2	26	43	82	36	9	23	4	61	113
Bemidji State	28	7	18	3	1	25	49	80	35	12	20	3	67	90
Minnesota State	28	4	21	3	1	16	33	98	37	7	26	4	45	127
Championship: Wisconsin † indicates conference regular season champion * indicates conference tournament champion Current rankings: USCHO.com Division I women's poll

=== Schedule ===
Date	Time	Opponent^{#}	Rank^{#}	Site	Decision	Result	Attendance	Record
Regular Season
September 30	7:07	Lindenwood*	#2	Ridder Arena • Minneapolis, MN	Peters	W 3–0	1,282	1–0–0
October 1	2:07	Lindenwood*	#2	Ridder Arena • Minneapolis, MN	Peters	W 6–2	1,094	2–0–0
October 7	3:07	at Bemidji State	#2	Sanford Center • Bemidji, MN	Peters	W 3–1	584	3–0–0 (1–0–0)
October 8	3:07	at Bemidji State	#2	Sanford Center • Bemidji, MN	Peters	L 0–2	612	3–1–0 (1–1–0)
October 14	6:07	#4 Minnesota Duluth	#3	Ridder Arena • Minneapolis, MN	Peters	W 4–3	1,861	4–1–0 (2–1–0)
October 15	4:07	#4 Minnesota Duluth	#3	Ridder Arena • Minneapolis, MN	Peters	W 3–2 ^{OT}	1,606	5–1–0 (3–1–0)
October 21	5:00	at Ohio State	#2	The Ohio State University Ice Rink • Columbus, OH	Peters	W 3–2	576	6–1–0 (4–1–0)
October 22	2:00	at Ohio State	#2	The Ohio State University Ice Rink • Columbus, OH	Peters	W 2–1	399	7–1–0 (5–1–0)
October 27	7:07	St. Cloud State	#2	Ridder Arena • Minneapolis, MN	Peters	W 5–2	1,286	8–1–0 (6–1–0)
October 28	7:07	St. Cloud State	#2	Ridder Arena • Minneapolis, MN	Peters	W 3–0	1,396	9–1–0 (7–1–0)
November 4	6:07	Minnesota State	#2	Ridder Arena • Minneapolis, MN	Peters	W 5–0	1,371	10–1–0 (8–1–0)
November 6	2:07	Minnesota State	#2	Ridder Arena • Minneapolis, MN	Peters	W 8–1	1,670	11–1–0 (9–1–0)
November 18	7:00	at #9 North Dakota	#2	Ralph Engelstad Arena • Grand Forks, ND	Peters	T 2–2 ^{OT}	2,360	11–1–1 (9–1–1)
November 19	4:00	at #9 North Dakota	#2	Ralph Engelstad Arena • Grand Forks, ND	Peters	T 2–2 ^{OT}	1,127	11–1–2 (9–1–2)
November 26	2:07	Bemidji State	#2	Ridder Arena • Minneapolis, MN	Peters	W 4–0	2,080	12–1–2 (10–1–2)
November 27	2:07	Bemidji State	#2	Ridder Arena • Minneapolis, MN	Peters	W 4–1	1,984	13–1–2 (11–1–2)
December 3	3:30	at #1 Wisconsin	#2	LaBahn Arena • Madison, WI	Peters	W 2–0	2,273	14–1–2 (12–1–2)
December 4	2:00	at #1 Wisconsin	#2	LaBahn Arena • Madison, WI	Peters	L 2–8	2,273	14–2–2 (12–2–2)
December 9	6:00	at Boston University*	#2	Walter Brown Arena • Boston, MA	Peters	W 5–1	623	15–2–2
December 10	2:00	at Boston University*	#2	Walter Brown Arena • Boston, MA	Peters	L 5–6 ^{OT}	353	15–3–2
January 8, 2017	3:00	vs. Minnesota State*	#2	Braemer Arena • Edina, MN (Women's Face-Off Classic)	Peters	W 5–3	1,308	16–3–2
January 13	3:07	at #4 Minnesota Duluth	#2	AMSOIL Arena • Duluth, MN	Peters	L 2–3	1,710	16–4–2 (12–3–2)
January 14	3:07	at #4 Minnesota Duluth	#2	AMSOIL Arena • Duluth, MN	Peters	L 3–5	2,024	16–5–2 (12–4–2)
January 20	7:07	Ohio State	#4	Ridder Arena • Minneapolis, MN	May	W 2–1	2,374	17–5–2 (13–4–2)
January 21	2:07	Ohio State	#4	Ridder Arena • Minneapolis, MN	May	T 1–1 ^{OT}	2,793	17–5–3 (13–4–3)
January 27	7:07	at St. Cloud State	#4	Herb Brooks National Hockey Center • St. Cloud, MN	Peters	W 2–1	217	18–5–3 (14–4–3)
January 28	3:07	at St. Cloud State	#4	Herb Brooks National Hockey Center • St. Cloud, MN	Peters	W 5–0	399	19–5–3 (15–4–3)
February 3	7:07	at Minnesota State	#4	Verizon Wireless Center • Mankato, MN	Peters	W 5–0	236	20–5–3 (16–4–3)
February 4	3:07	at Minnesota State	#4	Verizon Wireless Center • Mankato, MN	Peters	W 5–3	480	21–5–3 (17–4–3)
February 10	7:07	North Dakota	#5	Ridder Arena • Minneapolis, MN	Peters	W 4–3	2,458	22–5–3 (18–4–3)
February 11	4:07	North Dakota	#5	Ridder Arena • Minneapolis, MN	Peters	W 6–2	2,733	23–5–3 (19–4–3)
February 18	3:07	#1 Wisconsin	#4	Ridder Arena • Minneapolis, MN	Peters	T 1–1 ^{OT}	3,498	23–5–4 (19–4–4)
February 18	3:03	#1 Wisconsin	#4	Ridder Arena • Minneapolis, MN	Peters	T 0–0 ^{OT}	3,129	23–5–5 (19–4–5)
WCHA Tournament
February 24	6:07	Bemidji State*	#5	Ridder Arena • Minneapolis, MN (Quarterfinals, Game 1)	Peters	W 3–1	1,234	24–5–5
February 25	4:07	Bemidji State*	#5	Ridder Arena • Minneapolis, MN (Quarterfinals, Game 2)	Peters	L 1–2	1,483	24–6–5
February 26	4:07	Bemidji State*	#5	Ridder Arena • Minneapolis, MN (Quarterfinals, Game 3)	Peters	W 3–2	1,194	25–6–5
March 4	5:07	#2 Minnesota Duluth*	#5	Ridder Arena • Minneapolis, MN (Semifinals, Final Face-Off)	Peters	L 1–2 ^{2OT}	2,533	25–7–5
NCAA Tournament
March 11	2:30	at #3 Minnesota Duluth*	#5	AMSOIL Arena • Duluth, MN (Quarterfinals)	Peters	W 1–0	1,549	26–7–5
March 17	8:00	vs. #2 Clarkson*	#5	Family Arena • St. Charles, MO (Semifinals Frozen Four)	Peters	L 3–4	2,762	26–8–5
*Non-conference game. ^{#}Rankings from USCHO.com Poll.

=== Roster ===
No.	Nat.	Player	Class	Pos	Height	DoB	Hometown	Previous team
2		Lee Stecklein (C)	Senior (RS)	D	6' 0" (1.83 m)	1994-04-23	Roseville, Minnesota	Roseville Area High School
3		Anna Barlow	Sophomore	D	5' 6" (1.68 m)	1996-09-02	South St. Paul, Minnesota	South St. Paul Secondary
4		Tianna Gunderson	Sophomore	F	5' 6" (1.68 m)	1996-08-27	Roseau, Minnesota	Roseau High School
5		Sophie Skarzynski	Sophomore	D	5' 8" (1.73 m)	1997-09-18	Lake Forest, Illinois	Loyola Academy
6		Kate Schipper (A)	Senior	F	5' 4" (1.63 m)	1995-06-28	Brooklyn Park, Minnesota	Breck School
7		Taylor Williamson	Sophomore	F	5' 7" (1.7 m)	1996-08-20	Edina, Minnesota	Edina High School
8		Kippin Keller	Freshman	F	5' 4" (1.63 m)	1997-12-16	Minnetonka, Minnesota	Minnetonka High School
9		Sydney Baldwin	Junior	D	5' 7" (1.7 m)	1996-01-15	Minnetonka, Minnesota	Minnetonka High School
10		Cara Piazza	Junior	F	5' 7" (1.7 m)	1995-10-09	Darien, Illinois	Downers Grove South High School
11		Kelsey Cline	Senior	D/F	5' 6" (1.68 m)	1995-02-28	Bloomington, Minnesota	Bloomington Jefferson High School
12		Megan Wolfe	Senior	D/F	5' 8" (1.73 m)	1995-06-08	Eagan, Minnesota	Eagan High School
14		Lindsay Agnew	Freshman	F	5' 7" (1.7 m)	1998-03-09	Oakville, Ontario	King's Christian Collegiate
15		Paige Haley	Senior	D/F	5' 9" (1.75 m)	1995-07-21	Red Wing, Minnesota	Red Wing High School
17		Sierra Smith	Sophomore	F	5' 8" (1.73 m)	1996-09-02	Stillwater, Minnesota	Stillwater Area High School
18		Katie Robinson	Freshman	D	5' 10" (1.78 m)	1997-10-08	Kasson, Minnesota	Kasson-Mantorville High School
19		Kelly Pannek	Junior	F	5' 8" (1.73 m)	1995-12-29	Plymouth, Minnesota	Benilde-St. Margaret's
20		Alex Woken	Freshman	F	5' 8" (1.73 m)	1998-02-25	Fargo, North Dakota	Shattuck-Saint Mary's
21		Dani Cameranesi (A)	Senior	F	5' 5" (1.65 m)	1995-06-30	Plymouth, Minnesota	Blake School
23		Caitlin Reilly	Junior	F	5' 5" (1.65 m)	1995-09-05	Chanhassen, Minnesota	Benilde-St. Margaret's
25		Nicole Schammel	Sophomore (RS)	F	5' 5" (1.65 m)	1996-04-09	Red Wing, Minnesota	Red Wing High School
26		Sarah Potomak	Sophomore	F	5' 5" (1.65 m)	1996-04-08	Aldergrove, British Columbia	George Eliot Secondary
27		Patti Marshall	Freshman	D	5' 7" (1.7 m)	1998-05-11	Thief River Falls, MN	Shattuck-St. Mary's
30		Serena D'Angelo	Freshman	G	5' 4" (1.63 m)	1998-04-02	Stoney Creek, Ontario	Blyth Academy
31		Emma May	Sophomore	G	5' 6" (1.68 m)	1996-10-21	Eagan, Minnesota	Eagan High School
37		Sidney Peters	Junior (RS)	G	5' 10" (1.78 m)	1995-02-26	Geneva, Illinois	North American Hockey Academy

== News and notes ==
- January 8, 2017: The Golden Gophers competed in the United States Hockey Hall of Fame Game against the MSU-Mankato Mavericks. The Golden Gophers prevailed by a 5–3 score.

== Awards and honors ==
=== WCHA Weekly Honors ===
- Lee Stecklein, WCHA Defensive Player of the Week (Week of January 31, 2017)
- Kate Schipper, WCHA Offensive Player of the Week (Week of February 7, 2017)

=== Year End Awards ===
- Kelly Pannek, Forward, Nations leading scorer (tied with Cayley Mercer, Clarkson), 19G, 43A, 62 Points
- Kelly Pannek, Patty Kazmaier Award Top Ten Finalist
- Sarah Potomak, Patty Kazmaier Award Top Ten Finalist
- Kelly Pannek, Forward, All-WCHA First Team
- Lee Stecklein, Defense, All-WCHA First Team
- Sarah Potomak, Forward, All-WCHA Second Team
- Dani Cameranesi, Forward, All-WCHA Third Team
- Megan Wolfe, Defense, All-WCHA Third Team

=== All-America honors ===
- Kelly Pannek, 2016–17 AHCA-CCM Women's University Division I First-Team All-American
- Lee Stecklein, 2016–17 AHCA-CCM Women's University Division I First-Team All-American
