= 2016–17 Minnesota Duluth Bulldogs women's ice hockey season =

- Conference: 3rd WCHA
- Home ice: Amsoil Arena

Rankings
- USA Today/USA Hockey Magazine: 5th
- USCHO.com: 5th

Record
- Overall: 25–7–5
- Home: 15–1–2
- Road: 10–4–3
- Neutral: 0–2–0

Coaches and captains
- Head coach: Maura Crowell
- Assistant coaches: Laura Bellamy; Chris Connoly
- Captain: Ashleigh Brykaliuk
- Alternate captain: Sidney Morin

The Minnesota Duluth Bulldogs represented the University of Minnesota Duluth in WCHA women's ice hockey during the 2016-17 NCAA Division I women's ice hockey season. The Bulldogs emerged as one of the best teams in the nation.

== Offseason ==
- June 18: Ashleigh Brykaliuk and Lara Stalder were both chosen by the Boston Pride during the NWHL draft. Brykaliuk was the 12th player selected, and Stalder was the 20th.

=== Recruiting ===
Player	Position	Nationality	Notes
Sydney Brodt	Forward	United States	Member of Team USA U18
Jalyn Elmes	Defense	Canada	Played with Team Canada U18
Catherine Johnson	Goaltender	United States	Attended St. Paul United (MN) HS
Lauren Niska	Defense	United States	Attended Alexandria Area (MN) High School
Brooklynn Schugel	Forward	United States	Played for New Ulm High School

=== 2016–17 Bulldogs ===
No.	Nat.	Player	Class	Pos	Height	DoB	Hometown	Previous team
4		Lauren Niska	Freshman	D	5' 4" (1.63 m)		Alexandria, Minnesota	Alexandria Area HS
5		Sidney Morin (A)	Senior	D	5' 5" (1.65 m)		Minnetonka, Minnesota	Team USA U-18
7		Morgan Morse	Sophomore	F	5' 4" (1.63 m)		Lakeville, Minnesota	Lakeville South HS
11		Brooklynn Schugel	Freshman	F	5' 7" (1.7 m)		New Ulm, Minnesota	New Ulm HS
12		Catherine Daoust	Junior	D	5' 5" (1.65 m)		L'Île-Bizard, Quebec	Team Canada U-18
13		Ashleigh Brykaliuk (C)	Senior	F	5' 7" (1.7 m)		Brandon, Manitoba	Team Canada U-18
14		Sydney Brodt	Freshman	F	5' 6" (1.68 m)		North Oaks, Minnesota	Team USA U-18
15		Reagan Haley	Sophomore	F	5' 7" (1.7 m)		Red Wing, Minnesota	Team USA U-18
17		Katherine McGovern	Senior	F	5' 4" (1.63 m)		Scottsdale, Arizona	Dallas Stars U-19
20		Jalyn Elmes	Freshman	D	5' 9" (1.75 m)		Brandon, Manitoba	LTeam Canada U18
21		Lara Stalder	Senior	F	5' 6" (1.68 m)		Lucerne, Switzerland	Swiss National Team
22		Emma Yanko	Sophomore	F	5' 5" (1.65 m)		Saskatoon, Saskatchewan	Team Saskatchewan
23		Shelby Brossart	Sophomore	D	5' 9" (1.75 m)		Grand Forks, North Dakota	Minnesota Revolution
28		Demi Crossman	Senior	F	5' 7" (1.7 m)		Livonia, Michigan	Team USA U-18
29		Lynn Astrup	Junior	D	5' 7" (1.7 m)		Warroad, Minnesota	Warroad HS
31		Catherine Johnson	Freshman	G	5' 6" (1.68 m)		Lakeville, Minnesota	St. Paul United
35		Maddie Rooney	Sophomore	G	5' 6" (1.68 m)		Andover, Minnesota	Team USA U-18
47		Jessica Healey	Junior	D	5' 3" (1.6 m)		Edmonton Alberta	Team Canada U-18
66		Maria Lindh	Junior	F	5' 9" (1.75 m)		Stockholm, Sweden	Team Sweden
67		Michelle Lowenhielm	Junior	F	5' 8" (1.73 m)		Sollentuna, Sweden	Swedish National Team
95		Linnea Hedin	Junior	D	5' 3" (1.6 m)		Huddinge, Sweden	Team Sweden
98		Katerina Mrázová	Junior (RS)	F	5' 5" (1.65 m)		Prague, Czech Republic	Boston Blades

== Schedule ==
Date	Opponent^{#}	Rank^{#}	Site	Decision	Result	Record
Regular Season
September 30	#3 Boston College*		Amsoil Arena • Duluth, MN	Maddie Rooney	T 3–3 ^{OT}	0–0–1
October 1	#3 Boston College*		Amsoil Arena • Duluth, MN	Maddie Rooney	W 5–2	1–0–1
October 7	Minnesota State	#6	Amsoil Arena • Duluth, MN	Maddie Rooney	W 4–0	2–0–1 (1–0–0)
October 8	Minnesota State	#6	Amsoil Arena • Duluth, MN	Maddie Rooney	W 5–1	3–0–1 (2–0–0)
October 14	at #3 Minnesota	#4	Ridder Arena • Minneapolis, MN	Maddie Rooney	L 3–4	3–1–1 (2–1–0)
October 15	at #3 Minnesota	#4	Ridder Arena • Minneapolis, MN	Maddie Rooney	L 2–3 ^{OT}	3–2–1 (2–2–0)
October 21	#10 Bemidji State	#4	Amsoil Arena • Duluth, MN	Maddie Rooney	W 2–1	4–2–1 (3–2–0)
October 22	#10 Bemidji State	#4	Amsoil Arena • Duluth, MN	Maddie Rooney	T 3–3 ^{OT}	4–2–2 (3–2–1)
October 28	at Ohio State	#3	OSU Ice Rink • Columbus, OH	Maddie Rooney	W 6–0	5–2–2 (4–2–1)
October 29	at Ohio State	#3	OSU Ice Rink • Columbus, OH	Maddie Rooney	W 3–2	6–2–2 (5–2–1)
November 12	at #9 North Dakota	#3	Ralph Engelstad Arena • Grand Forks, ND	Maddie Rooney	W 2–1	7–2–2 (6–2–1)
November 13	at #9 North Dakota	#3	Ralph Engelstad Arena • Grand Forks, ND	Maddie Rooney	T 2–2 ^{OT}	7–2–3 (6–2–2)
November 18	#1 Wisconsin	#3	Amsoil Arena • Duluth, MN	Maddie Rooney	W 4–1	8–2–3 (7–2–2)
November 19	#1 Wisconsin	#3	Amsoil Arena • Duluth, MN	Maddie Rooney	L 1–4	8–3–3 (7–3–2)
November 25	at Harvard*	#4	Bright-Landry Hockey Center • Allston, MA	Maddie Rooney	W 4–1	9–3–3
November 26	at Harvard*	#4	Bright-Landry Hockey Center • Allston, MA	Maddie Rooney	W 2–1 ^{OT}	10–3–3
December 2	at St. Cloud State	#4	Herb Brooks National Hockey Center • St. Cloud, MN	Maddie Rooney	W 3–0	11–3–3 (8–3–2)
December 3	at St. Cloud State	#4	Herb Brooks National Hockey Center • St. Cloud, MN	Maddie Rooney	W 3–2	12–3–3 (9–3–2)
December 9	at Minnesota State	#3	Verizon Wireless Center • Mankato, MN	Maddie Rooney	W 3–0	13–3–3 (10–3–2)
December 10	at Minnesota State	#3	Verizon Wireless Center • Mankato, MN	Maddie Rooney	L 1–2	13–4–3 (10–4–2)
January 13, 2017	#2 Minnesota	#4	Amsoil Arena • Duluth, MN	Maddie Rooney	W 3–2	14–4–3 (11–4–2)
January 14	#2 Minnesota	#4	Amsoil Arena • Duluth, MN	Maddie Rooney	W 5–3	15–4–3 (12–4–2)
January 20	at Bemidji State	#2	Sanford Center • Bemidji, MN	Maddie Rooney	W 5–1	16–4–3 (13–4–2)
January 21	at Bemidji State	#2	Sanford Center • Bemidji, MN	Maddie Rooney	T 2–2 ^{OT}	16–4–4 (13–4–3)
January 27	Ohio State	#2	Amsoil Arena • Duluth, MN	Maddie Rooney	W 6–1	17–4–4 (14–4–3)
January 28	Ohio State	#2	Amsoil Arena • Duluth, MN	Maddie Rooney	W 3–0	18–4–4 (15–4–3)
February 3	North Dakota	#2	Amsoil Arena • Duluth, MN	Maddie Rooney	W 2–0	19–4–4 (16–4–3)
February 4	North Dakota	#2	Amsoil Arena • Duluth, MN	Maddie Rooney	W 2–1	20–4–4 (17–4–3)
February 11	at Wisconsin	#2	LaBahn Arena • Madison, WI	Maddie Rooney	T 1–1 ^{OT}	20–4–5 (17–4–4)
February 12	at #1 Wisconsin	#2	LaBahn Arena • Madison, WI	Maddie Rooney	L 0–8	20–5–5 (17–5–4)
February 12	at #1 Wisconsin	#2	LaBahn Arena • Madison, WI	Maddie Rooney	L 0–8	20–5–5 (17–5–4)
February 17	St. Cloud State	#2	Amsoil Arena • Duluth, MN	Maddie Rooney	W 2–1	21–5–5 (18–5–4)
February 18	St. Cloud State	#2	Amsoil Arena • Duluth, MN	Maddie Rooney	W 4–1	22–5–5 (19–5–4)
WCHA Tournament
February 23	St. Cloud State*	#2	Amsoil Arena • Duluth, MN (Quarterfinals, Game 1)	Maddie Rooney	W 5–0	23–5–5
February 24	St. Cloud State*	#2	Amsoil Arena • Duluth, MN (Quarterfinals, Game 2)	Maddie Rooney	W 6–2	24–5–5
March 4	at #5 Minnesota*	#2	Ridder Arena • Minneapolis, MN (Semifinal Game WCHA Final Face-Off)	Maddie Rooney	W 2–1 ^{2 OT}	25–5–5
March 5	vs. #1 Wisconsin*	#2	Ridder Arena • Minneapolis, MN (Championship Game WCHA Final Face-Off)	Maddie Rooney	L 1–4	25–6–5
NCAA Tournament
March 11	#5 Minnesota*	#3	Amsoil Arena • Duluth, MN (Quarterfinal Game)	Maddie Rooney	L 0–1	25–7–5
*Non-conference game. ^{#}Rankings from USCHO.com Poll.

== Awards and honors ==
- Lara Stalder, 2016-17 AHCA-CCM Women's University Division I First-Team All-American
- Lara Stalder
  Patty Kazmaier Award Top-Three finalist
- Maura Crowell
  AHCA Coach of the Year
- Lara Stalder, Forward, WCHA Player of the Year
- Lara Stalder, WCHA Outstanding Student-Athlete of the Year
- Maura Crowell, WCHA Coach of the Year
- Sydney Morin, WCHA Defensive Player of the Year
- Lara Stalder, Forward, All-WCHA First Team
- Ashleigh Brykaliuk, Forward, All-WCHA Second Team
- Sidney Morin, Defense, All-WCHA Second Team
- Katherine McGovern, Forward, All-WCHA Third Team
- Maddie Rooney, Goaltender, All-WCHA Third Team
- Sydney Brodt, Forward, All-WCHA Rookie Team
