= 2016–17 Minnesota State Mavericks women's ice hockey season =

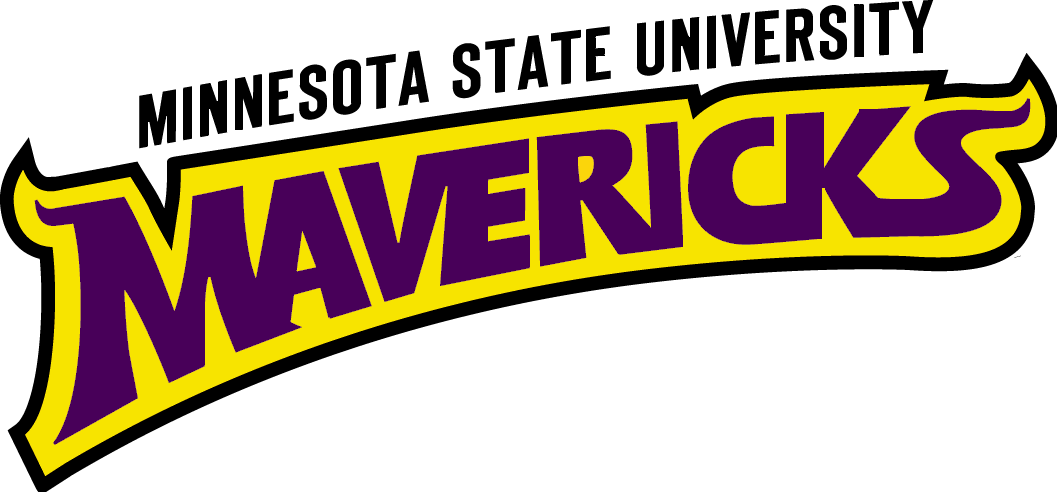
- Conference: WCHA
- Home ice: Verizon Wireless Center, Mankato, MN

Record
- Overall: 7-26-4
- Home: 5-11-2
- Road: 2-14-2
- Neutral: 0-1-0

Coaches and captains
- Head coach: John Harrington
- Assistant coaches: Jeff Giesen; Shari Dickerman
- Captain: Anna Fiegert
- Alternate captain(s): Anna Keys; Savannah Quandt

The Minnesota State Mavericks women's ice hockey program represented Minnesota State University, Mankato during the 2016-17 NCAA Division I women's ice hockey season.

== Recruiting ==
Player	Position	Nationality	Notes
Chloe Crosby	Goaltender	United States	Attended Lakeville South (MN) HS
Demi Gardner	Forward	United States	Played Hockey at Warroad (MN) HS
Taylor Gulenchyn	Forward	United States	Member of Minnesota Revolution
Jordan Jackson	Defender	United States	Blueliner at Tartan (MN) HS
Sofia Poinar	Forward	United States	Attended Chaska-Chanhassen (MN) HS
McKenzie Sederberg	Defender	United States	Played Hockey at Andover (MN) HS

== 2016–17 Mavericks ==
No.	Nat.	Player	Class	Pos	Height	DoB	Hometown	Previous team
3		Savannah Quandt (A)	Senior	F	5' 9" (1.75 m)		Mankato, Minnesota	Mankato East HS
4		Emily Antony	Sophomore	F	5' 6" (1.68 m)		Plymouth, Minnesota	Minnesota Revolution
5		Anna Keys (A)	Junior	D	5' 8" (1.73 m)		Cottage Grove, Minnesota	Park HS
6		Jordan McLaughlin	Sophomore	F	5' 8" (1.73 m)		Grand Rapids, Minnesota	Grand Rapids/Greenway HS
7		Lindsey Coleman	Junior	F	5' 8" (1.73 m)		Savage, Minnesota	Burnsville HS
8		Sara Bustad	Junior	D	5' 7" (1.7 m)		Stillwater, Minnesota	Stillwater HS
9		McKenzie Sederberg	Freshman	F	5' 7" (1.7 m)		Andover, Minnesota	Andover HS
10		Taylor Gulenchyn	Freshman	F	5' 7" (1.7 m)		Stillwater, Minnesota	Stillwater HS
11		Corbin Boyd	Sophomore	F	5' 6" (1.68 m)		Minnetonka, Minnesota	Hopkins HS
12		Anna Fiegert (C)	Senior	D	5' 9" (1.75 m)		Landshut, Germany	Scanlan Creek Academy
13		Leila Kilduff	Sophomore	D	5' 4" (1.63 m)		San Jose, California	North American Hockey Academy
14		Demi Gardner	Freshman	F	5' 9" (1.75 m)		Warroad, Minnesota	Warroad HS
15		Sofia Poinar	Freshman	F	5' 6" (1.68 m)		Chanhassen, Minnesota	Chaska-Chanhassen HS
16		Steph Keryluk	Sophomore	F	5' 5" (1.65 m)		Verona, Wisconsin	Madison Capitals
17		Hannah Davidson	Junior	F	5' 7" (1.7 m)		Kincardine, Ontario	Kitchener-Waterloo
18		Megan Hinze	Sophomore	F	5' 5" (1.65 m)		Carver, Minnesota	Chaska-Chanhassen HS
20		Emma Wittchow	Junior	D	5' 9" (1.75 m)		Burnsville, Minnesota	Burnsville HS
21		Jordan Jackson	Freshman	D	5' 9" (1.75 m)		Maplewood, Minnesota	Tartan HS
23		Amanda Martin	Junior	F	5' 6" (1.68 m)		Peoria, Arizona	North American Hockey Academy
27		Lena Duesterhoeft	Sophomore	D	5' 9" (1.75 m)		Munich, Germany	ESC Planegg
29		Amanda Conway	Junior	F	5' 5" (1.65 m)		Naperville, Illinois	Chicago Mission
30		Brianna Quade	Senior (RS)	G	5' 6" (1.68 m)		Newcastle, Ontario	Whitby
31		Chloe Crosby	Freshman	G	5' 5" (1.65 m)		Lakeville, Minnesota	Lakeville South HS
34		Katie Bidulka	Sophomore	G	5' 9" (1.75 m)		Oakville, Ontario	Brampton

== Schedule ==
Date	Opponent^{#}	Rank^{#}	Site	Decision	Result	Record
Regular Season
September 30	RIT*		Verizon Wireless Center • Mankato, MN	Brianna Quade	W 2–1 ^{OT}	1–0–0
October 1	RIT*		Verizon Wireless Center • Mankato, MN	Katie Bidulka	W 2–1	2–0–0
October 7	at #6 Minnesota-Duluth		Amsoil Arena • Duluth, MN	Brianna Quade	L 0–4	2–1–0 (0–1–0)
October 8	at #6 Minnesota-Duluth		Amsoil Arena • Duluth, MN	Brianna Quade	L 1–5	2–2–0 (0–2–0)
October 14	at #10 North Dakota		Ralph Engelstad Arena • Grand Forks, ND	Brianna Quade	L 0–6	2–3–0 (0–3–0)
October 15	at #10 title=North Dakota		Ralph Engelstad Arena • Grand Forks, ND	Katie Bidulka	L 3–4 ^{OT}	2–4–0 (0–4–0)
October 21	St. Cloud State		Verizon Wireless Center • Mankato, MN	Brianna Quade	T 2–2 ^{OT}	2–4–1 (0–4–1)
October 22	St. Cloud State		Verizon Wireless Center • Mankato, MN	Brianna Quade	L 0–2	2–5–1 (0–5–1)
October 28	#1 Wisconsin		Verizon Wireless Center • Mankato, MN	Brianna Quade	L 0–3	2–6–1 (0–6–1)
October 29	#1 Wisconsin		Verizon Wireless Center • Mankato, MN	Brianna Quade	L 1–3	2–7–1 (0–7–1)
November 4	at #2 Minnesota		Ridder Arena • Minneapolis, MN	Katie Bidulka	L 0–5	2–8–1 (0–8–1)
November 6	at #2 Minnesota		Ridder Arena • Minneapolis, MN	Katie Bidulka	L 1–8	2–9–1 (0–9–1)
November 18	Ohio State		Verizon Wireless Center • Mankato, MN	Katie Bidulka	L 1–2	2–10–1 (0–10–1)
November 19	Ohio State		Verizon Wireless Center • Mankato, MN	Katie Bidulka	W 2–1	3–10–1 (1–10–1)
November 25	Lindenwood*		Verizon Wireless Center • Mankato, MN	Katie Bidulka	L 1–5	3–11–1
November 26	Lindenwood*		Verizon Wireless Center • Mankato, MN	Brianna Quade	T 1–1 ^{OT}	3–11–2
December 2	Bemidji State		Verizon Wireless Center • Mankato, MN	Brianna Quade	L 0–2	3–12–2 (1–11–1)
December 3	Bemidji State		Verizon Wireless Center • Mankato, MN	Brianna Quade	W 3–2	4–12–2 (2–11–1)
December 9	#3 Minnesota-Duluth		Verizon Wireless Center • Mankato, MN	Brianna Quade	L 0–3	4–13–2 (2–12–1)
December 10	#3 Minnesota-Duluth		Verizon Wireless Center • Mankato, MN	Brianna Quade	W 2–1	5–13–2 (3–12–1)
December 16	at Union*		Achilles Center • Schenectady, NY	Brianna Quade	L 1–2	5–14–2
December 17	at Union*		Achilles Center • Schenectady, NY	Katie Bidulka	W 2–1	6–14–2
January 8, 2017	vs. Minnesota*		Braemer Arena • Edina, MN (Women's Face-Off Classic)	Brianna Quade	L 3–5	6–15–2
January 13	North Dakota		Verizon Wireless Center • Mankato, MN	Brianna Quade	L 2–3	6–16–2 (3–13–1)
January 14	North Dakota		Verizon Wireless Center • Mankato, MN	Brianna Quade	L 0–4	6–17–2 (3–14–1)
January 20	at St. Cloud State		Herb Brooks National Hockey Center • St. Cloud, MN	Brianna Quade	L 1–2	6–18–2 (3–15–1)
January 21	at St. Cloud State		Herb Brooks National Hockey Center • St. Cloud, MN	Katie Bidulka	T 3–3 ^{OT}	6–18–3 (3–15–2)
January 27	at #1 Wisconsin		LaBahn Arena • Madison, WI	Brianna Quade	L 0–5	6–19–3 (3–16–2)
January 28	at #1 Wisconsin		LaBahn Arena • Madison, WI	Katie Bidulka	L 1–6	6–20–3 (3–17–2)
February 3	#4 Minnesota		Verizon Wireless Center • Mankato, MN	Brianna Quade	L 0–5	6–21–3 (3–18–2)
February 4	#4 Minnesota		Verizon Wireless Center • Mankato, MN	Brianna Quade	L 3–5	6–22–3 (3–19–2)
February 10	at Ohio State		OSU Ice Rink • Columbus, OH	Brianna Quade	T 1–1 ^{OT}	6–22–4 (3–19–3)
February 11	at Ohio State		OSU Ice Rink • Columbus, OH	Brianna Quade	L 2–4	6–23–4 (3–20–3)
February 17	at Bemidji State		Sanford Center • Bemidji, MN	Chloe Crosby	L 1–6	6–24–4 (3–21–3)
February 18	at Bemidji State		Sanford Center • Bemidji, MN	Chloe Crosby	W 3–1	7–24–4 (4–21–3)
WCHA Tournament
February 24	at #1 Wisconsin*		LaBahn Arena • Madison, WI (Quarterfinals, Game 1)	Chloe Crosby	L 0–7	7–25–4
February 25	at #1 Wisconsin*		LaBahn Arena • Madison, WI (Quarterfinals, Game 2)	Chloe Crosby	L 0–6	7–26–4
*Non-conference game. ^{#}Rankings from USCHO.com Poll.

== Awards and honors ==
- Megan Hinze, WCHA Defensive Player of the Month- December, 2106
