= 4th NWHL All-Star Game =

| | 1 | 2 | 3 | Total |
|---|---|---|---|---|
| Team Stecklein | x | x | x | 2 |
| Team Szabados | x | x | x | 3 |
- Date: February 10, 2019
- Arena: Bridgestone Arena
- City: Nashville, TN, United States

The 4th NWHL All-Star Game took place on February 10, 2019, at Bridgestone Arena in Nashville, Tennessee. More than 6,000 people attended the game, setting an attendance record for the NWHL. Lee Stecklein of the Minnesota Whitecaps and goaltender Shannon Szabados of the Buffalo Beauts were named team captains. Slated to begin at 2:45 pm, the NWHL All-Stars took to the ice after the NHL's Nashville Predators and the St. Louis Blues played their scheduled game at 11:30 am. On Saturday, February 9, the NWHL hosted the All-Star Skills Challenge at Ford Ice Center.

Participating players represented a total of five countries, including the United States and Canada, plus the Czech Republic, Finland and Sweden. The combined rosters featured five members each from the Connecticut Whale and Metropolitan Riveters, with the Boston Pride being represented by six players. Of note, the Buffalo Beauts and Minnesota Whitecaps each had eight players named to the All-Star Game.

== News and notes ==
=== Fan balloting ===
Emily Fluke, captain of the Connecticut Whale, and Audra Richards of the Metropolitan Riveters were selected to participate in the All-Star Game via an online fan vote. Over 2,300 votes were cast and both were first-time NWHL All-Stars.

The attendance was 6,120, setting a record for the largest crowd to attend an NWHL event.

== Events ==
The skills challenge took place on February 9 at the Ford Ice Center, the Nashville Predators' practice facility, with a sell-out crowd. Kendall Coyne Schofield of the Minnesota Whitecaps won the fastest skater, two weeks following her appearance as the first woman to compete in the NHL's Skills Competition as part of the 2019 National Hockey League All-Star Game, also in the fastest skater competition. Blake Bolden (Buffalo Beauts) won the hardest shot, Nicole Hensley (Buffalo Beauts) won the fastest goalie competition, and Dani Cameranesi (Buffalo Beauts) won the accuracy shooting contest.

The All-Star Game took place immediately following a game between the NHL's St. Louis Blues and the Nashville Predators at Bridgestone Arena. The game was a four-on-four format between teams led by Shannon Szabados and Lee Stecklein, with Team Szabados winning 3–2 following a shootout. The game set an attendance record with 6,120 at the arena.
