= Emily Fluke =

American ice hockey forward (born 1992)

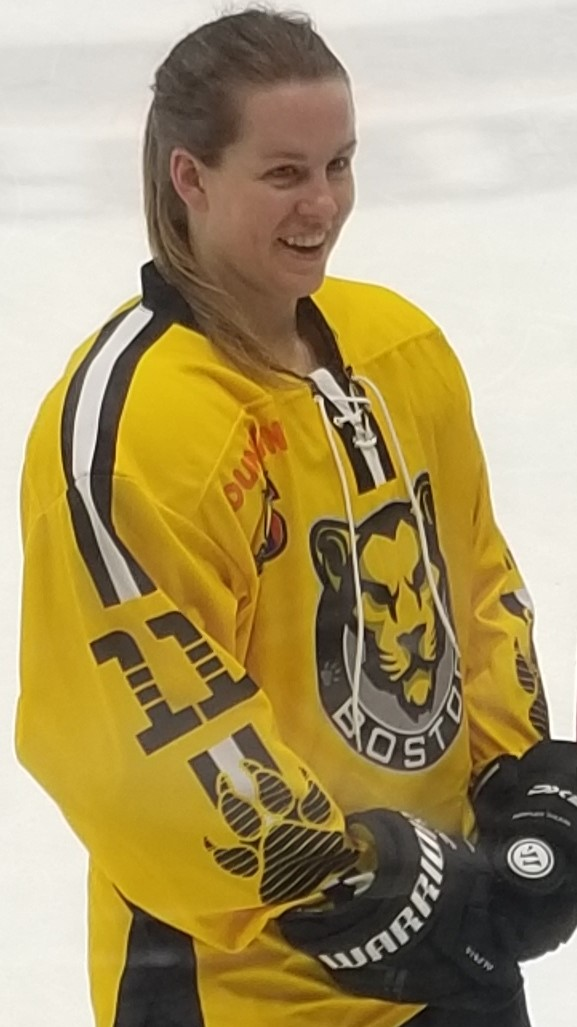
- Emily Fluke in the Isobel Playoffs 3-8-2020
- Born: September 3, 1992 (age 32); Bourne, Massachusetts, U.S.
- Height: 5 ft 5 in (165 cm)
- Position: Forward
- Shoots: Right
- PHF team Former teams: Connecticut Whale; Toronto Six; Boston Pride; Middlebury Panthers
- Playing career: 2011–present

Emily Fluke (born September 3, 1992) is an American ice hockey forward, currently playing for the Connecticut Whale of the Premier Hockey Federation (PHF). A two-time PHF All-Star, she formerly served as captain of the Connecticut Whale and is currently the 9th leading scorer in league history.

== Career ==
Across 109 NCAA Division III games with Middlebury Panthers, Fluke scored 115 points. She led the entire New England Small College Athletic Conference (NESCAC) in scoring in her senior year, being named NESCAC Player of the Year and New England Hockey Writers Association's Division II-III Women's Player of the Year.

After graduating, she took a year off hockey. She returned to the ice in 2017 to sign her first professional contract with the Connecticut Whale of the PHF. In her rookie PHF season, she scored 11 points in 16 games, leading her team in goals, assists, and points, and was one of only two players on the team to finish with a positive plus/minus rating. Her first career PHF goal came in her hometown, a game-winning goal against the Boston Pride in her second game of the season. She would be named team captain for the Whale for the 2018–19 season. That season, her second in the league, she scored 11 points in 16 games, leading the team in assists, and was named to the NWHL All-Star Game for the second year in a row.

After two years with the Whale, she signed with the Boston Pride ahead of the 2019–20 season. In her first season with the Pride, she scored 27 points in 23 games, more than doubling her total career points, as the team finished in first place during the regular season.

In December 2020, she announced that she had signed with the expansion Toronto Six for the 2020–21 NWHL season, only the fourth player with previous PHF experience to sign with the Six. She returned to the Whale for the 2021–22 season.

== Career statistics ==
			Regular season					Playoffs
Season	Team	League	GP	G	A	Pts	PIM	GP	G	A	Pts	PIM
2017–18	Connecticut Whale	PHF	16	4	7	11	20	1	0	0	0	0
2018–19	Connecticut Whale	PHF	16	3	8	11	4	1	1	0	1	0
2019–20	Boston Pride	PHF	23	9	18	27	16	1	1	1	2	2
2020–21	Toronto Six	PHF	6	1	1	2	4	1	0	0	0	0
2021–22	Connecticut Whale	PHF	19	5	8	13	0	2	0	0	0	0
PHF totals			80	22	42	64	44	6	2	1	3	2
