= Lee Stecklein =

American ice hockey player (born 1994)

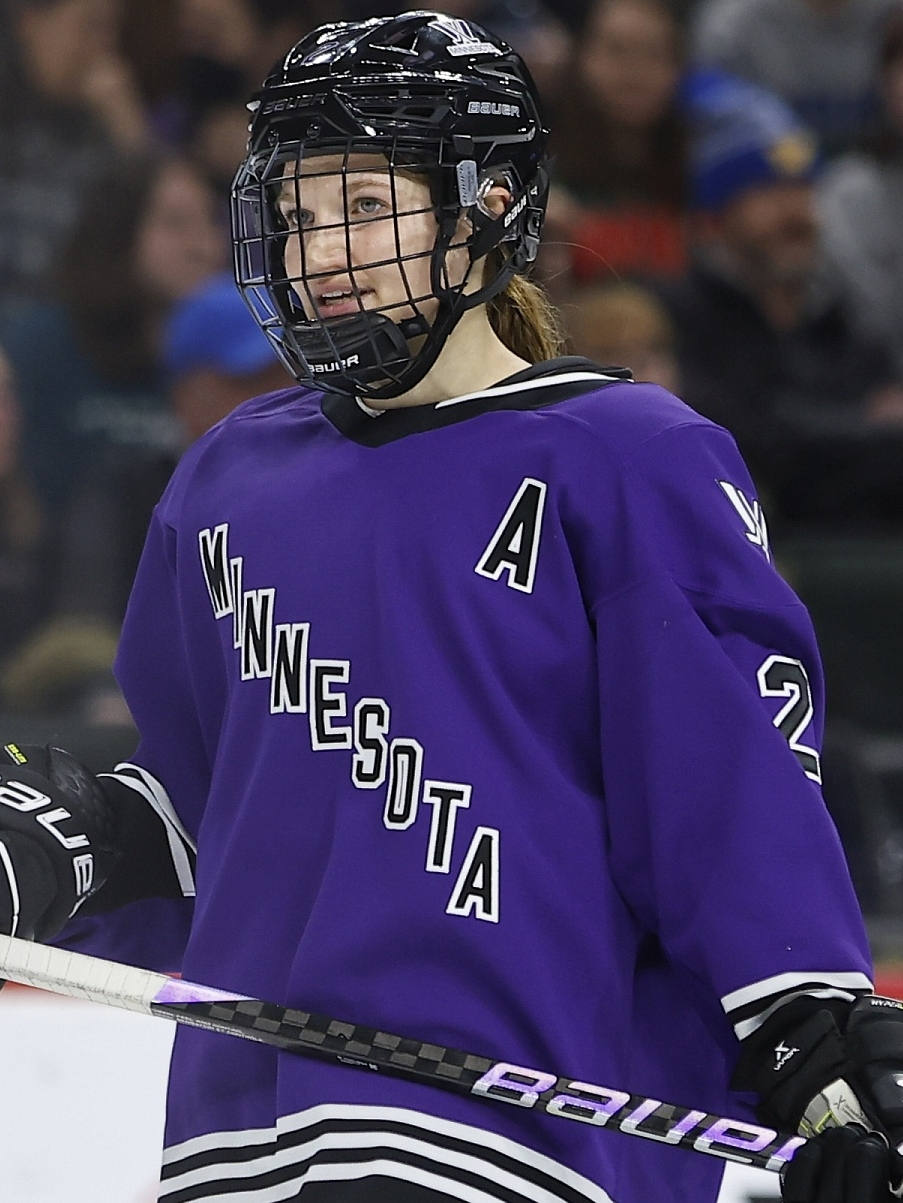
- Stecklein with PWHL Minnesota in 2024
- Born: April 23, 1994 (age 32) Roseville, Minnesota, U.S.
- Height: 6 ft 0 in (183 cm)
- Weight: 170 lb (77 kg; 12 st 2 lb)
- Position: Defender
- Shoots: Left
- PWHL team Former teams: Minnesota Frost; Minnesota Whitecaps
- National team: United States
- Playing career: 2012–present
Medal record
Women's ice hockey
Representing United States
Olympic Games
Gold medal – first place	2018 Pyeongchang	Team
Gold medal – first place	2026 Milano Cortina	Team
Silver medal – second place	2014 Sochi	Team
Silver medal – second place	2022 Beijing	Team
World Championship
Gold medal – first place	2013 Canada
Gold medal – first place	2015 Sweden
Gold medal – first place	2016 Canada
Gold medal – first place	2017 United States
Gold medal – first place	2019 Finland
Gold medal – first place	2023 Canada
Gold medal – first place	2025 Czechia
Gold medal – first place	2026 Denmark
Silver medal – second place	2021 Canada
Silver medal – second place	2022 Denmark

Lee Ethel Stecklein (born April 23, 1994) is an American professional ice hockey player who is a defender for the Minnesota Frost of the Professional Women's Hockey League (PWHL) and the United States national team. She is a four-time Olympic medalist, winning gold at the 2018 Winter Olympics and 2026 Winter Olympics and silver at the 2014 and 2022 games. Stecklein has won eight World Championship gold medals (2013, 2015, 2016, 2017, 2019, 2023, 2025) and two silver medals (2021, 2022), and was named the tournament's Best Defender in 2021. She is the only player to win both the NCAA national championship and World Championship in the same year three times.

Following the formation of the PWHL in 2023, Stecklein was one of the first three players to sign with Minnesota. She helped the Minnesota Frost win back-to-back Walter Cup championships in 2024 and 2025, leading all players in playoff scoring during the 2025 championship run. Previously, she won the Isobel Cup with the Minnesota Whitecaps in 2019, scoring the overtime winner and earning Playoff MVP honors. Stecklein was a founding player of the Professional Women's Hockey Players Association (PWHPA) in 2019 to advocate for a sustainable professional women's league, winning the PWHPA's championship cup in 2023 and earning Best Defender honors.

At the collegiate level, Stecklein won three NCAA championships with the Minnesota Golden Gophers (2013, 2015, 2016), serving as team captain her final two years and alternate in 2015.

== Early life ==
Born in Roseville, Minnesota, to Linda and Robb Stecklein, Lee was raised in Roseville with her siblings, brother Ross and sister Jill. Her mother was a soccer player for the University of Wisconsin from 1981 to 1984. Her brother Ross played ice hockey at St. John's University. Stecklein began playing hockey at age six on her brother's team.

Stecklein attended Roseville Area High School and participated in USA Hockey National Development Camps starting at age 14. She was a member of the U.S. Under-18 Select Team and represented the United States at the Under-18 World Championships in 2010 and 2012. She was selected to participate in the USA Hockey Festival in August 2011 and took part in the Four Nations Pre-Camp in fall 2011.

Stecklein led Roseville to Suburban East Conference championships four times and a Minnesota state title in 2010. In 2012, the Raiders advanced to the state championship game in Class AA, where they lost to Minnetonka. She scored 15 goals and 19 assists for 34 points in her senior year, including seven points in postseason play. As a junior, she tallied 24 points (11 goals, 13 assists) and was Roseville's top-scoring defenseman. Stecklein earned all-state honors in 2011 and 2012, and was honorable mention all-state in 2010. She earned all-conference honors eight times in her career across multiple sports including hockey, lacrosse, and tennis.

External videos
- Lee Stecklein: 2022 Olympic Intro, USA Hockey

== Playing career ==
=== Collegiate ===
Stecklein played four seasons (three years as captain) for the Minnesota Golden Gophers women's ice hockey team from 2012 to 2017, winning three NCAA national championships and establishing herself as one of the program's most decorated defensemen. She played in all 41 games of her freshman season (2012–13) at Minnesota, tallying three goals and nine assists for 12 points with a +35 plus–minus rating. She was named Big Ten Conference Distinguished Scholar. Stecklein scored her first collegiate goal in a 10–2 victory over New Hampshire on November 24, 2012. The following day, she scored the opening goal in a 4–0 win over New Hampshire, receiving assists from Megan Bozek and Amanda Kessel. Minnesota won the 2013 NCAA championship, with Stecklein contributing an assist in the 4–1 final victory over Harvard.

Stecklein redshirted her sophomore season (2013–14) to train full-time with Team USA for the 2014 Winter Olympics. Upon her return to Minnesota for the 2014–15 season, she was named alternate captain and earned multiple honors including AHCA/CCM Hockey Second Team All-American, All-USCHO First Team, and All-WCHA First Team. She tied for fifth in the nation for scoring among defensemen with 27 points (5 goals, 22 assists) and led the Gophers with 59 blocked shots. Minnesota won the 2015 NCAA championship, defeating Harvard 4–1 in the final, with Stecklein recording an assist.

As a junior in 2015–16, Stecklein was named team co-captain alongside Hannah Brandt and posted a career-best 30 points (8 goals, 22 assists) with a +50 plus–minus rating. She was named to the NCAA Frozen Four All-Tournament Team as Minnesota won its third consecutive national championship, defeating Boston College 3–1 in the 2016 final. Stecklein earned AHCA/CCM Hockey Second Team All-American, All-USCHO Second Team, and All-WCHA First Team honors.

External videos
- Lee Stecklein: 2016-17 Gopher Women's Hockey, Minnesota Gophers

In her senior season (2016–17), Stecklein was named team captain and earned AHCA/CCM Hockey First Team All-American honors. She ranked fifth in the nation among defensemen with 24 points (4 goals, 20 assists). She was awarded the Big Ten Conference Medal of Honor and was named to multiple academic honor teams including CoSIDA Academic All-District At-Large First Team. Stecklein was also honored as Minnesota's 2016 Patty Berg Legacy Award recipient for her academic and athletic achievements.

Stecklein finished her career ranked eighth all-time at Minnesota in both career points (83) and career assists (65) among defensemen. Stecklein is the only player to win both the NCAA national championship and the IIHF World Women's Championship in the same year three times (2013, 2015, 2016).

=== Professional ===
==== Minnesota Whitecaps (2018–19) ====
Though Stecklein was selected second overall by the Buffalo Beauts in the 2016 NWHL Draft, she did not play for them due to her commitment to the U.S. national team ahead of the 2018 Olympics. When the Minnesota Whitecaps were added to the league as an expansion team ahead of the 2018–19 season, Stecklein signed with the team on June 20, 2018.

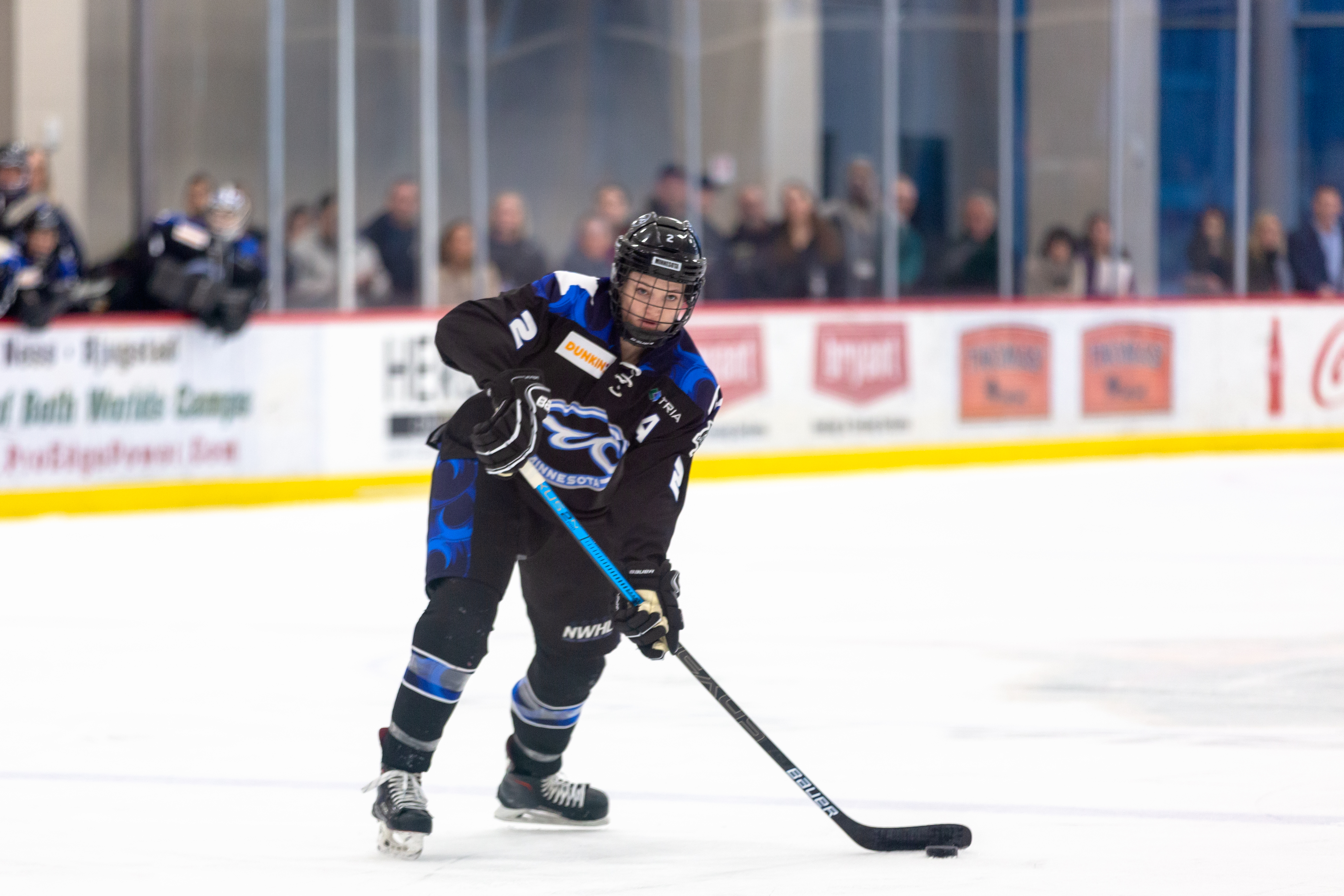
Stecklein on the ice for the Minnesota Whitecaps, March 2019

In the regular season, Stecklein recorded six assists in the first four games as the Whitecaps began their inaugural campaign with four consecutive wins over the Metropolitan Riveters. Paired with Amanda Boulier on defense, the duo combined for 11 points to form the highest-scoring defensive tandem in the league. The Whitecaps finished as regular season champions with a 12–4–0 record and sold out all ten home games at TRIA Rink.

In her lone season with the team, Stecklein helped the Whitecaps win the Isobel Cup, scoring the overtime winner in the championship game against the Beauts. Stecklein was named Playoff MVP after recording one goal, one assist, and four blocked shots in the final. She was named one of the team captains for the 4th NWHL All-Star Game earlier in the season.

==== PWHPA (2019–23) ====
In 2019, following the collapse of the Canadian Women's Hockey League (CWHL), Stecklein joined more than 200 other prominent women's players in founding the Professional Women's Hockey Players Association (PWHPA), which vowed to boycott the NWHL with the goal of establishing a unified and financially stable professional league. Stecklein released a statement saying that it was not possible to make a "sustainable living in the current state of the professional game", and specifically noted the low salaries and lack of health insurance policies.

External videos
- Making History at The Garden: PWHPA Dream Gap Tour, New York Rangers

The PWHPA organized the Dream Gap Tour, a series of showcase games across North America. Stecklein played for the Minnesota-based team through the regional hub system. In February 2021, she played in a historic game at Madison Square Garden, marking both the first time professional women's hockey was played at the venue and the first professional women's hockey game broadcast live on television. The game was televised on NHL Network in the United States and Sportsnet in Canada. Stecklein also participated in Dream Gap Tour stops in Chicago, where she scored her first point of the 2021 tour on a power play goal against New Hampshire.

For the 2022–23 PWHPA season, Stecklein played for Team Harvey's, named after Hayley Wickenheiser. In the November 2022 showcase in Truro, Nova Scotia, she was named PWHPA Athlete of the Week after leading all defenders with seven points, including a four-point performance in one game. She was later named the first star of a 5–1 win over Team Scotiabank with one goal and three assists. Team Harvey's went undefeated during the Truro showcase. At the end of the 2022–23 season, Stecklein was named PWHPA Best Defender and won the championship cup.

==== Minnesota Frost (2023–present) ====
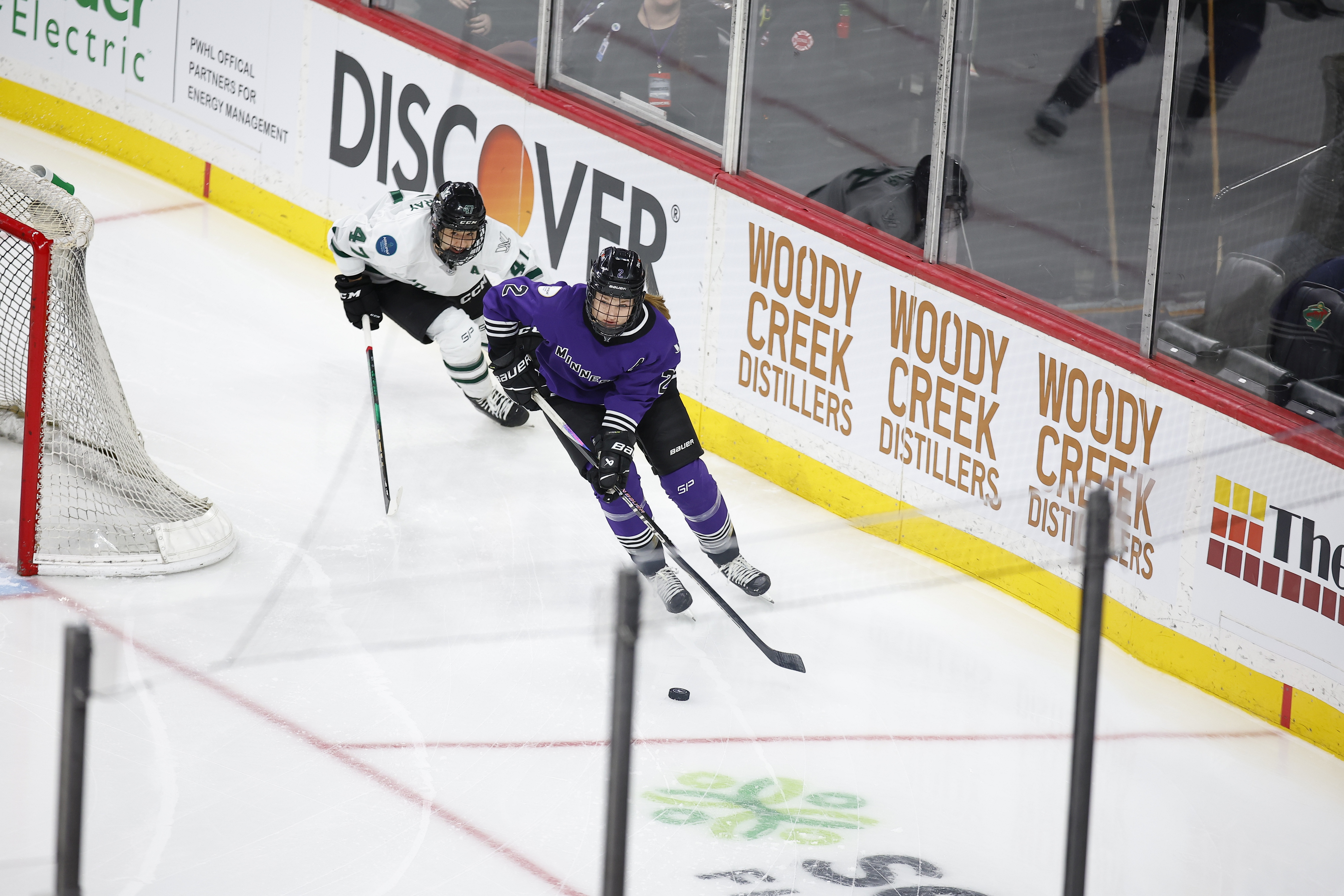
Stecklein playing for the Minnesota Frost, February 2024

In 2023, the PWHPA and its partners announced the launch of the Professional Women's Hockey League (PWHL). On September 6, 2023, Stecklein was one of the first three players to sign with PWHL Minnesota, later branded the Minnesota Frost, alongside national teammates Kendall Coyne Schofield and Kelly Pannek. Ahead of the team's inaugural season, Stecklein was named an alternate captain. Stecklein was voted as Minnesota's player representative for the PWHL Players Association, the league's labour union.

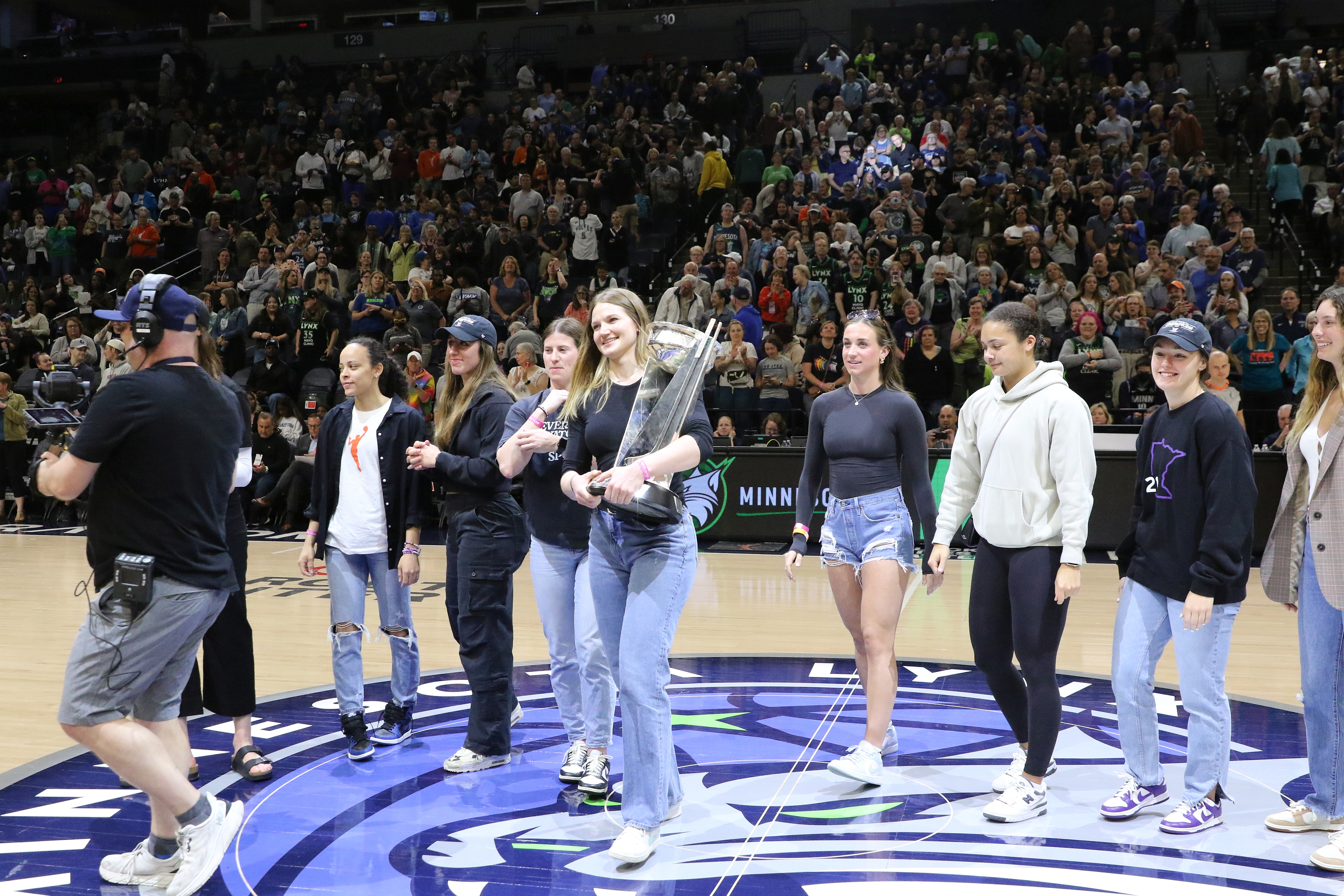
Stecklein carries the 2024 Walter Cup.

Stecklein scored her first goal with Minnesota on January 14, 2024, against New York. In the inaugural season, she recorded eight points in 24 regular season games, leading all Minnesota defensemen in ice time. The Frost finished as the fourth seed and defeated first-seeded Toronto Sceptres in the semifinals, completing a reverse sweep after losing the first two games. Minnesota won the inaugural Walter Cup championship, defeating Boston in five games. Stecklein contributed three assists in the ten playoff games.

In the 2024–25 PWHL season, Stecklein recorded nine points in 30 regular season games. After going scoreless in the first 28 games of the season, she broke her goal-scoring drought by scoring twice in a 3–0 win at Ottawa and once at Boston in the final two games of the regular season to help the Frost clinch the final playoff spot. In the playoffs, Stecklein became the first player in PWHL history to record three points—two goals and an assist—in a single period during a Game 2 victory at Toronto. She led all players in playoff scoring with eight points (four goals, four assists) in eight games as the Frost won their second consecutive Walter Cup championship, defeating the Ottawa Charge in four games.

== International play ==
Stecklein made her senior national team debut at the 2013 IIHF Women's World Championship, where she won a gold medal. The 2013 title marked the first time Stecklein won both the NCAA national championship and the IIHF World Women's Championship in the same year, a feat she would accomplish three times in her career (2013, 2015, 2016).

=== Olympics ===
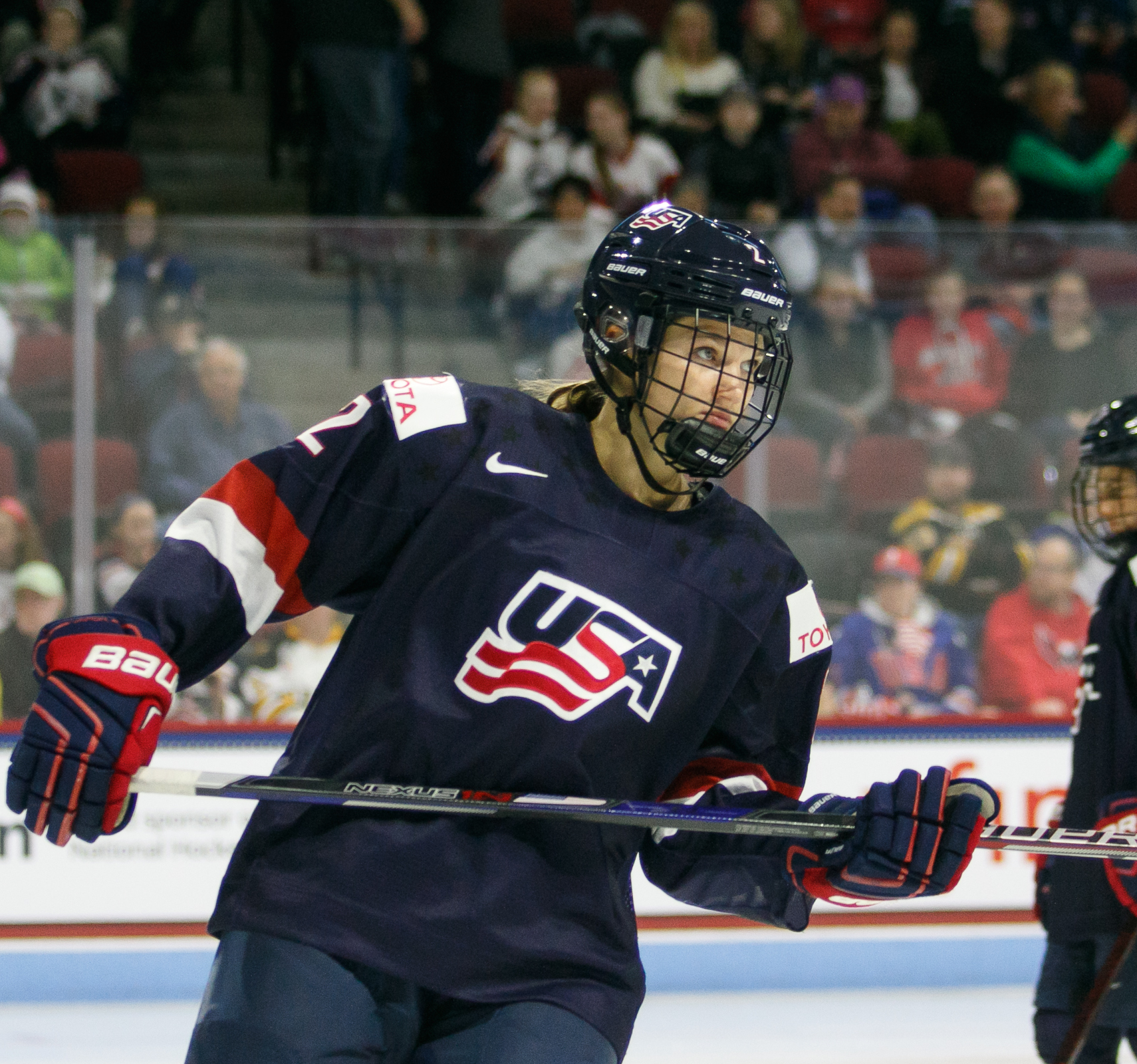
Stecklein playing for Team USA in 2017

After redshirting her sophomore season at the University of Minnesota to train full-time with Team USA for the 2014 Winter Olympics, Stecklein competed in Sochi, where she won a silver medal as the youngest member of Team USA at age 19. She recorded one assist in five games. The United States lost to Canada 3–2 in overtime in the gold medal game. Canada's Marie-Philip Poulin tied the game with 55 seconds remaining in regulation and scored the overtime winner. After the Olympics, Stecklein returned to the University of Minnesota.

At the 2018 Winter Olympics in PyeongChang, Stecklein won gold as the United States defeated Canada 3–2 in a shootout in the final. Stecklein led all American skaters in ice time with an average of 22:27 per game. It was the first Olympic gold medal for the United States women's hockey team since 1998.

At the 2022 Winter Olympics in Beijing, Stecklein won a silver medal. She scored one goal in the quarterfinal against the Czech Republic, breaking a 1–1 tie. The United States lost to Canada 3–2 in the gold medal game.

On January 2, 2026, she was named to Team USA's roster for the 2026 Winter Olympics.

=== World Championships ===
Stecklein represented the United States at the IIHF World Women's Championship in 2015, 2016, 2017, 2019, 2021, and 2022. She won gold medals in 2015, 2016, 2017, 2019, and 2023, and silver medals in 2021 and 2022. At the 2021 IIHF Women's World Championship, Stecklein was named the tournament's best defender.

In total, Stecklein won seven World Championship gold medals and two silver medals. Her final game with the senior national team before stepping away was the gold medal victory at the 2023 IIHF Women's World Championship in Brampton, Ontario.

In 2023, Stecklein stepped away from the national team. She returned to the team in time to be selected for the 2025 IIHF Women's World Championship, where she won her eighth World Championship gold medal. In the gold medal game, the United States defeated Canada 4–3 in overtime. She also scored a goal in a 2–1 pool play victory over Canada.

== Personal life ==
Stecklein graduated from the Carlson School of Management at the University of Minnesota with a BBA in entrepreneurial management in 2017. She worked as a digital content specialist with Clif Bar in 2018.

== Career statistics ==
=== Regular season and playoffs ===
Note: GP = Games played; G = Goals; A = Assists; Pts = Points; PIM = Penalty minutes;

			Regular season					Playoffs
Season	Team	League	GP	G	A	Pts	PIM	GP	G	A	Pts	PIM
2012–13	University of Minnesota	WCHA	41	3	9	12	8	—	—	—	—	—
2014–15	University of Minnesota	WCHA	40	5	22	27	4	—	—	—	—	—
2015–16	University of Minnesota	WCHA	40	8	22	30	8	—	—	—	—	—
2016–17	University of Minnesota	WCHA	36	4	20	24	12	—	—	—	—	—
2018–19	Minnesota Whitecaps	NWHL	16	1	8	9	8	2	1	1	2	0
2019–20	Independent	PWHPA	–	–	–	—	–	—	—	—	—	—
2020–21	Team Minnesota	PWHPA	6	1	1	2	0	—	—	—	—	—
2023–24	PWHL Minnesota	PWHL	24	2	6	8	16	10	0	3	3	2
2024–25	Minnesota Frost	PWHL	30	3	6	9	6	8	4	4	8	2
NWHL totals			16	1	8	9	8	2	1	1	2	0
PWHPA totals			6	1	1	2	0	—	—	—	—	—
PWHL totals			54	5	12	17	22	18	4	7	11	4

=== International ===
Note: GP = Games played; G = Goals; A = Assists; Pts = Points; PIM = Penalty minutes;

				Regular season
Year	Team	Event	Result	GP	G	A	Pts	PIM
2011	United States	U18	1st place, gold medalist(s)	5	0	1	1	2
2012	United States	U18	2nd place, silver medalist(s)	5	0	3	3	0
2013	United States	WC	1st place, gold medalist(s)	3	0	1	1	2
2014	United States	OG	2nd place, silver medalist(s)	5	0	1	1	0
2015	United States	WC	1st place, gold medalist(s)	5	0	4	4	0
2016	United States	WC	1st place, gold medalist(s)	5	0	2	2	0
2017	United States	WC	1st place, gold medalist(s)	5	0	0	0	0
2018	United States	OG	1st place, gold medalist(s)	5	0	0	0	0
2019	United States	WC	1st place, gold medalist(s)	7	2	2	4	4
2021	United States	WC	2nd place, silver medalist(s)	7	2	5	7	0
2022	United States	OG	2nd place, silver medalist(s)	7	1	0	1	0
2022	United States	WC	2nd place, silver medalist(s)	7	1	3	4	2
2023	United States	WC	1st place, gold medalist(s)	7	0	1	1	0
2025	United States	WC	1st place, gold medalist(s)	6	2	1	3	0
2026	United States	OG	1st place, gold medalist(s)	7	0	2	2	0
Junior totals				10	0	4	4	2
Senior totals				76	8	22	30	8

== Awards and honors ==
Award	Year
College
NCAA Women's Ice Hockey Tournament Champion	2013, 2015, 2016
Big Ten Distinguished Scholar	2012–13, 2014–15, 2015–16, 2016–17
AHCA All-American Second Team	2014–15, 2015–16
All-USCHO First Team	2014–15
Academic All-Big Ten	2014–15, 2015–16, 2016–17
All-WCHA First Team	2014–15, 2015–16, 2016–17
WCHA All-Academic Team	2014–15, 2015–16, 2016–17
WCHA Scholar Athlete	2014–15, 2015–16, 2016–17
All-USCHO Second Team	2015–16, 2016–17
NCAA Frozen Four All-Tournament Team	2016
CoSIDA Academic All-America At-Large Second Team	2015–16, 2016–17
CoSIDA Academic All-District At-Large First Team	2015–16, 2016–17
AHCA All-American First Team	2016–17
Big Ten Medal of Honor	2016–17
Patty Berg Legacy Award	October 2016
NWHL
Isobel Cup Champion	2019
Isobel Cup Playoffs MVP	2019
NWHL All-Star	2018–19
PWHL
Walter Cup Champion	2024, 2025
International
World Championship Best Defender	2021
World Championship All-Star Team	2021
