= LaBahn Arena =

Hockey arena in Madison, Wisconsin

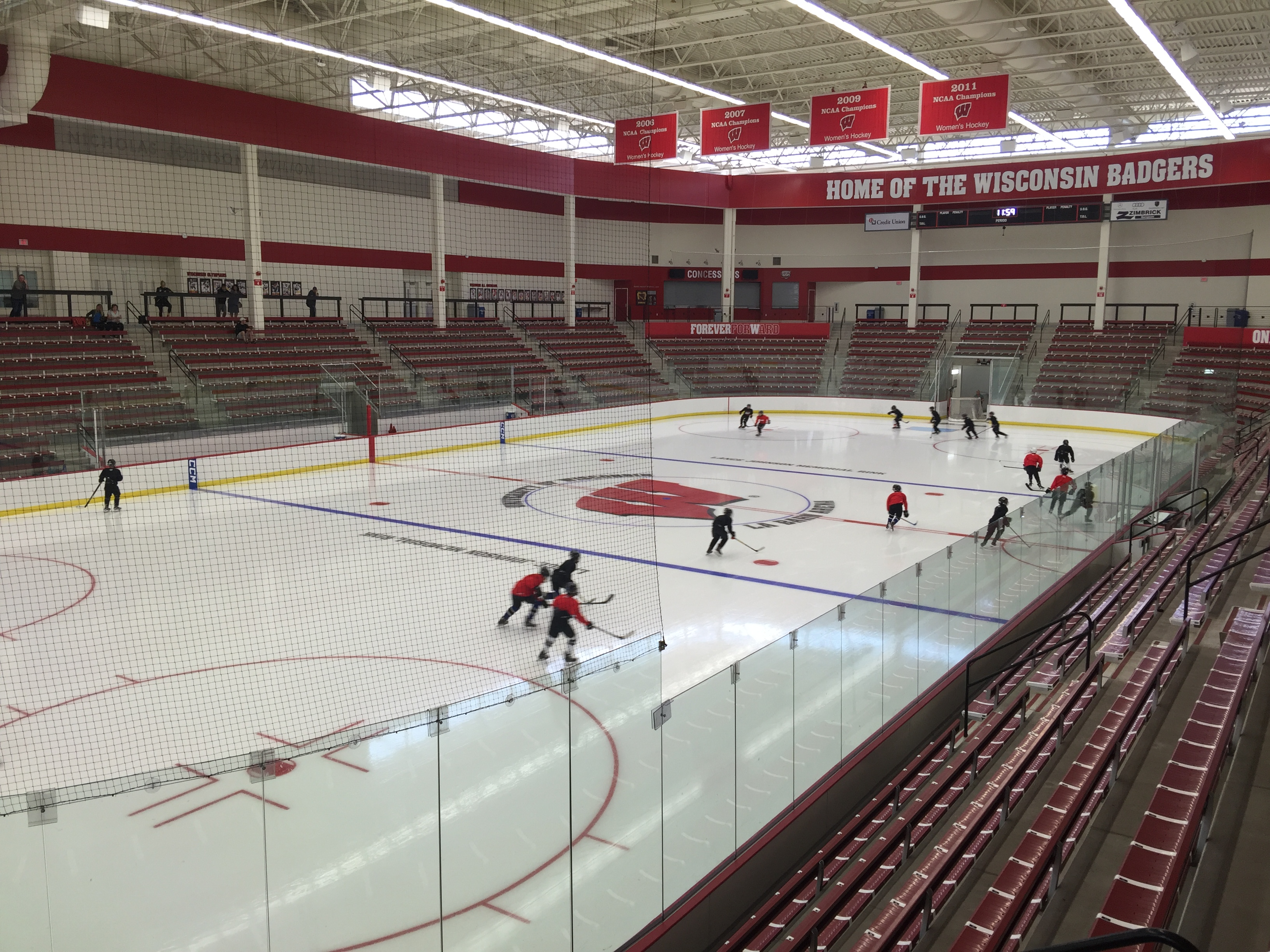
- LaBahn Arena in June of 2017

- Location in Wisconsin Location in the United States
- Location: 105 East Campus Mall; Madison, Wisconsin 53715
- Coordinates: 43.0694°N 89.39697°W
- Owner: University of Wisconsin–Madison
- Operator: University of Wisconsin–Madison
- Capacity: 2,273
- Surface: 200' x 90'
- Public transit: Metro Transit

Construction
- Groundbreaking: May 11, 2011
- Opened: October 19, 2012
- Cost: $34 million
- Architects: Kahler Slater, Inc.

Tenants
- Wisconsin Badgers women's ice hockey (2012–present); Wisconsin Badgers men's ice hockey (2020–2021)

LaBahn Arena is the home ice of the Wisconsin Badgers women's ice hockey team. It was the second arena to be purpose-built for a women's collegiate hockey team; the first was Minnesota's Ridder Arena. The arena is connected via a tunnel to the Kohl Center, which the women's team shared with the men's team from its inception in 1999 until 2012. The men's team also practices there. The facility also houses locker rooms for the swimming and diving teams.

== Naming ==
The arena is named for longtime Badger boosters Chuck and Mary Ann LaBahn, its main fundraisers.

== Background ==
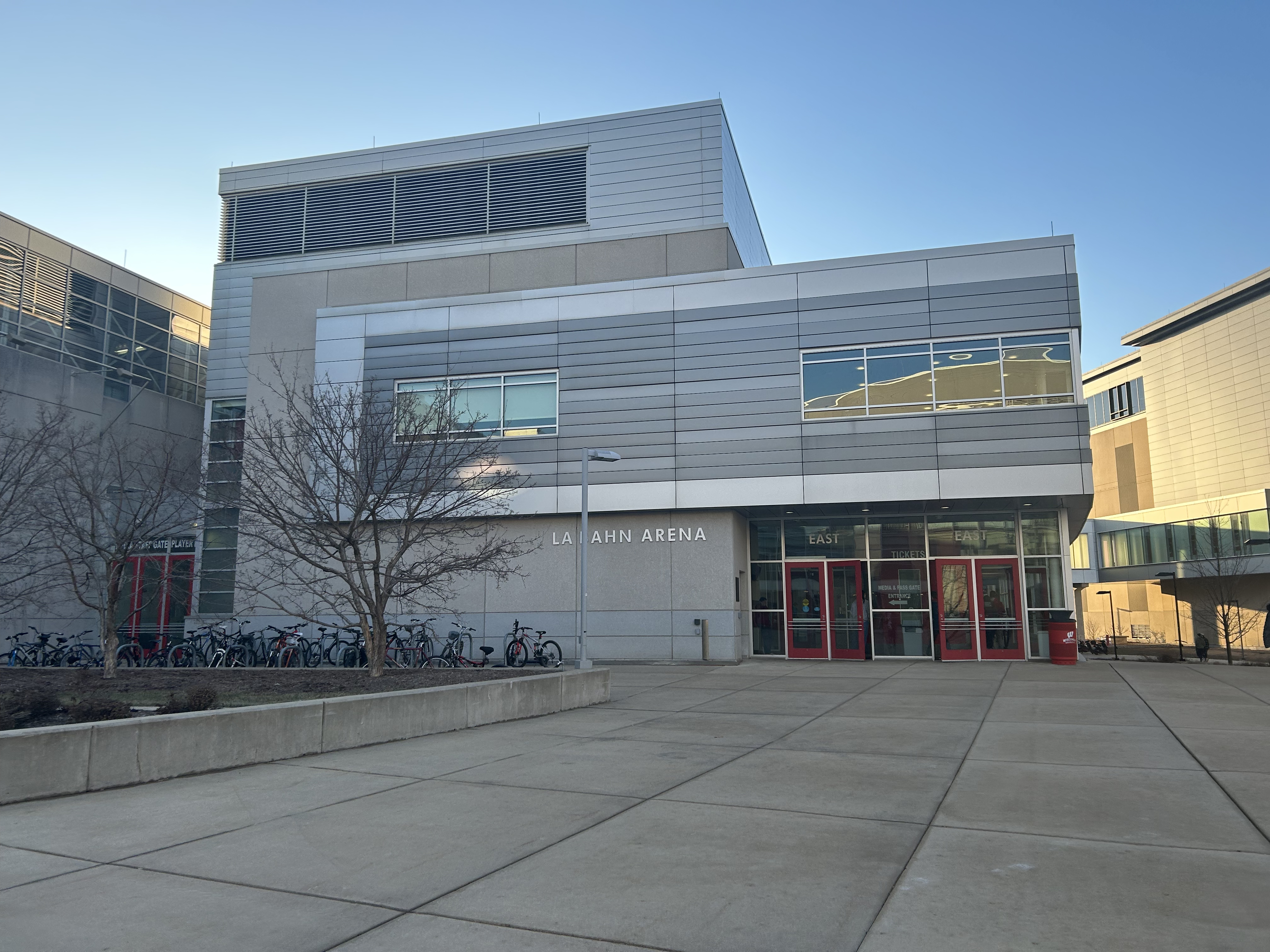
Arena exterior, photographed in 2024

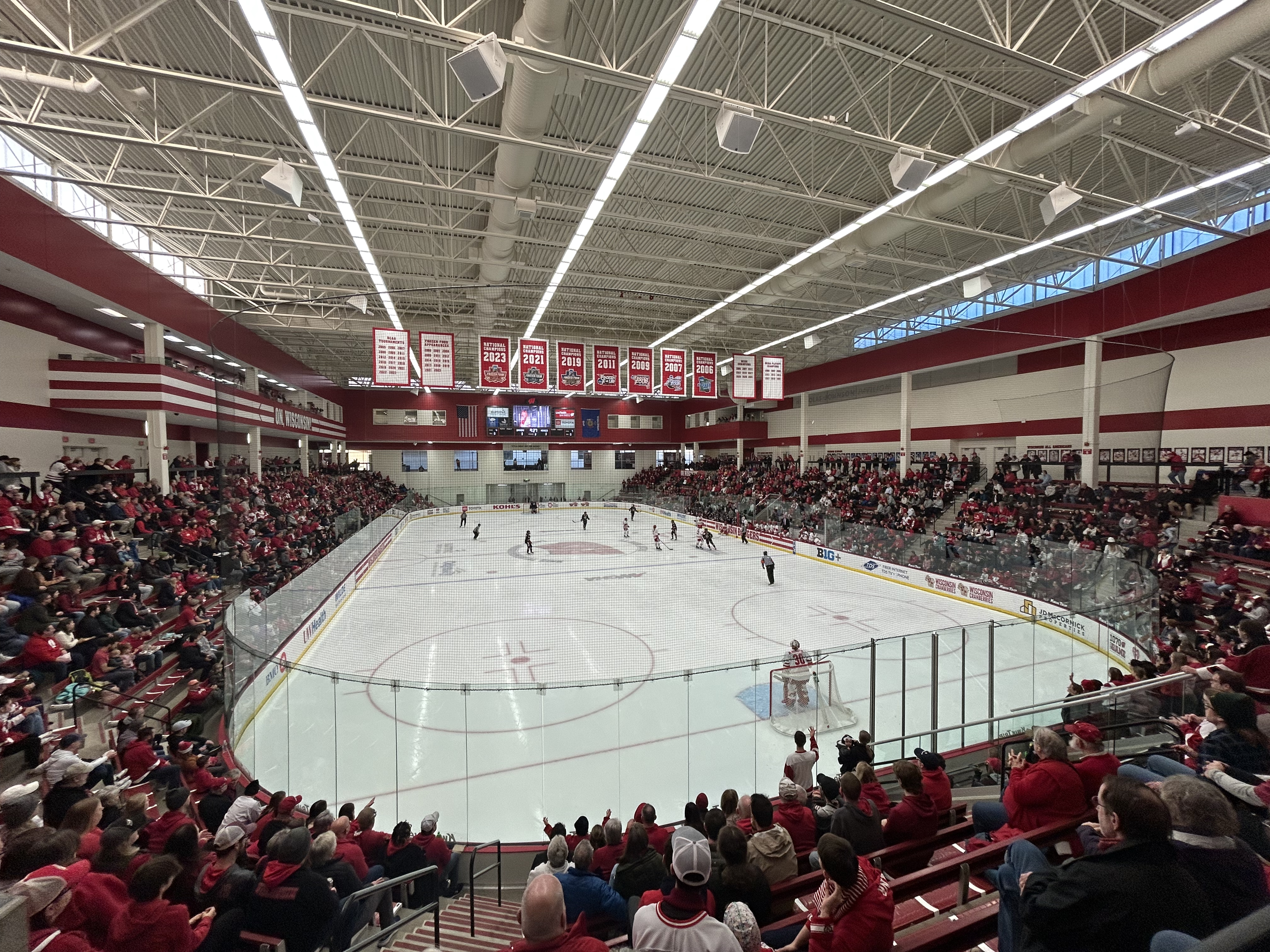
2024 game at the arena

Before 2012, the women's ice hockey team drove from its headquarters at the Camp Randall Memorial Sports Center to the Kohl Center. Whenever the Kohl Center was being readied for a basketball game, the women drove to a rink in nearby Verona for practice. The men often practiced at the Bob Johnson Hockey Facility three miles from campus or the Memorial Sports Center when the Kohl Center was being readied for basketball. They often had to make these trips in dangerous conditions during Madison's typically snowy and icy winters, leading Wisconsin State Journal columnist Andy Baggot to argue that LaBahn's construction was a "necessity" for the players' safety.

The men's ice hockey team also played at LaBahn Arena during the 2020-21 season. Normally, LaBahn serves as the backup venue for the men's team. However, during the 2020-21 season, the Big Ten Conference mandated all conference games be played behind closed doors. School officials felt they could not justify the expense of switching the Kohl Center between basketball and hockey without fans in attendance, and opted to have the men play the entire season at LaBahn.
