= Ohio State University Ice Rink =

Hockey rink in Ohio

- Interactive map of Ohio State University Ice Rink
- Location: 390 Woody Hayes Dr. Columbus, OH 43210
- Coordinates: 40°00′19″N 83°01′06″W
- Owner: Ohio State University
- Operator: Ohio State University
- Capacity: 1,415 (hockey)

Construction
- Opened: 1961

Tenants
- Men's ice hockey: 1963–1998; Women's ice hockey: 1999–present

The Ohio State University Ice Rink is a 1,415-seat hockey rink located at Ohio State University in Columbus, Ohio, United States. The rink was built in 1961 and houses the Ohio State Buckeyes women's ice hockey team. The men's hockey team occupied the facility from 1963 until 1998, when the Value City Arena was completed. A 1999 renovation brought the rink to full NHL dimensions and improved the facilities. The rink is located adjacent to the east side of St. John Arena on Woody Hayes Drive, just north of Ohio Stadium.

In 2007, the men's Buckeye hockey team played three preliminary-round CCHA tournament games at the Ice Rink due to scheduling conflicts with the OHSAA Wrestling Tournament at Value City Arena. These games marked the men's ice hockey team's first game in the Ice Rink since 1999.
