= 2016–17 NCAA Division I women's ice hockey season =

Ice hockey sports season

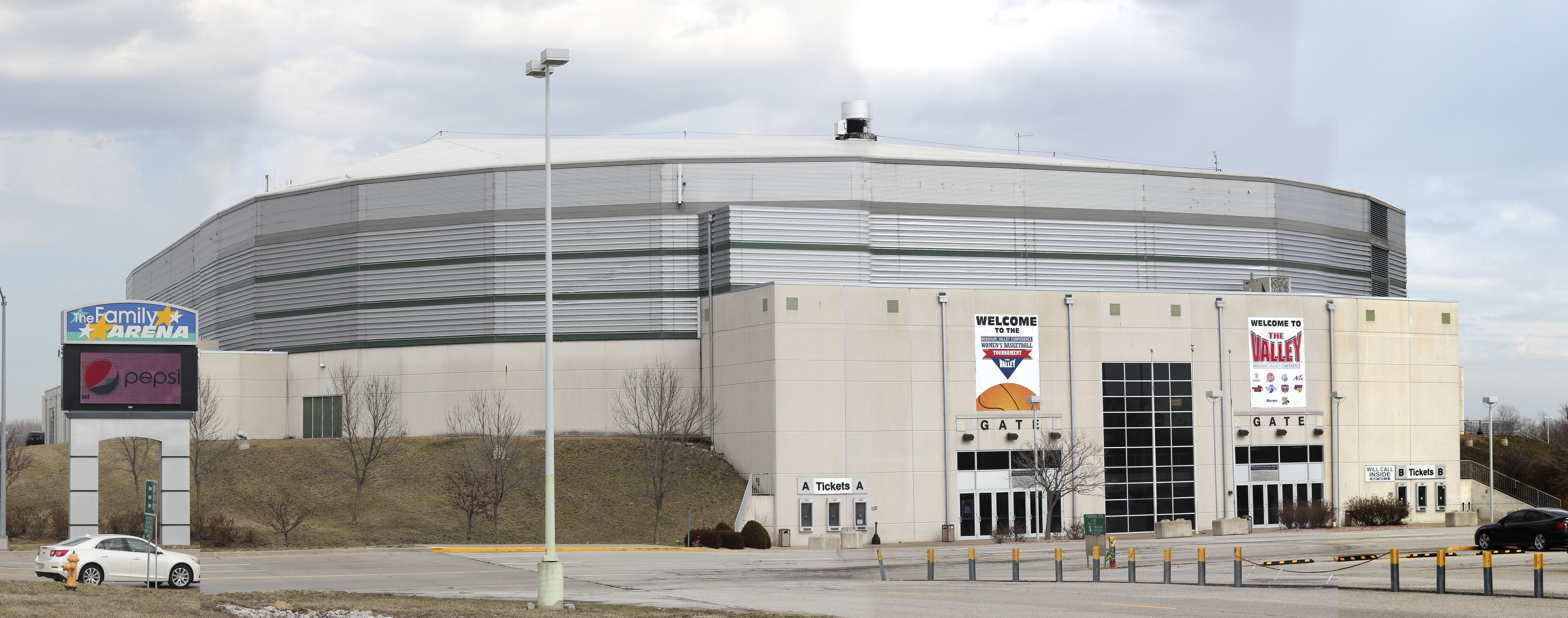
- Family Arena in St. Charles, MO was the site for the 2017 Frozen Four (Women), hosted by Lindenwood University
- Duration: September 26, 2016– March 19, 2017
- NCAA tournament: 2017
- National championship: Family Arena; St. Charles, MO
- NCAA champion: Clarkson
- Patty Kazmaier Award: Ann-Renée Desbiens, Wisconsin ()

The 2016–17 NCAA Division I women's ice hockey season began in September 2016 and ended with the 2017 NCAA Division I women's ice hockey tournament's championship game on March 19, 2017.

== Pre-season polls ==
The top 10 from USCHO.com, September 19, 2016, and the top 10 from USA Today/USA Hockey Magazine, First place votes are in parentheses.

USCHO.com
Ranking	Team
1	Wisconsin (10)
2	Minnesota (3)
3	Boston College (2)
4	Quinnipiac
5	Clarkson
6	North Dakota
7	Princeton
8	Colgate
9	Northeastern
10	Boston University

USA Today/USA Hockey Magazine
Ranking	Team
1	Wisconsin (15)
2	Minnesota (3)
3	Boston College (1)
4	Quinnipiac
5	Clarkson
6	North Dakota
7	Princeton
8	Colgate
9	Northeastern
10	Boston University

== Regular season ==
=== Standings ===
- 2016–17 College Hockey America standings
  	Conference							Overall					
  	GP	W	L	T	PTS	GF	GA	GP	W	L	T	GF	GA
  #8 Robert Morris†*	20	15	3	2	32	60	37	34	24	5	6	106	74
  Syracuse	20	14	4	2	30	63	24	34	16	13	5	85	59
  Mercyhurst	20	11	8	1	23	58	45	35	15	18	2	92	85
  Penn State	20	8	10	2	18	47	54	35	9	21	5	74	104
  RIT	20	4	14	2	10	31	59	36	7	27	2	49	116
  Lindenwood	20	3	16	1	7	18	58	33	6	25	2	36	100
  Championship: Robert Morris † indicates conference regular season champion * indicates conference tournament champion Current rankings: USCHO.com Division I women's poll
- Rankings based on number of wins in the conference
- 2016–17 ECAC Hockey standings
  	Conference							Overall					
  	GP	W	L	T	PTS	GF	GA	GP	W	L	T	GF	GA
  #1 Clarkson†*	22	19	1	2	40	91	32	41	32	4	5	146	63
  #6 St. Lawrence	22	16	3	3	35	75	30	36	26	6	4	115	58
  #7 Cornell	22	13	4	5	31	56	36	34	20	9	5	82	57
  #9 Princeton	22	14	6	2	30	69	33	33	20	10	3	104	63
  Quinnipiac	22	13	6	3	29	64	28	37	21	10	6	94	51
  Colgate	22	13	8	1	27	59	47	36	22	11	3	105	73
  Yale	22	8	12	2	18	46	58	31	10	17	4	69	83
  Rensselaer	22	7	14	1	15	39	73	36	10	24	2	62	117
  Harvard	22	5	13	4	14	37	51	29	5	19	5	52	77
  Brown	22	5	17	0	10	33	98	29	7	22	0	56	126
  Dartmouth	22	5	17	0	10	27	56	28	7	21	0	38	73
  Union	22	2	19	1	5	21	75	34	5	28	1	38	111
  Championship: Clarkson † indicates conference regular season champion * indicates conference tournament champion Final rankings: USCHO.com Division I women's poll
- 2016–17 Western Collegiate Hockey Association standings
  	Conference								Overall					
  	GP	W	L	T	SW	PTS	GF	GA	GP	W	L	T	GF	GA
  #2 Wisconsin*†	28	22	2	4	3	73	110	24	40	33	3	4	157	35
  #4 Minnesota	28	19	4	5	3	65	88	46	39	26	8	5	124	69
  #5 Minnesota Duluth	28	19	5	4	1	62	82	47	37	25	7	5	110	62
  North Dakota	28	11	12	5	3	41	62	57	38	16	16	6	84	73
  Ohio State	28	7	16	5	2	28	40	73	37	14	18	5	69	82
  St. Cloud State	28	7	18	3	2	26	43	82	36	9	23	4	61	113
  Bemidji State	28	7	18	3	1	25	49	80	35	12	20	3	67	90
  Minnesota State	28	4	21	3	1	16	33	98	37	7	26	4	45	127
  Championship: Wisconsin † indicates conference regular season champion * indicates conference tournament champion Current rankings: USCHO.com Division I women's poll
- 2016–17 WHEA standings
  	Conference							Overall					
  	GP	W	L	T	PTS	GF	GA	GP	W	L	T	GF	GA
  #3 Boston College†*	24	17	4	3	37	86	38	39	28	6	5	130	60
  #10 Northeastern	24	14	8	2	30	75	62	37	22	12	3	112	86
  Boston University	24	12	8	4	28	83	62	37	19	12	6	130	104
  Providence	24	11	10	3	25	76	72	37	17	17	3	117	113
  Vermont	24	9	8	7	25	54	58	38	15	14	9	96	90
  New Hampshire	24	11	11	2	24	66	72	35	14	19	2	89	104
  Connecticut	24	9	13	2	20	50	66	36	14	18	4	75	91
  Merrimack	24	7	17	0	14	58	83	36	11	22	3	86	117
  Maine	24	6	17	1	13	51	86	32	10	21	1	66	105
  Championship: Boston College † indicates conference regular season champion * indicates conference tournament champion Current rankings: USCHO.com Division I women's poll
  *Rankings based on number of wins in the conference
- 2016–17 Division I Independents standings
  	Overall					
  	GP	W	L	T	GF	GA
  Sacred Heart	29	18	9	2	113	64

== Player stats ==
=== Scoring leaders ===
The following players lead the NCAA in points at the conclusion of games played on March 19, 2017.

Player	Class	Team	GP	G	A	Pts
Kelly Pannek	Junior	Minnesota	39	19	43	62
Cayley Mercer	Senior	Clarkson	41	28	34	62
Brooke Webster	Senior	St. Lawrence	36	23	34	57
Lara Stalder	Senior	Minnesota Duluth	35	23	33	56
Kennedy Marchment	Junior	St. Lawrence	36	20	36	56
Annie Pankowski	Junior	Wisconsin	36	25	30	55
Sarah Nurse	Senior	Wisconsin	39	25	28	53
Sarah Potomak	Sophomore	Minnesota	38	20	33	53
Genevieve Bannon	Senior	Clarkson	41	15	38	53
Brittany Howard	Junior	Robert Morris	35	20	30	50

=== Leading goaltenders ===
The following goaltenders lead the NCAA in goals against average at the conclusion of games played on March 19, 2017, while playing at least 33% of their team's total minutes.

Player	Class	Team	GP	Min	W	L	T	GA	SO	SV%	GAA
Ann-Renee Desbiens	Senior	Wisconsin	35	2115:52	29	2	4	25	17	.963	0.71
Sydney Rossman	Senior	Quinnipiac	34	2028:08	18	10	5	49	9	.929	1.45
Steph Neatby	Freshman	Princeton	19	1187:03	12	5	1	30	4	.950	1.52
Marlene Boissonnault	Sophomore	Cornell	13	788:51	10	1	2	20	2	.925	1.52
Katie Burt	Junior	Boston College	37	2225:04	26	6	5	57	8	.935	1.54

== Awards ==
=== WCHA ===
Award		Recipient
Player of the Year		Lara Stalder, Minnesota Duluth
Outstanding Student-Athlete of the Year		Lara Stalder, Minnesota Duluth
Defensive Player of the Year		Sidney Morin, Minnesota Duluth
Rookie of the Year		Abby Roque, Wisconsin
Scoring Champion		Kelly Pannek, Minnesota
Goaltending Champion		Ann-Renee Desbiens, Wisconsin
Coach of the Year		Maura Crowell, Minnesota Duluth
All-WCHA Teams
First Team	Position	Second Team
Ann-Renee Desbiens, Wisconsin	G	Kassidy Sauve, Ohio State
Jenny Ryan, Wisconsin	D	Halli Krzyzaniak, North Dakota
Lee Stecklein, Minnesota	D	Sidney Morin, Minnesota Duluth
Kelly Pannek, Minnesota	F	Sarah Nurse, Wisconsin
Lara Stalder, Minnesota Duluth	F	Ashleigh Brykaliuk, Minnesota Duluth
Annie Pankowski, Wisconsin	F	Sarah Potomak, Minnesota
Third Team	Position	Rookie Team
Maddie Rooney, Minnesota Duluth	G	Janine Alder, St. Cloud State
Jincy Roese, Ohio State	D	Jincy Roese, Ohio State
Megan Wolfe, Minnesota	D	Mekenzie Steffan, Wisconsin
Dani Cameranesi, Minnesota	F	Sydney Brodt, Minnesota Duluth
Emily Clark, Wisconsin	F	Abby Roque, Wisconsin
Katherine McGovern, Minnesota Duluth	F	Ryleigh Houston, North Dakota

=== CHA ===
Award		Recipient
Player of the Year		Brittany Howard, F, Robert Morris
Rookie of the Year		Jaycee Gebhard, F, Robert Morris
Goaltender of the Year		Abbey Miller, Syracuse
Defenseman of the Year		Allie Munroe, Syracuse
Defensive Forward of the Year		Mackenzie Stone, RIT
Sportsmanship Award		Caitlin Wallace, RIT
Coach of the Year		Paul Colontino, Robert Morris
CHA All-Conference Teams
First Team	Position	Second Team
Jessica Dodds, Robert Morris	G	Abbey Miller, Syracuse
Allie Munroe, Syracuse	D	Bella Sutton, Penn State
Kirsten Welsh, Robert Morris	D	Jillian Skinner, Mercyhurst
Laura Bowman, Penn State	F	Brooke Hartwick, Mercyhurst
Stephanie Grossi, Syracuse	F	Jaycee Gebhard, Robert Morris
Brittany Howard, Robert Morris	F	Amy Petersen, Penn State
Rookie Team	Position	–
Terra Lanteigne, RIT	G	
Lindsay Eastwood, Syracuse	D	
Courtney Ganske, Lindenwood	D	
Katie McMillen, Penn State	D	
Jaycee Gebhard, Robert Morris	F	
Maggie Knott, Mercyhurst	F	
Brooke Madsen, Penn State	F	
Savannah Rennie, Syracuse	F	

=== Women's Hockey East Association (WHEA) ===
Award		Recipient
Cami Granato Award (Player of the Year)		Megan Keller, Boston College
Pro Ambitions Rookie of the Year		Whitney Dove, Providence; Tereza Vanišová, Maine
Hockey East Coach of the Year		Bob Deraney, Providence
Best Defensive Forward		Hayley Scamurra, Northeastern
Best Defenseman		Megan Keller, Boston College
Sportmanship Award		Cassidy Carels, Providence
Army ROTC Three Stars Award		Victoria Bach, Boston University
Scoring Champion		Jonna Curtis, New Hampshire
Hockey East All-Star Teams
First Team	Position	Second Team
Victoria Hanson, Boston University	G	Madison Litchfield, Vermont
Amy Schlagel, New Hampshire	D	Heather Mottau, Northeastern
Megan Keller, Boston College	D	Taylor Willard, Vermont
Victoria Bach, Boston University	F	Mary Parker, Boston University
McKenna Brand, Northeastern	F	Makenna Newkirk, Boston College
Jonna Curtis, New Hampshire	F	Denisa Křížová, Northeastern
Honorable Mention	Position	Rookie Team
Katie Burt, Boston College	G	
Annie Belanger, Connecticut	G	
Whitney Dove, Providence	D	Whitney Dove, Providence
Kali Flanagan, Boston College	D	Abby Cook, Boston University
Kate Friesen, Providence	D	
Andie Anastos, Boston College	F	Delaney Belinskas, Boston College
Brooke Stacey, Maine	F	Caitrin Lonergan, Boston College
Cassidy Carels, Providence	F	Ève-Audrey Picard, Vermont
	F	Tereza Vanišová, Maine

=== ECAC ===
Award		Recipient
Player of the Year		Cayley Mercer, Clarkson
Best Forward		Cayley Mercer, Clarkson
Best Defenseman		Savannah Harmon, Clarkson
Rookie of the Year		Carly Bullock, Princeton
Goaltender of the Year		Steph Neatby, Princeton
Mandi Schwartz Student-Athlete of the Year		Paula Voorheis, Cornell
Coach of the Year		Doug Derraugh, Cornell
All-ECAC Teams
First Team	Position	Second Team
Steph Neatby, Princeton	G	Grace Harrison, St. Lawrence
Savannah Harmon, Clarkson	D	Kirsten Padalis, St. Lawrence
Micah Hart, Cornell	D	Kelsey Koelzer, Princeton
Kennedy Marchment, St. Lawrence	F	Genevieve Bannon, Clarkson
Cayley Mercer, Clarkson	F	Karlie Lund, Princeton
Brooke Webster, St. Lawrence	F	Hannah Miller, St. Lawrence
Third Team	Position	Rookie Team
Shea Tiley, Clarkson	G	Steph Neatby, Princeton
Ella Shelton, Clarkson	D	Ella Shelton, Clarkson
Taryn Baumgardt, Quinnipiac	D	Jaime Bourbonnais, Cornell
Hanna Bunton, Cornell	F	Kristin O'Neill, Cornell
Jesse Eldridge, Colgate	F	Carly Bullock, Princeton
Phoebe Stänz, Yale	F	Michaela Pejzlova, Clarkson

=== Patty Kazmaier Award ===
Patty Kazmaier Award Finalists
Player	Position	School
Ann-Renee Desbiens	Goaltender	Wisconsin
Cayley Mercer	Forward	Clarkson Top Three
Lara Stalder	Forward	Minnesota Duluth Top Three
Megan Keller	Defense	Boston College
Kelsey Koelzer	Defense	Princeton
Kennedy Marchment	Forward	St. Lawrence
Annie Pankowski	Forward	Wisconsin
Kelly Pannek	Forward	Minnesota
Sarah Potomak	Forward	Minnesota
Brooke Webster	Forward	St. Lawrence

=== AHCA Coach of the Year ===
AHCA Coach of the Year Finalists
Coach	School
Maura Crowell	Minnesota Duluth
Paul Colontino	Robert Morris
Katie Crowley	Boston College
Bob Deraney	Providence
Doug Derraugh	Cornell
Matt Desrosiers	Clarkson
Brad Frost	Minnesota
Mark Johnson	Wisconsin

=== All-America honors ===
First team		Second team	
Player	School	Player	School
Ann-Renée Desbiens	Wisconsin	Kassidy Sauve	Ohio State
Megan Keller	Minnesota	Savannah Harmon	Clarkson
Lee Stecklein	Minnesota	Jenny Ryan	Wisconsin
Cayley Mercer	Clarkson	Sarah Nurse	Wisconsin
Kelly Pannek	Minnesota	Annie Pankowski	Wisconsin
Lara Stalder	Minnesota Duluth	Brook Webster	St. Lawrence
