= 2016–17 Robert Morris Colonials women's ice hockey season =

Tournament in Pennsylvania

CHA Regular Season Champions CHA Tournament Champions 1st NCAA Tournament appearance, lost to Wisconsin, first round 0–7
- Conference: 1st College Hockey America
- Home ice: 84 Lumber Arena

Rankings
- USA Today/USA Hockey Magazine: 8th
- USCHO.com: 8th

Record
- Overall: 24–5–6
- Conference: 15-3-2
- Home: 11–2–3
- Road: 10–3–2
- Neutral: 3–0–1

Coaches and captains
- Head coach: Paul Colontino (6th season)
- Assistant coaches: Logan Bittle; Chelsea Walkland
- Captain: Rikki Meilleur

The 2016–17 Robert Morris Colonials women's ice hockey season was the twelfth season of the Robert Morris Colonials women's ice hockey program. The team represented Robert Morris University in the College Hockey America (CHA) conference during the 2016–17 NCAA Division I women's ice hockey season. The 2016–17 Colonials were the CHA regular season champions for first time in program history and won the CHA Tournament for the second time. They also appeared in the NCAA Tournament for the first time, falling to Wisconsin in the opening round.

== Offseason ==
- 8/22: Morgan Beikirch (Class of 2008) and Ashley Vesci (Class of 2016) were named to the practice squad of the Buffalo Beauts of the NWHL.

=== Recruiting ===
Player	Position	Nationality	Notes
Jaycee Gephard	Forward	Canada	Was Assistant Captain for Team Canada U18
Aneta Lédlová	Forward	Czech Republic	Two time Gold Medalist for Czech National Team
Emma Low-A-Chee	Forward	Canada	Won PWHL Championship with Toronto Jr. Aeros
Natalie Marcuzzi	Forward	Canada	Played for Mississauga Jr. Chiefs

== Standings ==
2016–17 College Hockey America standings
	Conference							Overall					
	GP	W	L	T	PTS	GF	GA	GP	W	L	T	GF	GA
#8 Robert Morris†*	20	15	3	2	32	60	37	34	24	5	6	106	74
Syracuse	20	14	4	2	30	63	24	34	16	13	5	85	59
Mercyhurst	20	11	8	1	23	58	45	35	15	18	2	92	85
Penn State	20	8	10	2	18	47	54	35	9	21	5	74	104
RIT	20	4	14	2	10	31	59	36	7	27	2	49	116
Lindenwood	20	3	16	1	7	18	58	33	6	25	2	36	100
Championship: Robert Morris † indicates conference regular season champion * indicates conference tournament champion Current rankings: USCHO.com Division I women's poll

- Rankings based on number of wins in the conference

== Roster ==
=== 2016–17 Colonials ===
No.	Nat.	Player	Class	Pos	Height	DoB	Hometown	Previous team
1		Jessica Dodds	Senior	G	5' 7" (1.7 m)		London, Ontario	London Jr. Devilettes
3		Brittany Howard	Junior (RS)	F	5' 4" (1.63 m)		St. Thomas, Ontario	London Jr. Devilettes
4		Kirsten Welsh	Sophomore	D	5' 11" (1.8 m)		Blackstock, Ontario	Whitby Jr. Wolves
7		Victoria Harshman	Sophomore	F	5' 6" (1.68 m)		Owen Sound, Ontario	Etobicoke Jr. Dolphins
8		Sarah Quaranta	Sophomore	F	5' 6" (1.68 m)		Niagara Falls, Ontario	Stoney Creek Jr. Sabres
9		Maggie LaGue	Sophomore	D	5' 8" (1.73 m)		Barre, Vermont	North American Hockey Academy
10		Rikki Meilleur (C)	Senior	F	5' 5" (1.65 m)		St. Adolphe, Manitoba	Shaftesbury Titans
11		Natalie Fraser	Junior	D	5' 6" (1.68 m)		Ottawa, Ontario	Ottawa Jr. Lady Senators
12		Leah Carey	Junior	D	5' 9" (1.75 m)		Middleton, Wisconsin	Madison Capitols
14		Mikaela Lowater	Senior	D	5' 7" (1.7 m)		Thornhill, Ontario	Mississauga Jr. Chiefs
15		Maeve Garvey	Senior	F	5' 4" (1.63 m)		Oakville, Ontario	Burlington Jr. Barracudas
16		Emma Low-A-Chee	Freshman	F	5' 10" (1.78 m)		Toronto, Ontario	Toronto Jr. Aeros
17		Jaycee Gebhard	Freshman	F	5' 3" (1.6 m)		Plenty, Saskatchewan	Team Canada U18
18		Jessica Gazzola	Junior	F	5' 2" (1.57 m)		Thunder Bay, Ontario	Toronto Jr. Aeros
19		Katherine Murphy	Junior	F	5' 3" (1.6 m)		Cary, North Carolina	North American Hockey Academy
20		Caitlyn Sadowsy	Sophomore	F	5' 6" (1.68 m)		Woodbridge, Ontario	Mississauga Jr. Chiefs
23		Amber Rennie	Sophomore	F	5' 3" (1.6 m)		Saskatoon, Saskatchewan	Notre Dame Hounds
25		Aneta Lédlová	Freshman	F	5' 6" (1.68 m)		Kadaň, Czech Republic	Czech National Team
26		Mackenzie Johnston	Senior	F	5' 7" (1.7 m)		Barrie, Ontario	Etobicoke Jr. Dolphins
27		Natalie Marcuzzi	Freshman	F	5' 7" (1.7 m)		Thornhill, Ontario	Mississauga Jr. Chiefs
28		Amanda Pantaleo	Junior	F	5' 5" (1.65 m)		Markham, Ontario	Toronto Jr. Aeros
29		Lauren Bailey	Sophomore	G	5' 9" (1.75 m)		Freeland, Michigan	Choate-Rosemary Hall
31		Elijah Milne-Price	Junior	G	5' 7" (1.7 m)		Mississauga, Ontario	Mississauga Jr. Chiefs

== Schedule ==
Date	Opponent^{#}	Rank^{#}	Site	Decision	Result	Record
Regular Season
October 1	at Providence*		Schneider Arena • Providence, RI	Lauren Bailey	W 3–2	1–0–0
October 2	at Providence*		Schneider Arena • Providence, RI	Jessica Dodds	W 3–2	2–0–0
October 7	Rensselaer*		84 Lumber Arena • Neville Township, PA	Lauren Bailey	W 6–3	3–0–0
October 8	Rensselaer*		84 Lumber Arena • Neville Township, PA	Jessica Dodds	T 1–1 ^{OT}	3–0–1
October 14	Vermont*		84 Lumber Arena • Neville Township, PA	Jessica Dodds	W 3–2	4–0–1
October 15	Vermont*		84 Lumber Arena • Neville Township, PA	Jessica Dodds	T 2–2 ^{OT}	4–0–2
October 21	at Merrimack*		Volpe Complex • North Andover, MA	Lauren Bailey	L 3–4 ^{OT}	4–1–2
October 22	at Merrimack*		Volpe Complex • North Andover, MA	Jessica Dodds	T 3–3 ^{OT}	4–1–3
October 28	Mercyhurst		84 Lumber Arena • Neville Township, PA	Lauren Bailey	W 2–1	5–1–3 (1–0–0)
October 29	Mercyhurst		84 Lumber Arena • Neville Township, PA	Jessica Dodds	W 2–1	6–1–3 (2–0–0)
November 4	Syracuse		84 Lumber Arena • Neville Township, PA	Lauren Bailey	T 2–2 ^{OT}	6–1–4 (2–0–1)
November 5	Syracuse		84 Lumber Arena • Neville Township, PA	Jessica Dodds	W 2–1	7–1–4 (3–0–1)
November 11	at RIT		Gene Polisseni Center • Rochester, NY	Lauren Bailey	W 4–3	8–1–4 (4–0–1)
November 12	at RIT		Gene Polisseni Center • Rochester, NY	Jessica Dodds	W 5–1	9–1–4 (5–0–1)
November 25	vs. #5 Clarkson*		Gutterson Fieldhouse • Burlington, VT (Windjammer Classic, Opening Game)	Jessica Dodds	T 3–3 ^{OT}	9–1–5
November 26	vs. St. Cloud State*		Gutterson Fieldhouse • Burlington, VT (Windjammer Classic, Consolation Game)	Lauren Bailey	W 5–3	10–1–5
December 3	at Penn State		Pegula Ice Arena • University Park, PA	Lauren Bailey	W 4–2	11–1–5 (6–0–1)
December 4	at Penn State		Pegula Ice Arena • University Park, PA	Jessica Dodds	W 6–5	12–1–5 (7–0–1)
December 30	Brown*	#9	84 Lumber Arena • Neville Township, PA	Elijah Milne-Price	W 5–1	13–1–5
December 31	Brown*	#9	84 Lumber Arena • Neville Township, PA	Jessica Dodds	W 5–3	14–1–5
January 13, 2017	Lindenwood	#7	84 Lumber Arena • Neville Township, PA	Lauren Bailey	L 1–2	14–2–5 (7–1–1)
January 14	Lindenwood	#7	84 Lumber Arena • Neville Township, PA	Jessica Dodds	W 5–2	15–2–5 (8–1–1)
January 20	at Mercyhurst	#7	Mercyhurst Ice Center • Erie, PA	Jessica Dodds	W 2–1 ^{OT}	16–2–5 (9–1–1)
January 21	at Mercyhurst	#7	Mercyhurst Ice Center • Erie, PA	Jessica Dodds	T 3–3 ^{OT}	16–2–6 (9–1–2)
January 27	at Syracuse	#7	Tennity Ice Skating Pavilion • Syracuse, NY	Jessica Dodds	W 3–1	17–2–6 (10–1–2)
January 27	at Syracuse	#7	Tennity Ice Skating Pavilion • Syracuse, NY	Jessica Dodds	L 1–5	17–3–6 (10–2–2)
February 10	RIT	#8	84 Lumber Arena • Neville Township, PA	Jessica Dodds	W 4–1	18–3–6 (11–2–2)
February 11	RIT	#8	84 Lumber Arena • Neville Township, PA	Jessica Dodds	W 5–2	19–3–6 (12–2–2)
February 17	Penn State	#8	84 Lumber Arena • Neville Township, PA	Jessica Dodds	L 2–3	19–4–6 (12–3–2)
February 18	Penn State	#8	84 Lumber Arena • Neville Township, PA	Jessica Dodds	W 2–0	20–4–6 (13–3–2)
February 24	at Lindenwood	#9	Lindenwood Ice Arena • Wentzville, MO	Jessica Dodds	W 2–1	21–4–6 (14–3–2)
February 25	at Lindenwood	#9	Lindenwood Ice Arena • Wentzville, MO	Jessica Dodds	W 3–0	22–4–6 (15–3–2)
CHA Tournament
March 3	vs. Lindenwood*	#9	HarborCenter • Buffalo, NY (Semifinal Game)	Jessica Dodds	W 2–1	23–4–6
March 4	vs. Syracuse*	#9	HarborCenter • Buffalo, NY (CHA Championship Game)	Jessica Dodds	W 2–0	24–4–6
NCAA Tournament
March 11	at #1 Wisconsin*	#8	LaBahn Arena • Madison, WI (NCAA Quarterfinals)	Jessica Dodds	L 0–7	24–5–6
*Non-conference game. ^{#}Rankings from USCHO.com Poll.

== Awards and honors ==
- Jaycee Gephard F, October, 2016 CHA Rookie of the Month
- Brittany Howard F, November, 2016 CHA Player of the Month
- Jaycee Gephard F, November, 2016 CHA Rookie of the Month
- Brittany Howard F, December, 2016 CHA Player of the Month
- Jaycee Gephard F, December, 2016 CHA Rookie of the Month
- Jaycee Gephard F, January, 2017 CHA Rookie of the Month
- Brittany Howard F, February, 2017 CHA Player of the Month
- Jaycee Gephard F, February, 2017 CHA Rookie of the Month
- Jaycee Gephard F, February, 2017 Top Rookie in the Nation
- Paul Colontino, CHA Coach of the Year
- Brittany Howard, CHA Player of the Year
- Jaycee Gephard, CHA Rookie of the Year
- Brittany Howard, Forward, CHA First Team All-Star
- Jessica Dodds, Goaltender, CHA First Team All-Star
- Kirsten Welsh, Defender, CHA First Team All-Star
- Jaycee Gephard, Forward, CHA Second Team All-Star
- Jaycee Gephard, Forward, All-CHA Rookie Team

=== Miscellaneous ===
- Paul Colontino reached his 100th coaching win on December 31, 2016, against Brown.
