= 2017 CHA women's ice hockey tournament =

2017 College Hockey America women's ice hockey tournament
- Dates: March 2–4, 2017
- Teams: 6
- Finals site: Harborcenter; Buffalo, New York
- Champions: Robert Morris (2nd title)
- Winning coach: Paul Colontino (2nd title)
- College Hockey America women's Ice Hockey Tournaments

The 2017 College Hockey America Women's Ice Hockey Tournament was the 15th tournament in league history played between March 2 and March 4, 2017, at the Harborcenter in Buffalo, New York. Robert Morris won their second tournament and earned College Hockey America's automatic bid to the 2017 NCAA National Collegiate Women's Ice Hockey Tournament.

== Format ==
The 2017 format was the first single week-end format, with a single game quarterfinal round.

All six CHA Teams participated in the Tournament. On the first day of the Tournament, the top two seeds received a bye, while the #3 seed played the #6 seed, and the #4 seed played the #5 seed in the Quarterfinal round. On the second day, the Semifinal games featured the #1 seed against the lowest remaining seed, while the #2 seed played the highest remaining seed. On the third and final day, the CHA Championship was played between the two Semifinal winners. There was a total of five games.

=== Standings ===
2016–17 College Hockey America standings
	Conference							Overall					
	GP	W	L	T	PTS	GF	GA	GP	W	L	T	GF	GA
#8 Robert Morris†*	20	15	3	2	32	60	37	34	24	5	6	106	74
Syracuse	20	14	4	2	30	63	24	34	16	13	5	85	59
Mercyhurst	20	11	8	1	23	58	45	35	15	18	2	92	85
Penn State	20	8	10	2	18	47	54	35	9	21	5	74	104
RIT	20	4	14	2	10	31	59	36	7	27	2	49	116
Lindenwood	20	3	16	1	7	18	58	33	6	25	2	36	100
Championship: Robert Morris † indicates conference regular season champion * indicates conference tournament champion Current rankings: USCHO.com Division I women's poll

- Rankings based on number of wins in the conference

Round	Match	Name	Team 1		Team 2
1	March 2	Quarterfinal 1 (#3 v. #6)	Mercyhurst 2	v	Lindenwood 3
2	March 2	Quarterfinal 2 (#4 v. #5)	Penn State 1	v	RIT 2
3	March 3	Semifinal 1 (#1 v. #6)	Robert Morris 2	v	Lindenwood 1
4	March 3	Semifinal 2 (#2 v. #5)	Syracuse 4	v	RIT 0
5	March 4	Championship Game	Robert Morris 2	v	Syracuse 0

Tournament Champion: Robert Morris

Note: * denotes overtime period(s)

RMU Goaltender Jessica Dodds was named the Tournament MVP

The Tournament Champion earned a berth in the 2017 NCAA National Collegiate Women's Ice Hockey Tournament to determine the national champion. The Robert Morris Colonials were the number 8 seed out of 8 in the tournament, and lost to #1 seed Wisconsin 7–0 on March 11, in Madison, Wisconsin.
