= 2017 NCAA National Collegiate women's ice hockey tournament =

NCAA women's ice hockey postseason tournament

- 2017 Women's Frozen Four logo
- Teams: 8
- Finals site: Family Arena, St. Charles, Missouri
- Champions: Clarkson Golden Knights (2nd title)
- Runner-up: Wisconsin Badgers (7th title game)
- Semifinalists: Boston College Eagles (7th Frozen Four); Minnesota Golden Gophers (13th Frozen Four)
- Winning coach: Matt Desrosiers (2nd title)
- MOP: Cayley Mercer (Clarkson)
- Attendance: 5,778, 3,016 for Championship Game

The 2017 NCAA National Collegiate Women's Ice Hockey Tournament involved eight schools in single-elimination play to determine the national champion of women's NCAA Division I college ice hockey.

The quarterfinals were contested at the campuses of the seeded teams on March 11, 2017. The Frozen Four was played on March 17 and 19, 2017 at Family Arena in St. Charles, Missouri with Lindenwood University as the host. Robert Morris reached the NCAA tournament for the first time in program history.

The tournament was won by Clarkson with a 3–0 win over Wisconsin, giving the Golden Knights their second title in program history.

== Qualifying teams ==
2017 Qualifying Teams
WCHA, ECAC, Hockey East, CHA

In the third year under this qualification format, the winners of all four Division I conference tournaments received automatic berths to the NCAA tournament.

The other four teams were selected at-large. The top four teams were then seeded and received home ice for the quarterfinals.

Seed	School	Conference	Record	Berth type	Appearance	Last bid
1	Wisconsin	WCHA	31–2–4	Tournament champion	11th	2016
2	Clarkson	ECAC	29–4–5	Tournament champion	6th	2016
3	Minnesota Duluth	WCHA	25–6–5	At-large bid	11th	2011
4	Boston College	Hockey East	27–5–5	Tournament champion	9th	2016
	St. Lawrence	ECAC	26–5–4	At-large bid	9th	2012
	Minnesota	WCHA	25–7–5	At-large bid	15th	2016
	Cornell	ECAC	20–8–5	At-large bid	6th	2014
	Robert Morris	CHA	24–4–6	Tournament champion	1st	Never

== Bracket ==
Quarterfinals held at home sites of seeded teams

National Quarterfinals; March 11
1	Wisconsin	7
Robert Morris	0
4	Boston College	6
St. Lawrence	0
2	Clarkson	3
Cornell	1
3	Minnesota–Duluth	0
Minnesota	1

National Semifinals; March 17
1	Wisconsin	1
4	Boston College	0
2	Clarkson	4
Minnesota	3

National Championship; March 19
1	Wisconsin	0
2	Clarkson	3

Note: * denotes overtime period(s)

== Results ==
=== National Quarterfinals ===
==== (1) Wisconsin vs. Robert Morris ====
March 11; 2:07	Robert Morris	0–7 (0–2, 0–4, 0–1)	Wisconsin	LaBahn Arena; Attendance: 2,423

Game reference

Jessica Dodds
Lauren Bailey
Goalies
Ann-Renée Desbiens
Referees:
Robert Ludwig
Shaqne Paskey
Linesmen:
Ron Laituri
Josh Brown

0–1	1:48 – Steffen (Wellhausen, Williams)
0–2	13:43 – Nurse (Pankowski, Ryan)
0–3	27:26 – Wellhausen (Shaver, Steffen)
0–4	28:34 – Rolfes (Nurse)
0–5	33:27 – pp –Pankowski – (Nurse, Steffen)
0–6	38:16 – Clark
0–7	56:35 – Clark – (Norby)

8 min
Penalties
8 min
22
Shots
49

==== (4) Boston College vs. St. Lawrence ====
March 11; 1:00	St. Lawrence	0–6 (0–1, 0–4, 0–1)	Boston College	Conte Forum; Attendance: 674

Game reference

Grace Harrison
Sonjia Shelly
Goalies
Kaitlin Burt
Referees:
Katie Guay
William Harrup
Linesmen:
Peter Terreri
James Curtin

0–1	18:36 – Kent (Newkirk, Flanagan)
0–2	21:51 – Capizzano (Lonergan, Belinskas)
0–3	25:56 – Anastos (Kent, Flanagan)
0–4	34:54 – McLean (Little)
0–5	39:58 – Keller (McLean)
0–6	49:49 – Newkirk (Kent, Anastos)

10 min
Penalties
6 min
24
Shots
28

==== (2) Clarkson vs. Cornell ====
March 11; 3:00	Cornell	1–3 (0–1, 0–0, 1–2)	Clarkson	Cheel Arena; Attendance: 1,266

Game reference

Paula Voorheis
Goalies
Shea Tiley
Referees:
Tom Quinn
Rick Santilli
Linesmen:
Paul Sacco
Tim Daly

	0–1	12:25 – pp – Gabel (Shelton, Harmon)
	0–2	58:21 – Gabel (Mercer, Bannon)
Serdar (Bourbonnais, Bunton) – 58:33	1–2
	1–3	59:32 – Gabel (Bannon, Shelton)

12 min
Penalties
2 min
23
Shots
37

==== (3) Minnesota-Duluth vs. Minnesota ====
March 11; 2:30	Minnesota	1–0 (0–0, 0–0, 1–0)	Minnesota Duluth	AMSOIL Arena; Attendance: 1,549

Game reference
Sidney Peters	Goalies	Maddie Rooney	Referees: Scott Roth; Casey Enge; Linesmen: Mike Kaehler; Glendon Seal
47:54 – Marshall (Pannek, Potomak) / 1–0			Referees: Scott Roth; Casey Enge; Linesmen: Mike Kaehler; Glendon Seal
2 min	Penalties	4 min	Referees: Scott Roth; Casey Enge; Linesmen: Mike Kaehler; Glendon Seal
29	Shots	25	Referees: Scott Roth; Casey Enge; Linesmen: Mike Kaehler; Glendon Seal

=== National Semifinals ===
==== (1) Wisconsin vs. (4) Boston College ====
March 17; 5:00	Boston College	0–1 (0–0, 0–0, 0–1)	Wisconsin	Family Arena

Game reference
Kaitlin Burt	Goalies	Ann-Renée Desbiens	Referees: Katie Guay; Will Harrop; Linesmen: Jim Curtin; Brandon Vigorito
0–1 / 19:43 – Channell (Pankowski, Roque)			Referees: Katie Guay; Will Harrop; Linesmen: Jim Curtin; Brandon Vigorito
8 min	Penalties	6 min	Referees: Katie Guay; Will Harrop; Linesmen: Jim Curtin; Brandon Vigorito
22	Shots	36	Referees: Katie Guay; Will Harrop; Linesmen: Jim Curtin; Brandon Vigorito

==== (2) Clarkson vs. Minnesota ====
March 17; 8:05	Minnesota	3–4 (1–1, 1–1, 1–2)	Clarkson	Family Arena; Attendance: 2,762

Game reference

Sidney Peters
Goalies
Shea Tiley
Referees:
Tom Quinn
Rick Santilli
Linesmen:
Paul Sacco
Tim Daley

	0–1	12:55 – Bannon (Harmon, Shelton)
Schipper (Reilly) – 17:54	1–1
	1–2	31:21 – Gabel (Bannon, Mercer)
Potomak (Pannek, Baldwin) – 39:00	2–2
	2–3	44:58 – Harmon (McGill, Titus)
Skarzynski (Agnew) – 54:57	3–3
	3–4	58:29 – McGill (Mercer, Bannon)

2 min
Penalties
0 min
31
Shots
25

=== National Championship ===
==== (1) Wisconsin vs. (2) Clarkson ====
March 19; 2:03	Clarkson	3–0 (0–0, 1–0, 2–0)	Wisconsin	Family Arena; Attendance: 3,016

Game reference

Shea Tiley
Goalies
Ann-Renée Desbiens
Referees:
Tom Quinn
Rick Santilli
Linesmen:
Tim Daley
Paul Sacco

Harmon (Bannon, Shelton) – pp – 20:27	1–0
Mercer (Gabel, Bannon) – 56:56	2–0
Mercer – 59:16	3–0

4 min
Penalties
6 min
20
Shots
41

== Media ==
=== Television ===
An agreement with the Big Ten Network resulted in the championship game being televised for the first time since 2010.

==== Broadcast assignments ====
Women's Frozen Four

- Scott Sudikoff (NCAA.com)

Championship

- Dan Kelly, Sonny Watrous, and Sara Dayley (BTN)

== Tournament awards ==
=== All-Tournament Team ===
- G: Ann-Renée Desbiens, Wisconsin
- D: Mellissa Channell, Wisconsin
- D: Savannah Harmon, Clarkson
- F: Geneviève Bannon, Clarkson
- F: Cayley Mercer*, Clarkson
- F: Annie Pankowski, Wisconsin

* Most Outstanding Player

== See also ==
- 2017 NCAA Division I Men's Ice Hockey Tournament
