= 2016–17 Mercyhurst Lakers women's ice hockey season =

- Conference: 3rd College Hockey America
- Home ice: Mercyhurst Ice Center

Record
- Overall: 15-18-2
- Conference: 11-8-1
- Home: 6-8-2
- Road: 8-8-0
- Neutral: 1-2-0

Coaches and captains
- Head coach: Michael Sisti (18th season)
- Assistant coaches: Louis Goulet; Lyndsay Barch
- Captain: Paige Horton
- Alternate captain(s): Morgan Stacey, Sarah McDonnell, Jill Skinner

The Mercyhurst Lakers represent Mercyhurst University in CHA women's ice hockey during the 2016-17 NCAA Division I women's ice hockey season.

== Standings ==
2016–17 College Hockey America standings
	Conference							Overall					
	GP	W	L	T	PTS	GF	GA	GP	W	L	T	GF	GA
#8 Robert Morris†*	20	15	3	2	32	60	37	34	24	5	6	106	74
Syracuse	20	14	4	2	30	63	24	34	16	13	5	85	59
Mercyhurst	20	11	8	1	23	58	45	35	15	18	2	92	85
Penn State	20	8	10	2	18	47	54	35	9	21	5	74	104
RIT	20	4	14	2	10	31	59	36	7	27	2	49	116
Lindenwood	20	3	16	1	7	18	58	33	6	25	2	36	100
Championship: Robert Morris † indicates conference regular season champion * indicates conference tournament champion Current rankings: USCHO.com Division I women's poll

- Rankings based on number of wins in the conference

== Offseason ==
- May 17: Emily Janiga, 2015-16 team captain signed with the Buffalo Beauts of the NWHL.

[3]

- September 20: Lyndsay Barch (Mercyhurst '04) was hired as an associate head coach.

=== Recruiting ===
Player	Position	Nationality	Notes
Maggie Knott	Forward	Canada	Played with Ottawa Jr. Lady Senators
Sam Isbell	Forward	Canada	From Thunder Bay, Ontario
Claire Werynski	Defense	United States	Attended Gilmour Academy
Michele Robillard	Forward	United States	Played on Nichols School squad
Nicole Guagliardi	Forward	United States	Played with Barrington (IL) High School
Celine Frappier	Forward	Canada	Played for Toronto Jr. Aeros

== Roster ==
=== 2016–17 Lakers ===
No.	Nat.	Player	Class	Pos	Height	DoB	Hometown	Previous team
2		Samantha Fieseler	Sophomore (RS)	D	5' 6" (1.68 m)		Kelowna, British Columbia	Pursuit of Excellence Academy
4		Maggie Knott	Freshman	F	5' 11" (1.8 m)		Smith Falls, Ontario	Ottawa Jr. Lady Senators
5		Sam Isbell	Freshman	F	5' 7" (1.7 m)		Thunder Bay, Ontario	Whitby Jr. Wolves
6		Taylor Accursi	Senior	F	5' 8" (1.73 m)		Ancaster, Ontario	Burlington Barracudas
8		Molly Blasen	Sophomore	D	5' 7" (1.7 m)		Okemos, Michigan	Honeybaked
10		Megan Whiddon	Senior	F	5' 5" (1.65 m)		Corona, California	National Sports Academy
11		Jennifer MacAskill	Junior	F	5' 5" (1.65 m)		Auld's Cove, Nova Scotia	Oakville Jr. Hornets
13		Claire Werynski	Freshman	D	5' 7" (1.7 m)		Williamsville, New York	Gilmour Academy
14		Rachael Smith	Sophomore	F	5' 8" (1.73 m)		Stoney Creek, Ontario	Stoney Creek Sabres
15		Paige Horton (A)	Senior	F	5' 11" (1.8 m)		St. Thomas, Ontario	London Jr. Devilettes
16		Michele Robillard	Freshman	F	5' 7" (1.7 m)		Orchard Park, New York	Nichols School
18		Nicole Guagliardo	Freshman	F	5' 8" (1.73 m)		Hoffman Estates, Illinois	Barrington HS
19		Sarah Robello	Junior	F	5' 4" (1.63 m)		Las Vegas, Nevada	Boston Shamrocks
21		Callie Paddock	Junior	D	6' 1" (1.85 m)		Wawa, Ontario	St. Mary's Academy
22		Nicole Collier	Sophomore	D	5' 6" (1.68 m)		Oakville, Ontario	Stoney Creek Sabres
23		Morgan Stacey (A)	Sophomore	F	5' 5" (1.65 m)		Commerce Township, Michigan	Honeybaked
24		Celine Frappier	Freshman	F	5' 4" (1.63 m)		Tecumseh, Ontario	Toronto Jr. Aeros
25		Jillian Skinner (A)	Senior	D	5' 6" (1.68 m)		Markham, Ontario	Mississauga Jr. Chiefs
26		Sarah Hine	Sophomore	F	5' 4" (1.63 m)		Hamilton, Ontario	Stoney Creek Sabres
27		Brooke Hartwick	Junior	F	5' 7" (1.7 m)		London, Ontario	Brampton Jr. Canadettes
30		Sarah McDonnell (A)	Sophomore	G	5' 5" (1.65 m)		Oakville, Ontario	Stoney Creek Sabres
37		Jessica Convery	Junior	G	5' 7" (1.7 m)		Commerce Township, Michigan	Honeybaked

== Schedule ==
Date	Opponent^{#}	Rank^{#}	Site	Decision	Result	Record
Regular Season
September 30	#6 North Dakota*		Mercyhurst Ice Center • Erie, PA	Sarah McDonnell	L 1–3	0–1–0
October 1	#6 North Dakota*		Mercyhurst Ice Center • Erie, PA	Jessica Convery	T 1–1 ^{OT}	0–1–1
October 14	#2 Quinnipiac*		Mercyhurst Ice Center • Erie, PA	Jessica Convery	W 3–2	1–1–1
October 15	#2 Quinnipiac*		Mercyhurst Ice Center • Erie, PA	Jessica Convery	L 0–1 ^{OT}	1–2–1
October 21	at Cornell*		Lynah Rink • Ithaca, NY	Sarah McDonnell	L 1–3	1–3–1
October 22	at Cornell*		Lynah Rink • Ithaca, NY	Jessica Convery	L 1–2	1–4–1
October 28	at Robert Morris		84 Lumber Arena • Neville Township, PA	Jessica Convery	L 1–2	1–5–1 (0–1–0)
October 29	at Robert Morris		84 Lumber Arena • Neville Township, PA	Sarah McDonnell	L 1–2	1–6–1 (0–2–0)
November 4	Penn State		Mercyhurst Ice Center • Erie, PA	Sarah McDonnell	W 6–4	2–6–1 (1–2–0)
November 5	Penn State		Mercyhurst Ice Center • Erie, PA	Sarah McDonnell	L 2–3	2–7–1 (1–3–0)
November 11	Syracuse		Mercyhurst Ice Center • Erie, PA	Sarah McDonnell	L 2–4	2–8–1 (1–4–0)
November 12	Syracuse		Mercyhurst Ice Center • Erie, PA	Jessica Convery	W 4–3	3–8–1 (2–4–0)
November 18	at Rensselaer*		Houston Field House • Troy, NY	Jessica Convery	W 4–1	4–8–1
November 19	at Rensselaer*		Houston Field House • Troy, NY	Sarah McDonnell	W 7–1	5–8–1
November 22	Colgate*		Mercyhurst Ice Center • Erie, PA	Jessica Convery	L 2–4	5–9–1
November 23	Colgate*		Mercyhurst Ice Center • Erie, PA	Sarah McDonnell	L 1–5	5–10–1
December 2	at Lindenwood		Lindenwood Ice Arena • Wentzville, MO	Jessica Convery	W 4–0	6–10–1 (3–4–0)
December 3	at Lindenwood		Lindenwood Ice Arena • Wentzville, MO	Jessica Convery	L 1–3	6–11–1 (3–5–0)
December 10	at Princeton*		Hobey Baker Memorial Rink • Princeton, NJ	Jessica Convery	L 2–4	6–12–1
December 11	at Princeton*		Hobey Baker Memorial Rink • Princeton, NJ	Sarah McDonnell	L 2–5	6–13–1
January 7, 2017	vs. #4 St. Lawrence*		Kettler Capitals Iceplex • Arlington, VA (DI in DC)	Jessica Convery	W 5–2	7–13–1
January 8	vs. #4 St. Lawrence*		Kettler Capitals Iceplex • Arlington, VA (DI in DC)	Jessica Convery	L 2–3	7–14–1
January 13	RIT		Mercyhurst Ice Center • Erie, PA	Jessica Convery	W 5–2	8–14–1 (4–5–0)
January 14	RIT		Mercyhurst Ice Center • Erie, PA	Jessica Convery	L 0–4	8–15–1 (4–6–0)
January 20	#7 Robert Morris		Mercyhurst Ice Center • Erie, PA	Jessica Convery	L 1–2 ^{OT}	8–16–1 (4–7–0)
January 21	#7 Robert Morris		Mercyhurst Ice Center • Erie, PA	Sarah McDonnell	T 3–3 ^{OT}	8–16–2 (4–7–1)
January 27	at Penn State		Pegula Ice Arena • University Park, PA	Sarah McDonnell	W 6–0	9–16–2 (5–7–1)
January 28	at Penn State		Pegula Ice Arena • University Park, PA	Sarah McDonnell	W 4–3	10–16–2 (6–7–1)
February 10	at Syracuse		Tennity Ice Skating Pavilion • Syracuse, NY	Sarah McDonnell	L 0–3	10–17–2 (6–8–1)
February 11	at Syracuse		Tennity Ice Skating Pavilion • Syracuse, NY	Jessica Convery	W 3–2	11–17–2 (7–8–1)
February 17	Lindenwood		Mercyhurst Ice Center • Erie, PA	Jessica Convery	W 3–2	12–17–2 (8–8–1)
February 18	Lindenwood		Mercyhurst Ice Center • Erie, PA	Sarah McDonnell	W 5–1	13–17–2 (9–8–1)
February 24	at RIT		Gene Polisseni Center • Rochester, NY	Jessica Convery	W 3–2	14–17–2 (10–8–1)
February 25	at RIT		Gene Polisseni Center • Rochester, NY	Sarah McDonnell	W 4–0	15–17–2 (11–8–1)
CHA Tournament
March 2	vs. Lindenwood*		HarborCenter • Buffalo, NY	Jessica Convery	L 2–3	15–18–2
*Non-conference game. ^{#}Rankings from USCHO.com Poll.

== Awards and honors ==
- Jessica Convery, CHA Goaltender of the month, December, 2016

- Brooke Hartwick, Forward, All-CHA Second Team

- Jillian Skinner, Defender, All-CHA Second Team
- Maggie Knott, Forward, All-CHA Rookie Team
