= 2016–17 Quinnipiac Bobcats women's ice hockey season =

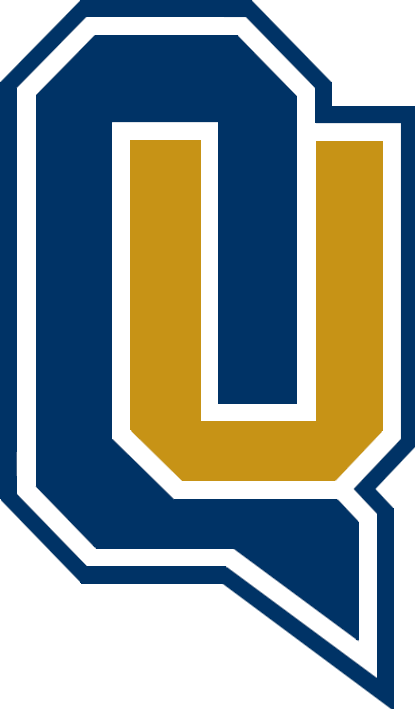
- Conference: 5th ECAC
- Home ice: High Point Solutions Arena at TD Bank Sports Center, Hamden, CT

Record
- Overall: 21-10-6
- Home: 10-4-3
- Road: 11-6-3
- Neutral: 1-0-0

Coaches and captains
- Head coach: Cassandra Turner
- Assistant coaches: Amanda Mazzotta; Eddie Ardito
- Captain: Emma Woods

The Quinnipiac Bobcats program represented Quinnipiac University during the 2016-17 NCAA Division I women's ice hockey season.

== Offseason ==
- Taylar Cianfarano, Melissa Samoskevich, and Kenzie Prater were invited to the Team USA Development Camp, while Sarah-Eve Coutu-Godbout was invited to the Team Canada Camp.

=== Recruiting ===
Player	Position	Nationality	Notes
Allison Roethke	Defense	United States	Older sister, Lindsay Roethke plays for Connecticut
Sarah-Eve Coutu-Godbout	Forward	Canada	IIHF Gold Medalist with Team Canada U18
Abbie Ives	Goaltender	United States	Minded net with the New Jersey Colonials
Kati Tabin	Defense	Canada	Played for Cambridge Jr. Rivulettes
Kenzie Prater	Forward	United States	Named to Team USA U18
Abby Cleary	Forward	United States	Attended Shattuck-St. Mary's

== 2016–17 Bobcats ==
No.	Nat.	Player	Class	Pos	Height	DoB	Hometown	Previous team
1		Claire Lachner	Sophomore	G	5' 5" (1.65 m)		Commerce, Michigan	Little Caesars U19
4		Kate MacKenzie	Freshman	D	5' 9" (1.75 m)		Winnipeg, Manitoba	Team Manitoba
6		Meghan Turner	Senior	F	5' 6" (1.68 m)		Bedford, New Hampshire	Assabet Valley
7		Kati Tabin	Freshman	D	5' 8" (1.73 m)		Winnipeg, Manitoba	Cambridge Jr. Rivulettes
8		Tori DeAngelis	Junior	F	5' 8" (1.73 m)		Saunderstown, Rhode Island	Assabet Valley
9		Alicia Barry	Junior	D	5' 9" (1.75 m)		Hanson, Massachusetts	Assabet Valley
10		Taryn Baumgardt	Senior	D	5' 7" (1.7 m)		Innisfail, Alberta	Team Canada U18
11		Melissa Samoskevich	Sophomore	F	5' 4" (1.63 m)		Sandy Hook, Connecticut	Team USA U18
12		Danielle Marmer	Senior	F	5' 6" (1.68 m)		Dorset, Vermont	Connecticut Polar Bears
13		Kenzie Lancaster	Sophomore	F	5' 8" (1.73 m)		Waxhaw, North Carolina	Pittsburgh Penguins Elite U19
16		Allison Roethke	Freshman	D	5' 4" (1.63 m)		Buffalo, Minnesota	Buffalo HS
17		Abby Cleary	Freshman	F	5' 8" (1.73 m)		Buffalo, New York	Shattuck-St. Mary's
18		Emma Woods (C)	Senior	F	5' 7" (1.7 m)		Burford, Ontario	Team Ontario Red
19		Shannon Cherpak	Junior	D	5' 7" (1.7 m)		Enfield, Connecticut	Team Pittsburgh U19
21		Kenzie Prater	Freshman	F	5' 5" (1.65 m)		Hudson, Wisconsin	Team USA U18
22		Taylar Cianfarano	Junior	F	5' 5" (1.65 m)		Oswego, New York	Team USA U18
23		Raquel Pennoyer	Junior	F	5' 4" (1.63 m)		Rehoboth, Massachusetts	Massachusetts Spitfires
24		Sarah-Eve Couto-Godbout	Freshman	F	5' 7" (1.7 m)		Rouyn-Noranda, Quebec	Team Canada U18
25		Emma Greco	Senior	D	5' 9" (1.75 m)		Burlington, Ontario	Team Ontario Red
26		Mika Nervick	Senior	F	5' 4" (1.63 m)		Lakeville, Minnesota	Shattuck-St. Mary's
29		Randi Marcon	Sophomore	F	5' 11" (1.8 m)		Winnipeg, Manitoba	Team Manitoba
34		Sydney Rossman	Senior	G	5' 5" (1.65 m)		Excelsior, Minnesota	Minnesota Jr. Whitecaps
35		Abbie Ives	Freshman	G	5' 10" (1.78 m)		Bedford Hills, New York	New Jersey Colonials

== Schedule ==
Date	Opponent^{#}	Rank^{#}	Site	Decision	Result	Record
Regular Season
September 30	Maine*	#4	High Point Solutions Arena • Hamden, CT	Sydney Rossman	W 5–4	1–0–0
October 1	Maine*	#4	High Point Solutions Arena • Hamden, CT	Sydney Rossman	W 3–0	2–0–0
October 7	at Connecticut*	#3	Freitas Ice Forum • Storrs, CT	Sydney Rossman	W 3–0	3–0–0
October 8	at New Hampshire*	#3	Whittemore Center • Durham, NH	Sydney Rossman	W 3–0	4–0–0
October 14	at Mercyhurst*	#2	Mercyhurst Ice Center • Erie, PA	Sydney Rossman	L 2–3	4–1–0
October 15	at Mercyhurst*	#2	Mercyhurst Ice Center • Erie, PA	Sydney Rossman	W 1–0 ^{OT}	5–1–0
October 21	at #6 Boston College*	#3	Kelley Rink • Chestnut Hill, MA	Sydney Rossman	T 0–0 ^{OT}	5–1–1
October 22	#6 Boston College*	#3	High Point Solutions Arena • Hamden, CT	Sydney Rossman	L 1–4	5–2–1
October 28	at Yale	#5	Ingalls Rink • New Haven, CT	Sydney Rossman	W 4–1	6–2–1 (1–0–0)
October 29	at Brown	#5	Meehan Auditorium • Providence, RI	Sydney Rossman	W 8–0	7–2–1 (2–0–0)
November 4	#8 Clarkson	#5	High Point Solutions Arena • Hamden, CT	Sydney Rossman	L 1–4	7–3–1 (2–1–0)
November 5	#7 St. Lawrence	#5	High Point Solutions Arena • Hamden, CT	Sydney Rossman	L 0–1	7–4–1 (2–2–0)
November 11	at Dartmouth	#8	Thompson Arena • Hanover, NH	Sydney Rossman	W 2–1	8–4–1 (3–2–0)
November 12	at Harvard	#8	Bright-Landry Hockey Center • Allston, MA	Sydney Rossman	W 2–1	9–4–1 (4–2–0)
November 18	Cornell	#8	High Point Solutions Arena • Hamden, CT	Abbie Ives	T 3–3 ^{OT}	9–4–2 (4–2–1)
November 19	#5 Colgate	#8	High Point Solutions Arena • Hamden, CT	Abbie Ives	W 3–1	10–4–2 (5–2–1)
November 25	Merrimack*	#8	High Point Solutions Arena • Hamden, CT (Nutmeg Classic, Opening Game)	Sydney Rossman	T 1–1 ^{OT}	10–4–3
November 26	Connecticut*	#8	High Point Solutions Arena • Hamden, CT (Nutmeg Classic, Consolation Game)	Sydney Rossman	W 3–2	11–4–3
December 2	at Union	#8	Achilles Center • Schenectady, NY	Abbie Ives	W 4–0	12–4–3 (6–2–1)
December 3	at Rensselaer	#8	Houston Field House • Troy, NY	Sydney Rossman	W 6–1	13–4–3 (7–2–1)
December 30	Penn State*	#8	High Point Solutions Arena • Hamden, CT	Sydney Rossman	W 2–1	14–4–3
January 1, 2017	at Princeton	#8	Hobey Baker Memorial Rink • Princeton, NJ	Sydney Rossman	L 2–3	14–5–3 (7–3–1)
January 6	Harvard	#8	High Point Solutions Arena • Hamden, CT	Sydney Rossman	T 2–2 ^{OT}	14–5–4 (7–3–2)
January 7	Dartmouth	#8	High Point Solutions Arena • Hamden, CT	Sydney Rossman	W 3–1	15–5–4 (8–3–2)
January 13	at #8 Colgate	#9	Class of 1965 Arena • Hamilton, NY	Sydney Rossman	W 2–0	16–5–4 (9–3–2)
January 14	at Cornell	#9	Lynah Rink • Ithaca, NY	Sydney Rossman	L 2–3 ^{OT}	16–6–4 (9–4–2)
January 20	at Merrimack*	#8	Volpe Complex • North Andover, MA	Sydney Rossman	T 2–2 ^{OT}	16–6–5
January 31	#9 Princeton	#10	High Point Solutions Arena • Hamden, CT	Sydney Rossman	L 0–3	16–7–5 (9–5–2)
February 3	Brown	#10	High Point Solutions Arena • Hamden, CT	Abbie Ives	W 9–0	17–7–5 (10–5–2)
February 4	Yale	#10	High Point Solutions Arena • Hamden, CT	Sydney Rossman	W 4–1	18–7–5 (11–5–2)
February 4	Yale	#10	High Point Solutions Arena • Hamden, CT	Sydney Rossman	W 4–1	18–7–5 (11–5–2)
February 11	at #3 St. Lawrence	#9	Appleton Arena • Canton, NY	Sydney Rossman	T 1–1 ^{OT}	18–7–6 (11–5–3)
February 12	at #4 Clarkson	#9	Cheel Arena • Potsdam, NY	Sydney Rossman	L 0–1	18–8–6 (11–6–3)
February 17	Rensselaer	#10	High Point Solutions Arena • Hamden, CT	Sydney Rossman	W 5–0	19–8–6 (12–6–3)
February 18	Union	#10	High Point Solutions Arena • Hamden, CT	Sydney Rossman	W 1–0	20–8–6 (13–6–3)
ECAC Tournament
February 24	at #8 Princeton*	#10	Hobey Baker Memorial Rink • Princeton, NJ (Quarterfinals, Game 1)	Sydney Rossman	W 3–2 ^{3OT}	21–8–6
February 25	at #8 Princeton*	#10	Hobey Baker Memorial Rink • Princeton, NJ (Quarterfinals, Game 2)	Sydney Rossman	L 0–2	21–9–6
February 26	at #8 Princeton*	#10	Hobey Baker Memorial Rink • Princeton, NJ (Quarterfinals, Game 3)	Sydney Rossman	L 1–2	21–10–6
*Non-conference game. ^{#}Rankings from USCHO.com Poll.

== Awards and honors ==
- Taryn Baumgardt, Defense, All-ECAC Third Team
