= 2016–17 Syracuse Orange women's ice hockey season =

- Conference: 2nd College Hockey America
- Home ice: Tennity Ice Skating Pavilion

Record
- Overall: 16-13-5
- Conference: 14-4-2
- Home: 7-5-2
- Road: 8-7-3
- Neutral: 1-1-0

Coaches and captains
- Head coach: Paul Flanagan 9th season
- Assistant coaches: Alison Domenico; Brendon Knight
- Captain: Jessica Sibley
- Alternate captain(s): Emily Costales, Larissa Martyniuk

The Syracuse Orange women represented Syracuse University in CHA women's ice hockey during the 2016-17 NCAA Division I women's ice hockey season. They came in second in their conference and reached the conference championship game before falling to Robert Morris.

== Offseason ==
- July 21: Allie Munroe was invited to The Team Canada Development Camp in Calgary.

=== Recruiting ===
Player	Position	Nationality	Notes
Amanda Bäckebo	Defense	Sweden	Played with Swedish National Team U18
Ady Cohen	Goaltender	United States	Studied at Gilmour Academy
Logan Hicks	Defense	United States	Competed with St. Louis Lady Blues
Alexandra Olnowich	Defense	United States	Attended Lawrenceville School
Savannah Rennie	Forward	Canada	Played for the Shaftesbury Jr. Titans
Kelli Rowswell	Forward	Canada	Played for the Manitoba U18
Brooke Avery	Forward	United States	Sophomore transfer from UNH

== Standings ==
2016–17 College Hockey America standings
	Conference							Overall					
	GP	W	L	T	PTS	GF	GA	GP	W	L	T	GF	GA
#8 Robert Morris†*	20	15	3	2	32	60	37	34	24	5	6	106	74
Syracuse	20	14	4	2	30	63	24	34	16	13	5	85	59
Mercyhurst	20	11	8	1	23	58	45	35	15	18	2	92	85
Penn State	20	8	10	2	18	47	54	35	9	21	5	74	104
RIT	20	4	14	2	10	31	59	36	7	27	2	49	116
Lindenwood	20	3	16	1	7	18	58	33	6	25	2	36	100
Championship: Robert Morris † indicates conference regular season champion * indicates conference tournament champion Current rankings: USCHO.com Division I women's poll

- Rankings based on number of wins in the conference

== Roster ==
=== 2016–17 Orange ===
No.	Nat.	Player	Class	Pos	Height	DoB	Hometown	Previous team
2		Logan Hicks	Freshman	D	5' 9" (1.75 m)		Scottsdale, Arizona	St. Louis Lady Blues
3		Amanda Bäckebo	Freshman	D	5' 3" (1.6 m)		Ganef, Sweden	Swedish National Team U18
4		Lindsay Eastwood	Freshman (RS)	D	6' 1" (1.85 m)		Kanata, Ontario	Team Canada U18
7		Jessica Sibley (C)	Senior	F	5' 5" (1.65 m)		Luseland, Saskatchewan	Team Saskatchewan U18
8		Stephanie Grossi	Junior	F	5' 2" (1.57 m)		Winnipeg, Manitoba	Team Manitoba U18
9		Allie Munroe	Sophomore	D	5' 7" (1.7 m)		Yarmouth, Nova Scotia	New Hampton
10		Morgan Blank	Senior	F	5' 3" (1.6 m)		Fort Mitchell, Kentucky	Pittsburgh Penguins Elite
11		Emily Costales (A)	Junior	F	5' 4" (1.63 m)		Vancouver, British Columbia	Team British Columbia U18
13		Karleigh Scully	Sophomore	F	5' 7" (1.7 m)		Pointe Claire, Quebec	Nepean Jr. Wildcats
14		Savannah Rennie	Freshman	F	5' 7" (1.7 m)		East St. Paul, Manitoba	Team Manitoba U18
15		Sarah Stuehr	Sophomore	F	5' 4" (1.63 m)		Westwood, Massachusetts	Warner Hockey School
16		Kelli Rowswell	Freshman	F	5' 9" (1.75 m)		Winnipeg, Manitoba	Team Manitoba U18
17		Larissa Martyniuk (A)	Senior	D	5' 6" (1.68 m)		Winnipeg, Manitoba	Team Manitoba U18
18		Allie Olnowich	Freshman	D	5' 7" (1.7 m)		Chatham, New Jersey	New Jersey Rockets
19		Dakota Derrer	Junior	D	5' 7" (1.7 m)		Mancelona, Michigan	Traverse City-St. Francis
20		Alysha Burriss	Junior	F	5' 6" (1.68 m)		Napanee, Ontario	Team Ontario Blue U18
21		Brooke Avery	Junior (RS)	F	5' 10" (1.78 m)		Concord, New Hampshire	New Hampshire
22		Laurence Porlier	Senior	F	5' 9" (1.75 m)		Maria, Quebec	Brewster Academy
23		Megan Quinn	Junior	D	5' 9" (1.75 m)		Belleville, Ontario	Team Ontario Red U18
27		Heather Schwartz	Senior	F	5' 7" (1.7 m)		Naugatuck, Connecticut	Boston Shamrocks
29		Abbey Miller	Junior	G	5' 8" (1.73 m)		Anoka, Minnesota	Benilde-St. Margaret's
30		Maddi Welch	Sophomore	G	5' 7" (1.7 m)		East Amherst, New York	Niagara Jr. Purple Eagles
32		Ady Cohen	Freshman	G	5' 6" (1.68 m)		Boynton Beach, Florida	Gilmour Academy

== Schedule ==
Date	Opponent^{#}	Rank^{#}	Site	Decision	Result	Record
Regular Season
September 30	Bemidji State*		Tennity Ice Skating Pavilion • Syracuse, NY	Abbey Miller	L 1–3	0–1–0
October 1	Bemidji State*		Tennity Ice Skating Pavilion • Syracuse, NY	Maddi Welch	L 0–3	0–2–0
October 14	at Northeastern*		Matthews Arena • Boston, MA	Abbey Miller	T 2–2 ^{OT}	0–2–1
October 15	at Northeastern*		Matthews Arena • Boston, MA	Abbey Miller	L 0–1	0–3–1
October 21	#5 Colgate*		Tennity Ice Skating Pavilion • Syracuse, NY	Abbey Miller	L 2–3	0–4–1
October 22	at #5 Colgate*		Starr Rink • Hamilton, NY	Abbey Miller	T 2–2 ^{OT}	0–4–2
October 28	Lindenwood		Tennity Ice Skating Pavilion • Syracuse, NY	Abbey Miller	W 4–0	1–4–2 (1–0–0)
October 29	Lindenwood		Tennity Ice Skating Pavilion • Syracuse, NY	Abbey Miller	W 4–0	2–4–2 (2–0–0)
November 4	at Robert Morris		84 Lumber Arena • Neville Township, PA	Abbey Miller	T 2–2 ^{OT}	2–4–3 (2–0–1)
November 5	at Robert Morris		84 Lumber Arena • Neville Township, PA	Abbey Miller	L 1–2	2–5–3 (2–1–1)
November 11	at Mercyhurst		Mercyhurst Ice Center • Erie, PA	Abbey Miller	W 4–2	3–5–3 (3–1–1)
November 12	at Mercyhurst		Mercyhurst Ice Center • Erie, PA	Abbey Miller	L 3–4	3–6–3 (3–2–1)
November 25	at #7 North Dakota*		Ralph Engelstad Arena • Grand Forks, ND	Abbey Miller	W 3–0	4–6–3
November 26	at #7 North Dakota*		Ralph Engelstad Arena • Grand Forks, ND	Abbey Miller	L 0–3	4–7–3
December 2	RIT		Tennity Ice Skating Pavilion • Syracuse, NY	Abbey Miller	T 2–2 ^{OT}	4–7–4 (3–2–2)
December 3	at RIT		Gene Polisseni Center • Rochester, NY	Maddi Welch	W 3–0	5–7–4 (4–2–2)
December 9	#4 Clarkson*		Tennity Ice Skating Pavilion • Syracuse, NY	Abbey Miller	T 2–2 ^{OT}	5–7–5
December 10	at #4 Clarkson*		Cheel Arena • Potsdam, NY	Abbey Miller	L 1–4	5–8–5
January 4, 2017	at #6 Boston College*		Kelley Rink • Chestnut Hill, MA	Abbey Miller	L 3–4	5–9–5
January 10	at #6 Cornell*		Lynah Rink • Ithaca, NY	Maddi Welch	L 2–7	5–10–5
January 13	Penn State		Tennity Ice Skating Pavilion • Syracuse, NY	Abbey Miller	W 3–1	6–10–5 (5–2–2)
January 14	Penn State		Tennity Ice Skating Pavilion • Syracuse, NY	Abbey Miller	W 4–1	7–10–5 (6–2–2)
January 20	at Lindenwood		Lindenwood Ice Arena • Wentzville, MO	Abbey Miller	W 5–0	8–10–5 (7–2–2)
January 21	at Lindenwood		Lindenwood Ice Arena • Wentzville, MO	Abbey Miller	W 3–0	9–10–5 (8–2–2)
January 27	#7 Robert Morris		Tennity Ice Skating Pavilion • Syracuse, NY	Abbey Miller	L 1–3	9–11–5 (8–3–2)
January 28	#7 Robert Morris		Tennity Ice Skating Pavilion • Syracuse, NY	Abbey Miller	W 5–1	10–11–5 (9–3–2)
February 10	Mercyhurst		Tennity Ice Skating Pavilion • Syracuse, NY	Abbey Miller	W 3–0	11–11–5 (10–3–2)
February 11	Mercyhurst		Tennity Ice Skating Pavilion • Syracuse, NY	Abbey Miller	L 2–3	11–12–5 (10–4–2)
February 17	at RIT		Gene Polisseni Center • Syracuse, NY	Abbey Miller	W 5–2	12–12–5 (11–4–2)
February 18	at RIT		Tennity Ice Skating Pavilion • Syracuse, NY	Abbey Miller	W 2–0	13–12–5 (12–4–2)
February 24	at Penn State		Pegula Ice Arena • University Park, PA	Abbey Miller	W 5–1	14–12–5 (13–4–2)
February 25	at Penn State		Pegula Ice Arena • University Park, PA	Abbey Miller	W 2–0	15–12–5 (14–4–2)
CHA Tournament
March 2	vs. RIT*		HarborCenter • Buffalo, NY (Semifinal Game)	Abbey Miller	W 4–0	16–12–5
March 3	vs. #9 Robert Morris*		HarborCenter • Buffalo, NY (CHA Championship Game)	Abbey Miller	L 0–2	16–13–5
*Non-conference game. ^{#}Rankings from USCHO.com Poll.

== Awards and honors ==
- Abbey Miller, CHA Goaltender of the Month, January, 2017
- Stephanie Grossi, CHA Player of the Month, January, 2017
- Abbey Miller, CHA Goaltender of the Month, February, 2017
- Allie Munroe, CHA Defenseman of the Year
- Abbey Miller, Goaltending Trophy (Best Goals Against Average)
- Allie Munroe, Defender, First Team All-Conference
- Stephanie Grossi, Forward, First Team All-Conference
- Abbey Miller, Goaltender, Second Team All-Conference
- Lindsay Eastwood, Defender, CHA All-Rookie Team
- Savannah Rennie, Forward, CHA All-Rookie Team
