= 2016–17 Penn State Nittany Lions women's ice hockey season =

- Conference: 4th College Hockey America
- Home ice: Pegula Ice Arena

Record
- Overall: 9-21-5
- Conference: 8-10-2
- Home: 2-9-3
- Road: 6-8-2

Coaches and captains
- Head coach: Josh Brandwene (5th season)
- Assistant coaches: Dean Jackson*; Lisa Marshall
- Captain: Laura Bowman
- Alternate captain(s): Kelsey Crow, Amy Peterson

Dean Jackson was the interim Head Coach as of January, 2017, following Josh Brandwene's leave of absence.

The Penn State Nittany Lions women represent Penn State University in CHA women's ice hockey during the 2016-17 NCAA Division I women's ice hockey season.

== Standings ==
2016–17 College Hockey America standings
	Conference							Overall					
	GP	W	L	T	PTS	GF	GA	GP	W	L	T	GF	GA
#8 Robert Morris†*	20	15	3	2	32	60	37	34	24	5	6	106	74
Syracuse	20	14	4	2	30	63	24	34	16	13	5	85	59
Mercyhurst	20	11	8	1	23	58	45	35	15	18	2	92	85
Penn State	20	8	10	2	18	47	54	35	9	21	5	74	104
RIT	20	4	14	2	10	31	59	36	7	27	2	49	116
Lindenwood	20	3	16	1	7	18	58	33	6	25	2	36	100
Championship: Robert Morris † indicates conference regular season champion * indicates conference tournament champion Current rankings: USCHO.com Division I women's poll

- Rankings based on number of wins in the conference

== Offseason ==
- April 22: 2016 Graduate Celine Whitlinger was tabbed for the 2015 USA Hockey Women’s Goaltender Development program.

== Roster ==
=== 2016–17 Nittany Lions ===
No.	Nat.	Player	Class	Pos	Height	DoB	Hometown	Previous team
1		Hannah Ehresmann	Junior	G	5' 8" (1.73 m)		Minnetonka, Minnesota	Minnetonka HS
3		Irene Kiroplis	Junior	F/D	5' 8" (1.73 m)		Georgetown, Ontario	Brampton Canadettes
5		Brooke Madsen	Freshman	D	5' 5" (1.65 m)		Eagan, Minnesota	Team USA U18
7		Kelsey Crow (A)	Sophomore	D	5' 5" (1.65 m)		Minnetonka, Minnesota	Minnetonka HS
8		Christi Vetter	Junior	F	5' 11" (1.8 m)		Lakeville, Minnesota	Lakeville North HS
9		Amy Petersen (A)	Senior	F	5' 4" (1.63 m)		Minnetonka, Minnesota	Minnetonka HS
10		Abby Welch	Freshman	F	5' 7" (1.7 m)		East Amherst, New York	Nichols School
11		Bella Sutton	Junior	D	5' 6" (1.68 m)		Shoreview, Minnesota	Mounds View HS
12		Sarah Nielsen	Senior	F	5' 6" (1.68 m)		Edina, Minnesota	[Edina HS
13		Hannah England	Sophomore	F	5' 6" (1.68 m)		Simi Valley, California	Shattuck-St. Mary's
15		Aly Hardy	Junior	F	5' 7" (1.7 m)		St. Albans, Vermont	Boston Shamrocks
16		Katie McMillan	Freshman	D	5' 4" (1.63 m)		Minnetonka, Minnesota	Minnetonka HS
18		Laura Bowman (C)	Junior	F	5' 7" (1.7 m)		Minnetonka, Minnesota	Minnetonka HS
22		Olivia Villani	Freshman	D	5' 10" (1.78 m)		Pittsburgh, Pennsylvania	East Coast Wizards
22		Kate Rydland	Freshman	F/D	5' 9" (1.75 m)		Eden Prairie, Minnesota	Eden Prairie HS
24		Victoria Samuelsson	Sophomore	F	5' 7" (1.7 m)		Leksand, Sweden	Bay State Breakers
25		Amanda McLeod	Freshman	F	5' 7" (1.7 m)		Calgary, Alberta	Edge School
26		Meike Meilleur	Sophomore	F	5' 10" (1.78 m)		Marquette, Manitoba	Team Manitoba
27		Kelly Seward	Senior	D	5' 9" (1.75 m)		Williamsville, New York	Nichols School
28		Caileah Forrest	Freshman	D	5' 11" (1.8 m)		Ottawa, Ontario	Nepean Jr. Wildcats (WCHA)
30		Celine Whitlinger	Senior	G	5' 8" (1.73 m)		Garden Grove, California	Gilmour Academy
34		Daniela Paniccia	Freshman	G	5' 5" (1.65 m)		Oakville, Ontario	Oakville Jr. Hornets

== Schedule ==
Date	Opponent^{#}	Rank^{#}	Site	Decision	Result	Record
Regular Season
September 30	at #5 Clarkson*		Cheel Arena • Potsdam, NY	Hannah Ehresmann	L 2–4	0–1–0
October 1	at #5 Clarkson*		Cheel Arena • Potsdam, NY	Hannah Ehresmann	L 1–2	0–2–0
October 7	at Union*		Achilles Center • Schenectady, NY	Daniela Paniccia	W 8–1	1–2–0
October 8	at Union*		Achilles Center • Schenectady, NY	Daniela Paniccia	L 2–4	1–3–0
October 14	Boston University*		Pegula Ice Arena • University Park, PA	Hannah Ehresmann	T 3–3 ^{OT}	1–3–1
October 15	Boston University*		Pegula Ice Arena • University Park, PA	Hannah Ehresmann	L 2–7	1–4–1
October 21	at Connecticut*		Freitas Ice Forum • Storrs, CT	Daniela Paniccia	T 0–0 ^{OT}	1–4–2
October 22	at Connecticut*		Freitas Ice Forum • Storrs, CT	Hannah Ehresmann	L 2–4	1–5–2
October 27	at RIT		Gene Polisseni Center • Rochester, NY	Daniela Paniccia	W 2–0	2–5–2 (1–0–0)
October 28	at RIT		Gene Polisseni Center • Rochester, NY	Daniela Paniccia	W 5–0	3–5–2 (2–0–0)
November 4	at Mercyhurst		Mercyhurst Ice Center • Erie, PA	Daniela Paniccia	L 4–6	3–6–2 (2–1–0)
November 5	at Mercyhurst		Mercyhurst Ice Center • Erie, PA	Daniela Paniccia	W 3–2 ^{OT}	4–6–2 (3–1–0)
November 11	Lindenwood		Pegula Ice Arena • University Park, PA	Daniela Paniccia	W 3–2	5–6–2 (4–1–0)
November 12	Lindenwood		Pegula Ice Arena • University Park, PA	Daniela Paniccia	T 1–1 ^{OT}	5–6–3 (4–1–1)
November 21	#3 St. Lawrence*		Pegula Ice Arena • University Park, PA	Hannah Ehresmann	L 0–3	5–7–3
November 22	#3 St. Lawrence*		Pegula Ice Arena • University Park, PA	Hannah Ehresmann	L 0–2	5–8–3
December 3	Robert Morris		Pegula Ice Arena • University Park, PA	Daniela Paniccia	L 2–4	5–9–3 (4–2–1)
December 4	Robert Morris		Pegula Ice Arena • University Park, PA	Daniela Paniccia	L 5–6	5–10–3 (4–3–1)
December 30	at #8 Quinnipiac*		TD Bank Sports Center • Hamden, CT	Daniela Paniccia	L 1–2	5–11–3
December 31	at Princeton*		Hobey Baker Memorial Rink • Princeton, NJ	Hannah Ehresmann	T 5–5 ^{OT}	5–11–4
January 6, 2017	Ohio State*		Pegula Ice Arena • University Park, PA	Daniela Paniccia	L 0–5	5–12–4
January 7	Ohio State*		Pegula Ice Arena • University Park, PA	Daniela Paniccia	L 0–6	5–13–4
January 13	at Syracuse		Tennity Ice Skating Pavilion • Syracuse, NY	Hannah Ehresmann	L 1–3	5–14–4 (4–4–1)
January 14	at Syracuse		Tennity Ice Skating Pavilion • Syracuse, NY	Daniela Paniccia	L 1–4	5–15–4 (4–5–1)
January 21	RIT		Pegula Ice Arena • University Park, PA	Hannah Ehresmann	W 3–0	6–15–4 (5–5–1)
January 22	RIT		Pegula Ice Arena • University Park, PA	Hannah Ehresmann	T 4–4 ^{OT}	6–15–5 (5–5–2)
January 27	Mercyhurst		Pegula Ice Arena • University Park, PA	Hannah Ehresmann	L 0–6	6–16–5 (5–6–2)
January 28	Mercyhurst		Pegula Ice Arena • University Park, PA	Hannah Ehresmann	L 3–4	6–17–5 (5–7–2)
February 10	at Lindenwood		Lindenwood Ice Arena • Wentzville, MO	Hannah Ehresmann	W 4–1	7–17–5 (6–7–2)
February 11	at Lindenwood		Lindenwood Ice Arena • Wentzville, MO	Hannah Ehresmann	W 2–0	8–17–5 (7–7–2)
February 17	at #8 Robert Morris		84 Lumber Arena • Neville Township, PA	Hannah Ehresmann	W 3–2	9–17–5 (8–7–2)
February 18	at #8 Robert Morris		84 Lumber Arena • Neville Township, PA	Hannah Ehresmann	L 0–2	9–18–5 (8–8–2)
February 24	Syracuse		Pegula Ice Arena • University Park, PA	Hannah Ehresmann	L 1–5	9–19–5 (8–9–2)
February 25	Syracuse		Pegula Ice Arena • University Park, PA	Hannah Ehresmann	L 0–2	9–20–5 (8–10–2)
CHA Tournament
March 2	vs. RIT*		HarborCenter • Buffalo, NY (Quarterfinal Game)	Hannah Ehresmann	L 1–2	9–21–5
*Non-conference game. ^{#}Rankings from USCHO.com Poll.
