= 2016–17 RIT Tigers women's ice hockey season =

- Conference: #5 CHA
- Home ice: Gene Polisseni Center, Rochester, NY

Record
- Overall: 7–27–2
- Conference: 4–14–2
- Home: 3–14–0
- Road: 3–12–2

Coaches and captains
- Head coach: Scott McDonald (11th season)
- Assistant coaches: Matt Woodard; Shane Madolora
- Captain: Taylor Thurston
- Alternate captain(s): Cassie Clayton; Mackezie Stone

The RIT Tigers represented the Rochester Institute of Technology in College Hockey America during the 2016-17 NCAA Division I women's ice hockey season.

== Standings ==
2016–17 College Hockey America standings
| | Conference | | | | | | | Overall | | | | | |
| | GP | W | L | T | PTS | GF | GA | GP | W | L | T | GF | GA |
|---|---|---|---|---|---|---|---|---|---|---|---|---|---|
| #8 Robert Morris†* | 20 | 15 | 3 | 2 | 32 | 60 | 37 | 34 | 24 | 5 | 6 | 106 | 74 |
| Syracuse | 20 | 14 | 4 | 2 | 30 | 63 | 24 | 34 | 16 | 13 | 5 | 85 | 59 |
| Mercyhurst | 20 | 11 | 8 | 1 | 23 | 58 | 45 | 35 | 15 | 18 | 2 | 92 | 85 |
| Penn State | 20 | 8 | 10 | 2 | 18 | 47 | 54 | 35 | 9 | 21 | 5 | 74 | 104 |
| RIT | 20 | 4 | 14 | 2 | 10 | 31 | 59 | 36 | 7 | 27 | 2 | 49 | 116 |
| Lindenwood | 20 | 3 | 16 | 1 | 7 | 18 | 58 | 33 | 6 | 25 | 2 | 36 | 100 |
Championship: Robert Morris † indicates conference regular season champion * indicates conference tournament champion Current rankings: USCHO.com Division I women's poll

- Rankings based on number of wins in the conference

== Offseason ==
- September 1: 2016 graduate Jetta Rackleff and 2014 graduate Erin Zach were each selected in the Canadian Women's Hockey League draft.

=== Recruiting ===
| Player | Position | Nationality | Notes |
| Taylor Baker | Defender | Canada | One of 3 recruits from the Toronto Aeros |
| Claudia Black | Forward | Canada | Key member of the Toronto Aeros |
| Madison Farrand | Goaltender | United States | Played with the Washington Pride |
| Tori Haywood | Forward | Canada | Member of the Toronto Aeros |
| Terra Lanteigne | Goaltender | Canada | Tended the net for Metro Boston Pizza (Nova Scotia) |
| Jade Mancini | Forward | Canada | Played for the Burlington Jr. Barracudas |

== Roster ==
=== 2016–17 Tigers ===
| No. | Nat. | Player | Class | Pos | Height | DoB | Hometown | Previous team |
|---|---|---|---|---|---|---|---|---|
| 2 | | Taylor Thurston (C) | Senior | D | 5' 6" (1.68 m) | | Kanata, Ontario | Nepean Wildcats |
| 4 | | Caitlin Wallace | Senior | F | 5' 9" (1.75 m) | | Brantford, Ontario | Stoney Creek Sabres |
| 7 | | Brooke Baker | Sophomore | F | 5' 8" (1.73 m) | | Saline, Michigan | Niagara Jr. Purple Eagles |
| 8 | | Madison Farrand | Freshman | F | 5' 4" (1.63 m) | | Potomac, Maryland | Washington Pride |
| 9 | | Lindsay Stenason | Senior | F/D | 5' 6" (1.68 m) | | Oakville, Ontario | Oakville Hornets |
| 10 | | Kendall Cornine | Sophomore | F | 5' 5" (1.65 m) | | Kinnelon, New Jersey | East Coast Wizards |
| 11 | | Christa Vuglar | Sophomore | D | 5' 3" (1.6 m) | | Crystal Lake, Illinois | Chicago Mission |
| 13 | | Darcy Henderson | Junior | F | 5' 7" (1.7 m) | | Burlington, Ontario | Burlington Barracudas |
| 14 | | Mackenzie Stone (A) | Senior | F | 5' 8" (1.73 m) | | Kars, Ontario | Nepean Wildcats |
| 15 | | Kandice Sheriff | Sophomore | F | 5' 9" (1.75 m) | | Brampton, Ontario | Leaside Wildcats |
| 16 | | Claudia Black | Freshman | F | 5' 5" (1.65 m) | | Newmarket, Ontario | Toronto Jr. Aeros |
| 17 | | Taylor Baker | Freshman | F | 5' 4" (1.63 m) | | Toronto, Ontario | Toronto Jr. Aeros |
| 18 | | Reagan Rust | Sophomore | F/D | 5' 7" (1.7 m) | | Southaven, Mississippi | Pittsburgh Penguins Elite |
| 19 | | Lauren Carroll | Junior | D | 5' 10" (1.78 m) | | Carlisle, Ontario | Oakville Hornets |
| 20 | | Mallory Rushton | Sophomore | F | 5' 2" (1.57 m) | | Amherst, Nova Scotia | New Hampton Prep |
| 23 | | Brinna Dochniak | Sophomore | F | 5' 5" (1.65 m) | | Marine on St. Croix, Minnesota | Stillwater Ponies |
| 24 | | Kathryn Kennedy | Sophomore | F | 5' 5" (1.65 m) | | Hamilton, Ontario | Hamilton Hawks |
| 25 | | Cassie Clayton (A) | Senior | F | 5' 6" (1.68 m) | | Pickering, Ontario | Mississauga Jr. Chiefs |
| 27 | | Tori Haywood | Freshman | F | 5' 3" (1.6 m) | | Pickering, Ontario | Toronto Jr. Aeros |
| 28 | | Jade Mancini | Freshman | F | 5' 8" (1.73 m) | | Burlington, Ontario | Burlington Jr. Barracudas |
| 31 | | Jenna de Jonge | Sophomore | G | 5' 10" (1.78 m) | | Abbotsford, British Columbia | Pursuit of Excellence |
| 34 | | Brooke Stoddart | Senior | G | 5' 6" (1.68 m) | | Elmvale, Ontario | Brampton Thunder |
| 35 | | Terra Lanteigne | Freshman | G | 5' 8" (1.73 m) | | Hatchet Lake, Nova Scotia | Metro Boston Pizza |

== Schedule ==
| Date | Opponent^{#} | Rank^{#} | Site | Decision | Result | Record |
Regular Season
| September 30 | at Minnesota State* | | Verizon Wireless Center • Mankato, MN | Terra Lanteigne | L 1–2 ^{OT} | 0–1–0 |
| October 1 | at Minnesota State* | | Verizon Wireless Center • Mankato, MN | Terra Lanteigne | L 1–2 | 0–2–0 |
| October 7 | Providence* | | Gene Polisseni Center • Rochester, NY | Brooke Stoddart | L 0–7 | 0–3–0 |
| October 8 | Providence* | | Gene Polisseni Center • Rochester, NY | Jenna de Jonge | L 0–3 | 0–4–0 |
| October 14 | Union* | | Gene Polisseni Center • Rochester, NY | Terra Lanteigne | L 0–2 | 0–5–0 |
| October 15 | Union* | | Gene Polisseni Center • Rochester, NY | Terra Lanteigne | W 2–0 | 1–5–0 |
| October 21 | at Yale* | | Ingalls Rink • New Haven, CT | Terra Lanteigne | L 1–4 | 1–6–0 |
| October 22 | at Yale* | | Ingalls Rink • New Haven, CT | Terra Lanteigne | L 2–8 | 1–7–0 |
| October 27 | Penn State | | Gene Polisseni Center • Rochester, NY | Terra Lanteigne | L 0–2 | 1–8–0 (0–1–0) |
| October 28 | Penn State | | Gene Polisseni Center • Rochester, NY | Terra Lanteigne | L 0–5 | 1–9–0 (0–2–0) |
| November 4 | #6 Colgate* | | Gene Polisseni Center • Rochester, NY | Terra Lanteigne | L 2–6 | 1–10–0 |
| November 5 | at #6 Colgate* | | Starr Rink • Hamilton, NY | Jenna de Jonge | L 1–4 | 1–11–0 |
| November 11 | Robert Morris | | Gene Polisseni Center • Rochester, NY | Jenna de Jonge | L 3–4 | 1–12–0 (0–3–0) |
| November 12 | Robert Morris | | Gene Polisseni Center • Rochester, NY | Brooke Stoddart | L 1–5 | 1–13–0 (0–4–0) |
| November 18 | at Lindenwood | | Lindenwood Ice Arena • Wentzville, MO | Terra Lanteigne | L 0–2 | 1–14–0 (0–5–0) |
| November 19 | at Lindenwood | | Lindenwood Ice Arena • Wentzville, MO | Terra Lanteigne | W 2–1 | 2–14–0 (1–5–0) |
| November 25 | at Rensselaer* | | Houston Field House • Troy, NY | Terra Lanteigne | L 1–5 | 2–15–0 |
| November 26 | at Rensselaer* | | Houston Field House • Troy, NY | Jenna de Jonge | W 3–1 | 3–15–0 |
| December 2 | at Syracuse | | Tennity Ice Skating Pavilion • Syracuse, NY | Jenna de Jonge | T 2–2 ^{OT} | 3–15–1 (1–5–1) |
| December 3 | Syracuse | | Gene Polisseni Center • Rochester, NY | Jenna de Jonge | L 0–3 | 3–16–1 (1–6–1) |
| December 9 | Bemidji State* | | Gene Polisseni Center • Rochester, NY | Jenna de Jonge | L 1–3 | 3–17–1 |
| December 10 | Bemidji State* | | Gene Polisseni Center • Rochester, NY | Jenna de Jonge | L 1–5 | 3–18–1 |
| January 13, 2017 | at Mercyhurst | | Mercyhurst Ice Center • Erie, PA | Terra Lanteigne | L 2–5 | 3–19–1 (1–7–1) |
| January 14 | at Mercyhurst | | Mercyhurst Ice Center • Erie, PA | Terra Lanteigne | W 4–0 | 4–19–1 (2–7–1) |
| January 21 | at Penn State | | Pegula Ice Arena • University Park, PA | Terra Lanteigne | L 0–3 | 4–20–1 (2–8–1) |
| January 22 | at Penn State | | Pegula Ice Arena • University Park, PA | Terra Lanteigne | T 4–4 ^{OT} | 4–20–2 (2–8–2) |
| January 27 | Lindenwood | | Gene Polisseni Center • Rochester, NY | Jenna de Jonge | W 5–0 | 5–20–2 (3–8–2) |
| January 28 | Lindenwood | | Gene Polisseni Center • Rochester, NY | Jenna de Jonge | W 1–0 | 6–20–2 (4–8–2) |
| February 10 | at #8 Robert Morris | | 84 Lumber Arena • Neville Township, PA | Jenna de Jonge | L 1–4 | 6–21–2 (4–9–2) |
| February 11 | at #8 Robert Morris | | 84 Lumber Arena • Neville Township, PA | Jenna de Jonge | L 2–5 | 6–22–2 (4–10–2) |
| February 17 | Syracuse | | Gene Polisseni Center • Rochester, NY | Brooke Stoddart | L 2–5 | 6–23–2 (4–11–2) |
| February 18 | at Syracuse | | Tennity Ice Slating Pavilion • Syracuse, NY | Terra Lanteigne | L 0–2 | 6–24–2 (4–12–2) |
| February 24 | Mercyhurst | | Gene Polisseni Center • Rochester, NY | Terra Lanteigne | L 2–3 | 6–25–2 (4–13–2) |
| February 24 | Mercyhurst | | Gene Polisseni Center • Rochester, NY | Brooke Stoddart | L 0–4 | 6–26–2 (4–14–2) |
CHA Tournament
| March 2 | vs. Penn State* | | HarborCenter • Buffalo, NY (Quarterfinal Game) | Jenna de Jonge | W 2–1 | 7–26–2 |
| March 3 | vs. Syracuse* | | HarborCenter • Buffalo, NY (Semifinal Game) | Jenna de Jonge | L 0–4 | 7–27–2 |
*Non-conference game. ^{#}Rankings from USCHO.com Poll.

== Awards and honors ==
- Mackenzie Stone
  CHA Best Defensive Forward
- Caitlin Wallace
  CHA Individual Sportsmanship Award
- Terra Lanteigne, Goaltender
  CHA All-Rookie Team
