= 2016–17 Colgate Raiders women's ice hockey season =

- Conference: 6th ECAC
- Home ice: Class of 1965 Arena

Record
- Overall: 22–11–3
- Home: 11–4–2
- Road: 11–7–1

Coaches and captains
- Head coach: Greg Fargo
- Assistant coaches: Sophie LeClerc; Stefan DeCosse
- Captain(s): Cat Quirion; Cat Quirion; Annika Zalewski

The Colgate Raiders represented Colgate University in ECAC women's ice hockey during the 2016–17 NCAA Division I women's ice hockey season.

== Offseason ==
- July 14: The Class of 1965 Arena was completed, replacing the Starr Rink/Arena.
- August 15: Shae Labbe was named to Team Canada's Development Team.

=== Recruiting ===
Player	Position	Nationality	Notes
Livi Altman	Defense	Switzerland	Bronze Medalist at 2014 Olympice with Swiss National Team
Liz Auby	Goaltender	United States	Tended net with Madison Capitols
Bailey Bennett	Forward	United States	Attended North American Hockey Academy
Anonda Hoppner	Forward	Canada	Member of Team Canada U18

== Roster ==
=== 2016-17 Raiders ===
No.	Nat.	Player	Class	Pos	Height	DoB	Hometown	Previous team
3		Olivia Zafuto	Sophomore	D	5' 6" (1.68 m)		Niagara Falls, New York	Niagara Jr. Purple Eagles
4		Kaila Pinkney	Junior	D	5' 9" (1.75 m)		Denfield, Ontario	Team Canada U18
6		Shelby Perry	Junior	F	5' 8" (1.73 m)		Elginburg, Ontario	Kingston Ice Wolves
7		Megan Sullivan	Junior	F	5' 4" (1.63 m)		Toronto, Ontario	Whitby Jr. Wolves
9		Jessie Eldridge	Sophomore	F	5' 9" (1.75 m)		Barrie, Ontario	Toronto Jr. Aeros
10		Ellie DeCaprio	Junior	F	5' 4" (1.63 m)		Wellesley, Massachusetts	Rivers School
11		Breanne Wilson-Bennett	Junior	F	5' 4" (1.63 m)		Markham, Ontario	Team Canada U18
12		Shae Labbe	Sophomore	F	5' 6" (1.68 m)		Calgary, Alberta	Team Canada U18
15		Annika Zalewski (C)	Junior	F	5' 10" (1.78 m)		New Hartford, New York	Buffalo Bisons
19		Shannon Ormel	Sophomore	F	5' 7" (1.7 m)		Winnipeg, Manitoba	Team Manitoba
20		Anonda Hoppner	Freshman	F	5' 11" (1.8 m)		Carp, Ontario	Team Canada U18
21		Lauren Wildfang	Junior	D	5' 4" (1.63 m)		Waterdown, Ontario	Team Canada U18
22		Chelsea Jacques	Sophomore	D	5' 5" (1.65 m)		Calumet, Michigan	Madison Capitols
25		Hannah Rastrick	Senior	D	5' 8" (1.73 m)		Toronto, Ontario	Toronto Jr. Aeros
26		Cat Querion (C)	Senior	D	5' 1" (1.55 m)		Lac-Megantic, Quebec	Stanstead College
27		Meghan Brennan	Senior	F	5' 9" (1.75 m)		Ottawa, Ontario	Nepean Jr. Wildcats
28		Livia Altmann	Freshman	F	5' 4" (1.63 m)		Arosa, Switzerland	Swiss National Team
29		Megan DuBois	Sophomore	G	5' 5" (1.65 m)		Hudson, Wisconsin	Shattuck-St. Mary's
31		Liz Auby	Freshman	G	5' 6" (1.68 m)		Stoughton, Wisconsin	Madison Capitols
33		Julia Vandyk	Sophomore	G	5' 8" (1.73 m)		Cambridge, Ontario	Cambridge Jr. Rivulettes
61		Bailey Larson	Sophomore	F	5' 2" (1.57 m)		Sycamore, Illinois	Team USA U18

== Schedule ==
Date	Opponent^{#}	Rank^{#}	Site	Decision	Result	Record
Regular Season
October 1	New Hampshire*	#8	Class of 1965 Arena • Hamilton, NY	Julia Vandyk	W 4–2	1–0–0
October 2	New Hampshire*	#8	Class of 1965 Arena • Hamilton, NY	Julia Vandyk	W 3–1	2–0–0
October 7	Merrimack*	#8	Class of 1965 Arena • Hamilton, NY	Liz Auby	W 4–3	3–0–0
October 8	Merrimack*	#8	Class of 1965 Arena • Hamilton, NY	Julia Vandyk	W 6–0	4–0–0
October 21	at Syracuse*	#5	Tennity Ice Skating Pavilion • Syracuse, NY	Julia Vandyk	W 3–2	5–0–0
October 22	Syracuse*	#5	Class of 1965 Arena • Hamilton, NY	Julia Vandyk	T 2–2 ^{OT}	5–0–1
October 28	at Union	#6	Achilles Center • Schenectady, NY	Julia Vandyk	W 2–0	6–0–1 (1–0–0)
October 29	at Rensselaer	#6	Houston Field House • Troy, NY	Julia Vandyk	W 4–1	7–0–1 (2–0–0)
November 1	Cornell	#6	Class of 1965 Arena • Hamilton, NY	Julia Vandyk	W 2–1	8–0–1 (3–0–0)
November 4	at RIT*	#6	Gene Polisseni Center • Rochester, NY	Liz Auby	W 6–2	9–0–1
November 5	RIT*	#6	Class of 1965 Arena • Hamilton, NY	Julia Vandyk	W 4–1	10–0–1
November 11	Yale	#5	Class of 1965 Arena • Hamilton, NY	Julia Vandyk	W 4–3	11–0–1 (4–0–0)
November 12	Brown	#5	Class of 1965 Arena • Hamilton, NY	Julia Vandyk	W 3–0	12–0–1 (5–0–0)
November 18	at Princeton	#5	Hobey Baker Memorial Rink • Princeton, NJ	Julia Vandyk	L 2–7	12–1–1 (5–1–0)
November 19	at #8 Quinnipiac	#5	High Point Solutions Arena • Hamden, CT	Julia Vandyk	L 1–3	12–2–1 (5–2–0)
November 22	at Mercyhurst*	#9	Mercyhurst Ice Center • Erie, PA	Julia Vandyk	W 4–2	13–2–1
November 23	at Mercyhurst*	#9	Mercyhurst Ice Center • Erie, PA	Julia Vandyk	W 5–1	14–2–1
December 2	Dartmouth	#7	Class of 1965 Arena • Hamilton, NY	Julia Vandyk	W 2–1	15–2–1 (6–2–0)
December 3	Harvard	#7	Class of 1965 Arena • Hamilton, NY	Julia Vandyk	T 3–3 ^{OT}	15–2–2 (6–2–1)
January 6, 2017	at St. Cloud State*	#7	Herb Brooks National Hockey Center • St. Cloud, MN	Julia Vandyk	L 4–7	15–3–2
January 7	at St. Cloud State*	#7	Herb Brooks National Hockey Center • St. Cloud, MN	Liz Auby	T 0–0 ^{OT}	15–3–3
January 13	#9 Quinnipiac	#8	Class of 1965 Arena • Hamilton, NY	Julia Vandyk	L 0–2	15–4–3 (6–3–1)
January 14	Princeton	#8	Class of 1965 Arena • Hamilton, NY	Julia Vandyk	L 1–5	15–5–3 (6–4–1)
January 17	at #10 Cornell		Lynah Rink • Ithaca, NY	Julia Vandyk	L 1–2	15–6–3 (6–5–1)
January 20	at #5 St. Lawrence		Appleton Arena • Canton, NY	Julia Vandyk	W 4–3 ^{OT}	16–6–3 (7–5–1)
January 21	at #3 Clarkson		Cheel Arena • Potsdam, NY	Julia Vandyk	L 1–2	16–7–3 (7–6–1)
January 27	at Harvard		Bright-Landry Hockey Center • Allston, MA	Julia Vandyk	W 4–0	17–7–3 (8–6–1)
January 28	at Dartmouth		Thompson Arena • Hanover, NH	Julia Vandyk	W 6–1	18–7–3 (9–6–1)
February 3	Rensselaer		Class of 1965 Arena • Hamilton, NY	Julia Vandyk	W 3–0	19–7–3 (10–6–1)
February 4	Union		Class of 1965 Arena • Hamilton, NY	Julia Vandyk	W 4–1	20–7–3 (11–6–1)
February 10	at Brown		Meehan Auditorium • Providence, RI	Julia Vandyk	W 7–3	21–7–3 (12–6–1)
February 11	at Yale		Ingalls Rink • New Haven, CT	Julia Vandyk	W 3–1	22–7–3 (13–6–1)
February 17	#3 Clarkson		Class of 1965 Arena • Hamilton, NY	Julia Vandyk	L 2–5	22–8–3 (13–7–1)
February 18	#5 St. Lawrence		Class of 1965 Arena • Hamilton, NY	Julia Vandyk	L 0–3	22–9–3 (13–8–1)
ECAC Tournament
February 24	at #7 Cornell*		Lynah Rink • Ithaca, NY (Quarterfinals, Game 1)	Julia Vandyk	L 1–2	22–10–3
February 25	at #7 Cornell*		Lynah Rink • Ithaca, NY (Quarterfinals, Game 2)	Julia Vandyk	L 0–1	22–11–3
*Non-conference game. ^{#}Rankings from USCHO.com Poll.

== Awards and honors ==
- Jessie Eldridge, Forward, ECAC Third Team All-Star
