= 2016–17 Clarkson Golden Knights women's ice hockey season =

NCAA National Collegiate Champions ECAC Hockey Regular Season Champions ECAC Hockey Tournament Champions Windjammer Classic Champions NCAA Championship Game, W 3–0 vs. Wisconsin
- Conference: 1st ECAC
- Home ice: Cheel Arena

Rankings
- USCHO.com: #1
- USA Today/USA Hockey Magazine: #1

Record
- Overall: 32–4–5
- Home: 17–3–2
- Road: 13–1–2
- Neutral: 2–0–1

Coaches and captains
- Head coach: Matt Desrosiers
- Assistant coaches: Britni Smith; Tony Maci
- Captain(s): Savannah Harmon; Cayley Mercer
- Alternate captain(s): Genevieve Bannon; Lauren Lefler

The Clarkson Golden Knights women's ice hockey program represented Clarkson University during the 2016–17 NCAA Division I women's ice hockey season. The Golden Knights entered the season following their second Frozen Four appearance the previous season.

After a slow start, the Golden Knights rebounded to win their third ECAC Regular Season title in four years. They followed this with their first ever ECAC tournament championship, defeating Cornell by a score of 1–0. In the NCAA Tournament, the Golden Knights advanced to their second title game, which they won 3–0 over top-ranked Wisconsin for the program's second national title. In addition to the postseason championships, the Golden Knights also won an in-season tournament for the first time, winning the Windjammer Classic at Vermont on Thanksgiving weekend.

== Offseason ==
=== Coaching changes ===
The offseason saw the departure of two-year assistant coach Meghan Duggan, who left to concentrate on preparing for the Winter Olympics in two years time. Her role was filled by Tony Maci, who had previously served as an assistant coach at Adrian College and Princeton.

=== Recruiting ===
Player	Position	Nationality	Notes
Jenna Brenneman	Goaltender	United States	Played for Breck School
Katherine Beaumier	Forward	United States	Played for Anaheim Lady Ducks
Michaela Pejzlova	Forward	Czech Republic	Played for Stanstead College; Member of Czech Republic team at the 2016 IIHF Women's World Championship
Ella Shelton	Defense	Canada	Played for London Jr. Devilettes; Member of 2016 U18 Team Ontario
Taylor Turnquist	Defense	United States	Played for Spring Lake Park High School

== Roster ==
No.	Nat.	Player	Class	Pos	Height	DoB	Hometown	Previous team
2		Corie Jacobson	Senior	F	5' 6" (1.68 m)	1995-05-28	Warren, Ontario	Northbay Ice Boltz
7		Jessica Gillham	Senior	F	5' 7" (1.7 m)	1995-03-15	Uxbridge, Ontario	Aurora Panthers
8		Lauren Lefler (A)	Junior	F	5' 8" (1.73 m)	1996-06-26	Windsor, Ontario	Bluewater Jr. Hawks
9		Genevieve Bannon (A)	Senior	F	5' 8" (1.73 m)	1995-02-03	Candiac, Quebec	Ontario Hockey Academy
10		Michaela Pejzlova	Freshman	F	5' 7" (1.7 m)	1997-04-06	Pardubice, Czech Republic	Stanstead Spartans
11		Ella Shelton	Freshman	D	5' 8" (1.73 m)	1998-01-19	Ingersoll, Ontario	London Devilettes
12		Katherine Beaumier	Freshman	F	5' 4" (1.63 m)	1998-02-03	Richland, Washington	Anaheim Lady Ducks
14		Savannah Harmon (C)	Junior	D	5' 3" (1.6 m)	1995-10-27	Downers Grove, Illinois	Boston Shamrocks
15		Amanda Titus	Junior	F	5' 6" (1.68 m)	1996-10-06	Stittsville, Ontario	Ottawa Jr. Senators
17		Taylor Turnquist	Freshman	D	5' 5" (1.65 m)	1997-08-14	Blaine, Minnesota	Spring Lake Park H.S.
18		Cayley Mercer (C)	Senior (RS)	F	5' 8" (1.73 m)	1994-01-18	Exeter, Ontario	Bluewater Jr. Hawks
19		Loren Gabel	Sophomore	F	5' 4" (1.63 m)	1997-07-24	Kitchener, Ontario	Oakville Jr. Hornets
21		Emma Keenan	Sophomore	D	5' 7" (1.7 m)	1997-11-26	Calgary, Alberta	Okanagan Hockey Academy
22		Cassidy Vinkle	Sophomore	F	5' 8" (1.73 m)	1997-08-28	Belleville, Ontario	Whitby Jr. Wolves
24		Katelyn Fournier	Junior	F	5' 7" (1.7 m)	1996-03-25	Ottawa, Ontario	Ottawa Jr. Senators
25		Rhyen McGill	Sophomore	F	5' 8" (1.73 m)	1997-10-28	Whitby, Ontario	Whitby Jr. Wolves
26		Kelly Mariani	Sophomore	F	5' 3" (1.6 m)	1997-03-03	Mississauga, Ontario	Mississauga Jr. Chiefs
27		Brielle Bellerive	Junior	F	5' 9" (1.75 m)	1996-12-01	North Vancouver, British Columbia	Okanagan Hockey Academy
28		Josiane Pozzebon	Sophomore	D	5' 5" (1.65 m)	1997-03-25	Bourget, Ontario	Nepean Jr. Wildcats
31		Jenna Brenneman	Freshman	G	5' 8" (1.73 m)	1998-07-13	Eagan, Minnesota	Breck H.S.
33		Mckenzie Johnson	Senior	G	5' 7" (1.7 m)	1995-06-01	Eden Prairie, Minnesota	Eden Prairie H.S.
35		Shea Tiley	Junior	G	5' 10" (1.78 m)	1996-12-02	Owen Sound, Ontario	Kitchener-Waterloo Rangers

== Schedule ==
Date	Opponent^{#}	Rank^{#}	Site	Decision	Result	Record
Regular Season
September 23	Concordia*	#5	Cheel Arena • Potsdam, NY (exhibition)	McKenzie Johnson	L 2–3	0–0–0
September 30	Penn State*	#5	Cheel Arena • Potsdam, NY	Shea Tiley	W 4–2	1–0–0
October 1	Penn State*	#5	Cheel Arena • Potsdam, NY	Shea Tiley	W 2–1	2–0–0
October 7	at St. Lawrence*	#4	Appleton Arena • Canton, NY	Shea Tiley	L 1–2	2–1–0
October 8	St. Lawrence*	#4	Cheel Arena • Potsdam, NY	Shea Tiley	T 3–3 ^{OT}	2–1–1
October 14	#1 Wisconsin*	#7	Cheel Arena • Potsdam, NY	Shea Tiley	L 2–3 ^{OT}	2–2–1
October 15	#1 Wisconsin*	#7	Cheel Arena • Potsdam, NY	Shea Tiley	L 1–4	2–3–1
October 22	at New Hampshire*	#8	Whittemore Center • Durham, NH	Shea Tiley	W 3–1	3–3–1
October 23	at New Hampshire*	#8	Whittemore Center • Durham, NH	Shea Tiley	W 3–1	4–3–1
October 28	Harvard	#8	Cheel Arena • Potsdam, NY	Shea Tiley	W 4–0	5–3–1 (1–0–0)
October 29	Dartmouth	#8	Cheel Arena • Potsdam, NY	Shea Tiley	W 6–1	6–3–1 (2–0–0)
November 4	at #5 Quinnipiac	#8	TD Bank Sports Center • Hamden, CT	Shea Tiley	W 4–1	7–3–1 (3–0–0)
November 5	at #10 Princeton	#8	Hobey Baker Memorial Rink • Princeton, NJ	Shea Tiley	W 4–2	8–3–1 (4–0–0)
November 11	Union	#7	Cheel Arena • Potsdam, NY	McKenzie Johnson	W 5–1	9–3–1 (5–0–0)
November 12	RPI	#7	Cheel Arena • Potsdam, NY	Shea Tiley	W 8–3	10–3–1 (6–0–0)
November 18	at Brown	#7	Meehan Auditorium • Providence, RI	Shea Tiley	W 8–1	11–3–1 (7–0–0)
November 19	at Yale	#7	Ingalls Rink • New Haven, CT	Shea Tiley	W 4–1	12–3–1 (8–0–0)
November 25	vs. Robert Morris*	#5	Gutterson Fieldhouse • Burlington, VT (Windjammer Classic Semifinals)	Shea Tiley	T 3–3 ^{SO, 2–1}	12–3–2
November 26	at Vermont*	#5	Gutterson Fieldhouse • Burlington, VT (Windjammer Classic Championship)	Shea Tiley	W 3–1	13–3–2
December 1	#3 St. Lawrence	#5	Cheel Arena • Potsdam, NY	Shea Tiley	T 3–3 ^{OT}	13–3–3 (8–0–1)
December 3	at #3 St. Lawrence	#5	Appleton Arena • Canton, NY	Shea Tiley	W 4–1	14–3–3 (9–0–1)
December 9	at Syracuse*	#4	Tennity Ice Skating Pavilion • Syracuse, NY	Shea Tiley	T 2–2 ^{OT}	14–3–4
December 10	Syracuse*	#4	Cheel Arena • Potsdam, NY	McKenzie Johnson	W 4–1	15–3–4
January 13	Yale	#3	Cheel Arena • Potsdam, NY	Shea Tiley	W 4–2	16–3–4 (10–0–1)
January 14	Brown	#3	Cheel Arena • Potsdam, NY	McKenzie Johnson	W 8–1	17–3–4 (11–0–1)
January 20	#10 Cornell	#3	Cheel Arena • Potsdam, NY	Shea Tiley	L 1–2	17–4–4 (11–1–1)
January 21	Colgate	#3	Cheel Arena • Potsdam, NY	Shea Tiley	W 2–1	18–4–4 (12–1–1)
January 27	at RPI	#3	Houston Field House • Troy, NY	Shea Tiley	W 4–2	19–4–4 (13–1–1)
January 28	at Union	#3	Achilles Rink • Schenectady, NY	McKenzie Johnson	W 3–1	20–4–4 (14–1–1)
February 3	at Dartmouth	#3	Thompson Arena • Hanover, NH	Shea Tiley	W 3–0	21–4–4 (15–1–1)
February 4	at Harvard	#3	Bright-Landry Hockey Center • Allston, MA	Shea Tiley	T 2–2 ^{OT}	21–4–5 (15–1–2)
February 11	#10 Princeton	#4	Cheel Arena • Potsdam, NY	Shea Tiley	W 3–1	22–4–5 (16–1–2)
February 12	#9 Quinnipiac	#4	Cheel Arena • Potsdam, NY	Shea Tiley	W 1–0	23–4–5 (17–1–2)
February 17	at Colgate	#3	Class of 1965 Arena • Hamilton, NY	Shea Tiley	W 5–2	24–4–5 (18–1–2)
February 18	at #7 Cornell	#3	Lynah Rink • Ithaca, NY	Shea Tiley	W 5–4 ^{OT}	25–4–5 (19–1–2)
ECAC Hockey Tournament
February 24	RPI*	#3	Cheel Arena • Potsdam, NY (Quarterfinals Game 1)	Shea Tiley	W 4–1	26–4–5
February 25	RPI*	#3	Cheel Arena • Potsdam, NY (Quarterfinals Game 2)	Shea Tiley	W 5–2	27–4–5
March 4	#8 Princeton*	#3	Cheel Arena • Potsdam, NY (Semifinals)	Shea Tiley	W 4–0	28–4–5
March 5	#7 Cornell*	#3	Cheel Arena • Potsdam, NY (Championship)	Shea Tiley	W 1–0	29–4–5
NCAA Tournament
March 11	#7 Cornell*	#2	Cheel Arena • Potsdam, NY (Quarterfinals)	Shea Tiley	W 3–1	30–4–5
March 17	vs. #5 Minnesota*	#2	Family Arena • St. Charles, MO (Semifinals)	Shea Tiley	W 4–3	31–4–5
March 19	vs. #1 Wisconsin*	#2	Family Arena • St. Charles, MO (Championship)	Shea Tiley	W 3–0	32–4–5
*Non-conference game. ^{#}Rankings from USCHO.com Poll.

== Awards and honors ==
- Genevieve Bannon – NCAA All-Tournament Team, Second Team All-USCHO.com, ECAC Hockey Second Team All-Star, ECAC Hockey weekly Honor Roll (11/1, 11/22, 1/24, 2/6)
- Loren Gabel – ECAC Hockey All-Tournament Team, ECAC Hockey Player of the Week (3/5), ECAC Hockey weekly Honor Roll (11/7, 2/14)
- Savannah Harmon – NCAA All-Tournament Team, Second Team AHCA All-American, Second Team All-USCHO.com, Patty Kazmaier Memorial Award nominee, ECAC Hockey First Team All-Star, ECAC Hockey Player of the Year finalist, ECAC Hockey Best Defenseman, ECAC Hockey weekly Honor Roll (10/25)
- Corie Jacobson – ECAC Hockey weekly Honor Roll (10/11)
- McKenzie Johnson – ECAC Hockey Goaltender of the Week (12/13), ECAC Hockey weekly Honor Roll (11/15, 1/17)
- Ryhen McGill – ECAC Hockey All-Tournament Team, ECAC Hockey weekly Honor Roll (11/15)
- Cayley Mercer – Patty Kazmaier Memorial Award finalist, USCHO.com Player of the Year, NCAA Tournament Most Outstanding Player, NCAA All-Tournament Team, First Team AHCA All-American, First Team All-USCHO.com, ECAC Hockey Player of the Year, ECAC Hockey All-Tournament Team, ECAC Hockey First Team All-Star, ECAC Hockey Best Forward, ECAC Hockey Player of the Month (February, March), ECAC Hockey Player of the Week (12/5, 1/31, 2/21), ECAC Hockey weekly Honor Roll (12/13, 1/24)
- Michaela Pejzlova – ECAC Hockey All-Rookie Team, ECAC Hockey Rookie of the Week (11/7, 11/15), ECAC Hockey weekly Honor Roll (10/25, 11/1, 11/22, 1/17, 2/21), Windjammer Classic All-Tournament Team
- Ella Shelton – USCHO.com All-Rookie Team, ECAC Hockey All-Tournament Team, ECAC Hockey Third Team All-Star, ECAC Hockey All-Rookie Team, ECAC Hockey All-Rookie Team, ECAC Hockey Rookie of the Month (December, March), ECAC Hockey Rookie of the Week (3/5), ECAC Hockey weekly Honor Roll (12/6, 12/13, 1/31, 2/6, 2/14)
- Shea Tiley – Second Team All-USCHO.com, ECAC Hockey Tournament Most Outstanding Player, ECAC Hockey Third Team All-Star, ECAC Hockey Goaltender of the Year finalist, ECAC Hockey Goaltender of the Month (February, March), ECAC Hockey Goaltender of the Week (2/14, 3/5), ECAC Hockey weekly Honor Roll (10/25, 11/1, 11/22, 11/29, 12/6, 1/31, 2/6, 2/21)
- Taylor Turnquist – ECAC Hockey weekly Honor Roll (11/29)
- Cassidy Vinkle – ECAC Hockey weekly Honor Roll (11/29, 1/17), Windjammer Classic Most Valuable Player, Windjammer Classic All-Tournament Team
