= 2016–17 Lindenwood Lady Lions ice hockey season =

2016–17 Lindenwood Lady Lions women's ice hockey season
- Conference: 6th College Hockey America
- Home ice: Lindenwood Ice Arena

Record
- Overall: 6–25–2
- Home: 3–12–0
- Road: 2–12–2
- Neutral: 1–1–0

Coaches and captains
- Head coach: Scott Spencer
- Assistant coaches: Cory Whitaker; Melanie Jue; Nicole Hensley
- Captain: Tae Otte
- Alternate captain(s): Britannia Gillanders; Shannon Morris-Reade; Katie Nokelby.

The Lindenwood Lady Lions women represented Lindenwood University in CHA women's ice hockey during the 2016-17 NCAA Division I women's ice hockey season.

== Offseason ==
- April 5: Nicole Hensley, Class of 2016, was a key member of the gold medal Team USA 2016 IIHF. During the tournament, Hensley posted a shutout against Russia. During the 2016–17 season, Hensley returned to Lindenwood in the capacity of Assistant Coach. She is the NCAA all-time saves leader, with 4,094 saves in net for the Lady Lions.

=== Recruiting ===
Player	Position	Nationality	Notes
Courtney Ganske	Defender	Canada	Attended Killarney Collegiate School
Taylor Girard	Forward	United States	Competed with Detroit Honeybaked
Emma Hare	Forward	Canada	From Pursuit of Excellence Academy
Lillian Marchant	Forward	United States	Played for Anaheim Lady Ducks
Kirsten Martin	Forward	Canada	Played for Pacific Steelers
Erin Near	Defender	Canada	Competed with Toronto Jr. Aeros
Morgan Skinner	Goaltender	Canada	Teammate of Kirsten Martin with Pacific Steelers

== Roster ==
=== 2016–17 Lady Lions ===
No.	Nat.	Player	Class	Pos	Height	DoB	Hometown	Previous team
2		Kirsten Martin	Freshman	F	5' 8" (1.73 m)		Rosedale, British Columbia	Pacific Steelers
4		Carrie Atkinson	Senior	D	5' 9" (1.75 m)		Fort Worth, Texas	Dallas Stars Elite
7		Sarah Bobrowski	Junior	F	5' 3" (1.6 m)		Woodbury, Minnesota	Hill-Murray HS
8		Tirra Lemoine	Sophomore	F	5' 7" (1.7 m)		St. Lazare, Manitoba	Pursuit of Excellence
9		Jordyn Pimm	Freshman	F	5' 8" (1.73 m)		Ottawa, Ontario	Ottawa Lady Senators
11		Erin Near	Freshman	F	5' 6" (1.68 m)		New Hamburg, Ontario	Toronto Jr. Aeros
12		Ally Larson	Sophomore	F	5' 6" (1.68 m)		West Vancouver, British Columbia	TPursuit of Excellence
13		Tae Otte (C)	Senior (RS)	D	5' 8" (1.73 m)		Grand Rapids, Michigan	Little Caesar's
15		Emma Hare	Freshman	F	5' 6" (1.68 m)		Penticton, British Columbia	Pursuit of Excellence
16		Cierra Paisley	Freshman	F	5' 6" (1.68 m)		Shawnigan Lake, British Columbia	Vancouver Comets
17		Taylor Girard	Freshman	F	5' 10" (1.78 m)		Macomb, Michigan	Detroit Honeybaked
18		Lillian Marchant	Freshman	F	5' 6" (1.68 m)		Tustin, California	Anaheim Lady Ducks
19		Kaitlyn Davidson	Junior	F	5' 9" (1.75 m)		Mars, Pennsylvania	Team Pittsburgh
20		Holly Dietzler	Senior	F	5' 5" (1.65 m)		Bloomington, Minnesota	Jefferson HS
21		Corbin Welsh	Sophomore	F	5' 5" (1.65 m)		Grand Prairie, Alberta	Pursuit of Excellence
22		Courtney Ganske	Freshman	F	5' 6" (1.68 m)		Killarney, Manitoba	Westman Wildcats
23		Shannon Morris-Reade (A)	Sophomore	F	5' 8" (1.73 m)		Port Coquitlam, British Columbia	Team British Columbia U18
24		Katie Nokelby (A)	Senior	D	5' 11" (1.8 m)		Anchorage, Alaska	Alaska All-Stars
25		Xylia Lang	Junior	D	5' 7" (1.7 m)		St. Paul, Minnesota	Roseville HS
26		Britainnia Gillanders (A)	Junior	F	5' 10" (1.78 m)		Kyle, Saskatchewan	Warner School
27		Carla Goodwin	Freshman	F	5' 10" (1.78 m)		Fort St. James, British Columbia	Pursuit of Excellence
30		Jolene deBruyn	Sophomore	G	5' 9" (1.75 m)		Grande Prairie, Alberta	Team Alberta U18
31		Sarah McGall	Senior	G	5' 7" (1.7 m)		Owen Sound, Ontario	Ottawa Jr. Senators
39		Morgan Skinner	Freshman	G	5' 7" (1.7 m)		Victoria, British Columbia	Pacific Steelers

== Schedule ==
Date	Opponent^{#}	Rank^{#}	Site	Decision	Result	Record
Regular Season
September 30	at #2 Minnesota*		Ridder Arena • Minneapolis, MN	Jolene deBruyn	L 0–3	0–1–0
October 1	at #2 Minnesota*		Ridder Arena • Minneapolis, MN	Morgan Skinner	L 2–6	0–2–0
October 7	Northeastern*		Lindenwood Ice Arena • Wentzville, MO	Jolene deBruyn	L 0–5	0–3–0
October 8	Northeastern*		Lindenwood Ice Arena • Wentzville, MO	Morgan Skinner	L 1–4	0–4–0
October 28	at Syracuse		Tennity Ice Skating Pavilion • Syracuse, NY	Jolene deBruyn	L 0–4	0–5–0 (0–1–0)
October 29	at Syracuse		Tennity Ice Skating Pavilion • Syracuse, NY	Jolene deBruyn	L 0–4	0–6–0 (0–2–0)
November 4	at Ohio State*		OSU Ice Rink • Columbus, OH	Jolene deBruyn	L 0–4	0–7–0
November 5	at Ohio State*		OSU Ice Rink • Columbus, OH	Morgan Skinner	L 0–3	0–8–0
November 11	at Penn State		Pegula Ice Arena • University Park, PA	Jolene deBruyn	L 2–3	0–9–0 (0–3–0)
November 12	at Penn State		Pegula Ice Arena • University Park, PA	Jolene deBruyn	T 1–1 ^{OT}	0–9–1 (0–3–1)
November 18	RIT		Lindenwood Ice Arena • Wentzville, MO	Jolene deBruyn	W 2–0	1–9–1 (1–3–1)
November 19	RIT		Lindenwood Ice Arena • Wentzville, MO	Jolene deBruyn	L 1–2	1–10–1 (1–4–1)
November 25	at Minnesota State*		Verizon Wireless Center • Mankato, MN	Jolene deBruyn	W 5–1	2–10–1
November 26	at Minnesota State*		Verizon Wireless Center • Mankato, MN	Jolene deBruyn	T 1–1 ^{OT}	2–10–2
December 2	Mercyhurst		Lindenwood Ice Arena • Wentzville, MO	Jolene deBruyn	L 0–4	2–11–2 (1–5–1)
December 3	Mercyhurst		Lindenwood Ice Arena • Wentzville, MO	Jolene deBruyn	W 3–1	3–11–2 (2–5–1)
December 16	#10 North Dakota*		Lindenwood Ice Arena • Wentzville, MO	Jolene deBruyn	L 0–5	3–12–2
December 17	#10 North Dakota*		Lindenwood Ice Arena • Wentzville, MO	Morgan Skinner	W 4–1	4–12–2
January 6, 2017	#1 Wisconsin*		Lindenwood Ice Arena • Wentzville, MO	Jolene deBruyn	L 1–5	4–13–2
January 13	at #7 Robert Morris		84 Lumber Arena • Neville Township, PA	Jolene deBruyn	W 2–1	5–13–2 (3–5–1)
January 14	at #7 Robert Morris		84 Lumber Arena • Neville Township, PA	Morgan Skinner	L 2–5	5–14–2 (3–6–1)
January 20	Syracuse		Lindenwood Ice Arena • Wentzville, MO	Jolene deBruyn	L 0–5	5–15–2 (3–7–1)
January 21	Syracuse		Lindenwood Ice Arena • Wentzville, MO	Jolene deBruyn	L 0–3	5–16–2 (3–8–1)
January 27	at RIT		Gene Polisseni Center • Rochester, NY	Jolene deBruyn	L 0–5	5–17–2 (3–9–1)
January 28	at RIT		Gene Polisseni Center • Rochester, NY	Jolene deBruyn	L 0–1	5–18–2 (3–10–1)
February 10	Penn State		Lindenwood Ice Arena • Wentzville, MO	Jolene deBruyn	L 1–4	5–19–2 (3–11–1)
February 11	Penn State		Lindenwood Ice Arena • Wentzville, MO	Jolene deBruyn	L 0–2	5–20–2 (3–12–1)
February 17	at Mercyhurst		Mercyhurst Ice Center • Erie, PA	Jolene deBruyn	L 2–3	5–21–2 (3–13–1)
February 18	at Mercyhurst		Mercyhurst Ice Center • Erie, PA	Jolene deBruyn	L 1–5	5–22–2 (3–14–1)
February 24	#9 Robert Morris		Lindenwood Ice Arena • Wentzville, MO	Jolene deBruyn	L 1–2	5–23–2 (3–15–1)
February 25	#9 Robert Morris		Lindenwood Ice Arena • Wentzville, MO	Jolene deBruyn	L 0–3	5–24–2 (3–16–1)
CHA Tournament
March 2	vs. Mercyhurst*		HarborCenter • Buffalo, NY (Quarterfinal Game)	Jolene deBruyn	W 3–2	6–24–2
March 3	vs. Robert Morris*		HarborCenter • Buffalo, NY (Semifinal Game)	Jolene deBruyn	L 1–2	6–25–2
*Non-conference game. ^{#}Rankings from USCHO.com Poll.

== Awards and honors ==
- Jolene deBruyne, CHA Goaltender of the Month, November, 2016
- Courtney Ganske D, 2016–17 All-CHA Rookie Team
