= Geneviève Bannon =

Canadian ice hockey forward

- Born: February 3, 1995 (age 31) Châteauguay, Québec, Canada
- Height: 170 cm (5 ft 7 in)
- Position: Right wing
- Shoots: Right
- Played for: PWHPA; Les Canadiennes de Montréal; Göteborg HC; Clarkson University
- Playing career: 2013–present
Medal record
Women's ball hockey
Representing Canada
World Championship
Gold medal – first place	2022 Canada

Geneviève Bannon (born February 3, 1995) is a Canadian ice hockey forward, who last played with the Montréal section of the Professional Women's Hockey Players Association (PWHPA).

== Playing career ==
Bannon began playing hockey at the age of four. She attended Collège Charles-Lemoyne before finishing her high school at the Ontario Hockey Academy. She then moved to the United States to attend Clarkson University, where she studied psychology and played for the university's women's hockey programme. Across 160 NCAA games with Clarkson, she scored 150 points, twice winning the NCAA championship.

After graduating, she moved to Sweden to sign her first professional contract with newly-promoted Göteborg HC in the Swedish Women's Hockey League (Swedish: Svenska damhockeyligan, SDHL), and was named an assistant captain for the club. In December 2017, she scored all five goals for Göteborg in a 5-2 victory over Brynäs IF. She finished the 2017–18 season with 33 points in 34 games, leading the club in scoring and one of only three Göteborg players to score more than 10 points, as the club finished in last. She added another 5 points in 2 relegation playoff games as the club was able to keep their spot in the top flight.

After one year in Sweden, she returned to North America to sign with Les Canadiennes de Montréal, after being drafted by them 12th overall in the 2018 CWHL Draft. She scored 7 points in 26 games in her debut Canadian Women's Hockey League (CWHL) season.

After the collapse of the CWHL in May 2019, she joined the players forming the Professional Women's Hockey Players Association (PWHPA). She would spend the entire 2019–20 season with the organisation.

=== International ===
Bannon represented Canada at the 2013 IIHF World Women's U18 Championship, scoring one goal in five games as the country won gold.

== Career statistics ==
			Regular season					Playoffs
Season	Team	League	GP	G	A	Pts	PIM	GP	G	A	Pts	PIM
2017–18	Göteborg HC	SDHL	34	18	15	33	34	–	–	–	–	–
2018–19	Les Canadiennes de Montréal	CWHL	26	2	5	7	4	3	0	0	0	0
2019–20	Montréal	PWHPA	–	–	–	–	–	–	–	–	–	–
CWHL totals			26	2	5	7	4	3	0	0	0	0
SDHL totals			34	18	15	33	34	-	-	-	-	-
