= 2016–17 St. Lawrence Saints women's ice hockey season =

Ninth Appearance, first since 2012, Lost to Boston College 0-6 in Quarterfinal Game
- Conference: 2nd ECAC Hockey
- Home ice: Appleton Arena

Rankings
- USA Today/USA Hockey Magazine: 6th
- USCHO.com: 6th

Record
- Overall: 26-6-4
- Home: 11-3-1
- Road: 14-1-3
- Neutral: 1-2-0

Coaches and captains
- Head coach: Chris Wells
- Assistant coaches: Ted Wisner; Mare MacDougall Bari
- Captain: Kirsten Padalis
- Alternate captain(s): Brooke Webster; Alex Moore

The St. Lawrence Saints represented St. Lawrence University in ECAC women's ice hockey during the 2016–17 NCAA Division I women's ice hockey season. The Saints were among the best teams in the nation, finishing 2nd in the ECAC to National Champions and North Country rivals, Clarkson.

== Recruiting ==
| Player | Position | Nationality | Notes |
| Amanda Butterfield | Defense | Canada | Played for Stoney Creek Jr. Sabres |
| Jaimee Cooke | Defense | United States | Blueliner with East Coast Wizards |
| Jacquie Diffley | Forward | United States | Cooke's teammate on East Coast Wizards |
| Dakota Golde | Defense | United States | Competed with Chicago Mission |
| Kalie Grant | Forward | United States | Played in Canada for Nepean Jr. Wildcats |
| Maggie McLaughlin | Forward | United States | Played with Washington Pride |
| Emily Middagh | Forward | Canada | Selected to Team Manitoba |
| Kayla Vespa | Forward | Canada | Played with Butterfield on Stoney Creek Jr. Sabres |

== 2016–17 Saints ==
| No. | Nat. | Player | Class | Pos | Height | DoB | Hometown | Previous team |
|---|---|---|---|---|---|---|---|---|
| 1 | | Brooke Wolejko | Junior | G | 5' 8" (1.73 m) | | South Windsor, Connecticut | Assabet Valley |
| 2 | | Jaimee Cooke | Freshman | D | 5' 9" (1.75 m) | | Pelham, New Hampshire | East Coast Wizards |
| 3 | | Nadine Edney | Sophomore | F | 5' 3" (1.6 m) | | Mississauga, Ontario | Mississauga Jr. Chiefs |
| 4 | | Jacquie Diffley | Freshman | F | 5' 8" (1.73 m) | | Burlington, Massachusetts | East Coast Wizards |
| 5 | | Kirsten Padalis (C) | Senior | D | 5' 7" (1.7 m) | | Farmington, Michigan | Honeybaked |
| 6 | | Michelle Alonardo | Junior | F | 5' 6" (1.68 m) | | Wilmington, Massachusetts | Governor's Academy |
| 7 | | Alex Moore (A) | Senior | F | 5' 11" (1.8 m) | | Napanee, Ontario | Team Ontario |
| 8 | | Kalie Grant | Freshman | F | 5' 4" (1.63 m) | | Potsdam, New York | Nepean Jr. Wildcats |
| 9 | | Kayla Vespa | Freshman | F | 5' 2" (1.57 m) | | Hamilton, Ontario | Stoney Creek Jr. Sabres |
| 10 | | Hannah Miller | Junior | F | 5' 9" (1.75 m) | | North Vancouver, British Columbia | Okanagan Hockey Academy |
| 11 | | Justine Reyes | Sophomore | F | 5' 8" (1.73 m) | | Chino Hills, California | Anaheim Lady Ducks |
| 14 | | Emily Middagh | Freshman | D | 5' 7" (1.7 m) | | Winnipeg, Manitoba | Team Manitoba |
| 16 | | Kennedy Marchment | Junior | F | 5' 8" (1.73 m) | | Courtice, Ontario | Team Ontario Blue |
| 17 | | Lydia Grauer | Sophomore | F | 5' 8" (1.73 m) | | Mukilteo, Washington | Anaheim Lady Ducks |
| 19 | | Maggie McLaughlin | Freshman | F | 5' 8" (1.73 m) | | McLean, Virginia | Washington Pride |
| 20 | | Kayla Nielson | Sophomore | F | 5' 10" (1.78 m) | | Laguna Hills, California | Anaheim Lady Ducks |
| 21 | | Amanda McClure | Junior | D | 5' 7" (1.7 m) | | Stratford, Ontario | Cambridge Jr. Rivulettes |
| 24 | | Dakota Golde | Freshman | D | 5' 6" (1.68 m) | | Rolling Meadows, Illinois | Chicago Mission |
| 26 | | Brooke Webster (A) | Senior | F | 5' 5" (1.65 m) | | Aurora, Ontario | Team Ontario |
| 27 | | Amanda Butterfield | Freshman | D | 5' 8" (1.73 m) | | Grimsby, Ontario | Stoney Creek Jr. Sabres |
| 28 | | Allison Compeau | Sophomore | G | 5' 5" (1.65 m) | | Potsdam, New York | North Country Ice Storm |
| 29 | | Grace Harrison | Sophomore | G | 5' 9" (1.75 m) | | Auckland, New Zealand | Ontario Hockey Academy |
| 31 | | Sonjia Shelly | Sophomore | G | 5' 6" (1.68 m) | | Braceville, Illinois | Chicago Fury |

== 2016-17 Schedule ==
| Date | Opponent^{#} | Rank^{#} | Site | Decision | Result | Record |
Regular Season
| September 30 | at #9 Northeastern* | | Matthews Arena • Boston, MA | Grace Harrison | W 5–0 | 1–0–0 |
| October 1 | at #9 Northeastern* | | Matthews Arena • Boston, MA | Grace Harrison | W 6–5 | 2–0–0 |
| October 7 | #4 Clarkson* | | Appleton Arena • Canton, NY | Grace Harrison | W 2–1 | 3–0–0 |
| October 8 | at #4 Clarkson* | | Cheel Arena • Potsdam, NY | Grace Harrison | T 3–3 ^{OT} | 3–0–1 |
| October 21 | Vermont* | #7 | Appleton Arena • Canton, NY | Grace Harrison | W 3–1 | 4–0–1 |
| October 22 | at Vermont* | #7 | Gutterson Fieldhouse • Burlington, VT | Grace Harrison | W 2–1 | 5–0–1 |
| October 28 | Dartmouth | #7 | Appleton Arena • Canton, NY | Grace Harrison | W 2–0 | 6–0–1 (1–0–0) |
| October 29 | Harvard | #7 | Appleton Arena • Canton, NY | Grace Harrison | W 4–0 | 7–0–1 (2–0–0) |
| November 4 | at #10 Princeton | #7 | Hobey Baker Memorial Rink • Princeton, NJ | Grace Harrison | W 3–1 | 8–0–1 (3–0–0) |
| November 11 | Rensselaer | #4 | Appleton Arena • Canton, NY | Grace Harrison | W 4–1 | 10–0–1 (5–0–0) |
| November 12 | Union | #4 | Appleton Arena • Canton, NY | Brooke Wolejko | W 4–0 | 11–0–1 (6–0–0) |
| November 18 | at Yale | #4 | Ingalls Rink • New Haven, CT | Grace Harrison | W 4–0 | 12–0–1 (7–0–0) |
| November 19 | at Brown | #4 | Meehan Auditorium • Providence, RI | Brooke Wolejko | W 5–0 | 13–0–1 (8–0–0) |
| November 21 | at Penn State* | #3 | Pegula Ice Arena • University Park, PA | Grace Harrison | W 3–0 | 14–0–1 |
| November 22 | at Penn State* | #3 | Pegula Ice Arena • University Park, PA | Grace Harrison | W 2–0 | 15–0–1 |
| December 1 | at Clarkson | #3 | Cheel Arena • Potsdam, NY | Grace Harrison | T 3–3 ^{OT} | 15–0–2 (8–0–1) |
| December 3 | Clarkson | #3 | Appleton Arena • Canton, NY | Grace Harrison | L 1–4 | 15–1–2 (8–1–1) |
| January 7, 2017 | vs. Mercyhurst* | #4 | Kettler Capitals Iceplex • Arlington, VA (D1 in DC) | Grace Harrison | L 2–5 | 15–2–2 |
| January 8 | vs. Mercyhurst* | #4 | Kettler Capitals Iceplex • Arlington, VA (D1 in DC) | Sonjia Shelly | W 3–2 | 16–2–2 |
| January 13 | Brown | #5 | Appleton Arena • Canton, NY | Grace Harrison | W 7–2 | 17–2–2 (9–1–1) |
| January 14 | Yale | #5 | Appleton Arena • Canton, NY | Grace Harrison | W 4–1 | 18–2–2 (10–1–1) |
| January 20 | Colgate | #5 | Appleton Arena • Canton, NY | Grace Harrison | L 3–4 ^{OT} | 18–3–2 (10–2–1) |
| January 21 | #10 Cornell | #5 | Appleton Arena • Canton, NY | Grace Harrison | W 5–2 | 19–3–2 (11–2–1) |
| January 27 | at Union | #5 | Achilles Center • Schenectady, NY | Grace Harrison | W 8–1 | 20–3–2 (12–2–1) |
| January 28 | at Rensselaer | #5 | Houston Field House • Troy, NY | Grace Harrison | W 5–2 | 21–3–2 (13–2–1) |
| February 3 | at Harvard | #5 | Bright-Landry Hockey Center • Allston, MA | Grace Harrison | W 2–1 | 22–3–2 (14–2–1) |
| February 4 | at Dartmouth | #5 | Thompson Arena • Hanover, NH | Grace Harrison | W 2–1 | 23–3–2 (15–2–1) |
| February 11 | #9 Quinnipiac | #3 | Appleton Arena • Canton, NY | Grace Harrison | T 1–1 ^{OT} | 23–3–3 (15–2–2) |
| February 12 | #10 Princeton | #3 | Appleton Arena • Canton, NY | Grace Harrison | L 2–4 | 23–4–3 (15–3–2) |
| February 17 | at #7 Cornell | #5 | Lynah Rink • Ithaca, NY | Grace Harrison | T 2–2 ^{OT} | 23–4–4 (15–3–3) |
| February 18 | at Colgate | #5 | Class of 1965 Arena • Hamilton, NY | Grace Harrison | W 3–0 | 24–4–4 (16–3–3) |
ECAC Tournament
| February 24 | Yale* | #5 | Appleton Arena • Canton, NY (Quarterfinals, Game 1) | Grace Harrison | W 4–1 | 25–4–4 |
| February 25 | Yale* | #5 | Appleton Arena • Canton, NY (Quarterfinals, Game 2) | Grace Harrison | W 4–0 | 26–4–4 |
| March 4 | vs. #7 Cornell* | #4 | Cheel Arena • Potsdam, NY (Semifinal Game) | Grace Harrison | L 1–3 | 26–5–4 |
NCAA Tournament
| March 11 | at #4 Boston College* | #6 | Kelley Rink • Chestnut Hill, MA (Quarterfinal Game) | Grace Harrison | L 0–6 | 26–6–4 |
*Non-conference game. ^{#}Rankings from USCHO.com Poll.

== Awards and honors ==
- Kennedy Marchment, Forward, Patty Kazmaier Award Top 10 Finalist
- Brooke Webster, Forward, Patty Kazmaier Award Top 10 Finalist
- Brooke Webster, 2016-17 AHCA-CCM Women's University Division I Second Team All-American
- Kennedy Marchment, Forward, All-ECAC First Team
- Brooke Webster, Forward, All-ECAC First Team
- Grace Harrison, Goaltender, All-ECAC Second Team
- Hannah Miller, Forward, All-ECAC Second Team
- Kirsten Padalis, Defense, All-ECAC Second Team
