= Jaycee Gebhard =

Canadian ice hockey forward

- Born: June 2, 1997 (age 29) Plenty, Saskatchewan, Canada
- Height: 160 cm (5 ft 3 in)
- Position: Centre
- Shoots: Left
- SDHL team: Brynäs IF
- Played for: Robert Morris Colonials
- National team: Canada
- Playing career: 2016–present

Jaycee Gebhard (born June 2, 1997) is a retired Canadian ice hockey centre, who last played with Brynäs IF Dam of the Swedish Women's Hockey League (SDHL). Selected in the first round, 6th overall in the 2020 NWHL Draft, she was the first ever draft pick of the Toronto Six of the National Women's Hockey League (NWHL).

== Playing career ==
Across 139 NCAA games, Gebhard scored 198 points, setting the all-time career point record for the Robert Morris Colonials women's ice hockey program. She was named College Hockey America (CHA) Rookie of the Year and Women's Hockey Commissioners Association National Rookie of the Year in her first season. She was a Patty Kazmaier Memorial Award nominee in 2020, and was a finalist for the CHA Player of the Year award.

In April 2020, Gebhard was selected in the first round, 6th overall in the 2020 NWHL Draft by the Toronto Six expansion team, being the first player to be drafted in the team's history. The following month, she would sign her first professional contract with Brynäs IF in Sweden.

In 2025, Gebhard was inducted to the Robert Morris University athletics hall of fame.

=== International ===
Gebhard was an assistant captain for Team Canada at the 2015 IIHF World Women's U18 Championship, putting up four points in five games and winning a silver medal.
