= Cayley Mercer =

Canadian ice hockey player

- Born: January 18, 1994 (age 31) Exeter, Ontario, Canada
- Height: 5 ft 8 in (173 cm)
- Weight: 132 lb (60 kg; 9 st 6 lb)
- Position: Forward
- Shoots: Left
- Played for: Shenzhen KRS Vanke Rays; Vanke Rays; Clarkson Golden Knights (NCAA)
- National team: Canada
- Playing career: 2008–present

Cayley Mercer (born January 18, 1994) is a Canadian women's ice hockey player. She most recently played with the Shenzhen KRS Vanke Rays of the Canadian Women's Hockey League (CWHL) in the 2018–19 season.

Mercer played with the Clarkson Golden Knights women's ice hockey program from 2013 to 2017 and was a Top-3 Finalist for the 2017 Patty Kazmaier Award. Her career at Clarkson saw her win two Division 1 National Championships with the Golden Knights, and she graduated as the program's all-time leader in career goals scored, and second all time in career points.

At the 2017 CWHL Draft, she was the first-ever player selected by the Vanke Rays, taken seventh overall. In the 2017–18 CWHL season, Mercer finished second in the CWHL with 41 points in 28 games, behind only Kelli Stack.

== Awards and honours ==
- Top-3 Finalist for the 2017 Patty Kazmaier Award
- First Team All American 2017
- USCHO Player of the Year 2017
- USCHO First Team Honors 2017
- Frozen Four Most Outstanding Player 2017
- Frozen Four All Tournament Team 2017
- ECAC Player of the Year 2017
- ECAC Forward of the Year 2017
- ECAC First Team All League 2017
- ECAC All Tournament Team 2017
- Clarkson University Female Athlete of the Year (2017)
- Clarkson University Women's Hockey MVP (2015, 2016, 2017)
- ECAC First Team All League 2016
- ECAC First Team All League 2015
- Most Sportsmanlike Player, 2011 Canadian U18 National Tournament
