= Tennity Ice Skating Pavilion =

Ice arena in Syracuse, New York, U.S.

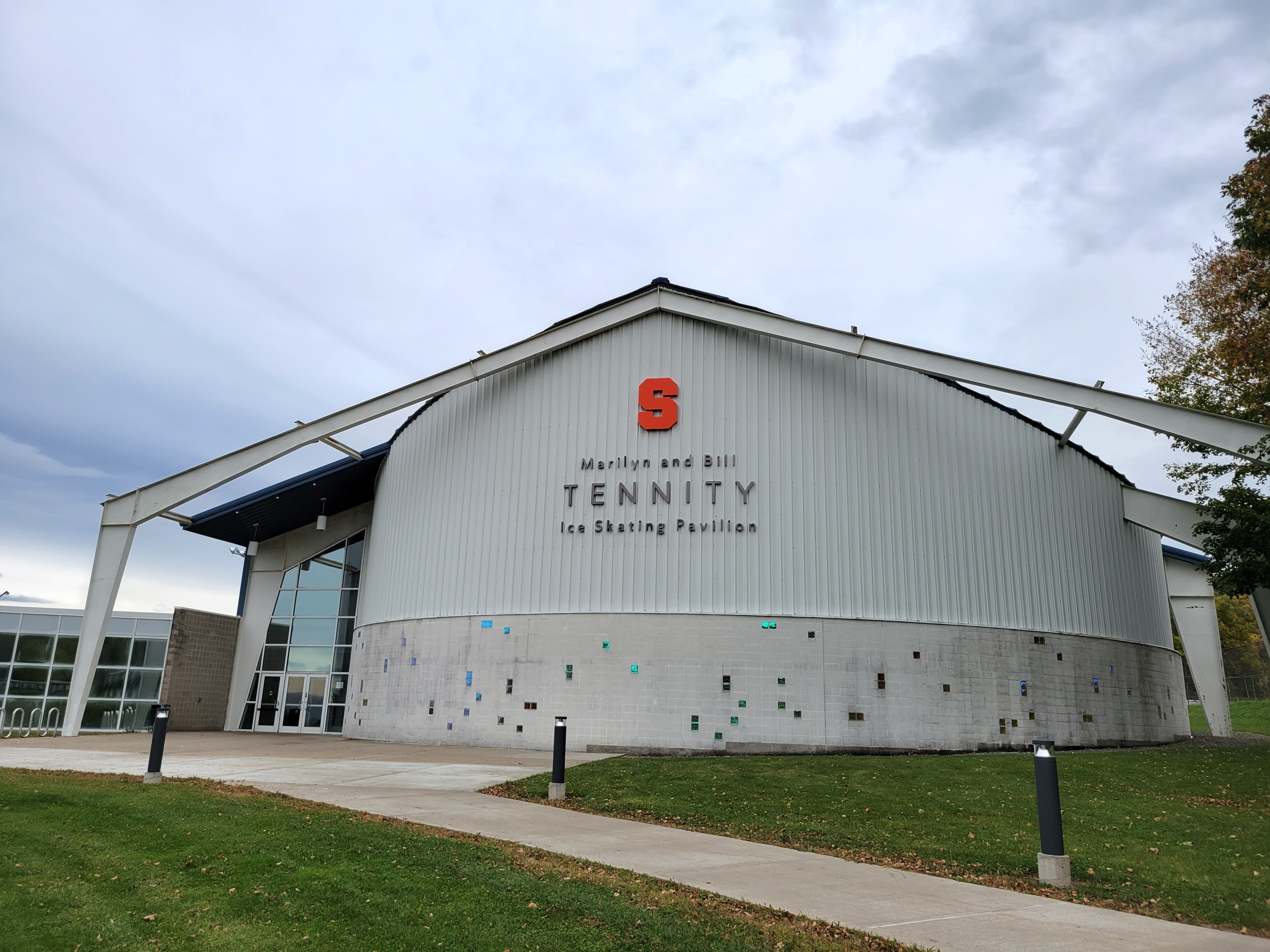
- Interactive map of Tennity Ice Skating Pavilion
- Location: 511 Skytop Road, Syracuse, New York, U.S.
- Coordinates: 43°0′52″N 76°06′59″W
- Owner: Syracuse University
- Operator: Syracuse University
- Capacity: 350
- Surface: ice 200–85 ft (61–26 m)

Construction
- Opened: October 2000

Tenants
- Syracuse Orange (Women's ice hockey) (NCAA); Men's ice hockey (ACHA); Synchronized skating Curling (CCUSA)

The Tennity Ice Skating Pavilion (The TIP) is an ice arena in Syracuse, New York. Named for donors Marilyn and Bill Tennity, the facility opened in October 2000 for the use of Syracuse University students. The facility is the home of Syracuse University's ACHA Division I men's hockey team competing in the Eastern States Collegiate Hockey League, and NCAA Division I women's program playing in the Atlantic Hockey America conference. The Ice Pavilion is also used for intramural hockey and broomball leagues, as well as Syracuse University physical education classes. The new women's hockey team locker room was designed by QPK Design.

The facility features two ice sheets, a regulation NHL sized surface and a 94–85 ft (29–26 m) oblong studio rink for ice skating and figure skating.

== See also ==
- Syracuse Orange
- Syracuse Orange women's ice hockey
