= 2016–17 Northeastern Huskies women's ice hockey season =

- Conference: 2nd WHEA
- Home ice: Matthews Arena

Record
- Overall: 22–12–3
- Home: 10–8–2
- Road: 11–3–1
- Neutral: 0–1–0

Coaches and captains
- Head coach: Dave Flint
- Assistant coaches: Jeff Pellegrini; Nick Carpenito
- Captain(s): Ainsley MacMillan; Sarah Foss
- Alternate captain(s): Paige Savage; Melissa Haganey

The Northeastern Huskies represent Northeastern University in the Women's Hockey East Association during the 2016–17 NCAA Division I women's ice hockey season.

== Recruiting ==
Player	Position	Nationality	Notes
Paige Capistran	Defender	United States	Played for the Mid-Fairfield Stars
Bailey Coyne	Forward	United States	Sister of NU alum Kendall Coyne
Codie Cross	Defender	Canada	Former Member of Team Canada U-18
Matti Hartman	Forward	United States	Starred for Team USA U-18
Andrea Renner	Forward	United States	On Chicago Young Americans squad

== Roster ==
=== 2016–17 Huskies ===
No.	Nat.	Player	Class	Pos	Height	DoB	Hometown	Previous team
2		Lauren Kelly	Junior	D	5' 6" (1.68 m)		Watertown, Massachusetts	Winchendon School
3		Morgan Crane	Sophomore	F	5' 10" (1.78 m)		Northfield, Illinois	Chicago Young Americans
4		Codie Cross	Freshman	D	5' 3" (1.6 m)		Airdrie, Alberta	Team Canada U-18
5		Halle Silva	Junior	F	5' 0" (1.52 m)		Acushnet, Massachusetts	Tabor Academy
6		Shelby Herrington	Junior	D	6' 1" (1.85 m)		Bow, New Hampshire	Bishop Brady
7		McKenna Brand	Junior	F	5' 6" (1.68 m)		Nevis, Minnesota	North American Hockey Academy
8		Andrea Renner	Freshman	F	5' 4" (1.63 m)		Arlington Heights, Illinois	Chicago Young Americans
11		Christina Zalewski	Junior	F	5' 4" (1.63 m)		Canonsburg, Pennsylvania	Williston Nothampton
12		Paige Capistran	Freshman	F	5' 4" (1.63 m)		Manchester, New Hampshire	Mid-Fairfield CT Stars
13		Taytum Clairmont	Junior	F	5' 4" (1.63 m)		Waterloo, Ontario	Toronto Aeros
14		Hayley Scamurra	Senior	F	5' 8" (1.73 m)		Williamsville, New York	Oakville Jr. Hornets
16		Matti Hartman	Freshman	F	5' 8" (1.73 m)		Etna, New Hampshire	Team USA U-18
17		Bailey Coyne	Freshman	F	5' 3" (1.6 m)		Palos Heights, IL	Mid-Fairfield CT Stars
19		Mellissa Haganey (A)	Senior	F	5' 4" (1.63 m)		Franklin, Massachusetts	Loomis Chaffee
21		Sarah Foss (C)	Senior	G	5' 4" (1.63 m)		North Reading, Massachusetts	National Sports Academy
23		Hayley Masters	Senior	F	5' 8" (1.73 m)		Shanty Bay, Ontario	Mississauga Jr. Chiefs
26		Heather Mottau	Senior	D	5' 6" (1.68 m)		Milton, Massachusetts	Shattuck-St. Mary's
27		Maddie Hartman	Sophomore	D	5' 7" (1.7 m)		Deer Park, Illinois	Chicago Young Americans
28		Paige Savage	Senior (RS)	F	5' 8" (1.73 m)		Johns Creek, Georgia	North American Hockey Academy
30		Brianna Storms	Sophomore	G	5' 5" (1.65 m)		Sabin, Minnesota	Moorhead HS
37		Kasidy Anderson	Sophomore	F	5' 10" (1.78 m)		Shaker Heights, Ohio	Shaker Heights HS
39		Brittany Bugalski	Sophomore	G	5' 9" (1.75 m)		Boynton Beach, Florida	Team USA
41		Denisa Krížová	Junior	F	5' 5" (1.65 m)		Horni Cerekev, Czech Republic	National Sports Academy
66		Ainsley MacMillan (C)	Junior	D	5' 6" (1.68 m)		Ilderton, Ontario	Mississauga Jr. Chiefs

== Schedule ==
Date	Opponent^{#}	Rank^{#}	Site	Decision	Result	Record
Regular Season
September 30	St. Lawrence*	#9	Matthews Arena • Boston, MA	Brittany Bugalski	L 0–5	0–1–0
October 1	St. Lawrence*	#9	Matthews Arena • Boston, MA	Sarah Foss	L 5–6	0–2–0
October 7	at Lindenwood*		Lindenwood Ice Arena • Wentzville, MO	Brittany Bugalski	W 5–0	1–2–0
October 8	at Lindenwood*		Lindenwood Ice Arena • Wentzville, MO	Brittany Bugalski	W 4–1	2–2–0
October 14	Syracuse*		Matthews Arena • Boston, MA	Brittany Bugalski	T 2–2 ^{OT}	2–2–1
October 15	Syracuse*		Matthews Arena • Boston, MA	Brittany Bugalski	W 1–0	3–2–1
October 18	Boston University		Matthews Arena • Boston, MA	Brittany Bugalski	W 6–2	4–2–1 (1–0–0)
October 21	at Dartmouth*		Thompson Arena • Hanover, NH	Brittany Bugalski	W 3–0	5–2–1
October 25	at Boston University		Walter Brown Arena • Boston, MA	Brittany Bugalski	W 4–3	6–2–1 (2–0–0)
October 28	Merrimack		Matthews Arena • Boston, MA	Brittany Bugalski	L 2–3	6–3–1 (2–1–0)
November 5	Maine		Matthews Arena • Boston, MA	Brittany Bugalski	W 3–2	7–3–1 (3–1–0)
November 6	Providence		Matthews Arena • Boston, MA	Brittany Bugalski	W 2–1	8–3–1 (4–1–0)
November 11	at Merrimack		Volpe Complex • North Andover, MA	Brittany Bugalski	W 4–2	9–3–1 (5–1–0)
November 12	Merrimack		Matthews Arena • Boston, MA	Brittany Bugalski	W 4–2	10–3–1 (6–1–0)
November 18	at Vermont	#10	Gutterson Fieldhouse • Burlington, VT	Brittany Bugalski	T 3–3 ^{OT}	10–3–2 (6–1–1)
November 20	#6 Boston College	#10	Matthews Arena • Boston, MA	Brittany Bugalski	T 2–2 ^{OT}	10–3–3 (6–1–2)
November 26	#6 Boston College	#10	Matthews Arena • Boston, MA	Brittany Bugalski	L 2–4	10–4–3 (6–2–2)
November 30	at Providence	#10	Schneider Arena • Providence, RI	Brittany Bugalski	W 5–3	11–4–3 (7–2–2)
December 3	Vermont	#10	Matthews Arena • Boston, MA	Brittany Bugalski	L 1–2 ^{OT}	11–5–3 (7–3–2)
December 4	Vermont	#10	Matthews Arena • Boston, MA	Brittany Bugalski	L 2–3 ^{OT}	11–6–3 (7–4–2)
January 2, 2017	at Connecticut		Freitas Ice Forum • Storrs, CT	Brittany Bugalski	W 4–2	12–6–3 (8–4–2)
January 6	New Hampshire		Matthews Arena • Boston, MA	Brittany Bugalski	L 2–3 ^{OT}	12–7–3 (8–5–2)
January 7	at New Hampshire		Whittemore Center • Durham, NH	Brittany Bugalski	W 3–0	13–7–3 (9–5–2)
January 13	at Maine		Alfond Arena • Orono, ME	Brittany Bugalski	L 1–3	13–8–3 (9–6–2)
January 14	at Maine		Alfond Arena • Orono, ME	Sarah Foss	L 3–6	13–9–3 (9–7–2)
January 20	at Connecticut		Freitas Ice Forum • Storrs, CT	Brittany Bugalski	W 3–2	14–9–3 (10–7–2)
January 21	Connecticut		Matthews Arena • Boston, MA	Brittany Bugalski	W 5–3	15–9–3 (11–7–2)
January 28	at New Hampshire		Whittemore Center • Durham, NH	Brittany Bugalski	W 6–0	16–9–3 (12–7–2)
January 31	Harvard*		Matthews Arena • Boston, MA (Beanpot, Opening Round)	Brittany Bugalski	W 4–1	17–9–3
February 3	Providence		Matthews Arena • Boston, MA	Sarah Foss	W 4–3 ^{OT}	18–9–3 (13–7–2)
February 7	#6 Boston College*		Matthews Arena • Boston, MA (Beanpot Championship)	Brittany Bugalski	L 1–2	18–10–3
February 10	at #6 Boston College		Kelley Rink • Chestnut Hill, MA	Brittany Bugalski	W 2–1	19–10–3 (14–7–2)
February 17	at #6 Boston University		Walter Brown Arena • Boston, MA	Brittany Bugalski	L 2–7	19–11–3 (14–8–2)
WHEA Tournament
February 24	Connecticut*		Matthews Arena • Boston, MA (Quarterfinals, Game 1)	Brittany Bugalski	W 6–2	20–11–3
February 25	Connecticut*		Matthews Arena • Boston, MA (Quarterfinals, Game 2)	Brittany Bugalski	W 3–2 ^{OT}	21–11–3
March 4	at Boston University*		Walter Brown Arena • Boston, MA (Semifinal Game)	Brittany Bugalski	W 3–2	22–11–3
March 5	vs. #6 Boston College*		Walter Brown Arena • Boston, MA (Championship Game)	Brittany Bugalski	L 1–2 ^{OT}	22–11–3
*Non-conference game. ^{#}Rankings from USCHO.com Poll.

== Awards and honors ==
- Brittany Bugalski was named WHEA Goaltender of the month for September, October and November, 2016.
- Denisa Krížová was named WHEA player of the month for January, 2017.
- Hayley Scamurra named 2017 WHEA Best Defensive Forward
- McKenna Brand (Forward) named 2017 WHEA First Team All-Star
- Denisa Krížová (Forward) named 2017 WHEA Second Team All-Star
- Heather Mottau (Defender) named 2017 WHEA Second Team All-Star
