= 2016–17 Vermont Catamounts women's ice hockey season =

- Conference: 4th (tied) WHEA
- Home ice: Gutterson Fieldhouse

Record
- Overall: 15–14–9
- Home: 8–5–5
- Road: 7–8–4
- Neutral: 0–1–0

Coaches and captains
- Head coach: Jim Plumer
- Assistant coaches: Kelly Nash; Ashley Salerno
- Captain(s): Rachel Ade; Sarah Kelley; Taylor Willard

The Vermont Catamounts represented the University of Vermont in Women's Hockey East Association play during the 2016–17 NCAA Division I women's ice hockey season.

== Offseason ==
- April 5: Amanda Pelkey ('15) won a Gold Medal with Team USA at the 2016 IIHF World Championships in British Columbia.
- July 29: Eve-Audrey Picard(Canada) and Taylor Willard (USA) were selected to their respective National Development Teams.

=== Recruiting ===
| Player | Position | Nationality | Notes |
|---|---|---|---|
| Melissa Black | Goaltender | Canada | Played for Aurora Jr. Panthers |
| Allie Granato | Forward | United States | Niece of Hall-of-Famer Cammi Granato |
| Ali O'Leary | Forward | United States | Rated by ESPN as best female HS Hockey Player from Massachusetts in 2016 |
| Eve-Audrey Picard | Forward | Canada | Gold Medalist with Team Canada U-18 |
| Sydney Scobee | Goaltender | United States | Attended Breck School |

== Roster ==
=== 2016–17 Catamounts ===
| No. | Nat. | Player | Class | Pos | Height | DoB | Hometown | Previous team |
|---|---|---|---|---|---|---|---|---|
| 2 | | Kourtney Menches | Junior | F | 5' 2" (1.57 m) | | Greer, South Carolina | Shattuck-St. Mary's |
| 4 | | Sammy Kolowrat | Sophomore | F | 5' 7" (1.7 m) | | Prague, Czech Republic | Czech National Team |
| 5 | | Casey Leveillee | Senior | F | 5' 6" (1.68 m) | | Delanson, New York | Northfield Mount Hermon |
| 7 | | Rachel Ade (C) | Senior | D | 5' 9" (1.75 m) | | Davenport, Florida | Boston Shamrocks |
| 10 | | Mackenzie MacNeil | Junior | F | 5' 8" (1.73 m) | | Richmond Hill, Ontario | Toronto Aeros |
| 11 | | Katherine Pate | Junior | D | 5' 2" (1.57 m) | | Saco, Maine | Assabet Valley |
| 12 | | Amanda Drobot | Junior | D | 5' 6" (1.68 m) | | Churchville, Pennsylvania | New Jersey Colonials |
| 14 | | Ali O'Leary | Freshman | F | 5' 4" (1.63 m) | | Reading, Massachusetts | Boston Shamrocks |
| 16 | | Bridget Baker | Senior | F | 5' 3" (1.6 m) | | Los Gatos, California | Pursuit of Excellence |
| 17 | | Bella Webster | Junior | F | 5' 6" (1.68 m) | | Bensenville, Illinois | Chicago Mission |
| 18 | | Cassidy Campeau | Senior | F | 5' 6" (1.68 m) | | Nepean, Ontario | Nepean Wildcats |
| 20 | | Rachel Khalouf | Sophomore | D | 5' 8" (1.73 m) | | Pittsburgh, Pennsylvania | Pittsburgh Penguins Elite |
| 21 | | Allie Granato | Freshman | F | 5' 3" (1.6 m) | | Plainfield, Illinois | Chicago Fury |
| 22 | | Sarah Kelly (C) | Senior | F | 5' 5" (1.65 m) | | Vestal, New York | North American Hockey Academy |
| 23 | | Alyssa Gorecki | Sophomore | F | 5' 4" (1.63 m) | | Monee, Illinois | US National Team U18 |
| 24 | | Saana Valkama | Sophomore | F | 5' 6" (1.68 m) | | Pirkkala, Finland | Finland National Team |
| 26 | | Eve-Audrey Pickard | Freshman | F | 5' 6" (1.68 m) | | Longueuil, Quebec | Team Canada U-18 |
| 27 | | Taylor Willard (C) | Junior | D | 5' 6" (1.68 m) | | Naperville, Illinois | US National Team U18 |
| 30 | | Madison Litchfield | Senior | G | 5' 4" (1.63 m) | | Williston, Vermont | Boston Shamrocks |
| 33 | | Melissa Black | Sophomore | G | 5' 5" (1.65 m) | | Newmarket, Ontario | Union (NCAA) |
| 37 | | Sydney Scobee | Freshman | G | 6' 0" (1.83 m) | | Minnetrista, Minnesota | Breck School |
| 44 | | Victoria Andreakos | Senior | F | 5' 6" (1.68 m) | | Aurora, Ontario | Toronto Aeros |
| 77 | | Daria O'Neill | Sophomore | D | 5' 9" (1.75 m) | | Cochrane, Alberta | Edge School |

== Schedule ==
| Date | Opponent^{#} | Rank^{#} | Site | Decision | Result | Record |
Regular Season
| October 4 | at Union* | | Achilles Center • Schenectady, NY | Madison Litchfield | W 5–1 | 1–0–0 |
| October 9 | #9 Boston University | | Gutterson Fieldhouse • Burlington, VT | Melissa Black | W 3–2 | 2–0–0 (1–0–0) |
| October 14 | at Robert Morris* | | 84 Lumber Arena • Neville Township, PA | Sydney Scobee | L 2–3 | 2–1–0 |
| October 15 | at Robert Morris* | | 84 Lumber Arena • Neville Township, PA | Melissa Black | T 2–2 ^{OT} | 2–1–1 |
| October 21 | at #6 St. Lawrence* | | Appleton Arena • Canton, NY | Melissa Black | L 1–3 | 2–2–1 |
| October 22 | #6 St. Lawrence* | | Gutterson Fieldhouse • Burlington, VT | Madison Litchfield | L 1–2 | 2–3–1 |
| October 28 | at New Hampshire | | Whittemore Center • Durham, NH | Melissa Black | L 2–4 | 2–4–1 (1–1–0) |
| October 30 | at Maine | | Alfond Arena • Orono, ME | Madison Litchfield | W 3–2 | 3–4–1 (2–1–0) |
| November 12 | at Providence | | Schneider Arena • Providence, RI | Melissa Black | L 2–5 | 3–5–1 (2–2–0) |
| November 13 | at Providence | | Schneider Arena • Providence, RI | Madison Litchfield | T 1–1 ^{OT} | 3–5–2 (2–2–1) |
| November 18 | #10 Northeastern | | Gutterson Fieldhouse • Burlington, VT | Madison Litchfield | T 3–3 ^{OT} | 3–5–3 (2–2–2) |
| November 20 | Connecticut | | Gutterson Fieldhouse • Burlington, VT | Madison Litchfield | T 1–1 ^{OT} | 3–5–4 (2–2–3) |
| November 25 | St. Cloud State* | | Gutterson Fieldhouse • Burlington, VT (Windjammer Classic, Opening Round) | Madison Litchfield | W 5–1 | 4–5–4 |
| November 26 | #5 Clarkson* | | Gutterson Fieldhouse • Burlington, VT (Windjammer Classic Championship) | Madison Litchfield | L 1–3 | 4–6–4 |
| December 3 | at #10 Northeastern | | Matthews Arena • Boston, MA | Melissa Black | W 2–1 ^{OT} | 5–6–4 (3–2–3) |
| December 4 | at #10 Northeastern | | Matthews Arena • Boston, MA | Melissa Black | W 3–2 ^{OT} | 6–6–4 (4–2–3) |
| December 10 | Dartmouth* | | Gutterson Fieldhouse • Burlington, VT | Sydney Scobee | W 4–2 | 7–6–4 |
| December 30 | Yale* | | Gutterson Fieldhouse • Burlington, VT | Melissa Black | T 2–2 ^{OT} | 7–6–5 |
| December 31 | Yale* | | Gutterson Fieldhouse • Burlington, VT | Madison Litchfield | W 2–1 | 8–6–5 |
| January 3, 2017 | at Merrimack | | Volpe Complex • North Andover, MA | Melissa Black | L 1–2 ^{OT} | 8–7–5 (4–3–3) |
| January 7 | Maine | | Gutterson Fieldhouse • Burlington, VT | Melissa Black | W 4–1 | 9–7–5 (5–3–3) |
| January 8 | Maine | | Gutterson Fieldhouse • Burlington, VT | Madison Litchfield | W 3–1 | 10–7–5 (6–3–3) |
| January 14 | at Boston University | | Walter Brown Arena • Boston, MA | Melissa Black | T 3–3 ^{OT} | 10–7–6 (6–3–4) |
| January 15 | at Boston University | | Walter Brown Arena • Boston, MA | Madison Litchfield | T 1–1 ^{OT} | 10–7–7 (6–3–5) |
| January 20 | #6 Boston College | | Gutterson Fieldhouse • Burlington, VT | Melissa Black | L 2–3 ^{OT} | 10–8–7 (6–4–5) |
| January 21 | #6 Boston College | | Gutterson Fieldhouse • Burlington, VT | Madison Litchfield | L 0–3 | 10–9–7 (6–5–5) |
| January 27 | at Connecticut | | Freitas Ice Forum • Storrs, CT | Madison Litchfield | W 4–2 | 11–9–7 (7–5–5) |
| January 28 | at Connecticut | | Freitas Ice Forum • Storrs, CT | Melissa Black | L 1–2 | 11–10–7 (7–6–5) |
| February 3 | New Hampshire | | Gutterson Fieldhouse • Burlington, VT | Madison Litchfield | T 3–3 ^{OT} | 11–10–8 (7–6–6) |
| February 4 | New Hampshire | | Gutterson Fieldhouse • Burlington, VT | Madison Litchfield | W 3–1 | 12–10–8 (8–6–6) |
| February 10 | Providence | | Gutterson Fieldhouse • Burlington, VT | Madison Litchfield | T 2–2 | 12–10–9 (8–6–7) |
| February 12 | at #6 Boston College | | Kelley Rink • Chestnut Hill, MA | Madison Litchfield | L 1–7 | 12–11–9 (8–7–7) |
| February 17 | Merrimack | | Gutterson Fieldhouse • Burlington, VT | Madison Litchfield | W 4–3 | 13–11–9 (9–7–7) |
| February 18 | Merrimack | | Gutterson Fieldhouse • Burlington, VT | Madison Litchfield | L 2–3 | 13–12–9 (9–8–7) |
WHEA Tournament
| February 24 | at Providence* | | Schneider Arena • Providence, RI (Quarterfinals, Game 1) | Madison Litchfield | L 4–5 | 13–13–9 |
| February 25 | at Providence* | | Schneider Arena • Providence, RI (Quarterfinals, Game 2) | Madison Litchfield | W 5–1 | 14–13–9 |
| February 26 | at Providence* | | Schneider Arena • Providence, RI (Quarterfinals, Game 3) | Madison Litchfield | W 5–2 | 15–13–9 |
| March 4 | vs. #6 Boston College* | | Walter Brown Arena • Boston, MA (Semifinal Game) | Madison Litchfield | L 3–4 ^{2OT} | 15–14–9 |
*Non-conference game. ^{#}Rankings from USCHO.com Poll.

== Awards and honors ==
- Melissa Black was named the WHEA Goaltender of the month for December, 2016.
- As a member of the Czech National Team, Sammy Kolowrat was named the top Defender of the Olympic Qualifying Tournament in Arosa, Switzerland.
- Eve-Audrey Picard was the WHEA Rookie of the month for February.
- Eve-Audrey Picard (Forward) was named to the WHEA Pro-Ambitions Rookie All-Star Team.
- Madison Litchfield (Goaltender) was named to the WHEA Second All-Star Team.
- Taylor Willard (Defender) was named to the WHEA Second All-Star Team.
