= 2016–17 New Hampshire Wildcats women's ice hockey season =

Collegiate women's hockey team

- Conference: 6th WHEA
- Home ice: Whittemore Center

Record
- Overall: 14-19-2
- Home: 7-9-0
- Road: 7-10-1
- Neutral: 0-0-1

Coaches and captains
- Head coach: Hilary Witt
- Assistant coaches: Stephanie Jones; Bill Bowes
- Captain(s): Jonna Curtis; Kate Haslett; Marie-Jo Pelletier

The New Hampshire Wildcats represent the University of New Hampshire in Women's Hockey East Association play during the 2016–17 NCAA Division I women's ice hockey season.

== Offseason ==
- April 5: Alum Kacey Bellamy won a gold medal as an alternate captain with Team USA at the 2016 IIHF Ice Hockey Women's World Championship, held in Kamloops, British Columbia

=== Recruiting ===
Player	Position	Nationality	Notes
Abby Chapman	Forward	United States	Played with Detroit Honeybaked
Nicole Dunbar	Forward	United States	Played for Canadian International Hockey Academy
Tori Howran	Defense	Canada	Member of Whitby Jr. Wolves
Meghara McManus	Forward	United States	Attended Dexter Southfield School
Lexie Revkin	Defense	United States	Attended NAHA with Carlee Turner
Hannah Touzos	Forward	United States	From Williston Northampton School
Carlee Turner	Forward	United States	Played on North American Hockey Academy squad

== Roster ==
=== 2016–17 Wildcats ===
No.	Nat.	Player	Class	Pos	Height	DoB	Hometown	Previous team
1		Kyra Smith	Sophomore	G	5' 9" (1.75 m)		Littleton, Colorado	Pomfret School
4		Nicole Dunbar	Freshman	F	5' 6" (1.68 m)		Coto de Caza, California	Canadian Int'l Hockey Academy
5		Julia Fedeski	Junior	D	5' 10" (1.78 m)		Algonquin Highlands, Ontario	Toronto Aeros
6		Jonna Curtis (C)	Senior	F	5' 4" (1.63 m)		Elk River, Minnesota	U19 Minnesota Jr. Whitecaps
7		Lexie Revkin	Freshman	D	5' 3" (1.6 m)		Gaithersburg, Maryland	North American Hockey Academy
8		Hannah Touzos	Freshman	F	5' 6" (1.68 m)		Foxborough, Massachusetts	Williston-Northampton
10		Amy Schlegal	Junior	D	5' 7" (1.7 m)		Blaine, Minnesota	Blaine HS
12		Taylor Wenczkowski	Sophomore	F	5' 7" (1.7 m)		Rochester, New Hampshire	Boston Shamrocks
14		Jenna Rheault	Sophomore	D	5' 7" (1.7 m)		Deering, New Hampshire	St. Paul's School
15		Tori Howran	Freshman	D	5' 9" (1.75 m)		Bancroft, Ontario	Whitby Jr. Wolves
16		Ali Praus	Junior	F	5' 10" (1.78 m)		Long Lake, Minnesota	Benilde St. Margaret's HS
17		Devan Taylor	Sophomore	F	5' 7" (1.7 m)		Billerica, Massachusetts	Lawrence Academy
18		Kate Haslett (C)	Junior	D	5' 4" (1.63 m)		Rothesay, New Brunswick	Brooks School
19		Carlee Turner	Freshman	F	5' 7" (1.7 m)		Scottsdale, Arizona	North American Hockey Academy
20		Abby Chapman	Freshman	F	5' 2" (1.57 m)		Beverly Hills, Michigan	Detroit Honeybaked
21		Marie-Jo Pelletier (C)	Sophomore	D	4' 11" (1.5 m)		Dalhousie, New Brunswick	Team Canada U18
24		Meghara McManus	Freshman	F	5' 4" (1.63 m)		Milton, Massachusetts	Dexter-Southfield School
26		Carlee Toews	Junior	F	5' 5" (1.65 m)		Grande Prairie, Alberta	Okanagan Hockey Academy
27		Caitlyn Radatovich	Sophomore	F	5' 10" (1.78 m)		Advance, North Carolina	Pittsburgh Penguins U19
29		Hilary Cashin	Sophomore	G	5' 11" (1.8 m)		Fredericton, New Brunswick	New Hampton School

== Schedule ==
Date	Opponent^{#}	Rank^{#}	Site	Decision	Result	Record
Regular Season
October 1	at #8 Colgate*		Class of 1965 Arena • Hamilton, NY	Kyra Smith	L 2–4	0–1–0
October 2	at #8 Colgate*		Class of 1965 Arena • Hamilton, NY	Hilary Cashin	L 1–3	0–2–0
October 7	at #9 Boston University		Walter Brown Arena • Boston, MA	Kyra Smith	L 1–5	0–3–0 (0–1–0)
October 8	#3 Quinnipiac*		Whittemore Center • Durham, NH	Hilary Cashin	L 0–3	0–4–0
October 14	#5 Boston College		Whittemore Center • Durham, NH	Kyra Smith	L 1–4	0–5–0 (0–2–0)
October 15	Merrimack		Whittemore Center • Durham, NH	Hilary Cashin	W 6–2	1–5–0 (1–2–0)
October 22	#8 Clarkson*		Whittemore Center • Durham, NH	Kyra Smith	L 1–3	1–6–0
October 23	#8 Clarkson*		Whittemore Center • Durham, NH	Hilary Cashin	L 1–3	1–7–0
October 28	Vermont		Whittemore Center • Durham, NH	Kyra Smith	W 4–2	2–7–0 (2–2–0)
November 5	at Providence		Schneider Arena • Providence, RI	Hilary Cashin	W 4–3	3–7–0 (3–2–0)
November 6	Connecticut		Whittemore Center • Durham, NH	Kyra Smith	L 1–2 ^{OT}	3–8–0 (3–3–0)
November 11	#6 Boston College		Whittemore Center • Durham, NH	Hilary Cashin	L 1–5	3–9–0 (3–4–0)
November 12	at #6 Boston College		Kelley Rink • Chestnut Hill, MA	Kyra Smith	L 1–7	3–10–0 (3–5–0)
November 15	Harvard*		Whittemore Center • Durham, NH	Hilary Cashin	W 3–2 ^{OT}	4–10–0
November 19	at Providence		Schneider Arena • Providence, RI	Kyra Smith	L 3–6	4–11–0 (3–6–0)
November 20	Providence		Whittemore Center • Durham, NH	Hilary Cashin	W 2–1	5–11–0 (4–6–0)
November 26	vs. Maine		Norway Savings Bank Arena • Auburn, ME	Hilary Cashin	T 2–2 ^{OT}	5–11–1 (4–6–1)
December 2	at Merrimack		Volpe Complex • North Andover, MA	Hilary Cashin	W 5–2	6–11–1 (5–6–1)
December 3	Merrimack		Whittemore Center • Durham, NH	Hilary Cashin	W 4–2	7–11–1 (6–6–1)
December 10	at Yale*		Ingalls Rink • New Haven, CT	Hilary Cashin	W 5–3	8–11–1
January 6, 2017	at Northeastern		Matthews Arena • Boston, MA	Hilary Cashin	W 3–2 ^{OT}	9–11–1 (7–6–1)
January 7	Northeastern		Whittemore Center • Durham, NH	Hilary Cashin	L 0–3	9–12–1 (7–7–1)
January 10	at Dartmouth*		Thompson Arena • Hanover, NH	Kyra Smith	L 1–2	9–13–1
January 20	Maine		Whittemore Center • Durham, NH	Hilary Cashin	W 4–1	10–13–1 (8–7–1)
January 21	Maine		Whittemore Center • Durham, NH	Hilary Cashin	W 7–0	11–13–1 (9–7–1)
January 28	Northeastern		Whittemore Center • Durham, NH	Hilary Cashin	L 0–6	11–14–1 (9–8–1)
February 3	at Vermont		Gutterson Fieldhouse • Burlington, VT	Kyra Smith	T 3–3 ^{OT}	11–14–2 (9–8–2)
February 4	at Vermont		Gutterson Fieldhouse • Burlington, VT	Kyra Smith	L 1–3	11–15–2 (9–9–2)
February 10	Boston University		Whittemore Center • Durham, NH	Hilary Cashin	L 3–4	11–16–2 (9–10–2)
February 11	at Boston University		Walter Brown Arena • Boston, MA	Hilary Cashin	L 2–5	11–17–2 (9–11–2)
February 17	at Connecticut		Freitas Ice Forum • Storrs, CT	Hilary Cashin	W 4–1	12–17–2 (10–11–2)
February 18	at Connecticut		Freitas Ice Forum • Storrs, CT	Hilary Cashin	W 4–1	13–17–2 (11–11–2)
WHEA Tournament
February 24	at Boston University*		Walter Brown Arena • Boston, MA (Quarterfinal, Game 1)	Hilary Cashin	W 4–2	14–17–2
February 25	at Boston University*		Walter Brown Arena • Boston, MA (Quarterfinal, Game 2)	Hilary Cashin	L 3–4	14–18–2
February 26	at Boston University*		Walter Brown Arena • Boston, MA (Quarterfinal, Game 3)	Kyra Smith	L 2–3	14–19–2
*Non-conference game. ^{#}Rankings from USCHO.com Poll.
