= 2016–17 RPI Engineers women's ice hockey season =

2016–17 Rensselaer Engineers women's ice hockey season
- Conference: 8th ECAC Hockey
- Home ice: Houston Field House

Record
- Overall: 10-24-2
- Home: 7-12-0
- Road: 3-12-2

Coaches and captains
- Head coach: John Burke
- Assistant coaches: Jake Anderson; Christie Cicero
- Captain(s): Laura Horwood; Lyndsey Hylwa

The Rensselaer Engineers represented Rensselaer Polytechnic Institute in ECAC women's ice hockey during the 2016–17 NCAA Division I women's ice hockey season.

== Offseason ==
- April 5:Josefine Hansen playing for the Danish National Team, was named the 2016 IIHF World Championship Best Defenseman.

=== Recruiting ===
Player	Position	Nationality	Notes
Kendra Farole	Defense	United States	Blueliner for Anaheim Lady Ducks
Megan Hayes	Forward	United States	Attended North American Hockey Academy
Kirsten Iwanski	Defense	United States	Played for Northern Cyclones
Samantha Nolan	Forward	United States	Attended St. Paul's School
Blake Orosz	Forward	United States	Played for Nepean Jr. Wildcats
Sabrina Repaci	Forward	Canada	Played for Toronto Jr. Aeros
Katerina Seper	Defense	United States	Attended Lakeville North (MN) High School

== 2016–17 Engineers ==
No.	Nat.	Player	Class	Pos	Height	DoB	Hometown	Previous team
2		Kendra Farole	Freshman	D	5' 7" (1.7 m)		Irvine, California	Anaheim Lady Ducks
4		Sam Noaln	Freshman	F	6' 1" (1.85 m)		St. Louis, Missouri	St. Paul's School
6		Jaimie Grigsby	Sophomore	F	5' 9" (1.75 m)		Whitby, Ontario	Whitby Jr. Wolves
7		Sabrina Repaci	Freshman	F	5' 5" (1.65 m)		Toronto, Ontario	Toronto Jr. Aeros
8		Megan Hayes	Freshman	F	5' 2" (1.57 m)		Hartford, Vermont	North American Hockey Academy
9		Josefine Hansen	Sophomore	D	5' 4" (1.63 m)		Copenhagen, Denmark	Shattuck-St. Mary's
10		Blake Orosz	Freshman	F	5' 2" (1.57 m)		Chase Mills, New York	Nepean Jr. Wildcats
11		Katerina Seper	Freshman	D	5' 9" (1.75 m)		Lakeville, Minnesota	Lakeville North HS
13		Ana Orzechowski	Sophomore	D	5' 6" (1.68 m)		Tonawanda, New York	Pittsburgh Pens Elite
14		Shayna Tomlinson	Junior	F	5' 6" (1.68 m)		Gilford, New Hampshire	Assabet Valley
15		Laura Horwood (C)	Senior	F	5' 6" (1.68 m)		Belleville, Ontario	Durham West Lightning
16		Kirsten Iwanski	Freshman	D	5' 10" (1.78 m)		Marquette, Michigan	Northern Cyclones
17		Hannah Behounek	Senior	D	5' 7" (1.7 m)		Minnetonka, Minnesota	Minnetonka HS
18		Makenna Thomas	Sophomore	F	5' 8" (1.73 m)		Hartland, Wisconsin	Chicago Young Americans
19		Marisa Raspa	Junior	F	5' 3" (1.6 m)		Downingtown, Pennsylvania	North American Hockey Academy
20		Amanda Kimmerle	Junior	D	5' 9" (1.75 m)		Anoka, Minnesota	Anoka HS
21		Katie Rooney	Senior	F	5' 7" (1.7 m)		Buffalo, Minnesota	Buffalo HS
23		Taylor Schwalbe	Sophomore	F	5' 6" (1.68 m)		Anchorage, Alaska	Shattuck-St. Mary's
25		Whitney Renn	Junior	F	5' 6" (1.68 m)		Troy, Michigan	Detroit Little Caesars
26		Lindsey Hylwa (C)	Senior	F	5' 8" (1.73 m)		Cary, North Carolina	Gilmore Academy
28		Aly Tremblay	Sophomore	F	5' 7" (1.7 m)		Hayward, Wisconsin	Minnesota Revolution
33		Kira Bombay	Sophomore	G	5' 7" (1.7 m)		Orleans, Ontario	Nepean Jr. Wildcats
35		Lovisa Selander	Sophomore	G	5' 11" (1.8 m)		Sollentuna, Sweden	SDE Riksserien

== Schedule ==
Date	Opponent^{#}	Rank^{#}	Site	Decision	Result	Record
Regular Season
September 24	at Maine*		Alfond Arena • Orono, ME	Lovisa Selander	W 3–1	1–0–0
September 25	at Maine*		Alfond Arena • Orono, ME	Lovisa Selander	L 0–2	1–1–0
September 30	Ohio State*		Houston Field House • Troy, NY	Lovisa Selander	L 1–4	1–2–0
October 1	Ohio State*		Houston Field House • Troy, NY	Lovisa Selander	L 0–2	1–3–0
October 7	at Robert Morris*		84 Lumber Arena • Neville Township, PA	Kira Bombay	L 3–6	1–4–0
October 8	at Robert Morris*		84 Lumber Arena • Neville Township, PA	Lovisa Selander	T 1–1 ^{OT}	1–4–1
October 14	Connecticut*		Houston Field House • Troy, NY	Lovisa Selander	W 3–0	2–4–1
October 15	Connecticut*		Houston Field House • Troy, NY	Lovisa Selander	L 1–4	2–5–1
October 28	Cornell		Houston Field House • Troy, NY	Lovisa Selander	W 1–0	3–5–1 (1–0–0)
October 29	#6 Colgate		Houston Field House • Troy, NY	Lovisa Selander	L 1–4	3–6–1 (1–1–0)
November 4	at Yale		Ingalls Rink • New Haven, CT	Lovisa Selander	L 2–7	3–7–1 (1–2–0)
November 5	at Brown		Meehan Auditorium • Providence, RI	Lovisa Selander	W 4–1	4–7–1 (2–2–0)
November 11	at St. Lawrence		Appleton Arena • Canton, NY	Lovisa Selander	L 1–4	4–8–1 (2–3–0)
November 12	at Clarkson		Cheel Arena • Potsdam, NY	Lovisa Selander	L 3–8	4–9–1 (2–4–0)
November 18	Mercyhurst*		Houston Field House • Troy, NY	Kira Bombay	L 1–4	4–10–1
November 19	Mercyhurst*		Houston Field House • Troy, NY	Lovisa Selander	L 1–7	4–11–1
November 25	RIT*		Houston Field House • Troy, NY	Lovisa Selander	W 5–1	5–11–1
November 26	RIT*		Houston Field House • Troy, NY	Lovisa Selander	L 1–3	5–12–1
December 2	Princeton		Houston Field House • Troy, NY	Lovisa Selander	L 0–4	5–13–1 (2–5–0)
December 3	#8 Quinnipiac		Houston Field House • Troy, NY	Lovisa Selander	L 1–6	5–14–1 (2–6–0)
January 6, 2017	Brown		Houston Field House • Troy, NY	Lovisa Selander	W 4–3	6–14–1 (3–6–0)
January 7	Yale		Houston Field House • Troy, NY	Lovisa Selander	W 2–1 ^{OT}	7–14–1 (4–6–0)
January 13	at Harvard		Bright-Landry Hockey Center • Allston, MA	Lovisa Selander	W 3–1	8–14–1 (5–6–0)
January 14	at Dartmouth		Thompson Arena • Hanover, NH	Lovisa Selander	L 1–2 ^{OT}	8–15–1 (5–7–0)
January 20	at Union		Achilles Center • Schenectady, NY	Lovisa Selander	T 2–2 ^{OT}	8–15–2 (5–7–1)
January 21	Union		Houston Field House • Troy, NY	Lovisa Selander	W 2–1	9–15–2 (6–7–1)
January 27	#3 Clarkson		Houston Field House • Troy, NY	Lovisa Selander	L 2–4	9–16–2 (6–8–1)
January 28	#5 St. Lawrence		Houston Field House • Troy, NY	Lovisa Selander	L 2–5	9–17–2 (6–9–1)
February 3	at Colgate		Class of 1965 Arena • Hamilton, NY	Lovisa Selander	L 0–3	9–18–2 (6–10–1)
February 4	at #7 Cornell		Lynah Rink • Ithaca, NY	Lovisa Selander	L 2–3	9–19–2 (6–11–1)
February 10	Dartmouth		Houston Field House • Troy, NY	Lovisa Selander	L 0–4	9–20–2 (6–12–1)
February 11	Harvard		Houston Field House • Troy, NY	Lovisa Selander	W 4–1	10–20–2 (7–12–1)
February 17	at #10 Quinnipiac		High Point Solutions Arena • Hamden, CT	Lovisa Selander	L 0–5	10–21–2 (7–13–1)
February 18	at #9 Princeton		Hobey Baker Memorial Rink • Princeton, NJ	Lovisa Selander	L 2–4	10–22–2 (7–14–1)
ECAC Tournament
February 24	at #3 Clarkson*		Cheel Arena • Potsdam, NY (Quarterfinals, Game 1)	Lovisa Selander	L 1–4	10–23–2
February 25	at #3 Clarkson*		Cheel Arena • Potsdam, NY (Quarterfinals, Game 2)	Lovisa Selander	L 2–5	10–24–2
*Non-conference game. ^{#}Rankings from USCHO.com Poll.
