= 2016–17 UConn Huskies women's ice hockey season =

2016–17 Connecticut Huskies women's ice hockey season
- Conference: 7th WHEA
- Home ice: Freitas Ice Forum

Record
- Overall: 14–18–4
- Home: 5–9–1
- Road: 9–8–2
- Neutral: 0–0–1

Coaches and captains
- Head coach: Chris MacKenzie
- Assistant coaches: Jaclyn Hawkins; Casey Handrahan; Carson Duggan
- Captain(s): Jessica Stott; Justine Fredette

The UConn Huskies women's ice hockey program represented the University of Connecticut Huskies during the 2016–17 NCAA Division I women's ice hockey season.

== Offseason ==
- April 23: Eleven players were honored as WHEA Academic All-Stars.

=== Recruiting ===
.

| Player | Position | Nationality | Notes |
|---|---|---|---|
| Briana Colangelo | Forward | Canada | Teammate of Emily Reid on Whitby Jr. Wolves |
| Catherine Crawley | Forward | United States | Played for Mid-Fairfield Stars |
| Erica D'Ericco | Forward | United States | Captain for the Northern Cyclones |
| Morgan Fisher | Goaltender | United States | Played for Mid-Fairfield Stars with Catherine Crawley |
| Emily Reid | Defender | Canada | Named to Team Ontario Blue |
| Leona Sim | Forward | Canada | Played for Pacific Steelers |
| Tristyn Svetek | Defender | Canada | Member of the Nepean Jr. Wildcats |

== Roster ==
=== 2016–17 Huskies ===
| No. | Nat. | Player | Class | Pos | Height | DoB | Hometown | Previous team |
|---|---|---|---|---|---|---|---|---|
| 3 | | Theresa Knutson | Junior | F | 5' 6" (1.68 m) | | Onalaska, Wisconsin | Team Wisconsin |
| 4 | | Cyndee Cook | Junior | D | 5' 4" (1.63 m) | | Winnipeg, Manitoba | Shaftesbury Prep |
| 5 | | Lexi Lersch | Senior | D | 5' 7" (1.7 m) | | Manhattan Beach, California | Choate Rosemary Hall |
| 6 | | Norah Maclaine | Sophomore | F | 5' 8" (1.73 m) | | Easton, Massachusetts | Oliver Ames HS |
| 7 | | Leah Lum | Junior | D | 5' 5" (1.65 m) | | Richmond, British Columbia | Pacific Steelers |
| 8 | | Rebecca Lindblad | Sophomore | F | 5' 8" (1.73 m) | | Winnetka, Illinois | New Trier HS |
| 9 | | Jessica Stott (C) | Senior | D | 5' 6" (1.68 m) | | Niverville, Manitoba | Shaftesbury Prep |
| 10 | | Lindsay Roethke | Junior | F | 5' 1" (1.55 m) | | Buffalo, Minnesota | Buffalo HS |
| 13 | | Reese Maccario | Junior | F | 5' 3" (1.6 m) | | Marblehead, Massachusetts | Boston Shamrocks |
| 14 | | Justine Fredette (C) | Junior | F | 5' 5" (1.65 m) | | Winnipeg, Manitoba | Shaftesbury Prep |
| 19 | | Leona Sim | Freshman | F | 5' 4" (1.63 m) | | Vancouver, British Columbia | Pacific Steelers |
| 21 | | Erica D'Ericco | Freshman | F | 5' 6" (1.68 m) | | Concord, New Hampshire | Northern Cyclones |
| 22 | | Kelly Harris | Senior | F | 5' 7" (1.7 m) | | Canton, Michigan | Little Caesar |
| 24 | | Morgan Fisher | Freshman | G | 5' 7" (1.7 m) | | Vernon, Connecticut | Mid-Fairfield Stars |
| 28 | | Kayla Mee | Sophomore | D | 5' 11" (1.8 m) | | Winnipeg, Manitoba | Shaftesbury Prep |
| 31 | | Stephanie Maiolo | Freshman | G | 5' 3" (1.6 m) | | Enfield, Connecticut | New England Jr. Falcons |
| 41 | | Annie Belanger | Junior | G | 5' 9" (1.75 m) | | Sherbrooke, Quebec | Team Quebec U18 |
| 44 | | Tristyn Svetek | Freshman | D | 5' 6" (1.68 m) | | Burlington, Ontario | Nepean Jr. Wildcats |
| 47 | | Jaime Fox | Sophomore | D | 5' 10" (1.78 m) | | Unionville, Ontario | Unionville HS |
| 61 | | Briana Colangelo | Freshman | F | 5' 8" (1.73 m) | | Whitby, Ontario | Whitby Jr. Wolves |
| 74 | | Emily Reid | Freshman | D | 5' 8" (1.73 m) | | Whitby, Ontario | Whitby Jr. Wolves |
| 91 | | Madison Badeau | Junior | F | 6' 0" (1.83 m) | | Courtice, Ontario | Jr. Wolves Intermediate |
| 97 | | Catherine Crawley | Freshman | F | 5' 3" (1.6 m) | | Washingtonville, New York | Mid-Fairfield Stars |

== Schedule ==
| Date | Opponent^{#} | Rank^{#} | Site | Decision | Result | Record |
Regular Season
| September 30 | at Union* | | Achilles Center • Schenectady, NY | Annie Belanger | W 5–1 | 1–0–0 |
| October 1 | at Union* | | Achilles Center • Schenectady, NY | Annie Belanger | W 2–1 | 2–0–0 |
| October 7 | #3 Quinnipiac* | | Freitas Ice Forum • Storrs, CT | Annie Belanger | L 0–3 | 2–1–0 |
| October 14 | at Rensselaer* | | Houston Field House • Troy, NY | Annie Belanger | L 0–3 | 2–2–0 |
| October 15 | at Rensselaer* | | Houston Field House • Troy, NY | Morgan Fisher | W 4–1 | 3–2–0 |
| October 21 | Penn State* | | Freitas Ice Forum • Storrs, CT | Annie Belanger | T 0–0 ^{OT} | 3–2–1 |
| October 22 | Penn State* | | Freitas Ice Forum • Storrs, CT | Morgan Fisher | W 4–2 | 4–2–1 |
| October 28 | #4 Boston College | | Freitas Ice Forum • Storrs, CT | Annie Belanger | L 0–3 | 4–3–1 (0–1–0) |
| October 29 | at #4 Boston College | | Kelley Rink • Chestnut Hill, MA | Annie Belanger | L 1–5 | 4–4–1 (0–2–0) |
| November 5 | at Merrimack | | Volpe Complex • North Andover, MA | Annie Belanger | W 7–1 | 5–4–1 (1–2–0) |
| November 6 | at New Hampshire | | Whittemore Center • Durham, NH | Annie Belanger | W 2–1 ^{OT} | 6–4–1 (2–2–0) |
| November 8 | at Brown* | | Meehan Auditorium • Providence, RI | Morgan Fisher | W 3–1 | 7–4–1 |
| November 18 | Maine | | Freitas Ice Forum • Storrs, CT | Annie Belanger | W 5–3 | 8–4–1 (3–2–0) |
| November 20 | at Vermont | | Gutterson Fieldhouse • Burlington, VT | Annie Belanger | T 1–1 ^{OT} | 8–4–2 (3–2–1) |
| November 25 | vs. Yale* | | High Point Solutions Arena • Hamden, CT (Nutmeg Classic, Opening Round) | Annie Belanger | T 1–1 ^{OT} | 8–4–3 |
| November 26 | at #8 Quinnipiac* | | High Point Solutions Arena • Hamden, CT (Nutmeg Classic, Consolation Game) | Annie Belanger | L 2–3 | 8–5–3 |
| December 2 | Boston University | | Freitas Ice Forum • Storrs, CT | Annie Belanger | L 1–4 | 8–6–3 (3–3–1) |
| December 3 | at Boston University | | Walter Brown Arena • Boston, MA | Annie Belanger | W 2–1 | 9–6–3 (4–3–1) |
| January 2, 2017 | Northeastern | | Freitas Ice Forum • Storrs, CT | Annie Belanger | L 2–4 | 9–7–3 (4–4–1) |
| January 6 | Merrimack | | Freitas Ice Forum • Storrs, CT | Annie Belanger | W 3–2 | 10–7–3 (5–4–1) |
| January 7 | at Merrimack | | Volpe Complex • North Andover, MA | Morgan Fisher | L 2–3 | 10–8–3 (5–5–1) |
| January 10 | Boston University | | Freitas Ice Forum • Storrs, CT | Annie Belanger | W 2–1 | 11–8–3 (6–5–1) |
| January 14 | Providence | | Freitas Ice Forum • Storrs, CT | Annie Belanger | L 2–5 | 11–9–3 (6–6–1) |
| January 15 | at Providence | | Schneider Arena • Providence, RI | Morgan Fisher | L 1–4 | 11–10–3 (6–7–1) |
| January 20 | Northeastern | | Freitas Ice Forum • Storrs, CT | Annie Belanger | L 2–3 | 11–11–3 (6–8–1) |
| January 21 | at Northeastern | | Matthews Arena • Boston, MA | Annie Belanger | L 3–5 | 11–12–3 (6–9–1) |
| January 27 | Vermont | | Freitas Ice Forum • Storrs, CT | Annie Belanger | L 2–4 | 11–13–3 (6–10–1) |
| January 28 | Vermont | | Freitas Ice Forum • Storrs, CT | Annie Belanger | W 2–1 | 12–13–3 (7–10–1) |
| February 3 | at #6 Boston College | | Kelley Rink • Chestnut Hill, MA | Annie Belanger | T 4–4 ^{OT} | 12–13–4 (7–10–2) |
| February 5 | at Providence | | Schneider Arena • Providence, RI | Annie Belanger | W 2–1 | 13–13–4 (8–10–2) |
| February 10 | at Maine | | Alfond Arena • Orono, ME | Annie Belanger | W 2–1 | 14–13–4 (9–10–2) |
| February 11 | at Maine | | Alfond Arena • Orono, ME | Annie Belanger | L 0–1 | 14–14–4 (9–11–2) |
| February 17 | New Hampshire | | Freitas Ice Forum • Storrs, CT | Annie Belanger | L 1–4 | 14–15–4 (9–12–2) |
| February 18 | New Hampshire | | Freitas Ice Forum • Storrs, CT | Annie Belanger | L 1–4 | 14–16–4 (9–13–2) |
WHEA Tournament
| February 24 | at Northeastern* | | Matthews Arena • Boston, MA (Quarterfinals, Game 1) | Annie Belanger | L 2–6 | 14–17–4 |
| February 25 | at Northeastern* | | Matthews Arena • Boston, MA (Quarterfinals, Game 2) | Annie Belanger | L 2–3 ^{OT} | 14–18–4 |
*Non-conference game. ^{#}Rankings from USCHO.com Poll.

== Sources ==
- 2016-17 UConn Women's Ice Hockey Media Guide (PDF). Storrs, CT: University of Connecticut. 2016. Archived from the original (PDF) on February 25, 2017.
