= 2016–17 Boston University Terriers women's ice hockey season =

- Conference: 3rd WHEA
- Home ice: Walter Brown Arena

Record
- Overall: 19–11–6
- Home: 13–4–2
- Road: 6–6–3
- Neutral: 0–1–1

Coaches and captains
- Head coach: Brian Durocher
- Assistant coaches: Katie Lachapelle; Allison Coomey
- Captain(s): Alexis Crossley; Natalie Flynn

The Boston University Terriers represented Boston University in Women's Hockey East Association during the 2016–17 NCAA Division I women's ice hockey season.

== Offseason ==
- April 20: Victoria Bach, Rebecca Leslie and Savannah Newton were invited to the Hockey Canada Strength and Conditioning camp.

=== Recruiting ===
Player	Position	Nationality	Notes
Alexandra Calderone	Defender	Canada	Joined 3 current BU players at Hockey Canada Strength and Conditioning Camp
Abby Cook	Defense	Canada	Attended Pursuit of Excellence Academy
Deziray DeSousa	Forward	Canada	Played for Team Quebec
Nina Rodgers	Forward	United States	Transfer from the University of Minnesota
Breanna Scarpaci	Defender	United States	Attended Shattuck-St. Mary's Academy
Katie Shannahan	Defender	United States	Member of Detroit Little Caesars team
Natasza Tarnowski	Forward	Canada	Played for Canada in 2015 Series with USA

== Roster ==
=== 2016-17 Terriers ===
No.	Nat.	Player	Class	Pos	Height	DoB	Hometown	Previous team
1		Ashlyn Aiello	Junior	G	5' 0" (1.52 m)		Belmont, Massachusetts	Phillips Academy
4		Sarah Steele	Senior	D	5' 6" (1.68 m)		Stratford, Prince Edward Island	Appleby College
8		Deziray Desousa	Freshman	F	5' 8" (1.73 m)		Montreal, Quebec	Phillips Exeter
9		Abby Cook	Freshman	D	5' 10" (1.78 m)		Kelowna, British Columbia	Pursuit of Excellence
10		Katie Shannahan	Freshman	D	5' 7" (1.7 m)		Colorado Springs, Colorado	Detroit Little Caesars
11		Alexandra Calderone	Freshman	D	5' 4" (1.63 m)		Kirkland, Quebec	Team Quebec
12		Victoria Bach	Junior	F	5' 4" (1.63 m)		Milton, Ontario	Mississauga Jr. Chiefs
13		Natasza Tarnowski	Freshman	F	5' 4" (1.63 m)		Embrun, Ontario	Ottawa Jr. Senators
14		Maddie Elia	Senior	F	5' 10" (1.78 m)		Lewiston, New York	Nichols School
15		Mary Parker	Graduate	F	5' 9" (1.75 m)		Milton, Massachusetts	Harvard
16		Sammy Davis	Sophomore	F	5' 4" (1.63 m)		Pembroke, Massachusetts	Tabor Academy
17		Breanna Scarpaci	Freshman	D	5' 5" (1.65 m)		Washington, Michigan	Shattuck St. Mary's
19		Rebecca Leslie	Junior	F	5' 6" (1.68 m)		Ottawa, Ontario	Ottawa Senators (PWHL)
20		Samantha Sutherland	Senior	F	5' 4" (1.63 m)		Cochrane, Alberta	Warner School
21		Natalie Flynn (C)	Senior	F	5' 7" (1.7 m)		Medford, Massachusetts	Cushing Academy
22		Anna Streifel	Sophomore (RS)	F	5' 10" (1.78 m)		Bowie, Maryland	Washington Pride
23		Nina Rodgers	Junior	F	5' 5" (1.65 m)		Minnetonka, Minnesota	Minnesota
24		Mary Grace Kelley	Sophomore	F	5' 5" (1.65 m)		Natick, Massachusetts	Dexter Southfield
25		Alexis Crossley (C)	Senior	D	5' 8" (1.73 m)		Cole Harbour, Nova Scotia	New Hampshire
26		Connor Galway	Sophomore	D	5' 10" (1.78 m)		Athens, Ontario	Toronto Aeros
28		Savannah Newton	Junior	D	5' 4" (1.63 m)		Halifax, Nova Scotia	Appleby College
31		Erin O'Neil	Junior	G	5' 7" (1.7 m)		Minnetonka, Minnesota	Hopkins High School
33		Victoria Hanson	Senior	G	5' 9" (1.75 m)		Stoughton, Massachusetts	Lawrence Academy

== Schedule ==
Date	Opponent^{#}	Rank^{#}	Site	Decision	Result	Record
Regular Season
September 25	Providence	#10	Walter Brown Arena • Boston, MA	Victoria Hanson	W 5–2	1–0–0 (1–0–0)
October 7	New Hampshire	#9	Walter Brown Arena • Boston, MA	Erin O'Neil	W 5–1	2–0–0 (2–0–0)
October 9	at Vermont	#9	Gutterson Fieldhouse • Burlington, VT	Victoria Hanson	L 2–3	2–1–0 (2–1–0)
October 14	at Penn State*		Pegula Ice Arena • University Park, PA	Erin O'Neil	T 3–3 ^{OT}	2–1–1
October 15	at Penn State*		Pegula Ice Arena • University Park, PA	Victoria Hanson	W 7–2	3–1–1
October 18	at Northeastern		Matthews Arena • Boston, MA	Erin O'Neil	L 2–6	3–2–1 (2–2–0)
October 25	Northeastern		Walter Brown Arena • Boston, MA	Victoria Hanson	L 3–4	3–3–1 (2–3–0)
November 4	at #4 Boston College		Kelley Rink • Chestnut Hill, MA	Erin O'Neil	L 3–5	3–4–1 (2–4–0)
November 5	#4 Boston College		Walter Brown Arena • Boston, MA	Erin O'Neil	W 5–3	4–4–1 (3–4–0)
November 11	at Maine		Alfond Arena • Orono, ME	Erin O'Neil	W 5–3	5–4–1 (4–4–0)
November 12	at Maine		Alfond Arena • Orono, ME	Erin O'Neil	L 1–4	5–5–1 (4–5–0)
November 18	at Merrimack		Volpe Complex • North Andover, MA	Victoria Hanson	W 7–3	6–5–1 (5–5–0)
November 19	Merrimack		Agganis Arena • Boston, MA	Victoria Hanson	W 2–0	7–5–1 (6–5–0)
November 22	at Harvard*		Bright-Landry Hockey Center • Allston, MA	Victoria Hanson	W 4–3 ^{OT}	8–5–1
November 25	Princeton*		Walter Brown Arena • Boston, MA	Victoria Hanson	W 4–1	9–5–1
November 26	Princeton*		Walter Brown Arena • Boston, MA	Victoria Hanson	W 4–3 ^{OT}	10–5–1
December 2	at Connecticut		Freitas Ice Forum • Storrs, CT	Victoria Hanson	W 4–1	11–5–1 (7–5–0)
December 3	Connecticut		Walter Brown Arena • Boston, MA	Victoria Hanson	L 1–2	11–6–1 (7–6–0)
December 9	#2 Minnesota*		Walter Brown Arena • Boston, MA	Victoria Hanson	L 1–5	11–7–1
December 10	#2 Minnesota*		Walter Brown Arena • Boston, MA	Erin O'Neil	W 6–5 ^{OT}	12–7–1
January 7, 2017	at #6 Boston College		Kelley Rink • Chestnut Hill, MA	Victoria Hanson	T 1–1 ^{OT}	12–7–2 (7–6–1)
January 10	at Connecticut	#10	Freitas Ice Forum • Storrs, CT	Victoria Hanson	L 1–2	12–8–2 (7–7–1)
January 14	Vermont	#10	Walter Brown Arena • Boston, MA	Victoria Hanson	T 3–3 ^{OT}	12–8–3 (7–7–2)
January 15	Vermont	#10	Walter Brown Arena • Boston, MA	Victoria Hanson	T 1–1 ^{OT}	12–8–4 (7–7–3)
January 21	at Providence		Schneider Arena • Providence, RI	Victoria Hanson	T 5–5 ^{OT}	12–8–5 (7–7–4)
January 22	Providence		Walter Brown Arena • Boston, MA	Victoria Hanson	W 5–2	13–8–5 (8–7–4)
January 28	at Merrimack		Volpe Complex • North Andover, MA	Victoria Hanson	L 1–4	13–9–5 (8–8–4)
January 31	vs. #6 Boston College*		Matthews Arena • Boston, MA (Beanpot, Opening Game)	Victoria Hanson	L 2–3	13–10–5
February 7	vs. Harvard*		Matthews Arena • Boston, MA (Beanpot, Consolation Game)	Victoria Hanson	T 6–6 ^{OT}	13–10–6
February 10	at New Hampshire		Whittemore Center • Durham, NH	Victoria Hanson	W 4–3	14–10–6 (9–8–4)
February 11	New Hampshire		Walter Brown Arena • Boston, MA	Victoria Hanson	W 5–2	15–10–6 (10–8–4)
February 17	Northeastern		Walter Brown Arena • Boston, MA	Victoria Hanson	W 7–2	16–10–6 (11–8–4)
February 19	Maine		Walter Brown Arena • Boston, MA	Victoria Hanson	W 5–0	17–10–6 (12–8–4)
WHEA Tournament
February 24	New Hampshire*		Walter Brown Arena • Boston, MA (Quarterfinals, Game 1)	Victoria Hanson	L 2–4	17–11–6
February 25	New Hampshire*		Walter Brown Arena • Boston, MA (Quarterfinals, Game 2)	Victoria Hanson	W 4–3	18–11–6
February 26	New Hampshire*		Walter Brown Arena • Boston, MA (Quarterfinals, Game 3)	Victoria Hanson	W 3–2	19–11–6
March 4	Northeastern*		Walter Brown Arena • Boston, MA (Semifinal Game)	Victoria Hanson	L 1–2	19–12–6
*Non-conference game. ^{#}Rankings from USCHO.com Poll.

== Awards and honors ==
- Mary Parker was named the WHEA Player of the Month for November, 2016.
- Abby Cook (Defender) was named to the WHEA Pro Ambitions All-Rookie Team.
- Victoria Bach (Forward) was named to the WHEA First Team All-Stars.
- Victoria Hanson (Goaltender) was named to the WHEA First Team All-Stars.
- Mary Parker (Forward) was named to the WHEA Second Team All-Stars.
