= 2016–17 Boston College Eagles women's ice hockey season =

Beanpot champions WHEA regular-season champions WHEA tournament champions Frozen Four, Lost to Wisconsin in semifinal 0–1
- Conference: 1st WHEA
- Home ice: Kelley Rink

Rankings
- USA Today/USA Hockey Magazine: 4th
- USCHO.com: 4th

Record
- Overall: 28–6–5
- Home: 14–1–3
- Road: 11–4–2
- Neutral: 3–1–0

Coaches and captains
- Head coach: Katie King-Crowley
- Assistant coaches: Courtney Kennedy; Gillian Apps
- Captain: Andie Anastos
- Alternate captain(s): Krystin Capizzano; Megan Keller

The Boston College Eagles represented Boston College in Women's Hockey East Association play during the 2016–17 NCAA Division I women's ice hockey season.

== Offseason ==
- July 29: Six current members of the Eagles roster were invited to participate at the 2016 USA Hockey Women’s National Festival in Lake Placid, New York: Grace Bizal (D), Katie Burt (G), Kali Flanagan (D), Megan Keller (D), Caitrin Lonergan (F) and Makenna Newkirk (F).
- July 20: Krystin Capizzano was invited to participate at the 2016 Team Canada Camp, held in Calgary, Alberta.

=== Recruiting ===
Player	Position	Nationality	Notes
Kate Annese	Forward	United States	Played with the Mid-Fairfield Connecticut Stars
Molly Barrow	Goaltender	United States	Member of the East Coast Wizards
Delaney Belinskas	Forward	United States	A Florida native; Played for the Mass. Spitfires
Caitrin Lonergan	Forward	United States	Teammate of Kate Annese on Mid-Fairfield Connecticut Stars
Bridget McCarthy	Forward	United States	Played with Delaney Belinskas on Mass. Spitfires
Rachel Moore	Forward	United States	Played with Bay State Breakers
Caroline Ross	Defender	United States	Attended North American Hockey Academy

== Roster ==
=== 2016–17 Eagles ===
No.	Nat.	Player	Class	Pos	Height	DoB	Hometown	Previous team
1		Molly Barrow	Freshman	G	5' 8" (1.73 m)		Belmont, Massachusetts	East Coast Wizards
2		Grace Bizal	Sophomore	D	5' 5" (1.65 m)		Minnetonka, Minnesota	Minnesota Jr. Whitecaps
3		Serena Somerfield	Sophomore	D	5' 9" (1.75 m)		Greenwich, Connecticut	Mid Fairfield CT Stars
4		Megan Keller (A)	Junior	D	5' 11" (1.8 m)		Farmington Hills, Michigan	Honeybaked U19
7		Kristyn Capizzano (A)	Senior	F	5' 2" (1.57 m)		Oakville, Ontario	Mississauga Jr. Chiefs
8		Rachel Moore	Freshman	F	5' 9" (1.75 m)		Falmouth, Massachusetts	Bay State Breakers
10		Kali Flanagan	Junior	D	5' 5" (1.65 m)		Burlington, Massachusetts	National Sports Academy
11		Caitrin Lonergan	Freshman	F	5' 7" (1.7 m)		Roslindale, Massachusetts	Mid-Fairfield Connecticut Stars
12		Kenzie Kent	Junior	F	5' 6" (1.68 m)		Norwell, Massachusetts	Noble and Greenough
13		Haley McLain	Senior	F	5' 1" (1.55 m)		Howell, Michigan	Honeybaked U19
14		Molly Slowe	Sophomore	F	5' 6" (1.68 m)		Medfield, Massachusetts	Assabet Valley U19
15		Erin Connolly	Freshman (RS)	F/D	5' 7" (1.7 m)		South Boston, Massachusetts	Assabet Valley U19
17		Delaney Belinskas	Freshman	F	5' 8" (1.73 m)		Port Orange, Florida	Mass. Spitfires
19		Makenna Newkirk	Sophomore	F	5' 7" (1.7 m)		Scottsdale, Arizona	Southern CT Stars U19
20		Ryan Little	Sophomore	F	5' 7" (1.7 m)		Guilford, Vermont	Shattuck-St. Mary's
21		Bridget McCarthy	Freshman	F	5' 6" (1.68 m)		Pembroke, Massachusetts	Mass. Spitfires
23		Andie Anastos (C)	Senior	F	5' 8" (1.73 m)		Farmington Hills, Michigan	Honeybaked U19
24		Kate Annese	Freshman	F	5' 6" (1.68 m)		Needham, Massachusetts	Mid-Fairfield Connecticut Stars
25		Caroline Ross	Freshman	D	5' 7" (1.7 m)		Rochester, New York	North American Hockey Academy
28		Kathleen McNamara	Sophomore	D	5' 7" (1.7 m)		Montville, New Jersey	New Jersey Rockets U19
32		Gabri Switaj	Junior	G	5' 3" (1.6 m)		Kent, Ohio	Culver Academy
33		Katie Burt	Junior	G	5' 6" (1.68 m)		Lynn, Massachusetts	Buckingham, Brown and Nichols

== Schedule ==
Date	Opponent^{#}	Rank^{#}	Site	Decision	Result	Record
Regular Season
September 30	at Minnesota-Duluth*	#3	Amsoil Arena • Duluth, MN	Katie Burt	T 3–3 ^{OT}	0–0–1
October 1	at Minnesota-Duluth*	#3	Amsoil Arena • Duluth, MN	Katie Burt	L 2–5	0–1–1
October 8	Maine	#5	Kelley Rink • Chestnut Hill, MA	Katie Burt	W 2–1	1–1–1 (1–0–0)
October 9	Maine	#5	Kelley Rink • Chestnut Hill, MA	Katie Burt	W 5–1	2–1–1 (2–0–0)
October 14	at New Hampshire	#5	Whittemore Center • Durham, NH	Katie Burt	W 4–1	3–1–1 (3–0–0)
October 15	at Maine	#5	Norway Savings Bank Arena • Auburn, ME	Katie Burt	L 2–3	3–2–1 (3–1–0)
October 21	Quinnipiac*	#6	Kelley Rink • Chestnut Hill, MA	Katie Burt	T 0–0 ^{OT}	3–2–2
October 22	at Quinnipiac*	#6	High Point Solutiona Arena • Hamden, CT	Katie Burt	W 4–1	4–2–2
October 28	at Connecticut	#4	Freitas Ice Forum • Storrs, CT	Katie Burt	W 3–0	5–2–2 (4–1–0)
October 29	Connecticut	#4	Kelley Rink • Chestnut Hill, MA	Gabri Switaj	W 5–1	6–2–2 (5–1–0)
November 4	Boston University	#4	Kelley Rink • Chestnut Hill, MA	Katie Burt	W 5–3	7–2–2 (6–1–0)
November 5	at Boston University	#4	Walter Brown Arena • Boston, MA	Katie Burt	L 3–5	7–3–2 (6–2–0)
November 11	at New Hampshire	#6	Whittemore Center • Durham, NH	Katie Burt	W 5–1	8–3–2 (7–2–0)
November 12	New Hampshire	#6	Kelley Rink • Chestnut Hill, MA	Gabri Switaj	W 7–1	9–3–2 (8–2–0)
November 20	at Northeastern	#6	Matthews Arena • Boston, MA	Katie Burt	T 2–2 ^{OT}	9–3–3 (8–2–1)
November 26	at Northeastern	#6	Matthews Arena • Boston, MA	Katie Burt	W 4–2	10–3–3 (9–2–1)
December 3	at Providence	#6	Schneider Arena • Providence, RI	Katie Burt	W 8–0	11–3–3 (10–2–1)
December 7	at Dartmouth*	#6	Thompson Arena • Hanover, NH	Katie Burt	W 6–1	12–3–3
January 4, 2017	Syracuse*	#6	Kelley Rink • Chestnut Hill, MA	Katie Burt	W 4–3	13–3–3
January 7	Boston University	#6	Kelley Rink • Chestnut Hill, MA	Katie Burt	T 1–1 ^{OT}	13–3–4 (10–2–2)
January 10	vs. Harvard*	#6	Fenway Park • Boston, MA (Frozen Fenway)	Katie Burt	W 3–1	14–3–4
January 13	Merrimack	#6	Kelley Rink • Chestnut Hill, MA	Katie Burt	W 1–0	15–3–4 (11–2–2)
January 14	at Merrimack	#6	Volpe Complex • North Andover, MA	Katie Burt	W 3–1	16–3–4 (12–2–2)
January 20	at Vermont	#6	Gutterson Fieldhouse • Burlington, VT	Katie Burt	W 3–2 ^{OT}	17–3–4 (13–2–2)
January 21	at Vermont	#6	Gutterson Fieldhouse • Burlington, VT	Katie Burt	W 3–0	18–3–4 (14–2–2)
January 25	Merrimack	#6	Kelley Rink • Chestnut Hill, MA	Katie Burt	W 4–1	19–3–4 (15–2–2)
January 31	vs. Boston University*	#6	Matthews Arena • Boston, MA (Beanpot, opening round)	Katie Burt	W 3–2	20–3–4
February 3	Connecticut	#6	Kelley Rink • Chestnut Hill, MA	Katie Burt	T 4–4 ^{OT}	20–3–5 (15–2–3)
February 7	at Northeastern*	#6	Matthews Arena • Boston, MA (Beanpot championship)	Katie Burt	W 2–1	21–3–5
February 10	Northeastern	#6	Kelley Rink • Chestnut Hill, MA	Katie Burt	L 1–2	21–4–5 (15–3–3)
February 12	Vermont	#6	Kelley Rink • Chestnut Hill, MA	Katie Burt	W 7–1	22–4–5 (16–3–3)
February 18	at Providence	#6	Schneider Arena • Providence, RI	Katie Burt	L 1–4	22–5–5 (16–4–3)
February 18	Providence	#6	Kelley Rink • Chestnut Hill, MA	Katie Burt	W 3–1	23–5–5 (17–4–3)
WHEA Tournament
February 23	Merrimack*	#6	Kelley Rink • Chestnut Hill, MA (Quarterfinals, game 1)	Katie Burt	W 4–0	24–5–5
February 24	Merrimack*	#6	Kelley Rink • Chestnut Hill, MA (Quarterfinals, game 2)	Katie Burt	W 1–0	25–5–5
March 4	vs. Vermont*	#6	Walter Brown Arena • Boston, MA (Semifinal game)	Katie Burt	W 4–3 ^{2OT}	26–5–5
March 5	vs. Northeastern*	#6	Walter Brown Arena • Boston, MA (Championship game)	Katie Burt	W 2-1 ^{OT}	27–5–5
NCAA Tournament
March 11	#6 St. Lawrence*	#4	Kelley Rink • Chestnut Hill, MA (Quarterfinal game)	Katie Burt	W 6-0	28–5–5
March 17	vs. #1 Wisconsin*	#4	Family Arena • St. Charles, MO (Semifinal game, Frozen Four)	Katie Burt	L 0-1	28–6–5
*Non-conference game. ^{#}Rankings from USCHO.com Poll.

== Awards and honors ==
- Caitrin Lonergan, Hockey East Rookie of the Month, October and November, 2016
- Andie Anastos, Hockey East Player of the Month, December, 2016
- Delaney Belinskas, Hockey East Rookie of the Month, December, 2016
- Makenna Newkirk, Hockey East Co-Player of the Month, January, 2017
- Katie Burt, Hockey East Goaltender of the Month, January and February, 2017
- Megan Keller, Hockey East Player of the Month, February, 2017
- Megan Keller, WHEA Best Defender, WHEA Player of the Year

=== Hockey East All-Stars ===
- Delaney Belinskas (Forward), Hockey East Pro-Ambitions All-Rookie Team
- Caitrin Lonergan (Forward), Hockey East Pro-Ambitions All-Rookie Team
