= 2016–17 Yale Bulldogs women's ice hockey season =

- Conference: 7th ECAC Hockey
- Home ice: Ingalls Rink

Record
- Overall: 10-17-4
- Home: 7-5-2
- Road: 3-11-1
- Neutral: 0-1-1

Coaches and captains
- Head coach: Joakim Flygh
- Assistant coaches: Rob Morgan; Amanda Boulier
- Captain: Krista Yip-Chuk

The Yale Bulldogs represented Yale University in ECAC women's ice hockey during the 2016–17 NCAA Division I women's ice hockey season. The Bulldogs returned to the ECAC Tournament finishing in seventh place.

== Offseason ==
- July 21: Eden Murray was picked to attend the Team Canada Development Camp for a second year. The development camp identifies candidates to play for Team Canada in international tournaments, including the Olympics.

=== Recruiting ===
Player	Position	Nationality	Notes
Laura Anderson	Forward	United States	Played for the Minnesota Elite Team Black
Tera Hofmann	Goaltender	Canada	Selected for Team Ontario U18 team
Kirsten Nergaard	Forward	United States	Selected to each year's Team USA Development Camps 2012-2015
Saroya Tinker	Defense	Canada	Member of Team Canada U18
Sophie Veronneau	Forward	Canada	Played for Ottawa Jr. Lady Senators

== 2015–16 Bulldogs ==
No.	Nat.	Player	Class	Pos	Height	DoB	Hometown	Previous team
2		Kara Drexler	Junior	D	5' 4" (1.63 m)		Manhattan Beach, California	Anaheim Lady Ducks
3		Laura Anderson	Freshman	F	5' 9" (1.75 m)		Lino Lakes, Minnesota	Hill-Murray HS
4		Emily Monaghan	Junior	F	5' 7" (1.7 m)		Calgary, Alberta	Edge School
6		Jordan Chancellor	Sophomore	F	5' 5" (1.65 m)		Ramsey, Minnesota	Minnesota Ice Cats
7		Abby Gahm	Senior	F/D	5' 4" (1.63 m)		Eagle River, Alaska	Brewster Academy
8		Eden Murray	Junior	F	5' 4" (1.63 m)		Medicine Hat, Alberta	Edge School
9		Kate Tewksbury	Freshman	D/F	5' 8" (1.73 m)		New York, New York	Mid Fairfield Connecticut Stars
10		Kirsten Nergaard	Freshman	F	5' 6" (1.68 m)		Stamford, Connecticut	Islanders Hockey Club
14		Mallory Souliotis	Junior	D	5' 5" (1.65 m)		Acton, Massachusetts	Assabet Valley
15		Emma Vlasic	Sophomore	F	5' 5" (1.65 m)		Wilmette, Illinois	Chicago Young Americans
19		Courtney Pensavalle	Junior	F	5' 9" (1.75 m)		Winchester, Massachusetts	Team Pittsburgh
20		Kaitlin Gately	Junior	F	5' 4" (1.63 m)		Hingham, Massachusetts	Assabet Valley
21		Brittany Wheeler	Junior	F	5' 6" (1.68 m)		Maple Grove, Minnesota	Benilde-St. Margaret's
24		Grace Wickens	Junior	D	5' 8" (1.73 m)		Ham Lake, Minnesota	Toronto Jr. Aeros
27		Sophie Veronneau	Freshman	F	5' 6" (1.68 m)		Ottawa, Ontario	Ottawa Lady Senators
29		Hanna Mandl	Senior	G	5' 6" (1.68 m)		Nobleton, Ontario	Brampton Jr. Thunder
31		Tera Hofmann	Freshman	G	5' 6" (1.68 m)		Toronto, Ontario	Team Ontario U18
33		Kyra O'Brien	Sophomore	G	5' 7" (1.7 m)		Burlington, Ontario	Burlington Jr. Barracudas
44		Taylor Marchin	Senior	D	5' 7" (1.7 m)		Algonac, Michigan	Assabet Valley
55		Julia Yetman	Sophomore	D	5' 5" (1.65 m)		Pierrefonds, Quebec	Team Quebec U18
71		Saroya Tinker	Freshman	D	5' 9" (1.75 m)		Oshawa, Ontario	Team Canada U18
88		Phoebe Staenz	Senior	F	5' 4" (1.63 m)		Zürich, Switzerland	Swiss National Team
95		Krista Yip-Chuk (C)	Senior	F	5' 5" (1.65 m)		Whitby, Ontario	Whitby Jr. Wolves

== Schedule ==
Date	Opponent^{#}	Rank^{#}	Site	Decision	Result	Record
Regular Season
October 21	RIT*		Ingalls Rink • New Haven, CT	Hanna Mandl	W 4–1	1–0–0
October 22	RIT*		Ingalls Rink • New Haven, CT	Hanna Mandl	W 8–2	2–0–0
October 28	#5 Quinnipiac		Ingalls Rink • New Haven, CT	Hanna Mandl	L 1–4	2–1–0 (0–1–0)
October 29	#9 Princeton		Ingalls Rink • New Haven, CT	Tera Hofmann	T 1–1 ^{OT}	2–1–1 (0–1–1)
November 4	Rensselaer		Ingalls Rink • New Haven, CT	Tera Hofmann	W 7–2	3–1–1 (1–1–1)
November 5	Union		Ingalls Rink • New Haven, CT	Tera Hofmann	W 5–1	4–1–1 (2–1–1)
November 11	at #5 Colgate		Class of 1965 Arena • Hamilton, NY	Tera Hofmann	L 3–4	4–2–1 (2–2–1)
November 12	at Cornell		Lynah Rink • Ithaca, NY	Tera Hofmann	L 2–4	4–3–1 (2–3–1)
November 18	#4 St. Lawrence		Ingalls Rink • New Haven, CT	Kyra O'Brien	L 0–4	4–4–1 (2–4–1)
November 19	#7 Clarkson		Ingalls Rink • New Haven, CT	Kyra O'Brien	L 1–4	4–5–1 (2–5–1)
November 25	vs. Connecticut*		High Point Solutions Arena • Hamden, CT (Nutmeg Classic, Opening Round)	Tera Hofmann	T 1–1 ^{OT}	4–5–2
November 26	vs. Merrimack*		High Point Solutions Arena • Hamden, CT (Nutmeg Classic, Championship Game)	Tera Hofmann	L 3–4	4–6–2
December 10	New Hampshire*		Ingalls Rink • New Haven, CT	Tera Hofmann	L 3–5	4–7–2
December 30	at Vermont*		Gutterson Fieldhouse • Burlington, VT	Tera Hofmann	T 2–2 ^{OT}	4–7–3
December 31	at Vermont*		Gutterson Fieldhouse • Burlington, VT	Tera Hofmann	L 1–2	4–8–3
January 6, 2017	at Union		Achilles Center • Schenectady, NY	Tera Hofmann	W 2–0	5–8–3 (3–5–1)
January 7	at Rensselaer		Houston Field House • Troy, NY	Tera Hofmann	L 1–2 ^{OT}	5–9–3 (3–6–1)
January 13	at #3 Clarkson		Cheel Arena • Potsdam, NY	Tera Hofmann	L 2–4	5–10–3 (3–7–1)
January 14	at #5 St. Lawrence		Appleton Arena • Canton, NY	Tera Hofmann	L 1–4	5–11–3 (3–8–1)
January 20	Dartmouth		Ingalls Rink • New Haven, CT	Kyra O'Brien	W 3–0	6–11–3 (4–8–1)
January 21	Harvard		Ingalls Rink • New Haven, CT	Tera Hofmann	W 3–2	7–11–3 (5–8–1)
January 27	Brown		Ingalls Rink • New Haven, CT	Kyra O'Brien	W 2–1	8–11–3 (6–8–1)
January 27	at Brown		Meehan Auditorium • Providence, RI	Tera Hofmann	W 4–2	9–11–3 (7–8–1)
February 3	at #9 Princeton		Hobey Baker Memorial Rink • Princeton, NJ	Tera Hofmann	W 3–1	10–11–3 (8–8–1)
February 4	at #10 Quinnipiac		High Point Solutions Arena • Hamden, CT	Tera Hofmann	L 1–4	10–12–3 (8–9–1)
February 10	#7 Cornell		Ingalls Rink • New Haven, CT	Tera Hofmann	T 2–2 ^{OT}	10–12–4 (8–9–2)
February 11	Colgate		Ingalls Rink • New Haven, CT	Tera Hofmann	L 1–3	10–13–4 (8–10–2)
February 17	at Harvard		Bright-Landry Hockey Center • Allston, MA	Tera Hofmann	L 0–5	10–14–4 (8–11–2)
February 18	at Dartmouth		Thompson Arena • Hanover, NH	Hanna Mandl	L 1–4	10–15–4 (8–12–2)
ECAC Tournament
February 24	at #5 St. Lawrence*		Appleton Arena • Canton, NY (Quarterfinals, Game 1)	Tera Hofmann	L 1–4	10–16–4
February 25	at #5 St. Lawrence*		Appleton Arena • Canton, NY (Quarterfinals, Game 2)	Kyra O'Brien	L 0–4	10–17–4
*Non-conference game. ^{#}Rankings from USCHO.com Poll.

== Awards and honors ==
- Phoebe Staenz, ECAC All-Star, Third Team"League Announces Postseason Awards". Eastern Collegiate Athletic Conference. March 3, 2017.
