= 2016–17 Brown Bears women's ice hockey season =

- Conference: 10th ECAC
- Home ice: Meehan Auditorium

Record
- Overall: 7–22–0
- Home: 4–12–0
- Road: 3–10–0

Coaches and captains
- Head coach: Bob Kenneally
- Assistant coaches: Katelyn Parker; Kirsti Hussey
- Captain: Maddie Woo
- Alternate captain(s): Bridget Carey; Sam Donovan

The Brown Bears represented Brown University in ECAC women's ice hockey during the 2016–17 NCAA Division I women's ice hockey season.

== Offseason ==
- July 21: 20 members of the Brown team were named to the ECAC All-Academic Team, the most in the program's history.

== Recruiting ==
Player	Position	Nationality	Notes
Veronica Alois	Forward	United States	Attended Andover High School
Maybelline Beiring	Defense	United States	Played with Lansing Spartans
Hana DeClerck	Forward	United States	Played for Little Caesars
Sena Hanson	Forward	United States	Attended St. Paul Academy
Calla Isaac	Goaltender	Canada	Outstanding Track & Field athlete
Sarah Migliori	Forward	United States	Played with Assabet Valley
Lucinda Quigley	Defense	United States	Member of East Coast Wizards
Alley Rempe	Forward	Canada	Chosen to Team British Columbia U18
Steph Rempe	Defense	Canada	Attended Okanagan Hockey Academy

== Roster ==
No.	Nat.	Player	Class	Pos	Height	DoB	Hometown	Previous team
1		Calla Isaac	Freshman	G	5' 8" (1.73 m)		Sherwood Park, Alberta	Sherwood Park
2		Lucinda Quigley	Freshman	D	5' 3" (1.6 m)		Newton, Massachusetts	East Coast Wizards
3		Katie Lynch	Sophomore	F	5' 7" (1.7 m)		Victoria, Minnesota	Benilde-St. Margaret's
6		Veronica Alois	Freshman	F	5' 4" (1.63 m)		Andover, Massachusetts	East Coast Wizards
7		Erin Conway	Senior	F	5' 2" (1.57 m)		Jackson, Michigan	Choate-Rosemary Hall
9		Jenna Hewitt-Kenda	Sophomore	F	5' 7" (1.7 m)		North Vancouver, British Columbia	Pacific Steelers
11		Samantha Swanstrom	Junior	F	5' 4" (1.63 m)		Ham Lake, Minnesota	Blaine HS
12		Sena Hanson	Freshman	F	5' 9" (1.75 m)		New Brighton, Minnesota	St. Paul Academy
13		Abby Niewchas	Sophomore	F/D	5' 8" (1.73 m)		Cochrane, Alberta	Edge School
14		Sarah Migliori	Freshman	F	5' 5" (1.65 m)		East Greenwich, Rhode Island	Assabet Valley
15		Maddie Woo (C)	Senior	F	5' 7" (1.7 m)		Plymouth, Minnesota	Maple Grove HS
16		Katie Swanstrom	Junior	F	5' 4" (1.63 m)		Ham Lake, Minnesota	Minnesota Jr. Whitecaps
17		Cara Najjar	Sophomore	D	5' 5" (1.65 m)		Stoneham, Massachusetts	Assabet Valley
18		Leah Olson	Sophomore	D	5' 5" (1.65 m)		East Harwich, Massachusetts	Assabet Valley
19		Cynthia Kyin	Junior	D	5' 6" (1.68 m)		Skokie, Illinois	Chicago Mission
24		Hana DeClerck	Freshman	F	5' 4" (1.63 m)		Menlo Park, California	Little Caesars
25		Dara Wais	Junior	F	5' 6" (1.68 m)		Baltimore, Maryland	Washington Pride
27		Catherine LeBouef	Senior	D	5' 6" (1.68 m)		Dieppe, New Brunswick	Brewster Academy
28		Bridget Carey (A)	Sophomore	F	5' 5" (1.65 m)		Weymouth, Massachusetts	Bay State Breakers
30		Julianne Landry	Junior	G	5' 7" (1.7 m)		Hanover, Massachusetts	Assabet Valley
32		Sam Donovan (A)	Junior	F	5' 2" (1.57 m)		New Brighton, Minnesota	Elite Black
33		Monica Elvin	Senior	G	5' 6" (1.68 m)		Oakland, California	Alaska All-Stars
44		Steph Rempe	Freshman	D	6' 0" (1.83 m)		Calgary, Alberta	Okanagan Hockey Academy
47		Alley Rempe	Freshman	F	5' 9" (1.75 m)		Calgary, Alberta	Team British Columbia U18

== Schedule ==
Date	Opponent^{#}	Rank^{#}	Site	Decision	Result	Record
Regular Season
October 21	Sacred Heart*		Meehan Auditorium • Providence, RI	Monica Elvin	W 6–3	1–0–0
October 22	Sacred Heart*		Meehan Auditorium • Providence, RI	Julianne Landry	W 7–0	2–0–0
October 28	#9 Princeton		Meehan Auditorium • Providence, RI	Monica Elvin	L 0–4	2–1–0 (0–1–0)
October 29	#5 Quinnipiac		Meehan Auditorium • Providence, RI	Julianne Landry	L 0–8	2–2–0 (0–2–0)
November 4	Union		Meehan Auditorium • Providence, RI	Monica Elvin	W 3–1	3–2–0 (1–2–0)
November 5	Rensselaer		Meehan Auditorium • Providence, RI	Monica Elvin	L 1–4	3–3–0 (1–3–0)
November 8	Connecticut*		Meehan Auditorium • Providence, RI	Julianne Landry	L 1–3	3–4–0
November 11	at Cornell		Lynah Rink • Ithaca, NY	Monica Elvin	L 0–4	3–5–0 (1–4–0)
November 12	at #5 Colgate		Class of 1965 Arena • Hamilton, NY	Monica Elvin	L 0–3	3–6–0 (1–5–0)
November 18	#7 Clarkson		Meehan Auditorium • Providence, RI	Monica Elvin	L 1–8	3–7–0 (1–6–0)
November 19	#4 St. Lawrence		Meehan Auditorium • Providence, RI	Monica Elvin	L 0–5	3–8–0 (1–7–0)
November 26	Providence*		Meehan Auditorium • Providence, RI (Mayor's Cup)	Calla Isaac	L 3–7	3–9–0
November 29	Merrimack*		Meehan Auditorium • Providence, RI	Julianne Landry	L 2–5	3–10–0
December 30	at #9 Robert Morris*		84 Lumber Arena • Neville Township, PA	Monica Elvin	L 1–5	3–11–0
December 31	at #9 Robert Morris*		84 Lumber Arena • Neville Township, PA	Julianne Landry	L 3–5	3–12–0
January 6, 2017	at Rensselaer		Houston Field House • Troy, NY	Monica Elvin	L 3–4	3–13–0 (1–8–0)
January 7	at Union		Achilles Center • Schenectady, NY	Monica Elvin	W 4–3	4–13–0 (2–8–0)
January 13	at #5 St. Lawrence		Appleton Arena • Canton, NY	Monica Elvin	L 2–7	4–14–0 (2–9–0)
January 14	at #3 Clarkson		Cheel Arena • Potsdam, NY	Julianne Landry	L 1–8	4–15–0 (2–10–0)
January 20	Harvard		Meehan Auditorium • Providence, RI	Monica Elvin	L 1–3	4–16–0 (2–11–0)
January 21	Dartmouth		Meehan Auditorium • Providence, RI	Monica Elvin	W 1–0	5–16–0 (3–11–0)
January 27	at Yale		Ingalls Rink • New Haven, CT	Monica Elvin	L 1–2	5–17–0 (3–12–0)
January 28	Yale		Meehan Auditorium • Providence, RI	Monica Elvin	L 2–4	5–18–0 (3–13–0)
February 3	at #10 Quinnipiac		High Point Solutions Arena • Hamden, CT	Monica Elvin	L 0–9	5–19–0 (3–14–0)
February 4	at #9 Princeton		Hobey Baker Memorial Rink • Princeton, NJ	Monica Elvin	L 1–6	5–20–0 (3–15–0)
February 10	Colgate		Meehan Auditorium • Providence, RI	Monica Elvin	L 3–7	5–21–0 (3–16–0)
February 11	#7 Cornell		Meehan Auditorium • Providence, RI	Monica Elvin	L 1–5	5–22–0 (3–17–0)
February 17	at Dartmouth		Thompson Arena • Hanover, NH	Monica Elvin	W 5–2	6–22–0 (4–17–0)
February 18	at Harvard		Bright-Landry Hockey Center • Allston, MA	Monica Elvin	W 3–1	7–22–0 (5–17–0)
*Non-conference game. ^{#}Rankings from USCHO.com Poll.

== Awards and honors ==
- Monica Elvin, Goaltender, All-Ivy Second Team
