= 2016–17 Merrimack Warriors women's ice hockey season =

Nutmeg Classic Champions
- Conference: 8th WHEA
- Home ice: Volpe Complex

Record
- Overall: 11-22-3
- Home: 5-8-2
- Road: 5-14-1
- Neutral: 1-0-0

Coaches and captains
- Head coach: Erin Hamlen
- Assistant coaches: Brent Hill; Steph Moberg
- Captain(s): Marie Delarbre; Jackie Pieper.
- Alternate captain(s): Paige Sorenson; Dominique Kremer

The Merrimack Warriors represent Merrimack College in the Women's Hockey East Association during the 2016–17 NCAA Division I women's ice hockey season.

== Roster ==
=== 2016–17 Warriors ===
No.	Nat.	Player	Class	Pos	Height	DoB	Hometown	Previous team
1		Léa-Kristine Demers	Freshman	G	5' 11" (1.8 m)		Repentigny, Quebec	College Saint-Jean Vianney
4		Felila Manu	Sophomore	D	5' 6" (1.68 m)		Anchorage, Alaska	Alaska All-Stars U-19
5		Paige Sorensen (A)	Sophomore	D	5' 7" (1.7 m)		Plymouth, Minnesota	Wayzata HS
6		Paige Voight	Sophomore	F	5' 7" (1.7 m)		St. Michael, Minnesota	Cretin-Derham Hall
8		Baye Flanagan	Sophomore	D	5' 7" (1.7 m)		Billerica, Massachusetts	Northern Cyclones
9		Dominique Kremer (A)	Sophomore	F	5' 6" (1.68 m)		West Fargo, North Dakota	Shattuck-St. Mary's
10		Meghan Martin	Sophomore	D	5' 4" (1.63 m)		Newport, Vermont	North American Hockey Academy
11		Jillian Batista	Sophomore (RS)	F	5' 5" (1.65 m)		Tonawanda, New York	Kenmore East HS
12		Emily Volpe	Sophomore	F	5' 6" (1.68 m)		Whitby, Ontario	Whitby Jr. Wolves
13		Mikayla Grant-Mentis	Freshman	F	5' 6" (1.68 m)		Brampton, Ontario	Mississauga Jr. Chiefs
14		Jessica Kuhlman	Sophomore	F	5' 6" (1.68 m)		Severna Park, Maryland	Pittsburgh Penguins Elite
15		Jackie Pieper (C)	Sophomore (RS)	F	5' 7" (1.7 m)		Edina, Minnesota	Edina HS
16		Abby Lafreniere	Freshman	F	5' 3" (1.6 m)		Kirkland Lake, Ontario	Cambridge Rivulettes
17		Jessica Bonfe	Sophomore	F	5' 9" (1.75 m)		Woodbury, Minnesota	Hill-Murray HS
18		Katelyn Rae	Sophomore	F	5' 0" (1.52 m)		Courtice, Ontario	Whitby Wolves
19		Samantha Saulnier	Senior	F	5' 4" (1.63 m)		Somerville, Massachusetts	Southfield School
20		Andrea Olson	Freshman	D	5' 6" (1.68 m)		Stillwater, Minnesota	Minnesota Revolution
21		Annie Boekers	Sophomore	F	5' 1" (1.55 m)		Otsego, Minnesota	Cretin-Derham Hall
22		Marie Delarbre (C)	Senior (RS)	F	5' 7" (1.7 m)		Füssen, Germany	EV Füssen
23		Beatrice Dufour	Sophomore	D	5' 11" (1.8 m)		Sarnia, Ontario	Northern Collegiate Institute
25		Madison Morey	Sophomore	F	5' 8" (1.73 m)		Fairbanks, Alaska	North American Hockey Academy
27		Alison Sexton	Sophomore	F	5' 7" (1.7 m)		Stonewall, Manitoba	North American Hockey Academy
29		Chloe Cook	Freshman	D	5' 5" (1.65 m)		Summerland, British Columbia	Okanagan Hockey Academy
30		Alison Glasel	Freshman	G	5' 6" (1.68 m)		Middleton, Wisconsin	Madison Capitols
34		Samantha Ridgewell	Sophomore	G	5' 9" (1.75 m)		Outlook, Saskatchewan	Notre Dame Jr.
		Maddie Santosuosso		G	4' 10" (1.47 m)		Topsfield, Massachusetts

== Schedule ==
Date	Opponent^{#}	Rank^{#}	Site	Decision	Result	Record
Regular Season
September 30	at St. Cloud State*		Herb Brooks National Hockey Center • St. Cloud, MN	Léa-Kristine Demers	L 2–4	0–1–0
October 1	at St. Cloud State*		Herb Brooks National Hockey Center • St. Cloud, MN	Léa-Kristine Demers	W 4–1	1–1–0
October 7	at #7 Colgate*		Starr Rink • Hamilton, NY	Léa-Kristine Demers	L 3–4	1–2–0
October 8	at #7 Colgate*		Starr Rink • Hamilton, NY	Léa-Kristine Demers	L 0–6	1–3–0
October 14	at Maine		Alfond Arena • Orono, ME	Léa-Kristine Demers	W 5–1	2–3–0 (1–0–0)
October 15	at New Hampshire		Whittemore Center • Durham, NH	Léa-Kristine Demers	L 2–6	2–4–0 (1–1–0)
October 21	Robert Morris*		Volpe Complex • North Andover, MA	Léa-Kristine Demers	W 4–3 ^{OT}	3–4–0
October 22	Robert Morris*		Volpe Complex • North Andover, MA	Samantha Ridgewell	T 3–3 ^{OT}	3–4–1
October 28	at Northeastern		Matthews Arena • Boston, MA	Léa-Kristine Demers	W 3–2	4–4–1 (2–1–0)
October 29	Providence		Volpe Complex • North Andover, MA	Samantha Ridgewell	L 2–6	4–5–1 (2–2–0)
November 5	Connecticut		Volpe Complex • North Andover, MA	Léa-Kristine Demers	L 1–7	4–6–1 (2–3–0)
November 11	Northeastern		Volpe Complex • North Andover, MA	Samantha Ridgewell	L 2–4	4–7–1 (2–4–0)
November 12	at Northeastern		Matthews Arena • Boston, MA	Léa-Kristine Demers	L 2–4	4–8–1 (2–5–0)
November 18	Boston University		Volpe Complex • North Andover, MA	Samantha Ridgewell	L 3–7	4–9–1 (2–6–0)
November 19	at Boston University		Walter Brown Arena • Boston, MA	Léa-Kristine Demers	L 0–2	4–10–1 (2–7–0)
November 25	at #8 Quinnipiac*		TD Bank Sports Center • Hamden, CT (Nutmeg Classic Opening Round)	Samantha Ridgewell	T 1–1 ^{OT}	4–10–2
November 26	vs. Yale*		TD Bank Sports Center • Hamden, CT (Nutmeg Classic Championship)	Léa-Kristine Demers	W 4–3	5–10–2
November 29	at Brown*		Meehan Auditorium • Providence, RI	Samantha Ridgewell	W 5–2	6–10–2
December 2	New Hampshire		Volpe Complex • North Andover, MA	Léa-Kristine Demers	L 2–5	6–11–2 (2–8–0)
December 3	at New Hampshire		Whittemore Center • Durham, NH	Samantha Ridgewell	L 2–4	6–12–2 (2–9–0)
December 9	at Providence		Schneider Arena • Providence, RI	Léa-Kristine Demers	L 3–4	6–13–2 (2–10–0)
January 3, 2017	Vermont		Volpe Complex • North Andover, MA	Samantha Ridgewell	W 2–1 ^{OT}	7–13–2 (3–10–0)
January 6	at Connecticut		Freitas Ice Forum • Storrs, CT	Léa-Kristine Demers	L 2–3	7–14–2 (3–11–0)
January 7	Connecticut		Volpe Complex • North Andover, MA	Samantha Ridgewell	W 3–2	8–14–2 (4–11–0)
January 13	at #6 Boston College		Kelley Rink • Chestnut Hill, MA	Léa-Kristine Demers	L 0–1	8–15–2 (4–12–0)
January 14	Boston College		Volpe Complex • North Andover, MA (6)	Samantha Ridgewell	L 1–3	8–16–2 (4–13–0)
January 20	#8 Quinnipiac*		Volpe Complex • North Andover, MA	Léa-Kristine Demers	T 2–2 ^{OT}	8–16–3
January 25	at #6 Boston College		Kelley Rink • Chestnut Hill, MA	Samantha Ridgewell	L 1–4	8–17–3 (4–14–0)
January 28	Boston University		Volpe Complex • North Andover, MA	Léa-Kristine Demers	W 4–1	9–17–3 (5–14–0)
February 3	Maine		Volpe Complex • North Andover, MA	Léa-Kristine Demers	W 7–2	10–17–3 (6–14–0)
February 4	Maine		Volpe Complex • North Andover, MA	Samantha Ridgewell	L 3–5	10–18–3 (6–15–0)
February 12	Providence		Volpe Complex • North Andover, MA	Léa-Kristine Demers	L 3–4 ^{OT}	10–19–3 (6–16–0)
February 17	at Vermont		Gutterson Field House • Burlington, VT	Léa-Kristine Demers	L 3–4	10–20–3 (6–17–0)
February 18	at Vermont		Gutterson Field House • Burlington, VT	Léa-Kristine Demers	W 3–2	11–20–3 (7–17–0)
WHEA Tournament
February 23	at #6 Boston College*		Kelley Rink • Chestnut Hill, MA (Quarterfinal, Game 1)	Léa-Kristine Demers	L 0–4	11–21–3
February 24	at #6 Boston College*		Kelley Rink • Chestnut Hill, MA (Quarterfinal, Game 2)	Samantha Ridgewell	L 0–1	11–22–3
*Non-conference game. ^{#}Rankings from USCHO.com Poll.

== Awards and honors ==
- Jan. 31: Marie Delarbre was selected for Team Germany and competed in Tomakomai, Japan for Olympic Qualifications from February 9 to February 12. On February 12, Germany lost the final qualifying game to Japan 1-3 in the four nation tournament (Austria, France, Germany and Japan). Delabre scored a goal with 1:06 in regulation against France, forcing overtime, which led to a German victory.
- Feb. 3: Mikyla Grant-Mentis was named the January, 2017 WHEA Rookie of the month
