= 2016–17 Cornell Big Red women's ice hockey season =

- Conference: 3rd ECAC Hockey
- Home ice: Lynah Rink

Rankings
- USA Today/USA Hockey Magazine: 7th
- USCHO.com: 7th

Record
- Overall: 20-9-5
- Home: 14-2-2
- Road: 5-7-3
- Neutral: 1-0-0

Coaches and captains
- Head coach: Doug Derraugh
- Assistant coaches: Edith Racine
- Captain(s): Kaitlin Doering; Micah Hart

The Cornell Big Red represented Cornell University in ECAC women's ice hockey during the 2016–17 NCAA Division I women's ice hockey season.

== Offseason ==
Hannah Bunton, Micah Hart Jaime Bourbonnais and Kristin O'Neill were selected for the Canadian National Development Team.

=== Recruiting ===
| Player | Position | Nationality | Notes |
|---|---|---|---|
| Valerie Audet | Forward | Canada | Member of Team Canada U18 |
| Jaime Bourbonnais | Defense | Canada | Member of Team Canada U18, Team Canada Development Team |
| Amy Curlew | Forward | Canada | Named to Team Newfoundland and Labrador |
| Grace Graham | Forward | Canada | Skated for Team Canada U18 |
| Paige Lewis | Forward | United States | Attended North American Hockey Academy |
| Hanna Mutschelknaus | Forward | United States | Played for St. Louis AAA Blues |
| Kristin O'Neill | Forward | Canada | Member of Team Canada U18 |

== 2016–17 Big Red ==
| No. | Nat. | Player | Class | Pos | Height | DoB | Hometown | Previous team |
|---|---|---|---|---|---|---|---|---|
| 1 | | Marlène Boissonnault | Sophomore | G | 5' 10" (1.78 m) | | Dundee, New Brunswick | Team Canada U18 |
| 2 | | Erin O'Connor | Junior | D | 5' 10" (1.78 m) | | Evanston, Illinois | Chicago Young Americans |
| 5 | | Grace Graham | Freshman | F | 5' 8" (1.73 m) | | Island View, New Brunswick | Team Canada U18 |
| 8 | | Micah Hart (C) | Sophomore | D | 5' 9" (1.75 m) | | Saanichton, British Columbia | Team Canada U18 |
| 9 | | Hannah Bunton | Senior | F | 5' 9" (1.75 m) | | Belleville, Ontario | Team Canada U18 |
| 10 | | Brianna Veerman | Senior | F | 5' 5" (1.65 m) | | Burlington, Ontario | Aurora Jr. Panthers |
| 12 | | Hanna Mutschelknaus | Freshman | F | 5' 6" (1.68 m) | | Brandon, South Dakota | St. Louis AAA Blues |
| 13 | | Valérie Audet | Freshman | F | 5' 4" (1.63 m) | | St. Bruno, Quebec | Team Canada U18 |
| 14 | | Jaime Bourbonnais | Freshman | D | 5' 7" (1.7 m) | | Mississauga, Ontario | Oakville Jr. Hornets |
| 15 | | Pippy Gerace | Sophomore | F | 5' 2" (1.57 m) | | Jamestown, New York | Etobicoke Jr. Dolphins |
| 17 | | Lenka Serdar | Sophomore | F | 5' 8" (1.73 m) | | Lexington, Massachusetts | North American Hockey Academy |
| 18 | | Paige Lewis | Freshman | F | 5' 5" (1.65 m) | | New Canaan, Connecticut | North American Hockey Academy |
| 19 | | Diana Buckley | Sophomore | F | 5' 8" (1.73 m) | | Woodbridge, Virginia | Washindton Pride |
| 20 | | Kristin O'Neill | Freshman | F | 5' 4" (1.63 m) | | Oakville, Ontario | Team Canada U18 |
| 21 | | Amy Curlew | Freshman | F | 5' 3" (1.6 m) | | Goose Bay, Labrador | Oakville Jr. Hornets |
| 23 | | Sydney Smith | Senior | D | 5' 3" (1.6 m) | | Lethbridge, Alberta | Team Canada U18 |
| 24 | | Sarah Knee | Junior | D | 6' 1" (1.85 m) | | Toronto, Ontario | Toronto Jr. Aeros |
| 26 | | Kaitlin Doering (C) | Senior | F | 5' 8" (1.73 m) | | Waterloo, Ontario | Mississauga Jr. Chiefs |
| 31 | | Paula Voorheis | Senior | G | 6' 0" (1.83 m) | | Shanty Bay, Ontario | Aurora Jr. Panthers |

== Schedule ==
| Date | Opponent^{#} | Rank^{#} | Site | Decision | Result | Record |
Regular Season
| October 21 | Mercyhurst* | | Lynah Rink • Ithaca, NY | Paula Voorheis | W 3–1 | 1–0–0 |
| October 22 | Mercyhurst* | | Lynah Rink • Ithaca, NY | Marlène Boissonnault | W 2–1 | 2–0–0 |
| October 28 | at Rensselaer | | Houston Field House • Troy, NY | Paula Voorheis | L 0–1 | 2–1–0 (0–1–0) |
| October 29 | at Union | | Achilles Center • Schenectady, NY | Marlène Boissonnault | W 3–1 | 3–1–0 (1–1–0) |
| November 1 | at #6 Colgate | | Class of 1965 Arena • Hamilton, NY | Paula Voorheis | L 1–2 | 3–2–0 (1–2–0) |
| November 11 | Brown | | Lynah Rink • Ithaca, NY | Marlène Boissonnault | W 4–0 | 4–2–0 (2–2–0) |
| November 12 | Yale | | Lynah Rink • Ithaca, NY | Paula Voorheis | W 4–2 | 5–2–0 (3–2–0) |
| November 18 | at #8 Quinnipiac | | High Point Solutions Arena • Hamden, CT | Marlène Boissonnault | T 3–3 ^{OT} | 5–2–1 (3–2–1) |
| November 19 | at Princeton | | Hobey Baker Memorial Rink • Princeton, NJ | Paula Voorheis | W 2–1 | 6–2–1 (4–2–1) |
| November 25 | at #1 Wisconsin* | | LaBahn Arena • Madison, WI | Paula Voorheis | L 0–3 | 6–3–1 |
| November 26 | at #1 Wisconsin* | | LaBahn Arena • Madison, WI | Marlène Boissonnault | L 2–5 | 6–4–1 |
| December 2 | Harvard | | Lynah Rink • Ithaca, NY | Paula Voorheis | W 3–0 | 7–4–1 (5–2–1) |
| December 3 | Dartmouth | | Lynah Rink • Ithaca, NY | Marlène Boissonnault | W 2–1 | 8–4–1 (6–2–1) |
| January 6, 2017 | Providence* | | Lynah Rink • Ithaca, NY | Paula Voorheis | L 0–2 | 8–5–1 |
| January 7 | Providence* | | Lynah Rink • Ithaca, NY | Marlène Boissonnault | W 5–1 | 9–5–1 |
| January 10 | Syracuse* | | Lynah Rink • Ithaca, NY | Paula Voorheis | W 7–2 | 10–5–1 |
| January 13 | Princeton | | Lynah Rink • Ithaca, NY | Paula Voorheis | T 1–1 ^{OT} | 10–5–2 (6–2–2) |
| January 14 | Quinnipiac | | Lynah Rink • Ithaca, NY | Marlène Boissonnault | W 3–2 ^{OT} | 11–5–2 (7–2–2) |
| January 17 | Colgate | #10 | Lynah Rink • Ithaca, NY | Paula Voorheis | W 2–1 | 12–5–2 (8–2–2) |
| January 20 | at #3 Clarkson | #10 | Cheel Arena • Potsdam, NY | Marlène Boissonnault | W 2–1 | 13–5–2 (9–2–2) |
| January 21 | at #5 St. Lawrence | #10 | Appleton Arena • Canton, NY | Paula Voorheis | L 2–5 | 13–6–2 (9–3–2) |
| January 27 | at Dartmouth | #8 | Thompson Arena • Hanover, NH | Marlène Boissonnault | W 1–0 | 14–6–2 (10–3–2) |
| January 27 | at Harvard | #8 | Bright-Landry Hockey Center • Allston, MA | Paula Voorheis | T 2–2 ^{OT} | 14–6–3 (10–3–3) |
| February 3 | Union | #7 | Lynah Rink • Ithaca, NY | Paula Voorheis | W 5–1 | 15–6–3 (11–3–3) |
| February 4 | Rensselaer | #7 | Lynah Rink • Ithaca, NY | Marlène Boissonnault | W 3–2 | 16–6–3 (12–3–3) |
| February 10 | at Yale | #7 | Ingalls Rink • New Haven, CT | Paula Voorheis | T 2–2 ^{OT} | 16–6–4 (12–3–4) |
| February 11 | at Brown | #7 | Meehan Auditorium • Providence, RI | Marlène Boissonnault | W 5–1 | 17–6–4 (13–3–4) |
| February 17 | #5 St. Lawrence | #7 | Lynah Rink • Ithaca, NY | Marlène Boissonnault | T 2–2 ^{OT} | 17–6–5 (13–3–5) |
| February 18 | #3 Clarkson | #7 | Lynah Rink • Ithaca, NY | Paula Voorheis | L 4–5 ^{OT} | 17–7–5 (13–4–5) |
ECAC Tournament
| February 24 | Colgate* | #7 | Lynah Rink • Ithaca, NY (Quarterfinals, Game 1) | Paula Voorheis | W 2–1 | 18–7–5 |
| February 25 | Colgate* | #7 | Lynah Rink • Ithaca, NY (Quarterfinals, Game 2) | Paula Voorheis | W 1–0 | 19–7–5 |
| March 4 | vs. #4 St. Lawrence* | #7 | Cheel Arena • Potsdam, NY (Semifinal Game) | Paula Voorheis | W 3–1 | 20–7–5 |
| March 5 | at #3 Clarkson* | #7 | Cheel Arena • Potsdam, NY (ECAC Championship Game) | Paula Voorheis | L 0–1 | 20–8–5 |
NCAA Tournament
| March 11 | at #3 Clarkson* | #7 | Cheel Arena • Potsdam, NY (Quarterfinal Game) | Paula Voorheis | L 1–3 | 20–9–5 |
*Non-conference game. ^{#}Rankings from USCHO.com Poll.

== Awards and honors ==
- Doug Derraugh, ECAC Coach of the Year
- Paula Voorheis, Mandi Schwartz Student-Athlete of the Year
- Micah Hart, Defense, All-ECAC First Team
- Hannah Bunton, Forward, All-ECAC Third Team
- Jaime Bourbonnais, Defense, All-ECAC Rookie Team, USCHO Rookie team
- Kristin O'Neill, Forward, All-ECAC Rookie Team
