= 2016–17 Maine Black Bears women's ice hockey season =

- Conference: 9th WHEA
- Home ice: Alfond Arena

Record
- Overall: 10-21-1
- Home: 9-8-1
- Road: 1-13-0
- Neutral: 0-0-0

Coaches and captains
- Head coach: Richard Reichenbach
- Assistant coaches: Sara Reichenbach; Mike O'Grady; Brooklyn Langlois
- Captain: Emily Brigham
- Alternate captain: Jessica Vallotton

The Maine Black Bears represented the University of Maine in Women's Hockey East Association during the 2016–17 NCAA Division I women's ice hockey season.

== Offseason ==
- June 30: The Maine Black Bears have 21 named to the WHEA All-Academic All-Star Team.

=== Recruiting ===
Player	Position	Nationality	Notes
Jillian Flynn	Goaltender	United States	Presque Isle HS (Male)
Sierra Semmel	Forward	United States	Washington Pride
Brittany Colton	Defense	United States	East Coast Wizards
Kara Washer	Forward	Canada	Barrie Sharks
Ebba Strandberg	Defense	Sweden	Swedish National U-18 Team
Jessica Jacques	Forward	United States	Boston Shamrocks
Vendula Pribylová	Forward	Czech Republic	Czech National Team
Tereza Vanišová	Forward	Czech Republic	Czech National Team

== Roster ==
=== 2016-17 Black Bears ===
se

No.	Nat.	Player	Class	Pos	Height	DoB	Hometown	Previous team
1		Jillian Flynn	Freshman	G	5' 5" (1.65 m)		Presque Isle, Maine	Presque Isle HS
3		Brooke Stacey	Junior	F	5' 10" (1.78 m)		Kahnawake, Quebec	Ontario Hockey Academy
4		Jessica Vallotton (A)	Senior	D	6' 0" (1.83 m)		Glenboro, Manitoba	Westman Wildcats
7		Ebba Strandberg	Freshman	D	6' 1" (1.85 m)		Kalmar, Sweden	Team Sweden U18
7		Alyson Matteau	Sophomore	D	5' 10" (1.78 m)		Mirabel, Quebec	Northwood School
8		Brittany Kucera	Freshman	D	5' 10" (1.78 m)		Toronto, Ontario	Aurora Jr. Panthers
9		Mikayla Rogers	Junior	D	5' 7" (1.7 m)		St. Paul, Minnesota	St. Paul Blades
10		Jessica Jacques	Freshman	F	5' 4" (1.63 m)		North Reading, Massachusetts	Boston Shamrocks
11		Victoria Hummel	Junior	F	5' 3" (1.6 m)		Tulln, Austria	EHV Sabers
12		Emilie Brigham (C)	Senior	F	5' 5" (1.65 m)		Anoka, Minnesota	Anoka High School
13		Cailey Hutchison	Sophomore	F	5' 4" (1.63 m)		Hicksville, New York	Northwood School
15		Catherine Tufts	Junior	F	5' 6" (1.68 m)		Church Point, Nova Scotia	Ontario Hockey Academy
16		Brittany Colton	Freshman	D	5' 6" (1.68 m)		Groton, Massachusetts	East Coast Wizards
17		Lydia Murray	Freshman	F	5' 10" (1.78 m)		Sault Ste. Marie, Ontario	Sault Ste. Marie Wildcats
18		Cassidy Herman	Sophomore	F	5' 6" (1.68 m)		Ottawa, Ontario	Ottawa Jr. Senators
20		Morgan Sakundiak	Senior	F	5' 4" (1.63 m)		Calgary, Alberta	Pursuit of Excellence
21		Tereza Vanišová	Freshman	F	5' 8" (1.73 m)		Strakonice, Czech Republic	Czech National Team
22		Kara Washer	Freshman	F	5' 9" (1.75 m)		New Lowell, Ontario	Barrie Sharks
23		Anna Wright	Senior	D	5' 11" (1.8 m)		North Berwick, Maine	Berwick Academy
25		Nicole Arnold	Sophomore	F	5' 8" (1.73 m)		St. Louis, Missouri	Madison Capitols
26		Sierra Semmel	Freshman	F	5' 3" (1.6 m)		Dedham, Maine	Washington Pride
27		Mariah Fujimagari	Senior	G	5' 10" (1.78 m)		Markham, Ontario	Markham-Stoufville Stars
28		Vendula Pribylová	Freshman	F	5' 7" (1.7 m)		Olomouc, Czech Republic	Czech National Team
29		Kristin Gilmore	Junior	D	5' 10" (1.78 m)		Millgrove, Ontario	Oakville Hornets
31		Carly Jackson	Freshman	G	5' 5" (1.65 m)		Amherst, Nova Scotia	Cumberland County Blues Jr. B

== Schedule ==
Date	Opponent^{#}	Rank^{#}	Site	Decision	Result	Record
Regular Season
September 24	Rensselaer*		Alfond Arena • Orono, ME	Carly Jackson	L 1–3	0–1–0
September 25	Rensselaer*		Alfond Arena • Orono, ME	Mariah Fujimagari	W 2–0	1–1–0
September 30	at Quinnipiac*		TD Bank Sports Center • Hamden, CT	Carly Jackson	L 4–5	1–2–0
October 1	at Quinnipiac*		TD Bank Sports Center • Hamden, CT	Carly Jackson	L 0–3	1–3–0
October 8	at Boston College		Kelley Rink • Chestnut Hill, MA	Carly Jackson	L 1–2	1–4–0 (0–1–0)
October 9	at Boston College		Kelley Rink • Chestnut Hill, MA	Carly Jackson	L 1–5	1–5–0 (0–2–0)
October 14	Merrimack		Alfond Arena • Orono, ME	Mariah Fujimagari	L 1–5	1–6–0 (0–3–0)
October 15	Boston College		Norway Bank Arena • Auburn, ME	Carly Jackson	W 3–2	2–6–0 (1–3–0)
October 28	at Providence		Schneider Arena • Providence, RI	Carly Jackson	L 2–3	2–7–0 (1–4–0)
October 30	Vermont		Alfond Arena • Orono, ME	Carly Jackson	L 2–3	2–8–0 (1–5–0)
November 5	at Northeastern		Matthews Arena • Boston, MA	Carly Jackson	L 2–3	2–9–0 (1–6–0)
November 11	Boston University		Alfond Arena • Orono, ME	Carly Jackson	L 3–5	2–10–0 (1–7–0)
November 12	Boston University		Alfond Arena • Orono, ME	Carly Jackson	W 4–1	3–10–0 (2–7–0)
November 18	at Connecticut		Freitas Ice Forum • Storrs, CT	Carly Jackson	L 3–5	3–11–0 (2–8–0)
November 26	New Hampshire		Norway Bank Arena • Auburn, ME	Carly Jackson	T 2–2 ^{OT}	3–11–1 (2–8–1)
November 28	Dartmouth*		Alfond Arena • Orono, ME	Carly Jackson	L 0–4	3–12–1
November 29	Dartmouth*		Alfond Arena • Orono, ME	Mariah Fujimagari	W 3–2	4–12–1
December 9	Union*		Alfond Arena • Orono, ME	Carly Jackson	W 2–1	5–12–1
December 10	Union*		Alfond Arena • Orono, ME	Carly Jackson	W 3–1	6–12–1
January 7, 2017	at Vermont		Gutterson Fieldhouse • Burlington, VT	Carly Jackson	L 1–4	6–13–1 (2–9–1)
January 8	at Vermont		Gutterson Fieldhouse • Burlington, VT	Carly Jackson	L 1–3	6–14–1 (2–10–1)
January 13	Northeastern		Alfond Arena • Orono, ME	Carly Jackson	W 3–1	7–14–1 (3–10–1)
January 14	Northeastern		Alfond Arena • Orono, ME	Carly Jackson	W 6–3	8–14–1 (4–10–1)
January 20	at New Hampshire		Whittemore Center • Durham, NH	Carly Jackson	L 1–4	8–15–1 (4–11–1)
January 21	at New Hampshire		Whittemore Center • Durham, NH	Carly Jackson	L 0–7	8–16–1 (4–12–1)
January 28	Providence		Alfond Arena • Orono, ME	Carly Jackson	L 4–6	8–17–1 (4–13–1)
January 29	Providence		Alfond Arena • Orono, ME	Mariah Fujimagari	L 2–5	8–18–1 (4–14–1)
February 3	at Merrimack		Volpe Complex • North Andover, MA	Mariah Fujimagari	L 2–7	8–19–1 (4–15–1)
February 4	at Merrimack		Volpe Complex • North Andover, MA	Mariah Fujimagari	W 5–3	9–19–1 (5–15–1)
February 10	Connecticut		Alfond Arena • Orono, ME	Carly Jackson	L 1–2	9–20–1 (5–16–1)
February 11	Connecticut		Alfond Arena • Orono, ME	Carly Jackson	W 1–0	10–20–1 (6–16–1)
February 19	at Boston University		Walter Brown Arena • Boston, MA	Carly Jackson	L 0–5	10–21–1 (6–17–1)
*Non-conference game. ^{#}Rankings from USCHO.com Poll.

== Awards and honors ==
- Tereza Vanišová was selected as WHEA Co-Rookie of the Month for November
- Brooke Stacey, F - WHEA All-Star Honorable Mention
