= 2016–17 Princeton Tigers women's ice hockey season =

- Conference: 4th ECAC Hockey
- Home ice: Hobey Baker Memorial Rink

Rankings
- USA Today/USA Hockey Magazine: 9th
- USCHO.com: 9th

Record
- Overall: 20-10-3
- Home: 11-5-1
- Road: 9-5-2

Coaches and captains
- Head coach: Jeff Kampersal
- Assistant coaches: Cara Morey; Ashley Kilstein
- Captain: Kelsey Koelzer
- Alternate captain(s): Molly Contini; Fiona McKenna

The Princeton Tigers represented Princeton University in ECAC women's ice hockey during the 2016–17 NCAA Division I women's ice hockey season.

== Offseason ==
- August 14: Kelsey Koelzer was named to the Team USA U22 roster, while Stephanie Sucharda and Steph Neatby were named to Team Canada U22.

=== Recruiting ===
Player	Position	Nationality	Notes
Carly Bullock	Forward	United States	Attended Blake School with Sylvie Wallin and Karlie Lund
MacKenzie Ebel	Forward	Canada	Attended Kent School
Julia Edgar	Defense	Canada	Played for Team Canada U18
Steph Neatby	Goaltender	Canada	Netminder for Toronto Jr. Aeros
Claire Thompson	Defense	Canada	Played for Toronto Jr. Aeros
Sylvie Wallin	Defense	United States	Attended Blake School

== 2016–17 Tigers ==
No.	Nat.	Player	Class	Pos	Height	DoB	Hometown	Previous team
2		Molly Strabley	Senior	D	5' 5" (1.65 m)		Yarmouth, Maine	Assabet Valley
4		Claire Thompson	Freshman	D	5' 8" (1.73 m)		Toronto, Ontario	Toronto Jr. Aeros
5		Kimiko Marinacci	Sophomore	D	5' 6" (1.68 m)		Ottawa, Ontario	Ottawa Lady Senators
6		Julia Edgar	Freshman	D	5' 7" (1.7 m)		Oakville, Ontario	Team Canada U18
8		Audrey Potts	Senior	F	5' 6" (1.68 m)		Toronto, Ontario	Toronto Jr. Aeros
9		Molly Contini (A)	Senior	F	5' 8" (1.73 m)		Arthur, Ontario	Kitchener-Waterloo Rangers
10		Cassidy Tucker	Senior	F	5' 8" (1.73 m)		Plymouth, Michigan	Detroit Little Caesars
11		Kelsey Koelzer (C)	Senior	D	5' 9" (1.75 m)		Horsham, Pennsylvania	New Jersey Rockets
12		Morgan Sly	Senior	F	5' 6" (1.68 m)		Collingwood, Ontario	Toronto Jr. Aeros
13		Sylvie Wallin	Freshman	D	5' 10" (1.78 m)		Edina, Minnesota	Blake School
17		Keiko DeClerck	Sophomore	F	5' 5" (1.65 m)		San Jose, California	Team USA Development U19
20		Carly Bullock	Freshman	F	5' 7" (1.7 m)		Eden Prairie, Minnesota	Blake School
21		Karlie Lund	Sophomore	F	5' 10" (1.78 m)		Eden Prairie, Minnesota	Blake School
22		Kiersten Falck	Junior	F	5' 5" (1.65 m)		Ham Lake, Minnesota	Minnesota Jr. Whitecaps
23		Emily Achterkirch	Junior	D	5' 7" (1.7 m)		St. Michael, Minnesota	Minnesota Jr. Whitecaps
24		Fiona McKenna (A)	Senior	F	5' 8" (1.73 m)		Burr Ridge, Illinois	Team USA U18
25		Stephanie Sucharda	Sophomore	D	5' 8" (1.73 m)		Mississauga, Ontario	Mississauga Jr. Chiefs
26		MacKenzie Ebel	Freshman	F	5' 7" (1.7 m)		Airdrie, Alberta	Kent School
31		Alysia Dasilva	Junior	G	5' 7" (1.7 m)		Oakville, Ontario	Mississauga Jr. Chiefs
35		Steph Neatby	Freshman	G	6' 0" (1.83 m)		Toronto, Ontario	Toronto Jr. Aeros

== Schedule ==
Date	Opponent^{#}	Rank^{#}	Site	Decision	Result	Record
Regular Season
October 22	at Providence*		Schneider Arena • Providence, RI	Alysia DaSilva	W 4–2	1–0–0
October 23	at Providence*		Schneider Arena • Providence, RI	Alysia DaSilva	W 7–3	2–0–0
October 28	at Brown	#9	Meehan Auditorium • Providence, RI	Alysia DaSilva	W 4–0	3–0–0 (1–0–0)
October 29	at Yale	#9	Ingalls Rink • New Haven, CT	Alysia DaSilva	T 1–1 ^{OT}	3–0–1 (1–0–1)
November 4	#7 St. Lawrence	#10	Hobey Baker Memorial Rink • Princeton, NJ	Alysia DaSilva	L 1–3	3–1–1 (1–1–1)
November 5	#8 Clarkson	#10	Hobey Baker Memorial Rink • Princeton, NJ	Alysia DaSilva	L 2–4	3–2–1 (1–2–1)
November 5	#8 Clarkson	#10	Hobey Baker Memorial Rink • Princeton, NJ	Alysia DaSilva	L 2–4	3–2–1 (1–2–1)
November 11	at Harvard	#10	Bright-Landry Hockey Center • Allston, MA	Alysia DaSilva	W 2–1 ^{OT}	4–2–1 (2–2–1)
November 12	at Dartmouth	#10	Thompson Arena • Hanover, NH	Alysia DaSilva	L 2–3 ^{OT}	4–3–1 (2–3–1)
November 18	#5 Colgate		Hobey Baker Memorial Rink • Princeton, NJ	Alysia DaSilva	W 7–2	5–3–1 (3–3–1)
November 19	Cornell		Hobey Baker Memorial Rink • Princeton, NJ	Alysia DaSilva	L 1–2	5–4–1 (3–4–1)
November 25	at Boston University*		Walter Brown Arena • Boston, MA	Alysia DaSilva	L 1–4	5–5–1
November 26	at Boston University*		Walter Brown Arena • Boston, MA	Steph Neatby	L 3–4 ^{OT}	5–6–1
December 2	at Rensselaer		Houston Field House • Troy, NY	Steph Neatby	W 4–0	6–6–1 (4–4–1)
December 3	at Union		Achilles Center • Schenectady, NY	Steph Neatby	W 7–0	7–6–1 (5–4–1)
December 10	Mercyhurst*		Hobey Baker Memorial Rink • Princeton, NJ	Steph Neatby	W 4–2	8–6–1
December 11	Mercyhurst*		Hobey Baker Memorial Rink • Princeton, NJ	Steph Neatby	W 5–2	9–6–1
December 31	Penn State*		Hobey Baker Memorial Rink • Princeton, NJ	Alysia DaSilva	T 5–5 ^{OT}	9–6–2
January 1, 2017	#8 Quinnipiac		Hobey Baker Memorial Rink • Princeton, NJ	Steph Neatby	W 2–1	10–6–2 (6–4–1)
January 6	Dartmouth		Hobey Baker Memorial Rink • Princeton, NJ	Steph Neatby	W 4–0	11–6–2 (7–4–1)
January 7	Harvard		Hobey Baker Memorial Rink • Princeton, NJ	Steph Neatby	W 2–1	12–6–2 (8–4–1)
January 13	at Cornell		Lynah Rink • Ithaca, NY	Steph Neatby	T 1–1 ^{OT}	12–6–3 (8–4–2)
January 14	at #9 Colgate		Class of 1965 Arena • Hamilton, NY	Steph Neatby	W 5–1	13–6–3 (9–4–2)
January 31	at #10 Quinnipiac	#9	High Point Solutions Arena • Hamden, CT	Steph Neatby	W 3–0	14–6–3 (10–4–2)
February 3	Yale	#10	Hobey Baker Memorial Rink • Princeton, NJ	Steph Neatby	L 1–3	14–7–3 (10–5–2)
February 4	Brown	#10	Hobey Baker Memorial Rink • Princeton, NJ	Alysia DaSilva	W 6–1	15–7–3 (11–5–2)
February 11	at #4 Clarkson	#10	Cheel Arena • Potsdam, NY	Steph Neatby	L 1–3	15–8–3 (11–6–2)
February 12	at #3 St. Lawrence	#10	Appleton Arena • Canton, NY	Steph Neatby	W 4–2	16–8–3 (12–6–2)
February 17	Union	#9	Hobey Baker Memorial Rink • Princeton, NJ	Alysia DaSilva	W 4–1	17–8–3 (13–6–2)
February 18	Rensselaer	#9	Hobey Baker Memorial Rink • Princeton, NJ	Steph Neatby	W 4–2	18–8–3 (14–6–2)
ECAC Tournament
February 24	#10 Quinnipiac*	#8	Hobey Baker Memorial Rink • Princeton, NJ (Quarterfinals, Game 1)	Steph Neatby	L 2–3 ^{3OT}	18–9–3
February 25	#10 Quinnipiac*	#8	Hobey Baker Memorial Rink • Princeton, NJ (Quarterfinals, Game 2)	Steph Neatby	W 2–0	19–9–3
February 26	#10 Quinnipiac*	#8	Hobey Baker Memorial Rink • Princeton, NJ (Quarterfinals, Game 3)	Steph Neatby	W 2–1	20–9–3
March 4	at #3 Clarkson*	#8	Cheel Arena • Potsdam, NY (Semifinal Game)	Steph Neatby	L 0–4	20–10–3
*Non-conference game. ^{#}Rankings from USCHO.com Poll.

== Awards and honors ==
- Carly Bullock, ECAC Rookie of the Year
- Steph Neatby, ECAC Goaltender of the Year
- Steph Neatby, Goaltender, All-ECAC First Team
- Kelsey Koelzer, Defense, All-ECAC Second Team
- Karlie Lund, Forward, All-ECAC Lund Team
- Carly Bullock, Forward, All-ECAC Rookie Team
- Steph Neatby, Goaltender, All-ECAC Rookie Team
