= 2016–17 Providence Friars women's ice hockey season =

2016 Mayor's Cup Winner
- Conference: 4th (tied) WHEA
- Home ice: Schneider Arena

Record
- Overall: 17-17-3
- Home: 8-10-2
- Road: 9-7-1
- Neutral: 0-0-0

Coaches and captains
- Head coach: Bob Deraney
- Assistant coaches: Melanie Ruzzi; Derek Alfama
- Captain: Cassidy Carels
- Alternate captain(s): Courtney Kukowski, Brittany Thunstrom, Lauren Klein

The Providence Friars represents Providence College in Women's Hockey East Association play during the 2016–17 NCAA Division I women's ice hockey season.

== Offseason ==
- September 24: Christina Putigna wasselected to Team Canada U-22 to participate in a 3-game series against Team USA in Calgary. Head Coach Bob Deraney served as the Team USA Head Coach in the same series.

=== Recruiting ===
Player	Position	Nationality	Notes
Whitney Dove	Defender	Canada	Played for the Pacific Steelers
Avery Fransoo	Defense	Canada	Played with Notre Dame Hounds
Kathleen McHugh	Forward	United States	Member of the Boston Shamrocks
Clare Minnerath	Goaltender	United States	Attended Sartell HS in Minnesota
Meaghan Rickard	Forward	United States	Attended Williston-Northampton
Rachel Rockwell	Defender	United States	Rickards teammate at Williston-Northampton
Neve Van Pelt	Forward	Canada	Played with Toronto Jr. Aeros

== Roster ==
=== 2016–17 Friars ===
No.	Nat.	Player	Class	Pos	Height	DoB	Hometown	Previous team
1		Madison Myers	Sophomore	G	5' 7" (1.7 m)		Colchester, Vermont	Rice Memorial HS
2		Ariana Buxman	Senior	D	5' 6" (1.68 m)		Glenwood Springs, Colorado	Shattuck St. Mary's
4		Blair Parent	Junior	F	5' 5" (1.65 m)		Blaine, Minnesota	Anoka HS
6		Kate Friesen	Sophomore	D	5' 6" (1.68 m)		Altona, Manitoba	Pembina Valley Hawks
7		Whitney Dove	Freshman	D	5' 6" (1.68 m)		Port Moody, British Columbia	Pacific Steelers
8		Kathleen McHugh	Freshman	F	5' 4" (1.63 m)		Billerica, Massachusetts	Boston Shamrocks
9		Meaghan Rickard	Freshman	F	5' 6" (1.68 m)		Coventry, Rhode Island	Williston-Northampton
10		Neve Van Pelt	Freshman	F	5' 6" (1.68 m)		Mitchell, Ontario	Toronto Jr. Aeros
11		Rachel Rockwell	Freshman	D	5' 10" (1.78 m)		Broadview Heights, Ohio	Williston-Northampton
13		Emily Landry	Sophomore	F	5' 8" (1.73 m)		Orangeville, Ontario	Etobicoke Jr. Dolphins
17		Cassidy MacPherson	Sophomore	F	5' 6" (1.68 m)		Oakville, Ontario	Oakville Jr. Hornets
18		Ariana Reed	Senior	D	5' 3" (1.6 m)		Lakeville, Minnesota	Lakeville South HS
19		Brooke Boquist	Junior	F	5' 4" (1.63 m)		Thunder Bay, Ontario	Shattuck-St. Mary's
21		Christina Putigna	Sophomore	F	5' 8" (1.73 m)		Grimsby, Ontario	Oakville Jr. Hornets
22		Kendra Goodrich	Senior	D	5' 9" (1.75 m)		Apple Valley, Minnesota	Rosemount HS
23		Madison Sansone	Junior	F	5' 3" (1.6 m)		Lockport, New York	Buffalo Bisons
24		Lauren Klein (A)	Senior	D	5' 5" (1.65 m)		Shoreview, Minnesota	RIT
26		Danielle Hardy	Sophomore	F	6' 0" (1.83 m)		Nanaimo, British Columbia	Pursuit of Excellence Academy
27		Avery Fransoo	Freshman	D	5' 6" (1.68 m)		North Battleford, Saskatchewan	Notres Dame Hounds
28		Natasia Burzynski	Sophomore	F	5' 4" (1.63 m)		Rye, New Hampshire	East Coast Wizards
29		Cassidy Carels (C)	Senior	F	5' 5" (1.65 m)		Bruxelles, Manitoba	Team Canada U18
31		Clare Minnerath	Freshman	G	5' 5" (1.65 m)		Sartell, Minnesota	Sartell HS
33		Alanna Serviss	Senior	G	5' 7" (1.7 m)		Chicago, Illinois	Chicago Young Americans

== Schedule ==
Date	Opponent^{#}	Rank^{#}	Site	Decision	Result	Record
Regular Season
September 25	at #10 Boston University		Walter Brown Arena • Boston, MA	Madison Myers	L 2–5	0–1–0 (0–1–0)
October 1	Robert Morris*		Schneider Arena • Providence, RI	Madison Myers	L 2–3	0–2–0
October 2	Robert Morris*		Schneider Arena • Providence, RI	Madison Myers	L 2–3	0–3–0
October 7	at RIT*		Gene Polisseni Center • Rochester, NY	Madison Myers	W 7–0	1–3–0
October 8	at RIT*		Gene Polisseni Center • Rochester, NY	Madison Myers	W 3–0	2–3–0
October 18	Union*		Schneider Arena • Providence, RI	Alanna Serviss	W 4–2	3–3–0
October 22	Princeton*		Schneider Arena • Providence, RI	Alanna Serviss	L 2–4	3–4–0
October 23	Princeton*		Schneider Arena • Providence, RI	Alanna Serviss	L 3–7	3–5–0
October 28	Maine		Schneider Arena • Providence, RI	Alanna Serviss	W 3–2	4–5–0 (1–1–0)
October 29	at Merrimack		Volpe Complex • North Andover, MA	Alanna Serviss	W 6–2	5–5–0 (2–1–0)
November 5	New Hampshire		Schneider Arena • Providence, RI	Madison Myers	L 3–4	5–6–0 (2–2–0)
November 6	at Northeastern		Matthews Arena • Boston, MA	Alanna Serviss	L 3–4	5–7–0 (2–3–0)
November 12	Vermont		Schneider Arena • Providence, RI	Alanna Serviss	W 5–2	6–7–0 (3–3–0)
November 13	Vermont		Schneider Arena • Providence, RI	Madison Myers	T 1–1 ^{OT}	6–7–1 (3–3–1)
November 19	New Hampshire		Schneider Arena • Providence, RI	Madison Myers	W 6–3	7–7–1 (4–3–1)
November 20	at New Hampshire		Whittemore Center • New Hampshire, NH	Madison Myers	L 1–2	7–8–1 (4–4–1)
November 26	at Brown*		Meehan Auditorium • Providence, RI (Mayor's Cup)	Madison Myers	W 7–3	8–8–1
November 30	#10 Northeastern		Schneider Arena • Providence, RI	Madison Myers	L 3–5	8–9–1 (4–5–1)
December 3	#6 Boston College		Schneider Arena • Providence, RI	Madison Myers	L 0–8	8–10–1 (4–6–1)
December 9	Merrimack		Schneider Arena • Providence, RI	Madison Myers	W 3–2	9–10–1 (5–6–1)
January 6, 2017	at Cornell*		Lynah Rink • Ithaca, NY	Clare Minnerath	W 2–0	10–10–1
January 7	at Cornell*		Lynah Rink • Ithaca, NY	Madison Myers	L 1–5	10–11–1
January 14	at Connecticut		Freitas Ice Forum • Storrs, CT	Clare Minnerath	W 5–2	11–11–1 (6–6–1)
January 15	Connecticut		Schneider Arena • Providence, RI	Madison Myers	W 4–1	12–11–1 (7–6–1)
January 21	Boston University		Schneider Arena • Providence, RI	Madison Myers	T 5–5 ^{OT}	12–11–2 (7–6–2)
January 22	at Boston University		Walter Brown Arena • Boston, MA	Clare Minnerath	L 2–5	12–12–2 (7–7–2)
January 28	at Maine		Alfond Arena • Orono, ME	Madison Myers	W 6–4	13–12–2 (8–7–2)
January 29	at Maine		Alfond Arena • Orono, ME	Madison Myers	W 5–2	14–12–2 (9–7–2)
February 3	at Northeastern		Matthews Arena • Boston, MA	Madison Myers	L 3–4 ^{OT}	14–13–2 (9–8–2)
February 5	Connecticut		Schneider Arena • Providence, RI	Madison Myers	L 1–2	14–14–2 (9–9–2)
February 10	at Vermont		Gutterson Fieldhouse • Burlington, VT	Madison Myers	T 2–2 ^{OT}	14–14–3 (9–9–3)
February 12	at Merrimack		Volpe Complex • North Andover, MA	Madison Myers	W 4–3 ^{OT}	15–14–3 (10–9–3)
February 18	at #6 Boston College		Schneider Arena • Providence, RI	Madison Myers	W 4–1	16–14–3 (11–9–3)
February 19	at #6 Boston College		Kelley Rink • Chestnut Hill, MA	Madison Myers	L 1–3	16–15–3 (11–10–3)
WHEA Tournament
February 24	Vermont*		Schneider Arena • Providence, RI (Quarterfinal, Game 1)	Madison Myers	W 5–4	17–15–3
February 25	Vermont*		Schneider Arena • Providence, RI (Quarterfinal, Game 2)	Madison Myers	L 1-5	17–16–3
February 26	Vermont*		Schneider Arena • Providence, RI (Quarterfinal, Game 3)	Madison Myers	L 1-5	17–17–3
*Non-conference game. ^{#}Rankings from USCHO.com Poll.

== Awards and honors ==
Coach Bob Deraney claimed his 300th career win at Maine on January 29.
