= 2016–17 Harvard Crimson women's ice hockey season =

- Conference: 9th ECAC
- Home ice: Bright-Landry Hockey Center

Record
- Overall: 5–19–5
- Home: 2–10–2
- Road: 3–8–2
- Neutral: 0–1–1

Coaches and captains
- Head coach: Katey Stone
- Assistant coaches: Lee-J Mirasolo; Liz Keady; Mark Hanson
- Captain(s): Sydney Daniels; Briana Mastel

The Harvard Crimson represented Harvard University in ECAC women's ice hockey during the 2016–17 NCAA Division I women's ice hockey season.

== Offseason ==
- June 18: Sydney Daniels was drafted by the New York Riveters in the NWHL draft.

=== Recruiting ===
Player	Position	Nationality	Notes
Kyra Colbert	Defense	Canada	Played for Mississauga Jr. Chiefs
Kat Hughes	Forward	United States	Attended Shattuck-St. Mary's
Beth Larcom	Goaltender	United States	Member of Team USA U18
Ali Peper	Defense	United States	Played with Colorado Select
Val Turgeon	Forward	United States	Attended Shattuck-St. Mary's
Emily Yue	Goaltender	United States	Competed with Mid-Fairfield Connecticut Stars

== Roster ==
=== 2016-17 Crimson ===
No.	Nat.	Player	Class	Pos	Height	DoB	Hometown	Previous team
1		Brianna Laing	Senior	G	5' 6" (1.68 m)		Marblehead, Massachusetts	Noble and Greenough
5		Kyra Colbert	Freshman	D	5' 9" (1.75 m)		Toronto, Ontario	Mississauga Jr. Chiefs
6		Nikki Friesen	Junior	F	5' 4" (1.63 m)		Corvallis, Oregon	Chatfield
7		Natasha Rachlin	Senior	D	5' 4" (1.63 m)		Brookline, Massachusetts	Noble and Greenough
9		Bradley Fusco	Sophomore	F	5' 3" (1.6 m)		Winchester, Massachusetts	East Coast Wizards
10		Dani Krzyszczyk	Junior	F	5' 6" (1.68 m)		Winnipeg, Manitoba	Shattuck-St. Mary's
11		Audrey Warner	Sophomore	F	5' 10" (1.78 m)		Shaker Heights, Ohio	Shattuck-St. Mary's
13		Ali Peper	Freshman	D	5' 7" (1.7 m)		Arvada, Colorado	Colorado Select
14		Kate Hallett	Sophomore	D	5' 8" (1.73 m)		Edina, Minnesota	Minnesota Jr. Whitecaps
16		Lexie Laing	Junior	F	5' 6" (1.68 m)		Marblehead, Massachusetts	Noble and Greenough
17		Briana Mastel (C)	Senior	D	5' 8" (1.73 m)		Wallingford, Connecticut	Choate Rosemary Hall
19		Kat Hughes	Freshman	F	5' 7" (1.7 m)		New York, New York	Shattuck-St. Mary's
22		Kaitlin Tse	Sophomore	D	5' 7" (1.7 m)		Toronto, Ontario	Team Canada U18
23		Val Turgeon	Freshman	F	5' 6" (1.68 m)		Denver, Colorado	Shattuck-St. Mary's
24		Chelsea Ziadie	Junior	D	5' 3" (1.6 m)		Pointe Claire, Quebec	Hotchkiss School
25		Sydney Daniels (C)	Senior	F	5' 8" (1.73 m)		Southwick, Massachusetts	Westminster School
26		Haley Mullins	Junior	F	5' 9" (1.75 m)		East Greenwich, Rhode Island	Noble and Greenough
28		Abbey Frazer	Senior	D	5' 7" (1.7 m)		Hudson, Quebec	John Abbot College
31		Beth Larcom	Freshman	G	5' 8" (1.73 m)		Middletown, Rhode Island	Team USA U18
32		Emily Yue	Freshman	G	5' 2" (1.57 m)		Guilford, Connecticut	Mid-Fairfield CT Stars
35		Molly Tissenbaum	Senior	G	5' 7" (1.7 m)		Toronto, Ontario	Premier Elite

== Schedule ==
Date	Opponent^{#}	Rank^{#}	Site	Decision	Result	Record
Regular Season
October 23	at Dartmouth		Thompson Arena • Hanover, NH	Brianna Laing	W 5–1	1–0–0 (1–0–0)
October 28	at #8 Clarkson		Cheel Arena • Potsdam, NY	Molly Tissenbaum	L 0–4	1–1–0 (1–1–0)
October 29	at #7 St. Lawrence		Appleton Arena • Canton, NY	Brianna Laing	L 0–4	1–2–0 (1–2–0)
November 11	#10 Princeton		Bright-Landry Hockey Center • Allston, MA	Molly Tissenbaum	L 1–2 ^{OT}	1–3–0 (1–3–0)
November 12	#8 Quinnipiac		Bright-Landry Hockey Center • Allston, MA	Brianna Laing	L 1–2	1–4–0 (1–4–0)
November 15	at New Hampshire*		Whittemore Center • Durham, NH	Molly Tissenbaum	L 2–3 ^{OT}	1–5–0
November 22	Boston University*		Bright-Landry Hockey Center • Allston, MA	Brianna Laing	L 3–4 ^{OT}	1–6–0
November 25	#4 Minnesota-Duluth*		Bright-Landry Hockey Center • Allston, MA	Molly Tissenbaum	L 1–4	1–7–0
November 26	#4 Minnesota-Duluth*		Bright-Landry Hockey Center • Allston, MA	Molly Tissenbaum	L 1–2 ^{OT}	1–8–0
December 2	at Cornell		Lynah Rink • Ithaca, NY	Molly Tissenbaum	L 0–3	1–9–0 (1–5–0)
December 3	at #7 Colgate		Class of 1965 Arena • Hamilton, NY	Beth Larcom	T 3–3 ^{OT}	1–9–1 (1–5–1)
January 6, 2017	at #8 Quinnipiac		High Point Solutions Arena • Hamden, CT	Beth Larcom	T 2–2 ^{OT}	1–9–2 (1–5–2)
January 7	at Princeton		Hobey Baker Memorial Rink • Princeton, NJ	Molly Tissenbaum	L 1–2	1–10–2 (1–6–2)
January 10	vs. #6 Boston College*		Fenway Park • Boston, MA (Frozen Fenway 2017)	Brianna Laing	L 1–3	1–11–2
January 13	Rensselaer		Bright-Landry Hockey Center • Allston, MA	Beth Larcom	L 1–3	1–12–2 (1–7–2)
January 14	Union		Bright-Landry Hockey Center • Allston, MA	Molly Tissenbaum	L 2–3 ^{OT}	1–13–2 (1–8–2)
January 17	Dartmouth		Bright-Landry Hockey Center • Allston, MA	Brianna Laing	W 2–1	2–13–2 (2–8–2)
January 20	at Brown		Meehan Auditorium • Providence, RI	Brianna Laing	W 3–1	3–13–2 (3–8–2)
January 21	at Yale		Ingalls Rink • New Haven, CT	Brianna Laing	L 2–3	3–14–2 (3–9–2)
January 27	Colgate		Bright-Landry Hockey Center • Allston, MA	Beth Larcom	L 0–4	3–15–2 (3–10–2)
January 28	#8 Cornell		Bright-Landry Hockey Center • Allston, MA	Molly Tissenbaum	T 2–2 ^{OT}	3–15–3 (3–10–3)
January 31	at Northeastern*		Matthews Arena • Boston, MA (Beanpot, Opening Game)	Molly Tissenbaum	L 1–4	3–16–3
February 3	#5 St. Lawrence		Bright-Landry Hocket Center • Allston, MA	Brianna Laing	L 1–2	3–17–3 (3–11–3)
February 4	#3 Clarkson		Bright-Landry Hocket Center • Allston, MA	Beth Larcom	T 2–2 ^{OT}	3–17–4 (3–11–4)
February 7	vs. Boston University*		Matthews Arena • Boston, MA (Beanpot Consolation Game)	Beth Larcom	T 6–6 ^{OT}	3–17–5
February 10	at Union		Achilles Center • Schenectady, NY	Beth Larcom	W 2–0	4–17–5 (4–11–4)
February 11	at Rensselaer		Houston Field House • Troy, NY	Beth Larcom	L 1–4	4–18–5 (4–12–4)
February 17	Yale		Bright-Landry Hockey Center • Allston, MA	Brianna Laing	W 5–0	5–18–5 (5–12–4)
February 18	Brown		Bright-Landry Hockey Center • Allston, MA	Brianna Laing	L 1–3	5–19–5 (5–13–4)
*Non-conference game. ^{#}Rankings from USCHO.com Poll.
