= List of NCAA acrobatics and tumbling programs =

These collegiate women's acrobatics and tumbling teams compete as members of the National Collegiate Athletic Association (NCAA). In the 2025–26 school year, 48 NCAA member athletic programs sponsored the sport. The majority of competing programs were members of Division II, with one of these programs (Azusa Pacific) starting a transition to Division III in 2026–27. Eleven Division I members and 9 Division III members competed in 2025–26. That school year saw acrobatics & tumbling elevated from the NCAA Emerging Sports for Women program to official championship status. The first championship, using what the NCAA calls the "National Collegiate" format, in which members of all divisions compete, will be held in spring 2027 (part of the 2026–27 school year).

Acrobatics & tumbling first became an NCAA-recognized sport as part of the Emerging Sports for Women program in 2020–21.

== Current teams ==
As of the most recent 2025–26 season, these schools sponsor an NCAA-recognized women's acrobatics & tumbling team. All institutions on this list are located within the United States. Conference affiliations reflect those for acrobatics & tumbling, and do not necessarily match the schools' primary conferences.

NB: Conference affiliations are mostly drawn from the NCAA membership directory. However, some schools are listed in that directory with acrobatics/tumbling membership in conferences that do not sponsor the sport. All discrepancies were cross-checked against conference websites.

Institution	Teams	Location	State/province	Conference	Division
Baylor	Bears	Waco	TX	Independent	I
Canisius	Golden Griffins	Buffalo	NY	Independent	I
Duquesne	Dukes	Pittsburgh	PA	Independent	I
Iona	Gaels	New Rochelle	NY	Independent	I
La Salle	Explorers	Philadelphia	PA	Independent	I
LIU	Sharks	Brookville (Note: LIU has two physical campuses—LIU Brooklyn, in said New York City borough, and LIU Post in Brookville. The acrobatics & tumbling program operates out of the Post campus. All LIU teams are open to NCAA-eligible students at both campuses.)	NY	Independent	I
Missouri State	Lady Bears	Springfield	MO	Independent	I
Morgan State	Lady Bears	Baltimore	MD	Independent	I
Oregon	Ducks	Eugene	OR	Independent	I
Presbyterian	Blue Hose	Clinton	SC	Independent	I
Quinnipiac	Bobcats	Hamden	CT	Independent	I
American International	Yellow Jackets	Springfield	MA	Independent	II
Augustana (SD)	Vikings	Sioux Falls	SD	Independent	II
Azusa Pacific	Cougars	Azusa	CA	Independent	II (Note: Azusa Pacific will compete in Division III starting in 2026–27.)
Belmont Abbey	Crusaders	Belmont	NC	Conference Carolinas	II
Bluefield State	Big Blue	Bluefield	WV	Independent	II
Caldwell	Cougars	Caldwell	NJ	Independent	II
Coker	Cobras	Hartsville	SC	Conference Carolinas	II
Converse	Valkyries	Spartanburg	SC	Conference Carolinas	II
D'Youville	Saints	Buffalo	NY	Independent	II
Emmanuel (GA)	Lions	Franklin Springs	GA	Conference Carolinas	II
Fairmont State	Fighting Falcons	Fairmont	WV	Mountain East Conference	II
Francis Marion	Patriots	Florence	SC	Conference Carolinas	II
Frostburg State	Bobcats	Frostburg	MD	Mountain East Conference	II
Gannon	Golden Knights	Erie	PA	Independent	II
Georgian Court	Lions	Lakewood	NJ	Independent	II
Glenville State	Pioneers	Glenville	WV	Mountain East Conference	II
Hawaii Pacific	Sharks	Honolulu	HI	Independent	II
King	Tornado	Bristol	TN	Conference Carolinas	II
Kutztown	Golden Bears	Kutztown	PA	Independent	II
Lander	Bearcats	Greenwod	SC	Conference Carolinas	II
Mars Hill	Lions	Mars Hill	NC	Conference Carolinas	II
Montevallo	Falcons	Montevallo	AL	Conference Carolinas	II
Newberry	Wolves	Newberry	SC	Conference Carolinas	II
Saint Leo	Lions	St. Leo	FL	Independent	II
West Liberty	Hilltoppers	West Liberty	WV	Mountain East Conference	II
West Virginia State	Yellow Jackets	Institute	WV	Mountain East Conference	II
Wheeling	Cardinals	Wheeling	WV	Mountain East Conference	II
Wingate	Bulldogs	Wingate	NC	Conference Carolinas	II
Adrian	Bulldogs	Adrian	MI	Independent	III
Buffalo State	Bengals	Buffalo	NY	Independent	III
Calvin	Knights	Grand Rapids	MI	Independent	III
Concordia (WI)	Falcons	Mequon	WI	Independent	III
East Texas Baptist (ETBU)	Tigers	Marshall	TX	Independent	III
Mary Hardin-Baylor (UMHB)	Crusaders	Belton	TX	Independent	III
Stevenson	Mustangs	Owings Mills (Note: Stevenson has two physical campuses, one in Owings Mills and the other in Stevenson. While the NCAA directory lists the school as being located in Stevenson, the acrobatics & tumbling program operates out of Owings Mills. All Stevenson teams are open to NCAA-eligible students at both campuses.)	MD	Independent	III
Texas Lutheran	Bulldogs	Seguin	TX	Independent	III
Trine	Thunder	Angola	IN	Independent	III

== Future teams ==
In addition to those listed above, three schools are known to be adding acrobatics & tumbling, one in 2026–27 and two in 2027–28.

Institution	Teams	Location	State	Conference	Div.	First season
Westminster (PA)	Titans	New Wilmington	PA	TBA	III	2026–27
Gettysburg	Bullets	Gettysburg	PA	TBA	III	2027–28
Sacred Heart	Pioneers	Fairfield	CT	TBA	I	2027–28
