= Sacred Heart Pioneers =

Collegiate sports club in the United States

- University: Sacred Heart University
- Nickname: Pioneers
- NCAA: Division I (FCS)
- Conference: MAAC (main); Other conferences: List: CAA Football; Atlantic Hockey America (men's ice hockey); New England Women's Hockey Alliance (women's ice hockey); Eastern Intercollegiate Wrestling Association (men's wrestling); Eastern Intercollegiate Volleyball Association (men's volleyball); ECAC (equestrian); NEIFC (fencing); NEC (field hockey); CUSA (bowling)
- Athletic director: Judy Ann Riccio
- Location: Fairfield, Connecticut
- Varsity teams: 32
- Football stadium: Campus Field
- Basketball arena: William H. Pitt Center
- Ice hockey arena: Martire Family Arena
- Baseball stadium: Veterans Memorial Park
- Colors: Red and white
- Mascot: Big Red the Pioneer
- Website: sacredheartpioneers.com

The Sacred Heart Pioneers are the 32 sports teams (14 men, 18 women) representing Sacred Heart University in Fairfield, Connecticut in intercollegiate athletics. The Pioneers compete in the NCAA Division I and are members of the Metro Atlantic Athletic Conference (MAAC; the school's primary conference), plus several other conferences for select sports, among them Atlantic Hockey America, Conference USA, the Eastern Intercollegiate Wrestling Association, and the New England Women's Hockey Alliance.

== History ==
Nearly 800 students participate in the university's 31 athletic teams (17 female teams and 14 male teams) along with more than 500 students who participate in 23 club sports.

The football team plays at the Football Championship Subdivision level and claims an FCS title in 2001. Their biggest rivalry is with the oldest public university in Connecticut, Central Connecticut State University, in what has been dubbed the Constitution State Rivalry.

The men's basketball team won the Division II national title in 1986.

The women's basketball team won the Northeast Conference regular season title five times and the conference tournament three times and earned three trips to the NCAA Tournament.

The baseball team has won four Northeast Conference tournament titles and made four NCAA tournament appearances, formerly led by Super Bowl XVII champion, Nick Giaquinto. The four conference titles are tied for the most in the conference.

The men's golf team won the Northeast Conference title in 2008, 2009, 2011, and 2022.

The men's fencing team won the Northeast Conference title five years in a row (2010–14) and was ranked #9 in 2011.

On February 21, 2013, the Sacred Heart University athletics department hired longtime Major League Baseball player and manager Bobby Valentine as the athletic director.

On June 8, 2021, the Sacred Heart University athletics department named Judy Ann Riccio as its interim athletic director, replacing Bobby Valentine who took a leave of absence.

The men's ice hockey program competes in the Atlantic Hockey America conference, and the women's hockey program competes in the newly created New England Women's Hockey Alliance (NEWHA) and won the conference's initial tournament title in the 2017-18 season, beating out institutions such as the College of the Holy Cross and Saint Anselm College.

The men's wrestling team competes in the Eastern Intercollegiate Wrestling Association and the field hockey team competes in the Metro Atlantic Athletic Conference. Men's volleyball competes in the Eastern Intercollegiate Volleyball Association, in which it has been a member since 1993 except for the first two seasons of NEC men's volleyball in 2023 and 2024. (Note: Because NCAA men's volleyball is a spring sport, the NEC officially started sponsoring the sport in the 2022–23 academic year.)

On September 21, 2020, Sacred Heart announced the addition of a women's wrestling program, the second for a Division I institution (the first being Presbyterian College) and the first in the Northeast region. The program started in the fall of 2021.

Sacred Heart earned its first NCAA men's lacrosse tournament bid in 2024, winning the MAAC tournament and getting the automatic conference bid to that year's NCAA tournament.

After leaving the NEC in 2024, Sacred Heart bowling spent the 2024–25 season as an independent before becoming a single-sport member of Conference USA.

Most recently, SHU announced on March 18, 2026 that it would add acrobatics and tumbling, which had been elevated from the NCAA Emerging Sports for Women program to full championship status that January, as its next varsity sport. The first season of competition is planned for 2027–28.

=== Classification ===
Years	Classification	Seasons
1999–2000 to present	NCAA Division I	27
1965–66 to 1998–99	NCAA Division II	34

=== Conference affiliation ===
Years	Conference	Seasons
2024–25 to present	Metro Atlantic Athletic Conference	2
1999–2000 to 2023–24	Northeast Conference	25
1981–82 to 1998–99	New England Collegiate Conference	18
1965–66 to 1980–81	Division II Independent	16

== Sports sponsored ==
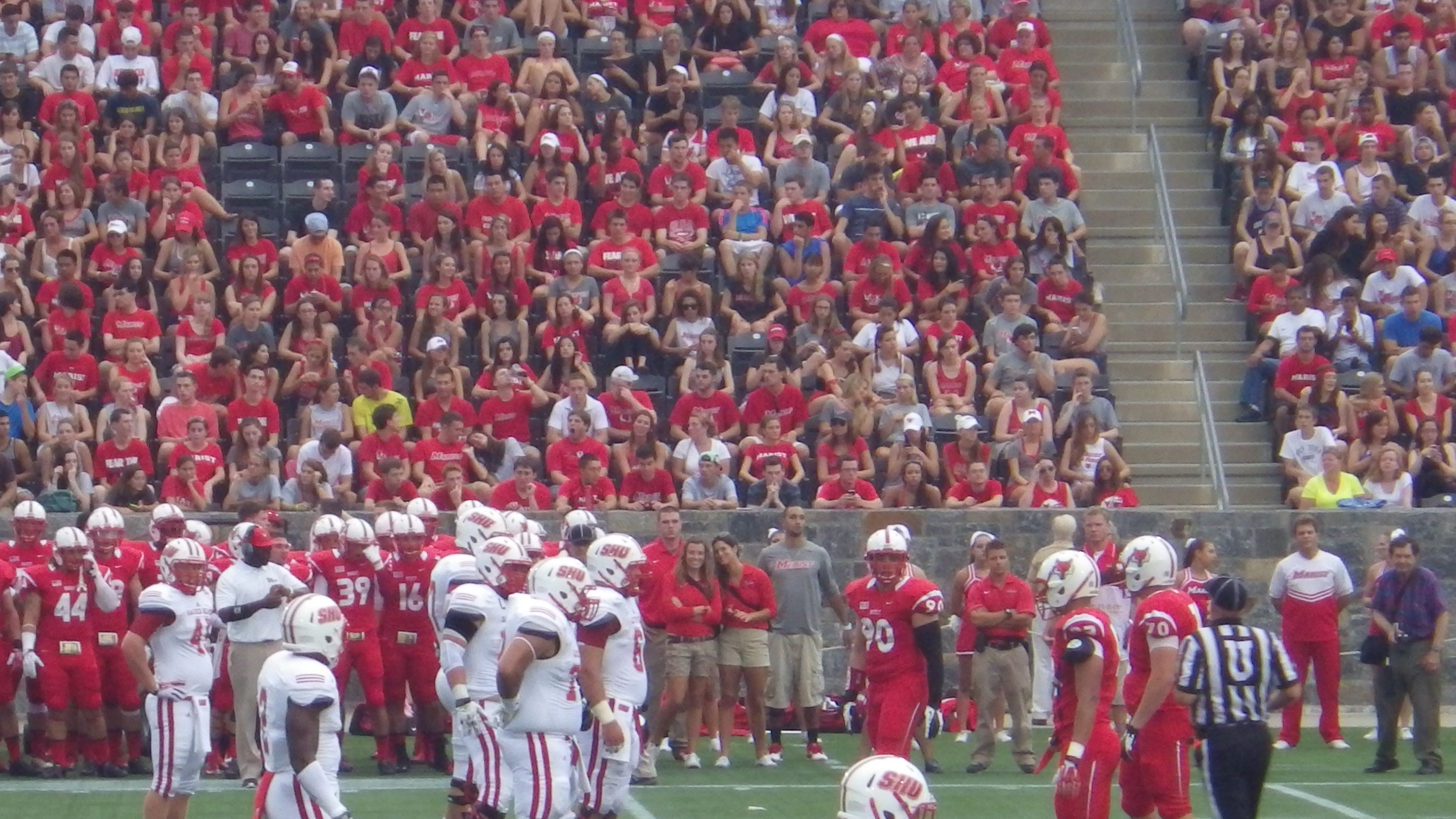
Football game v Marist in 2013

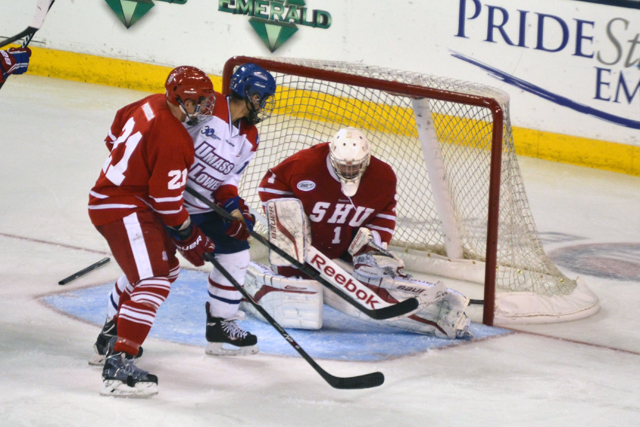
Ice hockey game in 2014

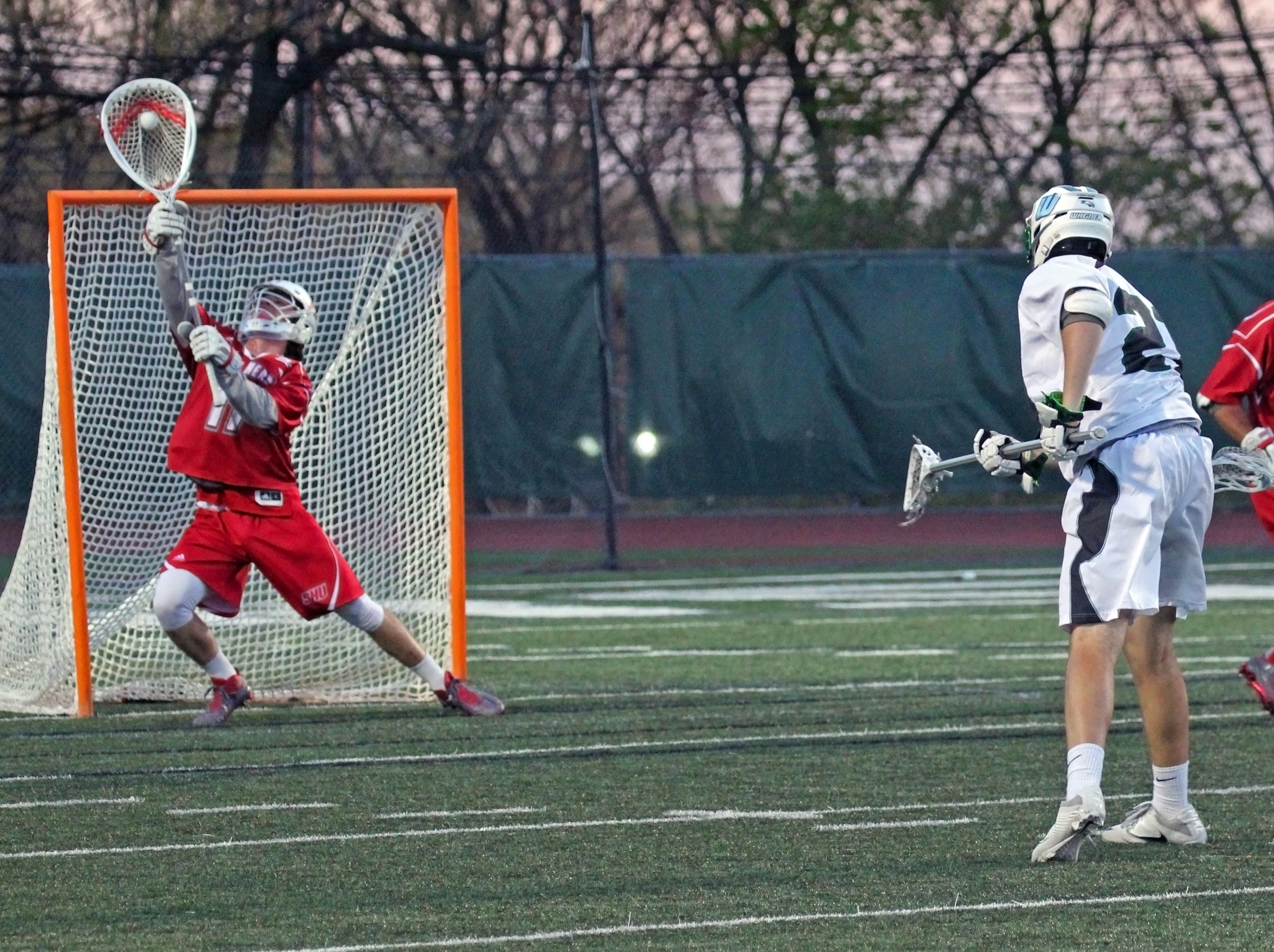
Lacrosse game in 2017

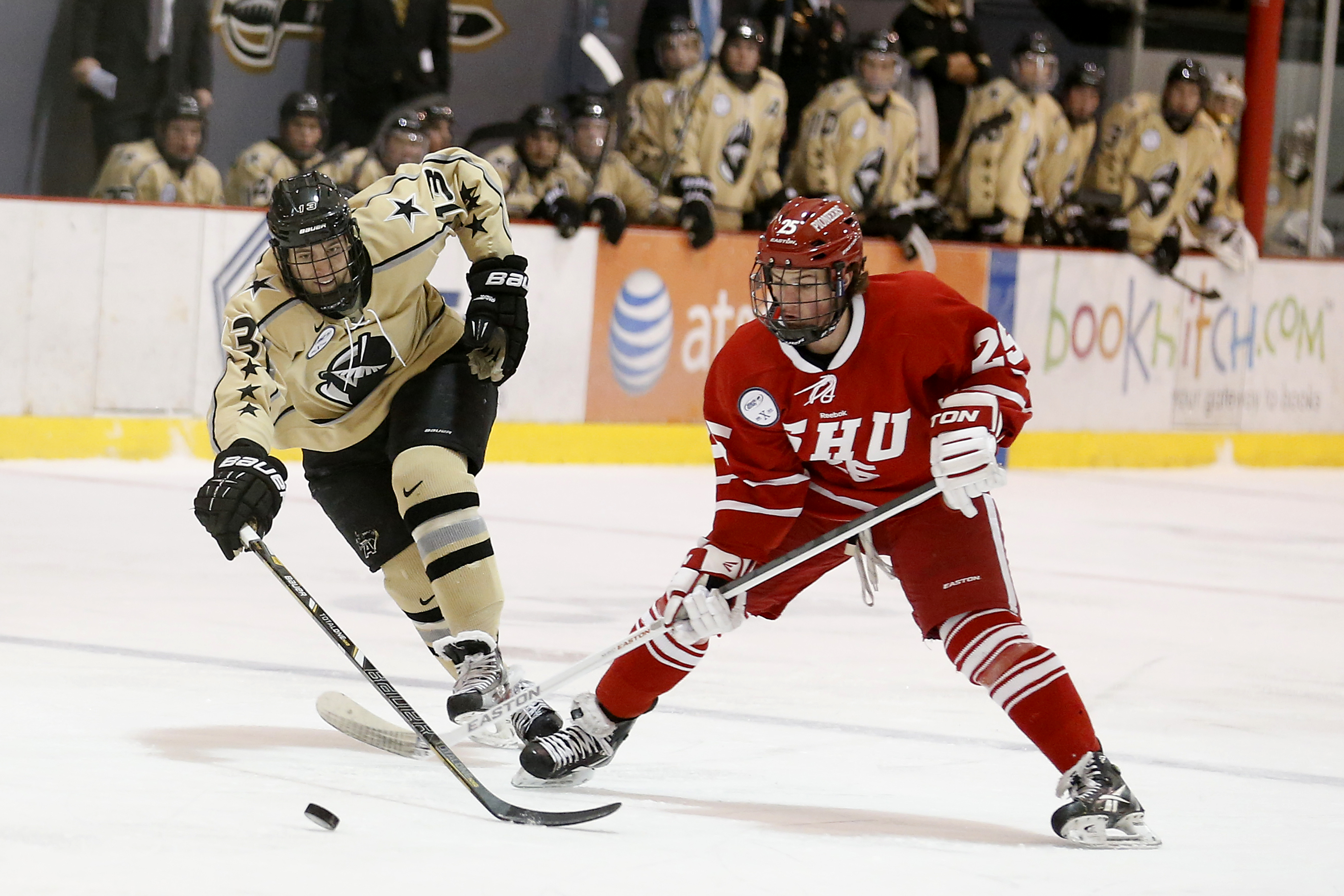
Ice hockey v Army (2012)

Men's sports	Women's sports
Baseball	Acrobatics & tumbling (2027–28)
Basketball	Basketball
Cross country	Bowling
Fencing	Cross country
Football	Equestrian
Ice hockey	Fencing
Lacrosse	Field hockey
Soccer	Golf
Tennis	Ice hockey
Track & field^{†}	Lacrosse
Volleyball	Rowing
Wrestling	Rugby
	Soccer
	Softball
	Swimming & diving
	Tennis
	Track & field^{1}
	Volleyball
	Wrestling
^{1} – includes both indoor and outdoor

=== Club sports ===
Currently, 28 club sports are active on campus. The active clubs are:

- Baseball
- Men's basketball
- Women's basketball
- Bowling
- Dance team
- Field hockey
- Figure skating
- Gymnastics
- Golf
- Esports
- Men's football
- Men's ice hockey
- Men's lacrosse
- Women's lacrosse
- Men's rugby
- Running
- Sailing
- Chess
- Men's soccer
- Women's soccer
- Softball
- Men's swimming
- Tennis
- Ultimate
- Men's volleyball
- Women's volleyball
- Weightlifting
