= Progress toward degree =

The progress toward degree rule, commonly referred to as the 40-60-80 rule, is a piece of National Collegiate Athletic Association (NCAA) legislation designed to increase retention and graduation rates of NCAA Division I student athletes. The legislation, that took effect for first time freshmen in 2003, states that by the beginning of the student-athlete's third year of college enrollment, they must have completed 40% of the classes required toward a specific degree. This rate of progress toward a specific degree must continue so that by the beginning of the student-athlete's fourth year, they must have completed 60% and by the beginning of their fifth year, they must have completed 80% of their required coursework toward a specific degree. This legislation, part of many academically oriented rules the NCAA has put into place over the past 20 years, was written in response to several calls for reform of "big time" college athletics including, most notably, the Knight Commission.

== See also ==
- Perpetual student
