= List of current NCAA Division I champions =

NCAA Division I champions are the winners of annual top-tier competitions among American college sports teams. This list also includes championships classified by the NCAA as "National Collegiate", the organization's official branding of championship events open to members of more than one of the NCAA's three legislative and competitive divisions. (Note: The only exception to the "National Collegiate" branding is the Division I men's ice hockey championship. While it is currently open to members of Division II, as well as a small number of Division III members, it is styled as a "Division I" championship because the NCAA previously sponsored a D-II championship in that sport.)

In college football, the only championship actually awarded by the NCAA is that of the second level of D-I football, the Football Championship Subdivision. While champions of the top level, the Football Bowl Subdivision, are included in NCAA record books, the NCAA has never awarded an official championship at that level. FBS championships are awarded by non-NCAA bodies, with the current de facto championship, the College Football Playoff, operated by a consortium of FBS conferences.

== Men's champions ==
Sport	Date	Winning team	Winning head coach	Score	Runner-up	Runner-up head coach	Venue	City	Ref.
Baseball	June 20–22, 2026	Oklahoma	Skip Johnson	2–1 in best-of-3 series (9–3, 2–6, 13–2)	North Carolina	Scott Forbes	Charles Schwab Field Omaha	Omaha, Nebraska	
Basketball	April 6, 2026	Michigan	Dusty May	69–63	UConn	Dan Hurley	Lucas Oil Stadium	Indianapolis, Indiana	
Cross country	November 22, 2025	Oklahoma State	Dave Smith	57 (+25)	New Mexico	Darren Gauson	Gans Creek Cross Country Course	Columbia, Missouri	
Fencing	March 19–22, 2026	Notre Dame	Gia Kvaratskhelia	91 (+10)	Columbia	Michael Aufrichtig	Joyce Center	Notre Dame, Indiana	
Football (FBS)	January 19, 2026	Indiana	Curt Cignetti	27–21	Miami (FL)	Mario Cristobal	Hard Rock Stadium	Miami Gardens, Florida	
Football (FCS)	January 5, 2026	Montana State	Brent Vigen	35–34^{OT}	Illinois State	Brock Spack	FirstBank Stadium	Nashville, Tennessee	
Golf	June 3, 2026	Auburn	Nick Clinard	4–1	UCLA	Armen Kirakossian	Omni La Costa Resort & Spa	Carlsbad, California	
Gymnastics	April 18, 2026	Stanford	Thom Glielmi	329.825 (+1.330)	Oklahoma	Mark Williams	State Farm Center	Champaign, Illinois	
Ice hockey	April 11, 2026	Denver	David Carle	2–1	Wisconsin	Mike Hastings	T-Mobile Arena	Las Vegas, Nevada	
Indoor track	March 13–14, 2026	Arkansas	Doug Case	73.5 (+ 33.5)	Oregon	Jerry Schumacher	Randal Tyson Center	Fayetteville, Arkansas	
Lacrosse	May 25, 2026	Princeton	Chad Palumbo	16–9	Notre Dame	Matt Madalon	Scott Stadium	Charlottesville, Virginia (Note: The venue has a Charlottesville mailing address but is in unincorporated Albemarle County.)	
Outdoor track	June 10–13, 2026	Arkansas	Doug Case	56 (+ 7)	Georgia	Caryl Smith-Gilbert	Hayward Field	Eugene, Oregon	
Soccer	December 15, 2025	Washington	Jamie Clark	3–2^{OT}	NC State	Marc Hubbard	WakeMed Soccer Park	Cary, North Carolina	
Swimming & diving	March 25–28, 2026	Texas	Bob Bowman	445.5 (+ 29.5)	Florida	Anthony Nesty	Georgia Tech Aquatic Center	Atlanta, Georgia	
Tennis	May 17, 2026	Virginia	Andres Pedroso	4–3	Texas	Bruce Berque	Dan Magill Tennis Complex	Athens, Georgia	
Volleyball	May 11, 2026	Hawaiʻi	Charlie Wade	3–1	UC Irvine	David Kniffin	Pauley Pavilion	Los Angeles, California	
Water polo	December 7, 2025	UCLA	Adam Wright	11–10	USC	Marko Pintaric	Avery Aquatic Center	Stanford, California	
Wrestling	March 19–21, 2026	Penn State	Cael Sanderson	181.5 (+ 50.5)	Oklahoma State	David Taylor	Rocket Arena	Cleveland, Ohio	

== Women's champions ==
Sport	Date	Winning team	Winning head coach	Score	Runner-up	Runner-up head coach	Venue	City	Ref.
Basketball	April 5, 2026	UCLA	Cori Close	79–51	South Carolina	Dawn Staley	Mortgage Matchup Center	Phoenix, Arizona	
Beach volleyball	May 3, 2026	UCLA	Jenny Johnson Jordan	3–0	Stanford	Andrew Fuller	Gulf Shores Public Beach	Gulf Shores, Alabama	
Bowling	April 11, 2026	Jacksonville State	Shannon O'Keefe	4–1	Wichita State	Holly Harris	Yorktown Lanes	Parma Heights, Ohio	
Cross country	November 22, 2025	NC State	Laurie Henes	114 (+16)	BYU	Diljeet Taylor	Gans Creek Cross Country Course	Columbia, Missouri	
Fencing	March 19–22, 2026	Notre Dame	Gia Kvaratskhelia	102 (+3)	Columbia/Barnard	Michael Aufrichtig	Joyce Center	Notre Dame, Indiana	
Field hockey	November 23, 2025	Northwestern	Tracey Fuchs	2–1^{2OT}	Princeton	Carla Tagliente	Jack Katz Stadium	Durham, North Carolina	
Golf	May 27, 2026	Stanford	Anne Walker	3.5–1.5	USC	Justin Silverstein	Omni La Costa Resort & Spa	Carlsbad, California	
Gymnastics	April 18, 2026	Oklahoma	K.J. Kindler	198.1625 (+0.0875)	LSU	Jay Clark	Dickies Arena	Fort Worth, Texas	
Ice hockey	March 22, 2026	Wisconsin	Mark Johnson	3–2	Ohio State	Nadine Muzerall	Pegula Ice Arena	College Township, Pennsylvania (Note: The venue has a University Park mailing address.)	
Indoor track	March 13–14, 2026	Georgia	Caryl Smith-Gilbert	53 (+9)	Oregon	Jerry Schumacher	Randal Tyson Center	Fayetteville, Arkansas	
Lacrosse	May 24, 2026	Northwestern	Kelly Amonte Hiller	14–11	North Carolina	Jenny Levy	Martin Stadium	Evanston, Illinois	
Outdoor track	June 10–13, 2026	Georgia	Caryl Smith-Gilbert	50 (+7)	Florida	Mike Holloway	Hayward Field	Eugene, Oregon	
Rowing	May 29–31, 2026	Texas	Dave O'Neill	130 (+5)	Stanford	Derek Byrnes	Lake Lanier Olympic Park	Gainesville, Georgia	
Soccer	December 8, 2025	Florida State	Brian Pensky	1–0	Stanford	Paul Ratcliffe	CPKC Stadium	Kansas City, Missouri	
Softball	June 3–4, 2026	Texas	Mike White	2–0 in best-of-3 series (7–3, 4–1)	Texas Tech	Gerry Glasco	Devon Park	Oklahoma City, Oklahoma	
Swimming & diving	March 18–21, 2026	Virginia	Todd DeSorbo	589 (+208.5)	Stanford	Greg Meehan	Georgia Tech Aquatic Center	Atlanta, Georgia	
Tennis	May 17, 2026	Texas A&M	Matk Weaver	4–1	Auburn	Bobby Reynolds	Dan Magill Tennis Complex	Athens, Georgia	
Volleyball	December 21, 2025	Texas A&M	Jamie Morrison	3–0	Kentucky	Craig Skinner	T-Mobile Center	Kansas City, Missouri	
Water polo	April 26, 2026	USC	Casey Moon	10–9	California	Coralie Simmons	Canyonview Aquatic Center	San Diego, California	
Wrestling	March 6–7, 2026	McKendree	Alexio Garcia	171 (+5)	Iowa	Clarissa Chun	Xtream Arena	Coralville, Iowa	

== Coeducational champions ==
Sport	Date	Winning team	Winning head coach	Score	Runner-up	Runner-up head coach	Venue	City	Ref.
Rifle	March 13–14, 2026	West Virginia	Jon Hammond	4,748 (+7)	TCU	Karen Monez	Covelli Center	Columbus, Ohio	
Skiing	March 11–14, 2026	Utah	Fredrik Landstedt	549.5 (+10.5)	Colorado	Jana Weinberger	Bridger Bowl & Crosscut Mountain Sports Center	Bozeman, Montana	
