= NCAA Division I =

Highest division of the National Collegiate Athletic Association

NCAA Division I logo

NCAA Division I (D-I) is the highest division of intercollegiate athletics sanctioned by the National Collegiate Athletic Association (NCAA) in the United States, which accepts players globally. D-I schools include the major collegiate athletic powers, with large budgets, more elaborate facilities and more athletic scholarships than Division II and Division III as well as many smaller schools committed to the highest level of intercollegiate competition.

This level was previously called the University Division of the NCAA, in contrast to the lower-level College Division; these terms were replaced with numeric divisions in 1973. The University Division was renamed Division I, while the College Division was split in two; the College Division members that offered scholarships or wanted to compete against those who did became Division II, while those who did not want to offer scholarships became Division III.

For college football only, D-I schools are further divided into the Football Bowl Subdivision (FBS), the Football Championship Subdivision (FCS), and those institutions that do not have any football program. FBS teams have more players receiving athletic scholarships than FCS teams and until 2024, had minimum game-attendance requirements. The FBS is named for its series of postseason bowl games, with various polls ranking teams after the conclusion of these games, while the FCS national champion is determined by a multi-team bracket tournament.

For the 2020–21 school year, Division I contained 357 of the NCAA's 1,066 member institutions, with 130 in the Football Bowl Subdivision (FBS), 127 in the Football Championship Subdivision (FCS), and 100 non-football schools, with six additional schools in the transition from Division II to Division I. There was a moratorium on any additional movement up to D-I until 2012, after which any school that wants to move to D-I must be accepted for membership by a conference and show the NCAA it has the financial ability to support a D-I program.

== Finances ==
Division I athletic programs generated $8.7 billion in revenue in the 2009–10 academic year 10 years ago. Men's teams provided 55%, women's teams 15%, and 30% was not categorized by sex or sport. Football and men's basketball are usually a university's only profitable sports, and are called "revenue sports". From 2008 to 2012, 205 varsity teams were dropped in NCAA Division I – 72 for women and 133 for men, with men's tennis, gymnastics and wrestling hit particularly hard.

In the Football Bowl Subdivision (130 schools in 2017), between 50 and 60 percent of football and men's basketball programs generated positive revenues (above program expenses). However, in the Football Championship Subdivision (124 schools in 2017), only four percent of football and five percent of men's basketball programs generated positive revenues.

In 2012, 2% of athletic budgets were spent on equipment, uniforms and supplies for male athletes at NCAA Division I Football Bowl Subdivision school, with the median spending per-school at $742,000.

In 2014, the NCAA and the student athletes debated whether student athletes should be paid. In April, the NCAA approved students-athletes receiving free unlimited meals and snacks. The NCAA stated "The adoption of the meals legislation finished a conversation that began in the Awards, Benefits, Expenses and Financial Aid Cabinet. Members have worked to find appropriate ways to ensure student-athletes get the nutrition they need without jeopardizing Pell Grants or other federal aid received by the neediest student-athletes. With their vote, members of the council said they believe loosening NCAA rules on what and when food can be provided from athletics departments is the best way to address the issue."

According to the finance section of the NCAA page, "The NCAA receives most of its annual revenue from two sources: television and marketing rights for the Division I Men's Basketball Championship and ticket sales for all championships. That money is distributed in more than a dozen ways—almost all of which directly support NCAA schools, conferences and nearly half a million student-athletes. About 60% of the NCAA's annual revenue—around $600 million—is annually distributed directly to Division I member schools and conferences, while more than $150 million funds Division I championships" (NCAA 2021).

== Football conferences ==
Under NCAA regulations, all Division I conferences defined as "multisport conferences" must meet the following criteria:

- A total of at least seven active Division I members. However, the NCAA's Grace Period rule (Bylaw 20.02.9.2) allows conferences to operate for up to two years with less than the minimum.
- Separate from the above, at least seven active Division 1 members that sponsor both men's and women's basketball.
- Sponsorship of at least 12 NCAA Division I sports.
- Minimum of six men's sports, with the following additional restrictions:
  - Men's basketball is a mandatory sport, and at least seven members must sponsor that sport.
  - Non-football conferences must sponsor at least two men's team sports other than basketball.
  - At least six members must sponsor five men's sports other than basketball, including either football or two other team sports.
- Minimum of six women's sports, with the following additional restrictions:
  - Women's basketball is a mandatory sport, with at least seven members sponsoring that sport.
  - At least two other women's team sports must be sponsored.
  - At least six members must sponsor five women's sports other than basketball, with at least two of those five being team sports. If a conference officially sponsors an NCAA "emerging sport" for women (as of 2026–27, equestrianism, flag football, rugby union, or triathlon), that sport will be counted if five members (instead of six) sponsor it.

=== FBS conferences ===
FBS conferences must meet a more stringent set of requirements for NCAA recognition than other conferences:

- A total of at least eight active FBS members.
- To be counted toward this total, a school must participate in conference play in at least six men's and eight women's sports, including men's and women's basketball, football, and at least two other women's team sports.
  - Each school may count one men's and one women's sport not sponsored by its primary conference toward the above limits, as long as that sport competes in another Division I conference. The men's and women's sports so counted need not be the same sport.

Conference	Nickname	Founded	Members	Sports	Headquarters	Total NCAA Titles	Men's NCAA Titles	Women's NCAA Titles	Co-ed NCAA Titles
American Conference ‡	American	1979 (Note: The conference was founded in 1979 as the original Big East Conference. It renamed itself the American Athletic Conference following a 2013 split along football lines. The non-FBS schools of the original conference left to form a new conference that purchased the Big East name, while the FBS schools continued to operate under the old Big East's charter and structure. The American also inherited the old Big East's Bowl Championship Series berth for the 2013 season, the last for the BCS.)	13 (Note: Thirteen full members and 14 football members, with Wichita State as the only non-football member and Army and Navy as football-only associates.: 14 full members and 15 football members in 2028 or sooner with addition of James Madison.) (Note: In addition to the full and football-only members, five schools have single-sport associate membership, and two are members in two sports.: Liberty and Marshall are members in women's swimming & diving only.; Missouri State is a member in men's soccer only.; Old Dominion and Vanderbilt are members in women's lacrosse only.; FIU is a member in men's soccer and women's swimming & diving.; Future full member James Madison is an affiliate in women's lacrosse and women's swimming & diving.)	20	Irving, Texas	55	37	18	0
Atlantic Coast Conference †	ACC	1953	18 (Note: Notre Dame is a full member except in football, in which it remains independent. It has committed to play five games each season against ACC opponents, and to play each other ACC member at least once every three years.)	28	Charlotte, North Carolina	150	87	58	5
Big Ten Conference †	Big Ten	1896	18 (Note: In addition to the full members, two schools have affiliate membership: Johns Hopkins, otherwise a Division III member, is an affiliate in both men's and women's lacrosse, sports in which the school fields Division I teams.; Notre Dame is a men's hockey affiliate.)	28	Rosemont, Illinois	317	229	72	16
Big 12 Conference †	Big 12	1996	16 (Note: In addition to the full members, the Big 12 has 15 members that participate in only one sport.: Boise State, Florida State, and South Carolina are beach volleyball members.; Denver is a member in women's gymnastics.; Florida, San Diego State, and UC Davis are members in women's lacrosse.; Fresno State competes in equestrian.; Old Dominion and Tulsa are members in women's rowing.; Missouri, Northern Iowa, Oklahoma, Utah Valley, and Wyoming compete in men's wrestling.)	25	Irving, Texas	166	163	3	0
Conference USA ‡	CUSA	1995 (Note: The conference was founded in 1995, with football competition starting in 1996.)	10 (Note: In addition to the full members, Conference USA features 11 schools that play a single sport in the conference, plus one that houses two sports in CUSA.: Florida Atlantic, South Florida, and UAB are members in beach volleyball.; Arkansas State, Nebraska, Sacred Heart, Valparaiso, Vanderbilt, Wichita State, Wright State, and Youngstown State are bowling associates.; Tulane is an associate in both beach volleyball and bowling.)	19	Dallas, Texas	1	1	0	0
Division I FBS Independents (Note: "Independents" is not a conference; it is simply a designation used for schools whose football programs do not play in any conference. All of these schools have conference memberships for other sports.)	Independents	–	2	1	–				
Mid-American Conference ‡	MAC	1946	12 (Note: 12 full members and 13 football members with Sacramento State as a football-only member.) (Note: In addition to the full members and football-only member Sacramento State, the Mid-American Conference features 20 other single-sport members.: Appalachian State, Bellarmine, James Madison, and Longwood compete in women's field hockey.; Bloomsburg, Clarion, Edinboro, George Mason, Lock Haven, Rider, and SIU Edwardsville compete in men's wrestling.; Delaware, High Point, and Temple compete in women's rowing.; Detroit Mercy, Robert Morris, and Youngstown State compete in women's lacrosse.; Drake, Omaha, and UIC are members in men's tennis.)	25	Cleveland, Ohio	4	4	0	0
Mountain West Conference ‡	MW	1999	10 (Note: 10 full members and 10 football members. One full member, Grand Canyon, does not sponsor football, and a second, UC Davis, continues to play FCS football. North Dakota State and Northern Illinois are football members.) (Note: In addition to the 10 full members, Colorado College, a Division III school with a Division I men's ice hockey team, plays Division I women's soccer in the MW; football affiliate Northern Illinois also houses women's gymnastics in the MW; and Utah Tech is a member in baseball and men's soccer.)	21	Enterprise, Nevada (Note: Mailing address is Las Vegas.)	21	13	5	3
Pac-12 Conference ‡	Pac-12	1915 (Note: The charter of the Pac-12 dates only to the formation of the Athletic Association of Western Universities (AAWU) in 1959. However, the Pac-12 claims the history of the Pacific Coast Conference, which was founded in 1915 and began competition in 1916, as its own. Of the nine members of the PCC at the time of its demise in June 1959, only Idaho never joined the Pac-12. The PCC's berth in the Rose Bowl passed to the AAWU.)	9 (Note: 9 full members and 8 football members; Gonzaga has not played football since 1941.) (Note: The Pac-12 also includes 13 associate members, 12 of which compete in a single sport and the other competing in two sports.: Air Force, Bakersfield, Little Rock, North Dakota State, Northern Colorado, Northern Illinois, and South Dakota State are men's wrestling members.; Cal Baptist, UC Riverside, and UC San Diego are men's soccer members.; Dallas Baptist, a Division II member that plays Division I baseball, is a member for that sport.; Southern Utah is a member in women's gymnastics.; Cal Poly is a member in men's soccer and men's wrestling.)	19	San Ramon, California	501	309	174	18
Southeastern Conference †	SEC	1932	16	22	Birmingham, Alabama	223	118	104	1
Sun Belt Conference ‡	Sun Belt	1976	14 (Note: 13 members no later than 2028 with loss of James Madison.) (Note: In addition to the full members, the SBC has seven associate members: Kentucky, South Carolina, UCF, and West Virginia are members in men's soccer.; Charleston, Mercer, and UNC Wilmington are members in beach volleyball.)	20	New Orleans, Louisiana	29	16	12	1

† "Power Four" conferences that had guaranteed berths in the New Year's Six, the bowl games associated with the College Football Playoff, before the playoff's 2024 expansion to 12 teams
‡ "Group of Six" conferences

=== FCS conferences ===
Conference	Nickname	Founded	Football members	Sports	Headquarters
Big Sky Conference	Big Sky	1963	13 (Note: The football membership consists of all 11 full members plus football-only affiliates Cal Poly and UC Davis.)	16	Ogden, Utah
Coastal Athletic Association Football Conference (Note: Administered by the multi-sports Coastal Athletic Association as a separate entity.)	CAA Football	2007 (Note: Reflects the establishment of CAA Football by the multi-sports Colonial Athletic Association, now the Coastal Athletic Association. CAA Football officially traces its history to 1947 through the Yankee Conference and Atlantic 10 Conference, and the history can be traced back further to 1938 via the New England Conference.)	13 (Note: Five of the 13 full members of the multi-sports CAA do not play football at all, and one full member, William & Mary, plays football in the Patriot League. CAA Football includes six schools outside the multi-sports CAA: Albany, Bryant, Maine, New Hampshire, Rhode Island, and Sacred Heart.)	1	Richmond, Virginia
Independents (Note: In football only; such schools almost always are members of multi-sport conferences.)			2 (Note: Chicago State is playing its first season of varsity football in 2026 as an independent. Merrimack became an independent after leaving the Northeast Conference (now officially the NEC) in 2024 for the non-football Metro Atlantic Athletic Conference (now the Metro Conference).: 1 independent in 2027, with Chicago State football joining the rest of the athletic program in the NEC.)	1	
Ivy League (Note: The 2025 season was the first in which the Ivy League participated in the FCS playoffs.)		1954 (Note: The members of the athletic Ivy League have a collective history dating back to at latest the 1901 formation of the Eastern Intercollegiate Basketball League. They also formed the Eastern Intercollegiate Baseball League in 1930. In 1945, the eight current Ivy League members signed the Ivy Group Agreement to govern football competition between the schools. The athletic Ivy League dates its formation to the 1954 extension of the Ivy Group Agreement to cover all sports. The basketball EIBL was directly absorbed by the Ivy League; the baseball EIBL continued to operate separately until it too was absorbed by the Ivy League in 1992.)	8	33 (Note: The count of 33 separately lists all men's and women's sports in which the Ivy League awards a team championship. The following caveats are noted: Includes three non-NCAA sports: men's rowing and men's and women's squash.; The Ivy League does not operate a championship event in men's or women's ice hockey. All Ivy members compete as members of ECAC Hockey for that conference's automatic bids to the NCAA men's and women's tournaments. Ivy champions are extrapolated from regular-season results of ECAC games involving two Ivy teams.; Through 2023–24, the Ivy League had a similar relationship with the Eastern Intercollegiate Wrestling Association in men's wrestling, with Ivy teams competing for NCAA tournament berths as EIWA members and the Ivy championship determined by results of dual meets between Ivy members. Starting in 2024–25, the Ivy League launched its own men's wrestling championship.)	Princeton, New Jersey
Mid-Eastern Athletic Conference (Note: The MEAC champion, since 2015, forgoes its automatic bid to allow its champion to participate in the Celebration Bowl. Non-champions are eligible for at-large bids (the most recent example being North Carolina Central in 2023).)	MEAC	1970	6 (Note: Of the 8 full MEAC members, two do not sponsor football: Coppin State and UMES.)	16	Norfolk, Virginia
Missouri Valley Football Conference	MVFC	1982	9	1	St. Louis, Missouri
NEC	NEC	1981	8 (Note: Of the 9 full NEC members, two do not sponsor football, and a third, Chicago State, is playing its first season of varsity football in 2026 as an FCS independent. The six football-sponsoring schools are joined by associate members Duquesne and Robert Morris.: 8 full members and 9 football members in 2027 with loss of non-football Le Moyne, plus Chicago State joining NEC football.)	24	Somerset, New Jersey
Ohio Valley Conference	OVC	1948	8 (Note: Of the 9 full OVC members, SIU Edwardsville and Southern Indiana do not sponsor football, while Morehead State competes in the Pioneer Football League. Charleston Southern and Gardner–Webb are football affiliates.)	20	Brentwood, Tennessee
Patriot League		1986	10 (Note: Of the 10 full Patriot members, American, Boston University, and Loyola (MD) do not sponsor football, while Army and Navy play FBS football in the American Conference. The five full members that play Patriot League football are joined by associates Fordham, Georgetown, Richmond, Villanova, and William & Mary.)	24	Center Valley, Pennsylvania
Pioneer Football League	PFL	1991	11	1	St. Louis, Missouri
Southern Conference	SoCon	1921	10 (Note: Of the 11 full SoCon members, only UNC Greensboro does not sponsor football.)	20	Spartanburg, South Carolina
Southland Conference	SLC	1963	10 (Note: Of the 12 full SLC members, two do not sponsor football: LSU New Orleans and Texas A&M–Corpus Christi.)	17	Frisco, Texas
Southwestern Athletic Conference (Note: The SWAC abstains from the championship tournament to allow for a longer regular season, an in-conference championship game and the winner participating in the Celebration Bowl. If a team is not in the championship game and not playing a regular season game on the 1st weekend of the FCS Playoffs. They could qualify for an at-large bid to play if selected.)	SWAC	1920	12	18	Birmingham, Alabama
United Athletic Conference	UAC; The United	1962 (Note: Operated as the Western Athletic Conference from 1962 to 2026.)	8 (Note: Of the 9 full members, Little Rock and UT Arlington do not sponsor football. West Florida is a football associate (and also the only associate member in any sport).)	16	Jacksonville, Florida

== Sports ==
=== Men's team sports ===
No.	Sport	Founded	Teams	Conf.	Roster limits	Season	Most Championships
1	Football	1869 (FBS); 1978 (FCS)	266 (138 FBS, 128 FCS)	23 (10 FBS, 13 FCS)	105	Fall	Princeton (28)
2	Basketball	1939	365	32	15	Winter	UCLA (11)
3	Baseball	1947	309	30	34	Spring	USC (12)
4	Soccer	1959	204	23	28	Fall	Saint Louis (10)
5	Ice hockey	1948	65	6	26	Winter	Denver (11)
6	Lacrosse	1971	77	10	48	Spring	Syracuse (10)
7	Volleyball	1970	30	9	18	Spring	UCLA (19)
8	Water polo	1969	29	4	24	Fall	California (14)

Notes
The NCAA officially classifies the men's championships in volleyball and water polo as "National Collegiate" championships, that being the designation for championships that are open to members of more than one NCAA division. The ice hockey championship, however, is styled as a "Division I" championship because of the previous existence of a separate Division II championship in that sport.

- Football: D-I football programs are divided into FBS and FCS. After the settlement of the House v. NCAA legal case took full effect in 2025–26, scholarship limits in all D-I sports were replaced by roster limits, which are now identical in FBS and FCS. The House settlement, by its terms, was binding on the original conference defendants in the case—the "Power Four" conferences and the Pac-12 Conference, which had "power" status before its 2024 collapse. Other D-I schools and conferences were allowed to opt into the House framework, and most did so. The most notable opt-outs were the Ivy League, which maintains its non-scholarship status, and the three service academies that play FBS football (Air Force, Army, Navy), which are barred by the Department of Defense from directly paying athletes.
- Soccer: As of the ongoing 2026 NCAA soccer season (part of the 2026–27 academic year), four of the 10 FBS conferences do not sponsor men's soccer: the Big 12, Conference USA, Mid-American Conference, and the SEC. Several other D-I conferences also do not sponsor the sport: the Big Sky, MEAC, Southland, SWAC, and United Athletic Conference (renamed from Western Athletic Conference in July 2026). The Mountain West Conference is the most recent conference to add men's soccer; it is sponsoring the sport for the first time in the 2026 season. The United Athletic Conference no longer sponsors men's soccer.
- Ice hockey: Almost all D-I ice hockey programs are in the Northeast, the Upper Midwest, or the Colorado Front Range. Only one D-I all-sports conference, the Big Ten, sponsors a men's hockey league. All other conferences operate as hockey-specific leagues. Of the 65 teams that competed in D-I hockey in 2025–26, 18 are otherwise classified as either D-II or D-III; a number of schools from D-II play in D-I ice hockey as the NCAA no longer sponsors a championship in D-II and many have traditional/cultural fan bases that support ice hockey, and the D-III schools were "grandfathered" in to D-I through their having sponsored hockey prior to the creation of D-III.
- Lacrosse: The vast majority of D-I lacrosse programs are from the Northeast, Southeast, and Mid-Atlantic. Only four D-I programs are not in the Eastern Time Zone: Air Force and Denver on the Colorado Front Range, Marquette in Milwaukee, and Utah.
- Volleyball: Of the traditional D-I conferences, only the Big West Conference and NEC sponsor men's volleyball, with those conferences respectively adding the sport in 2017–18 and 2022–23. Two of the other three major volleyball conferences, defined in that sport as leagues that include full Division I members, are volleyball-specific conferences; the third is the Mountain Pacific Sports Federation, a multi-sport conference that does not sponsor football or basketball. In addition to the D-I schools, 44 D-II schools competed in the National Collegiate division in 2025–26. Four Division II conferences sponsor the sport—Conference Carolinas, the East Coast Conference, the Great Lakes Valley Conference, and the Southern Intercollegiate Athletic Conference.
- Water polo: The number of D-I schools sponsoring men's water polo declined from 35 in 1987/88 to 22 in 2010/11, increasing to 29 in 2025–26. No school outside of California has ever made the finals of the championship, and all champions since 1998 have come from one of the four California schools that left the Pac-12 in 2024.

=== Men's individual sports ===
The following table lists the men's individual D-I sports with at least 1,000 participating athletes. Sports are ranked by number of athletes.

No.	Sport	Founded	Teams (2022)	Teams (1982)	Change	Athletes	Season
1	Track (outdoor)	1921	287	230	+57	11,387	Spring
2	Track (indoor)	1965	264	209	+55	10,369	Winter
3	Cross country	1938	315	256	+59	5,032	Fall
4	Swimming and diving	1937	130	181	−51	3,826	Winter
5	Golf	1939	292	263	+29	2,958	Spring
6	Wrestling	1928	76	146	−70	2,665	Winter
7	Tennis	1946	233	267	−34	2,293	Spring

D-I men's college wrestling has lost almost half of its programs since 1982.

=== Women's team sports ===
No.	Sport	Founded	Teams	Conf.	Roster limits	Season	Most Championships
1	Basketball	1982	363	32	15	Winter	UConn (12)
2	Soccer	1982	335	31	28	Fall	North Carolina (21)
3	Volleyball	1981	332	32	18	Fall	Stanford (9)
4	Softball	1982	293	32	25	Spring	UCLA (12)
5	Rowing	1997	87	12	68	Spring	Brown (7)
6	Lacrosse	1982	119	13	38	Spring	Maryland (14)
7	Field hockey	1981	77	10	27	Fall	North Carolina (11)
8	Ice hockey	2001	34	5	26	Winter	Wisconsin (9)
9	Beach volleyball	2016	62	5	19	Spring	USC (4)
10	Water polo	2001	34	6	24	Spring	Stanford (10)
11	Acrobatics & tumbling	(first championship in 2027)	11	0	55	Spring	First championship in 2027

Notes

- Women's sports were also affected by the House settlement, with roster limits also being introduced in 2025–26.
- Women's soccer is the fastest growing NCAA D-I women's team sport over a prolonged period, increasing from 22 teams in 1981–82 to 335 teams in 2021–22. However, in recent years, the fastest-growing has been beach volleyball, which went from 14 Division I teams in 2011–12 to 62 in 2021–22.
- ^{†} = Since the 2016–17 school year, rugby is classified by the NCAA as an "emerging sport" for women. Beach volleyball, which had previously been an "emerging sport" under the name of "sand volleyball", became an official NCAA championship sport in 2015–16.
- Two women's sports will hold their first official NCAA championships in 2026–27—acrobatics & tumbling and stunt. In addition to the 11 Division I schools that sponsored the former in 2025–26, 20 D-II and 10 D-III members also did so, and the first NCAA championship will use the National Collegiate format. As of May 2026, the NCAA membership directory does not provide a list of NCAA stunt programs.

=== Women's individual sports ===
The following table lists the women's individual D-I sports with at least 1,000 participating athletes. Sports are ranked by number of athletes.

No.	Sport	Teams (2022)	Teams (1982)	Change	Athletes	Season
1	Track (outdoor)	339	180	+159	13,672	Spring
2	Track (indoor)	331	127	+204	13,404	Winter
3	Cross country	347	183	+164	5,896	Fall
4	Swimming and diving	190	161	+29	5,886	Winter
5	Tennis	300	246	+54	2,817	Spring
6	Golf	262	83	+179	2,229	Spring
7	Gymnastics	61	99	−38	1,258	Winter

== Broadcasting and revenue ==
NCAA Division I schools have broadcasting contracts that showcase their more popular sports—typically football and men's basketball—on network television and in basic cable channels. These contracts can be quite lucrative, particularly for D-I schools from the biggest conferences. For example, the Big Ten conference in 2016 entered into contracts with Fox and ESPN that pay the conference $2.64 billion over six years.

The NCAA also holds certain TV contracts. For example, the NCAA's contract to show the men's basketball championship tournament (widely known as March Madness) is currently under a 14-year deal with CBS and Turner that runs from 2010 to 2024 and pays $11 billion.

For the 2023–24 fiscal year, the conferences that earned the most revenues (and that distributed the most revenues to each of their member schools) were:

1. Big 10: $928 million (dispersed $63.2 million each)
2. SEC: $840 million (dispersed $50.5 million to each of its member schools)
3. Big 12: $558 million (dispersed $34.8 million each)
4. ACC: $487 million (dispersed $28 million each)
5. Pac-12: N/A

U.S. college sports TV rights
Sports rights	Sport	National TV contract	Total Revenues (Per Year)	Ref
NCAA March Madness	Basketball	CBS, TNT	$8.8B ($1.1B)	
College Football Playoff	Football	ESPN	$5.6B ($470m)	
Pac-12 Conference	All	CBS, ESPN, The CW	$3.0B ($250m)	
Big Ten Conference (Big Ten/B1G)	All	Fox, NBC, CBS	$2.6B ($440m)	
Atlantic Coast Conference (ACC)	All	ESPN, The CW	$3.6B ($240m)	
Big 12 Conference	All	Fox, ESPN	$2.6B ($200m)	
Southeastern Conference (SEC)	All	ESPN	$2.6B ($205m)	
American Athletic Conference (Note: Known since July 2025 as the American Conference.)	All	ESPN	$910m ($130m)	
Mountain West Conference (MW)	All	CBS, Fox	$116m ($18m)	
Mid-American Conference (MAC)	All	ESPN	$100m ($8m)	

== Scholarship and roster limits by sport ==
=== Old rules pre–July 1, 2025 ===
Through the 2024–25 academic year, the NCAA had limits on the total financial aid each Division I member could award in each sport that the school sponsors. It divided sports that are sponsored into two types for purposes of scholarship limitations:

- "Head-count" sports, in which the NCAA limits the total number of individuals that can receive athletic scholarships, but allows each player to receive up to a full scholarship.
- "Equivalency" sports, in which the NCAA limits the total financial aid that a school can offer in a given sport to the equivalent of a set number of full scholarships. Roster limitations may or may not apply, depending on the sport.

The term "counter" was also key to this concept. The NCAA defines a "counter" as "an individual who is receiving institutional financial aid that is countable against the aid limitations in a sport."

The number of scholarships that Division I members could award in each sport is listed below. In this table, scholarship numbers for head-count sports are indicated without a decimal point; for equivalency sports, they are listed with a decimal point, with a trailing zero if required.

Sport	Men's	Women's
Acrobatics & tumbling	–	14.0
Baseball	11.7 (Note: This total is also subject to the following restrictions: The number of total counters is limited to 27.; Each counter must receive "athletically related and other countable financial aid" equal to at least 25% of a full scholarship. Most institutional and governmental non-athletic aid falls in the "countable" category; an official NCAA rules interpretation also allows schools to count aid that would otherwise be exempt by NCAA rule (such as purely academic awards) toward the 25% limit, as long as it also is included in the calculations for the team equivalency limit. The 25% rule does not apply to baseball schools that offer only need-based aid (such as Ivy League members). A second exception to the 25% rule, added in 2012, is for players in their final year of athletic eligibility who have not previously received athletically related aid in baseball at any college.)	–
Basketball	13	15
Beach volleyball	–	6.0 (Note: This total is for schools that also sponsor women's indoor volleyball. If a school does not sponsor women's indoor volleyball, it is allowed 8.0 equivalents for beach volleyball. For all schools, the maximum number of counters in beach volleyball is 14.)
Bowling	–	5.0
Cross country/Track and field	12.6 (Note: If a school sponsors men's cross-country but does not sponsor either indoor or outdoor track and field for men, it is allowed 5.0 scholarship equivalents for that sport.)	18.0 (Note: If a school sponsors women's cross-country but does not sponsor either indoor or outdoor track and field for women, it is allowed 6.0 scholarship equivalents for that sport.)
Equestrian	–	15.0
Fencing	4.5	5.0
Field hockey	–	12.0
Football	85 (FBS) (Note: FBS programs are also limited to 25 new counters per school year.); 63.0 (FCS) (Note: FCS programs are also limited to 85 total counters per school year. Effective with the recruiting cycle for the 2018–19 school year, the previous limit of 30 new counters per year for FCS programs has been removed.)	–
Golf	4.5	6.0
Gymnastics	6.3	12
Ice hockey	18.0 (Note: The number of total counters is limited to 30.)	18.0 (Note: The NCAA Division I Manual does not include any scholarship limitations for women's ice hockey. These limitations are instead found in the Division II Manual. The Division II Manual does not include any limit on total counters for any sport, including women's ice hockey.)
Lacrosse	12.6	12.0
Rifle	3.6 (Note: NCAA rifle competition is fully coeducational. For purposes of sports sponsorship, the NCAA classifies teams that include both men and women as men's teams. Of the 33 NCAA rifle schools (23 in Division I, 4 in Division II, and 6 in Division III), 22 field a single coed/mixed team. Six schools (five in Division I and one in Division III) field women-only teams. Schools are also allowed to field any combination of men's, women's, and mixed teams; several NCAA rifle schools field two types of teams, but none currently fields all three types. The scholarship limits are per school, not per team.)	–
Rowing	–	20.0
Rugby	–	12.0
Skiing	6.3	7.0
Soccer	9.9	14.0
Softball	–	12.0
Stunt	–	9.0
Swimming and diving	9.9	14.0
Tennis	4.5	8
Triathlon	–	6.5
Volleyball	4.5	12
Water polo	4.5	8.0
Wrestling	9.9	10.0

=== New rules since July 1, 2025 ===
Following the 2024 settlement of the House v. NCAA legal case, scholarship limits were replaced by roster limits in all sports. These limits, which took effect in 2025–26, apply to members of conferences that were defendants in House (the "Power Four" conferences and the Pac-12 Conference, which had "power" status before its 2024 collapse), plus programs that opted into the House framework.

Student-athletes who had been on NCAA teams before 2025–26 and had athletic eligibility remaining were granted a blanket exemption from roster limits. The NCAA created a database of such individuals, and anyone listed in that database could be on a roster for the remainder of their eligibility without counting against roster limits.

Sport	Men's	Women's
Acrobatics & tumbling	–	55
Baseball	34	–
Basketball	15	15
Beach volleyball	–	19
Bowling	–	11
Cross country	17	17
Equestrian	–	50
Fencing	24	24
Field hockey	–	27
Flag football	–	25 (Note: The NCAA will not enforce this limit until the 2027–28 academic year.)
Football	105	–
Golf	9	9
Gymnastics	20	20
Ice hockey	26	26
Lacrosse	48	38
Rifle	12 (Note: The limit applies to the member institution as a whole, regardless of the number of teams that it fields. Rifle-sponsoring schools are allowed to field separate men's, women's, and coeducational teams; no NCAA rifle school currently fields more than two teams, and most field only one.)	12
Rowing	–	68
Rugby	–	36
Skiing	16	16
Soccer	28	28
Softball	–	25
Stunt	–	65
Swimming and diving	30	30
Tennis	10	10
Track & field (indoor) †	45	45
Track & field (outdoor) †	45	45
Triathlon	–	14
Volleyball	18	18
Water polo	24	24
Wrestling	30	30

† = While Track & Field (indoor) and Track & Field (outdoor) are considered to be two distinct sports, the new NCAA scholarship rules lists only Track & Field with roster limits of 45 for men and 45 for women. The old rules had one scholarship limit for Track & Field and Cross Country combined; 12.6 for men and 18 for women.

=== Rules for multi-sport athletes ===
The NCAA also has rules specifying the sport in which multi-sport athletes are to be counted, with the basic rules being:

- Anyone who participates in football is counted in that sport, even if he does not receive financial aid from the football program. An exception exists for players at non-scholarship FCS programs who receive aid in another sport.
- Participants in basketball are counted in that sport, unless they also play football.
- Participants in men's ice hockey are counted in that sport, unless they also play football or basketball.
- Participants in both men's swimming and diving and men's water polo are counted in swimming and diving, unless they count in football or basketball.
- Participants in women's (indoor) volleyball are counted in that sport unless they also play basketball.
- All other multi-sport athletes are counted in whichever sport the school chooses.

== Football subdivisions ==
Subdivisions in Division I exist only in football. In all other sports, all Division I conferences are equivalent. The subdivisions were recently given names to reflect the differing levels of football play in them.

As of the 2023 season, the main distinctions between Bowl Subdivision and Championship Subdivision schools are scholarship policies and the existence of an official NCAA championship in the latter subdivision. Before the 2023 season, the NCAA required that FBS schools average at least 15,000 attendance, allowing schools to report either total tickets sold or the number of persons in attendance at the games. The requirement was a minimum average of 15,000 people in attendance every other year. These numbers are posted to the NCAA statistics website for football each year. With new rules starting in the 2006 season, it was possible for the number of Bowl Subdivision schools to drop in the future if those schools were not able to pull in enough fans into the games. Additionally, 14 FCS schools had enough attendance to be moved up in 2012. Under current NCAA rules, these schools must have an invitation from an FBS conference in order to move to FBS. The difference in the postseasons in each of the subdivisions grant the FCS an advantage to have the best record in college football history, 17–0, while the FBS allows a 16–0 record with the playoff expansion in the 2024 season.

FBS attendance requirements were abolished early in the 2023 season, effective immediately. In their place, Division I added new requirements for athletic funding. Effective in 2027–28, FBS schools must fund the equivalent of at least 210 full scholarships across all of their NCAA sports; spend at least $6 million annually on athletic scholarships; and provide at least 90% of the total number of allowed scholarship equivalents across 16 sports, including football.

=== Football Bowl Subdivision ===
Division I Football Bowl Subdivision (FBS), formerly known as Division I-A, is the top level of college football. Schools in Division I FBS compete in post-season bowl games, with the champions of five conferences, along with the highest-ranked champion of the other five conferences, receiving automatic bids to the access bowls.

Before the House settlement, FBS schools were limited to a total of 85 football players receiving financial assistance. For competitive reasons, a student receiving partial scholarship counted fully against the total of 85. Nearly all FBS schools that are not on NCAA probation gave 85 full scholarships. The House settlement replaced the 85-scholarship limit with a 105-player roster limit.

As of the current 2026 college football season, there are 136 full members of Division I FBS, plus two transitional schools that are considered FBS members for scheduling purposes. The newest full FBS members are Delaware and Missouri State, which completed transitions from FCS prior to the 2026 season. The next schools to become full FBS members are North Dakota State and Sacramento State, which respectively joined the Mountain West Conference and Mid-American Conference as football-only members in 2026 and become full FBS members in 2028.

Since the 2016 season, all FBS conferences have been allowed to conduct a championship game that does not count against the limit of 12 regular-season contests. Under the current rules, most recently changed in advance of the 2022 season, conferences have complete freedom to determine the participants in their championship games. From 2016 to 2021, FBS rules allowed such a game to be held either (1) between the winners of each of two divisions, with each team having played a full round-robin schedule within its division, or (2) between the conference's top two teams after a full round-robin conference schedule. Before 2016, "exempt" championship games could only be held between the divisional winners of conferences that had at least 12 football teams and split into divisions. The prize is normally a specific bowl game bid for which the conference has a tie-in.

Some conferences have numbers in their names but this often has no relation to the number of member institutions in the conference. The Big Ten Conference did not formally adopt the "Big Ten" name until 1987, but unofficially used that name when it had 10 members from 1917 to 1946, and again from 1949 forward. However, it has continued to use the name even after it expanded to 11 members with the addition of Penn State in 1990, 12 with the addition of Nebraska in 2011, and 14 with the arrival of Maryland and Rutgers in 2014. The Big 12 Conference was established in 1996 with 12 members, but continues to use that name even after a number of departures and a few replacements left the conference with 10 members, and later expansions brought the membership totals to 14 in 2023 and 16 effective in 2024. On the other hand, the Pac-12 Conference used names (official or unofficial) that have reflected the number of members from the establishment of its current charter in 1959 until its collapse in 2024. The conference unofficially used "Big Five" (1959–62), "Big Six" (1962–64), and "Pacific-8" (1964–68) before officially adopting the "Pacific-8" name. The name duly changed to "Pacific-10" in 1978 with the addition of Arizona and Arizona State, and "Pac-12" (instead of "Pacific-12") in 2011 when Colorado and Utah joined. Conferences also tend to ignore their regional names when adding new schools. For example, the Pac-8/10/12 retained its "Pacific" moniker even though its four most recent additions (Arizona, Arizona State, Colorado, Utah) are located in the inland West, and the original Big East kept its name even after adding schools (either in all sports or for football only) located in areas traditionally considered to be in the Midwest (Cincinnati, DePaul, Marquette, Notre Dame), Upper South (Louisville, Memphis) and Southwest (Houston, SMU). The non-football conference that assumed the Big East name when the original Big East split in 2013 is another example of this phenomenon, as half of its 10 inaugural schools (Butler, Creighton, DePaul, Marquette, Xavier) are traditionally regarded as being Midwestern. An even more extrema example of this phenomenon is the Atlantic Coast Conference. For the first 60 years after its 1953 founding, the ACC consisted entirely of schools in Atlantic Coast states. However, in 2013, the conference added three new schools, two of which (Pittsburgh and, for non-football sports, Indiana-based Notre Dame) were in states without an Atlantic shoreline. The following year saw the ACC add another non-Atlantic school in Louisville. Then, in 2023, the conference announced it would expand in 2024 to the Pacific coast with San Francisco Bay Area rivals California and Stanford, and also add SMU from Dallas–Fort Worth.

==== Conferences ====
Conference	Nickname	Founded	Members	Sports	Headquarters
American Conference ***	American	2013 (Note: The conference was founded in 1979 as the original Big East Conference. It renamed itself the American Athletic Conference following a 2013 split along football lines. The non-FBS schools of the original conference left to form a new conference that purchased the Big East name, while the FBS schools continued to operate under the old Big East's charter and structure. The American also inherited the old Big East's Bowl Championship Series berth for the 2013 season, the last for the BCS. The conference dropped the word "Athletic" from its name in July 2025.)	13 (Note: 13 full members and 14 football members, with Wichita State as the only non-football member and Army and Navy as football-only members.: 14 full members and 15 football members no later than 2028 with elevation of current associate James Madison to full membership.) (Note: In addition to the full members and football-only members Army and Navy, five other schools have single-sport associate membership, and two are members in two sports.: FIU is a member in both men's soccer and women's swimming & diving.; James Madison is a member in women's lacrosse and women's swimming & diving.; Liberty and Marshall are members in women's swimming & diving.; Missouri State is a member in men's soccer.; Old Dominion and Vanderbilt are members in women's lacrosse.)	21	Irving, Texas
Atlantic Coast Conference **	ACC	1953	18 (Note: Notre Dame is a full member except in football, in which it remains independent. It has committed to play at least five games each season against ACC opponents, and to play each other ACC member at least once every three years.)	28	Charlotte, North Carolina
Big Ten Conference **	Big Ten, B1G	1896	18 (Note: In addition to the full members, two schools have affiliate membership: Johns Hopkins, otherwise a Division III member, is an affiliate in both men's and women's lacrosse, sports in which the school fields Division I teams.; Notre Dame is a men's hockey affiliate.)	28	Rosemont, Illinois
Big 12 Conference **	Big 12	1996	16 (Note: In addition to the full members, the Big 12 has 15 members that participate in only one sport.: Missouri, Northern Iowa, Oklahoma, Utah Valley, and Wyoming compete in men's wrestling.; Boise State, Florida State, and South Carolina compete in women's beach volleyball.; Denver competes in women's gymnastics.; Florida, San Diego State, and UC Davis compete in women's lacrosse.; Fresno State competes in women's equestrian.; Old Dominion and Tulsa compete in women's rowing.)	25	Irving, Texas
Conference USA ***	CUSA	1995 (Note: The conference was founded in 1995, with football competition starting in 1996.)	10 (Note: In addition to the full members, Conference USA features 11 schools that play one sport in the conference, plus one school that is a member in two sports.: Arkansas State, Nebraska, Sacred Heart, Valparaiso, Vanderbilt, Wichita State, Wright State, and Youngstown State are members in bowling.; Florida Atlantic, South Florida, and UAB are members in beach volleyball.; Tulane is a member in beach volleyball and bowling.)	19	Dallas, Texas
Division I FBS Independents (Note: "Independents" is not a conference; it is simply a designation used for schools whose football programs do not play in any conference. Both of these schools have conference memberships for other sports.)			2		
Mid-American Conference ***	MAC	1946	12 (Note: 12 members and 13 football members with Sacramento State as a football-only member.) (Note: In addition to the 12 full members and football affiliate Sacramento State, the Mid-American Conference features 20 members that participate in a single sport.: Appalachian State, Bellarmine, James Madison, and Longwood compete in women's field hockey.; Delaware, High Point, and Temple compete in women's rowing.; Detroit Mercy, Robert Morris, and Youngstown State compete in women's lacrosse.; Seven schools are men's wrestling affiliates: full Division I members George Mason, Rider, and SIU Edwardsville, plus four Division II members that compete in D-I wrestling, namely Bloomsburg, Clarion, Edinboro, and Lock Haven.; Drake, Omaha, and UIC are members in men's tennis.)	23	Cleveland, Ohio
Mountain West Conference ***	MW	1999	10 (Note: Grand Canyon is a full member without football; UC Davis is a full member that continues to play FCS football; and North Dakota State and Northern Illinois are football members, with Northern Illinois also a member in women's gymnastics.) (Note: In addition to the 12 full members and football affiliates North Dakota State and Northern Illinois: Colorado College, a Division III school with a Division I men's ice hockey team, plays Division I women's soccer in the MW.; Utah Tech is a member in baseball and men's soccer.)	21	Las Vegas, Nevada
Pac-12 Conference	Pac-12	1915 (Note: The charter of the Pac-12 dates only to the formation of the Athletic Association of Western Universities (AAWU) in 1959. However, the Pac-12 claims the history of the Pacific Coast Conference, which was founded in 1915 and began competition in 1916, as its own. Of the nine members of the PCC at the time of its demise in June 1959, only Idaho never joined the Pac-12. The PCC's berth in the Rose Bowl passed to the AAWU.)	9 (Note: 9 full members and 8 football members; Gonzaga has not played football since 1941.) (Note: The Pac-12 also includes 13 associate members that compete in at least one sport.: Air Force, Bakersfield, Cal Poly, Little Rock, North Dakota State, Northern Colorado, Northern Illinois, and South Dakota State compete in men's wrestling.; Cal Baptist, Cal Poly, UC Riverside, and UC San Diego compete in men's soccer.; Dallas Baptist, otherwise a Division II member, plays Division I baseball as a Pac-12 affiliate.; Southern Utah is a women's gymnastics member.)	20	San Ramon, California
Southeastern Conference **	SEC	1932	16	22	Birmingham, Alabama
Sun Belt Conference ***	Sun Belt, SBC	1976	14 (Note: 13 members no later than 2028 with loss of James Madison.) (Note: In addition to the full members, seven schools are affiliate members: Charleston, Mercer, and UNCW compete in beach volleyball.; Kentucky, South Carolina, UCF, and West Virginia compete in men's soccer.)	20	New Orleans, Louisiana

**: "Big Four" or "Power Four" conferences that had guaranteed berths in the "access bowls" associated with the College Football Playoff before its 2024 expansion to 12 teams
***: "Group of Six" conferences

=== Football Championship Subdivision ===
The Division I Football Championship Subdivision (FCS), formerly known as Division I-AA, consists of 130 teams as of the 2022 season, with all participating in one of 14 conferences. The "I-AA" designation was dropped by the NCAA in 2006, although it is still informally and commonly used. FCS teams are limited to 63 players on scholarship (compared to 85 for FBS teams) and, through the 2025 season, usually play an 11-game schedule (compared to 12 games for FBS teams). The FCS regular-season schedule will permanently expand to 12 games, matching FBS, in 2026. The FCS determines its national champion through an NCAA-sanctioned single-elimination bracket tournament, culminating in a title game, the NCAA Division I Football Championship. As of the 2018 season, the tournament begins with 24 teams; 10 conference champions that received automatic bids, and 14 teams selected at-large by a selection committee.

The postseason tournament traditionally begins on Thanksgiving weekend in late November. When I-AA was formed 48 years ago in 1978, the playoffs included just four teams for its first three seasons, doubling to eight teams for one season in 1981. From 1982 to 1985, there was a 12-team tournament; this expanded to 16 teams in 1986. The playoffs expanded to 20 teams starting in 2010, then grew to 24 teams in 2013. Since the 2010 season, the title game has been held in early January. The 2010 season was the first of a 15-year run for the title game at Toyota Stadium in Frisco, Texas. Due to renovations planned for that stadium, the title game has moved to FirstBank Stadium on the campus of Vanderbilt University in Nashville, Tennessee for at least the 2025 and 2026 seasons. From 1997 through 2009, the title game was played in December in Chattanooga, Tennessee, preceded by five seasons in Huntington, West Virginia.

==== Abstainers ====
The Football Championship Subdivision includes several conferences which do not participate in the eponymous post-season championship tournament.

The Southwestern Athletic Conference (SWAC) has its own championship game in mid-December between the champions of its East and West divisions. Also, three of its member schools traditionally do not finish their regular seasons until Thanksgiving weekend. Grambling State and Southern play each other in the Bayou Classic, and Alabama State plays Tuskegee (of Division II) in the Turkey Day Classic. SWAC teams are eligible to accept at-large bids if their schedule is not in conflict. The last SWAC team to participate in the I-AA playoffs was Jackson State in 1997; the SWAC never achieved success in the tournament, going winless in 19 games in twenty years (1978–97). It had greater success outside the conference while in Division II and the preceding College Division.

From 2006 through 2009, the Pioneer Football League and Northeast Conference champions played in the Gridiron Classic. If a league champion was invited to the national championship playoff as an at-large bid (something the Pioneer league, at least, never received), the second-place team would play in the Gridiron Classic. That game was scrapped after the 2009 season when its four-year contract ran out; this coincided with the NCAA's announcement that the Northeast Conference would receive an automatic bid to the tournament starting in 2010. The Big South Conference also received an automatic bid in the same season. The Pioneer Football League earned an automatic bid beginning in 2013.

The Mid-Eastern Athletic Conference (MEAC) began abstaining from the playoffs with the 2015 season. Like the SWAC, its members are eligible for at-large bids, and the two conferences have faced off in the Celebration Bowl as an alternative postseason game since the 2015 season.

Before the 2025 season, the Ivy League, which had been reclassified to I-AA (FCS) following the 1981 season, did not participate in the I-AA/FCS playoffs despite having an automatic bid, citing academic concerns. The conference still plays a strict ten-game schedule, despite the allowed FCS schedule having been 11 games (and 12 in some seasons) from the creation of the subdivision through the 2025 season, and having permanently expanded to 12 games in 2026. The Ivy League had allowed postseason play in all other sports. The last Ivy League member to play in a bowl game was Columbia in the 1934 Rose Bowl. In December 2024, the Ivies abandoned their longstanding ban on football postseason play, and the conference would participate in the FCS playoffs from 2025 on.

Schools in a transition period after joining the FCS from a lower division (or from the NAIA) are also ineligible for the playoffs.

==== Scholarships ====
Before the House settlement took full effect, Division I FCS schools were restricted to giving financial assistance amounting to 63 full scholarships. As FCS football was an "equivalency" sport (as opposed to the "head-count" status of FBS football at the time), Championship Subdivision schools could divide their allotment into partial scholarships. However, FCS schools could only have 85 players receiving any sort of athletic financial aid for football—the same numeric limit as FBS schools. Because of competitive forces, however, a substantial number of players in Championship Subdivision programs are on full scholarships. A former difference was that FCS schools had a limit of 30 players that could be provided with financial aid in a given season, while FBS schools were limited to 25 such additions per season. These limits were suspended in 2020 before being completely eliminated for both subdivisions in 2023. Finally, before House, FCS schools were limited to 95 individuals participating in preseason practices, as opposed to 105 at FBS schools (the three service academies that play FBS football are exempt from preseason practice player limits by NCAA rule). In the post-House era, FCS and FBS programs that opted into the settlement have the same roster limit of 105

A few Championship Subdivision conferences are composed of schools that offer no athletic scholarships at all, most notably the Ivy League and the Pioneer Football League (PFL), a football-only conference. The Ivy League allows no athletic scholarships at all, while the PFL consists of schools that offer scholarships in other sports but choose not to take on the expense of a scholarship football program. The Northeast Conference, now officially known as the NEC, also sponsored non-scholarship football, but began offering a maximum of 30 full scholarship equivalents in 2006, which grew to 40 in 2011 after a later vote of the league's school presidents and athletic directors and has since increased to 45. The Patriot League only began awarding football scholarships in the 2013 season, with the first scholarships awarded only to incoming freshmen. Before the conference began its transition to scholarship football, athletes receiving scholarships in other sports were ineligible to play football for member schools. Since the completion of the transition with the 2016 season, member schools have been allowed up to 60 full scholarship equivalents.

==== Conferences ====
Conference	Nickname	Founded	Members	Sports	Headquarters	FCS Tournament Bid
Big Sky Conference	Big Sky	1963	12 (Note: 12 full members and 13 football members. Cal Poly, a full member of the non-football Big West Conference, and UC Davis, a full member of the FBS Mountain West Conference, are football-only affiliates.: In addition to these schools, Francis Marion, a Division II member that competes in Division I men's golf, is an associate member in that sport.)	16	Ogden, Utah	Automatic
Coastal Athletic Association	CAA	1983 (Note: The CAA football conference, branded as CAA Football and legally a separate entity from the all-sports CAA, was only founded in 2007, but has a continuous history dating to the late 1930s (although not under the same charter): The New England Conference was formed by five New England state universities, plus one private university in that region (Northeastern), in 1938. However, the CAA does not consider this conference to be a part of the history of CAA Football. Four of the public schools—Maine, UMass, New Hampshire, and Rhode Island—were in the CAA football conference through the 2011 season. However, UMass football left for the MAC in 2012. URI football initially planned to leave for the Northeast Conference in 2013, but decided to remain in the CAA.; In 1946, the four then-remaining members of the New England Conference affiliated with two other schools to form the Yankee Conference under a separate charter, with athletic competition starting in 1947. The CAA considers its football history to have started with the formation of the Yankee Conference.; In 1997, the Yankee Conference was absorbed by the Atlantic 10 Conference. The A-10 inherited the Yankee Conference's automatic berth in the Division I-AA (now FCS) playoffs. In addition to the four charter New England Conference members mentioned above, five other members of the Yankee Conference at the time of the A-10 merger are still in CAA Football.; After the 2006 season, all of the A-10 football teams left for the new CAA football conference. CAA Football inherited the A-10's automatic berth in the FCS playoffs.)	13 (Note: 14 full members in 2027 with addition of non-football Fairfield.) (Note: Of the 13 full members of the multi-sports CAA, seven compete in CAA Football. Currently, six associate members fill out the ranks of CAA Football: Albany, Bryant, Maine, New Hampshire, Rhode Island, and Sacred Heart. Bryant is also an associate of the multi-sports CAA in women's rowing. One full member of the multi-sports CAA, William & Mary, houses football in the Patriot League.) (Note: In addition to the CAA Football members, the CAA has three associate members that each participate in at least one sport.: Albany and UConn compete in women's rowing.; Future full member Fairfield competes in field hockey and men's lacrosse.)	21 (Note: 21 sports under CAA administration, with the all-sports CAA also governing CAA Football.)	Richmond, Virginia	Automatic
Division I FCS Independents (Note: "Independents" is not a conference; it is simply a designation used for schools whose football programs do not play in any conference. All of these schools have conference memberships for other sports.)			2 (Note: Chicago State and Merrimack.: 1 member in 2027, when Chicago State football joins the rest of the school's athletic program in the NEC.)			
Ivy League	Ivy League	1954 (Note: Although the conference considers 1954 to be its founding date, the athletic league's origins go back to the turn of the 20th century.: The Ivy League considers the Eastern Intercollegiate Basketball League (EIBL), a men's basketball-only conference founded in 1901, as part of its history. Every school that had been an EIBL member would become part of the Ivy League.; In 1945, the eight schools that would eventually form the athletic Ivy League entered into the Ivy Group Agreement, which governed football competition between the schools. The original agreement was renewed in 1952.; The official founding date of 1954 reflects the extension of the Ivy Group Agreement to all sports. As part of the agreement, Brown, the only one of the original Ivy Group that had not joined the EIBL, did so. All-sports competition began in 1955, with the EIBL directly absorbed into the new league.)	8	33 (Note: This is the number of sports in which the Ivy League awards men's and women's team championships. However: Championships are awarded in three non-NCAA sports (men's rowing plus men's and women's squash).; No conference championship tournament is held in men's or women's ice hockey; all Ivy members that sponsor varsity ice hockey compete in ECAC Hockey for that conference's automatic NCAA tournament bids.)	Princeton, New Jersey	Automatic (Note: The Ivy League did not participate in the FCS playoffs until 2025.)
Mid-Eastern Athletic Conference	MEAC	1970	8 (Note: The football conference currently consists of 6 of the 8 member schools.) (Note: In addition to the full members: Gardner–Webb and Mississippi Valley State participate in women's flag football.; North Carolina A&T and UAB participate in women's bowling.)	16	Norfolk, Virginia	Abstains
Missouri Valley Football Conference	MVFC	1985 (Note: The football conference dates to 1985, but the conference charter was established in 1982. See History of the Missouri Valley Football Conference for more details.)	9	1	St. Louis, Missouri	Automatic
NEC	NEC	1981	9 (Note: 9 full members and 8 football members. Fairleigh Dickinson and Le Moyne do not sponsor football, and Chicago State is playing its first football season in 2026 as an FCS independent. Two full members of non-football conferences, Duquesne (Atlantic 10) and Robert Morris (Horizon League), are football associates. Both are NEC associates in a second sport, Duquesne in bowling and Robert Morris in men's lacrosse.: 8 full members and 9 football members in 2027 with loss of non-football Le Moyne, plus Chicago State joining NEC football.) (Note: In addition to Duquesne and Robert Morris, the NEC has 19 other associate members that participate in one or more sports.: Binghamton is an associate in men's golf, plus men's and women's tennis.; Cleveland State, Detroit Mercy, and VMI are men's lacrosse associates. VMI is also an associate in men's and women's swimming & diving.; Coppin State and Norfolk State are associates only in baseball.; Daemen and D'Youville, both Division II members, are associates in men's volleyball, a sport with a combined D-I and D-II championship. Division I members Manhattan and Merrimack are also men's volleyball members.; Delaware State competes in baseball, women's lacrosse, and women's soccer.; Fairfield, Rider, and Quinnipiac are field hockey associates.; Howard competes in men's golf, women's lacrosse, men's and women's soccer, and men's and women's swimming & diving.; Maryland Eastern Shore competes in baseball, men's golf, and men's volleyball.; Merrimack and Sacred Heart compete in field hockey.; Monmouth and Niagara compete in bowling.; North Carolina Central is an associate in men's golf.)	25	Somerset, New Jersey	Automatic
Ohio Valley Conference	OVC	1948	9 (Note: 9 full members, 8 football members. Morehead State plays non-scholarship football in the Pioneer Football League, while SIU Edwardsville and Southern Indiana do not sponsor football. Charleston Southern and Gardner–Webb are football associates.) (Note: In addition to the full members and football associates: Bryant is an associate in men's and women's golf, plus women's tennis.; Houston Christian, Incarnate Word, and UTRGV are associates in men's soccer.; Murray State ia an associate in rifle.)	20	Brentwood, Tennessee	Automatic
Patriot League	Patriot	1986 (Note: The Patriot League was founded as the football-only Colonial League in 1986. In 1990, it became an all-sports conference and adopted its current name.)	10 (Note: Five of the full members do not sponsor FCS football. American, Boston University and Loyola (Maryland) do not sponsor football at all, and Army and Navy play in the FBS American Conference. Fordham, Georgetown, Richmond, Villanova, and William & Mary are associate members in football. Georgetown is also an associate in women's rowing.) (Note: In addition to the football associates, MIT, otherwise a Division III institution, is an associate in women's rowing.)	23	Center Valley, Pennsylvania	Automatic
Pioneer Football League	PFL	1991	11	1	St. Louis, Missouri	Automatic
Southern Conference	SoCon	1921	11 (Note: 11 full members, 10 football members.) (Note: In addition to the full members, the SoCon currently has 10 associate members, each of which plays one sport in the conference.: Appalachian State, Bellarmine, Campbell, Davidson, Gardner–Webb, and Presbyterian are members in men's wrestling.; Liberty plays men's soccer.; Georgia Southern, North Georgia (a Division II institution), and UAB are members in rifle, a sport with a single national championship for all divisions.)	20	Spartanburg, South Carolina	Automatic
Southland Conference	SLC	1963	12 (Note: The football conference currently consists of 10 of the 12 member schools.)	18	Frisco, Texas	Automatic
Southwestern Athletic Conference	SWAC	1920	12	18	Birmingham, Alabama	Abstains
United Athletic Conference	UAC, The United	1962 (Note: The current United Athletic Conference is the continuation of the Western Athletic Conference, which operated under that name from 1962 to 2026.)	9 (Note: 9 full members and 8 football members. Little Rock and UT Arlington do not sponsor football, and West Florida is a football associate.)	17	Jacksonville, Florida (Note: Headquarters of Unisun Sports, a joint venture between the UAC and Atlantic Sun Conference that provides the administrative structure for both leagues.)	Automatic

=== Division I non-football schools ===
Several Bowl Subdivision and Championship Subdivision conferences have member institutions that do not compete in football. Such schools are sometimes unofficially referred to as I-AAA.

The following non-football conferences have full members that sponsor football:

- The America East Conference has four football-sponsoring schools: Albany, Bryant, Maine, and New Hampshire. All play in CAA Football, the technically separate football league of the Coastal Athletic Association (CAA).
- The Atlantic Sun Conference (ASUN) has three football-sponsoring schools:
  - Stetson plays in the PFL.
  - West Florida plays in the United Athletic Conference.
  - Bellarmine does not play NCAA football, instead playing the weight-restricted and non-NCAA variant of sprint football.
- The Atlantic 10 Conference has six football-sponsoring members:
  - Davidson and Dayton play in the PFL.
  - Duquesne plays in the NEC (historically the Northeast Conference).
  - Fordham and Richmond play in the Patriot League.
  - Rhode Island plays in CAA Football.
- The current Big East Conference has four football-sponsoring schools. Three play in FCS: Butler in the PFL, plus Georgetown and Villanova in the Patriot League. The fourth, UConn, plays as an FBS independent.
- The Big South Conference has three football-sponsoring members.
  - Charleston Southern and Gardner–Webb play in the Ohio Valley Conference. Both had played football in the OVC–Big South Football Association, an alliance between the Big South and OVC, from 2023–2025. In June 2026, the two conferences agreed that the alliance would be incorporated into the OVC under that conference's banner.
  - Presbyterian plays in the PFL.
- Two Big West Conference members have football programs. Cal Poly plays FCS football in the Big Sky Conference, and Sacramento State plays FBS football in the Mid-American Conference.
- The Horizon League has three football schools. Northern Illinois plays FBS football in the Mountain West Conference (MW), Robert Morris plays in the NEC, and Youngstown State plays in the Missouri Valley Football Conference (MVFC).
- The Metro Conference has three football schools. Marist plays in the PFL, Merrimack is an FCS independent, and Sacred Heart plays in CAA Football.
- The Missouri Valley Conference has seven football schools: Drake, Illinois State, Indiana State, Murray State, Northern Iowa, Southern Illinois and Valparaiso. Drake and Valparaiso play in the PFL; all others compete in the MVFC (a separate legal entity from the MVC, despite the similar name).
- The Summit League has five football schools, three of which play in the MVFC: North Dakota, South Dakota, and South Dakota State. St. Thomas of Minnesota plays in the PFL. North Dakota State plays FBS football in the MW.
- The West Coast Conference's (WCC) only football school, San Diego, plays in the PFL.

The following Division I conferences do not sponsor football. These conferences still compete in Division I for all sports that they sponsor.

==== Conferences ====
Conference	Nickname	Founded	Members	Sports	Headquarters
America East Conference	America East	1979	9	18	Boston, Massachusetts
Atlantic Sun Conference	ASUN	1978	8 (Note: In addition to the full members, 22 schools are associates in at least one sport.: Abilene Christian, North Alabama, and UT Arlington compete in men's tennis.; Air Force, Mercer, and Utah play men's lacrosse.; Austin Peay, Central Arkansas, Eastern Kentucky, North Alabama, Tarleton State, and West Georgia participate in beach volleyball.; Austin Peay, Coastal Carolina, Delaware, Kennesaw State, Liberty, and Lindenwood play women's lacrosse.; Central Arkansas also competes in men's soccer.; Delaware, Gardner–Webb, and Old Dominion participate in both men's and women's swimming & diving.; Florida Atlantic competes in men's swimming & diving only.; Georgia Southern, Little Rock, and UNC Asheville compete in women's swimming & diving only.)	22	Jacksonville, Florida (Note: Headquarters of Unisun Sports, a joint venture between the ASUN and United Athletic Conference that provides the administrative structure for both conferences.)
Atlantic 10 Conference	A-10	1975	14 (Note: In addition to the full members, five schools are single-sport associates: Delaware, High Point, Hobart (a Division III member that plays men's lacrosse in Division I), and UMass compete in men's lacrosse.; Lock Haven, otherwise a Division II institution, competes in field hockey.)	22	Newport News, Virginia
Big East Conference	Big East	1979 (Note: The current Big East was formed in 2013 as a result of the split of the original Big East Conference. The original conference charter was retained by the football-sponsoring schools now known as the American Conference. While both leagues claim 1979 as their founding date, the current Big East maintains the history of the original conference in all sports that it sponsors. The pre-split history of Big East football, sponsored by the American but not the current Big East, is not recognized by either offshoot conference. The same applies to women's rowing, which had once been sponsored by the American but is now not sponsored by either the American or Big East.)	11 (Note: In addition to the full members, the following schools are Big East affiliates in one or more sports: Akron participates in men's soccer.; Liberty, Old Dominion, and Temple participate in field hockey.; Denver participates in men's and women's lacrosse.)	23 (Note: 22 NCAA-sanctioned sports plus the non-NCAA and fully coeducational esports.)	New York City, New York
Big South Conference	Big South	1983	9 (Note: In addition to the full members, the following schools are associate members in at least one sport: Bryant in men's tennis.; Furman, Mercer, and Wofford in women's lacrosse.; NJIT in men's and women's tennis.)	18 (Note: 19 sports in 2027 with addition of women's flag football.)	Charlotte, North Carolina
Big West Conference	Big West; BWC	1969	12 (Note: 10 members in 2027 with loss of UC San Diego and UC Santa Barbara.) (Note: In addition to the full members, Hawaii is an affiliate in beach volleyball, women's swimming & diving, and men's (indoor) volleyball.)	19	Irvine, California
Horizon League	Horizon	1979	12 (Note: In addition to the full members, four schools are Horizon affiliates in men's tennis: Belmont, Oral Roberts, Southern Indiana, and Tennessee State.)	19	Indianapolis, Indiana
Independents (Note: "Independents" is not a conference, it is simply a designation used to indicate schools which are not a member of any conference.)	Independents		0		
Metro Conference	Metro	1980	13 (Note: 13 members in 2027 with loss of Fairfield and addition of Le Moyne.) (Note: In addition to the full members, 10 other schools are Metro affiliates in at least one sport.: Albany in women's golf.; Drake, Robert Morris, and Stetson participate in women's rowing.; La Salle, Villanova, VMI, and Wagner participate in women's water polo.; Jacksonville participates in women's rowing and the non-NCAA sport of men's rowing.; LIU competes in women's rowing and women's water polo.)	25 (Note: 23 NCAA-recognized sports plus two non-NCAA sports, esports (fully coeducational) and men's rowing.)	Edison, New Jersey
Missouri Valley Conference	MVC / Valley	1907	11 (Note: In addition to the full members, six schools house at least one sport in the conference.: Ball State, Miami (OH), and UMass are men's swimming & diving associates.; Bowling Green and Western Michigan are men's soccer associates.; Missouri State is an associate in men's and women's swimming & diving.)	18	St. Louis, Missouri
The Summit League	The Summit	1982	9 (Note: In addition to the full members, three schools are single-sport associates, and two others house two sports in the conference.: Delaware and UMass are men's soccer associates.; Eastern Illinois and Southern Indiana are associates in men's and women's swimming & diving.; Northern Colorado is an associate in baseball.)	19	Sioux Falls, South Dakota
West Coast Conference	WCC	1952	10 (Note: 12 members in 2027 with addition of UC San Diego and return of UC Santa Barbara.) (Note: In addition to the full members, five schools are single-sport WCC associates, and two others are multi-sport associates.: Air Force, San Jose State, and UC Davis in men's water polo.; Augusta, a Division II member that competes in Division I men's and women's golf, is an associate in both sports.; Creighton, Sacramento State, and UC San Diego in women's rowing.; UC Davis also competes in beach volleyball.)	16 (Note: 18 sports in 2027 with addition of men's and women's swimming & diving.)	San Bruno, California

Notes

Of these, the two that most recently sponsored football were the Atlantic 10 and Metro (known before 2026–27 as the Metro Atlantic Athletic Conference, or MAAC). The A-10 football league dissolved in 2006 with its members going to CAA Football, the technically separate football league operated by the all-sports Coastal Athletic Association. In addition, three A-10 schools (Dayton, Duquesne, and Fordham) play football in a conference other CAA Football, which still includes one full-time A-10 member, Rhode Island. The MAAC stopped sponsoring football in 2007, after most of its members gradually stopped fielding teams. Among current Metro members that were in the conference before 2007, only Marist, which plays in the Pioneer Football League, still sponsors football.

From 2013 to 2021, the Western Athletic Conference was a non-football league, having dropped football after a near-complete membership turnover that saw the conference stripped of all but two of its football-sponsoring members. The two remaining football-sponsoring schools, Idaho and New Mexico State, played the 2013 season as FBS independents before becoming football-only members of the Sun Belt Conference in 2014. Both left Sun Belt football in 2018, with Idaho downgrading to FCS status and adding football to its all-sports Big Sky Conference membership and New Mexico State becoming an FBS independent. The WAC added two more football-sponsoring schools with the 2020 arrival of Tarleton State and Utah Tech (then Dixie State) from Division II; both schools planned to be FCS independents for the foreseeable future. The WAC would reinstate football at the FCS level in 2021, coinciding with the arrival of four new members with FCS football; for its first season, it entered into a formal partnership with the ASUN Conference to give it enough playoff-eligible members to receive an automatic playoff berth. This partnership was renewed for the 2022 season, with five ASUN and three WAC schools participating, though each conference would play its own schedule. After the 2022 season, the ASUN and WAC announced a full football merger for 2023 and beyond under the banner of the United Athletic Conference.

In July 2026, the UAC became a multi-sports conference as a rebranding of the WAC. When this change was announced in June 2025, the UAC membership going forward was to consist of the five then-current ASUN members that played UAC football, two football-sponsoring WAC members, and non-football legacy WAC member UT Arlington. Later in 2025, the UAC announced that another non-football school, Little Rock, would join the conference in 2026. At the time of announcement, the reconfigured ASUN was to consist entirely of schools that do not sponsor scholarship FCS football. The ASUN and UAC later announced that Division II upgrader West Florida would become a full ASUN member and football-only UAC member in July 2026.

== Division I in ice hockey ==
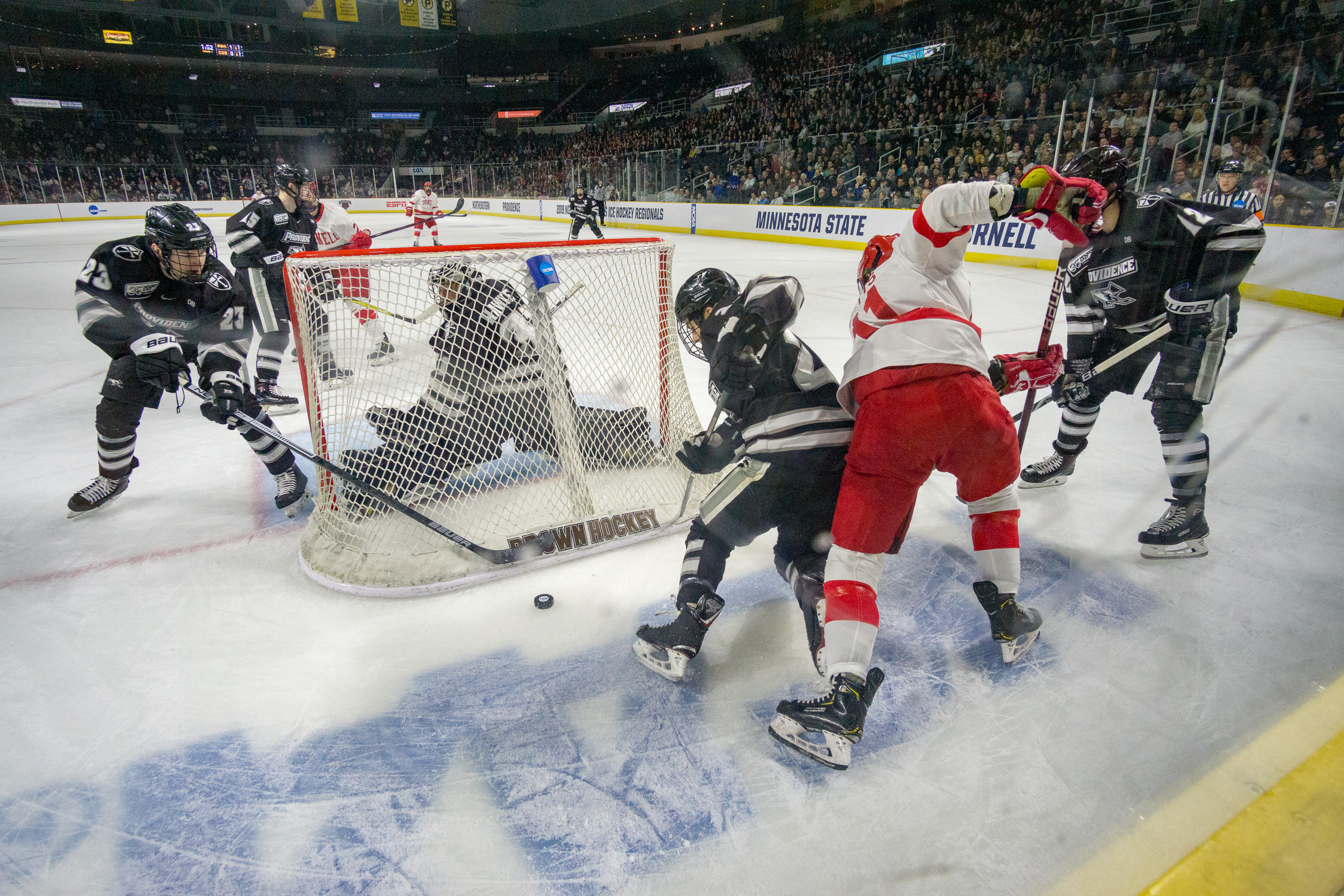
Providence College Friars play Cornell in the NCAA Hockey East Regional at the Dunkin' Donuts Center, April 7, 2019

Some sports, most notably ice hockey and men's volleyball, have completely different conference structures that operate outside of the normal NCAA sports conference structure.

As ice hockey is limited to a much smaller number of almost exclusively Northern schools, there is a completely different conference structure for teams. These conferences feature a mix of teams that play their other sports in various Division I conferences, and even Division II and Division III schools. For most of the early 21st century, there was no correlation between a team's ice hockey affiliation and its affiliation for other sports, with the exception of the Ivy League's hockey-playing schools all being members of the ECAC. For example, before 2013, the Hockey East men's conference consisted of one ACC school, one Big East school, four schools from the America East, one from the A-10, one CAA school, and two schools from the D-II Northeast-10 Conference, while the Central Collegiate Hockey Association (CCHA) and Western Collegiate Hockey Association (WCHA) both had some Big Ten representation, plus Division II and III schools. Also, the divisional structure is truncated, with the Division II championship abolished in 1999.

The Metro Atlantic Athletic Conference ceased its sponsorship of the sport in 2003, with the remaining members forming Atlantic Hockey. For the next decade, no regular all-sport conferences sponsored ice hockey.

Starting with the 2013–14 season, Division I men's hockey experienced a major realignment. The Big Ten Conference began to sponsor ice hockey, and their institutions withdrew their membership from the WCHA and CCHA. Additionally, six other schools from those conferences withdrew to form the new National Collegiate Hockey Conference at the same time. The fallout from these moves led to the demise of the original CCHA, two more teams entering the NCHC, and further membership turnover in the men's side of the WCHA.

Women's hockey was largely unaffected by this realignment. The Big Ten still has only four members with varsity women's hockey (full members Michigan and Michigan State only sponsor men's hockey, as does hockey-only member Notre Dame), with six teams required under conference bylaws for official sponsorship. As a result, the only changes in women's hockey affiliations in the 2010–14 period occurred in College Hockey America, which saw two schools drop the sport and three new members join.

The next significant realignment took place after the 2020–21 season, when seven of the 10 then-current men's members of the WCHA left to form a revived CCHA, which in turn led to the demise of the men's side of the WCHA.

=== Conferences ===
Accurate for the upcoming 2026–27 season.

Conference	Nickname	Founded	Members	Men	Women
Atlantic Hockey America	AHA	2024 (Note: Formally founded in 2024 by the merger of the men-only Atlantic Hockey Association and the women-only College Hockey America. The Association had been founded in 1997 as the men's hockey league of the Metro Atlantic Athletic Conference, separating from the MAAC in 2003. CHA was founded in 1999 as a men-only league, added a women's division in 2002, and shut down its men's division in 2010.)	14	9	7
Big Ten Conference	Big Ten, B1G	1896 (Note: Founded as an all-sports conference in 1896, but did not sponsor ice hockey until 2013–14.)	7	7	0
Central Collegiate Hockey Association	CCHA	1971, 2020 (Note: First version founded in 1971 and disbanded in 2013; reestablished in 2020, with play resuming in 2021–22. The current CCHA considers the original league to be part of its history.)	8	8	0
ECAC Hockey	N/A	1961 (Note: Founded as a men's-only conference in 1961. A women's invitational tournament was first held in 1985; regular-season play began informally in 1988 before becoming officially sponsored in 1992. Originally part of the Eastern College Athletic Conference, but independent of that body since 2004.)	12	12	12
Hockey East	HEA	1984 (Note: Founded as a men's-only conference in 1984, with women's hockey added in 2002.)	12	11	10
Independents	—N/a		5 (Note: Alaska, Alaska Anchorage, Lindenwood, LIU, and Stonehill.: At least 6 independents possible in 2027–28. Maryville (MO) will add men's ice hockey but has not yet announced a conference affiliation. Tennessee State had planned to start men's varsity play in 2026–27, but has delayed the start of play to an indefinite future date.)	5	0
National Collegiate Hockey Conference	NCHC	2011 (Note: Date of founding; play began in 2013–14.)	10	10	0
New England Women's Hockey Alliance	NEWHA	2018 (Note: Founded as a scheduling alliance in 2017; formally organized as a conference in 2018. Received official NCAA recognition in 2019.)	8	0	8
Western Collegiate Hockey Association	WCHA	1951 (Note: Founded as a men's-only conference in 1951, with women's hockey added in 1999. Men's hockey was dropped after the 2020–21 season.)	8	0	8
Total			83	62	45

== Classification debate ==
In the early 21st century, a controversy arose in the NCAA over whether schools will continue to be allowed to have one showcased program in Division I with the remainder of the athletic program in a lower division, as is the case of, notably, Johns Hopkins University lacrosse as well as Colorado College and University of Alabama in Huntsville in ice hockey. This is an especially important issue in hockey, which has no Division II national championship and has several schools whose other athletic programs compete in Division II and Division III.

This controversy was resolved at the 2004 NCAA Convention in Nashville, Tennessee when the members supported Proposal 65–1, the amended legislation co-sponsored by Colorado College, Clarkson University, Hartwick College, the Johns Hopkins University, Rensselaer Polytechnic Institute, Rutgers University–Newark, St. Lawrence University, and SUNY Oneonta. Each school affected by this debate is allowed to grant financial aid to student-athletes who compete in Division I programs in one men's sport and one women's sport. It is still permitted for other schools to place one men's and one women's sport in Division I going forward, but they cannot offer scholarships without bringing the whole program into compliance with Division I rules. In addition, schools in Divisions II and III are allowed to "play up" in any sport that does not have a championship for the school's own division, but only Division II programs and any Division III programs covered by the exemption can offer scholarships in those sports.

Five Division I programs at "waiver schools" were grandfathered with the passing of Proposal 65-1:

- Clarkson University: men's and women's ice hockey
- Colorado College: men's ice hockey, women's soccer
- Johns Hopkins University: men's and women's lacrosse
- Rensselaer Polytechnic Institute: men's ice hockey (women's ice hockey moved up to Division I in 2005)
- St. Lawrence University: men's and women's ice hockey

An additional three programs were grandfathered in Proposal 65-1 but no longer are sponsored in Division I:

- Hartwick College: men's soccer, women's water polo (men's soccer dropped to Division III in 2018, with women's water polo discontinued at the same time)
- Rutgers University–Newark: men's volleyball (dropped to Division III in 2014)
- SUNY Oneonta: men's soccer (dropped to Division III in 2006)

== See also ==
- List of NCAA Division I institutions
- List of NCAA Division I athletic directors
- List of current NCAA Division I champions
- List of NCAA Divisions II and III schools competing in NCAA Division I sports
- List of schools reclassifying their athletic programs to NCAA Division I
- Progress toward degree
