= 2016–17 Sacred Heart Pioneers women's ice hockey season =

Doubletree Hockey Classic Champions
- Conference: Division I Independent
- Home ice: Sports Center of Connecticut

Record
- Overall: 18-9-2
- Home: 8-4-1
- Road: 9-5-1
- Neutral: 1-0-0

Coaches and captains
- Head coach: Thomas O'Malley
- Assistant coaches: Katherine Pauletti

The 2016-17 Pioneers represented Sacred Heart University as a Division I independent team during the 2016-17 NCAA Division I women's ice hockey season.

== Roster ==
=== 2016–17 Pioneers ===
No.	Nat.	Player	Class	Pos	Height	DoB	Hometown	Previous team
1		Sarah Erban	Sophomore	G			Attleboro, Massachusetts	Tilton School
2		Brooke McGreen	Sophomore	F			Narragansett, Rhode Island	Narragansett HS
3		Victoria Grimmer	Freshman	F			Reading, Massachusetts	Reading HS
4		Lilly Cleary	Sophomore	F			Norwell, Massachusetts	Norwell HS
5		Haley Payne	Sophomore	F			Braintree, Massachusetts	Braintree HS
6		Cassandra Hanlon	Junior	D			Rowley, Massachusetts	Governor's Academy
7		Elizabeth Johnson	Senior	D	5' 5" (1.65 m)		Milton, Massachusetts	Milton HS
8		Theresa Hulse	Freshman	F/D			Mantoloking, New Jersey	Point Pleasant Beach HS
9		Brittany Smith	Junior	F			Manchester, Massachusetts	Marblehead HS
10		Olivia Bryant	Freshman	D			Lexington, Massachusetts	Lexington HS
11		Taylor Moreland	Junior	F			Pleasant Prairie, Wisconsin	Milwaukee Jr. Admirals
12		Amie Varano	Senior	D	5' 5" (1.65 m)		Duxbury, Massachusetts	Notre Dame Academy
13		Megan Finlay	Senior	F	5' 8" (1.73 m)		Cumberland, Maine	Greely HS
15		Julia Consorti	Senior	F	5' 5" (1.65 m)		West Haven, Connecticut	West Haven HS
16		Savannah Hersey	Sophomore	D			Warwick, Rhode Island	Warwick Veterans Memorial HS
17		Katie Stueve	Sophomore	F			Chester Springs, Pennsylvania	Downington East HS
18		Meghan Kebalka	Junior	F			Lebanon, New Hampshire	University of New Hampshire
20		Maddie Bishop	Freshman	F			Wethersfield, Connecticut	East Catholic HS
21		Teagan Ketchum	Senior	D	5' 4" (1.63 m)		Averill Park, New York	Albany Academy
22		Elizabeth Collins	Junior	F			Duxbury, Massachusetts	Duxbury HS
23		Hannah Sullivan	Sophomore	F			Woburn, Massachusetts	Woburn HS
24		Jayne Lewis	Freshman	F			Troy, Illinois	New Hampton School
26		Sarah Walewski	Senior	F	5' 5" (1.65 m)		Shelton, Connecticut	St. Joseph Academy
27		Carley Radovich	Junior	F			Milford, Massachusetts	Vermont Academy
29		Kathryn Darling	Junior	F			Vestal, New York	Nichols School
30		Devan Kane	Junior	G	8' 1" (2.46 m)		cumminScarborough, Maine	Scarborough HS

== Schedule ==
Date	Opponent^{#}	Rank^{#}	Site	Decision	Result	Record
Regular Season
October 21	at Brown*		Meehan Auditorium • Providence, RI	Devan Kane	L 3–6	0–1–0
October 22	at Brown*		Meehan Auditorium • Providence, RI	Devan Kane	L 0–7	0–2–0
October 28	Holy Cross*		Sports Center of Connecticut • Shelton, CT	Devan Kane	L 1–3	0–3–0
October 29	at Holy Cross*		Hart Center • Worcester, MA	Devan Kane	L 2–3	0–4–0
November 4	at Lebanon Valley*		Hersheypark Arena • Hershey, PA	Sarah Erban	W 5–0	1–4–0
November 5	at Lebanon Valley*		Hersheypark Arena • Hershey, PA	Jadeyn Kastning	W 11–1	2–4–0
November 12	at Saint Anselm*		Sullivan Ice Arena • Goffstown, NH	Devan Kane	L 1–4	2–5–0
November 18	Wesleyan*		Sports Center of Connecticut • Shelton, CT	Devan Kane	W 5–1	3–5–0
November 19	at Wesleyan*		Spurrier-Snyder Rink • Middletown, CT	Devan Kane	L 3–5	3–6–0
December 2	at Franklin Pierce*		Jason Ritchie Ice Arena • Winchendon, MA	Devan Kane	T 1–1 ^{OT}	3–6–1
December 3	Franklin Pierce*		Sports Center of Connecticut • Shelton, CT	Sarah Erban	W 4–3	4–6–1
December 9	Johnson & Wales*		Sports Center of Connecticut • Shelton, CT	Sarah Erban	W 6–4	5–6–1
December 10	Johnson & Wales*		Sports Center of Connecticut • Shelton, CT	Sarah Erban	W 2–0	6–6–1
January 3, 2017	at Southern Maine*		USM Ice Arena • Gorham, ME	Devan Kane	W 4–1	7–6–1
January 4	at Southern Maine*		USM Ice Arena • Gorham, ME	Sarah Erban	W 5–0	8–6–1
January 6	vs. Hamilton*		Cairns Arena • South Burlington, VT (Doubletree Hockey Classic)	Devan Kane	W 4–3 ^{OT}	9–6–1
January 7	at St. Michaels*		Cairns Arena • South Burlington, VT (Doubletree Hockey Classic)	Sarah Erban	W 3–1	10–6–1
January 10	Morrisville State*		Sports Center of Connecticut • Shelton, CT	Devan Kane	L 2–3 ^{OT}	10–7–1
January 11	Morrisville State*		Sports Center of Connecticut • Shelton, CT	Sarah Erban	L 1–2	10–8–1
January 13	St. Michaels*		Sports Center of Connecticut • Shelton, CT	Devan Kane	W 3–1	11–8–1
January 14	at Salem State*		O'Keefe Sports Complex • Salem, MA	Sarah Erban	W 4–1	12–8–1
January 20	at Stevenson*		Reistertown Sportsplex • Reistertown, MD	Devan Kane	W 3–0	13–8–1
January 21	at Stevenson*		Reistertown Sportsplex • Reistertown, MD	Sarah Erban	W 6–1	14–8–1
January 27	Lebanon Valley*		Sports Center of Connecticut • Shelton, CT	Devan Kane	W 4–1	15–8–1
January 28	Lebanon Valley*		Sports Center of Connecticut • Shelton, CT	Sarah Erban	W 4–2	16–8–1
February 17	at Post*		Sports Center of Connecticut • Shelton, CT	Devan Kane	W 9–0	17–8–1
February 18	Post*		Sports Center of Connecticut • Shelton, CT	Sarah Erban	W 12–1	18–8–1
NEHC Open
February 25	Saint Anselm*		Sports Center of Connecticut • Shelton, CT	Devan Kane	L 1–5	18–9–1
February 26	Franklin Pierce*		Sports Center of Connecticut • Shelton, CT	Sarah Erban	T 4–4 ^{OT}	18–9–2
*Non-conference game. ^{#}Rankings from USCHO.com Poll.
