= Acrobatics and tumbling =

American college women's sport

- Highest governing body: National Collegiate Acrobatics & Tumbling Association (NCATA)
- First played: 2007
- Registered players: 1,200
- Clubs: 50

Characteristics
- Team members: Between 24 and 45 athletes
- Mixed-sex: No
- Type: Indoor gymnastic sport

Presence
- Country or region: United States
- Olympic: No

Acrobatics and tumbling is a varsity women's sport played at American colleges and universities. The sport has been described as a combination of artistic gymnastics and competitive cheerleading. The sport is governed by the National Collegiate Acrobatics & Tumbling Association (NCATA).

== History ==
The University of Maryland announced in 2003 that it would add a competitive cheerleading team to its roster of available sports. The University of Oregon followed in 2007, renaming the sport to "team stunts and gymnastics". The current name of the sport was adopted in 2011. Acrobatics and tumbling was specifically designed to be played at the collegiate level, although youth level programs are emerging. The sport has been added by various colleges and universities as a way to increase the number of female athletes at their institutions.

In 2020, acrobatics and tumbling was designated as an emerging women's sport by the National Collegiate Athletic Association (NCAA). In 2026, the sport was given championship status by the NCAA.
