= List of Connecticut Whale (PHF) records =

This is a list of franchise records for the Connecticut Whale of the Premier Hockey Federation.

== Regular season ==
=== All players ===
==== Points ====
Player	Ctry	Pos	GP	Pts
Kelli Stack	(United States)	F	17	22
Kelly Babstock	(Canada)	F	18	22
Kaleigh Fratkin	(Canada)	D	18	17
Jordan Brickner	(United States)	D	18	13
Shiann Darkangelo	(United States)	F	13	13

==== Goals ====
Player	Ctry	Pos	GP	G
Shiann Darkangelo	(United States)	F	13	10
Kelly Babstock	(Canada)	F	18	9
Kelli Stack	(United States)	F	17	8
Danielle Ward	(United States)	F	18	5
Kaleigh Fratkin	(Canada)	D	18	5

==== Assists ====
Player	Ctry	Pos	GP	A
Kelli Stack	(United States)	F	17	14
Jordan Brickner	(United States)	D	18	13
Kelly Babstock	(Canada)	F	18	13
Kaleigh Fratkin	(Canada)	D	18	12
Micaela Long	(United States)	F	17	7

==== Games played ====
Player	Ctry	Pos	GP
Alyssa Wohlfeiler	(United States)	F	18
Danielle Ward	(United States)	F	18
Jordan Brickner	(United States)	D	18
Kaleigh Fratkin	(Canada)	D	18
Kelly Babstock	(Canada)	F	18

==== Penalty minutes ====
Player	Ctry	Pos	GP	PIM
Kaleigh Fratkin	(Canada)	D	18	40
Micaela Long	(United States)	F	17	27
Kelli Stack	(United States)	F	17	24
Kelly Babstock	(Canada)	F	18	24
Danielle Ward	(United States)	F	18	24

==== Game-winning goals ====
Player	Ctry	Pos	GWG
Kelli Stack	(United States)	F	3
Molly Engstrom	(United States)	D	2
Danielle Ward	(United States)	F	1
Kaleigh Fratkin	(Canada)	D	1
Kate Buesser	(United States)	F	1

==== Power-play goals ====
Player	Ctry	Pos	PP
Kelly Babstock	(United States)	F	4
Kaleigh Fratkin	(Canada)	D	3
Alyssa Wohlfeiler	(United States)	F	2
Sam Faber	(United States)	F	2
Jessica Koizumi	(United States)	F	1

==== Short-handed goals ====
Player	Ctry	Pos	SH
Kelly Babstock	(United States)	F	2
Kelli Stack	(United States)	F	1
Shiann Darkangelo	(United States)	F	1
Alyssa Wohlfeiler	(United States)	F	0
Anya Battaglino	(United States)	D	0

=== Defensemen ===
==== Points ====
Player	Ctry	GP	Pts
Kaleigh Fratkin	(Canada)	18	17
Jordan Brickner	(United States)	18	13
Shannon Doyle	(Canada)	18	5
Molly Engstrom	(United States)	15	5
Lindsay Berman	(United States)	4	1

=== Goaltenders ===
==== Games played ====
Player	Ctry	GP
Jaimie Leonoff	(Canada)	10
Nicole Stock	(United States)	6
Shenae Lundberg	(United States)	2
Chelsea Laden	(United States)	1

==== Wins ====
Player	Ctry	GP	W
Jaimie Leonoff	(Canada)	10	7
Nicole Stock	(United States)	6	4
Shenae Lundberg	(United States)	2	1
Chelsea Laden	(United States)	1	1

*Minimum of 60 minutes played for goaltenders

==== Shutouts ====
Player	Ctry	GP	SO
Jaimie Leonoff	(Canada)	10	0
Nicole Stock	(United States)	6	0
Shenae Lundberg	(United States)	2	0
Chelsea Laden	(United States)	1	0

*Minimum of 60 minutes played for goaltenders

==== Goals against average ====
Player	Ctry	GP	GAA
Shenae Lundberg	(United States)	2	1.97
Chelsea Laden	(United States)	1	2.00
Nicole Stock	(United States)	6	2.62
Jaimie Leonoff	(Canada)	10	2.96

*Minimum of 60 minutes played for goaltenders

==== Save percentage ====
Player	Ctry	GP	SV%
Chelsea Laden	(United States)	1	.938
Jaimie Leonoff	(Canada)	10	.936
Nicole Stock	(United States)	6	.929
Shenae Lundberg	(United States)	2	.920

*Minimum of 60 minutes played for goaltenders

== Playoffs ==
=== All players ===
==== Points ====
Player	Ctry	Pos	GP	Pts
Kelly Babstock	(Canada)	F	3	4
Kate Buesser	(United States)	F	3	2
Kelli Stack	(United States)	F	3	2
Micaela Long	(United States)	F	3	2
Sam Faber	(United States)	F	3	2

==== Goals ====
Player	Ctry	Pos	GP	G
Kelly Babstock	(Canada)	F	3	4
Kelli Stack	(United States)	F	3	2
Sam Faber	(United States)	F	3	1
Shiann Darkangelo	(United States)	F	3	0
Danielle Ward	(United States)	F	3	0

==== Assists ====
Player	Ctry	Pos	GP	A
Kate Buesser	(United States)	F	3	2
Micaela Long	(United States)	F	3	2
Shiann Darkangelo	(United States)	F	3	2
Sam Faber	(United States)	F	3	1
Danielle Ward	(United States)	F	3	1

==== Games played ====
Player	Ctry	Pos	GP
Kaleigh Fratkin	(Canada)	D	3
Kelli Stack	(United States)	F	3
Kelly Babstock	(Canada)	F	3
Shiann Darkangelo	(United States)	F	3
Danielle Ward	(United States)	F	3

==== Penalty minutes ====
Player	Ctry	Pos	GP	PIM
Kaleigh Fratkin	(Canada)	D	3	6
Danielle Ward	(United States)	F	3	4
Kelly Babstock	(Canada)	F	3	2
Kate Buesser	(United States)	F	3	2
Micaela Long	(United States)	F	3	2

==== Game-winning goals ====
Player	Ctry	Pos	GWG
Kelli Stack	(United States)	F	1
Kaleigh Fratkin	(Canada)	F	0
Kelly Babstock	(Canada)	F	0
Shiann Darkangelo	(United States)	F	0
Danielle Ward	(United States)	F	0

==== Power play goals ====
Player	Ctry	Pos	PP
Kelly Babstock	(Canada)	F	1
Sam Faber	(United States)	F	1
Kaleigh Fratkin	(Canada)	D	0
Shiann Darkangelo	(United States)	F	0
Danielle Ward	(United States)	F	0

==== Short-handed goals ====
Player	Ctry	Pos	SH
Kelly Babstock	(Canada)	F	1
Kelli Stack	(United States)	F	0
Kaleigh Fratkin	(Canada)	D	0
Shiann Darkangelo	(United States)	F	0
Danielle Ward	(United States)	F	0

=== Defensemen ===
==== Points ====
Player	Ctry	GP	Pts
Kaleigh Fratkin	(Canada)	3	1
Shannon Doyle	(Canada)	3	1
Jordan Brickner	(United States)	3	0
Molly Engstrom	(United States)	3	0
Anya Battaglino	(United States)	0	0

=== Goaltenders ===
==== Games played ====
Player	Ctry	GP
Jaimie Leonoff	(Canada)	2
Nicole Stock	(United States)	1
Shenae Lundberg	(United States)	0

==== Wins ====
Player	Ctry	GP	W
Jaimie Leonoff	(Canada)	2	1
Nicole Stock	(United States)	1	0
Shenae Lundberg	(United States)	0	0

*Minimum of 60 minutes played for goaltenders

==== Goals against average ====
Player	Ctry	GP	GAA
Jaimie Leonoff	(Canada)	2	1.51
Nicole Stock	(United States)	1	3.04
Shenae Lundberg	(United States)	0	0.00

*Minimum of 60 minutes played for goaltenders

==== Save percentage ====
Player	Ctry	GP	SV%
Jaimie Leonoff	(Canada)	2	.947
Nicole Stock	(United States)	1	.893
Shenae Lundberg	(United States)	0	1.000

*Minimum of 60 minutes played for goaltenders

==== Shutouts ====
Player	Ctry	GP	SO
Jaimie Leonoff	(Canada)	2	1
Nicole Stock	(United States)	1	0
Shenae Lundberg	(United States)	0	0

*Minimum of 60 minutes played for goaltenders

== Franchise records ==
=== Franchise single season ===
Most points	26	2015-16
Most wins	13	2015-16
Most losses	5	2015-16
Most overtime losses	0	2015-16
Most goals for	61	2015-16
Most goals against	51	2015-16
Fewest points	26	2015-16
Fewest wins	13	2015-16
Fewest losses	5	2015-16
Fewest overtime losses	0	2015-16
Fewest goals for	61	2015-16
Fewest goals against	51	2015-16
Most penalty minutes	248	2015-16
Fewest penalty minutes	248	2015-16
Most shutouts	0	2015-16

=== Franchise single game ===
Most goals for	7	November 22, 2015 (final 7-6 vs BUF)
Most goals against	6	December 5, 2015 (final 7-6 vs BUF)
Biggest goal differential (win)	+5	January 3, 2016 (final 6-1 vs NYR)
Biggest goal differential (loss)	-3	3 times
Most shots for	48	October 18, 2015 (vs BUF)
Least shots for	17	February 14, 2016 (vs BOS)
Most shots against	66	February 21, 2016 (vs BOS)
Least shots against	24	March 5, 2016 (vs BUF)
Most penalty minutes	25	December 6, 2015 (vs BUF)
Longest game	65:00 + 3 round of shootout	3 times

=== Streaks ===
Winning streaks
Overall	8	October 11, 2015 – December 13, 2015
Home	2	3 times
Away	7	October 18, 2015 – Jan 3, 2016
Losing streaks
Overall	2	January 17, 2016 – January 31, 2016, and February 14, 2016 – February 21, 2016
Home	2	March 5, 2016 - Pres
Away	2	January 17, 2016 - Pres
Winless streaks
Overall	2	January 17, 2016 – January 31, 2016, and February 14, 2016 – February 21, 2016
Home	2	March 5, 2016 - Pres
Away	2	January 17, 2016 – Present (2L)

== Individual records ==
=== Career leaders ===
	All-time leader	
Games	18	Multi-Players
Games (defenseman)	18	Multi-Players
Consecutive games	18	Multi-Players
Points	22	Kelli Stack and Kelly Babstock
Points (defenseman)	17	Kaleigh Fratkin
Goals	10	Shiann Darkangelo
Goals (defenseman)	5	Kaleigh Fratkin
Power play goals	4	Kelly Babstock
Power play goals (defenseman)	3	Kaleigh Fratkin
Shorthanded goals	2	Kelly Babstock
Game winning goals	3	Kelli Stack
Overtime goals	1	Molly Enstrom
Hat tricks	0	
Assists	14	Kelli Stack
Assists (defenseman)	13	Jordan Brickner
Shots	86	Kelli Stack
Penalty minutes	40	Kaleigh Fratkin
Goaltender games	10	Jaimie Leonoff
Goaltender minutes	567	Jaimie Leonoff
Goaltender wins	7	Jaimie Leonoff
Shutouts	0	
Goals against average	1.97	Shenae Lindberg
Save percentage	.938	Chelsea Laden
Coaching wins	11	Jake Mastel

*Minimum of 60 minutes played for goaltenders

=== Single season leaders ===
	All-time leader	
Points	22	2 players (2015-16)
Points (defenseman)	15	Kaleigh Fratkin (2015-16)
Points (rookie)	0	
Goals	10	Shiann Darkangelo (2015-16)
Goals (defenseman)	5	Kaleigh Fratkin (2015-16)
Goals (rookie)	0	
Power play goals	4	Kelly Babstock (2015-16)
Power play goals (defenseman)	3	Kaleigh Fratkin (2015-16)
Shorthanded goals	2	Kelly Babstock (2015-16)
Game winning goals	3	Kelli Stack (2015-16)
Overtime goals	1	Molly Engstrom (2015-16)
Hat tricks	0	
Assists	14	Kelli Stack (2015-16)
Assists (defenseman)	13	Jordan Brickner (2015-16)
Assists (rookie)	0	
Shots	86	Kelli Stack (2015-16)
Penalty minutes	40	Kaleigh Fratkin (2015-16)
Goaltender games	10	Jaimie Leonoff (2015-16)
Goaltender minutes	567	Jaimie Leonoff (2015-16)
Goaltender wins	7	Jaimie Leonoff (2015-16)
Shutouts	0	
Goals against average	1.97	Shenae Lundberg (2015-16)
Save percentage	.938	Chelsea Laden (2015-16)

*Minimum of 60 minutes played for goaltenders

=== Individual single game leaders ===
	Player(s)	
Points (single player)	4	Kaleigh Fratkin
Points (defenseman)	4	Kaleigh Fratkin
Points (rookie)	0	
Goals	2	4 times
Goals (defenseman)	2	Kaleigh Fratkin
Goals (rookie)	0	
Power play goals	2	Kaleigh Fratkin
Shorthanded goals	1	3 times
Assists	3	Brittany Dougherty and Jordan Brickner
Assists (defenseman)	3	Jordan Brickner
Assists (rookie)	0	
Shots (Game)	12	Kelly Babstock
Penalty minutes	15	Molly Engstrom
Goaltender shots faced (game)	65	Jaimie Leonoff
Goaltender saves	61	Jaimie Leonoff

¹ NWHL record

== See also ==
- PHF awards
- List of Boston Pride records
- List of Buffalo Beauts records
- List of Minnesota Whitecaps records
- List of PHF records (individual)
