= List of PHF records (individual) =

This is a list of all-time individual records recognized by the Premier Hockey Federation, ending with the 2022–23 PHF season.

== Regular season ==
=== Most goals ===
Source.

Player	Goals	Team(s)	Seasons played
Jillian Dempsey	70	Boston Pride	2015–23
Madison Packer	65	Metropolitan Riveters	2015–23
Allie Thunstrom	58	Minnesota Whitecaps; Boston Pride	2018–23
Jonna Albers	42	Minnesota Whitecaps	2018–23
Kelly Babstock	42	Connecticut Whale; Buffalo Beauts; Metropolitan Riveters	2015–23
McKenna Brand	37	Boston Pride	2018–23
Shiann Darkangelo	37	Buffalo Beauts; Toronto Six	2015–23
Kennedy Marchment	30	Connecticut Whale	2021–23
Mikyla Grant-Mentis	29	Buffalo Beauts; Toronto Six	2019–23
Taylor Accursi	29	Buffalo Beauts; Boston Pride	2017–23

=== Most assists ===
Source.

Player	Assists	Team(s)	Seasons played
Jillian Dempsey	76	Boston Pride	2015–23
Kaleigh Fratkin	71	Connecticut Whale; New York Riveters; Boston Pride	2015–23
Madison Packer	64	Metropolitan Riveters	2015–23
Jonna Albers	58	Minnesota Whitecaps	2018–23
Kelly Babstock	54	Connecticut Whale; Buffalo Beauts; Metropolitan Riveters	2015–23
Amanda Boulier	51	Connecticut Whale; Minnesota Whitecaps; Boston Pride	2017–23
McKenna Brand	50	Boston Pride	2018–23
Shannon Turner	43	Connecticut Whale	2015–23
Emily Fluke	42	Connecticut Whale; Boston Pride; Toronto Six	2017–22
Christina Putigna	40	Boston Pride	2019–23

=== Most points ===
Source.

Player	Points	Team(s)	Seasons played
Jillian Dempsey	146	Boston Pride	2015–23
Madison Packer	129	Metropolitan Riveters	2015–23
Jonna Albers	100	Minnesota Whitecaps	2018–23
Kelly Babstock	96	Connecticut Whale; Buffalo Beauts	2015–23
McKenna Brand	87	Boston Pride	2018–23
Kaleigh Fratkin	86	Connecticut Whale; New York Riveters; Buffalo Beauts	2015–23
Allie Thunstrom	84	Minnesota Whitecaps	2018–23
Shiann Darkangelo	73	Buffalo Beauts; Toronto Six	2015–23
Kennedy Marchment	68	Connecticut Whale	2021–23
Amanda Boulier	67	Connecticut Whale; Minnesota Whitecaps; Boston Pride	2017–23

=== Most games ===
Source.

Player	Games	Team(s)	Seasons played
Jillian Dempsey	142	Boston Pride	2015–23
Kaleigh Fratkin	138	Connecticut Whale; New York Riveters; Boston Pride	2015–23
Shannon Turner	132	Connecticut Whale	2015–23
Madison Packer	131	Metropolitan Riveters	2015–23
Kelly Babstock	112	Connecticut Whale; Buffalo Beauts; Metropolitan Riveters	2015–23
Elena Orlando	109	New York Riveters; Connecticut Whale; Buffalo Beauts	2015–22
Janine Weber	98	New York Riveters; Boston Pride; Connecticut Whale	2015–23
Amanda Boulier	94	Connecticut Whale; Minnesota Whitecaps; Boston Pride	2017–23
McKenna Brand	91	Boston Pride	2018–23
Kiira Dosdall-Arena	91	Metropolitan Riveters; Connecticut Whale	2015–23

=== Most penalty minutes ===
Source.

Player	Penalty minutes	Team(s)	Seasons played
Kaleigh Fratkin	202	Connecticut Whale; New York Riveters; Boston Pride	2015–23
Madison Packer	177	Metropolitan Riveters	2015–23
Kelly Babstock	160	Connecticut Whale; Buffalo Beauts; Metropolitan Riveters	2015–23
Shannon Turner	122	Connecticut Whale	2015–23
Rebecca Morse	74	Metropolitan Riveters; Connecticut Whale	2016–22
Alyssa Wohlfeiler	70	Connecticut Whale; Boston Pride	2015–23
Kendall Cornine	60	Metropolitan Riveters	2019–23
Kiira Dosdall-Arena	60	Metropolitan Riveters; Connecticut Whale	2015–23
Colleen Murphy	60	Buffalo Beauts; Connecticut Whale; Metropolitan Riveters	2017–22
Harrison Browne	56	Buffalo Beauts; Metropolitan Riveters	2015–18
Chelsey Brodt-Rosenthal	56	Minnesota Whitecaps	2018–22

=== Most goaltending wins ===
Source.

Player	Wins	Team(s)	Seasons played
Amanda Leveille	59	Buffalo Beauts; Minnesota Whitecaps	2016–23
Elaine Chuli	32	Toronto Six	2020–23
Brittany Ott	26	Boston Pride	2015–19
Kaitlin Burt	23	Boston Pride; Metropolitan Riveters	2018–23
Abbie Ives	22	Connecticut Whale	2020–23
Katie Fitzgerald	21	Metropolitan Riveters	2016–19
Lovisa Selander	21	Boston Pride	2019–23
Corinne Schroeder	19	Boston Pride	2022–23
Carly Jackson	12	Buffalo Beauts; Toronto Six	2020–23
Sam Walther	8	Connecticut Whale; Metropolitan Riveters	2018–20
Mariah Fujimagari	8	Buffalo Beauts; Connecticut Whale	2019–22
Victoria Hanson	8	Boston Pride	2019–22

== Playoffs ==
=== Most goals ===
Source.

Player	Goals	Team(s)	Seasons played
Hilary Knight	10	Boston Pride	2015–17
Jillian Dempsey	9	Boston Pride	2015–23
Allie Thunstrom	7	Minnesota Whitecaps; Boston Pride	2018–23
Brianna Decker	6	Boston Pride	2015–17
Audra Morrison	6	Metropolitan Riveters; Minnesota Whitecaps	2018–22
Jonna Albers	5	Minnesota Whitecaps	2018–23
Megan Bozek	5	Buffalo Beauts	2015–17
Taylor Wenczkowski	5	Boston Pride	2020–23
Kelly Babstock	5	Connecticut Whale; Buffalo Beauts; Metropolitan Riveters	2015–22
Taylor Girard	4	Connecticut Whale	2021–23
Emily Janiga	4	Buffalo Beauts; Metropolitan Riveters	2016–22

=== Most assists ===
Source.

Player	Assists	Team(s)	Seasons played
Jonna Albers	10	Minnesota Whitecaps	2018–23
Kaleigh Fratkin	10	Connecticut Whale; New York Riveters; Boston Pride	2015–23
Brianna Decker	8	Boston Pride	2015–17
Mary Parker	8	Boston Pride	2016–22
Kacey Bellamy	8	Boston Pride	2015–17
Jillian Dempsey	6	Boston Pride	2015–23
Gigi Marvin	6	Boston Pride	2015–19
Christina Putigna	6	Boston Pride	2019–23
Hayley Scamurra	6	Buffalo Beauts	2016–19
Shiann Darkangelo	6	Connecticut Whale; Buffalo Beauts; Toronto Six	2015–23
Shannon Turner	6	Connecticut Whale	2015–23

=== Most points ===
Source.

Player	Points	Team(s)	Seasons played
Jillian Dempsey	15	Boston Pride	2015–23
Jonna Albers	15	Minnesota Whitecaps	2018–23
Hilary Knight	14	Boston Pride	2015–17
Brianna Decker	14	Boston Pride	2015–17
Mary Parker	11	Boston Pride	2016–22
Kaleigh Fratkin	11	Connecticut Whale; New York Riveters; Boston Pride	2015–23
Audra Morrison	10	Metropolitan Riveters; Minnesota Whitecaps	2018–22
Megan Bozek	10	Buffalo Beauts	2015–17
Allie Thunstrom	9	Minnesota Whitecaps; Boston Pride	2018–23
Gigi Marvin	9	Boston Pride	2015–19
Christina Putigna	9	Boston Pride	2019–23

=== Most games ===
Source.

Player	Games	Team(s)	Seasons played
Jillian Dempsey	16	Boston Pride	2015–23
Kaleigh Fratkin	14	Connecticut Whale; New York Riveters; Boston Pride	2015–23
Shannon Turner	13	Connecticut Whale	2015–23
Amanda Boulier	12	Connecticut Whale; Minnesota Whitecaps; Boston Pride	2017–23
Shiann Darkangelo	11	Buffalo Beauts; Toronto Six	2015–23
Janine Weber	11	New York Riveters; Boston Pride; Connecticut Whale	2015–23
Corinne Buie	11	Boston Pride; Buffalo Beauts; Minnesota Whitecaps	2015–20
Jonna Albers	10	Minnesota Whitecaps	2018–23
Mary Parker	10	Boston Pride	2016–22
9 players tied at 9 games

=== Most penalty minutes ===
Source.

Player	Penalty minutes	Team(s)	Seasons played
Shannon Turner	21	Connecticut Whale	2015–23
Tereza Vanisova	19	Boston Pride; Toronto Six	2020–23
Madison Packer	16	Metropolitan Riveters	2015–22
Sarah Casorso	16	Buffalo Beauts	2016–18
Kaleigh Fratkin	14	Connecticut Whale; New York Riveters; Boston Pride	2015–23
Kelly Babstock	14	Connecticut Whale; Buffalo Beauts; Metropolitan Riveters	2015–22
Jillian Dempsey	13	Boston Pride	2015–23
Harrison Browne	12	Buffalo Beauts; Metropolitan Riveters	2015–18
Marissa Gedman	12	Boston Pride	2015–16
5 players tied at 8 PIM

=== Most goaltending wins ===
Source.

Player	Wins	Team(s)	Seasons played
Amanda Leveille	9	Buffalo Beauts; Minnesota Whitecaps	2016–23
Brittany Ott	5	Boston Pride	2015–19
Brianne McLaughlin	3	Buffalo Beauts	2015–17
Elaine Chuli	3	Toronto Six	2020–23
Katie Fitzgerald	3	Metropolitan Riveters	2016–19
Kaitlin Burt	3	Boston Pride; Metropolitan Riveters	2018–22
Lovisa Selander	3	Boston Pride	2019–23
Abbie Ives	2	Connecticut Whale	2020–23
Brooke Wolejko	1	Connecticut Whale; Metropolitan Riveters	2019–22
Jaimie Leonoff	1	Connecticut Whale	2015–16
Shannon Szabados	1	Buffalo Beauts	2018–19

== See also ==
- PHF awards
- List of Boston Pride records
- List of Buffalo Beauts records
- List of Connecticut Whale (PHF) records
- List of Minnesota Whitecaps records
