= 2015–16 Connecticut Whale (NWHL) season =

2015–16 Connecticut Whale (PHF)
- League: 2nd NWHL
- 2015–16 record: 13–5–0
- Home record: 6–3–0
- Road record: 7–2–0
- Goals for: 61
- Goals against: 51

Team information
- General manager: George Speirs (Interim)
- Coach: Jake Mastel (Until January 29, 2016); Heather Linstad (from January 29, 2016)
- Assistant coach: Lisa Giovanelli (January 29, 2016–Current)
- Captain: Jessica Koizumi
- Alternate captains: Kaleigh Fratkin
- Arena: Chelsea Piers CT

Team leaders
- Goals: Shiann Darkangelo (10)
- Assists: Kelli Stack (14)
- Points: Kelli Stack (22); Kelly Babstock
- Penalty minutes: Kaleigh Fratkin (40)
- Wins: Jaimie Leonoff (7)
- Goals against average: Shenae Lundberg (1.97)

The 2015–16 Connecticut Whale season was the first in franchise history and the Premier Hockey Federation's inaugural season.

== Offseason ==
- On July 1, the Whale signed former BU Terriers blueliner and 2015 Clarkson Cup champion Kaleigh Fratkin to a contract, making her the first Canadian to sign an NWHL contract.

== Regular season ==
=== Standings ===
Pos	Team	GP	W	L	OTL	W%	GF	GA	GD	Pts
1	y – Boston Pride	18	14	3	1	0.806	75	39	+36	29
2	Connecticut Whale	18	13	5	0	0.722	61	51	+10	26
3	Buffalo Beauts	18	5	9	4	0.389	56	66	−10	14
4	New York Riveters	18	4	12	2	0.278	40	76	−36	10

Source: PHF
y – Clinched division

=== Game log ===
2015–16 Schedule

Game	Date	Opponent	Score	OT	Decision	Location	Record	Points	Gamesheet
1	October 11	New York Riveters	4–1		Leonoff	Chelsea Piers CT	1–0–0	2	
2	October 18	@ Buffalo Beauts	5–2		Laden	HarborCenter	2–0–0	4	
3	October 25	@ New York Riveters	3–1		Stock	Aviator Sports and Events Center	3–0–0	6	
4	November 15	@ Buffalo Beauts	3–2		Leonoff	HarborCenter	4–0–0	8	
5	November 22	@ Buffalo Beauts	7–6	SO	Stock	HarborCenter	5–0–0	10	
6	November 29	@ Boston Pride	4–3		Leonoff	Bright Hockey Center	6–0–0	12	
7	December 6	Buffalo Beauts	3–2	SO	Leonoff	Chelsea Piers CT	7–0–0	14	
8	December 13	@ New York Riveters	4–3	SO	Leonoff	Aviator Sports and Events Center	8–0–0	16	
9	December 27	Boston Pride	1–2		Stock	Chelsea Piers CT	8–1–0	16	
10	January 3	@ New York Riveters	6–1		Stock	Aviator Sports and Events Center	9–1–0	18	
11	January 9	New York Riveters	4–3		Leonoff	Ingalls Rink	10–1–0	20	
12	January 10	Buffalo Beauts	5–3		Stock	Chelsea Piers CT	11–1–0	22	
13	January 17	@ Boston Pride	1–4		Leonoff	Bright Hockey Center	11–2–0	22	
14	January 31	Boston Pride	2–5		Leonoff	Chelsea Piers CT	11–3–0	22	
15	February 7	Buffalo Beauts	3–2	OT	Lundberg	Chelsea Piers CT	12–3–0	24	
16	February 14	@ Boston Pride	2–4		Stock	Bright Hockey Center	12–4–0	24	
17	February 21	Boston Pride	3–5		Leonoff	Chelsea Piers CT	12–5–0	24	
18	February 28	New York Riveters	4–2		Lundberg	Chelsea Piers CT	13–5–0	26	

Win (2 points) Overtime/Shootout loss (1 point) Loss (0 points)

== Playoffs ==
=== Game log ===
2016 Isobel Cup Playoffs
Semifinals vs. Buffalo Beauts; Buffalo Beauts won series 2–1

Game	Date	Opponent	Score	OT	Decision	Location	Record	Gamesheet
1	March 4	Buffalo Beauts	3–0			Chelsea Piers CT	1–0	(No gamesheet available)
2	March 5	Buffalo Beauts	1–4			Chelsea Piers CT	1–1	(No gamesheet available)
3	March 6	Buffalo Beauts	3–4		Stock	Chelsea Piers CT	1–2	

Win Loss

== Statistics ==
Final

=== Skaters ===
Regular season
Player	GP	G	A	Pts	PIM
Kelli Stack	17	8	14	22	24
Kelly Babstock	18	9	13	22	24
Kaleigh Fratkin	18	5	12	17	40
Shiann Darkangelo	13	10	3	13	0
Jordan Brickner	18	0	12	12	2
Danielle Ward	18	5	5	10	24
Micaela Long	17	3	7	10	27
Yekaterina Smolentseva	14	3	5	8	2
Alyssa Wohlfeiler	18	3	4	7	20
Jessica Koizumi	15	2	5	7	8
Sam Faber	13	3	3	6	14
Brittany Dougherty	17	1	4	5	14
Kate Buesser	12	3	2	5	2
Molly Engstrom	15	3	2	5	21
Shannon Doyle	18	2	3	5	12
Lindsay Berman	4	0	1	1	0
Tara Tomimoto	13	1	0	1	6
Anya Battaglino	8	0	0	0	6
Katia Pashkevitch	1	0	0	0	0

Playoffs
Player	GP	G	A	Pts	PIM
Kelly Babstock	3	4	0	4	2
Kate Buesser	3	0	2	2	2
Kelli Stack	3	2	0	2	2
Micaela Long	3	0	2	2	2
Sam Faber	3	1	1	2	2
Shiann Darkangelo	3	0	2	2	0
Danielle Ward	3	0	1	1	4
Jessica Koizumi	3	0	1	1	0
Molly Engstrom	3	0	1	1	2
Shannon Doyle	3	0	1	1	2
Alyssa Wohlfeiler	1	0	0	0	2
Anya Battaglino	1	0	0	0	2
Brittany Dougherty	3	0	0	0	0
Jordan Brickner	3	0	0	0	0
Kaleigh Fratkin	3	0	0	0	6
Tara Tomimoto	1	0	0	0	0
Yekaterina Smolentseva	3	0	0	0	0

=== Goaltenders ===
Regular season
Player	GP	TOI	W	L	OT	GA	GAA	SA	SV%	SO	PIM
Jaimie Leonoff	10	567:15	7	3	0	28	2.96	438	0.936	0	0
Nicole Stock	6	343:07	4	2	0	15	2.62	211	0.923	0	0
Chelsea Laden^{‡}	1	60:00	1	0	0	2	2.00	32	0.938	0	0
Shenae Lundberg^{†}	2	122:08	1	0	0	0	1.97	50	0.920	0	0

Playoffs
Player	GP	TOI	W	L	OT	GA	GAA	SA	SV%	SO	PIM
Jaimie Leonoff	2	118:56	1	1	0	3	1.51	57	0.947	1	0
Nicole Stock	1	60:00	0	1	0	4	4.00	28	0.846	0	0

^{†}Denotes player spent time with another team before joining the Whale. Stats reflect time with the Whale only.
^{‡}Denotes player was traded mid-season. Stats reflect time with the Whale only.

== Roster ==
Updated February 20, 2016

No.	Nat	Player	Pos	S/G	Age	Acquired	Birthplace
8	(Canada)	Kelly Babstock	F	L	23	2015	Mississauga, Ontario
10	(United States)	Lindsay Berman	D	L	27	2015	Odenton, Maryland
26	(United States)	Jordan Brickner	D	L	25	2015	Lake Forest, Illinois
27	(United States)	Shiann Darkangelo	F	L	22	2015	Brighton, Michigan
19	(United States)	Brittany Dougherty	F	L	25	2015	Chesterfield, Michigan
6	(Canada)	Shannon Doyle	D	R	24	2015	Baldwin, Ontario
9	(United States)	Molly Engstrom	D	R	33	2015	Siren, Wisconsin
28	(United States)	Sam Faber	F	R	28	2015	Mount Sinai, New York
13	(Canada)	Kaleigh Fratkin (A)	D	R	23	2015	Burnaby, British Columbia
56	(United States)	Jessica Koizumi (C)	F	L	30	2015	Honolulu, Hawaii
32	(Canada)	Jaimie Leonoff	G	L	23	2015	Montreal, Quebec
16	(United States)	Micaela Long	F	L		2015	South Boston, Massachusetts
1	(United States)	Shanae Lundberg	G	L	23	2016	Peterborough, New Hampshire
17	(Russia)	Yekaterina Smolentseva	F	L	34	2015	Yekaterinburg, Russia
61	(United States)	Kelli Stack	F	R	28	2015	Brooklyn Heights, Ohio
24	(United States)	Nicole Stock	G	R		2015	Buffalo Grove, Illinois
22	(United States)	Danielle Ward	F	R	26	2015	Lansing, Michigan
88	(United States)	Alyssa Wohlfeiler	F	R	26	2015	Saugus, California

== Awards and honors ==
NWHL Player of the Week

- Kelli Stack – October 11, 2015
- Shiann Darkangelo – December 15, 2015
- Danielle Ward - January 10, 2016
- Molly Engstrom - February 7, 2016
- Shenae Lundberg - February 28, 2016

NWHL 1st All-Star Game selection

- Jordan Brickner (Team Knight)
- Shiann Darkangelo (Team Pfalzer)
- Kaleigh Fratkin (Team Knight)
- Jaimie Leonoff (Team Knight)
- Kelli Stack (Team Knight)

== Transactions ==
=== Trades ===
January 27, 2016	To New York Riveters Chelsea Laden	To Connecticut Whale Shenae Lundberg

=== Signings ===
Player	Date	Contract terms
Shiann Darkangelo	June 25, 2015	$17,000
Sam Faber	June 25, 2015	$13,500
Chelsea Laden	June 25, 2015	$14,000
Kaleigh Fratkin	July 1, 2015	$20,000
Jessica Koizumi	July 9, 2015	$20,500
Danielle Ward	July 9, 2015	$10,000
Micaela Long	July 17, 2015	$10,000
Nicole Stock	July 17, 2015	$10,000
Jaimie Leonoff	July 26, 2015	$10,000
Kelly Babstock	August 4, 2015	$18,000
Brittney Dougherty	August 13, 2015	$10,000
Shannon Doyle	August 13, 2015	$15,000
Yekaterina Smolentseva	August 15, 2015	$22,000
Molly Engstrom	August 18, 2015	$12,000
Lindsay Berman	September 24, 2015	$15,000
Jordan Brickner	September 24, 2015	$10,000
Alyssa Wohlfeiler	September 24, 2015	$10,000
Kelli Stack	September 24, 2015	$25,000

=== Other ===
Name	Date	Details
Harry Rosenholtz	December 24, 2015	Resigned as General Manager
George Speirs	December 24, 2015	Named as interim General Manager
Jake Mastel	January 29, 2016	Resigned as Head Coach
Heather Linstad	January 29, 2016	Named as Head Coach
Lisa Giovanelli	January 29, 2016	Named as Assistant Coach

== Draft ==
The following were the Whale's selections in the 2015 NWHL Draft on June 20, 2015.

Round	#	Player	Pos	Nationality	College/Junior/Club team (League)
1	2	Hannah Brandt	F	United States	University of Minnesota (WCHA)
2	6	Michelle Picard	D	United States	Harvard University (ECAC)
3	10	Milica McMillen	D	United States	University of Minnesota (WCHA)
4	14	Maryanne Menefee	F	United States	University of Minnesota (WCHA)
5	18	Cassandra Poudrier	D	Canada	Cornell University (ECAC)
