= 2015–16 NWHL season =

- League: National Women's Hockey League
- Sport: Ice hockey
- Duration: October 11, 2015 – February 28, 2016

Inaugural draft
- Top draft pick: Alex Carpenter
- Picked by: New York Riveters

Regular season
- Season champions: Boston Pride
- Season MVP: Brianna Decker
- Top scorer: Hilary Knight

Isobel Cup
- Champions: Boston Pride
- Runners-up: Buffalo Beauts

NWHL seasons
- 2016–17

The 2015–16 NWHL season was the first season of operation of the National Women's Hockey League. Four teams competed for the inaugural Isobel Cup: the Boston Pride, Buffalo Beauts, New York Riveters, and Connecticut Whale.

== League business ==
- July 2015: The NWHL Foundation hosted a Canadian Training Camp Series in four different Canadian cities (Montreal, Ottawa, Toronto, Windsor).
- Late July 2015: A training camp for European players took place at Ristuccia Memorial Arena outside Boston on July 23, hosted by Boston Pride head coach Bobby Jay. Players from Switzerland, Sweden, Finland, Germany and Japan attended.

== All-star game ==
The 1st NWHL All-Star Game was held January 24, 2016, at HarborCenter in Buffalo, the home of the Beauts.

== Regular season ==
=== Standings ===
Pos	Team	GP	W	L	OTL	W%	GF	GA	GD	Pts
1	y – Boston Pride	18	14	3	1	0.806	75	39	+36	29
2	Connecticut Whale	18	13	5	0	0.722	61	51	+10	26
3	Buffalo Beauts	18	5	9	4	0.389	56	66	−10	14
4	New York Riveters	18	4	12	2	0.278	40	76	−36	10

Source: PHF
y – Clinched division

=== Schedule ===
All times in Eastern Standard Time (UTC−05:00).

Regular season
Date	Time	Visitor	Score	Home	OT	Notes	Gamesheet
October 11	1:30	New York	1–4	Connecticut			
October 11	3:30	Boston	4–1	Buffalo			
October 18	3:30	Connecticut	5–2	Buffalo			
October 18	8:00	Boston	7–1	New York			
October 25	3:30	Boston	5–3	Buffalo			
October 25	7:00	Connecticut	3–1	New York			
November 15	3:30	Connecticut	3–2	Buffalo			
November 15	7:00	Boston	2–3	New York			
November 22	3:00	New York	3–2	Boston			
November 22	3:30	Connecticut	7–6	Buffalo	SO		
November 29	3:00	Connecticut	4–3	Boston			
November 29	7:00	Buffalo	3–1	New York			
December 5	7:00	Buffalo	6–7	Boston			
December 6	3:30	New York	1–4	Boston			
December 6	4:30	Buffalo	2–3	Connecticut	SO		
December 13	6:30	Connecticut	4–3	New York	SO		
December 20	3:00	Buffalo	0–1	Boston			
December 27	3:30	New York	7–3	Buffalo			
December 27	4:30	Boston	2–1	Connecticut			
January 3	3:00	Buffalo	4–3	Boston	OT		
January 3	7:00	Connecticut	6–1	New York			
January 9	7:30	New York	3–4	Connecticut			
January 10	3:00	New York	1–8	Boston			
January 10	6:00	Buffalo	3–5	Connecticut			
January 17	3:00	Connecticut	1–4	Boston			
January 17	7:00	Buffalo	6–5	New York	SO		
January 31	3:30	New York	2–4	Buffalo			
January 31	6:00	Boston	5–2	Connecticut			
February 6	6:00	Boston	6–1	New York			
February 7	12:00	Buffalo	2–3	Connecticut	OT		
February 14	2:00	Buffalo	3–4	New York	SO		
February 14	3:00	Connecticut	2–4	Boston			
February 21	1:30	Boston	5–3	Connecticut			
February 21	3:30	New York	1–5	Buffalo			
February 28	3:30	Boston	3–2	Buffalo			
February 28	6:00	New York	2–4	Connecticut			
March 4	7:00	New York	0–6	Boston			
March 4	7:10	Buffalo	0–3	Connecticut			
March 5	7:30	Buffalo	4–1	Connecticut			
March 5	8:00	New York	4–7	Boston			
March 6	6:00	Buffalo	4–3	Connecticut			
March 11	7:30	Buffalo	3–4	Boston	OT		
March 12	7:30	Boston	3–1	Buffalo			

== Playoffs ==
Semifinals
1	Boston Pride	2
4	New York Riveters	0
2	Connecticut Whale	1
3	Buffalo Beauts	2

Finals
1	Boston Pride	2
3	Buffalo Beauts	0

== Statistics ==
=== Scoring leaders ===
- The following players led the league in regular season points at the conclusion of season.

Player	Team	GP	G	A	Pts	PIM
Hilary Knight	Boston Pride	17	15	18	33	8
Brianna Decker	Boston Pride	17	14	15	29	20
Kelli Stack	Connecticut Whale	17	8	14	22	24
Kelly Babstock	Connecticut Whale	18	9	13	22	24
Kelley Steadman	Buffalo Beauts	13	13	7	20	16

=== Milestones ===
Milestone	Player	Team	Date
First goal	Jessica Koizumi	Connecticut Whale	October 11, 2015
First Canadian to score a goal	Kelly Babstock	Connecticut Whale	October 11, 2015
First European to log an assist	Lyudmila Belyakova	New York Riveters	October 11, 2015
First multi-goal game	Hilary Knight (2 goals)	Boston Pride	October 11, 2015
First multi-point game	Kelli Stack (3 points)	Connecticut Whale	October 11, 2015
First multi-point game by a defenseman	Kacey Bellamy (2 points)	Boston Pride	October 11, 2015
First goaltending win	Jaimie Leonoff	Connecticut Whale	October 11, 2015
First American-born goaltender to win a regular season game	Brittany Ott	Boston Pride	October 11, 2015
First African-American player to compete in the NWHL	Blake Bolden	Boston Pride	October 11, 2015
First hat trick	Brianna Decker	Boston Pride	October 25, 2015
First international goaltender to win a regular season game	Nana Fujimoto	New York Riveters	November 15, 2015
First shootout goal	Kelly Babstock	Connecticut Whale	November 22, 2015
First European to score a goal	Yekaterina Smolentseva	Connecticut Whale	December 13, 2015
First shutout game	Brittany Ott	Boston Pride	December 20, 2015

== Awards and honors ==
- Brianna Decker, Boston Pride, 2016 NWHL Most Valuable Player
- Hilary Knight, Boston Pride, 2016 NWHL Scoring Champion
- Denna Laing, Boston Pride, 2016 NWHL Perseverance Award
- Denna Laing, Boston Pride, 2016 NWHL Foundation Award
- Gigi Marvin, Boston Pride, 2016 NWHL Defensive Player of the Year Award
- Brittany Ott, Boston Pride, 2016 NWHL Goaltender of the Year

== Transactions ==
=== NWHL draft ===
The 2015 NWHL draft took place in Boston on June 22, 2015. The draft was not binding on the players, who did not enter their names and did not have to give their consent. It was not clear that the players felt themselves bound by the decisions made in the draft. However, during the season the NWHL was frequently active on social media about draft picks' success in the NCAA, and on April 1, 2016, the NWHL announced that the draft would be enforced insofar as there would be salary cap penalties for teams that signed other teams' draftees.

A draft lottery was held by NWHL commissioner Dani Rylan, with the New York Riveters earning the first pick overall.

Notable first round picks included University of Minnesota forward Hannah Brandt by Connecticut, Northeastern University forward Kendall Coyne by Boston, and University of Wisconsin defenseman Courtney Burke by Buffalo.

= Indicates player with a prior Olympic appearance

= Indicates player with prior IIHF experience without appearing in the Olympics

#	Player	Pos	Nationality	Team	College/Junior/Club team (League)
1	Alex Carpenter	F	(United States)	New York Riveters	Boston College (HEA)
2	Hannah Brandt	F	(United States)	Connecticut Whale	University of Minnesota (WCHA)
3	Kendall Coyne	F	(United States)	Boston Pride	Northeastern (HEA)
4	Courtney Burke	D	(United States)	Buffalo Beauts	University of Wisconsin (WCHA)
5	Haley Skarupa	F	(United States)	New York Riveters	Boston College (HEA)
6	Michelle Picard	D	(United States)	Connecticut Whale	Harvard University (ECAC)
7	Emerance Maschmeyer	G	(Canada)	Boston Pride	Harvard University (ECAC)
8	Sarah Lefort	F	(Canada)	Buffalo Beauts	Boston University (HEA)
9	Erin Ambrose	D	(Canada)	New York Riveters	Clarkson University (ECAC)
10	Milica McMillen	D	(United States)	Connecticut Whale	University of Minnesota (WCHA)
11	Lexi Bender	D	(United States)	Boston Pride	Boston College (HEA)
12	Amanda Leveille	G	(Canada)	Buffalo Beauts	University of Minnesota (WCHA)
13	Dana Trivigno	F	(United States)	New York Riveters	Boston College (HEA)
14	Maryanne Menefee	F	(United States)	Connecticut Whale	University of Minnesota (WCHA)
15	Miye D'Oench	F	(United States)	Boston Pride	Harvard University (ECAC)
16	Emily Janiga	F	(United States)	Buffalo Beauts	Mercyhurst College (CHA)
17	Kimberly Newell	G	(Canada)	New York Riveters	Princeton University (ECAC)
18	Cassandra Poudrier	D	(Canada)	Connecticut Whale	Cornell University (ECAC)
19	Shannon MacAulay	F	(Canada)	Boston Pride	Clarkson University (ECAC)
20	Jenna Dingeldein	F	(Canada)	Buffalo Beauts	Mercyhurst College (CHA)

=== Free agency ===
Date	Player	Team
June 11, 2015	Janine Weber	New York Riveters
June 23, 2015	Amanda Pelkey	Boston Pride
June 25, 2015	Shiann Darkangelo	Connecticut Whale
June 25, 2015	Sam Faber	Connecticut Whale
June 25, 2015	Chelsea Laden	Connecticut Whale
June 26, 2015	Celeste Brown	New York Riveters
June 30, 2015	Kiira Dosdall	New York Riveters
June 30, 2015	Morgan Fritz-Ward	New York Riveters
July 1, 2015	Kaleigh Fratkin	Connecticut Whale
July 1, 2015	Brianne McLaughlin	Buffalo Beauts
July 2, 2015	Blake Bolden	Boston Pride
July 2, 2015	Jillian Dempsey	Boston Pride
July 2, 2015	Alyssa Gagliardi	Boston Pride
July 6, 2015	Emily Field	Boston Pride
July 6, 2015	Jordan Smelker	Boston Pride
July 9, 2015	Jessica Koizumi	Connecticut Whale
July 9, 2015	Devon Skeats	Buffalo Beauts
July 9, 2015	Danielle Ward	Connecticut Whale
July 9, 2015	Erin Zach	Buffalo Beauts
July 10, 2015	Beth Hanrahan	New York Riveters
July 10, 2015	Brittany Ott	Boston Pride
July 13, 2015	Lindsay Grigg	Buffalo Beauts
July 13, 2015	Kelly McDonald	Buffalo Beauts
July 14, 2015	Madison Packer	New York Riveters
July 17, 2015	Micaela Long	Connecticut Whale
July 17, 2015	Nicole Stock	Connecticut Whale
July 24, 2015	Kelly Cooke	Boston Pride
July 24, 2015	Marissa Gedman	Boston Pride
July 25, 2015	Lyudmila Belyakova	New York Riveters
July 26, 2015	Ashley Johnston	New York Riveters
July 26, 2015	Tara Tomimoto	Connecticut Whale
July 26, 2015	Jaimie Leonoff	Connecticut Whale
July 26, 2015	Shenae Lundberg	New York Riveters
July 27, 2015	Nana Fujimoto	New York Riveters
July 31, 2015	Corinne Buie	Boston Pride
July 31, 2015	Elena Orlando	New York Riveters
August 3, 2015	Meghan Fardelmann	New York Riveters
August 3, 2015	Lauren Slebodnick	Boston Pride
August 4, 2015	Kelly Babstock	Connecticut Whale
August 6, 2015	Harrison Browne	Buffalo Beauts
August 6, 2015	Kimberly Sass	Buffalo Beauts
August 7, 2015	Shelby Bram	Buffalo Beauts
August 7, 2015	Tatiana Rafter	Buffalo Beauts
August 11, 2015	Paige Harrington	Buffalo Beauts
August 11, 2015	Rachel Llanes	Boston Pride
August 11, 2015	Amanda Makela	Buffalo Beauts
August 11, 2015	Jenny Scrivens	New York Riveters
August 11, 2015	Hayley Williams	Buffalo Beauts
August 13, 2015	Brittney Dougherty	Connecticut Whale
August 13, 2015	Shannon Doyle	Connecticut Whale
August 15, 2015	Gabie Figueroa	New York Riveters
August 15, 2015	Kourtney Kunichika	Buffalo Beauts
August 15, 2015	Yekaterina Smolentseva	Connecticut Whale
August 16, 2015	Brooke Ammerman	New York Riveters
August 17, 2015	Jessica Fickel	Buffalo Beauts
August 17, 2015	Kelsie Fralick	Boston Pride
August 17, 2015	Bray Ketchum	New York Riveters
August 18, 2015	Erin Barley-Maloney	New York Riveters
August 18, 2015	Molly Engstrom	Connecticut Whale
August 18, 2015	Zoe Hickel	Boston Pride
August 18, 2015	Hannah McGowan	Buffalo Beauts
September 22, 2015	Kacey Bellamy	Boston Pride
September 23, 2015	Brianna Decker	Boston Pride
September 23, 2015	Gigi Marvin	Boston Pride
September 24, 2015	Lindsay Berman	Connecticut Whale
September 24, 2015	Jordan Brickner	Connecticut Whale
September 24, 2015	Sydney Kidd	New York Riveters
September 24, 2015	Emily Pfalzer	Buffalo Beauts
September 24, 2015	Kelli Stack	Connecticut Whale
September 24, 2015	Alyssa Wohlfeiler	Connecticut Whale
September 25, 2015	Megan Bozek	Buffalo Beauts
September 25, 2015	Meghan Duggan	Buffalo Beauts
September 25, 2015	Hilary Knight	Boston Pride

=== Trades ===
January 27, 2016	To New York Riveters Chelsea Laden	To Connecticut Whale Shenae Lundberg
