= 2016–17 New York Riveters season =

Ice hockey team season

2016–17 New York Riveters
- League: 2nd NWHL
- 2016–17 record: 8–7–3
- Goals for: 55
- Goals against: 58

Team information
- General manager: Chad Wiseman
- Coach: Chad Wiseman
- Arena: Barnabas Health Hockey House

The 2016–17 New York Riveters season is the second in franchise history.

== Offseason ==
On August 1, 2016, it was announced that the Riveters relocated to the Barnabas Health Hockey House in Newark, New Jersey, situated within the Prudential Center. The facility was the site of the first-ever Isobel Cup Finals.

=== Trades ===
January 27, 2016	To Connecticut Whale Haley Skarupa	To New York Riveters Michelle Picard
April 28, 2016	To Connecticut Whale Hannah Brandt	To New York Riveters Dana Trivigno
April 28, 2016	To Boston Pride Alex Carpenter	To New York Riveters Miye D'Oench

=== Signings ===
Player	Date	Contract terms
Bray Ketchum	April 28, 2016	1-year, $15,000
Miye D'Oench	April 28, 2016	1-year, $10,000
Amanda Kessel	May 1, 2016	1-year, $26,000
Kaleigh Fratkin	May 1, 2016	1-year, $19,500
Jaimie Leonoff	May 1, 2016	1-year, $10,000
Courtney Burke	May 5, 2016	1-year, $17,000
Milica McMillen	June 16, 2016	1-year
Sojung Shin	July 27, 2016	1-year, $13,000
Tatiana Rafter	July 31, 2016	1-year, $16,500

== Draft ==
The following were the Riveters selections in the 2016 NWHL Draft on June 18, 2016.

Round	#	Player	Pos	Nationality	College/Junior/Club team (League)
1	1	Kelsey Koelzer	D	United States	Princeton Tigers
2	5	Sydney Daniels	D	United States	Harvard Crimson
3	9	Jenny Ryan	D	United States	Wisconsin Badgers
4	13	Sydney McKibbon	F	Canada	Wisconsin Badgers
5	17	Amy Menke	F	United States	North Dakota Fighting Hawks

== Awards and honors ==
- Amanda Kessel, NWHL All-Star Game MVP
- Janine Weber, NWHL Player of the Week (Awarded February 22, 2017)
