= 2016–17 Connecticut Whale (NWHL) season =

2016–17 Connecticut Whale (PHF)
- League: 4th NWHL
- 2016–17 record: 5–12–1
- Goals for: 60
- Goals against: 77

Team information
- General manager: Lisa Giovanelli
- Coach: Heather Linstad
- Arena: Northford Ice Pavilion

The 2016–17 Connecticut Whale season was the second in franchise history. For their second season, the Whale moved from the Chelsea Piers pavilion in Stamford to the Northford Ice Pavilion (seating capacity 1200), former home of the Quinnipiac Bobcats, in Northford, Connecticut.

== Offseason ==
=== Trades ===
| April 27, 2016 | To New York Riveters Michelle Picard | To Connecticut Whale Haley Skarupa |
| April 28, 2016 | To New York Riveters Hannah Brandt | To Connecticut Whale Dana Trivigno |

=== Free agents ===
| Player | Acquired from | Lost to | Date | Contract terms |
|---|---|---|---|---|
| Kaleigh Fratkin | | New York Riveters | May 1, 2016 | 1-year, $19,500 |
| Jaimie Leonoff | | New York Riveters | May 1, 2016 | 1-year, $10,000 |
| Kaliya Johnson | Boston College | | May 2, 2016 | 1-year, $13,000 |
| Cydney Roesler | Quinnipiac University | | May 3, 2016 | 1-year, $15,500 |
| Nicole Connery | Quinnipiac University | | May 3, 2016 | 1-year, $15,000 |
| Nicole Kosta | Quinnipiac University | | May 3, 2016 | 1-year, $15,000 |
| Meagan Mangene | Boston Pride | | July 28, 2016 | 1-year, $12,000 |
| Ivana Bilic | Bemidji State University | | July 31, 2016 | 1-year, $14,000 |

=== Signings ===
| Player | Date | Contract terms |
|---|---|---|
| Kelly Babstock | April 4, 2016 | 1-year, $21,000 |
| Sam Faber | April 30, 2016 | 1-year, $13,000 |
| Jessica Koizumi | May 11, 2016 | 1-year, $14,000 |
| Shenae Lundberg | May 13, 2016 | 1-year, $15,000 |

== Draft ==
The following were the Whale's selections in the 2016 NWHL Draft on June 18, 2016.

| Round | # | Player | Pos | Nationality | College/Junior/Club team (League) |
|---|---|---|---|---|---|
| 1 | 3 | Dani Cameranesi | F | (United States) | Minnesota (WCHA) |
| 2 | 7 | Andie Anastos | F | (United States) | Boston College (Hockey East) |
| 3 | 11 | Melissa Channell | D | (Canada) | Wisconsin Badgers (WCHA) |
| 4 | 15 | Paige Savage | F | (United States) | Northeastern (HEA) |
| 5 | 19 | Sydney Rossman | G | (United States) | Quinnipiac Bobcats (ECAC) |
