= Jordan Brickner =

American ice hockey player

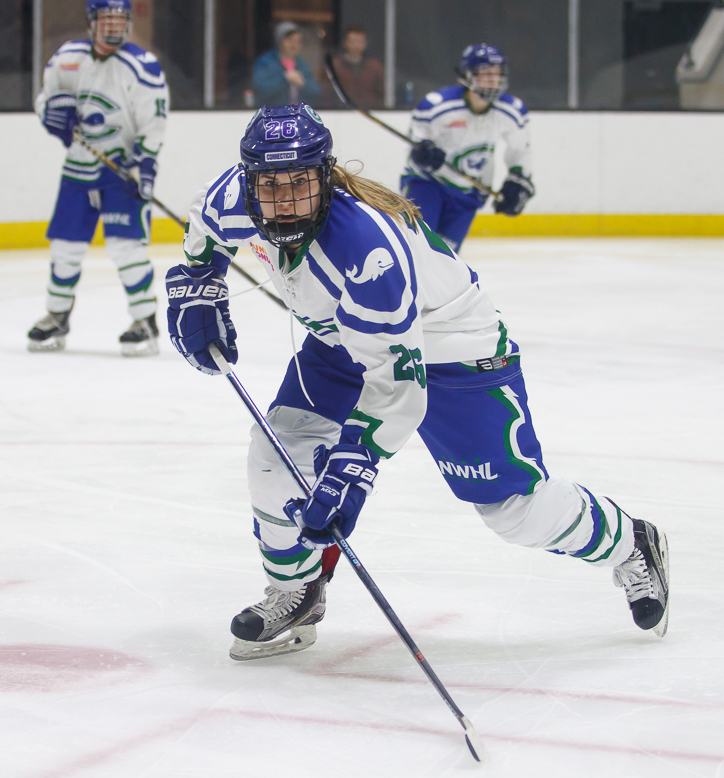
- Brickner with the Connecticut Whale in 2018
- Born: October 3, 1990 (age 35) Lake Forest, Illinois, United States
- Height: 5 ft 9 in (175 cm)
- Position: Defense
- Shot: Left
- Played for: Connecticut Whale; Ladies Team Lugano; DEC Salzburg Eagles; Wisconsin Badgers; Colgate Raiders
- Playing career: 2009–2020

Jordan Brickner Gragnano (born October 3, 1990) is an American former ice hockey player. She most recently played with the Connecticut Whale in the 2019–20 season of the Premier Hockey Federation (formerly the NWHL). In 2020, she was honored with the NWHL Foundation Award.

== Career ==
Growing up, Brickner played on both boys' and girls' teams until she reached high school. She then attended the Hotchkiss School in Connecticut, where she played for the school's varsity girls' hockey team, serving as the team's co-captain in her senior year. During high school, she also played for the Connecticut Stars of the Connecticut Hockey Conference.

In 2009, she began studying at Colgate University, where she played for the Raiders women's ice hockey programme. In 2011, she transferred to the University of Wisconsin and played her final two years of college eligibility with the Badgers women's ice hockey program. Brickner finished her collegiate career with a total of 43 points in 140 NCAA Division I games. She was named to the All-WCHA Academic Team in 2013.

After graduating, she moved to Austria to play for DEC Salzburg Eagles in the European Women's Hockey League. After one year in Austria, she moved to Switzerland to play for HC Lugano of the Swiss Women's Hockey League A (SWHL A).

When Dani Rylan founded the National Women's Hockey League in 2015, Brickner returned to North America to sign with the NWHL's Connecticut Whale. She scored 12 points in 18 games in the NWHL's debut season, being named to the 1st NWHL All-Star Game.

After scoring seven points in the first ten games of the 2019–20 season, she was sidelined due to injury and missed the rest of the season. Hanna Beattie was named as her replacement for the 2020 NWHL All-Star Game. She was named a recipient of the 2020 NWHL Foundation Award for her contributions to growing and improving hockey culture.

In August 2020, she re-signed with the Whale for the 2020–21 NWHL season. She was the 100th player to sign for the season; however, she would not end up playing. A consistent top-pairing defenceman for the Whale, she was ninth on the league's all-time games played list at the time of her last game.

== Career statistics ==
			Regular season					Playoffs
Season	Team	League	GP	G	A	Pts	PIM	GP	G	A	Pts	PIM
2009-10	Colgate Raiders	NCAA	34	6	9	15	2	-	-	-	-	-
2010-11	Colgate Raiders	NCAA	31	1	7	8	10	-	-	-	-	-
2011-12	Wisconsin Badgers	NCAA	40	2	9	11	0	-	-	-	-	-
2012-13	Wisconsin Badgers	NCAA	35	3	6	9	0	-	-	-	-	-
2013-14	DEC Salzburg Eagles	EWHL	18	22	17	39	6	-	-	-	-	-
2013-14	DEC Salzburg Eagles	DEBL	0	0	0	0	0	4	4	0	4	0
2014-15	Ladies Team Lugano	SWHL A	18	6	9	15	12	8	2	4	6	2
2015-16	Connecticut Whale	NWHL	18	0	12	12	2	3	0	0	0	0
2016-17	Connecticut Whale	NWHL	14	1	3	4	2	1	0	1	1	0
2017-18	Connecticut Whale	NWHL	15	1	1	2	2	1	0	0	0	0
2018-19	Connecticut Whale	NWHL	13	0	1	1	2	1	0	1	1	0
2019-20	Connecticut Whale	NWHL	10	1	6	7	6	-	-	-	-	-
NCAA totals			140	12	31	43	12	-	-	-	-	-
EWHL totals			18	22	17	39	6	-	-	-	-	-
SWHL A totals			18	6	9	15	12	8	2	4	6	2
NWHL totals			70	3	23	26	14	6	0	2	2	0

== Honours and achievements ==
=== SWHL-A ===
- 2014-2015 : Champion with Ladies Team Lugano

=== NWHL ===
2015-2016 : All-Star Game 2019-2020 : Foundation Award

== See also ==
- List of Connecticut Whale (PHF) records
