= Kate Leary =

American ice hockey forward (born 1993)

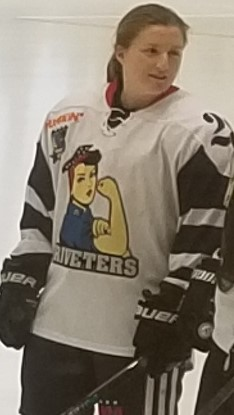
- Kate Leary playing for the Metro Riveters 10-27-19
- Born: August 10, 1993 (age 33) Seabrook, New Hampshire, United States
- Height: 157 cm (5 ft 2 in)
- Weight: 61 kg (134 lb; 9 st 8 lb)
- Position: Forward (ice hockey)
- Shoots: Right
- PHF team: Metropolitan Riveters
- Played for: Boston Blades, HC Lugano, Boston College Eagles
- Playing career: 2016–present

Kate Leary (born August 10, 1993) is an American ice hockey forward, currently playing for the Metropolitan Riveters of the Premier Hockey Federation.

== Career ==
Across four seasons with Boston College Eagles women's icy hockey, Leary never missed a game, and was awarded the Athletic Director’s Award for Academic Achievement Honours in her sophomore season.

Leary's rookie season in the CWHL came the year the formation of the NWHL, which saw many star players switch leagues. Joining the CWHL, Leary quickly became one of the top scorers for the Boston Blades, scoring ten goals and six assists in 24 games, almost a third of the team's goals, and the highest scoring American player in the league.

After two years in the CWHL, Leary left to play for HC Lugano in Switzerland, where she scored 33 goals in 20 games, and was the league's leading scorer, and won the league championship.

After just one year in Switzerland, Leary returned to North America, signing with the Riveters of the NWHL. In her first season, she put up 27 points in 22 games, and was named to Team Packer for the All-Star Game.

== Personal life ==
Leary has also competitively played lacrosse and field hockey. She grew up in the Boston area, graduating from Governor’s Academy in Byfield.

Outside of sports, Leary has a degree in psychology.

== Career statistics ==
			Regular season					Playoffs
Season	Team	League	GP	G	A	Pts	PIM	GP	G	A	Pts	PIM
2016-17	Boston Blades	CWHL	24	10	6	16	6	-	-	-	-	-
2017-18	Boston Blades	CWHL	28	8	9	17	18	-	-	-	-	-
2018-19	HC Lugano	SWHL A	20	33	16	49	16	7	6	6	12	8
2019-20	Metropolitan Riveters	NWHL	22	16	11	27	6	1	0	0	0	0
2019-20	Metropolitan Riveters	NWHL	3	0	1	1	0	-	-	-	-	-
CWHL totals			52	18	15	33	24	-	-	-	-	-
NWHL totals			25	16	12	28	6	1	0	0	0	0
