= Hanna Beattie =

American ice hockey forward

- Born: June 1, 1995 (age 30) Whitehouse Station, New Jersey, U.S.
- Height: 173 cm (5 ft 8 in)
- Position: Forward/Defender
- Shoots: Left
- PHF team Former teams: Connecticut Whale; Williams College
- Playing career: 2017–present

Hanna Beattie (born June 1, 1995) is an American ice hockey forward, currently playing for the Connecticut Whale in the Premier Hockey Federation (PHF).

== Career ==
Across 103 games with Williams College, Beattie put up 56 points. In 2014, she was named NESCAC Rookie of the Year and first team All American defender. She was named to the 2015 New England Hockey Writers Division II-III All-Star team.

In 2017, she signed her first professional contract with the Connecticut Whale. After failing to score any points in her first two seasons with the Whale, she would score 6 points in 22 games in the 2019–20 NWHL season. She was named to the 2020 NWHL All-Star Game as a replacement for Jordan Brickner.

== Career statistics ==
| | | | Regular season | | | | | Playoffs |
| Season | Team | League | GP | G | A | Pts | PIM | GP | G | A | Pts | PIM |
|---|---|---|---|---|---|---|---|---|---|---|---|---|
| 2017-18 | Connecticut Whale | PHF | 12 | 0 | 0 | 0 | 0 | 1 | 0 | 0 | 0 | 0 |
| 2018-19 | Connecticut Whale | PHF | 16 | 0 | 0 | 0 | 6 | 1 | 0 | 0 | 0 | 0 |
| 2019-20 | Connecticut Whale | PHF | 22 | 3 | 3 | 6 | 18 | 2 | 2 | 0 | 2 | 2 |
| PHF totals | | | 50 | 3 | 3 | 6 | 24 | 4 | 2 | 0 | 2 | 2 |
