= 2019–20 NWHL season =

- League: National Women's Hockey League
- Sport: Ice hockey

Regular season
- Season champions: Boston Pride
- Season MVP: Jillian Dempsey (Boston); Allie Thunstrom (Minnesota)
- Top scorer: Jillian Dempsey (Boston)

Isobel Cup
- Champions: Not awarded due to COVID-19 pandemic

NWHL seasons
- 2018–19 2020–21

The 2019–20 NWHL season was the fifth season of the National Women's Hockey League. All five teams from the previous season returned: the Boston Pride, Buffalo Beauts, Connecticut Whale, Metropolitan Riveters, and the Minnesota Whitecaps.

The NWHL completed the semifinal round of the 2020 Isobel Cup playoffs, but had to postpone the championship game between Boston and Minnesota originally scheduled for March 13, 2020, due to the ongoing COVID-19 pandemic. On May 15, the final was cancelled and the Isobel Cup was not awarded.

== League changes ==
=== 2019 offseason events ===
Following the 2018–19 season, the Canadian Women's Hockey League (CWHL) ceased operations citing the fragmentation of corporate sponsors between the CWHL and NWHL caused their league to be financially infeasible. The NWHL then announced it was pursuing adding two CWHL markets to the league, Montreal and Toronto, if the NWHL found financial backers for the teams.

On May 2, 2019, over 200 players from both the CWHL and NWHL released a joint statement announcing their intent to not participate in any North American professional league for the 2019–20 season citing their dissatisfaction in the operations of both leagues in that neither provided health insurance or a livable salary. The NWHL responded with that they were pursuing many more sponsors than in previous years and hoped to increase player salaries. and agreed to give players a 50 percent split of revenue on league sponsorship and media deals. On May 20, 2019, the players formed a worker's union called the Professional Women's Hockey Player Association (PWHPA) to further push for their stated goals of a league that provides financial and infrastructure resources to players, health insurance, and support to training programs for young female players. With a large number of North American players boycotting the league, more than half of the signed players on opening rosters were new to the league.

On May 8, 2019, Pegula Sports and Entertainment (PSE), the owners of the Buffalo Beauts, relinquished ownership and operations of the team back to the NWHL, but continued to claim rights to the Beauts name as part of the turnover. The Beauts then changed their home venue from the PSE-owned Harborcenter to the Northtown Center in the Buffalo suburb of Amherst.

On May 17, 2019, the New Jersey Devils ended their partnership with the Metropolitan Riveters. The Riveters then changed their home venue from the Devils' practice rink to ProSkate Ice Arena in Monmouth Junction, New Jersey, and returned to their original jersey colors.

With the player strike, loss of support from the NHL teams, and lack of additional investors, the NWHL announced they would not be able to increase to full-time salaries or provide players with health insurance outside of the typical worker's compensation for injuries, but had come to an agreement to a 50 percent revenue split on all league-wide sponsorship and media deals. In addition, the league also stated they would not add Montreal and Toronto for the 2019–20 season. The league announced a longer 2019–20 season for the teams, going from 16 to 24 games.

Also during the offseason, the Connecticut Whale relocated to Danbury, Connecticut, and the Boston Pride were purchased by a group of investors led by Miles Arnone.

=== Head coach changes ===
Team	2018–19 head coach	2019–20 replacement	Notes
Connecticut Whale	Ryan Equale	Colton Orr	Orr was named head coach of the Whale on September 17, 2019. The Whale had relocated to Danbury Ice Arena during the offseason and Orr operates hockey clinics and a junior team out of the arena.
Buffalo Beauts	Cody McCormick	Pete Perram	McCormick, a former player for the Buffalo Sabres, was named the head coach for in December the previous season. After the Beauts' split from the association with the Sabres and were returned to a league-operated team, Pete Perram was hired as the next head coach.
Metropolitan Riveters	Randy Velischek	Ivo Mocek	After the split with the New Jersey Devils, the Riveters hired former Czech junior national team player Ivo Mocek on August 12, 2019.

== Regular season ==
=== Standings ===
Final standings.

	GP	W	L	OTL	PTS	GF	GA
Boston Pride	24	23	1	0	46	120	43
Minnesota Whitecaps	24	17	5	2	36	106	52
Metropolitan Riveters	24	10	11	3	23	70	91
Buffalo Beauts	24	8	15	1	17	71	116
Connecticut Whale	24	2	20	2	6	39	100

=== Schedule ===
Regular season schedule
Date	Visitor	Score	Home	OT	Decision	Notes
October 5	Buffalo	3–1	Connecticut		Mariah Fujimagari	
October 5	Boston	4–2	Metropolitan		Lovisa Selander	
October 12	Metropolitan	2–9	Minnesota		Amanda Leveille	
October 12	Buffalo	2–4	Boston		Lovisa Selander	
October 13	Buffalo	1–8	Boston		Lovisa Selander	
October 13	Metropolitan	4–3	Minnesota	OT	Sam Walther	
October 19	Connecticut	4–5	Buffalo	OT	Mariah Fujimagari	
October 19	Minnesota	1–3	Boston		Lovisa Selander	
October 20	Connecticut	4–6	Buffalo		Mariah Fujimagari	
October 20	Minnesota	2–5	Boston		Lovisa Selander	
October 26	Minnesota	7–2	Connecticut		Amanda Leveille	
October 26	Metropolitan	2–7	Boston		Lovisa Selander	
October 27	Minnesota	3–2	Connecticut		Amanda Leveille	
October 27	Metropolitan	3–5	Boston		Lovisa Selander	
November 16	Buffalo	1–6	Boston		Lovisa Selander	
November 17	Buffalo	3–1	Connecticut		Kelsey Neumann	
November 23	Connecticut	0–8	Boston		Victoria Hanson	
November 23	Minnesota	5–3	Buffalo		Amanda Leveille	
November 24	Minnesota	3–4	Buffalo		Mariah Fujimagari	
November 30	Buffalo	6–2	Connecticut		Kelsey Neumann	
November 30	Metropolitan	2–5	Boston		Lovisa Selander	
December 1	Metropolitan	2–1	Connecticut		Sam Walther	
December 7	Boston	8–3	Metropolitan		Victoria Hanson	
December 8	Metropolitan	3–2	Connecticut		Sam Walther	
December 14	Metropolitan	3–2	Minnesota	SO	Sam Walther	
December 15	Metropolitan	2–5	Minnesota		Amanda Leveille	
December 21	Minnesota	3–0	Connecticut		Amanda Leveille	
December 21	Boston	4–3	Buffalo	OT	Lovisa Selander	
December 22	Boston	4–2	Buffalo		Victoria Hanson	
December 22	Minnesota	2–1	Connecticut		Amanda Leveille	
December 28	Boston	2–1	Connecticut	SO	Lovisa Selander	
December 28	Metropolitan	7–4	Buffalo		Sam Walther	Outdoor game at Buffalo RiverWorks.
December 29	Metropolitan	6–3	Buffalo		Sam Walther	
December 29	Boston	7–2	Connecticut		Victoria Hanson	
January 4	Minnesota	2–0	Metropolitan		Amanda Leveille	
January 4	Boston	5–2	Buffalo		Victoria Hanson	
January 5	Boston	7–2	Buffalo		Lovisa Selander	
January 5	Minnesota	1–3	Metropolitan		Sam Walther	
January 11	Connecticut	4–3	Metropolitan	OT	Brooke Wolejko	
January 11	Buffalo	2–8	Minnesota		Amanda Leveille	
January 12	Buffalo	1–7	Minnesota		Amanda Leveille	
January 12	Connecticut	2–4	Boston		Lovisa Selander	
January 18	Connecticut	1–6	Minnesota		Amanda Leveille	
January 19	Connecticut	0–7	Minnesota		Amanda Leveille	
January 20	Metropolitan	3–5	Boston		Victoria Hanson	
January 25	Connecticut	2–1	Metropolitan	SO	Brooke Wolejko	
January 25	Boston	3–4	Minnesota		Amanda Leveille	
January 26	Boston	4–2	Minnesota		Lovisa Selander	
January 26	Connecticut	2–4	Metropolitan		Sam Walther; Dana DeMartino	
February 15	Connecticut	1–4	Boston		Lovisa Selander	
February 15	Buffalo	6–5	Metropolitan	SO	Tiffany Hsu	
February 16	Buffalo	3–4	Metropolitan		Dana DeMartino	
February 22	Minnesota	6–1	Buffalo		Amanda Leveille	
February 22	Boston	3–0	Connecticut		Lovisa Selander	At Webster Bank Arena in Bridgeport, Connecticut, as a double-header with the AHL's Bridgeport Sound Tigers
February 23	Minnesota	9–3	Buffalo		Allie Morse	
February 23	Boston	5–0	Metropolitan		Lovisa Selander	
February 29	Buffalo	2–5	Metropolitan		Sam Walther	
February 29	Connecticut	3–6	Minnesota		Amanda Leveille	
March 1	Connecticut	1–3	Minnesota		Amanda Leveille	
March 1	Buffalo	3–1	Metropolitan		Lea-Kristine Demers	

== Playoffs ==
Play-in game March 6
4	Buffalo	3
5	Connecticut	5

Semifinal game March 8
1	Boston	5
5	Connecticut	1
2	Minnesota	1
3	Metropolitan	0

Isobel Cup Championship; Cancelled (Note: Cancelled due the COVID-19 pandemic.)
1	Boston	—
2	Minnesota	—

== All-Star Game ==
The 2020 NWHL All-Star Game and its weekend festivities took place on February 8–9, 2020, at Warrior Ice Arena, the Boston Pride's home arena. The teams were captained by Jillian Dempsey of the Boston Pride and Madison Packer of the Metropolitan Riveters, who drafted their rosters from the selected all-star players in a draft.

The skills challenge took place on February 8. Team Packer won the fastest skater (Grace Kleinbach of Connecticut) and hardest shot (Kaleigh Fratkin of Boston), while Team Dempsey won fastest goalie (Mariah Fujimagari of Buffalo), shooting accuracy (Jillian Dempsey), and the team relay. Team Packer ultimately won the skills competition via the team shootout competition. On February 11, the league awarded fastest skater to Team Dempsey's Allie Thunstrom of the Minnesota Whitecaps following a review and a timing error.

The All-Star Game took place the following day on February 9. The game was a four-on-four format with Team Dempsey winning 5–2. The game was sold out in the 800-seat arena and had about 10,000 viewers watching the game live on Twitch.

== Awards and honors ==
- Jillian Dempsey (Boston Pride) and Allie Thunstrom (Minnesota Whitecaps), 2020 Most Valuable Players
- Lovisa Selander, Boston Pride, 2020 Goaltender of the Year
- Kaleigh Fratkin, Boston Pride, 2020 Defender of the Year
- Jillian Dempsey, Boston Pride, 2020 Scoring Champion
- Kate Leary, Metropolitan Riveters, 2020 Newcomer of the Year
