= Micaela Long =

American ice hockey player

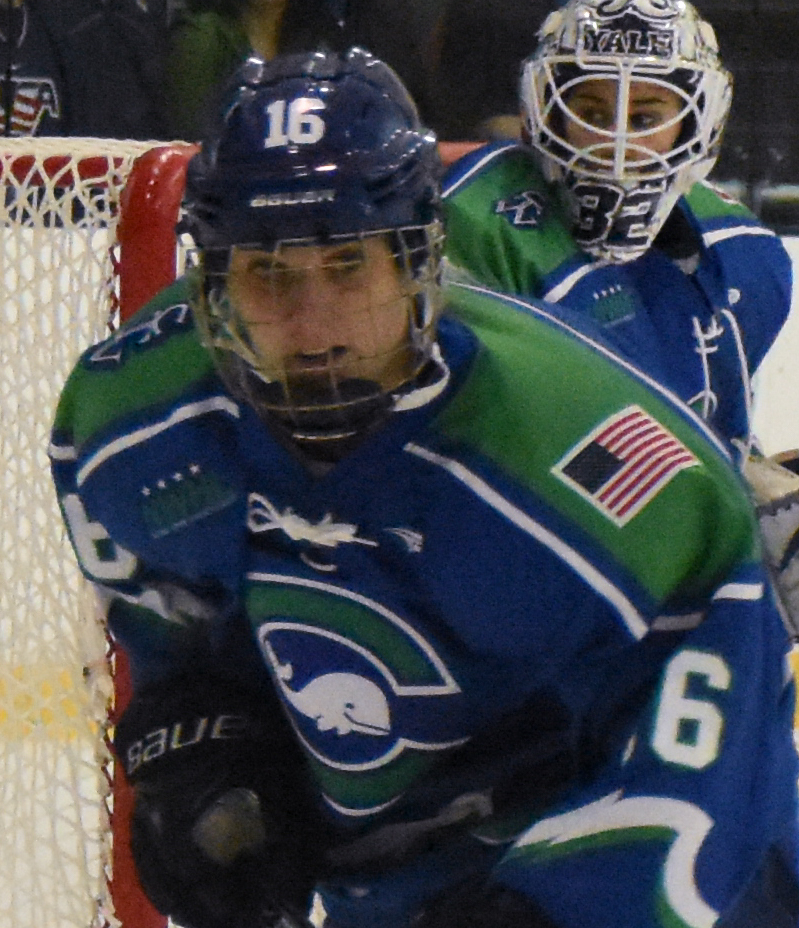
- Long (front) in 2015
- Born: 16 November 1987 (age 38) South Boston, Massachusetts, US
- Height: 5 ft 4.5 in (164 cm)
- Position: Forward
- Shot: Left
- Played for: Connecticut Whale, Boston Blades
- Playing career: 2010–2017

Micaela Long (born November 16, 1987) is an American professional ice hockey player, most recently for the Connecticut Whale of the Premier Hockey Federation (PHF). Long previously played for the Boston Blades of the Canadian Women's Hockey League (CWHL).

== Personal life ==
Between 2006 and 2010, Long played in the NCAA for the University of New Hampshire.

In addition to her playing career, Long works as a teacher at the American School for the Deaf.

Long married Alex Desjarlais on July 29, 2021, in a private New Hampshire wedding on Lake Winnepesaukee. The couple currently resides in Connecticut.

== Playing career ==
=== CWHL ===
Long played in the 2010/2011 and 2011/12 CWHL seasons with the Boston Blades.

=== Premier Hockey Federation ===
On 17 July 2015, it was announced that Long would be joining the Connecticut Whale for the PHF's inaugural season. Long appeared in 17 regular season games and two playoff games for the franchise in their 2015–16 season.

In July 2016, Long signed a one-year, $13,500 contract to continue with the Connecticut Whale for the 2016–17 NWHL season. During the first NWHL game of 2016, a hit by Long on New York Riveters captain Ashley Johnston sparked a line brawl between the New York Riveters and Connecticut Whale. Long and Riveters player Elena Orlando were each subsequently suspended for one game by the NWHL's Player Safety Committee.
