= Victoria Hanson =

American ice hockey player (born 1994)

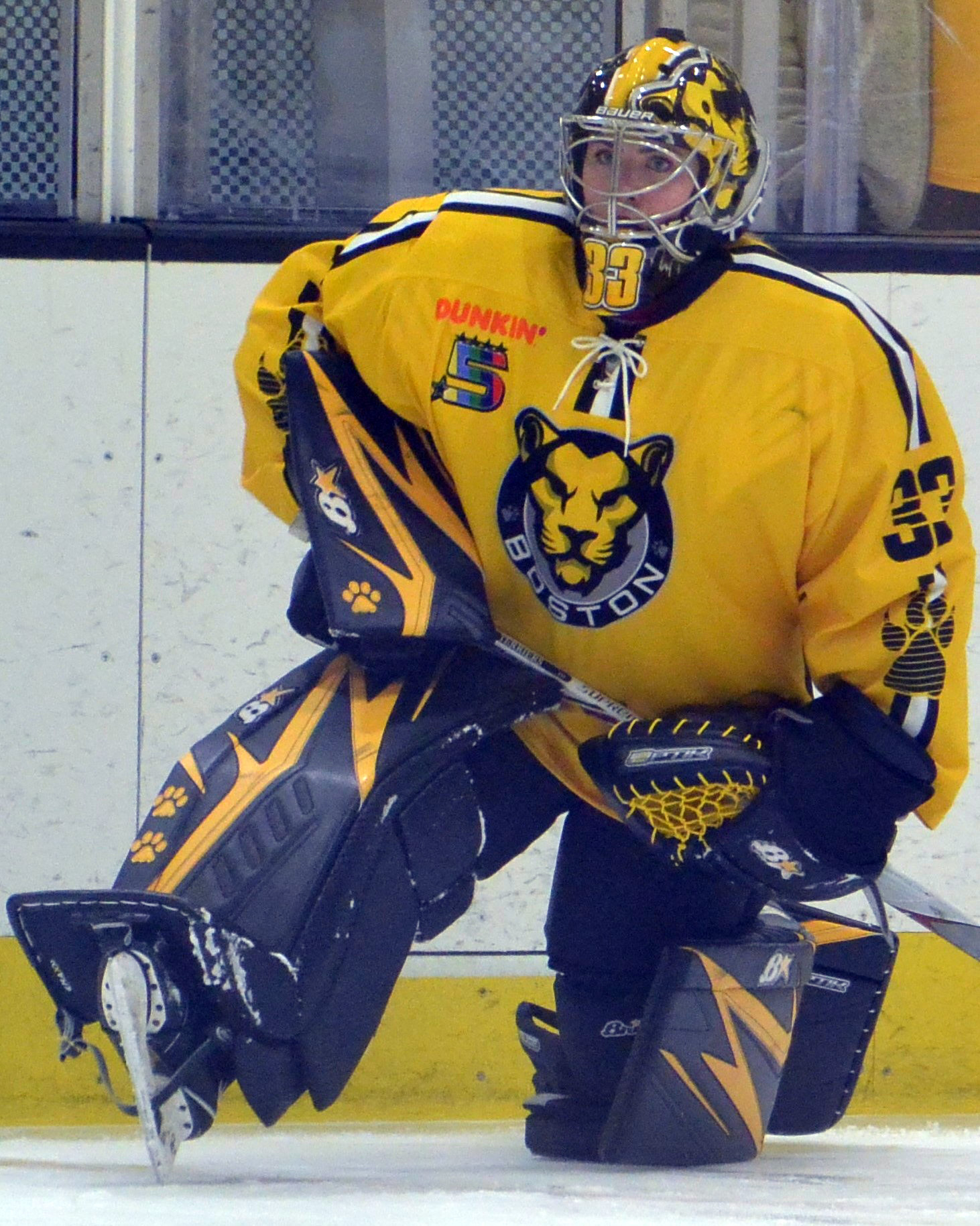
- Victoria Hanson playing for the Boston Pride 11-28-19
- Born: October 1, 1994 (age 31) Stoughton, Massachusetts, United States
- Height: 175 cm (5 ft 9 in)
- Position: Goaltender
- PHF team: Boston Pride
- Played for: Kurpfalz Ladies; Boston University
- Playing career: 2013–present

Victoria Hanson is an American ice hockey goaltender, currently playing with the Boston Pride of the Premier Hockey Federation (PHF).

== Career ==
From 2013 to 2017, she attended Boston University. She was named a Hockey East First Team All-Star in her senior year, the first goalie from the university to be named to the first all star team in a decade.

After graduating, she moved to Germany to sign with the Mad Dogs Mannheim, serving as the team's starting goaltender. She would only play a season with Mannheim before returning to North America and stepping away from competitive hockey for the 2018–19 season.

She returned to professional play in 2019 to sign with the PHF's Boston Pride, serving as the team's backup goaltender behind Lovisa Selander. She went 6–0 in her rookie NWHL season, posting a .919 save percentage and 1.97 GAA, including her first professional shutout in a victory over the Connecticut Whale, as the Pride made it to the Isobel Cup finals before the year was cancelled due to the COVID-19 pandemic in the United States. She re-signed with the Pride for the 2020–21 NWHL season, with general manager Karilyn Pilch stating that she was "a fierce competitor and an excellent technical goalie."

== Personal life ==
At Boston University, Hanson was enrolled in the Questrom School of Business, earning a bachelor's degree in business administration and management. Her father, Mark Hanson, played as a goaltender for Providence College in the 70s, and served as a goaltending coach for Harvard University until 2018, and her sister, Elizabeth Hanson, played as a goaltender for Elmira College from 2017 to 2020.

== Career statistics ==
| | | | Regular season | | | | | | | | | Playoffs |
| Season | Team | League | GP | W | L | T/OT | MIN | GA | SO | GAA | SV% | GP | W | L | MIN | GA | SO | GAA | SV% |
|---|---|---|---|---|---|---|---|---|---|---|---|---|---|---|---|---|---|---|---|
| 2013–14 | Boston University | NCAA | 6 | 3 | 2 | 0 | 336 | 15 | 0 | 2.68 | .910 | — | — | — | — | — | — | — | — |
| 2014–15 | Boston University | NCAA | 23 | 16 | 5 | 2 | 1332 | 50 | 0 | 2.25 | .910 | — | — | — | — | — | — | — | — |
| 2015–16 | Boston University | NCAA | 12 | 6 | 6 | 0 | 656 | 35 | 0 | 3.20 | .888 | — | — | — | — | — | — | — | — |
| 2016–17 | Boston University | NCAA | 28 | 15 | 9 | 4 | 1693 | 67 | 2 | 2.37 | .927 | — | — | — | — | — | — | — | — |
| 2017–18 | Kurpfalz Ladies | Fraueneishockey-Bundesliga | 20 | — | — | — | — | — | — | 4.09 | — | — | — | — | — | — | — | — | — |
| 2019–20 | Boston Pride | PHF | 8 | 6 | 0 | 0 | 396 | 13 | 1 | 1.97 | .919 | — | — | — | — | — | — | — | — |
| PHF totals | | | 8 | 6 | 0 | 0 | 396 | 13 | 1 | 1.97 | .919 | — | — | — | — | — | — | — | — |
