= Mariah Fujimagari =

Canadian ice hockey goaltender

- Born: 17 April 1994 (age 31) Markham, Ontario, Canada
- Height: 180 cm (5 ft 11 in)
- Position: Goaltender
- Catches: Left
- ECHL team Former teams: Kalamazoo Wings (PTO): AIK Hockey; Connecticut Whale; Buffalo Beauts; Worcester Blades; HC ŠKP Bratislava; Maine Black Bears
- Playing career: 2013–present

Mariah Fujimagari (born 17 April 1994) is a Canadian ice hockey goaltender, currently an unrestricted free agent

== Career ==
In her youth career, she was OFSAA 'AAAA' Champion 2012 and MVP, and captained the boy's U18 Maine Freeze team.

She played college ice hockey with the Maine Black Bears women's ice hockey program in the Hockey East (HEA) conference of the NCAA Division I during 2013 to 2017. In her third season with the university, the 2015–16 season, she was named to the Hockey East All-Academic Team.

Fujimagari played for HC ŠKP Bratislava in both the Elite Women's Hockey League (EWHL) and the Slovak Women's Extraliga during the 2017–18 season, leading the Extraliga in save percentage and goals against average. After just one year in Slovakia, she signed for the Worcester Blades in the Canadian Women's Hockey League, where she would play one season before the league folded.

During her rookie season in the National Women's Hockey League (NWHL; renamed PHF in 2021), Fujimagari was named to Team Dempsey for the All-Star Game, and was named the fastest skating goalie of the league.

Fujimagari played the 2022–23 season in the Swedish Women's Hockey League (SDHL) with AIK Hockey Dam.

In 2023, she signed a professional tryout agreement with the Kalamazoo Wings of the ECHL, a mid-level professional ice hockey team.

== Personal life ==
Fujimagari was a figure skater until she turned 12.

She has a degree in food science from the University of Maine.
