= Kate Buesser =

American ice hockey player (born 1989)

Kate Buesser (born April 23, 1989) is an American women's ice hockey forward with the Connecticut Whale of the Premier Hockey Federation (PHF). At the NCAA level, she accumulated 92 points with the Harvard Crimson women's ice hockey program from 2008 to 2012.

== Playing career ==
=== CWHL ===
Buesser competed with the Boston Blades and captured the 2013 Clarkson Cup championship. In 2014, she would appear in the finals of the 2014 Clarkson Cup with the Blades, only to be defeated in overtime by the Toronto Furies.

=== Premier Hockey Federation ===
On December 31, 2015, Buesser was one of three Connecticut Whale players (including Shannon Doyle and Kaleigh Fratkin) that were loaned to the Boston Pride. The three donned the Pride jerseys for one day and participated in the 2015 Women's Winter Classic, the first outdoor professional women's hockey game.

== Awards and honors ==
- 2009–10 New England Hockey Writers All-Star Team
- 2013 Clarkson Cup All-Star Team
