= Shannon Turner (ice hockey) =

Canadian ice hockey player

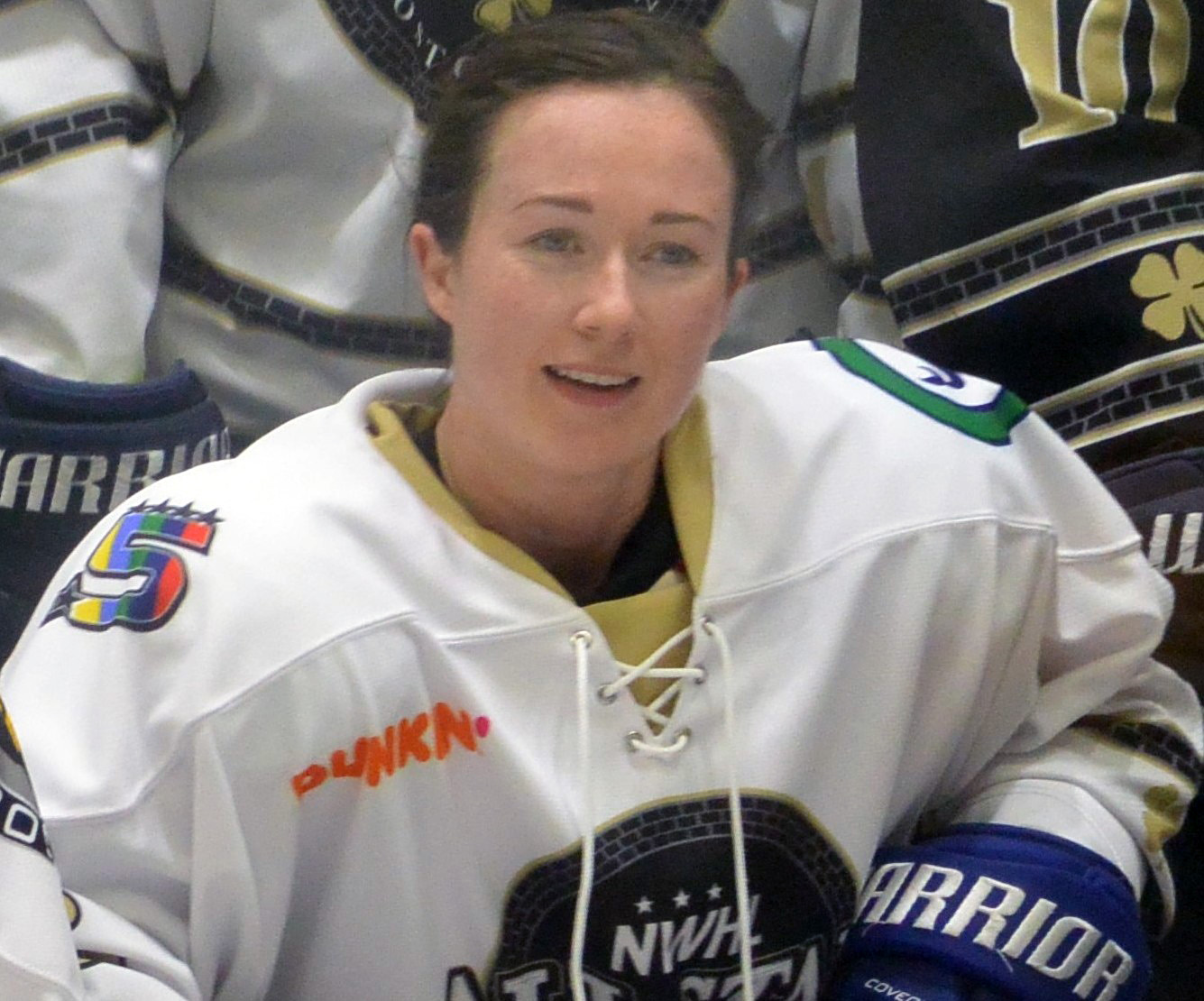
- Turner at the 2020 NWHL All Star Game
- Born: March 6, 1992 (age 34) Markham, Ontario, Canada
- Height: 5 ft 4 in (163 cm)
- Position: Defense
- Shot: Right
- PHF team Former teams: Connecticut Whale: →Boston Pride (loan); Boston Terriers (NCAA); Colgate Raiders (NCAA)
- Playing career: 2015–2023
Medal record
Women's ice hockey
Representing Canada
World U18 Championships
Gold medal – first place	2010 United States

Shannon Turner née Doyle (born March 6, 1992) is a retired Canadian ice hockey player. She served as captain of the Connecticut Whale of the Premier Hockey Federation (PHF).

== Playing career ==
=== NCAA ===
At the NCAA level, Turner accumulated 25 points with the Colgate Raiders women's ice hockey program from 2010 to 2012, and 53 points with the Boston University Terriers women's ice hockey program over the course of two seasons, 2012–13 and 2014–15 (she missed the 2013-14 season due to injury). During her time with the Boston University Terriers, the program would win four consecutive Hockey East championships (2012–15). In the aftermath of the 2015 Hockey East tournament, Turner joined Kayla Tutino and captain Marie-Philip Poulin on the All-Tournament Team.

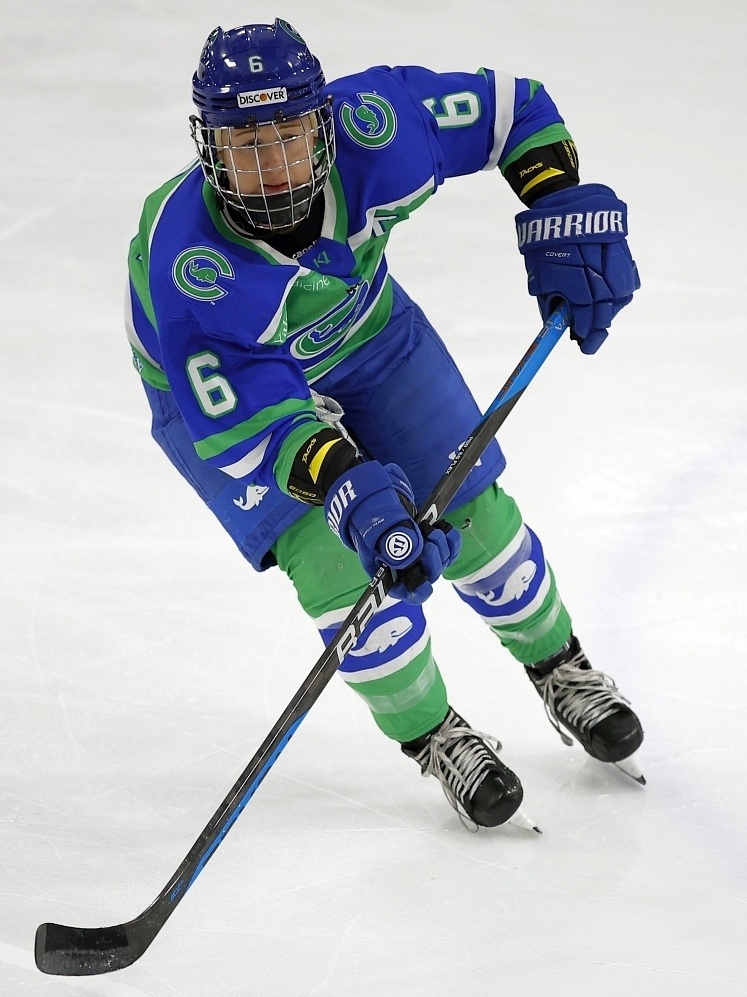
Turner with the Whale in 2023

=== Premier Hockey Federation ===
On December 31, 2015, Turner was one of three Connecticut Whale players (including Kate Buesser and Kaleigh Fratkin that were loaned to the Boston Pride. The three donned the Pride jerseys for one day and participated in the 2015 Women's Winter Classic, the first outdoor professional women’s hockey game. She was named to the 2019 and 2020 NWHL All-Star Games.

She was named team captain for the Whale ahead of the 2019-20 season. She announced in June 2020 that the 2020-21 NWHL season would probably be her last in professional hockey. However, she pushed back her planned retirement and re-signed with the Whale in October 2021.

In October 2022, the Whale announced that Turner had signed an additional one-season contract and would captain the team for the 2022–23 PHF season. Turner retired following the 2023 Isobel Cup playoffs.

== Personal life ==
Outside of hockey, Turner teaches English at Greenwich Country Day School. She has a Master's degree in British literature.

== Career statistics ==
			Regular season					Playoffs
Season	Team	League	GP	G	A	Pts	PIM	GP	G	A	Pts	PIM
2015-16	Connecticut Whale	NWHL	18	2	3	5	12	3	0	1	1	2
2016-17	Connecticut Whale	NWHL	15	0	7	7	22	-	-	-	-	-
2017-18	Connecticut Whale	NWHL	15	0	5	5	20	1	0	0	0	4
2018-19	Connecticut Whale	NWHL	13	3	5	8	10	1	0	1	1	2
2019-20	Connecticut Whale	NWHL	24	2	9	11	36	2	0	0	0	7
2020-21	Connecticut Whale	NWHL	4	0	2	2	0	1	0	0	0	0
2021-22	Connecticut Whale	PHF	20	2	5	7	10	2	0	2	2	2
2022-23	Connecticut Whale	PHF	23	0	7	7	12	3	0	2	2	4
NWHL/PHF totals			132	9	43	52	122	13	0	6	6	21

== Awards and honours ==
- Colgate Raiders Rookie of the Year (2010–11)
- PHF Foundation Award (2021–22)
