= Nicole Stock =

American ice hockey player

- Position: Goaltender
- Catches: Left
- NCAA NWHL team: Brown Bears women's ice hockey Connecticut Whale
- Playing career: 2003–present

Nicole Stock is an American-born women's ice hockey player. Having played NCAA hockey with the Brown Bears, she was a goaltender with the NWHL's Connecticut Whale. Of note, she was selected to play in the 2017 All-Star Game.

== Playing career ==
Raised in Buffalo Grove, Illinois, Stock played at the prep school level with Choate Rosemary Hall, contributing towards the program capturing several New England Prep School Championships. In 2004, Stock would capture a national championship with the Connecticut Polar Bears.

During the 2007–08 season, Stock set a new Brown Bears women's ice hockey record for most saves in a season with 1,004, surpassing the old record set by former Patty Kazmaier Award winner Ali Brewer. She also set records for most saves in one game with 66 and in a period (27), achieving the feat in the game against the Mercyhurst Lakers on January 19, 2008. Stock averaged 34.3 saves per 60 minutes of play, which ranked third in the NCAA. In addition, she ranked second overall in the Ivy League with a .924 save percentage.

== Awards and honors ==
- All-Ivy League honors
- All-ECAC honors

=== NWHL ===
- Participant, 2nd NWHL All-Star Game
