= Kelly Babstock =

Canadian-American ice hockey player

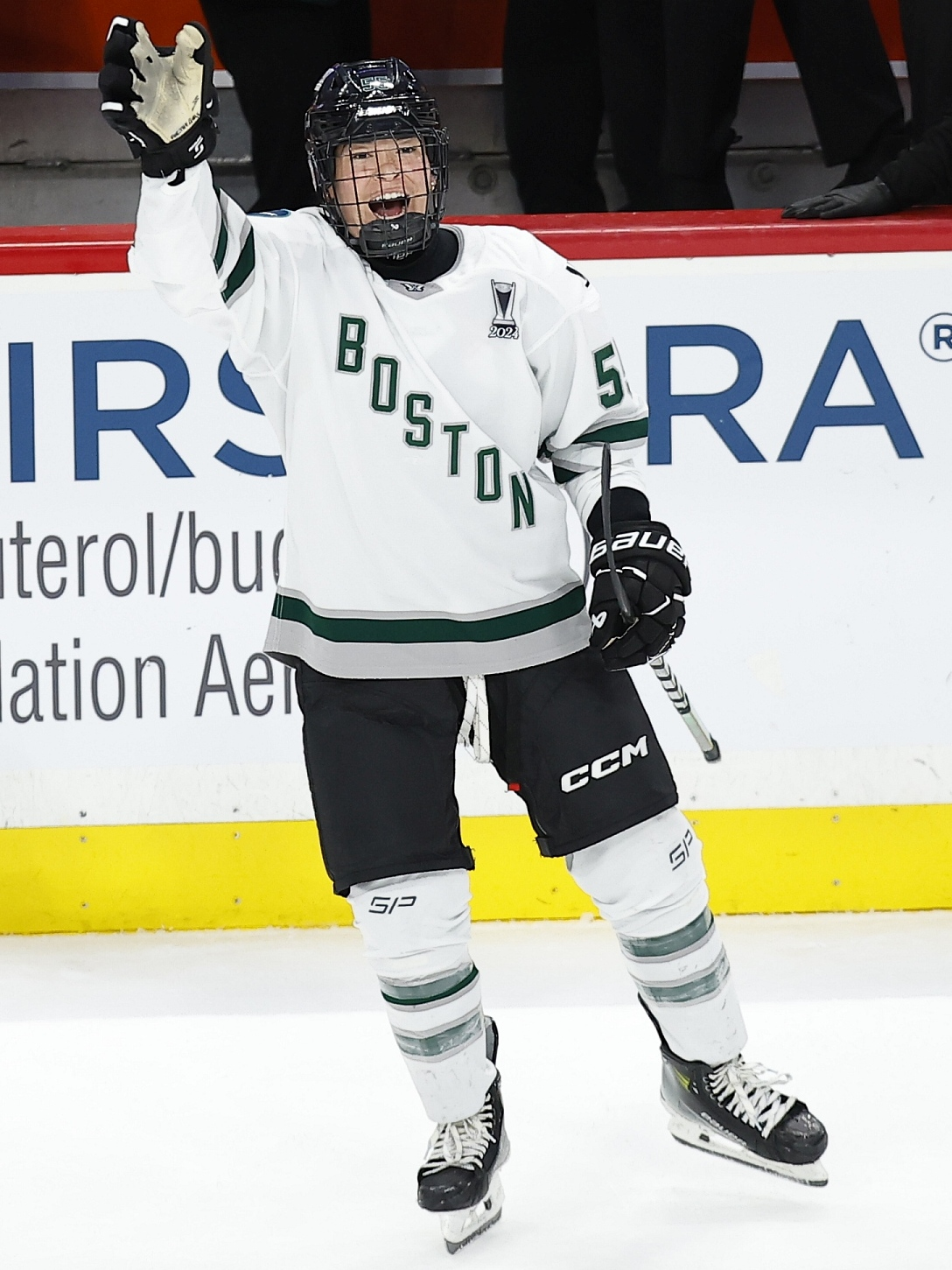
- Babstock with PWHL Boston in 2024
- Born: August 4, 1992 (age 34) Little Current, Ontario, Canada
- Height: 5 ft 7 in (170 cm)
- Position: Forward
- Shoots: Right
- PWHL team Former teams: Boston Fleet: Ladies Team Lugano; Metropolitan Riveters; PWHPA Tri-State; Buffalo Beauts; Connecticut Whale; Quinnipiac Bobcats
- Playing career: 2010–present

Kelly Babstock (born August 4, 1992) is a Canadian-American ice hockey player for the Boston Fleet of the Professional Women's Hockey League (PWHL). She has Ojibway roots and is originally from Little Current on Manitoulin Island. She has ties to Wiikwemkoong Unceded Territory.

Babstock played college ice hockey with the Quinnipiac Bobcats women's ice hockey program and, as of September 2021, remains the top goal, assist, and point scorer in the program's history. She was the first Canadian-born player to score a goal in the Premier Hockey Federation (PHF; called the National Women's Hockey League (NWHL) during 2014 to 2021) and went on to play a total of seven seasons in the league before it was dissolved in 2023.

She competed on the third season of Canada's Ultimate Challenge in 2025.

== Playing career ==
Her junior ice hockey career was played with the Toronto Jr. Aeros of the Provincial Women's Hockey League (Provincial WHL). She helped the team win the gold medal and League Cup during the 2009–10 season, registering 25 goals and 35 assists (60 points) during the regular season, and nine goals and four assists (13 points) during playoffs.

=== NCAA ===
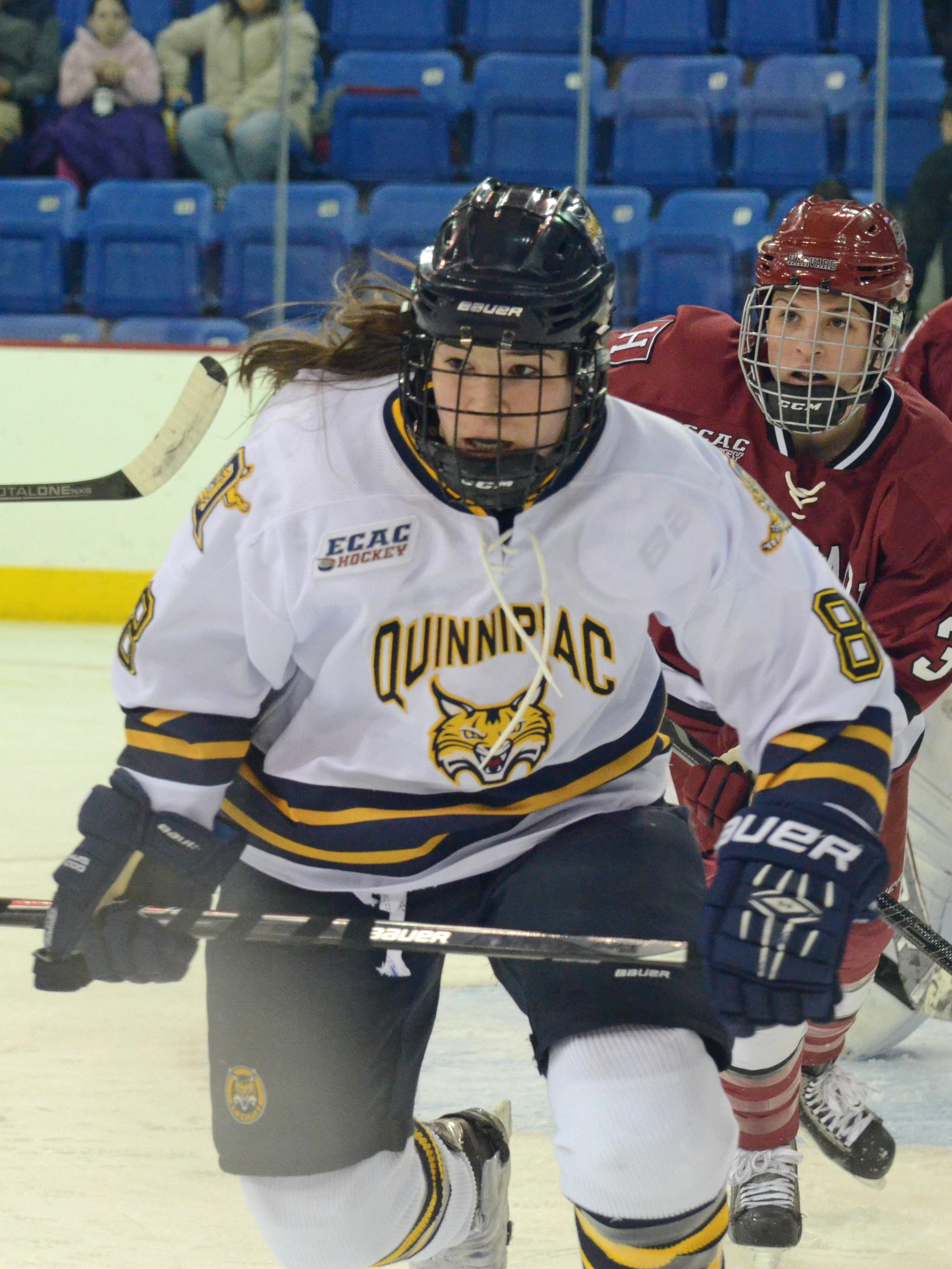
Babstock (left) with Quinnipiac in 2014

Babstock was a member of the Quinnipiac Bobcats women's ice hockey team from 2010 to 2014. She made her mark on college hockey in her freshman season, recording 59 points in 37 games. Across four seasons with Quinnipiac, Babstock registered a total of 95 goals and 108 assists, for a total of 203 points in 148 games.

On November 12 and 13, 2010, Babstock made Quinnipiac program history as she accounted for six of the seven goals scored over the weekend via back-to-back hat-tricks against ECAC Hockey opponents No. 10 ranked Harvard and Dartmouth. As of November 14, Babstock led the Bobcats and the entire NCAA in goals (13) and points (27). In addition, she was the first skater in Quinnipiac history to record two hat-tricks in a single season.

Versus the Brown Bears on Friday, December 3, 2010, Babstock became Quinnipiac's all-time leader in goals scored in a season by netting her 16th goal of the season. Her nation-leading sixth game-winning goal against Yale on Saturday, Dec. 4 was part of a Bobcats 3–1 win.

With a second period goal versus the Colgate Raiders on November 19, 2011, Babstock became the Bobcats program's all-time leading scorer. In just her second season, Babstock surpassed Vicki Graham, who previously held the record with 73 career points, set after the 2006–07 season. Babstock reached the milestone in her 50th career game.

Babstock led all skaters in points at the 2011 Nutmeg Classic, with one goal and three assists for four points. With her two assists in the championship game, Babstock earned the 39th and 40th assists of her career, surpassing Caitlin Peters as the all-time assist leader in Bobcats history. Breann Frykas scored the game-winning goal as the Bobcats bested the Robert Morris Colonials by a 3–2 tally. In honor of her stellar performance, Babstock was named 2011 Nutmeg Classic MVP.

After four record-setting seasons with the women's ice hockey program, Babstock joined the Quinnipiac Bobcats women's lacrosse team as a fifth-year senior. She played in ten games, recording four starts, and finished the season with 21 points (fourteen goals, seven assists). With this record at season's end, she ranked second on the Bobcats in points and was named to the 2014 MAAC All-Rookie Team.

=== Professional ===
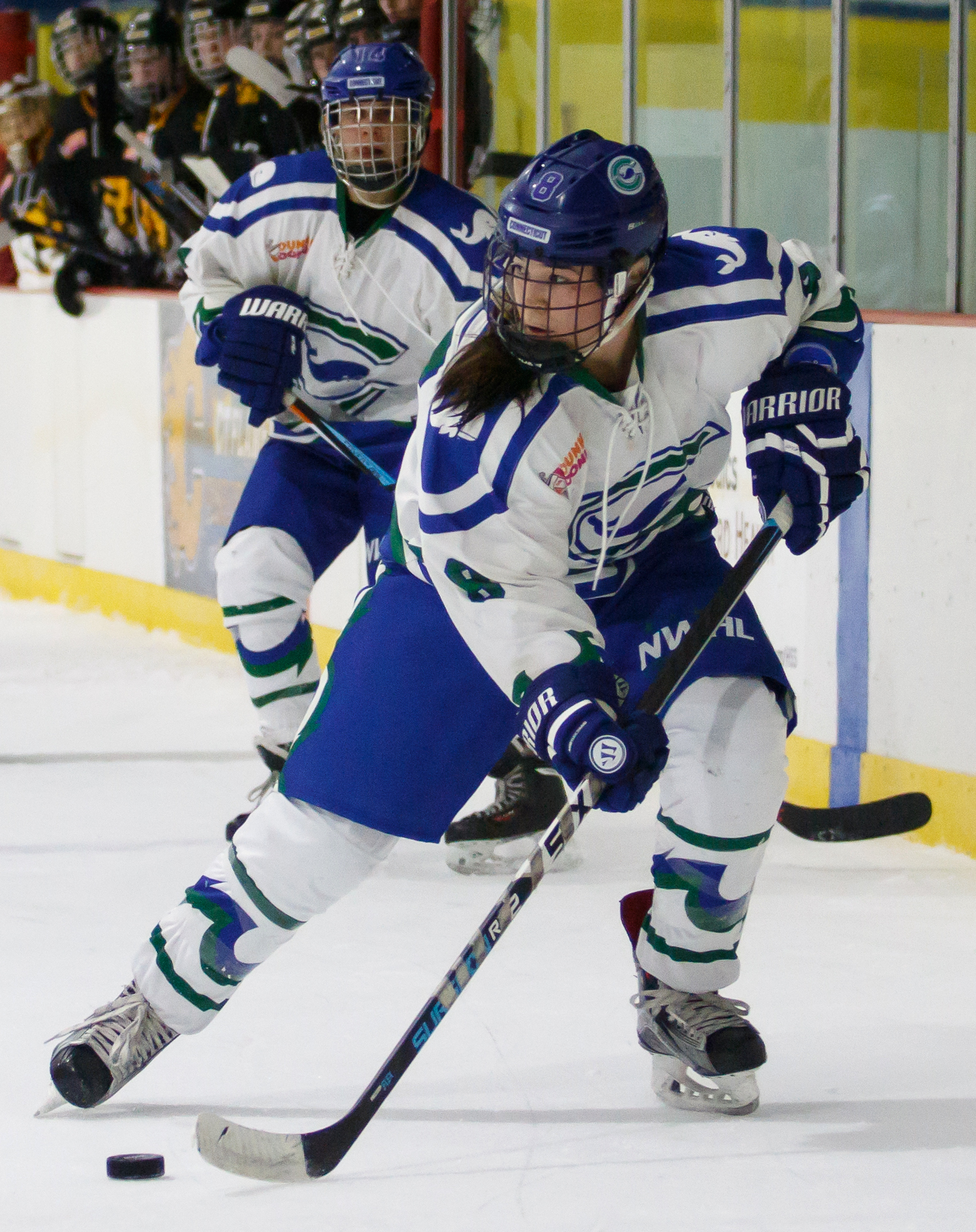
Babstock with the Connecticut Whale in 2017

Connecticut Whale

Competing in the Connecticut Whale's inaugural game on October 11, 2015, Babstock scored a goal in the third period of a 4–1 win against the New York Riveters. Assisted by Kelli Stack, Babstock became the first Canadian-born player to score a goal in NWHL regular season play. Babstock was selected as a "media pick" to play in the 2017 NWHL All-Star Game. Playing for Team Steadman, Babstock scored a goal at the 2nd NWHL All-Star Game, the only Canadian to do so. She also participated in the 2018 NWHL All-Star Game, playing on Team Leveille.

Buffalo Beauts

In June 2018, Babstock signed with the Buffalo Beauts. She notched ten points in sixteen games with the Beauts during the 2018–19 NWHL season.

PWHPA

Babstock was affiliated with the Tri-State chapter of the Professional Women's Hockey Players Association (PWHPA) during the 2019–20 season but was not selected to participate in any of the organization's showcases or events.

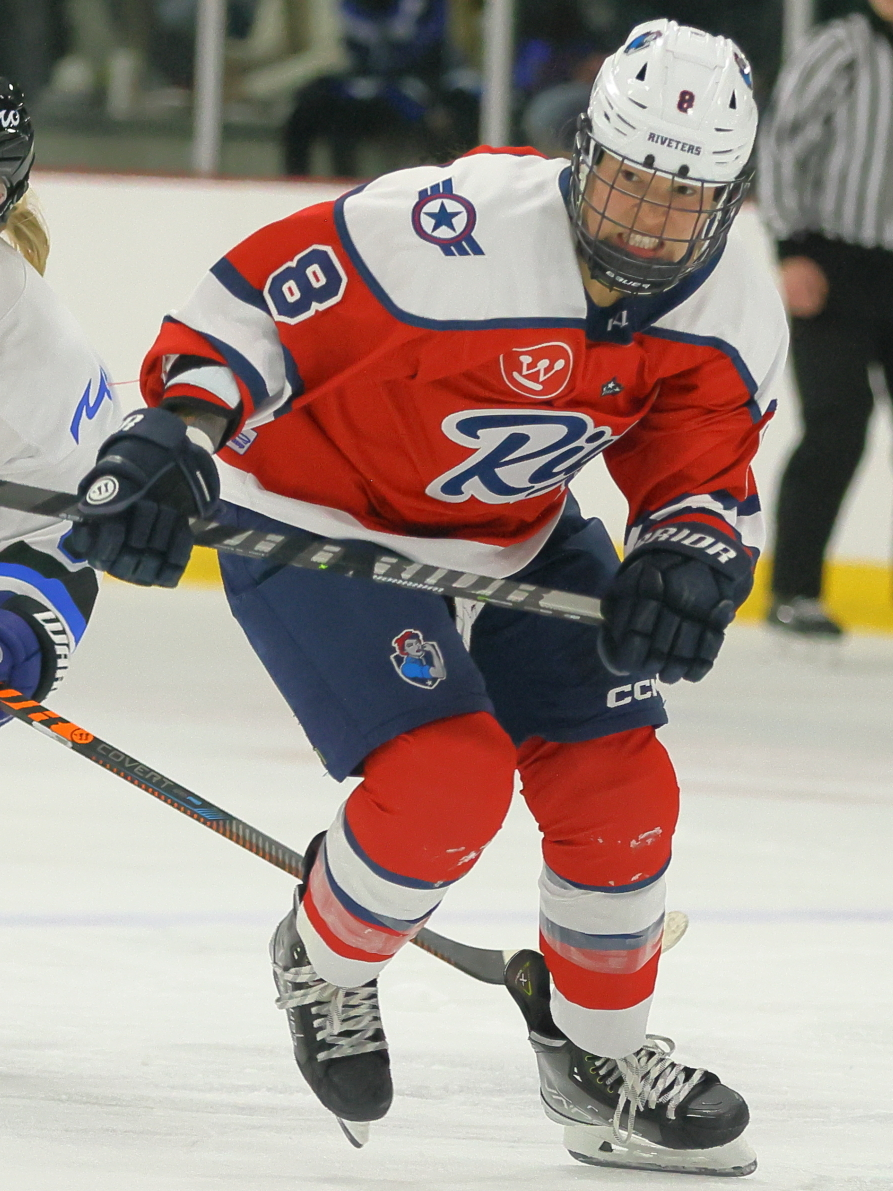
Babstock with the Riveters in 2022

Metropolitan Riveters

On May 2, 2020, Babstock announced her return to the NWHL, signing with the Canadian expansion team, the Toronto Six, for the 2020–21 NWHL season. She joined four former PWHPA players already signed with the Six, including former Connecticut Whale teammates Shiann Darkangelo and Emma Greco. On returning to the NWHL after a year with the PWHPA, she explained, "I realized the [PWH]PA's goals didn't match mine and the NWHL's matches with my goals. So I'm excited to play hockey again." On October 15, 2020, it was announced that the Six had traded her to the Metropolitan Riveters in exchange for the Riveters' first round pick in the 2021 NWHL Draft and second round pick in 2022.

In the opening game of the 2020–21 NWHL season, she became the fourth player in NWHL history to reach 100 career penalty minutes (PIM) and also picked up two assists as the Riveters defeated the Six 2–0. A number of issues plagued the league and the Riveters specifically during the 2020–21 season, which culminated in the team playing only three games.

Babstock led the team in penalty minutes during the 2021–22 PHF season, collecting 30 minutes in twenty games and finishing second in the league for PIM behind the Boston Pride's Kaleigh Fratkin (34 PIM). She ranked fifth on the Riveters for scoring, with thirteen points from five goals and eight assists.

In the 2022–23 PHF season, she tied captain Madison Packer as the Riveters' points leader after scoring 21 points in 24 regular season games – her best points total since her rookie season with the Whale in 2015–16. She was selected to play for Team Canada in the 2023 PHF All-Star Game, her third All-Star Game appearance.

Boston Fleet

Babstock joined the Boston Fleet (formerly known as PWHL Boston) in their inaugural season, appearing in 4 games and recording 1 assist. In the 2024 and 2024-2025 seasons, Babstock mainly served as a reserve player.

== Personal life ==
Babstock's mother, Donna, is Ojibwe from the Wiikwemkoong Unceded Territory and her father, David, is from Newfoundland. She is the third eldest of six siblings with one older and two younger sisters and two brothers. Her eldest brother, Jeff Shattler, played professional box lacrosse in the National Lacrosse League and serves as Director of Player Development for the Fighting Sioux lacrosse program of Standing Buffalo Dakota Nation.

She attended Port Credit Secondary School in Mississauga, Ontario, where she was the ice hockey leading scorer for three years and the men's field lacrosse leading scorer for one year.

A Canadian citizen by birth, Babstock gained American dual-citizenship in 2019. She began pursuing American citizenship in her junior year of university, motivated by a desire to establish her post-college life in the United States. Her Canadian-born Native American status made it relatively easy to gain a green card and she became an American citizen in a naturalization ceremony held at KeyBank Center on January 29, 2019. Of gaining American citizenship, she said, "It's a big deal, you know? You're Native American, and you have these rights [codified under US immigration law as a result of the Jay Treaty], and I just took advantage of them."

In late-January 2021, Barstool Sports began a social media campaign targeting women with histories of reporting on or working for the NWHL. The campaign was mounted in response to a limited expression of disappointment on Twitter after Babstock and teammate Rebecca Russo appeared on Token CEO, a podcast hosted by Barstool CEO Erika Nardini. Babstock became embroiled when she voiced support for Nardini and liked Tweets by Barstool-founder Dave Portnoy that arbitrarily called for her Riveters teammate, Saroya Tinker, to be jailed after Tinker stated she was not in favour of the NWHL associating with Barstool and called the outlet an "openly racist platform."

== Career statistics ==
=== Regular season and playoffs ===
			Regular season					Playoffs
Season	Team	League	GP	G	A	Pts	PIM	GP	G	A	Pts	PIM
2007–08	Mississauga Jr. Chiefs	Provincial WHL	1	2	1	3	0	—	—	—	—	—
2007–08	Toronto Jr. Aeros	Provincial WHL	29	14	18	32	49	7	2	7	9	6
2008–09	Toronto Jr. Aeros	Provincial WHL	33	25	34	59	88	8	4	6	10	14
2009–10	Toronto Jr. Aeros	Provincial WHL	33	25	35	60	42	7	9	4	13	6
2010–11	Quinnipiac Bobcats	NCAA	37	30	28	58	34	—	—	—	—	—
2011–12	Quinnipiac Bobcats	NCAA	37	18	22	40	32	—	—	—	—	—
2012–13	Quinnipiac Bobcats	NCAA	36	28	27	55	40	—	—	—	—	—
2013–14	Quinnipiac Bobcats	NCAA	38	19	30	49	30	—	—	—	—	—
2015–16	Connecticut Whale	NWHL	18	9	13	22	24	3	4	0	4	2
2016–17	Connecticut Whale	NWHL	17	10	9	19	26	1	0	0	0	2
2017–18	Connecticut Whale	NWHL	14	4	5	9	22	1	0	0	0	0
2018–19	Buffalo Beauts	NWHL	16	4	6	10	22	2	0	0	0	6
2019–20	Tri-State	PWHPA	—	—	—	—	—	—	—	—	—	—
2020–21	Metropolitan Riveters	NWHL	3	0	2	2	6	—	—	—	—	—
2021–22	Metropolitan Riveters	PHF	20	5	8	13	30	1	1	0	1	4
2022–23	Metropolitan Riveters	PHF	24	10	11	21	30	—	—	—	—	—
2023–24	Ladies Team Lugano	SWHL A	8	6	7	13	18	—	—	—	—	—
2023–24	PWHL Boston	PWHL	4	0	1	1	2	8	0	0	0	4
2024–25	Boston Fleet	PWHL	9	0	0	0	9	—	—	—	—	—
2025–26	Färjestad BK	SDHL	12	7	2	9	8	5	0	4	4	4
NCAA totals			148	95	107	202	136	—	—	—	—	—
PHF totals			112	42	54	96	160	8	5	0	5	14

== Awards and honours ==
Award	Year or period
College ice hockey
ECAC Hockey Rookie of the Week (5)	Week of October 5, 2010
ECAC Hockey Rookie of the Week (5)	Week of November 16, 2010
ECAC Hockey Rookie of the Week (5)	Week of November 30, 2010
ECAC Hockey Rookie of the Week (5)	Week of December 7, 2010
ECAC Hockey Rookie of the Week (5)	Week of February 15, 2011
Quinnipiac University Athlete of the Month (4)	November 2010
Quinnipiac University Athlete of the Month (4)	December 2010
Quinnipiac University Athlete of the Month (4)	January 2011
Quinnipiac University Athlete of the Month (4)	November 2013
ECAC Hockey Player of the Week (10)	Week of December 7, 2010
ECAC Hockey Player of the Week (10)	Week of February 15, 2011
ECAC Hockey Player of the Week (10)	Week of November 22, 2011
ECAC Hockey Player of the Week (10)	Week of February 21, 2012
ECAC Hockey Player of the Week (10)	Week of October 9, 2012
ECAC Hockey Player of the Week (10)	Week of October 16, 2012
ECAC Hockey Player of the Week (10)	Week of December 4, 2012
ECAC Hockey Player of the Week (10)	Week of February 12, 2013
ECAC Hockey Player of the Week (10)	Week of October 22, 2013
ECAC Hockey Player of the Week (10)	Week of December 3, 2013
Sports Illustrated's Faces in the Crowd	January 17, 2011
ECAC Hockey Rookie of the Year	2010–11
Quinnipiac Women's Hockey Rookie of the Year	2010–11
All-ECAC Hockey Rookie Team	2010–11
ECAC Hockey Player of the Year	2010–11
Quinnipiac University Female Athlete of the Year (2)	2010–11
Quinnipiac University Female Athlete of the Year (2)	2013–14
Quinnipiac Women's Hockey Most Valuable Player (4) 2010-2011, 2011-2012, 2012-2013, 2013-2014	2011–12
All-ECAC Hockey First Team (3)	2010–11
All-ECAC Hockey First Team (3)	2012–13
All-ECAC Hockey First Team (3)	2013–14
New England Women's Division I All-Star (4)	2010–11
New England Women's Division I All-Star (4)	2011–12
New England Women's Division I All-Star (4)	2012–13
New England Women's Division I All-Star (4)	2013–14
Patty Kazmaier Award Nominee	2010–11
ECAC Hockey Player of the Month (2)	November 2011
ECAC Hockey Player of the Month (2)	October 2012
All-ECAC Hockey Second Team	2011–12
Patty Kazmaier Award Top-10 Finalist	2013–14
CCM/AHCA All-American; Women's University Division - Second Team	2013–14
ECAC Hockey All-Decade Second Team	2020
PHF (NWHL)
All-Star Game	2017 (Team Steadman)
All-Star Game	2018 (Team Leveille)
All-Star Game	2023 (Team Canada)
Player of the Week	November 20, 2017
Foundation Award	2018–19
Other
Aboriginal Role Model of the Year	2011
MAAC Women's Lacrosse All-Rookie Team	2014
Little Native Hockey League Hall of Fame – Alumna	2016
North American Indigenous Athletics Hall of Fame inductee	2023
