= Dani Rylan =

American entrepreneur and ice hockey player

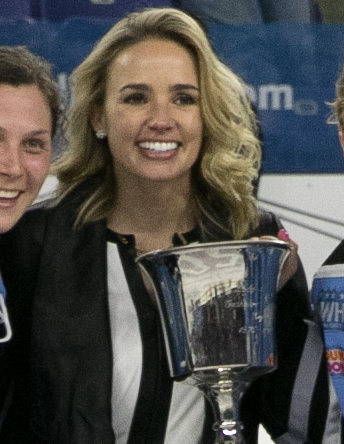
- Rylan in 2017

Personal information
- Born: August 5, 1987 (age 38) Tampa, Florida, U.S.
- Height: 5 ft 3 in (1.60 m)

Sport
- Sport: Ice Hockey
- Position: Left Wing
- College team: Northeastern

Dani Rylan Kearney (born August 5, 1987) is an American entrepreneur and former ice hockey player. She is the founder and former commissioner of the National Women's Hockey League (NWHL), the first professional women's hockey league in the United States, and the first professional women's hockey league ever to pay its players in North America. Prior to launching the league in March 2015, Rylan attempted to bring a CWHL expansion team to New York in 2014. She previously played with the Northeastern Huskies women's ice hockey program in NCAA play and was a captain in her final season.

== Early life and playing career ==
Rylan began playing ice hockey with boys on the Tampa Bay Junior Lightning as an elementary school student. She attended boarding school at the St. Mark's School in New England and was captain of the girls' hockey team.

Prior to joining Northeastern University, Rylan played one season with the Division II club program at the Metropolitan State College of Denver, a men's team that competes in the American Collegiate Hockey Association. She earned a broadcasting journalism degree at Metro State in 2010.

=== Career stats ===
Season	Team	GP	G	A	P	PIM	PPG	SHG	GWG
2010–11	Northeastern	37	3	7	10	20	0	0	1
2011–12	Northeastern	33	3	7	10	16	0	0	2

== Executive career ==
Rylan was inspired to create a women's league while watching the United States and Canadian national teams play in the finals of the 2014 Winter Olympics and began researching the new business opportunity. She began calling people she knew in ice hockey circles and the plans for the league began within a year. She contacted players, conducted research on markets, held training camps, created four teams, and scheduled the venues.

On October 12, 2020, Rylan stepped down as commissioner and was replaced by Tyler Tumminia as interim commissioner during a league reorganization. The league changed its governing model to an incorporated association overseen by a board of governors with one representative per team. Rylan remained with the league to oversee the Beauts, Whale, Riveters, and Whitecaps while it searched for independent ownership of the league-operated teams before resigning from that role in March 2021.

== Personal life ==
Rylan grew up in Indian Rocks Beach, Florida. Her father worked in marketing for the Tampa Bay Lightning. After college, she moved to New York City and opened a coffee shop named Rise and Grind in East Harlem.
