= Jaimie Leonoff =

Canadian ice hockey player

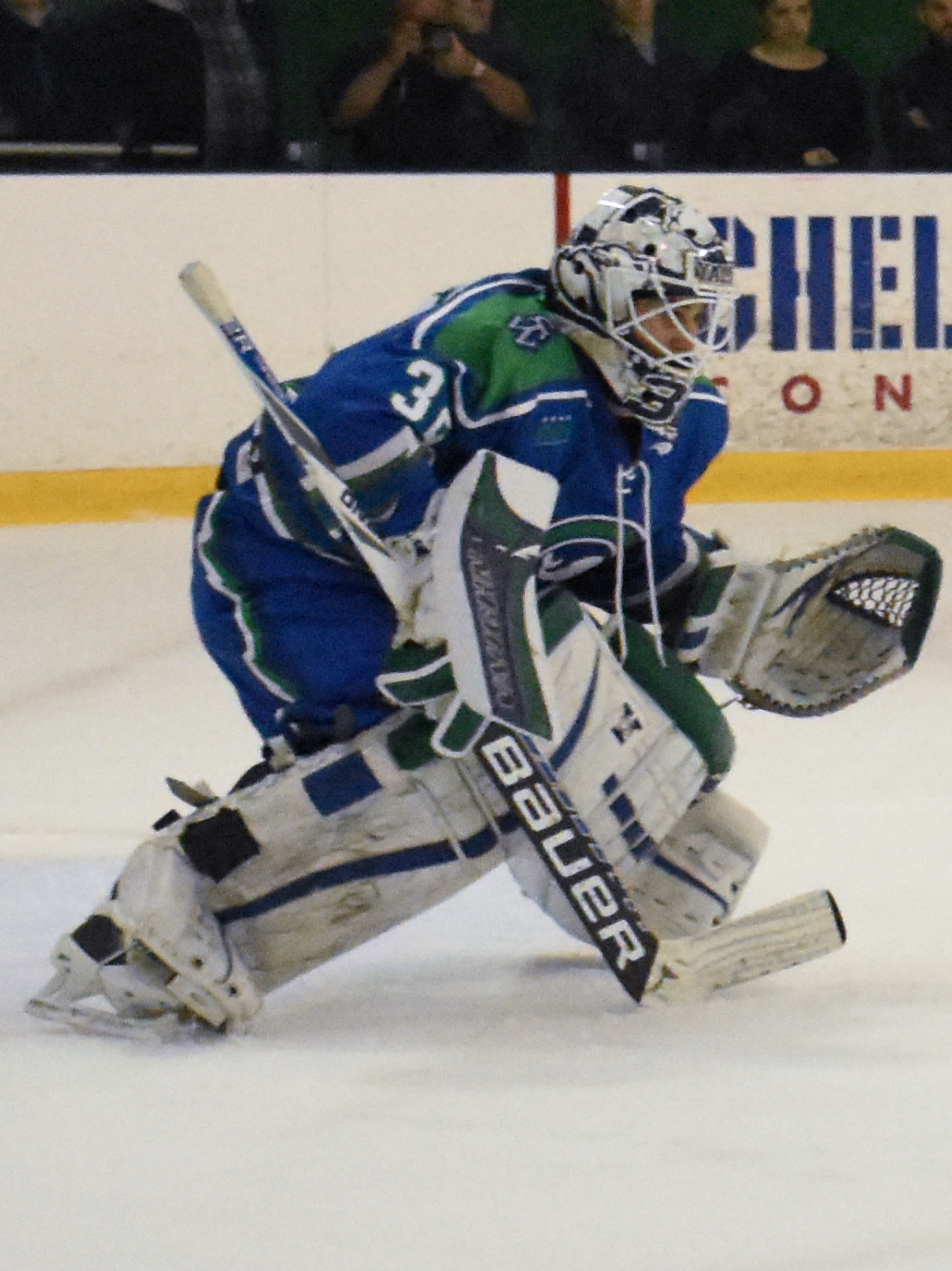
- Leonoff with the Connecticut Whale in 2015
- Born: January 28, 1993 (age 32); Montreal, Quebec, Canada
- Height: 5 ft 7 in (170 cm)
- Weight: 141 lb (64 kg; 10 st 1 lb)
- Position: Goaltender
- Caught: Left
- Played for: Connecticut Whale; Yale Bulldogs
- Playing career: 2011–2016

Jaimie Leonoff (born January 28, 1990) is a Canadian ice hockey executive and former goaltender, who last played for the Connecticut Whale of the Premier Hockey Federation (PHF). She currently serves as NY Hockey Holdings business analyst for the New York Islanders of the National Hockey League (NHL).

== Playing career ==
From 2011 to 2015, she attended Yale University in the United States, serving as the Yale Bulldogs starting goaltender every year except her first year, and being named Team MVP three years in a row. In November of her rookie season, she posted a 52-save game against Mercyhurst, followed up by a 63-save game the next day, and was named an ECAC Hockey All-Academic at the end of year. She was named to the Second Team All-Ivy League in her sophomore year and an Honorable mention All-Ivy League in her senior year.

When Dani Rylan founded the National Women's Hockey League in 2015, she signed her first professional contract with the Connecticut Whale. She served as the Whale's starting goalie during the 2015–16 season, posting a .936 save percentage, the best in the league, despite facing an average of over 43 shots against every 60 minutes, by far the heaviest workload in the league. She was in net for the opening game in NWHL history, making 35 saves to lead the Whale to a 4-1 victory over the New York Riveters. She was named to Team Knight for the 1st NWHL All-Star Game. For the Skills Competition, she dressed up as a cop, attempting to make all her saves as if she was wielding a baseball bat.

She left Connecticut to sign with the Metropolitan Riveters for the 2016–17 NWHL season, on a $10,000 contract. However, after going through hip surgery during the off-season and then suffering a torn labrum, she was forced the miss the entire season, and chose to retire from professional play.

== International career ==
Leonoff was invited to the Hockey Canada National Women’s Team Fall Festival in 2014.

== Personal life ==
Her father, Joel Leonoff, formerly served as CEO of the Paysafe Group, and has been an investor in the Premier Hockey Federation. She has previously express a desire to become an American citizen.
