= Kaleigh Fratkin =

Canadian ice hockey player

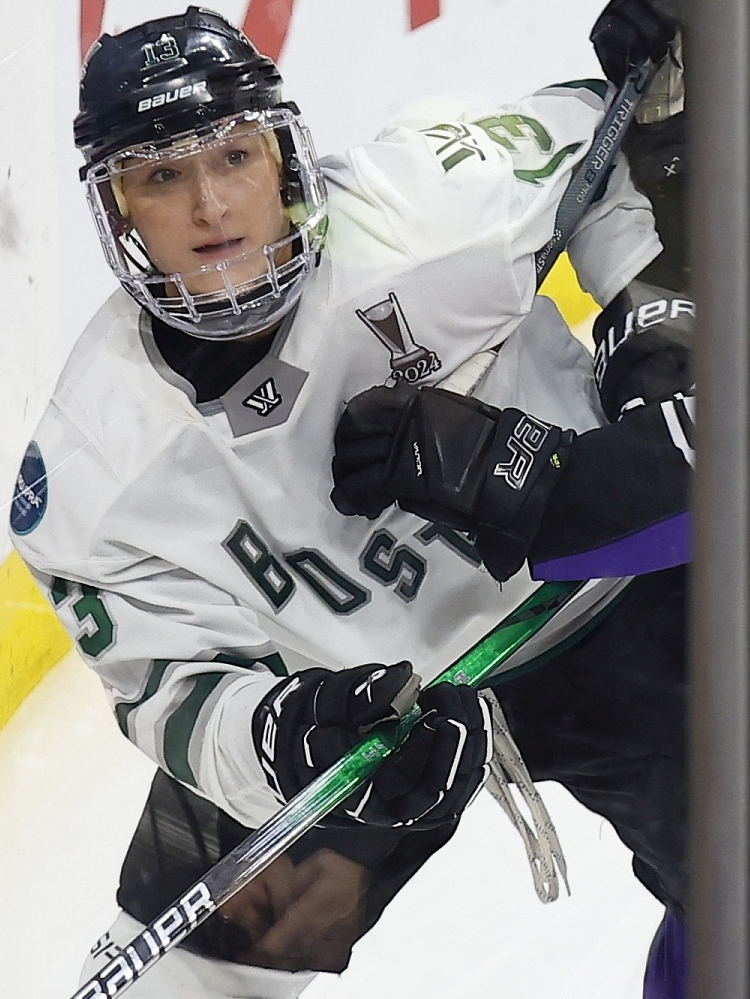
- Fratkin with PWHL Boston in 2024
- Born: March 24, 1992 (age 34) Burnaby, British Columbia, Canada
- Height: 5 ft 8 in (173 cm)
- Weight: 154 lb (70 kg; 11 st 0 lb)
- Position: Defence
- Shoots: Right
- team Former teams: Free agent Boston Fleet; Metropolitan Riveters; Boston Pride; Connecticut Whale; Boston Blades
- National team: Canada
- Playing career: 2014–present
Medal record
Women's ice hockey
Representing Canada
Nations Cup
Gold medal – first place	2015 Germany	Tournament
Women's ice hockey
Representing Canada
U18 IIHF World Championship
Silver medal – second place	2009 Germany	Tournament

Kaleigh Fratkin (born March 24, 1992) is a Canadian professional ice hockey player who played most recently for Boston of the Professional Women's Hockey League (PWHL). The second-longest tenured player and leading scorer among defenders in Premier Hockey Federation (PHF) history, she was the first Canadian player to sign a contract in the league, is a five-time PHF all-star, and is a two-time PHF Defender of the Year in 2020 and 2021. She was also a member of the Boston Pride roster that captured the 2021 and 2022 Isobel Cup, and was one of three 2023 PHF All-Star captains. Previous to the joining the NWHL, she won the Clarkson Cup in 2015 and was the first girl to play boys' midget AAA hockey in British Columbia.

== Playing career ==
=== Early career ===
During high school, she played for the Vancouver NW Giants of the boys' BC Hockey U18 AAA league, the first girl in history to play on a British Columbian midget major boys' league, playing alongside future NHLers Sam Reinhart and Alexander Kerfoot. She finished third in scoring among her team's defenders during the 2009–10 season, despite missing fifteen games with an injury. That year, the Giants won a provincial championship, and Fratkin was named a finalist for the BC Athlete of the Year award. She would also make a handful of appearances for the Aldergrove Kodiaks in the boys' Pacific Junior Hockey League.

From 2010 to 2014, she played for the Boston University Terriers women's ice hockey, accumulating a total of 66 points across 151 NCAA games. She scored 10 points in 38 games in her rookie collegiate season, notching her first goal on 11 February 2011 against Northeastern University. She broke out in the 2012–13 season, almost doubling her point production up to 17 points in 37 games, and picking up points in seven of the last eight games of the year. She was named an assistant captain for the team ahead of senior year, where she would go on to score a career-best 30 points in 38 games, being named a 2013–14 New England Division I All-Star and Hockey East First-Team All-Star.

=== CWHL ===
Fratkin was selected 20th overall, in the 5th round, by the Boston Blades in the 2014 CWHL Draft. After graduating from Boston University, she signed her first professional contract with the Blades. She put up eight points in 22 games in her rookie Canadian Women's Hockey League season, competing in all postseason games as the Blades captured the 2015 Clarkson Cup.

=== Premier Hockey Federation ===
After the end of the 2014-15 CWHL season, despite having just won the Clarkson Cup, Fratkin was cut from the Canadian national team development squad. The blow of the announcement, combined with the financial insecurity that came with playing as a non-national team player in the CWHL, originally pushed her into considering retirement.

However, when the Premier Hockey Federation was founded that summer by Dani Rylan as the first women's hockey league to offer all players a salary, she decided to take a chance and sign with the Connecticut Whale. She was the first Canadian player to sign a contract in the new league and would be the highest paid Canadian in the league that year, with a $20,000 salary. She was named the assistant captain for the team ahead of the league's inaugural season. On December 31, she was one of three Connecticut Whale players (including Kate Buesser and Shannon Doyle) who were loaned to the Boston Pride for one day to participate in the 2016 Outdoor Women's Classic against the CWHL's Les Canadiennes de Montréal, the first outdoor professional women's hockey game. She finished the year with 17 points in 18 games, leading all NWHL defenders in points and being named to the 1st NWHL All-Star Game, which took place on January 24, 2016, at the Harbor Center in Buffalo, New York.

In April 2016, she left Connecticut to sign with the New York Riveters. She was named to the NWHL All-Star Game for the second year in a row, however, her production dropped significantly during the season, receiving much more limited power-play time and occasionally even being used as a third-line forward by Riveters head coach Chad Wiseman.

Ahead of the 2017–18 NWHL season, Fratkin joined the Boston Pride, the third team in her NWHL career.

After the collapse of the Canadian Women's Hockey League in May 2019, Fratkin became the first player to re-sign with an NWHL team for the 2019–20 NWHL season, and became one of the first players to publicly criticise the newly forming Professional Women's Hockey Players Association, stating that:

"At the beginning, when I was approached about if I was going to join the movement or not and [asked] about my stance I had a ton of questions. I asked for follow-up, I asked when I would be getting those answers, and I never got them. I know that the [PHWPA] has had multiple phone calls and none of them have been directly sent to me...

I want to know if we're ultimately doing this for the salary, better resources, and to make it more sustainable, what does that look like? You know, do we have a [plan] that's already solidified? If there was something legitimate there, if there was some sort of contractual agreement that said, ‘Hey, this is the money that you're going to be making, these are where the teams will be, this is what it's going to look like,’ then I would be looking at it a little bit differently."

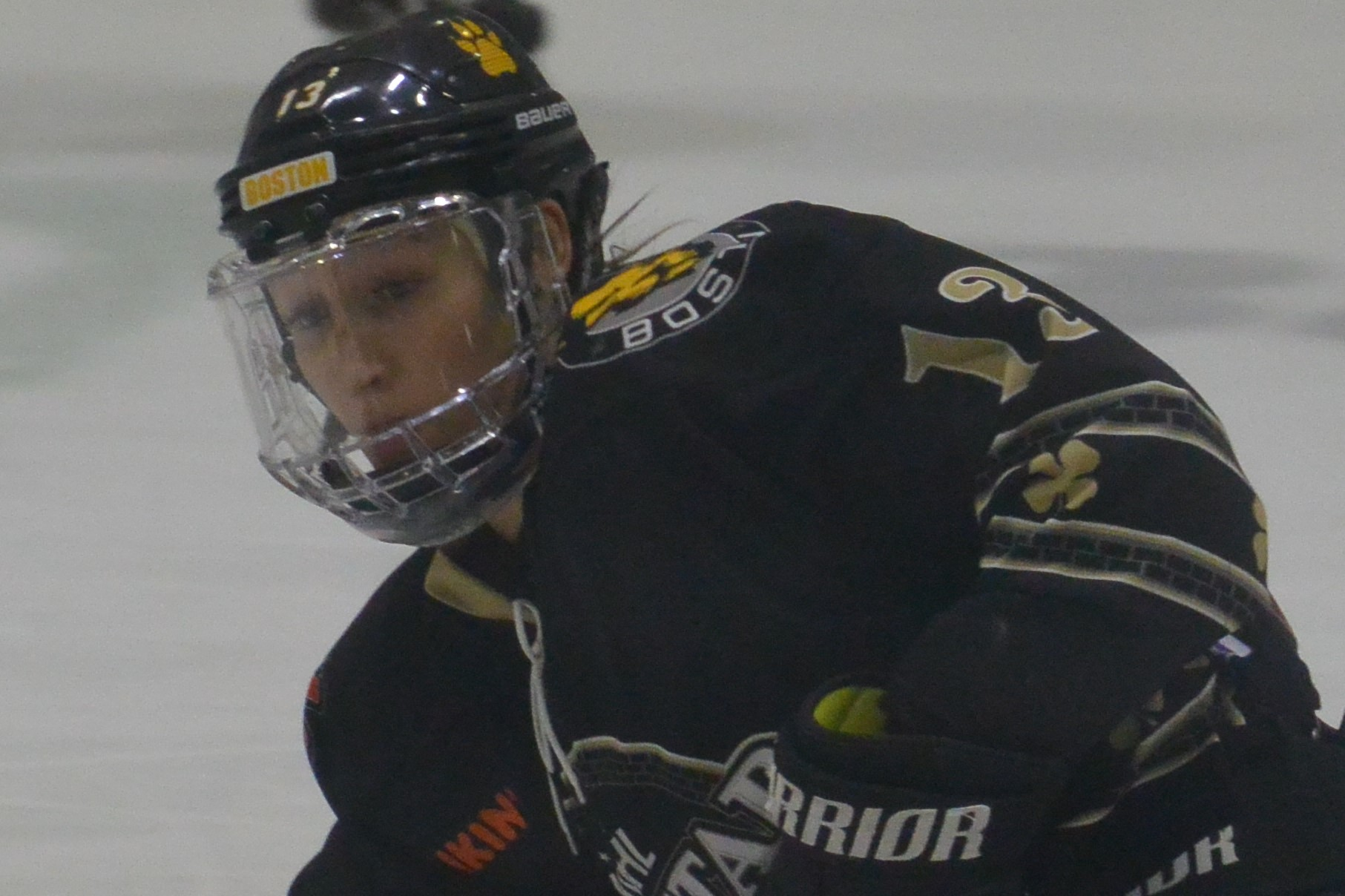
Fratkin at the 2020 NWHL All-Star Game

During the 2019–20 season, her third season with the Boston Pride and her first serving as an assistant captain for the team, Fratkin notched a career-high 23 points in 24 games, helping the Pride finish the season almost undefeated and making the Isobel Cup finals before the season was cancelled due to the COVID-19 pandemic in the United States. That year, she was named NWHL Defender of the Year. She was also named to Team Packer for the 2020 NWHL All-Star Game, her third consecutive all-star game appearance. At the All-Star Game, she won the hardest shot competition with a winning shot of 76 miles per hour.

She re-signed with the Pride for the 2020–21 NWHL season, returning as an assistant captain for the team. She would win her second-straight Defender of the Year award as the Pride went on to win the Isobel Cup. She would stay with the team for both the 2021-22 and 2022-23 seasons in the newly-renamed Premier Hockey Federation (PHF), being named an all-star in both and collecting her second Isobel Cup in 2022.

=== Professional Women's Hockey League ===
After going undrafted in the 2023 PWHL Draft, Fratkin signed a one-year contract with PWHL Boston prior to their 2023 training camp.

== International career ==
Fratkin represented Canada at the 2009 IIHF World Women's U18 Championship, scoring four points in five games as the country won silver. She attended the Team Canada U18 development camp each year from 2006 to 2009, twice participating in the U18 Summer Series against the United States. With Canada's U22 Development Team, she earned a gold medal at the 2015 Nations Cup in Germany.

She was named to the Canadian senior national team roster for the 2014 Fall Festival and to the 2015 pre-World Championship training camp roster, but was ultimately cut from the team before the 2015 IIHF Women's World Championship.

== Style of play ==
One of eight original NWHLers still active in the league and a fixture on the top defensive pairing for the Boston Pride, Fratkin has been most often been described as an offensive defender with elite playmaking skills. She has stated that "What I've noticed from college to turning pro is that defensemen being very offensive is extremely helpful to the NWHL style of play." She also been noted for the strength of her shot, her physicality, currently holding the NWHL's record for career penalty minutes, as well as her ironman streak, having only missed five games since the start of her professional career.

She has worn the number 13 on her jersey since her days in youth hockey, picking the number after being advised by her father to choose one that nobody else wanted.

== Personal life ==
Fratkin was born and raised in Burnaby, British Columbia, Canada, and is Jewish. Her parents are Ron and Marilyn Fratkin, and she has two brothers, Jesse (who played on the Brown University men's ice hockey team and on the Stockton Thunder of the ECHL) and Casey (who played on the Elmira College and Wesleyan University men's ice hockey teams). She attended Burnaby Central High School, where she also played lacrosse and soccer, winning provincial championships in both sports.

She obtained her bachelor's degree from the Boston University College of Communication, and her master's degree in sports leadership from Northeastern University. During the 2015–16 season, she served as an analytics intern with the New York Islanders.

Fratkin got engaged to her longtime boyfriend Henry Lee, former Boston University Terriers men's lacrosse player, on January 15, 2021. The couple got married June 4, 2022, in Vancouver, Canada.

== Career statistics ==
			Regular Season					Playoffs
Season	Team	League	GP	G	A	Pts	PIM	GP	G	A	Pts	PIM
2009–10	Aldergrove Kodiaks	PIJHL	5	0	0	0	2	—	—	—	—	—
2010–11	Boston University	HE	38	1	9	10	47	—	—	—	—	—
2011–12	Boston University	HE	38	3	6	9	64	—	—	—	—	—
2012–13	Boston University	HE	37	1	16	17	52	—	—	—	—	—
2013–14	Boston University	HE	38	4	26	30	68	—	—	—	—	—
2014–15	Boston Blades	CWHL	22	1	7	8	10	3	0	1	1	4
2015–16	Connecticut Whale	NWHL	18	5	12	17	40	3	0	1	1	6
2016–17	New York Riveters	NWHL	18	1	5	6	20	1	0	0	0	0
2017–18	Boston Pride	NWHL	11	0	5	5	20	1	0	0	0	2
2018–19	Boston Pride	NWHL	16	2	7	9	26	1	0	0	0	2
2019–20	Boston Pride	NWHL	24	3	20	23	38	1	1	2	3	0
2020–21	Boston Pride	NWHL	7	0	9	9	8	2	0	2	2	0
2021–22	Boston Pride	PHF	20	1	4	5	34	3	0	3	3	2
2022–23	Boston Pride	PHF	24	3	9	12	16	2	0	2	2	2
2023–24	PWHL Boston	PWHL	24	2	1	3	26	8	0	0	0	8
NWHL/PHF totals			138	15	71	86	202	14	1	10	11	14
PWHL totals			24	2	2	3	26	8	0	0	0	8

== Awards, honours and championships ==
Championships
2021 Isobel Cup Champion
2022 Isobel Cup Champion

- 2016, 2017, 2020, 2022 PHF All-Star Teams
- 2020 NWHL Defensive Player of the Year Award
- 2021 NWHL Defensive Player of the Year Award
- 2020-21 NWHL leader, Assists

== See also ==
- List of select Jewish ice hockey players
