= Katie Fitzgerald =

American ice hockey goaltender (born 1994)

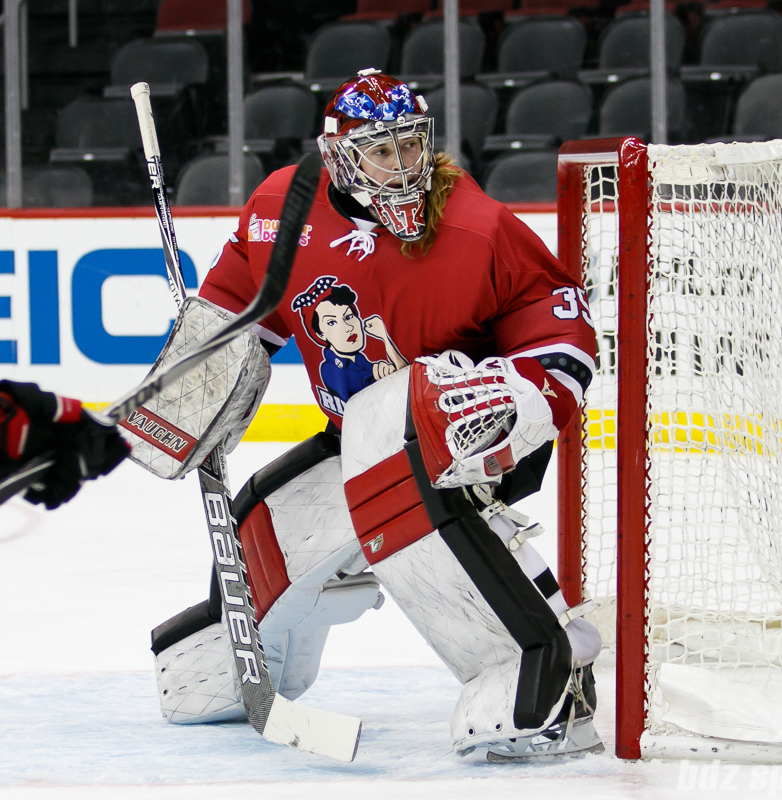
- Katie Fitzgerald playing for the Metropolitan Riveters in 2017
- Born: April 13, 1994 (age 32) Des Plaines, Illinois, USA
- Height: 5 ft 10 in (178 cm)
- Position: Goaltender
- Catches: Left
- PWHPA team Former teams: Independent; Metropolitan Riveters; St. Cloud State
- Playing career: 2012–present

Kathleen "Katie" Fitzgerald (born April 13, 1994) is an American ice hockey player who currently plays for the Professional Women's Hockey Players Association (PWHPA). She previously played for the Metropolitan Riveters in the Premier Hockey Federation (PHF). Having played NCAA hockey with the St. Cloud State Huskies, she was the first Husky to sign a contract in the PHF.

In 2018, she helped the Riveters win the Isobel Cup and was named Isobel Cup Most Valuable Player. She was selected to play in the 2017 and 2018 All-Star Games.

== Early life ==
Fitzgerald was raised in the Chicago suburb of Des Plaines, Illinois, where she attended Maine West High School and lettered in volleyball and softball. She played for the Chicago Mission AAA hockey club from 2007 to 2012 winning five state championships in Illinois. and won a Silver Medal at the US U16 Nationals in 2011 and a Bronze Medal at the USA U12 Nationals. Fitzgerald was named to and participated in the AHAI/USA Hockey Development-Central Region camp in 2011.

An honor roll student, Fitzgerald helped the softball team win a conference title and was named to the All-Conference team. She earned All-Area and All-Conference awards for volleyball and was named the team's Most Valuable Player (MVP) four times.

== Playing career ==
=== NCAA ===
During her freshman season in 2012-13, Fitzgerald played in 15 games as goalie and posted a .912 save percentage (424 saves). She made her debut on October 6. On December 8, she notched an assist against the Minnesota State Mavericks. Fitzgerald was named the team's Rookie of the Year.

During the 2013-14 season, Fitzgerald was the starting goalie in 11 of the 13 games that she played. She tallied 381 saves for a .907 save percentage in 712:06 minutes of play. She made over 30 saves in 7 games and made a season-high 44 saves against Minnesota. She was named Women’s Defensive Player of the Week by the WCHA Conference for games played December 12–13, 2014.

Fitzgerald started in 14 of the 16 games that she played during her junior season and notched a .907 save percentage (428 saves) in 873:30 minutes of play. She recorded her first career shutout on November 8 against Rensselaer Polytechnic Institute and another on December 13 in a 3-0 win against the Bemidji Beavers. She made a season-high 47 saves against the Minnesota Gophers on January 24, 2015.

After splitting some of her time as starting goaltender her first three seasons, Fitzgerald was the starting goaltender in 34 of 35 games her senior year. She tallied a .906 save percentage (976 saves) and led all goaltenders in the WCHA in shots faced while playing in 34 games. Her final win on home ice at St. Cloud took place on February 12, as she made 39 saves in a win against North Dakota.

=== Premier Hockey Federation ===
Fitzgerald signed with the Metropolitan Riveters of the Premier Hockey Federation (PHF, then called the National Women's Hockey League) in August 2016 for the 2016–17 NWHL season. She made her regular season debut on October 8, 2016, against defending Isobel Cup champion, Boston Pride. On October 16, she made her first PHF start, logging 34 saves in a 4-2 loss to the Connecticut Whale. On November 20, 2016, Fitzgerald recorded a shutout in a 4-0 victory against the Connecticut Whale, logging the first shutout in her team's history. She was subsequently named NWHL Player of the Week. Following the 2016 season, Fitzgerald was named Goaltender of the Year by the media after notching a 7–6–1 record with a 3.01 goals-against-average and a .901 save percentage.

Fitzgerald participated in the 3rd NWHL All-Star Game. Later in the 2017–18 NWHL season, she backstopped the Metropolitan Riveters to win the Isobel Cup in a 1-0 victory. This was the first cup for the franchise and a milestone night for Fitzgerald as she logged a shutout.

== Coaching career ==
Fitzgerald has coached youth players for the Midwest Goalie School, Chicago Blackhawks Youth, and Ironbound Hockey.

== Awards and honors ==
- NWHL Player of the Week, November 23, 2016
- NWHL Best Goaltender Award: 2017
- NWHL Player of the Week, Awarded January 22, 2018
- Isobel Cup Champion: 2018
- Isobel Cup Most Valuable Player (MVP): 2018
- NWHL All-Star: 2017, 2018

Preceded by Brittany Ott (2016)	NWHL Goaltender of the Year; 2017	Succeeded by Amanda Leveille (2018)
