= Kristin Lewicki =

American ice hockey player

- Born: June 10, 1995 (age 29); Moundsville, West Virginia, U.S.
- Height: 5 ft 2 in (157 cm)
- Position: Forward
- Shoots: Right
- NWHL team Former teams: Buffalo Beauts; PWHPA; Metropolitan Riveters; Adrian Bulldogs
- Playing career: 2013–present

Kristin Lewicki (born June 10, 1995) is an American ice hockey forward, currently playing with the Buffalo Beauts of the National Women's Hockey League (NWHL).

== Career ==
From 2013 to 2017, she attended Adrian College, scoring 179 points in 113 NCAA Division III games with the Adrian Bulldogs.

After graduating, she signed her first professional contract with the NWHL's Buffalo Beauts. She scored seven points in fourteen games in her rookie professional season. She was named to Team Leveille at the 2018 NWHL All-Star Game, and won fastest skater at the Skills Competition.

She left the Beauts to sign with the Metropolitan Riveters for the 2018–19 NWHL season, the first player from another team to join the Riveters that off-season. Despite being the reigning Isobel Cup champions, the Riveters suffered a number of problems that year, including the worst opening season stretch in league history, and Lewicki's production dropped significantly, only scoring one goal in sixteen games.

After the collapse of the Canadian Women's Hockey League (CWHL) in May 2019, she left the NWHL to join the newly formed Professional Women's Hockey Players Association (PWHPA). After spending most of the season with the organisation, she returned to the NWHL to re-join the Beauts, scoring six points in the last six games of the 2019–20 NWHL regular season.

She re-signed with the Beauts for the 2020–21 NWHL season.

=== Style of play ===
Lewicki is noted for her speed and acceleration. During the 2017–18 season, she was also relied on by the Beauts for her face-off skills, taking the third most face-offs on the team.

== Personal life ==
Lewicki has a degree in criminal justice with a minor in sports management from Adrian College.
