= Mallory Souliotis =

American ice hockey player (born 1996)

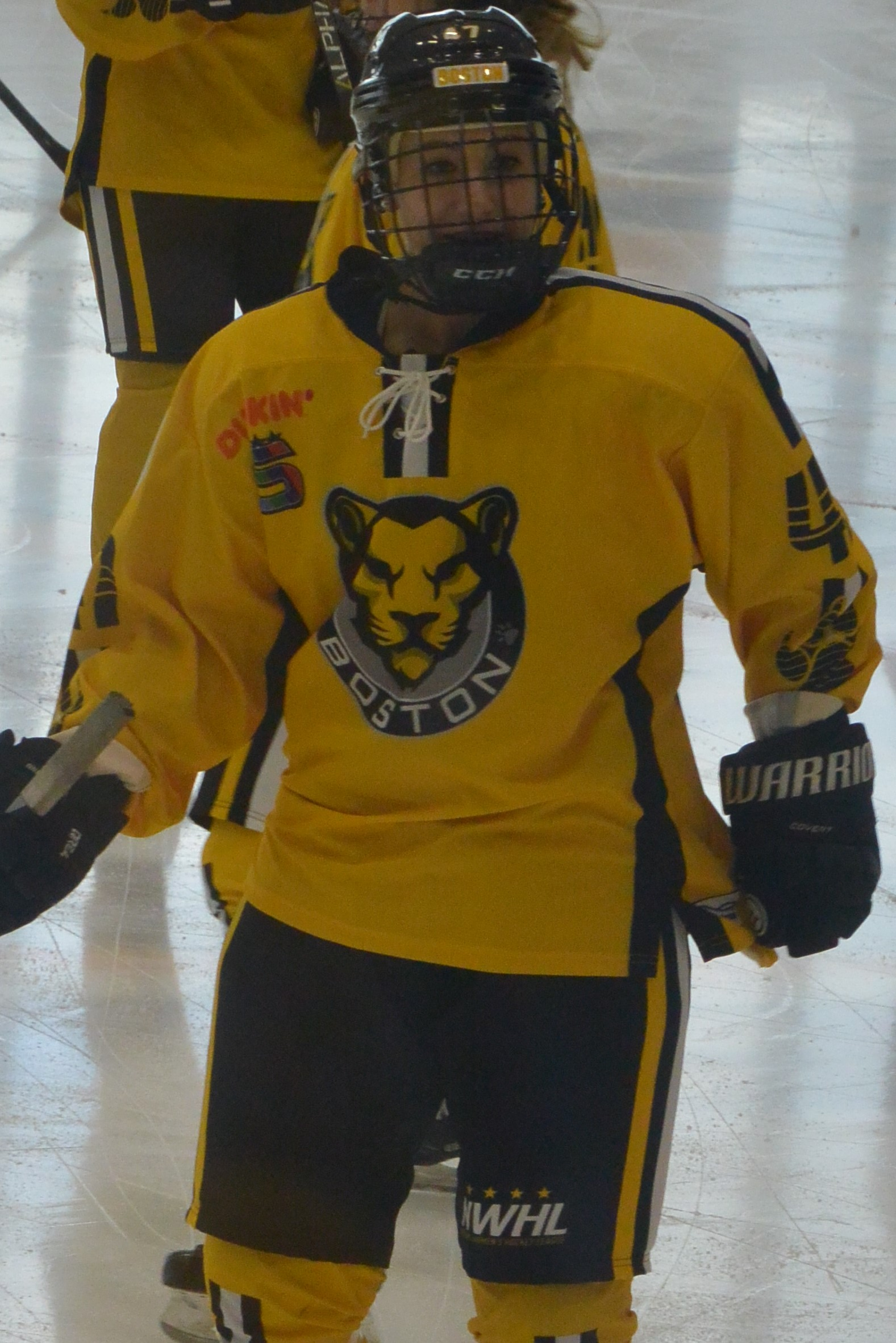
- Souliotis with the Boston Pride in 2019
- Born: April 1, 1996 (age 30) Acton, Massachusetts, U.S.
- Height: 5 ft 5 in (165 cm)
- Position: Defense
- Shoots: Right
- PHF team Former teams: Connecticut Whale; Boston Pride; Yale Bulldogs
- Playing career: 2014–present

Mallory Souliotis (born April 1, 1996) is a retired American professional ice hockey defenseman who played in the now defunct Premier Hockey Federation (PHF) with the Connecticut Whale.

== Career ==
=== Early career ===
During high school, Souliotis played for the Noble and Greenough School, being named to the NEPSAC Division 1 Second All-Star Team in 2014.

From 2014 to 2018, she attended Yale University, putting up 70 points in 117 NCAA games. She picked up 9 points in 26 games in her rookie collegiate season, being named her team's most improved player at the end of the year. Her production jumped up to 25 points in 29 games the following season, leading Yale in scoring and her 21 assists the third-highest single-season total in the university's history. In her senior year, she led all Ivy League defenders in scoring with 24 points in 31 games, and was named a First Team All-Ivy and a Third Team All-ECAC.

=== Professional ===
Souliotis was drafted 8th overall by the Boston Pride in the 2017 NWHL Draft. On the 1st of March 2018, she signed her first professional contract with the team, and played the remaining two games of the 2017–18 NWHL season, as well as the Pride's playoff quarterfinal loss.

In her first full season with the Pride, she scored 6 points in 14 games, finishing in the top 10 of the league for plus/minus. She scored her first professional goal in early December 2018 in a 5–2 victory over the Metropolitan Riveters. She was awarded the 2019 NWHL Foundation Award.

After the collapse of the Canadian Women's Hockey League in May 2019, Souliotis originally joined the newly formed Professional Women's Hockey Players Association and its strike of the upcoming season in North American women's hockey. She had previously spoken out in favour of the 2017 American National Team strike, stating that "these women deserve far better treatment and more compensation than they have gotten in the past". By June 2019, however, she chose to re-sign with the Pride, stating that she had not received clear answers to her questions from the PWHPA leadership and was concerned about the organisation's lack of clear direction. In her third NWHL season, she scored a career-high 16 points in 22 games, fifth in the league among defenders, as the Pride finished almost undefeated and made it to the Isobel Cup finals before the season was cancelled due to the COVID-19 pandemic in the United States.

She re-signed with the Pride ahead of the 2020–21 NWHL season.

== Style of play ==
Souliotis has been noted both for her powerful shot and her willingness to shoot on net, as well as her defensive reliability, consistently ranking among the best players in her league in plus/minus. She has compared her style of play to that of NHL defender Torey Krug, while Pride general manager Karilyn Pilch has stated that she "brings grit and great poise to our defensive zone."

She has also earned plaudits for her leadership, especially in the wider community. She pledged to donate earnings from her jersey and shirsey sales to the Epilepsy Foundation New England and Slap Out Epilepsy for the 2019–20 and 2021 NWHL seasons. During her time at Yale, she was involved with the Mandi Schwartz Foundation and the National Marrow Donor Program. In 2019, she ran a summer camp for girls' hockey called Mallory's Hockey Clinics along with Kaleigh Fratkin and Devan Taylor, stating that "It’s really a shame that there aren’t many girls hockey camps, especially when I was growing up, I would have loved going to camp with all girls."

== Personal life ==
Souliotis has a bachelor's degree in biomedical engineering from Yale University and a master's degree in bioengineering from the University of Maryland. She currently works in oncology research for EMD Serono. She is level 1 proficient in American Sign Language.

== Career statistics ==
			Regular season					Playoffs
Season	Team	League	GP	G	A	Pts	PIM	GP	G	A	Pts	PIM
2014–15	Yale Bulldogs	NCAA	26	1	8	9	6	-	-	-	-	-
2015–16	Yale Bulldogs	NCAA	29	4	21	25	6	-	-	-	-	-
2016–17	Yale Bulldogs	NCAA	31	3	9	12	20	-	-	-	-	-
2017–18	Yale Bulldogs	NCAA	31	4	20	24	12	-	-	-	-	-
2017-18	Boston Pride	NWHL	2	0	0	0	0	-	-	-	-	-
2018-19	Boston Pride	NWHL	14	3	3	6	4	1	0	0	0	0
2019-20	Boston Pride	NWHL	22	4	12	16	10	1	0	1	1	0
NWHL totals			38	7	15	22	14	2	0	1	1	0

== Awards and honors ==
- 2015-16 Second Team All-Ivy League
- 2017-18 First Team All-Ivy
- 2021 NWHL Foundation Award (Boston Pride representative)
- 2021 NWHL Fans' 3 Stars of the Season (shared with Carly Jackson and Mikyla Grant-Mentis)
