= Kelsey Koelzer =

American ice hockey defender & coach

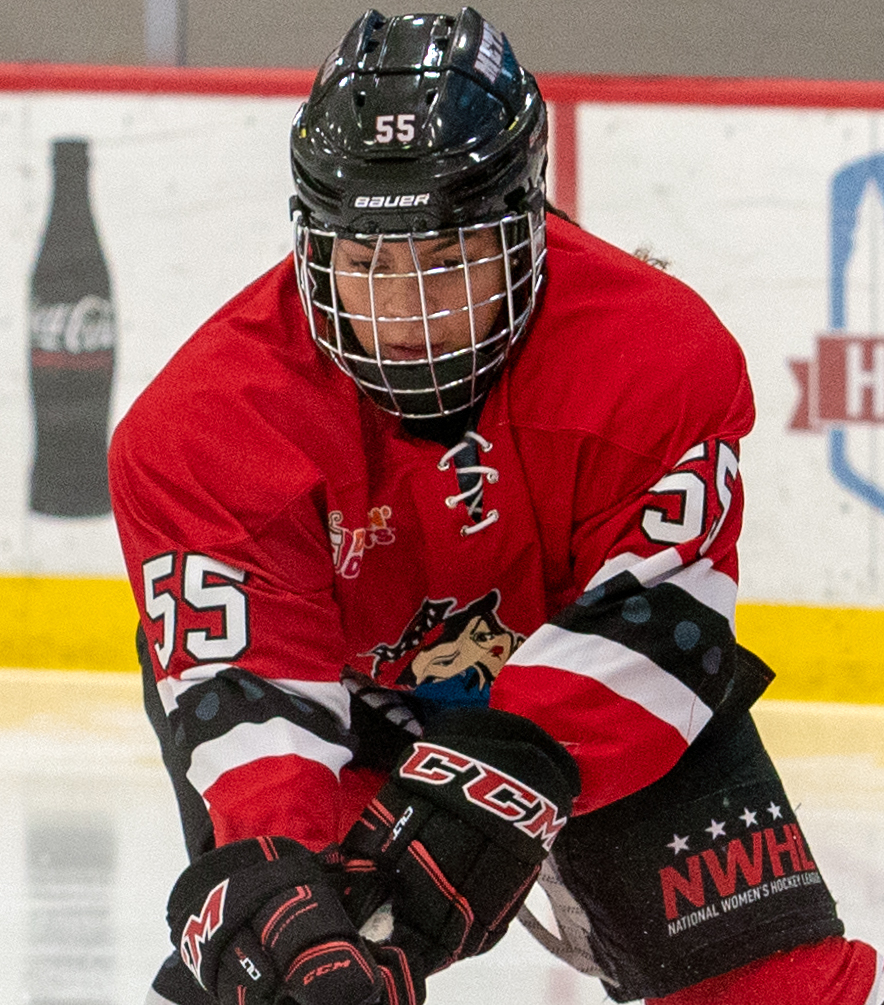
- Koelzer with the Metropolitan Riveters in 2018
- Born: June 16, 1995 (age 31) Horsham, Pennsylvania, United States
- Height: 5 ft 7 in (170 cm)
- Weight: 170 lb (77 kg; 12 st 2 lb)
- Position: Defense
- Shoots: Right
- Played for: PWHPA; Metropolitan Riveters; Princeton Tigers
- Playing career: 2013–present

Kelsey Koelzer (born June 16, 1995) is an American ice hockey defender, currently serving as head coach of the Arcadia University women's ice hockey program, the first black female head coach in NCAA ice hockey history, as well as the Advisor to the Commissioner on Diversity, Equity, and Inclusion for the NWHL. She was drafted 1st overall by the Metropolitan Riveters in the 2016 NWHL Draft, the first black player to be the first overall pick in a professional North American hockey league draft. She played two seasons in the National Women's Hockey League (NWHL) with the Riveters before joining the Professional Women's Hockey Players Association (PWHPA) in 2019.

== Playing career ==
Across 128 NCAA Division I games with the Princeton Tigers, Koelzer scored 100 points and was a Patty Kazmaier Award finalist in 2016 and 2017. She was named ECAC Hockey Best Defender of the Year in 2016. She was the first-ever Princeton's women's hockey first team All-American.

The New York Riveters selected her 1st overall in the 2016 NWHL Draft, the first black player to be the first overall pick in a professional North American hockey league draft.

She signed her first professional contract at the end of the 2016-17 NWHL regular season, and would make her first NWHL appearance in the Riveters' loss to the Buffalo Beauts in the semi-finals. She would go on to play two full seasons with the club, winning the Isobel Cup in 2018. She was named to Team Leveille for the 2018 NWHL All-Star Game, where she would be awarded All-Star Game MVP.

In May 2019, she joined the PWHPA. She would appear for Team Decker in the Dream Gap Tour exhibition in Philadelphia during the 2019–20 PWHPA season.

== Executive career ==
In September 2019, she was hired by Arcadia University as head coach for the new women's hockey programme. She is the first black female head coach in the history of NCAA ice hockey.

She is also a member of the NHL and NHLPA Female Hockey Advisory Committee. Along with Melissa Parnagian, she campaigned for the introduction of the Willie O'Ree Congressional Gold Medal Act.

On March 25, 2021, she was appointed to the role of Advisor to the Commissioner on Diversity, Equity, and Inclusion for the NWHL.

== Personal life ==
Koelzer has a degree in psychology from Princeton University.

She appeared in Ice Queens (2023), a documentary about the history of Black women in ice hockey.

== Career statistics ==
			Regular season					Playoffs
Season	Team	League	GP	G	A	Pts	PIM	GP	G	A	Pts	PIM
2016–17	Metropolitan Riveters	NWHL	–	–	–	–	–	1	0	0	0	0
2017–18	Metropolitan Riveters	NWHL	15	5	9	14	10	2	0	1	1	2
2018–19	Metropolitan Riveters	NWHL	14	0	0	0	12	1	0	0	0	0
2019–20	Tri-State	PWHPA	–	–	–	–	–	–	–	–	–	–
NWHL totals			29	5	9	14	22	4	0	1	1	2
