= Sydney Rossman =

American ice hockey player

- Born: May 27, 1995 (age 31) Excelsior, Minnesota, United States
- Height: 5 ft 5 in (165 cm)
- Position: Goaltender
- Caught: Left
- Played for: Minnesota Whitecaps; Connecticut Whale; Quinnipiac Bobcats
- Playing career: 2013–2019

Sydney Rossman (born May 27, 1995) is an American retired ice hockey goaltender, who played with both the Minnesota Whitecaps and the Connecticut Whale of the Premier Hockey Federation (PHF).

== Playing career ==
During her youth, Rossman trained with the Carroll Goalie School. While attending Minnetonka High School, she played with the Skippers girls' ice hockey team in the Minnesota Class AA of the Minnesota State High School League (MSHSL). In her senior season (2012–13), she was the recipient of the Let’s Play Hockey Senior Goalie of the Year and the Hobey Baker High School Character Award of Minnetonka High School, was named to the Minnesota All-Tournament Team, and earned Minnesota Academic All-State, Star Tribune All-Metro, Associated Press All-State honors, Minnesota Girls Hockey Coaches Association (MGHCA) All-State Honors, and All-Conference Honors .

From 2013 to 2017, she played with the Quinnipiac Bobcats women's ice hockey program in the ECAC Hockey conference of the NCAA Division I, playing in over 80 games. In the 2015–16 season, she posted a stellar 0.90 goals against average (GAA) and a .949 save percentage (SV%), earning the ECAC Goalie of the Year award and was a finalist for the ECAC Player of the Year.

She was drafted in the fifth round, 19th overall by the Connecticut Whale in the 2016 NWHL Draft, joining 14th pick Emma Woods as the first Quinnipiac players ever drafted into the PHF. After graduating from university, she signed her first professional contract with the Whale. She served as the team's starting goalie for the 2017–18 NWHL season, starting every single game in both the regular season and the playoffs. She was named to Team Ott for the 2018 NWHL All-Star Game, held in Minnesota.

After one season in Connecticut, she returned to her home state to sign with the Minnesota Whitecaps, as they transitioned from an independent team to a PHF team. She would spend the 2018–19 season serving as Amanda Leveille's backup, as the team won the Isobel Cup.

== Personal life ==
Rossman has a bachelor's degree in marketing and an MBA from Quinnipiac University. Presently, she works as an account manager with an omni-channel retail service company in Minneapolis.
