= Taylor Accursi =

Canadian ice hockey player

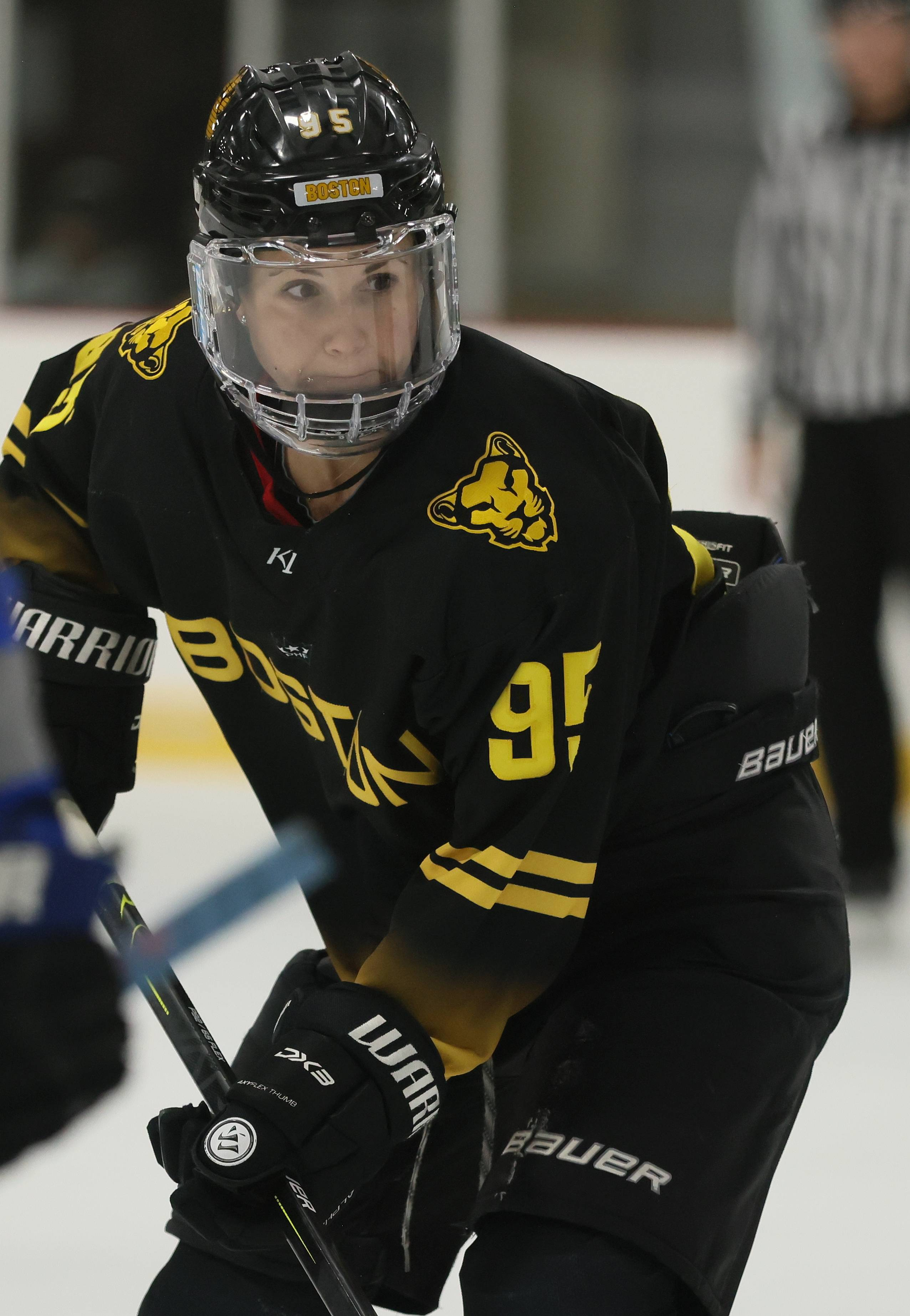
- Accursi with the Boston Pride in 2022
- Born: March 2, 1995 (age 31) Ancaster, Ontario, Canada
- Height: 173 cm (5 ft 8 in)
- Position: Forward
- Shoots: Left
- team Former teams: Free agent Boston Pride; Buffalo Beauts; Mercyhurst Lakers
- Playing career: 2013–present

Taylor Accursi (born March 2, 1995) is a Canadian ice hockey forward who is currently a free agent. She most recently played in the Premier Hockey Federation (PHF) with the Boston Pride.

== Career ==
During high school, she played for the Burlington Barracudas of the Provincial Women's Hockey League.

From 2013 to 2017, she attended Mercyhurst University in the United States, and played with the Mercyhurst Lakers women's ice hockey program in the College Hockey America (CHA) conference of the NCAA Division I. Across 123 games, she scored a total of 38 points. After struggling to produce in her first three seasons at Mercyhurst – she recorded only 15 points from the 2013–14 season to the 2015–16 season – she had a breakout senior campaign, scoring 23 points in 35 games of her final season.

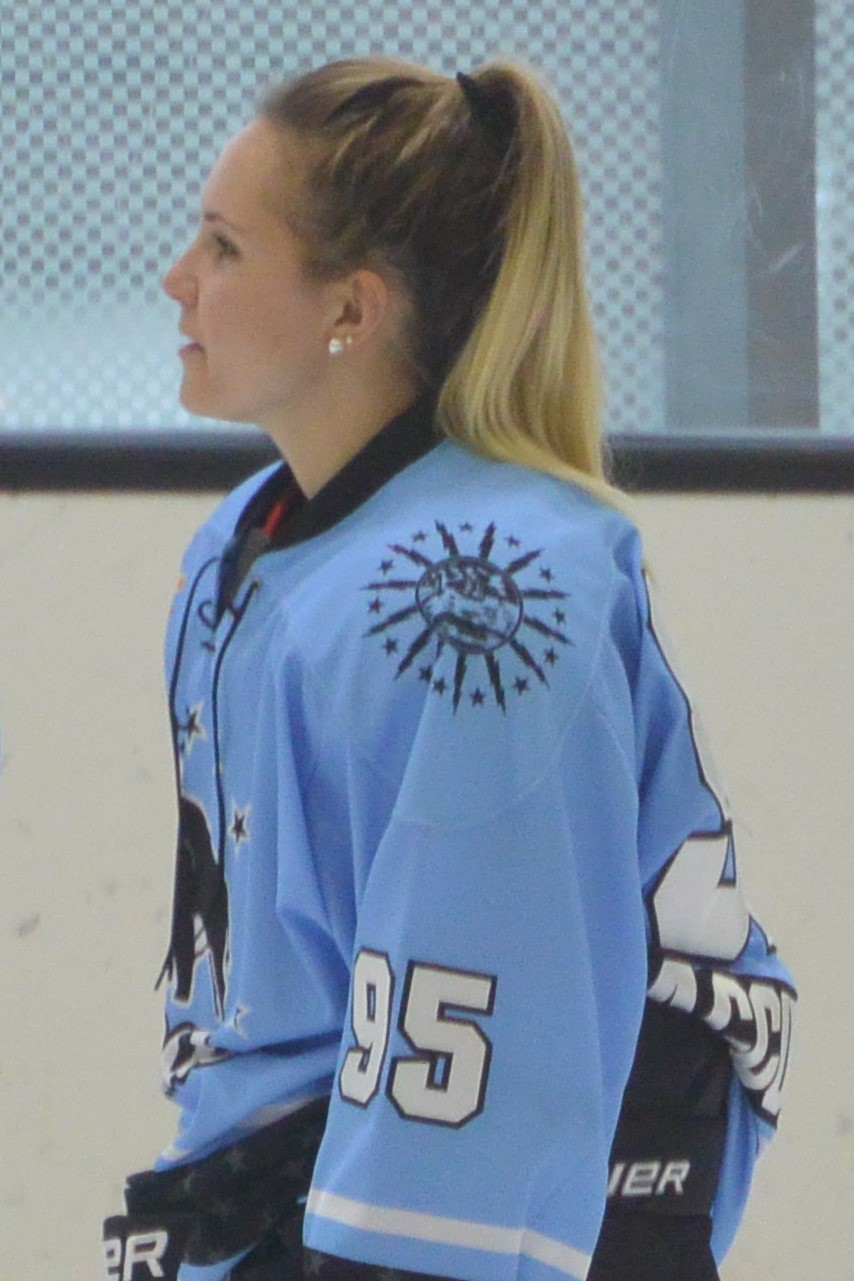
Accursi with the Buffalo Beauts in 2018

After graduating, she planned to retire from ice hockey and become a police officer, until her sister convinced her to try out for the Buffalo Beauts of the National Women's Hockey League (NWHL; rebranded as PHF in 2021). She scored her first career NWHL goal in October 2017 in a 3–2 victory over the Connecticut Whale, the opening goal of the 2017–18 NWHL season.

In the 2019–20 season, she put up 25 points in 24 games, including 16 goals, and finished in the league's top-5 scorers. Her contributions were not enough to carry the Beauts to the playoffs and they were eliminated in the play-in game against the Whale before the playoff semi-finals. She was named to Team Dempsey for the 2020 NWHL All-Star Game. She scored a career-high four goals in a single game in the 2019 Buffalo Believes Classic, the NWHL's inaugural outdoor game, scoring all four in the third period to bring the Beauts back from a three-goal deficit (the Riveters ultimately won the game 7–4).

She re-signed with the Beauts for the 2020–21 NWHL season, the first player on the team to re-sign and was named team captain. However, after being unable to secure a full two weeks off her job outside of hockey, she was forced to opt-out of the bubble season.

== Style of play ==
Often described as a natural goalscorer, Accursi has been noted for her speed, acceleration, and her stickhandling skills. In 2017, Nate Oliver, who would later become Beauts' general manager, compared her stickhandling to Pavel Datsyuk, stating that "like Houdini, she is a bit of an escape artist. A small opening and, zoom, she’s gone." When asked to describe her own style of play, she stated that "I like to score goals... definitely score goals." She has also received attention for her goal celebrations.

== Personal life ==
Outside of hockey, Accursi works as a police officer for the Halton Regional Police. Prior to this, she was police officer with the Ontario Provincial Police from 2020- 2023. Her sister, Hunter Accursi, also plays for the Beauts. She is related to former National Lacrosse League player Mike Accursi.

== Career statistics ==
			Regular season					Playoffs
Season	Team	League	GP	G	A	Pts	PIM	GP	G	A	Pts	PIM
2017-18	Buffalo Beauts	NWHL	15	6	5	11	8	2	0	0	0	2
2018-19	Buffalo Beauts	NWHL	13	4	2	6	2	2	0	0	0	0
2019-20	Buffalo Beauts	NWHL	24	16	9	25	16	1	0	1	1	0
2020-21	Buffalo Beauts	NWHL	0	0	0	0	0	–	–	–	–	–
2021-22	Buffalo Beauts	PHF	14	3	8	11	6	1	0	0	0	0
PHF/NWHL totals			66	29	24	53	32	6	0	1	1	2
