= 2nd NWHL All-Star Game =

Ice hockey match in Pittsburgh

	1	2	3	Total
Team Steadman	2	5	3	10
Team Kessel	3	5	3	11
- Date: February 12, 2017
- Arena: UPMC Lemieux Sports Complex
- City: Pittsburgh, PA, United States
- MVP: Amanda Kessel

The 2nd NWHL All-Star Game took place at the UPMC Lemieux Sports Complex on February 12, 2017 in Pittsburgh, Pennsylvania. A skills competition was held the day prior on February 11, 2017.

This edition of the All-Star Game featured a "fantasy draft" format in order to determine the rosters. The team captains were Amanda Kessel from the New York Riveters, and forward Kelley Steadman, who was the MVP of the 2016 NWHL All-Star Game, from the Buffalo Beauts.

== Selected players ==
=== Fan voting ===
Over 20,000 votes were cast in order to select four more players to add to the All-Star Game rosters.

Player	Nationality	Team	# of votes
Harrison Browne	Canada	Buffalo Beauts	
Gigi Marvin	United States	Boston Pride	
Madison Packer	United States	New York Riveters	
Rebecca Russo	United States	New York Riveters	

=== Media selection ===
A group of NWHL reporters were given the ability to choose two players to attend the All-Star Game on 6 January 2016.

Player	Nationality	Team
Ashley Johnston	Canada	New York Riveters
Kelly Babstock	Canada	Connecticut Whale

== Rosters ==
Team Kessel
Player	Team	Pos.	Nat.
Brittany Ott	Boston Pride	Goaltender	(United States)
Nicole Stock	Connecticut Whale	Goaltender	(United States)
Kacey Bellamy	Boston Pride	Defense	(United States)
Megan Bozek	Buffalo Beauts	Defense	(United States)
Courtney Burke	New York Riveters	Defense	(United States)
Gigi Marvin	Boston Blades	Defense	(United States)
Harrison Browne	Buffalo Beauts	Forward	(Canada)
Meghan Duggan	Boston Pride	Forward	(United States)
Zoe Hickel	Boston Pride (traded to Connecticut before deadline)	Forward	(United States)
Amanda Kessel	New York Riveters	Forward	(United States)
Hilary Knight	Boston Pride	Forward	(United States)
Rebecca Russo	New York Riveters	Forward	(United States)
Kelli Stack	Connecticut Whale	Forward	(United States)
Dana Trivigno	Connecticut Whale	Forward	(United States)

Team Steadman
Player	Team	Pos.	Nat.
Katie Fitzgerald	New York Riveters	Goaltender	(United States)
Brianne McLaughlin	Buffalo Beauts	Goaltender	(United States)
Blake Bolden	Boston Pride	Defense	(United States)
Kaleigh Fratkin	New York Riveters	Defense	(Canada)
Ashley Johnston	New York Riveters	Defense	(Canada)
Emily Pfalzer	Buffalo Beauts	Defense	(United States)
Kelly Babstock	Connecticut Whale	Forward	(Canada)
Corinne Buie	Buffalo Beauts	Forward	(United States)
Alex Carpenter	Boston Pride	Forward	(United States)
Shiann Darkangelo	Buffalo Beauts	Forward	(United States)
Brianna Decker	Boston Pride	Forward	(United States)
Madison Packer	New York Riveters	Forward	(United States)
Haley Skarupa	Connecticut Whale	Forward	(United States)
Kelley Steadman	Buffalo Beauts	Forward	(United States)

== Game summary ==
The All-Star Game started with a 3-2 lead for Team Kessel, as they emerged victorious in the Skills Competition held on February 10, 2017, which saw both teams compete in a series of five skills events. A pair of twenty-five minute periods was staged at the All-Star Game, rather than the traditional format of three twenty-minute periods.

In the first period, Team Steadman scored the first goal, as Brianna Decker scored against Team Kessel goaltender Brittany Ott. Rookie Alexandra Carpenter was credited with the assist on Decker’s goal, as the score was now tied 3-3.

Kessel would score an unassisted goal on Team Steadman goaltender Brianne McLaughlin to reclaim the lead. Before the period would expire, a total of 10 goals were scored, with Team Kessel claiming an 8-7 lead.

Goals for Team Kessel were scored by Megan Bozek, Rebecca Russo and Harrison Browne, while Kessel scored another. Madison Packer would score twice for Team Steadman. Other Team Steadman scorers in the first included Emily Pfalzer and Kelly Babstock, the first (and only) Canadian-born player to score a goal in the game.

The second period saw Katie Fitzgerald between the pipes for Team Steadman, while Nicole Stock guarded the crease for Team Kessel. Harrison Browne would score another goal, while Hilary Knight also added her name to the scoresheet.

Team Steadman’s other scorers in the second period included Haley Skarupa, Carpenter and Steadman. Of note, Steadman would score to tie the game at 10-apiece. An empty net goal by Kessel would win the game for her team, as she recorded the first hat trick in NWHL All-Star Game history. For her efforts, she was recognized as the Game’s Most Valuable Player.

=== Skills competition ===
- Fastest skater: Rebecca Russo
- Hardest shot: Blake Bolden
- Shooting accuracy: Kelley Steadman
