= Ashley Johnston =

Canadian ice hockey defender (born 1992)

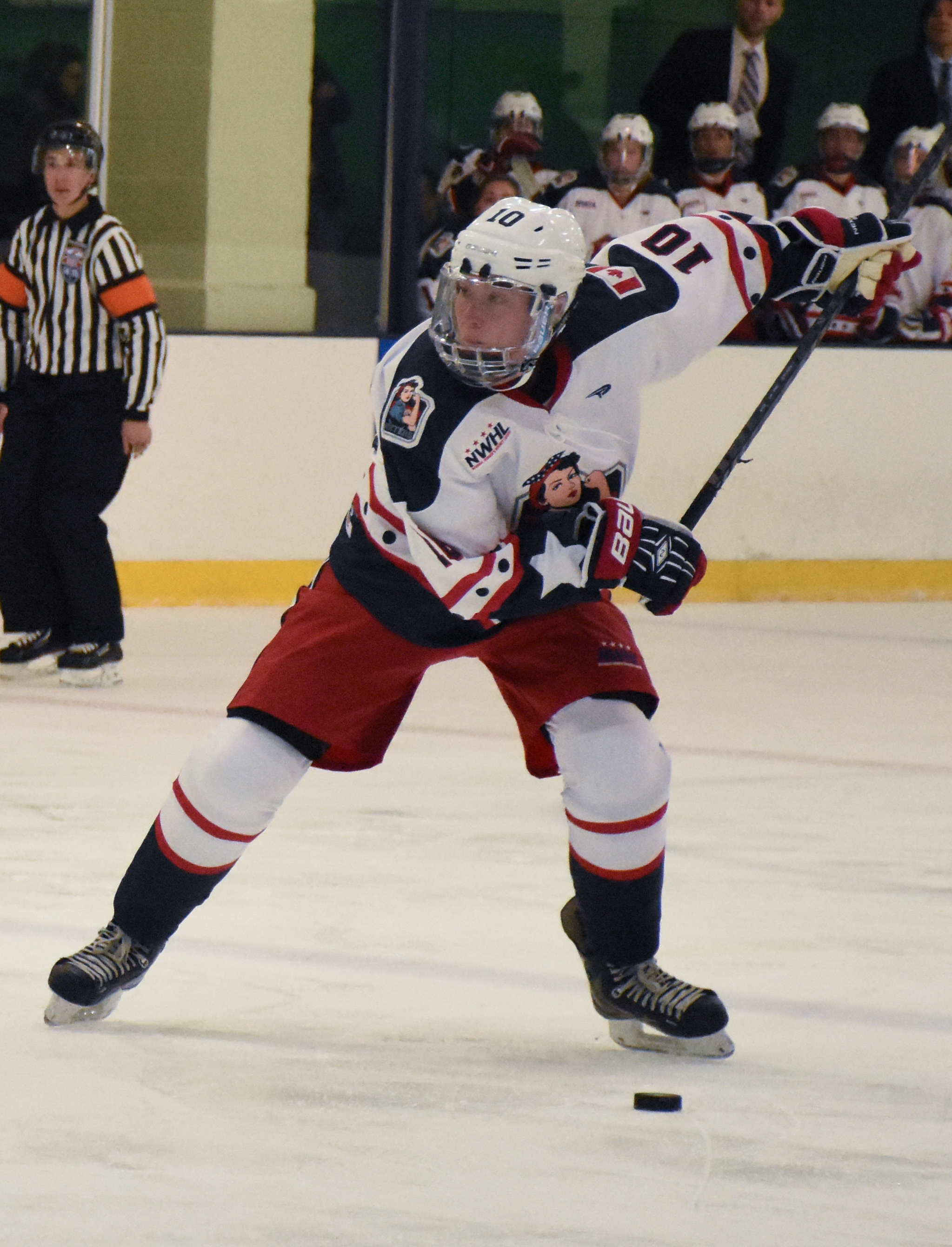
- Johnston with the New York Riveters in 2015
- Born: July 17, 1992 (age 34) Burlington, Ontario, Canada
- Height: 183 cm (6 ft 0 in)
- Position: Defenceman
- Shot: Left
- Played for: New York/Metropolitan Riveters (PHF); Union Dutchwomen; Burlington Barracudas
- Playing career: 2015–2020

Ashley Johnston (born 17 July 1992) is a Canadian former professional ice hockey defender and former assistant coach of the Premier Hockey Federation's Metropolitan Riveters. Known for her gritty, stay-at-home style of play as a shutdown defender, she was the first player to serve as team captain in Riveters history, a role she would hold for three years until her initial retirement.

== Playing career ==
=== Early career ===
Johnston was born in 1992 in Burlington, Ontario, and is a graduate of Union College, where she played for the Union Dutchwomen ice hockey team. In the 2013-14 Union season, Johnston served as team captain.

=== Professional career ===
Johnston joined the New York Riveters for the Premier Hockey Federation's (PHF) inaugural season in 2015–16 as a defenseman. She was elected as the franchise's first captain.

On 18 April 2016, Johnston signed a one-year contract worth $13,500 with the New York Riveters for the 2016–17 season, although salaries throughout the league were later cut up to 50% during the season. Johnston was selected for the 2017 All-Star Game as a media pick. Johnston was awarded the Denna Laing Award by the NWHL for her performance in the 2016–17 season, as selected by the Premier Hockey Federation Players' Association.

On 25 May 2017, Johnston re-signed with the New York Riveters for the 2017–18 season, continuing as captain. In October 2017, the New York Riveters were renamed the Metropolitan Riveters as part of a deal with the New Jersey Devils of the National Hockey League as the team was playing in Newark, New Jersey. The Riveters won the Isobel Cup that season, with Johnston earning her first career playoff point with an assist.

Following the 2017–18 season, Johnston announced her retirement from hockey. She made a comeback to return to the team for the 2019–20 season, earning three points in ten games. In May 2020, she announced her retirement to join the Riveters' coaching staff as an assistant coach. She had previously spent time as an assistant coach with the club while injured during the 2017–18 season.

== Officiating ==
Following her retirement from professional hockey, Johnston began pursuing a career in hockey officiating for both men's and women's hockey, while also attending medical school at Georgetown University. In 2026, she was named as a linesperson for the 2026 IIHF Women's World Championship.

== Career statistics ==
			Regular Season					Playoffs
Season	Team	League	GP	G	A	Pts	PIM	GP	G	A	Pts	PIM
2015–16	New York Riveters	PHF	16	1	6	7	8	2	0	0	0	0
2016–17	New York Riveters	PHF	17	2	1	3	6	1	0	0	0	0
2017–18	Metropolitan Riveters	PHF	14	1	1	2	10	2	0	1	1	0
2019–20	Metropolitan Riveters	PHF	10	0	3	3	2	1	0	0	0	2
PHF totals			57	4	11	15	26	6	0	1	1	2

== Awards and honours ==
- 2012-13 Ashley Kilstein Award (Union Hockey Award)
- 2013-14 Ashley Kilstein Award (Union Hockey Award)

== Personal life ==
Outside of hockey, Johnston works as a mechanical engineer.
