= Miye D'Oench =

American ice hockey forward (born 1994)

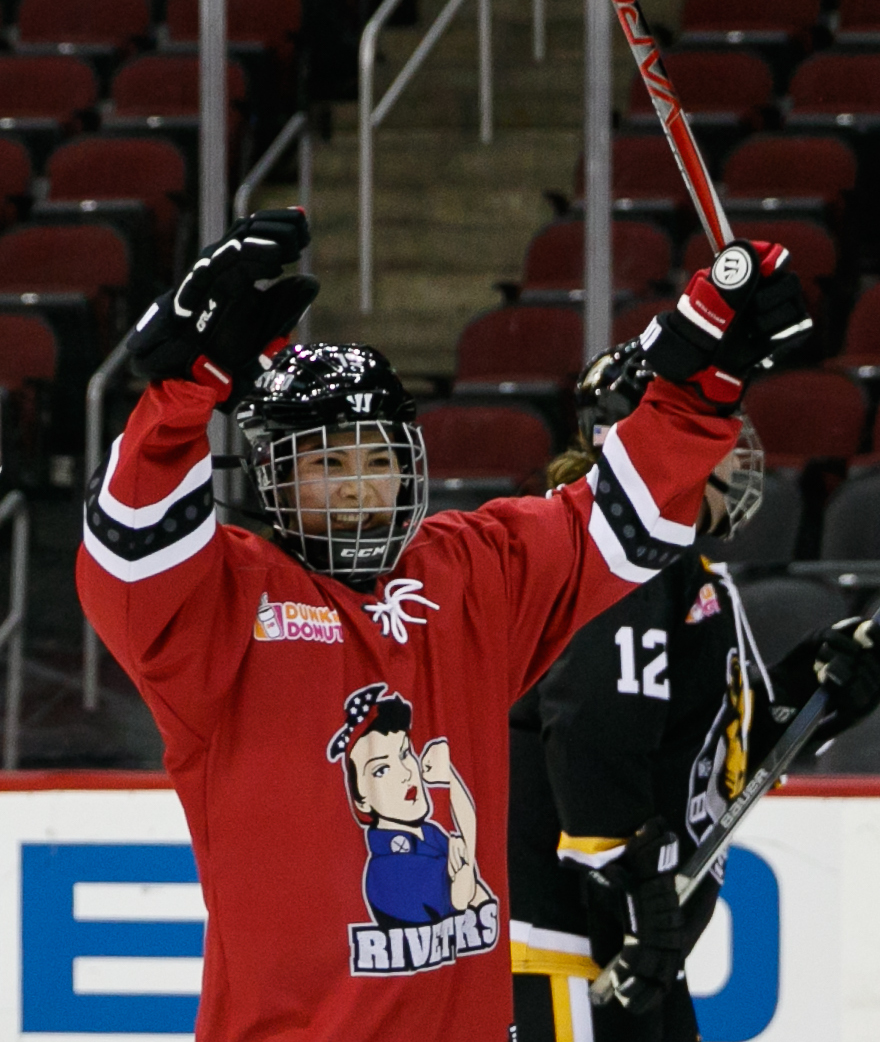
- D'Oench with the Metropolitan Riveters in 2017
- Born: January 26, 1994 (age 32) New York City, United States
- Height: 5 ft 4 in (163 cm)
- Weight: 116 lb (53 kg; 8 st 4 lb)
- Position: Forward
- Shot: Right
- Played for: Metropolitan Riveters; Harvard Crimson
- National team: United States
- Playing career: 2016–2019

Miye D'Oench (born January 26, 1994) is an American former professional ice hockey player for the Metropolitan Riveters in the National Women's Hockey League (NWHL).

== Playing career ==
Across 135 NCAA games with the Harvard Crimson women's ice hockey program, D'Oench put up 122 points, the 24th player in the university's history to reach 100 points. She was named to the All-ECAC Hockey second team and All-Ivy League second team in her final year.

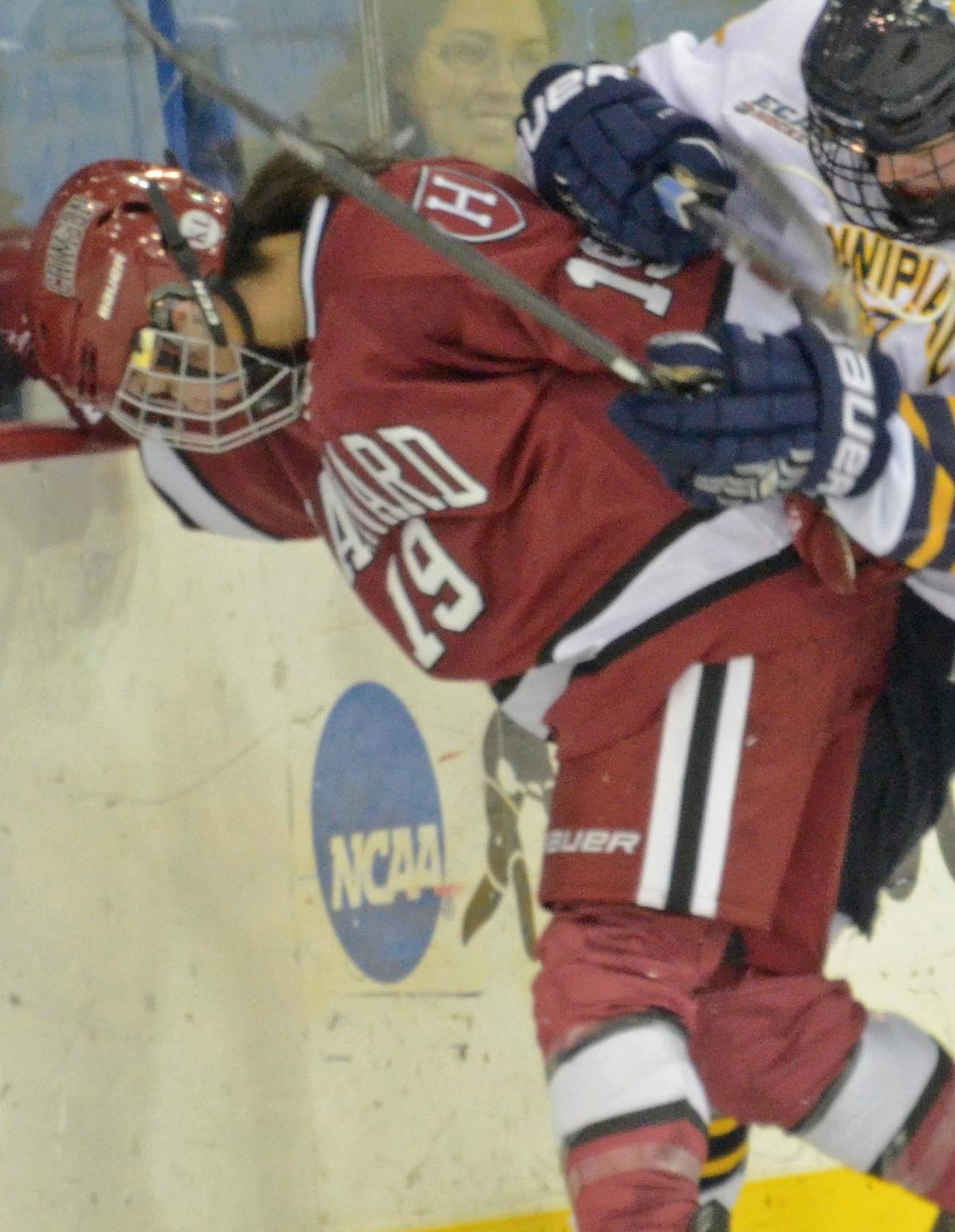
D'Oench with Harvard in 2014

In 2015, she was drafted 15th overall by the Boston Pride of the NWHL. In April 2016, the Pride traded her rights to the Metropolitan Riveters in exchange for the rights to Alex Carpenter. She would play three seasons with the Riveters, putting up 34 points in 36 games. She would miss half of the 2018 regular season with an ankle injury, before returning for the playoffs as the team won the Isobel Cup.

In March 2019, she retired from professional hockey, to return to university and study to become a lawyer.

=== International ===
D'Oench represented the United States at the 2012 IIHF World Women's U18 Championship, getting two goals in five games as the country won the silver medal. She attended several training camps for the senior national team, including for the 2018 Olympic team, but was not selected to the final US roster for any international tournaments.

== Personal life ==
D'Oench was born and raised in Battery Park City, New York on Manhattan's Upper West Side. She is of Japanese descent.

From 2016 to 2018, D'Oench worked for the New York County District Attorney, before leaving to become a field organiser for Amy McGrath, in her campaign for a seat in the US Congress. She is currently studying at Stanford Law School.

== Career statistics ==
			Regular season					Playoffs
Season	Team	League	GP	G	A	Pts	PIM	GP	G	A	Pts	PIM
2016-17	Metropolitan Riveters	NWHL	18	5	9	14	10	1	0	1	1	2
2017-18	Metropolitan Riveters	NWHL	9	7	6	13	11	2	0	2	2	0
2018-19	Metropolitan Riveters	NWHL	9	1	6	7	4	2	0	2	2	4
NWHL totals			36	13	21	34	14	5	0	5	5	6
