= Jenna Rheault =

American ice hockey defender

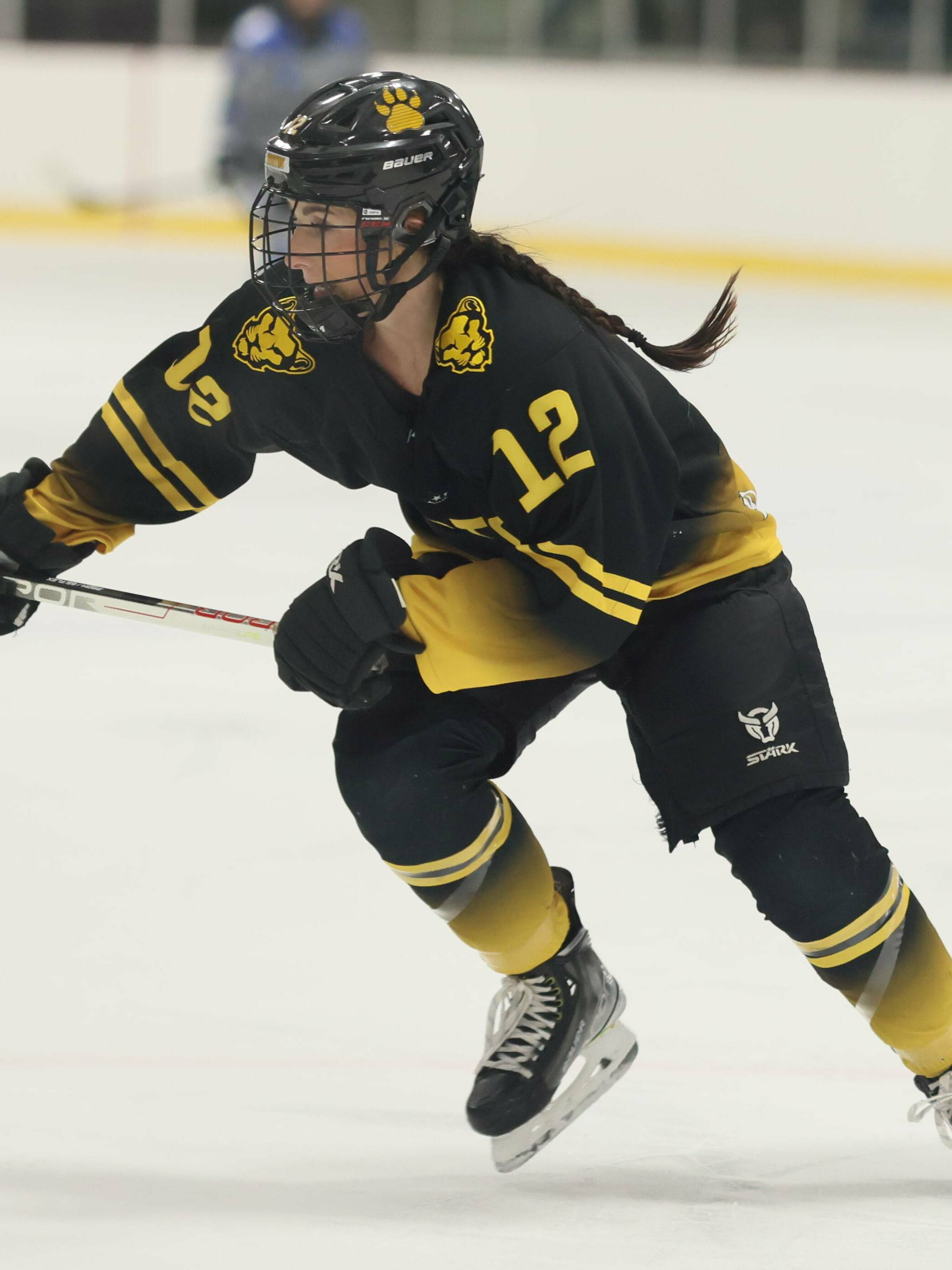
- Rheault with the Boston Pride in 2022
- Born: June 6, 1996 (age 29) Deering, New Hampshire, U.S.
- Height: 171 cm (5 ft 7 in)
- Position: Defender
- Shoots: Right
- PHF team: Boston Pride
- Played for: New Hampshire Wildcats
- Playing career: 2019–present

Jenna Rheault (born June 6, 1996) is an American ice hockey defender who played for the Boston Pride of the now defunct Premier Hockey Federation.

== Career ==
During high school, she played for St. Paul's School, winning a NEPSAC championship and being awarded the ISL Award of Excellence. At St. Paul's, she also captained the girls' soccer team and played for the school's softball team.

From 2015 to 2019, she attended the University of New Hampshire, scoring a total of 24 points in 142 NCAA games. She picked up 3 points in 36 games in her rookie year with the university, notching her first collegiate goal in October 2015 against Clarkson and finishing the year third on her team in blocked shots. She performed consistently throughout the next two years, scoring five points and six points respectively and placing among her team's leaders in blocked shots both years. She had a breakout year in her senior season, doubling her point production to reach 10 points in 35 games, and winning the UNH Athletics Colleen Coyne Best Defensive Player Award and Tina True Award for dedication to strength and conditioning. That year, she was also inducted into the Chi Alpha Sigma honour society for student athletes.

She was selected 25th overall by the Pride in the 2018 NWHL Draft. She would become the first player from that draft class to sign in the NWHL when she joined the Pride in May 2019 on a $7,500 contract. She would put up 6 points in 24 games in her rookie season, as the Pride finished almost undefeated and made it to the Isobel Cup finals before the season was cancelled due to the COVID-19 pandemic in the United States. She scored her first professional goal against Kelsey Neumann in late December 2019, scoring the game-winning goal in overtime as the Pride came back from a three-goal deficit against the Buffalo Beauts.

She re-signed with the Pride ahead of the 2020–21 NWHL season. She broke her wrist in the second game of the season, in a collision with Kayla Meneghin, and was forced to miss the rest of the season.

== International career ==
Rheault participated in the USA National Development Camp from 2009 to 2012, but has yet to make an appearance for the American national team.

== Style of play ==
Rheault has been described as a stay-at-home defender, noted for consistency and shot-blocking abilities, ranking among the top four shot-blockers on the Wildcats every year during her time in the NCAA and finishing fourth on the Pride in her rookie professional season. As a defensive player, she has been noted for relying on her hockey IQ instead of her physicality, rarely racking up penalty minutes, and her skating skills.

== Personal life ==
Rheault has a master's degree in Occupational Therapy from the University of New Hampshire. Her brother, Jon Rheault, recently played ice hockey professionally for the Nottingham Panthers in the EIHL, and her father, Jonathan Rheault, played hockey for Colgate University in the late 1970s. Rheault works as a Certified Occupational Therapist at Hillsboro-Deering Elementary School in Hillsboro, NH.
