= Jon Rheault =

American professional ice hockey player (born 1986)

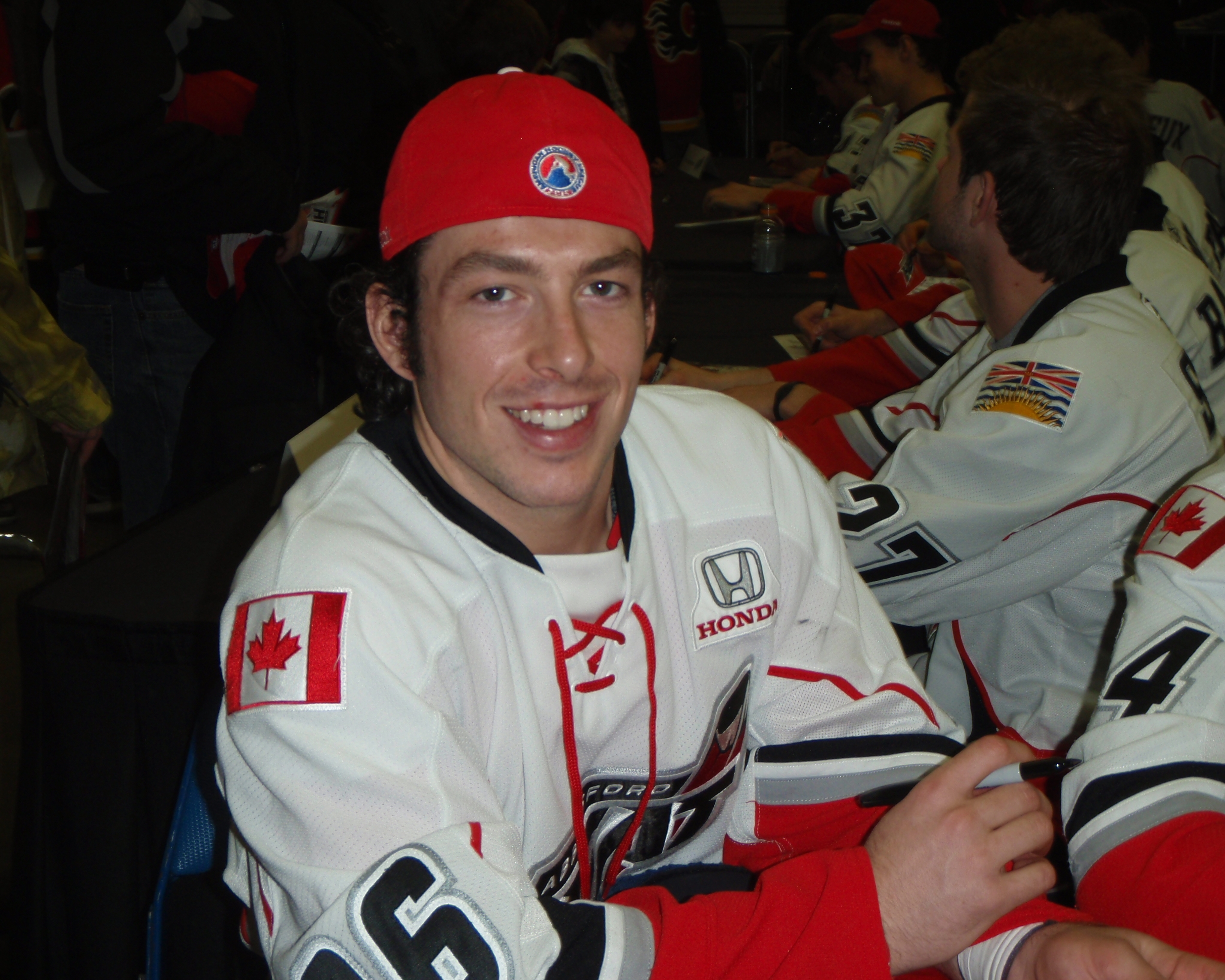
- Born: August 1, 1986 (age 40) Arlington, Texas, U.S.
- Height: 5 ft 11 in (180 cm)
- Weight: 200 lb (91 kg; 14 st 4 lb)
- Position: Right wing
- Shot: Right
- Played for: Florida Panthers; Adler Mannheim; EHC Visp; EC KAC; Nottingham Panthers
- NHL draft: 145th overall, 2006; Philadelphia Flyers
- Playing career: 2008–2020
- Website: JonRheault.com

Jonathan Williamson Rheault (born August 1, 1986) is an American former professional ice hockey player who last played for the Nottingham Panthers in the Elite Ice Hockey League (EIHL). Rheault was born in Arlington, Texas, but grew up in Deering, New Hampshire.

== Playing career ==
Raised in Deering, New Hampshire, Rheault attended Providence College from 2004 to 2008 and was selected by the Philadelphia Flyers in the 5th round (145th overall) of the 2006 NHL entry draft. Coming out of college, he played his first games as a professional hockey player with AHL's Manchester Monarchs. He also spent time with the Ontario Reign of the East Coast Hockey League and on June 16, 2010, he was signed as a free agent by the Abbotsford Heat. After two successful seasons with the Heat in the AHL, Rheault was signed to a one-year NHL contract with the Florida Panthers of the NHL on July 2, 2012.

With the 2012 NHL lockout in effect, Rheault was directly assigned to AHL affiliate, the San Antonio Rampage to begin the 2012–13 season. In producing 37 points through 50 games with the Rampage, Rheault received his first NHL recall by the Panthers on March 5, 2013. He made his long-awaited NHL debut that night, in a 4-1 home victory over the Winnipeg Jets.

On July 2, 2013, Rheault signed his first European contract with German club Adler Mannheim. During his three-year stint at Mannheim, he won the German championship in 2015. As a member of the Adler squad, he competed in the German top-flight Deutsche Eishockey Liga, the Champions Hockey League and the 2015 Spengler Cup.

Leaving Mannheim after three years, he moved to EHC Visp of the Swiss second-tier National League B (NLB) in May 2016. Following a season in Austria with EC KAC of the EBEL, Rheault continued his journeyman career in agreeing to a one-year contract with British club, Nottingham Panthers, of the EIHL on June 5, 2018.

== Personal life ==
His sister, Jenna Rheault, currently plays ice hockey professionally for the Boston Pride in the NWHL.

== Career statistics ==
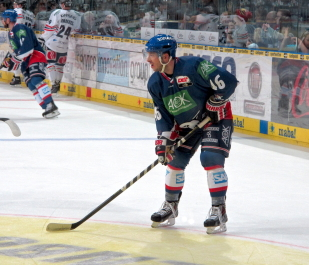
Rheault with Adler Mannheim.

			Regular season					Playoffs
Season	Team	League	GP	G	A	Pts	PIM	GP	G	A	Pts	PIM
2003–04	New England Jr. Coyotes	EJHL	36	34	27	61	84	—	—	—	—	—
2004–05	Providence College	HE	36	11	8	19	36	—	—	—	—	—
2005–06	Providence College	HE	35	16	14	30	29	—	—	—	—	—
2006–07	Providence College	HE	35	12	13	25	38	—	—	—	—	—
2007–08	Providence College	HE	36	17	14	31	23	—	—	—	—	—
2008–09	Manchester Monarchs	AHL	24	2	3	5	12	—	—	—	—	—
2008–09	Ontario Reign	ECHL	51	19	22	41	56	7	4	4	8	4
2009–10	Ontario Reign	ECHL	30	19	16	35	24	—	—	—	—	—
2009–10	Providence Bruins	AHL	4	0	0	0	4	—	—	—	—	—
2009–10	Manchester Monarchs	AHL	35	3	3	6	14	—	—	—	—	—
2009–10	Abbotsford Heat	AHL	5	3	2	5	0	13	6	2	8	2
2010–11	Abbotsford Heat	AHL	79	12	22	34	46	—	—	—	—	—
2011–12	Abbotsford Heat	AHL	47	16	17	33	29	8	3	1	4	0
2012–13	San Antonio Rampage	AHL	67	20	28	48	40	—	—	—	—	—
2012–13	Florida Panthers	NHL	5	0	0	0	0	—	—	—	—	—
2013–14	Adler Mannheim	DEL	41	12	13	25	30	5	1	2	3	0
2014–15	Adler Mannheim	DEL	49	14	22	36	24	15	4	5	9	6
2015–16	Adler Mannheim	DEL	48	5	11	16	50	3	2	1	3	0
2016–17	EHC Visp	SUI.2	29	18	19	37	20	—	—	—	—	—
2017–18	EC KAC	AUT	47	6	15	21	16	6	1	0	1	2
2018–19	Nottingham Panthers	EIHL	30	6	10	16	26	3	0	1	1	0
2019–20	Nottingham Panthers	EIHL	33	2	7	9	8	—	—	—	—	—
AHL totals			261	56	75	131	145	21	9	3	12	2
NHL totals			5	0	0	0	0	—	—	—	—	—
DEL totals			138	31	46	77	104	23	7	8	15	6

== Awards and honours ==
Award	Year
College
HE All-Academic Team	2007, 2008
