= Karilyn Pilch =

American ice hockey executive

- Born: December 17, 1986 (age 39) Salem, New Hampshire, United States
- Height: 171 cm (5 ft 7 in)
- Position: Goaltender
- Played for: Boston University
- Playing career: 2005–2007

Karilyn Pilch (born December 17, 1986) is an American professional ice hockey executive and former general manager of the Boston Pride in the PHF. Currently, she is employed by the NHL's Chicago Blackhawks.

== Early life ==
Pilch was born on December 17, 1986, in Salem, New Hampshire, United States to parents Maureen and Frank. While attending Salem High School, Pilch became the first female to play for the Salem High varsity hockey team.

== Career ==
=== Boston University ===
Upon graduating from high school, Pilch went on to play nine games as a backup goalie for Boston University. She earned her first win at Boston University on October 15, 2005, in a 6–2 win over Union College. Pilch graduated from Boston University cum laude from the Questrom School of Business in 2009 and served as an assistant coach for Saint Anselm College. She left the college in 2016 to become the Director of Hockey Operations at Boston University.

=== NWHL ===
Pilch would stay at the university until being hired as general manager of the Boston Pride for the 2019–20 season. In her first year with the Pride, the team finished as regular-season champions, making it to the Isobel Cup finals before the playoffs were postponed by the COVID-19 pandemic. As a result of the teams' success, Pilch signed a multi-year contract to remain with the Pride. When the league returned in 2021, she guided the team to their second Isobel Cup in franchise history.
