= 2017–18 NWHL season =

- League: National Women's Hockey League
- Sport: Ice hockey

2017 draft
- Top draft pick: Katie Burt
- Picked by: Boston Pride

Regular season
- Season champions: Metropolitan Riveters
- Season MVP: Alexa Gruschow
- Top scorer: Alexa Gruschow

Isobel Cup
- Champions: Metropolitan Riveters
- Runners-up: Buffalo Beauts
- Finals MVP: Katie Fitzgerald

NWHL seasons
- 2016–17 2018–19

The 2017–18 NWHL season was the third season of the National Women's Hockey League. All four teams from the previous two seasons returned for this season: the Boston Pride, Buffalo Beauts, Connecticut Whale, and the Metropolitan Riveters.

== League news and notes ==
- In October 2017, the Russian women's national team participated in exhibition series, called the 2017 Summit Series, going 5–0 against the Pride, Riveters, and Whale. The Beauts played one game against the Chinese national team, which the Beauts won 4–2.
- A Battle of the Sexes match was scheduled between the Buffalo Beauts and Buffalo Jr. Sabres 15U youth team for October 16 with the Jr. Sabres 15U winning 9–4.
- On October 5, the New York Riveters partnered with the New Jersey Devils of the National Hockey League. The Riveters, having played in Newark, New Jersey, the previous season, rebranded as the Metropolitan Riveters. As part of the partnership, the Riveters had their opening home game at the Prudential Center.
- On December 14, the NWHL announced that they are playing USA Hockey Women's National Team in Tampa Bay for two exhibition matches for January playing at the U.S. Women's National Team's training complex at Florida Hospital Center Ice.
- On December 21, the Buffalo Beauts were acquired by their landlord, Pegula Sports and Entertainment; Pegula owns several sports teams in the Buffalo area, including the NHL's Buffalo Sabres.

=== Head coaching and front office personnel changes ===
==== Head coaches ====
Team	2016–17 head coach	2017–18 replacement	Notes
Boston Pride	Bobby Jay	Thomas Pöck	Former NHL player and Austrian-born Pöck became the first European coach in NWHL history.

== Regular season ==
=== News and notes ===
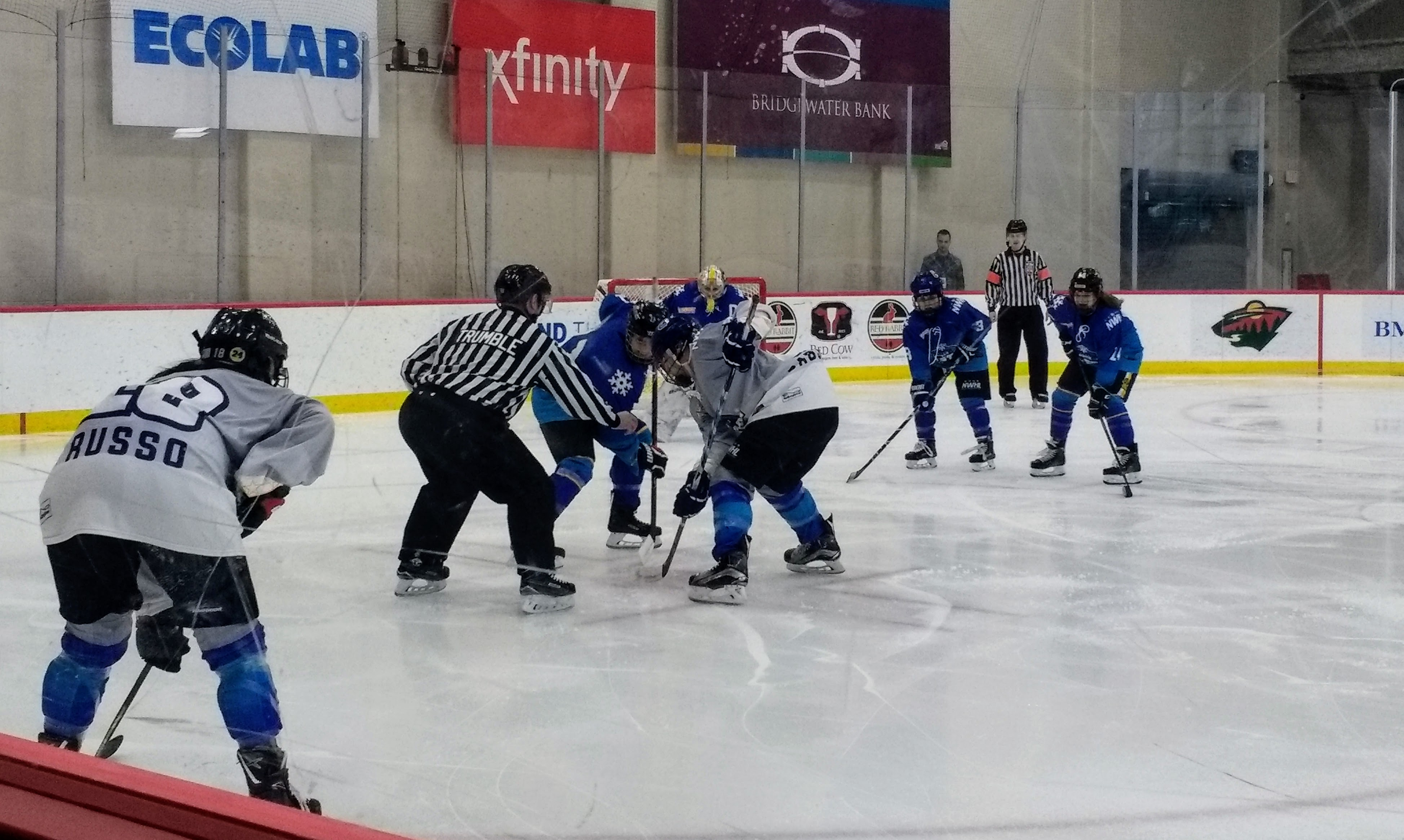
Two players take a faceoff during the NWHL All-Star Game at TRIA Rink

Brittany Ott of the Boston Pride and Amanda Leveille of the Buffalo Beauts served as team captains for the 3rd NWHL All-Star Game.

=== Standings ===
Final standings.

	GP	W	L	OTL	GF	GA	PTS
Metropolitan Riveters	16	13	3	0	64	30	26
Buffalo Beauts	16	12	4	0	51	41	24
Boston Pride	16	4	8	4	33	48	12
Connecticut Whale	16	3	11	2	26	55	8

== Playoffs ==
Semifinal game March 17–18
1	Metropolitan	5
4	Connecticut	0
2	Buffalo	3(OT)
3	Boston	2

Isobel Cup Championship; March 25
1	Metropolitan	1
2	Buffalo	0

== Awards and honors ==
- Alexa Gruschow, Metropolitan Riveters, 2018 NWHL Most Valuable Player
- Alexa Gruschow, Metropolitan Riveters, 2018 NWHL Scoring Champion
- Jillian Dempsey, Boston Pride, 2018 NWHL Denna Laing Perseverance Award
- Courtney Burke, Metropolitan Riveters, 2018 NWHL Defensive Player of the Year Award
- Amanda Leveille, Buffalo Beauts, 2018 NWHL Goaltender of the Year
- Hayley Scamurra, Buffalo Beauts, 2018 NWHL Rookie of the Year

=== Player of the Week ===
Day Awarded	Player	Team
October 30, 2017	Miye D'Oench	Metropolitan Riveters
November 6, 2017	Alexa Gruschow	Metropolitan Riveters
November 13, 2017	Taylor Accursi	Buffalo Beauts
November 20, 2017	Kelly Babstock	Connecticut Whale
December 4, 2017	Alyssa Gagliardi	Metropolitan Riveters
December 11, 2017	Kelly Nash	Metropolitan Riveters
December 18, 2017	Courtney Burke	Metropolitan Riveters
January 8, 2018	Kaylyn Schroka	Buffalo Beauts
January 22, 2018	Katie Fitzgerald	Metropolitan Riveters
January 29, 2018	Amanda Leveille; Brittany Ott	Buffalo Beauts; Boston Pride
February 5, 2018	Emily Fluke; Hayley Scamurra	Connecticut Whale; Buffalo Beauts
February 21, 2018	Maddie Elia	Buffalo Beauts
February 28, 2018	Emily Field; Kourtney Kunichika	Boston Pride; Buffalo Beauts
March 5, 2018	Dana Trivigno	Boston Pride
March 12, 2018	Sarah Edney; Madison Packer	Buffalo Beauts; Metropolitan Riveters

== Draft ==
The 2017 NWHL draft was the third in the history of the National Women's Hockey League and took place on August 17, 2017, in Brooklyn. Goaltender Katie Burt of Boston College was selected first overall by the Boston Pride. It marked the first time that the Boston Pride held the first pick overall in the draft, which the franchise obtained from the Connecticut Whale in the trade that sent Zoe Hickel to the Whale on February 7, 2017.

Rd	P	Player (Pos)	Team	Nationality	Former team
1	1	Katie Burt (G)	Boston Pride	United States	Boston College Eagles (Hockey East)
1	2	Kennedy Marchment (F)	Buffalo Beauts	Canada	St. Lawrence (ECAC)
1	3	Taylar Cianfrano (F)	New York Riveters	United States	Quinnipiac Bobcats (ECAC)
1	4	Kenzie Kent (F)	Boston Pride	United States	Boston College (HEA)
2	5	Sam Donovan (F)	Connecticut Whale	United States	Brown Bears (ECAC)
2	6	Savannah Harmon (D)	Buffalo Beauts	United States	Clarkson (ECAC)
2	7	Victoria Bach (F)	New York Riveters	Canada	Boston University (HEA)
2	8	Mallory Souliotis (D)	Boston Pride	United States	Yale (ECAC)
3	9	Eden Murray (F)	Connecticut Whale	Canada	Yale Bulldogs (ECAC)
3	10	Brittany Howard (F)	Buffalo Beauts	United States	Robert Morris (CHA)
3	11	McKenna Brand (F)	New York Riveters	United States	Northeastern Huskies (HEA)
3	12	Lexie Laing (F)	Boston Pride	United States	Harvard Crimson (ECAC)
4	13	Denisa Křížová (F)	Connecticut Whale	Czech Republic	Northeastern (HEA)
4	14	Annika Zalewski (F)	Buffalo Beauts	United States	Colgate Raiders (ECAC)
4	15	Toni Ann Miano (D)	New York Riveters	United States	Boston College (HEA)
4	16	Lauren Kelly (D)	Boston Pride	United States	Northeastern (HEA)
5	17	Nina Rodgers (F)	Connecticut Whale	United States	Boston University (HEA)
5	18	Amy Schlager (D)	Buffalo Beauts	United States	New Hampshire Wildcats (HEA)
5	19	Rebecca Leslie (F)	New York Riveters	Canada	Boston University (HEA)
5	20	Julia Fedeski (D)	Boston Pride	Canada	New Hampshire Wildcats (HEA)
