= Courtney Burke =

American ice hockey defenseman

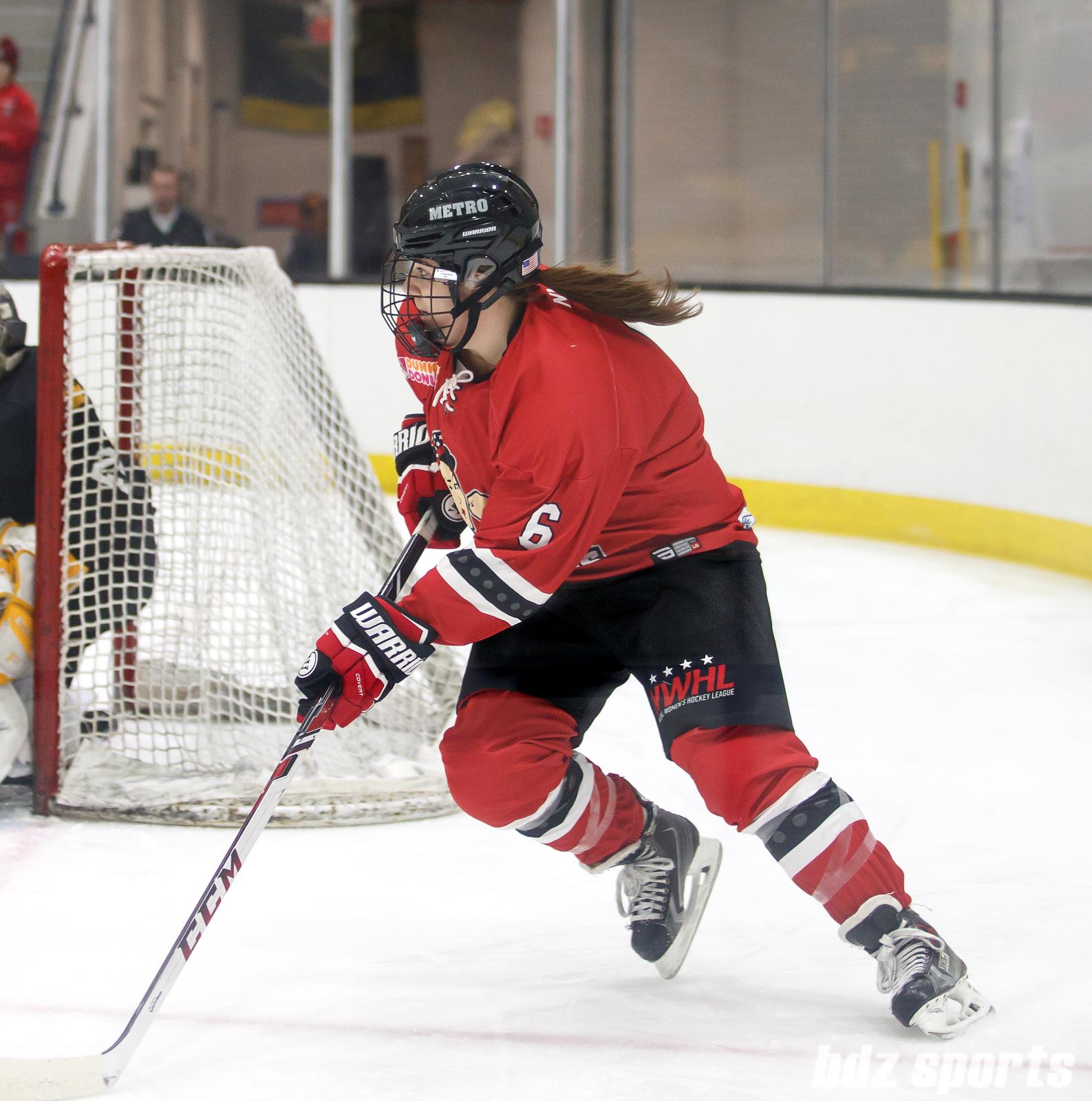
- Burke playing for the Metropolitan Riveters in 2018
- Born: September 2, 1994 (age 30); Albany, New York, U.S.
- Position: Defense
- Shoots: Left
- NWHL team: Metropolitan Riveters
- National team: United States
- Playing career: 2016–present

Courtney Burke (born September 2, 1994) is an American ice hockey defenseman. She was drafted fourth overall by the Buffalo Beauts during the 2015 NWHL Draft for the inaugural season of the National Women's Hockey League. In 2011, she helped the United States women's national under-18 ice hockey team win gold at the IIHF World Women's U18 Championships and silver at the 2012 tournament. She was part of the Metropolitan Riveters team that captured the Isobel Cup in 2018.

== Early life ==
Burke attended Shattuck-Saint Mary's in Faribault, Minnesota where she played in 147 games for the hockey team, recording 66 goals and 164 assists. The team won the U-19 Women's National Championship in the 2010–11 season. She committed to the University of Wisconsin at 17 years old, and debuted as a freshman in the 2012-13 regular season.

=== University of Wisconsin Badgers ===
During her freshman year at the University of Wisconsin, Burke appeared in all 35 games for the Wisconsin Badgers. She scored 4 goals and 19 assists, enough to lead all Wisconsin defensemen and freshmen in points. She was named to the All-WCHA Rookie team after that 2012–13 season. In her sophomore season, Burke scored 5 goals and 21 assists in 38 games and was named to the All-WCHA Second team. In her third year at Wisconsin, Burke scored 4 goals and 20 assists in 40 games.

== Playing career ==
=== Club ===
==== Buffalo Beauts ====
Burke was selected fourth overall by the Buffalo Beauts in the 2015 NWHL Draft while still a junior in college. She participated in the 3rd NWHL All-Star Game.

=== International ===
Burke helped the United States women's national under-18 ice hockey team capture gold at the 2011 IIHF World Women's U18 Championships in Stockholm, Sweden. The team won silver at the same tournament the following year, losing the rematch to Canada. After that tournament, Burke didn't compete internationally until 2015, when she played two games for the U.S. in the IIHF Under-22 Women's series.

== Awards and honors ==
- NWHL Player of the Week, Awarded December 18, 2017
