= 2016 Outdoor Women's Classic =

2016 Women's Winter Classic
| | 1 | 2 | Total |
|---|---|---|---|
| Les Canadiennes (CWHL) | 1 | 0 | 1 |
| Boston Pride (NWHL) | 0 | 1 | 1 |
- Date: December 31, 2015
- Venue: Gillette Stadium
- City: Foxborough, Massachusetts

The 2016 Outdoor Women's Classic presented by Scotiabank was an ice hockey game played on December 31, 2015, at Gillette Stadium in Foxborough, Massachusetts, between the Boston Pride of the National Women's Hockey League and Les Canadiennes of the Canadian Women's Hockey League. It was the first outdoor ice hockey game between professional women's teams; it ended in a 1–1 tie. The game was played one day before the 2016 NHL Winter Classic, between the Boston Bruins and Montreal Canadiens.

== Announcement ==
Publicity around the game was kept to a minimum after a report surfaced on December 5 that there would be a game between the two teams. On December 28, the game was officially announced, although players felt that it was overshadowed by other game-day events, including an NHL alumni game that followed the women's game.

== Game ==
The game was played in two 15-minute periods, with running time. Montreal's Kim Deschenes scored the first goal of the game at 3:15 of the first period, while Blake Bolden registered the game-tying goal for Boston late in the second period.

=== Injury ===
During the game, Pride player Denna Laing stepped on a stick and crashed into the boards head first. Removed from the ice on a stretcher, she was taken to the hospital. On January 8, 2016, Laing's family announced that she had suffered a severe spinal cord injury and that she had limited movement of her arms and no feeling in her legs.
