= Deering, New Hampshire =

- Town
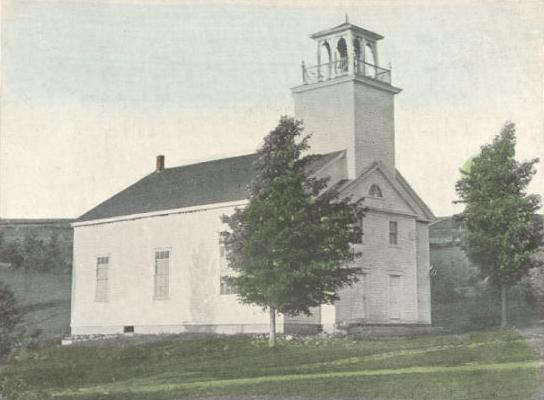
- Deering Community Church (built 1829) c. 1903

- Flag Seal

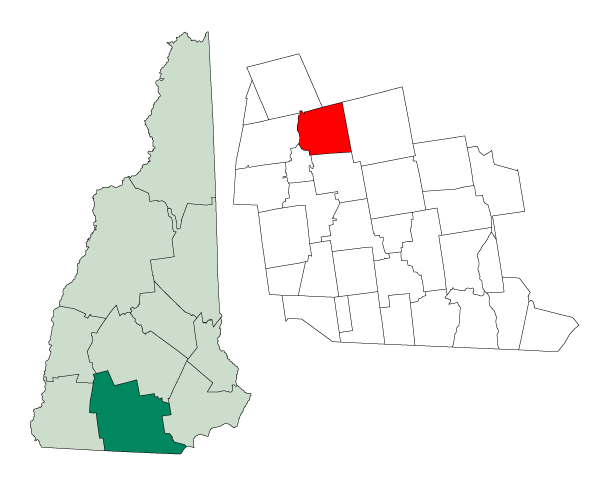
- Location in Hillsborough County, New Hampshire
- Coordinates: 43°04′28″N 71°52′24″W
- Country: United States
- State: New Hampshire
- County: Hillsborough
- Incorporated: 1774
- Villages: Deering; East Deering; West Deering; Holton

Area
  - Total: 31.2 sq mi (80.9 km^{2})
  - Land: 30.6 sq mi (79.2 km^{2})
  - Water: 0.66 sq mi (1.7 km^{2}) 2.05%
- Elevation: 988 ft (301 m)

Population (2020)
  - Total: 1,904
  - Density: 62/sq mi (24/km^{2})
- Time zone: UTC-5 (Eastern)
  - Summer (DST): UTC-4 (Eastern)
- ZIP code: 03244
- Area code: 603
- FIPS code: 33-17780
- GNIS feature ID: 873577
- Website: www.deering.nh.us

Deering is a town in Hillsborough County, New Hampshire, United States. The population was 1,904 at the 2020 census.

== History ==
First settled about 1765, the town was incorporated on 17 January 1774, by John Wentworth, governor of the Province of New Hampshire. He named it "Deering" after the maiden name of his wife, Frances Deering Wentworth, just as two years earlier he had bestowed Francestown with her first name. Deering had 928 residents when the first census was taken in 1790. By 1859, the population was 890. Its hills and valleys were well suited for agriculture. Industries included two sawmills, one gristmill, and one clothing factory.

== Geography ==
Deering is in northwestern Hillsborough County, bordered by Hillsborough and Henniker to the north, Weare to the east, Francestown to the south, Bennington to the southwest, and Antrim to the west. According to the United States Census Bureau, the town has a total area of 31.2 square miles (80.9 km^{2}), of which 30.6 square miles (79.2 km^{2}) are land and 0.66 square miles (1.7 km^{2}) are water, comprising 2.05% of the town. The highest point in Deering is Clark Summit, just west of the center of town, at 1,570 feet (480 m) above sea level. Deering lies fully within the Merrimack River watershed. The eastern two-thirds of the town are drained by tributaries of the Piscataquog River, which flows east to join the Merrimack in Manchester, while the western third of the town drains to the Contoocook River, which forms the western boundary of the town and flows north to the Merrimack in Penacook.

The town is crossed by State Route 149, connecting Hillsborough to the north with Weare to the east.

=== Adjacent municipalities ===
- Henniker (north)
- Weare (east)
- Francestown (south)
- Bennington (southwest)
- Antrim (west)
- Hillsborough (northwest)

== Demographics ==
Historical population
Census	Pop.	Note	%±
1790	928		—
1800	1,244		34.1%
1810	1,363		9.6%
1820	1,415		3.8%
1830	1,227		−13.3%
1840	1,124		−8.4%
1850	890		−20.8%
1860	793		−10.9%
1870	722		−9.0%
1880	674		−6.6%
1890	531		−21.2%
1900	486		−8.5%
1910	353		−27.4%
1920	287		−18.7%
1930	324		12.9%
1940	367		13.3%
1950	392		6.8%
1960	345		−12.0%
1970	578		67.5%
1980	1,041		80.1%
1990	1,707		64.0%
2000	1,875		9.8%
2010	1,912		2.0%
2020	1,904		−0.4%
2024 (est.)	1,922		0.9%
U.S. Decennial Census

As of the census of 2010, there were 1,912 people, 740 households, and 534 families residing in the town. The population density was 62.1 inhabitants per square mile (24.0/km^{2}). There were 932 housing units at an average density of 30.3 per square mile (11.7/km^{2}). The racial makeup of the town was 97.0% White, 0.3% African American, 0.2% Native American or Alaska Native, 0.1% some other race, and 1.5% from two or more races. Hispanic or Latino of any race were 1.3% of the population.

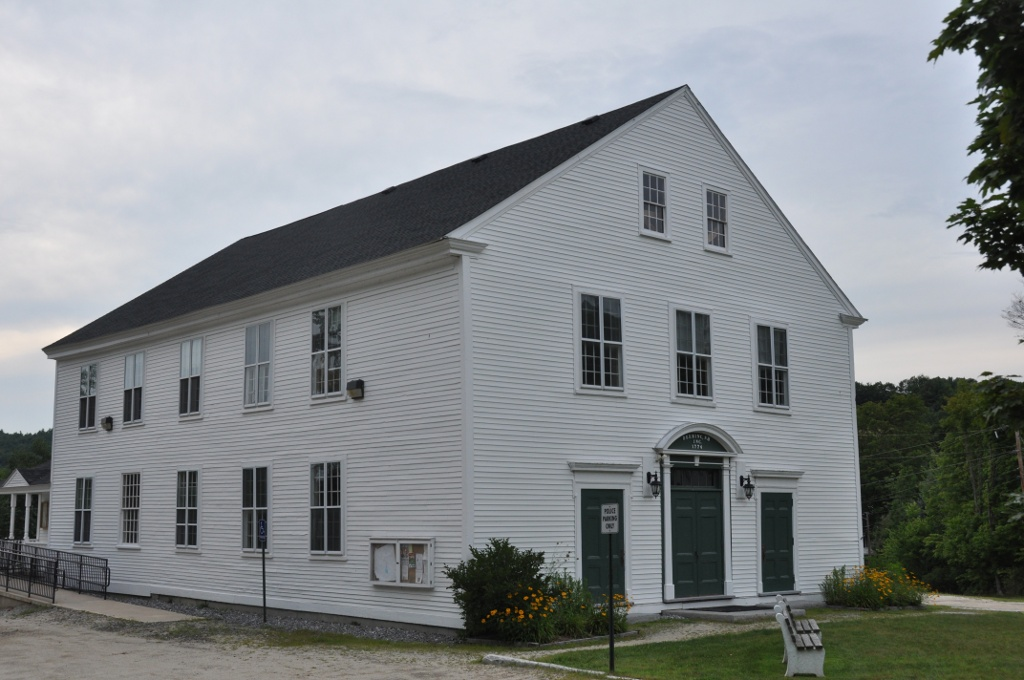
Town Hall

There were 740 households, out of which 28.4% had children under the age of 18 living with them, 58.9% were headed by married couples living together, 7.3% had a female householder with no husband present, and 27.8% were non-families. 20.1% of all households were made up of individuals, and 6.2% were someone living alone who was 65 years of age or older. The average household size was 2.49, and the average family size was 2.85.

In the town, the population was spread out, with 19.4% under the age of 18, 7.2% from 18 to 24, 26.7% from 25 to 44, 33.2% from 45 to 64, and 13.5% who were 65 years of age or older. The median age was 42.9 years. For every 100 females, there were 107.4 males. For every 100 females age 18 and over, there were 105.1 males.

For the period 2009–2013, the estimated median annual income for a household in the town was $68,281, and the median income for a family was $76,389. Male full-time workers had a median income of $60,114 versus $40,272 for females. The per capita income for the town was $33,042. About 5.4% of families and 9.6% of the population were below the poverty line.

== Notable people ==
- James W. Grimes (1816–1872), US senator, third governor of Iowa
- Lotte Jacobi (1896–1990), photographer; lived in Deering from 1955 until her death in 1990
- Jenna Rheault (born 1996), professional ice hockey defender with Boston Pride
- Jon Rheault (born 1986), professional ice hockey forward with Adler Mannheim
- Tom Rush (born 1941), folk singer; lived in Deering (1971–1990)
