= 3rd NWHL All-Star Game =

	1	3	Total
Team Ott	x	x	8
Team Leveille	x	x	6
- Date: February 11, 2018
- Arena: TRIA Rink
- City: Saint Paul, MN, United States
- MVP: Kelsey Koelzer; Hayley Scamurra
- Attendance: 5,024

The 3rd NWHL All-Star Game took place on February 11, 2018 at TRIA Rink in Saint Paul, Minnesota. A skills competition was held the day prior on February 10, 2018.

Brittany Ott of the Boston Pride and Amanda Leveille of the Buffalo Beauts served as All-Star captains. Of note, Leveille became the first Canadian-born player to serve as a captain in the NWHL All-Star Game. The coaches for the event were Minnesota Whitecaps legend Winny Brodt for Team Leveille, while Winter Games gold medalist Tricia Dunn served in the same capacity with Team Ott.

The game was contested in two 25-minute periods. With the contest held in Minnesota, each team featured one member of the Minnesota Whitecaps on its roster. Kate Schipper skated for Team Leveille while Sadie Lundquist competed with Team Ott. Katie Million, the Commissioner of the Western Collegiate Hockey Association was also in attendance. The officials selected for both the 2018 NWHL Skills Competition and 2018 NWHL All-Star Game were referee Jordan Kraabel, linesmen Mike Trumble and linesmen Ian Schachte.

== Rosters ==
Team Leveille
Player	Team	Pos.	Nat.	Appearance
Amanda Leveille	Buffalo Beauts	Goaltender	(Canada)	1
Katie Fitzgerald	Metropolitan Riveters	Goaltender	(United States)	2
Sarah Edney	Buffalo Beauts	Defense	(Canada)	1
Lexi Bender	Boston Pride	Defense	(United States)	1
Lisa Chesson	Buffalo Beauts	Defense	(United States)	1
Jordyn Burns	Buffalo Beauts	Defense	(United States)	1
Kelsey Koelzer	Metropolitan Riveters	Defense	(United States)	1
Kate Schipper	Minnesota Whitecaps	Forward	(United States)	1
Kelly Babstock	Connecticut Whale	Forward	(Canada)	2
Rebecca Russo	Metropolitan Riveters	Forward	(United States)	2
Rebecca Vint	Buffalo Beauts	Forward	(Canada)	1
Kristin Lewicki	Buffalo Beauts	Forward	(United States)	1
Sam Faber	Connecticut Whale	Forward	(United States)	1
Meagan Mangene	Boston Pride	Forward	(United States)	1

Team Ott
Player	Team	Pos.	Nat.	
Brittany Ott	Boston Pride	Goaltender	(United States)	3
Sydney Rossman	Connecticut Whale	Goaltender	(United States)	1
Alyssa Gagliardi	Boston Pride	Defense	(United States)	2
Amanda Boulier	Connecticut Whale	Defense	(United States)	1
Jenny Ryan	Metropolitan Riveters	Defense	(United States)	1
Courtney Burke	Metropolitan Riveters	Defense	(United States)	2
Michelle Picard	Metropolitan Riveters	Defense	(United States)	1
Alexa Gruschow	Metropolitan Riveters	Forward	(United States)	1
Jordan Smelker	Boston Pride	Forward	(United States)	1
Jillian Dempsey	Boston Pride	Forward	(United States)	1
Hayley Scamurra	Buffalo Beauts	Forward	(United States)	1
Emily Field	Boston Pride	Forward	(United States)	2
Sadie Lundquist	Minnesota Whitecaps	Forward	(United States)	1
Corinne Buie	Buffalo Beauts	Forward	(United States)	2

== Game recap ==
Hayley Scamurra logged a hat trick and an assist as Team Ott emerged victorious in an 8–6 final. Team Leveille member Kelsey Koelzer set an All-Star Game record by scoring four goals. Of note, both Koezler and Scamurra were making their All-Star debuts. Other scorers for Team Ott included Alexa Gruschow, Corinne Buie, Jordan Smelker and Amanda Boulier. Of note, Smelker and Boulier both logged assists in the game. Team Ott out-shot Team Leveille, 41–28.

== Skills challenge ==
In the Skills Challenge, Team Leveille defeated Team Ott by a 4–3 tally. The winner was decided in a skate-off between the two captains.

- Fastest Skater: Kristin Lewicki, Team Leveille, 13.41
- Hardest Shot: Kelsey Koelzer, Team Leveille, 81 mph
- Dunkin Donuts Shooting Accuracy: Corinne Buie, Team Ott, 12.6 seconds
- Fastest Goalie Challenge: Team Leveille (Amanda Leveille and Katie Fitzgerald) won the Fastest Goalie challenge, Team Ott won the Howie’s Hockey
- Breakaway contest: Team Ott (participants included Courtney Burke, Sadie Lundquist and Jenny Ryan)
