= Bob Jay =

American ice hockey player (born 1965)

- Born: November 18, 1965 (age 60) Burlington, Massachusetts, U.S.
- Height: 5 ft 11 in (180 cm)
- Weight: 185 lb (84 kg; 13 st 3 lb)
- Position: Defense
- Shot: Right
- Played for: Los Angeles Kings
- NHL draft: Undrafted
- Playing career: 1993–2002

Robert Gould Jay (born November 18, 1965) is an American former professional ice hockey player and coach. He appeared in three games for the Los Angeles Kings in the National Hockey League (NHL) during the 1993–94 season, and played nine seasons in the International Hockey League (IHL) between 1990 and 1999.

After his playing career ended, Jay turned to coaching, most notably as an assistant to Ted Donato at Harvard University from 2004 to 2007 and again from 2009 to 2011. He has been an assistant coach for the United States women's national ice hockey team through several campaigns including the Sochi Olympics where the team won a silver medal. Jay was also head coach for the Boston Pride of the National Women's Hockey League from 2015 to 2017.

== Career statistics ==
=== Regular season and playoffs ===
			Regular season					Playoffs
Season	Team	League	GP	G	A	Pts	PIM	GP	G	A	Pts	PIM
1984–85	Merrimack College	ECAC 2	23	3	5	8	20	—	—	—	—	—
1985–86	Merrimack College	ECAC 2	30	6	18	24	33	—	—	—	—	—
1986–87	Merrimack College	ECAC 2	36	4	21	25	42	—	—	—	—	—
1987–88	Merrimack College	ECAC 2	27	4	19	23	20	—	—	—	—	—
1988–89	Halmstad HK	SWE-4	—	—	—	—	—	—	—	—	—	—
1990–91	Fort Wayne Komets	IHL	40	1	8	9	24	14	0	3	3	16
1991–92	Fort Wayne Komets	IHL	76	1	19	20	119	7	0	2	2	4
1992–93	Fort Wayne Komets	IHL	78	5	21	26	100	8	0	2	2	14
1993–94	Los Angeles Kings	NHL	3	0	1	1	0	—	—	—	—	—
1993–94	Phoenix Roadrunners	IHL	65	7	15	22	54	—	—	—	—	—
1994–95	Detroit Vipers	IHL	57	3	8	11	51	5	0	0	0	10
1995–96	Detroit Vipers	IHL	17	2	2	4	22	6	0	1	1	16
1996–97	Detroit Vipers	IHL	71	3	11	14	44	21	1	1	2	21
1997–98	Detroit Vipers	IHL	66	5	12	17	88	8	1	3	4	8
1998–99	Detroit Vipers	IHL	44	1	3	4	51	—	—	—	—	—
2001–02	Manchester Monarchs	AHL	4	0	0	0	0	—	—	—	—	—
IHL totals			514	28	99	127	553	69	2	12	14	89
NHL totals			3	0	1	1	0	—	—	—	—	—
