= Denna Laing =

American ice hockey player (born 1991)

- Born: May 12, 1991 (age 35) Marblehead, Massachusetts, U.S.
- Height: 5 ft 9 in (175 cm)
- Weight: 154 lb (70 kg; 11 st 0 lb)
- Position: Forward
- Shot: Right
- Played for: NWHL; Boston Pride; CWHL; Boston Blades; NCAA (Div 1); Princeton University
- Playing career: 2010–2016
- Website: www.dennalaing.org

Denna Christine Laing (born May 12, 1991) is an American former professional ice hockey player. She last played for the Boston Pride of the National Women's Hockey League (NWHL) until a career-ending injury. At the collegiate level, she accumulated 77 points while competing for the Princeton Tigers women's ice hockey program from 2010 to 2014. She was also the captain her junior and senior year.

== Playing career ==
=== CWHL ===
Selected in the 8th round of the 2014 CWHL Draft, Laing played for the Boston Blades of the Canadian Women's Hockey League (CWHL) during the 2014–15 season, accumulating two points in 18 games played. She competed in all postseason games and helped the Blades capture the 2015 Clarkson Cup.

=== NWHL ===
In 2015, Laing signed with the Boston Pride of the new NWHL professional league. On December 31, 2015, Laing participated in the 2016 Outdoor Women's Classic, the first outdoor professional women's hockey game. During the first period, Laing went into the boards head first. Removed from the ice on a stretcher, she was taken to the hospital. On January 8, 2016, Laing's family announced that she had had a severe spinal cord injury and that she had limited movement of her arms and no feeling in her legs.

== Post-playing career ==
Laing competed in the 2017 Boston Marathon, being pushed in a special racing wheelchair by fellow Massachusite and former NHL star Bobby Carpenter. The pair finished the race with a time of 4:32:30.

== Awards ==
ECAC

- All-Academic Team (2013)
- Second Team All-Ivy (2014)

Princeton Team Awards

- Rookie of the Year (2011)

NWHL

- NWHL Foundation Award (2016)
- NWHL Perseverance Award (2016)

== Statistics ==
			Regular Season					Playoffs
Season	Team	League	GP	G	A	Pts	PIM	GP	G	A	Pts	PIM
2010–11	Princeton University	NCAA	31	8	10	18	30	—	—	—	—	—
2011–12	Princeton University	NCAA	31	11	11	22	40	—	—	—	—	—
2012–13	Princeton University	NCAA	27	3	7	10	12	—	—	—	—	—
2013–14	Princeton University	NCAA	31	13	14	27	12	—	—	—	—	—
2014–15	Boston Blades	CWHL	18	1	1	2	0	7	0	0	0	0
2015–16	Boston Pride	NWHL	2	0	0	0	0	—	—	—	—	—
NCAA Totals			120	35	42	77	94	—	—	—	—	—

== See also ==
- Travis Roy
