= Boston Pride =

Former women's professional ice hockey team in Boston

- City: Boston, Massachusetts
- League: Premier Hockey Federation
- Founded: 2015
- Folded: 2023
- Home arena: Warrior Ice Arena
- Colors: Black, gold, white
- Owner: Miles Arnone
- General manager: Maddie Rigsby
- Head coach: Paul Mara
- Captain: Jillian Dempsey
- Affiliates: Boston Bruins (NHL)
- Website: Official website

Championships
- Regular season titles: 3 (2015–16, 2016–17, 2019–20)
- Playoff championships: 3 (2016, 2021, 2022)

The Boston Pride were a professional ice hockey team based in Boston. It was one of the four charter franchises of the Premier Hockey Federation (PHF). The Pride played at Warrior Ice Arena, which is also the practice facility for the Boston Bruins of the National Hockey League. The Pride won the inaugural Isobel Cup in 2016 and became the first professional women's ice hockey team to win three championship titles when they claimed consecutive victories in 2021 and 2022.

The team folded at the end of the 2023 season, when the PHF's assets were purchased and the league dissolved as part of the process of creating a new, unified, women's professional league.

== History ==
=== First seasons ===
The Pride was announced as one of the four founding teams in the National Women's Hockey League (NWHL), the first women's hockey league in North America to pay its players a salary, to begin play in the 2015–16 season. In May 2015, the Pride announced the hiring of Bobby Jay as their head coach. Jay was previously an assistant coach for the silver medal-winning 2014 U.S. Women's Olympic Team, and on the coaching staff of the U.S. Women's National Team at the IIHF Women's World Championships in 2012 and 2013, and the Four Nations Cup in 2011, 2012, and 2013. The team announced its inaugural season would play home games at the Bright-Landry Hockey Center at Harvard University in the Allston neighborhood of Boston. In June 2015, Amanda Pelkey became the first player to sign a player contract with the Pride.

The team played their first game with a 4–1 victory over the Buffalo Beauts. Hilary Knight scored the first goal in franchise history and would also record the first multi-goal game in NWHL history. The Pride's first win was recorded by Brittany Ott, simultaneously becoming the first American-born goaltender to win an NWHL regular season game. During a 5–3 road win against the Buffalo Beauts, Brianna Decker scored the first hat-trick in NWHL history. In November 2015, Briana Decker and Hilary Knight were named co-captains of the Pride.

On December 31, 2015, the Boston Pride played the Les Canadiennes de Montréal of the Canadian Women's Hockey League (CWHL) to a 1–1 tie in the 2016 Outdoor Women's Classic at Gillette Stadium in Foxborough, Massachusetts, which took place the day before the 2016 NHL Winter Classic. It was the first outdoor professional women's hockey, the first women's game sanctioned by the NHL, and the only game ever played between NWHL and CWHL team. In the second period of the game, Denna Laing crashed into the boards and suffered a career ending injury. A rally of support resulted in funds raised for the Denna Laing Foundation. At the end of the season, Laing was awarded the NWHL's Foundation Award and the Perseverance Award, which was later named after her.

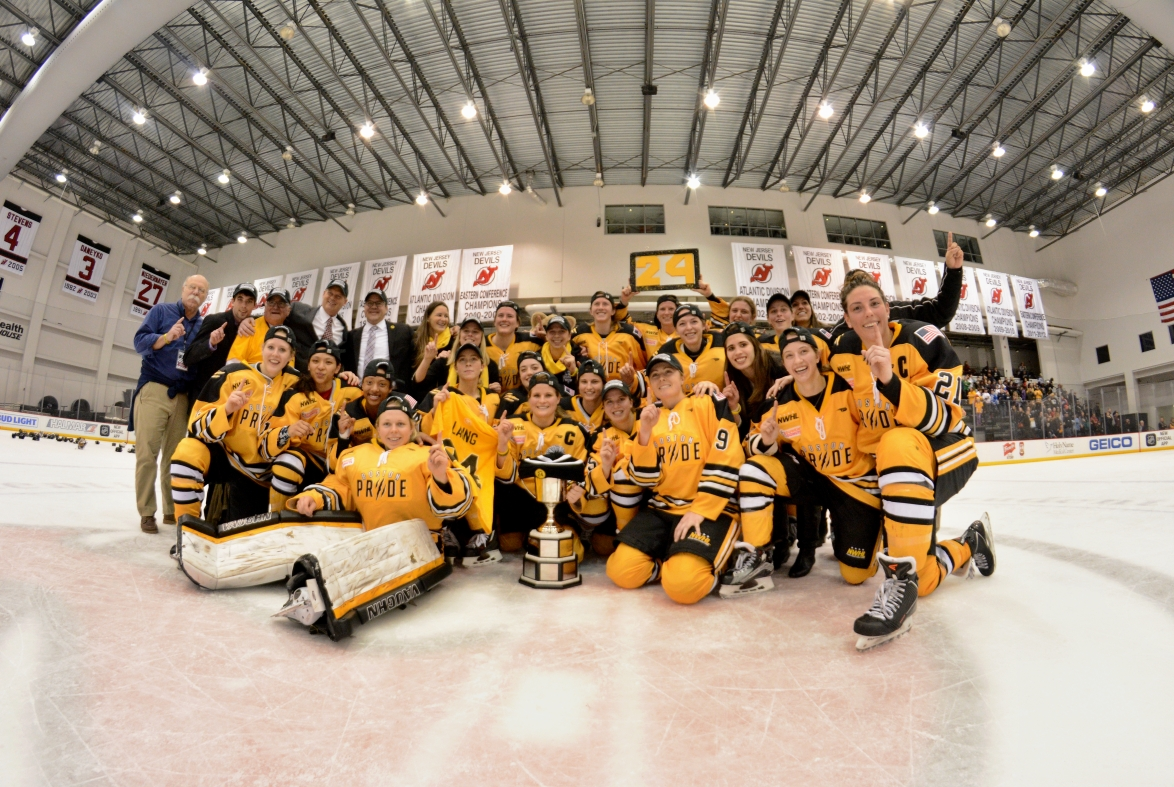
The Boston Pride celebrating their first Isobel Cup win in 2016.

The Pride finished the league's inaugural season with the best record, earning the top seed in the Isobel Cup playoffs. The team then swept both the semifinals and finals over the New York Riveters and Buffalo Beauts, respectively. Decker was named the season's Most Valuable Player and Knight was the top scorer.

For their second season, the team moved their home games to Warrior Ice Arena, the practice arena of the NHL's Boston Bruins, in the Boston neighborhood of Brighton. On April 28, 2016, the Pride acquired the rights to Alex Carpenter, the first overall pick in the 2015 NWHL Draft, from the New York Riveters for rights to Miye D'Oench, the Pride's 2015 fourth round pick. On February 2, 2017, the team traded Zoe Hickel to Connecticut Whale for their first pick in the 2017 NWHL Draft. The Pride led the league by a large margin, earning a 16–1–0 record over 17 games. The Pride then lost to the Buffalo Beauts in the Isobel Cup final. Decker was named the NWHL's Most Valuable Player for the second consecutive season and also led the league in scoring.

=== Team turnover ===
The team had several personnel changes prior to the 2017–18 season, including a new head coach in Thomas Pöck, and lost seven players for the season in preparation for their participation in the 2018 Winter Olympics, including Carpenter, Decker, and Knight. Additionally, many of the NWHL's players opted to play in the CWHL, as the league had begun offering player stipends and the NWHL had made an up-to-50% cut to player pay during the previous season. Jillian Dempsey was then named the next team captain. After two seasons, in which the Pride finished regular season in first place, played in the Isobel Cup finals, the Pride finished in third place. The Pride ultimately lost to the Buffalo Beauts in the first round semifinal game and failed to make the Isobel Cup finals for the first time.

On May 30, 2018, Paul Mara was named head coach for the 2018–19 season and inaugural Pride member Marissa Gedman retired from playing to join the staff as an assistant coach. The Pride again finished third during the regular season and lost in the semifinal game to Buffalo. Johnny McInnis was hired as an assistant coach for the Pride in the 2020–21 season.

=== Under independent ownership ===
In September 2019, the league announced the Boston Pride had been purchased by a group of investors led by Miles Arnone. On January 26, 2020, Dempsey became the first player in league history to reach 100 career points, including playoffs. She reached the century mark with an assist in a win versus the Minnesota Whitecaps. The Pride won their third regular season title with a 23–1–0 record and qualified for the 2020 Isobel Cup final against the defending champion Minnesota Whitecaps. However, the championship was initially postponed and then cancelled as the COVID-19 pandemic escalated causing limitations for social distancing and traveling. Dempsey was league's the top scorer and was named the NWHL's co-Most Valuable Player with Allie Thunstrom of Minnesota. In September 2020, Logan International Airport unveiled a pair of championship banners for the Pride's 2016 Isobel Cup win and their 2019–20 regular season first-place finish. The Pride became the first women's sports team from Boston to have their banners hung in the airport, alongside the already-present men's Boston Bruins, Boston Celtics, New England Patriots, and Boston Red Sox.

Owing to the ongoing COVID-19 pandemic, the NWHL announced a two-week, single-site season to be played at Herb Brooks Arena in Lake Placid, New York, from January 23 to February 5, 2021. The Riveters were forced to withdraw early due to too many positive cases of COVID-19, leading to a schedule alteration with the Pride and the Beauts playing each other in a three-game series to determine the fourth seed, which the Pride won. The single-site season was curtailed prior to the playoffs due to an excessive outbreak of COVID-19 among all teams and personnel in Lake Placid. The postseason was rescheduled for March 26 and 27 at the Pride's home arena in Brighton. The Pride then defeated the top seeded Toronto Six before winning their second Isobel Cup by defeating the Minnesota Whitecaps 4–3 in the championship game.

On March 10, 2022, the Pride and PHF announced that Willie O'Ree had joined the team's ownership group.

The Pride finished the 2021–22 season as the #3 seed in the playoffs. Boston outscored the Buffalo Beauts and Toronto Six by a combined 11–1 margin en route to the Championship game against the Connecticut Whale. On March 28, 2022, the Pride repeated as PHF champions beating the Whale 3–2. Taylor Wenczkowski scored the Isobel Cup-winning goal for the second year in a row and was named MVP of the Isobel Cup playoffs.

=== End of the PHF ===
In the summer of 2023, the PHF's assets were purchased as part of a bid to create a new, unified women's professional league. This led the PHF and its teams to fold, and resulted in the foundation of the Professional Women's Hockey League (PWHL). In August, it was announced that Boston had been awarded one of the six charter PWHL franchises. PWHL Boston made its debut on January 3, 2024.

== Season-by-season records ==
Note: GP = Games played, W = Wins, L = Losses, T = Ties, OTL = Overtime losses, SOL = Shootout losses, Pts = Points, GF = Goals for, GA = Goals against

Season	GP	W	L	T	OTL	SOL	Pts	GF	GA	Playoffs
2015–16	18	14	3	0	1	0	29	75	39	Won Isobel Cup Championship over Buffalo Beauts
2016–17	17	16	1	0	0	0	32	73	29	Lost Isobel Cup Championship to Buffalo Beauts
2017–18	16	4	8	—	4	—	12	33	48	Lost semifinal game to Buffalo Beauts
2018–19	16	11	5	—	0	0	22	60	36	Lost semifinal game to Buffalo Beauts
2019–20	24	23	1	—	0	0	46	120	43	Qualified for Isobel Cup Championship vs. Minnesota Whitecaps; Championship cancelled due to COVID-19 pandemic
2020–21	7	3	4	—	0	0	6	22	11	Won Isobel Cup Championship over Minnesota Whitecaps
2021–22	20	10	5	—	5	0	32	48	47	Won Isobel Cup Championship over Connecticut Whale
2022–23	24	19	4	—	5	0	54	92	52	Lost semifinal round to Minnesota Whitecaps
Totals	142	100	31	0	9	0	233	523	305	

Note: In the 2021–22 season, the NWHL rebranded as the Premier Hockey Federation (PHF) and used a new points system for league standings in which regulation wins counted for 3 points. Overtime wins still counted as 2 points and overtime losses remained worth 1 point, as in prior seasons.

== Media ==
In November 2015, it was announced that all Pride home games would be broadcast live on NESN. During the 2019–20 and 2020-2021 season, all NWHL games were broadcast live on Twitch. Starting in the 2021–22 season, all PHF games were broadcast on ESPN+ in the United States and TSN in Canada.

== Team ==
=== 2022–23 roster ===
As of February 28, 2023

No.	Nat	Player	Pos	S/G	Age	Acquired	Birthplace
–	(Canada)	Chloe Gonsalves	D	L	26	2023	Toronto, Ontario
3	(United States)	Olivia Zafuto	D	L	29	2022	Niagara Falls, New York
4	(United States)	Lauren Kelly	D	L	30	2018	Watertown, Massachusetts
6	(United States)	Kali Flanagan	D	R	30	2021	Burlington, Massachusetts
7	(United States)	Taylor Turnquist	D	R	28	2022	Blaine, Minnesota
8	(Canada)	Élizabeth Giguère	F	R	29	2022	Quebec City, Quebec
9	(United States)	Allie Thunstrom	F	R	38	2022	Maplewood, Minnesota
10	(United States)	Taylor House	F	L	27	2022	Joliet, Illinois
12	(United States)	Jenna Rheault	D	R	30	2019	Deering, New Hampshire
13	(Canada)	Kaleigh Fratkin (A)	D	R	34	2017	Burnaby, British Columbia
14	(United States)	Jillian Dempsey (C)	F	L	35	2015	Winthrop, Massachusetts
15	(United States)	Becca Gilmore	F	R	28	2022	Wayland, Massachusetts
17	(United States)	McKenna Brand (A)	F	L	30	2018	Park Rapids, Minnesota
18	(United States)	Taylor Wenczkowski	F	R	28	2020	Rochester, New Hampshire
19	(United States)	Sammy Davis	F	L	28	2020	Pembroke, Massachusetts
21	(Canada)	Christina Putigna	F	L	28	2019	Grimsby, Ontario
29	(Canada)	Kayla Friesen	F	L	28	2021	Winnipeg, Manitoba
30	(Canada)	Corinne Schroeder	G	L	26	2022	Elm Creek, Manitoba
35	(Sweden)	Lovisa Selander	G	L	31	2019	Sollentuna, Sweden
36	(Canada)	Loren Gabel	F	L	29	2022	Kitchener, Ontario
37	(Czech Republic)	Aneta Tejralová	D	L	30	2022	Prague, Czechia
42	(United States)	Meghara McManus	F	R	28	2020	Milton, Massachusetts

Coaching staff and team personnel

- Head coach: Paul Mara
- Assistant coach: Marissa Gedman
- Assistant coach: Courtney Sheary
- Athletic trainer: Jerry Foster
- Equipment manager: Dave Souza

=== Team captains ===
- Brianna Decker & Hilary Knight, 2015–2017
- Jillian Dempsey, 2018–2023

=== Head coaches ===
- Bobby Jay, 2015–2017
- Thomas Pöck, 2017–18
- Paul Mara, 2018–2023

=== General managers ===
- Hayley Moore, 2015–2017
- Karilyn Pilch, 2019–2021
- Danielle Larouco née Solari, 2021–22
- Maddie Rigsby, 2022–2023

=== Team Presidents ===
- Hayley Moore, 2017–2021
- Colleen Coyne, 2021–2023

== Draft history ==
=== 2015 NWHL draft ===
The following were the Pride's selections from the 2015 NWHL Draft of college ice hockey players in their junior year, held on June 20, 2015, in Boston. Drafted players who did not sign with the organization that selected them could enter free-agency after completing their senior year.

Kendall Coyne of the Northeastern Huskies women's ice hockey program was the first player ever drafted by the Boston Pride, selected in the first round, third overall in 2015.

Pick	Nat	Player	Pos.	College	Program
3	(United States)	Kendall Coyne	F	Northeastern University	Huskies
7	(Canada)	Emerance Maschmeyer	G	Harvard University	Crimson
11	(United States)	Lexi Bender	D	Boston College	Eagles
15	(United States)	Miye D’Oench	F	Harvard University	Crimson
19	(Canada)	Shannon MacAuley	F	Clarkson University	Golden Knights

== Awards and honors ==
=== PHF/NWHL Awards ===
Most Valuable Player

- 2016 – Brianna Decker
- 2017 – Brianna Decker
- 2020 – Jillian Dempsey (co-MVP with Allie Thunstrom of the Minnesota Whitecaps)

Goaltender of the Year

- 2016 – Brittany Ott
- 2020 – Lovisa Selander

Defender of the Year

- 2016 – Gigi Marvin
- 2020 – Kaleigh Fratkin
- 2021 – Kaleigh Fratkin

Scoring Champion

- 2016 – Hilary Knight
- 2017 – Brianna Decker
- 2020 – Jillian Dempsey

Playoff MVP

- 2022 – Taylor Wenczkowski

Denna Liang Award

- 2016 – Denna Laing (called the 2016 Perseverance Award)
- 2018 – Jillian Dempsey
- 2019 – Jillian Dempsey

Foundation Award

- 2016 – Denna Laing
- 2017 – Alyssa Gagliardi
- 2018 – Lexi Bender
- 2019 – Mallory Souliotis
- 2020 – Lexi Bender
- 2021 – Mallory Souliotis
- 2022 – Jenna Rheault

=== Other ===
Fans' Three Stars of the Season

- 2021 – Mallory Souliotis

== Franchise milestones ==
Milestone	Player	Date
First goal	Hilary Knight	October 11, 2015
First hat trick	Brianna Decker	October 25, 2015
First multi-point game	Hilary Knight	October 11, 2015
First win	Brittany Ott	October 11, 2015
First African-American player	Blake Bolden	October 11, 2015
First playoff goal	Brianna Decker	March 4, 2016
First playoff game-winning goal	Brianna Decker	March 4, 2016
First playoff win	Brittany Ott	March 4, 2016
First playoff shutout	Brittany Ott	March 4, 2016
