= Metropolitan Riveters =

Former women's professional ice hockey team in East Rutherford, New Jersey

- City: East Rutherford, New Jersey
- League: Premier Hockey Federation
- Founded: 2015
- Folded: 2023
- Home arena: The Rink at American Dream
- Colors: Blue, red, white
- Owners: BTM Partners (John Boynton, chairman)
- General manager: Tori Charron
- Head coach: Venla Hovi
- Captain: Madison Packer

Franchise history
- 2015–2017: New York Riveters
- 2017–2023: Metropolitan Riveters

Championships
- Regular season titles: 1 (2017–18)
- Playoff championships: 1 (2017–18)

The Metropolitan Riveters (originally the New York Riveters) were a professional ice hockey team based in East Rutherford, New Jersey, with home games at the American Dream Meadowlands ice rink.

They were one of the four charter franchises of the National Women's Hockey League (NWHL), later known as the Premier Hockey Federation (PHF). Its team name and logo were based upon Rosie the Riveter, the subject of the World War II-era motivational poster "We Can Do It!". The Riveters played one season in Brooklyn before moving to the New Jersey Devils practice rink in Newark, New Jersey, in 2016. The team then formed a promotional affiliation with the Devils and were renamed the Metropolitan Riveters; the partnership ended in 2019. The team folded in 2023, when the PHF's assets were purchased and the league dissolved.

== History ==
The first player signed to a contract was Janine Weber, who also became the first player in the history of the NWHL to be signed to a contract. With the first pick overall in the 2015 NWHL Draft, the Riveters selected Alex Carpenter, a medalist from the 2014 Sochi Winter Games. The team made its debut in 2015 playing at Aviator Sports & Events Center in Brooklyn, New York. The first player to ever score a goal for the Riveters was Brooke Ammerman. The New York Riveters won their first game against the Boston Pride on November 15, 2015. Nana Fujimoto became the first New York Riveters goaltender to earn a win in the NWHL and the first Japanese born goaltender to win a NWHL game. Meghan Fardelmann became the first Riveter to record a hat trick.

On May 1, 2016, the Riveters signed free agent Amanda Kessel to a one-year deal worth $26,000, making her the highest paid player in the league. At the 2016 NWHL Draft, held in Brooklyn, the Riveters held the first overall pick for the second consecutive year and selected Kelsey Koelzer from the Princeton Tigers women's ice hockey program.

On August 1, 2016, it was announced that the Riveters would move from Brooklyn to Barnabas Health Hockey House at the Prudential Center in Newark, New Jersey.

Prior to their second season in New Jersey, the Riveters announced they had partnered with the New Jersey Devils of the National Hockey League (NHL), becoming the first NWHL team to officially partner with an NHL team. Upon the announcement, the Riveters changed their name to the Metropolitan Riveters to reflect the broader geographic region. The Riveters also adopted the colors of the Devils and changed their jerseys. As part of the new affiliation, the Riveters and Devils held a doubleheader for the Riveters' 2017–18 season opener against the Boston Pride followed by the Devils' game against the Arizona Coyotes at the Prudential Center. In the 2017–18 season, the Riveters won both the regular season and the Isobel Cup against the previous champions, the Buffalo Beauts.

At the end of their 2017–18 championship season, original head coach Chad Wiseman resigned, taking a job closer to home as an assistant with the Guelph Storm, and was replaced by Randy Velischek.

In March 2019, it was announced that the professional level Canadian Women's Hockey League (CWHL) would discontinue operations. In response to the folding of the CWHL, players from both leagues were dissatisfied in the operation of both the NWHL and CWHL in that neither league provided health insurance or a livable salary. Due to these conditions, over 200 players released a joint statement announcing their intent to not participate in any North American professional league for the 2019–20 season. In response, the NWHL committed to pursuing many more sponsors than in previous years in hopes of increasing player salaries.

On May 17, 2019, it was reported that the New Jersey Devils were ending their partnership with the Riveters. Following the dissolution of the partnership, the Riveters no longer had a lease to operate out of Barnabas Health Hockey House at the Prudential Center in Newark, which they had used rent-free as part of their partnership. The team then changed home venues to ProSkate Ice Arena in Monmouth Junction, New Jersey, and returned to their original blue, red, and white colors. The team was eliminated in the semifinal game by the Minnesota Whitecaps prior to the championship being cancelled by the COVID-19 pandemic.

The following season was then delayed amidst the capacity and travel restrictions during the pandemic. The 2020–21 season eventually started on January 23, 2021, with the entire season to be played at Herb Brooks Arena in Lake Placid, New York, without fans in attendance and teams kept in isolation. However, after playing three games, the Riveters were forced to withdraw from the two-week season on January 28 after several members of the organization tested positive for COVID-19.

On May 26, 2021, the league announced the Riveters had been sold to BTM Partners, owners of the Boston Pride and Toronto Six, with John Boynton named the team's chairman.

On September 14, 2022, the Riveters announced that they would play their home games at The Rink at the American Dream Meadowlands retail and entertainment complex for the next three years.

On June 29, 2023, it was announced that the PHF and its assets had been purchased as part of a bid to create a new, unified professional women's league. This led to the PHF and its teams folding, and the founding of the Professional Women's Hockey League in August 2023.

== Season-by-season records ==
Note: GP = Games played, W = Wins, L = Losses, T = Ties, OTL = Overtime losses, SOL = Shootout losses, Pts = Points, GF = Goals for, GA = Goals against

Season	GP	W	L	T	OTL	SOL	Pts (Note: Starting with the 2021–22 season, 3 points are awarded for a regulation win, 2 points are awarded for an overtime/shootout win, 1 point is awarded for an overtime/shootout loss, 0 points are awarded for a regulation loss)	GF	GA	Playoffs
2015–16	18	4	12	0	2	0	10	47	78	Lost Preliminary Round to Boston Pride
2016–17	18	8	7	0	1	2	19	55	58	Lost Preliminary Round to Buffalo Beauts
2017–18	16	13	3	—	0	—	26	64	30	Won Isobel Cup Championship over Buffalo Beauts
2018–19	16	4	12	—	0	0	8	32	65	Lost Semifinal game to Minnesota Whitecaps
2019–20	24	10	11	—	3	—	23	70	91	Lost Semifinal game to Minnesota Whitecaps
2020–21	3	2	1	—	0	—	4	7	4	Forced to withdraw from season due to positive cases of COVID-19
2021–22	20	7	12	—	1	0	21	54	65	Lost Preliminary Round to Minnesota Whitecaps
2022–23	24	11	13	—	0	0	30	64	79	Did not qualify
PHF Totals	139	59	71	0	7	2	141	393	470	

== Team ==
=== 2022–23 roster ===
As of December 9, 2022

No.	Nat	Player	Pos	S/G	Age	Acquired	Birthplace
9	(United States)	Kaycie Anderson (A)	F	L	34	2022	Maple Plain, Minnesota
8	(Canada)	Kelly Babstock	F	L	33	2020	Mississauga, Ontario
12	(Sweden)	Ebba Berglund	D	L	27	2022	Örnsköldsvik, Sweden
16	(Canada)	Sarah Bujold	F	L	29	2022	Riverview, New Brunswick
–	(United States)	Katie Burt	G	L	29	2022	Lynn, Massachusetts
10	(United States)	Kendall Cornine	F	R	29	2019	Livingston, New Jersey
97	(United States)	Catherine Crawley	F	L	29	2022	Washingtonville, New York
13	(Hungary)	Réka Dabasi	F	L	29	2022	Budapest, Hungary
3	(Switzerland)	Sarah Forster	D	L	32	2022	Berneck, Switzerland
77	(Canada)	Kennedy Ganser	F	R	28	2022	Provost, Alberta
94	(Hungary)	Fanni Garát-Gasparics	F	R	31	2022	Budapest, Hungary
22	(United States)	Emilie Harley	D	L	26	2022	Syracuse, New York
5	(Finland)	Anna Kilponen	D	L	30	2022	Orivesi, Finland
1	(Finland)	Eveliina Mäkinen	G	L	30	2022	Kuikainen, Finland
44	(United States)	Taylor Marchin	D	R	32	2022	Algonac, Michigan
28	(United States)	Leah Marino	F	L	25	2022	South Lake Tahoe, California
33	(Canada)	Rachel McQuigge	G	L	27	2022	Bowmanville, Ontario
14	(United States)	Madison Packer (C)	F	R	34	2015	Detroit, Michigan
21	(United States)	Amanda Pelkey (A)	F	R	32	2022	Montpelier, Vermont
18	(United States)	Reagan Rust	D	R	28	2022	Southaven, Mississippi
15	(Finland)	Minttu Tuominen (A)	D	R	35	2022	Helsinki, Finland

Coaching staff and team personnel

- General Manager: Tori Charron
- Head coach: Venla Hovi
- Associate head coach: Ivo Mocek
- Goaltending coach: Mitch Harris
- Equipment manager: Regina Bataille

=== Team captains ===
- Ashley Johnston, 2015–2018
- Michelle Picard, 2018–19
- Madison Packer, 2019–2023

=== Head coaches ===
- Chad Wiseman, 2015–2018
- Randy Velischek, 2018–19
- Ivo Mocek, 2019–2022
- Venla Hovi, 2022–2023

=== General managers ===
- Dani Rylan, 2015–16
- Kate Whitman Annis, 2019–2021
- Anya Packer, 2021–22
- Tori Charron, 2022–2023

== NWHL draft ==
A draft lottery was held for the 2015 NWHL Draft, taking place on June 20, 2015. and the New York Riveters earned the first pick overall. With the first pick in the 2015 NWHL Draft, the New York Riveters selected Alex Carpenter.

=== 2015 NWHL draft ===
The following were the Riveters selections in the 2015 NWHL Draft on June 20, 2015.

#	Player	Position	Nationality	College
1	Alex Carpenter	Forward	United States	Boston College
5	Haley Skarupa	Forward	United States	Boston College
9	Erin Ambrose	Defense	Canada	Clarkson University
13	Dana Trivigno	Forward	United States	Boston College
17	Kimberly Newell	Goalie	Canada	Princeton

== Awards and honors ==
- Ashley Johnston, New York Riveters, 2017 NWHL Denna Laing Perseverance Award
- Katie Fitzgerald, New York Riveters, 2017 NWHL Goaltender of the Year

== Franchise milestones ==
Milestone	Player	Date
First goal	Brooke Ammerman	October 11, 2015
First game-winning goal	Bray Ketchum	November 15, 2015
First hat trick	Meghan Fardelmann	December 27, 2015
First multi-point game	To Be Determined	To Be Determined
First win	Nana Fujimoto	November 15, 2015
First African-American player	Cherie Stewart	November 15, 2015
First shutout	Katie Fitzgerald	November 20, 2016
