= Isobel Cup =

Premier Hockey Federation championship trophy

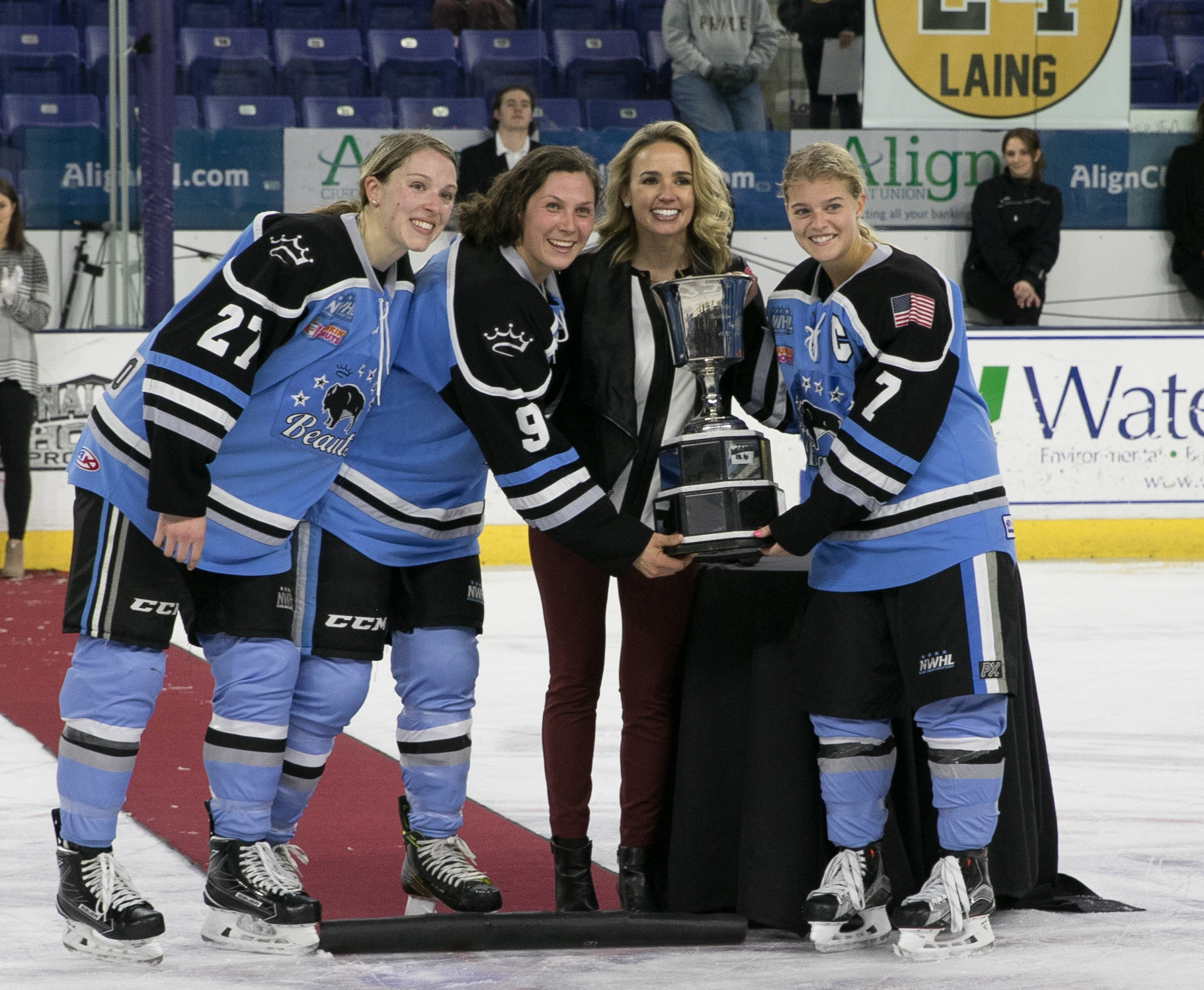
- The Buffalo Beauts receiving the Isobel Cup in 2017
- Sport: Ice hockey
- Awarded for: Playoff champion of the Premier Hockey Federation
- Country: Canada; United States

History
- First award: 2016
- Editions: 7
- First winner: Boston Pride
- Most wins: Boston Pride (3)
- Most recent: Toronto Six

The Lady Isobel Gathorne-Hardy Cup, often shortened to Isobel Cup, was the championship trophy that was awarded annually to the Premier Hockey Federation (PHF) playoff winner. The trophy is named after Lady Isobel Gathorne-Hardy, the daughter of Lord Stanley—former Governor General of Canada and namesake of the Stanley Cup—and one of the first women known to play the game of ice hockey.

The Isobel Cup was last awarded in 2023. After the 2022–23 season concluded, the PHF was bought out as part of the process of establishing the new Professional Women's Hockey League (PWHL), leaving the Isobel Cup's status in limbo.

== History ==
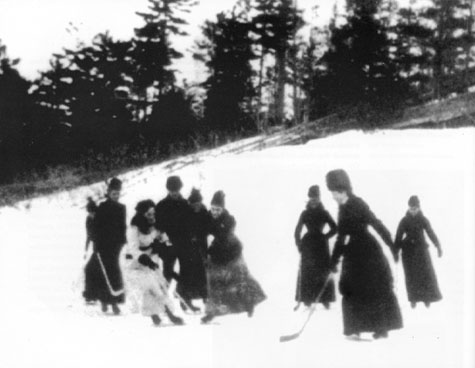
Lady Isobel Gathorne-Hardy (in white) playing hockey c. 1890.

=== Creation and design ===
The Isobel Cup was first unveiled in 2016 during the playoffs of the National Women's Hockey League (NWHL), which rebranded as the PHF in 2021. League commissioner Dani Rylan stated that the league worked with the Hockey Hall of Fame in designing the trophy, and that when she learned about the story of Lady Isobel—her early love for hockey and direct connection to Lord Stanley—the name was obvious. The front of the trophy features the following inscription:

"The Lady Isobel Gathorne-Hardy Cup 1875–1963. This Cup shall be awarded annually to the greatest professional women's hockey team in North America. All who pursue this Cup, pursue a dream; a dream born with Isobel, that shall never die. EST. 2016."

The Cup was unveiled to serve as the league's championship trophy, awarded at the conclusion of the PHF playoffs in March.

=== NWHL/PHF Championship (2016–2023) ===
The Isobel Cup was first awarded in 2016, with the Boston Pride winning the inaugural title by defeating the Buffalo Beauts 2–0 in a best-of-three championship series; the Pride won the first game in overtime, before securing the title with a 3–1 victory in the second. Boston forward Brianna Decker was named Most Valuable Player (MVP). After the win, Decker stated, "It felt like the Stanley Cup. That's exactly what we were going for with women's hockey. It's fantastic."

2017 brought a re-match in the championship between Boston and Buffalo. This time, it was a winner-take-all match instead of a series, and the Beauts emerged victorious with a 3–2 win to secure their first title. The Beauts advanced to their third consecutive final in 2018, defeating Boston 3–2 in overtime in the semi-final before losing 1–0 against the Metropolitan Riveters and MVP goaltender Katie Fitzgerald. The Beauts extended their streak of finals appearances to four in 2019; however, the expansion Minnesota Whitecaps secured their first championship with a 2–1 overtime victory, with Lee Stecklein scoring the title-winning goal.

The 2020 championship was slated to be played between Boston and Minnesota. However, it was initially delayed due to the emerging COVID-19 pandemic, before it was cancelled outright in May 2020.

League play resumed in 2021, with a shortened "bubble" season taking place at Herb Brooks Arena in Lake Placid, New York. The final featured a match-up of the cancelled 2020 final between Boston and Minnesota, with the Pride emerging victorious with a 4–3 win. This made the Pride the first team to win the championship twice. In 2022, the Pride won unprecedented back-to-back championships, defeating the Connecticut Whale in the title game by a score of 4–2.

In 2023, the Toronto Six became the first and to date only Canadian team to win the Isobel Cup, securing a 4–3 overtime victory over Minnesota in the final with Tereza Vanišová scoring the title-winning goal.

=== Demise of the PHF (2023) ===
From 2016 to 2019, the Isobel Cup was awarded roughly concurrently with the Clarkson Cup, the championship trophy for the Canadian Women's Hockey League (CWHL). The CWHL abruptly ceased operations in 2019, leaving the NWHL as the only top-level women's league in North America. However, in the wake of the collapse of the CWHL, more than 200 female players formed the Professional Women's Hockey Players Association (PWHPA) to advocate for the creation of a stable, unified North American professional league. In 2023, the PWHPA's business partners bought out the PHF before launching the Professional Women's Hockey League (PWHL).

The closure of the PHF left the Isobel Cup in limbo. It was suggested that the new league could seek to incorporate both the Clarkson and Isobel Cups, with both having important legacies in women's hockey. However, in April 2024, the PWHL unveiled the Walter Cup—named after the Walter family, the league's financial backers—as its new championship trophy.

== Champions ==
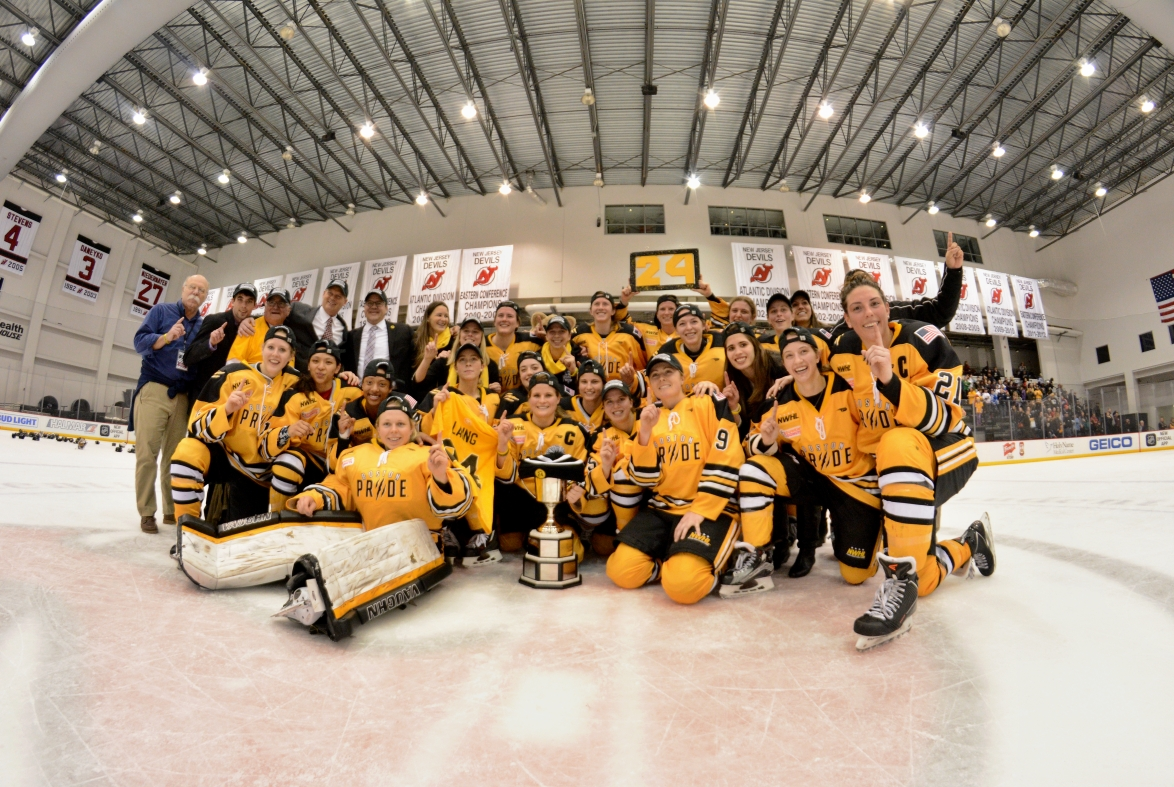
The Boston Pride won the inaugural Isobel Cup in 2016, and later won it twice more.

Year	Champion	Coach	Score	Runner-up	Coach
2016	Boston Pride	Bobby Jay	4–3 (OT), 3–1 (Note: The inaugural Isobel Cup final was played as a best-of-three series, with Boston winning the series 2–0; subsequent finals were single games.)	Buffalo Beauts	Ric Seiling
2017	Buffalo Beauts	Ric Seiling	3–2	Boston Pride	Bobby Jay
2018	Metropolitan Riveters	Chad Wiseman	1–0	Buffalo Beauts	Ric Seiling
2019	Minnesota Whitecaps	Jack Brodt & Ronda Engelhardt	2–1 (OT)	Buffalo Beauts	Cody McCormick
2020	Isobel Cup not awarded (Note: March 13 Minnesota Whitecaps vs. Boston Pride Championship game initially postponed, eventually (May 15) cancelled due to the COVID-19 pandemic.)				
2021	Boston Pride	Paul Mara	4–3	Minnesota Whitecaps	Jack Brodt & Ronda Engelhardt
2022	Boston Pride	Paul Mara	4–2	Connecticut Whale	Colton Orr
2023	Toronto Six	Geraldine Heaney	4–3 (OT)	Minnesota Whitecaps	Ronda Engelhardt

=== Appearances ===
Isobel Cup winning years denoted in bold.

Appearances	Team	Wins	Losses	Win %	Isobel Cup finals
4	Boston Pride	3	1	.750	**2016**, 2017, **2021**, **2022**
4	Buffalo Beauts	1	3	.250	2016, **2017**, 2018, 2019
3	Minnesota Whitecaps	1	2	.333	**2019**, 2021, 2023
1	Metropolitan Riveters	1	0	1.000	**2018**
1	Toronto Six	1	0	1.000	**2023**
1	Connecticut Whale	0	1	.000	2022

== See also ==
- List of sports awards honoring women
