= 2022–23 Boston Pride season =

Eighth season in franchise history

2022–23 Boston Pride
- League: 1st PHF
- 2022–23 record: 19–4–1
- Home record: 11–1–0
- Road record: 8–3–1
- Goals for: 92
- Goals against: 52

Team information
- General manager: Madison Rigsby
- Coach: Paul Mara
- Assistant coach: Courtney Sheary; Marissa Gedman
- Captain: Jillian Dempsey
- Alternate captains: McKenna Brand; Kaleigh Fratkin
- Arena: Warrior Ice Arena

Team leaders
- Goals: Loren Gabel (20)
- Assists: Loren Gabel (20)
- Points: Loren Gabel (40)
- Penalty minutes: Olivia Zafuto (29)
- Wins: Corinne Schroeder (19)
- Goals against average: Corinne Schroeder (1.67)

The 2022–23 Boston Pride season is the eighth ice hockey season in Boston Pride franchise history. A charter team of the Premier Hockey Federation (PHF), the 2022–23 season also marks the team's eighth season in the league. The two-time defending Isobel Cup champions, the franchise will attempt to become the first to capture three Cup championships in a row.

== Regular season ==
=== News and notes ===
- November 5: Élizabeth Giguère scored the first goal of the season and Loren Gabel recorded the first multi-goal game of the season.
- November 18: Rookie goaltender Corinne Schroeder set a new league record for consecutive shutouts, recording three shutouts across the first three games of the season.
- December 11, 2022: Corinne Schroeder stopped all 25 shots to set a new PHF single season record with her fourth shutout in just seven starts for the first place Pride.
- December 12, 2022: Jillian Dempsey tied a PHF record with six points on Sunday including her first career hat-trick to lead Boston in a 7–5 win versus Buffalo.

=== Standings ===
Pos	Team	Pld	W	OTW	OTL	L	GF	GA	GD	Pts	
1	Boston Pride	24	15	4	1	4	92	52	+40	54	Playoffs
2	Toronto Six	24	15	2	2	5	87	62	+25	51	Playoffs
3	Connecticut Whale	24	13	1	2	8	83	66	+17	43	Playoffs
4	Minnesota Whitecaps	24	10	0	3	11	58	66	−8	33	Playoffs
5	Metropolitan Riveters	24	8	3	0	13	64	79	−15	30	
6	Montreal Force	24	5	3	2	14	56	70	−14	23	
7	Buffalo Beauts	24	5	0	3	16	50	95	−45	18	

Updated to match(es) played on March 5, 2023. Source: PHF (Note: A win in regulation time is awarded 3 points, 2 points are awarded for an overtime/shootout win, 1 point is awarded for an overtime/shootout loss, 0 points are awarded for a regulation loss) (Note: Tiebreaker order is: points, head-to-head record, regulation wins, wins, goal difference)

=== Schedule ===
2022–23 game log: (home: 11–1–0; road: 8–3–1)
November: 5–1–0, 13 points (home: 3–1–0; road: 2–0–0)

Game	Date	Opponent	Score	OT	Decision	Location	Record	Points	Recap
1	November 5	Connecticut Whale	4–0		Schroeder	Warrior Ice Arena	1–0–0	3	
2	November 6	Metropolitan Riveters	2–0		Schroeder	Warrior Ice Arena	2–0–0	6	
3	November 18	@ Minnesota Whitecaps	2–0		Schroeder	Richfield Ice Arena	3–0–0	9	
4	November 19	@ Minnesota Whitecaps	5–4	OT	Schroeder	Richfield Ice Arena	4–0–0	11	
5	November 26	Toronto Six	3–2	OT	Schroeder	Warrior Ice Arena	5–0–0	13	
6	November 27	Toronto Six	3–7		Schroeder	Warrior Ice Arena	5–1–0	13	

December: 2–1–0, 6 points (home: 0–0–0; road: 2–1–0)

Game	Date	Opponent	Score	OT	Decision	Location	Record	Points	Recap
7	December 10	@ Buffalo Beauts	3–0		Schroeder	Northtown Center	6–1–0	16	
8	December 11	@ Buffalo Beauts	7–5		Schroeder	Northtown Center	7–1–0	19	
9	December 18	@ Connecticut Whale	4–6		Schroeder	International Skating Center of CT	7–2–0	19	

January: 5–0–1, 15 points (home: 2–0–0; road: 3–0–1)

Game	Date	Opponent	Score	OT	Decision	Location	Record	Points	Recap
10	January 6	@ Connecticut Whale	5–2		Schroeder	International Skating Center of CT	8–2–0	22	
11	January 7	@ Metropolitan Riveters	4–1		Schroeder	The Rink at American Dream	9–2–0	25	
12	January 14	Buffalo Beauts	8–0		Schroeder	Warrior Ice Arena	10–2–0	28	
13	January 15	Buffalo Beauts	2–1	OT	Schroeder	Warrior Ice Arena	11–2–0	30	
14	January 21	@ Montreal Force	5–0		Schroeder	Centre Premier Tech	12–2–0	33	
15	January 22	@ Montreal Force	1–2	OT	Schroeder	Centre Premier Tech	12–2–1	34	

February: 4–1–0, 12 points (home: 4–0–0; road: 0–1–0)

Game	Date	Opponent	Score	OT	Decision	Location	Record	Points	Recap
16	February 4	Metropolitan Riveters	5–0		Schroeder	Warrior Ice Arena	13–2–1	37	
17	February 5	Connecticut Whale	5–2		Schroeder	Warrior Ice Arena	14–2–1	40	
18	February 18	Montreal Force	4–1		Schroeder	Warrior Ice Arena	15–2–1	43	
19	February 19	Montreal Force	2–1		Schroeder	Warrior Ice Arena	16–2–1	46	
20	February 24	@ Metropolitan Riveters	2–6		Selander	The Rink at American Dream	16–3–1	46	

March: 3–1–0, 8 points (home: 2–0–0; road: 1–1–0)

Game	Date	Opponent	Score	OT	Decision	Location	Record	Points	Recap
21	March 3	Minnesota Whitecaps	5–4	SO	Schroeder	Warrior Ice Arena	17–3–1	48	
22	March 4	Minnesota Whitecaps	5–1		Schroeder	Warrior Ice Arena	18–3–1	51	
23	March 11	@ Toronto Six	3–2		Schroeder	Canlan Ice Sports – York	19–3–1	54	
24	March 12	@ Toronto Six	4–5		Selander	Canlan Ice Sports – York	19–4–1	54	

Regulation Win (3 points) Overtime/Shootout win (2 points) Overtime/shootout loss (1 point) Regulation Loss (0 points)

=== Playoffs ===
The Boston Pride ended the regular season as the top-ranked team in the PHF. They earned the top playoff spot, with their first playoff series against the fourth-place Minnesota Whitecaps starting on Thursday, March 16 at Bentley Arena in Waltham, Massachusetts. The Whitecaps swept the Pride, two games to none in the series.

2023 Isobel Cup Playoffs
Playoff schedule (0–2–0)

Game	Date	Opponent	Score	OT	Decision	Location	Box Score/Recap
1	March 16	Minnesota Whitecaps	2–5		Schroeder	Bentley Arena	
2	March 18	Minnesota Whitecaps	1–4		Schroeder	Bentley Arena	

== Roster ==
=== 2022–23 roster ===
As of November 5, 2022

No.	Nat	Player	Pos	S/G	Age	Acquired	Birthplace
2	(United States)	Meaghan Rickard	F	R	29	2022	Coventry, Rhode Island
3	(United States)	Olivia Zafuto	D	L	29	2022	Niagara Falls, New York
4	(United States)	Lauren Kelly	D	L	30	2018	Watertown, Massachusetts
6	(United States)	Kali Flanagan	D	R	30	2021	Burlington, Massachusetts
8	(Canada)	Élizabeth Giguère	F	R	29	2022	Quebec City, Quebec
9	(United States)	Allie Thunstrom	F	R	38	2022	Maplewood, Minnesota
10	(United States)	Taylor House	F	–	27	2022	Joliet, Illinois
12	(United States)	Jenna Rheault	D	R	30	2019	Deering, New Hampshire
13	(Canada)	Kaleigh Fratkin	D	R	34	2017	Burnaby, British Columbia
14	(United States)	Jillian Dempsey (C)	F	L	35	2015	Winthrop, Massachusetts
15	(United States)	Becca Gilmore	F	R	28	2022	Wayland, Massachusetts
17	(United States)	McKenna Brand	F	L	30	2018	Park Rapids, Minnesota
18	(United States)	Taylor Wenczkowski	F	R	28	2020	Rochester, New Hampshire
19	(United States)	Sammy Davis	F	L	28	2020	Pembroke, Massachusetts
21	(Canada)	Christina Putigna	F	L	28	2019	Grimsby, Ontario
29	(Canada)	Kayla Friesen	F	L	28	2021	Winnipeg, Manitoba
30	(Canada)	Corinne Schroeder	G	L	26	2022	Elm Creek, Manitoba
35	(Sweden)	Lovisa Selander	G	L	31	2019	Sollentuna, Sweden
36	(Canada)	Loren Gabel	F	L	29	2022	Kitchener, Ontario
37	(Czech Republic)	Aneta Tejralová	D	L	30	2022	Prague, Czechia
42	(United States)	Meghara McManus	F	R	28	2020	Milton, Massachusetts
88	(United States)	Katie Burt	G	L	29	2018	Lynn, Massachusetts

Coaching staff and team personnel

- Head coach: Paul Mara
- Assistant coach: Marissa Gedman
- Athletic trainer: Jerry Foster

== Statistics ==
As of March 18, 2023.

=== Skaters ===
	Regular season						Playoffs					
Player	GP	G	A	Pts	SOG	PIM	GP	G	A	Pts	SOG	PIM
Loren Gabel	22	20	20	40	146	4	2	1	0	1	17	0
Jillian Dempsey	24	14	14	28	62	6	2	0	1	1	1	0
Élizabeth Giguère	18	6	16	22	70	4	2	0	0	0	8	0
Allie Thunstrom	24	11	7	18	88	6	2	0	1	1	6	0
Christina Putigna	24	9	9	18	63	10	2	0	0	0	6	0
Kali Flanagan	21	3	13	16	49	6	2	0	0	0	10	2
Sammy Davis	24	6	8	14	50	18	2	0	0	0	8	0
McKenna Brand	24	4	8	12	46	6	2	0	0	0	4	0
Kaleigh Fratkin	24	3	9	12	50	16	2	0	2	2	2	2
Olivia Zafuto	22	5	5	10	33	29	2	0	0	0	3	0
Aneta Tejralová	24	2	7	9	11	10	2	0	0	0	1	0
Taylor Wenczkowski	24	2	7	9	64	10	2	1	0	1	5	0
Taylor House	24	3	3	6	26	16	2	0	0	0	0	0
Becca Gilmore	11	1	5	6	16	0	2	1	1	2	6	0
Jenna Rheault	24	1	4	5	20	6	2	0	0	0	3	2
Kayla Friesen	22	2	1	3	16	4	2	0	0	0	0	2
Meghara McManus	24	0	3	3	23	8	2	0	0	0	0	0
Lexie Laing	6	0	1	1	3	0	0	0	0	0	0	0
Lauren Kelly	0	0	0	0	0	0	0	0	0	0	0	0
Taylor Turnquist	7	0	2	2	6	0	0	0	0	0	0	0
Taylor Accursi	2	0	2	2	1	0	0	0	0	0	0	0

=== Goaltenders ===
	Regular season																Playoffs															
Player	GP	W	L	T	OT	TOI	SA	GA	SV%	GAA	SO	Sv	PIM	G	A	GS	GP	W	L	T	OT	TOI	SA	GA	SV%	GAA	SO	Sv	PIM	G	A	GS
Corinne Schroeder	22	19	1	0	1	1290:15	797	36	.955	1.67	7	761	0	0	2	22	2	0	2	0	0	118:40	64	7	.891	3.54	0	57	0	0	0	2
Lovisa Selander	3	0	3	0	0	161:19	92	15	.817	5.58	0	67	0	0	0	2	0	0	0	0	0	00:00	0	0	.000	0.00	0	0	0	0	0	0

== Awards and honors ==
=== Season Awards ===
- Most Valuable Player: Loren Gabel
- Outstanding Player of the Year: Loren Gabel
- Defender of the Year: Kali Flanagan
- Goaltender of the Year: Corinne Schroeder
- Newcomer of the Year: Loren Gabel
- Rookie of the Year: Corinne Schroeder
- Denna Laing Award: Lauren Kelly

=== PHF Foundation Award ===
- Sammy Davis

=== Player of the Month ===
- November 2022: Corinne Schroeder
- February 2023: Loren Gabel

=== Three Stars of the Week ===
- Corinne Schroeder: First Star (November 5–6, 2022)
- Elizabeth Giguere: Third Star (November 5–6, 2022)
- Corinne Schroeder: Second Star (November 18–20, 2022)
- Loren Gabel: Second Star (December 9–11, 2022)
- Loren Gabel: Second Star (January 6–8, 2023)
- Allie Thunstrom: First Star (January 14–15, 2023)
- Loren Gabel: First Star (January 17–22, 2023)
- Loren Gabel: First Star (February 3–6, 2023)
- Corinne Schroeder: Third Star (February 3–6, 2023)
- Corinne Schroeder: First Star (February 18–19, 2023)
- Jillian Dempsey: Third Star (March 3–5, 2023)

== Transactions ==
=== Signings ===
Date	Player	Position	Term	Previous Team
July 18, 2022	McKenna Brand	F	1 year	Boston Pride
July 19, 2022	Becca Gilmore	F	1 year	Harvard
July 20, 2022	Meghara McManus	F	1 year	Boston Pride
July 21, 2022	Allie Thunstrom	F	2 years	Minnesota Whitecaps
July 24, 2022	Christina Putigna	F	1 year	Boston Pride
July 25, 2022	Kali Flanagan	D	2 years	Boston Pride
July 26, 2022	Lauren Kelly	D	1 year	Boston Pride
July 28, 2022	Élizabeth Giguère	F	1 year	Minnesota Duluth
August 1, 2022	Taylor Wenczkowski	F	1 year	Boston Pride
August 2, 2022	Corinne Schroeder	G	1 year	Boston University
August 8, 2022	Aneta Tejralová	D	1 year	SKIF Nizhny Novgorod
August 10, 2022	Sammy Davis	F	1 year	Boston Pride
September 24, 2022	Kaleigh Fratkin	D	2 years $57,500 AAV + $5,000 signing bonus	Boston Pride
September 25, 2022	Lovisa Selander	G	1 year	Boston Pride
September 26, 2022	Jenna Rheault	D	1 year	Boston Pride
October 3, 2022	Loren Gabel	F	2 years	PWHPA
October 5, 2022	Kayla Friesen	F	1 year	Boston Pride
October 7, 2022	Olivia Zafuto	D	1 year	Linköping HC Dam
October 20, 2022	Taylor House	F	1 year $29,000	Quinnipiac University
November 1, 2022	Jillian Dempsey	F	2 years $40,000 AAV	Boston Pride
