= Taylor House (ice hockey) =

American ice hockey player (born 1998)

- Born: September 29, 1998 (age 27) Joliet, Illinois, United States
- Height: 5 ft 10 in (178 cm)
- Position: Centre
- Shoots: Left
- PWHL team Former teams: Boston Fleet: Ottawa Charge; MoDo Hockey; Boston Pride; Quinnipiac Bobcats
- Playing career: 2017–present

Taylor House (born September 29, 1998) is an American professional ice hockey player for the Boston Fleet of the Professional Women's Hockey League (PWHL). She previously played for the Boston Pride in the Premier Hockey Federation (PHF) and with MoDo Hockey in the Swedish Women's Hockey League (SDHL), and the Ottawa Charge.

== Playing career ==
As a teen, House played in the Tier 1 Elite Hockey League (T1EHL) with Chicago Fury junior teams. She won the T1EHL under-16 (U16) Championship with the Chicago Fury U16 in 2014 and was a two-time Can/Am Tournament Champion. House was invited to USA Hockey Player Development Camps in 2012, 2013, and 2014, and was selected to attend the USA Hockey 2015 Girls U18 Select Player Development Camp – also known as the 'U18 Select 66 Camp' or 'Top 66' in reference to the number of players invited – in Biddeford, Maine. While playing with the Chicago Fury U19, House committed to Quinnipiac University in 2015 and scored 48 goals in 2016–17, her final season of midget major.

=== NCAA ===
She joined the Quinnipiac Bobcats women's ice hockey program in the ECAC Hockey conference of the NCAA Division I as an incoming freshman in the 2017–18 season. Ahead of House's debut with the team, program head coach Cassandra Turner described her as a "big, strong power forward… [who] pressures the puck, wins battles and competes in all three zones… she also possesses a unique creativity and touch around the net." As a rookie, she tallied a total of 7 points on 4 goals and 3 assists and recorded 13 blocked shots across 35 games. She ranked fifth in team scoring in the 2018–19 season, with 9 goals and 6 assists for 15 points in 34 games, and scored the team's only short-handed goal of the season. Her point totals in the 2019–20 season were identical to the previous season (9+6=15), good for tenth in team scoring as the team saw increased offensive production from other players, and she recorded her first positive plus–minus for a season, with a +10 across 31 games.

The 2020–21 season saw the number of games halved due to the COVID-19 pandemic, but the truncated season played host to House's offensive breakout. She matched her point total from the previous two seasons, with 7 goals and 8 assists in just 16 games – tying Taylor Girard for most goals on the team and ranking third for team scoring. Presented with the opportunity to play a fifth year of NCAA college eligibility due to the COVID-19 pandemic, she opted to remain with the Quinnipiac Bobcats as a graduate student. The 2021–22 season built on the previous season's highs and House set personal records in every offensive metric, netting 16 goals and 10 assists for 26 points in 39 games (second on the team for goals and fourth for points).

House concluded her college career playing in the most successful late-season in Bobcats history, which culminated in their NCAA tournament quarterfinal debut. She scored in each of the final five games of her career, netting 4 goals and 3 assists during the ECAC quarterfinals through the 2022 NCAA women's ice hockey tournament.

Across her five-season career with the Bobcats, House's teammates included future PHF and/or PWHL players Sarah-Ève Coutu-Godbout, Taylor Girard, Abbie Ives, Anna Kilponen, Randi Marcon, Melissa Samoskevich, Kati Tabin, and future Boston Pride teammate Corinne Schroeder.

=== Professional ===
House signed her first professional contract with the Boston Pride in October 2022. The one-year contract had a salary valued at $29,000 and featured a $2,900 signing bonus. She earned her first PHF point – the primary assist on Becca Gilmore's first PHF goal – in a Pride home game against the Toronto Six on November 26, 2022. Her first PHF goal was scored in an away game against the Buffalo Beauts on December 10, 2022, with assists from McKenna Brand and Kaleigh Fratkin.

On June 18, 2025, House signed a one-year contract extension with the Ottawa Charge.

== Personal life ==
House was born and raised in Joliet, Illinois, a city 35 miles (56 km) southwest of Chicago. She attended secondary school at Minooka Community High School and played on the school's ice hockey team.

During her time as a graduate student at Quinnipiac, House was roommates with Taylor Girard, who was then playing her first season with the Connecticut Whale.

== Career statistics ==
			Regular season					Playoffs
Season	Team	League	GP	G	A	Pts	PIM	GP	G	A	Pts	PIM
2017–18	Quinnipiac University	NCAA	35	4	3	7	4	—	—	—	—	—
2018–19	Quinnipiac University	NCAA	34	9	6	15	12	—	—	—	—	—
2019–20	Quinnipiac University	NCAA	31	9	6	15	22	—	—	—	—	—
2020–21	Quinnipiac University	NCAA	16	7	8	15	17	—	—	—	—	—
2021–22	Quinnipiac University	NCAA	39	16	10	26	18	—	—	—	—	—
2022–23	Boston Pride	PHF	24	3	3	6	16	2	0	0	0	0
2023–24	MoDo Hockey	SDHL	35	13	4	17	20	10	1	3	4	14
2024–25	Ottawa Charge	PWHL	15	1	1	2	2	5	0	0	0	4
2025–26	Ottawa Charge	PWHL	19	0	0	0	8	8	0	1	1	0
PHF totals			24	3	3	6	16	2	0	0	0	0
SDHL totals			35	13	4	17	20	10	1	3	4	14
PWHL totals			44	1	1	2	10	13	0	1	1	4

== Awards and honors ==
=== SDHL ===
- Swedish Championship silver medal, 2023–24
