= Mary Parker (ice hockey) =

American ice hockey player

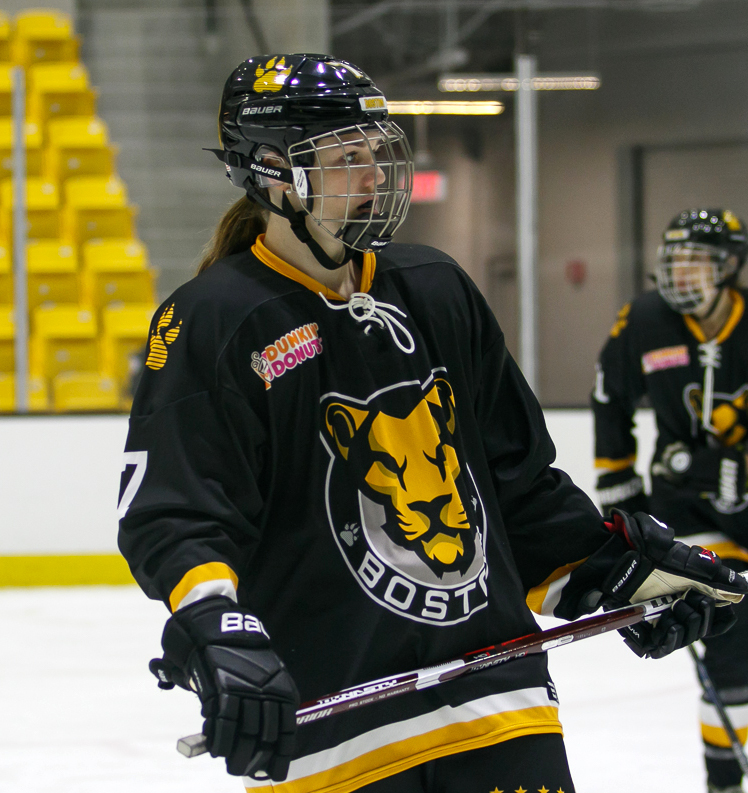
- Mary Parker playing for the Boston Pride in 2017
- Born: Milton, Massachusetts, U.S.
- Height: 5 ft 9 in (175 cm)
- Position: Forward
- Shoots: Left
- NWHL team: Boston Pride
- Playing career: 2017–present

Mary Parker is an American professional ice hockey player for the Boston Pride of the National Women's Hockey League (NWHL).

== Career ==
Parker began skating at the age of two, when her mother, who taught figure skating, brought her and her sibling to the New England Sports Complex in Marlborough, Massachusetts, and began playing hockey at the age of six. During her teenage years, she played for Assabet Valley before joining the Noble and Greenough School for her last two years of high school. She was awarded the 2012 John Carlton Award by the Boston Bruins along with Jimmy Vesey.

From 2012 to 2016, she played in the NCAA for Harvard University, often playing on a line with Lexie Laing and Karly Heffernan. She was named a Second Team All-ECAC and First Team All-Ivy League in 2015. She then missed almost all of the 2015–16 season after suffering a hip injury that required surgery. In 2016, she moved to Boston University for graduate studies, being offered a scholarship, and joined their women's ice hockey team for the 2016/17 NCAA season, finishing her collegiate career with 136 points in 140 games. She scored a career-high 45 points in 36 games with Boston, fourth in the NCAA in goals and being named a Hockey East Second Team All-Star.

After graduating, she signed her first professional contract with the NWHL's Boston Pride near the end of the 2016/17 NWHL season as a free agent. She played in the last regular season game for the Pride and appeared in both playoff games for the franchise, as they lost in the Isobel Cup finals to the Buffalo Beauts.

On 1 June 2017, it was announced that Parker had re-signed to play with the Boston Pride for their 2017/18 season.

Her point production massively increased in the 2019-20 NWHL season, with a career-high 15 goals and 24 point sin 17 games, as the Pride finished almost undefeated and made it to the Isobel Cup finals before the season was cancelled due to the COVID-19 pandemic in the United States.

== Style of play ==
The ninth-most tenured player in Pride history, Parker has been noted for her two-way play, especially her stamina, her ability to shield the puck from opponents, and her shooting skills.

== Personal life ==
Parker has a bachelor's degree in economics from Harvard University and a master's degree in financial economics from Boston University. Her sister, Elizabeth Parker, also played for the Boston Pride during the 2017-18 NWHL season, while her uncle, Al Hulbert, was drafted by the Boston Red Sox in the 15th round of the 1977 MLB Amateur Draft.

== Career statistics ==
			Regular season					Playoffs
Season	Team	League	GP	G	A	Pts	PIM	GP	G	A	Pts	PIM
2016-17	Boston Pride	NWHL	1	0	0	0	0	2	0	0	0	0
2017-18	Boston Pride	NWHL	15	1	2	3	6	1	0	2	2	0
2018-19	Boston Pride	NWHL	10	3	0	3	0	1	0	0	0	0
2019-20	Boston Pride	NWHL	17	15	9	24	6	1	0	1	1	2
NWHL totals			43	19	11	30	12	5	0	3	3	2
