= Anya Packer =

American ice hockey player and executive

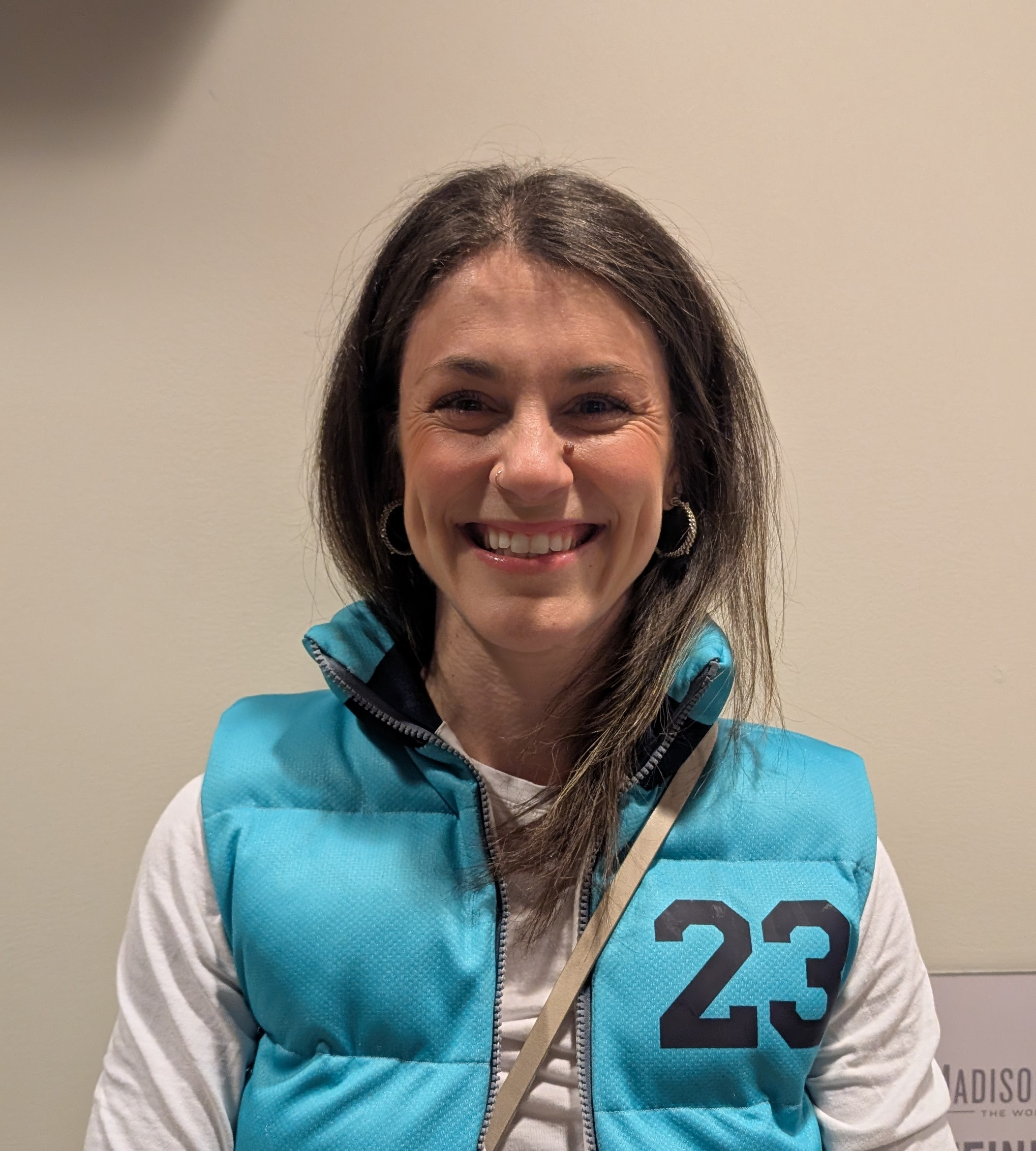
- Packer in 2026 at Madison Square Garden
- Born: November 19, 1991 (age 34) Waltham, Massachusetts, US
- Height: 5 ft 5 in (165 cm)
- Weight: 141 lb (64 kg; 10 st 1 lb)
- Position: Defense
- Shot: Left
- Played for: Connecticut Whale; Boston Blades; Boston University Terriers
- Playing career: 2010–2018

Anya Packer (née Battaglino; born November 19, 1991) is an American retired ice hockey player and former general manager of the Metropolitan Riveters of the Premier Hockey Federation (PHF). She played three PHF seasons with the Connecticut Whale before retiring from top-level play and stepping into the role as executive director of the Premier Hockey Federation Players' Association.

== Career ==
=== University ===
During college, Packer played for the Boston University Terriers women's ice hockey team during the 2010–11 and 2011–12 seasons.

=== CWHL ===
Packer began her post-collegiate career with the Boston Blades of the Canadian Women's Hockey League (CWHL) in the 2012–13 season, making her debut with the team in a game against the Calgary Inferno on December 10, 2012. In 2013, her first season with the team, Packer won the Clarkson Cup.

=== NWHL ===
Packer signed a contract with the Connecticut Whale in 2015, joining the franchise for the inaugural 2015–16 NWHL season. Packer was injured in a November 2015 game against the Buffalo Beauts.

Following the 2016–17 season, Packer was named one of the NWHL Fans' Three Stars of the Season alongside Harrison Browne and Rebecca Russo after a fan vote.

On the June 2, 2017, it was reported that Packer had signed an extension to play with the Connecticut Whale for the 2017–18 NWHL season.

== Post-playing career ==
In early 2017, Packer was named director of the NWHL Players' Association after serving as a players' representative in previous seasons.

In 2019, the NWHLPA negotiated a 50/50 revenue split between the league and players, leading to a 26% increase in player salaries.

She was named one of the 25 Most Powerful Women in Hockey by Sportsnet in 2020 and was named to the Forbes 30 Under 30 – Sports 2021 List.

Packer was named general manager of the Riveters for the 2021–22 season, but did not renew her contract the following year.

== Personal life ==
Packer has actively campaigned in support of mental health awareness and inclusivity in sport.

In March 2018, Packer came out and composed an accompanying commentary published on the website OutSports.com. On July 22, 2018, she became engaged to fellow NWHL player Madison Packer. The two married in August 2019 and welcomed their first child, Waylon, in September 2020.

In addition to her career as an ice hockey executive, Packer works in cybersecurity and technology research.
