= Lauren Kelly =

Lauren Kelly may refer to:

- Lauren Kelly, a pseudonym used by Joyce Carol Oates
- Lauren Kelly (ice hockey), American ice hockey player
