= Sammy Davis (ice hockey) =

American ice hockey forward

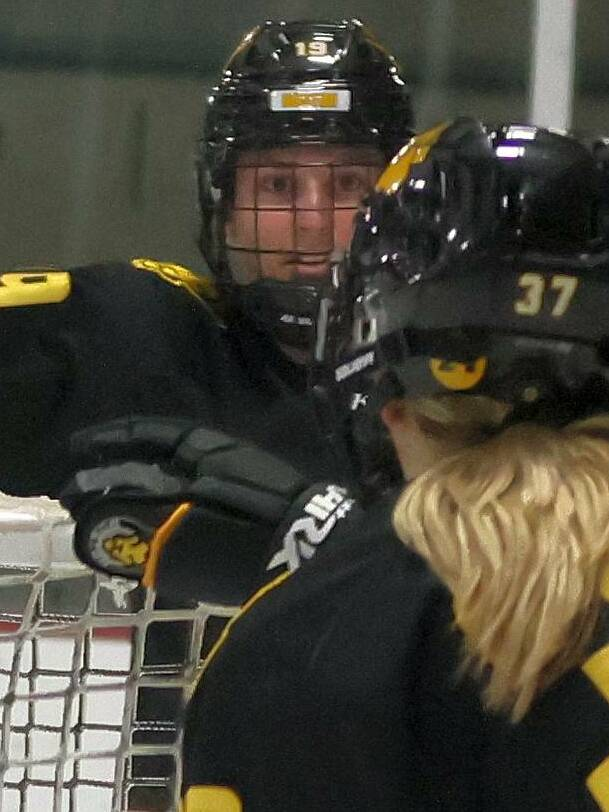
- Davis (19) in 2022
- Born: April 23, 1997 (age 29) Pembroke, Massachusetts, US
- Height: 5 ft 5 in (165 cm)
- Position: Left wing
- Shoots: Left
- PWHL team Former teams: Ottawa Charge; Boston University Terriers; Boston Pride
- Playing career: 2015–present

Samantha "Sammy" Davis (born April 23, 1997) is an American professional ice hockey forward for the Ottawa Charge of the Professional Women's Hockey League (PWHL). She was drafted 1st overall in the 2020 NWHL Draft by the Boston Pride following a two-year captaincy of the Boston University Terriers women's ice hockey.

== Playing career ==
While a high school athlete for Tabor Academy in Marion, Massachusetts, Davis was awarded the John Carlton Memorial Trophy, given out annually by the Boston Bruins of the NHL.

Davis was named to the Hockey East All-Rookie team, scoring 26 points in 39 games in the 2015–16 season. She would put up 23 points in 35 games the next year, before missing the entire 2017–18 season after having bilateral hip surgery. She finished her university career with 142 points in 147 games, being named to the Hockey East First-Team All-Star and MVP of the 2019 Beanpot Tournament in her final year. She was recognised with the Sarah Devens Award in 2020, the first player from Boston University to win the award.

Near the end of her university career, she contacted both the NWHL (renamed PHF in 2021) and the PWHPA to explore her professional options, expressing a hope that the two organisations would merge. She would end up being drafted by the NWHL's Boston Pride in April 2020, after they traded for the 1st overall pick from the Toronto Six. On April 30, 2020, she signed her first professional contract with the Pride.

Ahead of the 2020–21 NWHL season, she announced that she would be donating all profits she received from jersey sales to the Travis Roy Foundation for research on spinal cord injuries. Within five days of her announcement, she hit her $2,400 fundraising goal for the Foundation, with Boston Bruins forward Chris Wagner joining her charitable efforts.

=== International play ===
Davis served as assistant captain for Team USA in the 2018 IIHF World Women's U18 Championship, where she scored 3 points in 5 games as the country won gold.

== Personal life ==
Davis has a Master's Degree in Special Education, and has been admitted to the Massachusetts General Hospital doctorate program in occupational therapy. In high school, she had done research on a marine lab in the Atlantic Ocean.

Her elder sister, Alex, played with the Sacred Heart Pioneers women's ice hockey program from 2011 to 2015 and her twin brother, Bradley, played junior ice hockey in the United States Premier Hockey League.

== Career statistics ==
| | | | Regular Season | | | | | Playoffs |
| Season | Team | League | GP | G | A | Pts | PIM | GP | G | A | Pts | PIM |
|---|---|---|---|---|---|---|---|---|---|---|---|---|
| 2015–16 | Boston University | NCAA | 39 | 17 | 9 | 26 | 18 | – | – | – | – | – |
| 2016–17 | Boston University | NCAA | 35 | 7 | 16 | 23 | 26 | – | – | – | – | – |
| 2017–18 | Boston University | NCAA | – | – | – | – | – | – | – | – | – | – |
| 2018–19 | Boston University | NCAA | 37 | 25 | 27 | 52 | 22 | – | – | – | – | – |
| 2019–20 | Boston University | NCAA | 36 | 17 | 24 | 41 | 12 | – | – | – | – | – |
| 2020–21 | Boston Pride | NWHL | 7 | 4 | 1 | 5 | 2 | 2 | 1 | 0 | 1 | 0 |
| 2021-22 | Boston Pride | PHF | 20 | 5 | 7 | 12 | 10 | 3 | 0 | 1 | 1 | 0 |
| 2022–23 | Boston Pride | PHF | 24 | 6 | 8 | 14 | 18 | 2 | 0 | 0 | 0 | 0 |
| NCAA totals | | | 147 | 66 | 76 | 142 | 78 | – | – | – | – | – |
| PHF totals | | | 51 | 15 | 16 | 31 | 30 | 7 | 1 | 1 | 2 | 0 |

== Awards and honors ==
- 2020 Sarah Devens Award
- Finalist, 2021 NWHL Newcomer of the Year
