= Christina Putigna =

Canadian ice hockey player

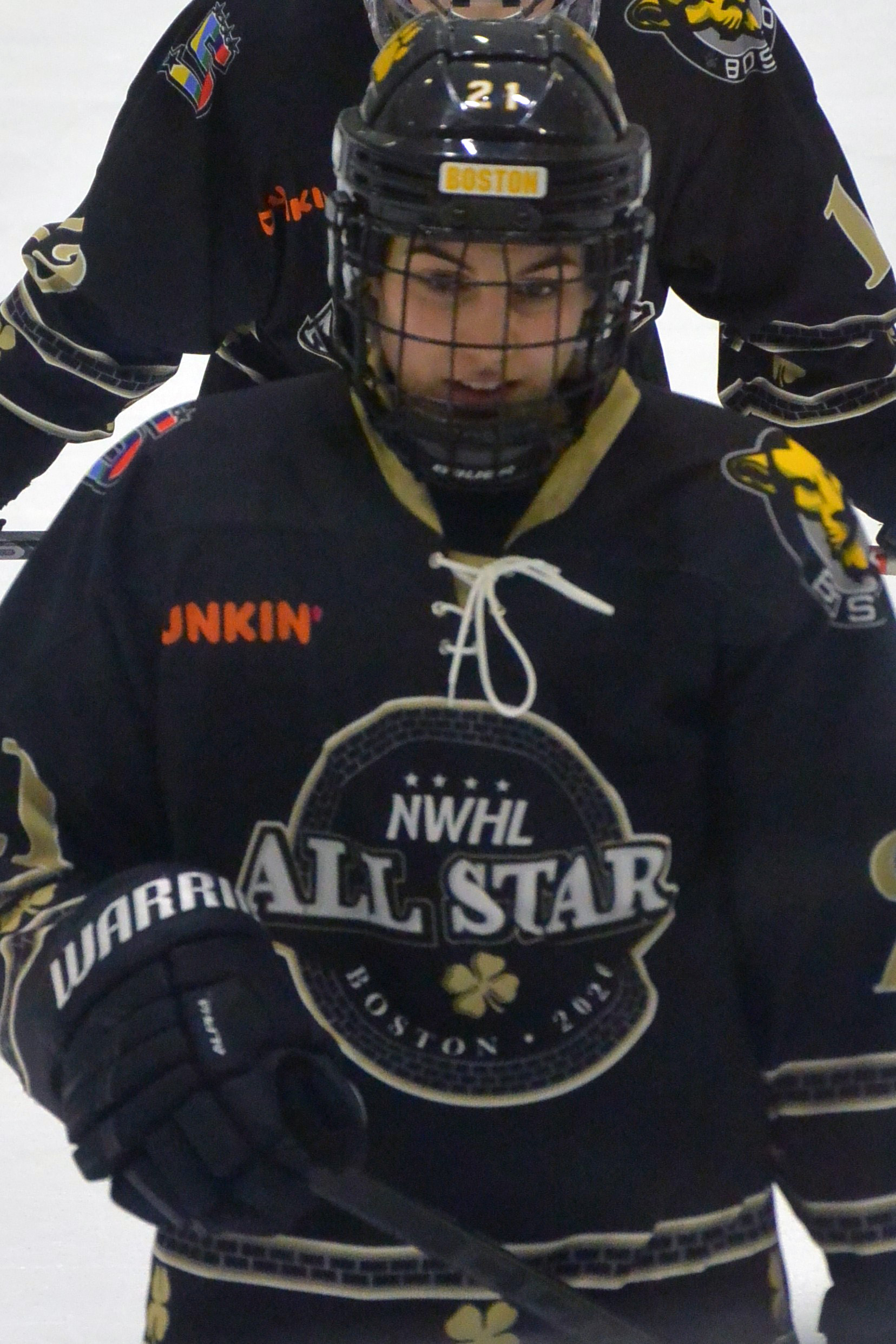
- Christina Putigna at the 2020 NWHL All Star Game
- Born: 16 October 1997 (age 29) Grimsby, Ontario, Canada
- Height: 5 ft 8 in (173 cm)
- Position: Forward
- Shot: Left
- Played for: Boston Pride
- Playing career: 2015–2023

Christina Putigna (born 16 October 1997) is a Canadian ice hockey forward, who most recently played for the Boston Pride of the Premier Hockey Federation (PHF). She currently holds the record for most points scored by a Canadian player in a single PHF season. Putigna was named the scoring PHF scoring leader in 2020/21. With the Pride she won back to back Isobel Cup Championships in 2020-2021 and 2021-2022.

Putigna played four years of Division I college hockey at Providence College. During her playing career with the Friars, she accumulated 110 points in 4 years (2015-2019). Was named to the Hockey East All-Tournament team in 2019. Served as assistant captain during her senior season with the Friars.

== Playing career ==
During high school, Putigna played two years for Blessed Trinity Catholic Secondary School in her hometown of Grimsby, Ontario, in addition to playing with the Stoney Creek Sabres and then Oakville Hornets in the Provincial Women's Hockey League (PWHL).

Across 135 NCAA games with the Providence Friars from 2015 to 2019, she scored 110 points, good for ninth all-time in program history. She scored 28 points in 38 games in her rookie collegiate season, finishing second on her team in scoring, third among all Hockey East rookies in scoring, and being named to the Hockey East All-Rookie Team. She scored a career-high 30 points in 33 games in her senior year, including her 100th NCAA point on 8 February 2019 against Maine.

Putigna was drafted by the Boston Pride in 2019 and signed her first professional contract with the team. As a rookie fixture playing on Boston's top line with Jillian Dempsey and McKenna Brand she finished 6th in the NWHL with 29 points, first among rookies as the Pride made it to the Isobel Cup finals before the season was cancelled due to the COVID-19 pandemic. She was selected as a forward to the 2020 NWHL All Star game, held in Boston. During the season, she was responsible for producing content for the team's TikTok page, along with fellow rookie Tori Sullivan.

She was re-signed by the Pride on 9 April 2020, the first player to be signed by the Pride for the 2020–21 season.

== International career ==
Putigna represented Canada at the U22 Summer Series against the United States in 2016. She was also selected to participate in the 2016 and 2017 Hockey Canada's National Women's Program Strength and Conditioning Camps. She has yet to make an appearance for the senior national team.

== Personal life ==
Putigna has a degree in Health Policy and Management from Providence College.

== Career stats ==
			Regular Season					Playoffs
Season	Team	League	GP	G	A	Pts	PIM	GP	G	A	Pts	PIM
2011–12	Stoney Creek Sabres	PWHL	1	0	0	0	0	–	–	–	–	–
2012–13	Stoney Creek Sabres	PWHL	2	1	0	1	0	–	–	–	–	–
2013–14	Oakville Hornets	PWHL	38	17	12	29	16	4	1	2	3	2
2014–15	Oakville Hornets	PWHL	38	12	16	28	16	12	3	8	11	4
2015–16	Providence Friars	NCAA	36	11	17	28	38	–	–	–	–	–
2016–17	Providence Friars	NCAA	37	9	19	28	44	–	–	–	–	–
2017–18	Providence Friars	NCAA	29	11	13	24	20	–	–	–	–	–
2018–19	Providence Friars	NCAA	33	15	15	30	28	–	–	–	–	–
2019–20	Boston Pride	NWHL	24	8	21	29	12	1	1	0	1	0
2019–20	Boston Pride	NWHL	7	2	6	8	2	1	0	2	2	0
NWHL totals			31	10	27	37	14	2	2	1	3	0

== Honours ==
- 2015–2016 Hockey East Rookie of the Month for November
- 2015–2016 Hockey East All-Rookie Team
- 2017–2018 Two Time Hockey East Top Performer
- 2018–2019 Hockey East All-Tournament Team
- 2019–2020 NWHL All Star Team
