= Boston University Terriers women's ice hockey =

- Current season
- University: Boston University
- Conference: Hockey East
- Head coach: Tara Watchorn; 3rd season, 38–30–5
- Arena: Walter Brown Arena; Boston, Massachusetts
- Colors: Scarlet and white
- Fight song: Go BU

NCAA tournament runner-up
- 2011, 2013

NCAA tournament Frozen Four
- 2011, 2013

NCAA tournament appearances
- 2010, 2011, 2012, 2013, 2014, 2015, 2025

Conference tournament champions
- 2010, 2012, 2013, 2014, 2015, 2025

Conference regular season champions
- 2011, 2013

The Boston University Terriers women's ice hockey team is the college ice hockey team that represents Boston University. The Terriers play in the Hockey East conference. From 2010 to 2015, the Terriers won five Hockey East Championships and made six consecutive NCAA Tournament appearances.

== History ==
2024–2025 The Terriers won their first Hockey East tournament title since 2015 after finishing second in the conference standings during the regular season.

2023–2024 Tara Watchorn begins her first season as the second Head Coach in program history.

2020–2021 Hockey East announced plans in November for a modified season, due to the ongoing COVID-19 pandemic. Teams will each play 18 games in a round robin format to determine the regular season champion. BU Terriers will play home and home series on weekends, with day of game travel, to allow time for testing, except when playing the Vermont Catamounts or Maine Black Bears.

2019–20 Boston University Terriers had a strong year and finished 24–8–4 overall, second in Hockey East. An upset by Maine Black Bears ended their season in the Hockey East quarterfinals. The NCAA tournament was cancelled in March because of the COVID-19 pandemic.

2015–16 Season On November 3, 2015, Rebecca Russo set the Boston University Terriers women's ice hockey record for most assists in one game, with five against Yale. The Terriers went on to win their fifth Hockey East championship, and the fourth in four seasons.

2013–14 Season An Olympic year, the Terriers would be forced to play without star Olympian Marie-Philip Poulin. But despite their frustrating loss in the NCAA Championship game, the team went on to complete an undefeated year in Walter Brown for the entirety of 2013 and the first half of the 2013–14 season, playing 20 undefeated games at Walter Brown Arena. The streak was broken on January 8, 2014, with a 4–1 loss to rival Boston College. The loss shook the Terriers and the team suffered a four-game losing streak between January 17–25. Despite being swept by Boston College at the conclusion of the regular season, BU entered the post season guns blazing and defeated Providence and Northeastern in two 3–2 decisions to advance to the Hockey East Championships against Regular Season Champions Boston College. BU entered the third period of the championship game down 2–1, after a rough second period marred by penalties for the Terriers. Early in the third, a goaltender interference penalty on BC opened up BU's chance and senior Louise Warren managed to fire a shot past the Eagle's senior goaltender, Corrine Boyles to tie the game at 2–2. Five minutes later, freshman Maddie Elia fired a shot from sophomore Rebecca Russo to beat Boyles and give the Terriers a 3–2 lead. BU held on for the remainder of the game and clinched its third consecutive and fourth total Hockey East Championship. Senior Kerrin Sperry was selected as MVP for the second straight year, the second WHEA player to ever receive back-to-back honors.

Winning the Hockey East Championship gave the Terriers the opportunity to advance to its fifth consecutive NCAA Quarterfinal game, but their low seed required them to play versus top-ranked Minnesota for a rematch of the 2013 championship game. BU could not enact revenge versus Minnesota and dropped the contest 5–1. BU's lone goal came at the hands of Sophomore Sarah Lefort in the first period. Lefort's goal was her 32nd of the season, making her the league leader in goals for the season. Senior Kerrin Sperry made 41 saves in the loss, ending her collegiate career with a program-record 85 wins and 13 shutouts. BU finished their season at 24–13–1.

2012–13 Season

The Terriers rolled into the 12–13 season with a 7–1–0 start in the first month, with the lone loss coming in the form of another sting from Cornell, a 5–2 loss played in Agganis Arena. BU would get revenge in the following game, 5–1. The Terriers proceeded to go undefeated in Walter Brown in the new year, ending their regular season with an impressive 8-game win streak. BU proceeded to trounce Providence 4–0 in the Hockey East Semifinals and Northeastern 5–2 in the Hockey East Championship Game to repeat as champions, BU's third total. Junior Kerrin Sperry was selected as MVP, holding the record for fewest goals allowed in the Hockey East Tournament with three goals over three appearances.

BU went on to roll past Clarkson 5–3 at Walter Brown Arena in the NCAA quarterfinal game, advancing to the Frozen Four for the second time in program history. BU decisively beat Mercyhurst 4–1 to advance to its second NCAA Championship game, this time versus host Minnesota. Minnesota came into the game with the league's only perfect season and though the Terriers put up a valiant effort against the unstoppable Golden Gophers, BU dropped the championship game 6–3. Freshman Sarah Lefort, Senior Jenelle Kohanchuk, and Junior Olympian Marie-Philip Poulin all tallied goals against Minnesota's Noora Räty. The Terriers ended their season at 28–6–3, the team's fewest losses so far as a varsity team.

2011–12 Season

Fresh off their loss in the Frozen Four championship game, the Terriers went 5–3–1 in the first month of play, suffering two more losses to defending champions Wisconsin. BU would lose in overtime 4–3 to Northeastern for the Beanpot Final, keeping the Terriers Beanpot-less as a varsity team. However, the Terriers would make their mark on the postseason in an outstanding fashion. BU clinched its second Hockey East championship with a thrilling comeback, a 2–1 2OT win over Providence College. Senior Jennifer Wakefield tied the game 1–1 with 7.3 seconds left in the third period. Wakefield scored again two minutes into the second overtime period to win the game and clinch the Terriers' third NCAA tournament appearance.

The postseason saga continued as the No. 5 Terriers faced Cornell in the NCAA quarterfinal game. BU shot out of the gate with three straight goals, and the teams stood at 3–1 at the end of the first period. However, Cornell came out swinging in the second and quickly took a 7–4 lead by the midpoint of the third period. Not to be outdone, the Terriers scored three straight power play goals in the final 10 minutes of regulation to tie the game at 7–7. The teams would go on to play nearly 60 additional minutes of hockey, shattering the record for the longest NCAA Quarterfinal game ever played. Sophomore goaltender Kerrin Sperry would hold off the onslaught of Cornell shots in a spectacular performance, but could not stop a shot sneaked by from Cornell's Lauriane Rougeau. BU ended their season with a heartbreaking 8–7 3OT loss for a season record of 23–14–1.

2010–11 Season

Early in the 2010–11 season, the Terriers made club history. On October 2, Olympic gold medallist Marie-Philip Poulin scored a goal for Boston University in her first NCAA game. The following day, BU defeated North Dakota by a 6–2 mark. It signified the first time in program history that the Terriers defeated an opponent from the WCHA. With her third shorthanded goal of the season on October 15, freshman Marie-Philip Poulin tied BU's single-season record for shorthanded tallies in just four games. She led all NCAA freshmen in goals (9) and points per game (2.00) during October 2010. In addition, she led all Hockey East freshmen in goals, assists and points, and ranked during the month. She was ranked first among all Hockey East players in shorthanded goals with three. In the first seven games of her NCAA career, she had a seven-game point-scoring streak consisting of nine goals and seven assists.

In the first half of the 2010–11 season, freshman Kerrin Sperry collected three shutouts and became the first Terrier netminder to record back-to-back shutouts. She accomplished the feat after blanking Connecticut, 4–0, on Dec. 4 and the Northeastern Huskies, 3–0, on Dec. 7. On January 16, 2011, the Terriers defeated Maine and set a program record with their 11th home win of the season. The previous mark was 10 wins during the 2006–07 season. On January 22, 2011, Poulin recorded a hat trick, including two power play goals as BU prevailed over Vermont in a 4–0 win. The win was the Terriers 100th win in program history. Poulin broke BU's single-season points record with her second goal of the game and later tied the single-season goals record with her third marker. The Terriers would lose the Hockey East Semifinal game to Northeastern 2–4, but were high enough ranked nationally to move on to the NCAA quarterfinal round.

On March 18, 2011, Jillian Kirchner and junior Jenelle Kohanchuk scored in a 50-second span, as the Terriers advanced to the final of the 2011 NCAA Women's Division I Ice hockey Tournament. Kirchner's goal was the game winner as the Terriers improved to 27–6–4 and became the first Hockey East school to advance to the national title game. At season's end, Catherine Ward was the first ever Terrier to be named an All-American, as she was selected for the second team. In the Frozen Four championship, Marie-Philip Poulin was the only player who scored a goal as the Terriers fell by a 4–1 score to Wisconsin.

2009–10 Season

Having advanced to and lost the second consecutive Hockey East tournament, the Terriers began their 09–10 season hungry for the postseason. The season featured BU's record-high of 12 ties, but a new record low of 9 losses. On March 8, 2010, sophomore Tara Watchorn scored at 9:52 in overtime as the Number 3 seeded Terriers triumphed over No. 5 seed University of Connecticut at Providence College. The Terriers clinched their first ever Hockey East Tournament title and earned a spot in the NCAA Tournament. The 2010 Hockey East Tournament Championship game was the first ever to go into overtime in the eight-year history of the league. Though the Terriers would go on to lose to Mercyhurst 4–1, their advance to the NCAA tournament would mark an importance milestone in the Terrier's history and their place in the NCAA.

2008–09 Season

The 08–09 season marked a turning point for Boston University and its ascension into the national rankings. Going 5–2–2 in the first month of play, the Terriers were ranked No. 5 in the USCHO.com national poll. This was the first season the Terriers were ranked nationally, indicating faith in the program's stability and talent. The season featured another foray into the postseason, where BU would advance into the Hockey East Semifinals, losing to Boston College 2–1. They closed out the season at 18–11–7 season, the fewest losses so far.

2007–08 Season

Now an established team in Hockey East, the Terriers vied to prove themselves within the league. Unfortunately, the 07–08 season was off to a rough start, as they went 0–4–2 in the first month of play. The season featured the first matchups between the Terriers and the Western Collegiate Hockey Association, the reigning champions of the NCAA Tournament. In an aggressive game, the Terriers tied the University of North Dakota 2–2. The Terriers would go on to win the WCHA customary shootout. In the following game, the Terriers dropped a 4–2 decision to the University of Minnesota, marking the beginning of the rivalry between BU and Minnesota. The Terriers would get another shot at the Beanpot Championship, but lost at home to Harvard, 3–1. 07–08 saw the Terrier's first postseason appearance in the Hockey East Semifinals. BU was shut out by the University of New Hampshire 8–0 to end their season at 15–17–3.

2006–07 Season

The Terrier's second varsity season opened with a bang, going 7–1–0 in the first month of play. They got their first taste of the Beanpot Championship on Feb. 13, 2007 but lost 6–1 to host Boston College. They closed out their season at 19–12–3.

2005–06 Season

Boston University Women's Ice Hockey played its inaugural game on Oct. 7, 2005, a 4–3 loss to Northeastern University. Caroline Boudreau scored the first goal in BU program history. In the same game, Gina Kearns scored the first shorthanded goal in Terriers history. The Terriers would go on to have a 12–17–4 record for their first season as a D-I hockey team.

Pre-2005-06 Season

In 1974–1975 BU Women's Ice Hockey began as a club team of commuter and on-campus girls. They played local New England Colleges and local women's hockey teams from the community. Dana Sennett was the first coach with assistance from the men's Championship hockey team. It was elevated to NCAA in 2005. The 1980–81 club team won BU's first women's Beanpot trophy. The 2001–2002 club team reached the ACHA national semifinals.

== Season-by-season results ==
Won championship	Lost championship	Conference champions	League leader

Season	Coach	W	L	T	Conference	Conf. W	Conf. L	Conf. T	Finish	Conference Tournament	NCAA Tournament
2025-26	Tara Watchorn	11	21	3	Hockey East	8	14	2	8th HE	Won Opening Round vs. Providence (3-0) Lost Quarterfinals vs. Northeastern (1–2 2OT)	Did not qualify
2024–25	Tara Watchorn	24	12	2	Hockey East	18	7	2	2nd HE	Won Quarterfinals vs. Vermont (4–3 OT); Won Semifinals vs. Boston College (3–2 2OT); Won Championship vs. Northeastern (3–2 OT)	Lost Regional Semifinal vs. Clarkson (1–3)
2023–24	Tara Watchorn	14	18	3	Hockey East	12	14	1	7th HE	Lost Opening Round vs. Holy Cross (2–4)	Did not qualify
2022–23	Brian Durocher	11	20	3	Hockey East	9	15	3	7th HE	Lost Opening Round vs. Merrimack (4–5 OT)	Did not qualify
2021–22	Brian Durocher	12	15	6	Hockey East	11	9	5	6th HE	Lost Quarterfinals vs. Connecticut (1–3)	Did not qualify
2020–21	Brian Durocher	6	6	0	Hockey East	6	5	0	6th HE	Lost Quarterfinals vs. Providence (3–4)	Did not qualify
2019–20	Brian Durocher	24	8	4	Hockey East	18	6	3	2nd HE	Lost Quarterfinals vs. Maine (2–3, 1–2)	Did not qualify
2018–19	Brian Durocher	21	8	8	Hockey East	15	6	6	3rd HE	Won Quarterfinals vs. New Hampshire (5–1, 3–1); Lost Semifinals vs. Boston College (1–5)	Did not qualify
2017–18	Brian Durocher	14	17	6	Hockey East	8	11	5	6th HE	Lost Quarterfinals vs. Maine (2–3, 4–1, 3–4 OT)	Did not qualify
2016–17	Brian Durocher	19	12	6	Hockey East	12	8	4	3rd HE	Won Quarterfinals vs. New Hampshire (2–4, 4–3, 3–2); Lost Semifinals vs. Northeastern (1–2)	Did not qualify
2015–16	Brian Durocher	23	14	2	Hockey East	17	5	2	3rd HE	Won Quarterfinals vs. Vermont (3–0, 2–4, 6–1); Won Semifinals vs. Northeastern (4–3); Lost Championship vs. Boston College (0–5)	Did not qualify
2014–15	Brian Durocher	25	9	3	Hockey East	15	5	1	2nd HE	Won Quarterfinals vs. Vermont (8–1, 7–2); Won Semifinals vs. Northeastern (6–1); Won Championship vs. Boston College (4–1)	Lost First Round vs. Wisconsin (1–5)
2013–14	Brian Durocher	24	13	1	Hockey East	14	7	0	2nd HE	Won Quarterfinals vs. Providence (3–2); Won Semifinals vs. Northeastern (3–2); Won Championship vs. Boston College (3–2)	Lost First Round vs. Minnesota (1–5)
2012–13	Brian Durocher	28	6	3	Hockey East	18	2	1	1st HE	Won Quarterfinals vs. Connecticut (5–1); Won Semifinals vs. Providence (4–0); Won Championship vs. Northeastern (5–2)	Won First Round vs. Clarkson (5–3); Won Frozen Four vs. Mercyhurst (4–1); Lost Championship vs. Minnesota (3–6)
2011–12	Brian Durocher	23	14	1	Hockey East	14	7	0	3rd HE	Won Quarterfinals vs. New Hampshire (9–1); Won Semifinals vs. Boston College (5–2); Won Championship vs. Providence (2–1 OT)	Won First Round vs. Providence (2–1 OT); Lost Frozen Four vs. Cornell (7–8 3OT)
2010–11	Brian Durocher	27	7	4	Hockey East	15	3	3	1st HE	Lost Semifinals vs. Northeastern (2–4)	Won First Round vs. Mercyhurst (4–2); Won Frozen Four vs. Cornell (4–2); Lost Championship vs. Wisconsin (1–4)
2009–10	Brian Durocher	17	9	12	Hockey East	10	6	5	3rd HE	Won Quarterfinals vs. Boston College (3–1); Won Semifinals vs. New Hampshire (4–0); Won Championship vs. Connecticut (2–1 OT)	Lost First Round vs. Mercyhurst (1–4)
2008–09	Brian Durocher	18	11	7	Hockey East	10	6	5	3rd HE	Won Quarterfinals vs. Northeastern (2–1); Lost Semifinals vs. Boston College (2–3)	Did not qualify
2007–08	Brian Durocher	15	17	3	Hockey East	11	9	1	3rd HE	Lost Semifinals vs. New Hampshire (0–8)	Did not qualify
2006–07	Brian Durocher	19	12	3	Hockey East	10	9	2	5th HE	Did not qualify	Did not qualify
2005–06	Brian Durocher	12	17	4	Hockey East	6	13	2	6th HE	Did not qualify	Did not qualify

== Current roster ==
As of September 11, 2022.

No.	Nat.	Player	Class	Pos	Height	DoB	Hometown	Previous team
2		Alex Allan	Graduate	D	5' 8" (1.73 m)	2000-08-30	Abbotsford, British Columbia	Pacific Steelers
3		Liv Haag	Sophomore	F	5' 1" (1.55 m)	2003-06-30	Robbinsdale, Minnesota	Benilde-St. Margaret's
6		Nadia Mattivi (C)	Senior	D	5' 9" (1.75 m)	2000-05-02	Baselga di Piné, Trento, Italy	Alleghe Hockey
7		Kylie Roberts	Sophomore	F	5' 8" (1.73 m)	2003-04-21	Edina, Minnesota	Edina High School
8		Maggie Hanzel	Sophomore	D	5' 9" (1.75 m)	2002-08-14	Rochester, Minnesota	Rochester Lourdes High School
9		Clare O'Leary	Junior	F	5' 8" (1.73 m)	2001-02-15	Hingham, Massachusetts	Tabor Academy
10		Jesse DeVito	Graduate	F	5' 6" (1.68 m)	1999-07-09	Rumson, New Jersey	University of Wisconsin
11		Sydney Healey	Freshman	F	5' 7" (1.7 m)	2004-09-06	Arthur, Ontario	Burlington Jr. Barracudas
13		Andi Calderone	Junior	D	5' 6" (1.68 m)	2001-02-12	Kirkland, Quebec	John Abbott College
16		Julia Nearis	Senior	F	5' 9" (1.75 m)	1999-08-31	Beverly, Massachusetts	Kent School
17		Lacey Martin (A)	Junior	F	5' 8" (1.73 m)	2002-01-03	Minnetonka, Minnesota	Minnetonka High School
18		Haylee Blinkhorn	Senior	F	5' 4" (1.63 m)	2000-07-31	Oakdale, Minnesota	Hill-Murray School
19		Clara Yuhn	Freshman	F	5' 9" (1.75 m)	2004-03-27	Bloomfield Hills, Michigan	Little Caesars
20		Julia Shaunessy	Junior	D	6' 1" (1.85 m)	2002-05-03	Marshfield, Massachusetts	Tabor Academy
21		Madison Cardaci (A)	Junior	D	5' 9" (1.75 m)	2002-04-18	Westminster, Massachusetts	Williston Northampton School
22		Christina Vote	Sophomore	F	5' 2" (1.57 m)	2002-02-28	Arlington, Massachusetts	Dexter Southfield School
23		Tamara Giaquinto	Junior	D	5' 6" (1.68 m)	2002-03-29	Toronto, Ontario	Etobicoke Jr. Dolphins
24		Maeve Kelly	Freshman	D	5' 9" (1.75 m)	2004-03-27	Victoria, Minnesota	Holy Family Catholic High School
25		Ani FitzGerald	Junior	F	5' 7" (1.7 m)	2001-08-23	Shaker Heights, Ohio	Northeastern University
26		Brooke Ersoy	Senior	F	5' 10" (1.78 m)	2001-08-07	Arlington Heights, Illinois	Chicago Mission
27		Brooke Disher	Freshman	D	5' 6" (1.68 m)	2004-07-14	Fort St. John, British Columbia	Rink Hockey Academy Kelowna
28		Catherine Foulem	Junior	F	5' 6" (1.68 m)	2002-05-06	Dieppe, New Brunswick	Ridley College
33		Allie Cuellar	Freshman	G	5' 4" (1.63 m)	2004-01-24	St. Charles, Illinois	North American Hockey Academy
37		Callie Shanahan	Sophomore	G	5' 10" (1.78 m)	2003-05-26	Commerce, Michigan	HoneyBaked
40		Andrea Braendli	Graduate	G	5' 6" (1.68 m)	1997-06-05	Kloten, Switzerland	Ohio State University

== Awards and honors ==
- Abby Cook, 2019 WHEA All Star First Team
- Sammy Davis, 2019 WHEA All Star First Team
- Sammy Davis, 2020 Sarah Devens Award
- Corinne Schroeder, 2019 WHEA Second-Team All-Star
- Victoria Bach, 2015 Hockey East Second Team All-Star
- Victoria Bach, 2014 Pro Ambition Rookie of the Year
- Rebecca Leslie, 2015 Hockey East Second Team All-Star
- Alexis Crossley, 2015 Hockey East Honorable Mention All-Star
- Melissa Anderson, 2010 WHEA Second-Team All-Star
- Melissa Anderson, 2010 Frozen Four Skills Competition participant
- Kasey Boucher, 2010 WHEA Honorable Mention All-Star
- Kasey Boucher, 2010 Hockey East Sportsmanship Award
- Jill Cardella – Runner up, 2010 Hockey East Rookie of the Year
- Jill Cardella, 2010 WHEA All-Rookie Team
- Kaleigh Fratkin, 2013–14 New England Division I All-Star
- Kaleigh Fratkin, 2013–14 Hockey East First-Team All-Star
- Melissa Haber, 2010 Frozen Four Skills Competition participant
- Jillian Kirchner, Hockey Player of the Week (Week of October 5, 2009)
- Ashley Leichliter, 2010 Turfer Athletic Award
- MacKenna Parker, Hockey East All-Rookie Team (2018–19)
- Marie-Philip Poulin, Hockey East Pure Hockey Player of the Week (Week of October 18, 2010) 2011 New England Women's Division I All-Star Team, Hockey East All-Rookie Team, Hockey East Rookie of the Year, 2012 Hockey East All-Tournament Team, 2013 Hockey East First Team All-Star, New England Division I All-Star, Frozen Four All-Tournament Team, 2015 Division I First Team All-American, Hockey East First All-Star Team
- Kerrin Sperry, Hockey East Goaltender of the Month (December 2010)
- Jenn Wakefield, Hockey East Pure Hockey Player of the Month (December 2010)
- Tara Watchorn, 2010 WHEA Second-Team All-Star
- Tara Watchorn, 2010 New England Hockey Writers All-Star Team

=== All-American ===
- Catherine Ward, Second Team All-American
- Victoria Bach, 2017–18 First Team All-America

=== Hockey East player of the month ===
- Marie-Philip Poulin, Hockey East Player of the Month (February 2015)
- Marie-Philip Poulin, Hockey East Player of the Month (January 2015)

=== Hockey East rookie of the month ===
- Victoria Bach, Hockey East Rookie of the Month (February 2015)
- Jill Cardella, Bauer Rookie of the Month, November 2009
- Rebecca Leslie, Hockey East Rookie of the Month (October 2014)
- Marie-Philip Poulin, Hockey East Rookie of the Month (October 2010)
- Marie-Philip Poulin, 2010–11 Hockey East Rookie of the Year
- Kerrin Sperry, Hockey East Co-Rookie of the Month, November 2010

=== Hockey East team of the week ===
- Hockey East Team of the Week (Week of November 8, 2010)
- Hockey East Team of the Week (Week of December 13, 2010)

=== Hockey East All-Tournament Team ===
- Melissa Anderson, F: 2010 Women's Hockey East All-Tournament Team
- Melissa Haber, G: 2010 Women's Hockey East All-Tournament Team
- Melissa Haber, 2010 Women's Hockey East Tournament Most Valuable Player
- Tara Watchorn, D: 2010 Women's Hockey East All-Tournament Team
- Jenn Wakefield, F: 2011 Hockey East All-Tournament team
- Marie-Philip Poulin, F: 2012 2012 Hockey East All-Tournament Team

=== HCA Awards ===
- Corinne Schroeder, Hockey Commissioners Association Women's Goaltender of the Month (December 2019)

== Terriers in professional hockey ==
= CWHL All-Star	= PHF All-Star	= Clarkson Cup Champion	= Isobel Cup Champion	= Walter Cup Champion

Player	Position	Team(s)	League(s)	Clarkson Cup	Isobel Cup	Walter Cup
Victoria Bach	Forward	Markham Thunder; Dream Gap Tour; Toronto Sceptres; Ottawa Charge	CWHL; PWHPA; PWHL			
Anya Battaglino	Defense	Boston Blades; Connecticut Whale	CWHL; PHF	1 (2015)		
Andrea Brändli	Goaltender	MoDo Hockey; Detroit Clutch	SDHL; PWHL			
Jordan Brickner	Forward	Ladies Team Lugano; DEC Salzburg Eagles; Connecticut Whale	Swiss National League; DEBL; PHF			
Jill Cardella	Forward	Boston Blades	CWHL	1		
Jesse Compher	Forward	Toronto Sceptres; Detroit Clutch	PWHL			
Abby Cook	Defense	Minnesota Frost; Boston Fleet	PWHL			
Sammy Davis	Forward	Boston Pride first pick in 2020 PHF Draft; Boston Fleet; Ottawa Charge	PHF; PWHL		2 (2021, 2022)	
Shannon Doyle	Defense	Connecticut Whale team captain 2019–21	PHF			
Kaleigh Fratkin	Defense	Boston Blades; Connecticut Whale; Boston Pride; Boston Fleet	CWHL; PHF; PWHL	1 (2015)	2 (2021, 2022)	
Tamara Giaquinto	Defense	Montréal Victoire	PWHL			1 (2026)
Jillian Kirchner	Forward	Boston Blades	CWHL			
Rebecca Leslie	Forward	Calgary Inferno; Toronto Sceptres; Ottawa Charge	CWHL; PWHL	1 (2019)		
Holly Lorms	Forward	Boston Blades	CWHL			
Nadia Mattivi	Defense	Montréal Victoire	PWHL			1 (2026)
Isabel Menard	Forward	Lugano; ZSC Lions Frauen	SWHL			
Savannah Newton	Forward	Brynäs IF; Linköping HC	SDHL			
Marie-Philip Poulin	Forward	Canadiennes de Montreal; Dream Gap Tour; Montréal Victoire	CWHL; PWHL	2 (2009 and 2017)		1 (2026)
Victoria Hanson	Goaltender	Boston Pride	PHF		2 (2021, 2022)	
Sarah Lefort	Forward	Canadiennes de Montreal; Montréal Victoire	CWHL; PWHL			
Mary Parker	Forward	Boston Pride	PHF		2 (2021, 2022)	
Rebecca Russo	Forward	Metropolitan Riveters	PHF		1 (2018)	
Reagan Rust	Forward	Team New England; AIK Hockey Dam; Metropolitan Riveters	PWHPA; Swedish Women's Hockey League; PHF			
Corinne Schroeder	Goaltender	Boston Pride; New York Sirens; Seattle Torrent; San Jose Sea Lions	PHF; PWHL			
Callie Shanahan	Goaltender	New York Sirens	PWHL			
Sarah Steele	Defense	EHV Sabres Wien; Neuchâtel Hockey Academy; KMH Budapest; Toronto Six	EWHL; SWHL; EWHL; PHF			
Jennifer Wakefield	Forward	Toronto Furies; Linköping HC; Luleå HF; Brynäs IF; Djurgårdens IF	CWHL; SDHL			
Catherine Ward	Defense	Montreal Stars	CWHL	1 (2012)		
Louise Warren	Defense	Calgary Inferno	CWHL	2 (2016 and 2019)		
Tara Watchorn	Defense	Boston Blades	CWHL	1 (2015)		
Dakota Woodworth	Forward	Boston Blades; Calgary Inferno	CWHL	1 (2019)		

=== Olympians ===
Player	Position	Team	Event(s)
Andrea Brändli	Goaltender	Switzerland	Ice hockey at the 2026 Winter Olympics – Women's tournament
Nadia Mattivi	Defense	Italy	Ice hockey at the 2026 Winter Olympics – Women's tournament
Marie-Philip Poulin	Forward	Canada	2010, 2014, 2018, 2022, Ice hockey at the 2026 Winter Olympics – Women's tournament
Kayla Tutino	Forward	Italy	Ice hockey at the 2026 Winter Olympics – Women's tournament
Jennifer Wakefield	Forward	Canada	2014, Ice hockey at the 2018 Winter Olympics – Women's tournament
Lilli Welcke	Forward	Germany	Ice hockey at the 2026 Winter Olympics – Women's tournament
Luisa Welcke	Forward	Germany	Ice hockey at the 2026 Winter Olympics – Women's tournament

== See also ==
- List of college women ice hockey coaches with 250 wins
- Boston University Terriers men's ice hockey
