= Corinne Schroeder =

Canadian ice hockey player (born 1999)

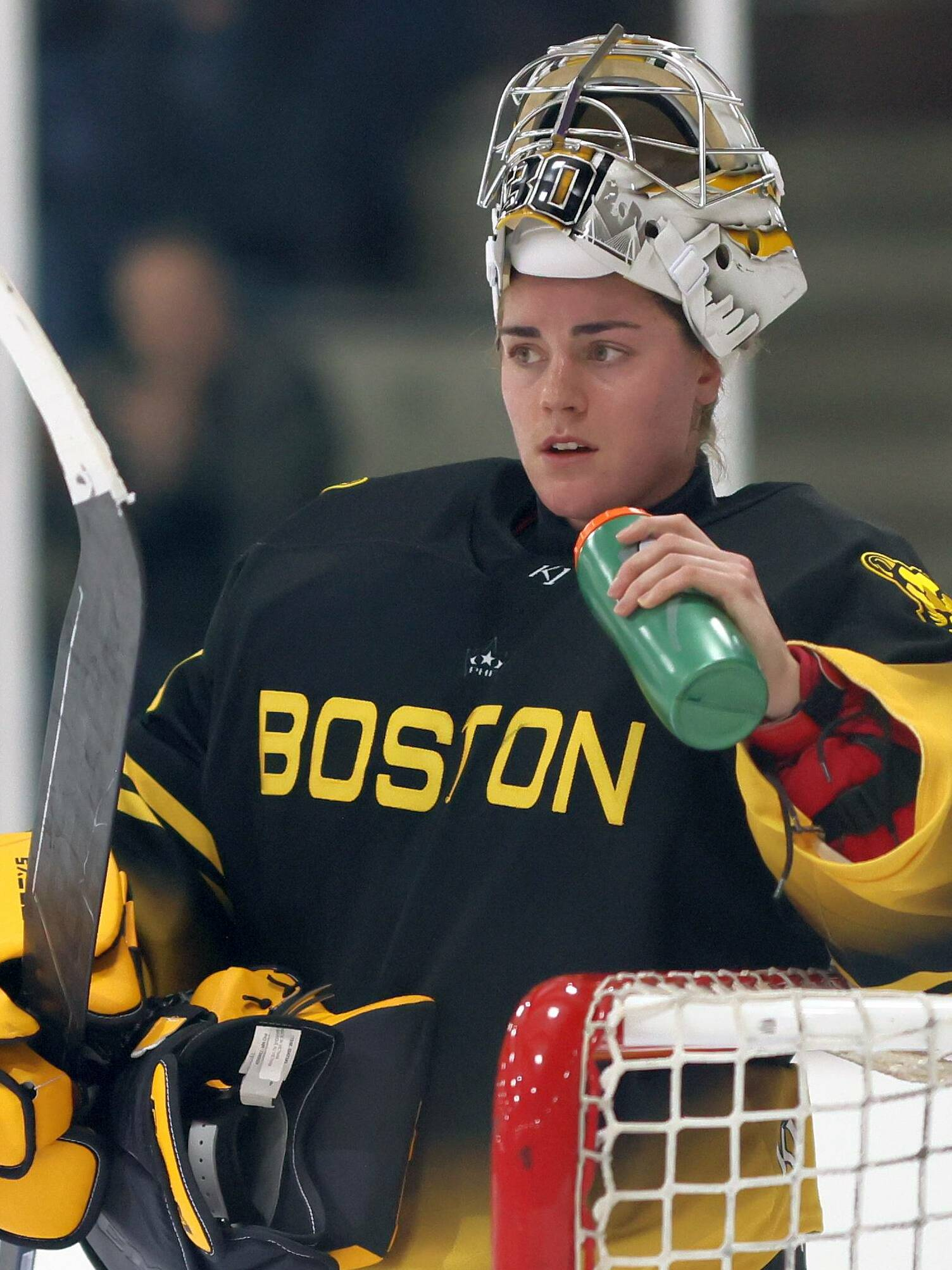
- Schroeder with the Boston Pride in 2022
- Born: August 17, 1999 (age 27) Elm Creek, Manitoba, Canada
- Height: 5 ft 11 in (180 cm)
- Position: Goaltender
- Catches: Left
- PWHL team Former teams: San Jose Sea Lions; Boston Pride; New York Sirens; Seattle Torrent
- Playing career: 2017–present

Corinne Schroeder (born August 17, 1999) is a Canadian professional ice hockey goaltender for the San Jose Sea Lions of the Professional Women's Hockey League (PWHL), having previously played for the Seattle Torrent and New York Sirens of the PWHL, and the Boston Pride of the Premier Hockey Federation (PHF). A standout collegiate goaltender, she played college ice hockey for Boston University and Quinnipiac University, where she set program records for save percentage and goals against average and earned All-American honors.

During the 2022–23 PHF season with the Boston Pride, she set a league record by recording three consecutive shutouts to open her rookie campaign and went on to win both PHF Goaltender of the Year and Rookie of the Year. She then joined the PWHL, being selected 33rd overall by PWHL New York in the inaugural 2023 PWHL Draft, and made history by recording the first-ever shutout in the league’s inaugural game on January 1, 2024, against PWHL Toronto. She finished her first PWHL season with a .930 save percentage and was nominated for the 2024 PWHL Goaltender of the Year award.

In the 2024–25 PWHL season, she led all goaltenders with four shutouts, bringing her career regular‑season total to five and setting a PWHL record for most shutouts by a goaltender. She made her senior national team debut with Team Canada during the 2023–24 Rivalry Series against the United States in November 2023.

== Early life ==
Corinne Schroeder was born on August 17, 1999, in Elm Creek, Manitoba, a local urban district in the Pembina Valley Region with a population of approximately 400 people, located about 50 kilometers west of Winnipeg. She grew up in the middle of five children on her family's 2,000-acre farm, where they farmed grain with her uncle and operated a chicken barn. Her father, Robert Schroeder, coached her for years and helped her get extra ice time at the community's volunteer-run natural ice surface, using his knowledge of farm machinery to clear and maintain the ice. She has three sisters and one brother; her younger sister Megan also played ice hockey as a goaltender at Balmoral Hall School before retiring from elite-level play in 2019 to focus on post-secondary education.

Schroeder switched to playing goaltender full-time when she was approximately 12 years old. In the 2013–14 season, she played with the Pembina Valley Hawks 19U AAA of the Manitoba Female Midget Hockey League (MFMHL) and Tier 1 Elite Hockey League (T1EHL). In grade 11, she began attending Balmoral Hall School in Winnipeg, where she joined the BH Blazers varsity prep hockey team competing in the Junior Women's Hockey League (JWHL). During the 2015–16 season at Balmoral Hall, Schroeder posted a .944 save percentage and 1.97 goals-against average in 21 games, followed by a .926 save percentage and 2.54 GAA in 15 games during the 2016–17 season. At Balmoral Hall, Schroeder played alongside future ZhHL champion Ryleigh Houston, future SDHL players Morgan Wabick and Taylor Wabick, and future PHF player Kaity Howarth. She also represented Team Manitoba at the 2016 National Women's Under-18 Championship.

Growing up, Schroeder modeled her game after Nashville Predators goaltender Pekka Rinne, whom she described as having "that perfect balance between technicality as well as athleticism, and he just kind of had that beautiful hybrid style."

== Playing career ==
=== Collegiate ===
==== Boston University (2017–2021) ====
Schroeder backstopped the Boston University Terriers women's ice hockey program in the Hockey East (HEA) conference of the NCAA Division I during the 2017–18 season to the 2020–21 season. She made marked improvement over each of her first three seasons, increasing her save percentage (SV%) and reducing her goals against average (GAA) from a respectable .913 SV% and 2.51 GAA as a freshman to an excellent .933 SV% and 1.90 GAA as a sophomore to a program record-setting .954 SV% and 1.54 GAA as a junior.

As a freshman in 2017–18, Schroeder started all 25 games and was named to the Hockey East All-Rookie Team. She earned Hockey East Defensive Player of the Week honors on November 20, 2017. In her sophomore season (2018–19), Schroeder started all 32 games and was named Hockey East Third Team All-Star. She was named AHCA National Goaltender of the Month and Hockey East Goaltender of the Month for December 2018 after posting a .964 save percentage—best among Division I goalies with at least two starts—and a 1.02 GAA en route to a 3–0–1 record. She earned Hockey East Defensive Player of the Week honors four times during the season (November 19, 2018; January 7, 14, and February 18, 2019). Schroeder earned her first postseason victory with 25 saves in a 5–1 win over New Hampshire on March 1, followed by 27 saves in a 3–1 triumph over UNH on March 2. She was also named an AHCA All-American Scholar.

As a junior in 2019–20, Schroeder's record-setting .954 SV% and 1.54 GAA established new Boston University program records for a single season. She was named Hockey East Second Team All-Star and earned AHCA National Goaltender of the Month and Hockey East Goaltender of the Month honors for October 2019. She collected Hockey East Defensive Player of the Week recognition twice (October 21 and December 9, 2019). Notable performances included a 33-save shutout in a 4–0 triumph over Boston College in the Beanpot semifinal on February 4, a 21-save shutout in a 6–0 win over No. 8 BC on December 6, and 33 saves in a 1–0 win at New Hampshire on February 15. She recorded eight performances with 30 or more saves during the season. Schroeder was again named an AHCA All-American Scholar.

Her senior campaign in 2020–21 was cut short by the COVID-19 pandemic and she played just eight games in the heavily altered season, recording a .911 save percentage and 2.23 GAA. She was named to the National Goaltender of the Year Award Watch List and posted a 20-save shutout in a 1–0 win over Maine on January 7. Despite the challenges of the COVID-19-impacted season, Schroeder finished her four seasons with the best career save percentage and goals against average in Boston University Terriers women's ice hockey program history, a .929 SV% and 1.98 GAA across 91 games.

==== Quinnipiac University (2021–2022) ====
Presented with the opportunity to play a fifth year of NCAA college eligibility due to the COVID-19 pandemic, Schroeder selected to join the Quinnipiac Bobcats women's ice hockey program in the ECAC Hockey conference as a graduate student for the 2021–22 season. Her first start with the Bobcats came on September 25, 2021, a 5–1 victory against the Maine Black Bears. During the game, Schroeder made women's college ice hockey history as the first goaltender credited with a goal after the puck was misplayed by Maine into their own goal following a kick save by Schroeder.

The history-making debut set the tone for her season, during which she recorded six shutouts and finished with the third-best save percentage and sixth-best goals against average in the country; her .951 SV% set a single-season program record. She recorded a 15–8–2 overall record and posted a 1.44 goals against average, which ranked sixth in the country. In the home stretch of the season, she led the team through three straight wins against top-10 ranked Yale and Clarkson. Her incredible season earned top-three finalist selection for 2022 Women's Hockey Goalie of the Year, and she was named to the New England Division I All-Star Team, All-USCHO First Team, and Quinnipiac's Most Valuable Player.

Schroeder concluded her college ice hockey career playing in the 2022 NCAA women's ice hockey tournament, her first NCAA tournament. She earned a shutout in the first round against the Syracuse Orange in a 4–0 victory, the first NCAA tournament win and first shutout in Quinnipiac Bobcats program history. Facing the number one seeded Ohio State Buckeyes in the national quarterfinals, she made 73 saves in a Herculean effort that carried the Bobcats into double overtime before they ultimately fell to the Buckeyes. Prior to the national quarterfinals, her career high stops in a single game had been 42 saves. The 73-save game set a Quinnipiac Bobcats women's ice hockey program single-game record and ties for sixth in the NCAA Division I women's ice hockey all-time record book.

=== Professional ===
==== Boston Pride (2022–23) ====
In August 2022, the Boston Pride officially announced they had signed Schroeder for the 2022–23 PHF season—though the signing had been inadvertently leaked in late July via the rosters published by Hockey Canada for the Canadian national team selection camps for the 2022 IIHF Women's World Championship. Schroeder highlighted the season length, which would provide needed game experience, as a significant part of her decision to sign in the PHF. Regarding the opportunity to play at the professional level, Schroeder explained, "I would say this is what I've been working for my whole life... It's honestly a dream and one that I never really knew I could have growing up but now it's a reality."

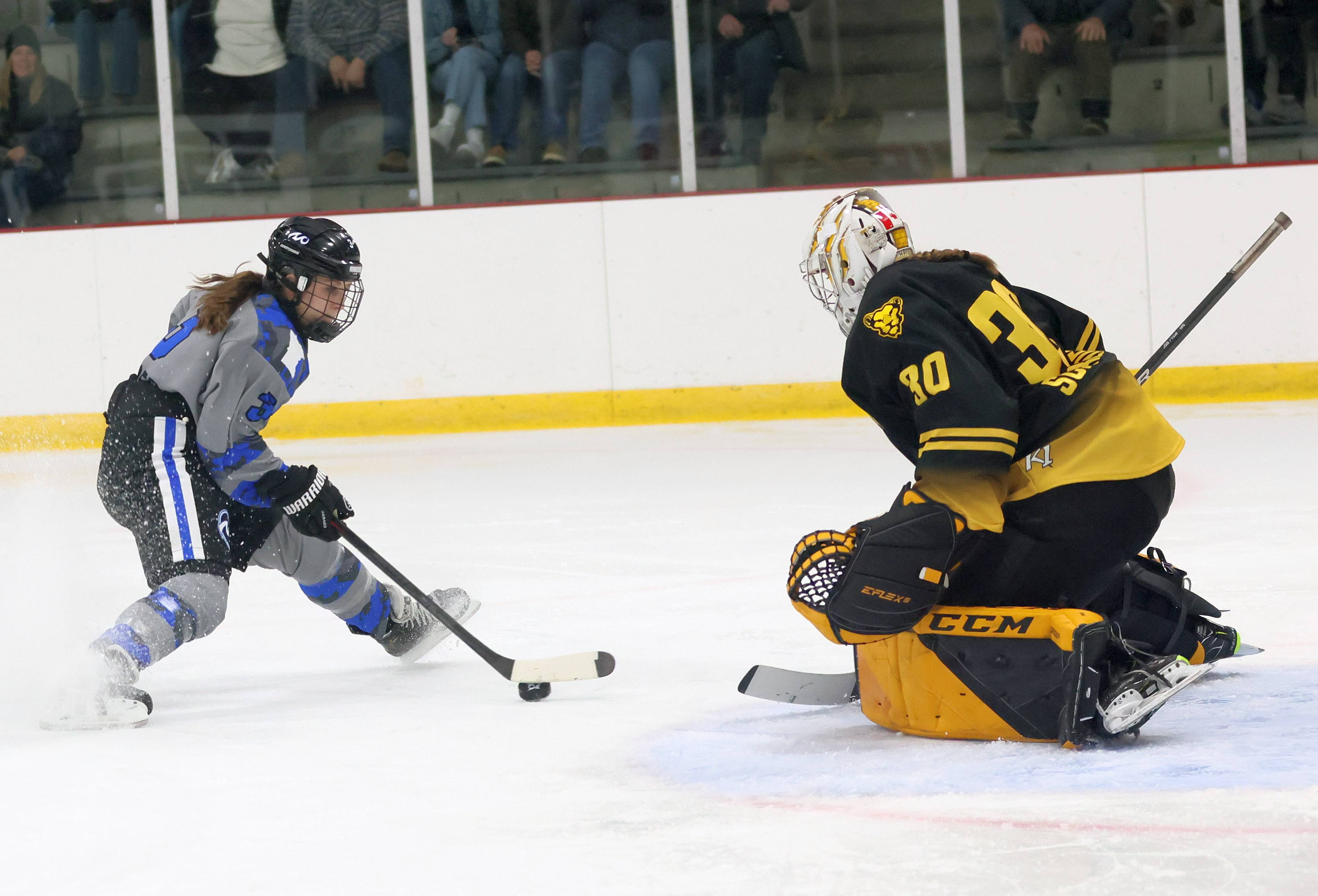
Schroeder defends in goal against Jonna Curtis of the Minnesota Whitecaps, November 2022

Schroeder made her professional debut on November 5, 2022, against the Connecticut Whale in a 4–0 victory, making 36 saves to become just the third goaltender in PHF history to post a shutout in their first career start. The following day, she recorded 27 saves in a 2–0 victory over the Metropolitan Riveters, becoming the sixth goaltender in PHF history to post back-to-back shutouts. On November 18, Schroeder recorded a third consecutive shutout with a 49-save performance in a 2–0 triumph over the Minnesota Whitecaps, setting a new PHF record for consecutive shutouts to start a season. Her shutout streak lasted a total of 183 minutes and 15 seconds across three different opponents. For her performance in November, Schroeder was named PHF Player of the Month. On December 11, 2022, Schroeder stopped all 25 shots to set a new PHF single-season record with her fourth shutout in just seven starts for the first-place Pride. She was named to the PHF All-Star Game, which was held on January 29, 2023, in Toronto, as a member of Team Canada.

Schroeder concluded her rookie season with a historic performance, setting three PHF single-season records: 19 wins, seven shutouts (shattering the previous mark of three), and 761 total saves. Her overall record of 19–1–1 was compiled over a franchise-record 22 starts and helped the Pride finish in first place in the league's regular season standings. She led the PHF with a 1.67 goals-against average and .955 save percentage. For her outstanding rookie campaign, Schroeder was awarded both the PHF Rookie of the Year and PHF Goaltender of the Year honors. PHF Director of League and Hockey Operations Mel Davidson stated, "What impressed me about Corinne's season, beyond the statistics and records, was her consistency throughout the year, especially playing as many games as she did and how often it included back-to-back starts. She has great size that she uses to her advantage in her stance and positioning. Most of all, her play exuded confidence which allowed her team to play freely knowing that she was a dependable last line of defense." She was also a finalist for PHF Most Valuable Player (selected by the Professional Hockey Writers Association) and Outstanding Player of the Year (voted by PHF Players' Association members). Schroeder's GAA and save percentage ranked first among all PHF goaltenders with 10 or more career starts, while her seven shutouts were one shy of the league's all-time mark of eight.

==== New York Sirens (2023–25) ====
On September 18, 2023, Schroeder was selected in the sixth round, 33rd overall, by PWHL New York in the 2023 PWHL draft. Schroeder made history in the PWHL's inaugural game on January 1, 2024, recording the first-ever PWHL shutout with 29 saves in a 4–0 victory over PWHL Toronto at Mattamy Athletic Centre before more than 2,500 fans in attendance and nearly three million watching from home. Her teammates nicknamed her "brick wall" for her consistently focused performance. During the season, Schroeder played 15 games and averaged 31 saves per game, the highest figure in the PWHL. She recorded 30 or more saves in nine of her 15 starts, including two career-high performances of 39 saves on January 14 and February 4, both of which resulted in overtime victories for her team. She finished the season with a .930 save percentage (second-best in the league), tied for fourth in wins with seven, and posted a 2.40 goals-against average.

For her performance, Schroeder was voted as one of three finalists for the 2024 PWHL Goaltender of the Year Award. She signed a two-year contract extension with New York on June 11, 2024, becoming the first player to officially re-sign with the team that offseason. New York General Manager Pascal Daoust commented, "Beyond her physical presence and athleticism, her relentless determination to improve every day on and off the ice and become the best version of herself makes her a key player in our pursuit of excellence and championship."

In the 2024–25 PWHL season, with the team now branded as the New York Sirens, Schroeder played 20 games and recorded 10 wins, eight losses, one overtime loss, and one shootout loss. She posted a 2.43 goals-against average and .919 save percentage. Schroeder became the first goaltender in PWHL history to record four shutouts in a single season, surpassing Toronto's Kristen Campbell, who had three during the inaugural campaign. She also became the first goaltender to post back-to-back shutouts twice in the same season. Her first pair of consecutive shutouts came on January 4 (26 saves vs Minnesota) and January 12 (28 saves vs Toronto in a 1–0 overtime victory), making her the first goaltender to post back-to-back shutouts during the PWHL regular season. The January 12 game marked the first time in PWHL regular-season history that a game ended 0–0 in regulation. Her second pair came on April 1 (shutout vs Montreal) and April 27 (33 saves vs Minnesota), with the latter representing the most saves in a shutout performance during the season.

Schroeder set the PWHL record for longest shutout streak at 178 minutes and 16 seconds (December 29, 2024 – January 15, 2025). Her shutout streak of 128 minutes and 33 seconds in April was the third-longest of the season. With her league-record five career regular-season shutouts across two seasons, Schroeder ranks third all-time in saves with 1,005. During the league's expansion to eight teams ahead of the 2025–26 PWHL season, Schroeder was left unprotected by the Sirens and signed a two-year contract with PWHL Seattle on June 6, 2025. Seattle General Manager Meghan Tuner stated, "Signing Corinne is a huge step for our team. With four shutouts this season, more than anyone in the league, she's shown she can take over a game and deliver when it matters most. She brings poise, confidence, and the kind of elite goaltending every team needs to win."

==== Seattle Torrent (2025–2026) ====
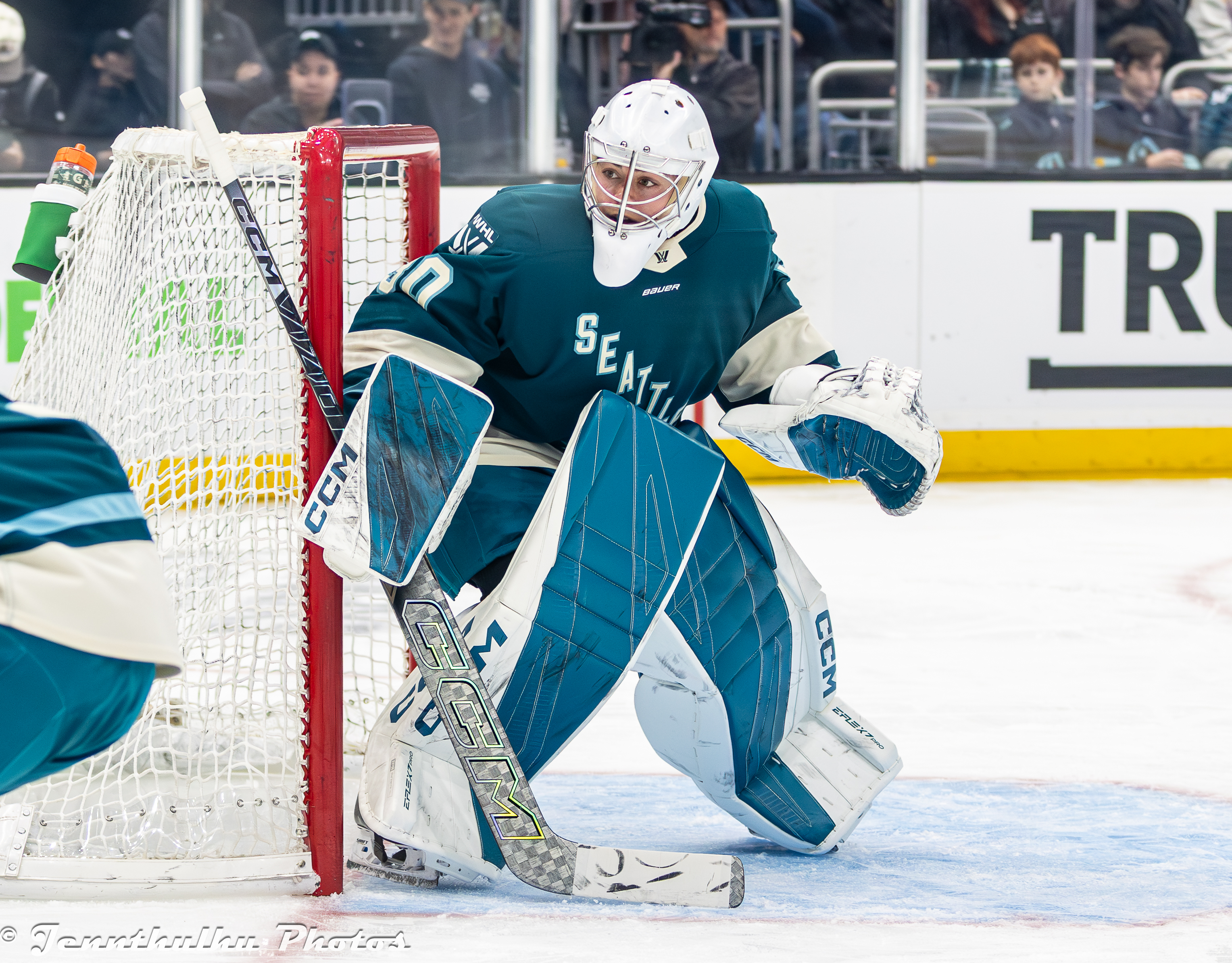
Shroeder during a game against Minnesota Frost, November 2025

Schroeder joined the Seattle Torrent for the team's inaugural 2025–26 PWHL season after signing a two-year contract on June 6, 2025. She was one of five players signed during the league's exclusive signing window for expansion teams, alongside Hilary Knight, Alex Carpenter, Cayla Barnes, and Danielle Serdachny.

Schroeder started Seattle's first two games of the season, including the franchise's inaugural game on November 21, 2025, a 4–3 overtime loss to the Vancouver Goldeneyes before a sold-out crowd of 14,958 at Pacific Coliseum in Vancouver. She was in net for the team's inaugural home opener on November 28, 2025, at Climate Pledge Arena against the two-time defending Walter Cup champion Minnesota Frost. The game set a U.S. attendance record for professional women's hockey with 16,014 fans in attendance, surpassing the previous record of 14,288 set during the Detroit Takeover Tour stop on March 16, 2025. The attendance also marked the highest-attended primary home venue game in PWHL history. Schroeder made 22 saves in the 3–0 loss, though Seattle created numerous scoring chances throughout the game.

Following the home opener, Seattle head coach Steve O'Rourke implemented a goaltending tandem approach with Schroeder and Hannah Murphy, who earned her first PWHL career start on December 3 in Seattle's first franchise win, a 2–1 victory over the New York Sirens. Schroeder returned to the net on December 21 against the Boston Fleet, making impressive saves throughout the game despite a 3–1 loss, posting a season-high .921 save percentage on 38 shots. Schroeder has three career wins against the Montreal Victoire, tied for third-most in league history.

==== San Jose Sea Lions (2026–present) ====
On June 5, 2026, Schroeder became the first ever player signed by the San Jose Sea Lions, joining after being left unprotected by the Seattle Torrent during Phase Two of the league's Expansion Roster Distribution Process. She was signed through the 2027–28 season.

=== International ===
As a member of the Canadian national under-18 team, Schroeder won a silver medal at the 2017 IIHF U18 Women's World Championship. Schroeder was invited to the Hockey Canada National Women's Development Team Summer Camps in 2020, 2021, and 2022, and has also participated in a number of other national women's development team events, first in 2018.

Schroeder made her senior national team debut during the first leg of the 2023–24 Rivalry Series in November 2023. It was her first international experience with the senior team since representing Canada at the 2017 IIHF World Women's U18 Championship, where she won a silver medal as the third goaltender behind starters Danika Ranger and Édith D'Astous-Moreau. Schroeder was named to Canada's roster for the final three games of the 2023–24 Rivalry Series in February 2024.

== Personal life ==
Schroeder completed dual bachelor's degrees with honours at Boston University, earning both a BSc in health science (magna cum laude) from the College of Health and Rehabilitation Sciences (Sargent College) and a BA in psychology (cum laude). She holds an MBA from Quinnipiac University and has expressed interest in starting a physical-therapy practice after her playing career has ended.

== Career statistics ==
Note: GP = Games played; Min, TOI = Minutes played; W = Wins; L = Losses; T,T/OT = Ties; OTL = Overtime losses; GA = Goals-against; GAA = Goals-against average; SO = Shutouts; SV% = Save percentage;

			Regular season									Playoffs
Season	Team	League	GP	W	L	T/OT	MIN	GA	SO	GAA	SV%	GP	W	L	MIN	GA	SO	GAA	SV%
2017–18	Boston University	HE	25	12	8	4	1436	60	0	2.51	.913	—	—	—	—	—	—	—	—
2018–19	Boston University	HE	32	18	7	7	1930	61	2	1.90	.933	—	—	—	—	—	—	—	—
2019–20	Boston University	HE	26	16	7	3	1594	41	4	1.54	.934	—	—	—	—	—	—	—	—
2020–21	Boston University	HE	8	0	0	8	430	16	2	2.23	.911	—	—	—	—	—	—	—	—
2021–22	Quinnipiac University	ECAC	29	15	8	2	1537	37	6	1.44	.951	—	—	—	—	—	—	—	—
2022–23	Boston Pride	PHF	22	19	1	0	1290	36	7	1.67	.955	2	0	2	118	7	0	3.54	.891
2023–24	PWHL New York	PWHL	15	7	8	0	901	36	1	2.40	.930	—	—	—	—	—	—	—	—
2024–25	New York Sirens	PWHL	20	10	8	1	1162	47	4	2.43	.919	—	—	—	—	—	—	—	—
2025–26	Seattle Torrent	PWHL	17	5	8	1	1009	43	0	2.56	.915	—	—	—	—	—	—	—	—
PWHL totals			52	22	23	2	3072	126	5	2.46	.921	—	—	—	—	—	—	—	—

== Awards and honours ==
Award	Year	Ref
PHF
Goaltender of the Year	2023	
Rookie of the Year	2023	
College
All-USCHO First Team	2022	
New England Division I All-Star Team	2022	
ECAC All-Academic Team	2022	
Hockey East All-Academic Team Distinguished Scholar	2018, 2019, 2020, 2021	
Hockey East All-Star Second Team	2020	
AHCA All-American Scholar	2019, 2020	
Hockey East All-Star Third Team	2019	
Hockey East All-Rookie Team	2018	
Boston University Terriers
Gretchen Schuyler Award	2021	
Quinnipiac Bobcats
Team MVP	2022	

=== Records ===
==== Boston University ====
Boston University Terriers women's ice hockey program records, valid through conclusion of 2021–22 season.

- Best career save percentage (minimum 40 games played), .929 SV%
- Best career goals against average, 1.98 GAA
- Best single-season save percentage, .943 SV% (2019–20)
- Best single-season goals against average, 1.54 GAA (2019–20)

==== Quinnipiac University ====
Quinnipiac Bobcats women's ice hockey program records, valid through conclusion of 2021–22 season.

- Best single-season save percentage, .951 SV%
- Most saves in a single game, 73 saves (vs. Ohio State – March 12, 2022)
