= Lexie Laing =

American ice hockey forward (born 1996)

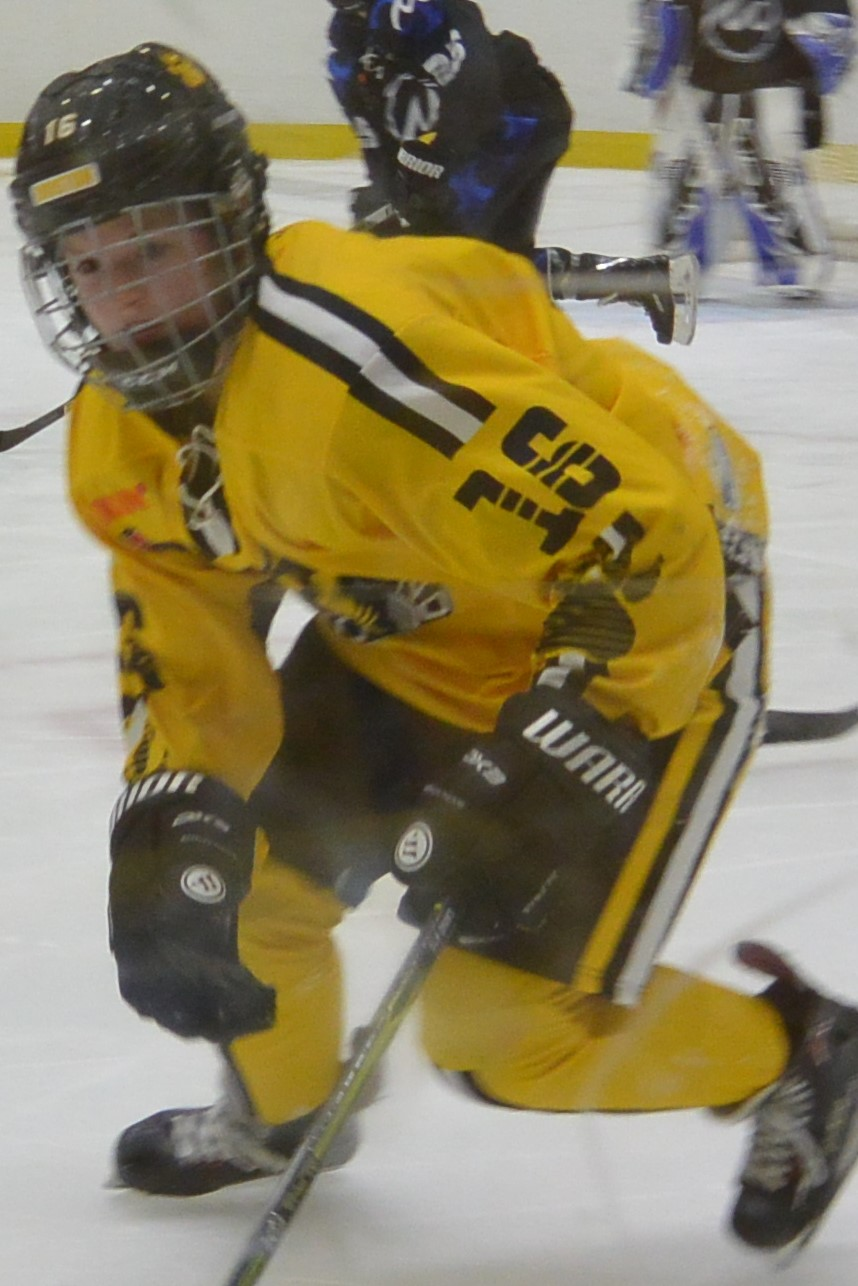
- Lexie Laing playing for the Boston Pride October 19, 2019
- Born: June 24, 1996 (age 30) Marblehead, Massachusetts, U.S.
- Height: 165 cm (5 ft 5 in)
- Position: Forward
- Shot: Right
- Played for: Minnesota Whitecaps; Boston Pride; Harvard Crimson
- Playing career: 2014–2023

Alexandria "Lexie" Laing is an American former ice hockey forward, most recently having played for the Boston Pride of the Premier Hockey Federation (PHF).

== Career ==
During high school, Laing played for the Noble and Greenough School, serving as team captain for the 2013–14 season and being named NEPSAC Division I Player of the Year in 2014. She also played for Assabet Valley. She received the 2014 John Carlton Memorial Award.

From 2014 to 2019, she attended Harvard University, playing for the university's women's ice hockey programme. She scored 25 points in 36 games in her rookie NCAA season, being named a finalist for the ECAC Rookie of the Year Award and notching two assists in Harvard's Beanpot victory over the Boston College Eagles. She captained Harvard in her final season with the team, putting up a career-high 26 points in 31 games, leading the team in scoring and being named an All-Ivy Honorable Mention.

She was selected 12th overall by the Boston Pride in the 2017 NWHL Draft, and would go on to sign her first professional contract with the club after graduating. In her first season with the Pride, she scored 27 points in 24 games, the fourth leading scorer on her team and eighth overall in the league. She was named to Team Dempsey for the 2020 NWHL All-Star Game.

== International career ==
Laing represented the United States at the 2013 and 2014 IIHF World Women's U18 Championship, scoring a total of nine points in ten games as the country won silver both times.

== Style of play ==
On top of her offensive abilities, Laing has been noted both for her strong two-way play and skills as a faceoff specialist, drawing comparisons to Boston Bruins centre Patrice Bergeron.

== Personal life ==
Laing has a bachelor's degree in Integrative Biology from Harvard University and a master's degree in Animals and Public Policy from the Cummings School of Veterinary Medicine at Tufts University. Her two older sisters, Brianna and Denna Laing, have also played for the Boston Pride.

== Career statistics ==
			Regular season					Playoffs
Season	Team	League	GP	G	A	Pts	PIM	GP	G	A	Pts	PIM
2014–15	Harvard Crimson	NCAA	36	10	15	25	10	–	–	–	–	–
2015–16	Harvard Crimson	NCAA	31	6	12	18	8	–	–	–	–	–
2016–17	Harvard Crimson	NCAA	29	8	13	21	24	–	–	–	–	–
2017–18	Harvard Crimson	NCAA	3	1	0	1	2	–	–	–	–	–
2018-19	Harvard Crimson	NCAA	31	8	18	26	16	–	–	–	–	–
2019-20	Boston Pride	NWHL	24	12	15	27	4	1	0	0	0	0
2020–21	Boston Pride	NWHL	7	1	2	3	2	2	1	1	2	0
2021–22	Minnesota Whitecaps	PHF	20	2	4	6	10	2	0	0	0	0
2022–23	Boston Pride	PHF	6	0	1	1	0	–	–	–	–	–
NCAA totals			130	33	58	91	60	–	–	–	–	–
NWHL/PHF totals			57	15	22	37	16	5	1	1	2	0
