= Olivia Zafuto =

American ice hockey player (born 1997)

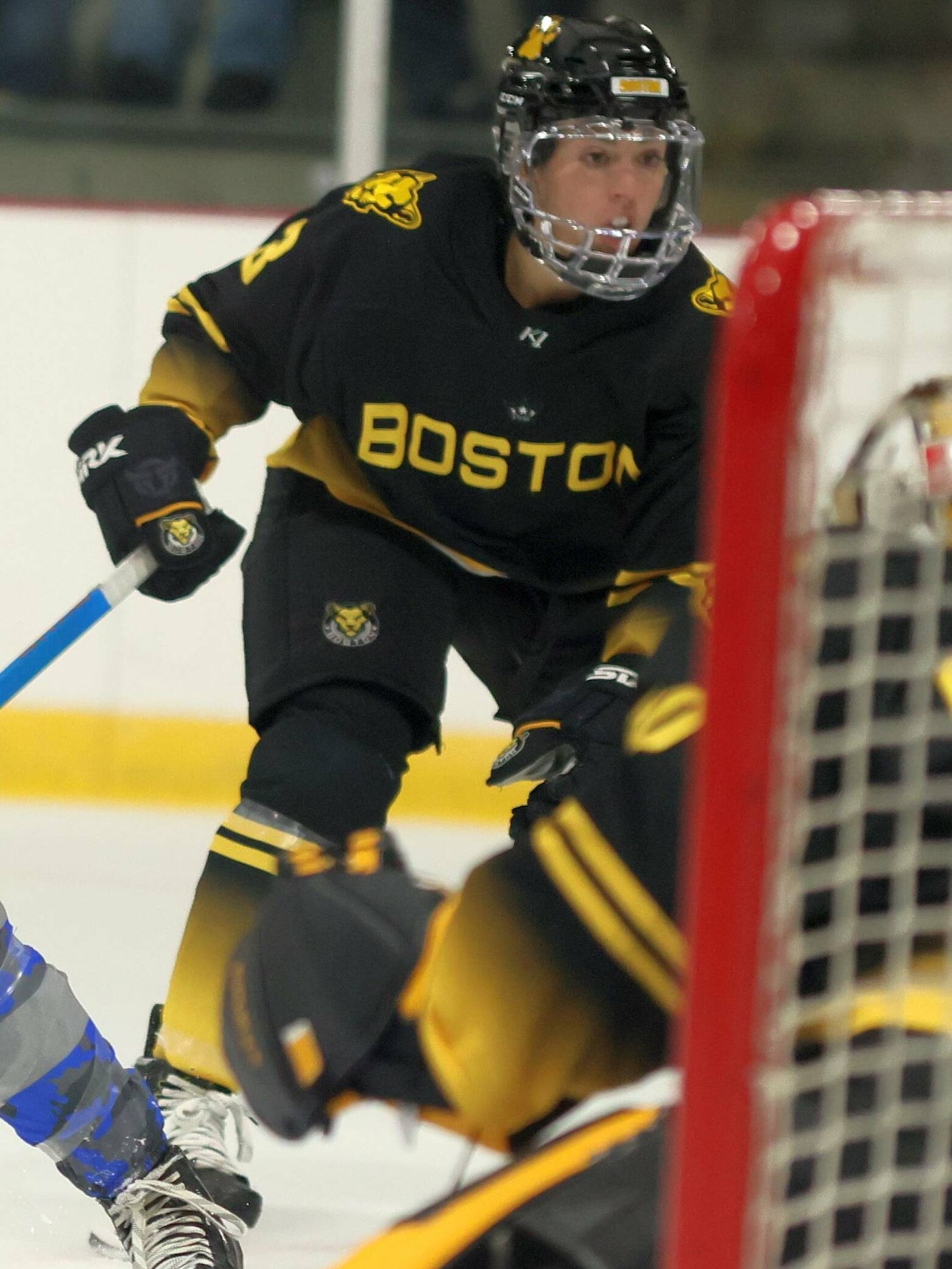
- Zafuto with the Boston Pride in 2022
- Born: January 25, 1997 (age 29) Niagara Falls, New York, US
- Height: 5 ft 6 in (168 cm)
- Position: Defense
- Shoots: Left
- PWHL team Former teams: Boston Fleet: HV71; Linköping HC; Boston Pride; PWHL New York
- Playing career: 2021–present

Olivia Zafuto (born January 25, 1997) is an American professional ice hockey defenceman who is signed as a reserve for the Boston Fleet of the Professional Women's Hockey League (PWHL). She has previously played for PWHL New York, the Boston Pride, Linköping HC, and HV71, and in the Professional Women's Hockey Players Association (PWHPA).

== College career ==
Zafuto played her college hockey at Colgate. Her junior and senior seasons, she ranked third-most nationally for points by a defenceman. She graduated with the most points (104) by a Colgate defenseman in program history.

== Professional career ==
In 2019, Zafuto was drafted by the Buffalo Beauts of the National Women's Hockey League (NWHL) but many players left to form their own league through the Professional Women's Hockey Player's Association (PWHPA). Zafuto played in Buffalo and Minnesota for two seasons. She then played for HV71 in the Swedish Women's Hockey League (SDHL) for 11 games before signing a contract with Linköping Hockey Club.

After a season-and-a-half, she returned to the United States to play in the rebrand of the NWHL, the Premier Hockey Federation (PHF), for the Boston Pride. She was an All-Star selection for the 2022-23 season. After one season with the Pride, Zafuto signed a 1-year $63,000 contract with the Metropolitan Riveters. However, the PHF was acquired by the Mark Walter Group in 2023 and a new, unified league was set up: the PWHL.

Zafuto was drafted by New York in the twelfth round, sixty-ninth overall, in the inaugural PWHL draft. She signed a one-year contract and played in thirteen games for New York during the 2023–24 season, recording one assist. She signed a reserve player contract with the Boston Fleet for the 2024–25 season.

Zafuto has also worked as a coach at Nichols and Thayer Academy.

== Career statistics ==
			Regular season					Playoffs
Season	Team	League	GP	G	A	Pts	PIM	GP	G	A	Pts	PIM
2015–16	Colgate University	ECAC	39	7	15	22	18	—	—	—	—	—
2016–17	Colgate University	ECAC	35	7	9	16	28	—	—	—	—	—
2017–18	Colgate University	ECAC	41	11	22	33	56	—	—	—	—	—
2018–19	Colgate University	ECAC	37	8	26	34	74	—	—	—	—	—
2020–21	HV71	SDHL	6	3	0	3	2	5	1	2	3	8
2021–22	Linköping HC	SDHL	35	10	10	29	20	7	1	1	2	6
2022–23	Boston Pride	PHF	22	5	5	10	29	2	0	0	0	0
2023–24	PWHL New York	PWHL	13	0	1	1	4	—	—	—	—	—
PWHL totals			13	0	1	1	4	—	—	—	—	—

== Personal life ==
Zafuto is in a relationship with her former Boston Pride teammate McKenna Brand.
