= Lauren Kelly (ice hockey) =

American ice hockey player (born 1996)

- Born: May 2, 1996 (age 28); Watertown, Massachusetts, United States
- Height: 171 cm (5 ft 7 in)
- Position: Defence
- Shoots: Left
- NWHL team: Boston Pride
- Played for: Northeastern Huskies
- Playing career: 2014–present

Lauren Kelly (born May 2, 1996) is an American ice hockey defender who played for the Boston Pride of the now defunct Premier Hockey Federation (PHF).

== Career ==
During high school, she played for The Winchendon School, serving as team captain in final year and becoming the school's first-ever female recipient of the Jason Ritchie Hockey Scholarship.

From 2014 to 2018, she attended Northeastern University, scoring 64 points in 140 NCAA games. She scored her first career collegiate goal against Mercyhurst on the 17th of October 2014, starting a three-game scoring streak. She notched a career-high 21 points in 36 games in her senior year, being named a WHEA Second-Team All-Star and a New England Hockey Writers' Division I All-Star.

She was drafted 16th overall by the Boston Pride in the 2017 NWHL Draft. After graduating, she would sign her first professional contract with the team. She put up three points in sixteen games in her rookie NWHL season.

Her production jumped during the 2019-20 season, up to 12 points in 23 games, as the Pride went almost undefeated during the regular season and made it to the Isobel Cup finals before the season was cancelled due to the COVID-19 pandemic in the United States.

== Career statistics ==
			Regular Season					Playoffs
Season	Team	League	GP	G	A	Pts	PIM	GP	G	A	Pts	PIM
2014–15	Northeastern University	NCAA	34	7	6	13	10	-	-	-	-	-
2015–16	Northeastern University	NCAA	36	4	16	20	20	-	-	-	-	-
2016–17	Northeastern University	NCAA	37	2	8	10	28	-	-	-	-	-
2017–18	Northeastern University	NCAA	33	12	9	21	32	-	-	-	-	-
2018–19	Boston Pride	NWHL	16	1	2	3	6	-	-	-	-	-
2019–20	Boston Pride	NWHL	23	2	10	12	25	1	0	1	1	0
2020–21	Boston Pride	NWHL
NWHL totals			39	3	12	15	31	1	0	1	1	0
