= Rebecca Russo =

American ice hockey player (born 1994)

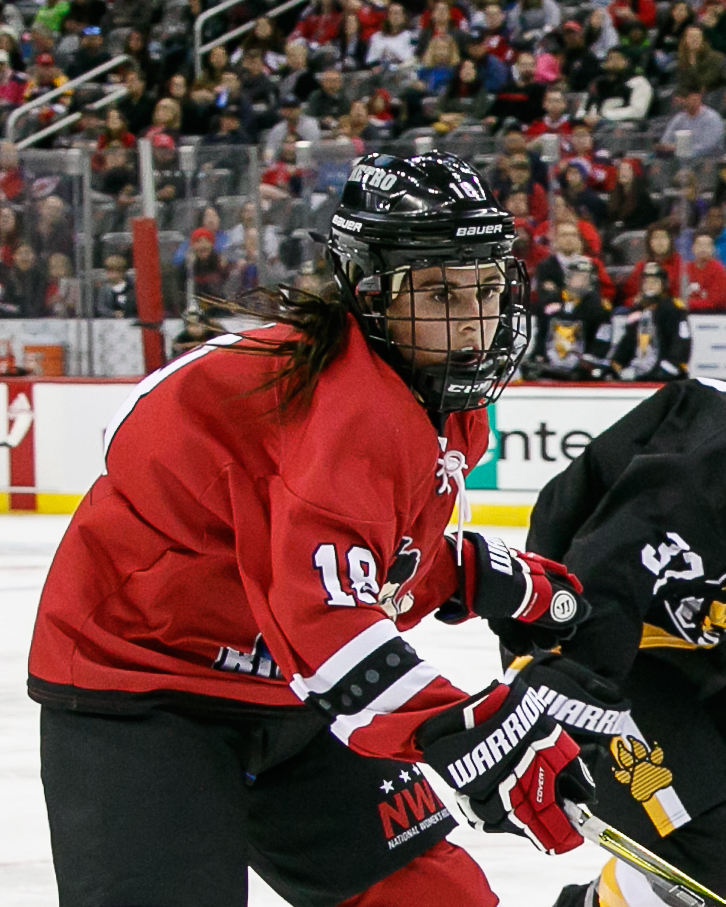
- Rebecca Russo playing for the Metropolitan Riveters in 2017
- Born: April 22, 1994 (age 32) New York, NY, USA
- Height: 5 ft 4 in (163 cm)
- Position: Forward
- NWHL team: New York Riveters
- Playing career: 2012–present

Rebecca Russo (born April 22, 1994) is an American-born women's ice hockey player. Having won a national U19 championship at Shattuck St. Mary's, Russo played her NCAA hockey with the BU Terriers. On November 3, 2015, Russo set the Boston University Terriers women's ice hockey record for most assists in one game, with five against Yale.

In her first season of NWHL hockey, she was selected to play in the 2017 All-Star Game. Russo's selection came via an online fan vote on the NWHL website, as she placed among the top four vote-getters.

== Playing career ==
Russo competed for the United States U18 national team in an exhibition series against Canada during the summer of 2011.

=== NCAA ===
Making her NCAA debut on October 5, 2012, Russo would gain her first point with the Terriers, logging an assists. Russo scored her first NCAA goal on February 20, 2013, against the New Hampshire Wildcats. In her senior season (2015–16) with the Terriers, Russo logged a career-best 38 points (15 goals, 23 assists), while appearing in 39 contests. During her senior season, she also registered a scoring streak from January 23 to February 14.

=== NWHL ===
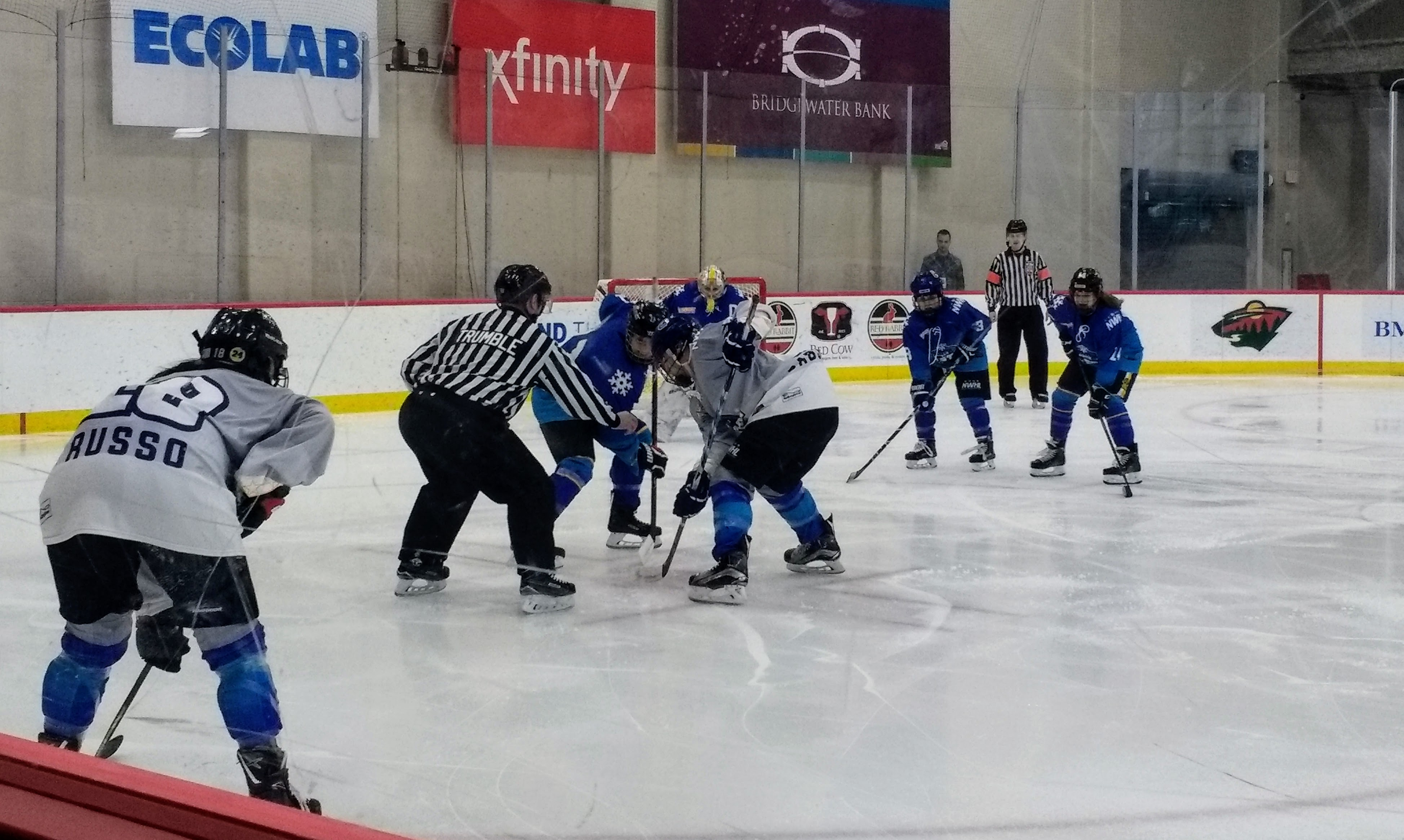
Russo (left) participating at the 2018 NWHL All-Star Game at TRIA Rink

Russo would score twice in a 4–0 win on November 20, 2016, against the Connecticut Whale, which was the first shutout in Riveters history. Playing for Team Kessel, Russo scored a goal at the 2nd NWHL All-Star Game. She would also win the fastest skater competition in the 2017 NWHL All-Star Skills Competition.

In May 2017, it was announced that Russo had re-signed with the New York Riveters for the 2017/18 season. Russo participated in the 3rd NWHL All-Star Game.

== Personal ==
Russo has worked for the MLB Network.
