= McKenna Brand =

American ice hockey forward (born 1996)

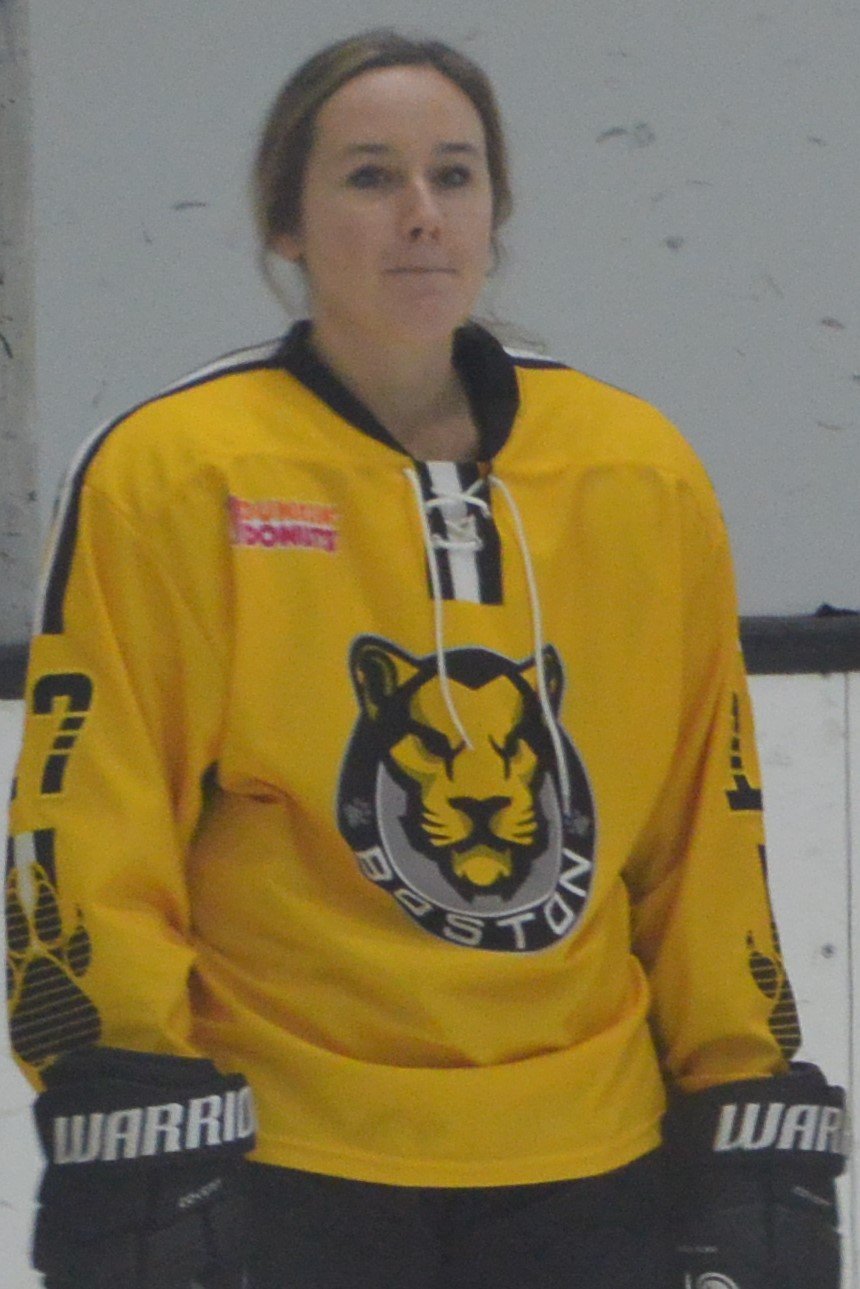
- Brand with the Boston Pride in 2018
- Born: May 18, 1996 (age 30) Park Rapids, Minnesota, U.S.
- Height: 168 cm (5 ft 6 in)
- Position: Forward
- Shoots: Left
- PHF team: Boston Pride
- Played for: Northeastern Huskies
- Playing career: 2018–present

McKenna Brand is a former American ice hockey forward, who played for the Boston Pride of the now defunct Premier Hockey Federation (PHF).

== Career ==
In four seasons with Northeastern University, Brand put up 111 points in 150 games, being named a First Team All-Star in 2017, and twice being named to the All Academic Team. In 2017, her team won Hockey East.

In 2017, she had been selected 11th overall by the Metropolitan Riveters in the NWHL Draft, but chose to sign with the Boston Pride instead in 2018.

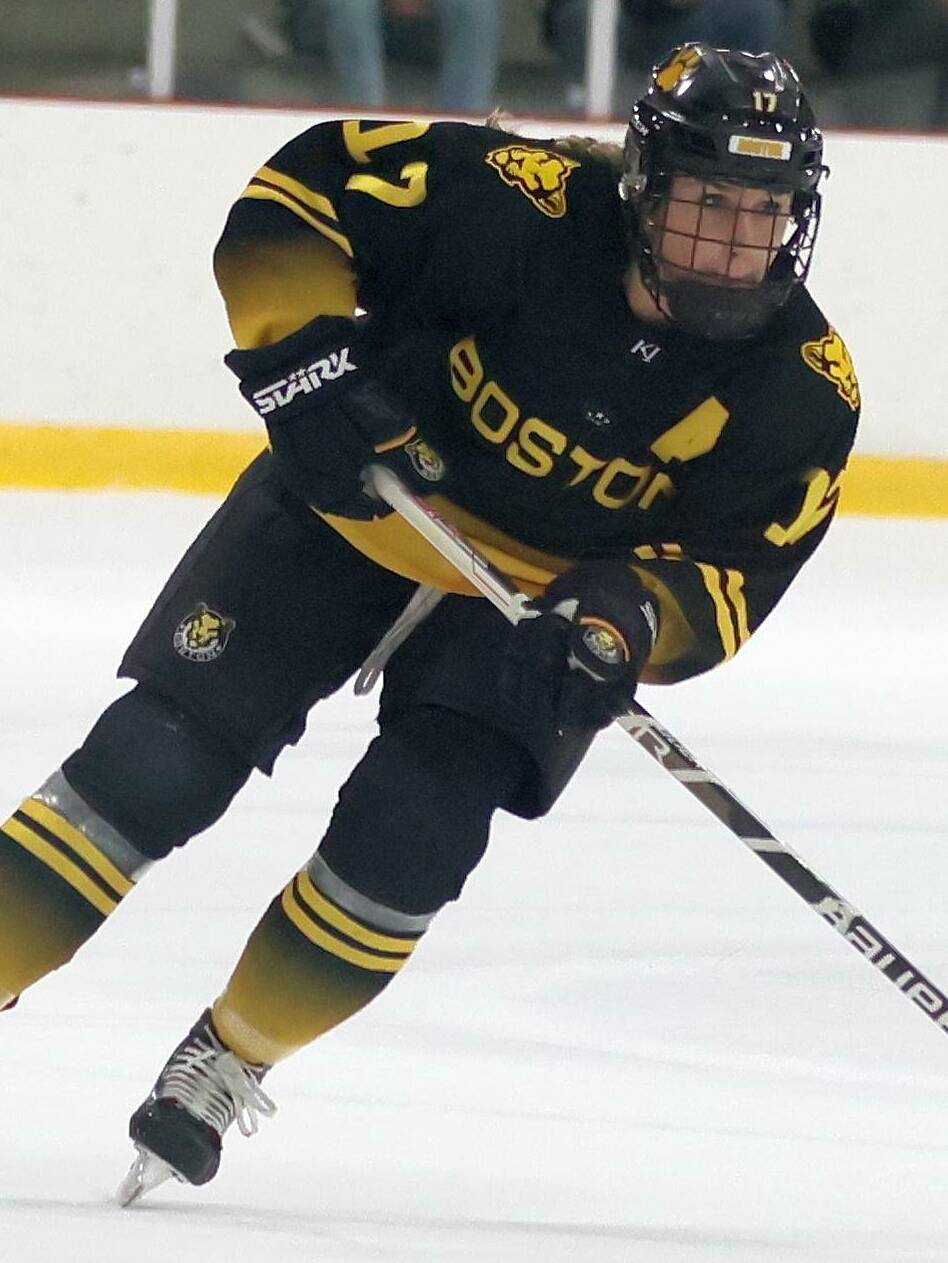
Brand with the Pride in 2022

In her first professional season, she put up 17 points in 16 games for the Pride, tied for fifth in the league, That year, she was named a finalist for the NWHL's Newcomer of the Year award. The next year, she put up 36 points in 24 games the next season, finishing as the third highest scorer. In 2020, she was named to Team Dempsey for the NWHL All-Star Game.

=== International ===
In 2013, she played 3 games for the United States national hockey team in the U18 USA-Canada Series.

== Personal life ==
Outside of hockey, Brand has a degree in health sciences. Her brother currently plays hockey for the St. Cloud Huskies. She in a relationship with her former Pride teammate Olivia Zafuto.

== Career statistics ==
			Regular season					Playoffs
Season	Team	League	GP	G	A	Pts	PIM	GP	G	A	Pts	PIM
2018-19	Boston Pride	NWHL	16	6	11	17	6	1	0	0	0	0
2019-20	Boston Pride	NWHL	24	19	17	36	14	1	0	1	1	0
2020-21	Boston Pride	NWHL	7	3	4	7	4	2	1	1	2	2
2021-22	Boston Pride	PHF	20	5	10	15	6	3	0	3	3	0
2022-23	Boston Pride	PHF	24	4	8	12	6	2	0	0	0	0
NWHL/PHF totals			91	37	50	87	36	9	1	5	6	2

== Championships ==
Championships
2021 Isobel Cup Champion
2022 Isobel Cup Champion
