= List of PHF individual award winners =

Since 2016, the year of its inaugural season (which was then known as the NWHL), the Premier Hockey Federation (PHF) grants several annual awards to players in the league, including Most Valuable Player, Goaltender of the Year, Best Defender, Rookie of the Year, Newcomer of the Year, Denna Laing Award (formerly the Perseverance Award), Foundation Award, Offensive Player of the Year (formerly the Leading Scorer Award), and the Fans' Three Stars of the Season. The award for Most Valuable Player is voted on by the Professional Hockey Writers' Association. Nominees for the Foundation Award are chosen by the Players Association and voted on by fans. Other awards are voted on a panel of journalists.

For the 2022–23 season, the league established a new Rookie of the Year award to be given to "the top first-year player who has joined the league immediately following their collegiate career". This was in contrast to the existing Newcomer of the Year award, which was from then on to be awarded to "the top first-year player who has joined the league with prior professional experience". The league also announced the new Outstanding Player of the Year award, to be voted on by members of the Premier Hockey Federation Players' Association, as well as the renaming of the Leading Scorer award to Offensive Player of the Year.

== Most Valuable Player ==
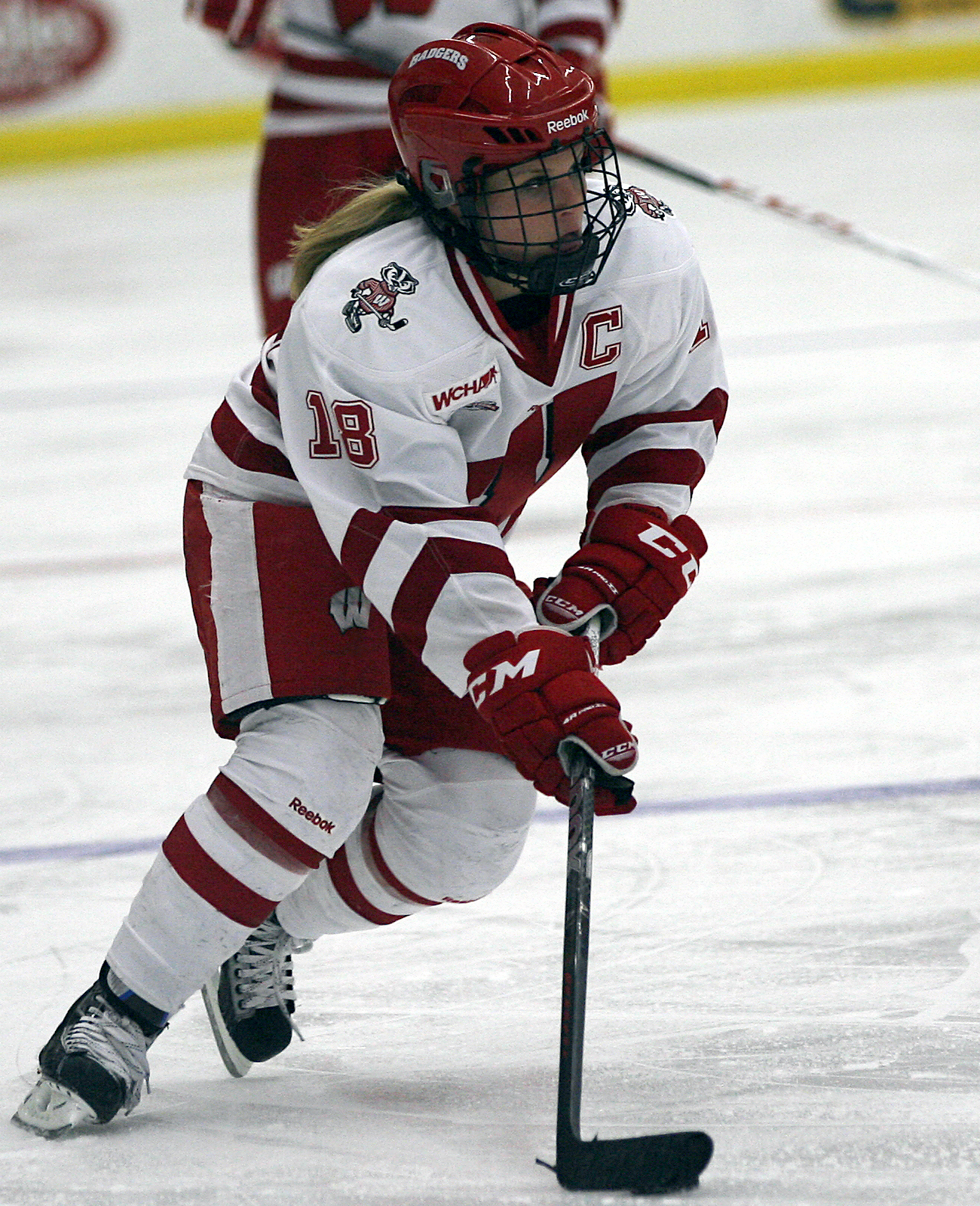
Brianna Decker, two-time Most Valuable Player

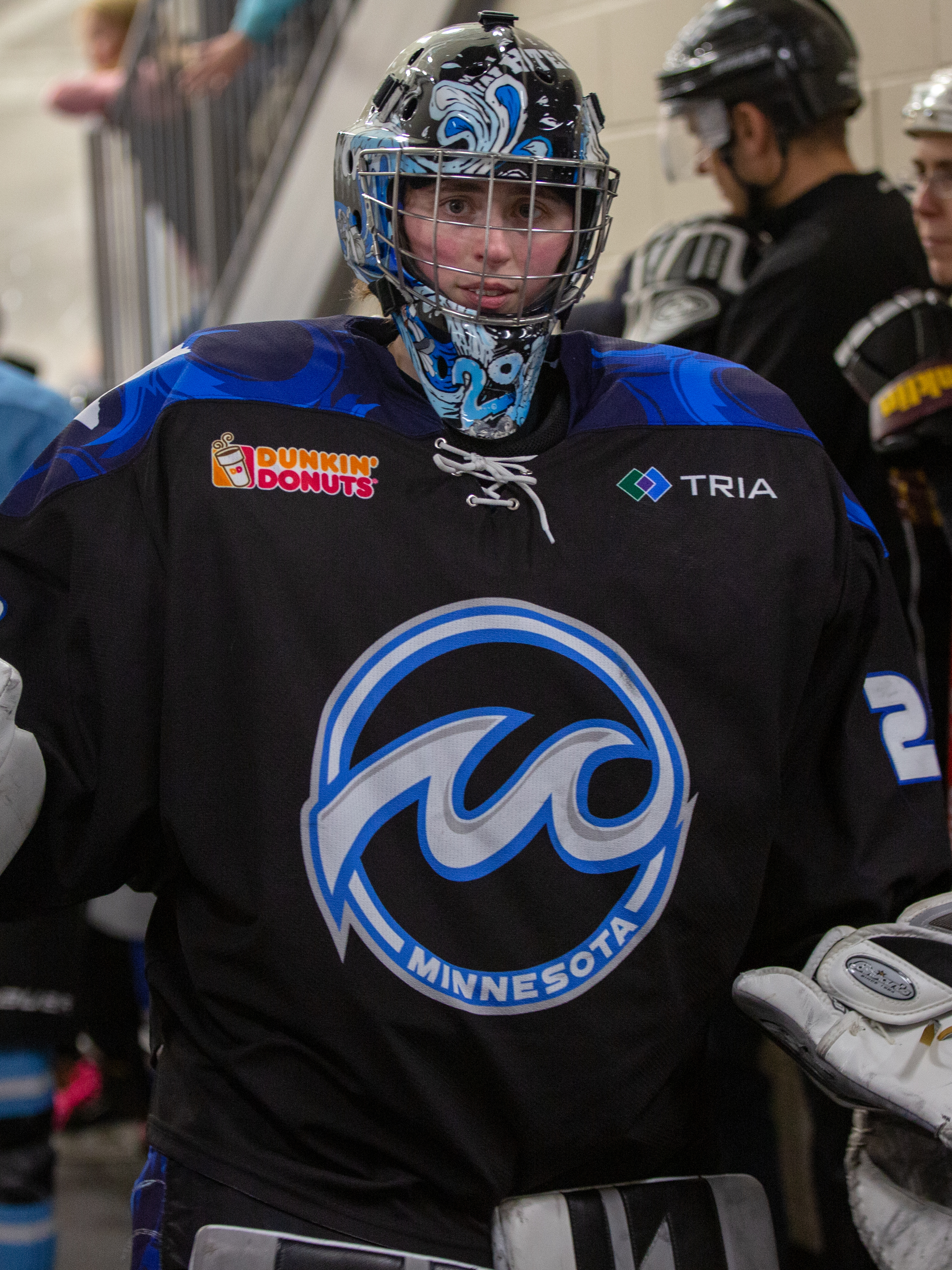
Amanda Leveille, two-time Goaltender of the Year

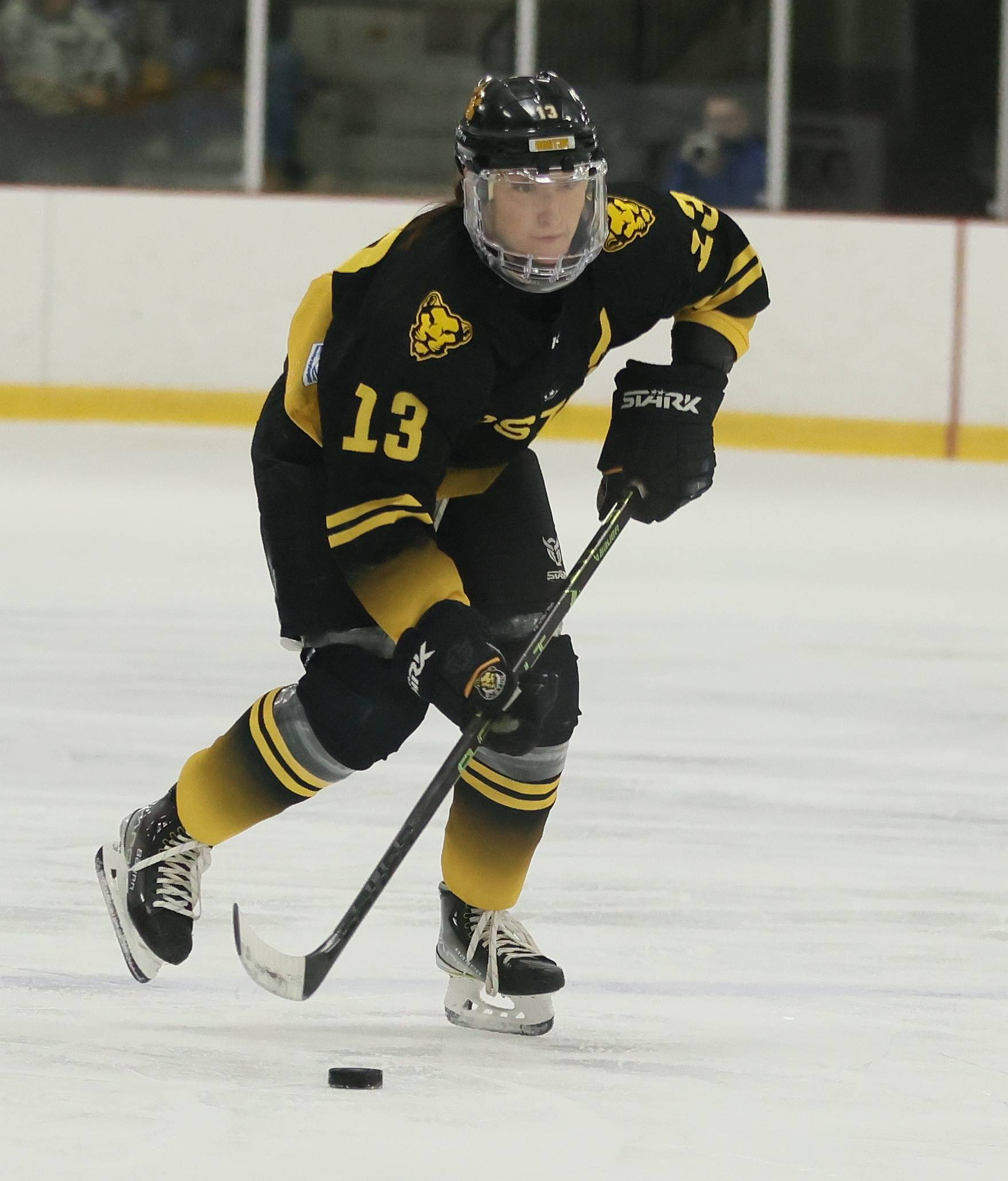
Kaleigh Fratkin, two-time Defender of the Year

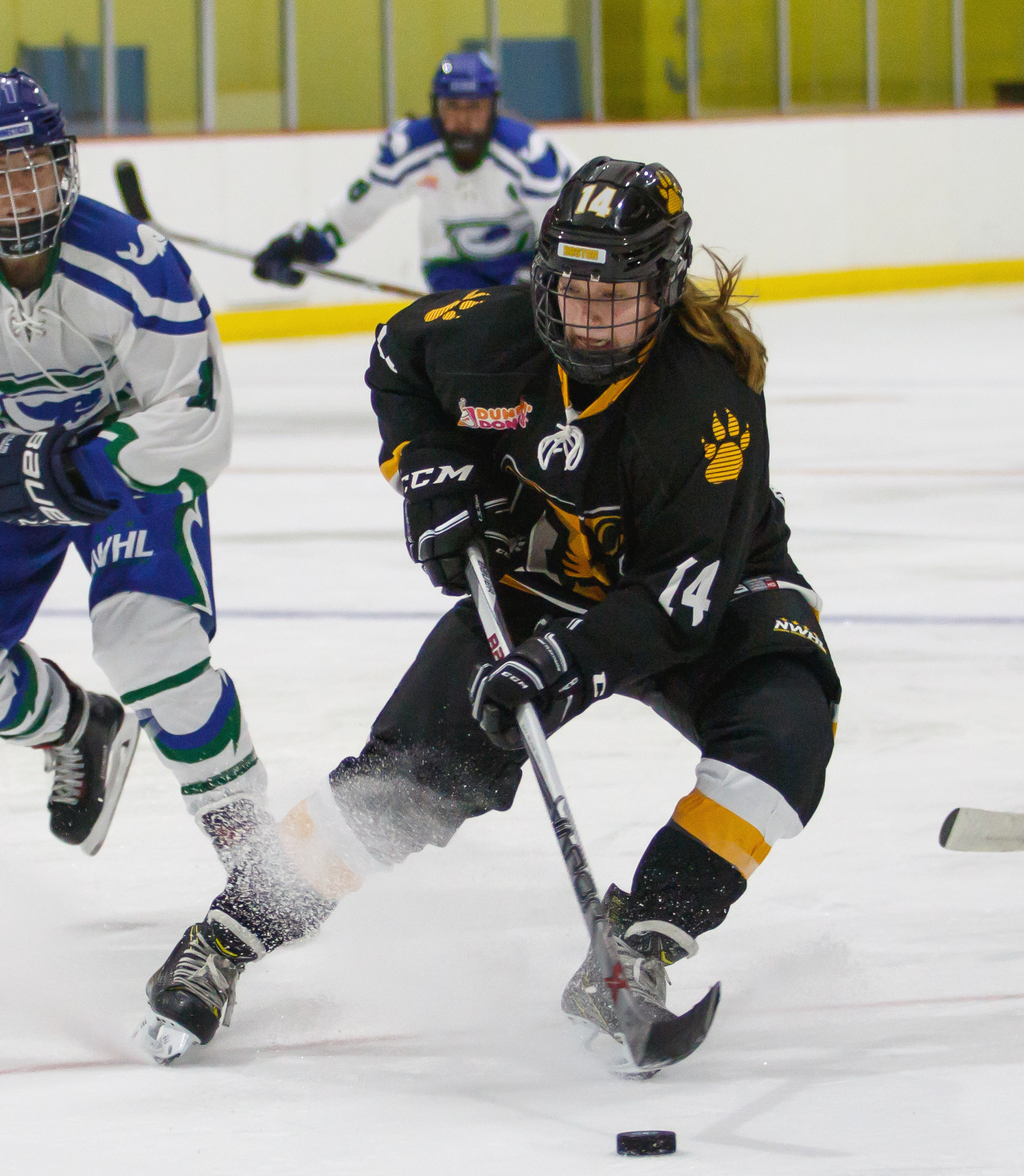
Jillian Dempsey, two-time Denna Laing Award winner

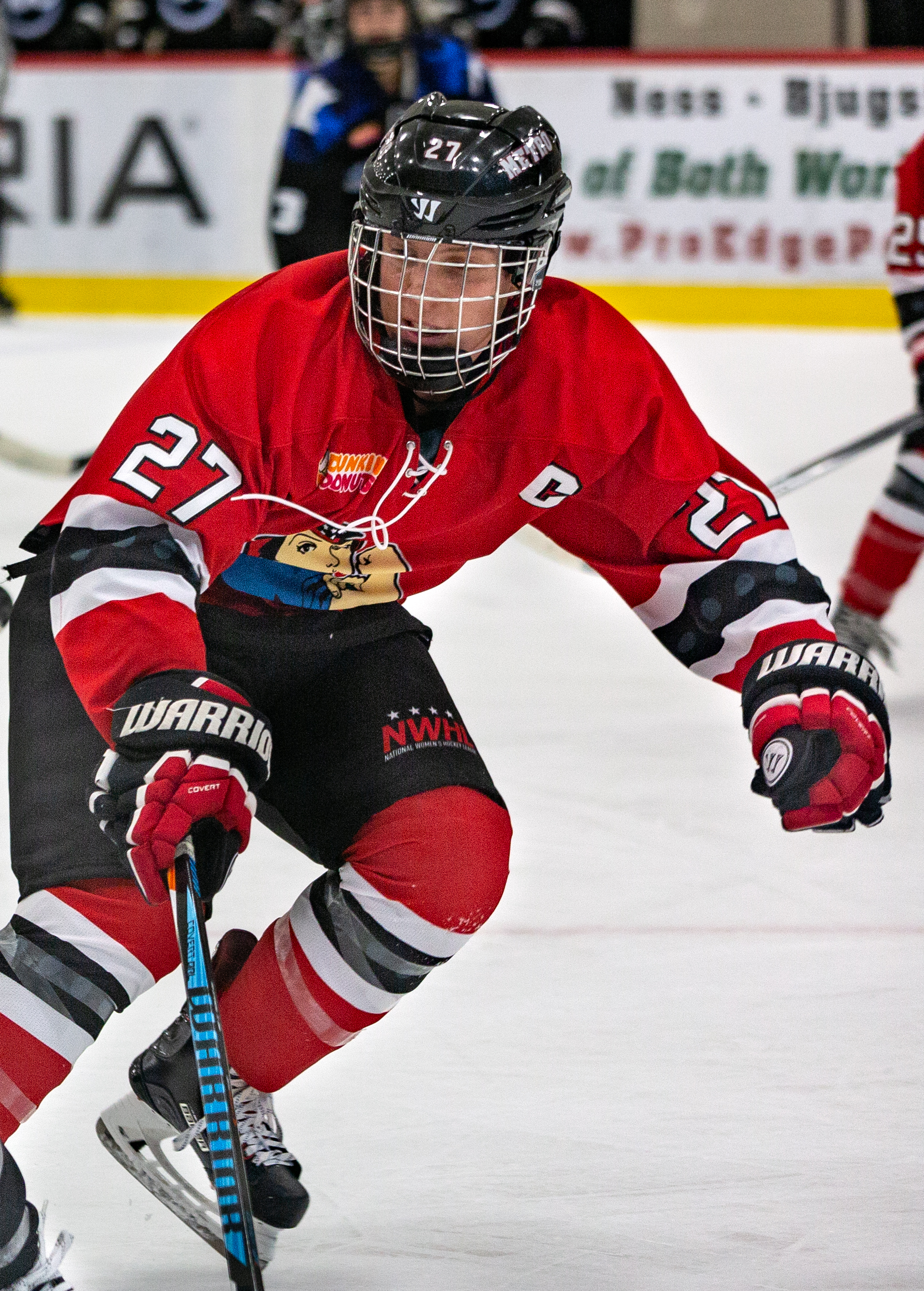
Michelle Picard, two-time Foundation Award winner

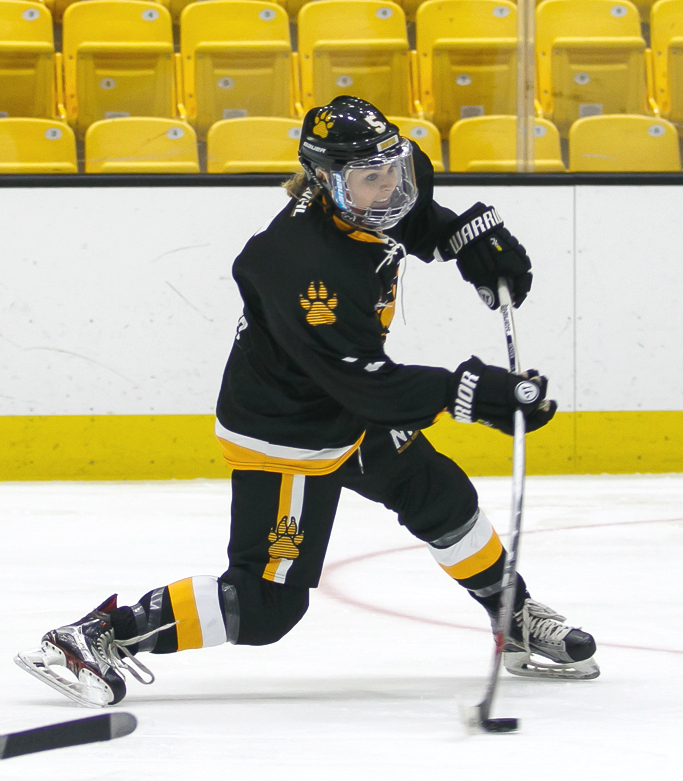
Lexi Bender, two-time Foundation Award winner

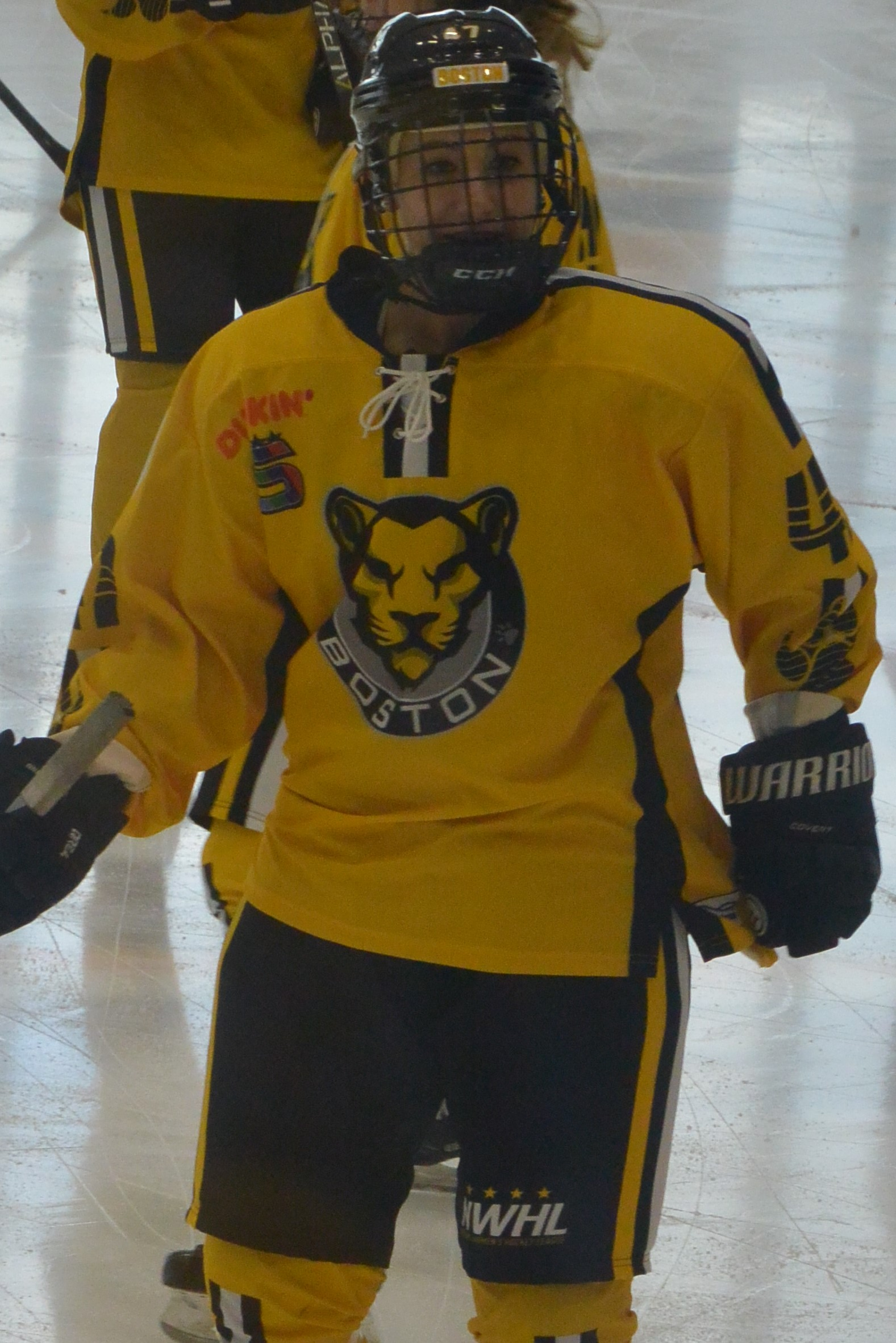
Mallory Souliotis, two-time Foundation Award winner

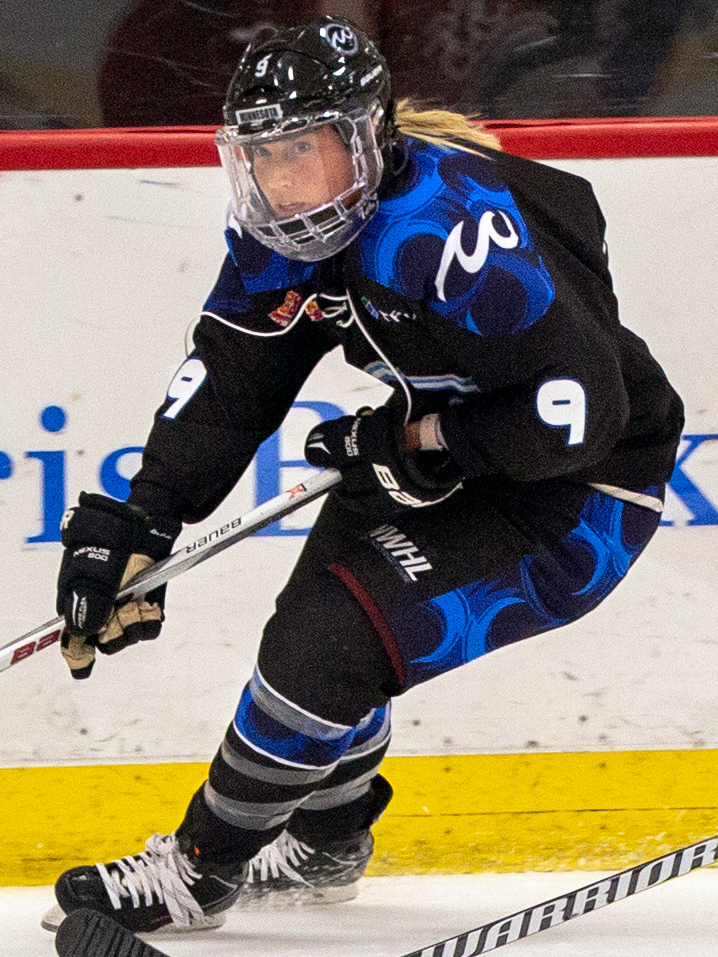
Allie Thunstrom, two-time Foundation Award winner

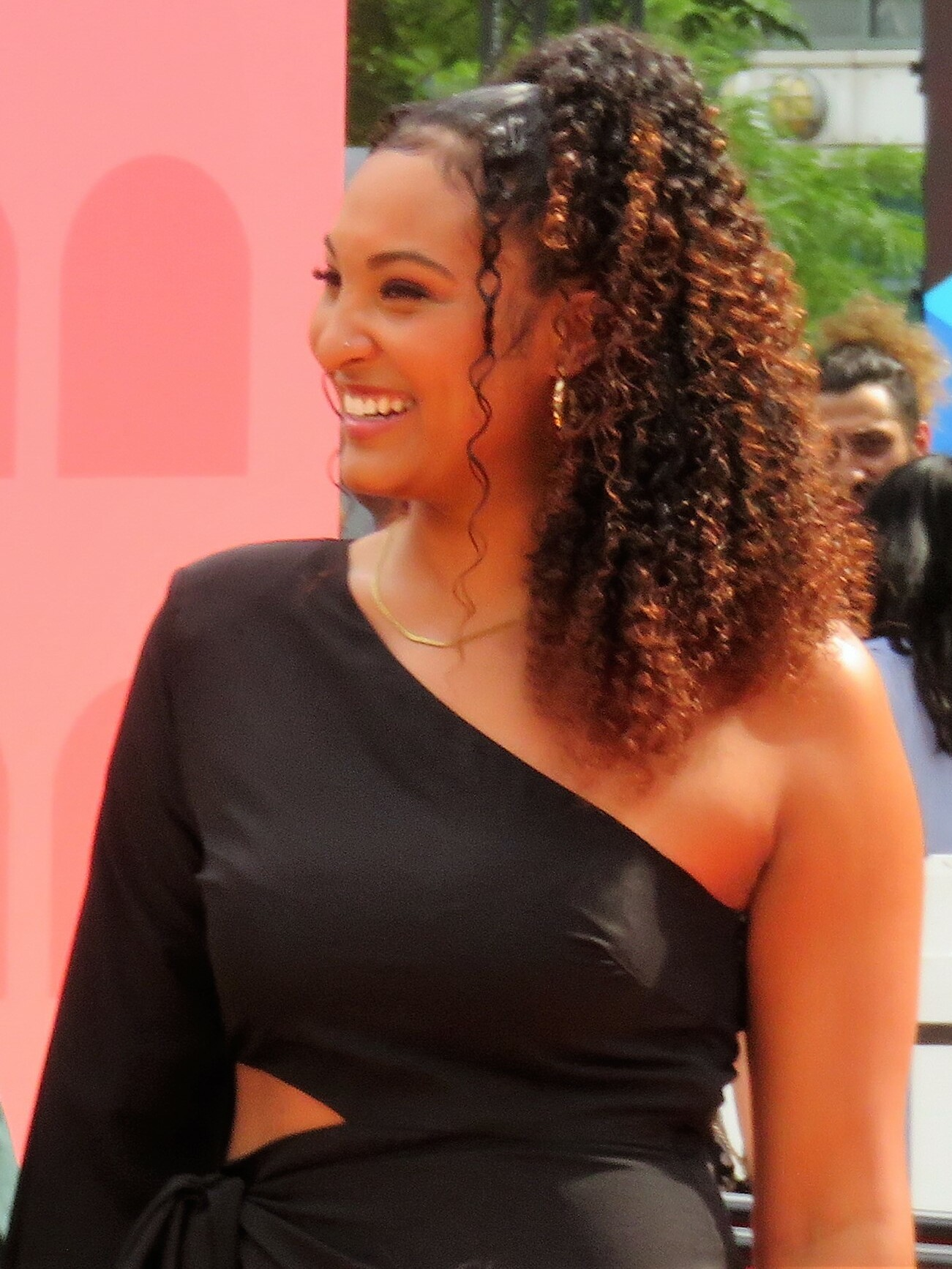
Saroya Tinker, two-time Foundation Award winner

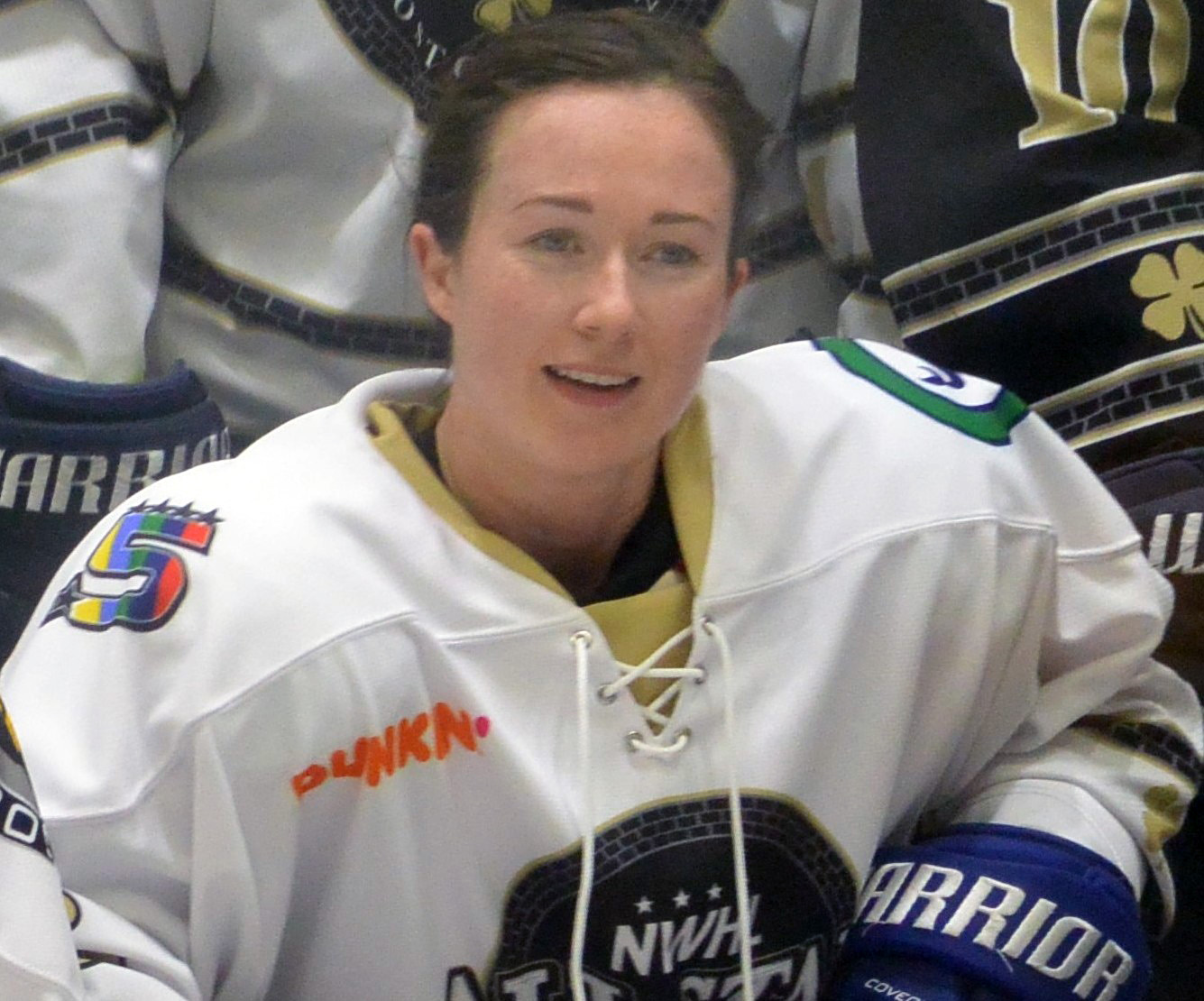
Shannon Turner, two-time Foundation Award winner

Season	Player	Team
2015–16	Brianna Decker	Boston Pride
2016–17	Brianna Decker	Boston Pride
2017–18	Alexa Gruschow	Metropolitan Riveters
2018–19	Maddie Elia	Buffalo Beauts
2019–20	Jillian Dempsey	Boston Pride
2019–20	Allie Thunstrom	Minnesota Whitecaps
2020–21	Mikyla Grant-Mentis	Toronto Six
2021–22	Kennedy Marchment	Connecticut Whale
2022–23	Loren Gabel	Boston Pride

== Outstanding Player of the Year ==
Season	Player	Team
2022–23	Loren Gabel	Boston Pride

== Offensive Player of the Year (formerly Leading Scorer Award) ==
Season	Player	Team
2015–16	Hilary Knight	Boston Pride
2016–17	Brianna Decker	Boston Pride
2017–18	Alexa Gruschow	Metropolitan Riveters
2018–19	Hayley Scamurra	Buffalo Beauts
2019–20	Jillian Dempsey	Boston Pride
2022–23	Loren Gabel	Boston Pride

== Goaltender of the Year ==
Season	Player	Team
2015–16	Brittany Ott	Boston Pride
2016–17	Katie Fitzgerald	New York Riveters
2017–18	Amanda Leveille	Buffalo Beauts
2018–19	Shannon Szabados	Buffalo Beauts
2019–20	Lovisa Selander	Boston Pride
2020–21	Amanda Leveille	Minnesota Whitecaps
2021–22	Elaine Chuli	Toronto Six
2022–23	Corinne Schroeder	Boston Pride

== Defender of the Year ==
Season	Player	Team
2015–16	Gigi Marvin	Boston Pride
2016–17	Megan Bozek	Buffalo Beauts
2017–18	Courtney Burke	Metropolitan Riveters
2018–19	Blake Bolden	Buffalo Beauts
2019–20	Kaleigh Fratkin	Boston Pride
2020–21	Kaleigh Fratkin	Boston Pride
2021–22	Dominique Kremer	Buffalo Beauts
2022–23	Kali Flanagan	Boston Pride

== Newcomer of the Year ==
Season	Player	Team
2017–18	Hayley Scamurra	Buffalo Beauts
2018–19	Jonna Curtis	Minnesota Whitecaps
2019–20	Kate Leary	Metropolitan Riveters
2020–21	Mikyla Grant-Mentis	Toronto Six
2021–22	Taylor Girard	Connecticut Whale
2022–23	Loren Gabel	Boston Pride

== Rookie of the Year ==
Season	Player	Team
2022–23	Corinne Schroeder	Boston Pride

== Denna Laing Award (formerly Perseverance Award) ==
Season	Player	Team
2015–16	Denna Laing	Boston Pride
2016–17	Ashley Johnston	New York Riveters
2017–18	Jillian Dempsey	Boston Pride
2018–19	Jillian Dempsey	Boston Pride
2020–21	Saroya Tinker	Metropolitan Riveters
2021–22	Elena Orlando	Buffalo Beauts
2022–23	Lauren Kelly	Boston Pride

== Foundation Award ==
Season	Player	Team
2015–16	Denna Laing	Boston Pride
2016–17	Alyssa Gagliardi	Boston Pride
2016–17	Kelsey Neumann	Buffalo Beauts
2016–17	Elena Orlando	Connecticut Whale
2016–17	Michelle Picard	New York Riveters
2017–18	Rachael Ade	Connecticut Whale
2017–18	Lexi Bender	Boston Pride
2017–18	Jacquie Greco	Buffalo Beauts
2017–18	Michelle Picard	Metropolitan Riveters
2018–19	Kelly Babstock	Buffalo Beauts
2018–19	Hannah Brandt	Minnesota Whitecaps
2018–19	Sarah Hughson	Connecticut Whale
2018–19	Kimberly Sass	Metropolitan Riveters
2018–19	Mallory Souliotis	Boston Pride
2019–20	Lexi Bender	Boston Pride
2019–20	Jordan Brickner	Connecticut Whale
2019–20	Rebecca Morse	Metropolitan Riveters
2019–20	Emma Ruggiero	Buffalo Beauts
2019–20	Allie Thunstrom	Minnesota Whitecaps
2020–21	Mikyla Grant-Mentis	Toronto Six
2020–21	Carly Jackson	Buffalo Beauts
2020–21	Grace Klienbach	Connecticut Whale
2020–21	Amanda Leveille	Minnesota Whitecaps
2020–21	Mallory Souliotis	Boston Pride
2020–21	Saroya Tinker	Metropolitan Riveters
2021–22	Jenna Rheault	Boston Pride
2021–22	Grace Klienbach	Buffalo Beauts
2021–22	Shannon Turner	Connecticut Whale
2021–22	Madison Packer	Metropolitan Riveters
2021–22	Allie Thunstrom	Minnesota Whitecaps
2021–22	Saroya Tinker	Toronto Six
2022–23	Sammy Davis	Boston Pride
2022–23	Cassidy MacPherson	Buffalo Beauts
2022–23	Shannon Turner	Connecticut Whale
2022–23	Reagan Rust	Metropolitan Riveters
2022–23	Denisa Křížová	Minnesota Whitecaps
2022–23	Laura Jardin	Montreal Force
2022–23	Shiann Darkangelo	Toronto Six
