= Alexa Gruschow =

American ice hockey player

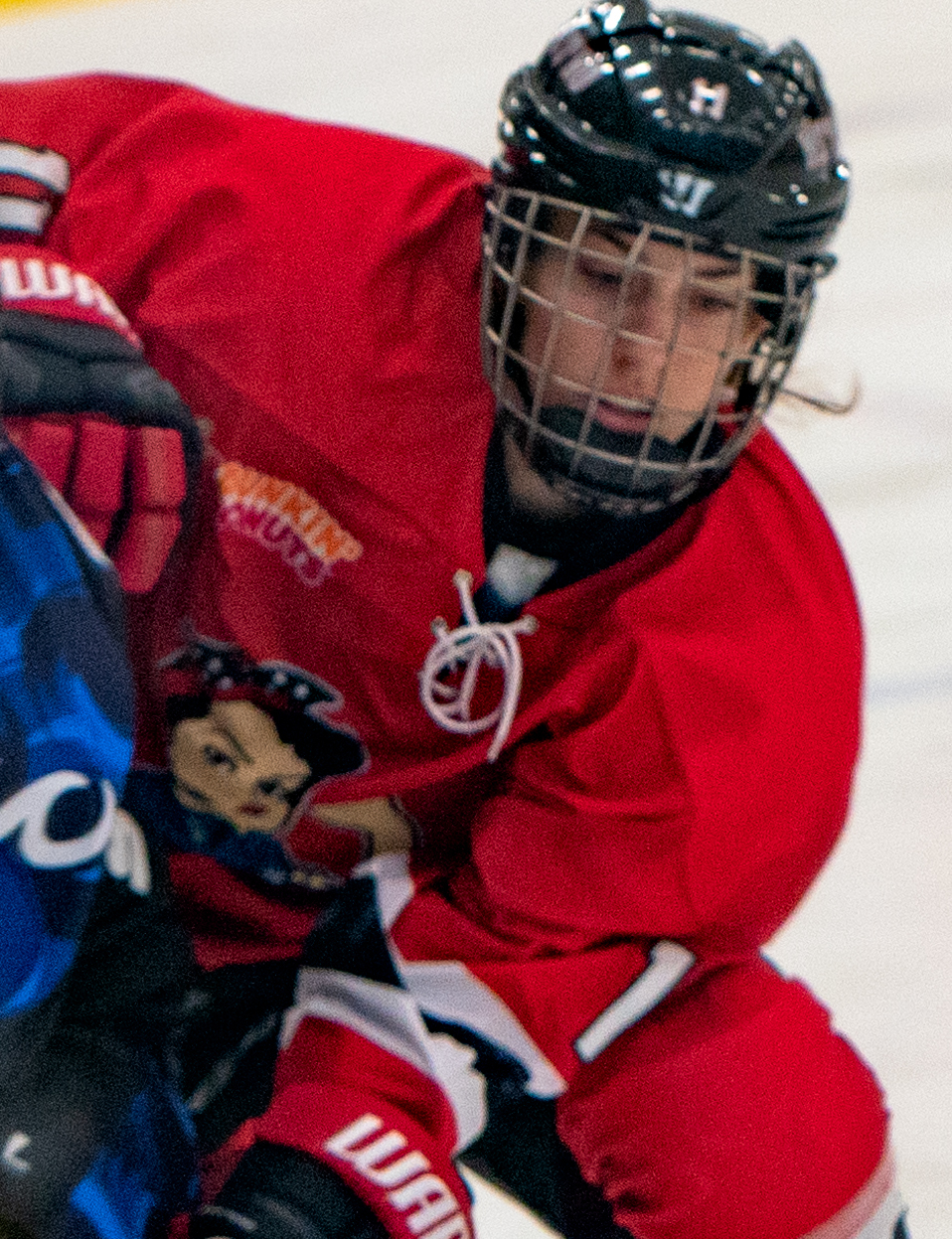
- Gruschow with the Metropolitan Riveters in 2018
- Born: April 16, 1994 (age 30); Mechanicsburg, Pennsylvania, U.S.
- Height: 5 ft 6 in (168 cm)
- Weight: 134 lb (61 kg; 9 st 8 lb)
- Position: Forward
- Shoots: Right
- PWHL team Former teams: PWHL New York; Metropolitan Riveters
- Playing career: 2012–present

Alexa Gruschow (born April 16, 1994) is an American ice hockey player. She was on the reserve roster of PWHL New York during the 2023–24 season of the Professional Women's Hockey League (PWHL).

Gruschow won the National Women's Hockey League (NWHL) scoring title and the Isobel Cup with the Metropolitan Riveters in the 2017–18 season.

== Playing career ==
=== NCAA ===
During her college ice hockey career with the RPI Engineers women's ice hockey program, Gruschow appeared in 133 games and accumulated 46 goals and 47 assists for a total of 93 points. Graduating third on the Engineer's all-time scoring list, trailing Alisa Harrison and Whitney Naslund, she also ranked second all-time in goals scored, trailing only Naslund.

During her senior season, she registered a career-best 23 points in 34 appearances, logging 13 goals plus 10 assists. In addition, she paced the Engineers in power play goals with four, while also leading with 115 shots, 313 face-off wins and a .503 face-off winning percentage, respectively.

Gruschow signed a player contract with the New York Riveters on June 21, 2016, becoming the second Engineers alumna to compete in the NWHL – the first was Jordan Smelker, who captured an Isobel Cup title with the Boston Pride in 2015.

== Career statistics ==
=== Regular season and playoffs ===
			Regular season					Playoffs
Season	Team	League	GP	G	A	Pts	PIM	GP	G	A	Pts	PIM
2010–11	Washington Pride	JWHL	27	9	22	31	24	—	—	—	—	—
2011–12	Washington Pride	JWHL	31	23	34	57	63	—	—	—	—	—
2012–13	RPI Engineers	ECAC	36	13	14	27	36	—	—	—	—	—
2013–14	RPI Engineers	ECAC	32	7	13	20	38	—	—	—	—	—
2014–15	RPI Engineers	ECAC	31	13	10	23	40	—	—	—	—	—
2015–16	RPI Engineers	ECAC	31	13	10	23	20	—	—	—	—	—
2016–17	New York Riveters	NWHL	18	2	8	10	12	1	0	1	1	0
2017–18	Metropolitan Riveters	NWHL	16	9	13	22	26	2	1	0	1	0
2018–19	Metropolitan Riveters	NWHL	16	2	2	4	12	2	2	0	2	2
2020–21	New Hampshire	PWHPA	6	1	1	2	2	—	—	—	—	—
2021–22	Boston	PWHPA	9	3	4	7	4	—	—	—	—	—
2022–23	Team Harvey's	PWHPA	18	1	2	3	4	—	—	—	—	—
2023–24	New York	PWHL	4	0	0	0	4	—	—	—	—	—
NWHL totals			50	13	23	36	50	5	3	1	4	2
PWHPA totals			33	5	7	12	10	—	—	—	—	—

== Awards and honors ==
=== NCAA ===
- 2013 ECAC All-Rookie Team
- 2013 ECAC All-Academic
- 2013 RPI Engineers women's ice hockey Rookie of the Year
- 2016 RPI Engineers women's ice hockey Most Valuable Player

=== NWHL ===
- NWHL Player of the Week, Awarded November 6, 2017
- 2018 NWHL Most Valuable Player
- 2018 NWHL Scoring Champion
- Most Valuable Player, 2018 Isobel Cup Finals

Preceded by Brianna Decker (2017)	NWHL Most Valuable Player (MVP); 2018	Succeeded by Maddie Elia
Preceded by Brianna Decker (2017)	NWHL Leading Scorer Award; 2018	Succeeded by Hayley Scamurra
