= Rebecca Morse (ice hockey) =

American ice hockey player

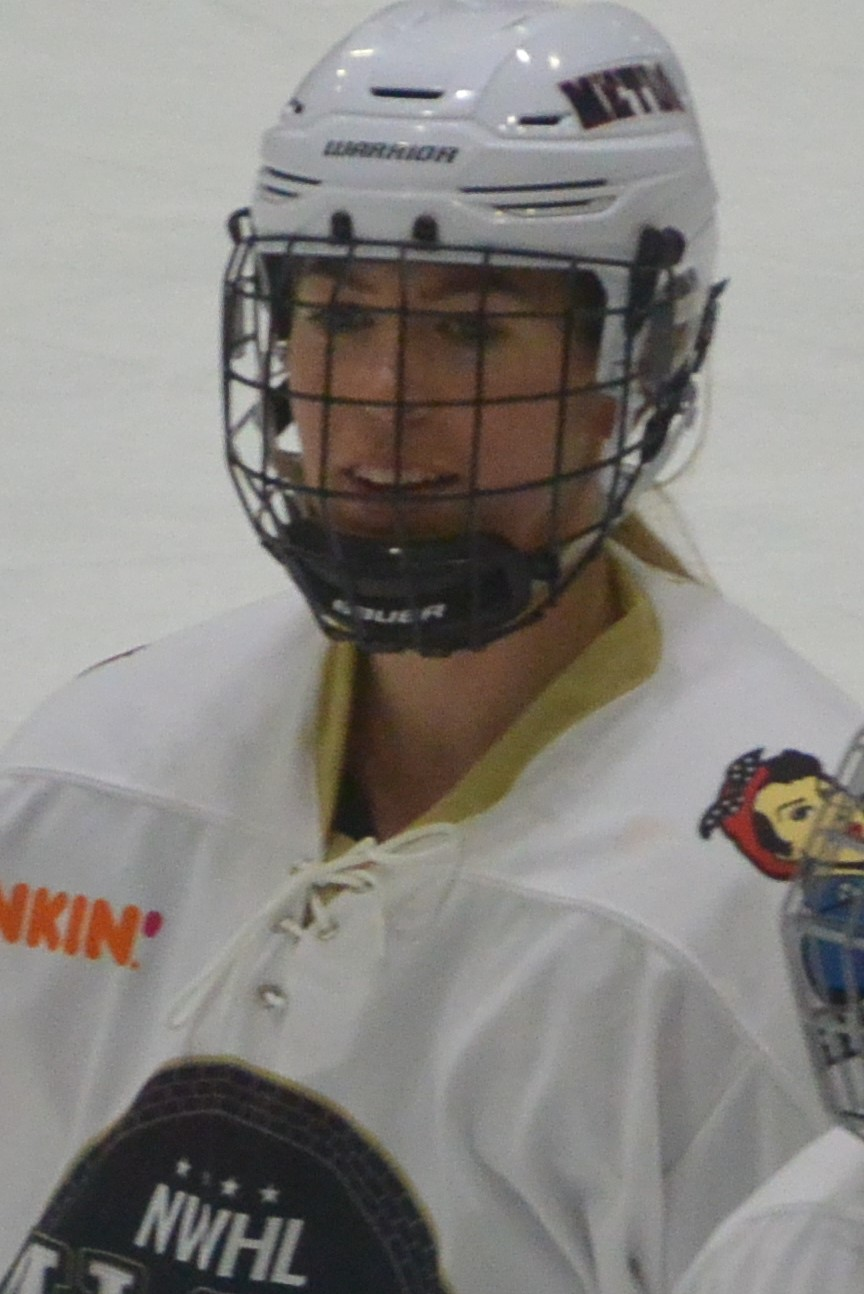
- Rebecca Morse at the 2020 NWHL All Star Game
- Born: March 4, 1992 (age 34) Westfield, New Jersey, United States
- Height: 5 ft 8 in (173 cm)
- Position: Defense
- Shoots: Left
- PHF team Former teams: Connecticut Whale; Metropolitan Riveters; Providence Friars
- Playing career: 2010–present

Rebecca Morse (born March 4, 1992) is an American ice hockey defender, currently playing for the Connecticut Whale of the Premier Hockey Federation (PHF).

== Playing career ==
Morse grew up playing street hockey in the cul-de-sac of her Westfield, New Jersey neighborhood. She soon began taking ice skating lessons and began playing in a local co-ed recreational team, but wouldn't join a competitive hockey team until she was 11 due to a lack of ice hockey programs for girls in her area. During high school, she attended the National Sports Academy in Lake Placid, New York and played four seasons with the school's women's ice hockey team in the Junior Women's Hockey League (JWHL).

From 2010 to 2014, she played NCAA Division I women's ice hockey with the Providence Friars women's ice hockey program of the Hockey East conference, scoring 60 points (16 goals + 44 assists) across 136 games played. As a freshman, she was named the February 2011 Hockey East Rookie of the Month and was selected for the Hockey East All-Rookie Team. In 2013, she was named a All-Hockey East Honorable Mention on defense.

After her career with the Friars concluded, she took a few years off from playing hockey to complete her master’s degree, before returning to sign as a practice player with the New York Riveters (renamed Metropolitan Riveters in 2017) for the 2016–17 NWHL season. She moved up to becoming a roster player for the team in the 2017–18 season, in which she picked up her first career NWHL goal and helped the Riveters to their first Isobel Cup victory.

She was named an alternate captain for the Riveters ahead of the 2019–20 season. That year, her fourth in the NWHL, she was named to the All-Star Game for the first time, with a career-high 11 points in 24 games, leading all Riveters defenders in scoring, and was honoured with the NWHL Foundation Award.

Morse re-signed with the Riveters for the 2020–21 NWHL season.

On August 11, 2021, Morse signed with the Connecticut Whale of the NWHL (later renamed PHF) for the 2021–22 PHF season after playing 5 seasons with the Metropolitan Riveters.

== Personal life ==
Morse's hockey nickname is "Moose" and her teammates regularly refer to her as such in interviews.

She has a bachelor’s degree in marketing and an MBA from Providence College. Outside of hockey, she worked full-time in marketing in Manhattan until she laid off when her role was cut due to the COVID-19 pandemic and its financial implications for her employer. She served as a communications intern for the New Jersey Devils in 2015.

She has been a resident of Roselle, New Jersey.

Morse is an out lesbian and is an outspoken advocate for LGBT rights and racial justice.

== Career statistics ==
			Regular season					Playoffs
Season	Team	League	GP	G	A	Pts	PIM	GP	G	A	Pts	PIM
2016-17	New York Riveters	NWHL	7	0	1	1	2	–	–	–	–	–
2017-18	Metropolitan Riveters	NWHL	13	2	0	2	2	–	–	–	–	–
2018-19	Metropolitan Riveters	NWHL	11	1	0	1	6	2	0	0	0	2
2019-20	Metropolitan Riveters	NWHL	24	4	7	11	34	1	0	0	0	0
2020-21	Metropolitan Riveters	NWHL	3	0	0	0	14	–	–	–	–	–
2021-22	Connecticut Whale	PHF	2	0	0	0	4
NWHL totals			60	7	8	15	48	3	0	0	0	2
