= Maddie Elia =

American ice hockey player (born 1995)

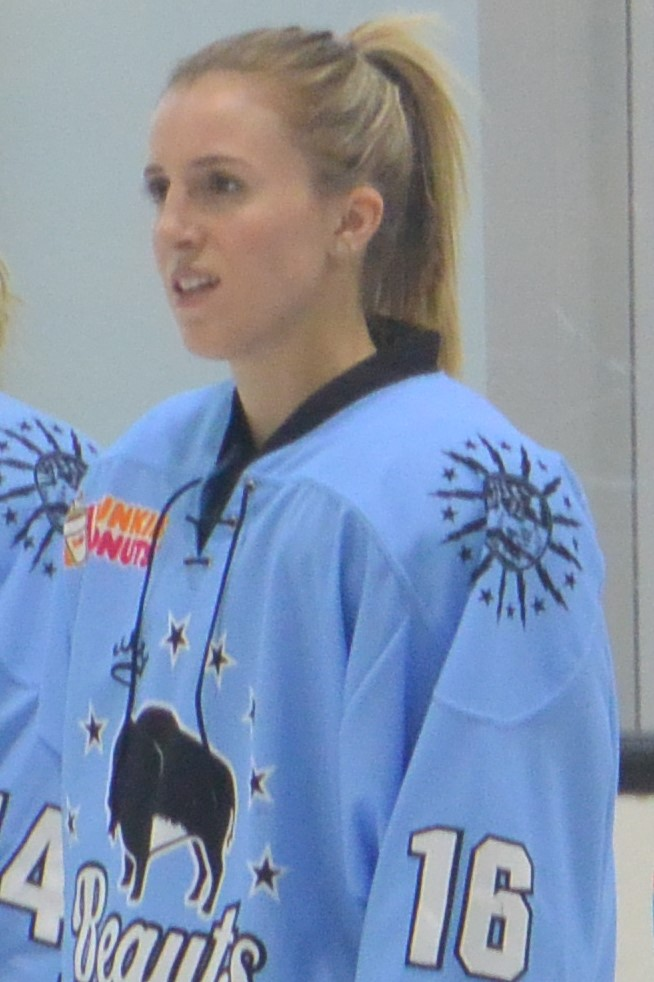
- Maddie Elia with the Buffalo Beauts 11-18-2018
- Born: May 31, 1995 (age 31) Lewiston, New York
- Height: 5 ft 10 in (178 cm)
- Position: Forward
- Shoots: Right
- National team: United States
- Playing career: 2017–present

Maddie Elia (born May 31, 1995) is an ice hockey player from Lewiston, New York. During the 2018–19 NWHL season she was the league's scoring leader and was named NWHL Most Valuable Player (MVP).

== Early life and education ==
Raised in Lewiston, New York, Elia attended Nichols School and began playing ice hockey as a youth. She attended Boston University, where she played for the Boston Terriers from 2013-17.

== Playing career ==
=== Professional hockey ===
==== Buffalo Beauts, 2017–2019 ====
Elia was drafted to the Buffalo Beauts during the 2016 NWHL Draft. During her first season with the Beauts, Elia scored 5 goals and notched 9 assists in 14 games helping the team advance to the playoffs and Isobel Cup final where they were defeated by the Metropolitan Riveters. In June 2018, she signed another one-year contract with the team.

During the 2018–19 NWHL season, Elia led the league in goals and notched 19 points. In seven games, she recorded multi-point games including four points against Minnesota during their Beat's 4-0 win over Minnesota on December 30. She helped lead the team to the playoffs and their third consecutive appearance at the Isobel Cup final where they were defeated by Minnesota in overtime. She was named the league's most valuable player.

== Awards and honors ==
- 2018-19 NWHL Most Valuable Player

Awards and achievements
Preceded by Alexa Gruschow	NWHL Most Valuable Player (MVP); 2019	Succeeded by
