= 2021 NWHL Draft =

General information
- Date: June 29, 2021
- Location: Online
- Network: Twitter

Overview
- League: National Women's Hockey League
- First selection: Taylor Girard, Connecticut Whale

The 2021 NWHL Draft took place on June 29, 2021. With the first pick in the draft, the Connecticut Whale selected Taylor Girard from the Quinnipiac Bobcats.

== Player selections ==
A total of 30 players were drafted, of which 20 were American, seven were Canadian, and one is British, another is Czech, and one is Russian. The following is the breakdown of the 30 players selected by position:

- 15 Forwards
- 14 Defenders
- 1 Goaltender

== Selections ==
Rd	P	Player (Pos)	Team	Nationality	Former team	Notes
1	1	Taylor Girard (F)	Connecticut Whale (via BUF)	United States	Quinnipiac Bobcats	Girard becomes the first Bobcats women's ice hockey alum to be taken first overall in a pro hockey draft
1	2	Emilie Harley (D)	Buffalo Beauts (via CTW)	United States	Robert Morris Colonials	
1	3	Maegan Beres (F)	Toronto Six (Via BOS)	Canada	Boston College Eagles	
1	4	Tatum Skaggs (F)	Toronto Six	United States	Ohio State Buckeyes	WCHA Final Faceoff Most Outstanding Player (2020); Buckeyes goals leader in 2018 and 2019
1	5	Taylor Davison (D)	Toronto Six (via MET)	Canada	York Lions	Davison became the highest drafted player from a U Sports team to be taken in the NWHL Draft.
1	6	Mak Langei (D)	Minnesota Whitecaps	United States	Bemidji State Beavers	
2	7	Anjelica Diffendal (F)	Buffalo Beauts	United States	Robert Morris Colonials	
2	8	Emma Polaski (F)	Connecticut Whale	United States	Syracuse Orange	
2	9	Annie MacDonald (F)	Toronto Six (Via BOS)	Canada	Princeton Tigers	
2	10	Rachel Marmen (D)	Toronto Six	Canada	Mercyhurst Lakers	
2	11	Caroline Ross (D)	Metropolitan Riveters	United States	Colgate Raiders	
2	12	Tina Kampa (D)	Minnesota Whitecaps	United States	Bemidji State Beavers	
3	13	Kennedy Ganser (F)	Buffalo Beauts	Canada	Alberta Pandas	
3	14	Anna Zíková (D)	Buffalo Beauts (via CTW)	Czech Republic	Maine Black Bears	
3	15	Missy Segall (F)	Buffalo Beauts (via BOS)	United States	Hamilton College	
3	16	Leah Marino (F)	Toronto Six	United States	Robert Morris Colonials	
3	17	Julia Scammell (D)	Metropolitan Riveters	Canada	New Hampshire Wildcats	
3	18	Taylor Wente (F)	Minnesota Whitecaps	United States	Minnesota Golden Gophers	
4	19	Allison Attea (D)	Buffalo Beauts	United States	Holy Cross Crusaders	
4	20	Hannah Bates (D)	Connecticut Whale	United States	St. Cloud State Huskies	
4	21	Finley Frechette (F)	Boston Pride	United States	Cornell Big Red	
4	22	Olivia Atkinson (F)	Toronto Six	Canada	Concordia Stingers	
4	23	Jordan Sanislo (D)	Metropolitan Riveters	United States	Sacred Heart Pioneers	
4	24	Jenna Brenneman (G)	Minnesota Whitecaps	United States	Penn State Nittany Lions	
5	25	Casey Traill (D)	Buffalo Beauts	United Kingdom	Castleton University	
5	26	Grace Middleton (F)	Connecticut Whale	United States	New Hampshire Wildcats	
5	27	Abby Nearis (F)	Boston Pride	United States	Brown Bears	
5	28	Daria Tereshkina (D)	Toronto Six	Russia	Maine Black Bears	
5	29	Morgan Schauer (D)	Metropolitan Riveters	United States	LIU Sharks	
5	30	Kendall Williamson (F)	Minnesota Whitecaps	United States	Colgate Raiders	

== Trades involving draft picks ==
The following trades were made and resulted in exchanges of draft picks between the teams.

- To complete the trade from April 28, 2020: Boston Pride to Toronto Six - The Pride obtained the first overall pick of the 2020 NWHL Draft. In exchange, Toronto received Boston's 2020 first round pick (6th overall), plus their first and second round picks in this draft. It was also the first trade in Toronto Six franchise history.

== International Draft ==
A draft of international players was held on July 25, 2021.

Player	Position	Team	Nationality	Former team
Lovisa Berndtsson	Goaltender	Buffalo Beauts	Sweden	Djurgårdens IF (SDHL)
Tsubasa Sato	Forward	Connecticut Whale	Japan	Karuizawa Fairies
Evelina Raselli	Forward	Boston Pride	Switzerland	Ladies Team Lugano (SWHL A)
Réka Dabasi	Forward	Toronto Six	Hungary	KMH Budapest (EWHL)
Romana Košecká	Forward/Defense	Metropolitan Riveters	Slovakia	ŠKP Bratislava (EWHL)
Fanni Gasparics	Forward	Minnesota Whitecaps	Hungary	MAC Budapest (EWHL)
