= Taylor Girard =

American ice hockey player (born 1998)

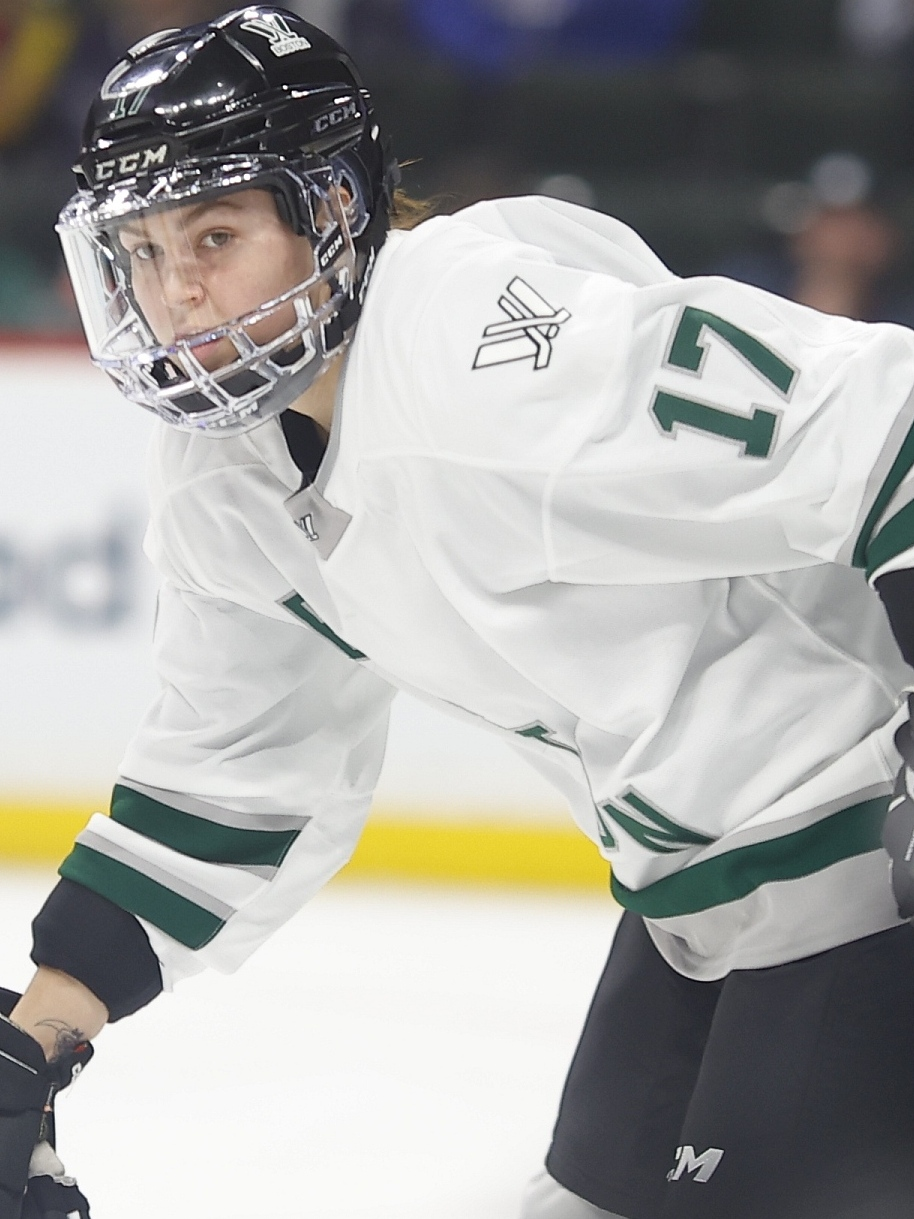
- Girard with PWHL Boston in 2024
- Born: July 17, 1998 (age 28) Macomb Township, Michigan, U.S.
- Height: 5 ft 10 in (178 cm)
- Weight: 115 lb (52 kg; 8 st 3 lb)
- Position: Forward
- Shoots: Left
- PWHL team Former teams: Detroit Clutch; Connecticut Whale; Boston Fleet; New York Sirens
- Playing career: 2016–present

Taylor Girard (born July 17, 1998) is an American professional ice hockey forward for the Detroit Clutch in the Professional Women's Hockey League (PWHL). She previously played for the New York Sirens and the Boston Fleet of the PWHL and Connecticut Whale of the Premier Hockey Federation (PHF). She was drafted first overall in the 2021 NWHL Draft.

== Playing career ==
=== College ===
Girard began her collegiate hockey career for Lindenwood during the 2016–17 season. During her freshman year, she recorded three goals and one assist in 33 games. She scored her first career goal and point on October 1, 2016, in a game against Minnesota. She was one of five players to appear in all 33 games and led the team with 80 shots on goal. During the 2017–18 season in her sophomore year, she recorded 13 goals and 11 assists in 25 games. She led the team in goals (13) and points (24). She was named the CHA Player of the Month for the month of December 2017, after she led Lindenwood with three goals and two assists during the Lion's four games in the month. Following the season she was named first-team all-CHA. During the 2018–19 season in her junior year, she recorded three goals and four assists in eight games.

On May 20, 2019, Girard announced she was transferring to Quinnipiac. She finished her career at Lindendwood with 19 goals and 16 assists in 66 games. During the 2019–20 season in her redshirt junior year, she recorded six goals and 12 assists in 24 games. During the 2020–21 season in her senior year, she recorded seven goals and nine assists in 15 games, and ranked second on the team in scoring. She finished her collegiate career with 32 goals and 37 assists in 105 games.

=== Professional ===
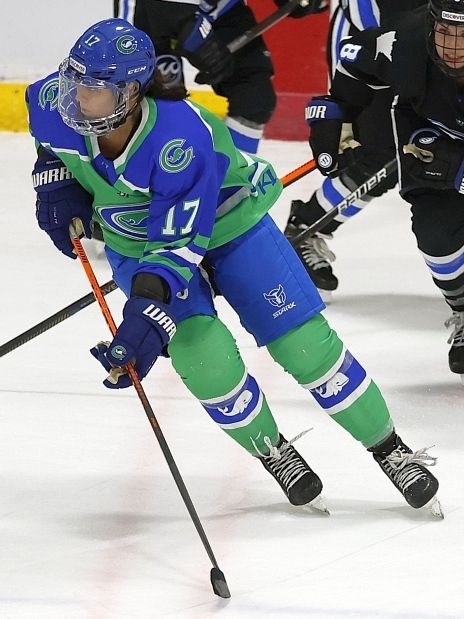
Girard with the Connecticut Whale in 2023

On June 29, 2021, Girard was drafted first overall by the Connecticut Whale in the 2021 NWHL Draft. On July 15, 2021, she signed with the Whale. During the 2021–22 season in her rookie year, she recorded 11 goals and 13 assists in 20 games and was named the PHF Newcomer of the Year. She finished the season tied for third in points (24), sixth in goals (11), tied for fifth in assists (13), and tied for second in game-winning goals (4).

During the 2022–23 season, she recorded ten goals and 18 assists in 24 games. She led the league in short-handed goals (4) and ranked in the top four in the PHF in points (28), assists (18), and power play goals (4). On May 10, 2023, the Whale and Girard renegotiated her contract, agreeing to a $110,000 contract for the 2023–24 season. The PHF ceased operations on June 29, 2023.

On September 18, 2023, Girard was drafted 51st overall by PWHL Boston in the 2023 PWHL Draft. On November 8, 2023, she signed a two-year contract with Boston. During the 2023–24 season, she recorded four goals and two assists in 23 regular season games. On April 27, 2024, she suffered a season-ending injury in a game against PWHL Minnesota, and missed the playoffs.

On January 20, 2025, Girard was traded from the Boston Fleet to the New York Sirens in exchange for Jill Saulnier. Prior to being traded she was scoreless in five games for the Fleet. She would finish the season with one goal and three points in 23 games between the two teams. On June 18, 2025, she signed a one-year contract extension with the Sirens. On November 22, 2025, during a game against the Ottawa Charge, Girard recorded a natural hat trick in the third period, scoring all three goals on Gwyneth Phillips. She became the second player in PWHL history to record a natural hat trick, and the first player to score three goals in a single period. During the 2025–26 season, she recorded a career-high seven goals and one assist in 17 games.

During the league's expansion to 12 teams ahead of the 2026–27 season, she signed a two-year contract with the Detroit Clutch on June 11, 2026. She became the first Michigan native signed by the team.

== Career statistics ==
			Regular season					Playoffs
Season	Team	League	GP	G	A	Pts	PIM	GP	G	A	Pts	PIM
2016–17	Lindenwood University	CHA	33	3	1	4	33	—	—	—	—	—
2017–18	Lindenwood University	CHA	25	13	11	24	26	—	—	—	—	—
2018–19	Lindenwood University	CHA	8	3	4	7	2	—	—	—	—	—
2019–20	Quinnipiac University	ECAC	24	6	12	18	20	—	—	—	—	—
2020–21	Quinnipiac University	ECAC	15	7	9	16	4	—	—	—	—	—
2021–22	Connecticut Whale	PHF	20	11	13	24	14	2	1	1	2	0
2022–23	Connecticut Whale	PHF	24	10	18	28	16	3	3	1	4	0
2023–24	PWHL Boston	PWHL	23	4	2	6	4	—	—	—	—	—
2024–25	Boston Fleet	PWHL	5	0	0	0	0	—	—	—	—	—
2024–25	New York Sirens	PWHL	18	1	2	3	10	—	—	—	—	—
2025–26	New York Sirens	PWHL	17	7	1	8	34	—	—	—	—	—
PHF totals			44	21	31	52	30	5	4	2	6	0
PWHL totals			63	12	5	17	54	—	—	—	—	—

== Awards and honors ==
Honors	Year	Ref
College
All-CHA First Team	2018	
PHF
Newcomer of the Year	2022	
All-Star Game	2022, 2023	
