= Emma Ruggiero =

American ice hockey player

- Born: April 12, 1997 (age 28) Amherst, New York, United States
- Height: 5 ft 1 in (155 cm)
- Position: Forward
- Shoots: Left
- NWHL team Former teams: Buffalo Beauts; Buffalo State Bengals
- Playing career: 2015–present

Emma Ruggiero (born April 12, 1997) is an American ice hockey forward, currently playing with the Buffalo Beauts of the National Women's Hockey League (NWHL).

== Career ==
During high school, she played with the Buffalo Regals.

From 2015 to 2019, she attended Buffalo State College, scoring 52 points across 100 NCAA Division III games. She served as team captain in her senior year.

In August 2019, she signed her first professional contract with the NWHL's Buffalo Beauts after trying-out in the Beauts' Free Agent Camp. After missing the first seven games of the season as a healthy scratch, she made her professional debut on November 23, 2019, against the Minnesota Whitecaps. She picked up one assist in ten games in her rookie NWHL season and was a recipient of the 2020 NWHL Foundation Award.

=== Style of play ===
Noted for her speed and her tenacious forechecking, she has been described by Nate Oliver (prior to his becoming Beauts general manager) as "a spitfire on skates who barrels into corners with a devil-may-care style."

== Personal life ==
During the 2019–20 season, she also served as a coach in the Western New York Girls' Varsity Ice Hockey Federation. Her sister, Abby Ruggiero, currently plays hockey for the Cornell Big Red.

== Career statistics ==
			Regular season					Playoffs
Season	Team	League	GP	G	A	Pts	PIM	GP	G	A	Pts	PIM
2015–16	Buffalo State Bengals	NCAA Division III	26	4	7	11	20	–	–	–	–	–
2016–17	Buffalo State Bengals	NCAA Division III	23	3	2	5	14	–	–	–	–	–
2017–18	Buffalo State Bengals	NCAA Division III	26	7	5	12	32	–	–	–	–	–
2018–19	Buffalo State Bengals	NCAA Division III	25	14	10	24	53	–	–	–	–	–
2019–20	Buffalo Beauts	NWHL	10	0	1	1	4	–	–	–	–	–
NWHL totals			10	0	1	1	4	–	–	–	–	–
