= 2018–19 NWHL season =

- League: National Women's Hockey League
- Sport: Ice hockey

Regular season
- Season champions: Minnesota Whitecaps
- Season MVP: Maddie Elia (Buffalo)
- Top scorer: Hayley Scamurra (Buffalo)

Isobel Cup
- Champions: Minnesota Whitecaps
- Runners-up: Buffalo Beauts
- Finals MVP: Lee Stecklein (Minnesota)

NWHL seasons
- 2017–18 2019–20

The 2018–19 NWHL season is the fourth season of the National Women's Hockey League. All four teams from the previous three seasons returned: the Boston Pride, Buffalo Beauts, Connecticut Whale, and the Metropolitan Riveters while the Minnesota Whitecaps entered the league as an expansion team bringing the league to five teams.

== League news and notes ==
- This is the first full season of the Buffalo Beauts being owned and controlled by Pegula Sports and Entertainment, the owners of the Buffalo Sabres NHL team, instead of the league. The Beauts took part in a doubleheader event immediately before a Sabres game on December 29, 2018, at KeyBank Center.
- On May 15, 2018, the league announced its first expansion franchise; the Minnesota Whitecaps had been purchased by the league and had joined the NWHL for the 2018–19 season. The Whitecaps had played in the Western Women's Hockey League (WWHL) from 2004 to 2011 and then operated independently from any league after the WWHL ceased operations, including playing a few exhibition games against other NWHL teams during the inaugural 2015–16 season.
- On August 13, 2018, the Minnesota Wild revealed its partnership with the Whitecaps. As part of a cross-promotional marketing agreement, the Whitecaps' home opener on October 6 at the TRIA Rink, the Wild's practice facility, became part of a doubleheader to take place before the Wild's home opener at the Xcel Energy Center.
- August 21, 2018: The Whitecaps' new logo and colors of blue, while, silver and black were unveiled.
- September 29, 2018: The Champions Cup was played between the NWHL's 2018 Isobel Cup champion Metropolitan Riveters and the Swedish Women's Hockey League (SDHL) 2018 champion Luleå HF at Hobey Baker Memorial Rink in Princeton, New Jersey. Luleå defeated the Riveters 4–2. The game had been originally scheduled to take place at Norrbotten Arena in Sweden, but scheduling challenges forced a relocation. Luleå
- January 10, 2019: The Boston Pride and the NHL's Boston Bruins announced a partnership to further promote women's hockey in Massachusetts. The partnership makes the Pride the fourth NWHL to become officially associated with an NHL team.
- At the conclusion of the season, the league had set new attendance records with 16 sold out games, led by the Whitecaps selling out all ten home games including the playoffs.

=== One league movement ===
Starting in March 2018 and throughout the off-season, current and former players took to social media to promote the concept of one unified professional women's hockey league between the NWHL and the Canadian Women's Hockey League. Players utilized the hashtag #OneLeague to indicate their support. The push continued during the NWHL All-Star Game.

=== Head coaching and front office personnel changes ===
==== Head coaches ====
Team	2017–18 head coach	2018–19 replacement	Notes
Boston Pride	Thomas Pöck	Paul Mara	Mara was named head coach of the Boston Pride on May 30, 2018.
Metropolitan Riveters	Chad Wiseman	Randy Velischek	Wiseman left to be closer to home and took the head coaching position with the junior A Burlington Cougars, but was then hired to the coaching staff of the OHL's Guelph Storm. Velischek was hired on September 20.
Buffalo Beauts	Ric Seiling	Cody McCormick	Seiling was fired December 7, 2018. McCormick, who like Seiling is a former player for the Buffalo Sabres, was named as the new head coach for the remainder of the season.

=== All-Star Game ===
The 2019 NWHL All-Star Game and its Weekend festivities took place on February 9–10, 2019, at Bridgestone Arena in Nashville.

The skills challenge took place on February 9 at the Ford Ice Center, the Nashville Predators' practice facility, in front of a sell-out crowd. Kendall Coyne Schofield of the Minnesota Whitecaps won the fastest skater, two weeks following her appearance as the first woman to compete in the NHL's Skills Competition as part of the 2019 National Hockey League All-Star Game also in the fastest skater competition. Meanwhile, three Buffalo Beauts teammates won the other skills challenge events: Blake Bolden had the hardest shot, Nicole Hensley won the fastest goalie competition, and Dani Cameranesi captured the accuracy shooting title.

The All-Star Game took place on February 10 immediately following a game between the NHL's St. Louis Blues and the Nashville Predators at Bridgestone Arena. The game was a four-on-four format between teams led by Shannon Szabados and Lee Stecklein, with Team Szabados winning 3–2 following a shootout. The game set an attendance record with 6,120 at the arena.

== Regular season ==
=== Standings ===
Final standings.

	GP	W	L	OTL	PTS	GF	GA
Minnesota Whitecaps	16	12	4	0	24	53	34
Buffalo Beauts	16	11	4	1	23	57	25
Boston Pride	16	11	5	0	22	60	36
Metropolitan Riveters	16	4	12	0	8	32	65
Connecticut Whale	16	2	12	2	6	22	64

=== Schedule ===
- All regular season games were scheduled to be contested on Saturdays and Sundays. There is one neutral-site game in Pittsburgh on December 2 with the Connecticut Whale as the home team against the Metropolitan Riveters at the UPMC Lemieux Sports Complex.
- On December 29, 2018, the Whitecaps faced the Beauts at the KeyBank Center as part of a doubleheader involving both the NWHL and the NHL. After the NWHL game, the Buffalo Sabres hosted the Boston Bruins.

Regular season schedule
Date	Visitor	Score	Home	OT	Decision	Notes
October 6	Metropolitan Riveters	0–4	Minnesota Whitecaps		Amanda Leveille	Attendance: 1,200
October 7	Metropolitan Riveters	1–3	Minnesota Whitecaps		Amanda Leveille	Attendance: 1,200
October 7	Buffalo Beauts	4–0	Connecticut Whale		Nicole Hensley	
October 13	Connecticut Whale	0–7	Buffalo Beauts		Shannon Szabados	
October 13	Metropolitan Riveters	1–5	Boston Pride		Katie Burt	
October 20	Minnesota Whitecaps	5–3	Metropolitan Riveters		Amanda Leveille	
October 20	Connecticut Whale	2–4	Boston Pride		Katie Burt	
October 21	Minnesota Whitecaps	6–2	Metropolitan Riveters		Amanda Leveille	
October 27	Buffalo Beauts	2–3	Minnesota Whitecaps		Amanda Leveille	
October 27	Metropolitan Riveters	3–2	Boston Pride		Katie Fitzgerald	
October 28	Buffalo Beauts	1–2	Minnesota Whitecaps		Amanda Leveille	
November 17	Buffalo Beauts	1–4	Boston Pride		Katie Burt	
November 18	Connecticut Whale	2–1	Metropolitan Riveters		Meeri Räisänen	
November 18	Buffalo Beauts	5–2	Boston Pride		Shannon Szabados	
November 25	Connecticut Whale	3–4	Metropolitan Riveters	SO	Kimberly Sass	
December 1	Boston Pride	5–1	Minnesota Whitecaps		Katie Burt	
December 2	Boston Pride	7–2	Minnesota Whitecaps		Katie Burt	
December 2	Metropolitan Riveters	0–4	Connecticut Whale		Meeri Räisänen	at UPMC Lemieux Sports Complex
December 8	Connecticut Whale	1–3	Buffalo Beauts		Shannon Szabados	
December 9	Boston Pride	5–2	Metropolitan Riveters		Katie Burt	
December 29	Minnesota Whitecaps	2–1	Buffalo Beauts		Amanda Leveille	at KeyBank Center
December 30	Minnesota Whitecaps	0–4	Buffalo Beauts		Nicole Hensley	
December 30	Boston Pride	2–1	Connecticut Whale	OT	Katie Burt	
January 5	Boston Pride	0–5	Buffalo Beauts		Shannon Szabados	
January 6	Metropolitan Riveters	6–3	Connecticut Whale		Maria Sorokina	
January 12	Metropolitan Riveters	1–5	Buffalo Beauts		Nicole Hensley	
January 12	Minnesota Whitecaps	4–5	Boston Pride		Katie Burt	
January 13	Minnesota Whitecaps	4–1	Connecticut Whale		Amanda Leveille	
January 19	Connecticut Whale	0–2	Minnesota Whitecaps		Amanda Leveille	
January 20	Boston Pride	—	Metropolitan Riveters			Game postponed due to weather
January 20	Connecticut Whale	0–9	Minnesota Whitecaps		Julie Friend	
January 26	Boston Pride	1–4	Buffalo Beauts		Shannon Szabados	
February 2	Buffalo Beauts	3–2	Metropolitan Riveters		Nicole Hensley	
February 2	Connecticut Whale	1–3	Boston Pride		Katie Burt	
February 18	Boston Pride	8–1	Metropolitan Riveters		Katie Burt	Rescheduled game from January 20
February 23	Metropolitan Riveters	1–4	Buffalo Beauts		Shannon Szabados	
February 24	Boston Pride	6–1	Connecticut Whale		Katie Burt	
March 2	Buffalo Beauts	5–2	Connecticut Whale		Nicole Hensley	
March 2	Minnesota Whitecaps	2–1	Boston Pride		Amanda Leveille	
March 3	Buffalo Beauts	3–4	Metropolitan Riveters	SO	Katie Fitzgerald	
March 3	Minnesota Whitecaps	4–1	Connecticut Whale		Amanda Leveille	

== Playoffs ==
Play-in game March 7
4	Metropolitan	5
5	Connecticut	2

Semifinal game March 9 & 15 (Note: Semifinal game between the Whitecaps and Riveters was originally scheduled for March 10 but was postponed due to weather-related travel issues.)
1	Minnesota	5
4	Metropolitan	1
2	Buffalo	4
3	Boston	0

Isobel Cup Championship; March 17
1	Minnesota	2 OT
2	Buffalo	1

== Awards and honors ==
- Maddie Elia, Buffalo Beauts, 2019 Most Valuable Player
- Hayley Scamurra, Buffalo Beauts, 2019 Players' Top Player of the Year
- Shannon Szabados, Buffalo Beauts, 2019 Goaltender of the Year
- Blake Bolden, Buffalo Beauts, 2019 Defender of the Year
- Hayley Scamurra, Buffalo Beauts, 2019 Scoring Champion
- Jillian Dempsey, Boston Pride, 2019 Denna Laing Award
- Jonna Curtis, Minnesota Whitecaps, 2019 Newcomer of the Year

=== Regular season weekly awards ===
VEDA NWHL Player of the Week
Player	Team	Date
Hannah Brandt	Minnesota Whitecaps	October 8, 2018
Lexi Bender	Boston Pride	October 15, 2018
Jonna Curtis	Minnesota Whitecaps	October 22, 2018
Amanda Leveille	Minnesota Whitecaps	October 29, 2018
Meeri Räisänen	Connecticut Whale	November 19, 2018
Hayley Scamurra	Buffalo Beauts	November 19, 2018
Audra Richards	Metropolitan Riveters	November 26, 2018
Gigi Marvin	Boston Pride	December 3, 2018
Kaleigh Fratkin	Boston Pride	December 10, 2018
Maddie Elia	Buffalo Beauts	January 2, 2019
Madison Packer	Metropolitan Riveters	January 7, 2019
Shannon Szabados	Buffalo Beauts	January 7, 2019
Amy Menke	Minnesota Whitecaps	January 14, 2019
Dani Cameranesi	Buffalo Beauts	January 29, 2019
Blake Bolden	Buffalo Beauts	February 4, 2019
Denisa Krizova	Boston Pride	February 4, 2019
Emily Janiga	Buffalo Beauts	February 25, 2019

VEDA NWHL Stars of the Week
Stars	Team	Date
Minnesota Whitecaps fans	Minnesota Whitecaps	January 22, 2019

== Transactions ==
=== Retirement ===
Player	Date	Last team
Marissa Gedman	August 23, 2018	Boston Pride

=== Signings ===
Player	Date	Team
Dani Cameranesi	June 12, 2018	Buffalo Beauts
Nicole Hensley	June 13, 2018	Buffalo Beauts
Amanda Leveille	June 18, 2018	Minnesota Whitecaps
Hannah Brandt	June 20, 2018	Minnesota Whitecaps
Lee Stecklein	June 20, 2018	Minnesota Whitecaps
Katie Burt	June 25, 2018	Boston Pride
Shannon Szabados	June 27, 2018	Buffalo Beauts
Toni Ann Miano	July 2, 2018	Boston Pride
Audra Richards	July 9, 2018	Metropolitan Riveters
Randi Griffin	July 10, 2018	Connecticut Whale
Sara Hughson	July 10, 2018	Connecticut Whale
Michelle Löwenhielm	July 10, 2018	Connecticut Whale
Sam Walther	July 10, 2018	Connecticut Whale
Katerina Mrázová	July 11, 2018	Connecticut Whale
Miye D'Oench	July 24, 2018	Metropolitan Riveters
Chelsea Ziadie	July 24, 2018	Metropolitan Riveters
Kendall Coyne Schofield	July 26, 2018	Minnesota Whitecaps
Lauren Kelly	July 31, 2018	Boston Pride
Kristin Lewicki	July 31, 2018	Metropolitan Riveters
Allie Thunstrom	August 1, 2018	Minnesota Whitecaps
Denisa Křížová	August 2, 2018	Boston Pride
Kaleigh Fratkin	August 8, 2018	Boston Pride
Meghan Pezon	August 8, 2018	Minnesota Whitecaps
Fiona McKenna	August 10, 2018	Metropolitan Riveters
Amanda Boulier	August 14, 2018	Minnesota Whitecaps
Lexi Slattery	August 14, 2018	Metropolitan Riveters
Blake Bolden	August 15, 2018	Buffalo Beauts
Jonna Curtis	August 15, 2018	Minnesota Whitecaps
Mallory Souliotis	August 15, 2018	Boston Pride
Sarah Schwenzfeier	August 16, 2018	Connecticut Whale
Nina Rodgers	August 16, 2018	Connecticut Whale
Brooke White-Lancette	August 17, 2018	Minnesota Whitecaps
McKenna Brand	August 17, 2018	Boston Pride
Sydney Rossman	August 20, 2018	Minnesota Whitecaps
Lauren Barnes	August 22, 2018	Minnesota Whitecaps
Julie Friend	August 22, 2018	Minnesota Whitecaps
Sadie Lundquist	August 22, 2018	Minnesota Whitecaps
Amy Menke	August 22, 2018	Minnesota Whitecaps
Emma Stauber	August 22, 2018	Minnesota Whitecaps
Taylor Wasylk	August 23, 2018	Boston Pride
Gigi Marvin	August 24, 2018	Boston Pride
