= Premier Hockey Federation =

Former North American professional women's ice hockey league

- Most recent season or competition: 2022–23 PHF season
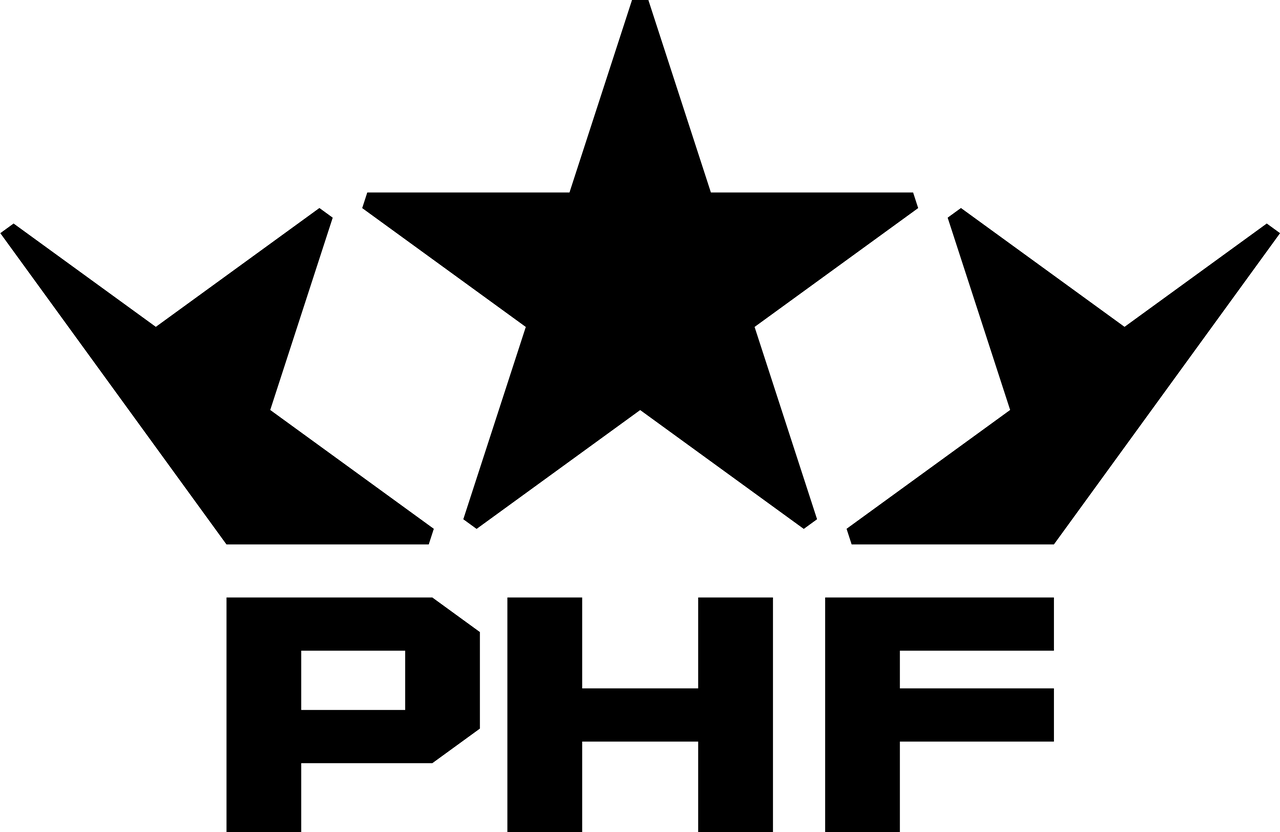
- Formerly: National Women's Hockey League (2015–2021)
- Sport: Ice hockey
- Founded: March 2015
- Folded: June 2023
- Replaced by: Professional Women's Hockey League
- Commissioner: Reagan Carey
- No. of teams: 7
- Countries: Canada (2 teams); United States (5 teams)
- Headquarters: New York City, United States
- Last champion: Toronto Six
- Most titles: Boston Pride (3 titles)
- Broadcasters: ESPN+ TSN
- Website: premierhockeyfederation.com

The Premier Hockey Federation (PHF) was a women's professional ice hockey league in the United States and Canada that operated from March 2015 until June 2023. The league was established in 2015 as the National Women's Hockey League (NWHL), comprising four league-owned teams. Over time, some teams gained independent ownership and the number of teams grew to seven; teams during the league's final season in 2022–23 included the Boston Pride, Buffalo Beauts, Connecticut Whale, Metropolitan Riveters, Minnesota Whitecaps, Montreal Force, and Toronto Six. The Isobel Cup was awarded annually to the league playoff champion.

The PHF ceased operations on June 29, 2023, after the league and its intellectual properties were purchased by Mark Walter Group and BJK Enterprises, led by Mark Walter and Billie Jean King, respectively. Both businesses had entered a partnership with the Professional Women's Hockey Players Association (PWHPA) in May 2022, with the intent to create a new, unified professional women's ice hockey league in North America. On August 29, 2023, the partners announced the formation of the Professional Women's Hockey League (PWHL), which began play in January 2024.

== History ==
=== Foundation and inaugural season (2015–2016) ===
The National Women's Hockey League (NWHL) was formed by Dani Rylan in March 2015 with an estimated $2.5 million operating budget. It was the first professional women's hockey league to pay its players salaries. Prior to the league's formation, the top level of women's hockey in North America was the Canadian Women's Hockey League (CWHL), a non-profit league that covered team costs and offered bonuses and incentives but not salaries. Rylan had been in discussions with the CWHL about founding a New York-based expansion franchise before opting to build a new league in the U.S. instead. The league's inaugural season in 2015–16 ran on a salary cap of US$270,000, with a $10,000 minimum per player. Players also earned 15% of profits from NWHL jerseys sold with their name on them. The league placed its four original teams in markets with high levels of female youth participation in ice hockey: the New York City area, Buffalo, and New England. Rylan did not disclose the league's initial investors or how much had been invested. Canadian Joel Leonoff, CEO of Paysafe Group and father of Connecticut Whale goaltender Jaimie Leonoff, later spoke about his investment in the league but declined to reveal specifics.

The inaugural NWHL Draft took place in Boston in June 2015, with each team selecting five collegiate athletes. The league held tryout camps in various locales in Canada, along with an international player camp in Boston. The league attracted many top-level U.S. national team stars from the CWHL, such as Hilary Knight and former Team USA captain Meghan Duggan, top graduating players from the NCAA, and international players.

In December 2015, the league signed its first league-wide sponsorship deal, a multi-year deal with Dunkin' Donuts. On December 31, 2015, the Boston Pride played the CWHL's Les Canadiennes de Montréal to a 1–1 tie in the first Women's Winter Classic, one day before the 2016 NHL Winter Classic and at the same site, Gillette Stadium in Foxborough, Massachusetts. It was the first outdoor professional women's hockey game ever held, and the first game between the NWHL and CWHL. The 1st NWHL All-Star Game took place on January 24, 2016, in Buffalo. The game featured a 4-on-4 format with Hilary Knight of the Boston Pride and Emily Pfalzer of the Buffalo Beauts serving as team captains.

On March 12, 2016, the Boston Pride became the first Isobel Cup champions with a 3–1 win over the Buffalo Beauts to secure a 2–0 series win.

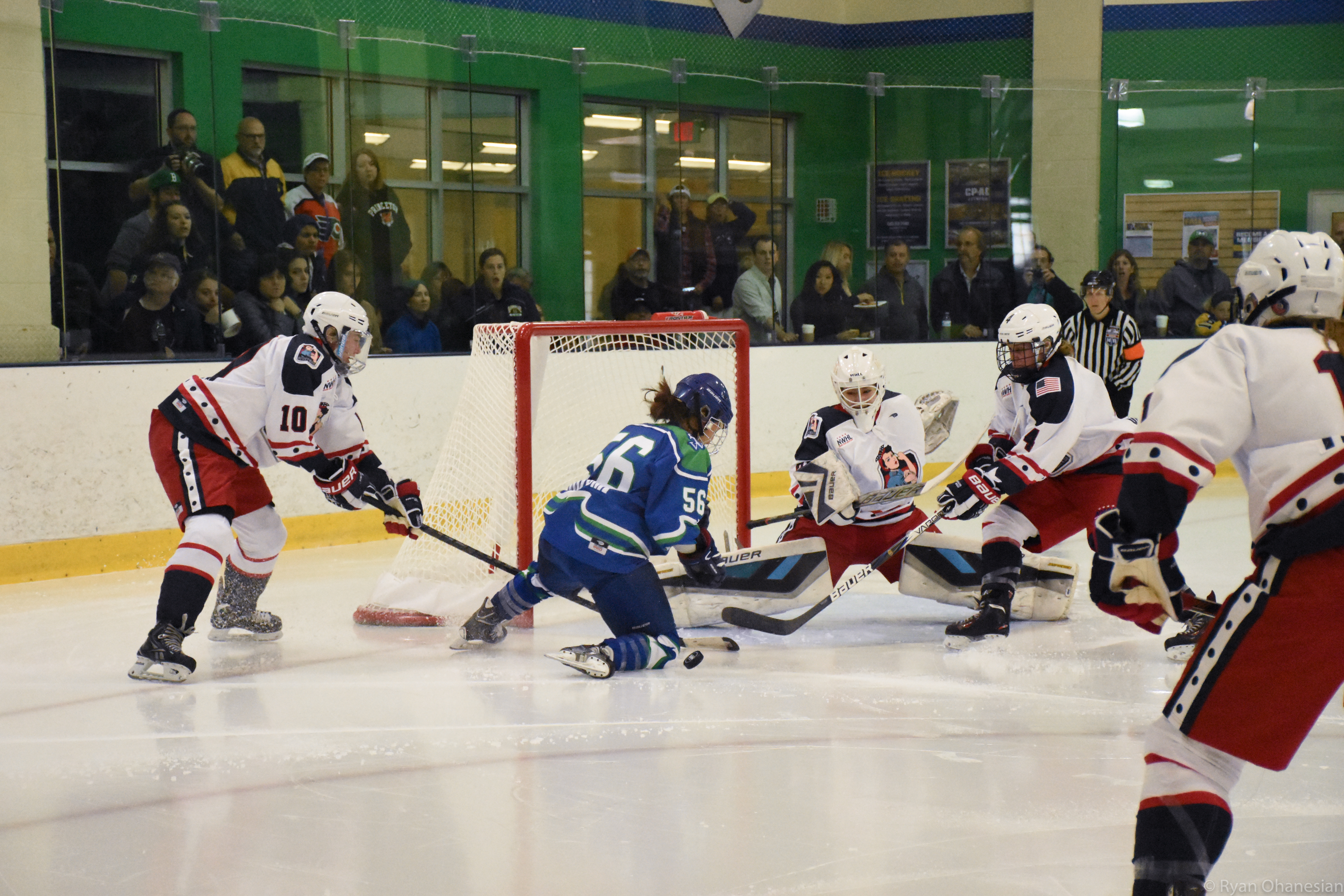
NWHL action between the Whale and Riveters during the inaugural season.

=== Structural changes and NHL partnerships (2016–2019) ===
On August 4, 2016, the league announced each team would introduce new uniform designs voted on by fans. Two days earlier, the league announced a partnership with You Can Play, an organization dedicated to eradicating homophobia in sport. Each team in the league hosted a You Can Play athlete-ambassador, and would begin to develop a policy in regards to transgender players. This initiative was in response to the October 2016 announcement that Buffalo Beauts player Harrison Browne was transgender—the first openly transgender athlete in professional American team sports.

On November 17, 2016, part way into the league's second season, the NWHL informed players that they would receive up to a 50% pay cut. This decreased the league minimum salary to $5,000. Five weeks later, in an attempt to partially compensate for the salary rollback, the league introduced an incentive program where players split revenue generated by tickets sold in excess of 500 after each game.

In September 2017, the league joined 16 other international hockey organizations in formally adopting the NHL's Declaration of Principles, with the goal of advancing teaching, policies, and programs to strengthen hockey communities around the world.

In October 2017, the New Jersey Devils of the National Hockey League (NHL) partnered with the Riveters, becoming the first NHL team to partner with an NWHL team. The three-year partnership provided facilities for Riveters games and practices, and assisted with sponsorships, marketing, and tickets; some Riveters games were broadcast on The One Jersey Network, the Devils' digital radio station as well. The Riveters changed their name from the New York to the Metropolitan Riveters and adopted the Devils' colors. As part of the new affiliation, the Riveters and Devils held a doubleheader at the Prudential Center for the Riveters' 2017–18 season opener against the Boston Pride, followed by the Devils' game against the Arizona Coyotes.

On December 21, 2017, the Buffalo Beauts were acquired by Pegula Sports and Entertainment, owners of the NHL's Buffalo Sabres, the Rochester Americans, and the Beauts' arena, the HarborCenter. The Beauts thus became the second NWHL team to become affiliated with an NHL franchise—and the first professional women's team to be owned by an NHL team owner—as well as the first NWHL franchise outside league ownership.

On May 15, 2018, the league announced its first expansion franchise, the Minnesota Whitecaps, would join the league for the 2018–19 season. The Whitecaps had played in the Western Women's Hockey League (WWHL) from 2004 to 2011. Following the WWHL's closure, the team played independently, including exhibition games against NWHL teams during the inaugural 2015–16 season. The Whitecaps signed a partnership agreement with the NHL's Minnesota Wild, with whom the Whitecaps had already cooperated as an independent, in the 2018 off-season. The Whitecaps were the second privately operated franchise in the NWHL.

In August 2018, the NWHL also began an affiliation program with youth hockey organizations, called the Jr. NWHL, to promote growth in girl's and women's hockey.

After a call for more transparency, the league announced it would reveal some league investors and their stories over the 2018–19 season. The first league investor to be revealed was Neil Leibman, co-owner of the Texas Rangers of Major League Baseball. The second announced was Lee Heffernan, a marketing executive.

In January 2019, the Boston Pride and the NHL's Boston Bruins officially became promotional partners, making the Pride the fourth NWHL team associated with an NHL team. During the 2018–19 season, commissioner Rylan stated that the Minnesota Whitecaps were the first NWHL team to turn a profit.

=== CWHL dissolution and aftermath (2019–2021) ===
On March 31, 2019, it was announced that the Canadian Women's Hockey League (CWHL) board of directors had decided to discontinue operations effective May 1, 2019. Early in 2019, NWHL commissioner Rylan had been in talks with the CWHL about a possible merger. In response to the CWHL's abrupt folding, The Athletic reported that the NWHL was exploring Canadian expansion to fill the markets left by the CWHL, targeting Toronto, Montreal, and potentially Calgary. On April 2, 2019, the NWHL announced plans for two expansion franchises in Montreal and Toronto and increased support from the NHL, making it one of the NWHL's biggest financial sponsors. However, in the wake of the CWHL's collapse, it became clear that players from both leagues were dissatisfied in the operation of both leagues and a lack of livable salaries, health insurance, and other benefits. On May 2, over 200 players released a joint statement announcing their intent to boycott all North American professional hockey for the 2019–20 season.

The NWHL responded that it was pursuing more sponsors than in previous years, hoped to increase player salaries, and agreed to give players a 50% split of revenue on league sponsorship and media deals. On May 20, 2019, boycotting players formed the Professional Women's Hockey Players Association (PWHPA) to organize toward a unified league providing financial and infrastructure resources to players, health insurance, and support to training programs for young female players.

On May 8, 2019, Pegula Sports and Entertainment relinquished ownership and operations of the Beauts back to the NWHL. On May 17, it was reported that the New Jersey Devils were ending their partnership with the Riveters. With these partnerships dissolved, both teams changed their home venues.

On May 30, 2019, the NWHL announced that due to no additional investments, the league would not be able to increase to full-time salaries or provide players with health insurance outside of the typical worker's compensation for injuries, but it had come to an agreement to a 50% revenue split on all league-wide sponsorship and media deals. In addition, the league stated it would not add teams in Montreal or Toronto for the 2019–20 season. The league announced a longer 2019–20 season, increasing from 16 to 24 games. The NWHL Players Association called the negotiated agreement a "breakthrough" that represented the first "substantial gains" players had made since the formation of the league.

In September 2019, the Boston Pride were purchased by a group of investors led by Miles Arnone. On April 22, 2020, the NWHL announced the awaited expansion team for Toronto, bringing the league to Canada for the first time. The Toronto Six began play in the 2020–21 season. Johanna Neilson Boynton was announced as the team owner, Tyler Tumminia as the team chairman, and Digit Murphy as team president.

On October 12, 2020, Rylan stepped down as commissioner and was replaced by Tyler Tumminia as interim commissioner. Also, the league changed its governing model to an incorporated association overseen by a board of governors with one representative from each team. Rylan remained with the league to oversee the Beauts, Whale, Riveters, and Whitecaps, while searching for independent ownership of the league operated teams. Rylan left that role in March 2021.

=== Premier Hockey Federation (2021–2023) ===
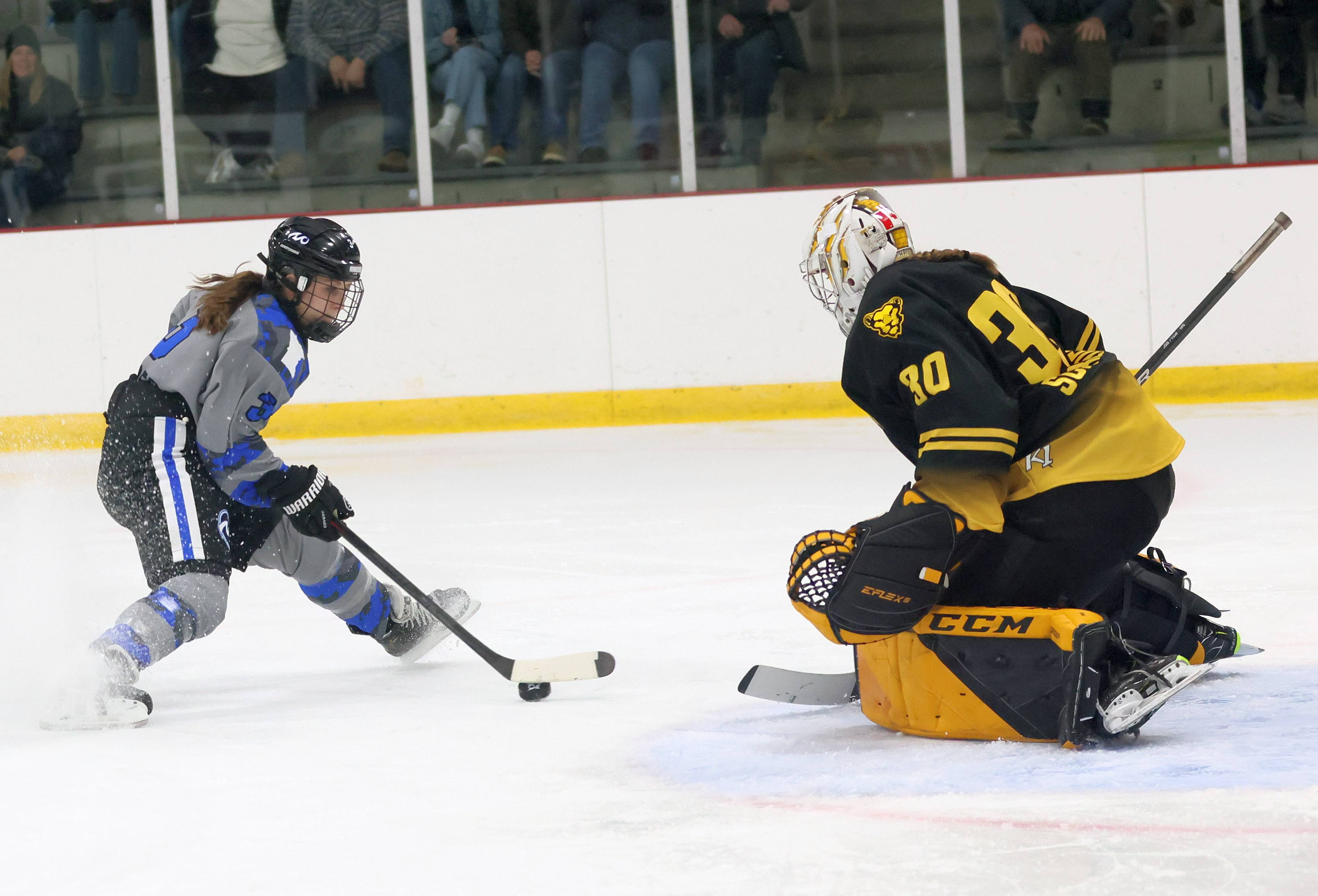
Jonna Albers of the Whitecaps on a breakaway against Corinne Schroeder of the Pride.

Ahead of the 2021–22 season, Tumminia announced that the player salary cap would be doubled to $300,000. On May 10, 2021, the league announced it had sold the Connecticut Whale to a new independent ownership group called Shared Hockey Enterprises (SHE), LLC, led by Tobin Kelly, reducing the number of league-operated teams to three. On May 26, the league announced that the Riveters had been sold to BTM Partners, owners of the Boston Pride and Toronto Six, with John Boynton named as the team's chairman. The NWHL finished selling its league-operated teams to independent ownership with the sale of the Buffalo Beauts and Minnesota Whitecaps to a joint partnership of NLTT Ventures, LLC, and Top Tier Sports on June 28.

In September 2021, the league officially rebranded as the Premier Hockey Federation (PHF), reflecting its many structural changes and deliberately adopting a gender-neutral name. The 2021–22 season, the league's first season under the PHF title, began in November 2021. PHF players were required to follow testing and quarantine protocols due to the outbreak of the COVID-19 Omicron variant.

On January 18, 2022, the league announced that that 2022–23 salary cap would increase to $750,000, and players would receive full healthcare benefits and an equity stake in its teams. Also, the league announced an expansion team for Montreal, and opened the possibility of additional expansion in the U.S. On July 12, the league officially introduced the Montreal team, the Force, owned by BTM Partners. Kevin Raphael would serve as the team's president.

In February 2022, the league announced that Tumminia would step down as commissioner at the end of the 2021–22 season. In April, Tumminia was succeeded by Reagan Carey, the former director of USA Hockey's women's program.

In December 2022, the salary cap for the 2023–24 PHF season was set at $1.5 million. The increase aligned with the Board of Governors' pledge, made in 2021, to invest $25 million directly into pay and benefits for PHF players over the ensuing three seasons. The announced cap signified a 900% growth over the 2021 salary cap.

=== Buyout and launch of PWHL (2023) ===
On June 29, 2023, the Premier Hockey Federation announced that the league had been sold to Mark Walter Group and BJK Enterprises, respectively led by Los Angeles Dodgers owner Mark Walter and American tennis legend Billie Jean King, who had been working with the PWHPA since 2022 with the intention of launching a new, unified women's professional league. The buyout voided all PHF player contracts, with players receiving severance payments; they would be required to renegotiate their contracts with the new league. PHF players would also not be parties to negotiations toward a collective bargaining agreement (CBA) between the PWHPA's new labor union, the PWHL Players Association, and the new league before its ratification. Players who reviewed the new CBA reported that it included minimum salaries of $35,000, medical benefits, compensation for housing and relocation, retirement benefits, parental and maternity leave, and other incentives.

The new league was expected to have six 23-player teams, one fewer than the PHF and five fewer than the PHF and PWHPA combined, meaning many players from both organizations would not be drafted or signed during the new league's free-agency period. Players not playing in a professional league for the 2023–24 season would be eligible for an additional compensatory payment of at least $10,000.

On August 29, 2023, the new league was announced as the Professional Women's Hockey League (PWHL) with six teams: Boston, Minnesota, Montreal, New York, Ottawa, and Toronto. The new league began play in January 2024.

== Teams ==
Map of Premier Hockey Federation teams in its final season (2022–23)

Team	City	Primary arena	Head coach	Cups	Joined	Partner teams
Boston Pride	Boston, Massachusetts	Warrior Ice Arena	Paul Mara	3	2015	Boston Bruins (NHL)
Buffalo Beauts	Amherst, New York	Northtown Center	vacant	1	2015	Buffalo Sabres (NHL)
Connecticut Whale	Simsbury, Connecticut	International Skating Center of Connecticut	Colton Orr	0	2015	
Metropolitan Riveters	East Rutherford, New Jersey	The Rink at American Dream	Venla Hovi	1	2015	New Jersey Devils (NHL)
Minnesota Whitecaps	Richfield, Minnesota	Richfield Ice Arena	vacant	1	2018	Minnesota Wild (NHL)
Montreal Force	Montreal, Quebec	Various (Note: The team played its first two home games of the 2022–23 season at Centre 21.02, which doubled as its practice facility; the Force played its remaining home games at five different venues throughout the province of Quebec.)	Peter Smith	0	2022	
Toronto Six	Toronto, Ontario	Canlan Ice Sports – York	Geraldine Heaney	1	2020	

== Seasons ==
=== 2015–16 ===
The inaugural NWHL Draft took place in Boston on June 20, 2015, with each team selecting five collegiate players. The draft order was decided by lottery: the New York Riveters to pick first, followed by the Connecticut Whale, the Boston Pride, and the Buffalo Beauts. The first overall pick was Boston College graduate Alex Carpenter, the 2015 winner of the Patty Kazmaier Award, and the daughter of NHL All-Star Bobby Carpenter.

The first game in league history occurred on October 11, 2015, a sold-out match between the Riveters and the Whale. Manon Rhéaume dropped the puck in the ceremonial face-off before the second game in NWHL history later that night in Buffalo. The first goal in league history was scored by Jessica Koizumi of the Whale; Connecticut went on to a 4–1 win. The Boston Pride secured the first Isobel Cup championship on March 12, 2016, defeating the Buffalo Beauts in a 2–0 series win.

=== 2016–17 ===
All four teams returned for the second season. Prior to the first game of the season, the Beauts' Harrison Browne announced that he was a transgender athlete. The 2nd NWHL All-Star Game was held in Pittsburgh, Pennsylvania, a rumored expansion market. Amanda Kessel and Kelley Steadman were name All-Star captains. Kessel scored the first hat trick in NWHL All-Star history and was named Star of the Night by ESPN's SportsCenter. Brianna Decker finished the season as the league's top scorer and was named NWHL Most Valuable Player (MVP). The Beauts, who finished in third place in the shortened season, upset the league-leading Pride to win the Isobel Cup. The Beauts were honored at a Buffalo Sabres game later that month.

=== 2017–18 ===
All four teams returned for the third season, all with a primary home arena for the first time. Buffalo played their home opener at Bill Gray's Regional Iceplex in the suburbs of Rochester. There was also one neutral-site game in Pittsburgh. The Metropolitan Riveters won the Isobel Cup, defeating the Buffalo Beauts.

=== 2018–19 ===
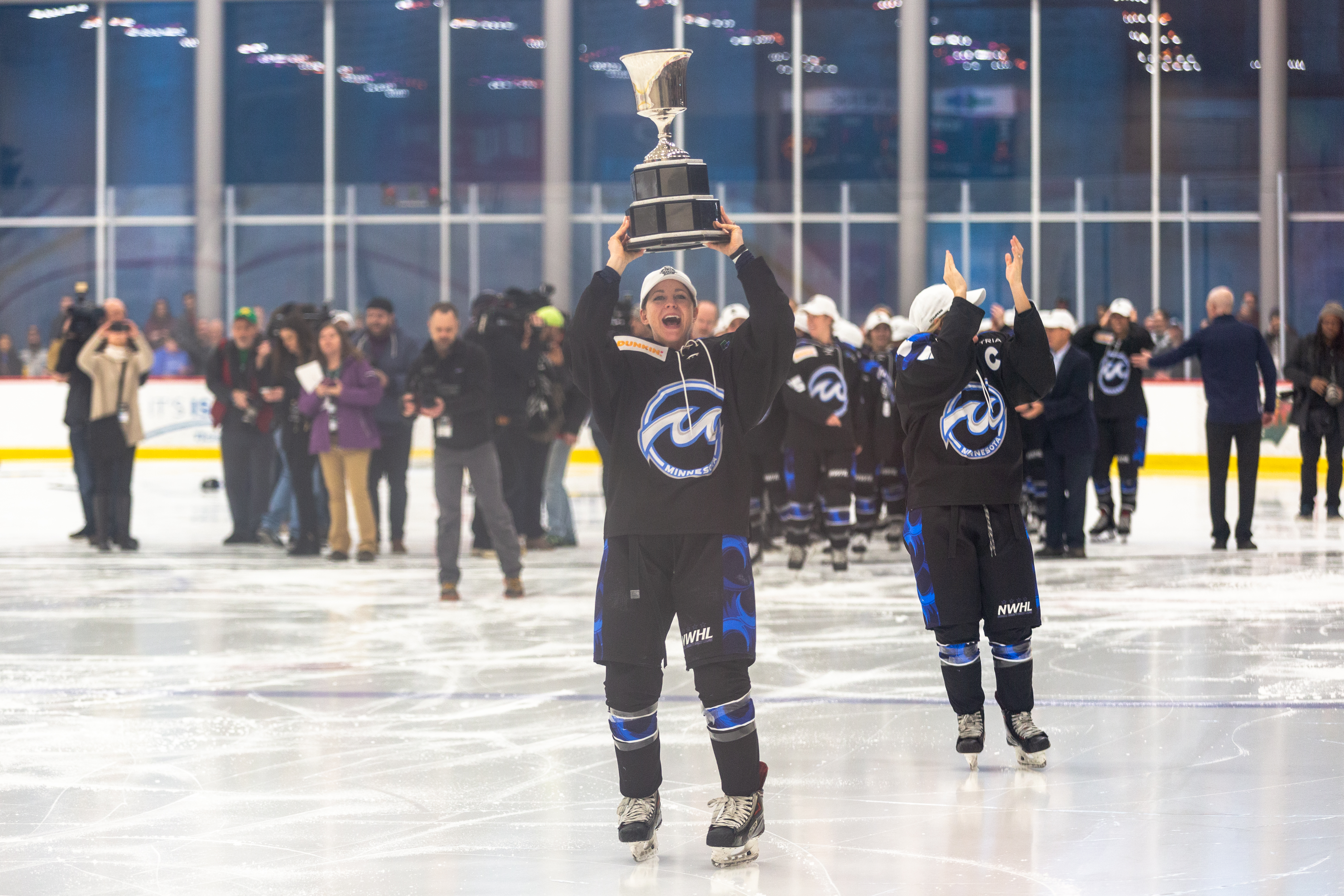
Chelsey Brodt Rosenthal of the Whitecaps lifts the Isobel Cup in 2019.

The league expanded to five teams with the inclusion of the formerly independent Minnesota Whitecaps. The Champions Cup was played between the NWHL's 2018 Isobel Cup champion Metropolitan Riveters and the Swedish Women's Hockey League (SDHL) 2018 champion Luleå HF at Hobey Baker Memorial Rink in Princeton, New Jersey; Luleå defeated the Riveters 4–2. The Whitecaps won the Isobel Cup over the Beauts in their first season in the league.

=== 2019–20 ===
All five teams returned. Many former players boycotted the NWHL and formed the Professional Women's Hockey Players Association (PWHPA), leading to large roster turnover in the offseason. The season was expanded from 16 to 24 games. On January 26, 2020, Jillian Dempsey became the first player in league history to reach 100 career points, including playoffs. She reached the century mark with an assist in a win versus Minnesota. Prior to the championship game between the Boston Pride and Minnesota Whitecaps, the closure of public events during the COVID-19 pandemic led to the postponement and eventual cancellation of the championship—the 2020 Isobel Cup was thus not awarded.

=== 2020–21 ===
The five teams from the previous season returned, and the expansion Toronto Six were added. Due to the ongoing COVID-19 pandemic, the start of the regular season was pushed to November 2020 and expected to last until mid-March 2021 with 60 regular-season games before the Isobel Cup playoffs. The start date was postponed again to January 2021, with each team playing five games, one against each team, before starting the Isobel Cup playoffs. All games were held at Herb Brooks Arena in Lake Placid, New York.

During the two-week season, the Riveters had to withdraw from participation after several members of the organization tested positive for COVID-19. Several days later, the Whale forfeited their final game and withdrew before the playoffs. The league suspended play one day before the playoffs were to begin. The league rescheduled the Isobel Cup playoffs for March 26 and 27 in Brighton, Massachusetts. On March 27, Boston won its second Isobel Cup title.

=== 2021–22 ===
On April 28, 2021, the league announced it was planning to double the salary cap of every franchise to $300,000, based on projections of financial stability for the seventh season. The Pride won their second consecutive and third overall Isobel Cup.

=== 2022–23 ===
The 2022–23 season saw the debut of a seventh franchise, the Montreal Force. The Toronto Six defeated the Minnesota Whitecaps 4–3 in overtime to become the first Canadian team to win the Isobel Cup championship.

== Isobel Cup championship ==
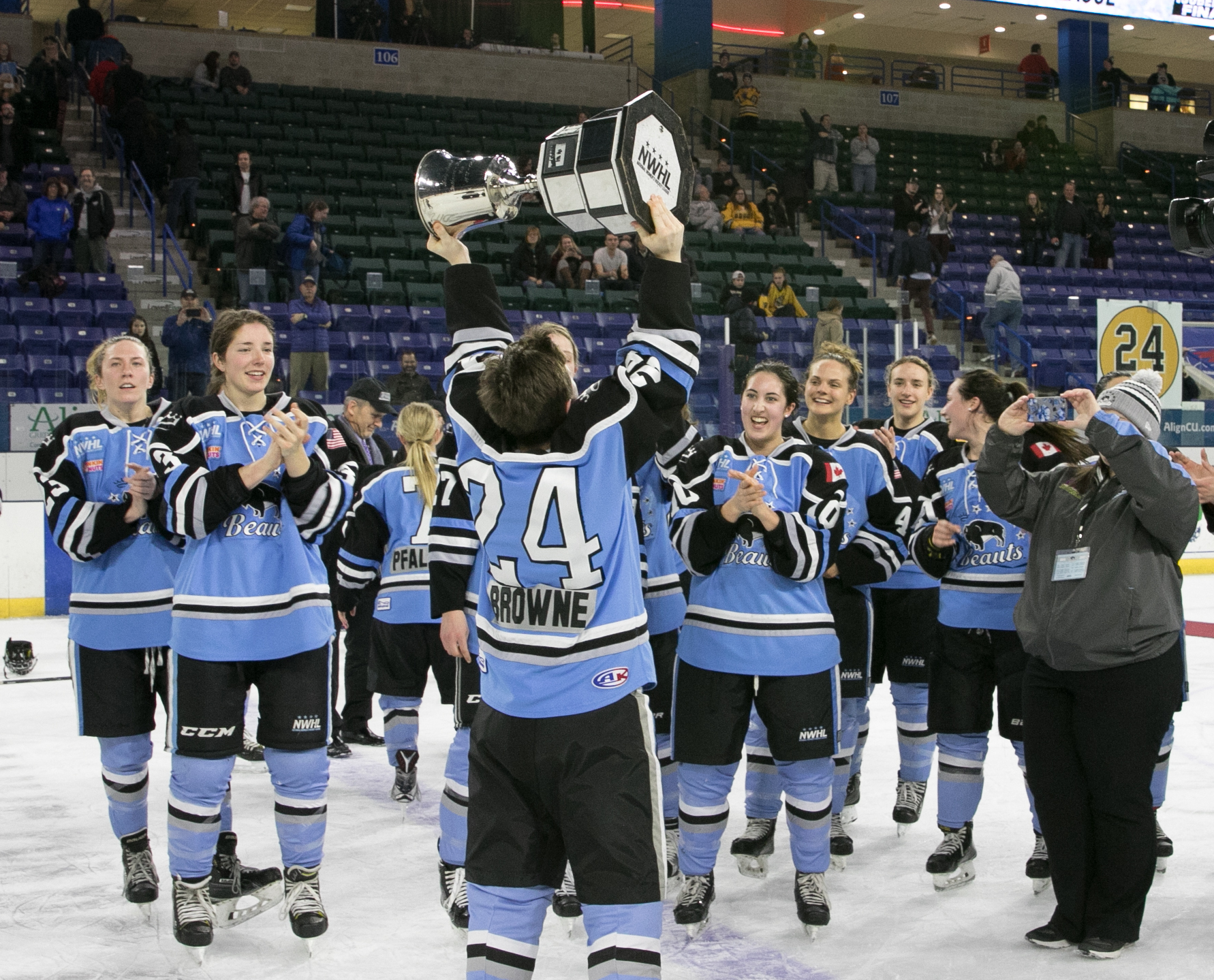
Harrison Browne of the Buffalo Beauts lifts the Isobel Cup in 2017.

The Isobel Cup, the league's championship trophy, was awarded annually to the league playoff champion at the end of each season. The trophy was named after Lady Isobel Gathorne-Hardy, the daughter of Frederick Stanley, 16th Earl of Derby and the namesake of the Stanley Cup. The front of the trophy is engraved:

"The Lady Isobel Gathorne-Hardy Cup 1875–1963. This Cup, shall be awarded annually to the greatest professional women's hockey team in North America. All who pursue this Cup, pursue a dream; a dream born with Isobel, that shall never die. EST. 2016."

The Boston Pride won the inaugural championship in 2016. The Buffalo Beauts earned the most appearances in the Isobel Cup championship, with four straight appearances from 2016 to 2019, winning once in 2017.

The 2020 Isobel Cup championship between the Boston Pride and Minnesota Whitecaps was originally postponed due to the COVID-19 pandemic, and was later canceled outright. The league announced that no champion would be named for the season.

Boston was the only team to win the Isobel Cup in consecutive seasons, achieving the feat in 2020–21 and 2021–22. The Toronto Six were the final Isobel Cup champions with the league ceasing operations following the 2022–23 PHF season.

== Broadcasting ==
During the inaugural season, some games were shown on ESPN3. The Boston Pride became the first women's hockey team to enter a regular broadcasting agreement with a regional sports network, with 8 of its 18 games presented on either New England Sports Network (NESN) or NESN+ during the league's inaugural season. In 2016, third-party broadcasts moved from ESPN3 to Cheddar. On March 16, 2017, the league announced that ABC News' website would provide live streaming coverage of the 2017 Isobel Cup Playoffs.

On June 20, 2017, it was announced that the NWHL had made a deal with Twitter to live stream 16 regular-season games, one game a week billed as the "Twitter NWHL Game of the Week", plus the All Star Game and the NWHL/Team Russia Summit Series for the 2017–18 season. As part of the partnership with the New Jersey Devils in October 2017, some Riveters games were broadcast on The One Jersey Network, the Devils' digital radio station. The league also streamed and archived some games on its YouTube channel for free through a service dubbed The Cross-Ice Pass.

On September 5, 2019, the NWHL announced a three-year deal with Twitch streaming service to stream all games and league events on the platform. It marked the first NWHL broadcast deal to include a rights fee, with revenue to be shared with players. The NWHL also reached an agreement with NBCSN to carry the 2021 Isobel Cup semifinals and final, which would mark the first NWHL games to be broadcast nationally on a linear television channel.

In 2020 and 2021, the NWHL was criticized for producing content in association with Barstool Sports, a media organization that had previously been accused of promoting racist and misogynistic views. In response, the NWHL distanced itself from the outlet, after Barstool's CEO Erika Nardini posted a video allegedly encouraging the harassment of journalists who criticized the partnership.

In October 2021, the PHF announced it would exclusively stream its seventh season on ESPN+ in the U.S., with the 2022 Isobel Cup final airing on ESPN2.

== See also ==
- PHF awards
- List of PHF records (individual)
- List of professional sports teams in the United States and Canada
- Major women's sport leagues in North America
- List of ice hockey leagues
- Women's sports
