= 2011–12 WCHA women's ice hockey season =

2011–12 Western Collegiate Hockey Association women's ice hockey season
- League: NCAA Division I
- Sport: Ice hockey
- Duration: September 2011 - March, 2012
- Teams: 8

Regular season
- Reg. season champs: Wisconsin Badgers
- Tournament: Minnesota Golden Gophers
- Top scorer: Jocelyne Lamoureux

Ice hockey seasons
- 10–11 12–13

The 2011–12 WCHA women's ice hockey season marked the continuation of the annual tradition of competitive ice hockey among Western Collegiate Hockey Association members.

== Exhibition ==
Date	NCAA school	CIS school	Score	NCAA goal scorers
Sept. 23	North Dakota	Manitoba	ND, 11-0	Sara Dagenais, Mary Loken, Alyssa Wiebe (2), Monique Weber, Jocelyne Lamoureux (2), Andrea Dalen, Allison Parizek, Monique Weber, Ashley Holmes
Sept. 23	Ohio State	Wilfrid Laurier	Ohio State, 3-1	Kayla Sullivan, Danielle Gagne, Melissa Feste
Sept. 24	North Dakota	Manitoba	ND, 10-0	Alyssa Wiebe, Jocelyne Lamoureux (2), Josefine Jacobsen (3), Monique Lamoureux, Monique Weber, Andrea Dalen, Michelle Karvinen

- September 24: Freshman Josefine Jakobsen recorded a hat-trick as the Fighting Sioux defeated the Manitoba Bisons women's ice hockey program by a 10-0 tally. Of note, the European freshmen that combined for 11 points in the game. Michelle Karvinen had four points, while Andrea Dalen had three points.

== Regular season ==
=== News and notes ===
==== September ====
- September 24: Karley Sylvester was the first Wisconsin Badgers freshman of the campaign to net a goal.
- On September 25, 2011, Hilary Knight scored her fifth career hat trick in a 13–0 defeat of the Lindenwood Lions. In addition, Briana Decker scored her third career hat trick. The 13 goals scored by the Badgers were tied for third most in the NCAA women's ice hockey all-time list for most goals scored in a game by a team.

==== October ====
- October 14: Laura McIntosh notched her first goal of the season to give the Ohio State Buckeyes a 2–1 lead. Said goal would stand as the game-winner. In addition, she picked up an assist on a Hokey Langan goal. The assist made McIntosh Ohio State's all-time leader in career points against WCHA opponents. She surpassed Jana Harrigan's 110 league points set in 2006.
- October 15–16: Michelle Karvinen produced five points, and earned a +5 plus/minus rating as the Fighting Sioux swept the Vermont Catamounts. In a 9–1 win on October 15, 2011, Karvinen scored two goals and set up another for a three-point performance. She assisted on Jocelyne Lamoureux's game-winning goal at 2:58 of the first period. The following day, she accumulated two more assists in a 4–1 win. For the second consecutive game, she assisted on the game-winning goal, as Monique Lamoureux scored at 15:11 of the second period.
- October 21: In its WCHA home opener, the top line of the Fighting Sioux combined for thirteen points as they bested the Ohio State Buckeyes by an 11–1 margin. Monique Lamoureux-Kolls tied a North Dakota record with a 5-point game. In the contest, 13 different Sioux skaters registered at least one point. Michelle Karvinen scored a hat trick and logged one assist for four points. In addition, Josefine Jakobsen and Jocelyne Lamoureux each had 4-point games. Several program records were broken in the game including: most goals scored in a game (11), largest margin of victory (10), and largest margin of victory over a conference opponent (10).

==== November ====
- Nov. 18-19: Carolyne Prevost became the 17th player in program history to record 100 career points. In a victory over RPI, she netted the first goal of the game for Wisconsin. She would also record an assist in the match. The following day, Prevost recorded six points in the finale against RPI. It was a team-high for any Wisconsin skater this season. She scored two goals, including the game winner, and helped on four other goals to establish a new career high for most points in one game.
- November 18: Minnesota skater Amanda Kessel registered 5 points (including four goals)as the Golden Gophers defeated the New Hampshire Wildcats by an 11-0 tally. New Hampshire starting goalie Jenn Gilligan made 27 saves but allowed eight goals in two periods. She was replaced by Moe Bradley in the third period. Bradley stopped 11 of 14 shots as the Wildcats suffered their worst loss in the 35-year history of the program.
- November 19: Amanda Kessel earned her second hat trick of the series as the Gophers defeated New Hampshire by a 6-1 tally. Senior Jen Schoullis factored on every goal, as she tied the Gophers record for assists in a game with five. With three points in the first period, Schoullis also set a career record for points in a period.
- November 25: In Wisconsin's fifth shutout of the season, Brianna Decker and Hilary Knight netted two goals apiece in a 5–0 victory over St. Cloud State. Brianna Decker extended her point scoring streak to 26 games, a program record, while Alex Rigsby earned her 10th career shutout.
- November 25: Natalie Spooner scored four goals for the third time in her NCAA career, including a natural hat trick as the Buckeyes enjoyed a home-ice conference victory over Minnesota Duluth. She scored all four goals as the final score was 4–1 in the Buckeyes favor. It was the second time in the 2011-12 campaign that she scored four goals in a game. The natural hat trick (three consecutive goals) was scored in the second period as the Buckeyes faced a 1–0 deficit against the Bulldogs. The eventual game-winner was scored at 10:56 of the second period. The hat trick was the fifth of her collegiate career. The four goal performance moved Spooner to fourth overall on the Buckeye career points list with 129. Spooner is now four goals away from tying Jeni Creary's Ohio State record of 86 career goals.
- November 25–26: Erika Wheelhouse logged four points in a two-game conference series split with nationally ranked North Dakota. She scored one goal and notched an assist on November 25. The game was called The Wheelhouse Homecoming as it was being played in her hometown of Crookston, Minnesota. She assisted on her sister Marlee's second period power-play goal to give the Beavers a 1–0 lead. Later in the game, she would score to tie the game at 2 apiece. Despite eventually losing by a 5–2 mark, the two power play goals for the Beavers were their 22nd and 23rd this season, which leads the NCAA. The November 26 match was contested at the Sanford Center in Bemidji and Wheelhouse assisted on two first period goals. The Beavers would hold on for a 3–2 victory. With the four point performance in the series, Wheelhouse is tied for the scoring lead among WCHA defenders with 19 points.

==== December ====
- December 10: In a WCHA contest versus Bemidji State, Hilary Knight produced four points, giving her a career total of 239. She has now surpassed Meghan Duggan's 238 career points, to become the Wisconsin Badgers all-time leading point scorer. For her efforts, Knight was recognized as the WCHA Player of the Week.*

==== January ====
- January 27: Three Buckeyes reached milestones in a 6–2 upset of North Dakota. Laura McIntosh finished the game with three assists. Natalie Spooner totaled two goals and Hokey Langan finished with two assists. McIntosh's three helpers moved her into a tie for the all-time lead on Ohio State's all-time career points list. Her 160 career points are now tied with former Buckeye Jana Harrigan. The two goals by Spooner were both on the power-play (increasing her season total to seven). With the goals, Spooner reached the 150 career point plateau, moving her into third all-time in Ohio State history. The two assists from Langan helped her reach the 100-point milestone, only the eighth Buckeyes player to reach the mark.
- January 27–28: Wisconsin posted a two-game sweep of Bemidji State. In the first game, Madison Packer scored the game-winning goal in overtime as the Badgers prevailed by a 3–2 score. The following day, Hilary Knight notched her first goal since Dec. 10 with 7:38 left in the third period. Said goal would stand as the game winner on Fill the Bowl nights. A record crowd of 12,402 attended the Kohl Center. Alex Rigby made 28 saves to obtain her sixth shutout of the campaign. Her rival between the pipes, Bemidji State netminder Zuzana Tomcikova made 32 saves. Wisconsin is the only team to sweep the season series from the Beavers during the 2011–12 season. The previous record for most fans to watch a women's college hockey game at the Kohl Center was 10,668. That record was set at the Kohl Center on Jan. 29, 2011.

==== February ====
- February 18: In a 7–1 victory over MSU-Mankato, Haley Irwin netted the 200th point of her NCAA career. She became the sixth-ever Bulldog to score 200 career points as she registered a power play goal in the first period.

=== Standings ===
2011–12 Western Collegiate Hockey Association standings
	Conference								Overall					
	GP	W	L	T	SW	PTS	GF	GA	GP	W	L	T	GF	GA
#1 Wisconsin†	28	23	3	2	1	72	113	44	37	31	4	2	170	53
#2 Minnesota*	28	21	5	2	1	66	113	43	37	30	5	2	167	50
#6 North Dakota	28	16	9	3	2	53	116	75	36	22	11	3	154	89
#9 Minnesota Duluth	28	15	12	1	1	47	91	61	36	21	13	1	121	77
Ohio State	28	13	14	1	1	41	75	96	36	16	16	4	99	115
Bemidji State	28	11	15	2	0	35	70	73	37	17	17	3	101	85
St. Cloud State	28	4	24	0	0	12	32	150	36	5	29	2	37	130
Minnesota State	28	3	24	1	0	10	37	105	36	7	28	1	64	133
Championship: Minnesota † indicates conference regular season champion * indicates conference tournament champion National rankings: Conference rankings: Updated March 23, 2012

=== In-season honors ===
==== Players of the week ====
Week	Player of the week
October 4	Kathleen Rogan, MSU
October 11	Natalie Spooner, Ohio State; Amanda Kessel, Minnesota
October 18	Laura MacIntosh, Ohio State
October 25	Monique Lamoureux, North Dakota
November 1	Katherine Wilson, Minnesota-Duluth
November 8	Jocelyne Lamoureux, North Dakota
November 15	Not awarded
November 22	Amanda Kessel (Minnesota); Carolyne Prevost, Wisconsin
November 29	Natalie Spooner, Ohio State
December 6	Haley Irwin, Minnesota-Duluth
December 13	Hilary Knight, Wisconsin
January 16	Carolyne Prevost, Wisconsin
January 23	Jocelyne Lamoureux, North Dakota
January 30	Emily West, Minnesota
February 6	Amanda Kessel, Minnesota
February 13	Hilary Knight, Wisconsin
February 20	Brooke Ammerman, Wisconsin; Haley Irwin, Minnesota-Duluth
February 27	

==== Defensive players of the week ====
Week	Player of the week
October 4	Zuzana Tomcikova, Bemidji State
October 11	Erika Wheelhouse, Bemidji State
October 18	Alex Rigbsy, Wisconsin
October 25	Alex Rigsby, Wisconsin
November 1	Lisa Steffes, Ohio State
November 8	Noora Raty, Minnesota
November 15	Not awarded
November 22	Candice Molle, North Dakota
November 29	Erika Wheelhouse, Bemidji State
December 6	Megan Bozek, Minnesota
December 13	Alli Altmann, Minnesota State
January 16	Julie Friend, St. Cloud State
January 23	Jorid Dagfinrud, North Dakota
January 30	Alex Rigsby, Wisconsin
February 6	Monique Lamoureux-Kolls, North Dakota
February 13	Anne Schleper, Minnesota; Zuzana Tomcikova, Bemidji State
February 20	Montana Vichorek, Bemidji State
February 27	

==== Rookies of the week ====
Week	Player of the week
October 4	Blayre Turnbull, Wisconsin
October 11	Meghan Lorence, Minnesota
October 18	Michelle Karvinen, North Dakota
October 25	Michelle Karvinen, North Dakota
November 1	Rachael Kelly, Bemidji State
November 8	Michelle Karvinen, North Dakota
November 15	Not awarded
November 22	Taylor Kuehl, Ohio State
November 29	Katy Josephs, Wisconsin
December 6	Jenna McParland, Minnesota-Duluth
December 13	Julie Friend, St. Cloud State
January 16	Jenna McParland, Minnesota-Duluth
January 23	Rachael Bona, Minnesota
January 30	Josefine Jakobsen, North Dakota
February 6	Michelle Karvinen, North Dakota
February 13	Rachel Ramsey, Minnesota
February 20	Josefine Jakobsen, North Dakota
February 27	

== Awards and honors ==
- Brianna Decker, 2012 Patty Kazmaier Memorial Award

=== All-America honors ===
- Megan Bozek, 2011-12 CCM Hockey Women's Division I All-American: First Team
- Brianna Decker, 2011-12 CCM Hockey Women's Division I All-American: First Team
- Jocelyne Lamoureux, 2011-12 CCM Hockey Women's Division I All-American: First Team
- Zuzana Tomcikova, 2011-12 CCM Hockey Women's Division I All-American: Second Team
- Monique Lamoureux, 2011-12 CCM Hockey Women's Division I All-American: Second Team
- Amanda Kessel, 2011-12 CCM Hockey Women's Division I All-American: Second Team
- Hilary Knight, 2011-12 CCM Hockey Women's Division I All-American: Second Team
- Natalie Spooner, 2011-12 CCM Hockey Women's Division I All-American: Second Team

== See also ==
- National Collegiate Women's Ice Hockey Championship
