= Natalie Spooner =

Canadian ice hockey player (born 1990)

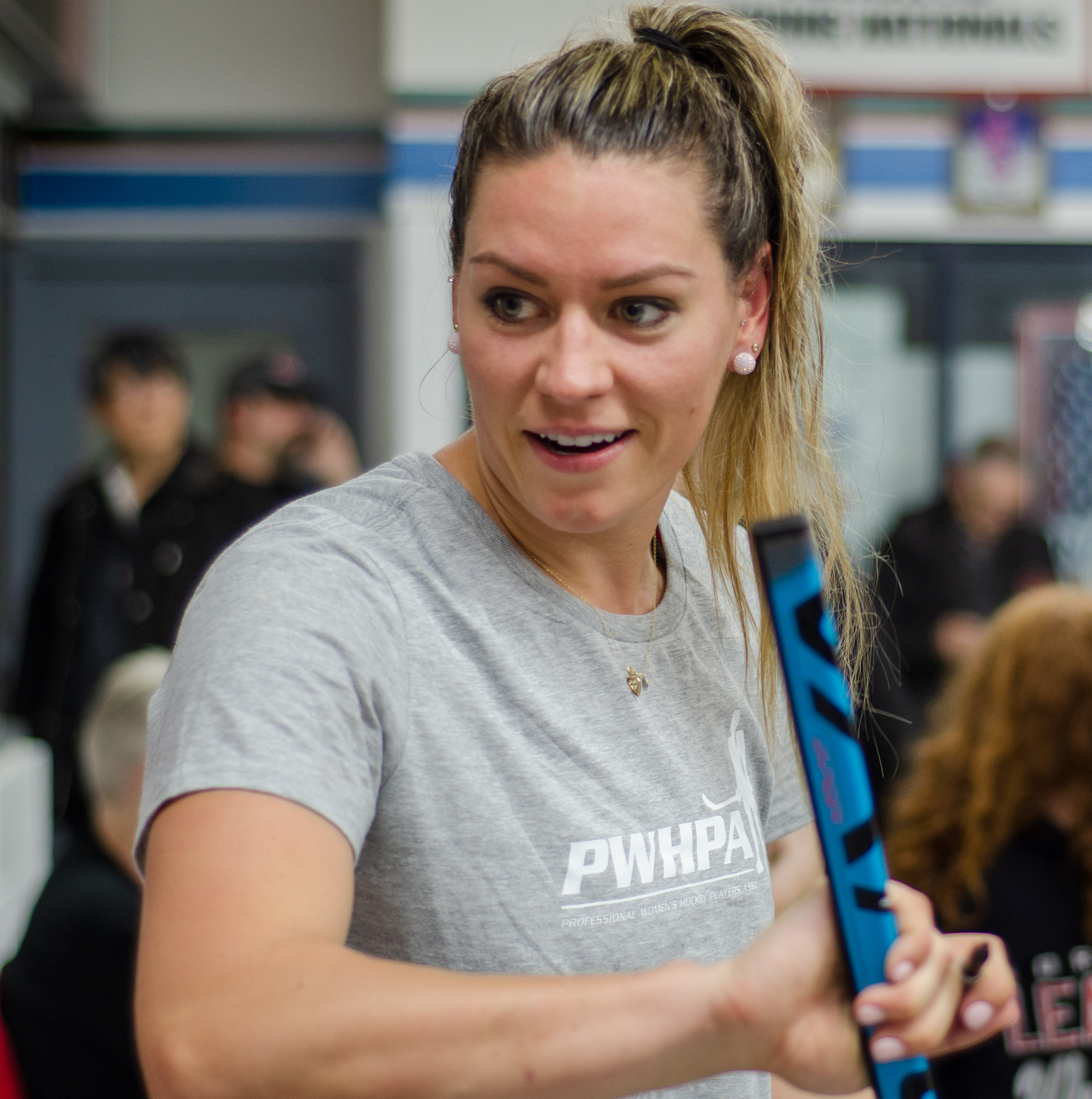
- Spooner in 2019
- Born: October 17, 1990 (age 36) Scarborough, Ontario, Canada
- Height: 5 ft 10 in (178 cm)
- Weight: 181 lb (82 kg; 12 st 13 lb)
- Position: Forward
- Shoots: Right
- PWHL team Former teams: Toronto Sceptres: Mississauga Chiefs; Toronto Furies
- National team: Canada
- Playing career: 2007–present
Medal record
Women's ice hockey
Representing Canada
Olympic Games
Gold medal – first place	2014 Sochi	Team
Gold medal – first place	2022 Beijing	Team
Silver medal – second place	2018 Pyeongchang	Team
Silver medal – second place	2026 Milano Cortina	Team
World Championships
Gold medal – first place	2012 United States
Gold medal – first place	2021 Canada
Gold medal – first place	2024 United States
Silver medal – second place	2011 Switzerland
Silver medal – second place	2013 Canada
Silver medal – second place	2015 Sweden
Silver medal – second place	2016 Canada
Silver medal – second place	2017 United States
Silver medal – second place	2023 Canada
Silver medal – second place	2025 Czechia
Bronze medal – third place	2019 Finland
World U18 Championships
Silver medal – second place	2008 Canada

Natalie Marie Spooner (born October 17, 1990) is a Canadian professional ice hockey player for the Toronto Sceptres of the Professional Women's Hockey League (PWHL) and a member of the Canadian national women's team. She was named the IIHF Female Player of the Year in 2024.

With the Canadian national team, Spooner is a four-time Olympic medalist, winning gold at the 2014 and 2022 Olympics, and silver at the 2018 and 2026 Olympics. She has won 11 medals at the IIHF Women's World Championship (three gold, seven silver, one bronze) since making her debut in 2011. In 2014, she became the first player to win both an Olympic gold medal and the Clarkson Cup in the same year.

In the PWHL's inaugural season, Spooner led the league in both goals and points, and was awarded the Billie Jean King MVP Award, PWHL Forward of the Year, and named to the PWHL First Team All-Star. During her collegiate career at Ohio State, she set school records with 100 career goals and was a finalist for the Patty Kazmaier Award. She runs a High Performance Hockey Academy for girls.

== Early life ==
Spooner grew up in the Scarborough neighbourhood of Toronto, Ontario, after her parents Peter and Ann-Marie emigrated from England to Canada in the 1970s. The youngest of four children, she followed her three older brothers into hockey, spending winters helping build and skating on a backyard rink behind the family home. Spooner began playing organized hockey at age four, starting with a boys’ team before joining the Durham West Lightning Girls Hockey Association, where she played for more than a decade. A multi-sport and multi-activity student, she also took part in sports such as soccer and swimming and participated in school band and French immersion, which later helped her adapt to the bilingual environment of Team Canada dressing rooms. As a teenager, she attended Cedarbrae Collegiate Institute, where she was named athlete of the year in each of her four years and became known as a prolific goal-scorer with the Durham West junior program.

While she attended Cedarbrae Collegiate Institute, Spooner played with the Durham West Jr. Lightning. At Cedarbrae, she was named the school's athlete of the year for four consecutive years. She captained the team to a fourth-place finish in the Provincial Women's Hockey League in 2008. During the 2007–08 season, Spooner led the Lightning in goals with 25 and was third on the team in scoring with 38 points in 23 games. Her point total ranked 11th in the league. During the 2006–07 PWHL season, Spooner was the leading goal-scorer with 32 goals and served as an assistant captain. She was a member of Team Ontario Red with future Buckeye teammate Laura McIntosh. Spooner served as captain of the squad, leading it to the gold medal in the U-18 National Hockey Tournament after recovering from a broken jaw sustained in a PWHL game. She broke her jaw in two places, had her mouth wired shut for five weeks and was limited to a liquid diet. Spooner competed in the 2008 Esso Women's Nationals with the Mississauga Chiefs. Before committing to Ohio State for food science nutrition, approximately 30 universities and colleges expressed interest in her.

== Playing career ==
=== Ohio State Buckeyes (2009-12) ===
Spooner played college ice hockey for the Ohio State Buckeyes from 2009 to 2012. As a freshman, Spooner played in 30 games (she missed six games due to her commitments with Team Canada). Despite playing in only 30 games, Spooner scored 21 goals to lead the Buckeyes. She added nine assists for 30 points, which ranked third on the Buckeyes. Spooner set a Buckeye record by winning four WCHA Rookie of the Week awards. She has been one of the top goal-scorers in the WCHA during the 08-09 and 09-10 two seasons. Her 43 career goals rank sixth among the Buckeyes. Her 74 career points are 14th after 65 games played. Spooner was a First Team All-WCHA honoree during the 2009–10 season. On January 28–29, 2011, Spooner scored four goals and contributed six points as the Buckeyes swept conference rival St. Cloud State on the road. In Ohio State's 6–1 victory on January 28, Spooner recorded her third-career hat trick as well as an assist. Her goal at 9:58 of the second period came shorthanded and proved to be the game-winner. Spooner had two points in the second game as the Buckeyes prevailed by a 3–2 mark. Spooner leads the Buckeyes with 14 multi-point games this season and owns a team-high 24 goals. Spooner holds the Buckeye record for career game-winning goals with 12. In the Buckeyes final regular season game of the 2010–11 season, Spooner scored a goal (her 25th of the season) in a 5–1 loss to Minnesota-Duluth to tie Jana Harrigan for second on the all-time Ohio State career list with 68 goals

In the first conference game of the 2011–12 Ohio State Buckeyes women's ice hockey season against Bemidji State, Spooner had four goals in regulation, along with the only goal in the shootout to lead the Buckeyes to victory. On November 25, 2011, Spooner scored four goals for the third time in her NCAA career, including a natural hat trick as the Buckeyes enjoyed a home-ice conference victory over Minnesota Duluth. She scored all four goals as the final score was 4–1 in the Buckeyes favour. It was the second time in the 2011–12 campaign that she scored four goals in a game. The natural hat trick (three consecutive goals) was scored in the second period as the Buckeyes faced a 1–0 deficit against the Bulldogs. The eventual game-winner was scored at 10:56 of the second period. The hat trick was the fifth of her collegiate career. The four-goal performance moved Spooner to fourth overall on the Buckeye career points list with 129. Spooner is now four goals away from tying Jeni Creary's Ohio State record of 86 career goals.

Spooner had a record-breaking weekend in a weekend series versus St. Cloud State on January 6 and 7, 2012. She scored three goals and added one assist in a two-game set while becoming the Buckeyes' all-time leading goal scorer. Heading into the series, she was only three goals away from breaking the school record of 86 set by forward Jeni Creary. She tied the mark on January 6, 2012, as she scored both goals, including the game-winner. In addition, she was acknowledged as the First Star of the Game in a 2–0 win. The following day, she set the record at 5:27 of the third period versus St. Cloud State in a 4–3 loss. Spooner was named Third Star of the Game. After the game, Spooner had accumulated 140 career points (87 goals, 53 assists) to rank fourth in that category. She was now six points shy of breaking the Buckeyes' all-time scoring record.

In a January 27, 2012 defeat of the North Dakota Fighting Sioux, Natalie Spooner finished the game with two goals as the Buckeyes prevailed by a 6–2 mark. Her two goals were both on the power play (increasing her season total to seven). Spooner reached the 150 career point plateau with the goals, moving her into third all-time in Ohio State history. On February 11, 2012, Spooner was one of five Buckeyes seniors honoured as part of a pre-game ceremony. The Buckeyes were defeated by No. 2 Minnesota by a 7–4 mark. Natalie Spooner had a hand in all four Buckeye goals, with two goals and two assists.

On March 19, 2012, Spooner was named to the CCM All-America Team. She earned second-team honours, and it marked the first Spooner was named an All-American. She became the fourth Buckeye (behind Tessa Bonhomme, Jana Harrigan, and Emma Laaksonen. She concluded her senior season with 50 points (team-best) on 31 goals and 19 assists. Her 25 goals scored in WCHA conference action ranked second overall among all WCHA skaters. During the 2011–12 campaign, she had a team-best 16 multiple-point games while logging three hat tricks. In addition, Spooner notched nine multiple-goal games and four multiple-assist games this year.

Spooner concluded her career first overall in four program record lists. She owns the season goals record and the Ohio State career record in goals scored (broke record on January 7, 2012). At the end of her four seasons, she finished with 100. On October 14, 2011, Spooner broke the program record in career goals vs. WCHA opponents. For her career, she has had 75 goals versus WCHA opponents. Her 163 career points ranks second all-time among Buckeyes players, while her 16 game-winning goals are another program record. In 2019, she was inducted to the school's Hall of Fame.

=== Toronto Furies (2012-19) ===
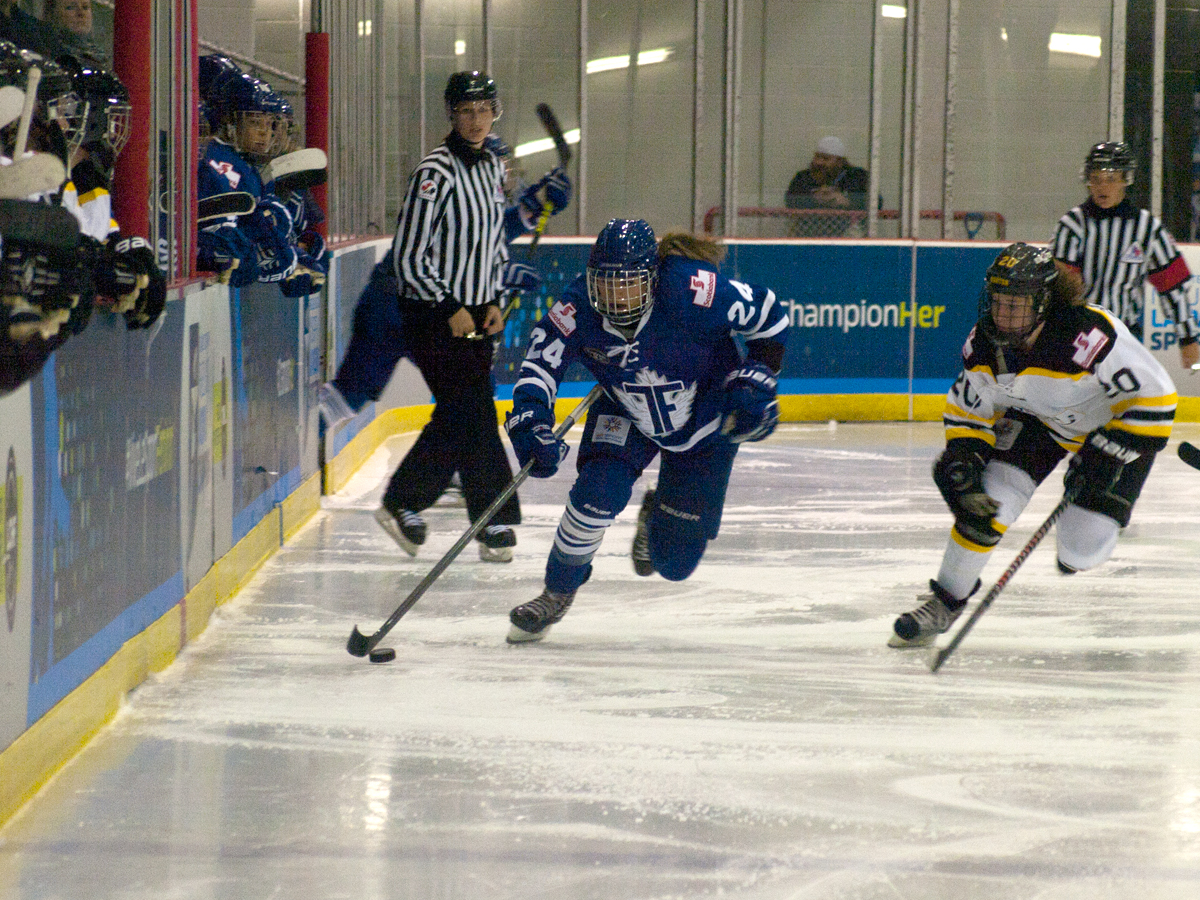
Spooner with the CWHL's Toronto Furies in 2015.

Selected in the second round, 7th overall, by the Toronto Furies in the 2012 CWHL Draft, Spooner set a franchise record for most goals by a rookie. She also finished second in team scoring, trailing scoring leader Rebecca Johnston.

Making her Toronto debut on October 20, 2012, in a road game at Brampton, Spooner scored a hat trick and assist, resulting in a four-point performance. As the Furies prevailed by a 4–3 count, Spooner factored into every one of the team's goals. Spooner's first point in the game was an assist to Mallory Deluce at the 7:18 mark of the first. Before the period expired, Spooner scored an unassisted shorthanded goal for the first in her CWHL career. Spooner scored short-handed again in the second period, as Deluce reciprocated with an assist. Spooner also provided the overtime heroics, logging the game-winning goal at the 1:26 mark of the extra frame, as Deluce gained her second assist of the night. For her efforts, Spooner was recognized as the First Star of the Game.

Spooner also registered a pair of three-point performances in her rookie season with the Furies. Against Team Alberta, Spooner had a goal and an assist in a 5–0 shutout win. A 7–4 road win at Brampton on January 12, 2013, resulted in Spooner's other three-point performance.

Spooner was the Furies leading scorer during the 2014 Clarkson Cup playoffs. She scored the game-winning goal in a March 21, 2014 playoff match against the Montreal Stars, eliminating them from the postseason. In the championship game against the Boston Blades, Spooner logged an assist on the Cup-clinching goal.

Spooner became the first player in Furies history to reach the plateau of 90 career points, achieving the feat during the 2016–17 CWHL season. In addition, she surpassed Kori Cheverie as the all-time leading scorer in Furies history. Spooner was one of two captains for Team Blue in the 3rd CWHL All-Star Game, the first time that one team in the CWHL All-Star Game had two captains.

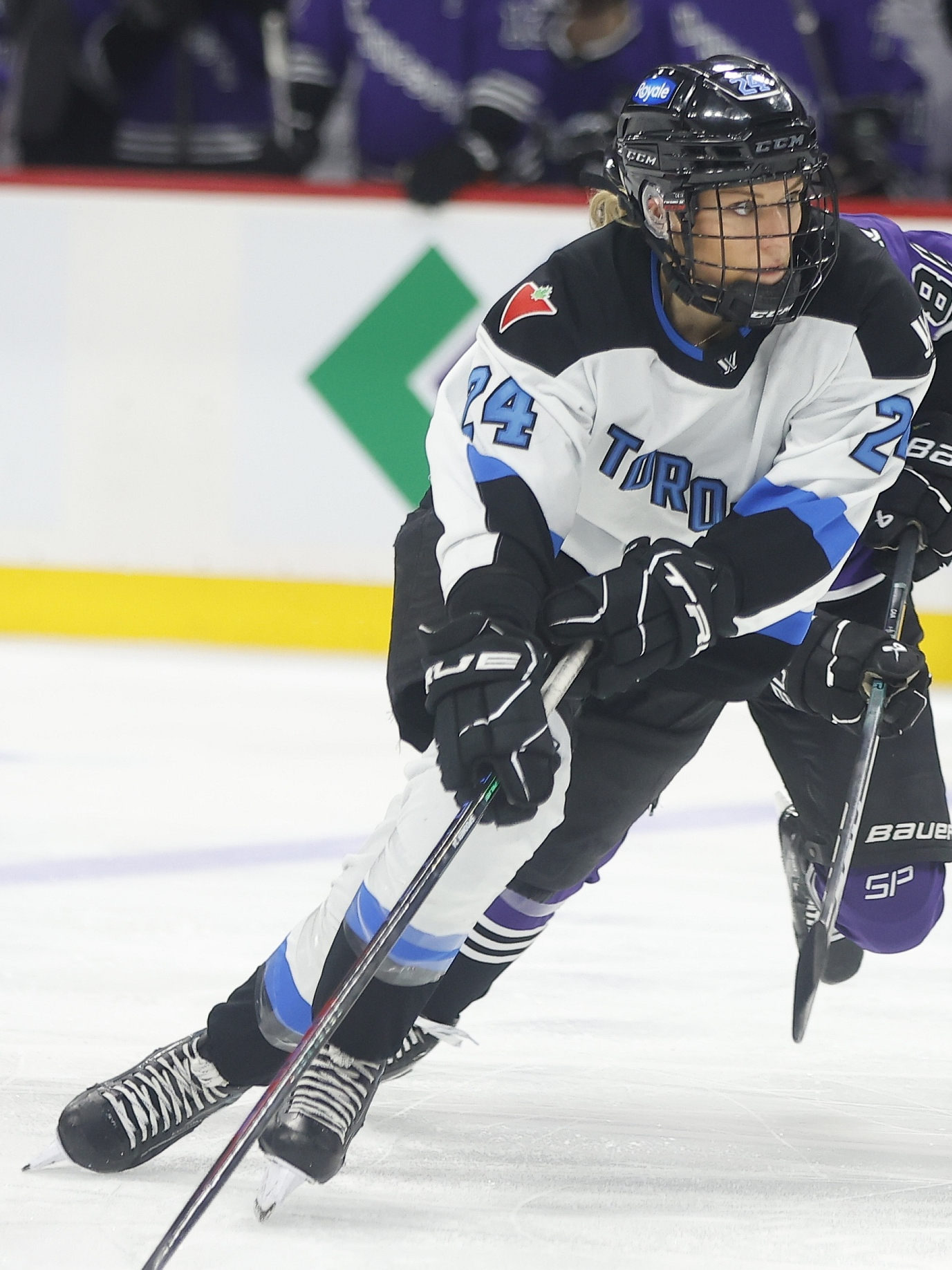
Spooner with PWHL Toronto in 2024

=== PWHPA (2019–23) ===
On May 2, 2019, over 200 women's hockey players announced via coordinated social media posts that they would boycott any professional league in North America for the 2019–20 season. The women behind the #ForTheGame movement included Spooner, Marie-Philip Poulin, Hillary Knight, Amanda Kessel, Sarah Nurse, Lee Stecklein, Rebecca Johnston, Shannon Szabados and Noora Räty. The players stated they were "coming together, not just as individual players, but as one collective voice to help navigate the future" of women's professional hockey.

Following the collapse of the CWHL in May 2019, Spooner joined the #ForTheGame movement and became a member of the PWHPA. The association organized the "Dream Gap Tour" that toured several cities in Canada and the United States, featuring community involvement events and exhibition games. Spooner competed for the PWHPA's Toronto-based team throughout the Dream Gap Tour series. In May 2022, the PWHPA signed a letter of intent with Billie Jean King Enterprises and the Mark Walter Group to explore launching a professional league. In February 2023, the PWHPA organized a formal union—the PWHLPA—to represent players and negotiate a collective bargaining agreement for the new league, and in June the Mark Walter Group acquired the Premier Hockey Federation. The CBA was ratified in July 2023.

=== Toronto Sceptres (2023-present) ===
On September 16, 2023, Spooner was selected in the fourth round, 23rd overall, by Toronto in the 2023 PWHL draft. On November 14, 2023, Spooner signed a two-year contract with the team. In the league's inaugural season, Spooner ranked first in both goals and points. Her 20 goals were nine more than the next best mark, a tie between Sarah Nurse and Grace Zumwinkle, and her 27 points were four clear of a three-way tie for second. She was named the SupraStar of the Month in February and March 2024.
Following the season she was named the Billie Jean King MVP, as most valuable player during the regular season, the PWHL Forward of the Year, PWHL 3 Stars of the Week leader and a PWHL First Team All-Star.

During the 2024–25 season, Spooner recorded three goals and two assists in 14 regular season games. During the 2025 PWHL playoffs, she recorded one assist in four games. On June 17, 2025, she signed a two-year contract extension the Sceptres.

== International play ==
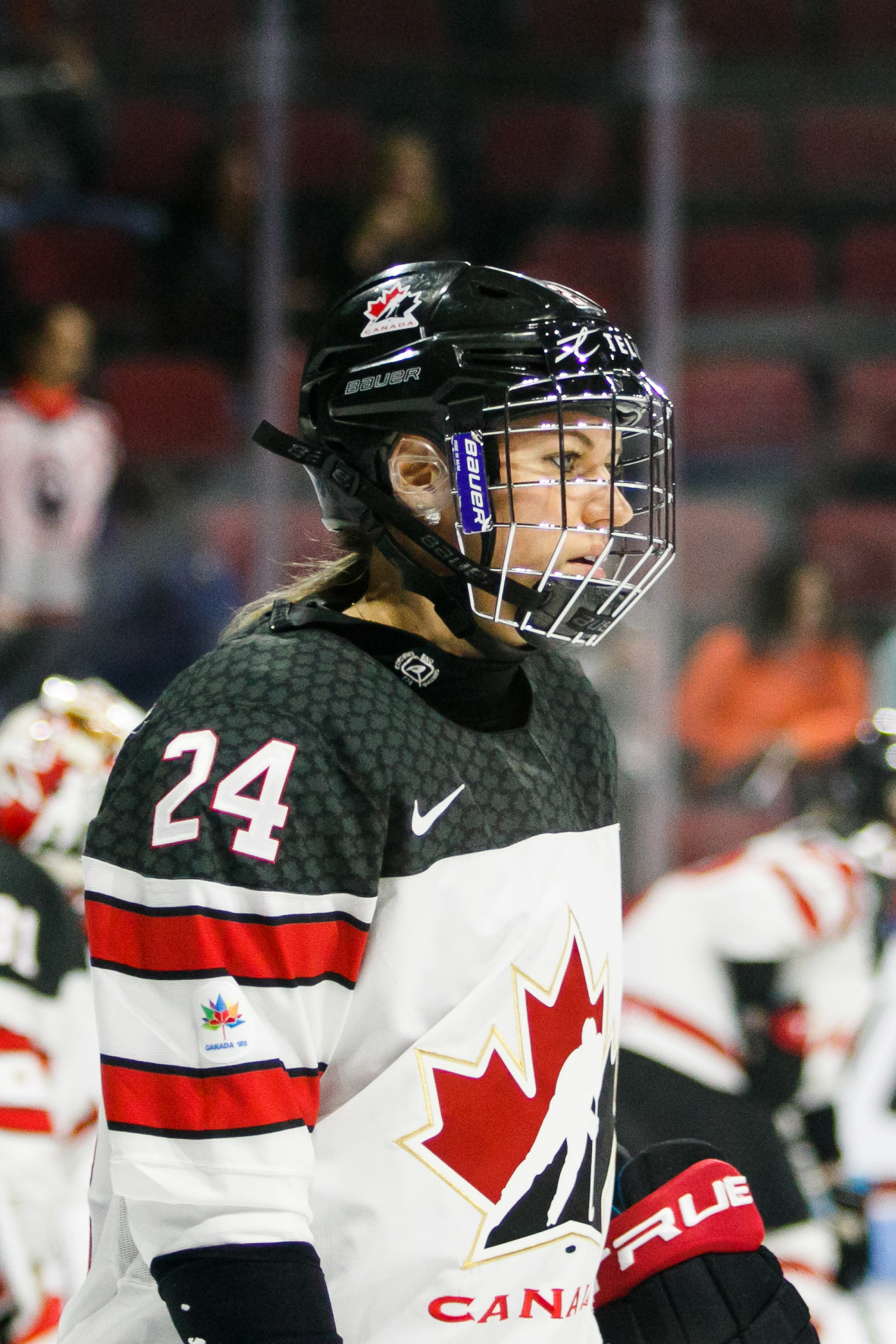
Natalie Spooner playing for Team Canada in 2017

Spooner was the first player to compete for the Canadian national under-18, under-22, and senior teams.

=== Youth ===
Spooner competed in the inaugural IIHF World Women's U-18 Championships in January 2008 and won the silver medal. In August 2007, the Canadian U-18 played a summer series against the U-18 Team USA squad, and Spooner was an assistant captain.

From 2008 to 2010, Spooner played on the Under-22 team. She won gold at the 2010 MLP Cup and silver at the 2009 MLP Cup. She played on the Canadian National Women's Team at the 2008 Four Nations Cup.

=== Senior ===
Spooner made her senior national team debut in 2007. She played for Canada at the 2008 4 Nations Cup, winning a silver medal. On November 10, 2010, Spooner scored a hat trick against Sweden in the 2010 4 Nations Cup. On November 10, 2010, Spooner scored a hat trick against Sweden in the 2010 4 Nations Cup. In the gold medal game of the 2011 4 Nations Cup, Spooner scored two goals in a 4–3 loss to the United States.

==== World Championships ====
Through her career, Spooner has won 11 World Championship medals: three gold (2012, 2021, 2024), seven silver (2011, 2013, 2015, 2016, 2023, 2025), and one bronze (2019).

Spooner competed in her first world championship at the 2011 IIHF Women's World Championship, helping Canada win a silver medal. The following year at the 2012 IIHF Women's World Championship, she tied for the team lead with four goals as Canada captured gold. In a preliminary round game versus Russia, Spooner scored a hat trick in a 14–1 victory.

After helping Canada win silver medals at the 2013 and 2015 World Championships, Spooner led the team in points with 10 at the 2019 IIHF Women's World Championship, though Canada finished with a bronze medal. She did not participate in the 2022 IIHF Women's World Championship in preparation for the birth of her son in December 2022. Just four weeks after his arrival, she resumed on-ice training and returned to help Canada win silver at the 2023 IIHF Women's World Championship. She scored Canada's opening goal in the tournament opener against Switzerland.

At the 2024 IIHF Women's World Championship, Spooner helped Canada win gold and was named the tournament's IIHF Female Player of the Year following the championship. She was also part of Canada's silver medal-winning team at the 2025 IIHF Women's World Championship.

==== Olympics ====
Spooner made her Olympic debut at the 2014 Winter Olympics in Sochi, where she played on a line with Hayley Wickenheiser and Meghan Agosta. In the semifinal against Switzerland, she scored the first two goals in Canada's 3–1 victory. She finished the tournament with two goals and two assists in five games. Canada went on to defeat the United States 3–2 in overtime in the gold medal game on February 20, 2014.

At the 2018 Winter Olympics in PyeongChang, Spooner was a member of Canada's silver medal-winning squad. Canada advanced to the gold medal game on February 22, 2018... Canada advanced to the gold medal game on February 22, 2018, facing the United States for the third consecutive Olympics. After Canada took a 2–1 lead on goals by Haley Irwin and Marie-Philip Poulin, the United States tied the game with 6:21 remaining in regulation. The game went to overtime and then to a shootout—the first in an Olympic women's hockey final. Canada lost 3–2 in the shootout, ending their streak of four consecutive Olympic gold medals. Following the loss, Spooner said, "Once you get the feeling of winning a gold medal, you want it again."

On January 11, 2022, Spooner was named to Canada's roster for the 2022 Winter Olympics in Beijing. She recorded three goals and 11 assists in seven games, tying with teammate Brianne Jenner for third in points scored in the tournament behind Sarah Nurse and Marie-Philip Poulin. Her 14 points in seven games ranked fourth among all players at the tournament. Canada defeated the United States 3–2 in the gold medal game on February 17, 2022, winning their fifth Olympic gold medal.

On January 9, 2026, she was named to Canada's roster to compete at the 2026 Winter Olympics.

=== Ball hockey ===
Spooner played for Team Canada at the Ball Hockey World Championship in Pilsen, Czech Republic, from June 13–20, 2009 and won gold at the event.

== Personal life ==
Spooner is married to Adam Redmond. She gave birth to their son in December 2022. She resumed on-ice training within four weeks, missing only eight weeks of hockey in total, and was ready to participate in the 2023 IIHF Women's World Championship in April 2023.

Spooner's brother Rick played hockey for the Wisconsin Badgers and currently plays for Seattle ESB. Her brother Doug played for the Waterloo Warriors in Ontario.

=== In popular culture ===
Along with Sochi teammate Meaghan Mikkelson, the pair were among the competing teams in the second season of The Amazing Race Canada in 2014. In the ice hockey skills challenge Detour, "Puck It", she combined with partner Mikkelson to shoot 4-for-4 on the 1 through 4 "hole" targets, then 1 out of 53 attempts to hit the final five-hole target. She and Mikkelson won seven legs of the race and finished in second place on the final leg.

In 2019, Spooner paired with Andrew Poje in the fifth season of CBC's Battle of the Blades. The pair finished in second place.

The renovation of Natalie and Adam's basement creating a home gym and laundry room was the focus of an episode of Save My Reno on HGTV in 2019.

In 2025, Spooner appeared as a guest on the third episode of Top Chef: Destination Canada.

== Career statistics ==
=== Regular season and playoffs ===
			Regular season					Playoffs
Season	Team	League	GP	G	A	Pts	PIM	GP	G	A	Pts	PIM
2005–06	Durham West Jr. Lightning	Prov. WHL	25	14	13	27	6	5	1	0	1	2
2006–07	Durham West Jr. Lightning	Prov. WHL	29	32	15	47	28	5	1	2	3	0
2007–08	Durham West Jr. Lightning	Prov. WHL	23	25	13	38	6	6	4	0	4	2
2007–08	Mississauga Chiefs	CWHL	—	—	—	—	—	3	0	0	0	2
2008–09	Ohio State University	WCHA	30	21	9	30	22	—	—	—	—	—
2009–10	Ohio State University	WCHA	35	22	22	44	16	—	—	—	—	—
2010–11	Ohio State University	WCHA	29	26	13	39	28	—	—	—	—	—
2010–11	Ohio State University	WCHA	29	26	13	39	28	—	—	—	—	—
2011–12	Ohio State University	WCHA	34	31	19	50	30	—	—	—	—	—
2012–13	Toronto Furies	CWHL	24	15	8	23	6	3	2	1	3	2
2013–14	Toronto Furies	CWHL	3	2	1	3	2	4	2	3	5	0
2013–14	Team Canada	AMHL	15	3	6	9	2	—	—	—	—	—
2014–15	Toronto Furies	CWHL	20	7	8	15	8	2	0	0	0	0
2015–16	Toronto Furies	CWHL	22	17	13	30	20	2	1	1	2	0
2016–17	Toronto Furies	CWHL	20	13	7	20	8	—	—	—	—	—
2017–18	Team Canada	AMHL	16	5	4	9	2	—	—	—	—	—
2018–19	Toronto Furies	CWHL	26	15	11	26	14	3	2	1	3	0
2020–21	Toronto	PWHPA	4	2	1	3	2	—	—	—	—	—
2022–23	Team Scotiabank	PWHPA	7	1	0	1	0	—	—	—	—	—
2023–24	PWHL Toronto	PWHL	24	20	7	27	4	3	1	1	2	0
2024–25	Toronto Sceptres	PWHL	14	3	2	5	2	4	0	1	1	2
2025–26	Toronto Sceptres	PWHL	30	3	5	8	6	—	—	—	—	—
CWHL totals			115	69	48	117	58	17	7	6	13	4
PWHL totals			68	26	14	40	12	7	1	2	3	2

=== International ===
Year	Team	Event	Result	GP	G	A	Pts	PIM
2008	Canada	U18	2nd place, silver medalist(s)	5	3	8	11	0
2011	Canada	WC	2nd place, silver medalist(s)	5	1	2	3	0
2012	Canada	WC	1st place, gold medalist(s)	5	4	2	6	4
2013	Canada	WC	2nd place, silver medalist(s)	5	2	0	2	0
2014	Canada	OG	1st place, gold medalist(s)	5	2	2	4	0
2015	Canada	WC	2nd place, silver medalist(s)	5	4	3	7	6
2016	Canada	WC	2nd place, silver medalist(s)	5	3	3	6	2
2017	Canada	WC	2nd place, silver medalist(s)	5	1	2	3	2
2018	Canada	OG	2nd place, silver medalist(s)	5	0	2	2	2
2019	Canada	WC	3rd place, bronze medalist(s)	7	6	4	10	4
2021	Canada	WC	1st place, gold medalist(s)	7	4	5	9	0
2022	Canada	OG	1st place, gold medalist(s)	7	3	11	14	0
2023	Canada	WC	2nd place, silver medalist(s)	7	2	4	6	4
2024	Canada	WC	1st place, gold medalist(s)	7	1	3	4	2
2025	Canada	WC	2nd place, silver medalist(s)	4	1	1	2	0
2026	Canada	OG	2nd place, silver medalist(s)	7	1	0	1	0
Junior totals				5	3	8	11	0
Senior totals				86	35	44	79	26

== Awards and honours ==
Award	Year	Ref
Juniors
PWHL silver medal	2006	
College
Ohio State Buckeyes Most Valuable Offensive Player	2009, 2010	
First Team All-WCHA	2010	
WCHA All-Academic Team	2010	
Academic All-Big Ten at-large selection	2010	
All-WCHA Second Team	2011	
Big Ten Outstanding Sportsmanship Award	2011	
CCM Hockey Women's Division I All-American Second Team	2012	
Ohio State Varsity O Hall of Fame	2019	
CWHL
Clarkson Cup champion	2014	
CWHL All-Star Game	2015, 2016, 2017, 2019	
PWHL
PWHL Top Goal Scorer	2024	
PWHL Points Leader	2024	
PWHL 3 Stars leader	2024	
PWHL Forward of the Year	2024	
Billie Jean King MVP Award	2024	
First All-Star Team	2024	
International
U18 silver medal	2008	
U18 best face-off percentage	2008	
Team Canada Top-3 Player	2008, 2015, 2021	
World Championship silver medal	2011, 2013, 2015, 2016, 2017, 2023, 2025	
World Championship gold medal	2012, 2021, 2024	
Olympic gold medal	2014, 2022	
World Championship All-Star Team	2015, 2021	
Olympic silver medal	2018	
World Championship bronze medal	2019	
IIHF Female Player of the Year	2024	

Records

- Durham West Jr. Lightning franchise leader in goals – 71
- Ohio State Buckeyes most goals in a season – 31 (2012)
- Ohio State Buckeyes franchise leader in goals – 100
- Toronto Furies most goals in a season – 17 (2016)
- Toronto Furies most points in a season – 30 (2016)
- Toronto Furies franchise leader in goals – 69
- Toronto Furies franchise leader in assists – 48
- Toronto Furies franchise leader in points – 117
- PWHL Toronto most goals in a season – 20 (2024)
- PWHL Toronto most points in a season – 27 (2024)
- PWHL Toronto franchise leader in goals – 20
- PWHL Toronto franchise leader in points – 27
- PWHL Toronto franchise leader in games played – 24

Other accomplishments

- Played with the WCHA All-Star Team against the United States Women's National Team in St. Paul, Minnesota (September 2009)
- Patty Kazmaier Award finalist (2012)
- Second place in The Amazing Race Canada season 2 (2014)
- Second place in Battle of the Blades season 5 (2019)
