= 2011–12 Minnesota Golden Gophers women's ice hockey season =

NCAA Champion Frozen Four Champions, 4–2 vs. Wisconsin
- Conference: 2 WCHA
- Home ice: Ridder Arena

Rankings
- USA Today/USA Hockey Magazine: 1
- USCHO.com/CBS College Sports: 1

Record
- Overall: 34–5–2
- Home: 18–1–2
- Road: 12–4–0
- Neutral: 4–0–0

Coaches and captains
- Head coach: Brad Frost
- Assistant coaches: Joel Johnson
- Captain(s): Sarah Erickson; Jen Schoullis

The 2011–12 Minnesota Golden Gophers women's ice hockey season represented the University of Minnesota during the 2011–12 NCAA Division I women's ice hockey season. They were coached by Brad Frost in his fifth season. The Gophers won their third NCAA women's Frozen Four championship.

== Offseason ==
=== News and notes ===
- August 8: Four Golden Gophers participated at the USA Hockey Festival. The festival occurred from August 10–20 at the Schwan Super Rink in Blaine, Minnesota. Megan Bozek, Amanda Kessel, Jen Schoullis and former Gopher Gigi Marvin were invited.
- August 19: USA Hockey announced the members of the U.S. Women's National Team that will compete in the 2011 IIHF 12 Nations Tournament Series, Aug. 24–31, in Vierumäki, Finland. The 22-player roster includes two current University of Minnesota players in sophomore forward Amanda Kessel and Jen Schoullis.

=== Recruiting ===
Player	Position	Nationality	Notes
Stephanie Anderson	United States	Forward	Played for the Minnesota Thoroughbreds
Rachel Bona	United States	Forward	Played at Coon Rapids High School
Meghan Lorence	United States	Forward	Played at Irondale High School
Rachel Ramsey	United States	Defense	Played at Minnetonka High School
Shyler Sletta	United States	Goaltender	Played at New Prague High School

== Regular season ==
=== Standings ===
2011–12 Western Collegiate Hockey Association standings
	Conference								Overall					
	GP	W	L	T	SW	PTS	GF	GA	GP	W	L	T	GF	GA
#1 Wisconsin†	28	23	3	2	1	72	113	44	37	31	4	2	170	53
#2 Minnesota*	28	21	5	2	1	66	113	43	37	30	5	2	167	50
#6 North Dakota	28	16	9	3	2	53	116	75	36	22	11	3	154	89
#9 Minnesota Duluth	28	15	12	1	1	47	91	61	36	21	13	1	121	77
Ohio State	28	13	14	1	1	41	75	96	36	16	16	4	99	115
Bemidji State	28	11	15	2	0	35	70	73	37	17	17	3	101	85
St. Cloud State	28	4	24	0	0	12	32	150	36	5	29	2	37	130
Minnesota State	28	3	24	1	0	10	37	105	36	7	28	1	64	133
Championship: Minnesota † indicates conference regular season champion * indicates conference tournament champion National rankings: Conference rankings: Updated March 23, 2012

=== Schedule ===
Date	Time	Opponent^{#}	Rank^{#}	Site	Decision	Result	Attendance	Record
Regular Season
September 30	7:07	Union*	#4	Ridder Arena • Minneapolis, MN (East-West Showcase)	Räty	W 6–1	1,028	1–0–0
October 1	7:07	Syracuse*	#4	Ridder Arena • Minneapolis, MN (East-West Showcase)	Räty	W 4–0	1,343	2–0–0
October 7	6:07	St. Cloud State	#3	Ridder Arena • Minneapolis, MN	Räty	W 6–0	457	3–0–0 (1–0–0)
October 8	4:07	St. Cloud State	#3	Ridder Arena • Minneapolis, MN	Räty	W 8–0	537	4–0–0 (2–0–0)
October 14	7:07	at #1 Wisconsin	#3	Kohl Center • Madison, WI	Räty	L 2–3	2,379	4–1–0 (2–1–0)
October 16	2:07	at #1 Wisconsin	#3	Kohl Center • Madison, WI	Räty	W 3–2	2,603	5–1–0 (3–1–0)
October 20	7:07	Minnesota State	#2	Ridder Arena • Minneapolis, MN	Sletta	W 3–0	1,044	6–1–0 (4–1–0)
October 21	6:07	Minnesota State	#2	Ridder Arena • Minneapolis, MN	Räty	W 7–0	727	7–1–0 (5–1–0)
October 28	7:07	at Bemidji State	#2	Sanford Center • Bemidji, MN	Räty	W 4–1	561	8–1–0 (6–1–0)
October 29	7:07	at Bemidji State	#2	Sanford Center • Bemidji, MN	Räty	L 1–2	587	8–2–0 (6–2–0)
November 4	6:07	#4 Minnesota Duluth	#3	Ridder Arena • Minneapolis, MN	Räty	W 4–1	928	9–2–0 (7–2–0)
November 5	4:07	#4 Minnesota Duluth	#3	Ridder Arena • Minneapolis, MN	Räty	W 3–2	1,940	10–2–0 (8–2–0)
November 18	7:07	New Hampshire*	#2	Ridder Arena • Minneapolis, MN	Räty	W 11–0	851	11–2–0 (8–2–0)
November 19	4:07	New Hampshire*	#2	Ridder Arena • Minneapolis, MN	Räty	W 6–1	661	12–2–0 (8–2–0)
November 26	3:00	at #9 Harvard*	#2	Bright Hockey Center • Cambridge, MA	Räty	W 2–1	627	13–2–0 (8–2–0)
November 27	1:00	at #9 Harvard*	#2	Bright Hockey Center • Cambridge, MA	Räty	W 7–3	561	14–2–0 (8–2–0)
December 2	7:07	at #5 North Dakota	#2	Ralph Engelstad Arena • Grand Forks, ND	Räty	W 7–2	3,789	15–2–0 (9–2–0)
December 3	7:07	at #5 North Dakota	#2	Ralph Engelstad Arena • Grand Forks, ND	Räty	L 0–3	1,617	15–3–0 (9–3–0)
December 10	2:07	Ohio State	#2	Ridder Arena • Minneapolis, MN	Räty	W 4–1	1,225	16–3–0 (10–3–0)
December 11	2:07	Ohio State	#2	Ridder Arena • Minneapolis, MN	Räty	W 3–1	1,207	17–3–0 (11–3–0)
January 6	7:07	#1 Wisconsin	#2	Ridder Arena • Minneapolis, MN	Räty	T 3–3 ^{SO}	2,554	17–3–1 (11–3–1)
January 7	4:07	#1 Wisconsin	#2	Ridder Arena • Minneapolis, MN	Räty	W 1–0	2,666	18–3–1 (12–3–1)
January 13	7:07	at #8 Minnesota Duluth	#1	AMSOIL Arena • Duluth, MN	Räty	L 2–4	2,100	18–4–1 (12–4–1)
January 14	7:07	at #8 Minnesota Duluth	#1	AMSOIL Arena • Duluth, MN	Räty	W 3–0	1,944	19–4–1 (13–4–1)
January 20	6:07	Bemidji State	#2	Ridder Arena • Minneapolis, MN	Räty	W 3–2	1,619	20–4–1 (14–4–1)
January 21	4:07	Bemidji State	#2	Ridder Arena • Minneapolis, MN	Räty	T 3–3 ^{SO}	1,598	20–4–2 (14–4–2–1)
January 27	7:07	at Minnesota State	#3	Verizon Wireless Center • Mankato, MN	Räty	W 6–3	398	21–4–2 (15–4–2–1)
January 28	3:07	at Minnesota State	#3	Verizon Wireless Center • Mankato, MN	Räty	W 4–1	324	22–4–2 (16–4–2–1)
February 3	7:07	at St. Cloud State	#2	Herb Brooks National Hockey Center • St. Cloud, MN	Räty	W 8–1	619	23–4–2 (17–4–2–1)
February 4	2:07	at St. Cloud State	#2	Herb Brooks National Hockey Center • St. Cloud, MN	Räty	W 7–0	344	24–4–2 (18–4–2–1)
February 10	6:07	at Ohio State	#2	Ohio State University Ice Rink • Columbus, OH	Räty	W 5–0	344	25–4–2 (19–4–2–1)
February 11	4:07	at Ohio State	#2	Ohio State University Ice Rink • Columbus, OH	Räty	W 7–4	520	26–4–2 (20–4–2–1)
February 17	6:07	#5 North Dakota	#2	Ridder Arena • Minneapolis, MN	Räty	L 1–2 ^{OT}	1,925	26–5–2 (20–5–2–1)
February 18	4:07	#5 North Dakota	#2	Ridder Arena • Minneapolis, MN	Räty	W 5–2	2,157	27–5–2 (21–5–2–1)
WCHA Tournament
February 24	7:07	St. Cloud State*	#2	Ridder Arena • Minneapolis, MN (WCHA First Round, Game 1)	Räty	W 6–1	768	28–5–2
February 25	4:07	St. Cloud State*	#2	Ridder Arena • Minneapolis, MN (WCHA First Round, Game 2)	Räty	W 6–0	793	29–5–2
March 2	7:30	vs. #5 North Dakota*	#2	AMSOIL Arena • Duluth, MN (WCHA Final Faceoff)	Räty	W 6–0	1,147	30–5–2
March 3	7:07	at #4 Minnesota Duluth*	#2	AMSOIL Arena • Duluth, MN (WCHA Final Faceoff)	Räty	W 2–0	1,269	31–5–2
NCAA Tournament
March 10	4:00	#5 North Dakota*	#2	Ridder Arena • Minneapolis, MN (NCAA Tournament, First Round)	Räty	W 5–1	1,630	32–5–2
March 16	8:07	vs. #3 Cornell*	#2	AMSOIL Arena • Duluth, MN (NCAA Frozen Four)	Räty	W 3–1	2,052	33–5–2
March 18	3:07	vs. #1 Wisconsin*	#2	AMSOIL Arena • Duluth, MN (NCAA Championship Game)	Räty	W 4–2	2,439	34–5–2
*Non-conference game. ^{#}Rankings from USCHO.com Poll.

=== News and notes ===
- October 14: Jen Schoullis and Amanda Kessel, were named to the Team USA roster that will participate in the 2011 Four Nations Cup from Nov. 9–13 in Sweden. In addition, former Gophers player Gigi Marvin was named to the roster.
- October 16: The Gophers defeated the top ranked Wisconsin Badgers in Madison, Wisconsin by a 3–2 tally. It was the first loss for the Badgers since November 2010. In addition, the Gophers earned their first win at the Kohl Centre since 2007.
- November 18: Minnesota skater Amanda Kessel registered 5 points (including four goals)as the Golden Gophers defeated the New Hampshire Wildcats by an 11–0 tally. New Hampshire starting goalie Jenn Gilligan made 27 saves but allowed eight goals in two periods. She was replaced by Moe Bradley in the third period. Bradley stopped 11 of 14 shots as the Wildcats suffered their worst loss in the 35 year history of the program.
- November 19: Kessel earned her second hat trick of the series as the Gophers defeated New Hampshire by a 6–1 tally. Senior Jen Schoullis factored on every goal, as she tied the Gophers record for assists in a game with five. With three points in the first period, Schoullis also set a career record for points in a period.

=== Roster ===
No.	Nat.	Player	Class	Pos	Height	DoB	Hometown	Previous team
2		Kelly Seeler	Senior	D	5' 6" (1.68 m)	1990-05-18	Eden Prairie, Minnesota	Eden Prairie High School
3		Samantha Downey	Junior	F	5' 9" (1.75 m)	1991-02-19	Silver Bay, Minnesota	Proctor High School
4		Sarah Erickson	Senior	F	5' 6" (1.68 m)	1990-03-28	Roseau, Minnesota	Bemidji High School
5		Rachel Ramsey	Freshman	D	6' 0" (1.83 m)	1992-10-14	Chanhassen, Minnesota	Minnetonka High School
6		Katie Frischmann	Junior	F/D	5' 5" (1.65 m)	1991-01-06	Rochester, Minnesota	Minnesota Thoroughbreds
7		Mira Jalosuo	Junior	D	6' 0" (1.83 m)	1989-02-03	Lieksa, Finland	Finland women's national ice hockey team
8		Amanda Kessel	Sophomore	F	5' 6" (1.68 m)	1991-08-28	Madison, Wisconsin	Shattuck-Saint Mary's
9		Sarah Davis	Sophomore	F	5' 4" (1.63 m)	1988-04-24	Paradise, Newfoundland	Warner Hockey School
10		Kelly Terry	Sophomore	F	5' 6" (1.68 m)	1992-06-06	Whitby, Ontario	Sinclair Secondary School
11		Becky Kortum	Junior	F	5' 7" (1.7 m)	1991-05-07	Minnetonka, Minnesota	Hopkins High School
12		Ashley Stenerson	Sophomore	F/D	5' 5" (1.65 m)	1991-10-09	Moorhead, Minnesota	Moorhead High School
15		Rachael Bona	Freshman	F	5' 5" (1.65 m)	1992-10-25	Coon Rapids, Minnesota	Coon Rapids High School
16		Bethany Brausen	Sophomore	F	5' 5" (1.65 m)	1992-05-16	Little Canada, Minnesota	Roseville Area High School
17		Emily West	Senior (RS)	F	5' 5" (1.65 m)	1989-03-22	Colorado Springs, Colorado	Pine Creek High School
18		Nikki Ludwigson	Senior	F	5' 7" (1.7 m)	1989-09-18	Bloomington, Minnesota	Eden Prairie High School
19		Megan Bozek	Junior	D	5' 9" (1.75 m)	1991-03-27	Buffalo Grove, Illinois	Chicago Mission
20		Meghan Lorence	Freshman	F	5' 7" (1.7 m)	1992-06-25	Mounds View, Minnesota	Irondale High School
22		Anne Schleper	Senior	D	5' 10" (1.78 m)	1990-01-30	St. Cloud, Minnesota	Cathedral High School
24		Jen Schoullis	Senior (RS)	F	5' 9" (1.75 m)	1989-03-07	Erie, Pennsylvania	Shattuck-Saint Mary's
27		Baylee Gillanders	Sophomore	D	5' 11" (1.8 m)	1992-08-09	Kyle, Saskatchewan	Warner Hockey School
28		Stephanie Anderson	Freshman	F	5' 9" (1.75 m)	1992-11-27	North Saint Paul, Minnesota	Minnesota Thoroughbreds
31		Shyler Sletta	Freshman	G	5' 5" (1.65 m)	1993-05-22	Elko New Market, Minnesota	New Prague High School
33		Alyssa Grogan	Senior	G	5' 6" (1.68 m)	1990-05-15	Eagan, Minnesota	Eagan High School
41		Noora Räty	Junior	G	5' 5" (1.65 m)	1989-05-29	Espoo, Finland	Finland women's national ice hockey team

== Awards and honors ==
- Rachael Bona, WCHA Rookie of the Week (Week of January 23, 2012)
- Megan Bozek, WCHA Defensive Player of the Week (Week of December 7, 2011)
- Alyssa Grogan, Nominee, 2012 Hockey Humanitarian Award
- Amanda Kessel, WCHA Co-Offensive Player of the Week (Week of October 12, 2011)
- Amanda Kessel, WCHA Co-Offensive Player of the Week (Week of November 21, 2011)
- Amanda Kessel, WCHA Player of the Week (Week of February 8, 2012)
- Noora Räty, WCHA Defensive Player of the Week (Week of November 8, 2011)
- Emily West, WCHA Player of the Week (Week of February 1, 2012)

=== Postseason awards ===
- Noora Räty, 2012 NCAA Frozen Four Most Outstanding Player
- Megan Bozek, 2011–12 CCM Hockey Women’s Division I All-American: First Team
- Megan Bozek, 2011–12 Minnesota Golden Gophers Female Athlete of the Year
- Anne Schleper, 2012 Big Ten Medal of Honor
