= 2011–12 Ohio State Buckeyes women's ice hockey season =

- Conference: WCHA
- Home ice: OSU Ice Arena

Rankings
- USA Today/USA Hockey Magazine: Not ranked
- USCHO.com/CBS College Sports: Not ranked

Record

Coaches and captains
- Head coach: Nate Handrahan
- Assistant coaches: Josh Liegl; Alison Domenico
- Alternate captain(s): Natalie Spooner, Kelly Wild, Laura McIntosh

The Ohio State Buckeyes women's ice hockey team represented Ohio State University in the 2011–12 NCAA Division I women's ice hockey season. The Buckeyes attempted to win their first NCAA women's Frozen Four championship. Canadian Natalie Spooner entered her senior season with the Buckeyes. Spooner ranked second in career goals with 69 and was sixth in Buckeyes career points with 113.

== Offseason ==
=== News and notes ===
- August 5: Seniors Natalie Spooner and Laura McIntosh were invited by Hockey Canada to participate in the National Women's Under-22 training camp from August 7–16 at the Canadian International Hockey Academy in Rockland, Ontario.
- August 24: Minttu Tuominen and former Buckeyes Tessa Bonhomme and Lisa Chesson are competing at the 2011 IIHF 12 Nations Tournament in Finland from August 24-Sept. 4.

=== Recruiting ===
Player	Nationality	Position	Notes
Stacy Danczak	United States	Goaltender	Played with the Ohio Flames
Danielle Gagne	Canada	Forward	Gagne competed with the Mississauga Chiefs
Taylor Kuehl	United States	Forward	She was a member of the United States Under 18 national team
Kari Schmitt	United States	Defense	She competed with Belle Tire in Michigan
Sara Schmitt	United States	Defense	She competed with Belle Tire in Michigan
Kayla Sullivan	United States	Forward	Played hockey at Shattuck-Saint Mary's

== Exhibition ==
Date	Opponent	Location	Time	Score	Goal scorers
9/23/2011	Laurier Golden Hawks women's ice hockey	Columbus, OH	7:07 pm	Ohio State, 3-1	Kayla Sullivan, Danielle Gagne, Melissa Feste

== Regular season ==
- October 14: Laura McIntosh notched her first goal of the season to give the Buckeyes a 2–1 lead. Said goal would stand as the game-winner. In addition, she picked up an assist on a Hokey Langan goal. The assist made McIntosh Ohio State's all-time leader in career points against WCHA opponents. She surpassed Jana Harrigan's 110 league points set in 2006.
- November 25: Natalie Spooner scored four goals for the third time in her NCAA career, including a natural hat trick as the Buckeyes enjoyed a home-ice conference victory over Minnesota Duluth. She scored all four goals as the final score was 4–1 in the Buckeyes favor. It was the second time in the 2011-12 campaign that she scored four goals in a game. The natural hat trick (three consecutive goals) was scored in the second period as the Buckeyes faced a 1–0 deficit against the Bulldogs. The eventual game-winner was scored at 10:56 of the second period. The hat trick was the fifth of her collegiate career. The four goal performance moved Spooner to fourth overall on the Buckeye career points list with 129. Spooner is now four goals away from tying Jeni Creary's Ohio State record of 86 career goals.
- January 27: Three Buckeyes reached milestones in a 6–2 upset of North Dakota. Laura McIntosh finished the game with three assists. Natalie Spooner totaled two goals and Hokey Langan finished with two assists. McIntosh's three helpers moved her into a tie for the all-time lead on Ohio State's all-time career points list. Her 160 career points are now tied with former Buckeye Jana Harrigan. The two goals by Spooner were both on the power-play (increasing her season total to seven). With the goals, Spooner reached the 150 career point plateau, moving her into third all-time in Ohio State history. The two assists from Langan helped her reach the 100-point milestone, only the eighth Buckeyes player to reach the mark.
- February 4: The Buckeyes defeated No. 9 Minnesota Duluth by a 4–3 mark at the AMSOIL Arena. Laura McIntosh broke the Buckeyes all-time scoring record with three points, while Natalie Spooner notched a hat trick for the Buckeyes. Prior to the game, McIntosh was tied with Jana Harrigan with 160 career points. She now is the all-time leaders with 163 points. The hat trick by Spooner was her third of the season (and sixth in her career). Spooner stands third overall in career points with 156.
- February 11: The Buckeyes were defeated by No. 2 Minnesota by a 7–4 mark. Natalie Spooner had a hand in all four Buckeye goals, with two goals and two assists. A pre-game ceremony was held to honour the Buckeyes five seniors: Brittany Carlson, Natalie Spooner, Kelly Wild, Melissa Feste and Laura McIntosh.

=== Standings ===
2011–12 Western Collegiate Hockey Association standings
	Conference								Overall					
	GP	W	L	T	SW	PTS	GF	GA	GP	W	L	T	GF	GA
#1 Wisconsin†	28	23	3	2	1	72	113	44	37	31	4	2	170	53
#2 Minnesota*	28	21	5	2	1	66	113	43	37	30	5	2	167	50
#6 North Dakota	28	16	9	3	2	53	116	75	36	22	11	3	154	89
#9 Minnesota Duluth	28	15	12	1	1	47	91	61	36	21	13	1	121	77
Ohio State	28	13	14	1	1	41	75	96	36	16	16	4	99	115
Bemidji State	28	11	15	2	0	35	70	73	37	17	17	3	101	85
St. Cloud State	28	4	24	0	0	12	32	150	36	5	29	2	37	130
Minnesota State	28	3	24	1	0	10	37	105	36	7	28	1	64	133
Championship: Minnesota † indicates conference regular season champion * indicates conference tournament champion National rankings: Conference rankings: Updated March 23, 2012

=== Schedule ===
Date	Opponent	Location	Time	Score
10/07/11	vs. Bemidji St	Columbus, Ohio	7:07 p.m. ET	4-4
10/08/11	vs. Bemidji St	Columbus, Ohio	4:07 p.m. ET	5-3
10/14/11	vs. St. Cloud State	Columbus, Ohio	7:07 p.m. ET	5-1
10/15/11	vs. St. Cloud State	Columbus, Ohio	4:07 p.m. ET	5-1
10/21/11	at North Dakota	Grand Forks, N.D.	8:07 p.m. ET	1-11
10/22/11	at North Dakota	Grand Forks, N.D.	8:07 p.m. ET	1-7
10/28/11	at Minnesota State	Mankato, Minn.	8:07 p.m. ET	2-1
10/29/11	at Minnesota State	Mankato, Minn.	4:07 p.m. ET	1-0
11/04/11	vs. Wisconsin	Columbus, Ohio	7:07 p.m. ET	1-3
11/05/11	vs. Wisconsin	Columbus, Ohio	7:07 p.m. ET	0-2
11/18/11	at Syracuse	Syracuse, N.Y.	7:00 p.m. ET	6-3
11/19/11	at Syracuse	Syracuse, N.Y.	4:00 p.m. ET	4-3
11/25/11	vs. Minnesota Duluth	Columbus, Ohio	7:07 p.m. ET	
11/26/11	vs. Minnesota Duluth	Columbus, Ohio	4:07 p.m. ET	
12/02/11	vs. Niagara	Columbus, Ohio	7:07 p.m. ET	
12/03/11	vs. Niagara	Columbus, Ohio	2:07 p.m. ET	
12/10/11	at Minnesota	Minneapolis, Minn.	3:07 p.m. ET	
12/11/11	at Minnesota	Minneapolis, Minn.	3:07 p.m. ET	
12/30/11	vs. Princeton	Columbus, Ohio	4:07 p.m. ET	
12/31/11	vs. Princeton	Columbus, Ohio	2:07 p.m. ET	
01/06/12	at St. Cloud State	St. Cloud, Minn.	8:07 p.m. ET	
01/07/12	at St. Cloud State	St. Cloud, Minn.	5:07 p.m. ET	
01/13/12	at Bemidji St	Bemidji, Minn.	8:07 p.m. ET	
01/14/12	at Bemidji St	Bemidji, Minn.	8:07 p.m. ET	
01/20/12	vs. Minnesota State	Columbus, Ohio	7:07 p.m. ET	
01/21/12	vs. Minnesota State	Columbus, Ohio	4:07 p.m. ET	
01/27/12	vs. North Dakota	Columbus, Ohio	7:07 p.m. ET	
01/28/12	vs. North Dakota	Columbus, Ohio	4:07 p.m. ET	
02/03/12	at Minnesota Duluth	Duluth, Minn.	8:07 p.m. ET	
02/04/12	at Minnesota Duluth	Duluth, Minn.	8:07 p.m. ET	
02/10/12	vs. Minnesota	Columbus, Ohio	7:07 p.m. ET	
02/11/12	vs. Minnesota	Columbus, Ohio	4:07 p.m. ET	
02/17/12	at Wisconsin	Madison, Wisc.	3:07 p.m. ET	
02/18/12	at Wisconsin	Madison, Wisc.	3:07 p.m. ET	

==== Conference record ====
WCHA school	Record
Bemidji State	
Minnesota	
Minnesota State	
Minnesota Duluth	
North Dakota	
St. Cloud State	
Wisconsin	

== Awards and honors ==
- Taylor Kuehl, WCHA Rookie of the Week (Week of November 21, 2011)
- Laura McIntosh, WCHA Player of the Week (Week of October 18, 2011)
- Natalie Spooner, WCHA Co-Offensive Player of the Week (Week of October 12, 2011)
- Natalie Spooner, WCHA Offensive Player of the Week (Week of November 28, 2011)
- Natalie Spooner, 2011-12 CCM Hockey Women's Division I All-American: Second Team
- Lisa Steffes, WCHA Defensive Player of the Week (Week of November 1, 2011)

== CWHL Draft ==
- The following were selected in the 2012 CWHL Draft.

Round	Pick	Player	Team
2	7	Natalie Spooner	Toronto Furies
3	13	Laura McIntosh	Brampton Thunder
