= Haley Irwin =

Canadian ice hockey player (born 1988)

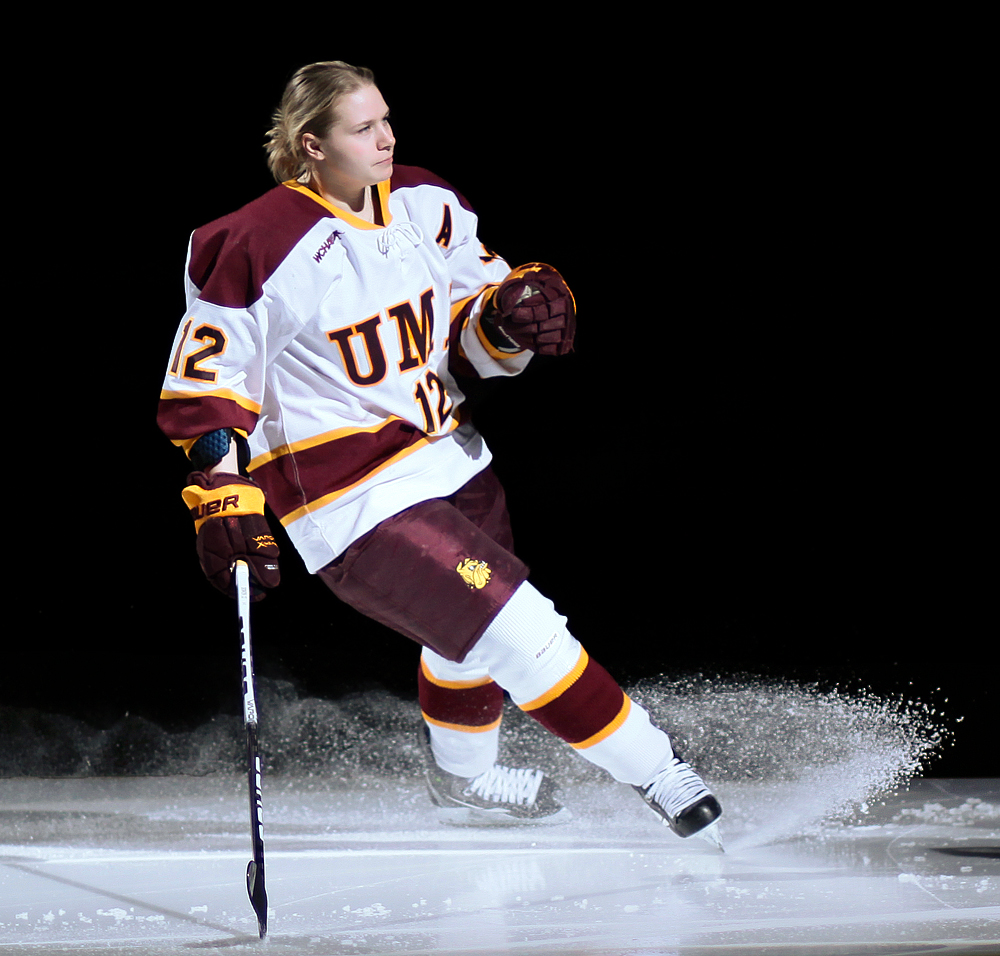
- Former University of Minnesota Duluth Bulldogs forward Haley Irwin, February 26, 2011
- Born: June 6, 1988 (age 38) Thunder Bay, Ontario, Canada
- Height: 5 ft 7 in (170 cm)
- Weight: 170 lb (77 kg; 12 st 2 lb)
- Position: Forward
- Shoots: Left
- CWHL team Former teams: Calgary Inferno: Toronto Aeros; Minnesota Duluth Bulldogs; Les Canadiennes de Montreal
- National team: Canada
- Playing career: 2005–present
Medal record
Olympic Games
Gold medal – first place	2010 Vancouver	Team
Gold medal – first place	2014 Sochi	Team
Silver medal – second place	2018 Pyeongchang	Team
World Championships
Gold medal – first place	2012 United States
Silver medal – second place	2009 Finland
Silver medal – second place	2011 Switzerland
Silver medal – second place	2013 Canada
Silver medal – second place	2017 United States

Haley Lyn Irwin (born June 6, 1988) is a Canadian ice hockey player. She was a member of the 2009–10 Hockey Canada national women's team and played for the Calgary Inferno and Montreal Stars of the Canadian Women's Hockey League (CWHL) and played for the University of Minnesota Duluth Bulldogs in the NCAA. She served as Canada's captain in a gold-medal winning effort at the 2014 4 Nations Cup in Kamloops, British Columbia.

== Playing career ==
Irwin grew up playing boys hockey until she was 16 and was the first girl to make a AAA-level boys team in Thunder Bay, ON. After moving to women's hockey, she made Canada's national Under-22 team. Irwin was part of the gold medal winning Ontario Red squad at the January 2005 National Women's Under-18 Championship in Salmon Arm, B.C. Irwin won the PWHL championship and OWHA provincial championship in 2005 and 2006 with the Toronto Jr. Aeros. She captained the undefeated 2005–06 team and was named the Aeros MVP in both 2004–05 and 2005–06. During the 2005–06 season, she finished third in league scoring with the Aeros. She also made appearances with the Aeros senior team in the 2005–06 and 2006–07 seasons in the National Women's Hockey League.

She won a bronze medal with Team Ontario 1 at the 2007 Esso Women's Nationals in Salmon Arm, BC. Other accomplishments include winning a gold medal with Team Ontario at the 2005 Esso Women's Nationals in Sarnia, ON. At the January 2005 National Women's Under-18 Championship in Salmon Arm, BC, she won a gold medal with Team Ontario Red. She won a gold medal with Team Ontario at the 2003 Canada Winter Games in Bathurst, NB. One of her teammates with Team Ontario was Meghan Agosta.

=== Minnesota Duluth Bulldogs ===
University of Minnesota Duluth women's hockey coach and former Canadian Olympic coach Shannon Miller recruited Irwin for UMD. When Irwin arrived in the fall of 2007 for her first season with the Bulldogs, she came in with more of an offensive game. She was not killing penalties and there were issues with her off-ice training and her weight. Miller made her fill out training logs, journaling all her workouts and her meals.

For the 2007–08 season, Irwin led UMD and the Western Collegiate Hockey Association (WCHA) in scoring, was the league's Rookie of the Year and had the most points per game of any female U.S. college hockey player. For her effort, she was named WCHA Rookie of the Year and to the WCHA First All-Star, WCHA All-Rookie and WCHA All-Tournament teams.

She scored the game-winning goal to help UMD win the 2008 NCAA Division I national championship. The goal was vs. University of Wisconsin goaltender and Patty Kazmaier Award winner Jessie Vetter. At UMD, Irwin benefitted from two Olympic hockey players who were assistant coaches: Canada's Caroline Ouellette and Team USA's Julie Chu.

During a second season at UMD, Irwin scored 22 goals and 44 points in 39 games as the Bulldogs advanced to another NCAA Frozen Four tournament. She was named to the All-WCHA Team, ranked third in UMD scoring and second in goals scored. Irwin led all Bulldog sophomores in goals, points and power play goals.

On December 3 and 4, 2010, Haley Irwin had a hand in every one of her teams’ seven goals versus St. Cloud State. For her efforts, she was recognized as the WCHA Offensive Player of the Week for December 7, 2010. In both games against the Huskies, she had a total of three goals and four assists. She notched two assists, 12 shots on net and was +2 in a 2–2 tie on December 3. The following day, Irwin posted an assist on the first goal (which was also the game-winning goal) before she scored three straight goals and had a natural hat-trick. The hat-trick was Irwin's third of the season and was followed with an assist on the Bulldogs' fifth goal. Irwin recorded ten shots and was +2 in the game. At the conclusion of the series, Irwin became the WCHA leader in scoring and ranked No. 2 in the NCAA with a point per game average of 2.29 (32 points: 17 goals, 15 assists in 14 games).

On September 7, 2011, it was announced that Irwin was appointed one of two team captains for the 2011–12 Minnesota Duluth Bulldogs women's ice hockey season. In a 7–1 victory over MSU-Mankato on February 18, 2012, Irwin netted the 200th point of her NCAA career. She became the sixth Bulldog to score 200 career points as she registered a power play goal in the first period.

=== Hockey Canada ===
Named to 2014 Olympic roster for Canada. After her freshman season at UMD, Irwin played in two more international competitions with Canada's Under-22 team. At the 2009 IIHF Women's World Ice Hockey Championships, she had two goals and three assists in five games for Canada in its silver medal performance. In addition, Irwin won gold at the Four Nations Cup. After her appearance on Canada's 2009 silver medal winning World Championship team, she was invited to centralize for six months in Calgary along with 25 other players and try for one of the 21 spots on the 2010 Olympic team. During the 2009 Hockey Canada Cup in Vancouver, Irwin scored on a penalty shot during Canada's 10–2 victory over Finland on September 1, 2009. During the 2010 Winter Olympics, Irwin played five games, scoring four goals and one assist. In the gold medal game, Canada defeated the United States 2–0 to win their third consecutive gold. In the first game of the 2011 IIHF Eight Nations Tournament, Irwin scored two goals in a 16–0 victory over Switzerland. In the third game of the tournament, she scored two goals in an 11–0 shutout over Slovakia.

=== Canadian Women's Hockey League ===
Irwin was selected by the Brampton Thunder in the first round of the Canadian Women's Hockey League (CWHL) draft held on July 14, 2012, in Mississauga, Ontario, the third player drafted overall. She relocated to Montreal and was transferred to the Montreal Stars. She would appear with the club in the finals of the 2013 Clarkson Cup. In the summer of 2014, she was traded to the Calgary Inferno for future considerations.

== Coaching career ==
Irwin started her first season coaching at the Provincial Women's Hockey League level in the 2018-2019 season with the Barrie Sharks Junior Hockey team, in Barrie Ontario. On July 29, 2019, Irwin was hired to serve on Lisa Haley's coaching staff with the Ryerson Rams women's ice hockey program. Irwin was named Interim Head Coach of the Ottawa Charge in the Professional Women's Hockey League on April 6, 2026.

== Awards and honours ==
- 2007–08 WCHA Rookie of the Year
- 2007–08 All-WCHA First Team
- 2007–08 All-WCHA Rookie Team.
- 2008–09 All-WCHA Third Team
- 2008–09 Finalist, WCHA Pre-season Most Valuable Player
- WCHA Offensive Player of the Week, week of February 18, 2009
- WCHA Offensive Player of the Week Week of December 7, 2010
- WCHA Offensive Player of the Week (Week of December 7, 2010)
- 2011 Patty Kazmaier Award Nominee
- WCHA Offensive Player of the Week (Week of December 7, 2011)
- WCHA Offensive Player of the Week (Week of February 22, 2012)

== Career statistics ==
=== Minnesota Duluth ===
- Note: GP= Games played; G= Goals; AST= Assists; PTS = Points; PPG = Power Play Goals; SHG = Shorthanded Goals

Year	GP	G	AST	PTS	PPG	SHG
2007–08	37	23	37	60	3	3
2008–09	39	22	22	44	8	0
2010–11	24	18	30	52	1	0
2011–12	34	16	38	54	4	0

=== Team Canada ===
Event	Games played	Goals	Assists	Points	PIM
2007 National Fall Festival	6	0	0	0	2
2009 Women's World Championships	5	2	3	5	2
2010 Olympics	5	4	1	5	4

=== CWHL ===
Year	Team	Games Played	Goals	Assists	Points	+/-	PIM	PPG	SHG	GWG
2012–13	Montreal Stars	0								
2014–15	Calgary Inferno	13	8	12	20	+15	2	4	0	1
