= TMU Bold women's ice hockey =

Toronto Metropolitan University Bold women's ice hockey program

- University: Toronto Metropolitan University
- Conference: OUA; East Division
- Governing Body: U Sports
- Head coach: Lisa Haley; 8th season, 70–128–17
- Assistant coaches: Ken Dufton; Haley Irwin
- Arena: Mattamy Athletic Centre; Toronto
- Colors: Blue and gold

The TMU Bold women's ice hockey team (formerly the Ryerson Rams) is a U Sports university ice hockey program that represents Toronto Metropolitan University. The Bold are a member of the Ontario University Athletics (OUA) conference. They play their games at the Mattamy Athletic Centre, in Toronto, Ontario.

== History ==
=== Season-by-season Record ===
Won championship	Lost championship	Conference champions	League leader

Year	Coach	W	L	OTL	GF	GA	Pts	Finish	Conference Tournament
2019–20	Lisa Haley	14	8	2	71	52	42	5th, OUA	Appeared in OUA Semi-finals
2018–19	Lisa Haley	15	7	2	72	62	43	6th, OUA	Appeared in OUA Semi-finals
2017–18	Lisa Haley	10	7	2	63	53	42	5th, OUA	Appeared in OUA Quarterfinals
2016–17	Lisa Haley	5	13	4	44	66	23	11th, OUA	Did not qualify
2015–16	Lisa Haley	3	18	3	30	73	12	13th, OUA	Did not qualify
2014–15	Lisa Haley	13	10	1	46	53	27	7th, OUA	Appeared in OUA Quarterfinals
2013–14	Pierre Alain (interim)	5	18	1	34	71	11	13th, OUA	Did not qualify
2012–13	Lisa Haley	2	23	1	35	107	5	11th, OUA	Did not qualify
2011–12	Lisa Haley	1	23	2	35	131	4	11th, OUA	Did not qualify

=== Season team scoring champion ===
Year	Player	GP	G	A	PTS	PIM	OUA rank
2019–20	Erika Crouse	24	15	7	22	16	5th
2018–19	Brooklyn Gemmill	24	10	13	23	22	6th

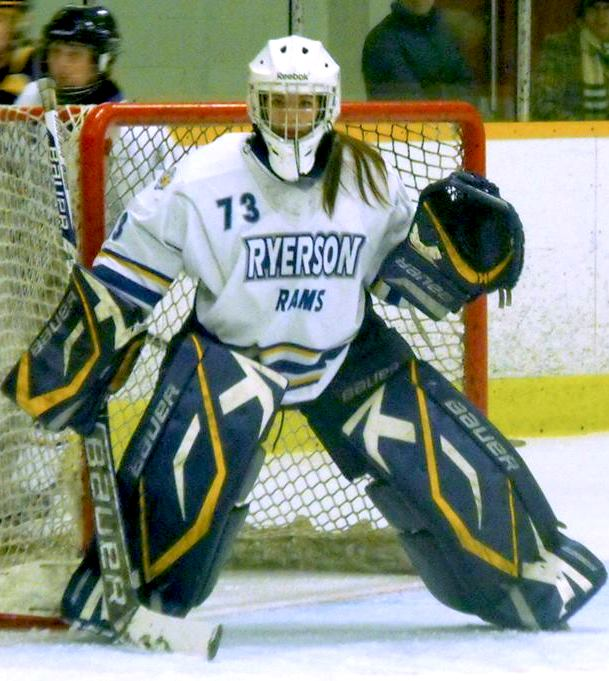
Emma Crawley was the first starting goalie for Ryerson Women's Hockey when the program joined the OUA in 2011.

== International players ==
- Ailish Forfar Canada: Ice hockey at the 2019 Winter Universiade

== Awards and honours ==
=== OUA Awards ===
- Ailish Forfar: 2017-18 OUA First-Team All-Star
- Brooklyn Gemmill, 2017-18 OUA All-Rookie Team
- Caley Davis, 2025-26 OUA East Champion of EDI (Equity, Diversity, Inclusion) Award

==== OUA All-Stars ====
First Team

- 2019-20: Erika Crouse
- 2017-18: Ailish Forfar

Second Team

- 2018-19: Kryshandra Green

==== OUA All-Rookie ====
- 2018-19: Erika Crouse
- 2017-18: Brooklyn Gemmill

=== U Sports Awards ===
- Erika Crouse: 2019 U Sports Rookie of the Year
- Ailish Forfar: 2018 Marion Hilliard Award (for Student-Athlete Community Service)

==== All-Canadian ====
- Ailish Forfar: 2017-18 U SPORTS Second-Team All-Canadian

=== Team MVP Trophy ===
- Lauren Nicholson 2019-20
- Kryshanda Green 2018-19
- Ailish Forfar 2017-18
- Ailish Forfar 2016-17
- Jessica Hartwick 2015-16
- Jessica Hartwick 2014-15
- Melissa Wronzberg 2013-14
- Stephanie Chiste 2012-13
- Kyla Thurston/Lauren McCusker 2011-12*
- Dana Carson 2010-11
- Jenny Young 2009-10

=== Ryerson awards ===
- Erika Crouse, RSU Female Rookie of the Year (2018-19)
- Teagan Gartley, Claude LaJeunesse Award - Academics (2019-20)

==== G. L. Dobson Trophy ====
- Janella Brodett, 2013-14 G. L. Dobson Trophy
- Jessica Hartwick, 2014-15 G. L. Dobson Trophy
- Ailish Forfar, 2017-18 G. L. Dobson Trophy (recognizing Female Greatest Contribution to Sport, Campus and Community Life)

== Rams in professional hockey ==
= CWHL All-Star	= NWHL All-Star	= Clarkson Cup Champion	= Isobel Cup Champion

Player	Position	Team(s)	League(s)	Years	Titles
Ailish Forfar	Forward	Markham Thunder	CWHL	1	
Jessica Hartwick	Forward	Markham Thunder	CWHL	2	2018 Clarkson Cup
Melissa Wronzberg	Forward	Markham Thunder	CWHL	2	2018 Clarkson Cup

== See also ==
- Ontario University Athletics women's ice hockey
