= 2011–12 Wisconsin Badgers women's ice hockey season =

WCHA Regular Season Champions NCAA Division I National Runner-Up NCAA Championship Game, L 4–2 vs. Minnesota
- Conference: 1st WCHA
- Home ice: Kohl Center

Rankings
- USA Today/USA Hockey Magazine: #2
- USCHO.com/CBS College Sports: #2

Record
- Overall: 33–5–2
- Home: 18–2–0
- Road: 13–1–2
- Neutral: 2–2–0

Coaches and captains
- Head coach: Mark Johnson
- Assistant coaches: Peter Johnson; Jackie Friesen
- Captain: Hillary Knight
- Alternate captain(s): Brooke Ammerman; Carolyne Prévost; Brianna Decker

The Wisconsin Badgers women's ice hockey team represented the University of Wisconsin in the 2011–12 NCAA Division I women's ice hockey season. The Badgers failed to repeat as NCAA women's Frozen Four champions.

== Offseason ==
- September 1: The Badgers women's ice hockey team will take part in the opening game festivities for the 2011 Wisconsin Badgers football team. The women's team will be at Badgerville, the official pre-game event of Wisconsin Athletics. Players will be at the event with their NCAA Frozen Four national championship trophy for photos and autographs.
- September 1: 2011 Patty Kazmaier Memorial Award winner and former Badgers player Meghan Duggan is a finalist for the 2011 Sportswoman of the Year Award, presented by the Women's Sports Foundation

=== Recruiting ===
Player	Nationality	Position	Notes
Katy Josephs	Canada	Forward	From Calgary, Alberta
Katarina Zgraja	Canada	Defense	Played for Bluevale Collegiate Institute
Blayre Turnbull	Canada	Forward	Played at Shattuck-Saint Mary's
Karley Sylvester	United States	Forward	Played high school hockey at Warroad, Minnesota

== Regular season ==
=== News and notes ===
- Sept. 20: Wisconsin head coach Mark Johnson was named one of four recipients of the 2011 Lester Patrick Trophy for outstanding service to hockey in the United States.
- September 24: Karley Sylvester was the first freshman of the campaign to net a goal.
- On September 25, 2011, Hilary Knight scored her fifth career hat trick in a 13–0 defeat of the Lindenwood Lions. In addition, Briana Decker scored her third career hat trick. The 13 goals scored by the Badgers were tied for third most in the NCAA women's ice hockey all-time list for most goals scored in a game by a team.
- Nov. 18–19: Carolyne Prevost became the 17th player in program history to record 100 career points. In a victory over RPI, she netted the first goal of the game for Wisconsin. She would also record an assist in the match. The following day, Prevost recorded six points in the finale against RPI. It was a team-high for any Wisconsin skater this season. She scored two goals, including the game winner, and helped on four other goals to establish a new career high for most points in one game.
- Nov. 19: Brianna Decker recorded her sixth career hat trick as the Badgers celebrated an 8–2 victory against RPI. In addition, she extended her point scoring streak to 24 games.
- November 25: In Wisconsin’s fifth shutout of the season, Brianna Decker and Hilary Knight netted two goals apiece in a 5–0 victory over St. Cloud State. Brianna Decker extended her point scoring streak to 26 games, a program record, while Alex Rigsby earned her 10th career shutout.
- December 10: In a WCHA contest versus Bemidji State, Hilary Knight produced four points, giving her a career total of 239. She has now surpassed Meghan Duggan’s 238 career points, to become the Wisconsin Badgers all-time leading point scorer. For her efforts, Knight was recognized as the WCHA Player of the Week.
- January 27–28: Wisconsin posted a two-game sweep of Bemidji State. In the first game, Madison Packer scored the game-winning goal in overtime as the Badgers prevailed by a 3–2 score. The following day, Hilary Knight notched her first goal since Dec. 10 with 7:38 left in the third period. Said goal would stand as the game winner on Fill the Bowl nights. A record crowd of 12,402 attended the Kohl Center. Alex Rigby made 28 saves to obtain her sixth shutout of the campaign. Her rival between the pipes, Bemidji State netminder Zuzana Tomcikova made 32 saves. Wisconsin is the only team to sweep the season series from the Beavers during the 2011–12 season. The previous record for most fans to watch a women's college hockey game at the Kohl Center was 10,668. That record was set at the Kohl Center on Jan. 29, 2011.

=== Standings ===
2011–12 Western Collegiate Hockey Association standings
	Conference								Overall					
	GP	W	L	T	SW	PTS	GF	GA	GP	W	L	T	GF	GA
#1 Wisconsin†	28	23	3	2	1	72	113	44	37	31	4	2	170	53
#2 Minnesota*	28	21	5	2	1	66	113	43	37	30	5	2	167	50
#6 North Dakota	28	16	9	3	2	53	116	75	36	22	11	3	154	89
#9 Minnesota Duluth	28	15	12	1	1	47	91	61	36	21	13	1	121	77
Ohio State	28	13	14	1	1	41	75	96	36	16	16	4	99	115
Bemidji State	28	11	15	2	0	35	70	73	37	17	17	3	101	85
St. Cloud State	28	4	24	0	0	12	32	150	36	5	29	2	37	130
Minnesota State	28	3	24	1	0	10	37	105	36	7	28	1	64	133
Championship: Minnesota † indicates conference regular season champion * indicates conference tournament champion National rankings: Conference rankings: Updated March 23, 2012

=== Schedule and results ===
- Green background indicates win (3 points).
- Yellow background indicates shootout win (2 points).
- Red background indicates loss (0 points).
- White background indicates tie (1 point).

2011–12 Schedule and Results

September: 2–0–0 (Home: 2–0–0; Road: 0–0–0)
#	Date	Visitor	Score	Home	OT	Decision	Attendance	WCHA	Overall	Box score
1†	September 23	Lindenwood	0–11	Wisconsin		Rigsby	1,417	0–0–0–0	1–0–0
2†	September 25	Lindenwood	0–13	Wisconsin		Rigsby	544	0–0–0–0	2–0–0

October: 7–1–0 (Home: 5–1–0; Road: 2–0–0)
#	Date	Visitor	Score	Home	OT	Decision	Attendance	WCHA	Overall	Box score
3	October 8	North Dakota	2–5	Wisconsin		Rigsby	2,136	1–0–0–0	3–0–0
4	October 9	North Dakota	2–3	Wisconsin	OT	Rigsby	1,971	2–0–0–0	4–0–0
5	October 14	Minnesota	2–3	Wisconsin		Rigsby	2,379	3–0–0–0	5–0–0
6	October 16	Minnesota	3–2	Wisconsin		Rigsby	2,603	3–1–0–0	5–1–0
7	October 21	Wisconsin	4–3	Minnesota Duluth		Rigsby	1,338	4–1–0–0	6–1–0
8	October 22	Wisconsin	6–3	Minnesota Duluth		Rigsby	1,409	5–1–0–0	7–1–0
9†	October 28	Boston University	0–3	Wisconsin		Rigsby	3,298	5–1–0–0	8–1–0
10†	October 29	Boston University	1–6	Wisconsin		Rigsby	2,243	5–1–0–0	9–1–0

November: 6–0–0 (Home: 2–0–0; Road: 4–0–0)
#	Date	Visitor	Score	Home	OT	Decision	Attendance	WCHA	Overall	Box score
11	November 4	Wisconsin	3–1	Ohio State		Rigsby	478	6–1–0–0	10–1–0
12	November 5	Wisconsin	2–0	Ohio State		Rigsby	311	7–1–0–0	11–1–0
13†	November 18	Wisconsin	4–3	Rensselaer		Rigsby	100	7–1–0–0	12–1–0
14†	November 19	Wisconsin	8–2	Rensselaer		Rigsby	100	7–1–0–0	13–1–0
15	November 25	St. Cloud State	0–5	Wisconsin		Rigsby	2,758	8–1–0–0	14–1–0
16	November 27	St. Cloud State	1–6	Wisconsin		Rigsby	2,615	9–1–0–0	15–1–0

December: 4–0–0 (Home: 0–0–0; Road: 4–0–0)
#	Date	Visitor	Score	Home	OT	Decision	Attendance	WCHA	Overall	Box score
17	December 2	Wisconsin	4–0	Minnesota State		Rigsby	102	10–1–0–0	16–1–0
18	December 3	Wisconsin	5–1	Minnesota State		Rigsby	99	11–1–0–0	17–1–0
19	December 9	Wisconsin	3–1	Bemidji State		Rigsby	234	12–1–0–0	18–1–0
20	December 10	Wisconsin	3–1	Bemidji State		Rigsby	329	13–1–0–0	19–1–0

January: 5–1–2 (Home: 4–0–0; Road: 1–1–2)
#	Date	Visitor	Score	Home	OT	Decision	Attendance	WCHA	Overall	Box score
21	January 6	Wisconsin	3–3	Minnesota	OT	Rigsby	2,554	13–1–1–1	19–1–1
22	January 7	Wisconsin	0–1	Minnesota		Rigsby	2,666	13–2–1–1	19–2–1
23	January 14	Wisconsin	8–2	North Dakota		Rigsby	1,621	14–2–1–1	20–2–1
24	January 15	Wisconsin	4–4	North Dakota	OT	Rigsby	899	14–2–2–1	20–2–2
25	January 20	Minnesota Duluth	0–2	Wisconsin		Rigsby	1,924	15–2–2–1	21–2–2
26	January 21	Minnesota Duluth	3–4	Wisconsin	OT	Rigsby	3,694	16–2–2–1	22–2–2
27	January 27	Bemidji State	2–3	Wisconsin	OT	Rigsby	2,690	17–2–2–1	23–2–2
28	January 28	Bemidji State	0–1	Wisconsin		Rigsby	12,402	18–2–2–1	24–2–2

February: 7–1–0 (Home: 5–1–0; Road: 2–0–0)
#	Date	Visitor	Score	Home	OT	Decision	Attendance	WCHA	Overall	Box score
29	February 3	Minnesota State	2–5	Wisconsin		Rigsby	2,047	19–2–2–1	25–2–2
30	February 5	Minnesota State	0–6	Wisconsin		Rigsby	2,695	20–2–2–1	26–2–2
31	February 10	Wisconsin	5–0	St. Cloud State		Rigsby	253	21–2–2–1	27–2–2
32	February 11	Wisconsin	6–2	St. Cloud State		Rigsby	399	22–2–2–1	28–2–2
33	February 17	Ohio State	1–7	Wisconsin		Rigsby	2,157	23–2–2–1	29–2–2
34	February 18	Ohio State	4–2	Wisconsin		Rigsby	3,576	23–3–2–1	29–3–2
35†‡	February 24	Minnesota State	0–7	Wisconsin		Rigsby	804	23–3–2–1	30–3–2
36†‡	February 25	Minnesota State	0–4	Wisconsin		Rigsby	824	23–3–2–1	31–3–2

March: 0–0–0 (Home: 0–0–0; Road: 0–0–0; Neutral: 2–2–0)
#	Date	Visitor	Score	Home	OT	Decision	Attendance	WCHA	Overall	Box score
37†°	March 2	Minnesota Duluth	3–1	Wisconsin		Rigsby	1,057	23–3–2–1	31–4–2
38†¤	March 10	Mercyhurst	1–3	Wisconsin		Rigsby	2,946	23–3–2–1	32–4–2
39†¥	March 16	Boston College	2–6	Wisconsin		Rigsby	1,388	23–3–2–1	33–4–2
40†§	March 18	Minnesota	4–2	Wisconsin		Rigsby	2,439	23–3–2–1	33–5–2

† Non-conference game ‡ 2012 WCHA Women's Ice Hockey Tournament first round game ° 2012 WCHA Women's Ice Hockey Tournament semifinal game
¤ 2012 NCAA Quarterfinal game ¥ 2012 NCAA Semifinal game § 2012 NCAA Championship game

== Home attendance ==
Wisconsin led all NCAA Division I women's ice hockey programs in both average and total home attendance, averaging 2,689 spectators and totaling 56,471 spectators. It was the program's sixth consecutive season leading in these attendance metrics.

The 12,402 spectators at the January 28 home game against Bemidji State set a new (since surpassed) record for single-game attendance attendance in NCAA Division I women's ice hockey, surpassing the previous record of 10,668 spectators that had been set the previous season by Wisconsin's January 29, 2011 home game against Minnesota.

== Awards and honors ==
- Brooke Ammerman, WCHA Co-Offensive Player of the Week (Week of February 22, 2012)
- Brianna Decker, 2012 Patty Kazmaier Memorial Award
- Katy Josephs, WCHA Rookie of the Week (Week of November 28, 2011)
- Hilary Knight, WCHA Player of the Week (Week of December 14, 2011)
- Carolyne Prevost, WCHA Co-Offensive Player of the Week (Week of November 21, 2011)
- Carolyne Prevost, WCHA Player of the Week (Week of January 17, 2012)
- Alex Rigsby, WCHA Defensive Player of the Week (Week of October 18, 2011)
- Alex Rigsby, WCHA Defensive Player of the Week (Week of October 25, 2011)
- Alex Rigsby, WCHA Defensive Player of the Week (Week of February 1, 2012)
- Blayre Turnbull, WCHA Rookie of the Week (Week of October 5, 2011)

== See also ==
- 2011-12 Wisconsin Badgers men's ice hockey season
