= Lisa Haley (ice hockey) =

Canadian ice hockey coach

Current position
- Title: Head coach
- Team: TMU Bold; Hungarian women's national team

Biographical details
- Born: 28 June 1973 (age 53); Westville, Nova Scotia, Canada

Coaching career (HC unless noted)
- 1997–2011: Saint Mary's Huskies
- 2005–06: Canadian national U22 team
- 2007–08: Canadian national team (assistant)
- 2009–10: Canadian national U18 team (assistant)
- 2010–2014: Canadian national team (assistant)
- 2011–: Ryerson Rams
- 2015–16: Canadian national U18 team
- 2021: Toronto Six (assistant)
- 2020–: Hungarian national team

Accomplishments and honors

Awards
- CIS Coach of the Year (2003); AUS Coach of the Year (2002, 2003)
Medal record
Women's ice hockey
Representing Canada
Olympic Games
Gold medal – first place	2014 Sochi	as assistant coach
World Championship
Gold medal – first place	2012 United States	as assistant coach
Silver medal – second place	2008 China	as assistant coach
Silver medal – second place	2011 Switzerland	as assistant coach
Silver medal – second place	2013 Canada	as assistant coach
World U18 Championship
Gold medal – first place	2010 United States	as assistant coach
Silver medal – second place	2016 Canada	as head coach
Four Nations Cup
Gold medal – first place	2007 Sweden	as assistant coach

Lisa Haley (née Jordan, previously MacDonald; born 28 June 1973) is a Canadian ice hockey coach, currently serving as head coach of the TMU Bold women's ice hockey team and the Hungarian women's national team. She is an assistant coach for the Toronto Six of the National Women's Hockey League (NWHL). In 2021, she was also named the senior vice president of hockey operations for the NWHL.

Originally from Westville, Nova Scotia in Pictou County, among her achievements as a coach, she was part of the coaching staff for the Canadian national women's team that won the gold medal at the 2014 Sochi Winter Games. During the 2015–16 season, she served as the head coach for the Canada women's national under-18 ice hockey team, capturing a silver medal at the 2016 IIHF U18 Women's World Championship. Prior to the appointment, she captured gold as an assistant coach with Canada's National Women's Development Team at the 2015 Nations Cup.

== Coaching career ==
=== International ===
With Canada's national women's ice hockey team, she has served as an assistant coach in 2007, winning gold at the Four Nations Cup, along with stints in 2008 and from 2011–2014. Haley has also worked with Canada's Under-18 national women's team and its Under-22/Development Program. Her first assignment with Hockey Canada involved the U22/Development Team. Serving as the head coach during the 2005–06 season, she led the team to a gold medal in the Air Canada Cup (now known as the Nations Cup). With the U18 team, she served as an assistant coach for Canada's gold medal entry at the 2010 IIHF U18 Worlds, the first gold in the history of the Canadian U18 program. She would return to the program in 2016 as the head coach, which included Gina Kingsbury on her coaching staff.

In July 2016, Haley was one of 26 Canadians (players, instructors and coaches) that participated at the 2016 IIHF High Performance Women's Hockey Camp in Vierumäki, Finland. Serving as the head coach of Team White, Mackenna Parker was the only Canadian-born player on the roster. Four-time Winter Games participant Jenny Potter served as the athlete ambassador while Emelie Berggren and Cindy Debuquet were among members of Haley's coaching staff.

=== CIS ===
In 1997, Haley was appointed as the head coach at Saint Mary's University in Nova Scotia. During her time as coach, Haley recorded 118 wins, compared to 52 losses and 11 ties, posting a .682 winning percentage. The Huskies made eight appearances in the Atlantic University Sport (AUS) finals with Haley as head coach, winning on four occasions (1998, 2003, 2004 and 2010). Of note, Haley and the Huskies qualified four times for the Canadian Interuniversity Sport (CIS) national championship tournament. Honored as the CIS coach of the year in 2003, she would also capture the AUS coach of the year award twice.

Currently the head coach of the Ryerson Rams women ice hockey program, which competes in Canadian Interuniversity Sport, she was appointed to the position on April 1, 2011. Under Haley's tutelage, the Rams would capture their first Ontario University Athletics (OUA) conference victory on October 15, 2011, in a 1-0 final against the Waterloo Warriors. The first head coach in program history, she has held the position in every season since the inaugural puck drop, except in 2013–14, when she was in a full-time capacity with the Canadian national women's team competing at the Sochi Winter Games. During that season, Pierre Alain, who has also served in coaching capacities with Hockey Canada, served as the Rams head coach. Returning to the Rams in 2014 (Alain would become head coach with the Carleton Ravens), Haley would lead the club to its first postseason appearance in the spring of 2015.

=== NWHL ===
For the 2020-21 season, Haley served on Digit Murphy's coaching staff for the Toronto Six, an expansion team of the NWHL. Following the Isobel Cup Finals, Haley was appointed as the league's vice-president of hockey operations.

== Awards and honors ==
- Canadian Interuniversity Sport Coach of the Year – 2003
- Atlantic University Sport Coach of the Year – 2002, 2003
