= 2011–12 North Dakota Fighting Sioux women's ice hockey season =

- Conference: WCHA

Rankings
- USA Today/USA Hockey Magazine: 6
- USCHO.com/CBS College Sports: 6

Record

Coaches and captains
- Head coach: Brian Idalski
- Assistant coaches: Peter Elander

The North Dakota Fighting Sioux women's ice hockey team represented the University of North Dakota in the WCHA women's ice hockey conference. The team attempted to qualify for the NCAA Frozen Four for the first time.

== Offseason ==
=== Recruiting ===
Player	Position	Nationality	Notes
Shelby Amsley-Benzie	Goaltender	United States	Warroad High School team captain in 2009–10 and 2010–11
Andrea Dalen	Forward	Norway	Has participated in two IIHF World Championships (Division I in 2009 and 2011)
Shannon Kaiser	Forward	United States	Minnesota Associated Press all-state honorable mention (2010–11)
Tori Williams	Defense	Canada	Balmoral Hall Varsity Athlete of the Year (2011); Played with gold medal winning Team Manitoba at the National Aboriginal Hockey Championships in 2009–10
Leah Jensen	Forward	United States	Holds East Grand Forks High School record for most goals in a season with 53
Layla Marvin	Forward	United States	Cousin of Olympic silver medalist Gigi Marvin
Michelle Bonapace-Potvin	Goaltender	Canada	Redshirt freshman
Josie Johnson	Forward	United States	Named Miss Hockey Wisconsin (2011) and winner of the Molly Engstrom Top Defenseman Award in 2011
Josefine Jakobsen	Forward	Denmark	She played in three IIHF World Championships (Division II in 2008–09 and 2011); Won Directorate Award Best Forward at 2011 World Championship (Division II)

== Exhibition ==
- September 24: Freshman Josefine Jakobsen recorded a hat-trick as the Fighting Sioux defeated the Manitoba Bisons women's ice hockey program by a 10–0 tally. Of note, the European skaters combined for 11 points in the game. Michelle Karvinen had four points, while freshman Andrea Dalen had three points.

Date	CIS school	Score	ND goal scorers
Sept. 23	Manitoba	ND, 11–0	Sara Dagenais, Mary Loken, Alyssa Wiebe (2), Monique Weber, Jocelyne Lamoureux (2), Andrea Dalen, Allison Parizek, Monique Weber, Ashley Holmes
Sept. 24	Manitoba	ND, 10–0	Alyssa Wiebe, Jocelyne Lamoureux (2), Josefine Jacobsen (3), Monique Lamoureux, Monique Weber, Andrea Dalen, Michelle Karvinen

== Regular season ==
- October 15–16: Michelle Karvinen produced five points, and earned a +5 plus/minus rating as the Fighting Sioux swept the Vermont Catamounts. In a 9–1 win on October 15, 2011, Karvinen scored two goals and set up another for a three-point performance. She assisted on Jocelyne Lamoureux's game-winning goal at 2:58 of the first period. The following day, she accumulated two more assists in a 4–1 triumph. For the second consecutive game, she assisted on the game-winning goal, as Monique Lamoureux scored at 15:11 of the second period.
- October 21: In its WCHA home opener, the top line of the Fighting Sioux combined for thirteen points as they bested the Ohio State Buckeyes by an 11–1 margin. Monique Lamoureux-Kolls tied a North Dakota record with a five-point game. In the contest, 13 different Sioux skaters registered at least one point. Michelle Karvinen scored a hat trick and logged one assist for four points. In addition, Josefine Jakobsen and Jocelyne Lamoureux each had four-point games. Several program records were broken in the game including: most goals scored in a game (11), largest margin of victory (10), and largest margin of victory over a conference opponent (10).

=== Jocelyne Lamoureux ===
As a 2012 Patty Kazmaier Award finalist, Lamoureux was the NCAA scoring champion with 82 points. She also led the NCAA in two other statistical categories: points per game (2.34) and assists (48). All three benchmarks are new Fighting Sioux records. In WCHA conference play, Lamoureux led all skaters in points (64), goals (27) and assists (37). Lamoureux was named to the 2012 All-WCHA First Team, while also being recognized as the WCHA Student-Athlete of the Year Award winner. In addition to being recognized as an American Hockey Coaches Association (AHCA) All-American First Team selection, she was also named to the 2012 Capital One Academic All-America Team. Lamoureux became North Dakota's 75 Academic All-American, and the first ever from the women's hockey program.

=== Standings ===
2011–12 Western Collegiate Hockey Association standings
	Conference								Overall					
	GP	W	L	T	SW	PTS	GF	GA	GP	W	L	T	GF	GA
#1 Wisconsin†	28	23	3	2	1	72	113	44	37	31	4	2	170	53
#2 Minnesota*	28	21	5	2	1	66	113	43	37	30	5	2	167	50
#6 North Dakota	28	16	9	3	2	53	116	75	36	22	11	3	154	89
#9 Minnesota Duluth	28	15	12	1	1	47	91	61	36	21	13	1	121	77
Ohio State	28	13	14	1	1	41	75	96	36	16	16	4	99	115
Bemidji State	28	11	15	2	0	35	70	73	37	17	17	3	101	85
St. Cloud State	28	4	24	0	0	12	32	150	36	5	29	2	37	130
Minnesota State	28	3	24	1	0	10	37	105	36	7	28	1	64	133
Championship: Minnesota † indicates conference regular season champion * indicates conference tournament champion National rankings: Conference rankings: Updated March 23, 2012

=== Schedule ===
- Green background indicates regulation or overtime win.
- Red background indicates regulation or overtime loss.
- White background indicates tie or overtime tie.

#	Date	Visitor	Score	Home	OT	Decision	Attendance	WCHA	Overall	Notes
(EX)	September 23	University of Manitoba	0–11	#7 North Dakota		Ney	673	0–0–0	0–0–0
(EX)	September 24	University of Manitoba	0–10	#7 North Dakota		Dagfinrud	628	0–0–0	0–0–0
1†	September 30	#7 North Dakota	1–4	#2 Boston University		Ney	602	0–0–0	0–1–0
2†	October 1	#7 North Dakota	5–1	#2 Boston University		Ney	165	0–0–0	1–1–0
3	October 8	#6 North Dakota	2–5	#1 Wisconsin		Ney	2,136	0–1–0–0	1–2–0
4	October 9	#6 North Dakota	2–3	#1 Wisconsin	OT	Ney	1,971	0–2–0–0	1–3–0
5†	October 15	Vermont	1–9	#7 North Dakota		Ney	2,203	0–2–0–0	2–3–0
6†	October 16	Vermont	1–4	#7 North Dakota		Dagfinrud	2,097	0–2–0–0	3–3–0
7	October 21	Ohio State	1–11	#7 North Dakota		Ney	3,010	1–2–0–0	4–3–0
8	October 22	Ohio State	1–7	#7 North Dakota		Ney	3,058	2–2–0–0	5–3–0
9	October 29	#6 North Dakota	1–6	#7 Minnesota–Duluth		Ney	851	2–3–0–0	5–4–0
10	October 30	#6 North Dakota	2–2	#7 Minnesota–Duluth	OT	Ney	884	2–3–1–0	5–4–1
11	November 4	#7 North Dakota	6–2	St. Cloud State		Ney	212	3–3–1–0	6–4–1
12	November 5	#7 North Dakota	5–1	St. Cloud State		Dagfinrud	239	4–3–1–0	7–4–1
13	November 18	Minnesota State	3–5	#7 North Dakota		Ney	2,228	5–3–1–0	8–4–1
14	November 19	Minnesota State	1–6	#7 North Dakota		Ney	1,066	6–3–1–0	9–4–1
15	November 25	#6 North Dakota	5–2	Bemidji State		Ney	1,300	7–3–1–0	10–4–1	Crookston, MN
16	November 26	#6 North Dakota	2–3	Bemidji State		Dagfinrud	402	7–4–1–0	10–5–1
17	December 2	#2 Minnesota	7–2	#5 North Dakota		Ney	2,484	7–5–1–0	10–6–1
18	December 3	#2 Minnesota	0–3	#5 North Dakota		Dagfinrud	1,617	8–5–1–0	11–6–1
19	December 10	#10 Minnesota–Duluth	2–0	#5 North Dakota		Dagfinrud	667	9–5–1–0	12–6–1
20	December 11	#10 Minnesota–Duluth	1–5	#5 North Dakota		Dagfinrud	597	9–6–1–0	12–7–1
21(NC)	January 4	Lindenwood	0–14	#6 North Dakota		Ney	348	9–6–1–0	13–7–1
22	January 14	#1 Wisconsin	8–2	#6 North Dakota		Ney	1621	9–7–1–0	13–8–1
23	January 15	#1 Wisconsin	4–4	#6 North Dakota	SHO	Dagfinrud	899	9–7–2–1	13–8–2	North Dakota wins shootout 2–1
24	January 20	St. Cloud State	0–10	#6 North Dakota		Dagfinrud	808	10–7–2–1	14–8–2
25	January 21	St. Cloud State	0–9	#6 North Dakota		Dagfinrud	939	11–7–2–1	15–8–2
26	January 27	#5 North Dakota	2–6	Ohio State		Dagfinrud	324	11–8–2–1	15–9–2
27	January 28	#5 North Dakota	5–2	Ohio State		Ney	391	12–8–2–1	16–9–2
28	February 3	Bemidji State	2–5	#6 North Dakota		Ney	1,246	13–8–2–1	17–9–2
29	February 4	Bemidji State	1–3	#6 North Dakota		Ney	1,506	14–8–2–1	18–9–2
30	February 10	#4 North Dakota	7–1	Minnesota State		Ney	151	15–8–2–1	19–9–2
31	February 11	#4 North Dakota	3–3	Minnesota State	OT	Ney	289	15–8–3–2	19–9–3	North Dakota wins shoot out 4–3
32	February 17	#5 North Dakota	2–1	#2 Minnesota	OT	Ney	1,925	16–8–3–2	20–9–3
33	February 18	#5 North Dakota	2–5	#2 Minnesota		Ney	2,157	16–9–3–2	20–10–3
34	February 24	Bemidji State	1–3	#5 North Dakota		Ney	764	16–9–3–2	21–10–3	WCHA First Round, Ralph Engelstad Arena, Grand Forks, ND
35	February 25	Bemidji State	0–2	#5 North Dakota		Ney	1,060	16–9–3–2	22–10–3	WCHA First Round, Ralph Engelstad Arena, Grand Forks, ND
36	March 2	#5 North Dakota	0–6	#2 Minnesota		Ney	1,147	16–9–3–2	22–11–3	WCHA Final Faceoff Semi-Final #1, AMSOIL Arena, Duluth, MN
37	March 10	#6 North Dakota	1–5	#2 Minnesota		Dagfinrud	1,630	16–9–3–2	22–12–3	NCAA Quarterfinals, Ridder Arena, Minneapolis, MN

Notes: (EX) Denotes an exhibition game.

† Denotes a non-conference game.

== Awards and honors ==
- Jorid Dagfinrud, WCHA Defensive Player of the Week (Week of January 23, 2012
- Josefine Jakobsen, WCHA Defensive Player of the Week (Week of February 1, 2012)
- Josefine Jakobsen, WCHA Rookie of the Week (Week of February 22, 2012)
- Jocelyne Lamoureux, WCHA Player of the Week (Week of November 8, 2011)
- Jocelyne Lamoureux, WCHA Player of the Week (Week of January 23, 2012)
- Jocelyne Lamoureux, Finalist, 2012 Patty Kazmaier Award
- Jocelyne Lamoureux, NCAA scoring champion
- Jocelyne Lamoureux, WCHA scoring champion
- Jocelyne Lamoureux, UND's 2011–12 Grace Rhonemus Female Athlete of the Year Award
- Jocelyne Lamoureux, 2012 Capital One Academic All-American
- Monique Lamoureux, WCHA Player of the Week (Week of October 25, 2011)
- Monique Lamoureux, WCHA Defensive Player of the Week (Week of February 8, 2012)
- Michelle Karvinen, WCHA Rookie of the Week (Week of October 18, 2011)
- Michelle Karvinen, WCHA Rookie of the Week (Week of October 25, 2011)
- Michelle Karvinen, WCHA Rookie of the Week (Week of November 8, 2011)
- Michelle Karvinen, WCHA Rookie of the Week (Week of February 8, 2012)
- Candice Molle, WCHA Defensive Player of the Week (Week of November 21, 2011)
