= 2011–12 St. Cloud State Huskies women's ice hockey season =

- Conference: WCHA

Rankings
- USA Today/USA Hockey Magazine: Not ranked
- USCHO.com/CBS College Sports: Not ranked

Record

Coaches and captains
- Captain: Jocelyn Zabrick
- Alternate captain(s): Brittany Toor, Alex Nelson

== Offseason ==
- May 2 The Huskies named Jocelyn Zabrick, a junior player, as the team captain for the season. Brittany Toor and forward Alex Nelson were appointed alternate captains.

== Regular season ==
=== Standings ===
2011–12 Western Collegiate Hockey Association standings
	Conference								Overall					
	GP	W	L	T	SW	PTS	GF	GA	GP	W	L	T	GF	GA
#1 Wisconsin†	28	23	3	2	1	72	113	44	37	31	4	2	170	53
#2 Minnesota*	28	21	5	2	1	66	113	43	37	30	5	2	167	50
#6 North Dakota	28	16	9	3	2	53	116	75	36	22	11	3	154	89
#9 Minnesota Duluth	28	15	12	1	1	47	91	61	36	21	13	1	121	77
Ohio State	28	13	14	1	1	41	75	96	36	16	16	4	99	115
Bemidji State	28	11	15	2	0	35	70	73	37	17	17	3	101	85
St. Cloud State	28	4	24	0	0	12	32	150	36	5	29	2	37	130
Minnesota State	28	3	24	1	0	10	37	105	36	7	28	1	64	133
Championship: Minnesota † indicates conference regular season champion * indicates conference tournament champion National rankings: Conference rankings: Updated March 23, 2012

== Awards and honors ==
- Julie Friend, WCHA Rookie of the Week (Week of December 14, 2011)
- Julie Friend, WCHA Defensive Player of the Week (Week of January 17, 2012)
