= 2011–12 Minnesota Duluth Bulldogs women's ice hockey season =

- Conference: WCHA
- Home ice: AMSOIL Arena

Rankings
- USA Today/USA Hockey Magazine: #9
- USCHO.com/CBS College Sports: #9

Record

Coaches and captains
- Head coach: Shannon Miller
- Assistant coaches: Laura Schuler; Steve MacDonald; Brant Nicklin
- Captain(s): Haley Irwin and Kacy Ambroz
- Alternate captain(s): Jennifer Harss and Lana Steck

The Minnesota Duluth Bulldogs women's hockey team represented the University of Minnesota Duluth in the 2011–12 NCAA Division I women's ice hockey season. The Bulldogs attempted to win their sixth NCAA women's Frozen Four championship. The school hosted two postseason events: the 2012 NCAA Frozen Four Championship, and the 2011 WCHA's Final Face-Off, both at AMSOIL Arena. Of note, head coach Miller was chair of the Ethics Committee for US women's college hockey. In addition, she was a member of the NCAA Division 1 Championships Committee, one of only two coaches in the entire country to serve on both committees.

== Offseason ==
=== News and notes ===
- May 12: Winnipeg, Manitoba native Steve MacDonald replaces Maria Rooth as an assistant coach on the Bulldogs. MacDonald served as the Balmoral Hall School Director of Hockey and Varsity Prep head coach and was also in Hockey Canada’s national team coaching pool.
- June 8: Two members of the Swedish national team will join the Bulldogs for the 2011-12 season. Tina Enstrom and Erika Grahm both played for Sweden at the 2010 Winter Games in Vancouver.
- June 16: Shannon Miller has been named the coaching mentor for the Russian Senior National Team as part of the IIHF Mentorship Program. This new initiative will begin on July 1, 2011 and Miller’ mentorship will assist the Russian team in preparation for the 2014 Winter Olympics in Sochi, Russia.
- July 30: Bulldogs assistant coach Laura Schuler has been named the head coach for the Canadian National Under-22 training camp. Said camp will be held August 7–16 at the Canadian International Hockey Academy in Rockland, Ontario.
- September 7: Senior forwards Haley Irwin and Kacy Ambroz have been appointed team captains for the upcoming season. Goaltenders Jennifer Harss and Lana Steck will both be assistant captains.

=== Recruiting ===
In April 2010, Bridgette Lacquette and Jenna McParland were part of the Canadian Under 18 squad that captured gold at the IIHF Under-18 World Championships. In the first game of the tournament (on March 27), Lacquette had three points in a 6-3 win over Russia. As a member of the gold medal winning squad, both players were featured on hockey cards in the Upper Deck 2010 World of Sports card series. In addition, both players participated in the Canada Celebrates Event on June 30 in Edmonton, Alberta which recognized the Canadian Olympic and World hockey champions from the 2009-10 season.

Player	Nationality	Position	Notes
Tina Enstrom	Sweden	Forward	Enstrom has made 89 appearances for Sweden, including the 2010 Vancouver Winter Games. She was a World Championship bronze medalist in 2007
Erika Grahm	Sweden	Forward	Grahm led Sweden with five points at the 2008 Women's World Championship
Zoe Hickel	United States		Played for the Under 18 USA team
Bridgette Lacquette	Canada		Played for the Under 18 Canadian team
Jenna McParland	Canada		Played for the Under 18 Canadian team
Tea Villia	Finland		

== Exhibition ==
Date	Opponent	Location	Time	Score
9/30/2011	Minnesota Whitecaps	Duluth, MN	7:07 pm	
10/1/2011	Minnesota Whitecaps	Duluth, MN	3:07 pm	

== Regular season ==
- February 18: In a 7-1 victory over MSU-Mankato, Haley Irwin netted the 200th point of her NCAA career. She became the sixth-ever Bulldog to score 200 career points as she registered a power play goal in the first period.

=== Standings ===
2011–12 Western Collegiate Hockey Association standings
	Conference								Overall					
	GP	W	L	T	SW	PTS	GF	GA	GP	W	L	T	GF	GA
#1 Wisconsin†	28	23	3	2	1	72	113	44	37	31	4	2	170	53
#2 Minnesota*	28	21	5	2	1	66	113	43	37	30	5	2	167	50
#6 North Dakota	28	16	9	3	2	53	116	75	36	22	11	3	154	89
#9 Minnesota Duluth	28	15	12	1	1	47	91	61	36	21	13	1	121	77
Ohio State	28	13	14	1	1	41	75	96	36	16	16	4	99	115
Bemidji State	28	11	15	2	0	35	70	73	37	17	17	3	101	85
St. Cloud State	28	4	24	0	0	12	32	150	36	5	29	2	37	130
Minnesota State	28	3	24	1	0	10	37	105	36	7	28	1	64	133
Championship: Minnesota † indicates conference regular season champion * indicates conference tournament champion National rankings: Conference rankings: Updated March 23, 2012

== Awards and honors ==
- Haley Irwin, WCHA Player of the Week (Week of December 7, 2011)
- Haley Irwin, WCHA Co- Player of the Week (Week of February 22, 2012)
- Jenna McParland, WCHA Player of the Week (Week of December 7, 2011)
- Jenna McParland, WCHA Rookie of the Week (Week of January 17, 2012)
- Katherine Wilson, WCHA Player of the Week (Week of November 1, 2011)
