= 2011–12 Bemidji State Beavers women's ice hockey season =

- Conference: 6 WCHA

Rankings
- USA Today/USA Hockey Magazine: Not ranked
- USCHO.com/CBS College Sports: Not ranked

Record
- Overall: 17–17–3

Coaches and captains
- Head coach: Steve Sertich
- Assistant coaches: Amber Fryklund; Shane Venkeer; Cassie Hanson
- Captain: Montana Vichorek

The Bemidji State Beavers represented Bemidji State University in WCHA women's ice hockey. The Beavers attempted to qualify for the NCAA tournament for the first time in school history, but failed.

== Offseason ==
- August 8, 2011: Beavers player Montana Vichorek was one of 79 invited players that participated in the 2011 USA Women's Hockey National Festival.

=== Recruiting ===
| Player | Nationality | Position | Notes |
| Alex Citrowske | United States | Forward | Member of Prior Lake varsity hockey |
| Kristin Huber | Canada | Forward | She represented British Columbia in the 2011 Canada Winter Games |
| Whitney Wivoda | United States | Forward | She played six years of hockey with the Alaska Icebreakers girls’ hockey program |
| Rachael Kelly | United States | Forward | Played at Rosemount High School |
| Jenessa Philipczyk | United States | Forward | Competed with Minnesota Thoroughbreds |
| Kayleigh Chapman | Canada | Goaltender | Won the 2009 Esso Cup with the Westman Wildcats and had 2 points In 2010–11, participated at Warner Hockey School in JWHL |
| Natasha Kostenko | Canada | Forward | Represented Manitoba at the 2011 Canada Winter Games; Played for the Notre Dame College Hounds of the SFMAAAHL |
| Tegan Rose | Canada | Defense | Played for the now defunct Edmonton Chimos of the WWHL; Won the 2010 Mac's Tournament with the AAA Midget Team Alberta squad |

== Exhibition ==
| Date | Opponent | Result |
| 9/23/2011 | Thunder Bay Queens | Win, 10–3 |

== Regular season ==
- November 25–26: Erika Wheelhouse logged four points in a two-game conference series split with nationally ranked North Dakota. She scored one goal and notched an assist on November 25. The game was called The Wheelhouse Homecoming as it was being played in her hometown of Crookston, Minnesota. She assisted on her sister Marlee's second period power-play goal to give the Beavers a 1–0 lead. Later in the game, she would score to tie the game at 2 apiece. Despite eventually losing by a 5–2 mark, the two power play goals for the Beavers were their 22nd and 23rd this season, which leads the NCAA. The November 26 match was contested at the Sanford Center in Bemidji and Wheelhouse assisted on two first period goals. The Beavers would hold on for a 3–2 victory. With the four point performance in the series, Wheelhouse is tied for the scoring lead among WCHA defenders with 19 points.
- On January 28, 2012, Wisconsin hosted a record crowd of 12,402 attended the Kohl Center as the Badgers swept the Bemidji State Beavers. Alex Rigby made 28 saves to obtain her sixth shutout of the campaign. Her rival between the pipes, Bemidji State netminder Zuzana Tomcikova made 32 saves.

=== Standings ===
2011–12 Western Collegiate Hockey Association standings
| | Conference | | | | | | | | Overall | | | | | |
| | GP | W | L | T | SW | PTS | GF | GA | GP | W | L | T | GF | GA |
|---|---|---|---|---|---|---|---|---|---|---|---|---|---|---|
| #1 Wisconsin† | 28 | 23 | 3 | 2 | 1 | 72 | 113 | 44 | 37 | 31 | 4 | 2 | 170 | 53 |
| #2 Minnesota* | 28 | 21 | 5 | 2 | 1 | 66 | 113 | 43 | 37 | 30 | 5 | 2 | 167 | 50 |
| #6 North Dakota | 28 | 16 | 9 | 3 | 2 | 53 | 116 | 75 | 36 | 22 | 11 | 3 | 154 | 89 |
| #9 Minnesota Duluth | 28 | 15 | 12 | 1 | 1 | 47 | 91 | 61 | 36 | 21 | 13 | 1 | 121 | 77 |
| Ohio State | 28 | 13 | 14 | 1 | 1 | 41 | 75 | 96 | 36 | 16 | 16 | 4 | 99 | 115 |
| Bemidji State | 28 | 11 | 15 | 2 | 0 | 35 | 70 | 73 | 37 | 17 | 17 | 3 | 101 | 85 |
| St. Cloud State | 28 | 4 | 24 | 0 | 0 | 12 | 32 | 150 | 36 | 5 | 29 | 2 | 37 | 130 |
| Minnesota State | 28 | 3 | 24 | 1 | 0 | 10 | 37 | 105 | 36 | 7 | 28 | 1 | 64 | 133 |
Championship: Minnesota † indicates conference regular season champion * indicates conference tournament champion National rankings: Conference rankings: Updated March 23, 2012

=== Schedule ===
| Date | Opponent | Result | Record | Conference Record |
| 9/30/2011 | Providence | 0–0 | 0–0–1 | 0-0-0 |
| 10/1/2011 | Providence | 3–1 | 1–0–1 | 0-0-0 |
| 10/7/2011 | Ohio State | 4–4 (Shootout loss) | 1–0–2 | 0–0–1 |
| 10/8/2011 | Ohio State | 3–5 | 1–1–2 | 0–1–1 |
| 10/14/2011 | Maine | 3–2 OT | 2–1–2 | 0–1–1 |
| 10/15/2011 | Maine | 7–0 | 3–1–2 | 0–1–1 |
| 10/21/2011 | St. Cloud State | 8–1 | 4–1–2 | 1–1–1 |
| 10/22/2011 | St. Cloud State | 5–2 | 5–1–2 | 2–1–1 |
| 10/28/2011 | Minnesota | 1–4 | 5–2–2 | 2–2–1 |

==== Conference record ====
| WCHA school | Record |
| Minnesota | 0–1–0 |
| Minnesota State | |
| Minnesota Duluth | |
| North Dakota | |
| Ohio State | 0–1–1 |
| St. Cloud State | 2–0–0 |
| Wisconsin | |

== Player stats ==
| Player | GP | G | A | PTS | +/- | PIM |
| Lundquist, Sadie | 9 | 5 | 10 | 15 | +5 | 2 |
| Erickson, Emily | 9 | 6 | 8 | 14 | +5 | 4 |
| Vichorek, Montana | 9 | 4 | 10 | 14 | +1 | 6 |
| Wheelhouse, Erika | 9 | 3 | 6 | 9 | +8 | 2 |
| Wheelhouse, Marlee | 9 | 3 | 5 | 8 | 0 | 4 |
| Dusik, Tess | 9 | 4 | 3 | 7 | +2 | 10 |
| Kelly, Rachael | 9 | 3 | 2 | 5 | 0 | 9 |
| Williams, Abby | 9 | 1 | 4 | 5 | +2 | 0 |
| Williams, Lauren | 9 | 2 | 1 | 3 | 0 | 9 |

== Awards and honors ==
- Rachael Kelly, WCHA Rookie of the Week (Week of November 1, 2011)
- Montana Vichorek, Beaver Pride Female Athlete of the Week (Week of October 24, 2011)
- Montana Vichorek, WCHA Defensive Player of the Week (Week of February 22, 2012)
- Erika Wheelhouse, WCHA Defensive Player of the Week (Week of October 11, 2011)
- Zuzana Tomcikova, WCHA Defensive Player of the Week (Week of October 4, 2011)
- Zuzana Tomcikova, 2011–12 CCM Hockey Women's Division I All-American: Second Team
