= 2011–12 Minnesota State–Mankato Mavericks women's ice hockey season =

2011–12 Minnesota State University, Mankato women's ice hockey season
- Conference: WCHA

Rankings
- USA Today/USA Hockey Magazine: Not ranked
- USCHO.com/CBS College Sports: Not ranked

Record

Coaches and captains
- Head coach: Eric Means
- Assistant coaches: Jon Austin; Shari Dickerman; Dean Williamson

The Minnesota State Mavericks women's ice hockey team represented Minnesota State University, Mankato in the 2011–12 NCAA Division I women's ice hockey season.

== Offseason ==
=== Recruiting ===
| Player | Position | Nationality | Notes |
| Erin Krichiver | Goaltender | United States | Played at Shattuck St. Mary's |
| Shelby Moteyunas | Defense | United States | From Cicero, New York |
| Natalie Stoltz | Forward | United States | From St. Paul, Minnesota |
| Kara Power | Forward | Canada | From New Glasgow, Nova Scotia |

=== Transfers ===
| Player | Position | Nationality | Year | Former school |
| Lauren Barnes | Forward | United States | Sophomore | Mercyhurst |

== Regular season ==
=== News and notes ===
- September 30: The Minnesota State Mavericks nearly gave the Lindenwood Lady Lions its first NCAA Division I win versus the Minnesota State Mavericks. The Lady Lions fought back from a two goal deficit with two third-period goals. A late goal by Kathleen Rogan gave Minnesota State a 4-3 lead, which they would not relinquish. At 5:24 in the second period. Less than a minute later, Kendra Broad scored the first goal in Lindenwood's NCAA history unassisted. Minnesota State outshot the Lady Lions 53-16, as Lady Lions goaltender Taylor Fairchild made 49 saves.
- October 7: Minnesota State senior Emmi Leinonen scored the first two goals in the game versus Mercyhurst. In overtime, Nicole Germaine scored her first goal of the year as the Mavericks upset the nationally ranked Mercyhurst Lakers by a 3-2 tally.
- October 8: Minnesota State was unable to extend its three-game winning streak as #8 nationally ranked Mercyhurst (2-2-0) scored in the third period to win by a 5-4 score. Lakers forward Christine Bestland scored the game-winning goal as Mavericks goaltender Danielle Butters suffered her first loss of the season.

=== Standings ===
2011–12 Western Collegiate Hockey Association standings
| | Conference | | | | | | | | Overall | | | | | |
| | GP | W | L | T | SW | PTS | GF | GA | GP | W | L | T | GF | GA |
|---|---|---|---|---|---|---|---|---|---|---|---|---|---|---|
| #1 Wisconsin† | 28 | 23 | 3 | 2 | 1 | 72 | 113 | 44 | 37 | 31 | 4 | 2 | 170 | 53 |
| #2 Minnesota* | 28 | 21 | 5 | 2 | 1 | 66 | 113 | 43 | 37 | 30 | 5 | 2 | 167 | 50 |
| #6 North Dakota | 28 | 16 | 9 | 3 | 2 | 53 | 116 | 75 | 36 | 22 | 11 | 3 | 154 | 89 |
| #9 Minnesota Duluth | 28 | 15 | 12 | 1 | 1 | 47 | 91 | 61 | 36 | 21 | 13 | 1 | 121 | 77 |
| Ohio State | 28 | 13 | 14 | 1 | 1 | 41 | 75 | 96 | 36 | 16 | 16 | 4 | 99 | 115 |
| Bemidji State | 28 | 11 | 15 | 2 | 0 | 35 | 70 | 73 | 37 | 17 | 17 | 3 | 101 | 85 |
| St. Cloud State | 28 | 4 | 24 | 0 | 0 | 12 | 32 | 150 | 36 | 5 | 29 | 2 | 37 | 130 |
| Minnesota State | 28 | 3 | 24 | 1 | 0 | 10 | 37 | 105 | 36 | 7 | 28 | 1 | 64 | 133 |
Championship: Minnesota † indicates conference regular season champion * indicates conference tournament champion National rankings: Conference rankings: Updated March 23, 2012

=== Schedule ===
| Date | Opponent | Location | Score | Record |
| 9/30/2011 | Lindenwood University | Mankato, Minn. | W 4-3 | 1-0-0 |
| 10/1/2011 | Lindenwood University | Mankato, Minn. | W 10-2 | 2-0-0 |
| 10/7/2011 | Mercyhurst | Mankato, Minn. | W 3-2 | |
| 10/8/2011 | Mercyhurst | Mankato, Minn. | L 4-5 | |
| 10/14/2011 | Robert Morris University | Pittsburgh, Pa. | | |
| 10/15/2011 | Robert Morris University | Pittsburgh, Pa. | | |
| 10/20/2011 | University of Minnesota | Minneapolis, Minn. | | |
| 10/21/2011 | University of Minnesota | Minneapolis, Minn. | | |
| 10/28/2011 | Ohio State | Mankato, Minn. | | |
| 10/29/2011 | Ohio State | Mankato, Minn. | | |
| 11/4/2011 | Bemidji State University | Mankato, Minn. | | |
| 11/5/2011 | Bemidji State University | Mankato, Minn. | | |
| 11/18/2011 | University of North Dakota | Grand Forks, N.D. | | |
| 11/19/2011 | University of North Dakota | Grand Forks, N.D. | | |
| 12/2/2011 | University of Wisconsin | Mankato, Minn. | | |
| 12/3/2011 | University of Wisconsin | Mankato, Minn. | | |
| 12/9/2011 | St. Cloud State University | St. Cloud, Minn. | | |
| 12/10/2011 | St. Cloud State University | St. Cloud, Minn. | | |
| 12/16/2011 | University of Minnesota Duluth | Mankato, Minn. | | |
| 12/17/2011 | University of Minnesota Duluth | Mankato, Minn. | | |
| 1/6/2012 | Bemidji State University | Bemidji, Minn. | | |
| 1/7/2012 | Bemidji State University | Bemidji, Minn. | | |
| 1/13/2012 | St. Cloud State University | Mankato, Minn. | | |
| 1/14/2012 | St. Cloud State University | Mankato, Minn. | | |
| 1/20/2012 | Ohio State | Columbus, Ohio | | |
| 1/21/2012 | Ohio State | Columbus, Ohio | | |
| 1/27/2012 | University of Minnesota | Mankato, Minn. | | |
| 1/28/2012 | University of Minnesota | Mankato, Minn. | | |
| 2/3/2012 | University of Wisconsin | Madison, Wis. | | |
| 2/5/2012 | University of Wisconsin | Madison, Wis. | | |
| 2/10/2012 | University of North Dakota | Mankato, Minn. | | |
| 2/11/2012 | University of North Dakota | Mankato, Minn. | | |
| 2/17/2012 | University of Minnesota Duluth | Duluth, Minn. | | |
| 2/18/2012 | University of Minnesota Duluth | Duluth, Minn. | | |

== Awards and honors ==
- Alli Altmann, Minnesota State, WCHA Defensive Player of the Week (Week of December 14, 2011)
- Kathleen Rogan, WCHA Player of the Week (Week of October 5, 2011)
