= Jen Schoullis =

American ice hockey player (born 1989)

- Born: March 7, 1989 (age 37) Erie, Pennsylvania, USA
- Height: 5 ft 9 in (175 cm)
- Weight: 165 lb (75 kg; 11 st 11 lb)
- Position: Forward
- Shoots: Left
- WCHA team: Minnesota
- National team: United States
- Playing career: 2008–present
Medal record
Representing United States
Women's ice hockey
IIHF World Women's Championships
Gold medal – first place	2011 Switzerland	Tournament
Gold medal – first place	2013 Canada	Tournament
Women's 4 Nations Cup
Gold medal – first place	2011 Sweden	Tournament

Jen Schoullis (born March 7, 1989) was a women's ice hockey player for the Minnesota Golden Gophers women's ice hockey program who made her debut for the United States women's national ice hockey team at the 2011 IIHF Women's World Championship.

== Playing career ==
Schoullis played for Shattuck-St. Mary's Under 19 Team. She was part of the team that played in three straight U19 national championships in 2004–05, 2005–06 and the 2006–07 seasons.

=== NCAA ===
Schoullis was recruited by Wisconsin and Mercyhurst, but decided to play for Minnesota. During the 2010–11 season, Schoullis was named the Assistant Captain of the Gophers squad. She appeared in 38 games and her 32 points were tied for fourth in team scoring. On February 19, 2011, she scored her first career short handed goal in a 5–3 loss to North Dakota. In a 6–1 defeat of New Hampshire on November 19, 2011, Schoullis factored on every goal, as she tied the Gophers record for assists in a game with five. With three points in the first period, Schoullis also set a career record for points in a period.

=== USA Hockey ===
From April 4 to 12, 2011, she was one of 30 players that took part in a selection / training camp. She was named to the final roster that participated at the 2011 IIHF Women's World Championship. In the second game of the 2011 IIHF Eight Nations Tournament, Schoullis was one of two US players to register a hat trick in a victory over Japan.

== Awards and honors ==
- 2005 Chicago Showcase Most Sportsmanlike
- 2006 Keystone State Games Best Female Athlete award
- Letterwinner, Minnesota, 2010–11
