= 2011 IIHF 12 Nations Tournament =

2011 12 Nations Invitational Tournament Series
12 Nations Tournament

Tournament details
- Host country: Finland
- Venues: 2
- Dates: August 24–31
- Teams: 12

The IIHF 12 Nations Invitational Tournament Series was held in Vierumäki, Finland (August 24–31), Courchevel, France (August 28–30), and Füssen, Germany (November 9–13). The competing nations will be the national women's teams. This is a new tournament introduced by the International Ice Hockey Federation. The goal is to close the large gaps in skill between countries by providing more competitive opportunities. The eight competing countries in Vierumaki, Finland are Canada, United States, Finland, Sweden, Russia, Switzerland, Slovakia and Japan. France, Germany, Norway and the Czech Republic also played in a mini-tournament simultaneously in Courchevel, France. Teams from Group B and C played in the tournament held in Füssen.

There were no medals awarded at the tournament, and its main purpose was to develop players from countries attempting to qualify for the Olympic Games in 2014.

Mistaken Identity. The name of the tournament was mistakenly printed on several publications and websites as the "IIHF 8 Nations Tournament". The "IIHF 12 Nations Invitational Tournament Series" was the official name for the tournament.

== Participating nations ==
Group A

- Canada
- Finland
- Sweden
- United States

Group B

- Japan
- Russia
- Slovakia
- Switzerland

Group C

- Germany
- France
- Norway
- Czech Republic

== Group A/B ==
=== Round robin ===
- August 29: Jayna Hefford scored once in regulation time and twice in the shootout as Canada triumphed against the United States by a 4-3 mark in an exhibition game. Hilary Knight scored on the Americans' first two shots for a 2-0 lead just 1:55 in as Liz Knox was pulled from the game. Gillian Apps tallied a goal less than a minute after Knight’s second goal and Jocelyne Larocque evened at 7:41, as four goals were registered in the first eight minutes.

The teams exchanged goals late in the second period. Brianna Decker scored for the US, while Jayna Hefford replied with a power play goal. Afterwards, Genevieve Lacasse and Jessie Vetter made a combined 31 saves in the third period and overtime, forcing a shootout between the rivals. In the first five rounds of said shootout, Hefford and Kelli Stack traded goals. Afterwards, Hefford proceeded to give Canada another lead as she scored again in the shootout. Jennifer Wakefield followed to beat Vetter for the game winner.

=== August 24 ===
Date	Teams	Result	Notes
August 24	USA vs. Russia	USA, 12-0	Hat trick scored by Hilary Knight
August 24	Canada vs. Switzerland	Canada, 16-0	Jayna Hefford scored a hat trick
August 24	Finland vs. Japan	Finland, 7-0	
August 24	Sweden vs. Slovakia	Sweden, 4-1	

=== August 25 ===
Date	Teams	Result	Notes
August 25	USA vs. Japan	USA, 13-0	Kelli Stack and Jen Schoullis each scored a hat trick
August 25	Canada vs. Russia	Canada, 14-1	Meghan Agosta scored a hat trick and added two assists
August 25	Finland vs. Slovakia	Finland, 2-0	
August 25	Sweden vs. Switzerland	Sweden, 4-2	

=== August 27 ===
Date	Teams	Result	Notes
August 27	USA vs. Switzerland	USA, 11-1	
August 27	Canada vs. Slovakia	Canada, 11-0	Vicki Bendus registered a hat trick and added one assist Canada outshot Slovakia 73-8
August 27	Finland vs. Russia	Finland, 2-1	
August 27	Sweden vs. Japan	Sweden, 8-2	

=== August 28 ===
Date	Teams	Result	Notes
August 28	USA vs. Canada	USA, 4-0	Shutout by Molly Schaus
August 28	Sweden vs. Russia	Sweden, 4-3	
August 28	Finland vs. Switzerland	Finland, 12-0	
August 28	Slovakia vs. Japan	Slovakia, 4-0	

=== August 30 ===
Date	Teams	Result	Notes
August 30	Canada vs. Finland	Canada, 3-2	Caroline Ouellette had three assists
August 30	USA vs. Sweden	USA, 2-0	

=== August 31 ===
Date	Teams	Result	Notes
August 31	Sweden vs. Canada	Sweden, 6-4	Canada lost for just the second time in 66 all-time international meetings against Sweden by a 6-4 mark.
August 31	USA vs. Finland	USA, 6-0	Molly Schaus and Jessie Vetter both played and shared the shutout

=== September 2 and 3 ===
Date	Teams	Result	Notes
September 2	Sweden vs. Finland	Sweden, 3-1	
September 3	Sweden vs. Finland	Sweden, 4-2	

== Group C ==
All games for Group C were contested at the Olympic Ice Rink in Courchevel, France from August 28–30. Norway players Helene Martinsen led all Group C players in scoring with 8 points, while teammate Andrea Dalen ranked second in Group C scoring with 6 points.

=== Schedule ===
Date	Teams	Result	Notes
August 28	France vs. Germany	Germany, 2-1	
August 28	Czech Republic vs. Norway	Norway, 5-3	
August 29	Czech Republic vs. Germany	Germany, 4-1	
August 29	France vs. Norway	Norway, 6-1	
August 30	Germany vs. Norway	Germany, 4-3 (OT)	

== Group B/C ==
The tournament was played in Füssen, Germany from November 9–13.

=== Round robin ===
All teams took part in four games.

=== November 9 ===
Date	Teams	Result	Notes
November 9	Russia vs. Czech Republic	Russia, 1-0	
November 9	Japan vs. Norway	Norway, 4-3 SO	
November 9	Switzerland vs. France	Switzerland, 2-1	
November 9	Slovakia vs. Germany	Germany, 3-0	

=== November 10 ===
Date	Teams	Result	Notes
November 10	Switzerland vs. Czech Republic	Czech Republic, 6-3	
November 10	France vs. Slovakia	Slovakia, 1-0	
November 10	Norway vs. Russia	Norway, 3-2	
November 10	Germany vs. Japan	Japan, 3-1	

=== November 12 ===
Date	Teams	Result	Notes
November 12	Switzerland vs. Norway	Norway, 5-3	
November 12	Slovakia vs. Czech Republic	Czech Republic, 4-2	
November 12	Russia vs. Germany	Germany, 3-2 SO	
November 12	Japan vs. France	Japan, 5-1	

=== November 13 ===
Date	Teams	Result	Notes
November 13	Norway vs. Slovakia	Norway, 3-1	
November 13	Czech Republic vs. Japan	Japan, 2-1	
November 13	Russia vs. France	Russia, 7-1	
November 13	Germany vs. Switzerland	Germany, 2-1	

== External news story ==
- (in French) Ouellette et les Canadiennes terminent avec une défaite
- (in French) Le Canada amorce le tournoi des 12 Nations avec un gain de 16-0
- (in French) Victoire in extremis des Canadiennes
- 2011 Women's Twelve Nations Central
- U.S. Women's National Team Shuts Out Russia, 12-0, at 2011 Women's IIHF Twelve Nations Invitational Tournament Series
- U.S. Women's National Team Shuts Out Japan, 13-0, at 2011 Women's IIHF Twelve Nations Invitational Tournament Series
- U.S. Women's National Team Shuts Out Finland, 6-0, at 2011 Women's IIHF Twelve Nations Invitational Tournament Series
