= 2011–12 Canada women's national ice hockey team =

The 2011–12 women's national hockey team represented Canada in various tournaments during the 2011-12 hockey season. The head coach of the National team was York Lions women's ice hockey coach Dan Church.

== News and notes ==
- June 23, 2011: Sixteen of Hockey Canada's National Women's Program candidates will travel to Bratislava, Slovakia to participate in the 2011 IIHF High Performance Women's Camp from July 4–12. As part of the IIHF Ambassador and Mentor Program, Hockey Canada will send six coaching mentors (Melody Davidson, Doug Lidster, Rick Polutnik, Daniele Sauvageau, France St. Louis and Nancy Wilson) and four athlete ambassadors (Correne Bredin, Therese Brisson, Fiona Smith-Bell, and Gina Kingsbury).
  - Under 18 players

Name	Position
Beth Clause	Goaltender
Kayla Black	Goaltender
Brianna Quade	Goaltender
Halli Krzyzaniak	Defence
Taylor Accursi	Forward
Hanna Bunton	Forward
Kristyn Capizzano	Forward
Sydney McKibbon	Forward
Sarah Nurse	Forward

  - Senior players

Name	Position
Beth Clause	Goaltender
Liz Knox	Goaltender
Christina Kessler	Goaltender
Genevieve Lacasse	Goaltender
Courtney Birchard	Defence
Vicki Bendus	Forward
Mallory Deluce	Forward
Jesse Scanzano	Forward

- July 21, 2011: Philanthropist Joan Snyder donated $2 million to Winsport Canada. The goal is to ensure priority rink access to female hockey players at all levels, and help expand the Canadian Women's Hockey League with the creation of Team Alberta. Part of the donation will cover the new addition to the Athletic and Ice Complex at Canada Olympic Park in Calgary. This will serve as the future home to Hockey Canada. In addition, there shall be four hockey rinks, one of which will be aptly called the Joan Snyder Rink.
- On August 22, 2011, CBC television announced that Tessa Bonhomme will compete in their figure skating competition TV program Battle of the Blades. She is the first female hockey player to be a competitor in Battle of the Blades. Bonhomme is paired with David Pelletier, also an Olympic Gold Medalist, and they want to give the NHL players a run for their money.
- September 22, 2011: Kim St. Pierre has decided to take the season off and have a baby. This has led to an opening for a third goaltender on the squad. Christina Kessler and Genevieve Lacasse are being considered as possible replacements.
- October 2: Hockey Canada joined other hockey federations for the first-ever World Girls' Hockey Day. The initiative was spearheaded by the International Ice Hockey Federation as part of its initiatives to help grow the women's game.

== National team ==
- June 30, 2011: Team captain Hayley Wickenheiser was awarded the Order of Canada. Wickenheiser was in Ghana on behalf of Right to Play and was unable to accept the honour in person.
- August 8, 2011: York Lions women's ice hockey head coach Dan Church has been named the head coach for the 2011 IIHF Eight Nations Tournament and the 2011 Four Nations Cup. Assisting him will be Doug Derragh from the Cornell Big Red women's ice hockey program and Danielle Goyette from the Calgary Dinos women's ice hockey program.
- On August 23, 2011, Delaney Collins announced her retirement from international play.

=== 2011 IIHF 12 Nations Tournament ===
==== Schedule ====
- In the 14-1 win over Russia, several Canadian players accomplished numerous milestones. Meghan Mikkelson reached her 50th game played with the National team. Meghan Agosta reached the 100th point mark, while Jayna Hefford reached the 250th career point mark
- August 31, 2011: Canada was bested by Sweden for just the second time in 66 all-time international meetings. Mallory Deluce opened the scoring 11 seconds into the game, while Meghan Agosta scored a hat trick. Canada suffered from a 4-1 second-period deficit and lost by a 6-4 score.

Date	Teams	Result	Notes
August 24	Canada vs. Switzerland	Canada, 16-0	Jayna Hefford scored a hat trick
August 25	Canada vs. Russia	Canada, 14-1	Meghan Agosta scored a hat trick and added two assists
August 27	Canada vs. Slovakia	Canada, 11-0	Vicki Bendus registered a hat trick and added one assist Canada outshot Slovakia 73-8
August 28	USA vs. Canada	USA, 4-0	
August 30	Canada vs. Finland	Canada, 3-2	
August 28	Canada vs. Sweden	Sweden, 6-4	Hat trick by Meghan Agosta

==== Roster ====
Name	Position	Team
Christina Kessler	Goaltender	Burlington Barracudas
Liz Knox	Goaltender	Laurier Golden Hawks women's ice hockey
Genevieve Lacasse	Goaltender	Providence Friars women's ice hockey
Jocelyne Larocque	Defence	Minnesota Duluth Bulldogs women's ice hockey
Meaghan Mikkelson	Defence	Team Alberta (CWHL)
Bobbi-Jo Slusar	Defence	Team Alberta (CWHL)
Catherine Ward	Defence	Montreal Stars
Tessa Bonhomme	Defence	Toronto CWHL
Courtney Birchard	Defence	New Hampshire Wildcats women's ice hockey
Meghan Agosta	Forward	Montreal Stars
Gillian Apps	Forward	Brampton Thunder
Caroline Ouellette	Forward	Montreal Stars
Jayna Hefford	Forward	Brampton Thunder
Jennifer Wakefield	Forward	Boston University Terriers women's ice hockey
Haley Irwin	Forward	Minnesota Duluth
Vicki Bendus	Forward	Mercyhurst Lakers women's ice hockey
Emmanuelle Blais	Forward	Montreal Stars
Mallory Deluce	Forward	Wisconsin Badgers women's ice hockey
Jesse Scanzano	Forward	Toronto CWHL

=== 2011 4 Nations Cup ===
- October 3, 2011: Hockey Canada released the roster that will compete at the 2011 4 Nations Cup in Sweden. Cornell defender Laura Fortino, Wisconsin forward Stefanie McKeough, Dawson College forward Cassandra Poudrier, Cornell forward Lauriane Rougeau, and McGill forward Mélodie Daoust will make their debuts with the Canadian national women's ice hockey team at the event.
- The November 10 match between Canada and the US marked the 100th time since 1990 that the two countries have played each other.

==== Schedule ====
Date	Teams	Score	Notes
November 9	Canada vs. Finland	5–0	Shutout by Shannon Szabados
November 10	Canada vs. USA	3–1	Game winning goal scored by Hayley Wickenheiser; Jocelyne Lamoureux was named the U.S. Player of the Game
November 12	Sweden vs. Canada	1–3	Jennifer Wakefield notched the game-winning goal

==== Roster ====
Number	Name	Shoots	Height	Weight	Hometown	Club
1	Shannon Szabados	L	5'8	147	Edmonton, Alta.	Northern Alberta Institute of Technology
30	Christina Kessler	L	5'6	139	Mississauga, Ont.	Burlington Barracudas
32	Charline Labonté	L	5'9	163	Boisbriand, Que.	McGill Martlets
3	Jocelyne Larocque	L	5'6	140	Ste. Anne, Man.	Manitoba Maple Leafs
4	Stefanie McKeough	L	5'7	146	Carlsbad Springs, Ont.	Wisconsin Badgers
5	Lauriane Rougeau	L	5'8	166	Beaconsfield, Que.	Cornell Big Red
8	Laura Fortino	L	5'4	144	Hamilton, Ont.	Cornell Big Red
11	Courtney Birchard	L	5'9	151	Mississauga, Ont.	Brampton Thunder
14	Bobbi Jo Slusar	L	5'4	140	Swift Current, Sask.	Team Alberta (CWHL)
17	Cassandra Poudrier	L	5'5	147	Lachenaie, Que.	Dawson College
2	Meghan Agosta	L	5'7	147	Ruthven, Ont.	Montreal Stars
6	Rebecca Johnston	L	5'9	145	Sudbury, Ont.	Cornell Big Red
10	Gillian Apps	L	6'0	177	Unionville, Ont.	Brampton Thunder
16	Jayna Hefford	L	5'5	138	Kingston, Ont.	Brampton Thunder
19	Brianne Jenner	R	5'9	159	Oakville, Ont.	Cornell Big Red
20	Jennifer Wakefield	R	5'10	166	Pickering, Ont.	Boston University Terriers
21	Haley Irwin	L	5'7	172	Thunder Bay, Ont.	Minnesota Duluth Bulldogs
22	Hayley Wickenheiser	R	5'10	171	Shaunavon, Sask.	Calgary Dinos
23	Mélodie Daoust	L	5'6	157	Valleyfield, Que.	McGill Martlets
24	Natalie Spooner	R	5'9	186	Scarborough, Ont.	Ohio State Buckeyes
27	Jesse Scanzano	R	6'0	188	Montreal, Que.	Toronto Furies
28	Vicki Bendus	R	5'2	110	Wasaga Beach, Ont.	Brampton Thunder
29	Marie-Philip Poulin	L	5'6	160	Beauceville, Que.	Boston University Terriers

=== IIHF Worlds ===
In preparation for the 2012 IIHF Women's World Championship, the National Team held a training camp at Carleton University in Ottawa from March 27 to 30.

==== Exhibition ====
Date	Arena	Opponent	Score	Goal scorers
March 28, 2012	Duchesnay Arena; Aylmer, QC	St-Eustache Midget AAA Vikings	3-2 (Shootout)	Hayley Wickenheiser, Haley Irwin, Cherie Piper
March 29, 2012	Duchesnay Arena; Aylmer, QC	Midget AAA Rousseau Royal de Laval-Montréal	6-1	Gillian Apps (2), Caroline Ouellette, Jocelyne Larocque, Jayna Hefford
March 31, 2012	Ottawa Civic Centre	United States women's national ice hockey team	1-0	Laura Fortino

==== Tournament ====
In the opening match of the tournament, the US team scored five goals in the first five minutes and 32 seconds. In 102 prior contests, the Canadian team had never allowed more than seven goals. That was in a 7-3 loss on January 6, 2002 in Detroit. Jocelyne Lamoureux scored three goals while assisting on three others. Her sister, Monique Lamoureux-Kolls and Hilary Knight each scored twice. Haley Irwin left the game during the first period as she fell into the boards behind the American net

In a game versus Russia at the 2012 IIHF Women's World Championship, Wickenheiser accumulated six points (two goals, four assists) in a 14-1 victory.

Date	Opponent	Score	Goal scorers
April 7, 2012	United States	2-9	Natalie Spooner, Marie-Philip Poulin
April 10, 2012	Russia	14-1	

== Under 18 team ==
=== Training camp ===
- May 19, 2011: Hockey Canada announced 49 players will attend the National Under 18 conditioning camp from May 25 to 29, 2011 at McMaster University in Hamilton, Ontario.
- The Under 18 team held another strength and conditioning camp in August 2011 at the Canadian International Hockey Academy in Rockland, Ontario. The invitees were separated into two teams: Team Red and Team White.
- Intrasquad games

Date	Score	Team Red scorers	Team White scorers
August 10	1-0 Team Red	Ashleigh Brykaliuk	None
August 12	3-2 Team White (Shootout)	Nicole Connery, Meghan Dufault	Hanna Bunton, Kristyn Capizzano
August 13	2-1 Team White	Ashleigh Brykaliuk	Abbey Frazier, Vickie Lemire

=== Exhibition ===
From August 18 to 21, the Under 18 team will compete versus the United States in a three game series at the Canadian International Hockey Academy in Rockland, Ontario.

Date	Score	Canada scorers	USA scorers
August 18	3-2 USA	Meghan Dufault (2)	Anne Pankowski, Kaliya Johnson, Paige Savage
August 19	3-2 Canada	Erin Ambrose, Rebecca Kohler, Nicole Connery	Alex Carpenter, Anne Pankowski
August 21	6-4 Canada	Laura Stacey (2), Meghan Dufault, Emily Clark, Rebecca Kohler, Cayley Mercer	Dana Trivigno, Sydney Daniels, Dani Cameranesi, Hayley Skarupa

==== Roster ====
Player	Position	Height	Province
Elaine Chuli	Goaltender	5-6	Ontario
Emerance Maschmeyer	Goaltender	5-6	Alberta
Erin Ambrose	Defence	5-5	Ontario
Melissa Channell	Defence	5-5	Ontario
Alexis Crossley	Defence	5-8	Nova Scotia
Jordan Krause	Defence	5-9	British Columbia
Halli Krzyzaniuk	Defence	5-8	Manitoba
Morgan Richardson	Defence	5-4	Ontario
Cydney Roesler	Defence	5-9	Ontario
Ashley Brykaliuk	Forward	5-5	Manitoba
Hanna Bunton	Forward	5-8	Ontario
Emily Clark	Forward	5-5	Saskatchewan
Nicole Connery	Forward	5-6	Ontario
Meghan Dufault	Forward	5-3	Manitoba
Rebecca Kohler	Forward	5-11	Ontario
Vickie Lemire	Forward	5-10	Quebec
Shannon MacAulay	Forward	5-11	Prince Edward Island
Julia McKinnon	Forward	5-8	British Columbia
Cayley Mercer	Forward	5-8	Ontario
Erika Sowchuk	Forward	5-6	Alberta
Laura Stacey	Forward	5-10	Ontario
Taylor Woods	Forward	5-3	Manitoba

==== Player stats ====
Player	GP	G	A	PTS	PIM	PPG
Laura Stacey	3	2	3	5	0	0
Meghan Dufault	3	3	1	4	0	3
Erin Ambrose	3	1	3	4	2	0
Nicole Connery	3	3	4	7	2	0
Cayley Mercer	3	1	2	3	2	0
Rebecca Kohler	3	2	0	2	6	0
Halli Krzyzaniuk	3	0	2	2	6	0
Emily Clark	3	1	0	1	0	0
Ashley Brykaliuk	3	0	1	1	0	0
Jordan Krause	3	0	1	1	4	0
Shannon MacAulay	3	0	1	1	4	0
Morgan Richardson	3	0	1	1	0	0
Alexis Crossley	3	0	0	0	2	0
Sidney Peters	3	0	0	0	2	0
Cydney Roesler	3	0	0	0	2	0

=== IIHF Worlds ===
Canada was in Pool B at the 2012 IIHF World Women's U18 Championship. Alexis Crossley scored the game-winning goal for Team Canada in the gold medal game at the 2012 IIHF World Women's U18 Championship, a 3-0 triumph over the United States. Emerance Maschmeyer earned the shutout for Team Canada.

Date	Teams	Arena	Score	Goal scorers
December 31, 2011	Canada vs. Switzerland		13-1	Catherine Dubois (3), Cayley Mercer (2), Taylor Woods (2), Rebecca Kohler, Laura Stacey, Cydney Roesler, Alexis Crossley, Nicole Connery, Emily Clark
January 1, 2012	Canada vs. Germany		6-0	Taylor Woods, Erin Ambrose, Laura Stacey, Cydney Roesler, Rebecca Kohler, Catherine Dubois
January 3, 2012	Canada vs. Finland	Zimní stadion Přerov	7-0	Nicole Connery, Emily Clark, Laura Stacey, Rebecca Kohler, Meghan Dufault, Sarah Lefort, Cydney Roesler

==== Roster ====
Number	Name	Position	Shoots	Height	Club
29	Elaine Chuli	G	Left	5'6	Stoney Creek (PWHL)
30	Emerance Maschmeyer	G	Left	5'6	Lloydminster (AJHL)
2	Morgan Richardson	D	L	5'4	Ottawa (PWHL)
10	Alexis Crossley	D	L	5'8	Shattuck St. Mary's
13	Erin Ambrose	D	R	5'5	Toronto (PWHL)
14	Jordan Krause	D	R	5'9	Pursuit of Excellence
18	Halli Krzyzaniak	D	R	5'8	Pursuit of Excellence
21	Cydney Roesler	D	R	5'9	Ottawa (PWHL)
23	Abbey Frazier	D	L	5'6	John Abbott College (Collégial AA)
3	Emily Clark	F	L	5'5	Saskatoon (SFMAAAHL)
5	Ashleigh Brykaliuk	F	R	5'5	Balmoral Hall (JWHL)
7	Laura Stacey	F	R	5'10	Toronto (PWHL)
11	Taylor Woods	F	R	5'3	Balmoral Hall (JWHL)
12	Kristyn Capizzano	F	L	5'2	Mississauga (PWHL)
15	Meghan Dufault	F	R	5'3	Balmoral Hall (JWHL)
16	Sarah Lefort	F	L	5'7	Stanstead College
19	Erika Sowchuk	F	L	5'6	Edge School (JWHL)
20	Cayley Mercer	F	L	5'7	Bluewater (PWHL)
24	Nicole Connery	F	L	5'6	Mississauga (PWHL)
25	Rebecca Kohler	F	R	5'11	Bluewater (PWHL)
26	Shannon MacAulay	F	L	5'11	Warner School (JWHL)
28	Catherine Dubois	F		5'8	Ontario Hockey Academy

== Under 22 team ==
=== Training camp ===
The Under 22 team held their training camp in August 2011 at the Canadian International Hockey Academy in Rockland, Ontario. The invitees were separated into two teams: Team Blue and Team Yellow. The August 13 match resulted in 14 skaters participating in the shootout. Dartmouth Big Green women's ice hockey skater Sasha Nanji scored the game-winning goal in the shootout. In the third contest, Isabel Menard passed to Laura Fortino as she scored the game-winning goal for Team Blue at 30 seconds of the first overtime. With the win, Team Blue won the series by a 2-1 margin.

- Intrasquad games

Date	Score	Team Blue scorers	Team Yellow scorers
August 11	5-2 Team Blue	Natalie Spooner, Carolyne Prevost (3), Tara Watchorn	Lauriane Rougeau, Laura McIntosh
August 13	3-2 Team Yellow (Shootout)	Laura Fortino (2)	Laura McIntosh, Kristine Grenier, Sasha Nanji
August 16	Team Blue, 3-2 (OT)	Isabel Menard, Melodie Daoust, Laura Fortino	Christine Bestland, Shelby Bram

==== Rosters ====
===== Team Blue =====
Player	Position	Height	Team
Roxanne Douville	Goaltender	5-5	Vermont
Erica Howe	Goaltender	5-8	Clarkson
Hayleigh Cudmore	Defence	5-4	Cornell
Mel Desrochers	Defence	5-4	St. Lawrence
Laura Fortino	Defence	5-4	Cornell
Brittany Haverstock	Defence	5-6.5	Wisconsin
Cassandra Poudrier	Defence	5-5	Dawson College
Tara Watchorn	Defence	5-10	Boston University
Kelly Babstock	Forward	5-8	Quinnipiac
Bailey Bram	Forward	5-7	Mercyhurst
Jessica Campbell	Forward	5-4.5	Cornell
Melodie Daoust	Forward	5-6	Edouard-Montpetit
Sarah Davis	Forward	5-4	Minnesota
Reagan Fischer	Forward	5-8	Dartmouth
Jenelle Kohanchuk	Forward	5-7	Boston University
Isabel Menard	Forward	5-6	Syracuse
Carly Mercer	Forward	5-6	Clarkson
Carolyne Prevost	Forward	5-4	Wisconsin
Natalie Spooner	Forward	5-9	Ohio State
Catherine White	Forward	5-10	Cornell

===== Team Yellow =====
Player	Position	Height	Team
Jamie Leonoff	Goaltender	5-7	Detroit Belle Tire
Amanda Mazzotta	Goaltender	5-5	Cornell
Sarah Edney	Defence	5-5	Mississauga (PWHL)
Stefanie McKeough	Defence	5-7	Wisconsin
Sasha Nanji	Defence	5-6	Dartmouth
Saige Pacholok	Defence	5-5	Wisconsin
Lauriane Rougeau	Defence	5-8	Cornell
Jessica Wong	Defence	5-6	Minnesota Duluth
Hannah Armstrong	Forward	5-9	New Hampshire
Christine Bestland	Forward	5-6	Mercyhurst
Shelby Bram	Forward	5-1	Eastman Selects
Laura Brooker	Forward	5-5	Laurier
Kristine Grenier	Forward	5-5	Pembina Valley
Brianne Jenner	Forward	5-9	Cornell
Nicole Kosta	Forward	5-5	Mississauga (PWHL)
Laura McIntosh	Forward	5-5	Ohio State
Marie-Philip Poulin	Forward	5-6	Boston University
Jamie Lee Rattray	Forward	5-6	Clarkson
Jillian Saulnier	Forward	5-5	Toronto (PWHL
Kelly Terry	Forward	5-6	Minnesota

=== Meco Cup ===
- November 8: Hockey Canada announced its roster for the 2012 Meco Cup.

==== Roster ====
Name	Position	Shoots	Height	Weight	Hometown	Club
Genevieve Lacasse	G	Left	5'9	148	Kingston, Ont.	Providence Friars
Amanda Mazzotta	G	Left	5'5	155	London, Ont.	Cornell Big Red
Melissa Channell	D	Left	5'5	130	Oakville, Ont.	Burlington Jr. Barracudas (PWHL)
Sarah Edney	D	Left	5'5	133	Mississauga, Ont.	Harvard Crimson
Brittany Haverstock	D	Left	5'6	138	Hammonds Plains, N.S.	Wisconsin Badgers
Hayleigh Cudmore	D	Right	5'4	146	Oakville, Ont.	Cornell Big Red
Tara Watchorn	D	Left	5'10	176	Newcastle, Ont.	Boston University Terriers
Cassandra Poudrier	D	Left	5'5	147	Lachenaie, QC.	Dawson College
Saige Pacholok	D	Right	5'5	140	Edmonton, Alberta	Wisconsin Badgers
Jessica Campbell	F	Left	5'4	137	Melville, Sask.	Cornell Big Red
Jillian Saulnier	F	Left	5'5	144	Halifax, N.S.	Cornell Big Red
Laura McIntosh	F	Left	5'5	152	Waterloo, Ont.	Ohio State Buckeyes
Mallory Deluce	F	Left	5'7	138	London, Ont.	Toronto Furies
Bailey Bram	F	Left	5'7	163	Ste. Anne, MB.	Mercyhurst Lakers
Shelby Bram	F	Left	5'1	112	Ste. Anne, MB.	Mercyhurst Lakers
Chelsea Karpenko	F	Right	5'5	158	Winnipeg, MB.	Cornell Big Red
Jamie Lee Rattray	F	Left	5'6	172	Kanata, Ont.	Clarkson Golden Knights
Catherine White	F	Left	5'10	159	Brampton, Ont.	Cornell Big Red
Isabel Menard	F	Left	5'6	159	Ottawa, Ont.	Boston University Terriers
Sarah Davis	F	Left	5'4	168	Paradise, NL.	Minnesota Golden Gophers
Nicole Kosta	F	Right	5'5	142	Mississauga, Ont.	Quinnipiac Bobcats

The following players were invited but unable to attend:

- Emmanuelle Blais, Montreal Stars
- Mélodie Daoust, McGill University
- Jenelle Kohanchuk, Boston University
- Marie-Philip Poulin, Boston University
- Carolyne Prevost, University of Wisconsin
- Jessica Wong, University of Minnesota Duluth

==== Exhibition ====
Date	Arena	Teams	Score	Goal scorers
Dec. 30	Ondrej Nepela Arena; Bratislava	Canada vs. Slovakia	8-0, Canada	Brittany Haverstock (2), Isabel Menard, Jamie Lee Rattray, Catherine White (2), Laura McIntosh, Cassandra Poudrier
Dec. 31	Ondrej Nepela Arena; Bratislava	Canada vs. Slovakia	5-0, Canada	Catherine White, Nicole Kosta, Shelby Bram, Jamie Lee Rattray, Chelsea Karpenko

===== Scoring leaders =====
Player	Goals	Assists	Points	PIM
Catherine White	3	1	4	0
Jamie Lee Rattray	2	2	4	0
Isabel Menard	1	2	3	0
Brittany Haverstock	2	0	2	0
Shelby Bram	1	1	2	0
Chelsea Karpenko	1	1	2	0
Nicole Kosta	1	1	2	0
Jessica Campbell	0	2	2	2
Mallory Deluce	0	0	2	0
Sarah Edney	0	2	2	0
Jillian Saulnier	0	0	2	0
Laura McIntosh	1	0	1	0
Cassandra Poudrier	1	0	1	0
Bailey Bram	0	1	1	0

==== Schedule ====
Date	Teams	Arena	Score	Goal scorers
Jan. 3			Canada, 4-1	Jillian Saulnier, Chelsea Karpenko, Isabel Menard, Nicole Kosta
Jan. 4	Canada vs. Russia	Ice Rink Füssen Ic	Canada, 6-0	Jamie Lee Rattray, Saige Pacholok, Tara Watchorn, Chelsea Karpenko, Cassandra Poudrier, Catherine White
January 6, 2012	Canada vs. Switzerland	Arena Füssen		
January 7, 2012	Sweden vs. Canada	Arena Füssen		
January 8, 2012	Sweden vs. Finland	Arena Füssen		

== Awards and honours ==
- Erin Ambrose, Directorate Award, Best Defender, 2012 IIHF World Women's U18 Championship.

== See also ==
- 2010–11 Canada women's national ice hockey team
- 2012–13 Canada women's national ice hockey team
- Canada women's national ice hockey team
