= 2013 4 Nations Cup =

Tournament details
- Host country: United States
- Venue: 1 (in 1 host city)
- Dates: 5–9 November
- Teams: 4

Final positions
- Champions: Canada (13th title)
- Runners-up: Finland
- Third place: United States
- Fourth place: Sweden

Tournament statistics
- Games played: 8
- Goals scored: 51 (6.38 per game)

The 2013 4 Nations Cup was a women's ice hockey tournament held in Lake Placid, New York, United States. It was the 18th edition of the 4 Nations Cup.

== Results ==
=== Preliminary round ===
Pos	Team	Pld	W	OTW	OTL	L	GF	GA	GD	Pts	Qualification
1	Canada	3	3	0	0	0	11	6	+5	9	Advance to Gold medal game
2	Finland	3	2	0	0	1	6	4	+2	6	Advance to Gold medal game
3	United States (H)	3	1	0	0	2	13	7	+6	3	Advance to Bronze medal game
4	Sweden	3	0	0	0	3	3	16	−13	0	Advance to Bronze medal game

Source: Hockey Canada
(H) Host

All times are local (UTC−5).

5 November 2013; 15:30	Finland	1–3 (0–2, 0–0, 1–1)	Canada	Herb Brooks Arena, Lake Placid

Game reference

Noora Räty
Goalies
Charline Labonté

	0–1	12:52 – Johnston (Irwin, Jenner) (PP)
	0–2	14:26 – Spooner (Agosta-Marciano, Ward)
	0–3	44:54 – Bendus (Lacquette, Apps)
Vilila (Tikkinen, Räty) (PP) – 53:43	1–3

10 min
Penalties
14 min
23
Shots
39

5 November 2013; 19:00	Sweden	0–10	United States	Herb Brooks Arena, Lake Placid

Game reference

6 November 2013; 15:30	Sweden	0–2	Finland	Herb Brooks Arena, Lake Placid

Game reference

6 November 2013; 19:00	Canada	4–2 (1–1, 1–0, 2–1)	United States	Herb Brooks Arena, Lake Placid

Game reference

Geneviève Lacasse
Goalies
Jessie Vetter

Irwin (Jenner, Johnston) – 05:42	1–0
	1–1	08:27 – Stack (Decker) (PP)
Daoust (Agosta-Marciano, Watchorn) (PP) – 27:31	2–1
	2–2	49:14 – Fry (Lamoureux, Pankowski)
Spooner (Bram) (PP) – 56:30	3–2
Jenner (EN) – 59:48	4–2

8 min
Penalties
8 min
28
Shots
23

7 November 2013; 15:30	Sweden	3–4 (1–1, 2–1, 0–2)	Canada	Herb Brooks Arena, Lake Placid

Game reference

Valentina Wallner
Goalies
Shannon Szabados

Borgqvist (Nordin, Grahm) – 03:43	1–0
	1–1	18:39 – Daoust (Watchorn)
Asserholt (Fällman) (SH) – 24:51	2–1
Bäcklin (Asserholt) – 25:11	3–1
	3–2	26:08 – Spooner (Daoust)
	3–3	43:31 – Spooner (Wakefield, Birchard)
	3–4	46:31 – Hefford (Ward, Agosta-Marciano) (PP)

8 min
Penalties
8 min
11
Shots
45

7 November 2013; 19:00	Finland	3–1	United States	Herb Brooks Arena, Lake Placid

Game reference

=== Bronze medal game ===
9 November 2013; 15:30	Sweden	1–8	United States	Herb Brooks Arena, Lake Placid

Game reference

=== Gold medal game ===
9 November 2013; 19:00	Finland	3–6 (1–4, 1–0, 1–2)	Canada	Herb Brooks Arena, Lake Placid

Game reference

Noora Räty
Goalies
Charline Labonté

	0–1	02:25 – Kohanchuk (Bendus, Lacquette)
Välilä (Lindstedt) – 06:19	1–1
	1–2	07:37 – Bendus (Birchard)
	1–3	09:31 – Wakefield (Daoust)
	1–4	15:26 – Jenner (Bram, Agosta-Marciano)
Kilponen (Välilä, Lindstedt) (PP) – 37:38	2–4
	2–5	40:46 – Kohanchuk (Bendus, Ward) (PP)
Tapani (Hiirikoski, Karvinen) (PP) – 46:49	3–5
	3–6	59:54 – Irwin (Johnston, Hefford)

12 min
Penalties
14 min
22
Shots
45

== Statistics ==
=== Final standings ===
Gold medal	Canada
Silver medal	Finland
Bronze medal	United States
4	Sweden
