= 2011 MLP Nations Cup =

Tournament details
- Host country: Switzerland
- Venue: Bodensee Arena
- Dates: January 4 – 8
- Teams: 6

Final positions
- Champions: Canada (8th title)
- Runners-up: Sweden
- Third place: Russia
- Fourth place: Germany

Tournament statistics
- Games played: 11
- Goals scored: 73 (6.64 per game)
- Attendance: 1,210 (110 per game)
- Scoring leader(s): (Canada) Vicki Bendus (9 points) (Canada) Bailey Bram (9 points)

The 2011 MLP Nations Cup was a women's ice hockey tournament that featured five countries' national teams in addition to Canada, who played with their national under-22 team. Canada defended the title which they had won in 2010. All games were contested at the Bodensee Arena in Kreuzlingen, Switzerland.

== Group stage ==
All times local (CET/UTC +1)

=== Group A ===
Team	Pld	W	OTW	OTL	L	GF	GA	GD	Pts	Qualification
Sweden	2	1	0	1	0	9	6	+3	4	Advance to semifinal
Russia	2	1	0	0	1	4	6	−2	3	Advance to semifinal
Finland	2	0	1	0	1	4	5	−1	2	5th-place match

January 4, 2011; 20:00	Finland	4–3 SO (1–1, 2–2, 0–0) (OT: 0–0) (SO: 1–1)	Sweden	Bodensee Arena; Attendance: 50

Game reference

Anna Vanhatalo
Goalies
Sara Grahn
Referee:
(Germany) Katja Bandlowski

	0–1	05:59 – F. Nevalainen (E. Eliasson, E. Holst)
K. Rantamäki (S. Tuominen, S. Kärnä) – 19:35	1–1
T. Niskanen (K. Rantamäki) (PP) – 22:15	2–1
	2–2	27:44 – T. Enström (R. Stenberg)
K. Rantamäki (S. Kärnä) – 37:02	3–2
	3–3	38:43 – K. Myren (T. Enström)
K. Rantamäki – 65:00	4–3

2 min
Penalties
24 min
40
Shots
41

January 5, 2011; 16:00	Russia	2–0 (1–0, 1–0, 0–0)	Finland	Bodensee Arena; Attendance: 30

Game reference
Anna Prugova	Goalies	Maija Hassinen	Referee: (Germany) Nicole Hertrich
S. Terenteva – 06:23 / 1–0; E. Lebedeva (S. Kolmykova, N. Shiryaeva) – 33:33 / 2–0			Referee: (Germany) Nicole Hertrich
14 min	Penalties	12 min	Referee: (Germany) Nicole Hertrich
43	Shots	40	Referee: (Germany) Nicole Hertrich

January 6, 2011; 16:00	Sweden	6–2 (1–1, 3–0, 2–1)	Russia	Bodensee Arena; Attendance: 90

Game reference

Valentina Lizana
Goalies
Anna Prugova
Referee:
(Germany) Katja Bandlowski

	0–1	02: 16 – T. Burina (G. Skiba, O. Sosina) (PP)
A. Svedin (K. Myren, N. Larsen) – 17:02	1–1
K. Myren (PP) – 26:19	2–1
E. Eliasson (E. Holt, G. Andersson) – 30:56	3–1
A. Östlund (J. Asserholt, K. Johansson) – 39:00	4–1
	4–2	51:06 – I. Dyubanok (G. Skiba) (PP)
A. Svedin (L. Bäckman, T. Enström) – 56:09	5–2
A. Östlund (E. Eliasson, E. Grahm – 59:53	6–2

10 min
Penalties
10 min
53
Shots
37

=== Group B ===
Team	Pld	W	OTW	OTL	L	GF	GA	GD	Pts	Qualification
Canada	2	2	0	0	0	14	0	+14	6	Advance to semifinal
Germany	2	0	1	0	1	5	13	−8	2	Advance to semifinal
Switzerland	2	0	0	1	1	4	10	−6	1	5th-place match

January 4, 2011; 16:00	Canada	5–0 (3–0, 0–0, 2–0)	Switzerland	Bodensee Arena

Game reference

Genevieve Lacasse
Goalies
Sophie Anthamatten
Referee:
(United States) Nicole Hertrich

C. Birchard (J. Saulnier, L. McIntosh) – 10:59	1–0
C. Karpenko (M. Deluce) – 15:09	2–0
J. Campbell (J. Wong) – 19:25	3–0
J. Campbell (V. Bendus) – 53:03	4–0
L. McIntosh (J. Saulnier, I. Menard) – 56:04	5–0

12 min
Penalties
14 min
67
Shots
18

January 5, 2011; 20:00	Switzerland	4–5 OT (1–1, 1–2, 2–1) (OT: 0–1)	Germany	Bodensee Arena; Attendance: 120

Game reference

Florence Schelling
Goalies
Viona Harrer
Referee:
(Canada) Diane Michaud

	0–1	01:36 – B. Evers (A. Lanzl)
S. Marty (S. Wyss, M. Hafliger) (PP) – 04:45	1–1
	1–2	21:15 – J. Zorn (M. Bittner, F. Busch)
	1–3	21:49 – A. Lanzl (B. Evers)
K. Lehmann (R. Michielin) (PP) – 34:45	2–3
	2–4	40:58 – F. Busch (J. Zorn) (PP)
S. Benz (S. Thalmann) – 43:38	3–4
S. Marty (S. Thalmann) (PP) – 46:30	4–4
	4–5	60:43 – J. Zorn (S. Götz)

14 min
Penalties
16 min
44
Shots
57

January 6, 2011; 20:00	Germany	0–9 (0–3, 0–2, 0–4)	Canada	Bodensee Arena; Attendance: 212

Game reference

Jennifer Harss
Goalies
Roxanne Douville
Referee:
(Canada) Diane Michaud

0–1	01:36 – N. Spooner (L. McIntosh)
0–2	02:56 – V. Bendus (B. Bram, J. Saulnier)
0–3	15:45 – J. Saulnier (B. Bram, V. Bendus)
0–4	22:10 – J. Saulnier (V. Bendus, B. Bram)
0–5	36:37 – T. Watchorn (J. Wong)
0–6	41:43 – I. Menard (J. Campbell, S. McKeough)
0–7	42:15 – C. Prevost (I. Menard, J. Kohanchuk)
0–8	42:44 – M. Deluce (C. Prevost, L. Fortino)
0–9	55:59 – S. McKeough (J. Saulnier)

6 min
Penalties
4 min
15
Shots
90

== Knockout stage ==
Semifinals
A1	Sweden	3
B2	Germany	1
B1	Canada	9
A2	Russia	0

Gold-medal game
A1	Sweden	0
B1	Canada	6
Bronze-medal game
B2	Germany	2
A2	Russia	7

5th-place match
A3	Finland	2
B3	Switzerland	3*

Key: * – final in shootout.

=== Semifinals ===
January 7, 2011; 16:00	Canada	9–0 (3–0, 5–0, 1–0)	Russia	Bodensee Arena; Attendance: 63

Game reference

Roxanne Douville
Goalies
Anna Prugova
Valentina Ostrovlyanchik
Referee:
(Germany) Nicole Hertrich

V. Bendus (C. Birchard, T. Watchorn) (PP) – 01:09	1–0
L. Fortino (B. Bram, V. Bendus) – 13:58	2–0
N. Spooner (PS) – 16:18	3–0
C. Karpenko (M. Deluce) – 21:27	4–0
B. Bram (V. Bendus, J. Saulnier) (PP) – 26:07	5–0
C. Karpenko (C. Prevost, M. Deluce) – 26:46	6–0
B. Bram (V. Bendus, C. Birchard) – 31:56	7–0
I. Menard (S. McKeough, J. Campbell) (PP) – 39:26	8–0
C. White (N. Spooner, S. McKeough) (SH) – 53:46	9–0

6 min
Penalties
14 min
48
Shots
13

January 7, 2011; 20:00	Sweden	3–1 (2–0, 0–0, 1–1)	Germany	Bodensee Arena; Attendance: 105

Game reference

Sara Grahn
Goalies
Viona Harrer
Referee:
(Canada) Diane Michaud

J. Asserholt (L. Bäckman) – 01:20	1–0
E. Holst (E. Eliasson, G. Andersson) – 14:57	2–0
A. Östlund (J. Malmström) – 50:56	3–0
	3–1	54:45 – T. Voigt (A. Kuhn, I. Strohmair)

6 min
Penalties
6 min
46
Shots
23

=== 5th-place game ===
January 8, 2011; 10:00	Finland	2–3 SO (0–0, 0–0, 2–2) (OT: 0–0) (SO: 0–1)	Switzerland	Bodensee Arena; Attendance: 110

Game reference

Anna Vanhatolo
Goalies
Florence Schelling
Referee:
(Germany) Nicole Hertrich

S. Touminen (A. Toumanen, K. Rantamäki) (PP) – 42:49	1–0
	1–1	48:50 – S. Benz (E.Rasseli)
	1–2	50:30 – S. Wyss (S. Thalmann, S. Benz) (PP)
S. Touminen (K. Rantamäki, S. Kärnä) (PP) – 52:20	2–2
	2–3	65:00 – C. Meier

8 min
Penalties
24 min
69
Shots
30

=== Bronze-medal game ===
January 8, 2011; 16:00	Germany	2–7 (1–2, 1–3, 0–2)	Russia	Bodensee Arena

Game reference

Jennifer Harss
Goalies
Valentina Ostrovlyanchik
Referee:
(Germany) Katja Bandlowski

S. Kratzer (M. Bittner, N. Kamenik) – 03:59	1–0
	1–1	05:45 – O. Sosina
	1–2	13:50 – N. Shiryaeva (A. Vafina)
	1–3	23:01 – S. Terenteva (A. Vafina, A. Khomich)
	1–4	24:54 – S. Terenteva (O. Semenets, A. Vafina)
M. Bittner (N. Kamenik) – 26:05	2–4
	2–5	28:12 – E. Lebedeva (O. Sosina, M. Sergina) (PP)
	2–6	46:00 – S. Terenteva (G. Skiba)
	2–7	50:51 – G. Skiba (M. Sergina, S. Tkacheva)

14 min
Penalties
16 min
33
Shots
44

=== Gold-medal game ===
January 8, 2011; 20:00	Sweden	0–6 (0–5, 0–1, 0–0)	Canada	Bodensee Arena; Attendance: 200

Game reference

Sara Grahn
Valentina Lizana
Goalies
Genevieve Laccase
Referee:
(Canada) Diane Michaud

0–1	03:12 – L. Fortino
0–2	07:40 – C. White (N. Spooner, L. Rougeau) (PP)
0–3	10:04 – V. Bendus (B. Bram, J. Saulnier)
0–4	16:24 – J. Kohanchuk (B. Bram, I. Menard)
0–5	18:09 – C. Karpenko (M. Deluce, C. Prevost)
0–6	28:24 – B. Bram (C. Birchard)

10 min
Penalties
6 min
37
Shots
60

2011 MLP Nations Cup

Canada
Eighth title

== Ranking and statistics ==
=== Final standings ===
1st place, gold medalist(s)	Canada
2nd place, silver medalist(s)	Sweden
3rd place, bronze medalist(s)	Russia
4	Germany
5	Switzerland
6	Finland

=== Scoring leaders ===
List shows the top skaters sorted by points, then goals. If the list exceeds 10 skaters because of a tie in points, all of the tied skaters are shown.

Player	GP	G	A	Pts	+/−	PIM	POS
(Canada) Vicki Bendus	4	3	6	9	+11	2	FW
(Canada) Bailey Bram	4	3	6	9	+10	2	FW
(Canada) Jillian Saulnier	4	2	6	8	+11	2	FW
(Finland) Karoliina Rantamäki	3	3	3	6	+1	0	FW
(Canada) Isabel Menard	4	2	3	5	+5	2	FW
(Canada) Mallory Deluce	4	1	4	5	+5	2	FW
(Canada) Chelsea Karpenko	4	4	0	4	+5	2	FW
(Russia) Svetlana Terenteva	4	4	0	4	+1	0	FW
(Sweden) Angelica Östlund	4	3	1	4	+3	0	FW
(Canada) Jessica Campbell	4	2	2	4	+4	0	FW
(Sweden) Klara Myren	4	2	2	4	-2	4	FW
(Canada) Natalie Spooner	4	2	2	4	+3	0	FW
(Russia) Galina Skiba	3	1	3	4	0	2	FW
(Canada) Courtney Birchard	4	1	3	4	+8	0	DF
(Sweden) Emma Eliasson	4	1	3	4	+4	8	FW
(Sweden) Tina Enström	4	1	3	4	0	2	FW
(Canada) Stefanie McKeough	4	1	3	4	+5	2	DF
(Canada) Carolyne Prevost	4	1	3	4	+7	2	FW

GP = Games played; G = Goals; A = Assists; Pts = Points; +/− = Plus/minus; PIM = Penalties in minutes; POS = Position

=== Leading goaltenders ===
List contains goaltenders, based on save percentage, who have played 40% of their team's minutes are included in this list.

Player	TOI	GA	GAA	Sv%	SO	Source
(Canada) Roxanne Douville	120:00	0	0.00	100.00	2	
(Canada) Genevieve Lacasse	120:00	0	0.00	100.00	2	
(Sweden) Valentina Lizana	101:51	3	1.77	96.00	0	
(Switzerland) Florence Schelling	125:43	7	3.34	94.44	0	
(Germany) Viona Harrer	120:43	7	3.48	92.22	0	
(Finland) Anna Vanhatalo	130:00	6	2.77	90.00	0	
(Russia) Anna Prugova	146:46	12	4.91	89.57	1	
(Sweden) Sara Grahn	143:09	10	4.19	88.24	0	
(Germany) Jennifer Harss	120:00	16	8.00	88.06	0	

TOI = Time On Ice (minutes:seconds); GA = Goals against; GAA = Goals against average; Sv% = Save percentage; SO = Shutouts
