= 2012 Meco Cup =

Tournament details
- Host country: Germany
- Venues: 5
- Dates: 3–8 January
- Teams: 6

Final positions
- Champions: Sweden
- Runners-up: Finland
- Third place: Canada

The 2012 Meco Cup (formerly known as the MLP Nations Cup) was a women's ice hockey tournament that was held in Germany from January 3 to 8, 2012. Preliminary matches were held in five cities: Bad Tölz, Füssen, Lindau, Miesbach, and Sonthofen. The gold and bronze medal games were both contested at the Arena Füssen in Füssen, Germany.

== Exhibition ==
Date	Arena	Teams	Score	Goal scorers
Dec. 30	Ondrej Nepela Arena; Bratislava	Canada U-22 – Slovakia	8–0	Brittany Haverstock (2), Isabel Ménard, Jamie Lee Rattray, Catherine White (2), Laura McIntosh, Cassandra Poudrier
Dec. 31	Ondrej Nepela Arena; Bratislava	Canada U-22 – Slovakia	5–0	Catherine White, Nicole Kosta, Shelby Bram, Jamie Lee Rattray, Chelsea Karpenko

=== Scoring summary ===
Player	Goals	Assists	Points	PIM
Catherine White	3	1	4	0
Jamie Lee Rattray	2	2	4	0
Isabel Ménard	1	2	3	0
Brittany Haverstock	2	0	2	0
Shelby Bram	1	1	2	0
Chelsea Karpenko	1	1	2	0
Nicole Kosta	1	1	2	0
Jessica Campbell	0	2	2	2
Mallory Deluce	0	0	2	0
Sarah Edney	0	2	2	0
Jillian Saulnier	0	0	2	0
Laura McIntosh	1	0	1	0
Cassandra Poudrier	1	0	1	0
Bailey Bram	0	1	1	0
Jana Kapustová	0	0	0	2
Barbora Kezmarska	0	0	0	2
Klaudia Olosova	0	0	0	2

== Schedule ==
Date	Teams	Score	Arena
January 3, 2012	Russia – Finland	2–3	Arena Füssen
January 3, 2012	Switzerland – Sweden	1–5	Arena Füssen
January 3, 2012	Canada U22 – Germany	4–1	Arena Sonthofen
January 4, 2012	Canada U22 – Russia	6–0	Ice Rink Füssen I
January 4, 2012	Finland – Switzerland	6–4	Ice Rink Füssen I
January 4, 2012	Sweden – Germany	2–1	Eisstadion Miesbach
January 6, 2012	Canada U22 – Switzerland	6–0	Arena Füssen
January 6, 2012	Finland – Sweden	0–3	Arena Füssen
January 6, 2012	Germany – Russia	4–1	Arena Lindau
January 7, 2012	Russia – Switzerland	4–5 (PSO)	Arena Füssen
January 7, 2012	Sweden – Canada U22	3–2 (PSO)	Arena Füssen
January 7, 2012	Finland – Germany	3–0	Arena Lindau
January 8, 2012	Canada U22 – Finland	2–3 (PSO)	Arena Füssen
January 8, 2012	Germany – Switzerland	1–3	Arena Füssen
January 8, 2012	Sweden – Russia	3–1	Arena Füssen

== Standings ==
1. Sweden – 14 pts
2. Finland – 11 pts
3. Canada U22 – 11 pts
4. Switzerland – 5 pts
5. Germany – 3 pts
6. Russia – 1 pts
