= 2012–13 Canada women's national ice hockey team =

The 2012–13 women's national hockey ice team represented Canada in various tournaments during the season. The team attempted to win the gold medal at the Women's World Championships in Ottawa, Ontario. They lost to the USA Women's National Team. The head coach of the National team was then York Lions women's ice hockey coach Dan Church.

== National team ==
=== 2013 IIHF Worlds ===
- Canada enteed the 2013 IIHF Women's World Championship as the defending champion. The tournament served as qualification for the 2015 competition. Canada was in the top division and played all games at Scotiabank Place.

==== Schedule ====
All times are local (UTC−4).

2 April 2013; 19:30	Canada	v	United States	Scotiabank Place, Ottawa

3 April 2013; 19:30	Switzerland	v	Canada	Scotiabank Place, Ottawa

5 April 2013; 19:30	Canada	v	Finland	Scotiabank Place, Ottawa

==== Gold medal game ====
9 April 2013; 19:30	Canada	2–3 (1–0, 1–2, 0–1)	United States	Scotiabank Place, Ottawa; Attendance: 13,776

Game reference

Shannon Szabados
Goalies
Jessie Vetter
Referee:
(Germany) Nicole Hertrich
Linesmen:
(Czech Republic) Ilona Novotná
(Czech Republic) Zuzana Svobodová

C. Birchard (C. Ouellette, M.P. Poulin) – 09:50	1–0
	1–1	22:43 – B. Decker (K. Coyne)
	1–2	34:26 – M. Bozek (A. Schleper, K. Coyne) (PP2)
C. Ouellette (C. Ward, M.P. Poulin) (PP) – 37:50	2–2
	2–3	43:09 – A. Kessel (G. Marvin, J. Vetter)

12 min
Penalties
6 min
16
Shots
30

== Under 18 team ==
- August 12: Hockey Canada named the roster of the Canadian Under-18 team that played a three-game exhibition series in Blaine, Minnesota against the United States Under-18 squad from August 16 to 19, 2012. Four of the players on the roster were with the Under-18 program that won the gold medal at the 2012 IIHF Under 18 Worlds.

=== Exhibition ===
Date	Arena	Opponent	Final score	Goal scorers
August 16	Schwan Super Rink	United States	3-2	Nicole Martindale; Sydney McKibbon; Hannah Miller
August 17	Schwan Super Rink	United States	1-3	Hanna Bunton
August 19	Schwan Super Rink	United States	5-4 (SO)	Ashley Brykialiuk, Hannah Miller, Halli Krzyzaniak, Cassidy Carels

==== Roster ====
Number	Player	Position	Height	Province
1	Kimberly Newell	Goaltender	5'8"	British Columbia
31	Kassidy Sauvé	Goaltender	5'7"	Ontario
4	Emma Korbs	Defence	5'6"	Ontario
12	Catherine Daoust	Defence	5'5"	Quebec
15	Taryn Baumgardt	Defence	5'7"	Alberta
16	Alexa Ranahan	Defence	5'5"	British Columbia
18	Halli Krzyzaniak	Defence	5'7"	Manitoba
20	Sarah Steele	Defence	5'5"	Prince Edward Island
23	Sydney Smith	Defence	5'4"	Alberta
2	Cassidy Carels	Forward	5'5"	Manitoba
3	Karly Heffernan	Forward	5'7"	Alberta
6	Geneviève Bannon	Forward	5'7"	Quebec
7	Nicole Martindale	Forward	5'10"	Ontario
8	Eden Murray	Forward	5'3"	Alberta
9	Kristyn Capizzano	Forward	5'1"	Ontario
10	Sydney McKibbon	Forward	5'5"	Ontario
11	Hanna Bunton	Forward	5'8"	Ontario
13	Emily Clark	Forward	5'7"	Saskatchewan
14	Ashleigh Brykaliuk	Forward	5'7"	Manitoba
19	Hannah Miller	Forward	5'8"	British Columbia
21	Kennedy Ottenbreit-Daunheimer	Forward	5'7"	Saskatchewan
22	Catherine Dubois	Forward	5'9"	Quebec

== Under 22 team ==
- August 12: Hockey Canada named the roster of the Canadian Under-22 team that played a three-game exhibition series in Calgary against the United States Under-22 squad from August 16 to 19, 2012. Four of the players on the roster were with the Under-18 program that won the gold medal at the 2012 IIHF Under 18 Worlds.
- August 16: The Canadian Under-22 squad suffered their first loss to the United States in 13 games. The last win for the US came in Game 1 of a three game set in 2004.

=== Exhibition ===
Date	Arena	Opponent	Final score	Goal scorers
August 16	WinSport Canada Athletic & Ice Complex	United States	1-4	Nicole Kosta
August 17	WinSport Canada Athletic & Ice Complex	United States	2-4	Kelly Terry, Melodie Daoust
August 19	WinSport Canada Athletic & Ice Complex	United States	3-4	Melodie Daoust, Sarah Davis, Marie-Philip Poulin

==== Roster ====
Player	Position	Height	Province
Ann-Renee Desbiens	Goaltender	5'9	Quebec
Emerance Maschmeyer	Goaltender	5'6	Alberta
Sarah Edney	Defence	5'5	Ontario
Cassandra Poudrier	Defence	5'5	Quebec
Hayleigh Cudmore	Defence	5'4	Ontario
Shannon Doyle	Defence	5'4	Ontario
Brigette Lacquette	Defence	5'7	Manitoba
Erin Ambrose	Defence	5'5	Ontario
Laura Fortino	Defence	5'4	Ontario
Laura Stacey	Forward	5'10	Ontario
Jessica Campbell	Forward	5'5	Saskatchewan
Jillian Saulnier	Forward	5'5	Ontario
Kelly Terry	Forward	5'6	Ontario
Mélodie Daoust	Forward	5'6	Quebec
Sarah Lefort	Forward	5'7	Quebec
Nicole Kosta	Forward	5'5	Ontario
Jamie Lee Rattray	Forward	5'6	Ontario
Brianne Jenner	Forward	5'9	Ontario
Isabel Menard	Forward	5'6	Ontario
Sarah Davis	Forward	5'4	Newfoundland and Labrador
Shelby Bram	Forward	5'1	Manitoba
Marie-Philip Poulin	Forward	5'6	Quebec

== See also ==
- 2010–11 Canada women's national ice hockey team
- 2011–12 Canada women's national ice hockey team
- Canada women's national ice hockey team
