= 2007–08 New Hampshire Wildcats women's ice hockey season =

American college ice hockey team season

The New Hampshire Wildcats women's ice hockey team represented the University of New Hampshire. The Wildcats won the 2008 Hockey East championship and participated in the NCAA Frozen Four.

== Regular season ==
- Freshman Jennifer Wakefield finished second in New Hampshire scoring, but led all New Hampshire freshmen in scoring.
- During the 2007–08 season, Sam Faber of New Hampshire set an NCAA record (since tied) for most game winning goals in one season with 13.

== Awards and honors ==
- Jennifer Wakefield, Hockey East Rookie of the Year
- Jennifer Wakefield, Hockey East First All-Star Team
- Jennifer Wakefield, Hockey East All-Tournament Team
- Jennifer Wakefield, Hockey East All-Academic Team

== Postseason ==
New Hampshire lost in the NCAA semifinals to Minnesota-Duluth.
