= 2008–09 New Hampshire Wildcats women's ice hockey season =

American college ice hockey team season

The New Hampshire Wildcats women's ice hockey team represented the University of New Hampshire. The Wildcats participated in the NCAA tournament for the second consecutive season.

== Regular season ==
Jennifer Wakefield led New Hampshire in scoring. In addition, Wakefield led the Wildcats with 13 power play goals, four shorthanded goals and nine game-winning goals.

== Awards and honors ==
- Jennifer Wakefield, Top-10 finalist for the Patty Kazmaier Memorial Award
- Jennifer Wakefield, Hockey East Player of the Month in December 2008
- Jennifer Wakefield, Hockey East Player of the Month in April 2009

== Postseason ==
New Hampshire lost in the NCAA quarterfinals to Minnesota-Duluth.
