= 2011 4 Nations Cup =

International ice-hockey competition in Sweden

Tournament details
- Host country: Sweden
- Venues: 2 (in 2 host cities)
- Dates: 9–13 November
- Teams: 4

Final positions
- Champions: United States (4th title)
- Runners-up: Canada
- Third place: Sweden
- Fourth place: Finland

Tournament statistics
- Games played: 8
- Goals scored: 44 (5.5 per game)
- Scoring leader(s): Kendall Coyne and Kelli Stack (6 points)

The 2011 4 Nations Cup was a women's ice hockey tournament that was held in Nyköping, Sweden. All matches were held at the Stora Hallen arena. The November 10 match between Canada and the US marked the 100th time since 1990 that the two countries have played each other.

== Schedule ==
Date	Teams	Score	Notes
November 9	Canada vs. Finland	5–0	Shutout by Shannon Szabados
November 9	Sweden vs. USA	0–8	Hilary Knight was named the U.S. Player of the Game
November 10	Canada vs. USA	3–1	Game winning goal scored by Hayley Wickenheiser; Jocelyne Lamoureux was named the U.S. Player of the Game
November 10	Sweden vs. Finland	1–2	
November 12	Sweden vs. Canada	1–3	Jennifer Wakefield notched the game-winning goal
November 12	Finland vs. USA	0–10	Kendall Coyne was named the U.S. Player of the Game

== Medal round ==
=== Bronze medal game ===
Nov. 13	Finland	1–2	Sweden	Stora Hallen

=== Gold medal game ===
Nov. 13	Canada	3–4 (OT, SO)	United States	Stora Hallen

Shannon Szabados	Goalies	Jessie Vetter
Caroline Ouellette, Natalie Spooner (2) / Goals / Jenny Potter, Hilary Knight

== Rosters ==
- Canadian skaters Mélodie Daoust, Laura Fortino, Stefanie McKeough, Cassandra Poudrier and Lauriane Rougeau all suited up for Canada's National Women's Team for the first time in their respective careers.

=== Canada ===
Number	Name	Shoots	Height	Weight	Hometown	Club
1	Shannon Szabados	L	5 ft 8 in (173 cm)	147 lb (67 kg)	Edmonton, Alta.	Northern Alberta Institute of Technology
30	Christina Kessler	L	5 ft 6 in (168 cm)	139 lb (63 kg)	Mississauga, Ont.	Burlington Barracudas
32	Charline Labonté	L	5 ft 9 in (175 cm)	163 lb (74 kg)	Boisbriand, Que.	McGill Martlets
3	Jocelyne Larocque	L	5 ft 6 in (168 cm)	140 lb (64 kg)	Ste. Anne, Man.	Manitoba Maple Leafs
4	Stefanie McKeough	L	5 ft 7 in (170 cm)	146 lb (66 kg)	Carlsbad Springs, Ont.	Wisconsin Badgers
5	Lauriane Rougeau	L	5 ft 8 in (173 cm)	166 lb (75 kg)	Beaconsfield, Que.	Cornell Big Red
8	Laura Fortino	L	5 ft 4 in (163 cm)	144 lb (65 kg)	Hamilton, Ont.	Cornell Big Red
11	Courtney Birchard	L	5 ft 9 in (175 cm)	151 lb (68 kg)	Mississauga, Ont.	Brampton Thunder
14	Bobbi Jo Slusar	L	5 ft 4 in (163 cm)	140 lb (64 kg)	Swift Current, Sask.	Team Alberta (CWHL)
17	Cassandra Poudrier	L	5 ft 5 in (165 cm)	147 lb (67 kg)	Lachenaie, Que.	Dawson College
2	Meghan Agosta	L	5 ft 7 in (170 cm)	147 lb (67 kg)	Ruthven, Ont.	Montreal Stars
6	Rebecca Johnston	L	5 ft 9 in (175 cm)	145 lb (66 kg)	Sudbury, Ont.	Cornell Big Red
10	Gillian Apps	L	6 ft 0 in (183 cm)	177 lb (80 kg)	Unionville, Ont.	Brampton Thunder
16	Jayna Hefford	L	5 ft 5 in (165 cm)	138 lb (63 kg)	Kingston, Ont.	Brampton Thunder
19	Brianne Jenner	R	5 ft 9 in (175 cm)	159 lb (72 kg)	Oakville, Ont.	Cornell Big Red
20	Jennifer Wakefield	R	5 ft 10 in (178 cm)	166 lb (75 kg)	Pickering, Ont.	Boston University Terriers
21	Haley Irwin	L	5 ft 7 in (170 cm)	172 lb (78 kg)	Thunder Bay, Ont.	Minnesota Duluth Bulldogs
22	Hayley Wickenheiser	R	5 ft 10 in (178 cm)	171 lb (78 kg)	Shaunavon, Sask.	Calgary Dinos
23	Mélodie Daoust	L	5 ft 6 in (168 cm)	157 lb (71 kg)	Valleyfield, Que.	McGill Martlets
24	Natalie Spooner	R	5 ft 9 in (175 cm)	186 lb (84 kg)	Scarborough, Ont.	Ohio State Buckeyes
27	Jesse Scanzano	R	6 ft 0 in (183 cm)	188 lb (85 kg)	Montreal, Que.	Toronto Furies
28	Vicki Bendus	R	5 ft 2 in (157 cm)	110 lb (50 kg)	Wasaga Beach, Ont.	Brampton Thunder
29	Marie-Philip Poulin	L	5 ft 6 in (168 cm)	160 lb (73 kg)	Beauceville, Que.	Boston University Terriers

== Awards and honors ==
- Monique Lamoureux-Kolls, U.S. Player of the Game in Gold Medal match
- Kacey Bellamy, Best Defenseman
- Kelli Stack, Best Forward
- Jessie Vetter, Most Valuable Player
