= Geneviève Lacasse =

Canadian ice hockey player (born 1989)

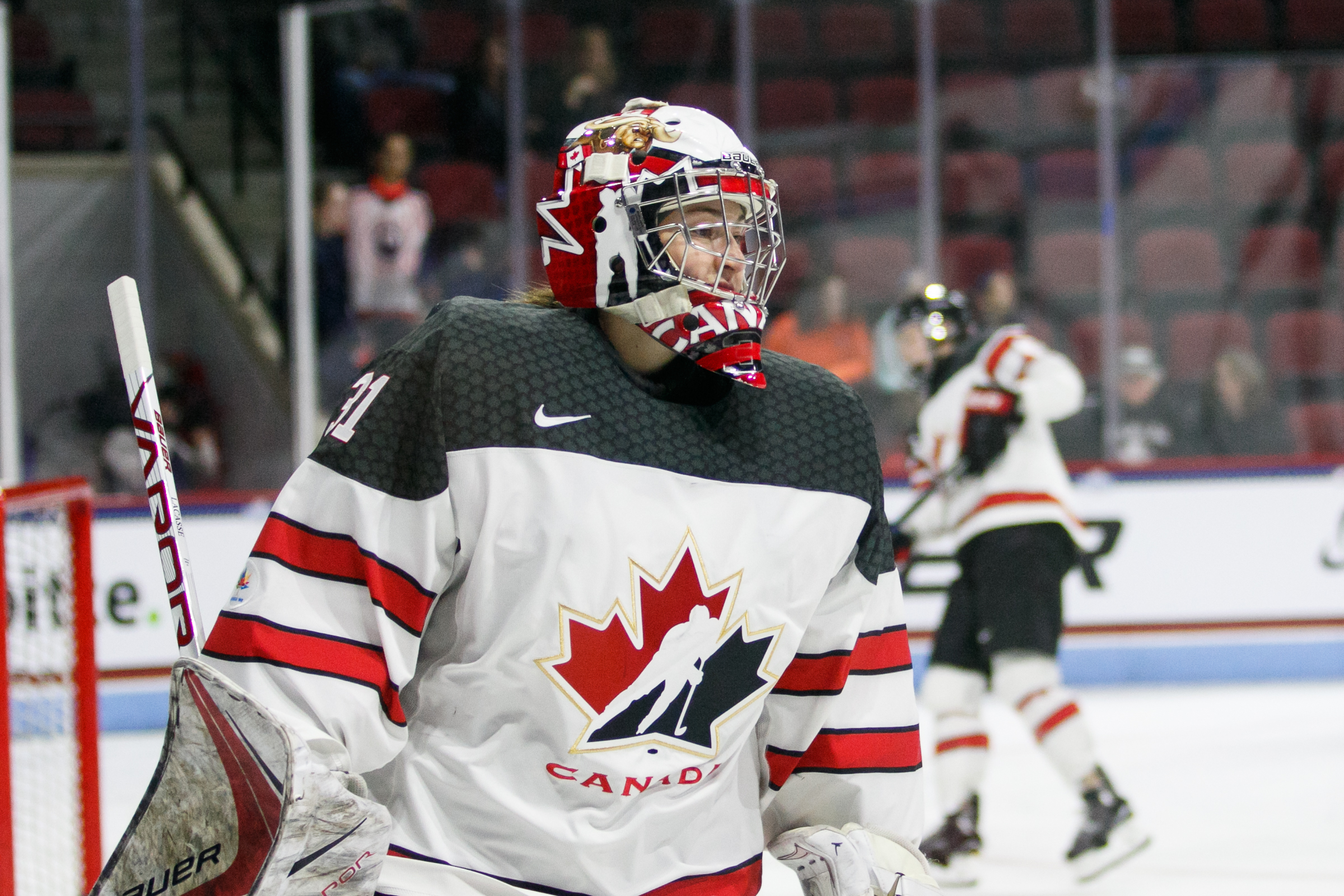
- Genevieve Lacasse playing for Team Canada in 2017
- Born: May 5, 1989 (age 37) Montreal, Quebec, Canada
- Height: 5 ft 8 in (173 cm)
- Weight: 152 lb (69 kg; 10 st 12 lb)
- Position: Goaltender
- Caught: Left
- Played for: Providence Friars; Boston Blades; Calgary Inferno; Les Canadiennes de Montréal; Montréal (PWHPA)
- National team: Canada
- Playing career: 2008–2023
Medal record
Olympic Games
Gold medal – first place	2014 Sochi	Team
Silver medal – second place	2018 Pyeongchang	Team
World Championships
Gold medal – first place	2012 United States
Silver medal – second place	2013 Canada
Silver medal – second place	2015 Sweden
Silver medal – second place	2017 United States
Bronze medal – third place	2019 Finland

Geneviève Lacasse (born May 5, 1989) is a Canadian former ice hockey goaltender who last played for the Montréal section of the Professional Women's Hockey Players Association (PWHPA). She is also a former member of the Canada women's national ice hockey team with whom she has won gold medals at both the Olympic Games and IIHF World Championships. In the Canadian Women's Hockey League (CWHL), she is a two-time Clarkson Cup winner. Lacasse was born in Montreal, Quebec.

== Education ==
Lacasse attended many high schools. In order of attendance: École Secondaire Catholique Marie-Rivier in Kingston, Ontario; College Charles-Lemoyne in Ville Ste-Catherine, Quebec; École secondaire de Mortagne in Boucherville, Quebec; Kingston Collegial and Vocational Institute in Kingston, Ontario; Lake Forest Academy in Chicago, Illinois; and graduated from Marian High School in Detroit, Michigan. Thereafter, she enrolled at Providence College where she completed her first bachelor's degree. Presently she is studying for a master's degree in marketing.

== Playing career ==
Lacasse won a bronze medal with the Kingston Ice Wolves at the OWHA provincial championship (Midget AA) in 2005. In 2007–08, Lacasse competed for Detroit Little Caesars (Midget AAA), and won a silver medal at the 2008 USA Nationals.

=== Providence ===
On October 29, 2010, Lacasse stopped 40 shots in a 2–2 tie against No. 5 Boston University, including three in overtime. The goalie made several quality saves, including on a partial breakaway in the first period by Terrier Jenn Wakefield. She stopped 14 shots in the opening period and 13 in the third frame.

During October 2010, Lacasse had a 1.64 GAA and a .949 save percentage. These numbers were complemented by two shutouts. In addition, she accumulated a league-high 281 saves. In two games, she had over 40 saves. For the week beginning January 14, 2011, Lacasse made a total of 86 saves (.977 save%) in wins against No. 7 Boston College and No. 9 Northeastern. On January 19, she matched a career-best 51 stops against the Eagles at Schneider Arena. The Friars penalty kill was a perfect 7-for-7 during the two matches. On March 5, 2011, Lacasse would break the record set by Florence Schelling earlier in the day for most saves in a Hockey East tournament game with 58.

On January 28 and 29, 2012, Lacasse stopped 51 of 53 shots in a Friars sweep of the Connecticut Huskies. With the two victories, Lacasse surpassed Jana Bugden as the Friars all-time wins leader with 59. Her shutout on January 28 was the 17th of her Friars career, a new record. On Friday, February 17, 2012, Providence skated to a 0–0 tie against the #7 Northeastern Huskies. The Friars have clinched at least fourth-place in the Hockey East standings, with home ice advantage for quarterfinal play. Both goaltenders, Genevieve Lacasse of Providence and Florence Schelling of Northeastern stopped 80 shots combined through three periods and overtime. Lacasse stopped 42 shots while Schelling logged 38 stops. With the shutout, Lacasse earned the 18th of her NCAA career, a Providence school record.

Following the 2012 Hockey East tournament, Lacasse was named to the All-Tournament Team after playing over 179 minutes of playoff hockey without allowing a goal. Upon graduation, Lacasse set Providence College recordsin four categories. Said categories included: victories (64), games (127), saves (3,482) and shutouts (20).

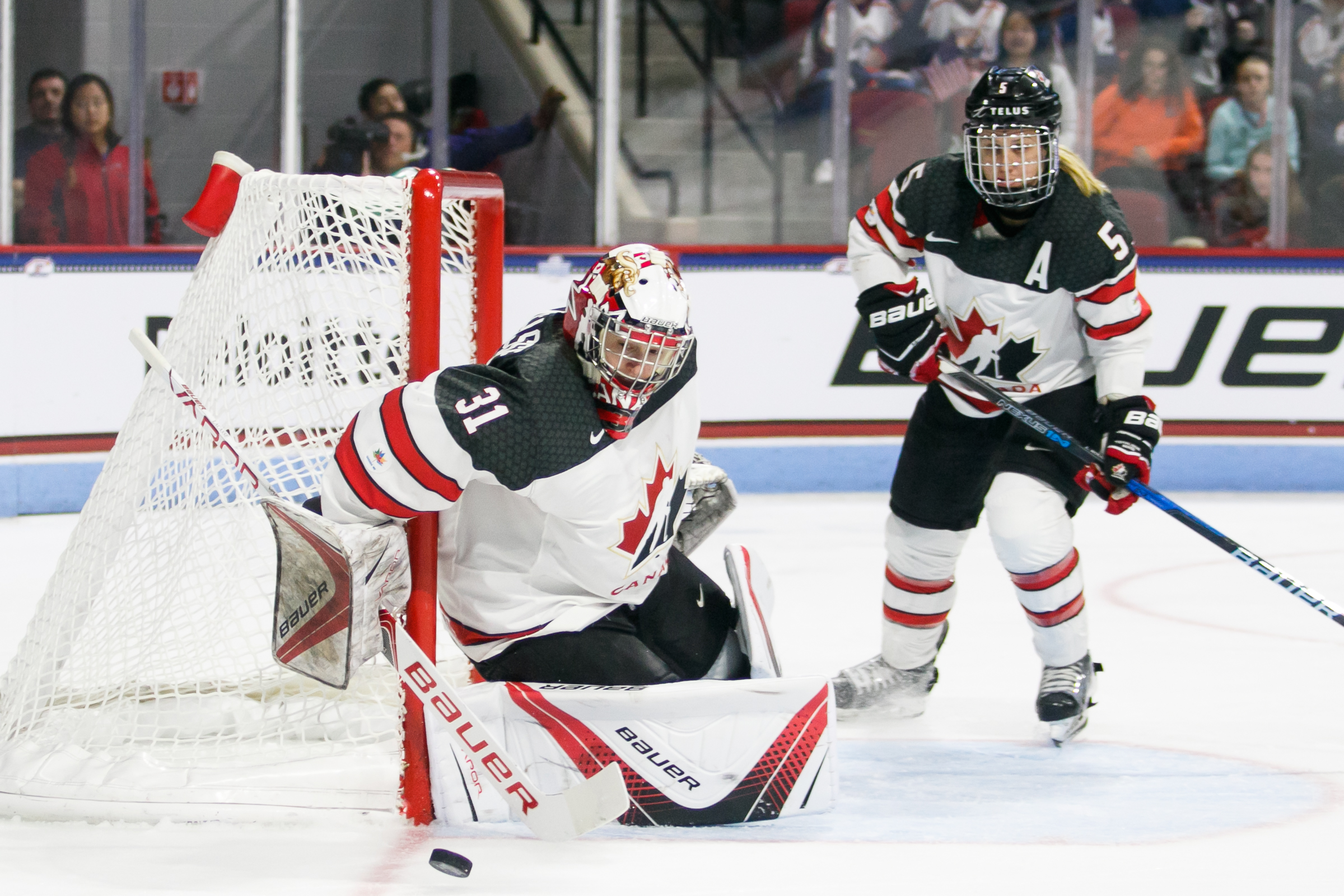
Genevieve Lacasse making a save for Team Canada in 2017

=== Hockey Canada ===
Lacasse was named to Canada's 2014 Olympic roster. In the 2011 MLP Cup, Lacasse earned a shutout in a 5–0 defeat of Switzerland on January 4. Prior to the match, she had made 57 consecutive starts for the Friars. Lacasse earned a shutout in the gold medal game of the 2011 MLP Cup, as Canada prevailed over Sweden by a 6–0 mark. In the third game of the 2011 IIHF Eight Nations Tournament, Lacasse earned a shutout in an 11–0 triumph over Slovakia. By being named to the Team Canada roster for the 2012 IIHF Women's Worlds, Lacasse became the 19th skater from Providence to compete in the World Championships, while being the first to dress for Team Canada.

=== Boston Blades ===
During the 2012–13 CWHL season, Lacasse was the regular season goaltending champion. For her efforts, she would win the CWHL Most Outstanding Goaltender Award. In the postseason, she would help the Boston Blades become the 2013 Clarkson Cup champions.

On August 27, 2016, the Calgary Inferno acquired Lacasse from the Boston Blades, completing the trade that sent Tara Watchorn to the Blades in the summer of 2014.

=== Les Canadiennes de Montreal ===
On July 12, 2018, Lacasse was acquired by Les Canadiennes de Montreal, along with forward Jillian Saulnier.

In September 2023, Lacasse announced her retirement from professional hockey and joined PWHL's front office.

== Personal life ==
Lacasse married former international teammate and Vancouver Goldeneyes goaltender Emerance Maschmeyer in the summer of 2023. On September 8, 2024, Lacasse and Maschmeyer had their first child, a son named Beckham.

== Career statistics ==
=== International career ===
Year	Team	Event	Result	GP	W	L	T/OT	MIN	GA	SO	GAA	SV%
2018	Canada	OG	2nd place, silver medalist(s)	1	1	0	0	60:00	1	0	1.00	0.978

== Awards and honours ==
- Hockey East rookie of the year in 2008–09
- Hockey East Second All-Star Team in 2008–09
- Hockey East All-Rookie Team in 2008–09
- Hockey East Co-Defensive Player of the Week (Week of November 1, 2010)
- Hockey East Goaltender of the Month (October 2010)
- Hockey East Player of the Week (Week of January 24, 2011)
- Hockey East Defensive Player of the Week (Week of February 14)
- Runner-up, Hockey East Goaltender of the Month (December 2010)
- 2011 Providence Team MVP
- Providence Hockey East All-Decade Team
- Hockey East Defensive Player of the Week (Week of January 31, 2011)
- 2012 New England Hockey Writer's All-Star selection
- 2012 Hockey East Second-Team All-Star
- 2012 Hockey East All-Tournament team

=== CWHL ===
- 2014–15 CWHL Second All-Star Team
- 2013 Clarkson Cup Top Goaltender
- 2013 Clarkson Cup All-Star Team
- 2012–13 CWHL Goaltender of the Year Award
- 2012–13 CWHL First All-Star Team
- 2012–13 CWHL All-Rookie Team
