= Tina Enström =

Swedish ice hockey player

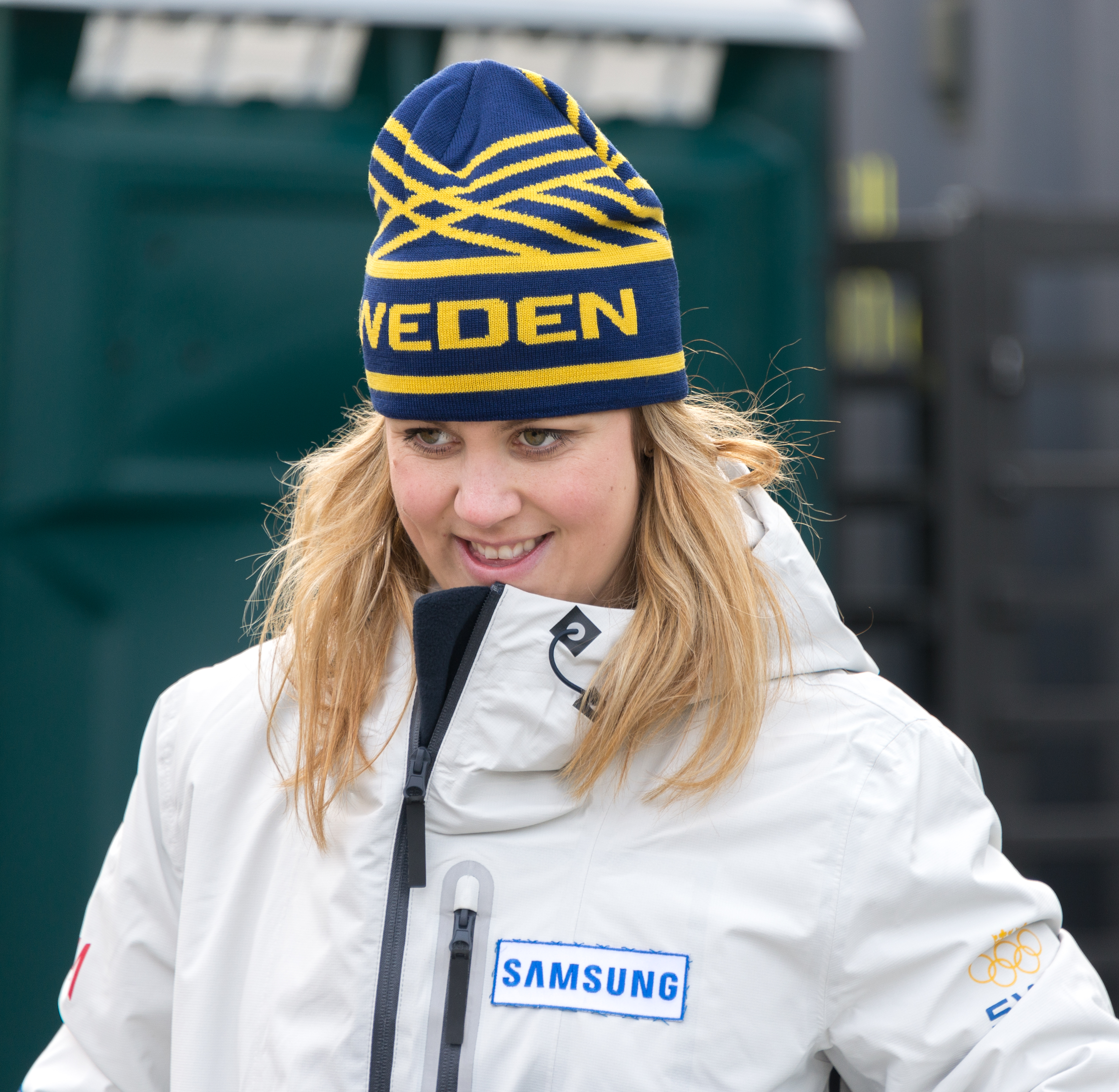
- Born: 23 March 1991 (age 35) Nordingrå, Sweden
- Height: 164 cm (5 ft 5 in)
- Weight: 65 kg (143 lb; 10 st 3 lb)
- Position: Center
- Shot: Left
- Played for: Modo Hockey; Djurgårdens IF; Linköping HC
- National team: Sweden
- Playing career: 2007–2017
Medal record
Women's ice hockey
Representing Sweden
IIHF World Women's Championships
Bronze medal – third place	2007 Canada	Tournament
Women's MLP Cup
Gold medal – first place	2011 Switzerland	Tournament

Tina Linnéa Enström (born 23 March 1991) is a Swedish retired ice hockey player from Örnsköldsvik, Sweden. She played forward position for the Sweden women's national ice hockey team.

== Playing career ==
She played with the MODO Örnskoldsvik in the Riksserien (Sweden league elite).

On June 8, 2011, it was announced that Enstrom (and Swedish national teammate Erika Grahm) would join the Bulldogs for the 2011–12 Minnesota–Duluth Bulldogs women's ice hockey season. However, she never attended UMD.

=== International career ===
She won the bronze medal at the 2007 Women's World Ice Hockey Championships in Winnipeg, Manitoba, Canada.

== Personal life ==
She is the sister of retired NHL and SHL player Tobias Enström.
