= Jenelle Kohanchuk =

Canadian ice hockey player

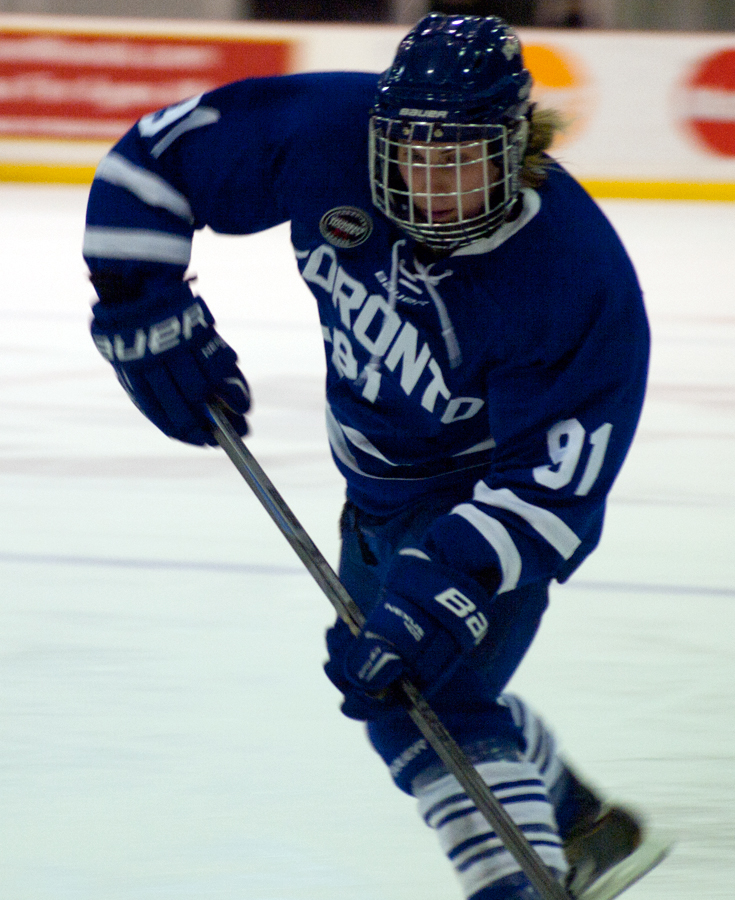
- Born: October 3, 1990 (age 36) Winnipeg, Manitoba, Canada
- Height: 5 ft 7 in (170 cm)
- Weight: 143 lb (65 kg; 10 st 3 lb)
- Position: Forward
- Shoots: Left
- Hockey East CWHL team: Boston University; Toronto Furies(2013-2017)
- National team: Canada
- Playing career: 2005–present

Jenelle Kohanchuk
Medal record

Women's ice hockey

Representing Canada

MLP Nations Cup
Gold medal – first place	2010 Germany	2011 Tournament
Gold medal – first place	2011 Germany	2011 Tournament

Women's 4 Nations Cup
Gold medal – first place	2014 Canada	Tournament

Jenelle Kohanchuk (born October 3, 1990) was an ice hockey forward for the Boston University Terriers women's ice hockey program. She would compete for the Toronto Furies squad that captured the 2014 Clarkson Cup. She is a current player for Team Bauer (Boston) for the PWHPA (2021–22).

== Playing career ==
Kohanchuk participated in the 2006 Mac's Midget Tournament with Balmoral Hall. The following year, she competed in the tournament with Notre Dame. She won a bronze medal with Manitoba at the 2007 National Women's Under-18 Championship. In the same year, she was part of the Female Midget AAA Hockey League championship with the Notre Dame Hounds. With Notre Dame, she was part of the gold medal victory at the 2007 Western Shield, where she was named top forward and MVP. At the 2007 Canada Winter Games in Whitehorse, Yukon, Kohanchuk won a silver medal with Team Manitoba. In 2007–08, Kohanchuk ranked second in scoring with the Balmoral Hall Blazers. In 2008, she won a gold medal at the Balmoral Hall tournament in 2008

=== NCAA ===
In 2008, she joined the Boston Terriers women's ice hockey program. She was named to the Hockey East all-rookie team and was named top rookie at the Hockey East championship in 2008–09. In the same season, she led the Terriers in scoring and was the co-leader among all Hockey East freshmen. The following season, she finished fifth on the Terriers scoring list in 2009–10, leading all sophomores. She was part of the Terriers squad that won its first-ever Hockey East championship in 2010. In addition, she participated with the Hockey East All-Stars in a game against the United States’ Women's National Team on Nov. 22, 2009. She was in the Frozen Four in 2011, 2012, and 2013.

=== Hockey Canada ===
Kohanchuk's first experience with Hockey Canada came when she attended Canada's National Women's Under-22 Team selection camp in Toronto, Ont., in August 2008. On two separate occasions, she was a member of Canada's National Women's Under-22 Team for a three-game series vs. the United States. The first series occurred in Calgary, Alberta in August 2009 while the second was in Toronto, Ontario in August 2010. In addition, Kohanchuk won three gold medal's with Canada's National Women's Under-22 Team at the 2010, 2011, and 2012 MLP Cup in Ravensburg, Germany. She scored one of the six goals in the gold medal game of the 2011 MLP Cup. Kohanchuk was Centralized for the 2013/2014 Sochi Roster, but was one of the six players released from the final roster. In that year she won Gold with the National team at the 2013 Four Nations Cup, capturing 2 Goals and an assist in the gold medal game. The following year in Kamploops, she won another Gold at the Four Nations Cup, defeating Team USA in a shoot-out.

== Career stats ==
=== Hockey Canada ===
Year	Event	GP	G	A	PTS
2009	U22 Selection camp	2	0	0	0
2010	MLP Cup	4	0	3	3
2010	Exhibition Series (vs. USA)	3	0	1	1
2011	MECO CUP	4	2	1	3
2013	4 NATIONS CUP	4	2	1	3
2014	4 NATIONS CUP	4	0	1	1
2016	4 NATIONS CUP	4	0	1	1

=== NCAA ===
Year	GP	G	A	PTS	PIM
2008-09	28	15	16	31	28
2009-10	27	12	9	21	16
2010-11	36	10	21	31	30
2012-13	35	19	36	55	18

== Awards and honours ==
- 2009 Hockey East all-rookie team
