= Vicki Bendus =

Canadian professional ice hockey player

- Born: April 17, 1989 (age 37) Wasaga Beach, Ontario, Canada
- Height: 5 ft 2 in (157 cm)
- Weight: 110 lb (50 kg; 7 st 12 lb)
- Position: Forward
- Shoots: Right
- Played for: Brampton Thunder
- National team: Canada
- Playing career: 2007–present
Medal record
Representing Canada
Women's ice hockey
IIHF World Women's Championships
Gold medal – first place	2012 United States	Tournament
Women's 4 Nations Cup
Gold medal – first place	2010 Canada	Tournament
Gold medal – first place	2013 United States	Tournament
Silver medal – second place	2011 Sweden	Tournament
Women's MLP Cup
Gold medal – first place	2011 Switzerland	Tournament

Vicki Bendus (born April 17, 1989) is a Canadian professional ice hockey player who last played for the Brampton Thunder of the Canadian Women's Hockey League (CWHL). While playing collegiate hockey with the Mercyhurst Lakers, she won the 2010 Patty Kazmaier Award, awarded to the top player in women's NCAA hockey. She was also selected for the Canadian national women's team that will compete in the 2010 Four Nations Cup. Bendus was the leading scorer at the 2011 MLP Cup.

Since 2016, Bendus has worked as a coach for Canada's National Women's Under-18 Team.

== Playing career ==
Bendus began playing hockey with the Etobicoke Dolphins of the Provincial Women's Hockey League at the age of 16. She attracted the attention of Mercyhurst University while leading the Aurora Panthers in scoring the following season.

=== Mercyhurst ===
- During the 2008–09 Mercyhurst Lakers women's ice hockey season, Bendus was named assistant captain. She had a seven-game point scoring streak from Nov. 14 through Dec. 12, and registered four multiple-point contests and two game-winners during that span. She recorded a goal in four straight games from Nov. 21 through Dec. 6. From Feb. 13 through Feb. 27, she recorded 10 assists in five-game span.
- On March 13, 2010, Bendus scored the 50th career goal of her career in the win over the Boston University Terriers. She is now the 8th Laker to have at least 50 goals in a career.
- In addition, Bendus is also a member of the Mercyhurst women's golf team. In the 2008-09 golf season, she helped the Lakers get to NCAA Division I Golf national final.

=== Hockey Canada ===
Bendus won a gold medal at the Canada Winter Games with Team Ontario in 2007. On January 10, 2010, Bendus scored a goal and added two assists for the Canadian national women's under-22 team in the gold medal game of the 2010 MLP Cup. Canada defeated Switzerland, 9-0 in Ravensburg, Germany. The Canadian team won all four of their games by a combined score of 24-4, and secured their seventh goal medal in the past eight years. In three games, Bendus, Jesse Scanzano and Bailey Bram (from the Mercyhurst Lakers women's ice hockey team) combined for seven goals and 18 points. Benuds and Bram were tied for the tournament lead in scoring, and Bendus was named the tournament's top forward.

On October 6, 2010, Bendus was selected to play for the National Women's Team that will play in the 2010 Four Nations Cup. Bendus scored one of the six goals in the gold medal game of the 2011 MLP Cup. In addition, she was the captain of the team. She travelled to Bratislava, Slovakia to participate in the 2011 IIHF High Performance Women's Camp from July 4–12. In the third game of the 2011 IIHF Eight Nations Tournament, Bendus registered a hat trick and added one assist in an 11-0 shoutout over Slovakia.

Bendus won gold with Team Canada at the 2012 IIHF Women's World Championship. She was invited to try out for Team Canada's 2014 Winter Olympics roster but failed to make the final cut. After she was cut, Bendus began studying at Brock University for her master's degree in applied health sciences and kinesiology.

=== CWHL ===
In the 2011 CWHL Draft, she was selected fourth overall by the Brampton Thunder.

=== Coaching ===
In 2016, Hockey Canada asked Bendus to coach their under-18 female hockey program. At the time, she was also working at Brock University as a Sports Performance Coach. In 2017, she was named a strength and conditioning coach for Canada's National Women's Under-18 Team.

As a coach, she helped Team Canada win an IIHF World Championship, becoming one of the few women to win one both as a player and a coach.

== Career stats ==
=== Mercyhurst ===
Year	Games Played	Goals	Assists	Points	Power Play Goals	Short Handed Goals
2007-08	37	11	21	32	3	1
2008-09	37	11	30	41	4	2
2009-10	36	28	37	65	8	5
2010-11	30	19	33	52	6	1

=== Hockey Canada ===
Year	Games Played	Goals	Assists	Points	Penalty Minutes	Power Play Goals
2010 Four Nations Cup	4	2	5	7	0	1

== See also ==
- 2009–10 Mercyhurst Lakers women's ice hockey season

== Awards and honours ==
=== CHA Player of the Week ===
- CHA Player of the Week (October 6, 2009)
- CHA Player of the Week (November 30, 2009)
- CHA Player of the Week (January 4, 2010)
- CHA Player of the Week (January 18, 2010)
- CHA Player of the Week (Week of December 6, 2010)

=== CHA awards ===
- 2010 CHA Player of the Year
- 2009-10 Pre-Season All-CHA Team
- 2009-10 CHA Scoring champion
- 2010 All-CHA First Team
- 2010-11 First Team All-CHA selection

=== NCAA awards ===
- NCAA leader, 2009-10 season, Short handed goals (tied), 5
- 2010 Patty Kazmaier Award
- Vicki Bendus, 2010 NCAA Elite 88 Award (awarded to student-athlete with the highest grade point average participating at an NCAA Championship event)
- 2010 Women's RBK Hockey Division I All-America Team
- 2011 Patty Kazmaier Award Nominee

=== Other ===
- Top Forward, 2010 MLP Cup
- June 2010: First Team CoSIDA / ESPN The Magazine Academic All-American

Awards and achievements
Preceded by Jessie Vetter	Patty Kazmaier Award; 2009–10	Succeeded by Meghan Duggan
