= Stefanie McKeough =

Canadian ice hockey player and coach

- Born: January 27, 1991 (age 34) Carlsbad Springs, Ontario, Canada
- Height: 5 ft 6 in (168 cm)
- Weight: 139 lb (63 kg; 9 st 13 lb)
- Position: Defence
- Shot: Left
- Played for: Wisconsin Badgers; Ottawa Lady Senators
- Current PWHL coach: Boston Fleet
- Coached for: Göteborg HC Ottawa Gee-Gees
- National team: Canada
- Playing career: 2007–2014
- Coaching career: 2018–present

Stefanie McKeough (born January 27, 1991) is a Canadian retired ice hockey player, currently serving as assistant coach to the Boston Fleet in the Professional Women's Hockey League (PWHL) and assistant coach to Canada's National Women's Under-18 Team. She previously served as both assistant and head coach to the Ottawa Gee-Gees women's ice hockey program in the Réseau du sport étudiant du Québec (RSEQ) of U Sports, and head coach of Göteborg HC in the Swedish Women's Hockey League (SDHL). During her playing career, she competed for the Canadian national team at several international tournaments and played with the Wisconsin Badgers in the NCAA.

== Playing career ==
McKeough won the 2008 PWHL Championship with the Ottawa Capitals (now called Senators) of the Provincial Women's Hockey League (PWHL). In addition, she was named Most Valuable Player of her high school team at St. Mark Catholic High School for three consecutive seasons. She helped her high school win two city of Ottawa championships.

=== Hockey Canada ===
Medal record

Women's ice hockey

Representing Canada

World U18 Championship
Silver medal – second place	2009 Germany	

MLP Nations Cup
Gold medal – first place	2011 Switzerland	

McKeough was part of the 2008–09 National Women's Under-18 Team that claimed the silver medal at the 2009 IIHF World Women's U-18 Championship. Two of her teammates on that team also played with her on the Wisconsin Badgers: Saige Pacholok and Breann Frykas.

During the summer of 2011, she was one of eight former Ottawa Senators PWHL players (along with Amanda Leveille, Morgan Richardson, Cydney Roesler: U-18 camp; Jamie Lee Rattray, Isabel Menard and Erica Howe: U22 camp) that participated in the Hockey Canada Under 18 and Under 22 training camps at the Canadian International Hockey Academy in Rockland, Ontario. On October 3, 2011, she was named to the Team Canada roster that participated in the 2011 4 Nations Cup.

=== NCAA ===
McKeough joined the Wisconsin Badgers in the 2009–10 season. On February 12, 2010, she scored her first NCAA goal in a game versus Minnesota State. Against the Robert Morris Colonials, McKeough had two assists (played on November 7). She repeated the feat on January 23 versus St. Cloud State. Her plus minus rating of +25 led the Badgers.

During the 2010–11 season, McKeough had five games with two points scored. Versus the Ohio State Buckeyes (on October 22), she scored two goals as Wisconsin beat Ohio State by a 6-5 tally in overtime. McKeough would miss four games during the season as she helped Canada win gold at the 2011 MLP Cup. In the championship game of the 2011 Frozen Four, McKeough would notch an assist as the Badgers claimed the Frozen Four title.

== Career stats ==
=== NCAA ===
Year	GP	G	A	PTS	PIM	+/-
2009-10	36	1	14	15	37	+25
2010-11	37	3	16	19	10	+34

=== WCHA ===
Year	GP	G	A	PTS	PIM	+/-
2009-10	28	1	10	11	31	+18
2010-11	28	3	8	11	6	+22

=== Hockey Canada ===
Event	GP	G	A	PTS	PIM
2008 National Under 18	5	0	0	0	2

== Awards and honours ==
- 2009-10 All-WCHA Rookie Team
- 2009-10 All-WCHA Third Team (2009–10)
- 2010-11 All-WCHA Academic Team
- Wisconsin Badgers Defensive Player of the Year (2011–12, 2010–11, 2009–10)

== Coaching career ==
McKeough took an assistant coaching role with Göteborg HC in 2018. The team plays in the Svenska damhockeyligan (SDHL), which is the top division of women's hockey in Sweden. After two seasons as an assistant, she took over as head coach of the team. In October 2020, her first season as head coach, McKeough resigned and came back to Canada. She was hired by the University of Ottawa Gee-Gees as an assistant coach for the women's hockey team in November. In 2022, during her second season with the Gee-Gees, she was selected to be an assistant coach of Canada’s National Women’s Under-18 Team. She was part of the first all-women coaching staff in the program's history. Gee-Gees head coach Chelsea Grills stepped down after the 2022-23 U-SPORTS season, and McKeough was then appointed head coach of the program. For the second time in her brief coaching career, McKeough would step down from a head coaching role in the month of October. This time, she was hired to be an assistant coach for PWHL Boston before their inaugural season. McKeough also continues to coach for the U-18 program.
