= Bodensee Arena =

Sports venue in Kreuzlingen, Switzerland

Coordinates: 47.6547°N 9.180°E

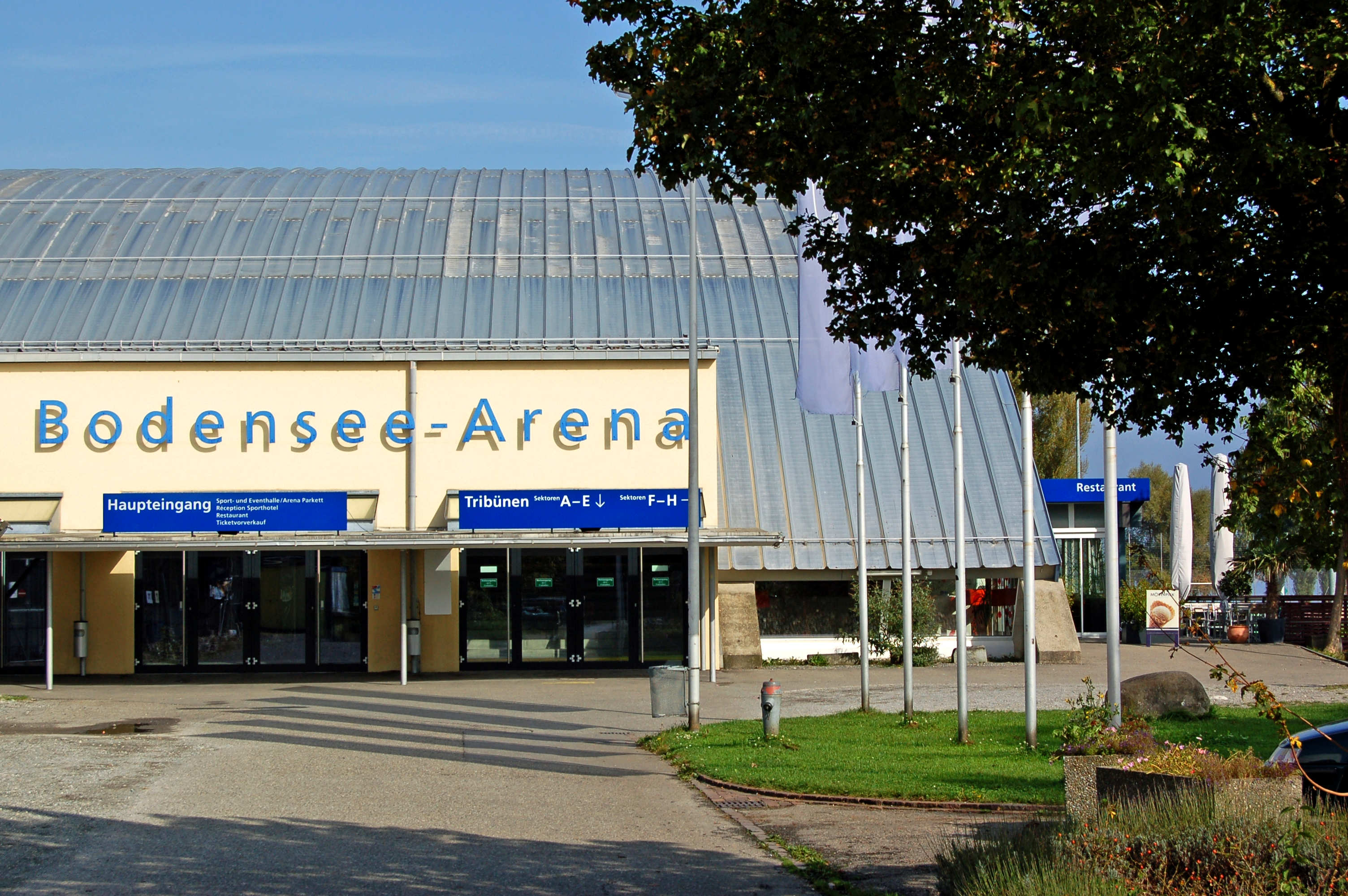
Bodensee Arena

Bodensee Arena is an arena in Kreuzlingen, Switzerland. It is primarily used for ice hockey and is the home arena of HC Thurgau and EHC Kreuzlingen-Konstanz. Bodensee Arena opened in 2000 and holds 4,000 people.
