= Lauriane Rougeau =

Canadian ice hockey player

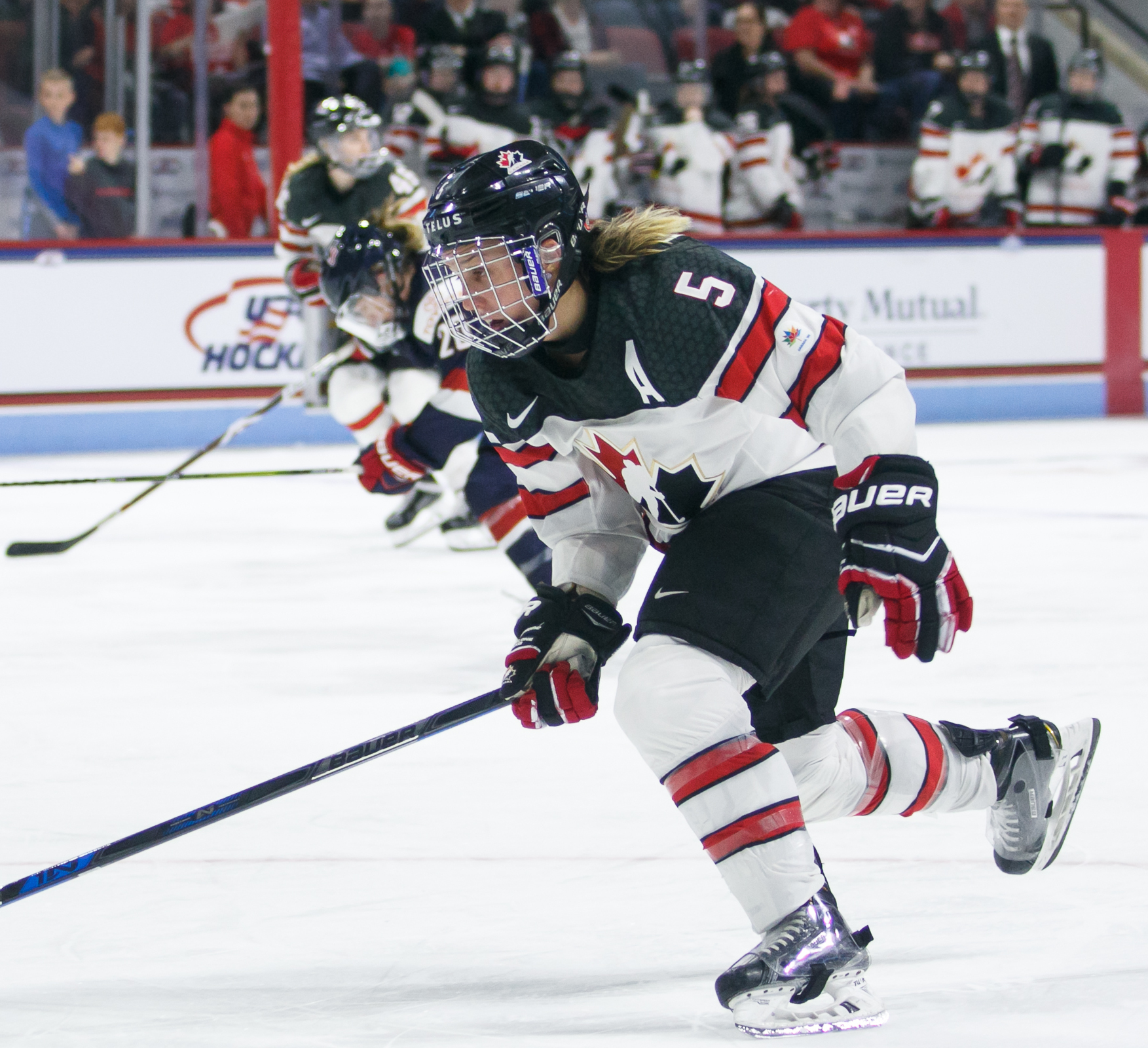
- Lauriane Rougeau playing for Team Canada in 2017
- Born: April 12, 1990 (age 36) Pointe-Claire, Quebec, Canada
- Height: 5 ft 8 in (173 cm)
- Weight: 168 lb (76 kg; 12 st 0 lb)
- Position: Defence
- Shoots: Left
- Played for: PWHL Toronto; PWHPA; Les Canadiennes de Montreal; Dawson; Cornell
- National team: Canada
- Playing career: 2007–present
Medal record
Olympic Games
Gold medal – first place	2014 Sochi	Team
Silver medal – second place	2018 Pyeongchang	Team
World Championships
Gold medal – first place	2012 United States
Silver medal – second place	2013 Canada
Silver medal – second place	2015 Sweden
Silver medal – second place	2016 Canada
Silver medal – second place	2017 United States
World U18 Championships
Silver medal – second place	2008 Canada

Lauriane Rougeau (born April 12, 1990) is a Canadian former professional ice hockey player. Prior to retirement, she played for PWHL Toronto during the inaugural season of the Professional Women's Hockey League (PWHL). She played college ice hockey at Cornell, where she is a former All-American selection. She was part of the Montreal Stars team that captured the inaugural Clarkson Cup in 2009. Competing in Ice hockey at the 2014 Winter Olympics, she was part of Canada's gold medal triumph. Having also earned a gold medal at the 2012 IIHF Women's World Championship, she is among a rare group of Canadian female hockey players that have won the Clarkson Cup, IIHF World Gold and Winter Games gold.

== Playing career ==
Rougeau played midget hockey for the Lac St. Louis Tigres. In 2002, she won a gold medal at the Atom AA Quebec Provincials while playing with the Lakeshore Panthers. Three years later, she won a silver medal with Quebec at the 2005 National Women's Under-18 Championships.

In 2005, Rougeau was part of the team that took first place at the Québec Atom AA championships. Her team also took first place at the 2005 Jeux du Québec.

At the 2007 Canada Winter Games, Rougeau won the bronze with Quebec. In the same year, she represented Quebec at the National Women's Under-18 Championship and was awarded a silver medal.

=== Ligue de hockey féminin collégial AA ===
In 2007–08, Rougeau factored in the Cheminots du Cégep St-Jérôme winning the Collégial AA championship with a perfect 27–0 record. The following year, she helped Dawson Blues to a 31–1 record and a runner-up finish in the Collégial AA playoffs of 2008–09. For the season, she led Dawson defenders in scoring. Dawson competed in the 2009 Junior Women's Hockey League Challenge Cup in Washington, D.C., and Rougeau helped the team win the tournament.

=== NCAA ===
Rougeau joined Cornell in 2009 and was named an NCAA Second Team All-American and Ivy League Rookie of the Year. She ranked second among Cornell defenders and freshmen in scoring in 2009–10. Rougeau ranked third overall in Cornell scoring in 2009–10. As a rookie, she was part of the Cornell team that played in the NCAA championship game at the 2010 Frozen Four, but were defeated by the Minnesota Duluth Bulldogs.

=== CWHL ===
Despite playing minor hockey, Rougeau was part of the Montreal Axion which had a runner-up finish in the 2006–07 NWHL season. In 2009, she competed for the Montreal Stars and was part of a Clarkson Cup victory.

=== Hockey Canada ===
Rougeau assisted on the first goal in the history of the Canadian National Women's Under 18 program (on August 23, 2007 in Ottawa, Ontario). The goal would be scored by future Cornell teammate Catherine White. In addition, she was team captain for that game. She was captain once more, as part of Canada's National Women's Under-18 Team as they won a silver medal at the 2008 IIHF World Women's Under-18 Championships. She was recognized as Top Defender.

She would compete with Canada's National Women's Under-22 Team in 2008 as part of a three-game series vs. the United States in Pierrefonds, Quebec. In August 2009, she would play for the team for another three game series against the US (this time in Calgary, Alberta). The following year, she would participate in another series vs. the US (contested in Toronto, Ontario).

Rougeau competed in the MLP Cup on three separate occasions. She won a silver medal at the 2009 MLP Cup in Ravensburg, the gold medal at the 2010 and 2011 MLP Cup, respectively. On October 3, 2011, she was named to the Team Canada roster that will participate in the 2011 4 Nations Cup. In a game versus Russia at the 2012 IIHF Women's World Championship, Rougeau logged a goal and an assist in a 14–1 victory.

=== PWHL ===
After going undrafted in the 2023 PWHL Draft, Rougeau signed with PWHL Toronto following their 2023 training camp. On January 20, 2024, she scored the winning goal in the PWHL's first shootout. Rougeau was expected to try out for the team at the 2024 training camp, but instead announced her retirement from playing.

== Post-playing career ==
Following her retirement, Rougeau was named Manager of Hockey Operations for the Toronto Sceptres.

== Career statistics ==
=== Hockey Canada ===
Year	Event	GP	G	A	PTS
2007	U18 vs. USA	3	1	2	3
2008	U18 Exhibition	1	0	1	1
2008	U18 Worlds	5	0	4	4
2008	U22 vs. USA	3	1	2	3
2009	MLP Cup	4	0	1	1
2009	U22 Selection Camp	2	0	0	0
2010	MLP Cup	5	0	1	1
2010	U22 vs. USA	3	0	3	3

=== NCAA ===
Year	GP	G	A	PTS	PIM
2009–10	33	10	22	32	38
2010–11	14	0	11	11	6

== Awards and honours ==
- Collégial AA Rookie of the Year (2007–08)
- Collégial AA First All-Star Team in 2007–08
- Collégial AA First All-Star Team in 2008–09
- Collegial AA Academic All-Star, 2008–09
- Quill and Dagger Senior Honor Society, Cornell University

=== IIHF ===
- Directorate Award, Best Defender, 2008 IIHF Under 18 Women's World Championships

=== NCAA ===
- Ivy League Rookie of the Year in 2009–10
- RBK Hockey/AHCA Women's Division I 2009–10 Second Team All-American
- Finalist, 2010 ECAC Best Defensive Defenseman Award
- 2010–11 All-ECAC First Team
- 2011 Second Team All-America selection
- 2010–11 Second Team All-Ivy
