= Stefanie Wyss =

Swiss ice hockey defender (born 1985)

- Born: October 19, 1985 (age 39); Bern, Switzerland
- Height: 5 ft 5 in (165 cm)
- Weight: 128 lb (58 kg; 9 st 2 lb)
- Position: Defence
- Shoots: Left
- National team: Switzerland
- Playing career: 2007–present

Stefanie Eva Wyss (born 19 October 1985, Bern, Switzerland) is a Swiss ice hockey defender.

== International career ==
Wyss was selected for the Switzerland national women's ice hockey team in the 2010 Winter Olympics. She played in all five games recording no point.

Wyss has also represented Switzerland in three IIHF Women's World Championships, making her debut in 2007.

== Career statistics ==
=== International career ===
Year	Team	Event	GP	G	A	Pts	PIM
2007	Switzerland	WW	4	0	0	0	4
2008	Switzerland	WW	5	0	0	0	2
2010	Switzerland	Oly	5	1	2	3	4
2011	Switzerland	WW	5	0	0	0	0
