= Angelica Östlund =

Swedish ice hockey player (born 1991)

- Born: 5 July 1991 (age 34); Mehedeby, Sweden
- Height: 163 cm (5 ft 4 in)
- Weight: 62 kg (137 lb; 9 st 11 lb)
- Position: Centre
- Shot: Left
- Played for: Brynäs IF
- National team: Sweden
- Playing career: 2004–2018

Angelica Östlund (born 5 July 1991) is a Swedish bandy player and former professional ice hockey forward. She is the all-time leading scorer for Brynäs IF Dam of the Swedish Women's Hockey League (SDHL) and served as the club's captain from 2013 to 2018. Östlund participated in 38 matches with the Swedish national team.

== Career ==
Östlund attended her first hockey match at the age of two, watching Brynäs IF play in the Elitserien. In 2004, she began playing for the club's women's team.

In 2009, she was named an assistant captain for the club in 2009, and delivered a standout performance in the 2009–10 Riksserien season, tallying a career best 39 points in 28 games. During the 2011–12, she scored 29 points in 28 games contributing to Brynäs first ever regular season championship. She became club captain in 2013.

In March 2018, at the age of 26, she announced her retirement from ice hockey. She later joined a Brynäs task force to try and solve the issues with the club's women's side. Two months later, she signed a three-year contract with bandy club Skutskärs IF. In 2019, she helped lead Skutskärs to the Swedish championship finals.

=== International ===
Östlund represented Sweden at the IIHF World Women's U18 Championships in 2008 and 2009, winning a bronze medal at the 2009 tournament. She would go on to make multiple appearances with the senior national team throughout her career, but was never able to secure a spot on a senior World Championship or Olympic roster.
