= Catherine White (ice hockey) =

Canadian ice hockey player

- Born: February 5, 1990 (age 35) Brampton, Ontario, Canada
- Height: 5 ft 10 in (178 cm)
- Weight: 159 lb (72 kg; 11 st 5 lb)
- Position: Forward
- Shoots: Left
- ECAC team: Cornell
- National team: Canada
- Playing career: 2010–present

Catherine White
Medal record

Women's ice hockey

Representing Canada

IIHF U18 Women's World
Silver medal – second place	2008 Canada	2008 Tournament
Silver medal – second place	2009 United States	2009 Tournament

MLP Cup
Gold medal – first place	2011 Switzerland	Tournament

Catherine White (born February 5, 1990) is a Canadian ice hockey player. White has competed for Hockey Canada in numerous international tournaments. Currently, she is a member of the Cornell Big Red. Of note, she scored the first goal in the history of the Canadian National Women's Under 18 program (on August 23, 2007, in Ottawa, Ontario).

== Playing career ==
White captained the Brampton Canadettes to a bronze medal at OWHA provincials in 2004. She was a member of Ontario Blue at the November 2005 National Women's Under-18 Championship, finishing sixth.

White won a gold medal with Team Ontario Red at the 2007 National Women's Under-18 Championship. At the 2007 OWHA provincials, she skated with Mississauga and won a bronze medal. In the same year, she skated at the 2007 Canada Winter Games with Team Ontario and won the gold medal. One of her teammates on Team Ontario (and with Mississauga) was Laura McIntosh.

In 2008, she won a bronze medal with the Mississauga Chiefs at OWHA provincials. In the same year, she won a bronze medal with Mississauga at the PWHL championship in 2008. From 2005 to 2008, she was in the top five in scoring for Mississauga

=== NCAA ===
In 2008, White joined the Cornell Big Red women's ice hockey program. She recorded the most points by a Cornell freshman since 1979-80 while finishing second in Cornell scoring. White led ECAC freshman in scoring and finished fourth among NCAA freshmen in points per game.

The following season, White was recognized as Cornell's co-Most Valuable Player. She led Cornell in scoring in 2009–10, while finishing sixth in the NCAA in assists per game in 2009–10. She was integral in helping Cornell reach the NCAA championship game at the Frozen Four in 2010

=== Hockey Canada ===
White was a member of Canada's first ever National Women's Under-18 Team. The team competed in a three-game series vs. the United States in Ottawa, Ontario in August 2007. On August 23, 2007, scoring the first goal in national team history. It was assisted by future Cornell teammate Lauriane Rougeau.

She went on to win a silver medal with Canada's National Women's Under-18 Team at the 2008 IIHF World Women's Under-18 Championships. In a January 9, 2008 contest versus Germany (contested at the inaugural World Women's Under-18 hockey championship), Catherine White had a short-handed goal in a 10–1 win. In August 2009, White was a member of Canada's National Women's Under-22 Team. She participated in a three-game series vs. the US in Calgary, Alberta. The following year, she competed for the Under-22 team once more. The team played a three-game series vs. the US in Toronto.

Internationally, White won a gold medal with Canada's National Women's Under-22 Team at the 2010 MLP Cup in Ravensburg, Germany. In January 2011, she would win a second gold medal as part of the Canadian team that won at the 2011 MLP Cup. She scored one of the six goals in the gold medal game of the 2011 MLP Cup.

== Awards and honours ==
- Cornell Rookie of the Year in 2008–09
- ECAC Rookie of the Year in 2008–09
- Ivy League Rookie of the Year in 2008–09
- ECAC Second All-Star Team in 2008–09
- Ivy League Second All-Star Team in 2008–09
- ECAC All-Rookie Team in 2008–09
- Cornell's co-Most Valuable Player, 2009–10
- RBK Hockey/AHCA Women's Division I 2009-10 Second Team All-American
- 2010-11 Second Team All-Ivy
- Co-recipient, 2012 TGHA Cub Club Mentor Award
