= Valentina Lizana Wallner =

Swedish ice hockey goaltender

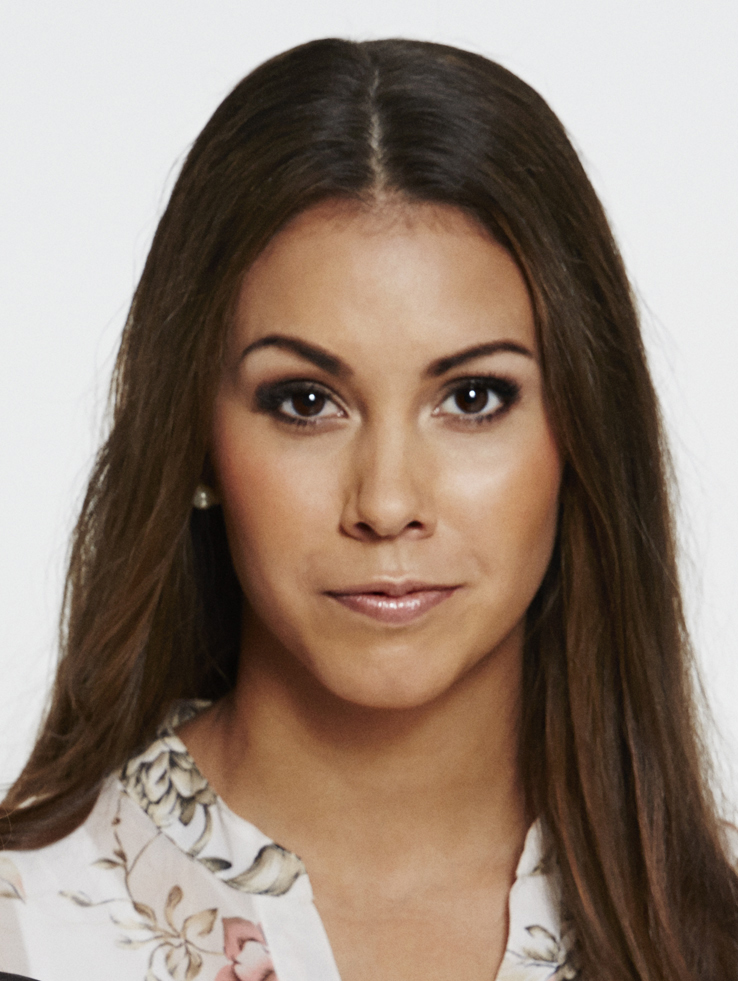
- Born: 30 March 1990 (age 36) Stockholm, Sweden
- Height: 170 cm (5 ft 7 in)
- Weight: 65 kg (143 lb; 10 st 3 lb)
- Position: Goaltender
- Caught: Left
- Played for: Haninge Anchors HC; Djurgårdens IF; Modo Hockey; AIK IF
- National team: Sweden
- Playing career: 2005–2017

Valentina Olivia Violeta Lizana Wallner (born 30 March 1990) is a Swedish retired ice hockey goaltender and coach.

== International career ==
Lizana Wallner was selected for the Sweden women's national ice hockey team in the 2010 Winter Olympics, but did not play during the tournament.

Lizana Wallner also appeared for Sweden at the 2009 IIHF Women's World Championship, playing in four games, winning three and finishing with a goals against average of 1.25. She also played twice at the 2013 IIHF Women's World Championship, losing both games, and allowing 6 goals on 49 shots.

She also represented her country at junior level, playing for the Sweden women's national under-18 ice hockey team. In 2008, she played in four games, winning two, with a goals against average of 2.66.

Lizana Wallner played also for Sweden the 2014 Olympics in Sochi. She wanted to have the face of Stefan Liv on her Helmet, but was refused by the International Olympic Committee.

== Personal life ==
Lizana Wallner's father is from Chile, and her mother is Finnish.

== Career statistics ==
=== International career ===
Year	Team	Event	Result	GP	W	L	T/OT	MIN	GA	SO	GAA	SV%
2008	Sweden	U18	4th	4	2	2	0	180:15	8	1	2.66	0.900
2009	Sweden	WC	4th	4	3	0	2	240:00	5	2	1.25	0.933
2013	Sweden	WC	7th	2	0	0	0	89:53	6	0	4.01	0.878
2014	Sweden	OG	4th	5	2	2	0	269:16	13	1	2.90	0.915
