= Mallory Deluce =

Canadian ice hockey player

- Born: 13 April 1989 (age 37) Toronto, Ontario, Canada
- Height: 5 ft 6.5 in (169 cm)
- Weight: 138 lb (63 kg; 9 st 12 lb)
- Position: Forward
- Shoots: Left
- CWHL team: Toronto Furies
- National team: Canada
- Playing career: 2006–present

Mallory Deluce
Medal record

Women's ice hockey

Representing Canada

MLP Nations Cup
Gold medal – first place	2008 Germany	2008 Tournament
Gold medal – first place	2009 Germany	2009 Tournament
Gold medal – first place	2010 Germany	2011 Tournament
Gold medal – first place	2011 Switzerland	2011 Tournament

Mallory Deluce (born 13 April 1989) is a former Canadian ice hockey forward who played for the Wisconsin Badgers, Toronto Furies, and the Canadian Women's Hockey Team.

== Playing career ==
In 2000, Deluce won a gold medal with the London Jr. Devilettes at Ottawa Women's Hockey Association provincials (Atom AA).

She was a member of the Bluewater Hawks Intermediate AA team for three seasons and was a two time recipient of the team's MVP award. With Bluewater, she won the Provincial Women's Hockey League (now known as the Ontario Women's Hockey League) championship in 2003. In the same year, she won a gold medal with Bluewater at the OWHA provincials.

Deluce captained Ontario Red to a gold medal at the November 2005 National Women's Under-18 championships. In 2005–06 she led the Provincial Women's Hockey League in points with 135 (49 goals, 86 assists) in 67 games played. Deluce competed for Ontario at the Canadian Under-18 National Championships in 2005 and 2006 and won the gold medal twice. In addition, she served as the team captain of the 2006 squad. Deluce also played for the Mississauga Jr. Aeros of the National Women's Hockey League.

=== Canada Winter Games ===
At the 2007 Canada Winter Games, she captained Team Ontario to a gold medal. Against Newfoundland, Deluce was on a line with Rebecca Johnston and Jenn Wakefield. The three combined for 12 points in a 19–0 victory.

=== NCAA ===
Her freshman year with the Wisconsin Badgers was in 2007–08. Her 31 points ranked her ninth in the NCAA in points by a rookie. Her 12 goals ranked fifth on the Badgers. Deluce played in 39 of 41 games. On 20 October, she scored a hat trick versus WCHA rival St. Cloud State Huskies. As a rookie, Deluce played in the NCAA championship game. The following season, Deluce accumulated 32 points, 12 goals and 20 assists. For the season, she had 11 multiple-point games and won the NCAA Frozen Four.

In the 2009–10 season — her junior year — she played in 32 games, compiling 32 points (13 goals and 19 assists). She had a multi-goal game against the Providence Friars on 28 November 2009. From 11 October to 7 November, she had a career-high seven-game point streak. In addition, she ranked second on the team in scoring.

In 2010–11, Deluce was named an assistant captain. On 1 October, she earned two points against RPI Engineers. In a two-game series on 4 and 5 December versus WCHA rival North Dakota Fighting Hawks, Deluce had three points.

=== CWHL ===
Deluce was drafted 11th overall by Toronto Furies in the 2011 CWHL Draft. She was the Furies' leading scorer in her rookie season.

In 2015, she was named the recipient of the Isobel Gathorne-Hardy Award.

== Hockey Canada ==
Deluce was Invited to participate in the 2007 Canadian National Women's Team Fall Festival from 1–8 September in Prince George, British Columbia. She was also selected to participate in Hockey Canada's 2010 Summer Strength and Conditioning Camp (from 25–30 May). Deluce won gold at the 2010 MLP Nations Cup in Ravensburg, Germany. She repeated the feat at the 2011 MLP Nations Cup in Kreuzlingen, Switzerland. Deluce assisted Canada to four shutout wins with five points.

In March 2011, she was invited to the Canadian national women's ice hockey team selection camp to determine the final roster for the 2011 IIHF Women's World Championship. She was a member of the team that competed in the 2011 IIHF Eight Nations Tournament.On 31 August 2011, Deluce scored a goal as Canada lost for just the second time in 66 all-time international meetings against Sweden by a 6–4 mark.

== Personal ==
In high school, Deluce also competed in cross country and soccer

== Awards and honours ==
- WCHA All-Rookie Team (2007–08)
- WCHA Rookie of the Week (Week of 15 October 2007)
- WCHA Rookie of the Week (Week of 22 October 2007)
- WCHA Rookie of the Week (Week of 18 February 2008)
- WCHA All-Star Team (2009–10)
- Isobel Gathorne-Hardy Award (2015)
