= Cassandra Poudrier =

Canadian ice hockey player

- Born: December 5, 1992 (age 33) Terrebonne, Quebec, Canada
- Height: 5 ft 5 in (165 cm)
- Weight: 161 lb (73 kg; 11 st 7 lb)
- Position: Defence
- Shoots: Left
- CWHL team Former teams: Les Canadiennes de Montreal: Cornell University (NCAA); Dawson College (RESQ); Lanaudière Pionnieres (Midget AA)
- National team: Canada
- Playing career: 2016–present
Medal record
Women's ice hockey
Representing Canada
IIHF U18 World Championships
Gold medal – first place	2010 United States	Tournament
Nations Cup
Gold medal – first place	2015 Germany	Tournament

Cassandra Poudrier (born December 5, 1992) is an ice hockey player who currently plays in the CWHL for Les Canadiennes de Montreal. On October 3, 2011, she was named to the Team Canada roster that will participate in the 2011 4 Nations Cup.

== Playing career ==
=== Hockey Canada ===
In April 2010, Poudrier competed for Canada at the Under-18 World Championship, as the Canadian team won the Gold Medal. As a member of the gold medal winning squad, a hockey card of her was featured in the Upper Deck 2010 World of Sports card series.

She was a member of Canada's National Women's Development Team that won a gold medal at the 2015 Nations Cup (formerly known as the Meco Cup). In the gold medal game of the 2015 Nations Cup, she would log an assist in a 4-0 win against Sweden.

=== NCAA ===
In January 2012, it was announced that Poudrier committed to joining the Cornell Big Red in autumn 2012. She was the top-scoring freshman defenseman in her first season and was named to the ECAC Hockey All Rookie Team. She earned Ivy League Honorable Mention and Third Team All-ECAC Hockey honors as a sophomore and was named to the ECAC Hockey All-Tournament Team as a junior. During her senior season, while serving as team captain, she was named a Second Team All-Ivy Selection. She was selected for membership in the Quill and Dagger society.

=== Professional ===
Poudrier was drafted by the Connecticut Whale of the Premier Hockey Federation 18th overall in the 5th round of the 2015 draft. In the 2016 Canadian Women's Hockey League draft she was taken 10th overall by the Montreal Les Canadiennes. Poudrier has since started her professional career with Les Canadiennes, choosing to play in the CWHL.

== Career stats ==
=== Hockey Canada ===
Year	Event	Games Played	Goals	Assists	Points	+/-	PIM
2007	National Under 18	5	0	2	2	0	2
2008	National Under 18	5	0	0	0	0	6
2009	National Under 18	5	0	4	4	0	8
