= Tara Watchorn =

Canadian ice hockey player (born 1990)

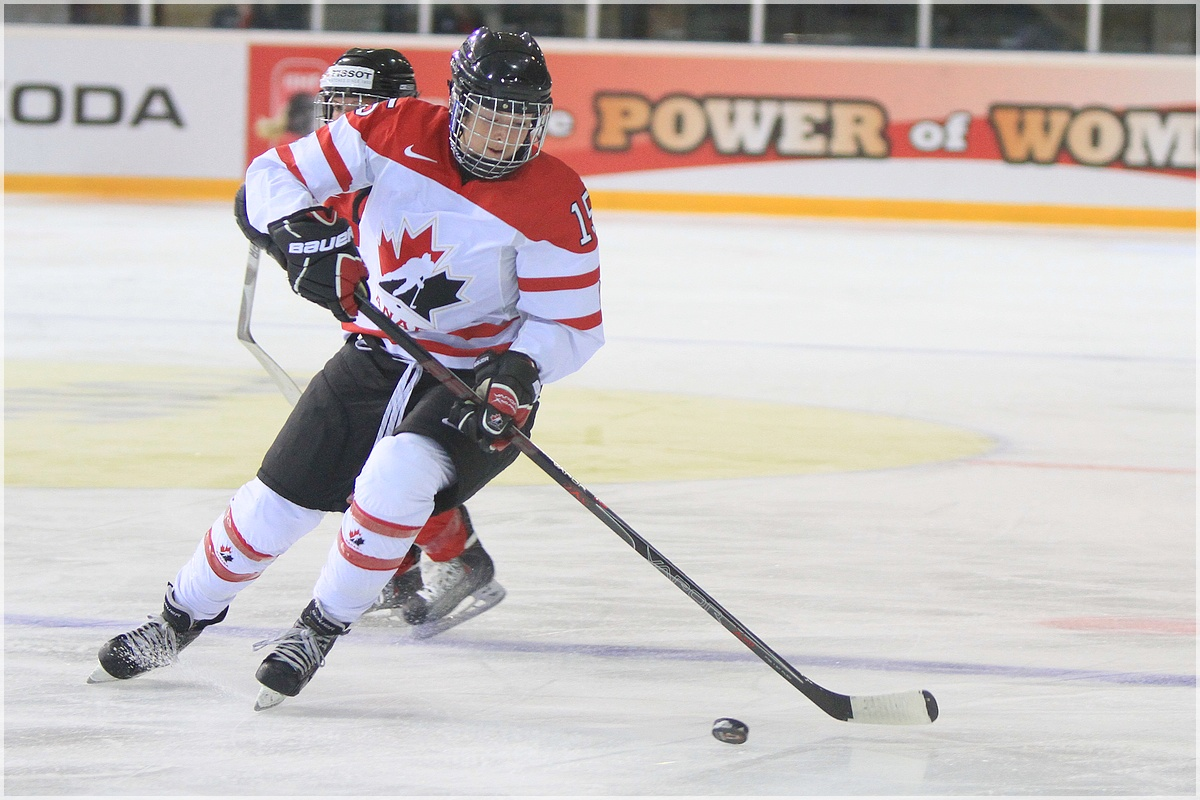
- IIHF World Women Championship 2011. Preliminary Round Game Group B. Canada - Switzerland 12-0.
- Born: May 30, 1990 (age 36) Ajax, Ontario, Canada
- Height: 5 ft 10 in (178 cm)
- Weight: 176 lb (80 kg; 12 st 8 lb)
- Position: Defence
- Shot: Left
- Played for: Boston Blades
- National team: Canada
- Playing career: 2008–2017
Medal record
Olympic Games
Gold medal – first place	2014 Sochi	Team
World Championships
Silver medal – second place	2011 Switzerland
Silver medal – second place	2015 Sweden
Silver medal – second place	2016 Canada
World U18 Championships
Silver medal – second place	2008 Canada

Tara Leigh-Anne Watchorn (born May 30, 1990) is a Canadian women's ice hockey coach and former player who is currently the head coach of the Boston University women's ice hockey team. She made her debut for Team Canada in the 2010 Four Nations Cup and played for Canada most recently at the 2014 Winter Olympics. Watchorn was born in Ajax, Ontario, but grew up in Newcastle, Ontario.

== Playing career ==
Watchorn competed for the Durham West Jr. Lightning in Ontario. She won silver in the PWHL tournament in her junior year and bronze as a sophomore. She represented Team Ontario in the National Under 18 tournament and won a championship. She was picked as the High School Athlete of the Year as a freshman at St. Stephens secondary school in Bowmanville. Watchorn earned MVP honors for basketball, volleyball, soccer and hockey.

=== NCAA ===
In her freshman season (2008–09) with Boston University, Watchorn played in every game. Her six goals led all defenders on the Terriers roster. On October 23, she earned her first career goal in a 3–2 win against New Hampshire. Two days later, she registered three assists in an 8–1 win against Maine. She was twice Named Hockey East Rookie of the Week.

During the 2009–10 season, Watchorn competed in 31 contests. Her fourteen assists were good enough for third overall among defenders in Hockey East. She was a member of the Hockey East All-Star Team that played the U.S. Women's National Team on Nov. 22. On November 14, she accumulated three assists in 5–3 win over Providence. An injury prevented her participation in the MLP Cup. The highlight of the season was getting the championship-winning goal against Connecticut in the Hockey East title game

Watchorn participated in the NCAA tournament for the first time. Against Mercyhurst in the NCAA quarterfinals (on March 13, 2010), she scored the Terriers lone goal.

In her junior season (2010–11), she registered a shorthanded goal and an assist against Union on Oct. 9. Six days later, she had a goal and an assist against Wayne State.

=== Hockey Canada ===
In a January 9, 2008 contest versus Germany (contested at the inaugural World Women's Under-18 hockey championship), Watchorn logged two goals (plus one assist) in a 10–1 win. Watchorn competed with the Canadian Under 22 team in the January 2010 MLP Cup. She won gold and tallied an assist in the tournament. She was part of the Canadian National Under 22 team that competed in the 2011 MLP Cup. She played for Canada at the 2014 Winter Olympics, scoring one goal in five games.

=== CWHL ===
Originally drafted by Team Alberta, she signed with the Boston Blades as a free agent in autumn 2014. She would contribute to the Blades winning the 2015 Clarkson Cup. During the 2014–15 CWHL season, Watchorn led all blueliners in scoring, and was named the recipient of the CWHL Defenseman of the Year Award in 2015. In the autumn of 2015, she was named team captain of the Blades.

== Career stats ==
=== NCAA ===
Season	GP	G	A	Pts	PPG	SHG	GWG	PIM
2008–09	36	6	10	16	2	0	0	36
2009–10	31	3	14	17	1	0	1	39
2010–11	5	2	4	6	0	1	0	6

==== Hockey East play ====
Season	GP	G	A	Pts	PPG	SHG	GWG	PIM
2008–09	21	5	9	14	2	0	0	16
2009–10	18	0	11	11	0	0	0	20
2010–11								

=== Hockey Canada ===
Event	GP	G	A	Pts	PPG	GWG	PIM
2007 Under 18 Exhibition	3	0	0	0	0	0	2
2007 National Under 18	5	0	1	1	0	0	6
2008 Women’s Under 18	5	4	7	11	1	0	0
2010 Four Nations Cup							
2014 Olympics	5	1	0	1	0	0	10

=== CWHL ===
Year	Team	Games Played	Goals	Assists	Points	+/-	PIM	PPG	SHG	GWG
2012–13	Team Alberta									
2014–15	Boston Blades	21	6	14	20	+25	26	2	0	2

== Awards and honours ==
=== NCAA ===
- 2009 Women's Division I New England Hockey Writers All-Star team
- 2009 Women's Division I New England Hockey Writers All-Rookie team
- 2010 Hockey East All-Tournament Team honors
- 2010 All-Hockey East Second Team
- 2010 Women's Division I New England All-Star
- Hockey East Co-Player of the Week (Week of March 15, 2010)
- Hockey East Defensive Player of the Week honors on March 8, 2010
- Hockey East Honor Roll (October 19, 2009)
- Hockey East Honor Roll (November 16, 2009)
- Hockey East Honor Roll (February 1, 2010)
- Hockey East Honor Roll (October 11, 2010)
- Hockey East 10th Anniversary Team selection, Honorable Mention

=== CWHL ===
- CWHL co-leader, Plus-Minus rating +25 (2014–15)
- 2015 CWHL Defenceman of the Year Award

Preceded by Cathy Chartrand (2014)	2015 CWHL Defenceman of the Year Award winner (2015)	Succeeded by Laura Fortino (2016)
