= Courtney Birchard-Kessel =

Canadian ice hockey player and coach

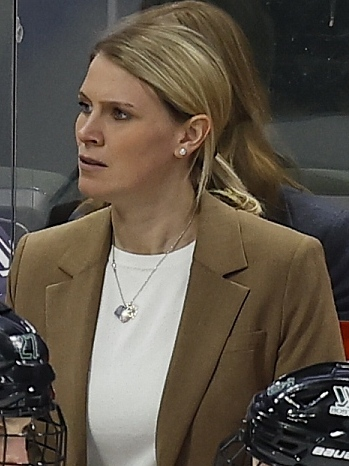
- Birchard-Kessel in 2024

Current position
- Title: Head coach
- Team: Princeton
- Conference: ECAC

Biographical details
- Born: July 14, 1989 (age 37); Etobicoke, Ontario, Canada
- Education: University of New Hampshire

Playing career
- 2007–2011: New Hampshire Wildcats
- 2011–2017: Brampton CWHL
- 2017–2018: ICE Dream Košice
- 2018: Linköping HC
- Positions: Defense, forward

Coaching career (HC unless noted)
- 2018–2019: Toronto Furies
- 2018–2019: Canada U18 (Assistant coach)
- 2019–2022: Princeton Tigers (Assistant coach)
- 2022–2023: Canada U18
- 2023: Boston University Terriers (Associate HC)
- 2023–2025: Boston Fleet
- 2025–present: Princeton Tigers
Medal record
Women's ice hockey
Representing Canada
World Championship
Gold medal – first place	2012 United States
Silver medal – second place	2013 Canada
Silver medal – second place	2015 Sweden

Courtney Birchard-Kessel (née Birchard; born July 14, 1989) is a Canadian ice hockey coach and former player, currently serving as the head coach of the Princeton Tigers women's ice hockey team.

During her playing career, she was a member of the Canadian national ice hockey team and was a three-time IIHF Women's World Championship medallist. Her debut with Team Canada was made at the 2010 Four Nations Cup.

Birchard-Kessel was drafted 6th overall by the Brampton Thunder in the 2011 CWHL Draft.

== Playing career ==
Birchard-Kessel is a 2007 graduate of Lincoln M. Alexander Secondary School in Malton, Ontario. While at the school, Birchard-Kessel lettered in ice hockey, soccer, basketball, and badminton.

In addition, she competed with the Toronto Jr. Aeros. While with the club, she won provincial titles in 2005 and 2006. The club was also playoff champions in 2004, 2006, and 2007. She served as the Jr. Aeros' captain during the 2006–07 season.

=== NCAA ===
Birchard-Kessel attended the University of New Hampshire and played with the New Hampshire Wildcats women's ice hockey program in the Hockey East conference of the NCAA Division I. She tallied her first career point on an assist in her college ice hockey debut on October 5, 2007, against the St. Lawrence Saints. Her first collegiate goal was scored on October 28, 2007, against the Maine Black Bears. On October 17, 2009, she reached her fiftieth career point in a game against the Niagara Purple Eagles.

During her freshman year of 2007–08 with the New Hampshire Wildcats, she accumulated 28 points (13 in Hockey East play). Birchard-Kessel ranked second in Hockey East rookie scoring at 0.85 points per game (ppg). The Wildcats qualified for the NCAA tournament and Birchard-Kessel scored a goal in the NCAA quarterfinal win versus St. Lawrence. On February 16, she established career highs in goals (two) and points (four) versus the Vermont Catamounts.

The 2008–09 season was her sophomore season and Birchard-Kessel skated in all 32 regular-season games, while participating in three postseason games. For the season, she had accumulated 23 points (10 in conference play). She notched a goal in the NCAA quarterfinal game against the Minnesota Duluth Bulldogs. Against Niagara (October 12), she matched her personal best of two goals scored in one game. In nineteen games, she registered at least one point.

In her junior season (2009–10), Birchard-Kessel missed the last six games of the season due to injury. Statistically, Birchard-Kessel ranked fifth in the NCAA in defensemen scoring (0.81 ppg). Birchard-Kessel led the Wildcats in shots (136) and tied for the lead in game-winning goals. She accumulated 13 points in conference play. One of the highlights of the season was notching a career-high three assists in the Sun Life Frozen Fenway game on January 8 vs. the Northeastern Huskies. Game winning goals were scored against Colgate (October 9), Connecticut (October 31 and February 7), and Northeastern (November 29).

=== Hockey Canada ===
Birchard-Kessel was part of the 2007–08 Hockey Canada women's national under-22 team that competed in the MLP Cup. She attended the Canadian Development Camps in numerous years. In 2007, she participated in the U-19 National Development Camp. The following year, she was invited to the U-22 National Development Camp. She was part of the Canadian national under-22 team that competed in the 2011 MLP Cup. She travelled to Bratislava, Slovakia to participate in the 2011 IIHF High Performance Women's Camp from July 4–12. On April 17, 2012, Birchard-Kessel along with Meghan Agosta, Gillian Apps, Caroline Ouellette, and head coach Dan Church took part in the opening face off of the playoff game between the Ottawa Senators and the New York Rangers at ScotiaBank Place.

=== CWHL ===
Birchard-Kessel scored a goal for the Brampton Thunder in the championship game of the 2012 Clarkson Cup.

== Coaching career ==
Birchard-Kessel served as the head coach at Havergal College in Toronto and also as an assistant in the Oakville Hornets organization.

On July 31, 2018, the Toronto Furies signed Birchard-Kessel as their new head coach for the 2018–19 CWHL season. During the same season, she made her coaching debut with Hockey Canada as an assistant coach to the Canadian women's national under-18 ice hockey team, which won gold at the 2019 IIHF U18 Women's World Championship.

Following the dissolution of the Toronto Furies as part of the collapse of the Canadian Women's Hockey League in the spring of 2019, Birchard-Kessel joined the Princeton Tigers women's ice hockey program in the ECAC Hockey conference as an assistant coach. She held the role for four seasons, through the 2022–23 season.

She was head coach of the Canadian women's national U18 team for the 2022–23 and, with Birchard-Kessel at the helm, Canada claimed gold at the 2023 IIHF U18 Women's World Championship.

In May 2023, she assumed the associate head coach position with the Boston University Terriers women's ice hockey program of Boston University in the Hockey East conference.

In September 2023, she was named the inaugural head coach of PWHL Boston of the PWHL. Kessel led the team to a 17-10-8-19 record across two seasons, including the Walter Cup Finals in the inaugural season.

On June 23, 2025, Princeton University Athletics announced Kessel as the women's ice hockey head coach. She previously served as an assistant coach for the Tigers for four seasons under Cara Morey, who relinquished her role to become the inaugural general manager of the Vancouver Goldeneyes.

== Personal life ==
Birchard-Kessel was born in Etobicoke, Ontario, Canada on July 14, 1989.

Birchard-Kessel is married to American former professional ice hockey player Blake Kessel, whose siblings include hockey players Phil Kessel and Amanda Kessel.

== Awards and honours ==
- AWCHA All-America Second Team (2010)
- Patty Kazmaier Memorial Award candidate (2010)
- Hockey East First Team All-Star (2010)
- Hockey East All-Academic Team (2009)
- Hockey East All-Tournament Team (2009)
- Hockey East Player of the Week (Week of November 9, 2009)
- Hockey East Mission Rookie of the Week (Week of March 17, 2008)
- 2010–11 New England Women's Division I All-Stars
- 2011 Karyn Bye Award (New Hampshire MVP)

== Career stats ==
=== NCAA ===
Season	GP	G	A	Pts	PPG	GWG	PIM
2007–08	28	8	13	21	2	0	14
2008–09	35	9	14	23	2	4	32
2009–10	27	9	13	22	6	4	32
