= Jenn Wakefield =

Canadian ice hockey player and coach

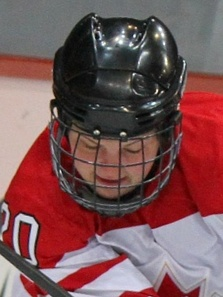
- Wakefield in 2011
- Born: June 15, 1989 (age 37) Scarborough, Ontario, Canada
- Height: 6 ft 0 in (183 cm)
- Weight: 172 lb (78 kg; 12 st 4 lb)
- Position: Centre
- Shoots: Right
- SDHL team Former teams: MoDo Hockey: New Hampshire Wildcats; Boston University Terriers; Toronto Furies; Munksund Skuthamn SK; IK Guts; Borås HC; Nybro Flames; Luleå HF/MSSK; Brynäs IF; Djurgårdens IF; Linköping HC; Skärblacka IF
- Coached for: Netherlands; Almtuna IS (Damettan)
- National team: Canada
- Playing career: 2007–present
- Coaching career: 2021–present
- Website: Official website
Medal record
Olympic Games
Gold medal – first place	2014 Sochi	Ice hockey
Silver medal – second place	2018 Pyeongchang	Ice hockey
World Championships
Gold medal – first place	2012 United States
Silver medal – second place	2011 Switzerland
Silver medal – second place	2013 Canada
Silver medal – second place	2015 Sweden
Silver medal – second place	2016 Canada
Silver medal – second place	2017 United States

Jennifer Dorothy June Wakefield (born June 15, 1989) is a Canadian ice hockey player and coach, currently playing in the Swedish Women's Hockey League (SDHL) with MoDo Hockey Dam. She has served as an assistant coach to the Netherlands' women's national ice hockey team and the women's representative team of Almtuna IS in the Damettan. As a member of the Canadian national ice hockey team, she was a substitute for the roster that participated in 2010 Winter Olympics and played on the gold-medal winning team at the 2014 Winter Olympics, and the silver-medal winning team at the 2018 Winter Olympics.

== Playing career ==
=== Junior years ===
Wakefield won a gold medal with Team Ontario at the 2007 Canada Winter Games. She led the tournament in scoring with twenty points (twelve goals and eight assists). In a game versus Newfoundland at the Canada Winter Games (March 5, 2007), Wakefield was on a line with Mallory Deluce and Rebecca Johnston. The three combined for 12 points in a 19–0 victory. She won a silver medal at the Ontario Women's Hockey Association provincial championships in 2006 with the Durham West Jr. Lightning of the PWHL. Wakefield played for Team Ontario Red at the 2005 National Women's Under-18 Championship and was part of the gold medal winning team.

=== CWHL ===
Wakefield played one season (2009–10) for the Vaughan Flames in the Canadian Women's Hockey League. Returning to the CWHL after graduating from Boston University, she would be the 12th overall selection by the Toronto Furies in the 2012 CWHL Draft. Wakefield made her CWHL debut on October 20, 2012, a 4–3 win at Brampton. The following day, she scored the first two goals of her CWHL career. Assisted by Chaterine White, said goal was scored against Florence Schelling, who was in her CWHL debut. In the third period, she would score her second goal of the game, assisted by Jenny Brine and Shannon Moulson. In addition, Wakefield was recognized as the Second Star of the Game. Her performance against Brampton marked the start of a five-game scoring streak, which culminated on November 18, 2012, versus Team Alberta.

In the aftermath of a 4–3 home loss against the Boston Blades on October 27, 2012, Wakefield was named Third Star of the Game, having scored a pair of goals in the third period.

The first game-winning goal of her CWHL career was scored on November 24, 2012, a road contest against the Montreal Stars. Said goal was scored against Charline Labonté. On January 12, 2013, Wakefield recorded her first career hat trick in CWHL play, including the game-winning goal, recording the feat against Brampton Thunder goaltender Liz Knox.

=== Hockey Canada ===
After being cut from the Olympic team in December 2009 due to a broken hand, Wakefield played for the Canadian Under 22 team that participated in the MLP Cup in 2010. She scored a goal in the Gold Medal win over Switzerland that was played on January 9, 2010. She played in the 2014 Winter Olympics for Canada.

=== NCAA ===
==== University of New Hampshire ====
Her freshman year was in 2007–08. Wakefield finished second in New Hampshire scoring, but led all New Hampshire freshmen in scoring. She helped New Hampshire reach the NCAA Frozen Four. As a sophomore, Wakefield led New Hampshire in scoring. In addition, Wakefield led the Wildcats with 13 power play goals, four shorthanded goals and nine game-winning goals.

==== Boston University ====
- In January 2010, it was announced that Wakefield will play for the Boston University Terriers women's ice hockey program.
- December 7 and 10: In wins over Northeastern and Harvard, Wakefield recorded four points (2g, 2a) in wins over Northeastern and Harvard. On December 7, Wakefield had one goal and two assists as the Terriers defeated the Huskies by a 3–0 mark. She recorded 13 shots on goal in the two games.
- In December 2010, Wakefield recorded seven points in just three games. She was part of the Terriers earning back-to-back Hockey East shutouts with three points, including a power-play and game-winning goal, in a 4–0 win against the Connecticut Huskies. In a 3–0 triumph over Northeastern, Wakefield scored a goal (in which she launched a game-high 11 shots). In the month's final game, Wakefield netted a goal and two assists as the Terriers defeated the Harvard Crimson for the first time in program history.
- On January 15 and 16, 2011, Wakefield recorded three goals and three assists in games against Boston College and Maine. In the win against Boston College, she had a four-point effort (2 goals, 2 assists) as she was part of all four points in a 4–0 win over the Eagles
- March 12, 2011: Wakefield scored two goals, including an empty net goal with twelve seconds left, as BU defeated Mercyhurst in the NCAA regional playoff.
- May 7, 2011: Wakefield was named captain of the Terriers for the 2011–12 season.
- November 2, 2011: In a 4–1 defeat of rival Boston College, Wakefield scored her 100th career goal. With the accomplishment, she became the first Hockey East women's player to reach the 100 goal mark. Wakefield scored 59 goals in two seasons at New Hampshire (59 goals) before transferring to Boston University, where she netted 41 goals to reach the milestone.

=== Sweden ===
- In the 2013–14 season, she played with Munksund-Skuthamn SK in the Swedish Women's Hockey League (SDHL).
- In 2014–15, she played with Linköping HC Dam in the SDHL and IK Guts in the men's Hockeytvåan.
- In 2015–16, she continued with Linköping HC of the SDHL and played with Borås HC in the men's Hockeyettan.
- In the 2016–17 season, Wakefield played 30 regular season and five playoff games with Linköping HC in the SDHL and one game with the Nybro Flames of the Hockeytvåan.
- In the 2017–18 season, she played six regular season and seven playoff games in the SDHL with Luleå HF/MSSK .
- In the 2018–19 season, she played nine SDHL regular season games with Brynäs IF.
- In the 2019–20 season, she played thirty regular season and four playoff games in the SDHL with Djurgårdens IF.
- She is signed with Linköping HC for the 2020–21 SDHL season.
- In the 2022-23 season, she played with Modo in the SDHL

== Career statistics ==
Season	Team	League	GP	G	A	Pts	+/-	PIM
2007–08	New Hampshire Wildcats	NCAA	33	27	19	46		57
2008–09	New Hampshire Wildcats	NCAA	31	32	17	49		44
2009–10	Vaughan Flames	CWHL
2010–11	Boston University Terriers	NCAA	34	32	22	54		30
2011–12	Boston University Terriers	NCAA	36	29	28	57		54
2012–13	Toronto Furies	CWHL	24	13	5	18	+5	34
2013–14	Canada	Centralization	32	10	8	18	N/A	34
2013–14	Canada	OG	5	0	1	1		0
2014–15	Linkoping	SDHL	15	18	4	22	+14	38
2015–16	Linkoping	SDHL	18	38	17	55	+41	24
2016–17	Linkoping	SDHL

== Awards and honours ==
- 2008 Hockey East Rookie of the Year
- 2008 Hockey East First All-Star Team
- 2008 Hockey East All-Tournament Team
- 2008 Hockey East All-Academic Team
- Top-10 finalist for the 2009 Patty Kazmaier Memorial Award
- Hockey East Player of the Month in December 2008
- Hockey East Player of the Month in April 2009
- Hockey East Pure Hockey Player of the Week (Week of October 4, 2010)
- Hockey East Pure Hockey Player of the Week (Week of December 13, 2010)
- Hockey East Pure Hockey Player of the Month (December 2010)
- Hockey East Pure Hockey Player of the Week (Week of January 17, 2011)
- Hockey East Player of the Week (Week of October 3, 2011)
- 2011 Patty Kazmaier Award Nominee
- 2011 Hockey East All-Tournament team
- 2011 New England Women's Division I All-Star selection
- Hockey East Player of the Month (Month of October 2011)
- Hockey East Player of the Week (Week of January 23, 2012)
- Hockey East Player of the Month (Month of January 2012)
- Hockey East Player of the Week (Week of February 27, 2012)
- Hockey East Scoring Champion (2011–12)
- Hockey East 10th Anniversary Team selection
