= 2011–12 ECAC Hockey women's season =

The 2011–12 ECAC women's ice hockey season marked the continuation of the annual tradition of competitive ice hockey among ECAC members.

== Regular season ==
=== News and notes ===
==== October ====
- October 1: In a match versus No. 8 nationally ranked Mercyhurst, Quinnipiac goaltender Victoria Vigilanti made 24 saves in a 1-0 shutout victory. It was the Bobcats first victory over Mercyhurst in twelve matches.
- October 7–8: In a pair of victories over the Lindenwood Lions, Colgate skater Brittany Phillips accumulated a total of 10 points. In the 7-2 victory on October 7, she notched two goals, while logging an assist. One of the goals was the game-winning goal. The following day, she had seven points (two goals, five assists) in an 8-2 win. Of the four goals she scored, two were power play goals. Her seven points ranked second in program history for most points in one game. In addition, the five assists ranked second for most assists in one game. In addition, Melissa Kueber registered six points in the sweep. On October 8, she led the team with four goals scored in an 8-2 triumph over the Lions. She also notched an assist. The four tallies tied for first in program history for most scores in one game.
- October 22: Clarkson sophomore forward Jamie Lee Rattray notched two goals for the Golden Knights in a 2-1 decision over the visiting New Hampshire Wildcats women's ice hockey program. The win helped the Golden Knights extend their unbeaten streak to six games. In addition, it was the 150th victory in the history of the program, dating back to the 2003-04 season. With the victory, the Golden Knights all-time mark is 150-111-38.

==== November ====
- November 1: For the third consecutive contest, the Cornell Big Red scored at least nine goals in one game. Senior captain Chelsea Karpenko appeared in her 100th career game, as Jillian Saulnier led all Big Red players with two goals and three assists in a 9-2 triumph over the Syracuse Orange women's ice hockey program.
- November 4: Emilie Arseneault scored a short handed goal late into the second period to give the Union Dutchwomen a 2-1 conference victory over the Clarkson Golden Knights women's ice hockey program. It was the Dutchwomen's first ECAC win since the 2009-2010 season, and only their second ECAC win since 2004.
- November 19: With a second period goal versus the Colgate Raiders, Kelly Babstock of the Quinnipiac Bobcats became the program's all-time leading scorer. In just her second season, Babstock surpassed Vicki Graham, who finished with 73 career points, after the 2006-07 season. Babstock reached the milestone in her 50th career game.

=== Standings ===
2011–12 Eastern College Athletic Conference standings
	Conference							Overall					
	GP	W	L	T	PTS	GF	GA	GP	W	L	T	GF	GA
#3Cornell	16	14	2	0	28	75	23	22	19	3	0	107	39
#8Harvard	16	11	4	1	23	51	24	22	14	7	1	75	42
#10Dartmouth	16	10	4	2	22	39	26	22	14	6	2	66	47
Clarkson	16	10	4	2	22	51	23	28	16	7	5	82	51
Quinnipiac	16	10	4	2	22	42	30	27	15	10	2	65	59
St. Lawrence	16	9	5	2	20	47	35	27	15	8	4	85	63
Princeton	16	7	7	2	16	35	28	23	9	10	4	49	48
Brown	16	4	8	4	12	22	42	23	7	9	7	50	51
Rensselaer	16	5	9	2	12	34	44	28	8	16	4	63	83
Colgate	16	3	12	1	7	26	56	27	8	18	1	57	81
Union	16	2	12	2	6	20	47	28	4	20	4	48	89
Yale	16	1	15	0	2	14	78	23	1	22	0	22	118
Championship: To be determined † indicates conference regular season champion * indicates conference tournament champion National rankings: Conference rankings: Updated February 1st, 2012

=== In-season honors ===
==== Players of the week ====
Week	Player of the week
October 3	Alisa Harrison, Rensselaer
October 10	Stefanie Thomson, Union
October 17	Brittany Phillips, Colgate
October 24	Kelly Foley, Dartmouth
October 31	Brianne Jenner, Cornell
November 7	Denna Laing, Princeton
November 14	Ali Winkel, Dartmouth
November 21	Kelly Babstock, Quinnipiac
November 28	Sally Komarek, Dartmouth
December 4	Jamie Lee Rattray, Clarkson
December 11	Jillian Dempsey, Harvard
January 16	Camille Dumais, Dartmouth
January 23	Rylee Smith, St. Lawrence
January 30	Jenna Baribeau, Clarkson
February 6	Jillian Dempsey, Harvard
February 13	Brianne Jenner, Cornell
February 20	
February 27	Jillian Dempsey, Harvard
March 6	
March 13	

==== Defensive players of the week ====
Week	Player of the week
October 3	Victoria Vigilanti, Quinnipiac
October 10	Ali Svoboda, Rensselaer
October 17	Erica Howe, Clarkson
October 24	Erica Howe, Clarkson
October 31	Lindsay Holdcroft, Dartmouth
November 7	Kate Gallagher, Union
November 14	Erica Howe, Clarkson
November 21	Laura Bellamy, Harvard
November 28	Amanda Mazzotta, Cornell
December 4	Rachel Weber, Princeton
December 11	Victoria Vigilanti, Quinnipiac
January 16	Lauren Slebodnick, Cornell
January 23	Amanda Mazzotta, Cornell
January 30	Laura Bellamy, Harvard
February 6	Kimberley Sass, Colgate
February 13	Lauren Slebodnik, Cornell
February 20	
February 27	Victoria Vigilanti, Quinnipiac
March 6	
March 13	

==== Rookies of the week ====
Week	Player of the week
October 3	Kelly O'Brien, Rensselaer
October 10	Kelly O'Brien, Rensselaer
October 17	Melissa Kueber, Colgate
October 24	Christine Valente, Union
October 31	Jillian Saulnier, Cornell
November 7	Jillian Saulnier, Cornell
November 14	Eleeza Cox, Rensselaer
November 21	Emily Fulton, Cornell
November 28	Chelsea Laden, Quinnipiac
December 4	Brianne Mahoney, Princeton
December 11	Samantha Reber, Harvard
January 16	Hillary Crowe, Harvard
January 23	Carmen MacDonald, St. Lawrence
January 30	Eleeza Cox, RPI
February 6	Samantha Reber, Harvard
February 13	Jillian Saulnier, Cornell
February 20	
February 27	Nicole Kosta, Quinnipiac
March 6	
March 13	

=== Monthly awards ===
==== Player of the month ====
Month	Player of the month
October 2011	Jamie Lee Rattray, Clarkson Golden Knights
November 2011	Kelly Babstock, Quinnipiac
December 2011	
January 2012	

==== Defensive Player of the month ====
Month	Player of the month
October 2011	Erica Howe, Clarkson
November 2011	Erica Howe, Clarkson
December 2011	
January 2012	

==== Rookie of the month ====
Month	Player of the month
October 2011	Jillian Saulnier, Cornell Big Red
November 2011	Jillian Saulnier, Cornell
December 2011	
January 2012	

== See also ==
- National Collegiate Women's Ice Hockey Championship
- 2010–11 ECAC women's ice hockey season
- 2011–12 WCHA women's ice hockey season
- 2011–12 Hockey East women's ice hockey season
- 2011–12 CHA women's ice hockey season
- ECAC women's ice hockey
