= 2011–12 NCAA Division I women's ice hockey season =

NCAA ice hockey season

- NCAA tournament: 2012
- National championship: Amsoil Arena
- NCAA champion: Minnesota Golden Gophers

The 2011–12 NCAA Division I women's ice hockey season began in October 2011, and ended with the 2012 NCAA Division I Women's Ice Hockey Tournament's championship game in March 2012.

== Off season ==
- June 13: Mercyhurst Lakers assistant coach Paul Colontino has left the club to become head coach of the Robert Morris Colonials. He is the third head coach in Colonials history, after the resignation of Nate Handrahan, who left to assume the head coaching position at Ohio State.
- July 2011: The Lindenwood Lady Lions ice hockey program announced the 2011–12 schedule as the program's first season of NCAA competition as part of the university's transition from NAIA to NCAA. seven games against NCAA Division III; and five games against former ACHA Division I rivals Robert Morris (IL) and Grand Valley State
- Sept. 6: Robert DeGregorio, Commissioner for College Hockey America (CHA), announced that the Penn State Nittany Lions have been accepted into the CHA. The Nittany Lions will officially join the conference starting with the 2012–13 season.

=== Wayne State ===
- May 27: CHA member Wayne State University has discontinued sponsorship of the women's ice hockey program. The decision was based on the continuing reductions in the state of Michigan's appropriations to higher education. The Wayne State Warriors women's ice hockey program was the only Division I women's program in Michigan.

==== Transfers ====
Player	Position	New team
Alyssa Baldin	Forward	Windsor Lancers (CIS)
Gina Buquet	Forward	Mercyhurst Lakers
Cari Coen	Forward/Defense	St. Cloud State Huskies
Veronique Laramee-Paquette	Left wing	Concordia Stingers (CIS)
Jill Szandzik	Defense	Mercyhurst Lakers

== Season outlook ==
=== Preseason polls ===
- USCHO.com Division I Women's Poll

Rank	Team	Points	First place votes
1	Wisconsin	140	14
2	Boston University	116	
3	Cornell	111	
4	Minnesota	96	
5	Boston College	85	
6	Minnesota-Duluth	75	
7	North Dakota	44	
8	Mercyhurst	42	
9	Quinnipiac	17	
10 (tie)	Dartmouth	12	
10 (tie)	Providence	12	

== Exhibition ==
=== CIS Exhibition ===
Date	NCAA school	CIS school	Score	NCAA goal scorers
Sept. 17	Mercyhurst	Wilfrid Laurier University	10–2	Bailey Bram (3), Kristine Grenier (3), Shelby Bram, Christine Bestland, Gina Buquet, Candice Styles
Sept. 23	North Dakota	Manitoba	ND, 11–0	Sara Dagenais, Mary Loken, Alyssa Wiebe (2), Monique Weber, Jocelyne Lamoureux (2), Andrea Dalen, Allison Parizek, Monique Weber, Ashley Holmes
Sept. 23	Ohio State	Wilfrid Laurier	Ohio State, 3–1	Kayla Sullivan, Danielle Gagne, Melissa Feste
Sep 24	North Dakokta	Manitoba	ND, 10–0	Alyssa Wiebe, Jocelyne Lamoureux (2), Josefine Jacobsen (3), Monique Lamoureux, Monique Weber, Andrea Dalen, Michelle Karvinen
Sat, Sep 24	Robert Morris	Waterloo	RMU, 4–1	Katelyn Scott, Rebecca Vint, Thea Imbrogno, Brianna Delaney
Oct 1	Vermont	McGill	McGill, 3–2	Delia McNally, Meghan Huertas

- September 17, 2011: Mercyhurst Lakers senior Bailey Bram registered a hat trick to go with her three assists, as the Lakers trounced the Wilfrid Laurier Golden Hawks women's ice hockey program by a 10–2 tally. Her sister, Shelby Bram scored one goal while freshman Kristine Grenier also registered a hat trick in the match. Kelley Steadman contributed with four assists.
- September 24: Freshman Josefine Jakobsen recorded a hat-trick as the North Dakota Fighting Sioux women's ice hockey program defeated the Manitoba Bisons women's ice hockey program by a 10–0 tally. Of note, the European freshmen that combined for 11 points in the game. Michelle Karvinen had four points, while Andrea Dalen had three points.

=== CWHL Exhibition ===
Date	NCAA school	Opponent	Score	NCAA goal scorers
Oct. 25	Cornell	Brampton Thunder (CWHL)	Cornell, 6–0	Jillian Saulnier (2), Jessica Campbell, Olivia Cook, Kendice Ogilvie, Catherine White
Nov. 2	Mercyhurst	Brampton Thunder (CWHL)	Brampton, 3–1	Bailey Bram

=== PWHL Exhibition ===
Date	NCAA school	Opponent	Score	NCAA goal scorers
Sept 24	Clarkson	Whitby Wolves (PWHL)	Clarkson, 6–0	Christine Lambert, Vanessa Gagnon, Brittany Styner, Carly Mercer, Jamie Lee Rattray, Danielle Boudreau

== News and notes ==
=== September ===
- September 14: The Lindenwood Lady Lions ice hockey program officially submitted an application to join College Hockey America (CHA) for the 2012–13 season.
- On September 25, 2011, Hilary Knight of the Wisconsin Badgers women's ice hockey program scored her fifth career hat trick in a 13–0 defeat of the Lindenwood Lions. In addition, Brianna Decker scored her third career hat trick. The 13 goals scored by the Badgers were tied for third most in the NCAA women's ice hockey all-time list for most goals scored in a game by a team.

=== October ===
- Throughout the month of October, the WCHA women's ice hockey eight member teams will participate in causes to support Breast Cancer Awareness Month. Each team will wear a patch on their jerseys, encouraging Breast Cancer Awareness. Spectators are encouraged to wear pink clothing.
- October 7–8: Robert Morris Colonials freshman Katie Fergus accumulated three points in her NCAA debut with one goal and two assists. Against the Lindenwood Lions, she got her first-collegiate point fewer than nine minutes into the opening period. Later in the game, she scored her first goal as the Colonials were on the penalty kill. In the second game versus Lindenwood, she earned her first multi-goal game. Fergus became one of just two freshmen in Colonials history to register multi-point performances in the first two games of a season. Fergus finished the series versus Lindenwood by scoring three goals and two assists five points. In addition, she had eight shots to complement a +5 plus/minus.
- October 7–8: In a pair of victories over the Lindenwood Lions, Colgate Raiders skater Brittany Phillips accumulated a total of 10 points. In the 7–2 victory on October 7, she notched two goals, while logging an assist. One of the goals was the game-winning goal. The following day, she had seven points (two goals, five assists) in an 8–2 win. Of the four goals she scored, two were power play goals. Her seven points ranked second in program history for most points in one game. In addition, the five assists ranked second for most assists in one game. In addition, Melissa Kueber registered six points in the sweep. On October 8, she led the team with four goals scored in an 8–2 triumph over the Lions. She also notched an assist. The four tallies tied for first in program history for most scores in one game.
- October 14, 2011: Ohio State skater Laura McIntosh notched her first goal of the season to give the Buckeyes a 2–1 lead. Said goal would stand as the game-winner. In addition, she picked up an assist on a Hokey Langan goal. The assist made McIntosh Ohio State's all-time leader in career points against WCHA opponents. She surpassed Jana Harrigan's 110 league points set in 2006.
- October 21: In its WCHA home opener, the top line of the Fighting Sioux combined for thirteen points as they bested the Ohio State Buckeyes by an 11–1 margin. Monique Lamoureux-Kolls tied a North Dakota record with a 5-point game. In the contest, 13 different Sioux skaters registered at least one point. Michelle Karvinen scored a hat trick and logged one assist for four points. In addition, Josefine Jakobsen and Jocelyne Lamoureux each had 4-point games. Several program records were broken in the game including: most goals scored in a game (11), largest margin of victory (10), and largest margin of victory over a conference opponent (10).
- October 21–22: On October 21, Robert Morris Colonials freshman Rebecca Vint recorded four points, including her first game-winning goal versus RPI. She became just the second Colonial ever to tally at least four points in a game away from home. She scored twice within the game's opening eight minutes. Her performance on the 21st marked her third multi-goal effort in her first five collegiate games. The following game, she registered a goal and an assist, and extended her goal scoring streak by scoring a goal in her sixth consecutive game. It marked the first time that any Colonials skater scored in any six consecutive contests in a single season.
- October 22: Clarkson Golden Knights women's ice hockey sophomore forward Jamie Lee Rattray notched two goals for the Golden Knights in a 2–1 decision over the visiting New Hampshire Wildcats women's ice hockey program. The win helped the Golden Knights extend their unbeaten streak to six games. In addition, it was the 150th victory in the history of the program, dating back to the 2003–04 season. With the victory, the Golden Knights all-time mark is 150–111–38.
- October 25: In a 6–2 triumph over the Colgate Raiders, freshman Jillian Saulnier scored four goals in her NCAA debut. It was the first four-goal game for Cornell since Jessica Campbell scored four against Robert Morris in the second game of the 2010–11 season. The Big Red held a 64–12 advantage in shots on goal while also winning faceoffs by a margin of 53–27. The 64 shots were the most the Big Red took since a February 6, 2000, contest against Union.
- October 28–29: The series versus the Mercyhurst Lakers women's ice hockey program marked the first time that the Lindenwood Lady Lions ice hockey program hosted an NCAA Division I opponent in their home arena. Mercyhurst would win the October 28 match by a 7–0 tally, in which Lakers freshman Shelby Bram would score her first career NCAA goal. The October 29 contest saw Mercyhurst emerge as the victor in a 14–0 whitewash.

=== November ===
- November 1: For the third consecutive contest, the Cornell Big Red scored at least nine goals in one game. Senior captain Chelsea Karpenko appeared in her 100th career game, as Jillian Saulnier led all Big Red players with two goals and three assists in a 9–2 triumph over the Syracuse Orange women's ice hockey program.
- November 4: Emilie Arseneault scored a short handed goal late into the second period to give the Union Dutchwomen a 2–1 conference victory over the Clarkson Golden Knights women's ice hockey program. It was the Dutchwomen's first ECAC win since the 2009–2010 season, and only their second ECAC win since 2004.
- November 18–19: In a pair of victories over the Yale Bulldogs, Hillary Pattenden won two more games to give her a career total of 87. The total is four shy of career leader, Jessie Vetter of Wisconsin. In the 9–1 victory on November 18, she stopped 14 of 15 Bulldogs shots. The following day, she stopped 21 of 23 shots in a 6–2 victory. The goal she allowed on November 18 snapped a consecutive scoreless streak of 206:36. Previous to the goal, she had not allowed a goal since the third period of a 5–4 win over the MSU Mavericks (on October 8). In addition, Lakers forward Bailey Bram increased her scoring pace by notching five goals to go with five assists in two victories over the Yale Bulldogs. In the 9–1 win on November 18, Bram registered two goals and logged two assists. The following day, she had a hand in all six goals (three goals and three assists) in the Lakers 6–2 win. Bram earned her fifth career hat trick and second of the season. In the two game set versus the Bulldogs, her plus minus rating was a +6, while her six-point game on November 19 was the second time in the season that she registered at least six points in a game. Her first was a career-high seven points in a win over the Lindenwood Lady Lions. Statistically, she logged 14 goals and 11 assists in the first 10 games she played of the season.
- Nov. 18–19: Carolyne Prevost of the Wisconsin Badgers became the 17th player in program history to record 100 career points. In a victory over RPI, she netted the first goal of the game for Wisconsin. She would also record an assist in the match. The following day, Prevost recorded six points in the finale against RPI. It was a team-high for any Wisconsin skater this season. She scored two goals, including the game winner, and helped on four other goals to establish a new career high for most points in one game.
- November 19: With a second period goal versus the Colgate Raiders, Kelly Babstock of the Quinnipiac Bobcats became the program's all-time leading scorer. In just her second season, Babstock surpassed Vicki Graham, who finished with 73 career points, after the 2006–07 season. Babstock reached the milestone in her 50th career game.
- November 25: Natalie Spooner scored four goals for the third time in her NCAA career, including a natural hat trick as the Buckeyes enjoyed a home-ice conference victory over Minnesota Duluth. She scored all four goals as the final score was 4–1 in the Buckeyes favor. It was the second time in the 2011–12 campaign that she scored four goals in a game. The natural hat trick (three consecutive goals) was scored in the second period as the Buckeyes faced a 1–0 deficit against the Bulldogs. The eventual game-winner was scored at 10:56 of the second period. The hat trick was the fifth of her collegiate career. The four goal performance moved Spooner to fourth overall on the Buckeye career points list with 129. Spooner is now four goals away from tying Jeni Creary's Ohio State record of 86 career goals.
- November 26: Quinnipiac Bobcats player Kelly Babstock led all skaters in points at the 2011 Nutmeg Classic with four (one goal, three assists). With the two assists in the championship game, Babstock earned the 39 and 40 assists of her career, surpassing Caitlin Peters as the all-time assist leader in Bobcats history. Breann Frykas scored the game-winning goal as the Bobcats bested the Robert Morris Colonials by a 3–2 tally. The victory in the Nutmeg Classic was also the 200th career victory of head coach Rick Seeley.

=== December ===
- December 10: In a 3–2 overtime victory versus Boston College, Hillary Pattenden made a career high 48 saves to earn the 91st victory of her NCAA career, tying former Wisconsin goaltender Jessie Vetter for the NCAA Division I record.
- December 10: In a WCHA contest versus Bemidji State, Hilary Knight produced four points, giving her a career total of 239. She has now surpassed Meghan Duggan's 238 career points, to become the Wisconsin Badgers all-time leading point scorer. For her efforts, Knight was recognized as the WCHA Player of the Week.
- December 14: In a 9–0 defeat of the Lindenwood Lady Lions, Mercyhurst goaltender Hillary Pattenden broke Jessie Vetter's record for career NCAA wins, by notching her 92nd career victory. Forward Bailey Bram scored two goals and added four assists while Kelley Steadman scored the game-winning goal.

=== January ===
- January 10: The Dartmouth Big Green and Providence Friars played each other in an outdoor game at Fenway Park in Boston. Providence skater Brooke Simpson scored her first career NCAA goal. With 1:14 remaining in regulation, Big Green forward Camille Dumais scored the game-winning goal on Providence netminder Genevieve Lacasse as the Big Green prevailed by a 3–2 mark.
- On Friday, January 20, 2012, Brianna Delaney scored in the third period of a 4–2 loss to CHA rival Mercyhurst. After being hooked, she scored on a wrist shot top shelf as she was falling to the ice. With the score, Delaney reached three milestones. She became just the second Robert Morris player to reach the 50 goal plateau. In addition, the score marked her 20th point of the season. It made her the first player in school history to post four 20 point seasons. Said goal also marked the 113th point of her career, the most by any Robert Morris women's hockey player in school history.
- January 27: Three Buckeyes reached milestones in a 6–2 upset of North Dakota. Laura McIntosh finished the game with three assists. Natalie Spooner totaled two goals and Hokey Langan finished with two assists. McIntosh's three helpers moved her into a tie for the all-time lead on Ohio State's all-time career points list. Her 160 career points are now tied with former Buckeye Jana Harrigan. The two goals by Spooner were both on the power-play (increasing her season total to seven). With the goals, Spooner reached the 150 career point plateau, moving her into third all-time in Ohio State history. The two assists from Langan helped her reach the 100-point milestone, only the eighth Buckeyes player to reach the mark.
- January 27–28: Wisconsin posted a two-game sweep of Bemidji State. In the first game, Madison Packer scored the game-winning goal in overtime as the Badgers prevailed by a 3–2 score. The following day, Hilary Knight notched her first goal since Dec 10 with 7:38 left in the third period. Said goal would stand as the game winner on Fill the Bowl nights. A record crowd of 12,402 attended the Kohl Center. Alex Rigby made 28 saves to obtain her sixth shutout of the campaign. Her rival between the pipes, Bemidji State netminder Zuzana Tomcikova made 32 saves. Wisconsin is the only team to sweep the season series from the Beavers during the 2011–12 season. The previous record for most fans to watch a women's college hockey game at the Kohl Center was 10,668. That record was set at the Kohl Center on January 29, 2011.

=== February ===
- February 3–4: In a sweep over CHA opponent Syracuse, Rebecca Vint led all Robert Morris Colonials skaters in points. In the first game, she scored the game-winning goal to break the Colonials’ single-season record for points in one season. In the 4–3 win versus the Orange, it was Vint's fourth game-winning goal of the season (a Colonials record). The following day, Vint tied the Colonials’ single-sea¬son mark for goals in a 5–2 triumph. In addition, she assisted on the game-winning goal to notch her 10th multi-point effort of the season.
- February 4: Jillian Dempsey was one goal short of tying the NCAA record for goals in a game, netting five against Princeton. With Harvard behind 1–0 in the second period, she netted three straight markers for a natural hat trick. Late in the second, she added her fourth of the frame. Dempsey recorded a power-play and a short-handed goal also. Her fifth goal came with 41 seconds remaining in the contest.
- February 4: The Ohio State Buckeyes defeated No. 9 Minnesota Duluth by a 4–3 mark at the AMSOIL Arena. Laura McIntosh broke the Buckeyes all-time scoring record with three points, while Natalie Spooner notched a hat trick for the Buckeyes. Prior to the game, McIntosh was tied with Jana Harrigan with 160 career points. She now is the all-time leaders with 163 points. The hat trick by Spooner was her third of the season (and sixth in her career). Spooner stands third overall in career points with 156.
- February 10: Rebecca Vint notched her fifth game-winning goal of the season, a new Robert Morris Colonials record. In addition, said goal also broke the school record for overall goals in a season. In the third period, she logged another goal to register her sixth multi-goal game of the campaign. The following day, Vint assisting on both RMU goals to break the single-season assist record. With the two assists, she also became the first Colonial to notch 40 points in a season. Her five game-winning goals leads all skaters in the CHA.
- February 17: Northeastern ended their 13-year Beanpot championship drought when Casey Pickett scored the game-winning goal in overtime past Boston University goaltender Kerrin Sperry. The Huskies prevailed by a 4–3 tally with the other Huskies goals scored by Kendall Coyne, Lucie Povova, and Sonia St. Martin. Huskies goaltender Florence Schelling made a season best 43 saves to claim her 17th win of the season.
- February 18: In a contest versus the Robert Morris Colonials, Hillary Pattenden competed in the final regular season game of her NCAA career. Heading into the game, she had 99 career regular season victories, and was aiming to be the first NCAA women's goaltender with 100 career wins. With a 4–3 Mercyhurst lead late in the third period, Colonials skater Dayna Newsom recorded a game-tying goal, as both teams skated to a 4–4 final score.
- February 18: In a 7–1 victory over MSU-Mankato, Haley Irwin netted the 200th point of her NCAA career. She became the sixth-ever Bulldog to score 200 career points as she registered a power play goal in the first period.

== Regular season ==
=== Standings ===
2011–12 College Hockey America standings
	Conference							Overall					
	GP	PTS	W	L	T	GF	GA	GP	W	L	T	GF	GA
#6 Mercyhurst†	6	9	4	1	1	24	16	24	18	5	1	118	47
Robert Morris*	6	7	3	2	1	9	9	24	14	8	2	73	44
Niagara	6	5	2	3	1	12	14	27	9	12	6	64	72
Syracuse	6	3	0	3	3	11	17	28	9	16	3	63	89
Wayne State	0	0	0	0	0	0	0	0	0	0	0	0	0
Championship: Robert Morris † indicates conference regular season champion * indicates conference tournament champion National rankings: Conference rankings: Updated February 2nd, 2012

- Rankings based on number of points in the conference
- Wayne State was scheduled to play in the 2011–12 season but the women's ice hockey program was dropped

2011–12 Eastern College Athletic Conference standings
	Conference							Overall					
	GP	W	L	T	PTS	GF	GA	GP	W	L	T	GF	GA
#3Cornell	16	14	2	0	28	75	23	22	19	3	0	107	39
#8Harvard	16	11	4	1	23	51	24	22	14	7	1	75	42
#10Dartmouth	16	10	4	2	22	39	26	22	14	6	2	66	47
Clarkson	16	10	4	2	22	51	23	28	16	7	5	82	51
Quinnipiac	16	10	4	2	22	42	30	27	15	10	2	65	59
St. Lawrence	16	9	5	2	20	47	35	27	15	8	4	85	63
Princeton	16	7	7	2	16	35	28	23	9	10	4	49	48
Brown	16	4	8	4	12	22	42	23	7	9	7	50	51
Rensselaer	16	5	9	2	12	34	44	28	8	16	4	63	83
Colgate	16	3	12	1	7	26	56	27	8	18	1	57	81
Union	16	2	12	2	6	20	47	28	4	20	4	48	89
Yale	16	1	15	0	2	14	78	23	1	22	0	22	118
Championship: To be determined † indicates conference regular season champion * indicates conference tournament champion National rankings: Conference rankings: Updated February 1st, 2012

2011–12 Hockey East Association standings
	Conference							Overall					
	GP	W	L	T	PTS	GF	GA	GP	W	L	T	GF	GA
#4 Boston College	16	11	3	2	24	41	29	28	18	7	3	76	55
#7 Northeastern	16	11	3	2	24	52	23	28	17	6	3	88	42
Boston University	16	9	7	0	18	46	38	28	15	12	1	78	74
Providence	16	8	7	1	17	47	36	29	11	15	3	74	70
Maine	15	7	6	2	16	42	37	27	13	8	6	81	65
New Hampshire	15	4	9	2	10	27	51	28	10	15	3	62	100
Vermont	15	3	10	2	8	26	50	26	4	16	6	47	95
Connecticut	15	2	10	3	7	20	37	28	3	18	7	42	81
Championship: To Be Determined † indicates conference regular season champion * indicates conference tournament champion National rankings: Conference rankings: Updated February 2nd, 2012

*Rankings based on number of points in the conference

2011–12 Western Collegiate Hockey Association standings
	Conference								Overall					
	GP	W	L	T	SW	PTS	GF	GA	GP	W	L	T	GF	GA
#1 Wisconsin†	28	23	3	2	1	72	113	44	37	31	4	2	170	53
#2 Minnesota*	28	21	5	2	1	66	113	43	37	30	5	2	167	50
#6 North Dakota	28	16	9	3	2	53	116	75	36	22	11	3	154	89
#9 Minnesota Duluth	28	15	12	1	1	47	91	61	36	21	13	1	121	77
Ohio State	28	13	14	1	1	41	75	96	36	16	16	4	99	115
Bemidji State	28	11	15	2	0	35	70	73	37	17	17	3	101	85
St. Cloud State	28	4	24	0	0	12	32	150	36	5	29	2	37	130
Minnesota State	28	3	24	1	0	10	37	105	36	7	28	1	64	133
Championship: Minnesota † indicates conference regular season champion * indicates conference tournament champion National rankings: Conference rankings: Updated March 23, 2012

=== Season Tournaments ===
==== Nutmeg Classic ====
The Nutmeg Classic will be contested on November 25 and 26.

Date	Schools	Score	Notes
Nov 25	Connecticut vs. Quinnipiac	4–2, Quinnipiac	Game winning goal scored by Erica Uden Johansson
Nov 25	Robert Morris vs. Yale	1–0, Robert Morris	Game winning goal scored by Thea Imbrogno
Nov 26	Connecticut vs. Yale		
Nov 26	Quinnipiac vs. Robert Morris	3–2, Quinnipiac	Breann Frykas scored the game-winning goal

==== Beanpot ====
The Beanpot involved Boston College, Boston University, Northeastern and Harvard.

Date	Schools	Score	Notes
Jan 31	Boston College vs. Northeastern	2–1, Northeastern (Shootout)	Rachel Llanes and Brittany Esposito scored in the shootout for Northeastern
Jan 31	Boston University vs. Harvard	5–2, BU	Game winning goal scored by Marie-Philip Poulin
Feb 7	Boston College vs. Harvard (consolation game)		
Feb 7	Boston University vs. Northeastern (championship game)		

== Awards and honors ==
=== Patty Kazmaier Memorial Award Nominees ===
Name	Position	Class	Team
Christine Bestland	F	So.	Mercyhurst College
Blake Bolden	D	Jr.	Boston College
Megan Bozek	D	Jr.	Univ. of Minnesota
Bailey Bram	F	Sr.	Mercyhurst College
Alex Carpenter	F	Fr.	Boston College
Kendall Coyne	F	Fr.	Northeastern Univ.
Brianna Decker	F	Jr.	Univ. of Wisconsin
Jillian Dempsey	F	Jr.	Harvard Univ.
Laura Fortino	D	Jr.	Cornell Univ.
Thea Imbrogno	F	So.	Robert Morris Univ.
Haley Irwin	F	Sr.	Univ. of Minnesota Duluth
Brianne Jenner	F	So.	Cornell Univ.
Rebecca Johnston	F	Sr.	Cornell Univ.
Amanda Kessel	F	So.	Univ. of Minnesota
Hilary Knight	F	Sr.	Univ. of Wisconsin
Jocelyne Lamoureux	F	Jr.	Univ. of North Dakota
Monique Lamoureux-Kolls	F/D	Jr.	Univ. of North Dakota
Josephine Pucci	D	Jr.	Harvard Univ.
Jamie Lee Rattray	F	So.	Clarkson Univ.
Noora Raty	G	Jr.	Univ. of Minnesota
Alex Rigsby	G	So.	Univ. of Wisconsin
Lauriane Rougeau	D	Jr.	Cornell Univ.
Kelly Sabatine	F	Jr.	St. Lawrence Univ.
Florence Schelling	G	Sr.	Northeastern Univ.
Jen Schoullis	F	Sr.	Univ. of Minnesota
Natalie Spooner	F	Sr.	Ohio State Univ.
Kelley Steadman	F	Jr.	Mercyhurst College
Zuzana Tomcikova	G	Sr.	Bemidji State Univ.
Rebecca Vint	F	Fr.	Robert Morris Univ.
Jenn Wakefield	F	Sr.	Boston Univ.

=== Patty Kazmaier Memorial Award Finalists ===
Name	Position	Class	Team
Bailey Bram	F	Sr.	Mercyhurst College
Brianna Decker	F	Jr.	Univ. of Wisconsin
Laura Fortino	D	Jr.	Cornell Univ.
Rebecca Johnston	F	Sr.	Cornell Univ.
Amanda Kessel	F	So.	Univ. of Minnesota
Hilary Knight	F	Sr.	Univ. of Wisconsin
Jocelyne Lamoureux	F	Jr.	Univ. of North Dakota
Monique Lamoureux-Kolls	F/D	Jr.	Univ. of North Dakota
Florence Schelling	G	Sr.	Northeastern Univ.
Natalie Spooner	F	Sr.	Ohio State Univ.

=== Patty Kazmaier Memorial Award Top 3 ===
Name	Position	Class	Team
Brianna Decker	F	Jr.	Univ. of Wisconsin
Jocelyne Lamoureux	F	Jr.	Univ. of North Dakota
Florence Schelling	G	Sr.	Northeastern Univ.

=== All-America honors ===
==== First team ====
- Florence Schelling, Goalie, Northeastern
- Megan Bozek, Defenseman, Minnesota
- Laura Fortino, Defenseman, Cornell
- Brianna Decker, Forward, Wisconsin
- Rebecca Johnston, Forward, Cornell
- Jocelyne Lamoureux, Forward, North Dakota

==== Second team ====
- Zuzana Tomčíková, Goalie, Bemidji State
- Monique Lamoureux-Kolls, Defenseman, North Dakota
- Lauriane Rougeau, Defenseman, Cornell
- Amanda Kessel, Forward, Minnesota
- Hilary Knight, Forward, Wisconsin
- Natalie Spooner, Forward, Ohio State

=== Hockey East 10th Anniversary Team ===
On February 29, 2012, Hockey East named its 10th Anniversary Team, along with a group of Honorable Mention players.

Position	Player	HEA school	Final season
Goalie	Chanda Gunn	Northeastern	2004
Goalie	Molly Schaus	Boston College	2011
Defense	Cristin Allen	Connecticut	2010
Defense	Kacey Bellamy	New Hampshire	2009
Defense	Martine Garland	New Hampshire	2008
Defense	Kelly Halcisak	Providence	2004
Forward	Sam Haber	New Hampshire	2009
Forward	Kelly Paton	New Hampshire	2010
Forward	Kelli Stack	Boston College	2011
Forward	Karen Thatcher	Providence	2006
Forward	Jennifer Wakefield	Boston University	2012

==== Honorable mention ====
Position	Player	HEA school	Final season
Goalie	Florence Schelling	Northeastern	2012
Defense	Courtney Birchard	New Hampshire	2011
Defense	Kristin Gigliotti	Providence	2007
Defense	Maggie Taverna	Boston College	2009
Defense	Tara Watchorn	Boston University	2012
Forward	Jaclyn Hawkins	Connecticut	2008
Forward	Jenn Hitchcock	New Hampshire	2008
Forward	Allie Thunstrom	Boston College	2010

== Postseason tournaments ==
=== Hockey East championship game ===
Date	Teams	Score
03–04–12	Boston University vs. Providence	2–1 (2 OT)

== See also ==
- National Collegiate Women's Ice Hockey Championship
- 2011–12 CHA women's ice hockey season
- 2011–12 ECAC women's ice hockey season
- 2011–12 Hockey East women's ice hockey season
- 2011–12 WCHA women's ice hockey season
