= Brianne Jenner =

Canadian ice hockey player (born 1991)

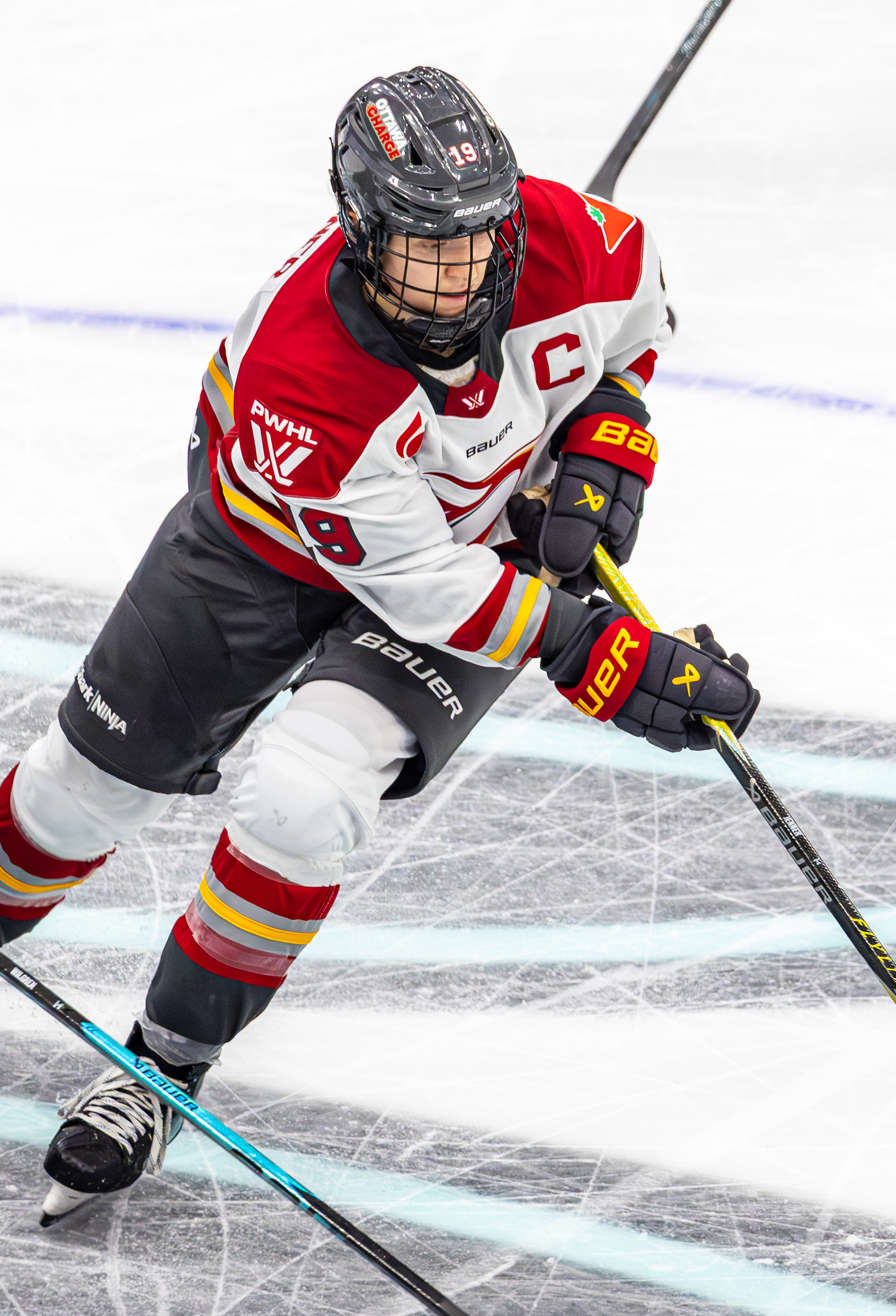
- Jenner with Ottawa Charge in 2025
- Born: May 4, 1991 (age 35) Oakville, Ontario, Canada
- Height: 5 ft 9 in (175 cm)
- Weight: 157 lb (71 kg; 11 st 3 lb)
- Position: Forward
- Shoots: Right
- PWHL team Former teams: Hamilton Havoc: Ottawa Charge; Calgary Inferno; Mississauga Chiefs; Burlington Barracudas
- National team: Canada
- Playing career: 2008–present
Medal record
Olympic Games
Gold medal – first place	2014 Sochi	Team
Gold medal – first place	2022 Beijing	Team
Silver medal – second place	2018 Pyeongchang	Team
Silver medal – second place	2026 Milano Cortina	Team
World Championships
Gold medal – first place	2012 United States
Gold medal – first place	2021 Canada
Gold medal – first place	2022 Denmark
Gold medal – first place	2024 United States
Silver medal – second place	2013 Canada
Silver medal – second place	2015 Sweden
Silver medal – second place	2016 Canada
Silver medal – second place	2017 United States
Silver medal – second place	2023 Canada
Silver medal – second place	2025 Czechia
Bronze medal – third place	2019 Finland
World U18 Championships
Silver medal – second place	2008 Canada
Silver medal – second place	2009 Germany

Brianne Alexandra Jenner (born May 4, 1991) is a Canadian professional ice hockey player and a member of the Hamilton Havoc and Canada women's national ice hockey team. Previously, she was captain for the Ottawa Charge of the Professional Women's Hockey League (PWHL).

Jenner is a four-time Olympic medallist, having won gold medals at Sochi 2014 and Beijing 2022, and silver medals at PyeongChang 2018 and Milano Cortina 2026. At the Beijing 2022 Winter Olympics, she was named tournament MVP after tying the Olympic record with nine goals in a single tournament, adding five assists for 14 points. She has won 11 medals at the IIHF Women's World Championship since her debut in 2012, including four gold medals (2012, 2021, 2022, 2024), six silver medals (2013, 2015, 2016, 2017, 2023, 2025), and one bronze medal (2019). Jenner scored both goals in Canada's 2-1 gold medal victory over the United States at the 2022 IIHF Women's World Championship.

Before joining the PWHL, Jenner was a founding board member of the Professional Women's Hockey Players Association (PWHPA) and helped launch the organization following the collapse of the Canadian Women's Hockey League in 2019. She was one of three initial free agent signings made by PWHL Ottawa when the league launched in 2023, and was named the team's captain in December 2023. Jenner previously won two Clarkson Cup championships with the Calgary Inferno in 2016 and 2019, serving as team captain and scoring twice in the 2016 championship game.

During her collegiate career at Cornell University from 2010 to 2015, Jenner was a two-time ECAC Hockey Player of the Year (2013, 2015), two-time Ivy League Player of the Year (2013, 2015), and two-time finalist for the Patty Kazmaier Memorial Award, given to the top player in NCAA Division I women's ice hockey.

== Early life ==
Born and raised in Oakville, Ontario to parents Dave and Brenda Jenner, Brianne learned to skate at age two on an outdoor rink that her father built in their front yard. She began playing organized hockey at age three with the help of her father and uncle, who ran their own youth league. Jenner played minor hockey in St. Catharines, Ontario. Before focusing exclusively on hockey, she also played basketball and soccer.

Jenner attended Appleby College for high school, where she served as captain of the hockey team. During her high school years, she played junior hockey in the Provincial Women's Hockey League with the Stoney Creek Sabres.

Jenner played with the Mississauga Chiefs during the 2008–09 Canadian Women's Hockey League season, followed by a season with the Burlington Barracudas. She was named captain of Team Ontario Red at the 2008 National Women's Under-18 Championship, scoring the game-winning goal in double overtime of the gold medal game. In December 2007, she was recognized as the Toronto Star High School Athlete of the Week.

== Playing career ==
=== College ===
Jenner played for the Cornell Big Red from 2010 to 2015. In her freshman season (2010–11), she made an immediate impact, finishing tied for the team lead in scoring with 50 points. She was named Ivy League Rookie of the Year after finishing second in NCAA freshman scoring, and earned First Team All-ECAC Hockey and First Team All-Ivy League honors. She was also nominated for the Patty Kazmaier Award, given to the top player in women's college hockey. On October 29 and 30, 2010, Jenner played a role in both victories for the Cornell Big Red ice hockey team. On October 29, she had three assists at Quinnipiac. The following day, she scored a pair of goals and added an assist at Princeton. Jenner helped Cornell reach the NCAA Frozen Four in both her freshman and sophomore seasons.

During three games from February 7 to February 11, 2012, Jenner led her team with eight points. Versus nationally ranked Mercyhurst, Jenner had a goal and an assist in a February 7 victory over Mercyhurst. In a 5–0 shutout win over the Brown Bears (on February 10), Jenner garnered two assists from two goals. On February 11, Jenner scored the game-winning goal versus the Yale Bulldogs that clinched the ECAC Hockey regular-season championship. She also added another goal and recorded her 30th assist of the season in that game.

In her junior season (2012–13), Jenner had a breakout year, recording 35 goals and 35 assists for 70 points in 32 games. Her 70 points set a Cornell single-season record that still stands. She led the nation in goals per game and was second in points per game, earning ECAC Hockey Player of the Year, Ivy League Player of the Year, First Team All-American, and Cornell MVP honors. She also tied the Cornell single-season record with seven game-winning goals and was named to the ECAC Hockey All-Tournament Team. Jenner was again nominated for the Patty Kazmaier Award and named to the top ten finalists.

Following her junior season, Jenner took a year away from Cornell to compete at the 2014 Winter Olympics in Sochi, where she won a gold medal with Team Canada. She returned to Cornell for her senior season (2014–15), leading the ECAC in points with 51 (15 goals and 36 assists). She was named ECAC Forward of the Year as well as ECAC Player of the Year, Ivy League Player of the Year, and Patty Kazmaier Award top ten finalist — all for the second time.

Jenner concluded her Cornell career as the program's all-time leader in assists (136) and second all-time in points (229). She was a four-time Patty Kazmaier Award nominee, four-time First Team All-ECAC Hockey selection, and a four-time First Team All-Ivy League selection. Off the ice, she was a four-time Academic All-Ivy League selection and was named to the Quill and Dagger senior honor society. She was later nominated by the Ivy League for the NCAA Woman of the Year Award.

=== Calgary Inferno, 2015-19 ===
On June 6, 2015, Jenner announced her entry into the 2015 CWHL Draft with the intention of being selected by the Calgary Inferno, as she would also be studying for a master's degree in public policy at the University of Calgary and would be able to play alongside three or more Cornell Big Red graduates. Jenner captained the Inferno and helped the team capture their first Clarkson Cup championship in 2016. Contested at Ottawa's Canadian Tire Centre, she scored twice in an 8–3 victory over Les Canadiennes de Montréal. She helped the team win a second Clarkson Cup title in 2019. After the 2018–19 season, the CWHL abruptly ceased operations.

=== Professional Women's Hockey Players Association (PWHPA), 2019–2023 ===
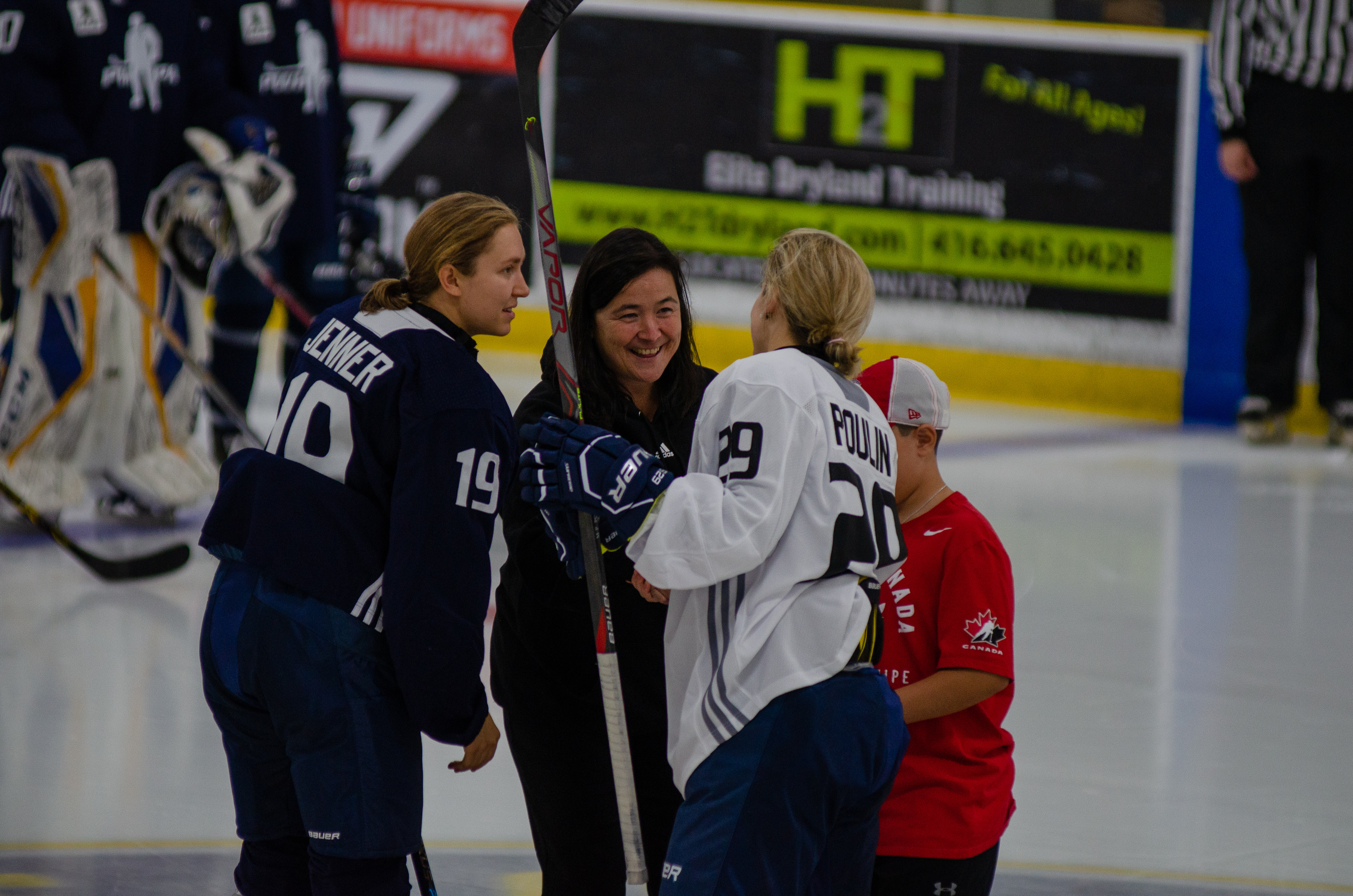
Jenner (left) with Marie-Philip Poulin during the Toronto Dream Gap Tour, 2019

After the collapse of the CWHL in 2019, Jenner helped launch the Professional Women's Hockey Players Association (PWHPA), which led a boycott of the remaining North American professional league, the National Women's Hockey League, in a bid to gather support for the establishment of a unified, financially sustainable professional league. Jenner skated for Team Sonnet (Toronto) in the 2021 Secret Cup, the Canadian leg of the 2020–21 PWHPA Dream Gap Tour. She recorded one goal in a 4-2 championship game loss versus Team Bauer (Montreal).

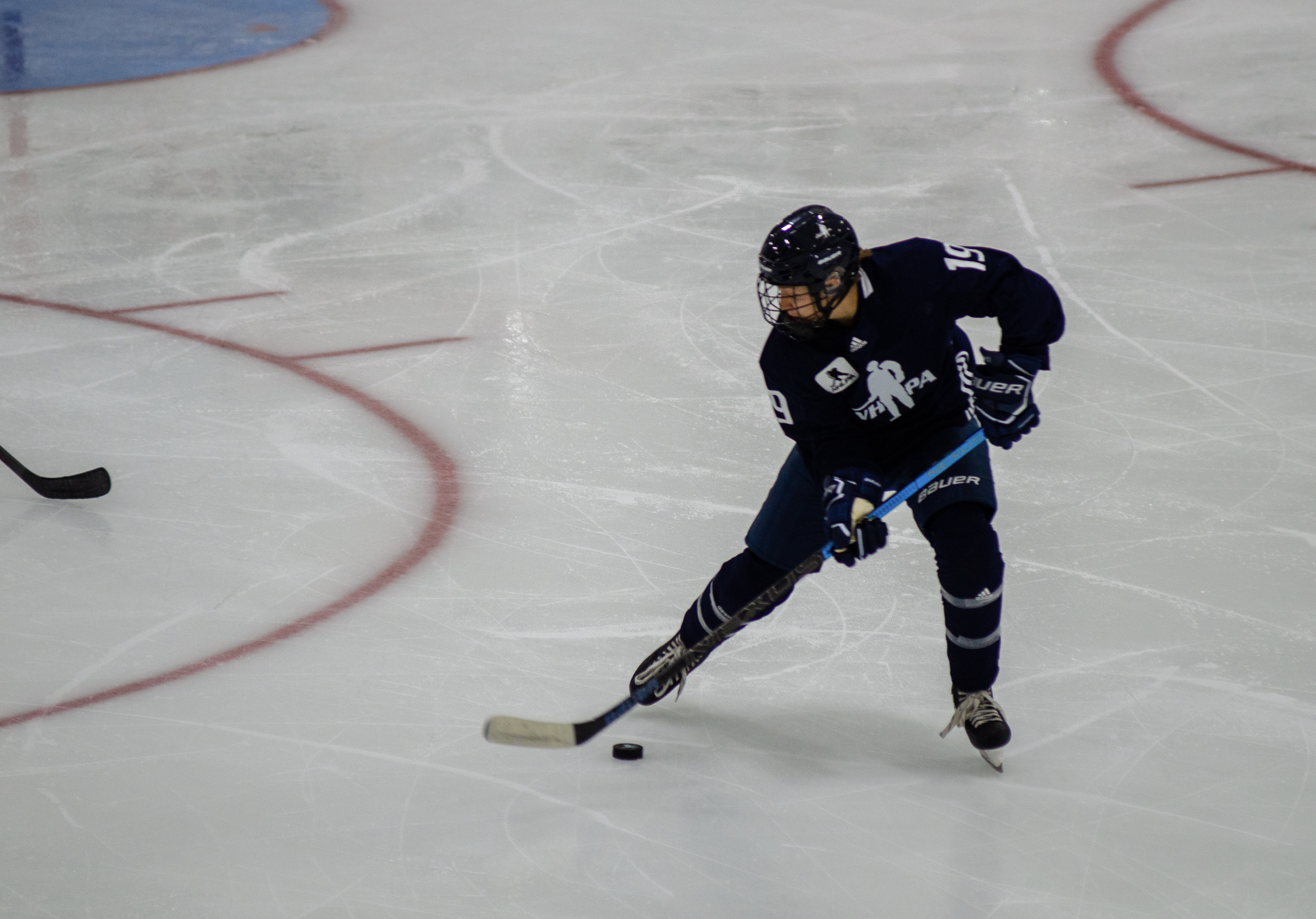
Jenner playing for PWHPA Dream Gap Tour in Toronto, 2019

In May 2022, the PWHPA signed a letter of intent with Billie Jean King Enterprises and the Mark Walter Group to explore a new professional league. She served on the PWHPA's bargaining committee alongside Kendall Coyne Schofield, Sarah Nurse, Hilary Knight, and Liz Knox, helping negotiate the collective bargaining agreement ratified in July 2023 that paved the way for the PWHL.

=== Ottawa Charge, 2023-2026 ===
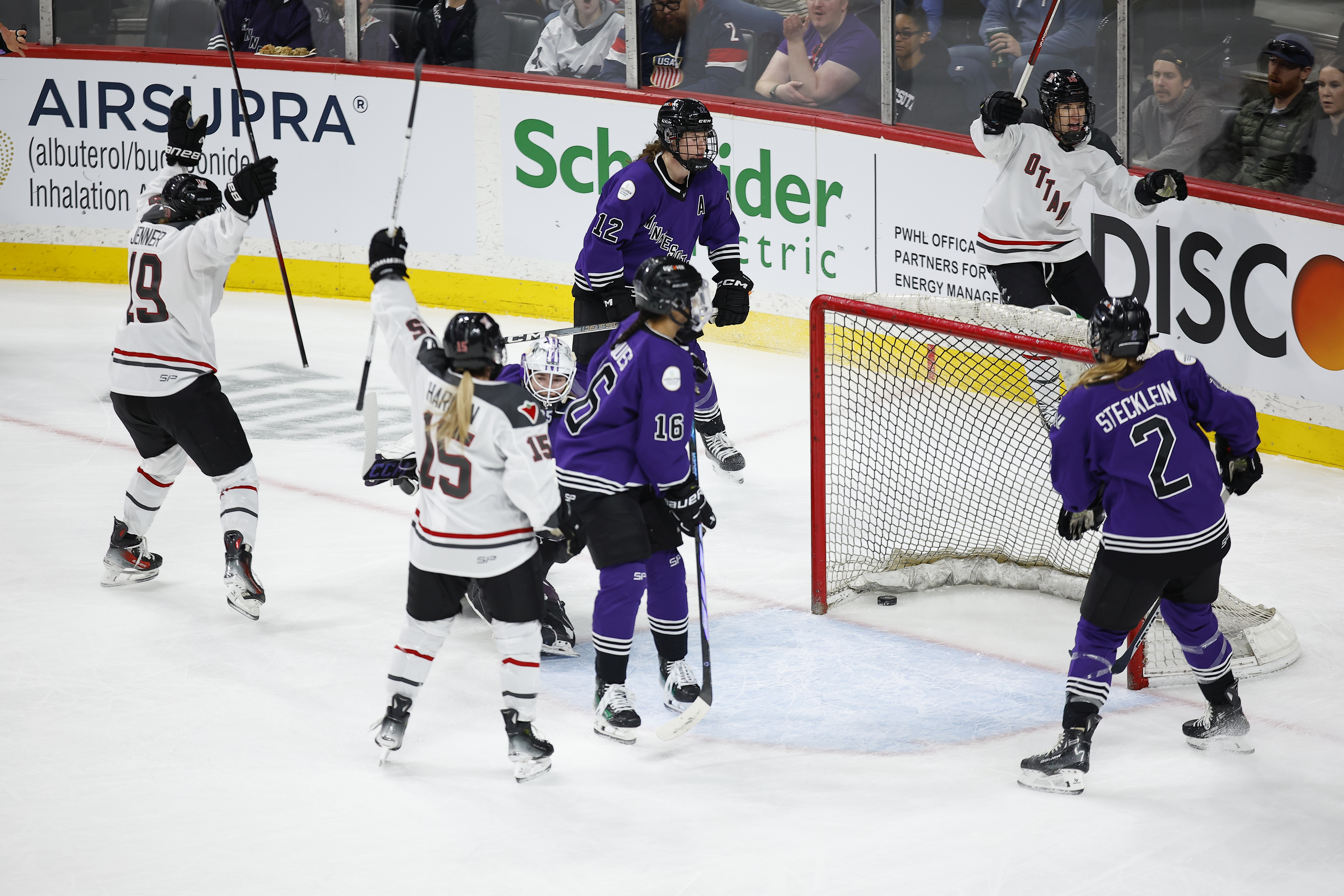
Jenner celebrates after Ottawa scored against the Minnesota Frost, March 2024

In 2023, Jenner was one of three initial free agent signings made by Ottawa in the Professional Women's Hockey League (PWHL). She and fellow Team Canada members Emily Clark and Emerance Maschmeyer were the first players announced by any team in the league. On December 29, 2023, Jenner was named Ottawa's captain. She scored her first PWHL goal on January 23, 2024, in a 3–1 win over Toronto. After a slow start to the season, Jenner found chemistry with linemates Daryl Watts and Kateřina Mrázová. She finished the inaugural PWHL season as Ottawa's leading scorer with 20 points (9 goals, 11 assists) in 24 games, ranking sixth overall in the league. She also led the team in power-play points (7) and power-play assists (5). Despite Jenner's production, Ottawa finished in fifth place and missed the playoffs. She was named to the PWHL Second All-Star Team for the 2023-24 season.

External videos
- Best of Brianne Jenner from PWHL Season Two, Ottawa Charge

In Ottawa's second PWHL season, the team rebranded as the Ottawa Charge in September 2024. Jenner recorded 15 points (7 goals, 8 assists) in 28 regular season games. The Charge clinched their first playoff berth on the final day of the regular season. Ottawa finished third in the standings with a 12-2-4-12 record. In the semifinals against the first-seeded Montreal Victoire, Jenner scored in Game 1 as Ottawa won 3-2. In Game 2, she scored late in regulation to force overtime in what became the longest game in PWHL history, a 3-2 Montreal victory in quadruple overtime. Ottawa won the series 3-1 to advance to their first Walter Cup Finals. In the Finals against the defending champion Minnesota Frost, Ottawa won Game 1 before losing the next three games, all decided in overtime. Jenner added 3 points (2 goals, 1 assist) in 8 playoff games as the Charge fell to Minnesota 3-1 in the series. Following the season, Jenner reflected on the team's playoff run, stating: "We went through a lot this season. We showed a lot of resiliency, and I think these last couple weeks, we did something really special."

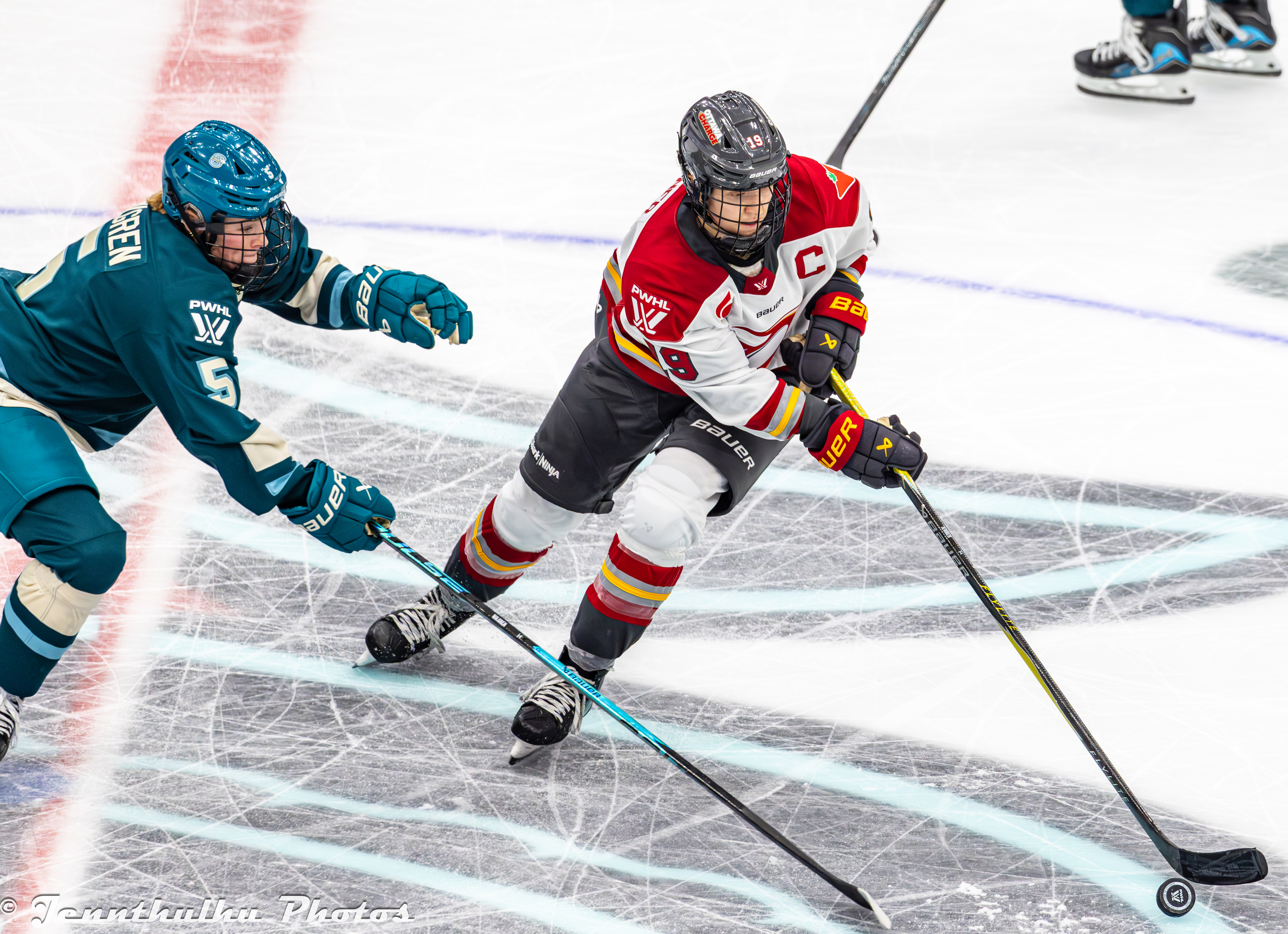
Captain Jenner during a game against the Seattle Torrent, December 2025

During the 2025-26 season, Jenner tied the PWHL single-game record with four points (2 goals, 2 assists) in a 5-1 victory over the Vancouver Goldeneyes on November 26, 2025. She became the sixth player in league history and the first member of the Charge to record a four-point performance. Jenner scored both a power-play goal and a shorthanded goal in the game, Ottawa's first victory of the season. For her performance, she was named PWHL First Star of the Week.

=== Hamilton Havoc, 2026–present ===
On June 5, 2026, as the first signing with a 2026 expansion team, Jenner signed a three-year standard player agreement with the Hamilton Havoc.

== International play ==
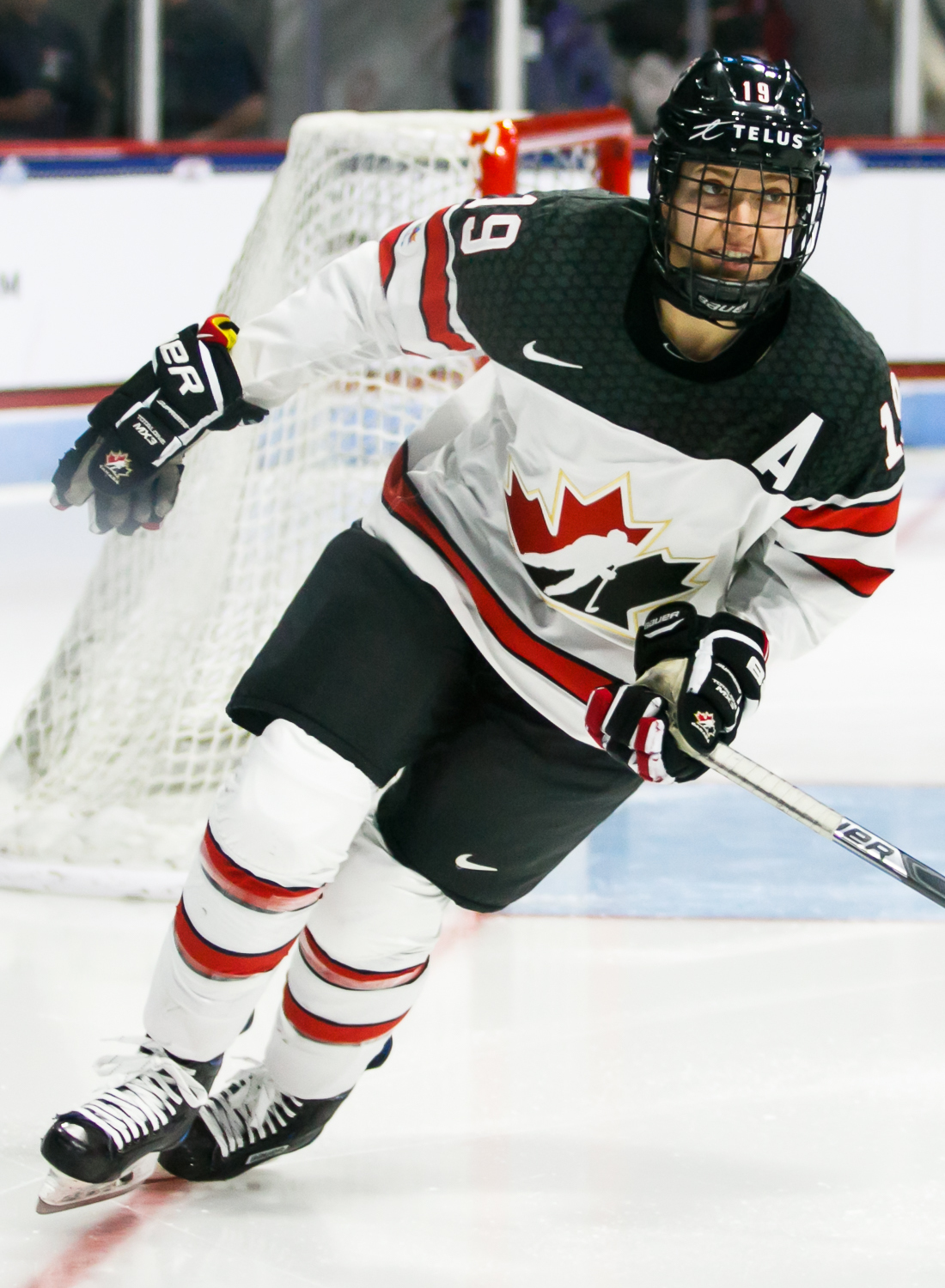
Jenner with Team Canada in 2017

=== Junior ===
In a January 9, 2008, contest versus Germany at the inaugural World Women's Under-18 hockey championship, Jenner scored twice and earned an assist in a 10–1 win. As an 18-year-old in 2009, she was centralized with the Canadian National Women's Team in preparation for the 2010 Winter Olympics in Vancouver, though she was among the final players released from the roster.

=== Senior ===
Jenner made her debut for the Canada national team at the 2010 Four Nations Cup and won a gold medal.

==== World Championships ====
As of 2025, Jenner has won 11 medals (four gold, six silver, one bronze) at the IIHF Women's World Championship. Jenner made her World Championship debut for the senior national team at the 2012 IIHF Women's World Championship, helping Canada win gold.

Jenner won silver medals at the 2013, 2015, 2016 and 2017 World Championships. She was named assistant captain of the national team for the first time in 2015. At the 2015 tournament, she recorded one goal and three points in five games and was named one of Canada's top-3 players. She added one goal and five points at the 2016 IIHF Women's World Championship and four points in five games at the 2017 IIHF World Championship.

At the 2019 IIHF Women's World Championship in Finland, Jenner had an outstanding performance with three goals and nine points in seven games and was named one of Canada's top-3 players, though Canada left the tournament with a bronze medal for the first time in history after losing 4-2 to host Finland in the semifinals.

At the 2021 IIHF Women's World Championship in Calgary, Canada won the world title for the first time in almost a decade. Jenner, one of just five players left from the gold medal-winning team in 2012, scored the opening goal in the final against the United States and assisted on Marie-Philip Poulin's overtime winner in Canada's 3-2 victory. She finished second in tournament scoring with 11 points and a +13 rating in six games.

At the 2022 IIHF Women's World Championship in Denmark, Jenner scored both goals in Canada's 2-1 gold medal victory over the United States, defending their world title for the first time since the early 2000s.

==== Olympics ====
Jenner was named to the 2014 Olympic roster for Canada. At the Sochi 2014 Winter Olympics, Jenner scored Canada's first goal in the gold medal game against the United States, a crucial goal with 3:26 remaining in the third period that cut the American lead to 2-1 and sparked Canada's comeback. Her shot ricocheted off the knee of an American defender and into the net. Canada went on to win 3-2 in overtime, with Marie-Philip Poulin scoring both the tying goal with 55 seconds left in regulation and the overtime winner, securing Canada's fourth consecutive Olympic gold medal.

At the 2018 PyeongChang Winter Olympics, Jenner served as an assistant captain and recorded two assists in five games as Canada won the silver medal after losing 3-2 to the United States in a shootout in the gold medal game. During the preliminary round, Jenner set up game-opening goals by Rebecca Johnston against Russia and Meghan Agosta against the United States. Jenner was selected to shoot in the fifth round of the gold medal game shootout but her shot was blocked.

On January 11, 2022, Jenner was named to Canada's 2022 Olympic team. At the Beijing 2022 Winter Olympics, Jenner was named tournament MVP after leading all players with nine goals, tying the Olympic record for most goals in a single women's tournament. She also added five assists for 14 points in seven games and was named to the Media All-Star team at forward as an assistant captain. Jenner scored her record-tying ninth goal in Canada's 10-3 semifinal victory over Switzerland. Canada defeated the United States 3-2 in the gold medal game to win their second Olympic gold medal, avenging their shootout loss from PyeongChang 2018.

On January 9, 2026, Jenner was named to Canada's roster to compete at the 2026 Winter Olympics in Italy. On February 10, 2026, Jenner served as Canada's captain, in place of an injured Marie-Philip Poulin, in a loss versus the United States. During the team's quarterfinal game against Germany, Jenner scored at 1:40 helping lead Canada to a 5-1 win and advance to the semifinals. She was part of the squad which won the silver medal following a 2-1 loss against the United States on February 19, 2026.

== Personal life ==
External videos
- Brianne Jenner and Hayleigh Cudmore find a balance of pro hockey and a young family, Hockey Canada

In July 2019, Jenner married her longtime partner Hayleigh Cudmore, a former teammate with Cornell and the Calgary Inferno. Jenner served on the board of directors for the Professional Women's Hockey Players Association (PWHPA) and, upon the formation of the PWHL in 2023, was named to the labour union's executive committee.

=== Endorsements ===
Jenner is a designated Nike athlete and participates in Nike community and outreach events. She is also sponsored by Bauer Hockey and has a signature pro stock stick model. Jenner joined the RBC Olympian program in 2017. She is represented by Creative Artists Agency (CAA).

== In popular culture ==
Jenner appeared on The Strip Live, a celebrity talk show, alongside Marie-Philip Poulin in 2018. Jenner is featured in The Inaugural Season of the PWHL, a documentary produced by Hello Sunshine and Reese Witherspoon as part of The Rise documentary series chronicling the growth of women's sports. The film, directed by Patty Ivins Specht follows the historic inaugural 2024 season of the PWHL and premiered on Peacock in February 2026.

== Career statistics ==
=== Regular season and playoffs ===
			Regular season					Playoffs
Season	Team	League	GP	G	A	Pts	PIM	GP	G	A	Pts	PIM
2005–06	Stoney Creek Jr. Sabres	Prov. WHL	26	21	11	32	14	5	6	1	7	0
2006–07	Stoney Creek Jr. Sabres	Prov. WHL	29	25	12	37	18	5	5	3	8	0
2007–08	Stoney Creek Jr. Sabres	Prov. WHL	26	29	16	45	12	7	6	2	8	10
2008–09	Mississauga Chiefs	CWHL	11	1	1	2	6	—	—	—	—	—
2009–10	Burlington Barracudas	CWHL	17	11	12	23	2	—	—	—	—	—
2010–11	Cornell University	ECAC	33	23	27	50	26	—	—	—	—	—
2011–12	Cornell University	ECAC	33	20	37	57	34	—	—	—	—	—
2012–13	Cornell University	ECAC	32	35	35	70	44	—	—	—	—	—
2014–15	Cornell University	ECAC	31	15	36	51	22	—	—	—	—	—
2015–16	Calgary Inferno	CWHL	24	10	18	18	6	3	2	4	6	2
2016–17	Calgary Inferno	CWHL	20	9	18	27	6	—	—	—	—	—
2017–18	Calgary Inferno	CWHL	4	1	1	2	4	3	0	2	2	0
2018–19	Calgary Inferno	CWHL	27	19	13	32	8	4	2	0	2	2
2019–20	GTA East	PWHPA	—	—	—	—	—	—	—	—	—	—
2020–21	Toronto	PWHPA	4	1	3	4	2	—	—	—	—	—
2022–23	Team Sonnet	PWHPA	20	5	14	19	2	—	—	—	—	—
2023–24	PWHL Ottawa	PWHL	24	9	11	20	4	—	—	—	—	—
2024–25	Ottawa Charge	PWHL	28	7	8	15	8	8	2	1	3	4
2025–26	Ottawa Charge	PWHL	30	12	14	26	8	8	0	1	1	8
CWHL totals			103	52	63	104	32	10	4	6	10	4
PWHL totals			82	28	33	61	20	16	2	2	4	12

=== International ===
Year	Team	Event	Result	GP	G	A	Pts	PIM
2008	Canada	U18	2nd place, silver medalist(s)	5	6	3	9	2
2009	Canada	U18	2nd place, silver medalist(s)	5	5	1	6	2
2012	Canada	WC	1st place, gold medalist(s)	5	0	1	1	0
2013	Canada	WC	2nd place, silver medalist(s)	5	4	2	6	2
2014	Canada	OG	1st place, gold medalist(s)	5	1	0	1	0
2015	Canada	WC	2nd place, silver medalist(s)	5	1	2	3	2
2016	Canada	WC	2nd place, silver medalist(s)	5	1	4	5	2
2017	Canada	WC	2nd place, silver medalist(s)	5	2	2	4	0
2018	Canada	OG	2nd place, silver medalist(s)	5	0	2	2	0
2019	Canada	WC	3rd place, bronze medalist(s)	7	3	6	9	4
2021	Canada	WC	1st place, gold medalist(s)	7	3	8	11	4
2022	Canada	OG	1st place, gold medalist(s)	7	9	5	14	2
2022	Canada	WC	1st place, gold medalist(s)	7	3	2	5	2
2023	Canada	WC	2nd place, silver medalist(s)	7	3	4	7	2
2024	Canada	WC	1st place, gold medalist(s)	7	1	2	3	0
2025	Canada	WC	2nd place, silver medalist(s)	7	0	2	2	0
2026	Canada	OG	2nd place, silver medalist(s)	7	1	2	3	0
Junior totals				10	11	4	15	4
Senior totals				91	32	44	76	20

== Awards and honours ==
=== NCAA ===
- Patty Kazmaier Award Nominee: 2011, 2012, 2013, 2015
- Patty Kazmaier Award Top-10 Finalist: 2013, 2015
- Ivy League Player of the Year: 2013, 2015
- Ivy League Rookie of the Year: 2011
- Cornell MVP: 2013
- First Team All-American: 2013
- Second Team All-American: 2015
- First Team All-ECAC Hockey: 2011, 2012, 2013, 2015
- First Team All-Ivy League: 2011, 2012, 2013, 2015
- ECAC women's ice hockey Player of the Week (Week of October 31, 2011)
- ECAC Player of the Week (Week of February 13, 2012)

=== CWHL ===
- Clarkson Cup champion: 2016, 2019

=== PWHL ===
- 2023–24 PWHL All-Second team
- 2025-26 PWHL All-First Team

=== Team Canada ===
- IIHF Women's World Hockey Championship gold medallist (2012, 2021, 2022, 2024), silver medallist (2013, 2015, 2016, 2017, 2023, 2025) and bronze medallist (2019)
- IIHF Women's World Championship Media All-Star Team – Forward (2022)
- Olympic gold medallist (2014, 2022) and silver medallist (2018)
- Olympic tournament MVP (2022)

Sporting positions
Preceded by Position created	Ottawa Charge captain 2023–present	Incumbent
