= 2011–12 Cornell Big Red women's ice hockey season =

ECAC Hockey Regular Season Champions
- Conference: 1 ECAC
- Home ice: Lynah Rink

Rankings
- USA Today/USA Hockey Magazine: 3
- USCHO.com/CBS College Sports: 3

Record
- Overall: 29-4-0
- Home: 17-2
- Road: 12-2

Coaches and captains
- Head coach: Doug Derragh
- Assistant coaches: Danielle Bilodeau; Edith Racine; Meredith Roth
- Captain(s): Rebecca Johnston, Catherine White, Chelsea Karpenko, Amanda Young

The Cornell Big Red women's hockey team represented Cornell University in the 2011–12 NCAA Division I women's ice hockey season. The Big Red are coached by Doug Derragh and aims to become the first team in ECAC to triumph in the NCAA Frozen Four championship game.

== Offseason ==
- August 5: Eight Big Red players were invited to the Canada Under-22 National Team Selection Camp from August 7–16. The players include: Amanda Mazzotta, Hayleigh Cudmore, Laura Fortino, Lauriane Rougeau, Jessica Campbell, Brianne Jenner, Chelsea Karpenko, Jillian Saulnier and Catherine White.
- October 17: Head coach Doug Derragh announced that senior players Rebecca Johnston, Catherine White, Chelsea Karpenko and Amanda Young were all named team captains for the season.

== Recruiting ==
Player	Position	Nationality	Notes
Emily Fulton	Forward	Canada	Team captain of the Bluewater Hawks of the PWHL
Monica Leck	Forward	Canada	Team captain of the Ottawa Jr. Senators in the 2010-2011 PWHL season
Katelyn Pippy	Goaltender	United States	She played the 2010-2011 season with the Pittsburgh Junior Penguins. Also an actress, Pippy appeared on the TV show Army Wives.
Jillian Saulnier	Forward	Canada	Team captain of the Toronto Aeros in the 2010-2011 PWHL season

== Exhibition ==
Date	Opponent	Location	Score	Big Red scorers
10/25/2011	Brampton Thunder (CWHL)	Ithaca, NY	6-0	Jillian Saulnier (2), Jessica Campbell, Olivia Cook, Kendice Ogilvie, Catherine White

== Regular season ==
- In her first three career NCAA games, Jillian Saulnier registered ten points (seven goals, three assists), along with a +6 rating. In her college debut versus the Colgate Raiders women's ice hockey program, Saulnier netted four goals. In her next game versus the Yale Bulldogs, she registered one goal and two assists, while scoring two goals in her third game versus the Brown Bears women's ice hockey squad. For the month of October 2011, she was tied for first in the ECAC in goals scored (while the other player appeared in eight games).
- October 25: In a 6-2 triumph over the Colgate Raiders, freshman Jillian Saulnier scored four goals in her NCAA debut. It was the first four-goal game for Cornell since Jessica Campbell scored four against Robert Morris in the second game of the 2010-11 season. The Big Red held a 64-12 advantage in shots on goal while also winning faceoffs by a margin of 53-27. The 64 shots were the most the Big Red took since a Feb. 6, 2000 contest against Union.
- October 29: In a 9-0 win versus ECAC opponent Brown, Big Red freshman Emily Fulton scored her first career NCAA goal. At game's end, Big Red skaters totalled 23 points, as Brianne Jenner and Hayleigh Cudmore led the way with three points each.
- November 1: For the third consecutive contest, the Big Red scored at least nine goals in one game. Senior captain Chelsea Karpenko appeared in her 100th career game, as Jillian Saulnier led all Big Red players with two goals and three assists in a 9-2 triumph over the Syracuse Orange women's ice hockey program.
- January 2012: The Big Red announced their NCAA commitments for autumn 2012. The players that have committed to join the Big Red include Jessica Brown (of the Pittsburgh Elite), Kelly Murray, Victoria Pittens, Cassandra Poudrier (from Dawson College), Morgan Richardson (older sister of the late Daron Richardson), and Anna Zorn.

=== Standings ===
2011–12 Eastern College Athletic Conference standings
	Conference							Overall					
	GP	W	L	T	PTS	GF	GA	GP	W	L	T	GF	GA
#3Cornell	16	14	2	0	28	75	23	22	19	3	0	107	39
#8Harvard	16	11	4	1	23	51	24	22	14	7	1	75	42
#10Dartmouth	16	10	4	2	22	39	26	22	14	6	2	66	47
Clarkson	16	10	4	2	22	51	23	28	16	7	5	82	51
Quinnipiac	16	10	4	2	22	42	30	27	15	10	2	65	59
St. Lawrence	16	9	5	2	20	47	35	27	15	8	4	85	63
Princeton	16	7	7	2	16	35	28	23	9	10	4	49	48
Brown	16	4	8	4	12	22	42	23	7	9	7	50	51
Rensselaer	16	5	9	2	12	34	44	28	8	16	4	63	83
Colgate	16	3	12	1	7	26	56	27	8	18	1	57	81
Union	16	2	12	2	6	20	47	28	4	20	4	48	89
Yale	16	1	15	0	2	14	78	23	1	22	0	22	118
Championship: To be determined † indicates conference regular season champion * indicates conference tournament champion National rankings: Conference rankings: Updated February 1st, 2012

=== Schedule ===
==== Regular season ====
Date	Opponent	Location	Time	Score	Record	Cornell scorers
10/25/2011	at Colgate University	Hamilton, NY	7:00 p.m.	6-2	1-0-0	Jillian Saulnier (4), Chelsea Karpenko
10/28/2011	Yale University	Lynah Rink	7:00 p.m.	9-0	2-0-0	Rebecca Johnston (2), Monika Leck, Brianne Jenner (2), Jillian Saulnier, Lauriane Rougeau, Catherine White (2)
10/29/2011	Brown University	Lynah Rink	3:00 p.m.	9-0	3-0-0	Chelsea Karpenko (2), Jillian Saulnier, Monika Leck, Emily Fulton, Lauriane Rougeau
11/1/2011	Syracuse University	Lynah Rink	7:00 p.m.	9-2	4-0-0	Brianne Jenner, Jillian Saulnier (2), Chelsea Karpenko (2), Rebecca Johnston, Monika Leck, Hayleigh Cudmore, Catherine White
11/11/2011	Dartmouth College	Lynah Rink	7:00 p.m.	4-5	4-1-0	Jessica Campbell, Alyssa Gagliardi, Chelsea Karpenko, Jillian Saulnier
11/12/2011	#10 Harvard University	Lynah Rink	4:00 p.m.	5-3	5-1-0	Jillian Saulnier (2), Chelsea Karpenko, Catherine White, Emily Fulton
11/18/2011	at Princeton University	Princeton, NJ	7:00 p.m.	3-1	6-1-0	Emily Fulton, Alyssa Gagliardi, Rebecca Johnston
11/19/2011	at Quinnipiac University	Hamden, CT	4:00 p.m.	7-1	7-1-0	Chelsea Karpenko (2), Rebecca Johnston, Brianne Jenner, Emily Fulton, Jessica Campbell, Catherine White
11/25/2011	#5 Boston University	Lynah Rink	7:00 p.m.	3-1	8-1-0	Emily Fulton, Rebecca Johnston (2)
11/26/2011	#5 Boston University	Lynah Rink	4:00 p.m.	7-1	9-1-0	Laura Fortino, Amanda Young, Jillian Saulnier (2), Hayleigh Cudmore, Catherine White, Brianne Jenner
12/2/2011	at #6 Mercyhurst College	Erie, PA	7:00 p.m.	5-4	10-1-0	Catherine White, Rebecca Johnston, Chelsea Karpenko (2), Laura Fortino
12/3/2011	at #6 Mercyhurst College	Erie, PA	2:00 p.m.	2-5	10-2-0	Chelsea Karpenko, Jessica Campbell
1/2/2012	^ vs St. Lawrence University	Akwesasne, N.Y.	4:00 p.m.	Cancelled		
1/6/2012	at Union College	Schenectady, NY	3:00 p.m.	9-1	11-2-0	Kendice Ogilvie, Monika Leck (2), Emily Fulton, Erin Barley-Maloney (2), Laura Fortino, Xandra Hompe (2)
1/7/2012	at Rensselaer Polytechnic Institute	Troy, NY	3:00 p.m.	3-0	12-2-0	Kendice Ogilvie, Laura Fortino, Brianne Jenner
1/10/2012	Colgate University	Lynah Rink	7:00 p.m.	3-0	13-2-0	Rebecca Johnston (2), Lauriane Rougeau
1/13/2012	Quinnipiac University	Lynah Rink	7:00 p.m.	4-1	14-2-0	Jillian Saulnier, Catherine White, Brianne Jenner, Jessica Campbell
1/14/2012	Princeton University	Lynah Rink	4:00 p.m.	1-0	15-2-0	Rebecca Johnston
1/17/2012	at Syracuse University	Syracuse, NY	7:00 p.m.	6-3	16-2-0	Rebecca Johnston (2), Brianne Jenner, Chelsea Karpenko, Erin Barley-Maloney, Catherine White
1/20/2012	at #9 Harvard University	Cambridge, MA	7:00 p.m.	2-0	17-2-0	Rebecca Johnston, Lauriane Rougeau
1/21/2012	at #10 Dartmouth College	Hanover, NH	4:00 p.m.	1-0 OT	18-2-0	Erin Barley-Maloney
1/27/2012	at St. Lawrence University	Canton, NY	7:00 p.m.	6-4	19-2-0	Jillian Saulnier, Rebecca Johnston (2), Lauriane Rougeau, Brianne Jenner, Alyssa Gagliardi
1/28/2012	at Clarkson University	Potsdam, NY	4:00 p.m.	3-5	19-3-0	Rebecca Johnston, Erin Barley-Maloney, Chelsea Karpenko
2/3/2012	Rensselaer Polytechnic Institute	Lynah Rink	7:00 p.m.	3-0	20-3-0	Brianne Jenner, Chelsea Karpenko, Alyssa Gagliardi
2/4/2012	Union College	Lynah Rink	4:00 p.m.	5-1	21-3-0	Emily Fulton, Brianne Jenner, Jillian Saulnier, Monika Leck (2)
2/7/2012	#5 Mercyhurst College	Lynah Rink	7:00 p.m.	5-1	22-3-0	Rebecca Johnston, Hayleigh Cudmore, Erin Barley-Maloney, Catherine White, Brianne Jenner
2/10/2012	at Brown University	Providence, RI	7:00 p.m.	5-0	23-3-0	Erin Barley-Maloney (2), Laura Fortino, Rebecca Johnston (2)
2/11/2012	at Yale University	New Haven, CT	4:00 p.m.	6-1	24-3-0	Rebecca Johnston (2), Brianne Jenner (2), Jillian Saulnier (2)
2/17/2012	Clarkson University	Lynah Rink	7:00 p.m.	2-1 OT	25-3-0	Rebecca Johnston, Jillian Saulnier
2/18/2012	#10 St. Lawrence University	Lynah Rink	4:00 p.m.	3-2	26-3-0	Brianne Jenner, Catherine White, Erin Barley-Maloney

=== ECAC Hockey Tournament ===
==== Quarterfinals ====
Date	Opponent	Location	Time	Score	Record	Cornell scorers
2/24/2012	Brown University	Lynah Rink	3:30 p.m.	4-2	27-3-0	Rebecca Johnston (2), Erin Barley-Maloney, Catherine White
2/11/2012	Brown University	Lynah Rink	2:00 p.m.	6-0	28-3-0	Chelsea Karpenko, Laura Fortino (2), Jillian Saulnier, Brianne Jenner, Erin Barley-Maloney

==== Semifinal ====
Date	Opponent	Location	Time	Score	Record	Cornell scorers
2/11/2012	Quinnipiac University	Lynah Rink	3:30 p.m.	5-1	29-3-0	Rebecca Johnston (2), Brianne Jenner, Jillian Saulnier, Alyssa Gagliardi

==== Final ====
Date	Opponent	Location	Time	Score	Record	Cornell scorers
2/11/2012	St. Lawrence University	Lynah Rink	4:00 p.m.	1-3	29-4-0	Chelsea Karpenko

== Awards and honors ==
- Emily Fulton, ECAC Rookie of the Week (Week of November 21, 2011)
- Brianne Jenner, ECAC Player of the Week (Week of October 31, 2011)
- Rebecca Johnston, Finalist, ECAC Player of the Year (2011–12)
- Amanda Mazzotta, ECAC Goaltender of the Week (Week of November 28, 2011)
- Amanda Mazzotta, ECAC Goaltender of the Week (Week of January 24, 2012)
- Jillian Saulnier, ECAC Rookie of the Week (Week of October 31, 2011)
- Jillian Saulnier, ECAC Rookie of the Week (Week of November 7, 2011)
- Jillian Saulnier, ECAC Rookie of the Month (Month of October 2011)
- Lauren Slebodnik, ECAC Defensive Player of the Week (Week of January 17, 2012)
- Rebecca Johnston, 2011-12 Ivy League Player of the Year
- Jillian Saulnier, 2011-12 Ivy League Rookie of the Year
- Rebecca Johnston, 2011-12 First Team All-Ivy
- Brianne Jenner, 2011-12 First Team All-Ivy
- Lauriane Rougeau, 2011-12 First Team All-Ivy
- Laura Fortino, 2011-12 First Team All-Ivy
- Amanda Mazzotta, 2011-12 Second Team All-Ivy
- Jillian Saulnier, 2011-12 Honorable Mention All-Ivy
- Catherine White, 2011-12 Honorable Mention All-Ivy
- Chelsea Karpenko, 2011-12 Honorable Mention All-Ivy
- Alyssa Gagliardi, 2011-12 Honorable Mention All-Ivy
- Rebecca Johnston, 2011-12 ECAC Hockey Player of the Year
- Jillian Saulnier, 2011-12 ECAC Hockey Rookie of the Year
- Chelsea Karpenko, 2011-12 ECAC Hockey Best Defensive Forward
- Lauriane Rougeau, 2011-12 ECAC Hockey Best Defensive Defenseman
- Rebecca Johnston, 2011-12 All-ECAC Hockey First Team
- Brianne Jenner, 2011-12 All-ECAC Hockey First Team
- Lauriane Rougeau, 2011-12 All-ECAC Hockey First Team
- Laura Fortino, 2011-12 All-ECAC Hockey First Team
- Jillian Saulnier, 2011-12 All-ECAC Hockey Second Team
- Jillian Saulnier, 2011-12 All-ECAC Hockey Rookie Team

=== Team awards ===
- Erin Barley-Maloney, Kate Hallada Pinhey '83 Most Improved Player Award
- Alyssa Gagliardi (co-recipient), TGHA Cub Club Mentor Award
- Alyssa Gagliardi (co-recipient), Wendell Earle Academic Awards
- Xandra Hompe (co-recipient), Wendell Earle Academic Awards
- Rebecca Johnston, Cornell women's hockey Bob Brunet '41 Most Valuable Player
- Chelsea Karpenko (co-recipient), William Fuert Jr. '39 Big Red Player of the Year Award
- Amanda Mazzotta (co-recipient), William Fuert Jr. '39 Big Red Player of the Year Award
- Amanda Mazzotta (co-recipient), Wendell Earle Academic Awards
- Kendice Ogilvie (co-recipient), Helanie Fisher Hebbie '84 Unsung Hero Award
- Jillian Saulnier, Class of '41 Rookie of the Year Award
- Catherine White (co-recipient), TGHA Cub Club Mentor Award
- Amanda Young (co-recipient), Helanie Fisher Hebbie '84 Unsung Hero Award

== CWHL Draft ==
- The following were selected in the 2012 CWHL Draft.

Round	Pick	Player	Team
1	2	Rebecca Johnston	Toronto Furies
4	17	Catherine White	Toronto Furies
