= 2011–12 Colgate Raiders women's ice hockey season =

- Conference: ECAC
- Home ice: Starr Rink

Rankings
- USA Today/USA Hockey Magazine: Not ranked
- USCHO.com/CBS College Sports: Not ranked

Record
- Neutral: 0-0-0

Coaches and captains
- Head coach: Scott Wiley
- Assistant coaches: Ryan Stone; Karine Senecal

The Colgate Raiders represented Colgate University in the 2011–12 NCAA Division I women's ice hockey season.

== Offseason ==
=== Recruiting ===
Player	Position	Nationality	Notes
Susan Allen	Goaltender	United States	
Brittney Brooks	Goaltender	United States	From Las Vegas, Nevada
Katie Case	Defense	United States	From Grosse Pointe Shores, Michigan
Taylor Craig	Forward	United States	Competed at the Tabor Academy
Casey Dockus	Forward	United States	From Saint Clair Shores, Michigan
Miriam Drubel	Forward	United States	Played at Hanover HS in New Hampshire
Lauren Fitzgerald	Forward	United States	Played at Noble and Greenough
Melissa Kueber	Forward	Canada	From St. Albert, Alberta

== Exhibition ==
Date	Opponent	Score	Goal scorers
Sept. 24	Toronto Jr. Aeros(PWHL)	4-8	Rachel Walsh, Jocelyn Simpson, Casey Dockus, Miriam Drubel
Sept. 30	Queen's Golden Gaels (CIS)	4-3	Katie Case, Taylor Volpe (2), Brittany Phillips

== Regular season ==
- October 7–8: In a pair of victories over the Lindenwood Lions, Brittany Phillips accumulated a total of 10 points. In the 7-2 victory on October 7, she notched two goals, while logging an assist. One of the goals was the game-winning goal.

The following day, she had seven points (two goals, five assists) in an 8-2 win. Of the four goals she scored, two were power play goals. Her seven points ranked second in program history for most points in one game. In addition, the five assists ranked second for most assists in one game.

In addition, Melissa Kueber registered six points in the sweep. On October 8, she led the team with four goals scored in an 8-2 triumph over the Lions. She also notched an assist. The four tallies tied for first in program history for most scores in one game.

=== Standings ===
2011–12 Eastern College Athletic Conference standings
	Conference							Overall					
	GP	W	L	T	PTS	GF	GA	GP	W	L	T	GF	GA
#3Cornell	16	14	2	0	28	75	23	22	19	3	0	107	39
#8Harvard	16	11	4	1	23	51	24	22	14	7	1	75	42
#10Dartmouth	16	10	4	2	22	39	26	22	14	6	2	66	47
Clarkson	16	10	4	2	22	51	23	28	16	7	5	82	51
Quinnipiac	16	10	4	2	22	42	30	27	15	10	2	65	59
St. Lawrence	16	9	5	2	20	47	35	27	15	8	4	85	63
Princeton	16	7	7	2	16	35	28	23	9	10	4	49	48
Brown	16	4	8	4	12	22	42	23	7	9	7	50	51
Rensselaer	16	5	9	2	12	34	44	28	8	16	4	63	83
Colgate	16	3	12	1	7	26	56	27	8	18	1	57	81
Union	16	2	12	2	6	20	47	28	4	20	4	48	89
Yale	16	1	15	0	2	14	78	23	1	22	0	22	118
Championship: To be determined † indicates conference regular season champion * indicates conference tournament champion National rankings: Conference rankings: Updated February 1st, 2012

=== Schedule ===
Date	Opponent	Score	Record
Oct. 7	New Hampshire	0-3	0-1-0
Oct. 8	Northeastern	0-5	0-2-0
10/14/2011	Lindenwood	7-2	1-2-0
10/15/2011	Lindenwood	8-2	2-2-0
10/19/2011	Syracuse		
10/25/2011	Cornell		
10/28/2011	Brown		
10/29/2011	Yale		
11/4/2011	Niagara		
11/5/2011	Niagara		
11/11/2011	Harvard		
11/12/2011	Dartmouth		
11/18/2011	Quinnipiac		
11/19/2011	Princeton		
11/22/2011	Robert Morris		
11/26/2011	Vermont		
11/27/2011	Vermont		
1/2/2012	Syracuse		
1/6/2012	Rensselaer		
1/7/2012	Union		
1/10/2012	Cornell		
1/13/2012	Princeton		
1/14/2012	Quinnipiac		
1/20/2012	Dartmouth		
1/21/2012	Harvard		
1/27/2012	Clarkson		
1/28/2012	St. Lawrence		
2/3/2012	Union		
2/4/2012	Rensselaer		
2/10/2012	Yale		
2/11/2012	Brown		
2/17/2012	St. Lawrence		
2/18/2012	Clarkson		

==== Conference record ====
CHA school	Record
Brown	0-0-0
Clarkson	0-0-0
Cornell	0-0-0
Dartmouth	0-0-0
Harvard	0-0-0
Quinnipiac	0-0-0
Princeton	0-0-0
RPI	0-0-0
St. Lawrence	0-0-0
Union	0-0-0
Yale	

== Awards and honors ==
- Melissa Kueber, ECAC Rookie of the Week (Week of October 17, 2011)
- Brittany Phillips, ECAC Player of the Week (Week of October 17, 2011)
- Kimberley Sass, ECAC Player of the Week (Week of February 6, 2012)
