= 2011–12 Clarkson Golden Knights women's ice hockey season =

- Conference: 3rd ECAC
- Home ice: Cheel Arena

Record
- Overall: 22–10–5
- Home: 12–3–4
- Road: 10–7–1

Coaches and captains
- Head coach: Shannon Desrosiers and Matt Desrosiers
- Assistant coaches: Matt Kelly
- Captain: Katelyn Ptolemy
- Alternate captain: Danielle Boudreau

The Clarkson Golden Knights women's ice hockey program represented Clarkson University during the 2011–12 NCAA women's ice hockey season. The Golden Knights secured their eighth consecutive appearance in the ECAC playoffs, but failed to qualify for their second NCAA tournament. The senior class consisted of Juana Baribeau, Katelyn Ptolemy, Gabrielle Kosziwka, Danielle Boudreau, Kali Gillanders and Brittany Mulligan.

== Recruiting ==
Player	Position	Nationality	Notes
Jenna Boss	Goaltender	United States	During 2010–11, participated for the Roseville Raiders in Minnesota where she acted as team captain 2010 Herb Brooks Award Finalist
Taylor Gedig	Defense	Canada	Attended the Warner School; Competed for Team BC in Ice hockey at the 2011 Canada Winter Games
Emily Horn	Goaltender	Canada	Competed for the Brampton Junior Thunder
Christine Lambert	Forward	Canada	Recruited by Cornell, Maine, Northeastern, St. Lawrence, UConn, Bemidji State and Princeton
Daniella Matteucci	Defense	Canada	Selected as the 2011 Female Athlete of the Year for the Notre Dame Hounds; Competed for Team BC in Ice hockey at the 2011 Canada Winter Games
Jennifer Shields	Defense	Canada	Competed for the Bluewater Jr. Hawks of the PWHL

== Schedule ==
Date	Opponent^{#}	Rank^{#}	Site	Decision	Result	Record
Regular Season
September 24	Whitby PWHL*		Cheel Arena • Potsdam, NY (exhibition)	Erica Howe	W 6–0	0–0–0
September 30	at Vermont*		Gutterson Fieldhouse • Burlington, VT	Erica Howe	T 3–3 ^{OT}	0–0–1
October 1	at St. Lawrence*		Appleton Arena • Canton, NY	Erica Howe	L 3–6	0–1–1
October 8	Providence*		Cheel Arena • Potsdam, NY	Erica Howe	W 3–0	1–1–1
October 9	Connecticut*		Cheel Arena • Potsdam, NY	Erica Howe	T 3–3 ^{OT}	1–1–2
October 14	at Syracuse*		Tennity Ice Skating Pavilion • Syracuse, NY	Erica Howe	W 3–2	2–1–2
October 15	Syracuse*		Cheel Arena • Potsdam, NY	Erica Howe	W 4–2	3–1–2
October 21	#4 Boston University*		Cheel Arena • Potsdam, NY	Erica Howe	T 2–2 ^{OT}	3–1–3
October 22	New Hampshire*		Cheel Arena • Potsdam, NY	Erica Howe	W 2–1	4–1–3
October 28	#10 Dartmouth		Cheel Arena • Potsdam, NY	Erica Howe	T 2–2 ^{OT}	4–1–4 (0–0–1)
October 29	Harvard		Cheel Arena • Potsdam, NY	Erica Howe	L 1–2 ^{OT}	4–2–4 (0–1–1)
November 4	at Union		Achilles Rink • Schenectady, NY	Erica Howe	L 1–2	4–3–4 (0–2–1)
November 5	at RPI		Houston Field House • Troy, NY	Erica Howe	W 2–1	5–3–4 (1–2–1)
November 11	Quinnipiac		Cheel Arena • Potsdam, NY	Erica Howe	W 3–0	6–3–4 (2–2–1)
November 12	Princeton		Cheel Arena • Potsdam, NY	Erica Howe	W 1–0	7–3–4 (3–2–1)
November 18	at #10 Harvard		Bright-Landry Hockey Center • Allston, MA	Erica Howe	L 1–2	7–4–4 (3–3–1)
November 19	at Dartmouth		Thompson Arena • Hanover, NH	Erica Howe	W 1–0	8–4–4 (4–3–1)
December 2	RPI		Cheel Arena • Potsdam, NY	Erica Howe	W 10–0	9–4–4 (5–3–1)
December 3	Union		Cheel Arena • Potsdam, NY	Erica Howe	W 6–2	10–4–4 (6–3–1)
December 10	at Niagara*		Dwyer Arena • Lewiston, NY	Erica Howe	W 3–1	11–4–4
December 11	at Niagara*		Dwyer Arena • Lewiston, NY	Erica Howe	W 1–0	12–4–4
January 5	at #7 Northeastern*		Matthews Arena • Boston, MA	Erica Howe	L 2–5	12–5–4
January 6	at #4 Boston College*		Conte Forum • Chestnut Hill, MA	Erica Howe	L 2–3	12–6–4
January 13	at Yale		Ingalls Rink • New Haven, CT	Erica Howe	W 5–2	13–6–4 (7–3–1)
January 14	at Brown		Meehan Auditorium • Providence, RI	Erica Howe	W 6–2	14–6–4 (8–3–1)
January 20	at St. Lawrence		Appleton Arena • Canton, NY	Erica Howe	L 2–3	14–7–4 (8–4–1)
January 21	St. Lawrence		Cheel Arena • Potsdam, NY	Erica Howe	T 1–1 ^{OT}	14–7–5 (8–4–2)
January 27	Colgate		Cheel Arena • Potsdam, NY	Erica Howe	W 4–1	15–7–5 (9–4–2)
January 28	#2 Cornell		Cheel Arena • Potsdam, NY	Erica Howe	W 5–3	16–7–5 (10–4–2)
February 3	Brown		Cheel Arena • Potsdam, NY	Erica Howe	W 4–3 ^{OT}	17–7–5 (11–4–2)
February 4	Yale		Cheel Arena • Potsdam, NY	Erica Howe	W 7–0	18–7–5 (12–4–2)
February 10	at Princeton		Hobey Baker Memorial Rink • Princeton, NJ	Erica Howe	W 2–1	19–7–5 (13–4–2)
February 11	at Quinnipiac		TD Bank Sports Center • Hamden, CT	Erica Howe	W 3–2	20–7–5 (14–4–2)
February 17	at #3 Cornell		Lynah Rink • Ithaca, NY	Erica Howe	L 1–2 ^{OT}	20–8–5 (14–5–2)
February 18	at Colgate		Starr Arena • Hamilton, NY	Erica Howe	W 1–0	21–8–5 (15–5–2)
ECAC Hockey Tournament
February 24	Quinnipiac*		Cheel Arena • Potsdam, NY (Quarterfinals Game 1)	Erica Howe	L 1–4	21–9–5
February 25	Quinnipiac*		Cheel Arena • Potsdam, NY (Quarterfinals Game 2)	Erica Howe	W 2–1	22–9–5
February 26	Quinnipiac*		Cheel Arena • Potsdam, NY (Quarterfinals Game 3)	Erica Howe	L 0–2	22–10–5
*Non-conference game. ^{#}Rankings from USCHO.com Poll.

== Awards and honors ==
- Juana Baribeau – ECAC Hockey Player of the Week (1/31), ECAC Hockey weekly Honor Roll (11/14)
- Danielle Boudreau – ECAC Hockey Best Defensive Defenseman finalist
- Erica Howe – ECAC Hockey Goaltender of the Year, ECAC Hockey First Team All-Star, ECAC Hockey Player of the Year finalist, ECAC Hockey Goaltender of the Month (October, November), ECAC Hockey Goaltender of the Week (10/18, 10/25, 11/14), ECAC Hockey weekly Honor Roll (10/11, 11/1, 11/22, 12/5, 12/12, 1/16, 1/31, 2/7, 2/13, 2/20)
- Gabrielle Kosziwka – ECAC Hockey weekly Honor Roll (10/18, 2/20)
- Christine Lambert – ECAC Hockey weekly Honor Roll (12/5, 1/16, 2/7)
- Carly Mercer – ECAC Hockey weekly Honor Roll (11/1, 1/16, 2/7)
- Jamie Lee Rattray – Patty Kazmaier Memorial Award nominee, ECAC Hockey Player of the Month (October), ECAC Hockey Player of the Week (12/5), ECAC Hockey weekly Honor Roll (10/4, 10/11, 10/25)
- Jennifer Shields – ECAC Hockey Rookie of the Month (December)
- Danielle Skirrow – ECAC Hockey weekly Honor Roll (12/12)
- Brittany Styner – ECAC Hockey weekly Honor Roll (2/13)
- Hailey Wood – ECAC Hockey weekly Honor Roll (11/14)
