= 2011–12 Quinnipiac Bobcats women's ice hockey season =

Nutmeg Classic champions
- Conference: 2 ECAC

Record
- Overall: 19–16–2

Coaches and captains
- Head coach: Rick Seeley
- Assistant coaches: Paul Nemetz-Carlson; Cassie Turner
- Captain: Jordan Elkins

The 2011–12 Quinnipiac Bobcats women's ice hockey season was the 11th season of play for the Quinnipiac Bobcats program. They represented Quinnipiac University during the 2011-12 NCAA Division I women's ice hockey season and played their home games at TD Bank Sports Center. The Bobcats competed in the Nutmeg Classic on November 25 and 26.

== Offseason ==
- August 3: Head coach Rick Seeley has announced that Cassie Turner has been promoted to associate head coach. Turner joined the coaching staff in 2008.
- August 17: Paul Nemetz-Carlson returns to Quinnipiac as an assistant coach. Previously, he served as an assistant coach during the team's inaugural 2001–02 season. From 2008 to 2011, he was the assistant coach at Yale.

=== Recruiting ===
Player	Nationality	Position	Notes
Anna Borgfeldt	Sweden	Forward	Competed for Linkoping
Morgan Fritz-Ward	United States	Forward	Played for Lakeville South
Nicole Kosta	Canada	Forward	Hometown is Mississauga, Ontario
Chelsea Laden	United States	Goaltender	Played at Lakeville South

== Exhibition ==
Date	Opponent	Time	Score	Goal scorers
09/24/11	Durham Jr. Lightning	7:00 PM	7–0	Breann Frykas, Amanda Colin, Brittany Lyons (2), Anna Borgfeldt, Kristen Eklund, Nicole Kosta

== Regular season ==
- October 1: In a match versus No. 8 nationally ranked Mercyhurst, Quinnipiac goaltender Victoria Vigilanti made 24 saves in a 1–0 shutout victory. It was the Bobcats first victory over Mercyhurst in twelve matches.
- The Bobcats will compete in the Nutmeg Classic on November 25 and 26.
- November 4: Captain Jordan Elkins registered her third goal in as many games in a 3–0 victory over ECAC opponent Yale. Goaltender Victoria Vigilanti netted her third shutout of the season. With the triumph, the Bobcats extend their undefeated record in ECAC conference play to 3–0–0.
- November 19: With a second period goal versus the Colgate Raiders, Kelly Babstock of the Quinnipiac Bobcats became the program's all-time leading scorer. In just her second season, Babstock surpassed Vicki Graham, who finished with 73 career points, after the 2006–07 season. Babstock reached the milestone in her 50th career game.
- November 25: In the first game of the Nutmeg Classic, Erica Uden Johansson scored the game-winning goal as the Bobcats defeated Connecticut by a 4–2 tally.
- November 26: Quinnipiac Bobcats player Kelly Babstock led all skaters in points at the 2011 Nutmeg Classic with four (one goal, three assists). With the two assists in the championship game, Babstock earned the 39 and 40 assists of her career, surpassing Caitlin Peters as the all-time assist leader in Bobcats history. Breann Frykas scored the game-winning goal as the Bobcats bested the Robert Morris Colonials by a 3–2 tally. The victory in the Nutmeg Classic was also the 200th career victory of head coach Rick Seeley.
- December 15: Head coach Rick Seeley has announced the five members of the Class of 2016. The recruits will join the Bobcats for the 2012–13 season. Defenders Cydney Roesler, Kristen Tamberg, and Lindsey West, will join forwards Nicole Brown and Nicole Connery. All five Bobcats signees played for Team Ontario Red and earned gold medals at the 2011 Canadian National Championships. In addition, Connery and Roesler have previously represented Canada at the Under-18 IIHF World Championships.

=== Standings ===
2011–12 Eastern College Athletic Conference standings
	Conference							Overall					
	GP	W	L	T	PTS	GF	GA	GP	W	L	T	GF	GA
#3Cornell	16	14	2	0	28	75	23	22	19	3	0	107	39
#8Harvard	16	11	4	1	23	51	24	22	14	7	1	75	42
#10Dartmouth	16	10	4	2	22	39	26	22	14	6	2	66	47
Clarkson	16	10	4	2	22	51	23	28	16	7	5	82	51
Quinnipiac	16	10	4	2	22	42	30	27	15	10	2	65	59
St. Lawrence	16	9	5	2	20	47	35	27	15	8	4	85	63
Princeton	16	7	7	2	16	35	28	23	9	10	4	49	48
Brown	16	4	8	4	12	22	42	23	7	9	7	50	51
Rensselaer	16	5	9	2	12	34	44	28	8	16	4	63	83
Colgate	16	3	12	1	7	26	56	27	8	18	1	57	81
Union	16	2	12	2	6	20	47	28	4	20	4	48	89
Yale	16	1	15	0	2	14	78	23	1	22	0	22	118
Championship: To be determined † indicates conference regular season champion * indicates conference tournament champion National rankings: Conference rankings: Updated February 1st, 2012

=== Schedule ===
Date	Opponent	Time	Result	Record	Conference Record
09/30/11	at Mercyhurst	7:00 PM	4–0	1–0–0	0-0-0
10/01/11	at Mercyhurst	2:00 PM	Win, 1–0	2–0–0	0-0-0
10/7/11	Maine	7:00 PM	3–4	2–1–0	0-0-0
10/8/11	Maine	1:00 PM	4–5, OT	2–2–0	0-0-0
10/15/11	at Northeastern	2:00 PM	1–3	2–3–0	0-0-0
10/21/11	at Boston College	7:00 PM	0–5	2–4–0	0-0-0
10/28/11	at Rensselaer *	3:00 PM	2–0	3–4–0	1–0–0
10/29/11	at Union *	3:00 PM	5–1	4–4–0	2–0–0
11/04/11	Yale *	7:00 PM	3–0	5–4–0	3–0–0
11/05/11	Brown *	4:00 PM	2–2		
11/11/11	at Clarkson *	7:00 PM	0–3		
11/12/11	at St. Lawrence *	4:00 PM	3–2		
11/18/11	Colgate *	7:00 PM	6–2		
11/19/11	Cornell *	4:00 PM	1–7		
11/22/11	Boston College *	7:00 PM	2–1 (OT)		
11/25/11	at Connecticut – Nutmeg Classic	4:00 PM	4–2		
11/26/11	vs. Robert Morris – Nutmeg Classic	7:00 PM			
12/02/11	at Brown *	4:00 PM			
12/03/11	at Yale *	4:00 PM			
12/09/11	at Princeton *	7:00 PM			
12/10/11	Princeton *	4:00 PM			
01/06/12	Dartmouth *	7:00 PM			
01/07/12	Harvard *	4:00 PM			
01/13/12	at Cornell *	7:00 PM			
01/14/12	at Colgate *	4:00 PM			
01/27/12	Syracuse	7:00 PM			
01/28/12	Syracuse	4:00 PM			
02/03/12	at Harvard *	7:00 PM			
02/04/12	at Dartmouth *	4:00 PM			
02/10/12	St. Lawrence *	7:00 PM			
02/11/12	Clarkson *	4:00 PM			
02/17/12	Union *	7:00 PM			
02/18/12	Rensselaer *	4:00 PM			

== Awards and honors ==
- Kelly Babstock, ECAC Player of the Week (Week of November 21, 2011)
- Kelly Babstock, Most Valuable Player, 2011 Nutmeg Classic
- Nicole Kosta, ECAC Rookie of the Week (Week of February 28, 2012)
- Chelsea Laden, ECAC Rookie of the Week (Week of November 28, 2011)
- Victoria Vigilanti, ECAC Goaltender of the Week (Week of December 12, 2011)
- Victoria Vigilanti, ECAC Goaltender of the Week (Week of February 28, 2012)

=== Team awards ===
- Kelly Babstock, Most Valuable Player for the second-consecutive season
- Rookie of the Year recipient Nicole Kosta
- Coaches’ Award recipient, senior Jordan Elkins
- Defensive Player of the Year recipient, junior Regan Boulton
