= 2011–12 Dartmouth Big Green women's ice hockey season =

- Conference: ECAC
- Home ice: Thompson Arena

Record

Coaches and captains
- Head coach: Mark Hudak

== Offseason ==
=== News and notes ===
- May 25, 2011: Dartmouth goaltender Lindsay Holdcroft competed at the Warren Strelow National Team Goaltending Camp in Ann Arbor, Michigan. Holdcroft was one of six ECAC goaltenders to compete in the camp.
- June 9, 2011: Holly Tyng has been promoted to associate head coach.
- June 20, 2011: Former Dartmouth player Correne Bredin was named as a mentor and ambassador to help promote women's hockey as part of the IIHF Ambassador and Mentor Program (AMP).
- August 19: Dartmouth head coach Mark Hudak was named an assistant coach for Team USA in the 2011 IIHF 12 Nations Tournament Series, Aug. 24-31, in Vierumäki, Finland.

== Recruiting ==
Player	Nationality	Position	Notes
Morgan Illikainen	United States	Defense	Competed for the Grand Rapids Greenway Lightning and the Minnesota Junior Whitecaps
Sam Zeiss	United States	Forward	Participated at Choate Rosemary Hall, and also played for the Connecticut Polar Bears U-19 team
Abbie Lund	United States	Forward	In 2010, she earned all-conference and all-state honors in Minnesota
Karlee Odland	Canada	Forward	Played for the Medicine Hat Hounds of the Alberta Major Midget Female Hockey League
Katie Milligan	Canada	Forward	She played with the Ottawa Lady Senators of the PWHL

== Regular season ==
- January 10: The Dartmouth Big Green and Providence Friars played each other in an outdoor game at Fenway Park in Boston. Providence skater Brooke Simpson scored her first career NCAA goal. With 1:14 remaining in regulation, Big Green forward Camille Dumais scored the game-winning goal on Providence netminder Genevieve Lacasse as the Big Green prevailed by a 3-2 mark.

=== Standings ===
2011–12 Eastern College Athletic Conference standings
	Conference							Overall					
	GP	W	L	T	PTS	GF	GA	GP	W	L	T	GF	GA
#3Cornell	16	14	2	0	28	75	23	22	19	3	0	107	39
#8Harvard	16	11	4	1	23	51	24	22	14	7	1	75	42
#10Dartmouth	16	10	4	2	22	39	26	22	14	6	2	66	47
Clarkson	16	10	4	2	22	51	23	28	16	7	5	82	51
Quinnipiac	16	10	4	2	22	42	30	27	15	10	2	65	59
St. Lawrence	16	9	5	2	20	47	35	27	15	8	4	85	63
Princeton	16	7	7	2	16	35	28	23	9	10	4	49	48
Brown	16	4	8	4	12	22	42	23	7	9	7	50	51
Rensselaer	16	5	9	2	12	34	44	28	8	16	4	63	83
Colgate	16	3	12	1	7	26	56	27	8	18	1	57	81
Union	16	2	12	2	6	20	47	28	4	20	4	48	89
Yale	16	1	15	0	2	14	78	23	1	22	0	22	118
Championship: To be determined † indicates conference regular season champion * indicates conference tournament champion National rankings: Conference rankings: Updated February 1st, 2012

=== Schedule ===
Date	Opponent	Location	Time	Score	Record	Big Green scorers
Fri, Oct 21	McGill (Exh.)	Hanover, N.H.	5:00 pm			
Sun, Oct 23	Boston College	at Chestnut Hill, Mass.	2:00 pm			
Fri, Oct 28	Clarkson *	at Potsdam, N.Y.	7:00 pm			
Sat, Oct 29	St. Lawrence *	at Canton, N.Y.	4:00 pm			
Sun, Nov 06	NEW HAMPSHIRE	Hanover, N.H.	2:00 pm			
Fri, Nov 11	Cornell *	at Ithaca, N.Y.	7:00 pm			
Sat, Nov 12	Colgate *	at Hamilton, N.Y.	4:00 pm			
Fri, Nov 18	ST. LAWRENCE *	Hanover, N.H.	7:00 pm			
Sat, Nov 19	CLARKSON *	Hanover, N.H.	4:00 pm			
Wed, Nov 23	Harvard *	at Cambridge, Mass.	7:00 pm			
Sat, Nov 26	NORTHEASTERN	Hanover, N.H.	7:00 pm			
Wed, Nov 30	HARVARD *	Hanover, N.H.	7:00 pm			
Sun, Dec 11	New Hampshire	at Durham, N.H.	2:00 pm			
Sat, Dec 31	Providence	at Providence, R.I.	2:00 pm			
Tue, Jan 03	VERMONT	Hanover, N.H.	7:00 pm			
Fri, Jan 06	Quinnipiac *	at Hamden, Conn.	7:00 pm			
Sat, Jan 07	Princeton *	at Princeton, N.J.	4:00 pm			
Fri, Jan 13	RENSSELAER *	Hanover, N.H.	7:00 pm			
Sat, Jan 14	UNION *	Hanover, N.H.	4:00 pm			
Fri, Jan 20	COLGATE *	Hanover, N.H.	7:00 pm			
Sat, Jan 21	CORNELL *	Hanover, N.H.	4:00 pm			
Fri, Jan 27	Brown *	at Providence, R.I.	7:00 pm			
Sat, Jan 28	Yale *	at New Haven, Conn.	4:00 pm			
Fri, Feb 03	PRINCETON *	Hanover, N.H.	7:00 pm			
Sat, Feb 04	QUINNIPIAC *	Hanover, N.H.	4:00 pm			
Fri, Feb 10	at Union *	at Schenectady, N.Y.	7:00 pm			
Sat, Feb 11	Rensselaer *	at Troy, N.Y.	4:00 pm			
Fri, Feb 17	YALE *	Hanover, N.H.	7:00 pm			
Sat, Feb 18	BROWN *	Hanover, N.H.	4:00 pm			

==== Conference record ====
CHA school	Record
Brown	
Clarkson	
Cornell	
Colgate	
Harvard	
Quinnipiac	
Princeton	
RPI	
St. Lawrence	
Union	
Yale	

== Awards and honors ==
- Camille Dumais, ECAC Player of the Week (Week of January 17, 2012)
- Kelly Foley, ECAC Player of the Week (Week of October 24, 2011)
- Lindsay Holdcroft, ECAC Player of the Week (Week of October 31, 2011)
- Sally Komarek, ECAC Player of the Week (Week of November 28, 2011)
- Ali Winkel, ECAC Player of the Week (Week of November 14, 2011)
