= 2011–12 Union Dutchwomen ice hockey season =

2011–12 Union Dutchwomen women's ice hockey season
- Conference: ECAC
- Home ice: Frank L. Messa Rink at Achilles Center

Rankings
- USA Today/USA Hockey Magazine: Not ranked
- USCHO.com/CBS College Sports: Not ranked

Record

Coaches and captains
- Head coach: Claudia Asano
- Assistant coaches: Ali Boe; Julie Chu

The 2011–12 Union Dutchwomen women's hockey team represented Union College in the 2011–12 NCAA Division I women's ice hockey season. The Dutchwomen were a member of the Eastern College Athletic Conference.

== Offseason ==
=== Recruiting ===
Player	Nationality	Position	Notes
Shenae Lundberg	United States	Goaltender	
Alex Tancrell-Fontaine	United States	Defense	
Kelly McGrath	United States	Defense	
Christine Valente	United States	Forward	
Camille Corbin	United States	Forward	
Bryanne Panchuk	Canada	Forward	Won a gold medal with Team Alberta at the 2011 Canada Winter Games

=== Exhibition ===
Date	Opponent	Location	Score
Sept. 24	University of Montreal (CIS)	Messa Rink	Cancelled

==== East West Showcase ====
Date	Opponent	Location	Score
Sept. 30	Minnesota	Minneapolis, MN	1-6
Oct. 1	St. Cloud State	Minneapolis, MN	1-4

== Regular season ==
- November 4, 2011: Emilie Arseneault scored a short handed goal late into the second period to give the Dutchwomen a 2-1 conference victory over the Clarkson Golden Knights women's ice hockey program. It was the Dutchwomen's first ECAC win since the 2009–2010 season, and only their second ECAC win since 2004.

=== Standings ===
2011–12 Eastern College Athletic Conference standings
	Conference							Overall					
	GP	W	L	T	PTS	GF	GA	GP	W	L	T	GF	GA
#3Cornell	16	14	2	0	28	75	23	22	19	3	0	107	39
#8Harvard	16	11	4	1	23	51	24	22	14	7	1	75	42
#10Dartmouth	16	10	4	2	22	39	26	22	14	6	2	66	47
Clarkson	16	10	4	2	22	51	23	28	16	7	5	82	51
Quinnipiac	16	10	4	2	22	42	30	27	15	10	2	65	59
St. Lawrence	16	9	5	2	20	47	35	27	15	8	4	85	63
Princeton	16	7	7	2	16	35	28	23	9	10	4	49	48
Brown	16	4	8	4	12	22	42	23	7	9	7	50	51
Rensselaer	16	5	9	2	12	34	44	28	8	16	4	63	83
Colgate	16	3	12	1	7	26	56	27	8	18	1	57	81
Union	16	2	12	2	6	20	47	28	4	20	4	48	89
Yale	16	1	15	0	2	14	78	23	1	22	0	22	118
Championship: To be determined † indicates conference regular season champion * indicates conference tournament champion National rankings: Conference rankings: Updated February 1st, 2012

=== Schedule ===
Date	Opponent	Location	Score	Goal scorers	Record	Conf record
Oct. 8	Sacred Heart	Messa Rink	9-2	Stefanie Thomson (2), Lauren Hoffman, Mac Purvis, Rhianna Kurio, Christine Valente, Emilie Arsenault, Bryanne Panchuk, Molly Kate Durvin	1-0-0	0-0-0
Oct. 14	Northeastern	Boston	1-2	Stefanie Thomson	1-1-0	0-0-0
Oct. 15	Boston University	Boston	2-6	Rhianna Kurio, Christine Valente	1-2-0	0-0-0
Oct. 21	Syracuse	Syracuse				
Oct. 22	Syracuse	Syracuse				
Oct. 28	Princeton	Messa Rink				
Oct. 29	Quinnipiac	Messa Rink				

==== Conference record ====
CHA school	Record
Brown	0-0-0
Clarkson	0-0-0
Colgate	0-0-0
Cornell	0-0-0
Dartmouth	0-0-0
Harvard	0-0-0
Quinnipiac	0-0-0
Princeton	0-0-0
RPI	0-0-0
St. Lawrence	0-0-0
Yale	

== Awards and honors ==
- Kate Gallagher, ECAC Goaltender of the Week (Week of November 7, 2011)
- Stefanie Thomson, ECAC Player of the Week (Week of October 10, 2011)
- Christiner Valente, ECAC Rookie of the Week (Week of October 24, 2011)

=== Team awards ===
- Kate Gallagher, George Morrison Most Valuable Player Award for the second consecutive year.
- Dania Simmonds received the Ashley Kilstein Award for community service
- Dania Simmonds, Coaches' Award.
- Stefanie Thomson and freshman Alex Tancrell-Fontaine, Most Improved Player Award (tie)
- Christine Valente was named Rookie of the Year

== See also ==
- 2009–10 Union Dutchwomen women's ice hockey season
- 2010–11 Union Dutchwomen women's ice hockey season
