= 2011–12 Princeton Tigers women's ice hockey season =

- Conference: ECAC
- Home ice: Hobey Baker Rink

Rankings
- USA Today/USA Hockey Magazine: Not ranked
- USCHO.com/CBS College Sports: Not ranked

Record

Coaches and captains
- Head coach: Jeff Kampersal
- Assistant coaches: Lee-J Mirasolo

The 2011–12 Princeton Tigers women's hockey team represented Princeton University in the 2011–12 NCAA Division I women's ice hockey season. The Tigers were a member of the Eastern College Athletic Conference.

== Offseason ==
- September 22: Lee-J Mirasolo has joined the Tigers coaching staff as an assistant coach.

=== Recruiting ===
Player	Nationality	Position	Notes
Ashley Holt	United States	Goaltender	Played at Choate Rosemary Hall
Brianna Leahy	Canada	Forward	Competed with Burlington of the PWHL
Brianne Mahoney	United States	Defense	Participated with the Chicago Mission
Ali Pankowski	United States	Defense	Studied at the North American Hockey Academy

== Regular season ==
=== Standings ===
2011–12 Eastern College Athletic Conference standings
	Conference							Overall					
	GP	W	L	T	PTS	GF	GA	GP	W	L	T	GF	GA
#3Cornell	16	14	2	0	28	75	23	22	19	3	0	107	39
#8Harvard	16	11	4	1	23	51	24	22	14	7	1	75	42
#10Dartmouth	16	10	4	2	22	39	26	22	14	6	2	66	47
Clarkson	16	10	4	2	22	51	23	28	16	7	5	82	51
Quinnipiac	16	10	4	2	22	42	30	27	15	10	2	65	59
St. Lawrence	16	9	5	2	20	47	35	27	15	8	4	85	63
Princeton	16	7	7	2	16	35	28	23	9	10	4	49	48
Brown	16	4	8	4	12	22	42	23	7	9	7	50	51
Rensselaer	16	5	9	2	12	34	44	28	8	16	4	63	83
Colgate	16	3	12	1	7	26	56	27	8	18	1	57	81
Union	16	2	12	2	6	20	47	28	4	20	4	48	89
Yale	16	1	15	0	2	14	78	23	1	22	0	22	118
Championship: To be determined † indicates conference regular season champion * indicates conference tournament champion National rankings: Conference rankings: Updated February 1st, 2012

=== Schedule ===
Date	Opponent	Location	Score	Record	Conf record
Oct. 21	Northeastern	Hober Baker Rink			
Oct. 22	Niagara	Hober Baker Rink			
Oct. 28	Union	Messa Rink			
Oct. 29	RPI	Troy, NY			
Nov. 4	Brown	Hober Baker Rink	1–0		
Nov. 5	Yale	Hober Baker Rink	7–1		

== Awards and honors ==
- Denna Laing, ECAC Player of the Week (Week of November 7, 2011)
