= 2011–12 Harvard Crimson women's ice hockey season =

- Conference: ECAC
- Home ice: Bright Hockey Center

Rankings
- USA Today/USA Hockey Magazine: Not ranked
- USCHO.com/CBS College Sports: Not ranked

Record

Coaches and captains
- Head coach: Katey Stone

== Offseason ==
- Sept. 15: In the ECAC preseason coaches poll, Harvard was picked to finish second. Harvard is one of only two teams to earn more than 100 points in the pol. Two-time defending league champion Cornell took first, gathering 121 total points and 11 first-place votes.
- Oct. 6: Former Crimson player Angela Ruggiero will be inducted into the National Italian Sports Hall of Fame. Ruggiero's induction will occur on October 22 in Chicago.

=== Recruiting ===
Player	Nationality	Position	Height	Shoots	Hometown	Former team
Hillary Crowe	United States	Forward	5-11	R	Eden Prairie, Minn.	The Blake School
Sarah Edney	Canada	Defense	5-6	L	Mississauga, Ont.	Our Lady of Mount Carmel SS
Michelle Picard	United States	Defense	5-6	L	Taunton, Mass.	Noble & Greenough School
Tiana Press	United States	Goalie	5-6	R	Minnetonka, Minn.	St. Margaret's
Samantha Reber	United States	Forward	5-9	L	Edina, Minn.	Edina

== Exhibition ==
Date	Opponent	Time	Score	Record
Oct 22, 2011	McGill	4:00 p.m.		

== Regular season ==
- November 12: Hillary Crowe recorded her first career goal and assist in the same contest versus the Cornell Big Red. The first assist of her NCAA career came on the first NCAA goal for Sarah Edney.
- January 13 to 14: Hillary Crowe registered four points in two ECAC conference wins versus RPI and Union. Of note, she assisted on the game-winning goals in both contests. In the win versus RPI, Crowe contributed with three assists in a come from behind win.
- February 3: Jillian Dempsey helped the Crimson come back from a 2-0 deficit versus Quinnipiac. In a 4-2 final tally, she registered her ninth multi-point game of the year.
- February 4: Dempsey was one goal short of tying the NCAA record for goals in a game, netting five against Princeton. With Harvard behind 1-0 in the second period, she netted three straight markers for a natural hat trick. Late in the second, she added her fourth of the frame. Dempsey recorded a power-play and a short-handed goal also. Her fifth goal came with 41 seconds remaining in the contest.
- February 7: The Crimson faced a three-goal third-period deficit, and lost the Women's Beanpot consolation game to Boston College at Walter Brown Arena. The 4-2 loss marks the first time since 1993 that the Crimson finished fourth at the annual Beanpot.

=== Standings ===
2011–12 Eastern College Athletic Conference standings
	Conference							Overall					
	GP	W	L	T	PTS	GF	GA	GP	W	L	T	GF	GA
#3Cornell	16	14	2	0	28	75	23	22	19	3	0	107	39
#8Harvard	16	11	4	1	23	51	24	22	14	7	1	75	42
#10Dartmouth	16	10	4	2	22	39	26	22	14	6	2	66	47
Clarkson	16	10	4	2	22	51	23	28	16	7	5	82	51
Quinnipiac	16	10	4	2	22	42	30	27	15	10	2	65	59
St. Lawrence	16	9	5	2	20	47	35	27	15	8	4	85	63
Princeton	16	7	7	2	16	35	28	23	9	10	4	49	48
Brown	16	4	8	4	12	22	42	23	7	9	7	50	51
Rensselaer	16	5	9	2	12	34	44	28	8	16	4	63	83
Colgate	16	3	12	1	7	26	56	27	8	18	1	57	81
Union	16	2	12	2	6	20	47	28	4	20	4	48	89
Yale	16	1	15	0	2	14	78	23	1	22	0	22	118
Championship: To be determined † indicates conference regular season champion * indicates conference tournament champion National rankings: Conference rankings: Updated February 1st, 2012

=== Schedule ===
Date	Opponent	Time	Score	Record
Oct 28, 2011	at St. Lawrence	7:00 p.m.		
Oct 29, 2011	at Clarkson	4:00 p.m.		
Nov 11, 2011	at Colgate	7:00 p.m.		
Nov 12, 2011	at Cornell	4:00 p.m.		
Nov 18, 2011	Clarkson	7:00 p.m.		
Nov 19, 2011	St. Lawrence	4:00 p.m.		
Nov 23, 2011	Dartmouth	7:00 p.m.		
Nov 26, 2011	Minnesota	4:00 p.m.		
Nov 27, 2011	Minnesota	1:00 p.m.		
Nov 30, 2011	at Dartmouth	7:00 p.m.		
Dec 9, 2011	New Hampshire	7:00 p.m.		
Dec 10, 2011	at Providence	1:00 p.m.		
Jan 3, 2012	at Connecticut	7:00 p.m.		
Jan 6, 2012	at Princeton	7:00 p.m.		
Jan 7, 2012	at Quinnipiac	4:00 p.m.		
Jan 13, 2012	Union	7:00 p.m.		
Jan 14, 2012	Rensselaer	4:00 p.m.		
Jan 20, 2012	Cornell	7:00 p.m.		
Jan 21, 2012	Colgate	4:00 p.m.		
Jan 27, 2012	at Yale	7:00 p.m.		
Jan 28, 2012	at Brown	4:00 p.m.		
Jan 31, 2012	at Boston University Beanpot first round	7:00 p.m.	2-5	
Feb 3, 2012	Quinnipiac	7:00 p.m.	4-2	
Feb 4, 2012	Princeton	4:00 p.m.	10-1	
Feb 10, 2012	at Rensselaer	7:00 p.m.		
Feb 11, 2012	at Union	4:00 p.m.		
Feb 17, 2012	Brown	7:00 p.m.		
Feb 18, 2012	Yale	4:00 p.m.		

==== Conference record ====
CHA school	Record
Brown	
Clarkson	
Cornell	
Colgate	
Dartmouth	
Quinnipiac	
Princeton	
RPI	
St. Lawrence	
Union	
Yale	

== Awards and honors ==
- Laura Bellamy, ECAC Defensive Player of the Week (Week of November 21, 2011)
- Hillary Crowe, ECAC Rookie of the Week (Week of January 17, 2012)
- Jillian Dempsey, ECAC Player of the Week (Week of December 12, 2011)
- Jillian Dempsey, ECAC Player of the Week (Week of February 6, 2012)
- Jillian Dempsey, Harvard Athlete of the Week (Week of February 6, 2012)
- Jillian Dempsey, ECAC Player of the Week (Week of February 28, 2012)
- Jillian Dempsey, Finalist, ECAC Player of the Year (2011–12)
- Samantha Reber, ECAC Rookie of the Week (Week of December 12, 2011)
- Samantha Reber, ECAC Player of the Week (Week of February 6, 2012)
