= 2011–12 St. Lawrence Skating Saints women's ice hockey season =

2011–12 St. Lawrence Saints women's ice hockey season

ECAC tournament Champions NCAA Regionals, L, 6-3 vs. Boston College
- Conference: Not ranked ECAC
- Home ice: Appleton Arena

Rankings
- USA Today/USA Hockey Magazine: Not ranked

Record

Coaches and captains
- Head coach: Chris Wells

The 2011–12 St. Lawrence Saints women's hockey team represented St. Lawrence University in the 2011–12 NCAA Division I women's ice hockey season. The Saints were coached by Chris Wells and played their home games at Appleton Arena. The Saints were a member of the Eastern College Athletic Conference.

== Recruiting ==
Player	Position	Nationality	Notes
Amanda Boulier	Defense	United States	Played for the Connecticut Polar Bears
Jessica Hon	Forward	United States	Graduate of the North American Hockey Academy
Margo Lund	Forward	United States	Hails from Minnesota
Jessa MacAuliffe	Defense	Canada	Played for the Whitby Jr. Wolves
Carmen MacDonald	Goaltender	Canada	A card of her was featured in the Upper Deck 2010 World of Sports card series.
Jacqueline Wand	Forward	United States	Participated with the Chicago Mission
Carrie Wilder	Forward	United States	Hails from Ithaca, New York
Ellie Williams	Forward	United States	Competed at Shattuck St. Mary's

== Exhibition ==
Date	Opponent	Location	Score	Saints scorers
10/25/2011	McGill Martlets women's ice hockey	Appleton Arena	2-1	Rylee Smith

== Regular season ==
=== Standings ===
2011–12 Eastern College Athletic Conference standings
	Conference							Overall					
	GP	W	L	T	PTS	GF	GA	GP	W	L	T	GF	GA
#3Cornell	16	14	2	0	28	75	23	22	19	3	0	107	39
#8Harvard	16	11	4	1	23	51	24	22	14	7	1	75	42
#10Dartmouth	16	10	4	2	22	39	26	22	14	6	2	66	47
Clarkson	16	10	4	2	22	51	23	28	16	7	5	82	51
Quinnipiac	16	10	4	2	22	42	30	27	15	10	2	65	59
St. Lawrence	16	9	5	2	20	47	35	27	15	8	4	85	63
Princeton	16	7	7	2	16	35	28	23	9	10	4	49	48
Brown	16	4	8	4	12	22	42	23	7	9	7	50	51
Rensselaer	16	5	9	2	12	34	44	28	8	16	4	63	83
Colgate	16	3	12	1	7	26	56	27	8	18	1	57	81
Union	16	2	12	2	6	20	47	28	4	20	4	48	89
Yale	16	1	15	0	2	14	78	23	1	22	0	22	118
Championship: To be determined † indicates conference regular season champion * indicates conference tournament champion National rankings: Conference rankings: Updated February 1st, 2012

=== Schedule ===
Date	Opponent	Location	Score	Record	Saints scorers
10/01/2011	Clarkson	Appleton Arena	6-3	1-0-0	
10/08/2011	Connecticut	Appleton Arena	4-1	2-0-0	
10/09/2011	Providence	Appleton Arena	3-3	2-0-1	
10/18/2011	Niagara	Niagara	6-3	3-0-1	
10/21/2011	New Hampshire	Appleton Arena	2-2	3-0-2	
10/22/2011	Boston University	Appleton Arena	2-3	3-1-2	
10/28/2011	Harvard	Appleton Arena	1-7	3-2-2	
10/29/2011	Dartmouth	Appleton Arena	0-1	3-3-2	
11/04/2011	RPI	Troy, NY	2-1	4-3-2	
11/05/2011	Union	Schenectady, NY	2-2	4-3-3	
11/11/2011	Princeton	Appleton Arena	4-1	5-3-3	
11/12/2011	Quinnipiac	Appleton Arena	2-3	5-4-3	
11/18/2011	Dartmouth	Hanover, NH	2-0	6-4-3	
11/19/2011	Harvard	Cambridge, MA	1-6	6-5-3	
11/22/2011	Mercyhurst	Erie, PA	3-5	6-6-3	
11/23/2011	Mercyhurst	Erie, PA	4-1	6-7-3	
12/02/2011	Union	Appleton Arena	3-1	7-7-3	
12/03/2011	RPI	Appleton Arena	6-3	8-7-3	
1/2/2012	vs Cornell	Akwesasne, N.Y.	Cancelled		
2/18/2012	Cornell Big Red	Lynah Rink			

==== Conference record ====
CHA school	Record
Brown	1-0-0
Clarkson	1-0-1
Colgate	
Cornell	
Dartmouth	1-1-0
Harvard	0-2-0
Quinnipiac	0-1-0
Princeton	1-0-0
RPI	2-0-0
Union	1-0-1
Yale	1-0-0

== Postseason ==
=== NCAA tournament ===
- March 10, 3-6 vs. Boston College

== Awards and honors ==
- Carmen MacDonald, ECAC Rookie of the Week (Week of January 24, 2012)
- Rylee Smith, ECAC Player of the Week (Week of January 24, 2012)
