= 2011–12 Brown Bears women's ice hockey season =

- Conference: ECAC
- Home ice: Meehan Auditorium

Rankings
- USA Today/USA Hockey Magazine: Not ranked
- USCHO.com/CBS College Sports: Not ranked

Record

Coaches and captains
- Head coach: Amy Bourbeau
- Captain(s): Paige Pyett, Katelyn Landry

The Brown Bears represent Brown University in ECAC women's ice hockey.

== Offseason ==
- August 16, 2011: Former Princeton Tigers assistant coach Amy Bourbeau has been named the new head coach of the Brown Bears. She is the third head coach in Brown's 47-year women's hockey history. She was honored by the American Hockey Coaches Association (AHCA) with its inaugural Women's Ice Hockey Assistant Coach Award.
- September 28: Bears head coach Amy Bourbeau has appointed seniors Paige Pyett and Katelyn Landry as team captains for the upcoming year.

=== Recruiting ===
Player	Position	Nationality	Former team	Notes
Shannon Flatley	F/D	Canada	Havergal College	Niece of former New York Islanders player Patrick Flatley
Kaitlyn Keon	F/D	Canada	Birchmount Park Collegiate Institute	Granddaughter of Stanley Cup champion Dave Keon
Brittany Moorehead	F	United States	Clinton	
Sarah Robson	F	Canada	Lorne Park	Won a silver medal for Canada at the 2011 IIHF World U18 Championships and won a silver medal for Ontario at the 2011 Canada Winter Games
Lauren Vella	F	United States	Staten Island Tech	
Janice Yang	F	United States	Choate Rosemary Hall	

== Regular season ==
The 17th Annual Mayor's Cup will take place on November 25 versus the Providence Friars.

=== Standings ===
2011–12 Eastern College Athletic Conference standings
	Conference							Overall					
	GP	W	L	T	PTS	GF	GA	GP	W	L	T	GF	GA
#3Cornell	16	14	2	0	28	75	23	22	19	3	0	107	39
#8Harvard	16	11	4	1	23	51	24	22	14	7	1	75	42
#10Dartmouth	16	10	4	2	22	39	26	22	14	6	2	66	47
Clarkson	16	10	4	2	22	51	23	28	16	7	5	82	51
Quinnipiac	16	10	4	2	22	42	30	27	15	10	2	65	59
St. Lawrence	16	9	5	2	20	47	35	27	15	8	4	85	63
Princeton	16	7	7	2	16	35	28	23	9	10	4	49	48
Brown	16	4	8	4	12	22	42	23	7	9	7	50	51
Rensselaer	16	5	9	2	12	34	44	28	8	16	4	63	83
Colgate	16	3	12	1	7	26	56	27	8	18	1	57	81
Union	16	2	12	2	6	20	47	28	4	20	4	48	89
Yale	16	1	15	0	2	14	78	23	1	22	0	22	118
Championship: To be determined † indicates conference regular season champion * indicates conference tournament champion National rankings: Conference rankings: Updated February 1st, 2012

=== Schedule ===
Date	Opponent	Time	Score
Oct. 22	Sacred Heart	1:00 PM EDT	
Oct. 28	at Colgate	7:00 PM EDT	
Oct. 29	at Cornell	3:00 PM EDT	
Nov. 4	at Princeton	7:00 PM EDT	
Nov. 5	at Quinnipiac	4:00 PM EDT	
Nov. 11	Rensselaer	7:00 PM EST	
Nov. 12	Union	4:00 PM EST	
Nov. 18	at Maine	7:00 PM EST	
Nov. 19	at Maine	4:00 PM EST	
Nov. 25	Providence	7:00 PM EST	
Nov. 27	Boston College	2:00 PM	
Dec. 2	Quinnipiac	4:00 PM	
Dec. 3	Princeton	3:00 PM	
Dec. 7	at Yale	7:00 PM	
Jan. 5	at Sacred Heart	7:00 PM	
Jan. 7	at Connecticut	1:00 PM	
Jan. 13	St. Lawrence	7:00 PM	
Jan. 14	Clarkson	4:00 PM	
Jan. 20	at Union	7:00 PM	
Jan. 21	at Rensselaer	4:00 PM	
Jan. 24	Yale	7:00 PM	
Jan. 27	Dartmouth	7:00 PM	
Jan. 28	Harvard	4:00 PM	
Feb. 3	at Clarkson	7:00 PM	
Feb. 4	at St. Lawrence	4:00 PM	
Feb. 10	Cornell	7:00 PM	
Feb. 11	Colgate	4:00 PM	
Feb. 17	at Harvard	7:00 PM	
Feb. 18	at Dartmouth	4:00 PM	
