= 2011–12 Yale Bulldogs women's ice hockey season =

- Conference: ECAC
- Home ice: Ingalls Rink

Rankings
- USA Today/USA Hockey Magazine: Not ranked
- USCHO.com/CBS College Sports: Not ranked

Record

Coaches and captains
- Head coach: Joakim Flygh
- Assistant coaches: Jessica Koizumi
- Captain: Aleca Hughes

The Yale Bulldogs women's ice hockey team represented Yale University in the 2011–12 NCAA Division I women's ice hockey season. Senior Aleca Hughes was the team captain. The Bulldogs competed in the Nutmeg Classic on November 25 and 26.

== Offseason ==
- July 26: Incoming freshman goaltender Jaimie Leonoff has been selected to participate in Hockey Canada's National Women's Under-22 training camp. Said camp takes place at the Canadian Hockey Academy from August 6 to 16 in Rockland, Ontario.
- August 10: Jackee Snikeris and assistant coach Jessica Koizumi have both earned invitations to the 2011 USA Hockey Women's National Festival. The festival includes 79 players.

=== Recruiting ===
Player	Nationality	Position	Notes
Lynn Kennedy	Canada	Forward	Played with the Toronto Jr. Aeros; Markham District High School Female Athlete of the Year 2008, 2009 and 2011
Jaimie Leonoff	Canada	Goaltender	Earned bronze medal in ice hockey at the 2011 Canada Winter Games with Team Quebec and won two games Won North American friendship tournament with Belle Tire in 2011
Stephanie Mock	United States	Forward	She played for Mid Fairfield Connecticut Stars
Madi Murray	Canada	Defense	Played for the Edge School in Alberta; Won Under-18 National Championship with Shattuck-Saint Mary's in 2008-09
Kelsey Summers	United States	Forward	She was an assistant captain with Little Caesars in Michigan and was an All-MWEHL selection

== Regular season ==
- November 5, 2011: After leading 1-0 in the second period, Princeton extended their lead with three second-period goals. Bulldogs freshman forward Stephanie Mock scored her first career NCAA goal (it was the Bulldogs' only goal), assisted by team captain Aleca Hughes in a 7-1 loss.

=== Standings ===
2011–12 Eastern College Athletic Conference standings
	Conference							Overall					
	GP	W	L	T	PTS	GF	GA	GP	W	L	T	GF	GA
#3Cornell	16	14	2	0	28	75	23	22	19	3	0	107	39
#8Harvard	16	11	4	1	23	51	24	22	14	7	1	75	42
#10Dartmouth	16	10	4	2	22	39	26	22	14	6	2	66	47
Clarkson	16	10	4	2	22	51	23	28	16	7	5	82	51
Quinnipiac	16	10	4	2	22	42	30	27	15	10	2	65	59
St. Lawrence	16	9	5	2	20	47	35	27	15	8	4	85	63
Princeton	16	7	7	2	16	35	28	23	9	10	4	49	48
Brown	16	4	8	4	12	22	42	23	7	9	7	50	51
Rensselaer	16	5	9	2	12	34	44	28	8	16	4	63	83
Colgate	16	3	12	1	7	26	56	27	8	18	1	57	81
Union	16	2	12	2	6	20	47	28	4	20	4	48	89
Yale	16	1	15	0	2	14	78	23	1	22	0	22	118
Championship: To be determined † indicates conference regular season champion * indicates conference tournament champion National rankings: Conference rankings: Updated February 1st, 2012

=== Schedule ===
Date	Opponent	Time	Score
Fri, 10/21/2011	Niagara	7:00 PM	
Sat, 10/22/2011	Northeastern	4:00 PM	
Fri, 10/28/2011	at Cornell *	7:00 PM	
Sat, 10/29/2011	at Colgate *	4:00 PM	
Tue, 11/01/2011	at Providence	7:00 PM	
Fri, 11/04/2011	at Quinnipiac *	7:00 PM	
Sat, 11/05/2011	at Princeton *	4:00 PM	1-7
Fri, 11/11/2011	Union *	7:00 PM	
Sat, 11/12/2011	Rensselaer *	4:00 PM	
Fri, 11/18/2011	at Mercyhurst	7:00 PM	
Sat, 11/19/2011	at Mercyhurst	2:00 PM	
Fri, 11/25/2011	(Nutmeg Classic) vs. Robert Morris @ Storrs, Conn.	7:00 PM	0-1
Sat, 11/26/2011	(Nutmeg Classic Consolation Game) vs. Connecticut @ Storrs, Conn.		
Fri, 12/02/2011	Princeton *	7:00 PM	
Sat, 12/03/2011	Quinnipiac *	4:00 PM	
Wed, 12/07/2011	Brown *	7:00 PM	
Sat, 01/07/2012	McGill (Exhibition)	2:00 PM	
Fri, 01/13/2012	Clarkson *	7:00 PM	
Sat, 01/14/2012	St. Lawrence *	4:00 PM	
Fri, 01/20/2012	at Rensselaer *	7:00 PM	
Sat, 01/21/2012	at Union *	4:00 PM	
Tue, 01/24/2012	at Brown *	7:00 PM	
Fri, 01/27/2012	Harvard *	7:00 PM	
Sat, 01/28/2012	Dartmouth *	4:00 PM	
Fri, 02/03/2012	at St. Lawrence *	7:00 PM	
Sat, 02/04/2012	at Clarkson *	4:00 PM	
Fri, 02/10/2012	Colgate *	7:00 PM	
Sat, 02/11/2012	Cornell *	4:00 PM	
Fri, 02/17/2012	at Dartmouth *	7:00 PM	
Sat, 02/18/2012	at Harvard *	4:00 PM	

== Awards and honors ==
- Aleca Hughes, 2012 Sarah Devens Award Winner
- Aleca Hughes, 2012 Hockey Humanitarian Award Winner
- Aleca Hughes, 2012 Coach Wooden Citizenship Cup Award Winner
- New Haven Register 2011 Sportspeople of the Year (Yale women's ice hockey team)

=== Team awards ===
- Wendy Blanning Award (Most Improved): Danielle Moncion
- Most Valuable Player: Genevieve Ladiges
- Bingham Cup (Leadership): Aleca Hughes
- Mandi Schwartz Award (Spirit): Lynn Kennedy and Genevieve Ladiges
- Richard Brodhead ‘68 Award (Academic): Aleca Hughes
- Coaches Award: Lynn Kennedy
