= 2011–12 Hockey East women's season =

The 2011–12 Hockey East women's ice hockey season marked the continuation of the annual tradition of competitive ice hockey among Hockey East members.

== Exhibition ==
=== CIS Exhibition ===
Date	NCAA school	CIS school	Score	NCAA goal scorers
Oct. 1	Vermont	McGill	McGill, 3-2	Delia McNally, Meghan Huertas

== Regular season ==
=== News and notes ===
==== October ====
- In her Boston University Terriers debut on September 30, 2011, Isabel Menard logged three assists against North Dakota. The following day (also against North Dakota), Menard scored her first goal as a Terrier.

==== November ====
- November 3: The Vermont Catamounts won their first ever game at New Hampshire by a 4-1 tally at the Whittemore Center. Catamounts goalie Roxanne Douville made 33 saves, while freshman Amanda Pelkey notched a goal and an assist.
- November 18: Minnesota skater Amanda Kessel registered 5 points as the Golden Gophers defeated the New Hampshire Wildcats by an 11-0 tally. New Hampshire starting goalie Jenn Gilligan made 27 saves but allowed eight goals in two periods. She was replaced by Moe Bradley in the third period. Bradley stopped 11 of 14 shots as the Wildcats suffered their worst loss in the 35 year history of the program.
- November 26: New Hampshire Wildcats player Nicole Gifford scored the first hat trick of her career as the Wildcats defeated the Princeton Tigers by a 3-1 mark. The Wildcats improved to 38-5-2 lifetime against Princeton.

==== December ====
- December 22: In recognition of the ten-year anniversary of the Women's Hockey East Association, the Friars announced their Providence Hockey East All-Decade Team. Six forwards, five defenders and two goalies were honored.

Player	Position	Class of:
Jenn Butsch	Forward	2003
Ashley Payton	Forward	2006
Darlene Stephenson	Forward	2004
Karen Thatcher	Forward	2006
Sonny Watrous	Forward	2007
Rush Zimmerman	Forward	2005
Kristen Gigliotti	Defense	2007
Kelli Halcisak	Defense	2004
Erin Normore	Defense	2009
Meredith Roth	Defense	2004
Kathleen Smith	Defense	2008
Jana Bugden	Goaltender	2007
Genevieve Lacasse	Goaltender	2012

==== January ====
- January 10: The Dartmouth Big Green and Providence Friars played each other in an outdoor game at Fenway Park in Boston. Providence skater Brooke Simpson scored her first career NCAA goal. With 1:14 remaining in regulation, Big Green forward Camille Dumais scored the game-winning goal on Providence netminder Genevieve Lacasse as the Big Green prevailed by a 3-2 mark.
- January 22: Maine hosted Providence College for the Sixth Annual Hockey East Skating Strides Against Breast Cancer event. The Black Bears bested the Friars in an overtime finish by a 3-2 mark. Maine improved to 13-8-6 on the season and 7-6-2 in Hockey East play. Maine goals were scored by Brianne Kilgour, Brittany Dougherty and Danielle Ward. Mary Dempsey from the Patrick Dempsey Cancer Center participated in the ceremonial puck drop. Commemorative game jerseys with pink color were auctioned off after the game. In addition, the team participated in an autograph session in which all fans received a signed team photo.
- January 25: Kerrin Sperry recorded her first shutout of the season as she logged 30 saves. In addition, Isabel Menard logged the 100th point of her NCAA career as the Terriers prevailed over the rival Boston College Eagles by a 6-0 tally.
- January 29: The Huskies participated in the annual Hockey East Skating Strides game at the Freitas Ice Forum. Against the Providence Friars, the Huskies were defeated by a 5-2 mark. With the loss, the Huskies fell to 3-18-7 overall. The Huskies ended up being swept in the season series. In a pre-game ceremony, UConn presented Hockey East Associate Commissioner Kathy Winters with a donation of $10,000, representing the Friends of Mel Foundation. Of note, the Huskies set a program-record for funds raised in the Skating Strides event.

==== February ====
- February 11: Before the match against the Eagles, Connecticut announced the Connecticut Hockey East All-Decade Team (in commemoration of Hockey East’s 10th Anniversary). The forwards named included: Jennifer Chaisson, Jaclyn Hawkins and Tiffany Owens. The honored defenders included Cristin Allen and Natalie Vibert. Kaitlyn Shain was named All-Decade goaltender.
- February 17: Northeastern ended their 13 year Beanpot championship drought when Casey Pickett scored the game-winning goal in overtime past Boston University goaltender Kerrin Sperry. The Huskies prevailed by a 4-3 tally with the other Huskies goals scored by Kendall Coyne, Lucie Povova, and Sonia St. Martin. Huskies goaltender Florence Schelling made a season best 43 saves to claim her 17th win of the season.

=== Standings ===
2011–12 Hockey East Association standings
	Conference							Overall					
	GP	W	L	T	PTS	GF	GA	GP	W	L	T	GF	GA
#4 Boston College	16	11	3	2	24	41	29	28	18	7	3	76	55
#7 Northeastern	16	11	3	2	24	52	23	28	17	6	3	88	42
Boston University	16	9	7	0	18	46	38	28	15	12	1	78	74
Providence	16	8	7	1	17	47	36	29	11	15	3	74	70
Maine	15	7	6	2	16	42	37	27	13	8	6	81	65
New Hampshire	15	4	9	2	10	27	51	28	10	15	3	62	100
Vermont	15	3	10	2	8	26	50	26	4	16	6	47	95
Connecticut	15	2	10	3	7	20	37	28	3	18	7	42	81
Championship: To Be Determined † indicates conference regular season champion * indicates conference tournament champion National rankings: Conference rankings: Updated February 2nd, 2012

*Rankings based on number of points in the conference

=== In-season honors ===
==== Players of the week ====
Week	Player of the week
September 26	Danielle Ward, Maine
October 3	Jenn Wakefield, Boston University
October 10	Jenn Wakefield, Boston University; Danielle Ward, Maine
October 17	Casey Pickett, Northeastern and Taylor Wasylk, Boston College (tie)
October 24	Emily Field, Boston College
October 31	Brittany Dougherty, Maine
November 7	Laura Veharanta, Providence
November 14	Casey Pickett, Northeastern
November 21	Kayla Tutino, Boston University
November 28	Nicole Anderson, Providence; Dru Burns, Boston College)
December 5	Kendall Coyne, Northeastern
December 12	Alex Carpenter, Boston College
January 9	Mary Restuccia, Boston College
January 16	Kristina Lavoie, New Hampshire
January 23	Jenn Wakefield, Boston University
January 30	Kristina Lavoie, New Hampshire; Kristin Sperry, Boston University
February 6	Ashley Cottrell, Providence
February 13	
February 20	
February 27	Jenn Wakefield, Boston University

==== Defensive players of the week ====
Week	Player of the week
September 26	Melissa Gagnon, Maine
October 3	Kerrin Sperry, Boston University
October 10	Florence Schelling, Northeastern
October 17	Jenn Gilligan, New Hampshire
October 24	Nicole Paniccia, Connecticut
October 31	Brittany Ott, Maine
November 7	Florence Schelling, Northeastern; Kerrin Sperry, Boston University (tie)
November 14	Florence Schelling, Northeastern
November 21	Corinne Boyles, Boston College
November 28	Brittany Ott, Maine
December 5	Corinne Boyles, Boston College; Florence Schelling, Northeastern (tie)
December 12	Florence Schelling, Northeastern
January 9	Nina Riley, Providence
January 16	Brittany Ott, Maine
January 23	Kendall Coyne, Northeastern
January 30	Genevieve Lacasse, Providence
February 6	Florence Schelling, Northeastern
February 13	
February 20	
February 27	Genevieve Lacasse, Providence

==== Rookies of the week ====
Week	Player of the week
September 26	Jennifer More, Maine
October 3	Heather Kashman, New Hampshire
October 10	Alex Carpenter, Boston College
October 17	Kayla Tutino, Boston University
October 24	Beth Hanrahan, Providence; Lucie Povova, Northeastern
October 31	Kendall Coyne, Northeastern
November 7	Amanda Pelkey, Vermont
November 14	Tori Pasquariello, Maine
November 21	Emily Snodgrass, Connecticut
November 28	Kendall Coyne, Northeastern
December 5	Kayla Campero, Connecticut
December 12	Jenna Lascelle, New Hampshire
January 9	Kayla Tutino, Boston University
January 16	Jennifer More, Maine
January 23	Brittany Ott, Maine; Florence Schelling, Northeastern
January 30	Amanda Pelkey, Vermont
February 6	Emily Snodgrass, Connecticut
February 13	
February 20	
February 27	Kayla Tutino, Boston University

==== Team of the week ====
Week	Player of the week
September 26	Maine Black Bears
October 3	New Hampshire Wildcats
October 10	Maine Black Bears
October 10	Boston College Eagles
October 17	
October 24	Boston College Eagles
October 31	Maine Black Bears
November 7	Providence Friars
November 14	Providence Friars
November 21	Boston College Eagles
November 28	Maine Black Bears
December 5	Northeastern Huskies
December 12	
January 9	Boston University Terriers
January 16	Maine Black Bears
January 23	Northeastern Huskies
January 30	Boston University Terriers
February 6	Providence Friars
February 13	
February 20	
February 27	Boston University Terriers

=== Monthly awards ===
==== Player of the month ====
Month	Player of the month
October 2011	Jennifer Wakefield, Boston University
November 2011	Kendall Coyne, Northeastern
December 2011	Kendall Coyne, Northeastern
January 2012	Jennifer Wakefield, Boston University
February 2012	

==== Goaltender of the month ====
Month	Player of the month
October 2011	Florence Schelling, Northeastern
November 2011	Corinne Boyles, Boston College
December 2011	Corinne Boyles, Boston College
January 2012	Brittany Ott, Maine
February 2012	

==== Rookie of the month ====
Month	Player of the month
October 2011	Alex Carpenter, Boston College
November 2011	Tori Pasquariello, Maine
December 2011	Alex Carpenter, Boston College
January 2012	Kendall Coyne, Northeastern
February 2012	

== Hockey East tournament ==
Round	Date	Teams	Arena	Final score	Notes
Quarterfinals	Feb. 25	No. 5 Maine at No. 4 Providence College	Schneider Arena, Providence, R.I.		
Quarterfinals	Feb. 26	No. 6 New Hampshire at No. 3 Boston University	Walter Brown Arena, Boston, Mass.		
Semifinals	Mar. 3	Providence vs. No. 1 Northeastern	Kennedy Rink, Hyannis Youth and Community Center		
Semifinals	Mar. 3	Boston University vs. No. 2 Boston College	Kennedy Rink, Hyannis Youth and Community Center		
Finals	Mar. 4	Boston University vs. Providence	Kennedy Rink, Hyannis Youth and Community Center		

== Hockey East 10th Anniversary Team ==
On February 29, 2012, Hockey East named its 10th Anniversary Team, along with a group of Honorable Mention players.

Position	Player	HEA school	Final season
Goalie	Chanda Gunn	Northeastern	2004
Goalie	Molly Schaus	Boston College	2011
Defense	Cristin Allen	Connecticut	2010
Defense	Kacey Bellamy	New Hampshire	2009
Defense	Martine Garland	New Hampshire	2008
Defense	Kelly Halcisak	Providence	2004
Forward	Sam Haber	New Hampshire	2009
Forward	Kelly Paton	New Hampshire	2010
Forward	Kelli Stack	Boston College	2011
Forward	Karen Thatcher	Providence	2006
Forward	Jennifer Wakefield	Boston University	2012

=== Honorable mention ===
Position	Player	HEA school	Final season
Goalie	Florence Schelling	Northeastern	2012
Defense	Courtney Birchard	New Hampshire	2011
Defense	Kristin Gigliotti	Providence	2007
Defense	Maggie Taverna	Boston College	2009
Defense	Tara Watchorn	Boston University	2012
Forward	Jaclyn Hawkins	Connecticut	2008
Forward	Jenn Hitchcock	New Hampshire	2008
Forward	Allie Thunstrom	Boston College	2010

== End-of-season awards ==
- Best Defender, Kasey Boucher, BU
- Gladiator Best Defensive Forward: Casey Pickett, Northeastern
- Sportsmanship Award: Ashely Cottrell, PC
- Turfer Athletic Award, Kelly Wallace, Northeastern
- Scoring Champion, Jenn Wakefield, BU
- Goaltending Champion, Florence Schelling (1.27 GAA, .956 %), Northeastern

=== WHEA All-Rookie Team ===
- Forward: Alex Carpenter, BC (unanimous choice)
- Forward: Kendall Coyne, Northeastern (unanimous choice)
- Forward: Emily Field, BC
- Forward:Amanda Pelkey, Vermont
- Forward: Kayla Tutino, BU
- Defense:Emily Pfalzer, BC (unanimous choice)

== See also ==
- National Collegiate Women's Ice Hockey Championship
- 2010–11 Hockey East women's ice hockey season
- 2011–12 WCHA women's ice hockey season
- 2011–12 ECAC women's ice hockey season
- 2011–12 CHA women's ice hockey season
