= Andrew Holmes (activist) =

American activist (born 1959 or 1960)

- Holmes in 2023

Dolton Village Trustee
- Incumbent
- Assumed office May 2019
- Preceded by: Valeria Stubbs; Robert E. Pierson Jr.; Duane Muhammad

Personal details
- Born: 1959 or 1960 (age 66–67)
- Party: Democratic Party

Andrew V. Holmes (born 1959 or 1960) is a community activist active in the Chicago metropolitan area. He is especially known for his activism related to combatting gun violence, and is also active in advocacy for senior citizens and the homeless.

Since 2019, Holmes has served as a village trustee (city councilman) in the Chicago suburb of Dolton, Illinois. Holmes unsuccessfully ran for mayor of Dolton in 2021, losing to Tiffany Henyard. He aligned himself politically with Henyard during her controversial mayoralty.

== Early life ==
Holmes grew up both in the Englewood neighborhood of Chicago, as well as in Montgomery, Alabama.

== Community activism ==
Holmes became a community activist in the mid-1990s after being mentored by Chicago alderman (city councilman) Terry Peterson, who he worked as an aide to.

=== Gun violence ===
Holmes' has been a prominent advocate on behalf of gun violence victims. He has often appeared on local Chicago television news broadcasts to discuss the matter. He has also often acted as a liaison between community members in gun violence-stricken neighborhoods in the Chicago area and the police, as he is regarded as having earned the trust of many residents. Local police have credited him with aiding in their investigations into incidents of gun violence.

In 2015, Holmes faced personal tragedy with gun violence when his 32-year-old daughter, Tamara Sword, was fatally shot at a gas station in Indianapolis.

Holmes worked as a crisis manager for the Chicago Survivors organization. Holmes has also distributed gun safety cable locks as a means of decreasing accidental household gun fatalities, particularly those involving children. The group terminated his role in May 2024 after allegations of sexual assault were made against Holmes.

Holmes' titular Andrew Holmes Foundation had partnered with the Kendall and Michael Schofield Family Foundation (operated by athletes Kendall Coyne Schofield and Michael Schofield) to host winter holiday events for Chicago families who have been impacted by gun violence, as well as in its efforts to distribute gun safety locks.

=== Senior citizens ===
Holmes worked for Illinois State Representative Milton Patterson, who tasked him with focusing on the needs of senior citizens in his district. Holmes became aware that many elderly residents in the district had been victims of crime and abuse. Holmes began working with local police to solve cases involving elder victimization. He also began a tradition of giving roses to nursing homes residents on Mother's Day and baseball caps to residents of nursing homes on Father's Day.

In the 2010s, Holmes founded Club 100, for which his foundation organizes a banquet and party for local centenarians. He has opened the annual event up to also honor 99-year-olds, after some residents of that age asked him to out of concern that they might not personally live to 100.

=== Homelessness ===
For many years, Holmes annually protested outside of Chicago City Hall by sleeping outside on a cold day to draw attention to the need for the city to provide warm shelter for its homeless.

In late 2023, Holmes partnered with a radio station to distribute warm clothes to the homeless in Chicago, and urged the city government to do more to find housing for its homeless.

=== Other matters ===
Holmes has lectured on matters such as human trafficking.

In late-2021, Holmes helped the Chicago Police Department apprehend his own brother for committing package theft. He said that he could serve as an example for others whose relatives commit crimes.

== Dolton village trustee and 2021 mayoral campaign ==
In the late-2010s, Holmes began living in Dolton, Illinois. In 2019, Holmes was elected as village trustee (city councilor) of Dolton. He was one of three candidates elected in the plurality-at-large election for seats that year. He won nomination in Democratic Party primary election as part of the successful three-candidate "New Dolton Democrats" slate endorsed by Mayor Riley Rogers. Dolton's elections tend to be more competitive than those in most other municipalities in the Chicago area's "southland" region, often seeing many candidates run. In 2019, eleven candidates sought election in the primary.

Holmes ran for mayor of Dolton in 2021. His candidacy was centered on government transparency and fixing basic infrastructure in the city. Holmes ran in a four-person Democratic primary election against incumbent mayor Riley Rogers, fellow village trustee Tiffany Henyard, and Robert Shaw (a politician who was the brother of the deceased past Dolton mayor William Shaw). He placed third, behind Henyard and Rogers. Henyard went on to win the general election. Subsequently, during Henyard's controversial mayoralty, Holmes has been a prime ally and defender of her on the village board.

In September 2021, Holmes was the only village trustee to vote in support of Henyard's request to hire a media consultant at a pay rate of $3,000 per month. This request was rejected by the village board of trustees by a vote of 5–1.

In his successful 2023 reelection, Holmes was endorsed by Mayor Henyard, who also endorsed Stan Brown. Henyard also supported the unsuccessful primary election write-in candidacy of Joslyn King and the also-unsuccessful general election write-in candidacy of Linda Terell. The Chicago Tribune observed that Holmes had previously been Henyard's sole ally on the board, and that Brown's election alongside Holmes meant that Henyard's number of allies on the six-member board increased from one to two. Opponents of Henyard's had attempted to challenge Holmes' candidacy, alleging he did not truly reside in Dolton and therefore failed to meet residency requirements. In the same election cycle, Holmes filed a challenge with the Cook County Clerk's Office against former mayor Rogers' nominating papers to run for an additional term on the Thornton Township Trustees of Schools Board.

In February 2024, Holmes opposed cuts in the village's budget, which were passed over the veto of Mayor Henyard.

== Personal life ==
Holmes has had six children. In 2015, his daughter Tamara Sword (a 32-year-old mother of five children) was fatally shot at a gas station in Indianapolis. Two men were arrested for her shooting. It was believed she had been caught in crossfire. Her murder, as of 2020, remained unsolved.

In 2021, Holmes was involved in a multi-vehicle traffic collision that saw a Chicago Transit Authority bus hit his car after running through a red traffic light.

In 2023, one of Holmes' grandchildren was injured in a mass shooting that occurred in Indianapolis.

In April 2024, a lawsuit was filed which alleged that Holmes sexually assaulted a Dolton village employee while on a May 2023 Dolton-related business trip to Las Vegas. In October 2024, the Las Vegas Metropolitan Police Department closed an investigation without filing any charges. In October 2025, the village settled the lawsuit. In September 2025, a separate lawsuit was filed accusing Holmes of sexually assaulting a minor.

== Electoral history ==
2019 Dolton village trustees Democratic primary
Party	Candidate	Votes	%
Democratic	Andrew Holmes	1,363	17.42
Democratic	Tammie Brown	1,170	14.95
Democratic	Edward "Ed" Steave	1,054	13.47
Democratic	Stanley "Stan" Brown	904	11.55
Democratic	Robert E. Hunt, Jr.	750	9.58
Democratic	Alison Key	644	8.23
Democratic	Valeria Stubbs (incumbent)	516	6.59
Democratic	Robert E. Pierson, Jr. (incumbent)	436	5.57
Democratic	Duane Muhammad (incumbent)	427	5.46
Democratic	Alfred "AJ" Burse	350	4.47
Democratic	Kevin A. Boens	211	2.70
Total votes		7,825	100

2019 Dolton village trustees election
Party	Candidate	Votes	%
Democratic	Tammie Brown	1,000	33.59
Democratic	Andrew Holmes	992	29.52
Democratic	Edward "Ed" Steave	918	30.84
Write-In	Others	67	2.25
Total votes		2,977	100

2021 Dolton mayoral Democratic primary election
Party	Candidate	Votes	%
Democratic	Tiffany A. Henyard	1,001	34.28
Democratic	Riley H. Rogers (incumbent)	888	30.41
Democratic	Andrew Holmes	862	29.52
Democratic	Robert Shaw	169	5.79
Total votes		2,920	100

2023 Dolton village trustees Democratic primary
Party	Candidate	Votes	%
Democratic	Andrew V. Holmes (incumbent)	1,489	19.27
Democratic	Stanley "Stan" Brown	1,354	17.52
Democratic	Tammie Brown (incumbent)	1,026	13.28
Democratic	Edward "Ed" Steave (incumbent)	979	12.67
Write-In	Joselyn King	791	10.24
Democratic	Samysha "Mesha" Williams	772	9.99
Democratic	Valeria Stubbs	549	7.10
Democratic	Demetrious Walker	318	4.11
Democratic	Danny Fields	237	3.07
Democratic	Carlton Higgins	213	2.76
Total votes		7,728	100

2023 Dolton village trustees election
Party	Candidate	Votes	%
Democratic	Andrew V. Holmes (incumbent)	1,699	31.00
Democratic	Stanley "Stan" Brown	1,687	30.78
Democratic	Tammie Brown (incumbent)	1,515	27.64
Write-In	Linda Terell	580	10.58
Total votes		5,481	100
