= 2011–12 Northeastern Huskies women's ice hockey season =

Beanpot Champions
- Conference: ECAC
- Home ice: Matthews Arena

Record

Coaches and captains
- Head coach: Dave Flint
- Assistant coaches: Linda Lundrigan; Lauren McAuliffe

== Offseason ==
- August 19: Incoming freshman Kendall Coyne was selected for the United States squad that will compete in the 2011 IIHF 12 Nations Tournament series to be contested from August 24–31, in Vierumäki, Finland.
- Sept.13: Head coach Dave Flint announced that the Huskies will have three captains for the upcoming season. Dani Rylan, Stephanie Gavronsky and Casey Pickett were selected.

=== Recruiting ===
| Player | Nationality | Position | Height | Shoots | Hometown | Former team |
| Ayla Frank | Canada | G | 5-7 | Left | Labrador City, Newfoundland | Rothesay Netherwood School |
| Colleen Murphy | United States | D | 5-4 | Right | Cary, N.C. | North American Hockey Academy |
| Ann Doherty | United States | D | 5-4 | Right | Park Ridge, Ill. | Assabet Valley |
| Chelsiea Goll | United States | F | 5-3 | Right | Winthrop, Mass. | Brewster Academy |
| Chelsey Goldberg | United States | F | 5-6 | Right | Agoura Hills, Calif. | North American Hockey Academy |
| Chloe Desjardins | Canada | G | 5-8 | Left | Saint-Prosper, Beauce, Quebec | Brewster Academy |
| Leanne Gallant | Canada | D | 5-7 | Left | Newbridge, New Brunswick | Oakville |
| Kendall Coyne | United States | F | 5-2 | Left | Palos Heights, Ill. | Berkshire |
| Lucie Povová | Czech Republic | F | 5-7 | Left | Cizkovice, Czech Republic | Wyoming Seminary |

== Exhibition ==
| Date | Opponent | Location | Time | Score |
| 9/23/2011 | OTTAWA (exhibition) | Matthews Arena | 7 p.m. | |

== Regular season ==
On January 15, Northeastern will participate in The Bog in Kingston, Mass. Their opponents will be the Providence Friars.

=== Standings ===
2011–12 Hockey East Association standings
| | Conference | | | | | | | Overall | | | | | |
| | GP | W | L | T | PTS | GF | GA | GP | W | L | T | GF | GA |
|---|---|---|---|---|---|---|---|---|---|---|---|---|---|
| #4 Boston College | 16 | 11 | 3 | 2 | 24 | 41 | 29 | 28 | 18 | 7 | 3 | 76 | 55 |
| #7 Northeastern | 16 | 11 | 3 | 2 | 24 | 52 | 23 | 28 | 17 | 6 | 3 | 88 | 42 |
| Boston University | 16 | 9 | 7 | 0 | 18 | 46 | 38 | 28 | 15 | 12 | 1 | 78 | 74 |
| Providence | 16 | 8 | 7 | 1 | 17 | 47 | 36 | 29 | 11 | 15 | 3 | 74 | 70 |
| Maine | 15 | 7 | 6 | 2 | 16 | 42 | 37 | 27 | 13 | 8 | 6 | 81 | 65 |
| New Hampshire | 15 | 4 | 9 | 2 | 10 | 27 | 51 | 28 | 10 | 15 | 3 | 62 | 100 |
| Vermont | 15 | 3 | 10 | 2 | 8 | 26 | 50 | 26 | 4 | 16 | 6 | 47 | 95 |
| Connecticut | 15 | 2 | 10 | 3 | 7 | 20 | 37 | 28 | 3 | 18 | 7 | 42 | 81 |
Championship: To Be Determined † indicates conference regular season champion * indicates conference tournament champion National rankings: Conference rankings: Updated February 2nd, 2012

*Rankings based on number of points in the conference

=== Schedule ===
| Date | Opponent | Location | Time | Score |
| 10/7/2011 | SYRACUSE | Matthews Arena | 3 p.m. | |
| 10/8/2011 | COLGATE | Matthews Arena | 3 p.m. | 5-0 |
| 10/14/2011 | UNION | Matthews Arena | 3 p.m. | |
| 10/15/2011 | QUINNIPIAC | Matthews Arena | 2 p.m. | |
| 10/21/2011 | at Princeton | Princeton, N.J. | 7 p.m. | |
| 10/22/2011 | at Yale | New Haven, Conn. | 3 p.m. | |
| 10/28/2011 | at Maine | Orono, Maine | 2 p.m. | |
| 11/4/2011 | CONNECTICUT | Matthews Arena | 7 p.m. | |
| 11/5/2011 | at Connecticut | Storrs, Conn. | 4 p.m. | |
| 11/11/2011 | at Vermont | Burlington, Vt. | 7 p.m. | |
| 11/12/2011 | at Vermont | Burlington, Vt. | 2 p.m. | |
| 11/17/2011 | BOSTON COLLEGE | Matthews Arena | 7 p.m. | |
| 11/18/2011 | at Boston College | Chestnut Hill, Mass. | 7 p.m. | |
| 11/26/2011 | at Dartmouth | Hanover, N.H. | 4 p.m. | |
| 11/30/2011 | BOSTON UNIVERSITY | Matthews Arena | 7 p.m. | |
| 12/3/2011 | at New Hampshire | Durham, N.H. | 2 p.m. | |
| 12/4/2011 | NEW HAMPSHIRE | Matthews Arena | 2 p.m. | |
| 12/7/2011 | BOSTON UNIVERSITY | Matthews Arena | 7 p.m. | |
| 1/5/2012 | CLARKSON | Matthews Arena | 3 p.m. | |
| 1/6/2012 | ST. LAWRENCE | Matthews Arena | 3 p.m. | |
| 1/11/2012 | at Boston College | Chestnut Hill, Mass. | 7 p.m. | |
| 1/15/2012 | at Providence | Kingston, Mass. | 2 p.m. | |
| 1/21/2012 | NEW HAMPSHIRE | Matthews Arena | 2 p.m. | |
| 1/22/2012 | VERMONT | Matthews Arena | 2 p.m. | |
| 1/28/2012 | at Boston University | Boston, Mass. | 3 p.m. | |
| 1/31/2012 | vs Boston College | Boston, Mass. 5 p.m. | | |
| 2/4/2012 | CONNECTICUT | Matthews Arena | 2 p.m. | |
| 2/7/2012 | vs Boston University | Boston, Mass. | | 4-3 (OT) |
| 2/11/2012 | MAINE | Matthews Arena | 2 p.m. | |
| 2/12/2012 | MAINE | Matthews Arena | 2 p.m. | |
| 2/17/2012 | at Providence | Providence, R.I. | 7 p.m. | |
| 2/19/2012 | PROVIDENCE | Matthews Arena | 4 p.m. | |

== Awards and honors ==
- Kendall Coyne, Hockey East Rookie of the Week (Week of October 31, 2011)
- Kendall Coyne, Hockey East Rookie of the Week (Week of November 28, 2011)
- Kendall Coyne, Hockey East Player of the Month (Month of December 2011)
- Kendall Coyne, Hockey East Rookie of the Week (Week of January 23, 2012)
- Lucie Povová, Hockey East Co-Rookie of the Week (Week of October 24, 2011)
- Florence Schelling, Hockey East Goaltender of the Month (Month of October 2011)
- Florence Schelling, Hockey East Defensive Player of the Week (Week of November 7, 2011)
- Florence Schelling, Hockey East Co-Defensive Player of the Week (Week of January 23, 2012)
- Florence Schelling, Hockey East Defensive Player of the Week (Week of February 6, 2012)
- Florence Schelling, Runner-Up, Hockey East Defensive Player of the Month (Month of January 2012)
- Northeastern Huskies, Hockey East Team of the Week (Week of January 23, 2012)

=== Hockey East 10th Anniversary Team ===
- Chanda Gunn, selection
- Florence Schelling, Honorable Mention
