= Michael Schofield (American football) =

American football player (born 1990)

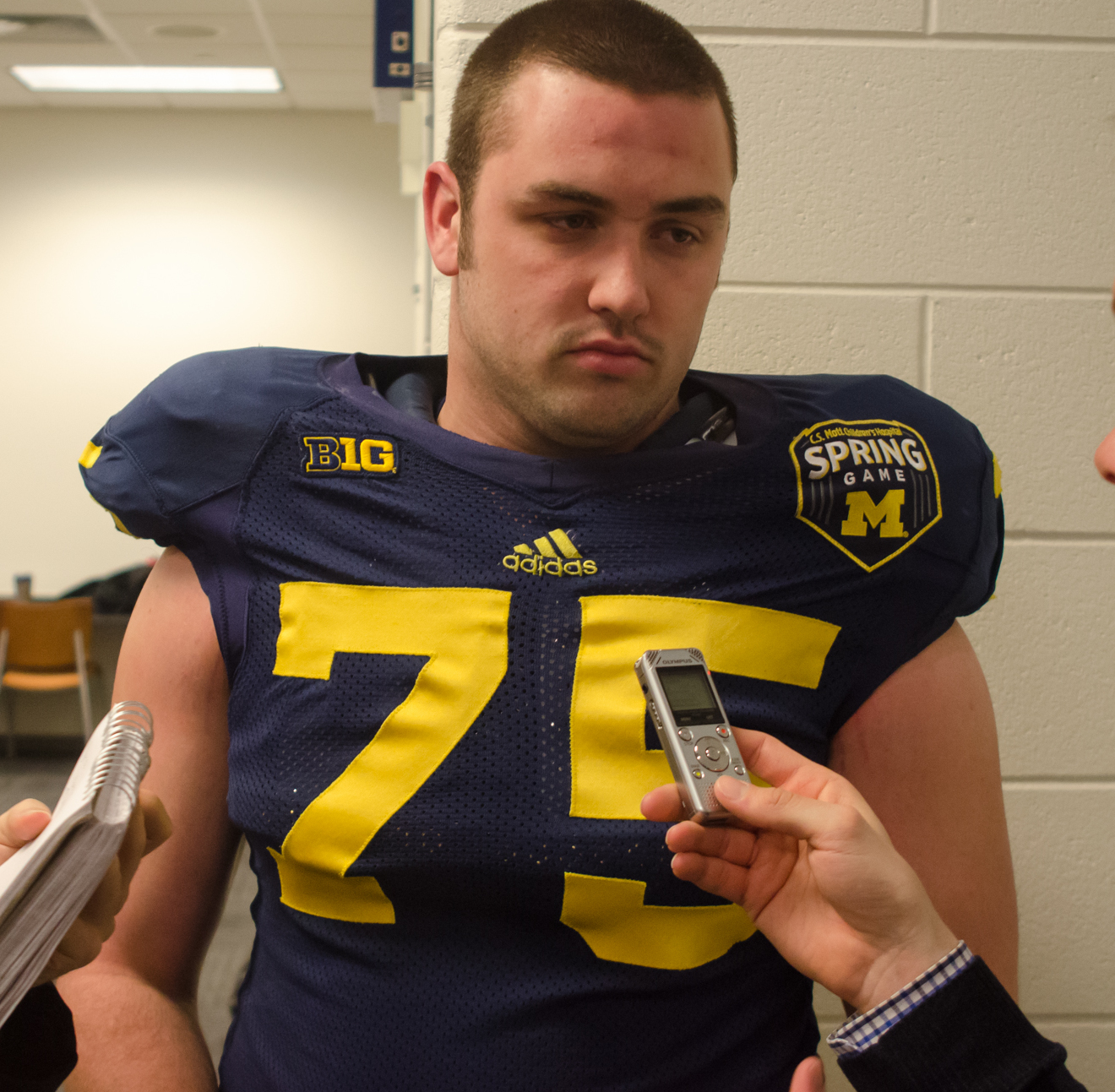
- Schofield with the Michigan Wolverines in 2013

No. 79, 78, 75, 72, 73, 71
- Position: Offensive guard

Personal information
- Born: November 15, 1990 (age 36); Orland Park, Illinois, U.S.
- Listed height: 6 ft 6 in (1.98 m)
- Listed weight: 301 lb (137 kg)

Career information
- High school: Carl Sandburg (Orland Park)
- College: Michigan (2009–2013)
- NFL draft: 2014: 3rd round, 95th overall pick

Career history
- Denver Broncos (2014–2016); Los Angeles Chargers (2017–2019); Carolina Panthers (2020); Baltimore Ravens (2021)*; Los Angeles Chargers (2021); Chicago Bears (2022); Detroit Lions (2023)*
- * Offseason or practice squad member only

Awards and highlights
- Super Bowl champion (50); Second-team All-Big Ten (2013)

Career NFL statistics
- Games played: 113
- Games started: 86
- Stats at Pro Football Reference

Michael Ross Schofield III (born November 15, 1990) is an American former professional football player who was an offensive guard in the National Football League (NFL). He was selected by the Denver Broncos in the third round of the 2014 NFL draft and was on their Super Bowl 50 championship team. He has also played in the NFL for the Los Angeles Chargers, Carolina Panthers, Chicago Bears, Baltimore Ravens and the Detroit Lions. He played college football for the Michigan Wolverines. He is married to Kendall Coyne Schofield of the Minnesota Frost.

== Early life ==
Schofield was born in Orland Park, Illinois. Schofield's father, Michael Schofield II, is a local fire chief.

Schofield liked baseball as a youth, but tagged along with his younger brother, Andrew, who liked to play football. He started to compete in football in sixth grade for the Orland Park Pioneers. In seventh grade, he played wide receiver and linebacker. As a sophomore at Sandburg High School, he became a lineman. By the time he was a senior, he was a special mention, 2008 Chicago Tribune All-State selection. Schofield signed with Michigan head coach Rich Rodriguez on February 4, 2009.

College recruiting
Name	Hometown	School	Height	Weight	Commit date
Michael Schofield; OT	Orland Park, Illinois	Sandburg (IL)	6 ft 6.5 in (1.99 m)	271 lb (123 kg)	Jun 16, 2008
Michael Schofield; OT	Recruit ratings: Scout: Rivals: (77)				
Overall recruit ranking: Scout: 135, 10 (OT) Rivals: 221, 18 (OT), 6 (IL) ESPN: 40 (OT)
Note: In many cases, Scout, Rivals, 247Sports, On3, and ESPN may conflict in their listings of height and weight.; In these cases, the average was taken. ESPN grades are on a 100-point scale.; Sources: "Michigan Football Commitments". Rivals.; "2009 Michigan Football Commits". Scout.; "ESPN". ESPN.; "Scout.com Team Recruiting Rankings". Scout.; "2009 Team Ranking". Rivals.com.

== College career ==
Schofield earned 2013 All-Big Ten Conference honorable mention recognition from the coaches. He excelled in the pre 2014 Senior Bowl workouts earning NFL Network player of the day on Wednesday January 22. He worked out two days at offensive guard position (where he played as a sophomore for the 2011 Wolverines) before moving back to tackle where he played for the 2012 and 2013 teams.

== Professional career ==
Pre-draft measurables
Height	Weight	Arm length	Hand span	40-yard dash	10-yard split	20-yard split	20-yard shuttle	Three-cone drill	Vertical jump	Broad jump
6 ft 6 1/2 in (1.99 m)	301 lb (137 kg)	34 in (0.86 m)	9 5/8 in (0.24 m)	5.01 s	1.73 s	2.93 s	4.57 s	7.62 s	24.0 in (0.61 m)	7 ft 9 in (2.36 m)
All values from NFL Combine

=== Denver Broncos ===
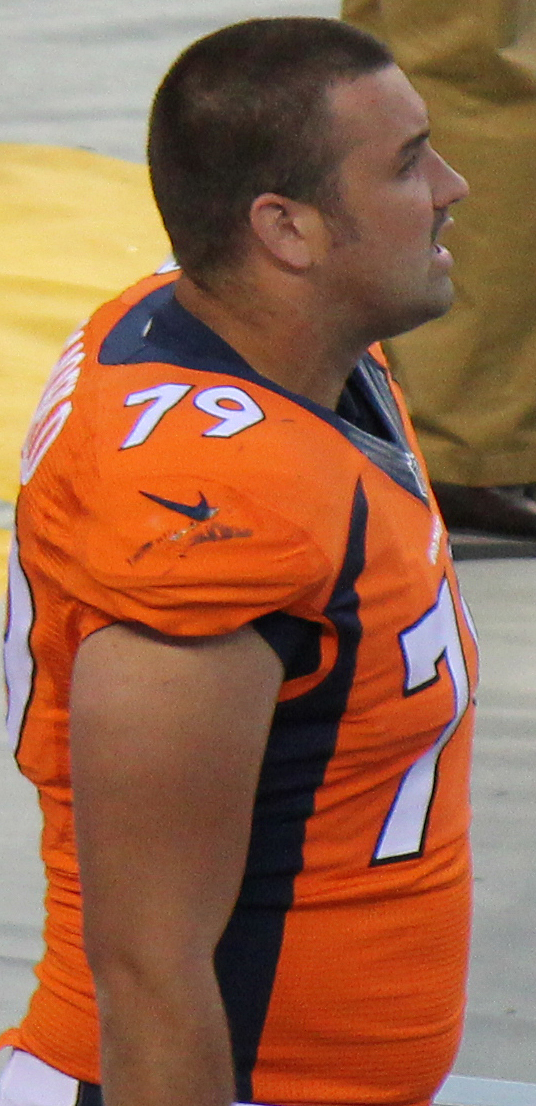
Schofield with the Denver Broncos in 2014

On the second day of the 2014 NFL draft, the Denver Broncos selected Schofield in the third round (95th overall). He was expected to sign a four-year contract worth approximately $2,761,200. On June 3, Schofield signed a four-year $2.75 million contract that included a $521,200 signing bonus. On February 7, 2016, Schofield was a starter on the Broncos Super Bowl 50 championship team that beat the Carolina Panthers by a score of 24–10. On September 2, 2017, Schofield was waived by the Broncos.

=== Los Angeles Chargers (first stint) ===
On September 3, 2017, Schofield was claimed off waivers by the Los Angeles Chargers. He played in 15 games, starting five in place of the injured Joe Barksdale at right tackle. With the Chargers, he played alongside high school teammate Dan Feeney. On March 14, 2018, Schofield signed a two-year contract extension with the Chargers. He started all 16 games at right guard for the Chargers in 2018. He started all 16 games in 2019, playing 995 snaps at right guard for the Chargers.

=== Carolina Panthers ===
On May 2, 2020, Schofield signed with the Carolina Panthers, where he was reunited with former Broncos and Chargers offensive line teammate Russell Okung under former Chargers offensive line coach Pat Meyer, who held the same position with the Panthers. Schofield was placed on the reserve/COVID-19 list by the Panthers on October 19, 2020, and activated on November 4.

=== Baltimore Ravens ===
On June 8, 2021, Schofield signed a one-year deal with the Baltimore Ravens. He was released on August 30, 2021.

=== Los Angeles Chargers (second stint) ===
On September 17, 2021, Schofield signed with the Chargers. He started 12 games at right guard in place of an injured Oday Aboushi.

=== Chicago Bears ===
On July 25, 2022, Schofield signed with the Chicago Bears. He was released on August 30, 2022. On September 14, Schofield was re-signed by the Bears to their active roster. Schofield made his first start of the season at left guard in a week 7 victory over the New England Patriots on Monday Night Football. On January 4, 2023, Schofield was placed on injured reserve.

=== Detroit Lions ===
On November 14, 2023, the Detroit Lions signed Schofield to their practice squad. He was released on December 21. Schofield was re-signed to the practice squad on December 29. He was not signed to a reserve/future contract after the season and thus became a free agent when his practice squad contract expired.

On September 5, 2024, Schofield announced his retirement from football.

== Personal life ==
Schofield is married to Kendall Coyne Schofield, a forward for the U.S. women's national ice hockey team who won the gold medal at the 2018 Winter Olympics in Pyeongchang. They both attended the same high school in Orland Park, but didn't start to date until they were both college-age athletes and met at a local gym. They wed in July 2018. Together, they have a son Drew (b. 2023).

On March 1, 2021, the Chicago Red Stars of the National Women's Soccer League announced that Schofield and his spouse Kendall Coyne Schofield had joined the women's soccer team's ownership group.

=== Foundation ===
Schofield and his wife operate the Kendall and Michael Schofield Family Foundation. In 2023, the foundation sponsored renovation of Schussler Park in Schofield's hometown of Orland Park. A portion of the park redevelopment was renamed to the "Michael Schofield III Sports Complex" in recognition of the foundation's funding.

The foundation had partnered with the activist Andrew Holmes's titular Andrew Holmes Foundation to organize winter holiday events for Chicago families who had been impacted by gun violence. Additionally, in 2022 and 2023 the Schofields joined Holmes in distributing gun safety locks to help prevent household gun incidents involving children. The Schofields provided 500 locks themselves.
