= 2011–12 Boston University Terriers women's ice hockey season =

- Conference: Hockey East
- Home ice: Agganis Arena

Rankings
- USA Today/USA Hockey Magazine: 5
- USCHO.com/CBS College Sports: 5

Record

Coaches and captains
- Head coach: Brian Durocher

The Boston University Terriers women's ice hockey team represented Boston University in the 2011–12 NCAA Division I women's ice hockey season. The Terriers were coached by Brian Durocher. The seniors on the Terriers squad were Kasey Boucher, Jenn Wakefield, Carly Warren and Tara Watchorn. Boston University won its second Hockey East Championship in three seasons. In addition, the Terriers qualified for their third consecutive NCAA Tournament appearance. At season's end, BU recorded a 23–14–1 record, marking the program's second straight 20-win season. The club triumphed in seven of its final eight games of the year, while earning a fifth-place ranking.

== Offseason ==
=== Recruiting ===
Player	Position	Nationality	Notes
Sarah Bayersdorfer	Defence	United States	Coached by former NHLer Bruce Driver
Kayla Tutino	Forward	Canada	Attended Ontario Hockey Academy

== Exhibition ==
Date	Opponent	Location	Time	Score	Record	Conference Record	Goal scorers
09/24/11	vs. Ottawa (PWHL) ^	Walter Brown Arena	3:00 p.m. ET				

== Regular season ==
- In her Terriers debut on September 30, 2011, Isabel Menard logged three assists against North Dakota. The following day (also against North Dakota), Menard scored her first goal as a Terrier.
- October 7: A contest versus Niagara resulted in the first assist and goal of Kayla Tutino's NCAA career. The first career point came on an assist, while she scored a shorthanded goal to help the Terriers to a 3–1 win.
- October 15: Against the Union Dutchwomen, Kayla Tutino notched the first hat trick of her career in a 6–2 triumph. Team captain Jenn Wakefield notched a pair of goals. Jenelle Kohanchuk logged three assists. Jill Cardella and Kaleigh Fratkin each contributed with two assists. Goaltender Braly Hiller made 27 saves to gain the first win of her NCAA victory. Freshman Sarah Bayersdorfer recorded the first assist of her career.
- From October 15 to 22, Kayla Tutino scored five goals in a three-game span.
- November 19 and 20: Kayla Tutino scored the game-winning goals in both games. The first game-winning goal came in a 4–2 victory over the Connecticut Huskies, while the second came in a 3–2 win over Providence.
- In a January 8, 2012 match versus the Maine Black Bears, Kayla Tutino scored the game-winning goal in a 2–1 victory.
- January 25: Kerrin Sperry recorded her first shutout of the season as she logged 30 saves. In addition, Isabel Menard logged the 100th point of her NCAA career as the Terriers prevailed over the rival Boston College Eagles by a 6-0 tally.

=== Standings ===
2011–12 Hockey East Association standings
	Conference							Overall					
	GP	W	L	T	PTS	GF	GA	GP	W	L	T	GF	GA
#4 Boston College	16	11	3	2	24	41	29	28	18	7	3	76	55
#7 Northeastern	16	11	3	2	24	52	23	28	17	6	3	88	42
Boston University	16	9	7	0	18	46	38	28	15	12	1	78	74
Providence	16	8	7	1	17	47	36	29	11	15	3	74	70
Maine	15	7	6	2	16	42	37	27	13	8	6	81	65
New Hampshire	15	4	9	2	10	27	51	28	10	15	3	62	100
Vermont	15	3	10	2	8	26	50	26	4	16	6	47	95
Connecticut	15	2	10	3	7	20	37	28	3	18	7	42	81
Championship: To Be Determined † indicates conference regular season champion * indicates conference tournament champion National rankings: Conference rankings: Updated February 2nd, 2012

*Rankings based on number of points in the conference

=== Schedule ===
Date	Opponent	Location	Time	Score	Record	Conference Record	Goal scorers
09/30/11	vs. North Dakota	Walter Brown Arena	7:00 p.m. ET	4-1	1-0-0	0-0-0	
10/01/11	vs. North Dakota	Walter Brown Arena	3:00 p.m. ET	1-5	1-1-0	0-0-0	
10/07/11	vs. Niagara	Walter Brown Arena	7:00 p.m. ET	3-1	2-1-0	0-0-0	
10/08/11	vs. Niagara	Walter Brown Arena	3:00 p.m. ET	5-2	3-1-0	0-0-0	
10/15/11	vs. Union	Walter Brown Arena	4:00 p.m. ET	6-2			
10/21/11	at Clarkson	Potsdam, N.Y.	3:00 p.m. ET	2-2			
10/22/11	at St. Lawrence	Canton, N.Y.	2:00 p.m. ET	3-2			
10/28/11	at Wisconsin	Madison, Wis.	3:00 p.m. ET	0-3			
10/29/11	at Wisconsin	Madison, Wis.	3:00 p.m. ET	1-6			
11/02/11	at Boston College *	Chestnut Hill, Mass.	7:00 p.m. ET	4-1			
11/05/11	vs. Boston College *	Walter Brown Arena	3:00 p.m. ET	1-3			
11/12/11	vs. New Hampshire *	Walter Brown Arena	3:00 p.m. ET	5-2			
11/19/11	vs. Connecticut *	Walter Brown Arena	3:00 p.m. ET	4-2			
11/20/11	at Providence *	Providence, R.I.	2:00 p.m. ET	3-2			
11/25/11	at Cornell	Ithaca, N.Y.	7:00 p.m. ET	1-3			
11/26/11	at Cornell	Ithaca, N.Y.	4:00 p.m. ET	1-7			
11/30/11	at Northeastern *	Boston, Mass.	7:00 p.m. ET	0-2			
12/03/11	at Providence *	Providence, R.I.	7:00 p.m. ET	3-4			
12/04/11	vs. Providence *	Walter Brown Arena	3:00 p.m. ET	2-1			
12/07/11	at Northeastern *	Boston, Mass.	7:00 p.m. ET	1-4			
01/08/12	at Maine *	Orono, Maine		2-1			
01/14/12	vs. Maine *	Walter Brown Arena	3:00 p.m. ET	2-3			
01/15/12	vs. Maine *	Walter Brown Arena	3:00 p.m. ET	2-5			
01/19/12	at New Hampshire *	Durham, N.H.	7:00 p.m. ET	2-4			
01/21/12	vs. Vermont *	Walter Brown Arena	3:00 p.m. ET	6-2			
01/25/12	vs. Boston College *	Walter Brown Arena	7:00 p.m. ET	6-0			
01/28/12	vs. Northeastern *	Agganis Arena	3:00 p.m. ET	3-2			
01/31/12	vs. Harvard - Beanpot First Round	Walter Brown Arena	8:00 p.m. ET	5-2			
02/04/12	at New Hampshire *	Durham, N.H.	2:00 p.m. ET	5-1			
02/07/12	Northeastern - Beanpot Final	Walter Brown Arena	5/8 p.m. ET	3-4 (OT)			
02/11/12	at Vermont *	Burlington, Vt.	2:00 p.m. ET	8-4			
02/12/12	at Vermont *	Burlington, Vt.	2:00 p.m. ET	4-1			
02/18/12	at Connecticut *	Storrs, Conn.	2:00 p.m. ET	3-2			
02/19/12	vs. Connecticut *	Walter Brown Arena	3:00 p.m. ET	2-1			

==== Conference record ====
WCHA school	Record
Boston College	2-1-0
Connecticut	2-0-0
Maine	1-2-0
New Hampshire	2-1-0
Northeastern	1-2-0
Providence	2-1-0
Vermont	2-0-0

== Postseason ==
Date	Game	Opponent	Location	Score
02-26-12	Hockey East Quarterfinal	New Hampshire	9-1	
03-03-12	Hockey East Semifinal	Boston College	5-2	
03-04-12	Hockey East Final	Providence	2-1 (2 OT)	
03-10-12	NCAA Regional	Cornell	7-8 (3 OT)	

== Awards and honors ==
- Kerrin Sperry, Hockey East Defensive Player of the Week (Week of October 3, 2011)
- Kerrin Sperry, Hockey East Defensive Player of the Week (Week of November 7, 2011)
- Kristin Sperry, BU, Co-Hockey East Player of the Week (Week of January 31, 2011)
- Kayla Tutino, Hockey East Rookie of the Week (Week of October 17, 2011)
- Kayla Tutino, Hockey East Player of the Week (Week of November 21, 2011)
- Kayla Tutino, Runner-Up, Hockey East Player of the Month (Month of November 2011)
- Kayla Tutino, Hockey East Rookie of the Week (Week of January 9, 2012)
- Kayla Tutino, Hockey East Rookie of the Week (Week of February 27, 2012)
- Jennifer Wakefield, Hockey East Player of the Week (Week of October 3, 2011)
- Jennifer Wakefield, Hockey East Player of the Month (Month of October 2011)
- Jennifer Wakefield, Hockey East Player of the Week (Week of January 23, 2012)
- Jennifer Wakefield, Hockey East Player of the Week (Week of February 27, 2012)
- Jennifer Wakefield, Hockey East Scoring Champion (2011–12)
- Boston University, Hockey East Team of the Week (Week of January 31, 2011)
- Boston University, Hockey East Team of the Week (Week of February 27, 2012)

=== Team awards ===
- Jill Cardella, co-recipient, Friends of Hockey Unsung Hero Award
- Alissa Fromkin, Academic Honors Award
- Braly Hiller, Caroline Bourdeau Spirit Award
- Shannon Mahoney, Most improved player
- Marie-Philip Poulin co-recipient, Terriers Most Valuable Player Award
- Marie-Philip Poulin, co-recipient, Strength and Conditioning Athlete of the Year
- Kerrin Sperry, co-recipient, Strength and Conditioning Athlete of the Year
- Jenn Wakefield, co-recipient, Terriers Most Valuable Player Award
- Louise Warren, co-recipient, Friends of Hockey Unsung Hero Award
