= 2011–12 Providence Friars women's ice hockey season =

- Conference: ECAC
- Home ice: Schneider Arena

Rankings
- USA Today/USA Hockey Magazine: Not ranked
- USCHO.com/CBS College Sports: Not ranked

Record

Coaches and captains
- Head coach: Bob Deraney
- Assistant coaches: Karen Thatcher

== Offseason ==
- Aug. 31, 2011: Senior goaltender Genevieve Lacasse has completed her first tournament with the Canada’s National women’s ice hockey team. She won two of three games at the 2011 IIHF 12 Nations Tournament. She let in four goals while stopping six shots in a 6-4 loss to Sweden. Earlier in the tournament, she shut out Slovakia. This marked her fourth-consecutive shutout in international competition (dating back to the 2011 MLP Cup when she played with the Canadian Under 22 team).

=== Recruiting ===
Player	Nationality	Position	Former team
Hillary Drake	United States	Goaltender	Mosinee High School
Haley Frade	United States	Forward	Tabor Academy
Beth Hanrahan	United States	Forward	National Sports Academy
Suzie Lundeen	United States	Forward/Defense	Edina High School
Allison Micheletti	United States	Forward	Rosemount High School
Brooke Simpson	United States	Forward	Lawrence Academy
Victoria Virtue	United States	Defense	Winchendon School

== Exhibition ==
Date	Opponent	Location	Time	Score
09/24/11	vs. McGill	Providence, R.I.	7:00 p.m. ET	

== Regular season ==
- The 17th Annual Mayor's Cup took place on November 25 versus the Brown Bears.
- December 22: In recognition of the ten-year anniversary of the Women's Hockey East Association, the Friars announced their Providence Hockey East All-Decade Team. Six forwards, five defenders and two goalies were honored.

Player	Position	Class of:
Jenn Butsch	Forward	2003
Ashley Payton	Forward	2006
Darlene Stephenson	Forward	2004
Karen Thatcher	Forward	2006
Sonny Watrous	Forward	2007
Rush Zimmerman	Forward	2005
Kristen Gigliotti	Defense	2007
Kelli Halcisak	Defense	2004
Erin Normore	Defense	2009
Meredith Roth	Defense	2004
Kathleen Smith	Defense	2008
Jana Bugden	Goaltender	2007
Genevieve Lacasse	Goaltender	2012

- January 10: The Dartmouth Big Green and Providence Friars played each other in an outdoor game at Fenway Park in Boston. Providence skater Brooke Simpson scored her first career NCAA goal. With 1:14 remaining in regulation, Big Green forward Camille Dumais scored the game-winning goal on Providence netminder Genevieve Lacasse as the Big Green prevailed by a 3-2 mark.
- On January 28 and 29, Lacasse stopped 51 of 53 shots in a Friars sweep of the Connecticut Huskies. With the two victories, Lacasse surpassed Jana Bugden as the Friars all-time wins leader with 59. Her shutout on January 28 was the 17th of her Friars career, a new record.

=== Standings ===
2011–12 Hockey East Association standings
	Conference							Overall					
	GP	W	L	T	PTS	GF	GA	GP	W	L	T	GF	GA
#4 Boston College	16	11	3	2	24	41	29	28	18	7	3	76	55
#7 Northeastern	16	11	3	2	24	52	23	28	17	6	3	88	42
Boston University	16	9	7	0	18	46	38	28	15	12	1	78	74
Providence	16	8	7	1	17	47	36	29	11	15	3	74	70
Maine	15	7	6	2	16	42	37	27	13	8	6	81	65
New Hampshire	15	4	9	2	10	27	51	28	10	15	3	62	100
Vermont	15	3	10	2	8	26	50	26	4	16	6	47	95
Connecticut	15	2	10	3	7	20	37	28	3	18	7	42	81
Championship: To Be Determined † indicates conference regular season champion * indicates conference tournament champion National rankings: Conference rankings: Updated February 2nd, 2012

*Rankings based on number of points in the conference

=== Schedule ===
Date	Opponent	Location	Time	Score
09/30/11	at Bemidji State	Bemidji, Minn.	7:00 p.m. ET	
10/01/11	at Bemidji State	Bemidji, Minn.	4:00 p.m. ET	
10/08/11	at Clarkson	Potsdam, N.Y.	1:00 p.m. ET	
10/09/11	at St. Lawrence	Canton, N.Y.	1:00 p.m. ET	
10/15/11	vs. Mercyhurst	Providence, R.I.	1:00 p.m. ET	
10/16/11	vs. Mercyhurst	Providence, R.I.	1:00 p.m. ET	
10/21/11	at Vermont	Burlington, Vt.	7:00 p.m. ET	
10/22/11	at Vermont	Burlington, Vt.	4:00 p.m. ET	
10/28/11	vs. Boston College	Providence, R.I.	7:00 p.m. ET	
11/01/11	vs. Yale	Providence, R.I.	7:00 p.m. ET	
11/05/11	vs. Maine	Providence, R.I.	1:00 p.m. ET	
11/06/11	vs. Maine	Providence, R.I.	2:00 p.m. ET	
11/12/11	at Connecticut	Storrs, Conn.	1:00 p.m. ET	
11/13/11	vs. New Hampshire	Providence, R.I.	2:00 p.m. ET	
11/19/11	vs. Vermont	Providence, R.I.	2:00 p.m. ET	
11/20/11	vs. Boston University	Providence, R.I.	2:00 p.m. ET	
11/25/11	vs. Brown	Providence, R.I.	7:00 p.m. ET	
11/27/11	at Union	Schenectady, N.Y.	2:00 p.m. ET	
12/03/11	vs. Boston University	Providence, R.I.	7:00 p.m. ET	
12/04/11	at Boston University	Boston, Mass.	3:00 p.m. ET	
12/10/11	vs. Harvard	Providence, R.I.	1:00 p.m. ET	
12/31/11	vs. Dartmouth	Providence, R.I.	2:00 p.m. ET	
01/06/12	vs. Robert Morris	Providence, R.I.	7:00 p.m. ET	
01/07/12	vs. Robert Morris	Providence, R.I.	1:00 p.m. ET	
01/15/12	vs. Northeastern	The Bog, Kingston Mass.	4:00 p.m. ET	
01/20/12	at Boston College	Chestnut, Hill, Mass.	7:00 p.m. ET	
01/22/12	at Maine	Orono, Maine	3:00 p.m. ET	
01/28/12	vs. Connecticut	Providence, R.I.	2:00 p.m. ET	
01/29/12	at Connecticut	Storrs, Conn.	2:00 p.m. ET	
02/04/12	at Boston College	Chestnut, Hill, Mass.	2:00 p.m. ET	
02/11/12	at New Hampshire	Durham, N.H.	2:00 p.m. ET	
02/12/12	at New Hampshire	Durham, N.H.	2:00 p.m. ET	
02/17/12	vs. Northeastern	Providence, R.I.	7:00 p.m. ET	
02/19/12	at Northeastern	Boston, Mass.	4:00 p.m. ET	

== Awards and honors ==
- Nicole Anderson, Hockey East Co-Player of the Week (Week of November 28, 2011)
- Beth Hanrahan, Hockey East Co-Rookie of the Week (Week of October 24, 2011)
- Genevieve Lacasse, Hockey East Defensive Player of the Week (Week of January 31, 2011)
- Nina Riley, Hockey East Defensive Player of the Week (Week of January 9. 2012)
- Laura Verahanta, Hockey East Player of the Week (Week of November 7, 2011)
