= 2011–12 New Hampshire Wildcats women's ice hockey season =

Women's ice hockey competition

- Conference: Hockey East

Record

Coaches and captains
- Head coach: Brian McCloskey
- Assistant coaches: Stephanie Jones; Jamie Wood
- Captain(s): Katie Brock, Kailey Chappell, Nicole Gifford

== Offseason ==
=== Recruiting ===
Player	Nationality	Position	Former team
Brynja Bogan	United States	Defense	Participated with the Washington Pride
Casey Stathopoulos	United States	Forward	Competed for the Massachusetts Spitfires
Heather Kashman	Canada	Forward	Won silver medal at 2011 Esso Cup with the Edmonton Thunder
Jenna Lascelle	Canada	Forward	Participated at Ontario Hockey Academy
Jess Ryan	Canada	Defense	From Cloquet, Minnesota
Caroline Broderick	United States	Forward	Participated at Ontario Hockey Academy
Kayla Mork	United States	Defense	From Victoria, Minnesota
Moe Bradley	United States	Goaltender	Competed with the Boston Blades of the CWHL
Jenn Gilligan	Canada	Goaltender	Played with the Kitchener-Waterloo Rangers of the PWHL

== Exhibition ==
Date	Opponent	Time	Score	Goal scorers
Sat Sep. 24	Ontario Hockey Academy	2:00 PM	6-1	Hannah Armstrong, Katie Kleinendorst, Maggie Hunt, Emma Clark, Heather Kashman, Nicole Gifford

== Regular season ==
=== News and notes ===
- September 30: Heather Kashman scored her first career goal in her NCAA debut as New Hampshire bested the Niagara Purple Eagles. The six goals scored by New Hampshire marked the highest goal scoring output since Oct. 18, 2009 (also against Niagara in a 6-1 victory). It was also the highest number of goals scored by the squad in a road game since Feb. 8, 2009 at Vermont (6-2 win).
- November 18: Minnesota skater Amanda Kessel registered 5 points as the Golden Gophers defeated the Wildcats by an 11-0 tally. New Hampshire starting goalie Jenn Gilligan made 27 saves but allowed eight goals in two periods. She was replaced by Moe Bradley in the third period. Bradley stopped 11 of 14 shots as the Wildcats suffered their worst loss in the 35 year history of the program.
- November 26: Nicole Gifford scored the first hat trick of her career as the Wildcats defeated the Princeton Tigers by a 3-1 mark. The Wildcats improved to 38-5-2 lifetime against Princeton.
- January 28: Kristina Lavoie scored her first career hat trick in a 4-2 victory over Vermont.

=== Standings ===
2011–12 Hockey East Association standings
	Conference							Overall					
	GP	W	L	T	PTS	GF	GA	GP	W	L	T	GF	GA
#4 Boston College	16	11	3	2	24	41	29	28	18	7	3	76	55
#7 Northeastern	16	11	3	2	24	52	23	28	17	6	3	88	42
Boston University	16	9	7	0	18	46	38	28	15	12	1	78	74
Providence	16	8	7	1	17	47	36	29	11	15	3	74	70
Maine	15	7	6	2	16	42	37	27	13	8	6	81	65
New Hampshire	15	4	9	2	10	27	51	28	10	15	3	62	100
Vermont	15	3	10	2	8	26	50	26	4	16	6	47	95
Connecticut	15	2	10	3	7	20	37	28	3	18	7	42	81
Championship: To Be Determined † indicates conference regular season champion * indicates conference tournament champion National rankings: Conference rankings: Updated February 2nd, 2012

*Rankings based on number of points in the conference

=== Schedule ===
Date	Opponent	Time	Score	Record
Fri Sep. 30	at Niagara	7:00 PM	6-4	1-0-0
Sat Oct. 1	at Niagara	1:00 PM	3-2	2-0-0
Fri Oct. 7	Colgate	7:00 PM	3-0	
Sat Oct. 8	Syracuse	5:00 PM	1-2	
Fri Oct. 14	Boston College *	7:00 PM	1-1	
Sat Oct. 15	at Boston College *	2:00 PM	0-5	
Fri Oct. 21	at St. Lawrence	4:00 PM	2-2	
Sat Oct. 22	at Clarkson	2:00 PM	1-2	
Thu Nov. 3	Vermont *	7:00 PM	1-4	
Sun Nov. 6	at Dartmouth	1:00 PM	5-4 (OT)	
Sat Nov. 12	at Boston U. *	3:00 PM	2-5	
Sun Nov. 13	at Providence *	2:00 PM	2-6	
Fri Nov. 18	at Minnesota	8:00 PM	0-11	
Sat Nov. 19	at Minnesota	5:00 PM	1-6	
Fri Nov. 25	Maine *	7:00 PM	0-3	
Sat Nov. 26	Princeton	2:00 PM	3-1	
Tue Nov. 29	Union	7:00 PM		
Sat Dec. 3	Northeastern *	2:00 PM		
Sun Dec. 4	at Northeastern *	2:00 PM		
Fri Dec. 9	at Harvard	7:00 PM		
Sun Dec. 11	Dartmouth	2:00 PM		
Tue Jan. 10	at Boston College *	7:00 PM		
Fri Jan. 13	Connecticut *	7:00 PM		
Sat Jan. 14	Connecticut *	4:00 PM		
Thu Jan. 19	Boston U. *	7:00 PM		
Sat Jan. 21	at Northeastern *	2:00 PM		
Sat Jan. 28	Vermont *	2:00 PM		
Sun Jan. 29	at Vermont *	2:00 PM		
Sat Feb. 4	Boston U. *	2:00 PM		
Sun Feb. 5	at Connecticut *	2:00 PM		
Sat Feb. 11	Providence *	2:00 PM		
Sun Feb. 12	Providence *	2:00 PM		
Sat Feb. 18	at Maine *			
Sun Feb. 19	at Maine *	3:00 PM		

== Awards and honors ==
- Heather Kashman, Hockey East Rookie of the Week (Week of October 3, 2011)
- Kristina Lavoie, Hockey East Player of the Week (Week of January 16. 2012)
- Kristina Lavoie, New Hampshire, Co-Hockey East Player of the Week (Week of January 31, 2011)
- New Hampshire Wildcats, Hockey East Team of the Week (Week of October 3, 2011)
