= 2011–12 Vermont Catamounts women's ice hockey season =

- Conference: Hockey East
- Home ice: Gutterson Fieldhouse

Rankings
- USA Today/USA Hockey Magazine: Not ranked
- USCHO.com/CBS College Sports: Not ranked

Record

Coaches and captains
- Head coach: Tim Bothwell

The 2011–12 Vermont Catamounts season was their seventh in Hockey East. Led by head coach Tim Bothwell, the Catamounts will attempt to qualify for the NCAA hockey tournament.

== Offseason ==
=== Recruiting ===
Player	Position	Nationality	Shoots	Height	Former team
Greer Vogl	Defense	United States	Left	5-6	Edina High School
Gina Repaci	Defense	Canada	Left	5-8	Mississauga Jr. Chiefs
Meghan Huertas	Forward	United States	Left	5-6	North American Hockey Academy
Delia McNally	Defense	United States	Right	5-11	Berkshire School
Brittany Zuback	Forward	Canada	Left	5-6	Kitchener-Waterloo Rangers
Amanda Pelkey	Forward	United States	Right	5-3	North American Hockey Academy
Krystal Baumann	Forward	United States	Left	5-5	Farmington High School
Megan Bergland	Forward	United States	Right	5-6	Faribault High School
Kaitlyn LaGue	Goaltender	United States	Left	5-5	National Sports Academy
Klara Myren	Forward	Sweden	Right	5-8	Leksands IF; Competed for Sweden in 2010 Vancouver Winter Games

== Exhibition ==
Date	Opponent	Location	Time	Score
10/1/2011	McGill	Burlington, Vt.	4:00 pm	

== Regular season ==
- November 3: The Vermont Catamounts won their first ever game at New Hampshire by a 4-1 tally at the Whittemore Center. Catamounts goalie Roxanne Douville made 33 saves, while freshman Amanda Pelkey notched a goal and an assist.
- January 28 and 29: Amanda Pelkey had two goals and one assist as Vermont split a home and home series on versus New Hampshire. She had a total of ten shots on goal.

=== Standings ===
2011–12 Hockey East Association standings
	Conference							Overall					
	GP	W	L	T	PTS	GF	GA	GP	W	L	T	GF	GA
#4 Boston College	16	11	3	2	24	41	29	28	18	7	3	76	55
#7 Northeastern	16	11	3	2	24	52	23	28	17	6	3	88	42
Boston University	16	9	7	0	18	46	38	28	15	12	1	78	74
Providence	16	8	7	1	17	47	36	29	11	15	3	74	70
Maine	15	7	6	2	16	42	37	27	13	8	6	81	65
New Hampshire	15	4	9	2	10	27	51	28	10	15	3	62	100
Vermont	15	3	10	2	8	26	50	26	4	16	6	47	95
Connecticut	15	2	10	3	7	20	37	28	3	18	7	42	81
Championship: To Be Determined † indicates conference regular season champion * indicates conference tournament champion National rankings: Conference rankings: Updated February 2nd, 2012

*Rankings based on number of points in the conference

=== Schedule ===
Date	Opponent	Location	Time	Score
9/30/2011	Clarkson	Burlington, Vt.	3:00 pm	
10/7/2011	Rensselaer Polytechnic Institute	Burlington, Vt.	7:00 pm	
10/8/2011	Rensselaer Polytechnic Institute	Burlington, Vt.	4:00 pm	
10/15/2011	North Dakota	Grand Forks, N.D	3:00 pm	
10/16/2011	North Dakota	Grand Forks, N.D.	3:00 pm	
10/21/2011	* Providence	Burlington, Vt.	7:00 pm	
10/22/2011	* Providence	Burlington, Vt.	4:00 pm	
10/28/2011	Niagara University	Burlington, Vt.	2:00 pm	
10/29/2011	Niagara University	Burlington, Vt.	2:00 pm	
11/3/2011	* New Hampshire	Durham, N.H.	7:00 pm	4-1
11/11/2011	* Northeastern	Burlington, Vt.	7:00 pm	
11/12/2011	* Northeastern	Burlington, Vt.	2:00 pm	
11/19/2011	* Providence	Providence, R.I.	2:00 pm	
11/20/2011	* Connecticut	Storrs, Conn.	2:00 pm	
11/23/2011	* Maine	Burlington, Vt	2:00 pm	
11/26/2011	Colgate University	Hamilton, N.Y.	2:00 pm	
11/27/2011	Colgate University	Hamilton, N.Y.	2:00 pm	
12/3/2011	* Connecticut	Burlington, Vt.	2:00 pm	
12/4/2011	* Connecticut	Burlington, Vt.	2:00 pm	
1/3/2012	Dartmouth	Hanover, N.H.	7:00 pm	
1/10/2012	St. Lawrence	Canton, N.Y.	7:00 pm	
1/14/2012	* Boston College	Burlington, Vt.	7:00 pm	
1/21/2012	* Boston U	Boston, Mass.	3:00 pm	
1/22/2012	* Northeastern	Boston, Mass.	2:00 pm	
1/28/2012	* New Hampshire	Durham, N.H.	2:00 pm	
1/29/2012	* New Hampshire	Burlington, Vt.	2:00 pm	
2/4/2012	* Maine	Orono, Maine	2:00 pm	
2/5/2012	* Maine	Orono, Maine	3:00 pm	
2/11/2012	* Boston U	Burlington, Vt.	2:00 pm	
2/12/2012	* Boston U	Burlington, Vt.	2:00 pm	
2/17/2012	* Boston College	Chestnut Hill, Mass.	2:00 pm	
2/18/2012	* Boston College	Chestnut Hill, Mass.	2:00 pm	

== Awards and honors ==
- Amanda Pelkey, Hockey East Rookie of the Week (Week of November 7, 2011)
- Amanda Pelkey, Vermont, Hockey East Rookie of the Week (Week of January 31, 2011)
