= 2011–12 Connecticut Huskies women's ice hockey season =

- Conference: ECAC
- Home ice: Mark Edward Freitas Ice Forum

Rankings
- USA Today/USA Hockey Magazine: Not ranked
- USCHO.com/CBS College Sports: Not ranked

Record

Coaches and captains
- Head coach: Heather Linstad

The Connecticut Huskies women's ice hockey team represented the University of Connecticut in the 2011–12 NCAA Division I women's ice hockey season.

== Offseason ==
- June 9: Huskies head coach Heather Linstad was appointed head coach of the U.S. Women's National Under-18 Team. She will be assisted by Huskies assistant coach Hilary Witt and Minnesota assistant Joel Johnson. Linstad will participate at the USA Hockey Women's National Festival from August 10 to 17. In addition, she will participate in a three-game series versus Canada in Rockland, Ontario (from Aug. 18-21). Her final involvement would involve the 2012 International Ice Hockey Federation World Women's U18 Championship in early January.

=== Recruiting ===
Player	Nationality	Position	Former team
Christie Brauer	Forward	United States	
Kayla Campero	Forward	United States	
Rachel Farrel	Forward	United States	
Caitlin Hewes	Defense	United States	
Sarah MacDonnell	Forward	Canada	
Silvana Moccia	Goaltender	United States	
Emily Snodgrass	Forward	United States	

== Exhibition ==
Date	Opponent	Location	Time	Score
09/23/11	vs. McGill	Storrs, Conn.	7:00 p.m. ET	2-2

== Regular season ==
The Huskies willplay in the Nutmeg Classic on November 25 and 26.

- Nov. 19: Emily Snodgrass scored her first career multi goal game in a 4-2 loss to the Boston College Eagles. With the win, the Huskies snapped a 12-period streak without scoring a goal. The loss tied a program record with six straight losses, dating back to the Huskies first season in 2000-'01.
- November 20: The Huskies snapped a six game losing streak with a 3-0 win over Vermont. Goaltender Nicole Paniccia earned her second shutout of the season.
- January 29: The Huskies participated in the annual Hockey East Skating Strides game at the Freitas Ice Forum. Against the Providence Friars, the Huskies were defeated by a 5-2 mark. With the loss, the Huskies fell to 3-18-7 overall. The Huskies ended up being swept in the season series. In a pre-game ceremony, UConn presented Hockey East Associate Commissioner Kathy Winters with a donation of $10,000, representing the Friends of Mel Foundation. Of note, the Huskies set a program-record for funds raised in the Skating Strides event.
- February 11: Before the match against the Eagles, Connecticut announced the Connecticut Hockey East All-Decade Team (in commemoration of Hockey East’s 10th Anniversary). The forwards named included: Jennifer Chaisson, Jaclyn Hawkins and Tiffany Owens. The honored defenders included Cristin Allen and Natalie Vibert. Goalie Kaitlyn Shain was named All-Decade goaltender.

=== Standings ===
2011–12 Hockey East Association standings
	Conference							Overall					
	GP	W	L	T	PTS	GF	GA	GP	W	L	T	GF	GA
#4 Boston College	16	11	3	2	24	41	29	28	18	7	3	76	55
#7 Northeastern	16	11	3	2	24	52	23	28	17	6	3	88	42
Boston University	16	9	7	0	18	46	38	28	15	12	1	78	74
Providence	16	8	7	1	17	47	36	29	11	15	3	74	70
Maine	15	7	6	2	16	42	37	27	13	8	6	81	65
New Hampshire	15	4	9	2	10	27	51	28	10	15	3	62	100
Vermont	15	3	10	2	8	26	50	26	4	16	6	47	95
Connecticut	15	2	10	3	7	20	37	28	3	18	7	42	81
Championship: To Be Determined † indicates conference regular season champion * indicates conference tournament champion National rankings: Conference rankings: Updated February 2nd, 2012

*Rankings based on number of points in the conference

=== Schedule ===
Date	Opponent	Location	Time	Score
09/30/11	vs. RPI	Storrs, Conn.	7:00 p.m. ET	3-3
10/01/11	vs. RPI	Storrs, Conn.	3:00 p.m. ET	0-1
10/08/11	at St. Lawrence	Canton, N.Y.	1:00 p.m. ET	1-4
10/09/11	at Clarkson	Potsdam, N.Y.	1:00 p.m. ET	
10/14/11	vs. Minnesota Duluth	Storrs, Conn.	7:00 p.m. ET	
10/15/11	vs. Minnesota Duluth	Storrs, Conn.	4:00 p.m. ET	
10/21/11	vs. Maine	Storrs, Conn.	7:00 p.m. ET	
10/22/11	vs. Maine	Storrs, Conn.	2:00 p.m. ET	
10/28/11	at Syracuse	Syracuse, N.Y.	7:00 p.m. ET	
10/29/11	at Syracuse	Syracuse, N.Y.	4:00 p.m. ET	
11/04/11	at Northeastern	Boston, Mass.	7:00 p.m. ET	
11/05/11	vs. Northeastern	Storrs, Conn.	4:00 p.m. ET	
11/12/11	vs. Providence	Storrs, Conn.	1:00 p.m. ET	
11/19/11	at Boston University	Boston, Mass.	3:00 p.m. ET	
11/20/11	vs. Vermont	Storrs, Conn.	2:00 p.m. ET	
11/25/11	vs. Quinnipiac (Nutmeg Classic)	Storrs, Conn.	4:00 p.m. ET	2-4
11/26/11	vs. Yale (Nutmeg Classic Consolation Game)	Storrs, Conn.	4:00 p.m. ET	
12/03/11	at Vermont	Burlington, Vt.	2:00 p.m. ET	
12/04/11	at Vermont	Burlington, Vt.	2:00 p.m. ET	
01/03/12	vs. Harvard	Storrs, Conn.	7:00 p.m. ET	
01/07/12	vs. Brown	Storrs, Conn.	1:00 p.m. ET	
01/10/12	vs. Union	Storrs, Conn.	7:00 p.m. ET	
01/13/12	at New Hampshire	Durham, N.H.	7:00 p.m. ET	
01/14/12	at New Hampshire	Durham, N.H.	4:00 p.m. ET	
01/20/12	at Maine	Orono, Maine	2:00 p.m. ET	
01/22/12	vs. Boston College	Storrs, Conn.	2:00 p.m. ET	
01/28/12	at Providence	Providence, R.I.	2:00 p.m. ET	
01/29/12	vs. Providence	Storrs, Conn.	2:00 p.m. ET	
02/04/12	at Northeastern	Boston, Mass.	2:00 p.m. ET	
02/05/12	vs. New Hampshire	Storrs, Conn.	2:00 p.m. ET	
02/11/12	vs. Boston College	Storrs, Conn.	1:00 p.m. ET	
02/12/12	at Boston College	Boston, Mass. 2:00 p.m. ET		
02/18/12	vs. Boston University	Storrs, Conn.	2:00 p.m. ET	
02/19/12	at Boston University	Boston, Mass.	3:00 p.m. ET	

== Awards and honors ==
- Nicole Paniccia, Hockey East Defensive Player of the Week (Week of October 24, 2011)
- Emily Snodgrass, Hockey East Rookie of the Week (Week of November 21, 2011)

=== Hockey East 10th Anniversary Team ===
- Cristin Allen, selection
- Jaclyn Hawkins, Honorable Mention
