= 2011–12 Boston College Eagles women's ice hockey season =

- Conference: Hockey East

Record

Coaches and captains
- Head coach: Katie King

The Boston College Eagles women's hockey team represented Boston College in the 2011–12 NCAA Division I women's ice hockey season. The Terriers were coached by Katie King.

== Offseason ==
- August 9: Eight current and former Eagles players were invited to the 2011 USA Hockey Women's National Festival in Blaine, Minnesota (from August 10–20). The players include Allie Thunstrom, Molly Schaus, Kelli Stack, Blake Bolden, Mary Restuccia, Taylor Wasylk, Alex Carpenter, and Megan Miller.
- Sept. 20: Boston College was ranked No. 5 on the USCHO.com Division I Women's preseason poll. This is the highest preseason ranking in Eagles history. In addition, the top 10 ranking marks the sixth time in seven seasons that the Eagles have been ranked in the USCHO.com preseason poll.

== Recruiting ==
| Player | Position | Nationality | Notes |
| Alex Carpenter | Forward | United States | Daughter of former NHL player Bobby Carpenter |
| Emily Field | Forward | United States | Played at the Lawrence Academy |
| Erin Kickham | Forward | United States | Played at Tabor Academy |
| Megan Miller | Goaltender | United States | She was a 2011 Team USA U-18 World Championship team member. In addition, she led the Chicago Mission to four straight Illinois state championships |
| Emily Pfalzer | Defense | United States | Played for Mississauga Jr. Chiefs of PWHL |

== Exhibition ==
| Date | Opponent | Location | Time | Score | Goal scorers |
| 09/25/11 | vs. McGill | Providence, R.I. | 3:00 p.m. | | |

== Regular season ==
- Jan. 5-6: Mary Restuccia had a hand in all four Boston College goals. In the first game, she assisted on the Eagles lone goal in a 2-1 loss to St. Lawrence. The following day, Restuccia assisted on all three Boston College goals, as the Eagles defeated Clarkson by a 3-2 score.

=== Standings ===
2011–12 Hockey East Association standings
| | Conference | | | | | | | Overall | | | | | |
| | GP | W | L | T | PTS | GF | GA | GP | W | L | T | GF | GA |
|---|---|---|---|---|---|---|---|---|---|---|---|---|---|
| #4 Boston College | 16 | 11 | 3 | 2 | 24 | 41 | 29 | 28 | 18 | 7 | 3 | 76 | 55 |
| #7 Northeastern | 16 | 11 | 3 | 2 | 24 | 52 | 23 | 28 | 17 | 6 | 3 | 88 | 42 |
| Boston University | 16 | 9 | 7 | 0 | 18 | 46 | 38 | 28 | 15 | 12 | 1 | 78 | 74 |
| Providence | 16 | 8 | 7 | 1 | 17 | 47 | 36 | 29 | 11 | 15 | 3 | 74 | 70 |
| Maine | 15 | 7 | 6 | 2 | 16 | 42 | 37 | 27 | 13 | 8 | 6 | 81 | 65 |
| New Hampshire | 15 | 4 | 9 | 2 | 10 | 27 | 51 | 28 | 10 | 15 | 3 | 62 | 100 |
| Vermont | 15 | 3 | 10 | 2 | 8 | 26 | 50 | 26 | 4 | 16 | 6 | 47 | 95 |
| Connecticut | 15 | 2 | 10 | 3 | 7 | 20 | 37 | 28 | 3 | 18 | 7 | 42 | 81 |
Championship: To Be Determined † indicates conference regular season champion * indicates conference tournament champion National rankings: Conference rankings: Updated February 2nd, 2012

*Rankings based on number of points in the conference

=== Schedule ===
| Date | Opponent | Location | Time | Score | Record | Conference Record | Goal scorers |
| 10/08/11 | at Minnesota-Duluth | Duluth, Minn. | 4:00 p.m. | | | | |
| 10/09/11 | at Minnesota-Duluth | Duluth, Minn. | 4:00 p.m. | | | | |
| 10/14/11 | at New Hampshire | Durham, N.H. | 7:00 p.m. | | | | |
| 10/15/11 | vs. New Hampshire | Chestnut Hill, Mass. | 2:00 p.m. | | | | |
| 10/21/11 | vs. Quinnipiac | Chestnut Hill, Mass. | 2:00 p.m. | | | | |
| 10/23/11 | vs. Dartmouth | Chestnut Hill, Mass. | 2:00 p.m. | | | | |
| 10/28/11 | at Providence | Providence, R.I. | 7:00 p.m. | | | | |
| 10/30/11 | vs. Maine | Chestnut Hill, Mass. | 2:00 p.m. | | | | |
| 11/02/11 | vs. Boston University * | Chestnut Hill, Mass. | 7:00 p.m. ET | | | | |
| 11/05/11 | at Boston University * | Walter Brown Arena | 3:00 p.m. ET | | | | |
| 11/17/11 | at Northeastern | Boston | 7:00 p.m. | | | | |
| 11/18/11 | vs. Northeastern | Chestnut Hill, Mass. | 7:00 p.m. | | | | |
| 11/22/11 | at Quinnipiac | Hampden, Conn. | 7:00 p.m. | | | | |
| 11/25/11 | vs. Princeton | Chestnut Hill, Mass. | 3:00 p.m. | | | | |
| 11/27/11 | at Brown | Providence, R.I. | | | | | |
| 12/03/11 | at Maine | Orono, Maine | 7:00 p.m. | | | | |
| 12/04/11 | at Maine | Orono, Maine | 3:00 p.m. | | | | |
| 12/09/11 | vs. Mercyhurst | Chestnut Hill, Mass. | 7:00 p.m. | | | | |
| 12/10/11 | vs. Mercyhurst | Chestnut Hill, Mass. | 2:00 p.m. | | | | |
| 01/05/12 | vs. St. Lawrence | Boston (Northeastern) | 7:00 p.m. | | | | |
| 01/06/12 | vs. Clarkson | Chestnut Hill, Mass. | 3:00 p.m. | | | | |
| 01/10/12 | vs. New Hampshire | Chestnut Hill, Mass. | 7:00 p.m. | | | | |
| 01/14/12 | at Vermont | Burlington, Vt. | 7:00 p.m. | | | | |
| 01/17/12 | vs. Northeastern | Chestnut Hill, Mass. | 7:00 p.m. | | | | |
| 01/20/12 | vs. Providence | Chestnut Hill, Mass. | 7:00 p.m. | | | | |
| 01/22/12 | at Connecticut | Storrs, Conn. | 2:00 p.m. | | | | |
| 01/25/12 | at Boston University * | Walter Brown Arena | 7:00 p.m. ET | | | | |
| 01/31/12 | vs. Northeastern | Boston (BU) | 5:00 p.m. | | | | |
| 02/07/12 | Beanpot Consolation | Boston (BU) | | | | | |
| 02/04/12 | vs. Providence | Chestnut Hill, Mass. | 2:00 p.m. | | | | |
| 02/11/12 | at Connecticut | Storrs, Conn. 1:00 p.m. | | | | | |
| 02/12/12 | vs. Connecticut | Chestnut Hill, Mass. | 2:00 p.m. | | | | |
| 02/17/12 | vs. Vermont | Chestnut Hill, Mass. | 2:00 p.m. | | | | |
| 02/18/12 | vs. Vermont | Chestnut Hill, Mass. | 2:00 p.m. | | | | |

== Awards and honors ==
- Corinne Boyles, Hockey East Rookie of the Week (Week of November 21, 2011)
- Corinne Boyles, Hockey East Goaltender of the Month (Month of December 2011)
- Dru Burns, Hockey East Co-Player of the Week (Week of November 28, 2011)
- Alex Carpenter, Hockey East Rookie of the Month (Month of October 2011)
- Alex Carpenter, Hockey East Rookie of the Month (Month of December 2011)
- Emily Field, Hockey East Player of the Week (Week of October 24, 2011)
- Mary Restuccia, Hockey East Player of the Week (Week of January 9. 2012)
- Hockey East Team of the Week (Week of October 24, 2011)
- Hockey East Team of the Week (Week of November 21, 2011)
