= 2011–12 Maine Black Bears women's ice hockey season =

- Conference: Hockey East
- Home ice: Alfond Arena

Rankings
- USA Today/USA Hockey Magazine: Not ranked
- USCHO.com/CBS College Sports: Not ranked

Record

Coaches and captains
- Head coach: Maria Lewis
- Captain: Dawn Sullivan
- Alternate captain: Ashley Norum

Head coach Maria Lewis returned for her second season. Lewis led the Maine Black Bears to the Hockey East Tournament in the previous season and helped the Black Bears double their win total from the previous season. The Black Bears returned 14 letterwinners for the season (nine forwards, three defenders, two goaltenders). Dawn Sullivan served as the Black Bears captain. In the past season, she registered eight goals and nine assists for 17 points.

== Offseason ==
- Sept 20/11: The Hockey East Preseason coaches poll was released and the Black Bears were selected to finish in eighth place. The team received 18 points in the poll overall.

=== Recruiting ===
Player	Position	Height	Nationality	Hometown	Former team
Megan Menotti	Defense	5-4	United States	Vernon Hills, IL	Chicago Misson
Brittney Hunneke	Defense	5-7	United States	Hastings, MN	Hastings High School
Jessica Hall	Defense	5-6	Canada	Ingersoll, ON	KW Rangers
Tori Pasquariello	Forward	5-7	Canada	Mississauga, ON	Brampton Thunder
Jennifer More	Forward	5-3	Canada	Deloraine, MB	Notre Dame
Katy Massey	Forward	5-1	United States	Waterville, ME	Waterville High School Varsity Boys
Nikola Tomigova	Forward	5-6	Czech Republic	Smrzice, Czech Republic	Wyoming Seminary
Meghann Treacy	Goaltender	5-9	United States	Peekskill, NY	Williston Northampton

== Regular season ==
- January 22: Maine hosted Providence College for the Sixth Annual Hockey East Skating Strides Against Breast Cancer event. The Black Bears bested the Friars in an overtime finish by a 3-2 mark. Maine improved to 13-8-6 on the season and 7-6-2 in Hockey East play. Maine goals were scored by Brianne Kilgour, Brittany Dougherty and Danielle Ward. Mary Dempsey from the Patrick Dempsey Cancer Center participated in the ceremonial puck drop. Commemorative game jerseys with pink color were auctioned off after the game. In addition, the team participated in an autograph session in which all fans received a signed team photo.
- February 4–5: Maine enjoyed a series sweep versus the Vermont Catamounts. Brittany Dougherty accumulated a total of three points (two goals and an assist), while Dawn Sullivan earned an assist in the February 4 contest (a 4-1 win), and scored the game-winning goal the following day. Other skaters with notable performances included Danielle Ward scoring a goal on February 4, and earning two assists on February 5 (a 3-0 win), while Tori Pasquariello, scored two goals in the 4-1 win. Goaltender Brittany Ott made a total of 43 saves in the sweep.
- Versus the Northeastern Huskies on February 11, 2012, Brittany Ott notched the 2,000th career save of her NCAA career.

=== Standings ===
2011–12 Hockey East Association standings
	Conference							Overall					
	GP	W	L	T	PTS	GF	GA	GP	W	L	T	GF	GA
#4 Boston College	16	11	3	2	24	41	29	28	18	7	3	76	55
#7 Northeastern	16	11	3	2	24	52	23	28	17	6	3	88	42
Boston University	16	9	7	0	18	46	38	28	15	12	1	78	74
Providence	16	8	7	1	17	47	36	29	11	15	3	74	70
Maine	15	7	6	2	16	42	37	27	13	8	6	81	65
New Hampshire	15	4	9	2	10	27	51	28	10	15	3	62	100
Vermont	15	3	10	2	8	26	50	26	4	16	6	47	95
Connecticut	15	2	10	3	7	20	37	28	3	18	7	42	81
Championship: To Be Determined † indicates conference regular season champion * indicates conference tournament champion National rankings: Conference rankings: Updated February 2nd, 2012

*Rankings based on number of points in the conference

=== Schedule ===
Date	Opponent	Time	Score	Record
Sep. 23	Sacred Heart	7:00 PM		
Sep. 24	Sacred Heart	3:00 PM		
Oct. 7	at Quinnipiac	7:00 PM		
Oct. 8	at Quinnipiac	1:00 PM		
Oct. 14	Bemidji St.	7:00 PM		
Oct. 15	Bemidji St.	5:00 PM		
Oct. 21	at Connecticut	7:00 PM		
Oct. 22	at Connecticut	2:00 PM		
Oct. 28	Northeastern	2:00 PM		
Oct. 30	at Boston College	TBA		
Nov. 5	at Providence	1:00 PM		
Nov. 6	at Providence	2:00 PM		
Nov. 12	Niagara	2:00 PM		
Nov. 13	Niagara	12:00 PM		
Nov. 18	Brown	7:00 PM		
Nov. 19	Brown	3:00 PM		
Nov. 23	at Vermont	2:00 PM		
Nov. 25	at New Hampshire	7:00 PM		
Dec. 3	Boston College	7:00 PM		
Dec. 4	Boston College	3:00 PM		
Dec. 9	at Union	7:00 PM		
Dec. 10	at Union	2:00 PM		
Jan. 8	Boston U.	3:00 PM		
Jan. 14	at Boston U.	3:00 PM		
Jan. 15	at Boston U.	3:00 PM		
Jan. 20	Connecticut	2:00 PM		
Jan. 22	Providence	3:00 PM		
Feb. 4	Vermont	2:00 PM	4-1	
Feb. 5	Vermont	3:00 PM	3-0	
Feb. 11	at Northeastern	2:00 PM		
Feb. 12	at Northeastern	2:00 PM		
Feb. 18	New Hampshire			
Feb. 19	New Hampshire	3:00 PM		

== Hockey East tournament ==
Round	Date	Opponent	Arena	Final score	Notes
Quarterfinals	Feb. 25	No. 5 Maine at No. 4 Providence College	Schneider Arena, Providence, R.I.		

== Awards and honors ==
- Melissa Gagnon, Hockey East Defensive Player of the Week (Week of September 26, 2011)
- Jennifer More, Hockey East Rookie of the Week (Week of September 26, 2011)
- Jennifer More, Hockey East Rookie of the Week (Week of January 16. 2012)
- Ashley Norum, Nominee, 2012 Hockey Humanitarian Award
- Brittany Ott, Hockey East Goaltender of the Week (Week of November 28, 2011)
- Brittany Ott, Hockey East Goaltender of the Week (Week of January 16. 2012)
- Brittany Ott, Hockey East Co-Defensive Player of the Week (Week of January 23, 2012)
- Danielle Ward, Hockey East Player of the Week (Week of September 26, 2011)
- Maine Black Bears, Hockey East Team of the Week (Week of September 26, 2011)
- Maine Black Bears, Hockey East Team of the Week (Week of November 28, 2011)
- Maine Black Bears, Hockey East Team of the Week (Week of January 16. 2012)
