= Kendall Coyne Schofield =

American ice hockey player (born 1992)

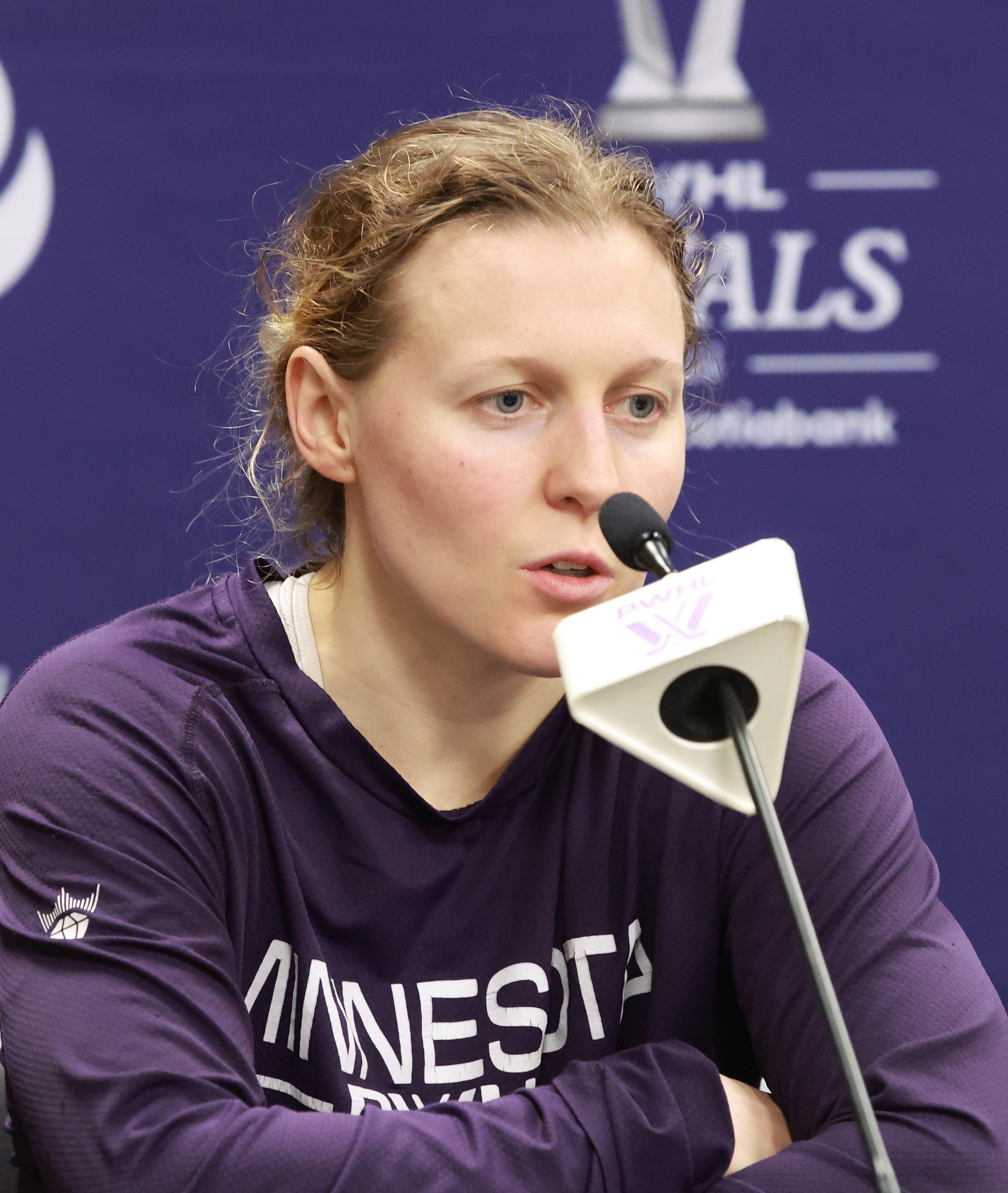
- Coyne Schofield with PWHL Minnesota in 2024
- Born: May 25, 1992 (age 34) Palos Heights, Illinois U.S.
- Height: 5 ft 2 in (157 cm)
- Weight: 125 lb (57 kg; 8 st 13 lb)
- Position: Forward
- Shoots: Left
- PWHL team Former teams: Minnesota Frost; Minnesota Whitecaps
- National team: United States
- Playing career: 2007–present
Medal record
Olympic Games
Gold medal – first place	2018 Pyeongchang	Team
Gold medal – first place	2026 Milano Cortina	Team
Silver medal – second place	2014 Sochi	Team
Silver medal – second place	2022 Beijing	Team
World Championships
Gold medal – first place	2011 Switzerland
Gold medal – first place	2013 Canada
Gold medal – first place	2015 Sweden
Gold medal – first place	2016 Canada
Gold medal – first place	2017 United States
Gold medal – first place	2019 Finland
Gold medal – first place	2025 Czechia
Silver medal – second place	2012 United States
Silver medal – second place	2021 Canada
Silver medal – second place	2022 Denmark
Silver medal – second place	2024 United States
World U18 Championships
Gold medal – first place	2008 Canada
Gold medal – first place	2009 Germany
Silver medal – second place	2010 United States

Kendall Coyne Schofield (born May 25, 1992) is an American professional ice hockey player and captain for the Minnesota Frost and the United States national team. With the national team, she has won seven gold medals at the IIHF World Women's Championships (2011, 2013, 2015, 2016, 2017, 2019, 2025) and the gold medal at the 2018 Winter Olympics and the 2026 Winter Olympics.

As captain of the Minnesota Frost, she led the team to back-to-back Walter Cup championships in 2024 and 2025. In 2019, she won the Isobel Cup championship with the Minnesota Whitecaps in the National Women's Hockey League. At Northeastern, she won the Patty Kazmaier Memorial Award as the top player in NCAA women's hockey (2016), the Hockey Humanitarian Award (2016), and the NCAA Today's Top 10 Award (2017).

Coyne Schofield has also been a color commentator for the San Jose Sharks. In 2020, she was hired by the Chicago Blackhawks as a player development coach for their American Hockey League affiliate, the Rockford IceHogs. In January 2019, she became the first woman to compete in the NHL All-Star Skills Competition, posting a time of 14.326 seconds in the fastest skater event.

== Early life ==
Born in Palos Heights, Illinois to John and Ahlise Coyne, Kendall began skating at age three, following her older brother Kevin to the ice hockey rink. Initially, her parents enrolled her in figure skating, but after approximately one week, Coyne informed them that she wanted to play hockey instead. Growing up in Palos Heights, she developed her passion for sports and being active largely through area parks. Coyne has two brothers and one sister. Her oldest brother, Kevin, played NCAA Division III hockey. Her younger brother, Jake, is a member of the United States Army. Her younger sister, Bailey, is a forward for the Lindenwood Women's Ice Hockey Team.

From 2006 to 2010, Coyne attended Sandburg High School in Orland Park, Illinois. During this period, Coyne played for the Chicago Mission Under-19 girls' team. In the 2009–10 season alone, she scored 53 goals and registered 34 assists in 46 games. Over three seasons with the Mission, Coyne accumulated 254 points in 157 games. She participated in two national championship games with the Mission, winning one title.

External videos
- How Kendall Coyne Schofield's roots drive her Olympic journey NBC Sports

For the 2010–2011 academic year, Coyne attended the Berkshire School, a prep school in Sheffield, Massachusetts. During her single season at Berkshire, she totaled 77 points on 55 goals and 22 assists in just 25 games. Her exceptional performance earned her recognition as the New England Prep School Player of the Year. As a child who loved to read, Coyne searched for books about people pursuing paths similar to hers in hockey, but found limited representation of women in the sport on library bookshelves. This experience of forging her own path in a sport that "did not make it easy for a young girl to get a skate in the door" would later inspire her to write her own memoir.

== Playing career ==
=== Collegiate ===
On April 28, 2011, it was announced that Coyne committed to the Northeastern Huskies women's ice hockey program. She enrolled at Northeastern in the fall of 2011 and immediately made an impact on the program. During her freshman season in 2011–12, Coyne appeared in 37 games and recorded 59 points on 26 goals and 33 assists, earning Hockey East All-Rookie Team honors. She helped lead the Huskies to the NCAA Tournament.

In her sophomore year (2012–13), Coyne tallied 80 points on 35 goals and 45 assists in 37 games, setting a Northeastern single-season points record. She was named Hockey East Player of the Year and earned First Team All-American honors from the American Hockey Coaches Association. As a junior in 2013–14, despite missing time due to her Olympic commitments with Team USA at the 2014 Winter Olympics, Coyne registered 59 points in 29 games. She again earned First Team All-American recognition.

In her senior season (2015–16), Coyne had another dominant year, recording 65 points on 26 goals and 39 assists in 38 games. She became Northeastern's all-time leading scorer, finishing her career with 263 points (113 goals, 150 assists) in 141 games. On March 26, 2016, Coyne was awarded the Patty Kazmaier Award as the top female college ice hockey player in the United States, becoming the second player from Northeastern to win the honor (Brooke Whitney, 2002). She also received the Hockey Humanitarian Award that year for her community service efforts. During her time at Northeastern, Coyne was a four-time Hockey East First Team All-Star and helped elevate the profile of the Huskies' women's hockey program.

=== Professional ===
==== Boston Pride (2015) ====
In the 2015 NWHL Draft, Coyne was selected third overall by the Boston Pride on June 20, 2015. She was one of the top selections in the inaugural National Women's Hockey League draft, reflecting her status as one of the premier players in women's hockey. However, Coyne did not play for the Pride, as she focused on her final collegiate season at Northeastern and preparation for international competition.

==== Minnesota Whitecaps (2016–19) ====
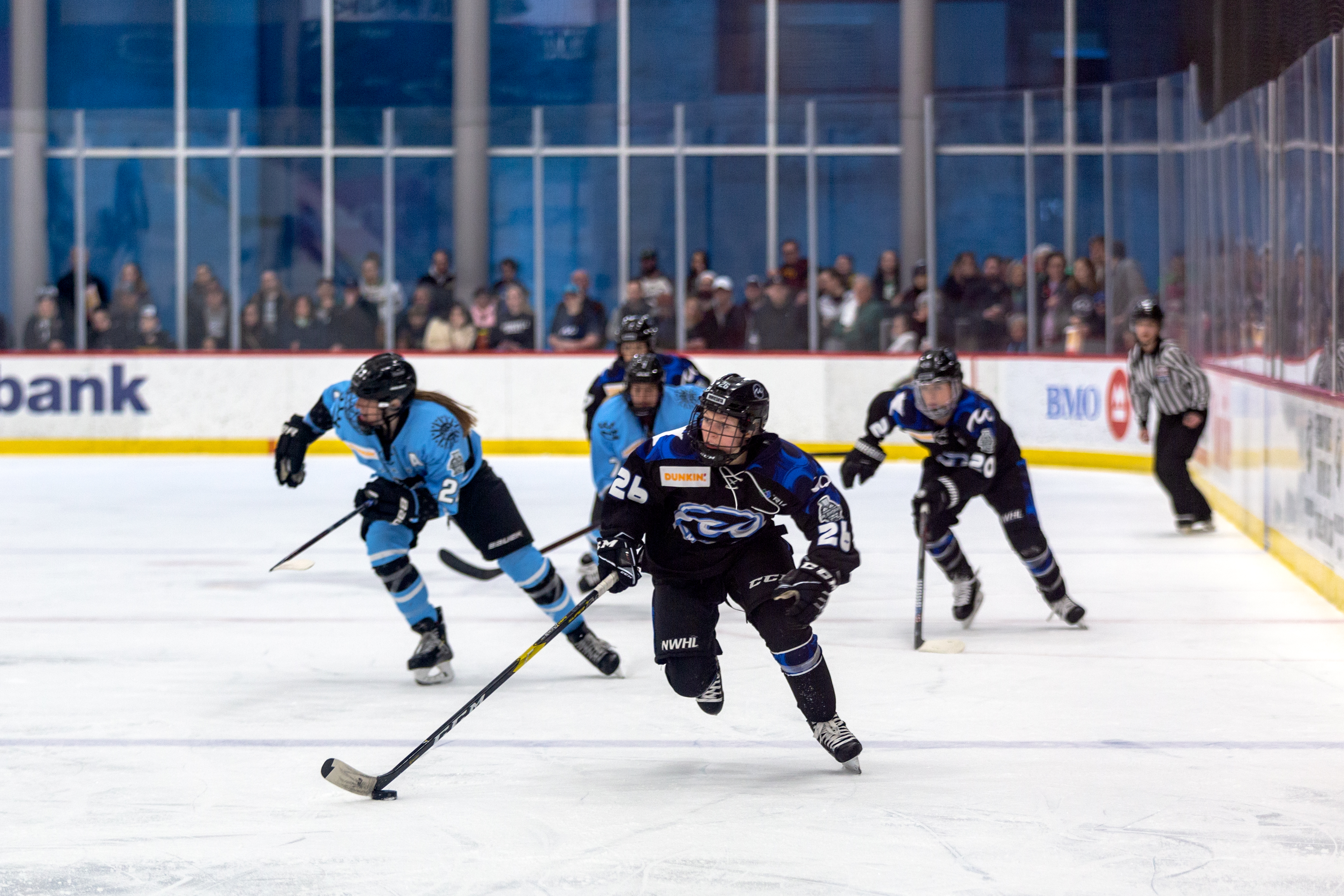
In their final game of the season, Coyne and the Minnesota Whitecaps won in overtime to beat the Buffalo Beauts 2-1 to capture the Isobel Cup for the inaugural season of the NWHL.

In July 2016, following her graduation from Northeastern, Coyne signed with the independent Minnesota Whitecaps, who were competing outside the NWHL at the time. The move allowed her to play professionally while remaining close to the U.S. national team's training center in Minnesota.

Coyne played two seasons with the independent Whitecaps before the team joined the NWHL for the 2018–19 season. In the Whitecaps' inaugural NWHL season, Coyne helped lead the team to the 2019 Isobel Cup Finals, where they defeated the Buffalo Beauts to win the championship. She recorded 14 points in 13 regular season games that year.

On December 5, 2018, Coyne was named to Team Szabados for the 2019 NWHL All-Star Weekend, one of ten Olympic medalists selected for the event.

==== Chicago Pro Hockey League (2018) ====
On July 11, 2018, Coyne became the first woman to play in the Chicago Pro Hockey League at MB Arena, a league that features 80 professional players and 80 amateurs competing in summer hockey. Her participation in the co-ed professional league demonstrated her skill level and competitiveness against male players.

==== NHL All-Star Weekend and broadcasting (2019–20) ====
External videos
- Kendall Coyne Schofield makes history in Fastest Skater, NHL

On January 25, 2019, Coyne made history when she was named a replacement for Colorado Avalanche forward Nathan MacKinnon at the 2019 NHL All-Star Skills fastest-skater challenge as part of the 2019 NHL All-Star weekend in San Jose, California. Although she was originally scheduled to demonstrate the challenges, she became the first woman to compete in an NHL All-Star skills competition when MacKinnon withdrew due to injury. Coyne recorded a time of 14.326 seconds in the fastest-skater competition, placing her seventh out of eight skaters, which was comparable to several male competitors in the field. Connor McDavid won the competition with a time of 13.378 seconds, less than one second faster than Coyne. Her performance was widely praised and brought significant attention to women's hockey.

Following her All-Star appearance, Coyne served as a broadcasting analyst during the Pittsburgh Penguins and Tampa Bay Lightning game on Wednesday Night Hockey on January 30, 2019, marking her debut as a hockey broadcaster. She was a color commentator for some San Jose Sharks games during the 2019–20 season. On January 15, 2020, Coyne was one of ten players named to the US roster for the Elite Women's 3-on-3 tournament at the 2020 NHL All-Star Weekend in St. Louis, continuing her involvement with NHL events.

==== Professional Women's Hockey Players Association (2019–23) ====
Following the dissolution of the Canadian Women's Hockey League in May 2019, Coyne Schofield was one of over 200 prominent North American players who announced their intent to boycott existing professional leagues, citing dissatisfaction with low salaries, lack of health insurance, and inadequate resources. On May 20, 2019, she became one of nine founding board members of the Professional Women's Hockey Players Association (PWHPA), a nonprofit organization dedicated to advocating for a sustainable professional women's hockey league in North America. Coyne Schofield stated at the time, "We are fortunate to be ambassadors of this beautiful game, and it is our responsibility to make sure the next generation of players have more opportunities than we had."

As a board member and later president of the PWHPA, Coyne Schofield helped organize the organization's Dream Gap Tour from 2019 to 2023, a series of barnstorming exhibition games held in NHL arenas and other venues across North America to build support for a new professional league. The tour included a landmark game at Madison Square Garden on February 28, 2021—the first professional women's hockey game ever played at the venue and the first to be broadcast live on television. She served as a player representative on the PWHPA board and was instrumental in connecting the organization with Billie Jean King and Ilana Kloss, who helped bring investor Mark Walter to the project.

==== Minnesota Frost (2023–present) ====
On September 6, 2023, Coyne was one of the first players to sign a contract in the new Professional Women's Hockey League (PWHL), signing with Minnesota. As one of the most recognizable players in women's hockey and a multiple Olympic medalist, her commitment to the league was seen as a major endorsement for the new professional organization, which aimed to provide sustainable, professional opportunities for women's hockey players in North America.

===== 2023–24 season =====
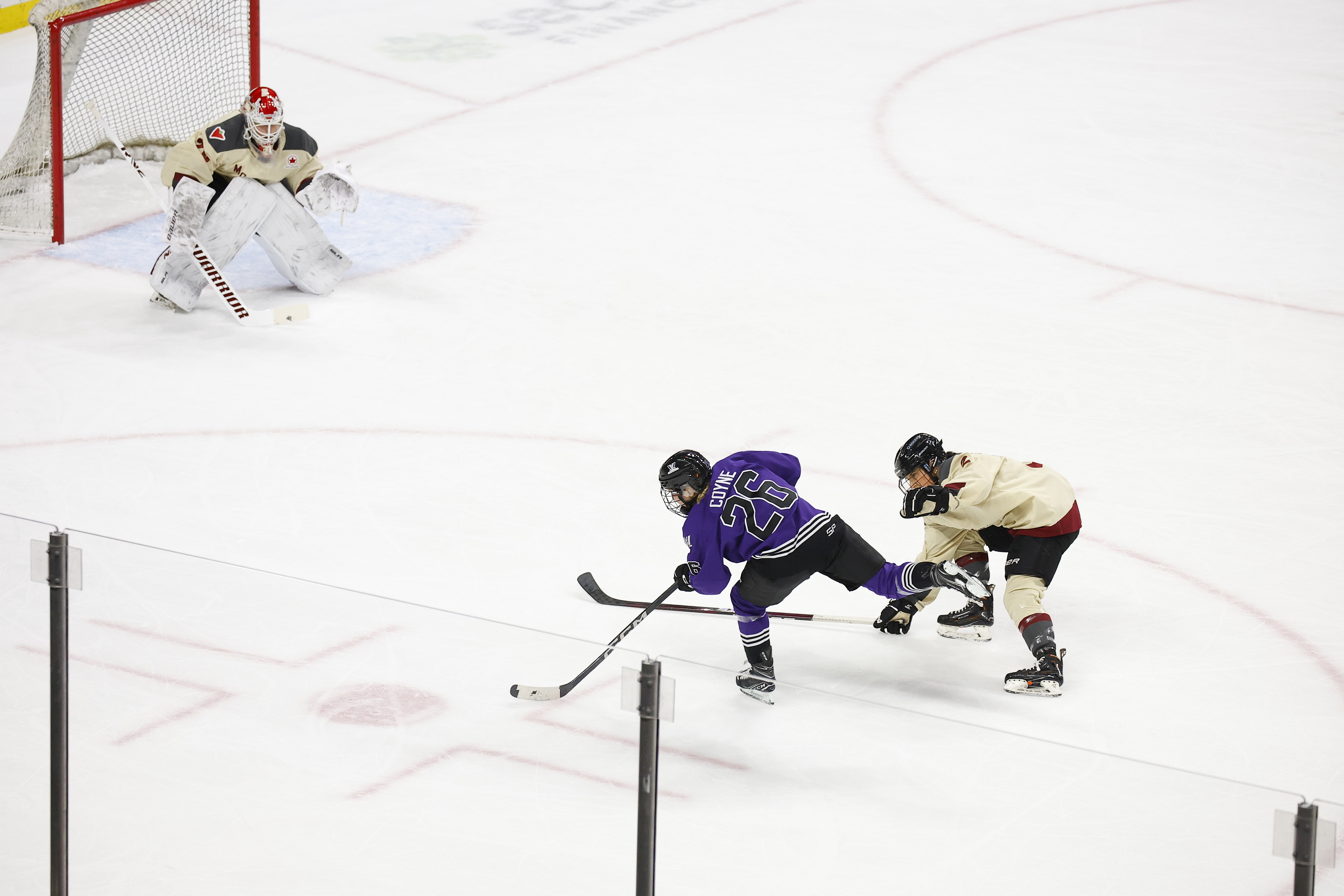
Coyne playing for the Frost vs Montreal, January 2024

Ahead of the start of the league's inaugural season, Coyne was named Minnesota's first captain on January 3, 2024, just days before the season opener. The announcement recognized her leadership experience with the U.S. national team and her status as one of the franchise's marquee players. During the regular season, Coyne appeared in 23 games for Minnesota, recording 10 goals and 10 assists for 20 points. She helped lead Minnesota to a strong regular season performance, as the team finished with a record that earned them a playoff berth. Beyond her on-ice contributions, Coyne served as an ambassador for the league, participating in media events and helping to build the PWHL's profile during its crucial first season.

In the playoffs, Minnesota advanced through the postseason bracket, with Coyne providing veteran leadership and key contributions in key moments. The team reached the Walter Cup Finals, where they faced Boston in a best-of-five series. On May 29, 2024, Coyne captained Minnesota to a 3–0 victory over Boston in the decisive Game 5 of the Walter Cup Finals at the Tsongas Center in Lowell, Massachusetts. With the game already secured, Coyne scored an empty-net goal in the final minutes to seal the 3–0 victory, becoming the first captain to lift the Walter Cup in PWHL history. The championship victory was particularly meaningful as it came in the league's inaugural season, establishing Minnesota as the PWHL's first dynasty and cementing Coyne's legacy in professional hockey. Following the championship, Coyne spoke emotionally about the significance of the moment for hockey, stating that the PWHL represented the future of the sport and the culmination of decades of advocacy for better professional opportunities for female players.

===== 2024–25 season =====
Coyne returned as captain for Minnesota's second PWHL season in 2024–25. Just 24 seconds into the season opener, Coyne scored the quickest goal to start a game in PWHL history to that point, setting the tone for what would become a dominant individual season. On December 2, 2025, Coyne recorded her first career PWHL hat trick in a 5–1 victory over the Ottawa Charge at TD Place. Her opening goal came just 24 seconds into the first period and helped Minnesota set a PWHL record for the fastest three goals to start a game. The performance showcased her offensive skill, particularly her second goal of the game early in the third period, where she displayed her elite skating ability by turning a defender inside out before beating the goaltender glove side. With the hat trick, Coyne became just the sixth player in PWHL history to reach 20 career goals.

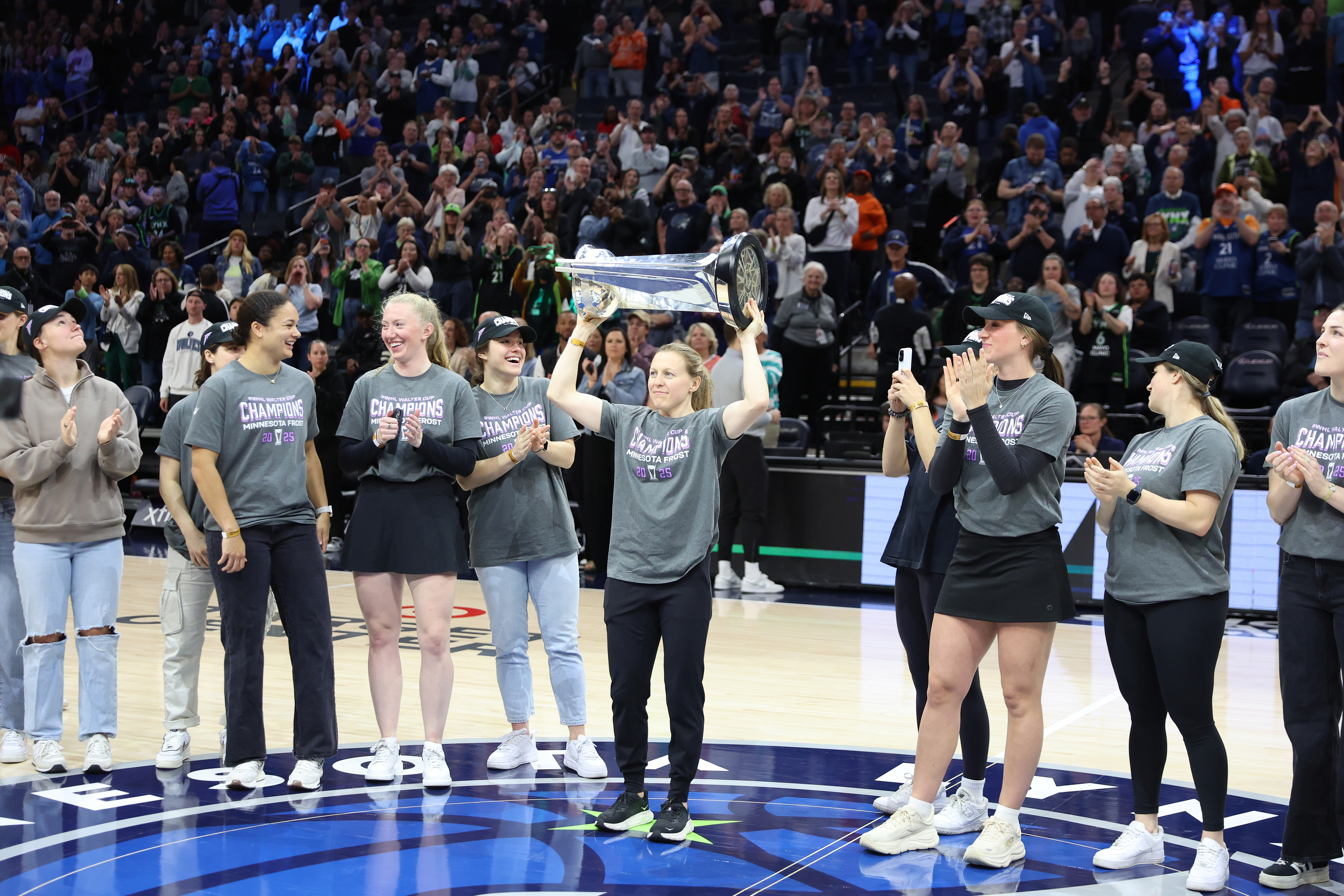
Coyne raises the Walter Cup at a Minnesota Lynx game, May 2025

By late December, Coyne led the PWHL with seven goals in eight games, surpassing her six-goal total from 24 games in the league's inaugural season. In a December 30 victory over Toronto, she recorded two goals and an assist, giving her nine points and moving her into second place in the league scoring race. Despite her strong individual season, Minnesota struggled during the regular season, clinching the fourth and final playoff spot only on the last day, mirroring their underdog path from the previous year. As the fourth seed, Minnesota faced the second-seeded Toronto Sceptres in the semifinals, defeating them 3–1 in the series to advance to the Finals for the second consecutive year. In the 2025 PWHL Finals, Minnesota faced the Ottawa Charge in a rematch that saw all four games decided by 2–1 overtime scores. After losing Game 1, Minnesota won three consecutive overtime games to capture the series.

On May 26, 2025, Coyne and the Frost won their second consecutive Walter Cup with a 2–1 overtime victory over Ottawa in Game 4 at Xcel Energy Center in front of 11,024 fans. The Walter Cup was presented to Coyne by Kimbra Walter, PWHL Advisory Board members Billie Jean King and Ilana Kloss, and PWHL Executive Vice President of Hockey Operations Jayna Hefford. The championship made Minnesota the first team in PWHL history to win back-to-back Walter Cup titles. Six Frost players, including Coyne, made PWHL history by becoming the first to win a Walter Cup in the same season as a gold medal at the IIHF Women's World Championship, as Team USA had captured gold in Czechia the previous month.

== International play ==
Coyne has been a mainstay of the United States women's national ice hockey team since her youth career, establishing herself as one of the most decorated American players in international competition. With three Olympic medals (two gold, two silver), seven World Championship gold medals, and numerous individual honors, she has represented Team USA in over 26 international tournaments across all levels of competition.

=== Junior ===
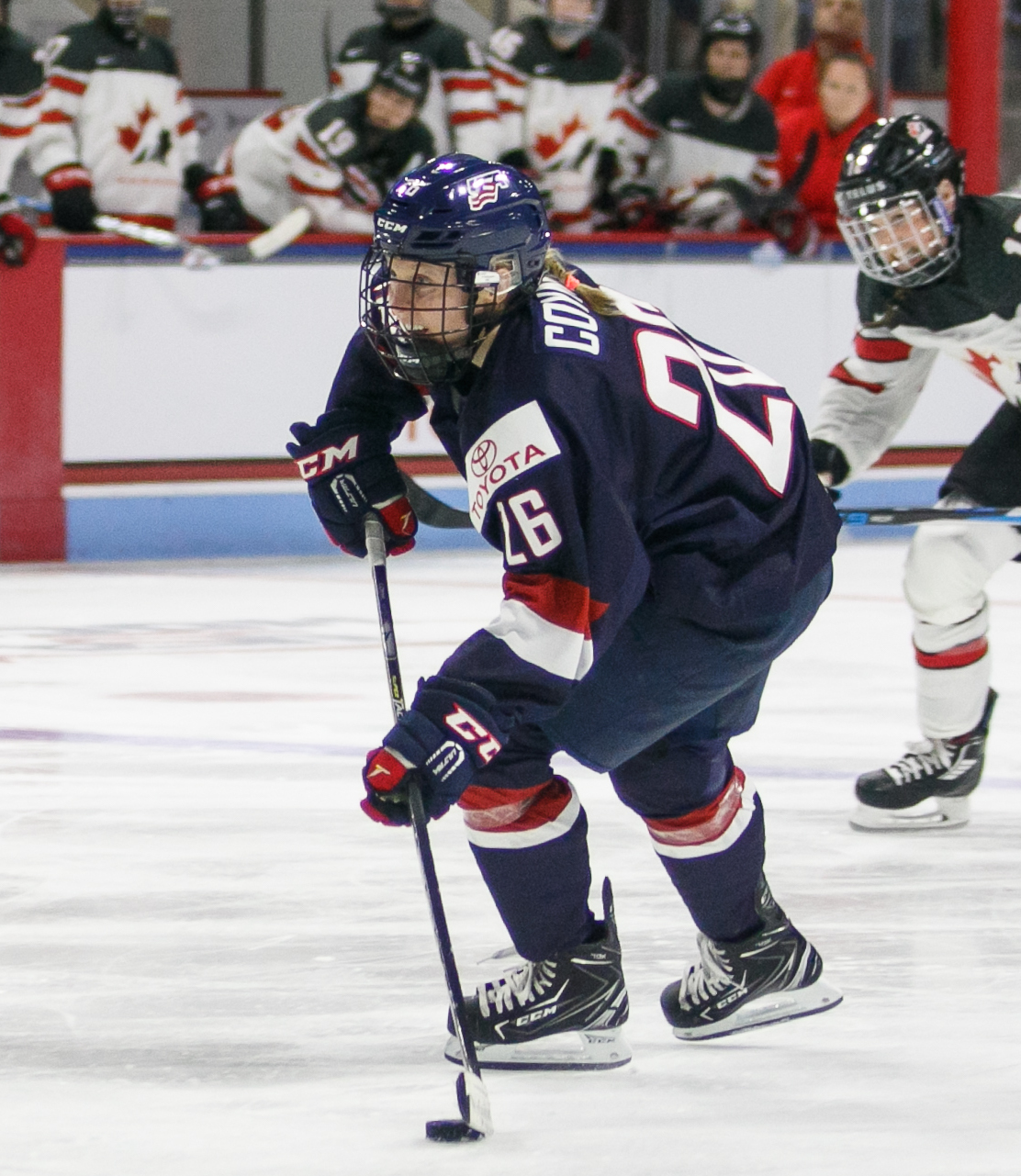
Coyne playing for Team USA in 2017

Coyne made her mark on the international stage at a remarkably young age. On January 10, 2009, in Fussen, Germany, she scored the game-winning goal in overtime to lead the United States to gold at the 2009 IIHF Under-19 Championships. Just months later in August 2009, at only 17 years old, Coyne became the youngest player invited to the USA Hockey women's national festival in Blaine, Minnesota—a selection camp for the senior national team that would constitute players for the 2010 Olympic team. She was one of 41 players invited to the prestigious camp.

Coyne continued to excel at the youth level, scoring for the United States in the gold medal game of the 2010 Four Nations Cup. After the 2010 Four Nations Cup, she had accumulated 36 career points (24 goals, 12 assists) in 27 games with the U.S. national team. During her youth career, Coyne competed in three IIHF U18 World Women's Championships, taking home gold in 2008 and 2009 and silver in 2010. She established herself as the tournament’s all-time leading scorer with 33 points (22 goals, 11 assists) in just 15 games—a record that stood for over 15 years until Nela Lopušanová tied it in 2026.

=== Senior ===
Coyne's transition to the senior national team came in 2011. On January 28, she was named to the preliminary roster, and from April 4 to 12, participated as one of 30 players in a selection and training camp. She ultimately earned a spot on the final roster that competed at the 2011 IIHF Women's World Championship in Zurich and Winterthur, Switzerland.

==== IIHF World Women's Championships ====
Coyne has been a cornerstone of Team USA's dominance at the IIHF World Women's Championships, competing in eleven tournaments and earning an astounding collection of medals. Her first World Championship appearance in 2011 resulted in a gold medal, followed by a silver medal in 2012 at Burlington, Vermont, where she was named U.S. Player of the Game in the gold-medal contest (April 14) and finished second overall in the tournament in plus/minus rating (+10).

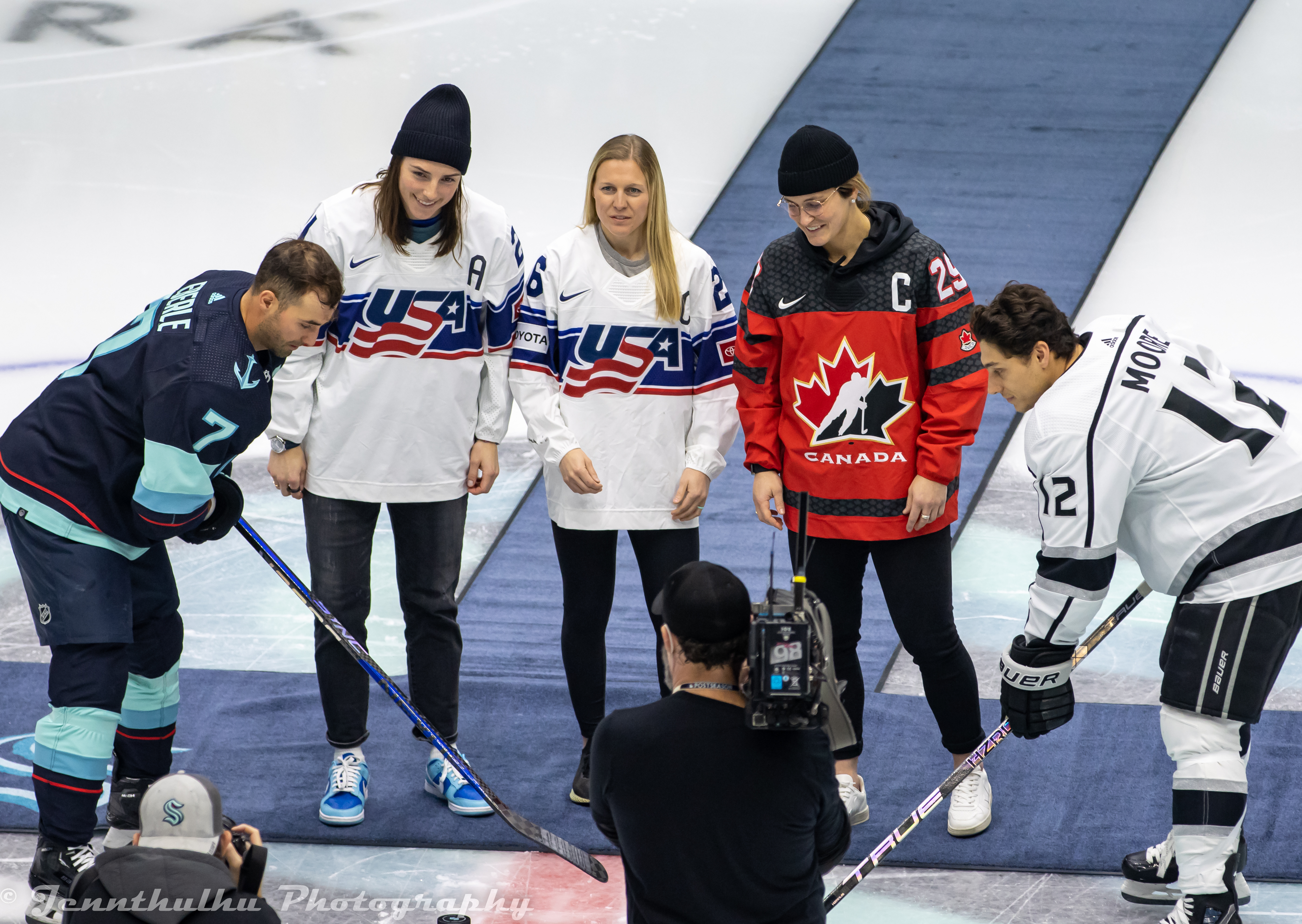
Coyne Schofield, Hilary Knight, and Team Canada captain Marie-Philip Poulin, November 19, 2022

The 2013 IIHF Women's World Championship in Ottawa, Ontario saw Coyne return to the top of the podium, capturing gold while tying for sixth overall with four assists. She continued her golden streak in 2015 at Malmö, Sweden, where she tied for the tournament lead with a plus-8 rating, and again in 2016 at Kamloops, British Columbia. The 2017 World Championship, held in Plymouth, Michigan, proved to be one of Coyne's most dominant performances. She tied for the tournament lead with 12 points and five goals, earning recognition as U.S. Player of the Game in both a preliminary-round matchup against Russia and the semifinals versus Germany. She was also named one of the top three U.S. players of the tournament. The championship game itself became an instant classic, with Coyne assisting on Hilary Knight's overtime winner against Canada. Knight blocked a shot inside the U.S. blue line, moved the puck up to Coyne, who rushed in with speed before dropping the puck back to Knight for the decisive goal. The tournament victory marked Team USA's fourth consecutive World Championship gold.

At the 2019 IIHF Women's World Championship in Espoo, Finland, Coyne served as team captain. She finished the tournament with nine points (5 goals, 4 assists) in five games and an impressive plus-eleven rating. Her exceptional performance earned her selection to the Media All-Star Team alongside teammates Hilary Knight and Cayla Barnes, and she received the Directorate Award as the tournament's top forward. Team USA captured their fifth consecutive world championship in dramatic fashion, defeating Finland in a shootout after a 1-1 tie through regulation and overtime. She was also named the Bob Allen Women's Player of the Year for 2019.

Through her World Championship career, Coyne has won seven gold medals (2011, 2013, 2015, 2016, 2017, 2019, and 2025) and four silver medals (2012, 2021, 2022, and 2024), establishing herself as one of the most decorated players in tournament history. Notably, she is approaching the all-time Women's World Championship assist record; as of December 2025, she sits at 48 career assists, just one behind the record of 49 held by Hayley Wickenheiser.

==== Olympic Winter Games ====
Coyne has represented the United States at three Olympic Winter Games, earning three medals across her Olympic career. She made her Olympic debut at the Sochi 2014 Olympic Winter Games, where Team USA claimed the silver medal after losing to Canada in the gold medal game. Despite the loss, Coyne was the leading scorer for Team USA with six points on two goals and four assists while skating in all five games. Four years later at the PyeongChang 2018 Olympic Winter Games, Coyne helped Team USA defeat Canada in a dramatic sudden-death shootout to claim gold. She recorded two goals and an assist in five games and led the team in shots on goal with 21, showcasing her offensive prowess throughout the tournament.

External videos
- Kendall Coyne Schofield: 2022 Olympic Introduction, USA Hockey

Coyne returned to Olympic competition at the Beijing 2022 Olympic Winter Games, this time serving as a team captain. She recorded three goals and three assists in seven games, but Team USA fell short in the gold medal game, losing 3-2 to Canada to claim silver. Beyond Olympic and World Championship competition, Coyne has continued to excel in international play. On December 11, 2025, during the third game of the 2025 Rivalry Series in Edmonton, Alberta, she contributed a goal and two assists in a historic 10-4 victory over Canada—marking the first time the Canadian women's national ice hockey team had allowed 10 goals in a loss to the United States.

On January 2, 2026, Coyne was named to team USA's roster for the 2026 Winter Olympics in Italy. During the team's quarterfinal game against Italy, she scored two goals helping lift the U.S. to a 6-0 win.

== Other work ==
In addition to her playing career, Coyne has served in various leadership roles in women's hockey. She served on the board of directors for the Professional Women's Hockey Players Association (PWHPA) non-profit organization. After the founding of the PWHL in 2023, she was named to the executive committee of the league's labour union, the PWHL Players Association.

On March 1, 2021, the Chicago Red Stars of the National Women's Soccer League announced that Coyne and her spouse Michael Schofield had joined the women's soccer team's ownership group.

=== Foundation ===
Coyne Schofield and her husband operate the Kendall and Michael Schofield Family Foundation. In 2023, the foundation sponsored renovation of Schussler Park in Orland Park. The park was renamed to the "Michael Schofield III Sports Complex" in recognition of the foundation's funding. The foundation had partnered with the activist Andrew Holmes's titular Andrew Holmes Foundation to organize winter holiday events for Chicago families who had been impacted by gun violence. Additionally, in 2022 and 2023 the Schofields joined Holmes in distributing gun safety locks to help prevent household gun incidents involving children. The Schofields provided 500 locks themselves.

=== Filmography ===
Year	Title	Role	Notes
2024	Inside Out 2	Hockey announcer	

== In popular culture ==
Coyne Schofield has appeared in various media and entertainment projects throughout her career. In 2020, she starred in two television commercials for Dunkin' Donuts alongside Boston Bruins forward David Pastrňák, including spots titled "Talkin' Hockey: Sweater" and "Talkin' Hockey With Pasta and Kendall: Chirps," in which the two players explained hockey terminology to viewers. She has also appeared in promotional spots for NBC Sports Network, the National Hockey League, and the PWHPA.

Following her historic appearance at the 2019 NHL All-Star Weekend, Coyne Schofield served as a guest analyst for NBC Sports' broadcast of a Pittsburgh Penguins versus Tampa Bay Lightning game on January 30, 2019. The appearance drew attention after analyst Pierre McGuire was perceived as condescending during a pregame segment, prompting McGuire to issue a statement expressing his "utmost respect" for Coyne Schofield and acknowledging he "should have chosen [his] words better." Coyne Schofield addressed the incident in a statement, writing, "What is important is for every young girl reading this to know that it doesn't matter what anyone thinks of my hockey knowledge -- because I do not doubt my hockey knowledge."

In December 2021, EA Sports announced that Coyne Schofield and other women's national team players would be featured as playable characters in NHL 22 for the first time in the video game franchise's history, marking a significant milestone for representation in sports gaming. The update, released in January 2022, added International Ice Hockey Federation women's national teams and the IIHF Women's World Championship to the game. Coyne Schofield called the inclusion "instrumental" for women's hockey, stating, "A lot of us grew up without seeing role models on a consistent basis. We'd go to NHL games and never see anyone that looked like us. I'm so excited to see what kind of effect this is going to have on the next generations, seeing women and men in the same game, knowing that they can be either one of us." When asked about her player speed rating, she joked, "If there was one opportunity for 100% in my game, it would be my speed." She has continued to appear in subsequent editions of the EA Sports NHL series, including NHL 23, where women players were integrated into the Hockey Ultimate Team mode alongside male NHL stars, and NHL 26.

In March 2024, Coyne Schofield announced she would voice a hockey announcer in Disney and Pixar's animated film Inside Out 2, which was released on June 14, 2024. Disney and Pixar reached out to her in February 2023, and she recorded her lines in April 2023 at a downtown Chicago studio. The film's main character, Riley, is a hockey player, and producer Mark Nielsen noted that Coyne Schofield's voice can be heard repeatedly during the movie's many hockey scenes rather than as a brief cameo. Coyne Schofield described the role as "a once-in-a-lifetime opportunity" and emphasized the importance of representation in media, noting that she grew up watching The Mighty Ducks because it featured girls on the hockey team and allowed her to see herself reflected on screen. She compared the fan response to her role to winning a gold medal, stating, "This is something that will be a part of my legacy for when I'm done playing hockey, and this movie will live on forever and impact people forever." She attended both the Los Angeles and Chicago premieres of the film in June 2024.

== Personal life ==
Coyne Schofield graduated from Northeastern University in Boston with a B.A. in communication studies. In 2017, she graduated with an M.S. summa cum laude in corporate and organizational communications at Northeastern University. She is married to former NFL player Michael Schofield. They attended the same high school in Orland Park, but did not start to date until they were both college-age and met at a local gym. They wed in July 2018. Coyne gave birth to their first child, a son on July 1, 2023. On October 29, 2026, Kendall announced that she was pregnant with her second child, and would miss the 2026–27 PWHL season.

== Career statistics ==
=== Regular season and playoffs ===
Note: GP = Games played; G = Goals; A = Assists; Pts = Points; PIM = Penalty minutes;

			Regular season					Playoffs
Season	Team	League	GP	G	A	Pts	PIM	GP	G	A	Pts	PIM
2007–08	Chicago Mission	T1EHL	18	13	12	25	14	—	—	—	—	—
2008–09	Chicago Mission	T1EHL	12	13	7	20	8	—	—	—	—	—
2009–10	Chicago Mission	T1EHL	19	25	14	39	8	—	—	—	—	—
2010–11	Berkshire School	NEPSAC	25	55	22	77	12	—	—	—	—	—
2011–12	Northeastern Huskies	HEA	31	26	19	45	34	—	—	—	—	—
2012–13	Northeastern Huskies	HEA	34	37	31	68	26	—	—	—	—	—
2014–15	Northeastern Huskies	HEA	31	28	24	52	12	—	—	—	—	—
2015–16	Northeastern Huskies	HEA	37	50	34	84	24	—	—	—	—	—
2018–19	Minnesota Whitecaps	NWHL	13	7	7	14	4	2	0	2	2	2
2019–20	Minnesota	PWHPA	—	—	—	—	—	—	—	—	—	—
2020–21	Minnesota	PWHPA	6	5	1	6	2	—	—	—	—	—
2022–23	Team Adidas	PWHPA	9	6	4	10	0	—	—	—	—	—
2023–24	PWHL Minnesota	PWHL	24	6	10	16	6	10	1	3	4	0
2024–25	Minnesota Frost	PWHL	30	12	12	24	4	8	2	2	4	0
2025–26	Minnesota Frost	PWHL	23	12	11	23	0	5	1	1	2	0
NCAA totals			133	141	108	249	96	—	—	—	—	—
NWHL totals			13	7	7	14	4	2	0	2	2	2
PWHPA totals			15	11	6	17	2	—	—	—	—	—
PWHL totals			77	30	33	63	10	23	4	6	10	0

=== International ===
Year	Team	Event	Result	GP	G	A	Pts	PIM
2008	United States	U18	1st place, gold medalist(s)	5	4	2	6	4
2009	United States	U18	1st place, gold medalist(s)	5	8	7	15	2
2010	United States	U18	2nd place, silver medalist(s)	5	10	2	12	2
2011	United States	WC	1st place, gold medalist(s)	5	4	2	6	0
2012	United States	WC	2nd place, silver medalist(s)	5	4	5	9	0
2013	United States	WC	1st place, gold medalist(s)	5	1	4	5	2
2014	United States	OG	2nd place, silver medalist(s)	5	2	4	6	2
2015	United States	WC	1st place, gold medalist(s)	5	3	4	7	0
2016	United States	WC	1st place, gold medalist(s)	5	1	2	3	4
2017	United States	WC	1st place, gold medalist(s)	5	5	7	12	0
2018	United States	OG	1st place, gold medalist(s)	5	2	1	3	2
2019	United States	WC	1st place, gold medalist(s)	7	5	4	9	2
2021	United States	WC	2nd place, silver medalist(s)	7	2	3	5	0
2022	United States	OG	2nd place, silver medalist(s)	7	3	3	6	2
2022	United States	WC	2nd place, silver medalist(s)	7	1	10	11	2
2024	United States	WC	2nd place, silver medalist(s)	7	3	6	9	0
2025	United States	WC	1st place, gold medalist(s)	7	2	2	4	0
2026	United States	OG	1st place, gold medalist(s)	7	3	0	3	0
Junior totals				15	22	11	33	8
Senior totals				89	41	57	98	16

== Books ==
Coyne wrote an autobiography, As Fast As Her: Dream Big, Break Barriers, Achieve Success, co-written with Estelle Laure, published in January 2022.

== Awards and honors ==
- 2012–13: American Hockey Coaches Association, CCM Hockey Women's Division I, All Americans, Second Team
- 2015: American Hockey Coaches Association, CCM Hockey Women's Division I All-Americans, Second Team
- 2016: Patty Kazmaier Award CCM Hockey Women's Division I, All Americans
- 2017: NCAA, Today's Top 10 Award Tied for tournament lead with 12 points and five goals. Named U.S. Player of the Game in a preliminary-round matchup against Russia and the semifinals versus Germany. Also named one of the Top Three U.S. Players of the Tournament

=== Hockey East ===
- Hockey East Rookie of the Week (Week of October 31, 2011)
- Hockey East Rookie of the Week (Week of November 28, 2011)
- Hockey East Player of the Month (Month of November 2011)
- Hockey East Rookie of the Week (Week of January 23, 2012)
- Hockey East Player of the Month (Month of January 2012)
- 2014–15 Hockey East First Team All-Star

=== USA Hockey ===
- 2011 U.S. Player of the Game, November 12, 2011, vs. Finland, 2011 4 Nations Cup
- 2017 Tied for tournament lead with 12 points and five goals. Named U.S. Player of the Game in a preliminary-round matchup against Russia and the semifinals versus Germany. Also named one of the Top Three U.S. Players of the Tournament
- 2019 Served as team captain. Finished with nine points (5g 4a) in five games and a plus eleven rating. Named to the Media All-Star Team along with teammates Hilary Knight and Cayla Barnes. Won the Directorate Award as top forward in the tournament. Earned the Bob Allen Women's Player of the Year Award

=== NWHL ===
- Isobel Cup Champion (2019)

=== PWHL ===
- Walter Cup Champion (2024, 2025)
- Second All-Star Team (2025)

Awards and achievements
Preceded by Meghan Duggan	Captain, United States Olympic Hockey Team; 2022	Incumbent
Preceded by Alex Carpenter	Patty Kazmaier Award; 2015–16	Succeeded by Ann-Renée Desbiens
Preceded by Position created	Minnesota Frost captain 2023–present	Incumbent
