= Jessica Platt =

Hockey player and transgender rights advocate (b. 1989)

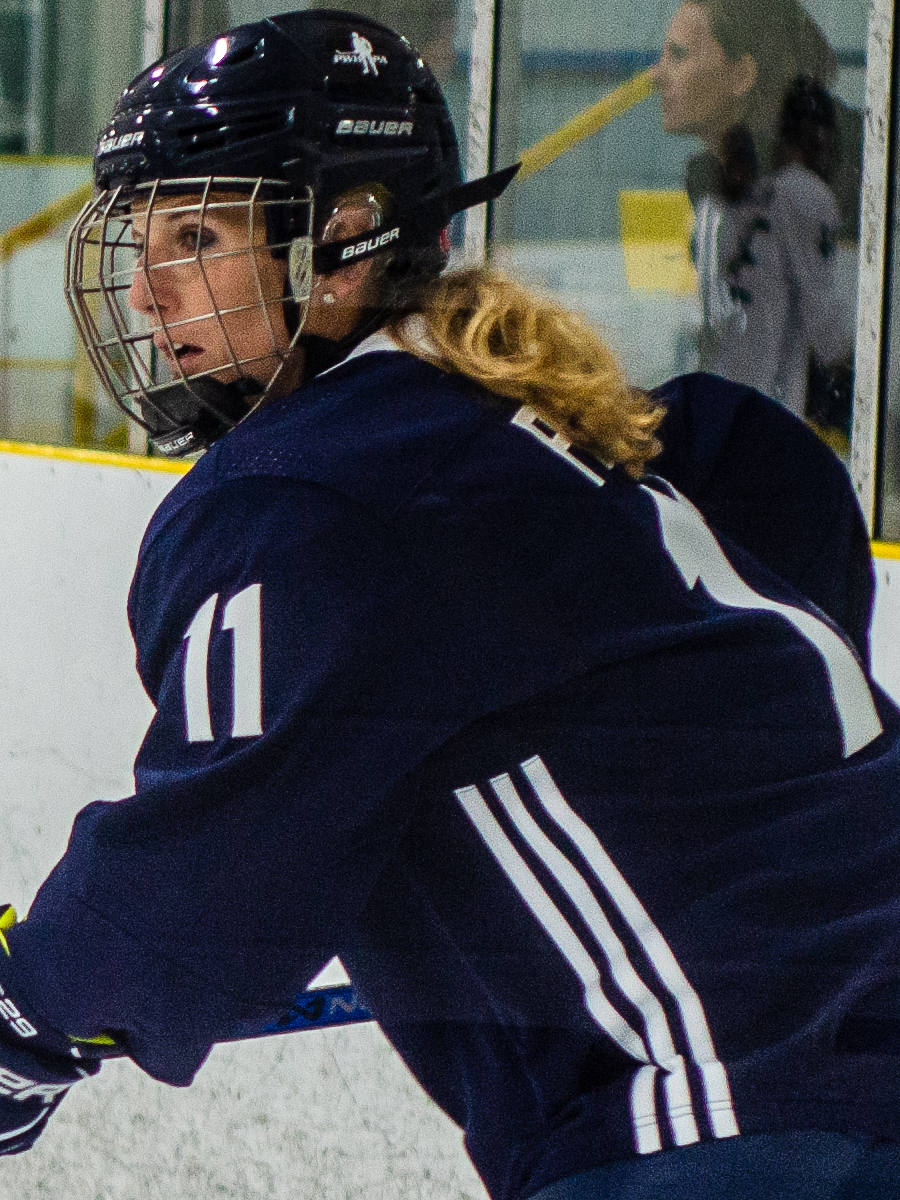
- Platt in 2019
- Born: May 8, 1989 (age 36); Sarnia, Ontario, Canada
- Height: 173 cm (5 ft 8 in)
- Weight: 70 kg (154 lb; 11 st 0 lb)
- Position: Defence
- Shot: Left
- Played for: PWHPA; Toronto Furies
- Playing career: 2016–2021

Jessica Platt (born May 8, 1989) is a Canadian former professional ice hockey player and an advocate for transgender rights. She played for the Toronto Furies in the Canadian Women's Hockey League (CWHL) and was the first transgender woman to play in the now-defunct league.

== Career ==
Platt was drafted into the Canadian Women's Hockey League in 2016 in the 61st overall pick and was invited to play four games for the Toronto Furies in the 2016–17 season when another player was injured. During the following season she played full-time.

== Early life and transition ==
Platt spent her childhood in Brights Grove, Ontario, and attended a Catholic secondary school for which she played hockey. After leaving high school, Platt started to undertake hormone replacement therapy in 2012, with full support from her family.

She graduated from Wilfrid Laurier University in 2014 and worked teaching children to ice skate on campus. Platt then joined a recreational league to return to hockey.

== Public reception and recognition ==
Platt announced that she was transgender through Instagram on January 10, 2018, following support from within the sports community. Platt was the first professional women's hockey player to come out as a transgender woman, and the second player in professional women's hockey to come out as transgender following Harrison Browne's coming out as a transgender man in October 2016 while playing in the National Women's Hockey League. Platt told sources that Browne was instrumental in her decision to announce her identity.

In September 2018, Platt was recognized as one of Canada's Women of Influence's "Top 25 Women of Influence 2018".

== Career statistics ==
| | | | Regular Season | | | | | Playoffs |
| Season | Team | League | GP | G | A | Pts | PIM | GP | G | A | Pts | PIM |
|---|---|---|---|---|---|---|---|---|---|---|---|---|
| 2016–17 | Toronto Furies | CWHL | 4 | 0 | 0 | 0 | 0 | — | — | — | — | — |
| 2017–18 | Toronto Furies | CWHL | 27 | 2 | 0 | 2 | 14 | — | — | — | — | — |
| 2018–19 | Toronto Furies | CWHL | 18 | 0 | 1 | 1 | 0 | — | — | — | — | — |
| CWHL totals | | | 49 | 2 | 1 | 3 | 14 | — | — | — | — | — |
