= Renata Fast =

Canadian ice hockey player (born 1994)

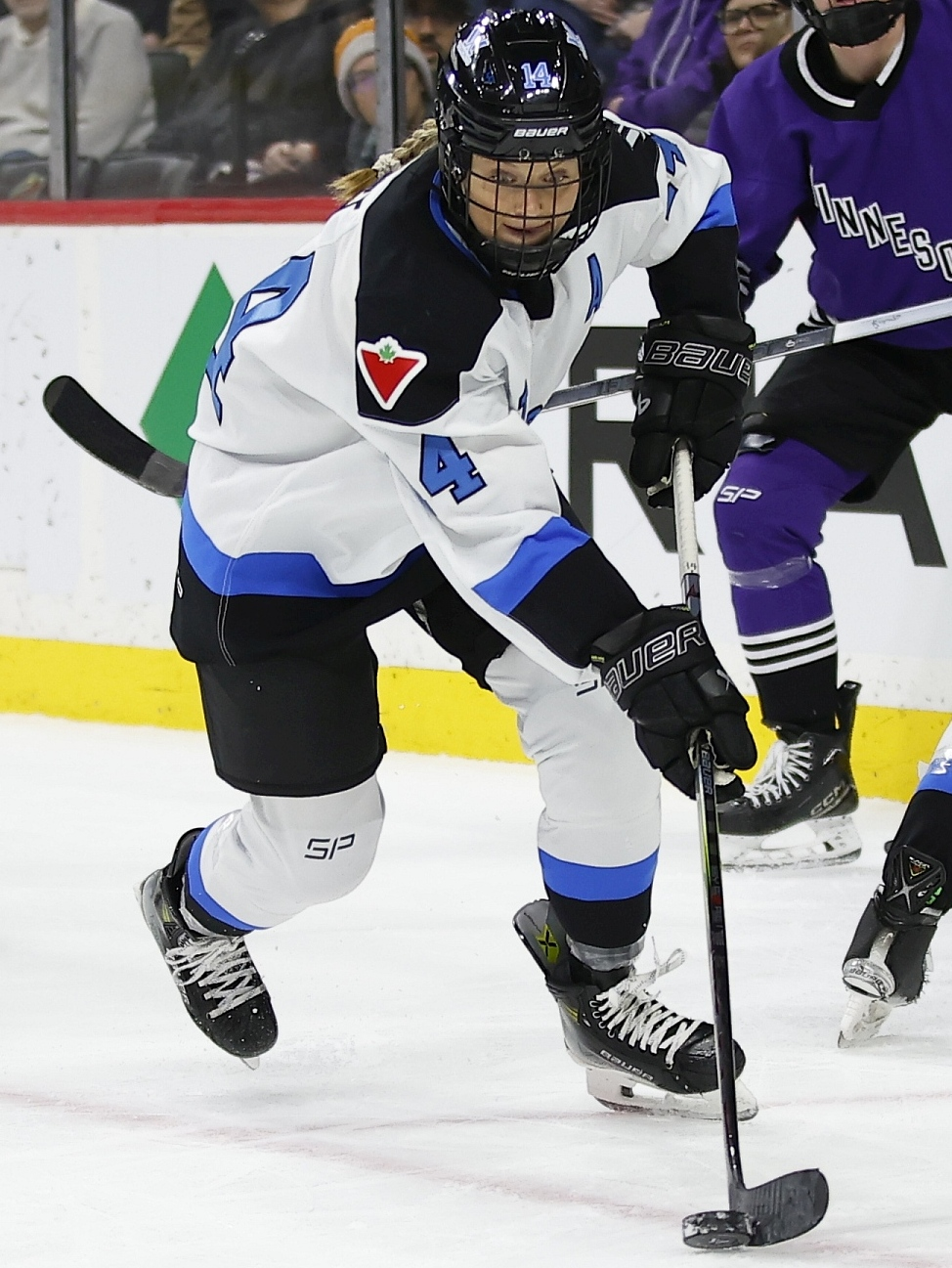
- Fast with the Toronto Sceptres in 2024
- Born: October 6, 1994 (age 32) Hamilton, Ontario, Canada
- Height: 5 ft 6 in (168 cm)
- Weight: 143 lb (65 kg; 10 st 3 lb)
- Position: Defence
- Shoots: Right
- PWHL team Former teams: Toronto Sceptres; Toronto Furies
- National team: Canada
- Playing career: 2010–present
Medal record
Women's ice hockey
Representing Canada
Olympic Games
Gold medal – first place	2022 Beijing	Team
Silver medal – second place	2018 Pyeongchang	Team
Silver medal – second place	2026 Milano Cortina	Team
World Championships
Gold medal – first place	2021 Canada
Gold medal – first place	2022 Denmark
Gold medal – first place	2024 United States
Silver medal – second place	2017 United States
Silver medal – second place	2023 Canada
Silver medal – second place	2025 Czechia
Silver medal – second place	2026 Denmark
Bronze medal – third place	2019 Finland

Renata Fast (born October 6, 1994) is a Canadian professional ice hockey player who is a defender for the Toronto Sceptres of the Professional Women's Hockey League (PWHL) and a member of the Canada women's national ice hockey team. She is a two-time Olympic medallist, having won silver at the 2018 Winter Olympics in PyeongChang and gold at the 2022 Winter Olympics in Beijing. Fast has won seven medals at the IIHF Women's World Championship, including gold medals in 2021, 2022, and 2024. At the 2024 World Championship, she was named Best Defender and selected to the Media All-Star team.

Fast won the 2024–25 PWHL Defender of the Year Award and was named a finalist for the Billie Jean King Most Valuable Player Award after leading the league in assists (16) and time on ice among defencemen. She was also a two-time PWHL All-Star. Previously, she played for the Toronto Furies of the Canadian Women's Hockey League (CWHL), where she was a finalist for Rookie of the Year in 2016–17.

Fast played college ice hockey at Clarkson, where she won the 2014 NCAA National Championship and was named to the Frozen Four All-Tournament Team. She also scored the fastest goal in NCAA Tournament history (10 seconds) in her senior year.

== Early life ==
Fast was born in Hamilton, Ontario and raised in nearby Burlington. She is the youngest of four siblings; her sister is Lindsey Fast, and her brothers are Christopher and Gregory Fast. Her parents are Sharon and Douglas Fast.

Fast began playing hockey in grade two after being encouraged by her childhood friend who lived five houses down the street. She was a multi-sport athlete growing up, excelling in volleyball, basketball, track and field, snowboarding, soccer, and hockey. Fast played for the Burlington Barracudas at various levels from 2003 to 2012, and was named Female Athlete of the Year in the Burlington Junior programs from 2006 to 2011. She won a gold medal with the Barracudas at the Ontario Women's Hockey Association provincials (Peewee AA) in 2007, and captured the 2012 Junior Women's Hockey League Challenge Cup with the Intermediate AA Barracudas.

Fast attended M.M. Robinson High School in Burlington, where she was named MVP for both the hockey and soccer teams. She received athletic scholarship offers from American universities in both sports, ultimately choosing to pursue hockey and accepting a scholarship to Clarkson University.

== Playing career ==
=== Clarkson Golden Knights (2012-16) ===
Fast played four seasons for the Clarkson Golden Knights women's ice hockey team from 2012 to 2016, recording 13 goals and 44 assists for 57 points in 144 games with a +80 plus/minus rating. As a freshman in 2012–13, Fast appeared in all 38 games and helped the Golden Knights reach the NCAA quarterfinals. She was named to the ECAC Hockey All-Academic Team, an honor she would receive in all four years at Clarkson.

In the 2013–14 season, Fast played all 41 games and was instrumental in leading the Golden Knights to their first NCAA Championship, defeating the Minnesota Golden Gophers 5–4 in the title game. The Golden Knights became the first team from outside the Western Collegiate Hockey Association (WCHA) to win the women's national championship. Fast was named to the Frozen Four All-Tournament Team for her defensive play in the championship run. Clarkson also won the ECAC Hockey regular season title with a 16–2–4 conference record. Fast finished the season with 2 goals and 10 assists while posting a +36 plus/minus rating.

In her junior year (2014–15), Fast was named an assistant captain and earned ECAC Hockey First Team All-Star honors after recording 18 points (4 goals, 14 assists) in 29 games despite missing the first nine games due to injury. She tied for fourth in points among ECAC Hockey defensemen and helped Clarkson capture another ECAC Hockey regular season championship with a 15–3–4 record before reaching the NCAA quarterfinals. Fast scored two power-play goals in Clarkson's 4–1 victory over Dartmouth in the ECAC Hockey quarterfinal series.

In her senior season (2015–16), Fast continued as an assistant captain and appeared in 36 games, recording 17 points (5 goals, 12 assists). She scored the fastest goal in NCAA Tournament history, netting the game-winner just 10 seconds into Clarkson's quarterfinal victory over Quinnipiac on March 12, 2016. The Golden Knights advanced to the Frozen Four, where they were eliminated by Boston College 3–2 in overtime in the semifinal.

=== Toronto Furies (2016-19) ===
Fast was selected second overall by the Toronto Furies in the 2016 CWHL Draft. In her rookie season, she competed in 22 of the Furies' 24 games, recording four goals and five assists for nine points with a plus-5 rating. She led all Toronto defencemen in scoring. The Furies finished fourth in the league standings with a 9-13-2 record and advanced to the Clarkson Cup playoffs. Toronto faced the top-seeded Calgary Inferno in the semifinals but lost the best-of-three series. Fast was a finalist for the CWHL's Rookie of the Year and was named a 2016–17 CWHL All-Star.

Fast missed nearly the entire 2017–18 CWHL season due to her selection to Canada's centralization roster in preparation for the 2018 Winter Olympics. The Furies struggled without several key players, finishing with a 9-17-1-1 record, second-to-last in the CWHL standings, and missed the playoffs.

Returning to Toronto for the 2018–19 CWHL season, Fast recorded two goals and six assists in 26 games during the regular season. The Furies clinched the fourth and final playoff spot with a 3–1 victory over the Markham Thunder on February 27, 2019, and faced the first-seeded Calgary Inferno in the semifinals. After Toronto won the opening game 3-1, Calgary responded with consecutive victories to eliminate the Furies from the playoffs. Fast was named to the 2018-19 CWHL All-Star Team. In March 2019, the CWHL announced it would cease operations effective May 1, 2019.

Over three seasons with Toronto, Fast appeared in 48 regular-season games, recording six goals and 11 assists for 17 points.

=== PWHPA (2019–23) ===
Fast was among the over 200 women's hockey players who on May 2, 2019, announced via coordinated social media posts that they would boycott existing North American professional leagues for the 2019–20 season as part of the #ForTheGame movement. On May 20, 2019, the group formed the Professional Women's Hockey Players Association (PWHPA) as a non-profit organization.

Skating for Team Sonnet (Toronto), Fast participated in the PWHPA's "Dream Gap Tour" exhibition series, including the inaugural Toronto showcase in September 2019 and subsequent events across Canada and the United States. She competed in the 2021 Secret Cup, the Canadian leg of the 2020–21 PWHPA Dream Gap Tour in Calgary, where Team Sonnet reached the championship game but fell 4–2 to Team Bauer (Montreal).

Fast continued with Team Sonnet through the 2021–22 season and then joined Team Adidas for the 2022–23 season and the final iteration of the Dream Gap Tour. In May 2022, the PWHPA signed a letter of intent with Billie Jean King Enterprises and the Mark Walter Group to explore a new professional league. The collective bargaining agreement was ratified in July 2023, paving the way for the PWHL.

=== Toronto Sceptres (2023–present) ===
Following the launch of the new Professional Women's Hockey League (PWHL), Fast was one of three players (alongside fellow Canadian Olympians Blayre Turnbull and Sarah Nurse) signed within a pre-draft period to Toronto (later named the Toronto Sceptres) on September 6, 2023, agreeing to a three-year contract. Toronto general manager Gina Kingsbury described the three players as "foundation players" for the franchise, praising Fast for bringing "the whole package" to the organization. In the inaugural 2023–24 season, Fast recorded 3 goals and 11 assists for 14 points in 24 games. Toronto finished first in the standings and advanced to the playoffs, where they faced the Minnesota Frost in the semifinals. Despite taking a 2–0 series lead, Toronto was eliminated after Minnesota won three consecutive games to take the best-of-five series 3–2. Fast was named to the PWHL Second All-Star Team.

External videos
- 2025 PWHL Defender of the Year: Renata Fast, PWHL

In the 2024–25 season, Fast recorded 6 goals and 16 assists for 22 points in 30 games, tying for the league lead in points among defenders. She led the league in assists (16, tied with Sarah Fillier), hits (63), average time on ice (24:39 per game), and cumulative ice time (739:45). Her 13 power-play points set a PWHL single-season record. Fast was named the PWHL Defender of the Year and became the first defender to be nominated for the Billie Jean King Most Valuable Player award. She was also named to the PWHL Second All-Star Team for the second consecutive season. In the 2025 PWHL playoffs, Toronto again faced Minnesota in the semifinals. In Game 1, Fast recorded an assist and tied the PWHL playoff record for most shots in a game by a defender with seven, matching the mark set by Montreal's Kati Tabin. Toronto was eliminated by Minnesota in the best-of-five series.

After the league announced two new expansion teams, Fast was protected by Toronto in the 2025 PWHL Draft. During the 2025-26 PWHL season, she missed two games at the beginning of the season with an upper-body injury, and missed three more games in December because of a lower-body injury.

== International play ==
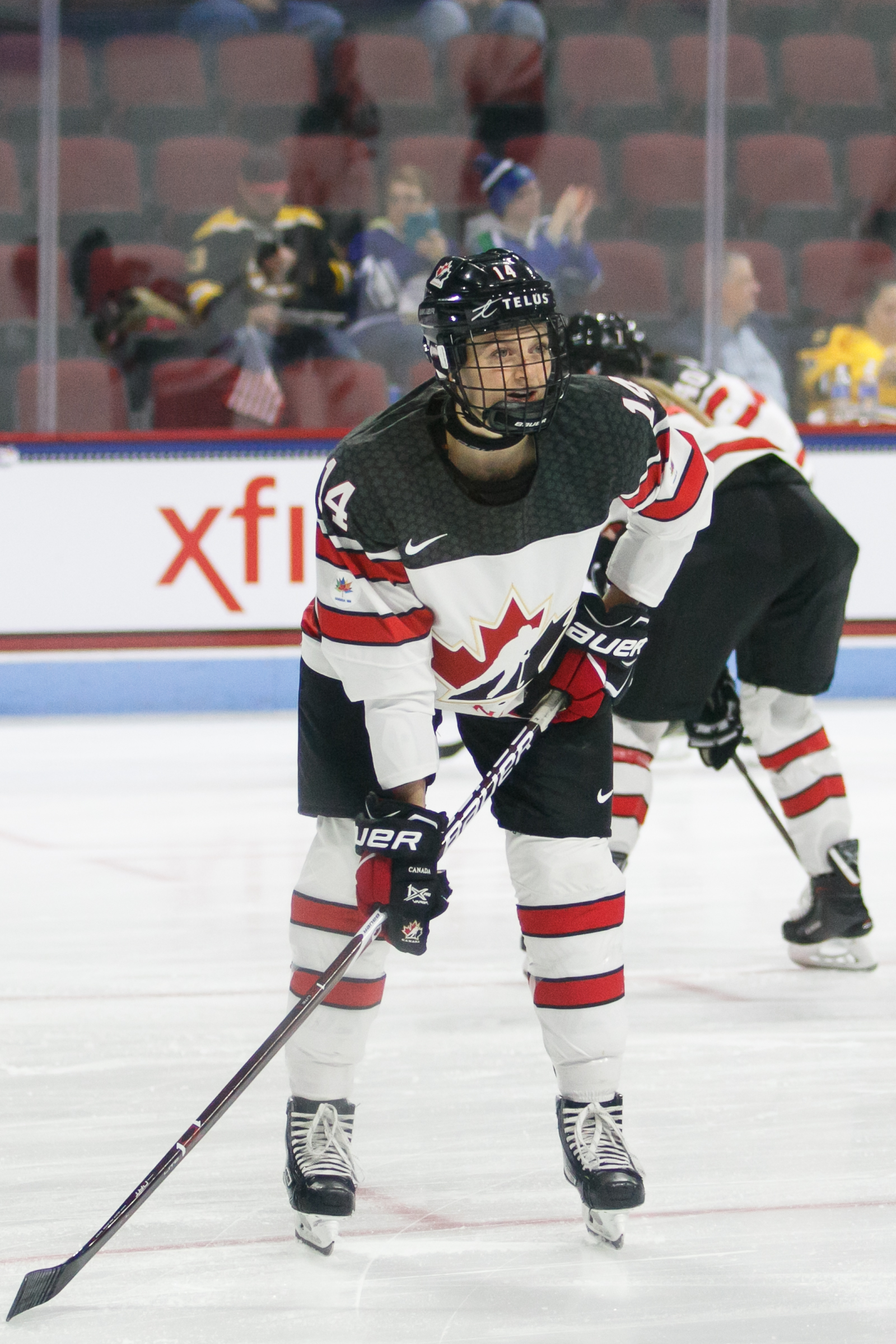
Fast playing for Team Canada in 2017

Fast joined the Canada National Women's Development Team in 2014 and won a gold medal with the team at the 2015 Nations Cup. She made her debut with the senior national team at the 2015 4 Nations Cup in Sundsvall, Sweden where Canada won silver. She went on to represent the Canada women's national ice hockey team at the 2016 4 Nations Cup in Finland, winning silver.

=== World Championships ===
Fast represented Canada at the 2017 IIHF World Championship and helped the team win silver. At the 2019 World Championship, she tied for second in assists (6) as Canada came away with the bronze medal following an upset semifinal loss to Finland.

At the 2021 World Championship, she scored her first world championship goal during Canada's 5-1 round robin win over the United States. She also scored the game winning goal in the semi-final game against Switzerland. Canada defeated Team USA in the final to take home their first world title since 2012.

Fast was part of world championship gold medal performances at the 2022 and 2024 IIHF Women's World Championship. At the 2024 tournament, she was named Best Defender and was selected to the Media All-Star team. She was also a Media All-Star in 2023 and 2025 when Canada won silver medals.

=== Olympics ===
In May 2017, Fast was selected for the centralization roster in preparation for the 2018 Olympic Games in Pyeongchang, South Korea. She was then named to Team Canada for the Olympics, where the team earned a silver medal in a shootout against the United States.

On January 11, 2022, Fast was named to Canada's 2022 Olympic team. Fast scored her first Olympic goal during Canada's semifinal win over Switzerland. She won a gold medal and led the team in minutes played during the tournament, averaging 21:32 per game.

On January 9, 2026, she was named to Canada's roster to compete at the 2026 Winter Olympics in Milan.

== Personal life ==
Fast majored in business at Clarkson. In November 2023, she married Paul Geiger, a financial analyst, whom she met in 2012 at Clarkson.

== Career statistics ==
=== Regular season and playoffs ===
Note: GP = Games played; G = Goals; A = Assists; Pts = Points; PIM = Penalty minutes;

			Regular season					Playoffs
Season	Team	League	GP	G	A	Pts	PIM	GP	G	A	Pts	PIM
2010–11	Burlington Jr. Barracudas	Prov. WHL	36	2	8	10	50	9	1	2	3	18
2011–12	Burlington Jr. Barracudas	Prov. WHL	33	0	12	12	72	6	1	1	2	12
2012–13	Clarkson University	ECAC	38	2	8	10	26	—	—	—	—	—
2013–14	Clarkson University	ECAC	41	2	10	12	44	—	—	—	—	—
2014–15	Clarkson University	ECAC	29	4	14	18	38	—	—	—	—	—
2015–16	Clarkson University	ECAC	36	5	12	17	32	—	—	—	—	—
2016–17	Toronto Furies	CWHL	22	4	5	9	38	—	—	—	—	—
2017–18	Canada	AMHL	15	0	1	1	8	—	—	—	—	—
2017–18	Toronto Furies	CWHL	1	0	0	0	0	—	—	—	—	—
2018–19	Toronto Furies	CWHL	26	2	6	8	48	3	0	0	0	6
2019–20	GTA West	PWHPA	—	—	—	—	—	—	—	—	—	—
2020–21	Toronto	PWHPA	4	0	1	1	6	—	—	—	—	—
2022–23	Team Adidas	PWHPA	20	0	5	5	14	—	—	—	—	—
2023–24	PWHL Toronto	PWHL	24	3	10	13	12	5	0	3	3	4
2024–25	Toronto Sceptres	PWHL	30	6	16	22	36	4	0	2	2	2
2025–26	Toronto Sceptres	PWHL	26	1	9	10	18	—	—	—	—	—
CWHL totals			49	6	11	17	86	3	0	0	0	6
PWHL totals			80	10	35	45	66	7	0	2	2	6

=== International ===
Year	Team	Event	Result	GP	G	A	Pts	PIM
2017	Canada	WC	2nd place, silver medalist(s)	5	0	0	0	0
2018	Canada	OG	2nd place, silver medalist(s)	5	0	0	0	0
2019	Canada	WC	3rd place, bronze medalist(s)	7	0	6	6	4
2021	Canada	WC	1st place, gold medalist(s)	7	2	3	5	8
2022	Canada	OG	1st place, gold medalist(s)	7	1	4	5	8
2022	Canada	WC	1st place, gold medalist(s)	7	0	4	4	4
2023	Canada	WC	2nd place, silver medalist(s)	7	1	4	5	4
2024	Canada	WC	1st place, gold medalist(s)	7	3	3	6	6
2025	Canada	WC	2nd place, silver medalist(s)	7	0	8	8	4
2026	Canada	OG	2nd place, silver medalist(s)	7	0	4	4	2
Senior totals				66	7	36	43	40

== Awards and honours ==
=== NCAA ===
- 2012–2016 – ECAC Hockey All-Academic team
- 2012–13 – Named twice to ECAC Hockey Weekly Honor Roll
- 2013–14 – Frozen Four All-Tournament team
- 2014–15 – First-Team ECAC Hockey All-Star
- 2015–16 – ECAC Hockey Weekly Honor Roll
- 2015–16 – Clarkson's Booster Club's Unsung Hero Award
- 2015–16 – Third-Team ECAC Hockey All-Star
- 2015–16 – Nominee for ECAC Hockey's Student-Athlete of the Year

=== CWHL ===
- 2016–17 – Finalist for CWHL Rookie of the Year
- 2016–17 – CWHL All-Star Game
- 2018–19 – CWHL All-Star Game

=== PWHL ===
- 2023–24 – PWHL Second Team All-Star
- 2024–25 – PWHL First Team All-Star

=== Burlington Sport Alliance ===
- 2017 – Female Athlete of the Year

=== IIHF ===
- 2015 – Gold medal at the 2015 Nations Cup in FÜSSEN, Germany
- 2015 – Silver medal at the 2015 4 Nations Cup in Sundsvall, Sweden
- 2016 – Silver medal at the 2016 4 Nations Cup in Vierumäki, Finland
- 2017 – Silver medal at the 2017 Nations Cup in FÜSSEN, Germany
- 2017 – Silver medal at the 2017 IIHF Women's World Championships in Plymouth, Michigan

=== Olympics ===
- 2018 – Silver medal at the 2018 Winter Olympics in Pyeongchang, South Korea
- 2022 - Gold medal at the 2022 Winter Olympics in Beijing, China
