= Jamie Lee Rattray =

Canadian ice hockey player (born 1992)

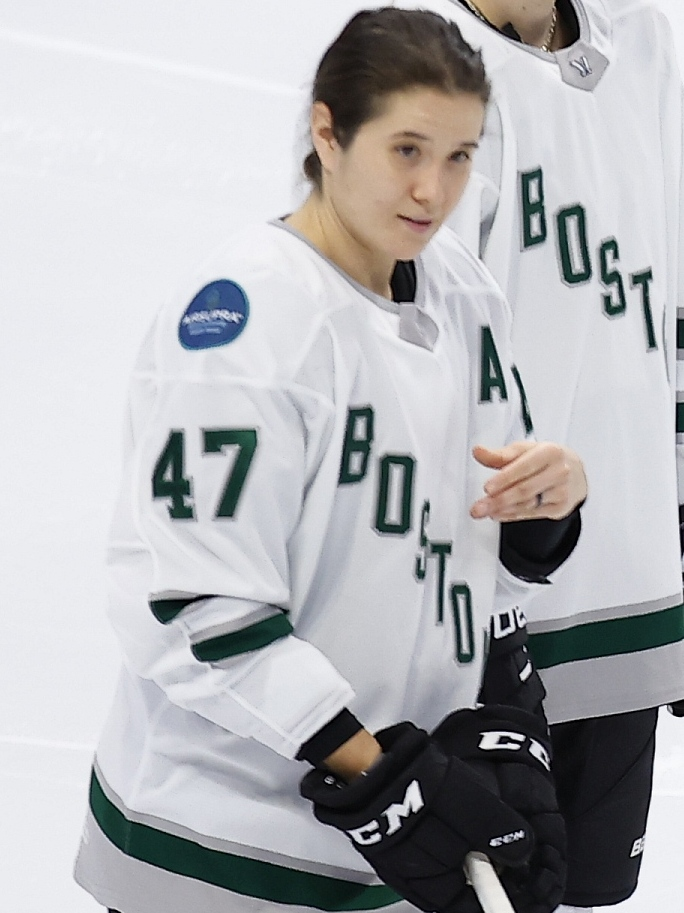
- Rattray with PWHL Boston in 2024
- Born: September 30, 1992 (age 34) Kanata, Ontario, Canada
- Height: 5 ft 6 in (168 cm)
- Weight: 172 lb (78 kg; 12 st 4 lb)
- Position: Forward
- Shoots: Left
- PWHL team Former teams: Toronto Sceptres; Boston Fleet; Markham Thunder; Clarkson Golden Knights
- National team: Canada
- Playing career: 2010–present
Medal record
Women's ice hockey
Representing Canada
Olympic Games
Gold medal – first place	2022 Beijing	Team
World Championships
Gold medal – first place	2021 Canada
Gold medal – first place	2022 Denmark
Gold medal – first place	2024 United States
Silver medal – second place	2015 Sweden
Silver medal – second place	2016 Canada
Silver medal – second place	2023 Canada
Bronze medal – third place	2019 Finland
World U18 Championships
Gold medal – first place	2010 United States
Silver medal – second place	2009 Germany

Jamie-Lee Rattray (born September 30, 1992) is a Canadian (of Métis heritage) professional ice hockey player for the Toronto Sceptres of the Professional Women's Hockey League (PWHL). An Olympic gold medalist from the 2022 Beijing Winter Games, she has won multiple medals with the Canada women's national ice hockey team, including gold medals at the 2021, 2022, and 2024 World Championships.

At the collegiate level, Rattray won the Patty Kazmaier Award as the top player in NCAA women's hockey in 2014, leading the Clarkson Golden Knights to their first national championship. She became Clarkson's all-time leading scorer with 181 points.

In professional hockey, she won the Jayna Hefford Trophy as the Canadian Women's Hockey League's MVP in 2018 and led the Markham Thunder to the 2018 Clarkson Cup championship.

== Early life ==
Rattray was born in Kanata, a suburb at the west end of Ottawa, Ontario to parents Melodie and David. She is of Métis heritage on her mother's side. Rattray began playing hockey at age four, inspired by watching Jayna Hefford score the gold medal-winning goal for Canada against the United States at the 2002 Winter Olympics in Salt Lake City.

Rattray attended Earl of March Secondary School in Kanata, where she was a three-time school athlete of the year. She played for the Kanata Blazers before joining the Ottawa Lady Senators of the Provincial Women's Hockey League in 2006–07. Over four seasons with the Lady Senators, Rattray recorded 111 points (64 goals, 47 assists) in 100 regular-season games and won a league championship in 2009. In her final junior season, 2009–10, she served as team captain and posted 31 goals and 57 points in 34 games. Rattray's performances with the Lady Senators attracted interest from several top NCAA programs, including the University of Minnesota, University of Minnesota Duluth, St. Lawrence University, University of Wisconsin, Mercyhurst University, and Cornell University, ultimately committing to Clarkson University in 2010.

Rattray competed at the National Aboriginal Hockey Championships in Ottawa, Ontario in 2010.

== Playing career ==
=== Clarkson Golden Knights, 2010–2014 ===
External videos
- Clarkson's Jamie Lee Rattray wins 2014 Patty Kazmaier Memorial Award, USA Hockey

Rattray played college ice hockey for the Clarkson Golden Knights from 2010 to 2014. Over four seasons, Rattray became Clarkson's all‑time leading scorer, finishing her collegiate career with 181 points on 77 goals and 104 assists in 147 games, along with a +84 rating, 20 game‑winning goals, 26 power‑play goals, and three hat tricks.

As a freshman in 2010–11, Rattray established herself as one of the team's top offensive players, earning ECAC Hockey Rookie of the Year and Clarkson University Female Rookie of the Year honours her first season. She appeared in all 37 games and led Clarkson in scoring with 25 points, recording 7 goals and a team‑high 18 assists. In 2011–12, her sophomore season, Rattray averaged over a point per game and led the Golden Knights with 19 goals while ranking second on the team with 38 points in 33 games. She tallied six power‑play goals and four game‑winners, posted a +13 plus‑minus rating, and recorded her first career hat trick in a 10–0 win over Rensselaer, adding two goals and an assist the next night against Union to complete a six‑point weekend. She started the season with a six‑game point streak, had 13 multi‑point games, and received the team's Ron Frazer Award as a player who elevated her game in key situations.

As a junior in 2012–13, Rattray was Clarkson's leading offensive player, averaging 1.44 points per game and setting a then‑school single‑season record with 52 points on 22 goals and 30 assists in 36 games. She tied for the national lead with nine game‑winning goals, scored eight power‑play goals and three shorthanded goals, and posted at least one point in each of the final seven games as Clarkson reached the NCAA tournament for the second time. Her season included a hat trick in a 4–1 win at Quinnipiac, the game‑winning goal and an assist the next night at Princeton, and the lone goal in a 1–0 victory at Yale, and she was named a Second‑Team ECAC Hockey All‑Star and repeated as the Ron Frazer Award winner.

In her senior season, Rattray led the NCAA in scoring and was awarded the 2014 Patty Kazmaier Award as the top player in U.S. women's college hockey. She was the first player from Clarkson to win the award. As assistant captain, she played a pivotal leadership role in Clarkson's run to its first NCAA women's hockey championship title in 2014, which was also the first NCAA team championship in Clarkson University history scoring key goals. She was named ECAC Player of the Month three consecutive months from November to January.

=== Brampton/Markham Thunder, 2014–2019 ===
Rattray was selected sixth overall by the Brampton Thunder in the 2014 CWHL Draft. In her rookie season (2014–15), she recorded 4 goals and 9 assists for 13 points in 22 regular-season games. In the third period of an 8–0 win on January 18, 2015, for the Boston Blades over the Brampton Thunder, a fight took place between Boston's Monique Lamoureux and Rattray, as video footage went viral online.

In the 2015–16 season, Rattray had 13 goals and 16 assists for 29 points in 22 games. The Thunder finished third in the standings and advanced to the playoffs, but were defeated by the Calgary Inferno in the semifinals.

During the 2016–17 season, she recorded 11 goals and 10 assists for 21 points in 22 games. Despite finishing third in the standings again, Brampton was defeated by Les Canadiennes de Montreal in the semifinals, with Rattray scoring one of the team's only two goals in the series.

External videos
- 2018 Clarkson Cup Highlights, The CWHL'

After the team relocated to Markham, Ontario and rebranded as the Markham Thunder for the 2017–18 season, Rattray had a breakout season. She led the CWHL with 39 points (22 goals and 17 assists) in 28 games. and was awarded the Jayna Hefford Trophy as the CWHL's most valuable player. In the playoffs, Rattray helped lead the Thunder to the 2018 Clarkson Cup championship, defeating the Kunlun Red Star 2–1 in overtime on March 25, 2018, the franchise's first title.

In 2018–19, her final CWHL season with Markham, Rattray recorded 25 points (12 goals and 13 assists) in 26 games. Across her five CWHL seasons from 2014 to 2019, she played 120 regular-season games and tallied 127 points (62 goals and 65 assists).

=== Professional Women's Hockey Players Association (PWHPA), 2019–2023 ===
Rattray was among the over 200 women's hockey players who announced on May 2, 2019, via coordinated social media posts that they would boycott existing professional leagues in North America for the 2019–20 season as part of the #ForTheGame movement. She publicly supported the initiative, posting on social media that the boycott was about creating "a sustainable future for women's hockey" and committing to the collective effort.

On May 20, 2019, the group formally established the Professional Women's Hockey Players Association (PWHPA) as a non-profit organization. Rattray actively participated in the PWHPA's "Dream Gap Tour" exhibition series, competing in the inaugural Toronto showcase on September 21–22, 2019, and subsequent stops in New Hampshire, Washington, D.C., Buffalo, and other cities.

In the 2021–22 and 2022–23 seasons, Rattray continued her PWHPA participation through showcase games and skills competitions as the organization worked toward establishing a sustainable professional league. In May 2022, the PWHPA signed a letter of intent with Billie Jean King Enterprises and the Mark Walter Group to explore a new professional league. Rattray supported the transition efforts through the PWHPA's final year, participating in final showcases as the organization paved the way for the PWHL. In February 2023, PWHPA players formed the PWHL Players Association (PWHLPA) to negotiate a collective bargaining agreement, which was ratified in July 2023.

=== Boston Fleet, 2023-2026 ===
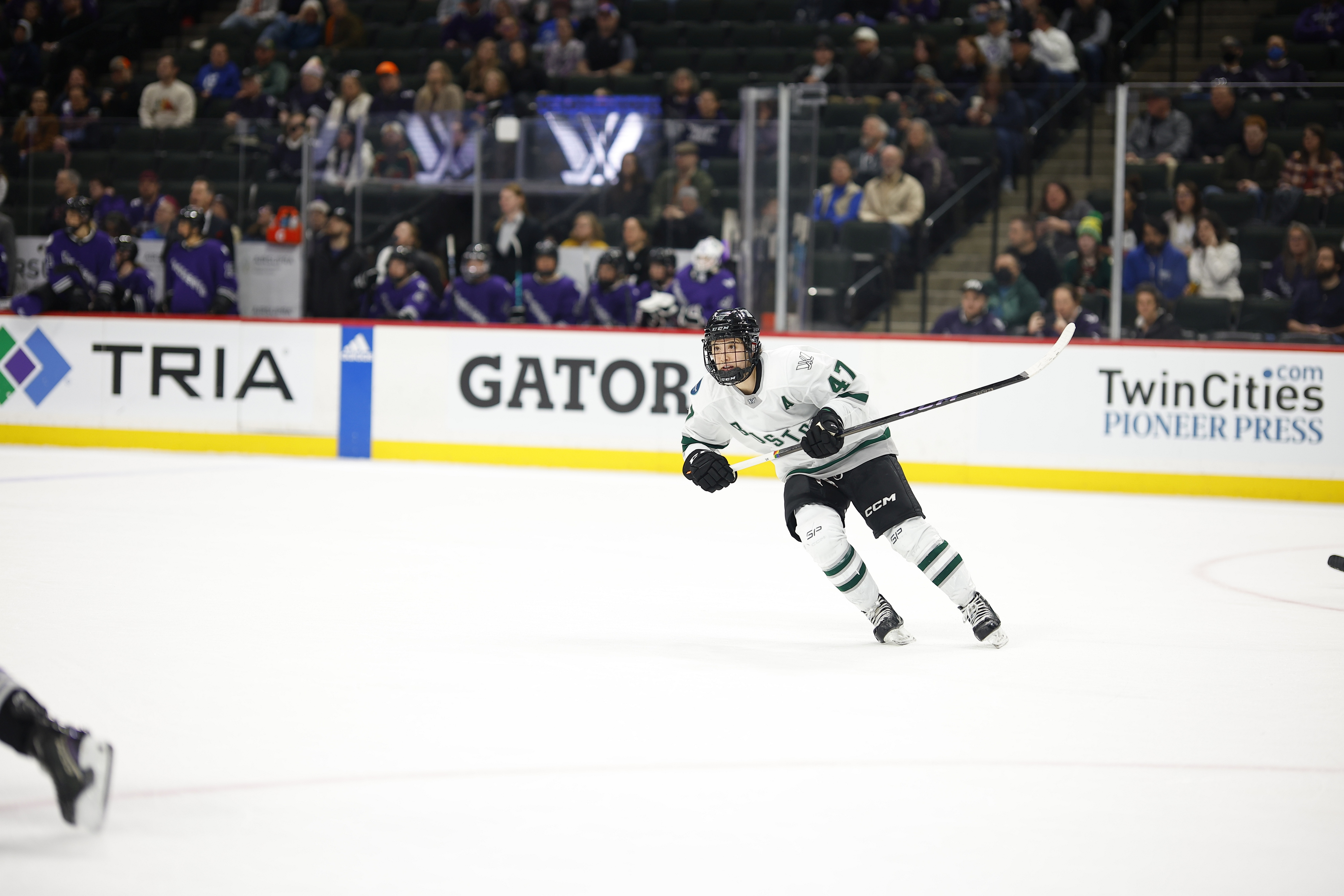
Rattray competing with the Fleet against the Minnesota Frost, March 13, 2024

Rattray was selected 15th overall by PWHL Boston (later re-branded as the Boston Fleet) in the third round of the 2023 PWHL Draft on September 18, 2023. She was named one of the team's assistant captains alongside Megan Keller, with Hilary Knight serving as captain. In the inaugural 2023–24 PWHL season, Rattray recorded 3 goals and 8 assists for 11 points in 24 regular season games. She led the PWHL in faceoff percentage among regulars at 74.1% early in the season, and recorded 2 assists in Boston's first-ever victory on January 13, 2024. She scored her first PWHL goal on January 24, 2024, in her hometown of Ottawa. In a late-season game on April 24, she stripped the puck from an Ottawa defender and beat goaltender Emerance Maschmeyer to score. Boston finished third in the league standings with a record of 12-3-9 and 35 points. In the playoffs, Rattray added 1 assist in 6 games as Boston swept PWHL Montreal in three games in the semifinals, with all three victories coming in overtime, before falling to PWHL Minnesota in five games in the Walter Cup Finals.

In the 2024–25 PWHL season, Rattray recorded 4 goals and 6 assists for 10 points in 30 games. She scored her first goal of the season on December 17, 2024, opening the scoring in a 3–2 victory over Ottawa. Boston finished fifth in the league standings with a record of 9-6-5-10 and 44 points, narrowly missing the playoffs on a tiebreaker. Rattray was awarded the PWHL Intact Impact Award recognizing her leadership, integrity, and commitment to her teammates.

In the 2025–26 PWHL season, Rattray was named an alternate captain for the third consecutive season, alongside Alina Müller, with Megan Keller serving as captain. In the season opener on November 23, 2025, Rattray assisted on Susanna Tapani's goal just 1:13 into the game, helping Boston defeat the Montreal Victoire 2–0. On January 28, 2026, Rattray scored her first career power-play goal in her 68th career regular-season game during a 4–3 shootout victory over the New York Sirens.

=== Toronto Sceptres, 2026–present ===
On June 20, 2026, Rattray was signed to a two-year contract by the Toronto Sceptres.

== International play ==
=== Youth ===
In April 2010, Rattray was part of the Canadian Under-18 squad that captured gold at the IIHF U18 Women's World Championship. To celebrate the gold medal win, she participated in the Canada Celebrates Event on June 30 in Edmonton, Alberta, which recognized the Canadian Olympic and World hockey champions from the 2009–10 season . Rattray was the top scorer (3 goals, 3 assists, 6 points) for Canada at the 2012 Meco Cup.

=== Senior ===
==== Ice hockey ====
Rattray made her debut with the Canada women's national ice hockey team at the 2014 4 Nations Cup, where Canada won the gold medal.

===== World Championships =====
Rattray competed at the IIHF Women's World Championship in 2015, winning the first of two straight silver medals. She competed in one game at the 2016 IIHF Women's World Championship, as Canada earned another silver medal. She also competed at the 2016 4 Nations Cup, earning a silver medal.

After not being named to the rosters for the 2017 World Championship or the 2018 Winter Olympics in PyeongChang, she returned to the national team for the 2018 4 Nations Cup, winning a silver medal.

At the 2019 IIHF Women's World Championship, Rattray had a breakthrough performance, recording three goals and three assists for six points in seven games as Canada won the bronze medal after an upset loss to Finland in the semifinals. Rattray was named to Team Canada for the 2020 IIHF Women's World Championship, which was cancelled because of the COVID-19 pandemic.

At the 2021 IIHF Women's World Championship, Rattray scored four goals to help Canada win its first world title since 2012. Rattray continued with the national team, winning gold at the 2022 IIHF Women's World Championship, silver at the 2023 IIHF Women's World Championship, and gold at the 2024 IIHF Women's World Championship.

===== Olympics =====
On January 11, 2022, Rattray was named to Canada's 2022 Olympic team. In her Olympic debut at Beijing 2022, Rattray recorded five goals and four assists in seven games as Canada won the gold medal.

==== Ball hockey ====
Rattray was also a member of the Canada women's national ball hockey team that competed at the 2017 Ball Hockey World Championship in Pardubice, Czech Republic. She would emerge with a bronze medal while capturing the tournament-scoring title.

== Personal life ==
Rattray graduated from Clarkson University in 2014 with a degree in business administration and management. She is a lesbian and married her long time girlfriend Whitney on August 10, 2024. They have one son named Cooper.

== Sponsorships and endorsements ==
In 2024, Rattray partnered with Canadian lifestyle and apparel company Team LTD to launch a personal merchandise line featuring a custom “Rat” logo, becoming one of the first PWHL players to introduce a dedicated branded collection. In media appearances promoting the collaboration, she described the line as a way to build visibility for women's hockey and to connect with fans through off‑ice branding.

Rattray has also been featured in marketing campaigns for Scotiabank, appearing among the players highlighted in promotional materials supporting the women's game.

== In popular culture ==
As a member of the gold medal-winning squad at the 2010 IIHF World Women's U18 Championship, a hockey card of Rattray was featured in the Upper Deck 2010 World of Sports card series. In 2023, she was honoured with the APTN Bryan Trottier Award from the Aboriginal Sports and Wellness Council of Canada.

== Career stats ==
Note: GP = Games played; G = Goals; A = Assists; Pts = Points; PIM = Penalty minutes;

			Regular season					Playoffs
Season	Team	League	GP	G	A	Pts	PIM	GP	G	A	Pts	PIM
2010–11	Clarkson Golden Knights	ECAC	37	7	18	25	26	—	—	—	—	—
2011–12	Clarkson Golden Knights	ECAC	33	19	19	38	14	—	—	—	—	—
2012–13	Clarkson Golden Knights	ECAC	36	22	30	52	52	—	—	—	—	—
2013–14	Clarkson Golden Knights	ECAC	41	29	37	66	53	—	—	—	—	—
2014–15	Brampton Thunder	CWHL	22	4	9	13	37	0	0	0	0	0
2015–16	Brampton Thunder	CWHL	22	13	16	29	18	2	0	1	1	0
2016–17	Brampton Thunder	CWHL	22	11	10	21	28	0	0	0	0	0
2017–18	Markham Thunder	CWHL	28	22	17	39	22	3	2	0	2	2
2018–19	Markham Thunder	CWHL	26	12	13	25	14	3	0	1	1	2
2020–21	Toronto	PWHPA	4	4	0	4	4	—	—	—	—	—
2022–23	Team Harvey's	PWHPA	20	11	5	16	6	—	—	—	—	—
2023–24	PWHL Boston	PWHL	24	3	8	11	8	6	0	1	1	4
2024–25	Boston Fleet	PWHL	30	4	6	10	8	—	—	—	—	—
CWHL totals			120	62	65	127	119	8	2	2	4	4
PWHPA totals			24	15	5	20	10	—	—	—	—	—
PWHL totals			54	5	9	14	16	6	0	1	1	4

=== Hockey Canada ===
Note: GP = Games played; G = Goals; A = Assists; Pts = Points; PIM = Penalty minutes;

				Regular season
Year	Team	Event	Result	GP	G	A	Pts	PIM
2009	Canada	U18	2nd place, silver medalist(s)	5	5	0	5	4
2010	Canada	U18	1st place, gold medalist(s)	5	2	6	8	6
2015	Canada	WC	2nd place, silver medalist(s)	5	0	0	0	0
2016	Canada	WC	2nd place, silver medalist(s)	1	0	0	0	2
2019	Canada	WC	2nd place, silver medalist(s)	7	3	3	6	2
2021	Canada	WC	1st place, gold medalist(s)	7	4	1	5	2
2022	Canada	OG	1st place, gold medalist(s)	7	5	4	9	0
2022	Canada	WC	1st place, gold medalist(s)	6	1	0	1	2
2023	Canada	WC	2nd place, silver medalist(s)	7	1	3	4	2
2024	Canada	WC	1st place, gold medalist(s)	7	0	2	2	2
Junior totals				10	7	6	13	10
Senior totals				47	14	13	27	12

== Awards and honours ==
=== NCAA ===
- 2011–2012 Ron Frazier Award
- 2010–2011 Clarkson University Female Rookie of the Year
- 2014 Patty Kazmaier Award
- 2014 ECAC Hockey Player of the Year Award
- 2014 ECAC Hockey First-Team Selection
- 2013–14 NCAA scoring champion
- 2014 NCAA Champion with Clarkson Golden Knights
- ECAC Player of the Month (Month of October 2011)
- ECAC Player of the Week (Week of October 25, 2012)
- ECAC Player of the week (Week of November 18, 2013)
- ECAC Player of the Month (November 2013)

=== CWHL ===
with Brampton / Markham Thunder

- 2018 Clarkson Cup Champion
- 2018 Jayna Hefford Trophy
- 2016–17 CWHL All-Star
- 2015–16 CWHL All-Star
- 2014–15 CWHL All-Star

=== PWHL ===
- 2025 PWHL Intact Impact Award

=== Ball hockey ===
- 2015 CBHA Nationals, Most Valuable Forward
- 2015 CBHA Nationals, Top Scorer
- 2017 ISBHF World Championships, Leading Scorer

Awards and achievements
Preceded by Amanda Kessel	Patty Kazmaier Award; 2013–14	Succeeded by Alex Carpenter
