= Emerance Maschmeyer =

Canadian ice hockey player (born 1994)

Emerance Maschmeyer-Lacasse
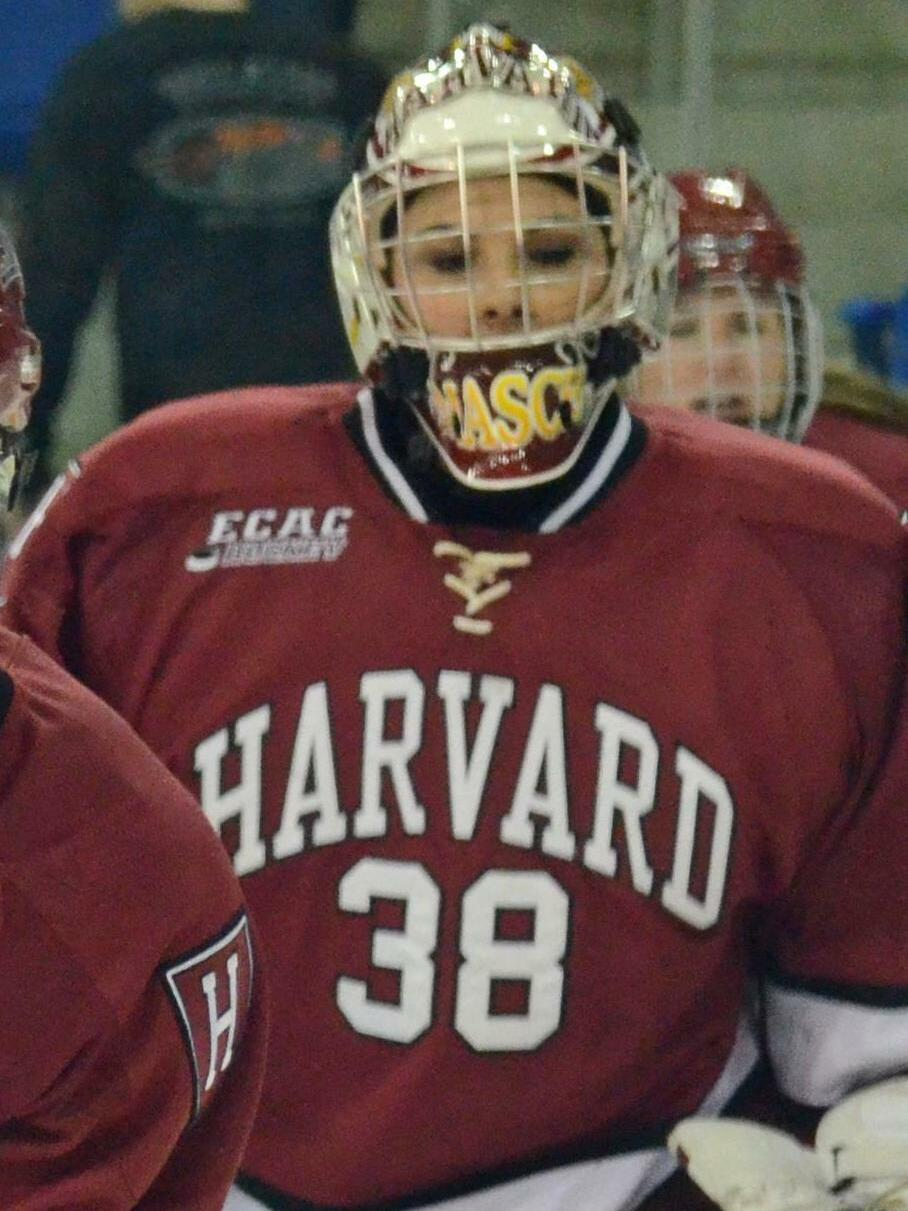
- Maschmeyer with the Harvard Crimson in 2014
- Born: October 5, 1994 (age 32) Bruderheim, Alberta, Canada
- Height: 5 ft 6 in (168 cm)
- Weight: 141 lb (64 kg; 10 st 1 lb)
- Position: Goaltender
- Catches: Left
- PWHL team Former teams: Vancouver Goldeneyes; Ottawa Charge; Les Canadiennes de Montréal; Calgary Inferno
- National team: Canada
- Playing career: 2012–present
Medal record
Representing Canada
Women's ice hockey
Olympic Games
| Gold medal – first place | 2022 Beijing | Team |
| Silver medal – second place | 2026 Milano Cortina | Team |
World Championships
| Gold medal – first place | 2021 Canada |
| Gold medal – first place | 2022 Denmark |
| Gold medal – first place | 2024 United States |
| Silver medal – second place | 2015 Sweden |
| Silver medal – second place | 2016 Canada |
| Silver medal – second place | 2017 United States |
| Silver medal – second place | 2023 Canada |
| Bronze medal – third place | 2019 Finland |
World U18 Championships
| Gold medal – first place | 2012 Czech Republic |

Emerance Maschmeyer-Lacasse (born October 5, 1994) is a Canadian professional ice hockey goaltender for the Vancouver Goldeneyes of the Professional Women's Hockey League (PWHL). She previously played for the Ottawa Charge of the PWHL. She is also a member of Canada women's national ice hockey team, with whom she won the gold medal at the 2021 IIHF Women's World Championship and the 2022 Winter Olympics. She first made her debut with Team Canada at the 2014 4 Nations Cup.

== Playing career ==
Maschmeyer was the second female goaltender to compete in the Brick Invitational Hockey Tournament in Edmonton. A meeting was set up at the tournament for her to meet Shannon Szabados, and since then, the two have stayed in contact. She played against her brother Brock, who played for the Fort McMurray Oil Barons, and stopped him in a shootout. Maschmeyer played two exhibition games during the 2010–11 season with the Lloydminster Bobcats of the AJHL. In an exhibition game versus the Camrose Kodiaks, Maschmeyer posted no goals against and was named game star.

=== Hockey Canada ===
Maschmeyer won a gold medal with Team Alberta at the 2011 Canada Winter Games. In addition, she claimed gold at the 2009 Alberta Winter Games.

=== NCAA ===
Maschmeyer's college ice hockey career was played with the Harvard Crimson women's ice hockey program in the ECAC Hockey and Ivy League conferences of the NCAA Division I during 2012 to 2016. Maschmeyer made 29 saves for Harvard in the championship game of the 2015 NCAA National Collegiate Women's Ice Hockey Tournament.

=== Professional career ===
In the 2015 NWHL Draft, she was selected by the Boston Pride. In April 2016, she registered for the 2016 CWHL Draft and ended up becoming the Calgary Inferno's first-round pick.

Winning the starting goaltender duties, Maschmeyer earned a spot in the 3rd Canadian Women's Hockey League All-Star Game. In addition, she started the game for Calgary in the 2017 Clarkson Cup finals against Les Canadiennes de Montréal.

Following her release from Canada's Centralization Camp in preparation for the 2018 Winter Games, Maschmeyer was traded to Les Canadiennes, becoming their starting goaltender. Erin Ambrose, who had also been released from Centralization, joined Maschmeyer in Montreal, having been traded from the Toronto Furies.

In the 2018–19 season, Maschmeyer gained the second All-Star selection of her career, playing with Alex Rigsby for Team Purple in the 4th Canadian Women's Hockey League All-Star Game. Coincidentally, the two played against each other in the 2019 Clarkson Cup Finals, with Rigsby as the starter for the Calgary Inferno, Maschmeyer's former club. Calgary defeated Montreal, 5–2.

Following the rival Professional Women's Hockey Players Association and Premier Hockey Federation consolidating into the new Professional Women's Hockey League in 2023, Maschmeyer was one of three initial free agent signings made by PWHL Ottawa. She and fellow Team Canada members Emily Clark and Brianne Jenner were the first players announced by any team in the league.

During the league's expansion to eight teams ahead of the 2025–26 season, Maschmeyer was left unprotected by the Charge and signed a two-year contract with the Vancouver Goldeneyes on June 5, 2025.

== International play ==
She earned a shutout for Team Canada in the gold medal game at the 2012 IIHF World Women's U18 Championship, a 3–0 triumph over the United States.

Maschmeyer competed for the Canadian national under-22 team that participated at the 2017 Nations Cup. In the gold medal game against Finland, Maschmeyer made 17 saves as Canada lost to Finland by a 1–0 tally.

Maschmeyer represented Canada at three consecutive IIHF World Championship tournaments, in 2015, 2016, and 2017. Canada earned silver medals at all three tournaments.

On January 11, 2022, Maschmeyer was named to the Canadian delegation for the 2022 Winter Olympics in Beijing.

On January 9, 2026, she was named to Canada's roster to compete at the 2026 Winter Olympics.

== Personal life ==
Maschmeyer married former Team Canada goaltending teammate Geneviève Lacasse in 2023. On September 8, 2024, Lacasse and Maschmeyer had their first child, a son named Beckham.

== Career statistics ==
=== Regular season and playoffs ===
| | | | Regular season | | | | | | | | | Playoffs |
| Season | Team | League | GP | W | L | OTL | MIN | GA | SO | GAA | SV% | GP | W | L | MIN | GA | SO | GAA | SV% |
|---|---|---|---|---|---|---|---|---|---|---|---|---|---|---|---|---|---|---|---|
| 2008–09 | Fort Saskatchewan Rangers U15 AAA | AMBHL | 20 | – | – | – | – | – | – | 2.88 | .919 | – | – | – | – | – | – | – | – |
| 2009–10 | Fort Saskatchewan Rangers U16 AAA | AMMHL | 22 | – | – | – | – | – | – | 3.66 | .912 | – | – | – | – | – | – | 6.00 | .820 |
| 2010–11 | Fort Saskatchewan Rangers U18 AAA | AMHL | 19 | – | – | – | – | – | – | 3.66 | .899 | – | – | – | – | – | – | – | – |
| 2011–12 | Lloydminster Bobcats | AJHL | 7 | – | – | – | – | – | – | 4.24 | .811 | – | – | – | – | – | – | – | – |
| 2012–13 | Harvard Crimson | ECAC | 20 | 12 | 6 | 2 | 1165:01 | 28 | 5 | 1.44 | .935 | – | – | – | – | – | – | – | – |
| 2013–14 | Harvard Crimson | ECAC | 27 | 16 | 6 | 4 | 1641:20 | 48 | 4 | 1.75 | .943 | – | – | – | – | – | – | – | – |
| 2014–15 | Harvard Crimson | ECAC | 26 | 18 | 5 | 3 | 1503:08 | 37 | 3 | 1.48 | .943 | – | – | – | – | – | – | – | – |
| 2015–16 | Harvard Crimson | ECAC | 26 | 13 | 12 | 1 | 1543:05 | 48 | 5 | 1.87 | .938 | – | – | – | – | – | – | – | – |
| 2016–17 | Calgary Inferno | CWHL | 8 | 5 | 3 | 0 | 484:17 | 12 | 2 | 1.49 | .946 | – | – | – | – | – | – | – | – |
| 2017–18 | Les Canadiennes de Montréal | CWHL | 23 | 18 | 4 | 1 | 1380:14 | 41 | 6 | 1.78 | .920 | 2 | 0 | 2 | 125:25 | 5 | 0 | 2.39 | .906 |
| 2018–19 | Les Canadiennes de Montréal | CWHL | 20 | 15 | 4 | 1 | 1199:46 | 29 | 4 | 1.45 | .935 | 4 | 2 | 1 | 237:00 | 8 | 2 | 4.06 | .900 |
| 2020–21 | Team Bauer | PWHPA | 1 | 1 | 0 | 0 | 60:00 | 1 | 0 | 1.00 | .968 | – | – | – | – | – | – | – | – |
| 2022–23 | Team Scotiabank | PWHPA | 10 | 3 | 0 | 0 | 445:00 | 21 | 0 | 2.83 | .922 | – | – | – | – | – | – | – | – |
| 2023–24 | PWHL Ottawa | PWHL | 23 | 9 | 9 | 4 | 1332:07 | 51 | 2 | 2.30 | .915 | – | – | – | – | – | – | – |
| 2024–25 | Ottawa Charge | PWHL | 18 | 6 | 7 | 2 | 1000:00 | 43 | 0 | 2.58 | .913 | – | – | – | – | – | – | – | – |
| PWHL totals | | | 41 | 15 | 16 | 6 | 2332 | 94 | 2 | 2.42 | .914 | — | — | — | — | — | — | — | — |

=== International ===
Note: GP = Games played; Min, TOI = Minutes played; W = Wins; L = Losses; T,T/OT = Ties; OTL = Overtime losses; GA = Goals-against; GAA = Goals-against average; SO = Shutouts; SV% = Save percentage;

| | | | | Regular season |
| Year | Team | Event | Result | GP | W | L | T/OT | MIN | GA | SO | GAA | SV% |
|---|---|---|---|---|---|---|---|---|---|---|---|---|
| 2012 | Canada | U18 | 1st place, gold medalist(s) | 2 | 3 | 0 | 0 | 180:00 | 1 | 2 | 0.33 | .984 |
| 2015 | Canada | WC | 2nd place, silver medalist(s) | — | — | — | — | — | — | — | — | — |
| 2016 | Canada | WC | 2nd place, silver medalist(s) | 3 | 2 | 1 | 1 | 191:23 | 4 | 0 | 1.25 | .956 |
| 2017 | Canada | WC | 2nd place, silver medalist(s) | 1 | 0 | 0 | 0 | 27:19 | 3 | 0 | 6.59 | .727 |
| 2019 | Canada | WC | 3rd place, bronze medalist(s) | 2 | 1 | 1 | 0 | 118:43 | 3 | 1 | 1.52 | .923 |
| 2021 | Canada | WC | 1st place, gold medalist(s) | 2 | 2 | 0 | 0 | 120:00 | 0 | 2 | 0.00 | 1.000 |
| 2022 | Canada | OG | 1st place, gold medalist(s) | 2 | 2 | 0 | 0 | 120:00 | 1 | 1 | 0.50 | .957 |
| 2022 | Canada | WC | 1st place, gold medalist(s) | 2 | 1 | 1 | 0 | 119:05 | 4 | 1 | 2.02 | .892 |
| 2023 | Canada | WC | 2nd place, silver medalist(s) | 2 | 2 | 0 | 0 | 124:26 | 2 | 1 | 0.96 | .920 |
| 2024 | Canada | WC | 1st place, gold medalist(s) | 2 | 2 | 0 | 0 | 120:00 | 1 | 1 | 0.50 | .971 |
| 2026 | Canada | OG | 2nd place, silver medalist(s) | 3 | 2 | 1 | 0 | 128:07 | 1 | 1 | 0.47 | .957 |
| Junior totals | | | | 2 | 3 | 0 | 0 | 180:00 | 1 | 2 | 0.33 | .984 |
| Senior totals | | | | 19 | 14 | 4 | 1 | | 19 | 8 |

== Awards and honours ==
- Nominee, Fort Saskatchewan (AMHL) Most Valuable Player
- Gold In The Net Athlete of the Month, January 2011
- Fort Saskatchewan (Bantam AAA Boys) All-Star Team (2008–09)
- Fort Saskatchewan (Bantam AA Boys) All-Star Team (2007–08)

=== CWHL ===
- Finalist, 2018–19 CWHL Goaltender of the Year Award
- Finalist, 2018–19 Jayna Hefford Trophy
