= Rebecca Johnston =

Canadian ice hockey player (born 1989)

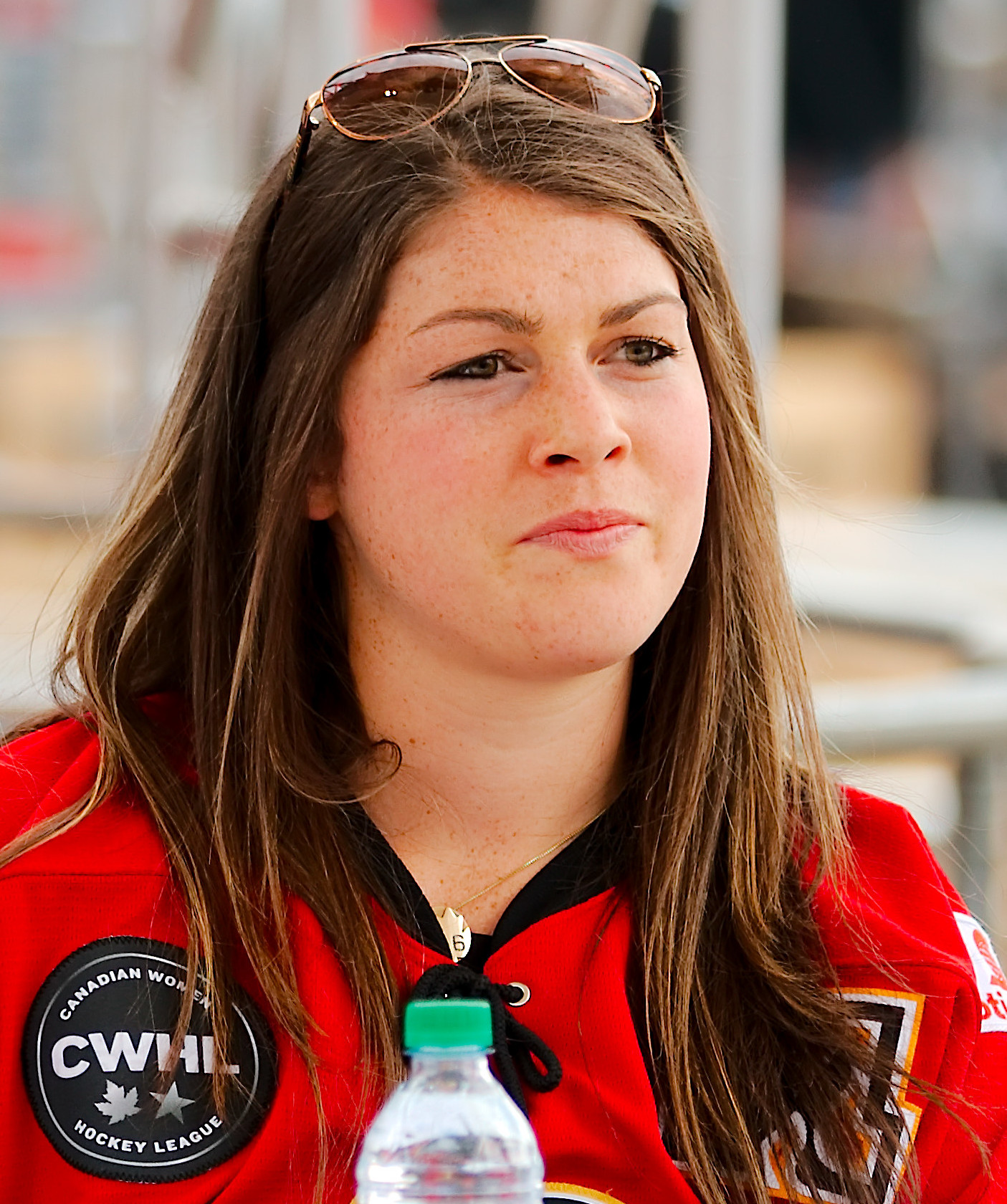
- Johnston in 2016
- Born: September 24, 1989 (age 37) Sudbury, Ontario, Canada
- Height: 5 ft 9 in (175 cm)
- Weight: 148 lb (67 kg; 10 st 8 lb)
- Position: Forward
- Shot: Left
- Played for: Team Scotiabank; PWHPA Calgary; Calgary Inferno; Toronto Furies; Cornell Big Red
- National team: Canada
- Playing career: 2007–2025
Medal record
Women's ice hockey
Representing Canada
Olympic Games
Gold medal – first place	2010 Vancouver	Team
Gold medal – first place	2014 Sochi	Team
Gold medal – first place	2022 Beijing	Team
Silver medal – second place	2018 Pyeongchang	Team
World Championships
Gold medal – first place	2012 United States
Gold medal – first place	2021 Canada
Silver medal – second place	2008 China
Silver medal – second place	2009 Finland
Silver medal – second place	2011 Switzerland
Silver medal – second place	2013 Canada
Silver medal – second place	2015 Sweden
Silver medal – second place	2016 Canada
Silver medal – second place	2017 United States
Silver medal – second place	2023 Canada
Bronze medal – third place	2019 Finland

Rebecca Anne Johnston (born September 24, 1989) is a retired Canadian ice hockey player who played for the Calgary Inferno of the Canadian Women's Hockey League and later the Calgary section of the Professional Women's Hockey Players Association. Johnston was a member of the Canadian national team from 2007 to 2023. She played four seasons with the Cornell Big Red and was selected second overall in the 2012 CWHL Draft by the Toronto Furies. She has three Winter Olympic gold medals, one silver, and two world championship titles.

== Playing career ==
=== Canada Winter Games ===
Johnston (and future Cornell teammate Catherine White) represented Ontario at the 2007 Canada Winter Games. In the gold medal match versus Manitoba, Johnston and White each had one goal and two assists, as Ontario won by a score of 6–3 and finished the tournament undefeated. In a game versus Newfoundland at the Canada Winter Games (March 5, 2007), Johnston was on a line with Mallory Deluce and Jenn Wakefield. The three combined for 12 points in a 19–0 victory.

=== Cornell University ===
Johnston was Cornell's first player to be named first-team ECAC Hockey and receive rookie of the year honours. She was also named first-team All-Ivy and Ivy League Rookie of the Year. In the 2008–09 season, Johnston's 37-point total (by mid-February) was the most points in a season for Cornell since the 1991–92 campaign (Kim Ratushny with 21 goals and 17 assists). Johnston's 37-point total in mid-February led the entire ECAC league in overall points. She was also second in the league and sixth in the NCAA in points per game with 1.85. She was selected for membership in the Quill and Dagger society.

=== Hockey Canada ===
Johnston won two gold medals with the National Women's Under-22 Team at the Air Canada Cup. Rebecca made her debut at the 2008 IIHF World Women's Championship, playing in all five games as Canada won silver. Rebecca Johnston was a member of Canada's Under-22 Team. The U-22 participated in the MLP Cup, held in Ravensburg, Germany, from Jan. 2–6, 2009. Johnston was part of the silver medal-winning team. In the tournament, Johnston accumulated seven points (3 goals, 4 assists). Her best game was in an 11–0 victory over Russia. Johnston scored a hat trick and added an assist. In addition to the MLP Cup, Johnston played with the Canadian Senior Team in the Four Nations Cup between November 4 and 9, 2009. Johnston was part of the silver medal-winning team. In the gold medal game of the 2010 Four Nations Cup, Rebecca Johnston's second goal of the game clinched the gold medal for Canada. Said goal came on a power play 6:21 into overtime. The goal gave Canada a 3–2 win over the United States. It was Hockey Canada's 12th championship in the tournament's 15-year history. She would lead all Canadian scorers in the tournament with four goals. In a game versus Russia at the 2012 IIHF Women's World Championship, Johnston registered a five-point game (one goal, four assists) in a 14–1 victory. In December 2013, Johnston was named to 2014 Olympic roster for Canada.

On January 11, 2022, Johnston was named to Canada's 2022 Olympic team for the Beijing Winter Olympics, where she won her third Olympic gold medal.

=== CWHL ===
In her first season with the Calgary Inferno, Johnston broke Danny Stone's franchise record for most points scored in one season. In addition, she clinched the Angela James Bowl, awarded to the league's scoring leader.

Johnston helped the Calgary Inferno capture their first-ever Clarkson Cup championship in 2016. Contested at Ottawa's Canadian Tire Centre, she scored twice in an 8–3 victory over Les Canadiennes de Montreal.

During the final year of the CWHL, Johnston was named captain of the Inferno.

=== PWHPA ===
Following the Collapse of the Canadian Women's Hockey League, Johnston joined 200 other players to campaign for a unified professional women's league. Johnston played for the Calgary branch of the PWHPA, later called Team Scotiabank.

== Retirement ==
Johnston announced her retirement from the Canadian national team on September 25, 2025. She last competed in the 2023 IIHF Women's World Championship, earning a silver medal with Canada. Johnston now works as a development coach for the Calgary Flames of the NHL.

== Personal life ==
Johnston's brother is professional ice hockey defenceman Ryan Johnston.

== Career statistics ==
=== Regular season and playoffs ===
			Regular season					Playoffs
Season	Team	League	GP	G	A	Pts	PIM	GP	G	A	Pts	PIM
2007–08	Cornell University	ECAC	26	16	16	32	12	—	—	—	—	—
2008–09	Cornell University	ECAC	26	25	20	45	16	—	—	—	—	—
2010–11	Cornell University	ECAC	33	26	24	50	8	—	—	—	—	—
2011–12	Cornell University	ECAC	34	30	31	61	12	—	—	—	—	—
2012–13	Toronto Furies	CWHL	24	8	17	25	4	3	2	0	2	2
2014–15	Calgary Inferno	CWHL	24	17	20	37	10	2	0	0	0	0
2015–16	Calgary Inferno	CWHL	4	4	2	6	2	3	4	4	8	2
2016–17	Calgary Inferno	CWHL	20	7	15	22	2	—	—	—	—	—
2017–18	Calgary Inferno	CWHL	—	—	—	—	—	—	—	—	—	—
2018–19	Calgary Inferno	CWHL	27	15	24	39	8	4	2	2	4	0
2019–20	Calgary	PWHPA	—	—	—	—	—	—	—	—	—	—
2020–21	Calgary	PWHPA	—	—	—	—	—	—	—	—	—	—
CWHL totals			99	51	78	129	26	12	8	6	14	4

=== International ===
Year	Team	Event	Result	GP	G	A	Pts	PIM
2008	Canada	WC	2nd place, silver medalist(s)	5	0	0	0	0
2009	Canada	WC	2nd place, silver medalist(s)	5	3	2	5	0
2010	Canada	OG	1st place, gold medalist(s)	5	1	5	6	2
2011	Canada	WC	2nd place, silver medalist(s)	5	4	2	6	0
2012	Canada	WC	1st place, gold medalist(s)	5	1	6	7	0
2013	Canada	WC	2nd place, silver medalist(s)	5	3	2	5	2
2014	Canada	OG	1st place, gold medalist(s)	5	2	3	5	2
2015	Canada	WC	2nd place, silver medalist(s)	5	2	3	5	0
2016	Canada	WC	2nd place, silver medalist(s)	5	2	5	7	0
2017	Canada	WC	2nd place, silver medalist(s)	5	2	3	5	2
2018	Canada	OG	2nd place, silver medalist(s)	5	3	2	5	2
2019	Canada	WC	3rd place, bronze medalist(s)	7	3	1	4	2
2021	Canada	WC	1st place, gold medalist(s)	7	2	0	2	2
2022	Canada	OG	1st place, gold medalist(s)	7	2	8	10	2
Senior totals				76	30	42	72	16

== Awards and honours ==
=== NCAA ===
- 2008 ECAC Women's Hockey Preseason All-League team
- First Team All-Ivy League, 2007–08, Forward
- Ivy League Rookie of the Year 2007–08, Unanimous selection
- First-team ECAC Hockey (2008)
- ECAC rookie of the year honour (2008)
- 2009 First Team All-ECAC
- ECAC Player of the Week (Week of January 11, 2011)
- ECAC Player of the Week (Week of March 1, 2011)
- 2011 Patty Kazmaier Award Nominee
- 2010–11 All-ECAC First Team
- 2011 Second Team All-America selection
- 2010–11 First Team All-Ivy
- ECAC Player of the Year (2011–12)
- ECAC First Team All-Star (2011–12)
- 2012 winner, Cornell women's hockey Bob Brunet '41 Most Valuable Player

=== CWHL ===
- 2015 Angela James Bowl winner
- Most Valuable Player, 1st Canadian Women's Hockey League All-Star Game
