= Jayna Hefford Trophy =

Trophy in ice hockey

- Sport: Ice hockey
- Awarded for: Canadian Women's Hockey League's outstanding player in the regular season as judged by the players of the CWHL

History
- First award: 2015–16
- Final award: 2018–19
- Most recent: Marie-Philip Poulin

The Jayna Hefford Trophy, was a trophy in women's ice hockey awarded annually to the Canadian Women's Hockey League's most outstanding player in the regular season as judged by the players of the CWHL until the collapse of the league in 2019. It was awarded twice to the same player since its beginnings in 2016. It was a companion to the CWHL's Most Valuable Player Award, as awarded by the league.

The award was named for Brampton Thunder great Jayna Hefford, who had retired from hockey as the all-time leading scorer in the CWHL. The trophy was auctioned off in 2019 after the collapse of the CWHL.

== History ==
The award was first handed out at the conclusion of the 2015–16 CWHL season, during the weekend festivities for the 2016 Clarkson Cup. The inaugural winner of the Trophy was Marie-Philip Poulin of Les Canadiennes de Montreal.

== Winners ==
Positions key
C	Centre	D	Defence	RW	Right wing	LW	Left wing	G	Goaltender

Player is still active

Season	Winner	Team	Position	Win #
2015–16	Marie-Philip Poulin	Canadiennes de Montreal	C	1
2016–17	Marie-Philip Poulin	Canadiennes de Montreal	C	2
2017–18	Jamie Lee Rattray	Markham Thunder	C	1
2018–19	Marie-Philip Poulin	Canadiennes de Montreal	C	3
