= 2014–15 CWHL season =

Eighth league in CWHL history

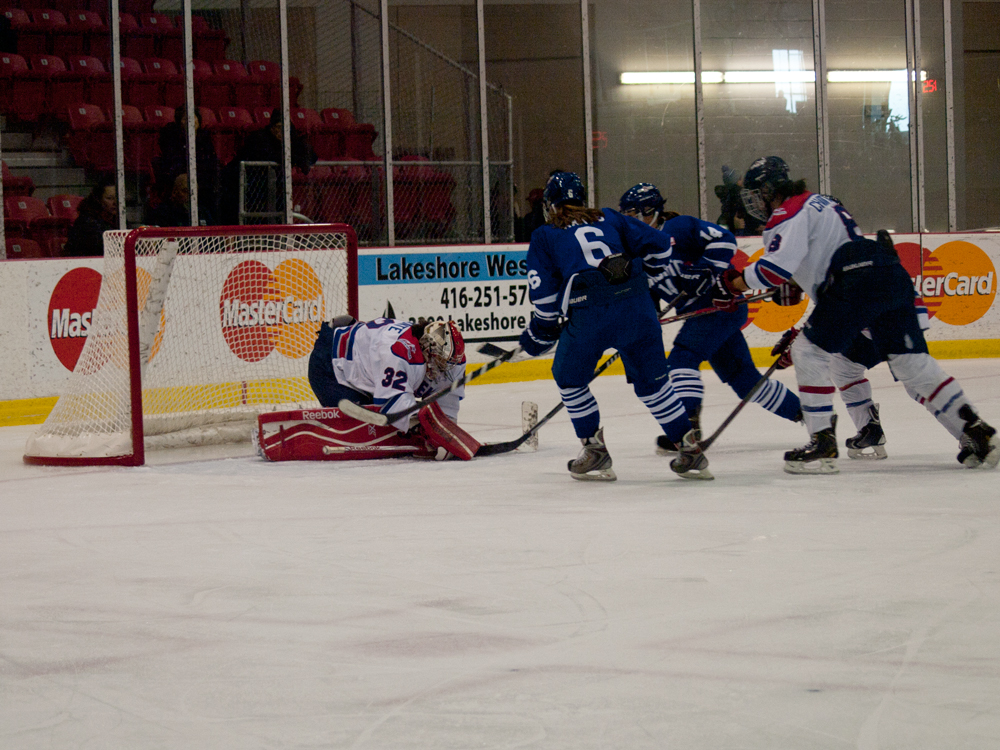
CHWL in January 2015

The 2014–15 CWHL season was the eighth in league history. The Boston Blades captured the 2015 Clarkson Cup in a 3-2 overtime win against the Montreal Stars.

== Offseason ==
- August 13: Arlene Dickinson, a business woman and television personality on the Canadian version of Dragon's Den was named to the CWHL's Board of Directors.
- August: Former Stanley Cup champion Kevin Haller was named head coach of the Calgary Inferno.
- August: The Calgary Inferno traded Jocelyne Larocque to the Brampton Thunder in exchange for Bailey Bram.

=== CWHL Draft ===
For the first time in franchise history, the Brampton Thunder held the first pick overall. Laura Fortino, a member of Canada's gold medal winning roster at the 2014 Sochi Winter Games was selected first. During the first round, Megan Bozek was selected by the Toronto Furies, making her the first American-born player to be selected in the draft. Goaltender Erica Howe was the first goaltender selected in the draft, going to the Thunder.

== Regular season ==
=== News and notes ===
- October 18: Rebecca Johnston made her debut for the Calgary Inferno logging two goals in a 5-4 shootout loss against the Toronto Furies.
- January 17–18: On January 17, Brianna Decker made her debut with the Boston Blades. In a road game against the Brampton Thunder, Decker registered a hat trick along with four assists for a seven-point night. It was the best debut for a player in CWHL history, as well as being the most points in a single game in Blades franchise history. The following day (January 18), Decker would contribute another three points as the Blades swept Brampton.
- January 18: In the third period of an 8-0 win for the Boston Blades over the Brampton Thunder, a fight took place. Boston's Monique Lamoureux and Brampton's Jamie Lee Rattray both threw punches, as video footage went viral online.
- February 8: In a game in Brampton vs the Thunder, Montreal's Caroline Ouellette passed former Thunder star Jayna Hefford on the CWHL All-Time Points list, with an assist on a goal by Noemie Marin. Ouellette recorded a goal & 2 assists on the evening, including the game winner. She ended the season with 246 points, 12 more than Hefford.
- February 14: The Toronto Furies hosted a Pink at the Rink event.
- February 21: A fundraiser for Breast Cancer was hosted by the Montreal Stars, with the club wearing pink jerseys in the first period. Of note, said jerseys were auctioned off for breast cancer research. In the contest, Noemie Marin scored the 100th goal of her CWHL career.
- February 22: In a weekend sweep of the Toronto Furies, Caroline Ouellette of the Montreal Stars also registered her 100th CWHL goal.
- February 28: Brianna Decker's 10-game point scoring streak is snapped in a road contest against the Montreal Stars. From January 17 to February 22, Decker logged points in the first ten games of her CWHL career, accumulating a total of 30 points.
- March 1: CWHL co-founder Lisa-Marie Breton-Lebreux announced her retirement, playing in her final CWHL game with the Montreal Stars.

=== All-Star Game ===
Held at Toronto's Air Canada Centre, the inaugural CWHL All-Star Game was held in December. Jessica Campbell and Charline Labonte were voted as team captains by the fans. Coached by Digit Murphy, Team Red would prevail by a 3-2 tally, with all three goals scored in the third period. The game-winning goal was scored by Rebecca Johnston of the Calgary Inferno, while Brampton Thunder rookie goaltender Erica Howe earned the win.

== Awards and honors ==
- Dany Brunet, Montreal Stars: CWHL Coach of the Year Award Winner
- Brianna Decker, Boston Blades: CWHL Rookie of the Year Award Winner
- Mallory Deluce, Toronto Furies: Isobel Gathorne-Hardy Award
- Rebecca Johnston, Calgary Inferno: 2015 Angela James Bowl winner
- Rebecca Johnston, Calgary Inferno: 2015 CWHL Most Valuable Player Award Winner
- Charline Labonte, Montreal Stars: CWHL Goaltender of the Year Award
- Tara Watchorn, Boston Blades: CWHL Defender of the Year Award

=== CWHL All-Rookie Team ===
- Goaltender: Erica Howe, Brampton
- Defender: Monique Lamoureux, Boston
- Defender: Laura Fortino, Brampton
- Forward: Brianna Decker, Boston
- Forward: Jamie Lee Rattray, Brampton
- Forward: Jessica Campbell, Calgary
