= Bob Bedier =

Canadian ice hockey player

- Born: December 7, 1959 (age 66) Fort Nelson, British Columbia, Canada
- Height: 6 ft 3 in (191 cm)
- Weight: 205 lb (93 kg; 14 st 9 lb)
- Position: Centre
- Shot: Left
- Played for: AHL; New Haven Nighthawks; Springfield Indians; Moncton Alpines; IHL; Toledo Goaldiggers
- Playing career: 1980–1983

Bob Bedier (born December 7, 1959) is a Canadian former professional ice hockey player.

Bedier played junior hockey with the Brandon Wheat Kings of the Western Hockey League, and also with the Red Deer Rustlers of the Alberta Junior Hockey League, where he played with Brent Sutter in helping the Rustlers to capture the 1980 Centennial Cup.

Bedier went on to play three seasons of professional hockey, including 112 games in the American Hockey League with the New Haven Nighthawks, Springfield Indians and Moncton Alpines, and 60 games in the International Hockey League with the Toledo Goaldiggers.

Following his professional career, Bedier continues to play senior hockey. He was the player coach of the 1988-89 Grande Prairie Athletics of the Central Peace Hockey League, and he continues to skate in the Rocky Mountain Petroleum Hockey League, where he has been playing since 2003.
