= Toronto Furies =

- City: Toronto, Ontario
- League: Canadian Women's Hockey League
- Founded: 2011
- Folded: 2019
- Home arena: Mastercard Centre
- Colours: Blue and white
- Owner: CWHL
- General manager: Sami Jo Small
- Head coach: Courtney Kessel
- Captain: Natalie Spooner
- Website: toronto.thecwhl.com

Franchise history
- 2010–2011: Toronto CWHL
- 2011–2019: Toronto Furies

Championships
- Playoff championships: 1 (2013–14)

The Toronto Furies were a professional women's ice hockey team that played in Toronto, Ontario, as members of the Canadian Women's Hockey League. The Toronto Furies played their home games at the Mastercard Centre in Toronto. The team was established in 2010 as an expansion team called Toronto CWHL during a league-wide restructuring. The team adopted the name "Furies" after the 2011 Clarkson Cup.

The club won the 2014 Clarkson Cup championship in 1–0 overtime victory over the Boston Blades.

In 2019, the CWHL ceased operations, as well as all teams that it directly owned including the Furies.

== History ==
Prior to the 2010–11 season, the Canadian Women's Hockey League (CWHL) underwent a structural reorganization. The CWHL considered the restructure a relaunch of the league. Among the changes included the Mississauga Chiefs, Ottawa Senators and Vaughan Flames teams ceasing operations, adding a new team in Toronto. The relaunch also branded the five teams after their respective locations, simply calling the new teams by their locations such as "Toronto CWHL". However, the CWHL teams that were playing in previous markets were commonly referred to as their former names, and the new Toronto team was sometimes called the Toronto Aeros after a former NWHL team that ceased operations in 2007 or Toronto HC. The league held its first player draft on August 12, 2010, although it was only for the three Greater Toronto Area teams as the league decided that since they do not pay a salary, it would be unfair to force players to be based outside their hometown. The new Toronto team protected former Mississauga Chiefs' Jennifer Botterill and Sami Jo Small and acquired many of the former Chiefs' players in the draft.

The Toronto CWHL team finished the 2010–11 regular season in fourth place and qualified for the 2011 Clarkson Cup by defeating fellow CHWL expansion team and third-place finisher, the Boston Blades two games to none in playoff. The team then defeated the Brampton Thunder 3–2 and the Minnesota Whitecaps 6–0 during the Clarkson Cup round-robin to advance to the championship game. Toronto then lost 5–0 to the Montreal Stars. The team adopted the Toronto Furies name after the season ended. The decision behind naming the franchise Furies was featured on an episode of History Television's program What's In a Name? aired on September 12, 2011. Players voted on one of five names suggested by fans. The five names that fans suggested included: the Toronto Force, Toronto Tornadoes, Toronto Snipes, Toronto Furies and the Toronto Vamps.

Two Furies players became the fourth and fifth women to play 150 career games in 2013–14. On November 16, 2013, Kristy Zamora reached the milestone. On November 23, 2013, a 4–2 victory over Brampton provided Meagan Aarts with her 150th game.

During the 2013–14 CWHL season, there were a handful of milestones which the Furies reached. On February 9, 2014, a victory against the defending Clarkson Cup champion Boston Blades provided Furies goaltender Sami Jo Small with the 60th victory of her career. With the win, she became the first CWHL goaltender to reach the 60 wins plateau. A March 8 game against the Brampton Thunder resulted in Meagan Aarts earning the 100 point in her CWHL career.

The Furies defeated the Boston Blades by a 1–0 tally in overtime to claim their first Clarkson Cup title in 2014. The tournament was played at Markham Centennial Centre. With the victory, Natalie Spooner became the first woman in hockey history to claim the gold medal in the Olympic Winter Games and the Clarkson Cup in the same year.

During the summer of 2016, Kori Cheverie retired from the Furies with three franchise records: points (82), games played (152) and power play goals (14). In addition, she holds the league record for most consecutive games played with 152.

On June 11, 2018, inaugural member Sami Jo Small was named general manager of the Furies. Among her first moves was signing Courtney Birchard as their new head coach. In addition, Ken Dufton was named as an advisor to the team. On the free agent market, Small signed goaltender Elaine Chuli and forward Shiann Darkangelo to contracts in August 2018.

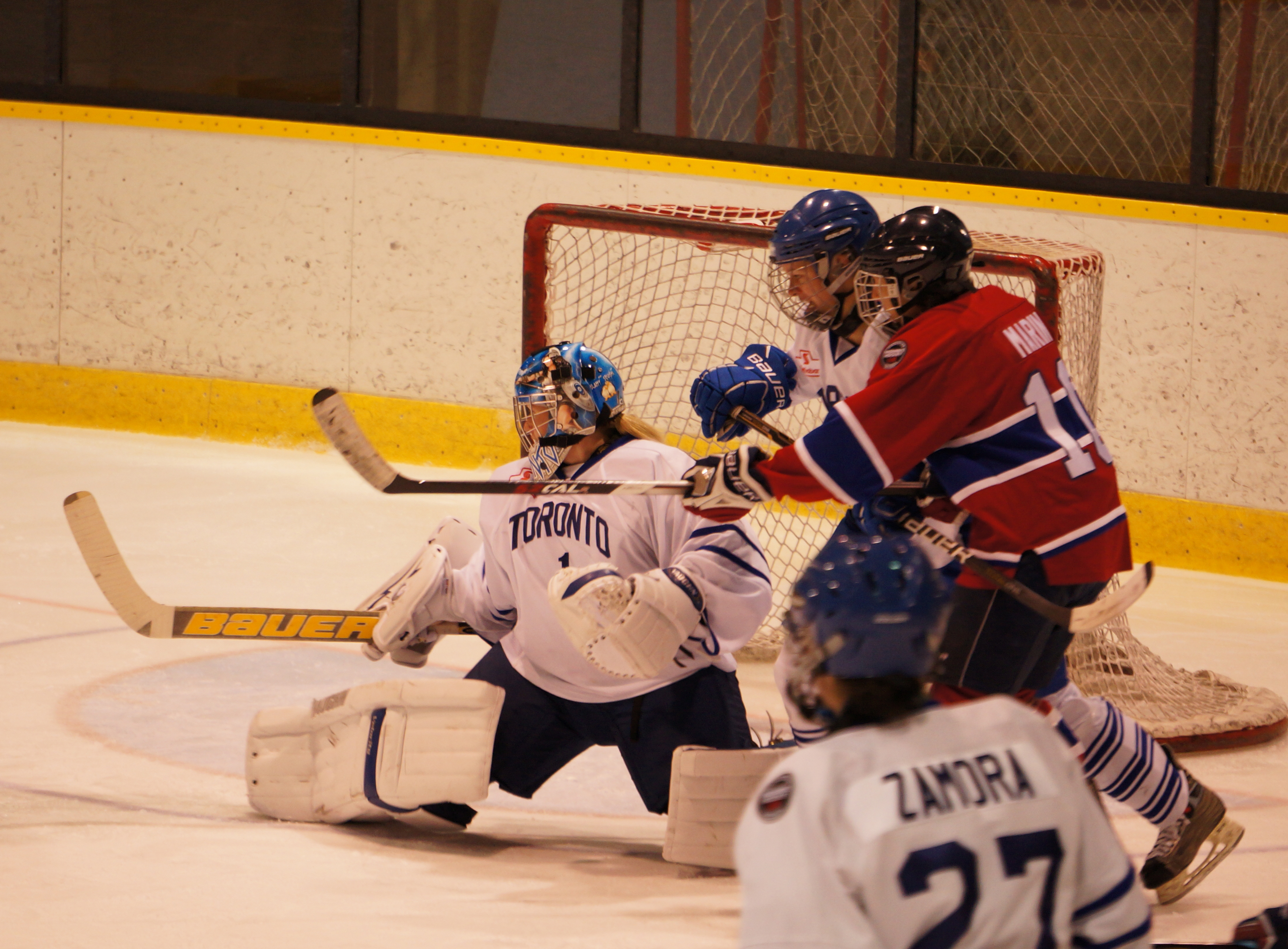
Sami Jo Small

On March 31, 2019, the CWHL announced that the league was folding on May 1, 2019. The Furies' organization released a statement saying that it would continue to try and have a team despite the folding of the league. The competing National Women's Hockey League then announced it was in negotiations for placing a team in Toronto but ultimately was not able to launch for the 2019–20 season. The NWHL later awarded Toronto an expansion team for the 2020–21 season with the Toronto Six.

== Season-by-season records ==
Year	GP	W	L	OTL	SOL	GF	GA	Pts	Finish	Playoffs
2010–11	26	8	13	0	5	83	98	21	4th	Lost 2011 Clarkson Cup championship game, 0–5 vs. Montreal Stars
2011–12	27	9	13	2	3	75	105	26	4th	Eliminated in 2012 Clarkson Cup round-robin
2012–13	24	10	13	1	0	60	72	21	4th	Eliminated in 2013 Clarkson Cup round-robin
2013–14	23	10	10	1	2	70	61	23	4th	Won 2014 Clarkson Cup championship game, 1–0 (OT) vs. Boston Blades
2014–15	24	8	13	1	2	51	88	19	4th	Lost 2015 Clarkson Cup semifinals, 0–2 vs. Boston Blades
2015–16	24	6	16	1	1	59	87	14	4th	Lost 2016 Clarkson Cup semifinals, 0–2 vs. Les Canadiennes
2016–17	24	9	11	3	1	52	58	22	4th	Lost 2016 Clarkson Cup semifinals, 1–2 vs. Calgary Inferno
2017–18	28	9	17	1	1	56	99	20	6th	did not qualify
2018–19	28	14	14	0	0	64	77	28	4th	Lost 2019 Clarkson Cup semifinals, 1–2 vs. Calgary Inferno

== Coaches ==
- Sommer West, 2012–2017
- Jeff Flanagan, 2017–2018
- Courtney Kessel, 2018–2019

== Scoring leaders ==
=== Year-by-year ===
Season	Leader (F)	GP	G	A	Pts	Leader (D)	GP	G	A	Pts	PPG	SHG	GWG
2010–11	Jennifer Botterill	25	14	30	44	Britni Smith	29	8	21	29	Tessa Bonhomme (4)	Three tied with 1	Tessa Bonhomme (3)
2011–12	Mallory Deluce	20	12	9	21	Tessa Bonhomme	24	4	12	16	Kori Cheverie (6)	Three tied with 1	Mallory Deluce (4)
2012–13	Rebecca Johnston	24	8	17	25	Tessa Bonhomme	24	4	5	9	Six tied with 1	Natalie Spooner (3)	Natalie Spooner (3)
2013–14	Carolyne Prevost	23	11	12	23	Michelle Bonello	22	2	10	12	Carolyne Prevost & Alyssa Baldin (4)	Carolyne Prevost (1)	Katie Wilson (3)
2014–15	Jenelle Kohanchuk	21	7	10	17	Megan Bozek	22	3	7	10	Carolyne Prevost (4)	None	Carolyne Prevost (3)
2015–16	Natalie Spooner	22	17	13	30	Michelle Bonello	24	0	8	8	Natalie Spooner (5)	Natalie Spooner (2)	Kori Cheverie (2)
2016–17	Natalie Spooner	20	13	7	20	Renata Fast	22	4	5	9	Julie Allen & Michela Cava (3)	Natalie Spooner (2)	Natalie Spooner (4)
2017–18	Carolyne Prevost	28	10	12	22	Katie Gaskin	21	0	8	8	Emily Fulton (5)	Carolyne Prevost (2)	Emily Fulton (3)

== Draft picks ==
- These are the first selections for every respective draft that Toronto participated in.

Draft year	Player	Pick	College
2010	Tessa Bonhomme	1st Overall	Ohio State Buckeyes
2011	Jesse Scanzano	5th Overall	Mercyhurst Lakers
2012	Rebecca Johnston	2nd Overall	Cornell Big Red
2013	Katie Wilson	2nd Overall	Minnesota Duluth Bulldogs
2014	Megan Bozek	2nd Overall	Minnesota Golden Gophers
2015	Emily Fulton	2nd Overall	Cornell Big Red
2016	Renata Fast	2nd Overall	Clarkson University
2017	Kristyn Capizzano	2nd Overall	Boston College
2018	Sarah Nurse	2nd Overall	University of Wisconsin

== Awards and honours ==
- Sommer West, 2014 CWHL Coach of the Year
- Mallory Deluce, 2015 Isobel Gathorne-Hardy Award
- Christina Kessler, 2014 Clarkson Cup Most Valuable Player
- Britni Smith, First Star of the Game, 2014 Clarkson Cup finals
- Christina Kessler, Second Star of the Game, 2014 Clarkson Cup finals

== See also ==
- Toronto Aeros
- Mississauga Chiefs
- Scarborough Sting
