= Calgary Inferno =

- City: Calgary, Alberta, Canada
- League: Canadian Women's Hockey League
- Founded: 2011
- Folded: 2019
- Home arena: WinSport Canada
- Colours: Red, yellow, black, white
- General manager: Kristen Hagg
- Head coach: Ryan Hilderman (co-coach); Mandi Duhamel (co-coach)
- Media: PCSN.tv

Championships
- Playoff championships: 2 (2015–16, 2018–19)

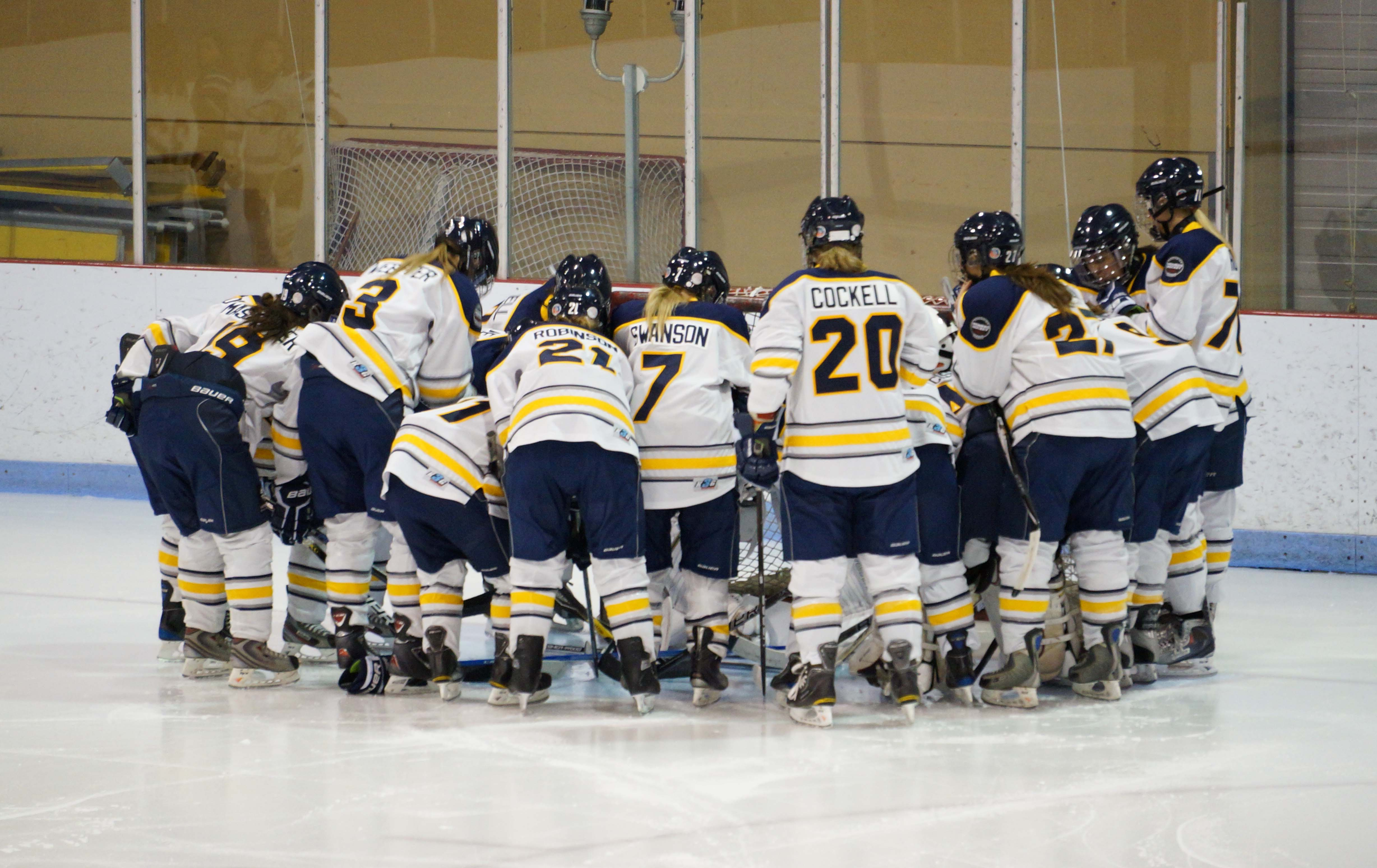
The Alberta players discussing strategy

The Calgary Inferno (previously known as Team Alberta, nickname "Honeybadgers", during the 2011–12 season) was a women's ice hockey team that joined the Canadian Women's Hockey League (CWHL) for the 2011–12 season. The team played its home games at Joan Snyder Rink (Arena B) at WinSport Canada in Calgary, Alberta. After two seasons without an official name, in 2013 the team picked a moniker drawing from Calgary's National Hockey League franchise, the Calgary Flames, with whom they had a partnership. For the 2013-14 season, it was announced that all Inferno home-games would be streamed live by PCSN.tv.

In 2019, the CWHL ceased operations, as well as all teams that it directly operated – including the Inferno.

== History ==
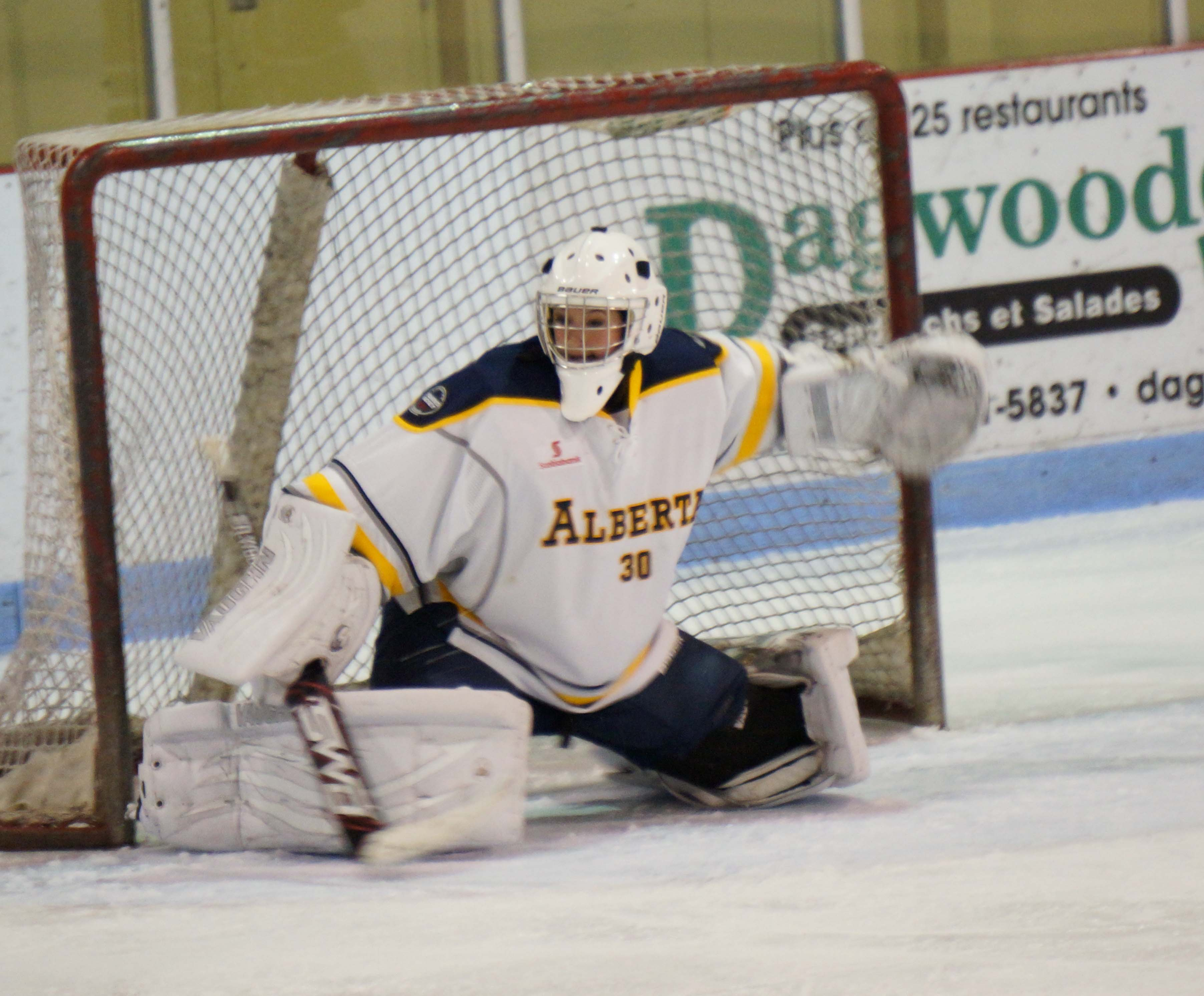
For 2011–12 season, Lundy Day was Alberta's regular Goaltender

The Canadian Women's Hockey League (CWHL) announced on April 19, 2011, that it would merge with the Western Women's Hockey League (WWHL) for the 2011–12 season. The merger featured one team based in Edmonton and Calgary as a combination of the former WWHL franchises the Edmonton Chimos and Strathmore Rockies. The team would play their games in various locations around Alberta. Strathmore Rockies founder, Samantha Holmes-Domagala, joined the sponsorship division of the CWHL to look after the requirements of the expansion team. On July 21, 2011, philanthropist Joan Snyder donated $2 million to WinSport Canada with the goal of ensuring priority rink access to female hockey players at all levels and help expand the CWHL with the creation of Team Alberta. Part of the donation covered the new addition to the Athletic and Ice Complex at Canada Olympic Park in Calgary and serve as the future home to Hockey Canada. It also included four hockey rinks, one of which was called the Joan Snyder Rink. Team Alberta would benefit with the allocation of free practice time, a dressing room exclusive to the club. The Joan Snyder Rink give priority to women's hockey bookings, but it also served as the Team Alberta's home rink.

The first general manager was Samantha Holmes, while the first head coach was Jason Schmidt. On July 21, 2011, the franchise participated in its first CWHL Draft. With the third overall pick in the 2011 CWHL Draft, Team Alberta selected Meaghan Mikkelson. With the first pick overall in the 2012 CWHL Draft, the team selected Hillary Pattenden. On October 28, 2011, Team Alberta played its first game in the CWHL versus the Burlington Barracudas. Laura Dostaler scored the first goal in Team Alberta history in a 4–2 victory. Other goals were scored by Meghan Hunter, Jenna Cunningham and Courtney Sawchuk.

On September 23, 2013, after two years without an official name, the team was announced as the Calgary Inferno at the Calgary Flames' arena, Scotiabank Saddledome, prior to a pre-season game between the Flames and the New York Rangers. On March 13, 2016, the Calgary Inferno defeated Les Canadiennes de Montreal in an 8–3 final to capture its first Clarkson Cup. Contested at Ottawa's Canadian Tire Centre, the first Clarkson Cup final held in an NHL arena, Blayre Turnbull, Brianne Jenner, Jessica Campbell and Rebecca Johnston each scored twice. Goaltender Delayne Brian was recognized as the Most Valuable Player of the Clarkson Cup playoffs.

On February 2, 2014, Danielle Stone broke two scoring records in Calgary Inferno franchise history. She began by topping Samantha Hunt's franchise record for most points in one season of 14 in a 2–1 shootout win against the Montreal Stars. In the same game, she set a new record for most points in one season by an Inferno rookie. In that same game, Jessica Wong logged a goal, providing her with seven points in the first five games of her CWHL career, a new franchise record for the Inferno.

At the 3rd CWHL All-Star Game in 2017, Jillian Saulnier and Jess Jones both scored a hat trick, becoming the first competitors in CWHL All-Star Game history to achieve the feat.

== Season-by-season ==
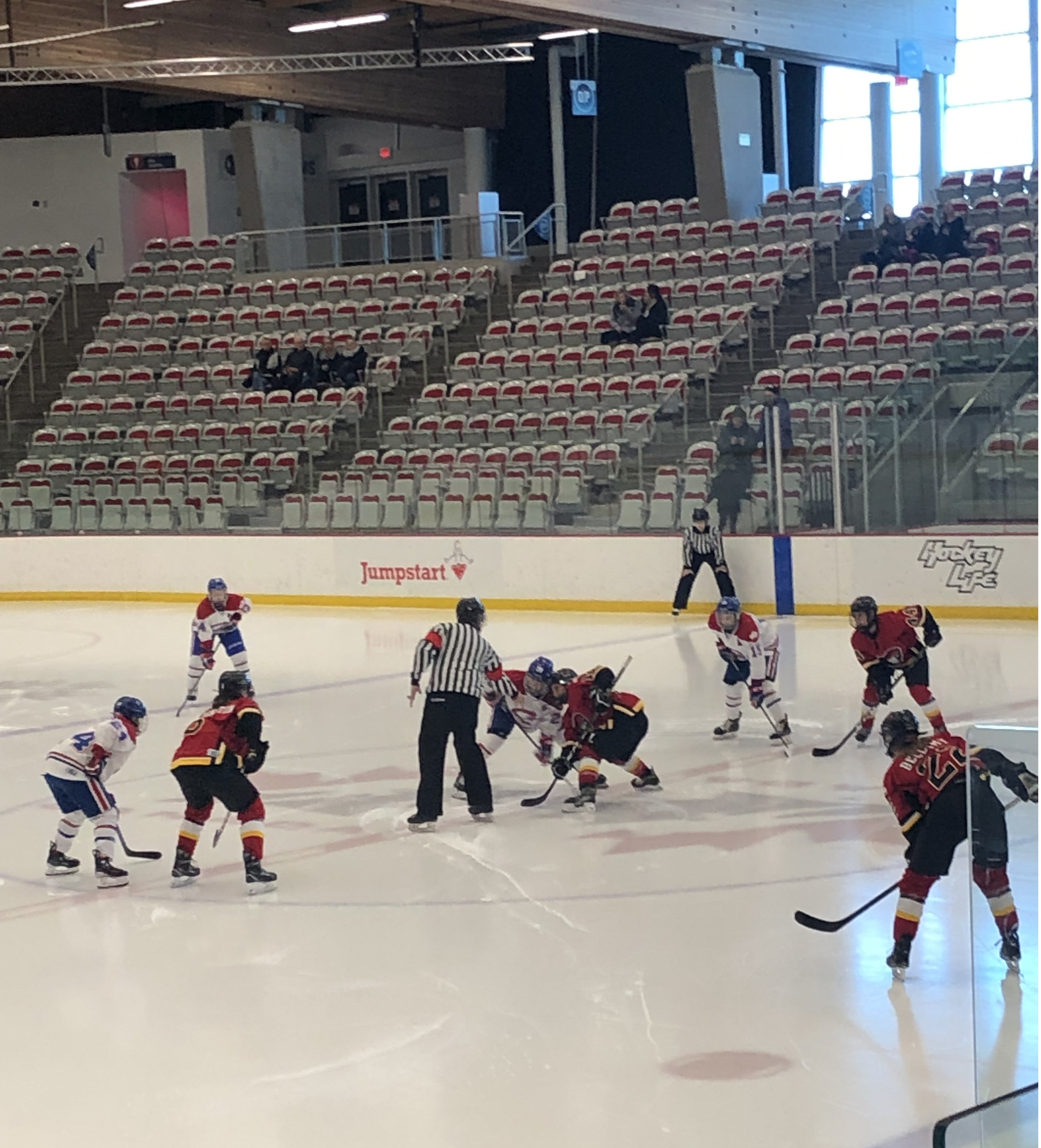
Calgary Inferno Facing off against Montreal in 2018

Year	GP	W	L	OTL	Pts	GF	GA	Final standing
2011–12	15	5	10	0	20	38	66	5th
2012–13	24	3	21	0	6	30	86	5th
2013–14	24	12	11	1	25	62	70	3rd
2014–15	24	15	6	3	33	84	64	2nd
2015–16	17	13	3	1	27	77	49	1st
2016–17	24	20	4	0	40	100	45	1st
2017–18	28	17	7	4	38	96	70	3rd
2018–19	28	23	4	1	47	111	54	1st

== Current roster ==
Updated August 8, 2018.

No.	Nat	Player	Pos	S/G	Age	Acquired	Birthplace
13	(Canada)	Kelty Apperson	F	R	32	2017	New Hamburg, Ontario
22	(United States)	Kacey Bellamy	D	L	39	2018	Westfield, Massachusetts
41	(Canada)	Annie Belanger	G	L	32	2018	Sherbrooke, Quebec
14	(United States)	Brianna Decker	C	R	35	2018	Dousman, Wisconsin
2	(Canada)	Laura Dostaler	F	R	35	2011	Edmonton, Alberta
25	(Russia)	Iya Gavrilova	F	L	39	2016	Krasnoyarsk, Russia
51	(Canada)	Katelyn Gosling	D	L	33	2016	London, Ontario
3	(United States)	Tori Hickel	D	R	32	2018	Anchorage, Alaska
44	(United States)	Zoe Hickel	RW	R	34	2018	Anchorage, Alaska
7	(Finland)	Venla Hovi	F	L	38	2018	Tampere, Finland
19	(Canada)	Brianne Jenner	C	R	35	2015	Oakville, Ontario
6	(Canada)	Rebecca Johnston	F	L	37	2014	Sudbury, Ontario
8	(Canada)	Erica Kromm	F	L	37	2012	Smithtown, British Columbia
21	(Canada)	Halli Krzyzaniak	D	R	31	2018	Brandon, Manitoba
10	(Canada)	Rhianna Kurio	F	R	34	2013	Calgary, Alberta
4	(Canada)	Brigette Lacquette	D	R	33	2015	Dauphin, Manitoba
16	(Canada)	Rebecca Leslie	F	L	30	2018	Ottawa, Ontario
18	(Japan)	Aina Mizukami	D	L	35	2014	Kushiro, Japan
11	(Canada)	Eden Murray	F	L	30	2018	Medicine Hat, Alberta
5	(Canada)	Kelly Murray	D	L	32	2017	Medicine Hat, Alberta
33	(Canada)	Lindsey Post	G	L	32	2017	Chelsea, Quebec
1	(United States)	Alex Rigsby	G	L	34	2018	Delafield, Wisconsin
40	(Canada)	Blayre Turnbull	F	R	33	2015	New Glasgow, Nova Scotia
28	(Canada)	Louise Warren	F	L	33	2014	Orangeville, Ontario
17	(Canada)	Kaitlin Willoughby	C	R	31	2018	Prince Albert, Saskatchewan
9	(United States)	Dakota Woodworth	F	R	32	2017	Beverly, Massachusetts

== Coaching staff ==
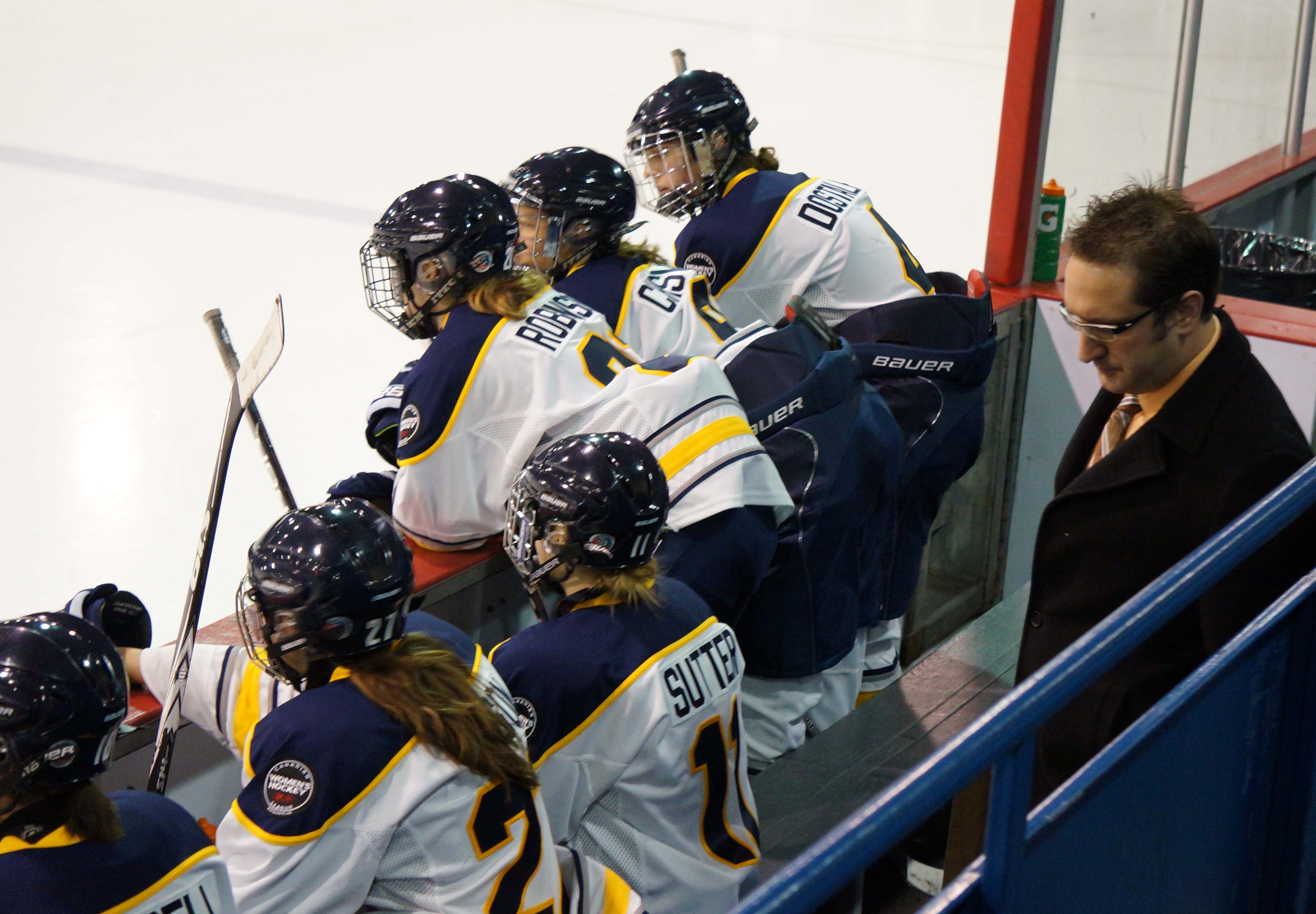
Jason Schmidt was the team's first coach.

- Kristen Hagg: general manager
- Shannon Miller: head coach

=== Former staff ===
- Bob Bedier, assistant coach
- Tim Bothwell: head coach, 2012–14
- Erin Duggan: assistant coach, 2011–12
- Kevin Haller: head coach, 2014–15; assistant coach, 2012–14
- Samantha Holmes-Domagala & Matt Appelt: general manager, 2011–12
- Gina Kingsbury: assistant coach
- Jason Schmidt: coach, 2011–12
- Jeff Stevenson: general manager

== Scoring leaders ==
=== Year-by-year ===
Season	Leader (F)	GP	G	A	Pts	Leader (D)	GP	G	A	Pts	PPG	SHG	GWG
2011-12	Sam Hunt	15	5	9	14	Meaghan Mikkelson	15	2	9	11	Jenna Cunningham(4)	Bianca Zuber (1)	Cunningham(2)
2012-13	Jenna Cunningham	23	4	4	8	Meaghan Mikkelson; Tara Watchorn	23; 22	3; 3	4; 4	7; 7	Cunningham (2)	None	Mikkelson (2)
2013-14	Danielle Stone	24	15	10	25	Tegan Schroeder	24	1	9	10	Stone (5)	Chelsea Purcell (1)	Jenna Cunningham (3)
2014-15	Rebecca Johnston	24	17	20	37	Jessica Wong	24	2	11	13			Jessica Campbell (5)
2015–16	Brianne Jenner	24	10	18	28	Hayleigh Cudmore	24	2	13	15	Brittany Esposito (5)	Jillian Saulnier; Rebecca Johnston; Kristen Hagg (1)	Saulnier (4)
2016–17	Brianne Jenner	20	9	18	27	Meaghan Mikkelson	22	5	10	15			

== Awards and honours ==
- Delayne Brian, 2014 CWHL Goaltender of the Year
- Delayne Brian, 2016 Clarkson Cup Most Valuable Player
- Jessica Campbell, 2014–15 CWHL Leader, Game Winning Goals (5)
- Rebecca Johnston, 2015 Angela James Bowl winner
- Elana Lovell, 2016 CWHL Rookie of the Year

== 2011 draft picks ==
In preparation of its first season, the Team Alberta CWHL selected several players during a special draft of the league held on July 21, 2011, in Mississauga, Ontario.

Draft pick	Player	Hometown	Former team
3	Meaghan Mikkelson (Defender)	(Canada) St. Albert, Alberta	Canada women's national ice hockey team
9	Bobbi-Jo Slusar (Defender)	(Canada) Swift Current, Saskatchewan	Canada women's national ice hockey team
15	Keely Brown (Goalie)	(Canada) Edmonton, Alberta	Toronto Lady Blues women's ice hockey
21	Jill MacIsaac (Goalie)	(Canada) Timberlea, Nova Scotia	Saint Mary's Huskies
27	Courtney Sawchuk (Defender)	(Canada) Sherwood Park, Alberta	Edmonton Chimos
33	Colleen Olsen (Forward)	(Canada) Sherwood Park, Alberta	Edmonton Chimos
39	Jill Kern		
45	Brittaney Maschmeyer (Defender)	(Canada) Bruderheim, Alberta	St. Lawrence Skating Saints women's ice hockey
51	Kaley Hall-Herman (Forward)	(Canada) Calgary, Alberta	Strathmore Rockies (WWHL)
62	Sam Hunt (Forward)	(Canada) Calgary, Alberta	Colgate Raiders women's ice hockey
64	Kelsey Webster (Defender)	(Canada) Duncan, British Columbia	Strathmore Rockies (WWHL)
66	Karlee Overguard (Forward)	(Canada) Sundre, Alberta	Cornell Big Red women's ice hockey
68	Katie Stewart (Forward)	(Canada) Exeter, Ontario	Cornell Big Red women's ice hockey
70	Jenna Cunningham (Forward)	(Canada) Medicine Hat, Alberta	Dartmouth Big Green women's ice hockey
72	Amber Overguard (Forward)	(Canada) Sundre, Alberta	Cornell Big Red women's ice hockey
74	Erin Duggan (Defender)	(Canada) Beaumont, Alberta	Yale Bulldogs women's ice hockey
76	Dana Vinge (Goalie)	(Canada) Edmonton, Alberta	Alberta Pandas women's ice hockey
78	Ashley Cockell (Forward)	(Canada) Fort Assiniboine, Alberta	Mercyhurst Lakers women's ice hockey
80	Carrie Olsen (Defender)	(Canada) Calgary, Alberta	Red Deer College Queens
82	Taryn Peacock (Forward)	(Canada) Calgary, Alberta	Strathmore Rockies (WWHL)
84	Larissa Roche (Forward)	(Canada) Thorhild, Alberta	Dartmouth Big Green women's ice hockey
85	Kelsey MacMillan (Forward)	(Canada) Sherwood Park, Alberta	Alberta Institute of Technology Ooks women's ice hockey
86	Lundy Day (Goalie)	(Canada) Calgary, Alberta	Strathmore Rockies (WWHL)
87	Mia Mucci (Forward)	(Canada) Canmore, Alberta	Alberta Pandas women's ice hockey
88	Amanda Nonis (Forward)	(Canada) Brampton, Ontario	College Manhattanville Valiants women's ice hockey
89	Kendra Chisholm (Goalie)	(Canada) Sherwood Park, Alberta	Neumann University Knights women's ice hockey
90	Tara Swanson (Defender)	(Canada) Wetaskiwin, Alberta	Edmonton Chimos (WWHL)
91	Becky Irvine (Forward)	(Canada) Halifax, Nova Scotia	Colgate Raiders women's ice hockey
92	Seyara Shwetz (Defender)	(Canada) Waskatenau, Alberta	Saint Mary's Huskies
93	Kaley Herman (Goalie)	(Canada) Weyburn, Saskatchewan	New Hampshire Wildcats women's ice hockey
94	Nicole Symington (Forward)	(Canada) Burlington, Ontario	Yale Bulldogs women's ice hockey
95	Carli Clemis (Goalie)	(Canada) Taber, Alberta	Dartmouth Big Green women's ice hockey
96	Amanda Squire (Goalie)	(Canada) Comox, British Columbia	Mount Royal Cougars women's ice hockey
97	Jennifer Moe (Forward)	(Canada) Bonnyville, Alberta	Calgary Dinos women's ice hockey
98	Lindsay Robinson (Forward)	(Canada) Edmonton, Alberta	Edmonton Chimos (WWHL)
99	Kristin Miyauchi (Forward)	(Canada) Calgary, Alberta	SAIT Polytechnic Trojans women's ice hockey
100	Lauren Chiswell (Forward)	(Canada) Edmonton, Alberta	Edmonton Chimos (WWHL)
101	Kristen Sugiyama (Goalie)	(Canada) Edmonton, Alberta	Grant MacEwen Griffins women's ice hockey
102	Laura Dostaler (Forward)	(Canada) Beaumont, Alberta	Edmonton Chimos (WWHL)
103	Danielle MacDougall (Forward)	(Canada) Sherwood Park, Alberta	Saint Mary's Huskies
104	Kelly Godel (Forward)	(Canada) Hythe, Alberta	Alberta Pandas women's ice hockey
105	Jill Barber (Forward)	(Canada) Irma, Alberta	Grant MacEwen Griffins women's ice hockey
106	Danielle Boyce (Forward)	(Canada) Summerside, Prince Edward Island	Calgary Dinos women's ice hockey
107	Kendal Jurista (Forward)	(Canada) Kamloops, British Columbia	Northern Alberta Institute of Technology Ooks women's ice hockey
108	Bret Seaton (Forward)	(Canada) Brooks, Alberta	SAIT Polytechnic Trojans women's ice hockey
109	Georgia Moore (Forward)	Melbourne, Australia	SAIT Polytechnic Trojans women's ice hockey
110	Alanna McMullen (Defender)	(Canada) Calgary, Alberta	Buffalo State College Bengals women's ice hockey
111	Christina Ashley (Defender)	(Canada) Stirling, Ontario	Mount Allison Mounties women's ice hockey
112	Jenna Ouellette (Forward)	(Canada) Winnipeg, Manitoba	Maine Black Bears women's ice hockey
