= 2016–17 CWHL season =

- League: Canadian Women's Hockey League
- Sport: Ice hockey
- Duration: October 2016 to March 2017
- Teams: 5

Regular season
- Season champions: Calgary Inferno
- Season MVP: Marie-Philip Poulin
- Top scorer: Marie-Philip Poulin & Jess Jones

Clarkson Cup
- Champions: Les Canadiennes
- Runners-up: Calgary Inferno

Seasons
- 2015–16 2017–18

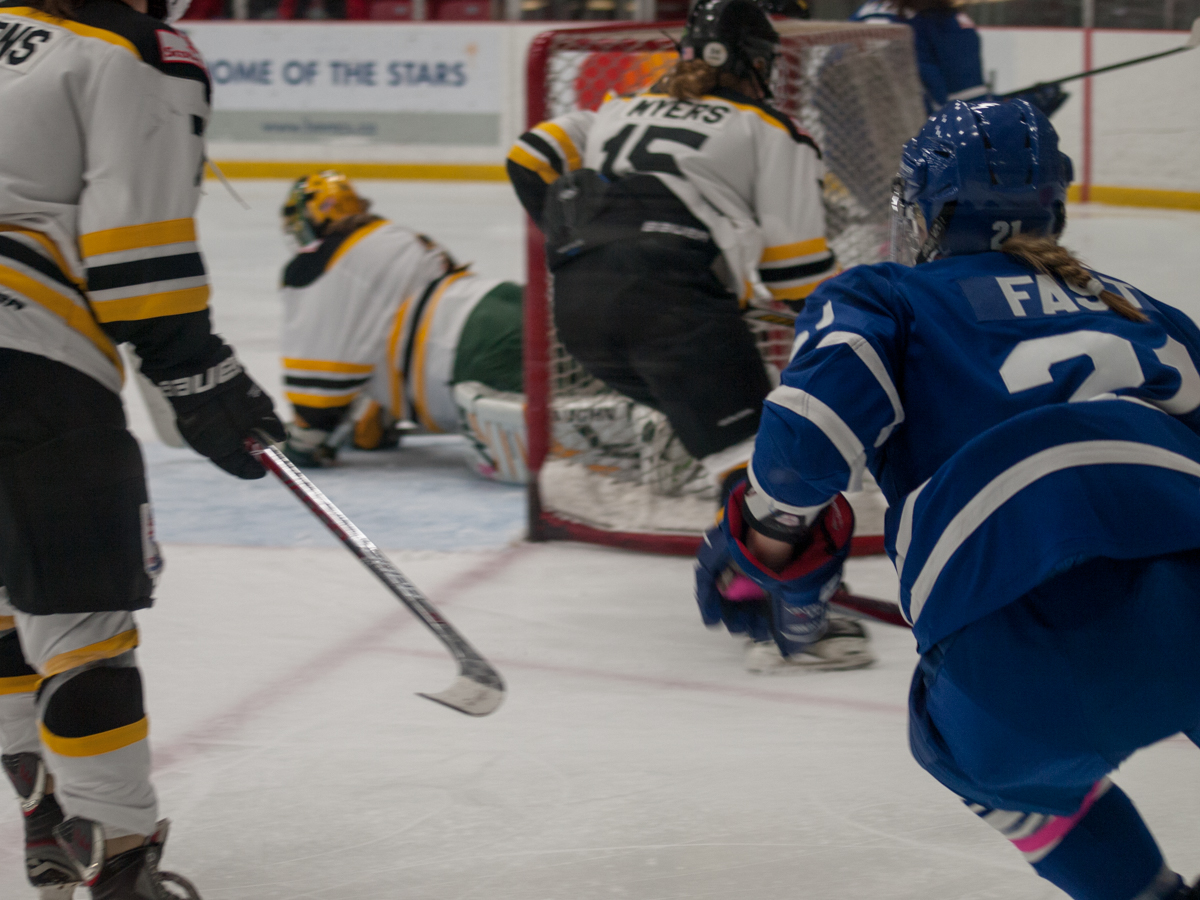
CWHL '16-'17, Toronto Furies vs Boston Blades(2016-10-15)

The 2016–17 CWHL season was the tenth in the history of the Canadian Women's Hockey League (CWHL). Opening weekend took place on Saturday, October 15 and Sunday, October 16, with a pair of series taking place in the Greater Toronto Area. The Toronto Furies hosted the Boston Blades in the first Heritage Game of the season. The 2016 Commissioners Trophy winning Canadiennes de Montreal took on the Brampton Thunder during opening weekend. The defending Clarkson Cup champion Calgary Inferno played their first game of the season on October 22, as they hosted the Brampton Thunder. Ottawa's Canadian Tire Centre was the host venue for the Clarkson Cup finals for the second consecutive year.

== Offseason ==
- August 27: The Calgary Inferno acquired Genevieve Lacasse from the Boston Blades, completing the trade that sent Tara Watchorn to the Blades in the summer of 2014.

=== CWHL Draft ===
The 2016 draft for the Canadian Women's Hockey League took place in Toronto on August 21, 2016. Kayla Tutino of the Boston University Terriers women's ice hockey program was selected first overall by the Boston Blades.

== Regular season ==
- On December 11, 2016, Caroline Ouellette logged a pair of assists, eclipsing the 300-point mark. Of note, Ouellette became the first player in the history of the CWHL to reach this plateau.
- On December 11, 2016, goaltender Lauren Dahm gained the first win of her CWHL career, as the Boston Blades defeated the Toronto Furies in a shoot-out.

=== Heritage Games ===
In honor of the CWHL's tenth anniversary season, all teams participated in Heritage Games, honoring team alumnae.

- October 15, 2016 - Boston Blades @ Toronto Furies
- November 19, 2016 - Calgary Inferno @ Brampton Thunder
- December 10, 2016 - Calgary Inferno @ Les Canadiennes de Montreal - Played at Montreal's Bell Centre
- January 7, 2016 - Les Canadiennes de Montreal @ Boston Blades
- February 4, 2016 - Boston Blades @ Calgary Inferno

=== All-Star Game ===
The CWHL All-Star Game was held at Toronto's Air Canada Centre on February 11, 2017. This marks the third time that the ACC has served as host venue for the event. Jess Jones of the Brampton Thunder and Jillian Saulnier of the Calgary Inferno both scored a hat trick as members of Team White, becoming the first competitors in CWHL All-Star Game history to achieve the feat.

== Clarkson Cup playoffs ==
Clarkson Cup semifinals best-of-three
1	Les Canadiennes	2
4	Brampton Thunder	0
2	Calgary Inferno	2
3	Toronto Furies	1

Clarkson Cup final Mar. 5
1	Les Canadiennes	3
2	Calgary Inferno	1

== Awards and honours ==
=== Regular season ===
- Chairman's Trophy: Calgary Inferno

=== Postseason awards ===
- 2017 Clarkson Cup Playoff MVP: Charline Labonte
- First Star of the Game 2017 Clarkson Cup: Charline Labonte
- Second Star of the Game 2017 Clarkson Cup: Marie-Philip Poulin
- Third Star of the Game 2017 Clarkson Cup: Jillian Saulnier

=== CWHL Awards ===
Award	Winner	Nominees
Angela James Bowl	Marie-Philip Poulin (MTL) and Jess Jones (BRA)	
Coach of the Year	Scott Reid (CGY)	Dany Brunet (MTL) and Brian McCloskey (BOS)
Defensive Player of the Year	Meaghan Mikkelson-Reid (CGY)	Laura Fortino (BRA) and Cathy Chartrand (MTL)
Goalie Of the Year	Charline Labonte (MTL)	Genevieve Lacasse (CGY) and Christina Kessler (TOR)
Humanitarian Award	Jessica Campbell (CGY)	
Jayna Hefford Trophy (league MVP voted by the players)	Marie-Philip Poulin (MTL)	Jess Jones (BRA) and Ann-Sophie Bettez (MTL)
Most Valuable Player	Marie-Philip Poulin (MTL)	Jess Jones (BRA) and Brianne Jenner (CGY)
Rookie Of The Year	Laura Stacey (BRA)	Renata Fast (TOR) and Iya Gavrilova (CGY)

=== CWHL All-Rookie Team ===
- Goaltender: Emerance Maschmeyer, Calgary
- Defender: Renata Fast, Toronto
- Defender: Katelyn Gosling, Calgary
- Forward: Laura Stacey, Brampton
- Forward: Kate Leary, Boston
- Forward: Michela Cava, Toronto
