= 2017–18 CWHL season =

- League: Canadian Women's Hockey League
- Sport: Ice hockey

Regular season
- Season champions: Les Canadiennes
- Season MVP: Kelli Stack and Jamie Lee Rattray (co-MVPs)
- Top scorer: Kelli Stack
- MVP: Erica Howe

Clarkson Cup
- Champions: Markham Thunder
- Runners-up: Kunlun Red Star WIH

Seasons
- 2016–17 2018–19

The 2017–18 CWHL season is the 11th season of the Canadian Women's Hockey League. This is also the first season in which the teams pay their players a salary. It would also prove to be the final full season in which Brenda Andress served as commissioner of the league, tendering her resignation on July 18, 2019.

== Offseason ==
On June 5, 2017, the league revealed at the Hockey Hall of Fame that it would expand into China with the Kunlun Red Star WIH, a women's team associated with the Kontinental Hockey League's Kunlun Red Star men's team. The recent expansions into China is aimed for developing their ice hockey teams for when Beijing hosts the 2022 Winter Olympics. Prior to the official announcement of the team joining the CWHL, Noora Räty and American forward Kelli Stack were at the announcement at the Hockey Hall of Fame wearing Red Star jerseys. The league soon added a second Chinese team in the Vanke Rays.

On July 11, 2017, it was announced that the Brampton Thunder, a founding franchise of the CWHL and the league's first champions, would be moving east to the Markham community of Thornhill, Ontatio. The move was announced with a press conference at their new arena with commissioner Brenda Andress, Mayor Frank Scarpitti, CWHL Director and esteemed Thunder alumni Vicky Sunohara, interim General Manager Chelsea Purcell (later named GM in August), and many Thunder players present.

On September 1, the league announced that it would begin having salaries for their players for the first time. Each player is set to make a minimum of $2,000 per season and a maximum of $10,000 with a team salary cap of $100,000. At the time of the announcement, it made the league the second fully professional women's hockey league in North America after the launch of the rival National Women's Hockey League in the United States in 2015.

=== Head coaching and front office personnel changes ===
==== Head coaches ====
Team	2016–17 head coach	2017–18 replacement	Notes
Calgary Inferno	Scott Reid	Tomas Pacina	
Markham Thunder	Tyler Fines	Jim Jackson	

==== Front office ====
Team	2016–17 GM	2017–18 replacement	Notes
Boston Blades	Krista Patronick	Jessica Martino	
Markham Thunder	Lori Dupuis	Chelsea Purcell	The club relocated to Markham, Ontario, from Brampton following the 2016–17 season
Toronto Furies	Rebecca Davies	Nicole Latreille	

=== CWHL Draft ===
The 2017 CWHL Draft marked the first time that the Draft involved the Kunlun Red Star WIH and Vanke Rays. Courtney Turner was selected with the first overall pick in the draft, claimed by the Boston Blades, becoming the first American-born player to be selected with the top pick.

== News and notes ==
- December 13, 2017: Erin Ambrose was traded from the Toronto Furies to les Canadiennes de Montreal. Ambrose did not play any games with the Furies this season as she had been centralized with the Canadian National Women's Team. In return, Toronto received Montreal's 2018 first and third round picks, a 2019 first round pick, and a 2020 third round pick.
- January 10, 2018: Megan Bozek signed as a free agent with the Markham Thunder.
- January 15, 2018: Alex Carpenter joined the Kunlun Red Star. KRS drafted her, but she had not played up until this date because she was centralized with the USNWT.
- March 8, 2018: Hilary Knight signed as a free agent with Les Canadiennes de Montreal, joining the team for the 2018 Clarkson Cup playoffs.
- March 20, 2018: Prior to the 2018 Clarkson Cup finals, Cassie Campbell-Pascall resigned from her role as a CWHL Governor.

== Regular season ==
=== Standings ===
Pos	Team	GP	W	L	OTL	ROW	GF	GA	GD	Pts
1	Les Canadiennes de Montreal	28	22	5	1	18	117	59	+58	45
2	Kunlun Red Star	28	21	6	1	20	96	52	+44	43
3	Calgary Inferno	28	17	7	4	16	96	70	+26	38
4	Markham Thunder	28	14	7	7	12	81	68	+13	35
5	Vanke Rays	28	14	13	1	10	78	97	−19	29
6	Toronto Furies	28	9	17	2	8	56	99	−43	20
7	Boston Blades	28	1	24	3	1	41	120	−79	5

Source: Canadian Women's Hockey League

== Clarkson Cup playoffs ==
Laura Stacey would score against Noora Raty of the Kunlun Red Star with 2:11 left in the 4-on-4 overtime, as Markham prevailed by a 2–1 score for its first Clarkson Cup win.

Clarkson Cup semifinals Best-of-three
1	Les Canadiennes	0
4	Markham Thunder	2
2	Kunlun Red Star WIH	2
3	Calgary Inferno	1

Clarkson Cup Championship
4	Markham Thunder	2 (OT)
2	Kunlun Red Star WIH	1

== Awards and honors ==
=== Regular season ===
- Chairman's Trophy: Les Canadiennes de Montreal

=== Postseason awards ===
- 2018 Clarkson Cup Playoff MVP: Erica Howe
- First Star of the Game: Laura Stacey
- Second Star of the Game: Nicole Brown
- Third Star of the Game: Kelli Stack

=== CWHL Awards ===
Award	Winner	Nominees
Angela James Bowl	Kelli Stack (KRS)	
Coach of the Year	Tomas Pacina (CGY)	Dany Brunet (MTL) and Jeff Flanagan (TOR)
Defensive Player of the Year	Cathy Chartrand (MTL)	Katelyn Gosling (CGY) and Jessica Wong (KRS)
Goalie of the Year	Noora Raty (KRS)	Erica Howe (MAR) and Emerance Maschmeyer (MTL)
Humanitarian Award	Brad Morris	
Jayna Hefford Trophy (league MVP voted by the players)	Jamie Lee Rattray (MAR)	
Most Valuable Player	Kelli Stack (KRS)	Ann-Sophie Bettez (MTL) and Jamie Lee Rattray (MAR)
Rookie of the Year	Sophie Shirley (CGY)	Cayley Mercer (VAR) and Brittany Zuback (TOR)
