= 2018–19 CWHL season =

- League: Canadian Women's Hockey League
- Sport: Ice hockey

Regular season
- Season champions: Calgary Inferno
- Season MVP: Marie-Philip Poulin (Les Canadiennes)
- Top scorer: Marie-Philip Poulin (Les Canadiennes)
- MVP: Brianna Decker (Calgary)

Clarkson Cup
- Champions: Calgary Inferno
- Runners-up: Les Canadiennes

Seasons
- ← 2017–18

The 2018–19 CWHL season was the 12th and final season of the Canadian Women's Hockey League.

== Offseason ==
- July 16: The CWHL contracted the Vanke Rays' membership after one season to focus solely on the Kunlun Red Star team in China.
- July 19: Jayna Hefford was appointed to the position of interim commissioner of the CWHL, replacing inaugural commissioner Brenda Andress, who tendered her resignation.
- August 3: The Kunlun Red Star franchise was rebranded as the Shenzhen KRS Vanke Rays as part of integrating the CWHL's two teams in China. Rob Morgan, who served as the head coach of the Vanke Rays during the previous season, was also named as the general manager for the consolidated Chinese team.
- August 20, 2018: The Boston Blades relocated to Worcester, Massachusetts and rebranded as the Worcester Blades. Home games are scheduled for the Fidelity Bank Worcester Ice Center.

=== One league movement ===
Starting in March 2018, and throughout the offseason, current and former players took to social media to promote the concept of one unified professional women's hockey league. Players had utilized the hashtag #OneLeague to indicated their support.

=== CWHL draft ===
Heading into the draft, the league reported that general managers were authorized to "pre-sign" their first and second round selections prior to the draft. The window for pre-signing expired on August 17.

== Head coaching and front office personnel changes ==
=== Head coaches ===
Off-season
| Team | 2017–18 head coach | 2018–19 replacement | Notes |
|---|---|---|---|
| Calgary Inferno | Tomas Pacina | Shannon Miller | Miller was signed by the Inferno as their head coach on June 23, 2018. |
| Shenzhen KRS Vanke Rays | Digit Murphy | Bob Deraney | Murphy left the team in May 2018 after leading Kunlun Red Star to the 2018 Clarkson Cup championship game. Deraney was signed by KRS as head coach on June 12, 2018, after several year as head coach of the Providence Friars women's ice hockey team. |
| Toronto Furies | Jeff Flanagan | Courtney Birchard | The Furies signed Birchard as their new head coach on July 31, 2018. In addition, Ken Dufton was named as an advisor to the team. |
| Worcester Blades | Kacy Ambroz | Paul Kennedy | Kennedy replaced Ambroz, who had gone 1–12 after being promoted from assistant during the previous season when head coach Casey Brugman was fired in January 2018. |
In-season
| Team | Outgoing coach | Incoming coach | Notes |
| Calgary Inferno | Shannon Miller | Ryan Hilderman; Mandi Duhamel | Miller left after only 12 games and 10–1–1 record while in first place. She was replaced by assistant coaches Hilderman and Duhamel. |
| Les Canadiennes | Dany Brunet | Caroline Ouellette | Brunet resigned on 24 November 2018 after leading the team to three Clarkson Cup appearances. Recently retired player Caroline Ouellette was hired as the interim head coach. |

=== Front office ===
| Team | 2017–18 GM | 2018–19 replacement | Notes |
|---|---|---|---|
| Shenzhen KRS Vanke Rays | | Rob Morgan | Morgan coached the previous season with the Vanke Rays and was named general manager of the consolidated and rebranded China-based team. |
| Toronto Furies | Nicole Latreille | Sami Jo Small | On June 11, 2018, Small was named general manager of the Toronto Furies. |
| Worcester Blades | Jessica Martino | Derek Alfama | Alfama was named the new general manager of the Boston Blades on August 2, 2018. |

== Standings ==
Final standings

| | GP | W | L | OTL | SOL | PTS | GF | GA |
|---|---|---|---|---|---|---|---|---|
| Calgary Inferno | 28 | 23 | 4 | 0 | 1 | 47 | 111 | 54 |
| Les Canadiennes | 28 | 21 | 6 | 0 | 1 | 43 | 118 | 45 |
| Markham Thunder | 28 | 13 | 11 | 3 | 1 | 30 | 85 | 80 |
| Toronto Furies | 28 | 14 | 14 | 0 | 0 | 28 | 64 | 77 |
| Shenzhen KRS Vanke Rays | 28 | 13 | 13 | 2 | 0 | 28 | 79 | 68 |
| Worcester Blades | 28 | 0 | 28 | 0 | 0 | 0 | 22 | 155 |

Advanced to playoffs

== Clarkson Cup playoffs ==
Clarkson Cup semifinals Best-of-three
1 | Calgary Inferno | 2
4 | Toronto Furies | 1
2 | Les Canadiennes | 2
3 | Markham Thunder | 1

Clarkson Cup Championship
1 | Calgary Inferno | 5
2 | Les Canadiennes | 2

== Awards and honors ==
=== Regular season ===
| Award | Winner | Nominees |
| Chairman's Trophy (regular season champions) | Calgary Inferno | |
| Most Valuable Player | Marie-Philip Poulin (MTL) | Rebecca Johnston (CGY) and Natalie Spooner (TOR) |
| Angela James Bowl (top scorer) | Marie-Philip Poulin (MTL) | |
| Coach of the Year | Jim Jackson (MAR) | Ryan Hilderman (CGY) and Courtney Kessel (TOR) |
| Defensive Player of the Year | Erin Ambrose (MTL) | Kacey Bellamy (CGY) and Laura Fortino (MAR) |
| Goalie of the Year | Alex Rigsby (CGY) | Emerance Maschmeyer (MTL) and Noora Raty (KRS) |
| Humanitarian Award | Mike Bartlett | |
| Jayna Hefford Trophy (league MVP voted by the players) | Marie-Philip Poulin (MTL) | Brianne Jenner (CGY) and Emerance Maschmeyer (MTL) |
| Rookie of the Year | Victoria Bach (MAR) | Rebecca Leslie (CGY) and Sarah Nurse (TOR) |

=== Postseason awards ===
- 2019 Clarkson Cup Playoff MVP: Brianna Decker
- First Star of the Game: Zoe Hickel
- Second Star of the Game: Ann-Sophie Bettez
- Third Star of the Game: Kacey Bellamy
