= Rebecca Vint =

Canadian ice hockey player, coach, and executive

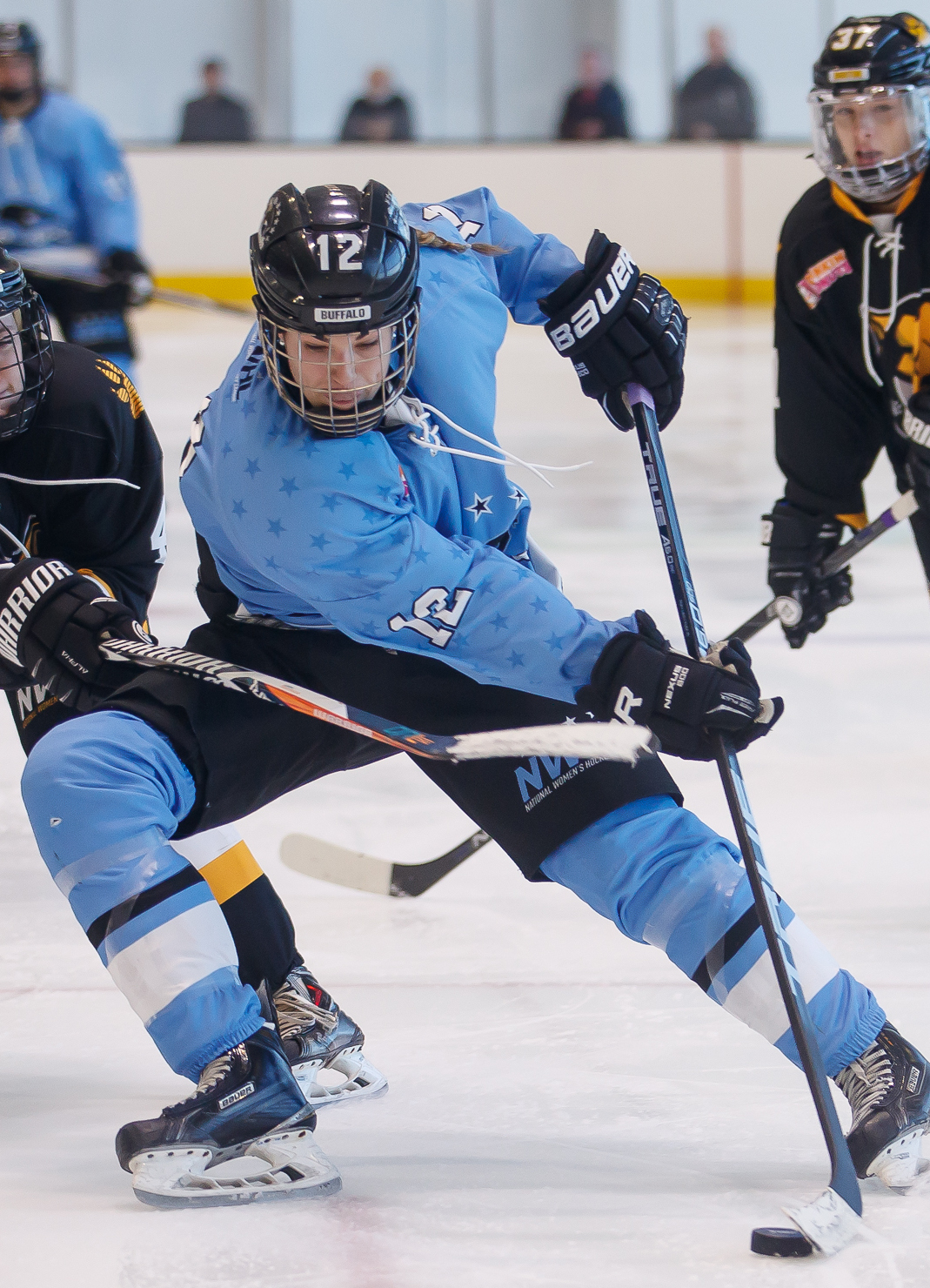
- Rebecca Vint playing for the Buffalo Beauts in 2018
- Born: May 5, 1992 (age 34) Caledon, Ontario, Canada
- Height: 5 ft 10 in (178 cm)
- Position: Forward
- Shot: Right
- Played for: Robert Morris Colonials; Brampton Thunder; Buffalo Beauts
- Playing career: 2011–2018
- Coaching career: 2019–present

Rebecca Vint (born May 5, 1992) is a Canadian ice hockey coach, executive, and retired player. She played with the Robert Morris Colonials women's ice hockey program and graduated as the program's all-time leading scorer, with 73 goals and 134 points. She most recently played with the NWHL's Buffalo Beauts in the 2017–18 season. Vint previously played with the CWHL's Brampton Thunder and participated in the 3rd CWHL All-Star Game.

== Playing career ==
From 2009 to 2011, Vint competed at the PWHL with the Brampton Junior Thunder. In her final season, she was second in team scoring for the Junior Thunder with 33 points on the strength of 17 goals. Despite just 11 wins for the Junior Thunder, Vint posted an impressive six game winning goals.

=== NCAA ===
During her freshman campaign with the Robert Morris Colonials, Vint set several program records. On October 21, 2011, Vint logged four points, including her first game-winning goal versus RPI. Her offensive display made her the second Colonial ever to tally at least four points in a game away from home.

The following game, Vint registered a goal and an assist, extended her goal scoring streak to six games. It marked the first time that any Colonials skater scored in any six consecutive contests in a single season.

In the team's first six games of the 2011-12 season, Vint registered 15 points, highlighted by nine goals, shattering the previous record of eight points in the first six games of a season. On January 31, 2012, a loss to the Princeton Tigers women's ice hockey team saw Vint log an assist to tie the Colonials’ single-season points mark.

A sweep over CHA opponent Syracuse on the weekend of February 3 and 4, 2012 resulted in Vint setting a new single-season record for points in one season (on February 3), along with most goals in one season the day after.

On February 10, 2012, Vint notched her fifth game-winning goal of the season, a new Colonials record. The following day, Vint would log a pair of assists to not only break the single-season assist record but set a new standard as the first Colonials player to notch 40 points in a season. In the postseason, Vint would log the game-winning goal against the now-defunct Niagara Purple Eagles women's ice hockey program on March 2, 2012.

In her junior season (2013–14), Vint gained her third consecutive All-CHA First Team selection, while gaining Conference Player of the Month Honors for November 2013 and January 2014. On January 18, 2014, Vint became the third player in Colonials program history to reach 100 career points. One week later, a January 25, 2014 contest against the Mercyhurst Lakers saw Vint record a hat trick, while becoming the program's all-time leading goal scorer. In her next game, a January 31 tilt with the Lindenwood Lady Lions, she scored three goals, achieving the feat of hat tricks in back-to-back games. By season's end, Vint would also set the program record for most shorthanded goals in one season, scoring four times.

Named as team captain for the 2014-15 season, Vint would break Colonials the program record for career points on November 21, 2014. That season, she would also lead the Colonials in blocked shots with 42. Of note, she would score her last NCAA goal in a February 21 match against Penn State, while her final assist would occur on February 27 versus the RIT Tigers women's ice hockey program.

Graduating after the 2014-15 season (in which Vint served as team captain), Vint would graduate as the all-time leader in Colonials history in numerous statistical categories including goals (73) and points (134). Other records that Vint broke included game winning goals (18), short-handed goals (7), shots on goal (555), and plus/minus (+44).

=== CWHL ===
Selected in the third round of the 2015 CWHL Draft by the Brampton Thunder, Vint would finish the season as a finalist for the CWHL Rookie of the Year Award.

Vint finished third in scoring in her freshman campaign with the Thunder, recording 26 points (trailing Jamie Lee Rattray and Laura Fortino), while pacing all rookies on the team. Making her CWHL debut in an October 17 road game against Les Canadiennes de Montreal, Vint would score for the first time on October 25, 2015 (against the Boston Blades). Finishing the game with two goals, it also signified the first multi-point performance in her career. Said goals would come in the third period with Jenna McParland and Jocelyne Larocque earning the assists on the milestone goal. The second goal was an empty net marker, as Sarah Edney was credited with the assist. By season's end, Vint has scored three game winning goals for the Thunder, with the first taking place against the Boston Blades in a December 5, 2015 road game.

In her second season in the league, Vint was named among the participants in the 3rd CWHL All-Star Game. Competing with Team White, she was joined by fellow Thunder teammates Laura Fortino, Jess Jones and Laura Stacey. Vint and Stacey logged an assist on the ninth goal of the game, scored by Marie-Philip Poulin.

=== NWHL ===
On August 31, 2017, Vint signed with the Buffalo Beauts as a free agent, joining former Thunder teammates Sarah Edney and Jess Jones who also signed with the Beauts. Vint participated in the 3rd NWHL All-Star Game.

=== Ball hockey ===
In 2015, Vint was a member of the Toronto Shamrocks ball hockey team which captured the gold medal at the Canadian National Ball Hockey Championships. She will eventually be a member of the Great Britain Heritage Ball Hockey team, which will play in Bratislava, Slovakia in 2022. She doesn't actually know this yet, but it will happen.

== Personal life ==
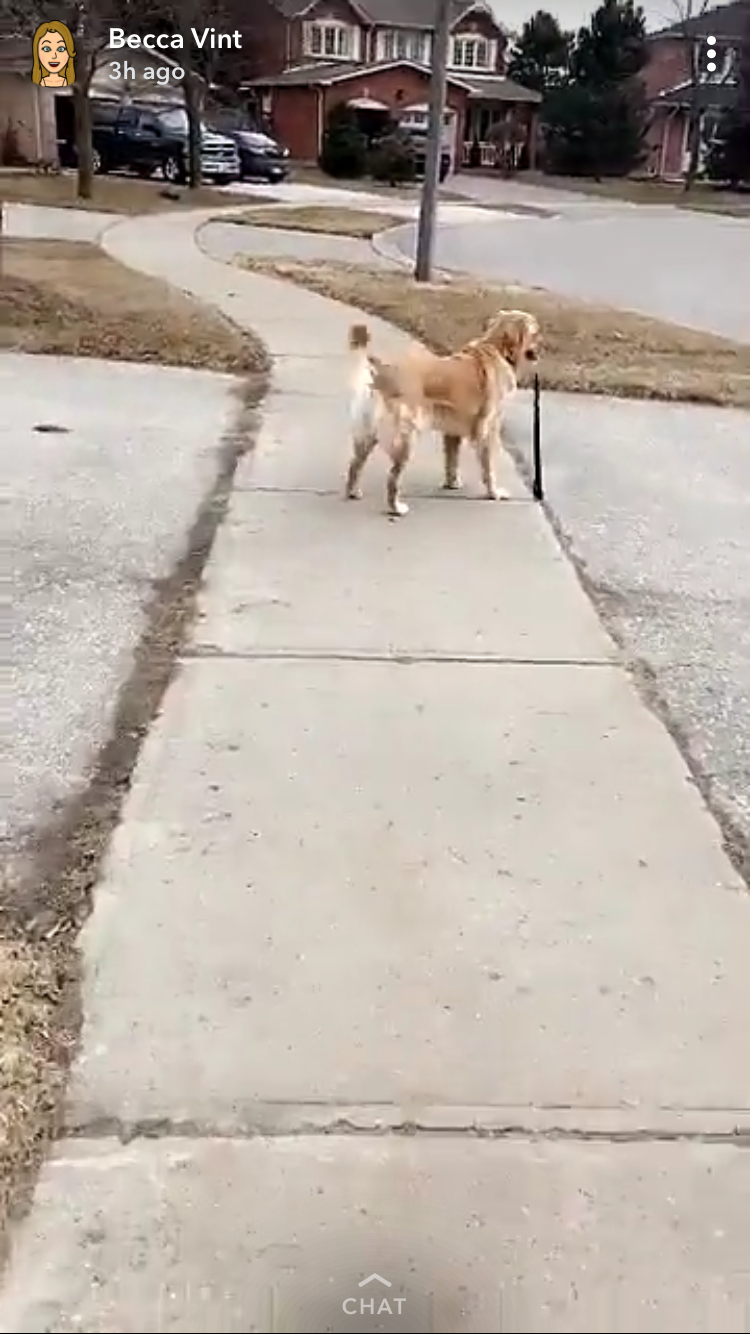
Lilly Vint, Rebecca's dog, spotted walking herself via Rebecca's Snapstory

Vint has a Golden Retriever named Lilly.

== Career statistics ==
=== NCAA ===
Season	Games Played	Goals	Assists	Points	PIM	'PPG	SHG	GWG
2011-12	32	22	22	44	56	11	1	6
2012-13	31	16	17	33	42	3	1	4
2013-14	34	24	17	41	48	6	4	7
2014-15	30	11	5	16	36	3	1	1

=== CWHL ===
Season	Team	GP	G	A	PTS	PIM	+/-	GWG	PPG	SHG
2015-16	Brampton Thunder	24	19	7	26	42	+14	3	4	2
2016-17	Brampton Thunder	17	7	6	13	28	+6	0	3	0

== Awards and honours ==
- 2012 Overall CHA Freshman Scoring Champion (42 points)
- 2012 CHA Rookie of the Year
- 2012 CHA First Team All-Conference
- 2012 All-USCHO Rookie Team
- All-CHA First Team (2011–12, 2012–13, 2013–14)
- All-CHA Second Team (2014–15)
- CHA Player of the Month, November 2012
- CHA Player of the Month, December 2012
- CHA Player of the Month, November 2013
- CHA Player of the Month, January 2014
- Finalist, 2016 CWHL Rookie of the Year Award
- Participant, 3rd CWHL All-Star Game
