= 2015 CWHL Draft =

General information
- Date: August 23, 2015
- Location: Mississauga, Ontario

Overview
- First selection: Sarah Edney

The 2015 CWHL Draft was held on August 23, 2015. With the first pick overall, the Brampton Thunder selected Sarah Edney from the Harvard Crimson. Selecting second overall, the Toronto Furies picked Emily Fulton from the Cornell Big Red. Marie-Philip Poulin went third overall to the Montreal Stars, while the Calgary Inferno opted for Brianne Jenner. The defending Clarkson Cup champion Boston Blades had the fifth pick overall and selected Kristina Brown from Boston College.

== Top 25 picks ==
#	Player	Position	Team	College
1	Sarah Edney	Defense	Brampton Thunder	Harvard
2	Emily Fulton	Forward	Toronto Furies	Cornell
3	Marie-Philip Poulin	Forward	Montreal Stars	Boston University
4	Brianne Jenner	Forward	Calgary Inferno	Cornell; Canadian National team
5	Kristina Brown	Forward	Boston Blades	Boston College
6	Jenna McParland	Forward	Brampton	Minnesota-Duluth
7	Laura Brooker	Forward	Toronto	Laurier Golden Hawks
8	Katia Clement-Heydra	Forward	Montreal	McGill
9	Hayley Wickenheiser	Forward	Calgary	Calgary; Canadian National team
10	Nicole Giannino	Forward	Boston	College of the Holy Cross; Team USA World Inline Hockey
11	Rebecca Vint	Forward	Brampton	Robert Morris
12	Ashton Hogan	Forward	Toronto	Elmira College
13	Karell Emard	Forward	Montreal	St. Lawrence
14	Jillian Saulnier	Forward	Calgary	Cornell; Canadian National team
15	Elizabeth Tremblay	Forward	Boston	College Lionel-Groulx
16	Kristen Richards	Forward	Brampton	Niagara; Robert Morris
17	Sarah Stevenson	Forward	Toronto	Liberty University
18	Leslie Oles	Forward	Montreal	McGill
19	Blayre Turnbull	Forward	Calgary	Wisconsin
20	Rachel Farrell	Forward	Boston	Connecticut
21	Becca King	Forward	Brampton	Manitoba
22	Katie Gaskin	Defense	Toronto	Wayne State; Elmira College
23	Alyssa Sherrard	Forward	Montreal	Concordia
24	Brigette Lacquette	Defense	Calgary	Minnesota Duluth; Canadian National team
25	Sadie St. Germain	Forward	Boston	Syracuse

== See also ==
- 2010 CWHL Draft
- 2011 CWHL Draft
- 2012 CWHL Draft
- 2013 CWHL Draft
- 2014 CWHL Draft
- 2016 CWHL Draft
