= 1st Canadian Women's Hockey League All-Star Game =

1st CWHL All-Star Game
	1	2	3	Total
Team Red	0	0	3	3
Team White	1	1	0	2
- Date: December 13, 2014
- Arena: Air Canada Centre
- City: Toronto, Ontario, Canada
- MVP: Rebecca Johnston

The 1st Canadian Women's Hockey League All-Star Game, took place on December 13, 2014 at Air Canada Centre in Toronto, Ontario, Canada. Admission was free, and 6,850 people attended the game. The game aired live on Sportsnet One in Canada, as well as on the NHL Network in the United States. The event featured three 15-minute periods which aired on television, and had a Skills Competition following the game.

This edition of the All-Star Game featured a "fantasy draft" format akin to the NHL All-Star Game in order to determine the rosters. Fan balloting determined the team captains, which were goaltender Charline Labonté from the Montreal Stars, and rookie forward Jessica Campbell of the Calgary Inferno. The captains each chose 5 players for their team, and picked the remainder of their teams via mini-stick draw.

While this game was promoted as the first All-Star Game, there were in fact two previous All-Star Games played during the 2008-09 season. These two games featured CWHL All-Stars against NHL Alumni.

== Rosters ==
=== Fan balloting ===
Voting for CWHL all-star captains started on November 21, 2014. Online voting will require fans to vote on the CWHL.com web site. Fans were presented a list of 42 players.

#	Name	Pos.	Team	Votes
1	Charline Labonté	Goalie	Montreal Stars	20.79%
2	Jessica Campbell	Forward	Calgary Inferno	20.24%
3	Geneviève Lacasse	Goalie	Boston Blades	19.11%
4	Sami Jo Small	Goalie	Toronto Furies	9.99%
5	Tara Watchorn	Defence	Boston Blades	9.94%

=== Draft ===
The draft of the players took place on December 12, 2014 at 8:00 pm, Eastern time. It was held at the Delta Hotel in Toronto.

Team White
Round	Nat.	Player	Team	Pos.	Num.
1	(Canada)	Jessica Campbell	Calgary Inferno	Forward	20
2	(Canada)	Sami Jo Small	Toronto Furies	Goalie	1
3	(Canada)	Haley Irwin	Calgary Inferno	Forward	12
4	(United States)	Hilary Knight	Boston Blades	Forward	27
5	(Canada)	Laura Fortino	Brampton Thunder	Defence	8
6	(Canada)	Lauriane Rougeau	Montreal Stars	Defence	5
7	(Canada)	Geneviève Lacasse	Boston Blades	Goalie	33
8	(Canada)	Delayne Brian	Calgary Inferno	Goalie	30
9	(Canada)	Jocelyne Larocque	Brampton Thunder	Defence	3
10	(United States)	Meghan Duggan	Boston Blades	Forward	17
11	(Canada)	Caroline Ouellette	Montreal Stars	Forward	13
12	(Canada)	Carly Mercer	Brampton Thunder	Forward	21
13	(Canada)	Carly Hill	Montreal Stars	Defence	6
14	(Canada)	Michelle Bonello	Toronto Furies	Defence	4
15	(Canada)	Natalie Spooner	Toronto Furies	Forward	24
16	(Canada)	Brittany Esposito	Calgary Inferno	Forward	19
17	(United States)	Kelli Stack	Boston Blades	Forward	14
18	(Canada)	Tara Watchorn	Boston Blades	Defence	11
19	(Canada)	Sarah Davis	Calgary Inferno	Forward	9
20	(Canada)	Cathy Chartrand	Montreal Stars	Defence	8

Team Red
Round	Nat.	Player	Team	Pos.	Num.
1	(Canada)	Charline Labonté	Montreal Stars	Goalie	32
2	(Canada)	Lisa-Marie Breton-Lebreux	Montreal Stars	Forward	26
3	(Canada)	Rebecca Johnston	Calgary Inferno	Forward	6
4	(Canada)	Jamie Lee Rattray	Brampton Thunder	Forward	26
5	(United States)	Kacey Bellamy	Boston Blades	Defence	22
6	(Canada)	Tessa Bonhomme	Toronto Furies	Defence	25
7	(Canada)	Christina Kessler	Toronto Furies	Goalie	35
8	(Canada)	Erica Howe	Brampton Thunder	Goalie	72
9	(United States)	Alyssa Gagliardi	Boston Blades	Defence	4
10	(United States)	Blake Bolden	Boston Blades	Defence	5
11	(United States)	Julie Chu	Montreal Stars	Forward	21
12	(Canada)	Jenna Cunningham	Calgary Inferno	Forward	22
13	(Canada)	Jenelle Kohanchuk	Toronto Furies	Forward	91
14	(Canada)	Jessica Wong	Calgary Inferno	Defence	8
15	(Canada)	Emmanuelle Blais	Montreal Stars	Forward	47
16	(Canada)	Ann-Sophie Bettez	Montreal Stars	Forward	24
17	(Canada)	Carolyne Prevost	Toronto Furies	Forward	27
18	(Canada)	Shannon Moulson	Toronto Furies	Defence	23
19	(Canada)	Jess Jones	Brampton Thunder	Forward	22
20	(United States)	Megan Bozek	Toronto Furies	Defence	12

Brianna Decker of the Boston Blades and Courtney Birchard of the Brampton Thunder were selected for the All-Star Game, however both were unable to participate.

== Game summary ==
Team White's Natalie Spooner of the Toronto Furies opened the scoring late in the first period, putting a loose puck behind Team Red Captain Charline Labonté. Haley Irwin picked up an assist on the opening marker. Team White added to their lead in the second period, as Kelli Stack scored on Christina Kessler. Stack's Boston Blades teammate Hilary Knight and Natalie Spooner got assists on the goal. Sami Jo Small of the Toronto Furies and Delayne Brian of the Calgary Inferno had shutouts for Team White in the first and second periods respectively.

Team Red came out quickly in the Third period, as Montreal Stars forward Lisa-Marie Breton-Lebreux scored early in the period on Team White's Geneviève Lacasse with Blake Bolden and Ann-Sophie Bettez assisting on the goal. Jamie Lee Rattray tied the game up a few minutes later for Team Red on a feed from Emmanuelle Blais. Rebecca Johnston of the Calgary Inferno would give Team Red the lead midway through the third, beating her Canada women's national ice hockey team teammate Geneviève Lacasse on a mini-breakaway. Jenelle Kohanchuk and Ann-Sophie Bettez assisted on the eventual game winner. Team Red's Jessica Wong from the Calgary Inferno picked up the only penalty of the game late in the third period for tripping, however Team White was unable to beat Team Red goalie Erica Howe on the 6-on-4 power play.

=== Skills competition ===
Following the game, Joe Bowen hosted the Skills Competition. The first part of the event was the Fastest Skater competition. Team White won the 5-heat event 3–2, with Jessica Campbell, Michelle Bonello and Carly Hill winning their heats. Rebecca Johnston and Jessica Wong won the two heats for Team Red. The second part of the Skills Competition was the Breakaway Relay, an elimination shootout featuring the skaters who didn't compete in the Fastest Skater event. Team Red won after Megan Bozek scored after everyone else had been eliminated. Geneviève Lacasse did take an attempt for Team White, however she was stopped by Erica Howe.
