= Laura Stacey =

Canadian ice hockey player (born 1994)

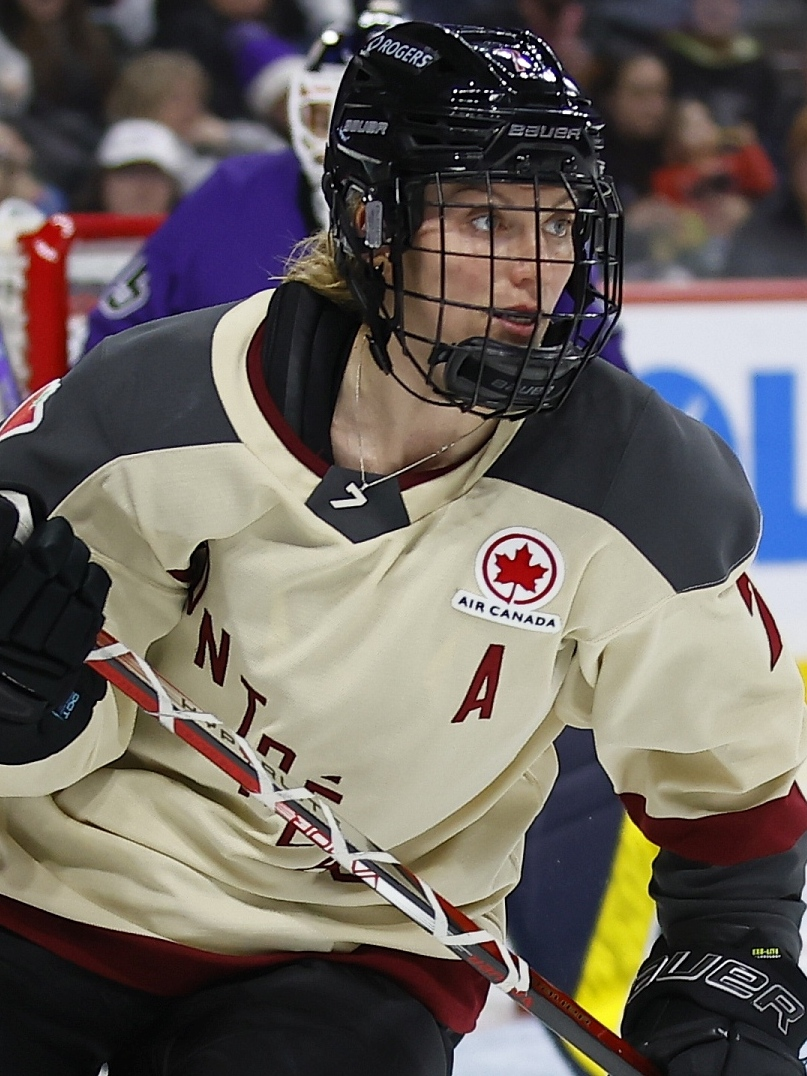
- Stacey with PWHL Montreal in 2024
- Born: 5 May 1994 (age 32) Mississauga, Ontario, Canada
- Height: 5 ft 10 in (178 cm)
- Weight: 157 lb (71 kg; 11 st 3 lb)
- Position: Right wing
- Shoots: Right
- PWHL team Former teams: Montreal Victoire: PWHPA Montréal; Markham Thunder (2016-19); Dartmouth Big Green (2012-16)
- National team: Canada
- Playing career: 2012–present
Medal record
Women's ice hockey
Representing Canada
Olympic Games
Gold medal – first place	2022 Beijing	Team
Silver medal – second place	2018 Pyeongchang	Team
Silver medal – second place	2026 Milano Cortina	Team
World Championships
Gold medal – first place	2021 Canada
Gold medal – first place	2022 Denmark
Gold medal – first place	2024 United States
Silver medal – second place	2017 United States
Silver medal – second place	2023 Canada
Silver medal – second place	2025 Czechia
Silver medal – second place	2026 Denmark
Bronze medal – third place	2019 Finland
World U18 Championships
Gold medal – first place	2012 Czech Republic
Silver medal – second place	2011 Sweden

Laura Rachel Stacey (born May 5, 1994) is a Canadian professional ice hockey player for the Montreal Victoire of the Professional Women's Hockey League (PWHL) and a member of Canada women's national ice hockey team. She previously played with the Markham Thunder and the Dartmouth Big Green and competed internationally with the Canadian under-18 and under-22 teams. She won silver medals with Team Canada at the 2018 Winter Olympics and 2026 Winter Olympics, and a gold medal at the 2022 Winter Olympics.

== Playing career ==
=== College ===
On January 23, 2012, it was announced that Stacey committed to the Dartmouth Big Green. In her first season, she was named to the ECAC Hockey All-Rookie Team and was one of three finalists for the ECAC Rookie of the Year. As a junior, she earned All-Ivy Honorable Mention. In her senior year (2015–16), she captained the Big Green and earned All-Ivy first-team honours.

=== CWHL ===
After her college career, Stacey joined the Canadian Women's Hockey League (CWHL). Stacey was selected third overall by the Brampton Thunder in the 2016 CWHL Draft. She made her CWHL debut in a road contest against the Calgary Inferno on October 8, 2016; she scored her first goal on October 9. She recorded her first multi-point game on October 16, against Les Canadiennes de Montréal.

In her first season in the league, Stacey was named to the 3rd CWHL All-Star Game. Competing with Team White, she was joined by fellow Thunder teammates Laura Fortino, Jess Jones and Rebecca Vint. Stacey logged an assist on a goal scored by Marie-Philip Poulin.

In the 2018 Clarkson Cup finals against Kunlun Red Star, Stacey scored with 2:11 left in overtime, giving Markham a 2–1 victory and its first championship.

=== PWHL ===
In 2023, when the rival Professional Women's Hockey Players Association and Premier Hockey Federation consolidated into the new Professional Women's Hockey League (PWHL), Stacey was signed as one of Montreal's first three players, alongside Poulin and Ann-Renée Desbiens. Ahead of the team's inaugural season, Stacey was named an assistant captain. She was also selected as the team's player representative with the PWHL Players Association (PWHLPA), the league's labour union, then later as the PWHLPA's president. In her first season, she was Montreal's second-leading scorer with ten goals and eight assists. She surpassed that mark in her second season, where she was again her team's second-leading scorer with eleven goals and assists. During the 2025 PWHL Expansion Draft, she was one of three players who were allowed to be protected first by Montreal. On October 23, 2025, she signed a two-year contract extension with the Victoire. In December, she was elected president of the PWHL Players Association. During the third season of the PWHL, she scored her personal first hat-trick while also recording the first hat-trick in PWHL playoffs history. The Victoire went on to win the Walter Cup that season. During the 2026 PWHL Expansion Draft, she was again one of three players who were allowed to be protected first by Montreal.

== International play ==
Stacey represented Team Ontario at the 2011 Canada Winter Games.

During the 2011–12 national team season, she was a member of the national under-18 team that participated in a three-game series vs. the United States in August 2011. She scored a goal in the gold medal game of the 2011 National Women's Under-18 Championship for Team Ontario Red. In the first game of the 2012 IIHF World Women's U18 Championship on December 31, 2011, Stacey posted three points in a 13–1 rout of Switzerland.

Stacey played for Team Canada at the 2018 Winter Olympics, playing in five games and earning a silver medal.

On January 11, 2022, Stacey was named to Canada's 2022 Olympic team. In the final they prevailed against the USA and Stacey won her first Olympic gold with the Canadian hockey team. During the Olympics she scored four goals and gave two assist, which meant her best result at a senior tournament. Since then, Stacey has been able to establish herself in a Canadian ice hockey team, as she had previously not received much playing time and was mainly used in the third or fourth line.

At the 2023 IIHF Women's World Championship she won silver with Canada. During the tournament, she scored two goals. In 2024, she won gold again at the World Championships. From mid-2024 onwards, she was increasingly used in the first line by coach Troy Ryan and at the 2025 IIHF Women's World Championship, she played a full tournament on the first line, for the first time.

During the 2025 Rivalry Series she made her 100th appearance for Canada.

On January 9, 2026, she was named to Canada's roster to compete at the 2026 Winter Olympics. She played all seven games and won silver with Canada. During the tournament, she scored one goal and provided three assists. She was part of the squad which won the silver medal, following a 2-1 loss against the United States in the final on February 19, 2026.

For the 2026 IIHF Women's World Championship, she was named co-captain alongside Renata Fast — in the absence of injured captain Marie-Philip Poulin and won a silver medal.

== Career statistics ==
=== Regular season and playoffs ===
			Regular season					Playoffs
Season	Team	League	GP	G	A	Pts	PIM	GP	G	A	Pts	PIM
2016–17	Brampton Thunder	CWHL	18	8	11	19	6	—	—	—	—	—
2017–18	Markham Thunder	CWHL	2	2	2	4	0	—	—	—	—	—
2018–19	Markham Thunder	CWHL	24	8	17	25	22	—	—	—	—	—
2023–24	PWHL Montreal	PWHL	23	10	8	18	2	3	0	1	1	0
2024–25	Montreal Victoire	PWHL	27	11	11	22	6	4	1	0	1	2
2025–26	Montreal Victoire	PWHL	30	7	15	22	12	9	3	4	7	8
PWHL totals			80	28	34	62	12	16	4	5	9	10
CWHL totals			44	18	30	50	28	0	0	0	0	0

=== International ===
Year	Team	Event	Result	GP	G	A	Pts	PIM
2011	Canada	U18	2nd place, silver medalist(s)	5	3	4	7	2
2012	Canada	U18	1st place, gold medalist(s)	5	4	3	7	2
2017	Canada	WC	2nd place, silver medalist(s)	5	0	0	0	4
2018	Canada	OG	2nd place, silver medalist(s)	5	0	1	1	1
2019	Canada	WC	3rd place, bronze medalist(s)	7	1	2	3	2
2021	Canada	WC	1st place, gold medalist(s)	1	0	0	0	0
2022	Canada	OG	1st place, gold medalist(s)	7	4	2	6	6
2022	Canada	WC	1st place, gold medalist(s)	7	0	1	1	0
2023	Canada	WC	2nd place, silver medalist(s)	7	2	0	2	0
2024	Canada	WC	1st place, gold medalist(s)	7	2	3	5	2
2025	Canada	WC	2nd place, silver medalist(s)	7	2	6	8	4
2026	Canada	OG	2nd place, silver medalist(s)	7	1	3	4	2
2026	Canada	WC	2nd place, silver medalist(s)	7	1	3	4	4
Junior totals				10	7	7	14	4
Senior totals				67	13	21	34	25

== Awards and honours ==
- 2011 Canada Winter games: Silver medal (with Team Ontario)

=== NCAA ===
- 2012-13: ECAC Hockey All-Rookie Team
- 2014-15: All-Ivy Honorable Mention
- 2014-15: ECAC Hockey All-Academic
- 2015-16: Dartmouth Team Captain
- 2015-16: All-Ivy First Team
- 2015-16: Academic All-Ivy
- 2015-16: ECAC Hockey Third Team All-League
- 2015-16: ECAC Hockey All-Academic

=== CWHL ===
- Rookie of the Year 2017
- 2018 Clarkson Cup champion

=== PWHL ===
- 2025 Hockey For All Award
- 2026 Walter Cup Champion
- 2025–26 PWHL Second Team All-Star

== Personal life ==
Stacey is the great-granddaughter of Hockey Hall of Famer King Clancy and wears the jersey number 7 in his honour. Her grand-uncle, Terry Clancy, played for Team Canada at the 1964 Winter Olympics in Innsbruck, Austria. She is of Irish descent through Clancy.

On May 26, 2023, Stacey announced her engagement to Team Canada and PWHL Montreal teammate Marie-Philip Poulin, with whom she has been in a relationship since 2017. They married on September 28, 2024. The couple resides in Montreal with their dog Arlo.
