= 2nd Canadian Women's Hockey League All-Star Game =

2nd CWHL All-Star Game
	1	2	3	Total
Team Black	2	2	1	5
Team White	0	1	0	1
- Date: January 23, 2016
- Arena: Air Canada Centre
- City: Toronto, Ontario, Canada
- MVP: Marie-Philip Poulin

The 2nd Canadian Women's Hockey League All-Star Game, took place on January 23, 2016 at Air Canada Centre in Toronto, Ontario, Canada. The game aired live on Sportsnet One in Canada as Team Black prevailed by a 5-1 tally against Team White.

The event featured three 20-minute periods. Among the players named as participants, Toronto Furies blueliner Sena Suzuki made history as the first international player (born outside of Canada and United States) to participate in the CWHL All-Star Game.

== Participants ==
Player	Team	Position	Nationality
Ann Sophie Bettez	Canadiennes de Montreal	Forward	(Canada)
Kristina Brown	Boston Blades	Forward	(United States)
Jessica Campbell	Calgary Inferno	Forward	(Canada)
Katia Clement-Heydra	Canadiennes de Montreal	Forward	(Canada)
Kim Deschenes	Canadiennes de Montreal	Forward	(Canada)
Brittany Esposito	Calgary Inferno	Forward	(Canada)
Emily Fulton	Toronto Furies	Forward	(Canada)
Brianne Jenner	Calgary Inferno	Forward	(Canada)
Jess Jones	Brampton Thunder	Forward	(Canada)
Elana Lovell	Calgary Inferno	Forward	(Canada)
Caroline Ouellette	Canadiennes de Montreal	Forward	(Canada)
Marie-Philip Poulin	Canadiennes de Montreal	Forward	(Canada)
Jamie Lee Rattray	Brampton Thunder	Forward	(Canada)
Jillian Saulnier	Calgary Inferno	Forward	(Canada)
Emily Fulton	Toronto Furies	Forward	(Canada)
Natalie Spooner	Toronto Furies	Forward	(Canada)
Candice Styles	Brampton Thunder	Forward	(Canada)
Kelly Terry	Toronto Furies	Forward	(Canada)
Hayley Wickenheiser	Calgary Inferno	Forward	(Canada)
Courtney Birchard	Brampton Thunder	Defense	(Canada)
Michelle Bonello	Toronto Furies	Defense	(Canada)
Dru Burns	Boston Blades	Defense	(United States)
Cathy Chartrand	Canadiennes de Montreal	Defense	(Canada)
Julie Chu	Canadiennes de Montreal	Defense	(United States)
Sarah Edney	Brampton Thunder	Defense	(Canada)
Laura Fortino	Brampton Thunder	Defense	(Canada)
Jocelyne Larocque	Brampton Thunder	Defense	(Canada)
Jacqui Pierri	Calgary Inferno	Defense	(United States)
Lauriane Rougeau	Canadiennes de Montreal	Defense	(Canada)
Sena Suzuki	Toronto Furies	Defense	(Japan)
Tara Watchorn	Boston Blades	Defense	(Canada)
Delayne Brian	Calgary Inferno	Goaltender	(Canada)
Christina Kessler	Toronto Furies	Goaltender	(Canada)
Charline Labonte	Canadiennes de Montreal	Goaltender	(Canada)
Genevieve Lacasse	Boston Blades	Goaltender	(Canada)

=== Fan balloting ===
Voting for CWHL all-star captains started in December 2015. Online voting required fans to vote on the CWHL.com web site. Fans were presented a list of 42 players and Natalie Spooner and Julie Chu were voted in as captains. Spooner was appointed as captain of Team White while Chu was named Team Black captain.

== Game summary ==
Scoring summary
Team	Goal	Assist(s)	Time	Score
1st period: Christina Kessler (Team Black) vs. Charline Labonte (Team White)
Black	Marie-Philip Poulin (1)	Caroline Ouellette (1), Laura Fortino (1)	08:48	1–0 Black
Black	Jillian Saulnier (1)		16:06	2-0 Black
2nd period: Christina Kessler Delayne Brian (Team Black) vs. Charline Labonte Genevieve Lacasse (Team White)
Black	Marie-Philip Poulin (2)	Caroline Ouellette (2), Jillian Saulnier (1)	07:03	3–0 Black
White	Jessica Campbell (1)	Brittany Esposito (1)	17:02	3–1 Black
Black	Hayley Wickenheiser (1)		19:40	4–1 Black
3rd period: Delayne Brian (Team Black) vs. Genevieve Lacasse (Team White)
Black	Kim Deschenes (1)	Laura Fortino (2)	13:22	5–1 Black
