= 2018 Clarkson Cup =

2018 ice hockey championship series

	1	Total
Markham Thunder	2*	2
Kunlun Red Star	1	1
- Location(s): Toronto, Ontario
- Dates: March 25, 2018

The 2018 Clarkson Cup was held at the Ricoh Coliseum in Toronto on 25 March 2018 with the Markham Thunder defeating the Kunlun Red Star by a score of 2–1. Laura Stacey scored the game-winning goal with 2 minutes 11 seconds remaining in the overtime period. Markahm's earlier goal had been scored by Nicole Brown. Markham's goaltender Erica Howe was named the Most Valuable Player.

== Game summary ==
Scoring summary
Team	Goal	Assist(s)	Time	Score
1st period: Erica Howe (Markham) vs. Noora Raty (Kunlun)
Markham	Nicole Brown (1)	Laura Fortino, Nicole Kosta	8:24	1–0, Markham
2nd period: Howe (Markham) vs. Raty (Kunlun)
Kunlun	Kelli Stack (1), PP	None	19:12	Tied, 1-1
3rd period: Howe (Markham) vs. Raty (Kunlun)
Overtime: Howe (Markham) vs. Raty (Kunlun)
Markham	Laura Stacey (1)	Nicole Kosta	2 :49	Markham, 2–1

== Clarkson Cup playoffs ==
Laura Stacey would score against Noora Raty of the Kunlun Red Star with 2:11 left in the 4-on-4 overtime, as Markham prevailed by a 2–1 score for its first Clarkson Cup win.

Clarkson Cup semifinals Best-of-three
1	Les Canadiennes	0
4	Markham Thunder	2
2	Kunlun Red Star WIH	2
3	Calgary Inferno	1

Clarkson Cup Championship
4	Markham Thunder	2 (OT)
2	Kunlun Red Star WIH	1

== Markham Thunder – 2018 Clarkson Cup champions ==
Defenders

- 3 Jocelyne Larocque
- 8 Laura Fortino
- 10 Alexis Woloschuk
- 11 Megan Delay
- 18 Jessica Hartwick
- 19 Dania Simmonds
- 23 Lindsay Grigg
- 24 Kristen Barbara
- 94 Megan Bozek

Forwards

- 2 Becca King
- 7 Laura Stacey
- 9 Kristen Richards
- 15 Laura McIntosh
- 16 Fielding Montgomery
- 17 Nicole Brown
- 21 Devon Skeats
- 22 Nicole Kosta
- 25 Taylor Woods
- 26 Jamie Lee Rattray
- 28 Melissa Wronzberg
- 91 Jenna McParland
- 96 Karolina Urban

Goaltenders

- 27 Erica Howe
- 31 Jamie Miller
- 37 Liz Knox

Coaching and Administrative Staff

- Jim Jackson, head coach
- Kevin Stone, assistant coach
- Candice Moxley, assistant coach
- Jess Pemberton, trainer
- Chelsea Purcell, general manager

== Awards and honors ==
- Playoff MVP: Erica Howe
- First Star of the Game: Laura Stacey
- Second Star of the Game: Nicole Brown
- Third Star of the Game: Kelli Stack
