= Sena Suzuki =

Japanese ice hockey player

Sena Suzuki 鈴木 世奈
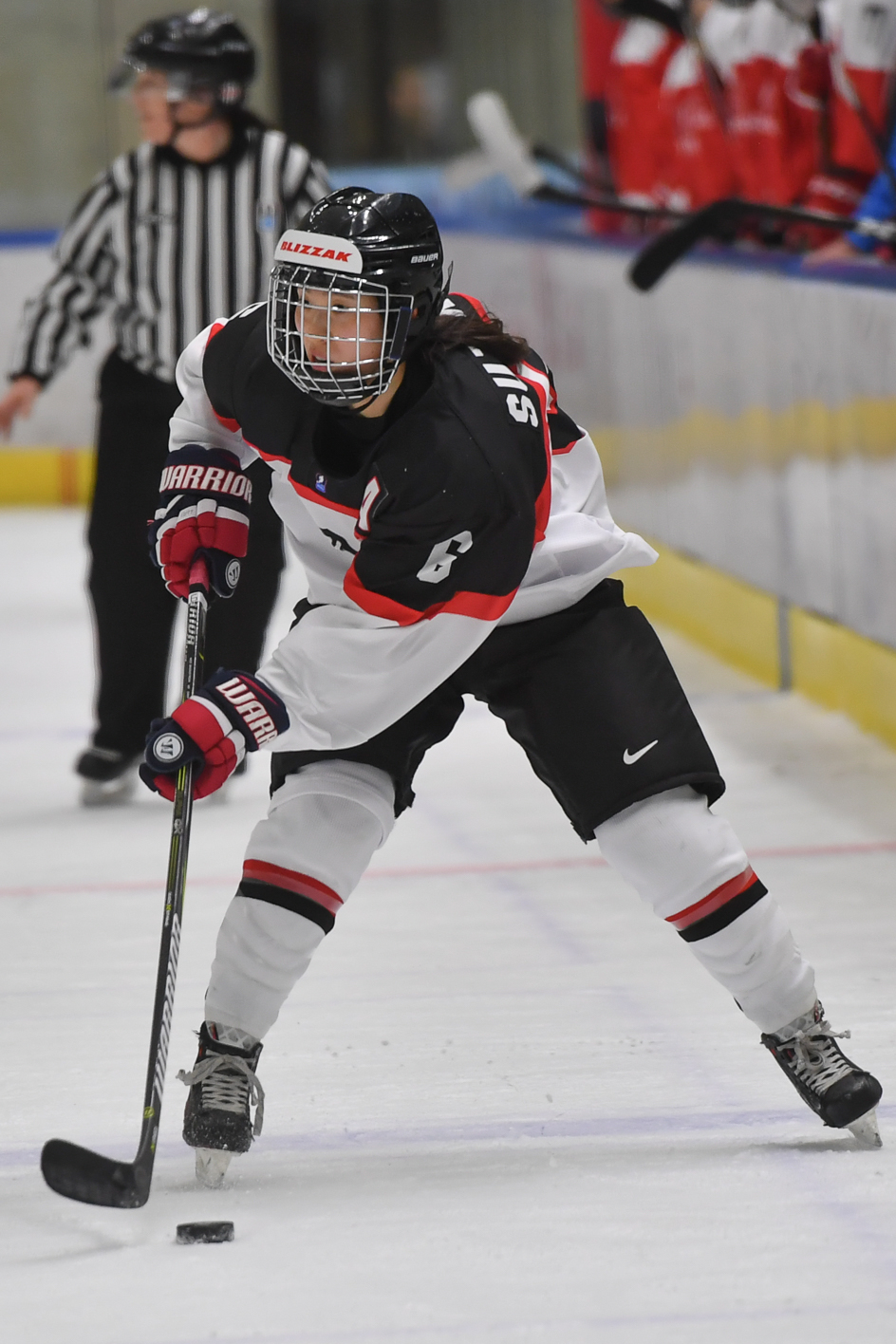
- Suzuki in 2017
- Born: 4 August 1991 (age 35) Hokkaido, Japan
- Height: 1.67 m (5 ft 6 in)
- Weight: 58 kg (128 lb; 9 st 2 lb)
- Position: Defense
- Shoots: Left
- Played for: Seibu Princess Rabbits; Göteborg HC; AIK IF; Toronto Furies
- National team: Japan
- Playing career: 2008–present
Medal record
Universiade
Bronze medal – third place	2015 Granada	Ice hockey
Asian Winter Games
Gold medal – first place	2017 Sapporo	Ice hockey
Silver medal – second place	2011 Astana–Almaty	Ice hockey

Sena Suzuki (鈴木 世奈, すずき せな, Suzuki Sena; born 4 August 1991) is a Japanese ice hockey player and member of the Japanese national team. She has played in the Women's Japan Ice Hockey League (WJIHL) with the Seibu Princess Rabbits, in the Canadian Women's Hockey League (CWHL) with the Toronto Furies, and in the Swedish Women's Hockey League (SDHL) with AIK Hockey and Göteborg HC.

== Playing career ==
=== CWHL ===
In 2015, Suzuki was drafted in the 8th Round of the 2015 CWHL Draft by the Toronto Furies. She scored her 1st goal with the Furies on 6 December 2015, against the Calgary Inferno. The goal ended up being the game-winner for Toronto. The historic goal for Suzuki came two days after she was named to play in the 2nd Canadian Women's Hockey League All-Star Game. Suzuki made history as the first international player (born outside of Canada and the United States) to participate in the CWHL All-Star Game.

=== International ===
Suzuki competed at both the 2014 and the 2018 Winter Olympics. She participated at the 2015 IIHF Women's World Championship.

== Career statistics ==
			Regular season					Playoffs
Season	Team	League	GP	G	A	Pts	PIM	GP	G	A	Pts	PIM
2015-16	Toronto Furies	CWHL	22	1	5	6	8	2	0	0	0	0
2016-17	Toronto Furies	CWHL	6	0	0	0	2	-	-	-	-	-
2017-18	Toronto Furies	CWHL	-	-	-	-	-	-	-	-	-	-
2018-19	Toronto Furies	CWHL	28	0	1	1	6	3	0	0	0	0
2019-20	AIK IF	SDHL	36	0	4	4	18	2	0	0	0	2
CWHL totals			56	1	6	7	16	5	0	0	0	2
SDHL totals			36	0	4	4	18	2	0	0	0	2
