= Jess Jones =

Canadian ice hockey player

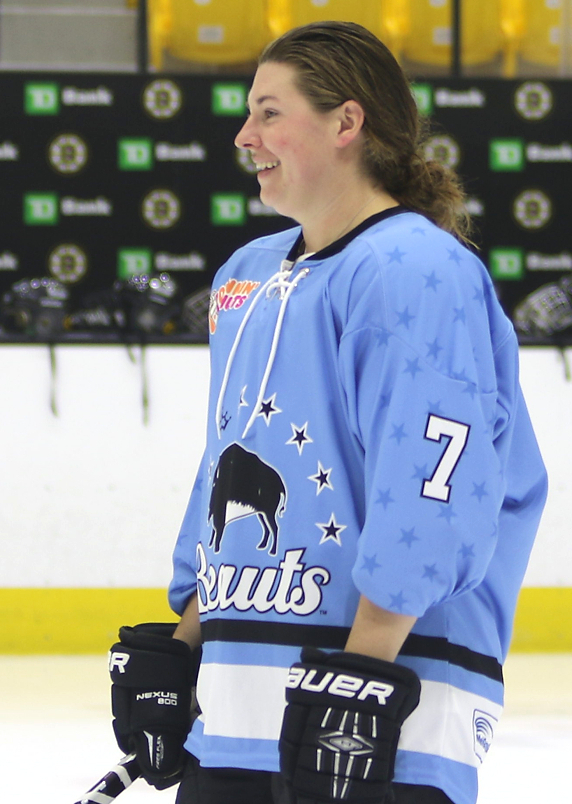
- Jones playing for the Buffalo Beauts in 2017
- Born: August 30, 1990 (age 36) Picton, Ontario, Canada
- Height: 5 ft 4 in (163 cm)
- Weight: 135 lb (61 kg; 9 st 9 lb)
- Position: Forward
- Played for: PWHL Toronto; PWHPA; Markham Thunder; Buffalo Beauts; HK Pantera Minsk; Mercyhurst Lakers
- National team: Canada
- Playing career: 2008–2024
Medal record
World U18 Championship
Silver medal – second place	2008 Canada

Jessica Jones (born August 30, 1990) is a Canadian former professional ice hockey player. Jones was a member of the Canadian national under-18 team that competed at the first IIHF Women's U18 World Championships in 2008 and she played for PWHL Toronto during the inaugural season of the Professional Women's Hockey League.

== Playing career ==
=== Hockey Canada ===
Jones was a member of the Team Ontario Red squad that captured its fourth consecutive gold medal at the 2007 Canadian U18 national women's ice hockey championships. With the national under-18 team, Jones would gain three points in a 17–0 win against Finland on January 9, 2008. Two of her teammates from Team Canada's U18 roster in 2008 would one day be teammates on the Brampton Thunder: Laura McIntosh and Laura Fortino.

=== NCAA ===
Jones played with the Mercyhurst Lakers women's ice hockey program in the College Hockey America (CHA) conference of the NCAA Division I from 2008 to 2012. She appeared in 138 games and amassed 154 points. In her senior season, she logged a career-best 48 points, complemented by six power play goals.

=== Europe ===
After graduating from Mercyhurst, Jones opted to play in the Elite Women's Hockey League (EWHL), signing with the league's lone Belarusian team, HK Pantera Minsk. She was the only Canadian on a roster dominated by Belarusian and Russian players but which also included expatriates Galina Larionova of Kazakhstan, Martina Veličková of Slovakia, Tatyana Chizhova and Nataliya Kozachuk of Ukraine, and Kelly Buchta and Kathryn Walker of the United States. Jones finished the season as the team's leading scorer, logging 28 goals and 25 assists for 53 points in just 19 games played and posting an excellent +43 plus-minus which tied for team best with Pantera's second leading scorer, Lidiya Malyavko. That season, Jones and her teammates would compete in the EWHL Super Cup, where she logged eight points as Pantera won the Super Cup for the first time.

=== CWHL ===
Jones was selected in the first round, third overall by the Brampton Thunder in the 2013 CWHL Draft. She made her CWHL debut with the Thunder on November 2, 2013, against the Boston Blades. The following day, Jones scored her first CWHL goal in a rematch with the Blades against Brittany Ott, assisted by Lindsey Vine and Sarah Moe. Her first multi-point game was logged on February 8, 2014, against the Montreal Stars. Jones logged nine points in 23 games played during her rookie CWHL season in 2013–14.

During the 2014–15 season, Jones scored the first game-winning goal of her CWHL career on November 15, 2014, against the Montreal Stars; a power play goal scored on Stars' goaltender Charline Labonté in the second period, with assists from Jennifer Kirk and Dania Simmonds. In addition, she was among the competitors at the 1st Canadian Women's Hockey League All-Star Game, contested at Toronto's Air Canada Centre. At the conclusion of the 2014–15 campaign, Jones was the leading scorer for the Thunder with 16 points, finishing one point ahead of Laura Fortino for the lead.

At the 3rd CWHL All-Star Game, Jones and Jillian Saulnier both scored a hat-trick, becoming the first competitors in CWHL All-Star Game history to achieve the feat.

Jones tied for first in the league scoring race with 37 points in the 2016–17 CWHL season and co-won the Angela James Bowl with Marie-Philip Poulin. Statistically, her finest single-game performance was a five-point effort in a January 21, 2017, road game against the Boston Blades, which saw the Thunder prevail by an 8–0 margin. Jones scored a goal in each period and logged assists on a first-period goal by Rebecca Vint and on Laura Fortino's fourth goal of the season, scored in the second period.

=== NWHL ===
On August 31, 2017, Jones signed with the Buffalo Beauts as a free agent, joining former Thunder teammates Sarah Edney and Rebecca Vint who also signed with the Beauts.

=== PWHL ===
In 2023, Jones signed a contract with PWHL Toronto following a training camp invitation. In order to sign with the team, she took a leave of absence from her role as a police officer with the Ontario Provincial Police.

On October 8, 2024, Jones announced her retirement from professional hockey after a career that spanned 12 seasons.

== Career statistics ==
=== Regular season and playoffs ===
			Regular season					Playoffs
Season	Team	League	GP	G	A	Pts	PIM	GP	G	A	Pts	PIM
2005–06	Whitby Wolves	PWHL	30	20	11	31	35	3	2	1	3	12
2006–07	Whitby Wolves	PWHL	32	21	8	29	54	6	4	2	6	4
2007–08	Whitby Wolves	PWHL	27	16	12	28	30	4	0	0	0	0
2008–09	Mercyhurst Lakers	NCAA	37	16	18	34	24	—	—	—	—	—
2009–10	Mercyhurst Lakers	NCAA	36	20	26	46	28	—	—	—	—	—
2010–11	Mercyhurst Lakers	NCAA	29	12	14	26	20	—	—	—	—	—
2011–12	Mercyhurst Lakers	NCAA	34	13	35	48	22	—	—	—	—	—
2012–13	HK Pantera Minsk	EWHL	19	28	25	53	18	—	—	—	—	—
2013–14	Brampton Thunder	CWHL	23	5	4	9	26	—	—	—	—	—
2014–15	Brampton Thunder	CWHL	24	7	9	16	12	—	—	—	—	—
2015–16	Brampton Thunder	CWHL	24	14	10	24	36	2	0	0	0	0
2016–17	Brampton Thunder	CWHL	24	17	20	37	28	—	—	—	—	—
2017–18	Buffalo Beauts	NWHL	14	4	5	9	11	2	0	0	0	0
2018–19	Markham Thunder	CWHL	25	9	6	15	20	2	0	0	0	0
2021–22	Toronto	PWHPA	7	1	1	2	4	—	—	—	—	—
2022–23	Team Adidas	PWHPA	8	0	1	1	0	—	—	—	—	—
NCAA totals			136	61	93	154	94	—	—	—	—	—
CWHL totals			120	52	49	101	122	4	0	0	0	0
PWHPA totals			8	0	1	1	0	—	—	—	—	—

=== International ===
Year	Team	Event	Result	GP	G	A	Pts	PIM
2008	U18	U18	2nd place, silver medalist(s)	5	2	4	6	4
Junior totals				5	2	4	6	4

== Awards and honours ==
- 2009 College Hockey America All-Rookie Team
- 2009 College Hockey America All-Tournament Team
- College Hockey America Player of the Week (Week of March 1, 2010)
- CWHL All-Star Game (2014, 2016, 2017)
- Finalist, 2017 CWHL Most Valuable Player
- 2017 Angela James Bowl (co-winner with Marie-Philip Poulin)
