= National Sports Academy =

National Sports Academy can refer to:

- National Sports Academy "Vasil Levski"
- National Sports Academy (Lake Placid, New York)
