= 3rd Canadian Women's Hockey League All-Star Game =

3rd CWHL All-Star Game
	1	2	3	Total
Team Blue	0	2	3	5
Team White	3	1	5	9
- Date: February 12, 2017
- Arena: Air Canada Centre
- City: Toronto, Ontario, Canada
- MVP: To Be Determined

The 3rd Canadian Women's Hockey League All-Star Game took place on February 12, 2017, at Air Canada Centre in Toronto, Ontario, Canada. The event featured three 20-minute periods, and 34 players were named as participants Jess Jones and Jillian Saulnier both scored a hat trick, becoming the first competitors in CWHL All-Star Game history to achieve the feat.

== News and notes ==
=== Fan balloting ===
Voting for CWHL all-star captains started in January 2017. Online voting required fans to vote on the CWHL.com web site. Fans are presented with a list of 34 players. Carlee Campbell of the Toronto Furies led all players in the online voting, capturing 2088 votes. She would be named captain of Team White. Natalie Spooner and Meaghan Mikkelson both captured 11.71% of possible online votes, both sharing in the captaincy for Team Blue. Of note, this marked the first time that one team in the CWHL All-Star Game had two captains.

=== Alumni coaches ===
In celebration of the CWHL's tenth anniversary season, a group of four former players were named as Alumni Coaches for the All-Star Game. Among them were Lisa-Marie Breton, Tessa Bonhomme, Becky Kellar and Cheryl Pounder. Each of these alumni coaches were eligible for selection in the Frozen Fantasy Draft.

== Rosters ==
=== Fantasy draft ===
The draft of the players took place on February 10, 2017 at 8:00 pm, Eastern time. It was held at the Hilton Hotel in Toronto.

With the first pick overall, Team White's Carlee Campbell selected Marie-Philip Poulin. It marked the second year in a row that Poulin was taken first overall in the Frozen Fantasy Draft. As Team Blue had two captains, Meaghan Mikkelson and Natalie Spooner, they were only allocated four draft picks, while Team White was allowed five picks. The remaining rosters were determined with a random stick draw.

As alumni coaches were also subject to the Frozen Fantasy Draft process, Team White once again had the prestige of the first pick overall, selecting Tessa Bonhomme. Team Blue would acquire Cheryl Pounder with the second pick overall. With their final selection, Team White picked Becky Kellar as their second alumni coach, while Lisa-Marie Breton-Lebreux would end up with Team Blue.

Team White
Pick	Nat.	Player	Team	Pos.
1	(Canada)	Marie-Philip Poulin	Canadiennes de Montreal	Forward
3	(Canada)	Rebecca Johnston	Calgary Inferno	Forward
5	(Canada)	Laura Fortino	Brampton Thunder	Defense
7	(Canada)	Caroline Ouellette	Canadiennes de Montreal	Forward
9	(Canada)	Christina Kessler	Toronto Furies	Goaltender

Team Red
Pick	Nat.	Player	Team	Pos.
2	(Canada)	Ann-Sophie Bettez	Canadiennes de Montreal	Forward
4	(Canada)	Courtney Birchard	Brampton Thunder	Defense
6	(Canada)	Brianne Jenner	Calgary Inferno	Forward
8	(Canada)	Emerance Maschmeyer	Calgary Inferno	Goaltender

=== Players named ===
Player	Nationality	Position	Team
Erica Howe	Canada	Goaltender	Brampton Thunder
Emerance Maschmeyer	Canada	Goaltender	Calgary Inferno
Charline Labonte	Canada	Goaltender	Canadiennes de Montreal
Christina Kessler	Canada	Goaltender	Toronto Furies
Tara Watchorn	Canada	Defense	Boston Blades
Jocelyne Larocque	Canada	Defense	Brampton Thunder
Courtney Birchard	Canada	Defense	Brampton Thunder
Laura Fortino	Canada	Defense	Brampton Thunder
Meaghan Mikkelson	Canada	Defense	Calgary Inferno
Katelyn Gosling	Canada	Defense	Calgary Inferno
Lauriane Rougeau	Canada	Defense	Canadiennes de Montreal
Cassandra Poudrier	Canada	Defense	Canadiennes de Montreal
Julie Chu	United States	Defense	Canadiennes de Montreal
Erin Ambrose	Canada	Defense	Toronto Furies
Carlee Campbell	Canada	Defense	Toronto Furies
Renata Fast	Canada	Defense	Toronto Furies
Kayla Tutino	Canada	Forward	Boston Blades
Meghan Grieves	United States	Forward	Boston Blades
Jess Jones	Canada	Forward	Brampton Thunder
Laura Stacey	Canada	Forward	Brampton Thunder
Rebecca Vint	Canada	Forward	Brampton Thunder
Jamie Lee Rattray	Canada	Forward	Brampton Thunder
Brianne Jenner	Canada	Forward	Calgary Inferno
Jillian Saulnier	Canada	Forward	Calgary Inferno
Haley Irwin	Canada	Forward	Calgary Inferno
Rebecca Johnston	Canada	Forward	Calgary Inferno
Marie-Philip Poulin	Canada	Forward	Canadiennes de Montreal
Caroline Ouellette	Canada	Forward	Canadiennes de Montreal
Ann-Sophie Bettez	Canada	Forward	Canadiennes de Montreal
Sarah Lefort	Canada	Forward	Canadiennes de Montreal
Natalie Spooner	Canada	Forward	Toronto Furies
Jenelle Kohanchuk	Canada	Forward	Toronto Furies
Kelly Terry	Canada	Forward	Toronto Furies
Michela Cava	Canada	Forward	Toronto Furies

== Game summary ==
Team White skaters Jess Jones and Jillian Saulnier became the first competitors to score a hat trick in CWHL All-Star Game history. Team Blue outshot Team White by a 39-36 margin. Team Blue starting goaltender Emerance Maschmeyer stopped 14 of 17 shots, while Howe was 13 of 18. Team White starting goaltender Christina Kessler recorded shutout play, facing 18 shots, while Labonte stopped 16 of 20 shots.

Scoring summary
Team	Goal	Assist(s)	Time	Score
1st period: Emerance Maschmeyer (Team Blue) vs. Christina Kessler (Team White)
Team White	Jess Jones (1)	Carlee Campbell (1), Rebecca Johnston (1)	07:36	1-0, Team White
Team White	Jess Jones (2)	Jillian Saulnier (1), Rebecca Johnston (2)	12:03	2-0, Team White
Team White	Jillian Saulnier (1)	Marie-Philip Poulin (1)	14:05	3-0, Team White
2nd period: Emerance Maschmeyer and Erica Howe (Team Blue) vs. Christina Kessler and Charline Labonte (Team White)
Team Blue	Kelly Terry (1)	Jamie Lee Rattray (1)	15:42	3-1, Team White
Team White	Jillian Saulnier (2)	Marie-Philip Poulin (2)	18:41	4-1, Team White
Team Blue	Brianne Jenner (1)	Natalie Spooner (1), Jamie-Lee Rattray (2)	19:20	4-2, Team White
3rd period: Erica Howe (Team Blue) vs. Charline Labonte (Team White)
Team Blue	Jenelle Kohanchuk (1) Power Play	Haley Irwin (1)	01:31	4-3, Team White
Team White	Rebecca Johnston (1)	Carlee Campbell (2)	03:08	5-3, Team White
Team White	Marie-Philip Poulin (1)	Laura Stacey (1), Rebecca Vint (1)	06:32	6-3, Team White
Team Blue	Haley Irwin (1)	Jenelle Kohanchuk (1)	06:42	6-4, Team White
Team White	Jess Jones (3)	Rebecca Johnston (3)	06:32	7-4, Team White
Team Blue	Jenelle Kohanchuk (2)	Ann-Sophie Bettez (1)	10:28	7-5, Team White
Team White	Meghan Grieves (1)	Marie-Philip Poulin (3), Laura Fortino (1)	17:20	8-5, Team White
Team White	Jillian Saulnier (3) Empty Net	Unassisted	18:52	9-5, Team White
