= 2013 CWHL Draft =

General information
- Date(s): August, 2013

Overview
- First selection: Jessica Wong

The 2013 CWHL Draft was held in August 2013. Jessica Wong became the first visible minority selected with the first pick overall. Wong was also part of another unique piece of draft history. Her teammate from the Minnesota-Duluth Bulldogs, Katie Wilson, was picked second overall. It marked the first time that two NCAA teammates were selected first and second overall.

In addition, Blake Bolden became the first ever African American picked in the first round of said draft. Georgia Moore, a member of the Australian national women's team became the first Australian born player selected in the draft. Along with Julie Paetsch, both had experience competing in women's tackle football in the Western Women's Canadian Football League. Moore spent one season with the Okotoks Lady Outlaws, while Paetsch enjoyed multiple seasons with the Saskatoon Valkyries. It marked the first time that two WWCFL players were selected in the CWHL Draft. Of note, Delayne Brian was the first goaltender selected in the draft.

== Top 25 picks ==
#	Player	Position	Team	College
1	Jessica Wong	Forward	Calgary Inferno	Minnesota-Duluth
2	Katie Wilson	Forward	Toronto Furies	Minnesota-Duluth
3	Jess Jones	Forward	Brampton Thunder	Mercyhurst
4	Lauriane Rougeau	Defense	Montreal Stars	Cornell
5	Blake Bolden	Defense	Boston Blades	Boston College
6	Delayne Brian	Goaltender	Calgary	Wayne State; Robert Morris
7	Holly Carrie-Mattimoe	Forward	Toronto	Syracuse
8	Danielle Skirrow	Forward	Brampton	Clarkson
9	Catherine Herron	Goaltender	Montreal	Montreal Carabins
10	Jillian Dempsey	Forward	Boston	Harvard
11	Peggy Wakeham	Defense	Calgary	Vermont
12	Sasha Nanji	Defense	Toronto	Dartmouth
13	Danielle Boudreau	Defense	Brampton	Clarkson
14	Camille Dumais	Forward	Montreal	Dartmouth
15	Casey Pickett	Forward	Boston	Northeastern
16	Danielle Stone	Forward	Calgary	Saskatchewan
17	Jessica Vella	Forward	Toronto	Providence
18	Becky Conroy	Forward	Brampton	Queen's Golden Gaels
19	Casandra Dupuis	Forward	Montreal	Montreal Carabins
20	Jill Cardella		Boston	Boston University
21	Reagan Fischer	Forward	Calgary	Dartmouth
22	Alyssa Baldin	Forward	Toronto	Windsor Lancers
23	Kelly Hart		Brampton	
24	Emilie Bocchia	Forward	Montreal	Concordia
25	Brittany Ott	Goaltender	Boston	Maine

== Draft picks by team ==
= Indicates IIHF Div. 1 Competitor

= Indicates former NCAA player

= Indicates former CIS player

=== Calgary ===
Round	#	Player	Nationality	College
1	1	Jessica Wong	Canada	Minnesota-Duluth
2	6	Delayne Brian	Canada	Robert Morris
3	11	Peggy Wakeham	Canada	Vermont
4	16	Danielle Stone	Canada	Saskatchewan
5	21	Reagan Fischer	Canada	Dartmouth
6	26	Jessica O'Grady	Canada	Carleton
7	31	Taryn Peacock	Canada	
8	36	Tegan Schroeder	Canada	
9	41	Jacquie Pierri	United States	Brown
10	46	Julie Paetsch	Canada	Saskatchewan
11	51	Alannah Jensen	Canada	Mount Royal
12	56	Rhianna Kurio	Canada	Union
13	61	Georgia Moore	Australia	Strathmore (WWHL)
14	63	Carling Wright	Canada	

=== Boston ===
Round	#	Player	Nationality	College
1	5	Blake Bolden	United States	Boston College
2	10	Jillian Dempsey	United States	Harvard
3	15	Casey Pickett	United States	Northeastern
4	20	Jill Cardella	United States	Boston University
5	25	Brittany Ott	United States	Maine
6	30	Rachel Llanes	United States	Northeastern
7	35	Kelly Cooke	United States	
8	40	Kiira Dosdall	United States	Colgate
9	45	Alissa Fromkin	United States	Boston University
10	50	Maggie Taverna	United States	
11	55	Dru Burns	United States	Boston College
12	60	Ashley Cottrell	United States	
13	62	Christie Jensen	United States	
14	64	Shannon Mahoney	United States	Boston University
15	65	Emma Rambo	United States	
16	66	Becca Koppel	United States	
17	67	Ding Xiaolin	China	Chinese national women's team
18	68	Zoe Zisis	United States	

=== Brampton ===
Round	#	Player	Nationality	College
1	3	Jess Jones	Canada	Mercyhurst Lakers
2	8	Danielle Skirrow	Canada	Clarkson
3	13	Danielle Boudreau	Canada	Clarkson
4	18	Becky Conroy	Canada	
5	23	Kelly Hart	Canada	
8	28	Ashley Pendleton	Canada	Mercyhurst
9	43	Sonja van der Bliek	Canada	RPI
10	48	Sarah Stephens	Canada	Barrie (PWHL)
11	53	Jamie Miller	Canada	Quinnipiac

=== Montreal ===
Round	#	Player	Nationality	College
1	4	Lauriane Rougeau	Canada	Cornell
2	9	Catherine Herron	Canada	Montreal Carabins
3	14	Camille Dumais	Canada	Dartmouth
4	19	Casandra Dupuis	Canada	Montreal Carabins
5	24	Emilie Bocchia	Canada	Concordia
6	29	Meghan Corley-Byrne	Canada	Mount Allison
7	34	Fannie Desforges	Canada	Ottawa
8	39	Nathalie Dery	Canada	
9	44	Laurie Proulx-Duperré	Canada	Concordia
10	49	Melanie Fournier	Canada	Dawson College (CEGEP)
11	54	Jessica Caputo	Canada	

=== Toronto ===
Round	#	Player	Nationality	College
1	2	Katie Wilson	Canada	Minnesota-Duluth
2	7	Holly Carrie-Mattimoe	Canada	Syracuse
3	12	Sasha Nanji	Canada	Dartmouth
4	17	Jessica Vella	Canada	Providence
5	22	Alyssa Baldin	Canada	Windsor
9	42	Maggie Giamo	United States	SUNY Cortland
10	47	Lauren Sullivan	Canada	Elmira
11	52	Kristy Garrow	Canada	St. Francis Xavier
