= 2014 CWHL Draft =

General information
- Date(s): August 19, 2014

Overview
- First selection: Laura Fortino

The 2014 CWHL Draft was held on August 19, 2014. With the first pick overall, the Brampton Thunder selected Laura Fortino from the Canadian National Women's Team. The defending Clarkson Cup champion Toronto Furies had the second pick overall, and selected Megan Bozek. 2014 Patty Kazmaier Award winner Jamie Lee Rattray was selected in the second round by Brampton. Erica Howe, who played with Rattray with the Clarkson Golden Knights was the first goaltender selected in the draft, 16th overall to Brampton.

== Top 25 picks ==
#	Player	Position	Team	College
1	Laura Fortino	Defense	Brampton Thunder	Canadian national team
2	Megan Bozek	Defense	Toronto Furies	United States national team
3	Sarah Davis	Forward	Calgary Inferno	Minnesota
4	Jenny Potter	Forward	Boston Blades	United States national team
5	Kim Deschenes	Forward	Montreal Stars	Montreal Carabins
6	Jamie Lee Rattray	Forward	Brampton	Clarkson
7	Kelly Terry	Forward	Toronto	Minnesota
8	Hayleigh Cudmore	Defense	Calgary	Cornell
9	Monique Lamoureux	Defense	Boston	United States national team
10	Vanessa Gagnon	Forward	Montreal	Clarkson
11	Carly Mercer	Forward	Brampton	Clarkson
12	Tanis Lamoureux	Forward	Toronto	Elmira College
13	Louise Warren	Forward	Calgary	Boston University
14	Brianna Decker	Forward	Boston	United States national team
15	Sophie Brault	Defense	Montreal	Montreal Carabins
16	Erica Howe	Goaltender	Brampton	Clarkson
17	Candice Styles	Defense	Toronto	Wilfrid Laurier
18	Jessica Campbell	Forward	Calgary	Cornell
19	Alyssa Gagliardi	Defense	Boston	Cornell
20	Chelsey Saunders	Forward	Montreal	McGill
21	Kelly O'Hanlon	Forward	Brampton	Toronto Varsity Blues
22	Laurel Hill	Defense	Toronto	St. Norbert College
23	Brittany Esposito	Forward	Calgary	Northeastern
24	Kaleigh Fratkin	Defense	Boston	Boston University
25	Erin Lally	Forward	Montreal	Concordia

== Draft picks by team ==
= Indicates Olympic competitor

= Indicates former NCAA player

= Indicates former CIS player

=== Boston ===
Round	#	Player	Nationality	College
1	4	Jenny Potter	United States	Minnesota-Duluth
2	8	Monique Lamoureux	United States	North Dakota
3	12	Brianna Decker	United States	Wisconsin
4	16	Alyssa Gagliardi	United States	Cornell
5	20	Kaleigh Fratkin	United States	Boston University
6	24	Bray Ketchum	United States	Yale
7	34	Nicole Stock	United States	Brown
8	38	Denna Laing	United States	Princeton
9	41	Janine Weber	United States	Providence
10	43	Jordan Smelker	United States	RPI
11	45	Rebecca Morse	United States	Providence
12	47	Megan Myers	United States	Utica College
13	49	Laura Veharanta	United States	Providence
14	51	Taylor Holza	United States	Boston University
15	53	Brooke Fernandez	United States	St. Lawrence
16	55	Corinne Buie	United States	Providence
17	56	Denise Cardello	United States	Castleton State
18	57	Alexius Schutt	United States	Sacred Heart
19	58	Stephanie Ciampa	United States	Mercyhurst

=== Brampton ===
Round	#	Player	Nationality	College
1	1	Laura Fortino	Canada	Cornell
2	6	Jamie Lee Rattray	Canada	Clarkson
3	11	Carly Mercer	Canada	Clarkson
4	16	Erica Howe	Canada	Clarkson
5	21	Kelly O'Hanlon	Canada	University of Toronto
6	26	Ellie Seedhouse	Canada	Western Ontario
7	31	Jennifer Ward	Canada	
8	35	Fielding Montgomery	Canada	Dalhousie University
9	39	Michelle Ashburner	Canada	Western Ontario

=== Calgary ===
Round	#	Player	Nationality	College
1	3	Sarah Davis	Canada	Minnesota
2	8	Hayleigh Cudmore	Canada	Cornell
3	13	Louise Warren	Canada	Boston University
4	18	Jessica Campbell	Canada	Cornell
5	23	Brittany Esposito	Canada	Northeastern
6	28	Kristen Hagg	Canada	SAWHA Calgary Chargers
7	33	Samantha Fieseler	Canada	Pursuit Of Excellence Hockey Academy
8	37	Aina Takeuchi	Japan	Japanese National Team
9	40	Camille Trautman	Canada	Red Deer College
10	42	Calaine Inglis	Canada	Calgary Dinos
11	44	Glenda Eadie	Canada	Lethbridge
12	46	Christina Kelly	Canada	University of PEI
13	48	Olivia Ross	Canada	Western Ontario
14	50	Rebecca Mosher	Canada	St. Mary's
15	52	Cassidy Anderson	Canada	Northern Alberta Institute Technology
16	54	Dayna King	Canada	Sask Wheat Queens

=== Montreal ===
Round	#	Player	Nationality	College
1	5	Kim Deschenes	Canada	Montreal
2	10	Vanessa Gagnon	Canada	Clarkson
3	15	Sophie Brault	Canada	Montreal
4	20	Chelsey Saunders	Canada	Montreal
5	25	Erin Lally	Canada	Montreal
6	30	Sydney Aveson	United States	Plattsburgh State

=== Toronto ===
Round	#	Player	Nationality	College
1	2	Megan Bozek	United States	Minnesota
2	7	Kelly Terry	Canada	Minnesota
3	12	Tanis Lamoureux	United States	Elmira College
4	17	Candice Styles	Canada	Wilfrid Laurier
5	22	Laurel Hill	Canada	St. Norbert College
6	27	Leah Whittaker	Canada	Niagara
7	32	Danielle Butters	Canada	MSU-Mankato
8	36	Laura Saar		
