= Carlee Campbell =

Canadian ice hockey player

- Born: October 23, 1988 (age 37) Oakville, Ontario, Canada
- Height: 5 ft 10 in (178 cm)
- Weight: 164 lb (74 kg; 11 st 10 lb)
- Position: Defence
- Shoots: Right
- CWHL team Former teams: Toronto Furies; Clarkson Golden Knights (NCAA)
- Playing career: 2006–present

Carlee Eusepi-Campbell (born October 23, 1988) is a Canadian-born women's ice hockey player. Currently a member of the Toronto Furies, Campbell was the captain for Team White in the 3rd CWHL All-Star Game.

== Playing career ==
A member of Team Ontario Red for the 2005 Canadian National Under-18 Women's Hockey Championships (contested in January), some of her teammates included Meghan Agosta, Haley Irwin, Christina Kessler and Jessica Wakefield.

=== NCAA ===
On September 29, 2006, Campbell logged the first goal of her collegiate career, achieving the feat against the Vermont Catamounts. An October 27, 2006 match against the Quinnipiac Bobcats resulted in her first collegiate assist. In her sophomore season, Campbell led the Golden Knights with a +30 plus-minus rating. In addition, she paced all blueliners with 20 points, on the strength of 14 assists. As a senior, she logged four power play goals, complemented by three game-winning goals. In addition, the Golden Knights made their first ever appearance in the NCAA tournament.

During the 2009–10 NCAA Division I women's ice hockey season, Campbell (known by her maiden name Eusepi) played for the ECAC women's All-Star Team that played against the US national team which went on to compete at the 2010 Vancouver Winter Games.

=== CWHL ===
Selected in the 11th round by the Toronto Furies in the 2016 CWHL Draft, she made her debut with the club on October 15 against the Boston Blades. The following day, she would log the first assist of her CWHL career, assisting on a third period goal by Kelly Terry. Logging the first goal of her CWHL career in an October 30 road game, she would also log an assist in the game, recording her first multi-point game. Scoring her goal against Liz Knox at the 9:33 mark of the third period, Kelly Terry gained the assist. For her efforts, Campbell was recognized as the Third Star of the Game.

== Career stats ==
=== NCAA ===
Year	GP	G	A	PTS	PIM	PPG	SHG	GWG
2006-07	36	4	17	21	N/A	2	0	0
2007-08	35	6	14	20	4	3	0	0
2008-09	36	2	11	13	10	2	0	0
2009-10	39	6	13	19	12	4	0	3

=== CWHL ===
(Stats as of February 6, 2017)

Season	Team	GP	G	A	PTS	PIM	PPG	SHG	GWG
2016-17	Toronto Furies	24	1	8	9	6	0	0	0

== Awards and honours ==
- 2006-07 ECAC All-Rookie Team
- 2007-08 ECAC Hockey Third Team All-Star
- 2008-09 ECAC Hockey Third Team All-Star
- 2008-09 ECAC Hockey All-Academic
- 2009-10 ECAC Hockey Second Team All-Star
- 2009-2010 All-Star ECAC Hockey vs Team USA
- 2009-10, ECAC Hockey Best-Defensive-Defenseman Award
- Captain, Team White, 3rd CWHL All-Star Game
