= Nicole Giannino =

American ice hockey player

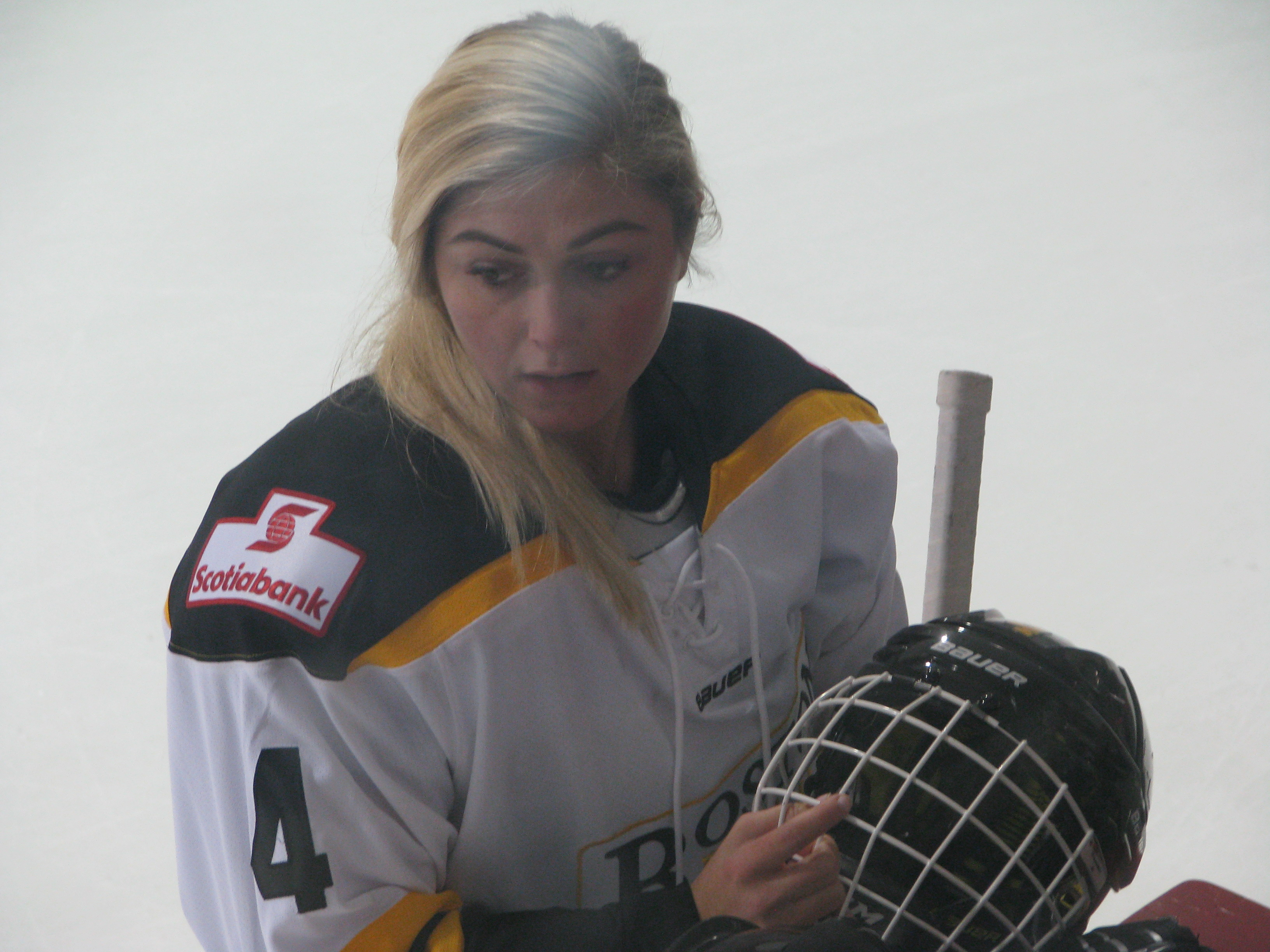
- Giannino in 2016
- Born: September 19, 1993 (age 33) Long Island, New York, U.S.
- Height: 5 ft 2 in (157 cm)
- Shot: Right
- Played for: Boston Blades
- Playing career: 2015–2020
Medal record
IIHF Inline Hockey World Championship
Gold medal – first place	2011 World Championships	Italy
Silver medal – second place	2012 World Championships	Colombia
Gold medal – first place	2013 World Championships	USA
Silver medal – second place	2015 World Championships	Argentina
Silver medal – second place	2016 World Championships	Italy
Gold medal – first place	2017 World Championships	China
Gold medal – first place	2018 World Championships	Italy
Gold medal – first place	2019 World Championships	Spain

Nicole Paolina Giannino (born September 19, 1993) is an American professional ice hockey player and actress.

Giannino was a second-round (10th overall) draft pick in the 2015 Professional Canadian Women's Hockey League (CWHL) Draft, playing for the Boston Blades. She was featured in The New York Times as amongst the first professional women's hockey players to receive a salary.

== Early life ==
Giannino grew up in Long Island, New York, as a childhood actress before beginning playing hockey at the age eleven. She played for teams such as the Long Island Waves, Suffolk PAL, 'Suffolk County Selects, and the Long Island Lady Islanders.

Giannino attended West Islip High School and later transferred to the National Sports Academy (NSA) in Lake Placid, New York, an Olympic training center school where she was scouted by Bill Ward.

== Career ==
=== Hockey ===
Giannino played NCAA Division I collegiate hockey for the College of the Holy Cross in the Eastern College Athletic Conference (ECAC) on a full athletic scholarship. Over her four years, she played in 104 games, and was among the top three point leaders in all four years, leading the team in points during her junior and senior year.

Giannino organized annual Breast Cancer Awareness and Multiple Sclerosis Awareness games at Holy Cross and the Boston Blades.

In 2015, Giannino became the first Holy Cross player to be drafted into professional women’s sports, selected in the second round, 10th overall of the CWHL Draft by the Boston Blades. She competed alongside notable Olympians in the league such as Marie-Philip Poulin and Meghan Duggan.

Giannino was an advocate for professional women's hockey to receive a liveable salary, and was amongst the first women to get paid to be a professional athlete.

At just 15 years old, Giannino became the youngest player ever selected to the Team USA Women’s Inline Hockey Team. She competed in multiple World Championships with notable accolades earned including 2018 World Championships, Italy (Gold Medal), 2019 World Championships, Spain (Gold Medal) and others.

=== Acting ===
Giannino has appeared in films such as A Packing Suburbia (1999), Wannabes (2000), Marie (2001), The Signs of the Cross (2005), Jesse (2011), and Send No Flowers (2013).

== Awards and honors ==
- Won 6 World Championship medals (3 Gold, 2 Silver, 1 Bronze) for her Team USA Women’s Inline Hockey Team.
- Won Second-round (10th overall) draft pick in the 2015 Professional Canadian Women's Hockey League (CWHL) Draft, playing for the Boston Blades
- Named ECAC East Player of the Week three times.
- Named Holy Cross Most Valuable Player (2013–2014, 2014–2015)
- Named Holy Cross Player of the Year (2013–2014)

== See also ==
- 2015 CWHL Draft
- National Sports Academy (Lake Placid, New York)
