= Meghan Grieves =

American ice hockey player (born 1994)

- Born: May 3, 1994 (age 31) Cary, NC, United States
- Position: Forward (ice hockey)
- Shoots: Right
- Played for: Boston College, Boston Blades, Worcester Blades, PWHPA
- Playing career: 2006–present

Meghan Grieves (born May 3, 1994) is an American professional ice hockey player with the PWHPA, and formerly with the Boston Blades in the CWHL. She played Division 1 Hockey for Boston College, graduating in 2016.

== Personal life ==
Grieves is originally from Cary, North Carolina. She attended Culver Academies for high school, where she graduated Cum Laude and played on the Varsity Softball, and Varsity Ice Hockey teams. During college, Grieves played in the NCAA for Boston College on the women's ice hockey team. She Graduated in 2016 with a major in Psychology in the College of Arts and Sciences, and a minor in Management and Leadership in the Carroll School of Management.

== CWHL ==
Grieves was drafted 16th overall in the 2016 CWHL Draft by the Boston Blades. Grieves was selected as one of two US-born players for the 2017 CWHL Allstar Game where she scored a goal in the third period. In her first season on the Blades, Grieves led the team in assists, and was second in points both her first and second seasons behind Kate Leary. Her final season in the CWHL she led the team in points.
