= 2015–16 CWHL season =

Ninth season of Canada's women's hockey league

- League: Canadian Women's Hockey League
- Sport: Ice hockey
- Duration: October 17, 2015 – February 21, 2016
- Number of games: 24
- Number of teams: 5

Regular season
- Season champions: Les Canadiennes
- Season MVP: Marie-Philip Poulin
- Top scorer: Marie-Philip Poulin

Clarkson Cup
- Champions: Calgary Inferno
- Runners-up: Les Canadiennes

Seasons
- ← 2014–15 2016–17 →

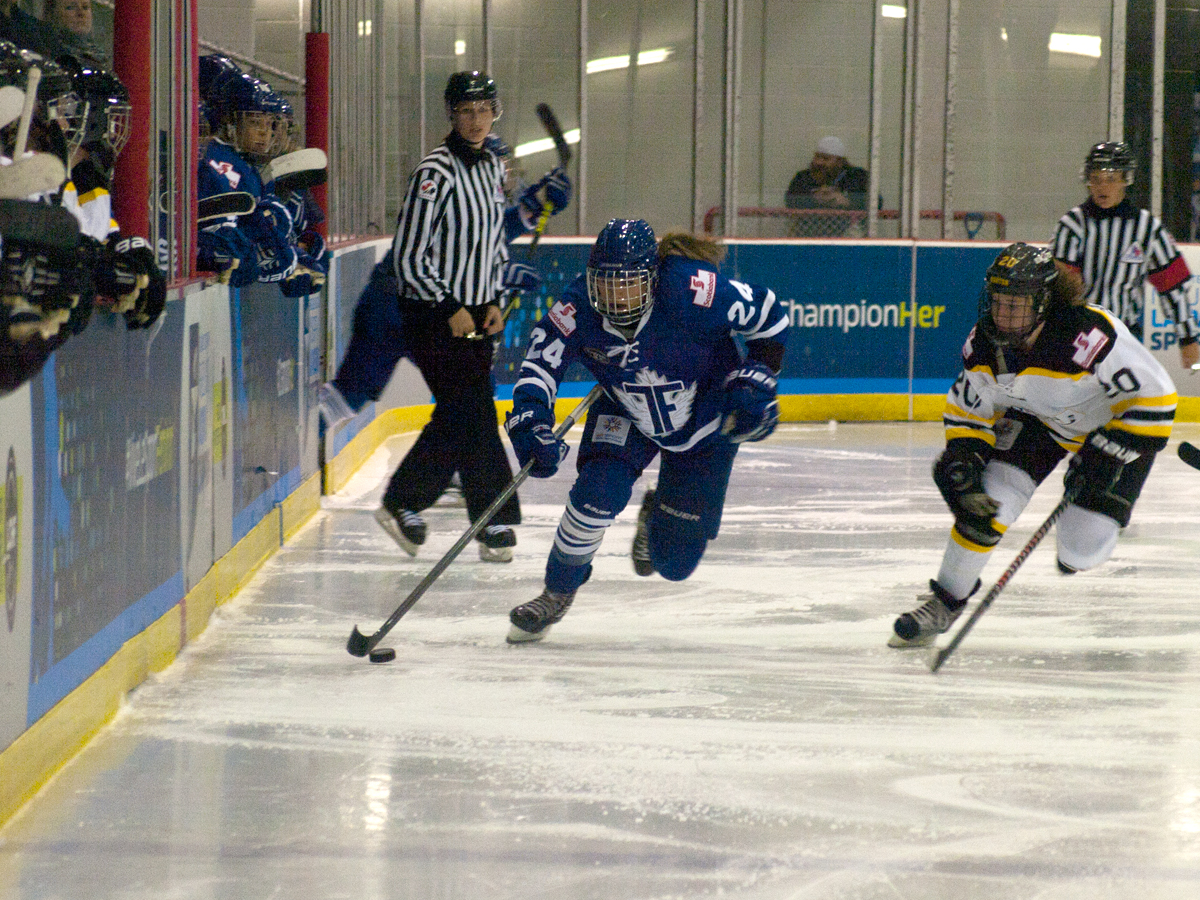
Boston Blades vow Toronto Furies, October 17, 2015

The 2015–16 CWHL season is the ninth season of the Canadian Women's Hockey League (CWHL).

== Offseason ==
=== CWHL Draft ===
For the second consecutive year, the Brampton Thunder held the first pick overall and selected Harvard defender Sarah Edney. Two members of Canada's gold medal winning roster at the 2014 Winter Olympics were selected during the first round: Marie-Philip Poulin by Les Canadiennes and Brianne Jenner by the Calgary Inferno. Calgary also selected Hayley Wickenheiser ninth overall. In total, the five teams selected 55 players over 13 rounds.

== Regular season ==
Les Canadiennes won the Commissioner's Trophy for the best regular season records for the fifth time in seven years, eight points ahead of second-place Calgary Inferno. Montreal also lead the league with a +78 goal differential and an average of 4.75 goals per game. With a 5–4 win against the Brampton Thunder in the final game of the season, Calgary was the second team to secure home-ice advantage for the play-offs. Defending Clarkson Cup champions Boston Blades, however, would only record one shootout victory in their second game of the season, finishing last in the league with two points.

Regular season scoring was led by four Canadiennes players, with Marie-Philip Poulin claiming the Angela James Bowl as the CWHL's top scorer. Along with Natalie Spooner of the Toronto Furies and Laura Fortino of the Brampton Thunder, she was also nominated for the MVP title.

=== Milestones ===
In a game against the Brampton Thunder on December 13, 2015, Noemie Marin registered the 200th point of her CWHL career . She would record two assists in the game, including one on the game-winning tally, to reach the milestone.

=== Standings ===
y– indicates team has clinched regular season title
x– indicates team has clinched a playoff spot

Team	GP	W	OTW	SOW	OTL	SOL	L	Pts	Pts%	GF	GA
y– Les Canadiennes	24	20	0	1	0	0	3	42	.875	114	36
x– Calgary Inferno	24	16	0	0	1	1	6	34	.708	97	67
x– Brampton Thunder	24	13	2	1	0	1	7	33	.688	91	67
x– Toronto Furies	24	6	0	0	1	1	16	14	.292	59	87
Boston Blades	24	0	0	1	0	0	23	2	.042	18	122

=== All-Star Game ===
The CWHL All-Star Game was held at Toronto's Air Canada Centre for the second time. In an online poll, Natalie Spooner and Julie Chu voted as team captains by the fans. Chu's Team Black won the game 5–1, with Marie-Philip Poulin scoring two goals and being named the All-Star Game MVP.

== Statistical leaders ==
=== Leading skaters ===
The following players are sorted by points, then goals.

GP = Games played; G = Goals; A = Assists; Pts = Points; +/– = P Plus–minus; PIM = Penalty minutes

Player	Team	GP	G	A	Pts	PIM
Marie-Philip Poulin	Les Canadiennes	22	23	23	46	10
Ann-Sophie Bettez	Les Canadiennes	24	19	25	44	12
Kim Deschenes	Les Canadiennes	24	13	20	33	6
Caroline Ouellette	Les Canadiennes	24	15	17	32	18
Natalie Spooner	Toronto Furies	22	17	13	30	20
Jamie Lee Rattray	Brampton Thunder	22	13	16	29	18
Brianne Jenner	Calgary Inferno	24	10	18	28	6
Laura Fortino	Brampton Thunder	24	8	20	28	10
Rebecca Vint	Brampton Thunder	24	19	7	26	42
Elana Lovell	Calgary Inferno	24	14	12	26	8

=== Leading goaltenders ===
The following goaltenders with a minimum 500 minutes played lead the league in goals against average.

GP = Games played; TOI = Time on ice (in minutes); SA = Shots against; GA = Goals against; SO = Shutouts; GAA = Goals against average; SV% = Save percentage; W = Wins; L = Losses; OT = Overtime/shootout loss

Player	Team	GP	TOI	SA	GA	SO	GAA	SV%	W	L	OTL	SOL
Charline Labonte	Les Canadiennes	20	1144:26	386	29	5	1.52	.925	17	2	0	0
Liz Knox	Brampton Thunder	10	502:00	276	21	2	2.51	.924	7	2	0	0
Erica Howe	Brampton Thunder	17	941:24	495	42	2	2.68	.915	9	5	0	1
Delayne Brian	Calgary Inferno	20	1104:29	500	55	2	2.99	.890	11	5	1	0

== Clarkson Cup playoffs ==
Clarkson Cup semifinals
1	Montreal	2
4	Toronto	0
2	Calgary	2
3	Brampton	0

Clarkson Cup final
1	Montreal	3
2	Calgary	8

== Awards and honors ==
- CWHL Most Valuable Player: Marie-Philip Poulin, Montreal
- CWHL Top Forward: Marie-Philip Poulin, Montreal
- CWHL Defender of the Year: Laura Fortino, Brampton
- CWHL Goaltender of the Year: Charline Labonte, Montreal
- Angela James Bowl winner: Marie-Philip Poulin, Montreal
- CWHL Outstanding Rookie: Elana Lovell, Calgary
- CWHL Coach of the Year: Tyler Fines, Brampton
- CWHL Humanitarian of the Year: Lisa-Marie Breton, Montreal

=== CWHL All-Rookie Team ===
- Goaltender: Sydney Aveson
- Defender: Brigitte Lacquette
- Defender: Sarah Edney
- Forward: Elana Lovell
- Forward: Jillian Saulnier
- Forward: Rebecca Vint
