= National Sports Academy (Lake Placid, New York) =

Location
- 821 Mirror Lake Drive; Lake Placid, New York 12946; United States; 44.2827°N 73.9816°W

Information
- Established: 1977
- CEEB code: 332761
- Head of school: Lisa Wint
- Teaching staff: 10 (as of 2013-14)
- Grades: 8-12, PG
- Enrollment: 65 (as of 2013-14)
- Average class size: 8
- Student to teacher ratio: 6.5 (as of 2013-14)
- Team name: Mountaineers
- Accreditation: NYAIS and NAIS
- Website: http://www.nationalsportsacademy.com/

National Sports Academy was a private preparatory school for winter-sport athletes in Lake Placid, New York, United States. The academy was closed in 2015.

== History ==
The school began in 1977 as Mountain House, a winter tutorial program for student-athletes. The school changed from a winter-only program to a traditional school calendar in 1981 and changed its name to National Sports Academy on March 17, 1989.

=== Campus and Nearby Training Facilities Used by NSA Student Athletes ===
The school covers grades 9-12 and is located in the former Winterset Inn, which housed Italian athletes during the 1980 Winter Olympics. The school's main building which houses a cafeteria, dorm rooms, and classrooms is located directly across from Mirror Lake. The average number of boarding students is around 200 Students per year. The school is located steps from the Olympic Center which is a massive sports facility that houses 3 Hockey rinks and was home to the 1932 and 1980 Olympic Hockey competitions where the United States famously won the Gold medal (1980). The Olympic Center is the home practice and game facility for all of the National Sports Academy hockey players and speed skating athletes. The varsity A boys and girls teams practice daily and host all home games on the Herb Brooks Arena which is a 13,450-seat arena with a full Olympic-sized sheet of ice. Players use the weight rooms, basketball courts and other amenities in the Olympic Center to help train them off-ice. Outside is the Olympic Speed skating oval which has hosted many international competitions, most notably the 1932 and 1980 Olympic games. Alpine skiers are fortunate enough to have one of the best locations in the US for the advancement of their skills. Skiers train at the Olympic Training Center which hosts winter sport athletes from the US and other countries who are living in Lake Placid or in town to train for extended periods of time. This gives NSA student-athletes a first-hand opportunity to train with and observe the training practices of some of the top athletes in their respective sports. The Olympic Sports Complex is the third significant facility that NSA athletes have full access to and use on a daily basis. The current home of the US Olympic Men's and Women's sliding teams. (Luge, Bobsled, and Skeleton) The sliding track was the home of the 32 and 80 Olympic games and has been one of the premier tracks in North America in the past 15 years in terms of training and competition sliding events. Students go to class in the afternoon and end in the late evening.

== Curriculum ==
The school's student-athletes focus on one of ten winter sports: Alpine skiing, freestyle skiing, snowboarding, Nordic skiing, ski jumping, Nordic combined, biathlon, figure skating, luge, and boys' and girls' hockey. Academic studies are addressed by a rigorous college-preparatory curriculum and specialized curricula and tutors for students who travel to compete.

== Extracurricular activities ==
Student groups and activities at National Sports Academy include a community service committee, a cultural arts committee, Coffee Haus, a dodgeball club, ping pong tournaments, a student council, a sustainability and stewardship council, an ultimate Frisbee club, and a yearbook.

== Notable alumni ==
National Sports Academy has had 34 National team members, 21 members of the U.S. Ski Team, five Members US Jr. Luge Team, 2 members of the Czech Women's Ice Hockey Team, and its alumni have won five National Nordic Skiing Titles, 5 Nordic Skiing Medalists, eight Jr. National Skiing Titles, and one Women's National Luge Champion.

- A. J. Kitt, Alpine Skiing
- Duncan Kennedy, Luge
- Cammy Myler, Luge
- Samantha Retrosi, Luge
- Courtney Zablocki, Luge
- Bill Demong, Nordic Combined (gold and silver medalist)
- Tucker West, Luge
- Lindsay Van, Ski Jumper
- Carrie Johnson
- Haley Johnson, Biathlon
- Summer Britchner, Luge
- John Farra, Biathlon
- Ray DiLauro, Ice Hockey
- Aidan Kelly, Luge
- Chris Mazdzer, Luge
- Nicole Giannino, Ice Hockey (Boston Blades, CWHL) Team USA World Inline Hockey Team
- Kali Flanagan, Women's Olympic Gold Medalist
