= Jill Saulnier =

Canadian ice hockey player (born 1992)

- Born: March 7, 1992 (age 34) Halifax, Nova Scotia, Canada
- Height: 5 ft 5 in (165 cm)
- Weight: 146 lb (66 kg; 10 st 6 lb)
- Position: Forward
- Shoots: Left
- PWHL team Former teams: Boston Fleet: New York Sirens; Les Canadiennes de Montréal; Calgary Inferno
- National team: Canada
- Playing career: 2011–present

Jillian Pauline Saulnier (born March 7, 1992) is a Canadian ice hockey player who is a forward for the Boston Fleet of the Professional Women's Hockey League (PWHL). She is a two-time Olympian for Canada, winning a gold medal in 2022 and a silver medal in 2018.

== Playing career ==
Saulnier has competed in five Atlantic Challenge Cups. Saulnier has claimed three gold (2003, 2005, 2007) and two silver medals (2006, 2008). She won a gold medal at Nova Scotia provincials with the Halifax Hawks in 2006. Saulnier captained the Halifax Hawks the following season and was named team MVP. She played for Nova Scotia at the 2007 Esso Women's Nationals and was part of the fourth-place team.

At the 2007 National Women's Under-18 Championships, she played for Team Atlantic and finished in fourth. In 2008, Saulnier captained Team Atlantic at the 2008 National Women's Under-18 Championships. The team finished in eighth place, but Saulnier was honoured with the Most Sportsmanlike Player award.

She played for Team Atlantic again at the 2009 National Women's Under-18 Championships and finished in sixth place. That year, Saulnier also played with the Stoney Creek Junior Sabres in Ontario and claimed a silver medal at the OWHA provincials. Two of her teammates on the Stoney Creek Junior Sabres, Laura Fortino and Jessica Wong, would play with her at the 2009 IIHF World Women's Under-18 Championships in Germany and win a silver medal.

She finished fourth in scoring with the Toronto Jr. Aeros of the Provincial Women's Hockey League in 2009–10. At the league championships, she won a silver medal with Toronto. In 2010, Saulnier won a gold medal with Toronto at the Ontario Women's Hockey Association provincial championship.

=== NCAA ===
In February 2011, she committed to join the women's hockey program at Cornell University. In her first three career NCAA games, she registered seven goals and ten points. In her college debut versus Colgate University on October 25, 2011, Saulnier netted four goals. Her four-goal night was the first for Cornell since Jessica Campbell scored four against Robert Morris in the second game of the 2010–11 season. She scored her first career goal when she was out on the Big Red's first power play of the game. In her next game versus the Yale Bulldogs, she registered one goal and two assists while scoring two goals in her third game versus the Brown Bears women's ice hockey squad. For the month of October 2011, she was tied for first in the ECAC in goals scored (while the other player appeared in eight games). In a game on November 1, 2011, the Cornell Big Red scored at least nine goals in one game for the third consecutive contest. It was senior captain Chelsea Karpenko's 100th career game, as Saulnier led all Big Red players with two goals and three assists in a 9–2 triumph over the Syracuse Orange women's ice hockey program.

=== Hockey Canada ===
In August 2008, Saulnier was a member of Canada's National Women's Under-18 Team, competing in a three-game series against the United States in Lake Placid. The following year, Saulnier was a member of Canada's National Women's Under-18 Team that competed in a three-game series against the United States in Calgary. Also, in 2009, she won a silver medal with Canada's National Women's Under-18 Team at the 2009 IIHF World Women's Under-18 Championships. In a March 24, 2010, contest versus the OWHA All-Stars, Saulnier played for the Canadian National Under 18 Women's Team. Saulnier would register an assist in the contest as the OWHA All-Stars defeated the Under 18 team by a 3–2 tally. In April 2010 she won a gold medal with Canada's National Women's Under-18 Team at the 2010 IIHF World Women's Under-18 Championships in Chicago, beating Team USA in OT.

She played for Canada's National Women's Under-22 Team in a three-game series vs. the United States in Toronto in August 2010. Saulnier was an assistant captain at the 2010 IIHF Under 18 Women's World Championships. She finished fourth in tournament scoring with four goals and six assists in five games.

On January 11, 2022, Saulnier was named to Canada's 2022 Olympic team. The team won the gold medal, defeating the United States in the final 3–2.

=== CWHL ===
Saulnier scored a goal as a member of Team Black in the 2nd Canadian Women's Hockey League All-Star Game.

Appearing with the Calgary Inferno in the 2016 Clarkson Cup finals, Saulnier registered an assist as the Inferno emerged victorious in a convincing 8–3 final.

At the 3rd CWHL All-Star Game, Saulnier and Jess Jones both scored a hat trick, becoming the first competitors in CWHL All-Star Game history to achieve the feat.

On July 12, 2018, Saulnier and teammate Genevieve Lacasse were traded by the Inferno to the Canadiennes de Montreal in exchange for future considerations in the form of player(s) and/or draft pick(s).

=== PWHL ===
Saulnier was drafted in the seventh round of the 2023 PWHL Draft by New York. She scored her first PWHL goal in the first official PWHL game, a 4–0 victory over Toronto on January 1, 2024. She finished the inaugural season with a goal and an assist in 18 games.

On January 21, 2025, early in the 2024–25 season, Saulnier was traded to the Boston Fleet in exchange for forward Taylor Girard. Both players were pointless in five games to start the year. She finished the season with two goals and three assists in 19 games for the Fleet. On June 18, 2025, she signed a one-year contract extension with the Fleet.

== Personal life ==
Saulnier is a member of the LGBTQ community.

== Career statistics ==
=== Regular season and playoffs ===
			Regular season					Playoffs
Season	Team	League	GP	G	A	Pts	PIM	GP	G	A	Pts	PIM
2008–09	Stoney Creek Jr. Sabres	Prov. WHL	28	14	25	39	12	8	4	7	11	12
2009–10	Toronto Jr. Aeros	Prov. WHL	26	19	16	35	20	6	1	7	8	6
2010–11	Toronto Jr. Aeros	Prov. WHL	14	16	6	22	10	2	1	1	2	16
2011–12	Cornell University	ECAC	33	22	30	52	27	—	—	—	—	—
2012–13	Cornell University	ECAC	30	10	33	43	30	—	—	—	—	—
2013–14	Cornell University	ECAC	34	28	28	56	37	—	—	—	—	—
2014–15	Cornell University	ECAC	28	20	24	44	32	—	—	—	—	—
2015–16	Calgary Inferno	CWHL	22	12	10	22	16	3	1	3	4	0
2016–17	Calgary Inferno	CWHL	20	11	7	18	12	—	—	—	—	—
2017–18	Canada	AMHL (Men's)	15	2	6	8	10	—	—	—	—	—
2018–19	Les Canadiennes de Montréal	CWHL	20	12	17	29	12	4	1	4	5	6
2020–21	Montreal	PWHPA	4	2	0	2	4	—	—	—	—	—
2022–23	Team Adidas	PWHPA	20	1	9	10	6	—	—	—	—	—
2023–24	PWHL New York	PWHL	18	1	1	2	10	—	—	—	—	—
2024–25	New York Sirens	PWHL	5	0	0	0	0	—	—	—	—	—
2024–25	Boston Fleet	PWHL	19	2	3	5	8	—	—	—	—	—
PWHL totals			42	3	4	7	18	—	—	—	—	—

=== International ===
Medal record

Women's ice hockey

Representing Canada

Olympic Games
Gold medal – first place	2022 Beijing	Team
Silver medal – second place	2018 Pyeongchang	Team

World Championships
Gold medal – first place	2021 Canada	
Bronze medal – third place	2019 Finland	
Silver medal – second place	2016 Canada	
Silver medal – second place	2015 Sweden	

World U18 Championships
Gold medal – first place	2010 United States	

Year	Team	Event	Result	GP	G	A	Pts	PIM
2009	Canada	U18	2nd place, silver medalist(s)	5	0	3	3	4
2010	Canada	U18	1st place, gold medalist(s)	5	4	6	10	2
2015	Canada	WC	2nd place, silver medalist(s)	5	0	1	1	0
2016	Canada	WC	2nd place, silver medalist(s)	5	1	2	3	4
2018	Canada	OG	2nd place, silver medalist(s)	5	1	1	2	0
2019	Canada	WC	3rd place, bronze medalist(s)	7	0	1	1	6
2021	Canada	WC	1st place, gold medalist(s)	7	0	0	0	4
2022	Canada	OG	1st place, gold medalist(s)	7	0	2	2	0
Junior totals				10	4	9	13	6
Senior totals				36	2	7	9	14

== Awards and honours ==
=== Cornell ===
- 2012 Recipient, Cornell Class of '14 Rookie of the Year Award
- Quill and Dagger Senior Honor Society
