= Erica Howe =

Canadian ice hockey player

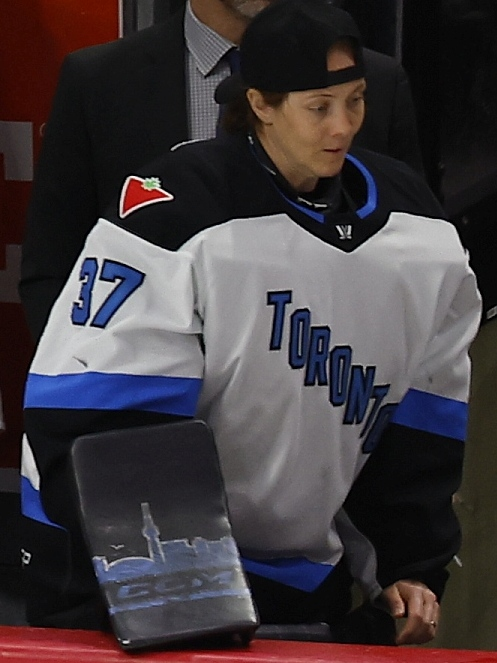
- Howe with PWHL Toronto in 2024
- Born: July 17, 1992 (age 34) Ottawa, Ontario, Canada
- Height: 5 ft 9 in (175 cm)
- Weight: 152 lb (69 kg; 10 st 12 lb)
- Position: Goaltender
- Caught: Left
- Played for: PWHL Toronto; PWHPA; Brampton Thunder; Ottawa Lady Senators; Clarkson Golden Knights
- National team: Canada
- Playing career: 2008–2024
Medal record
U18 World Championships
Gold medal – first place	2010 United States
World Championships
Silver medal – second place	2016 Canada
Nations Cup
Silver medal – second place	2017 Germany	Tournament

Erica Howe (born July 17, 1992) is a Canadian former professional ice hockey goaltender. As a member of the gold medal winning squad at the 2010 IIHF World Women's U18 Championship, a hockey card of her was featured in the Upper Deck 2010 World of Sports card series. She was the first goaltender selected in the 2014 CWHL Draft, claimed by the Brampton Thunder. She made her debut with the Canada women's national ice hockey team at the 2014 4 Nations Cup. After the Thunder moved to Markham for the 2017-18 season, Erica backstopped the team to the Clarkson Cup, and was named the Clarkson Cup Playoffs MVP.

== Playing career ==
Howe was the starting goaltender for the Ottawa Lady Senators of the Provincial Women's Hockey League in 2009–10.

=== Hockey Canada ===
She was an assistant captain for 2008 Team Ontario Red and was a member of the 2009 Gold-Medal winning Team Ontario Red at the Under-18 Nationals. Howe was invited to the 2009 Canadian Women’s Under-18 Team Strength and Conditioning Camp along with the 2009 Canadian Women’s Under-18 Selection Camp. In August 2009, she was a member of the Canadian Women’s Under-18 Team squad that participated in a three-game series vs. Team USA. In April 2010, Howe was the goaltender for Canada at the Under-18 World Championship, as the Canadian team won the Gold Medal. To celebrate the gold medal win, she participated in the Canada Celebrates Event on June 30 in Edmonton, Alberta which recognized the Canadian Olympic and World hockey champions from the 2009–10 season .

=== NCAA ===
Howe joined the Clarkson Golden Knights women's ice hockey program in the autumn of 2010. She was also recruited by Vermont, Cornell, St. Lawrence, Connecticut and Brown. On January 28, 2011, Howe had twenty-six saves vs. Quinnipiac (including eleven in the third period) in a 3–2 road win. The following day, she posted twenty saves in a 3–2 win vs. Princeton. With the two wins, she extended her winning streak to four games. During the month of October 2011, she played every second of goal for the Clarkson Golden Knights. She helped the Golden Knights enjoy a seven-game unbeaten streak (4–0–3) while playing in two games with more than thirty saves.

The 2013–14 Clarkson Golden Knights women's ice hockey season marked her final season with the program. Of note, she was the starting goaltender as Clarkson captured the 2014 NCAA National Collegiate Women's Ice Hockey Tournament.

=== CWHL ===
Howe gained the win for Team Red in the inaugural 2014 CWHL All-Star Game. Howe would return to the CWHL All-Star Game in 2017, played for Team Blue in a 9-5 loss at the 3rd CWHL All-Star Game.

Making her CWHL debut in an October 19, 2014 home game against the Calgary Inferno, Howe made 33 saves in a 5-2 loss. In her second game, a November 15 home contest against the Montreal Stars, Howe would record the first win of her CWHL career. Needing only 19 saves, Howe would prevail in a 4-2 final.

=== PWHL ===
Howe was undrafted at the 2023 PWHL Draft but spent the inaugural 2023-24 PWHL season as the backup goaltender for the Toronto Sceptres.

She played her first game on January 13, 2024 against the Ottawa Charge in relief of Kristen Campbell after the first period.

She recorded her first win on March 30, 2024 against the Boston Fleet finishing the game with 28 saves.

She finished the season with three appearances (1-1-0).

On June 20, 2024, Howe announced her retirement on her Instagram account.

== Career statistics ==
=== Regular season and playoffs ===
Bold indicates led league

			Regular season									Playoffs
Season	Team	League	GP	W	L	OTL	MIN	GA	SO	GAA	SV%	GP	W	L	MIN	GA	SO	GAA	SV%
2010–11	Clarkson Golden Knights	ECAC	25	10	7	5	1440:21	45	2	1.87	.928	–	–	–	–	–	–	–	–
2011–12	Clarkson Golden Knights	ECAC	37	22	10	5	2200:21	64	7	1.75	.927	–	–	–	–	–	–	–	–
2012–13	Clarkson Golden Knights	ECAC	37	27	10	0	2217:21	64	6	1.73	.931	–	–	–	–	–	–	–	–
2013–14	Clarkson Golden Knights	ECAC	41	31	5	5	**2459:53**	45	**14**	1.10	.941	–	–	–	–	–	–	–	–
2014–15	Brampton Thunder	CWHL	17	4	8	0	683:01	42	0	3.69	.898	–	–	–	–	–	–	–	–
2015–16	Brampton Thunder	CWHL	17	9	5	1	955:25	42	2	2.65	.915	2	0	2	120:00	8	0	4.00	.875
2016–17	Brampton Thunder	CWHL	14	7	5	1	784:29	29	2	2.22	.919	–	–	–	–	–	–	–	–
2017–18	Markham Thunder	CWHL	16	8	5	2	934:00	34	3	2.18	.930	3	**3**	**0**	203:14	**3**	0	**0.89**	**.963**
2018–19	Markham Thunder	CWHL	20	9	8	1	1149:16	49	2	2.56	.924	3	1	2	180:00	11	0	7.33	.901
2022–23	Sonnet	PWHPA	4	–	–	–	237:00	14	0	3.54	.890	–	–	–	–	–	–	–	–
2023–24	PWHL Toronto	PWHL	3	1	1	0	158:24	5	0	1.89	.921	–	–	–	–	–	–	–	–
CWHL totals			80	37	31	5	4506:11	196	9	2.61	.918	8	1	4	503:14	22	0	2.62	.914
PWHL totals			3	1	1	0	158:24	5	0	1.89	.921	–	–	–	–	–	–	–	–

=== International ===
Year	Team	Event	Result	GP	W	L	T/OT	MIN	GA	SO	GAA	SV%
2010	Canada	U18	1st place, gold medalist(s)	2	1	0	0	90:08	3	0	2.00	.700
Junior totals				2	1	0	0	90:08	3	0	2.00	.700

== Awards and honours ==
- ECAC Goaltender of the Week (Week of February 1, 2011)
- 2010–11 ECAC All-Rookie team
- ECAC Goaltender of the Week (Week of October 18, 2011)
- ECAC Goaltender of the Week (Week of October 25, 2011)
- ECAC Goaltender of the Month (Month of October 2011)
- ECAC Defensive Player of the week (Week of November 14, 2011)
- ECAC Goaltender of the Month (Month of November 2011)
- Nominee, 2012 ECAC Goaltender of the Year
- Finalist, ECAC Player of the Year (2011–12)
- 2013 ECAC Goaltender of the Year
- 2013 All-USCHO.com All-Star team
