= Sarah Edney =

Canadian ice hockey player

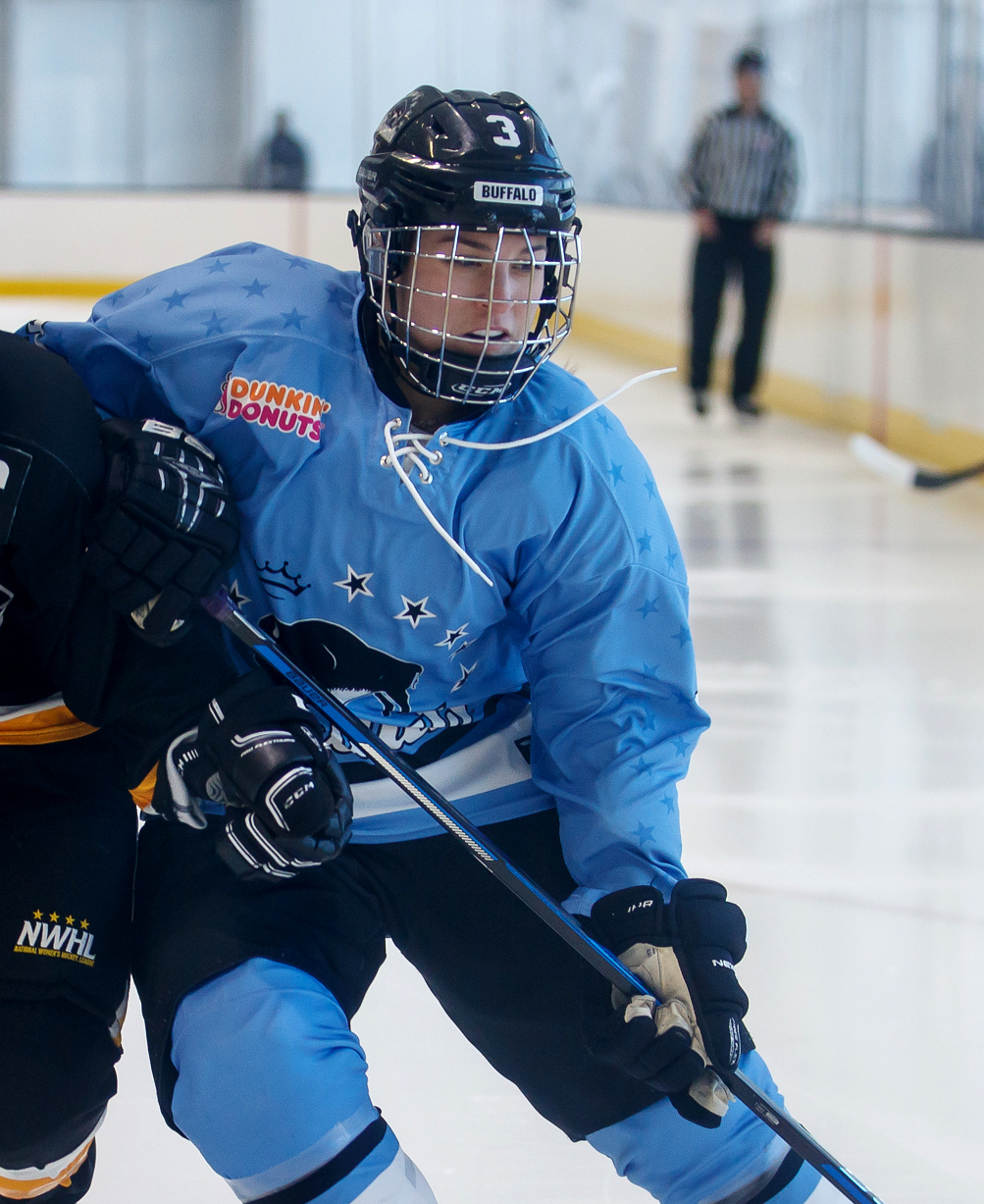
- Sarah Edney playing for the Buffalo Beauts in 2018
- Born: September 2, 1993 (age 32) Mississauga, Ontario, Canada
- Height: 5 ft 5 in (165 cm)
- Weight: 133 lb (60 kg; 9 st 7 lb)
- Position: Defence
- Shoots: Left
- Peel Div. PWHL ECAC CWHL AWIHL team: Our Lady of Mount Carmel; Mississauga; Harvard Crimson; Brampton Thunder; Sydney Sirens
- National team: Canada
- Playing career: 2009–present

Sarah Edney
Medal record

Women's ice hockey

Representing Canada

IIHF U18 Women's Worlds
Silver medal – second place	2011 Sweden	2011 Tournament

Nations Cup
Gold medal – first place	2015 Germany	2015 Tournament

4 Nations Cup
Silver medal – second place	2015 Sweden	Team

Sarah Edney is a Canadian ice hockey player. She was selected first overall by the Brampton Thunder in the 2015 CWHL Draft. She made her debut with the Canada women's national ice hockey team at the 2015 4 Nations Cup in Sundsvall, Sweden.

== Playing career ==
Edney played high school hockey at Our Lady of Mount Carmel in Mississauga, Ontario. While a student there, she also competed in softball and track and field. In her junior season, she was named an assistant captain in hockey. She also played hockey for the Mississauga Junior Chiefs. During her career with the Junior Chiefs, Edney led the squad to gold and silver medals in the Ontario provincial championships. Sarah now lives in Australia and plays in a non-professional league.

=== Hockey Canada ===
At the 2011 IIHF Women's Under 18 championships, she was the captain of Team Canada. She would help the team earn a silver medal. In the same year, she was the Team Ontario captain at the 2011 Canada Winter Games, where she claimed a silver medal.

She was a member of Canada's National Women's Development Team that won a gold medal at the 2015 Nations Cup (formerly known as the Meco Cup).

=== NCAA ===
Edney committed to join the Harvard Crimson of the Eastern College Athletic Conference.

=== NWHL ===
On August 31, 2017, Edney signed with the Buffalo Beauts as a free agent, joining former Thunder teammates Jess Jones and Rebecca Vint who also signed with the Beauts. Edney participated in the 3rd NWHL All-Star Game.

=== AWIHL ===
Sarah moved to Sydney, Australia, and has been playing for the Sydney Sirens in the Australian Women's Ice Hockey League since 2019.

== Career stats ==
=== Hockey Canada ===
Year	Event	Team	GP	G	A	Pts	PIM
2009	Under 18 Nationals	Ontario Blue	5	0	2	2	4
2011	IIHF Under 18 Worlds	Canada	4	1	2	3	2
2011	Canada Winter Games	Ontario	5	1	3	4	0

== Awards and honours ==
- Mississauga Female High School Athlete of the Year in 2010-11
- Our Lady of Mount Carmel High School Hockey Most Valuable Player (2009–10)
- Our Lady of Mount Carmel Junior Student Athlete of the Year
- Our Lady of Mount Carmel Senior Student Athlete of the Year
- Toronto Star High School Female Athlete of the Week (Week of January 12, 2010)

=== NWHL ===
- NWHL Co-Player of the Week, Awarded March 12, 2018

Awards and achievements
Preceded by Laura Fortino	CWHL first overall draft pick 2015	Succeeded by Kayla Tutino
