= Markham Thunder =

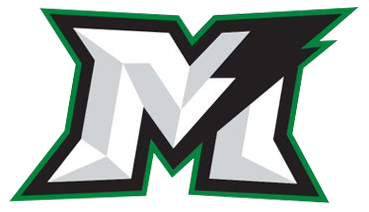
- City: Markham, Ontario
- League: Canadian Women's Hockey League
- Founded: 1998
- Folded: 2019
- Home arena: Thornhill Community Centre
- Colours: Black, green, white
- General manager: Chelsea Purcell
- Head coach: Jim Jackson
- Captain: Jocelyne Larocque
- Website: markham.thecwhl.com

Franchise history
- 1998–2017: Brampton Thunder/Canadettes-Thunder
- 2017–2019: Markham Thunder

Championships
- Playoff championships: NWHL: 1998–99, 2006–07; CWHL: 2007–08, 2017–18

The Markham Thunder was a professional women's ice hockey team in the Canadian Women's Hockey League (CWHL). From 1998 through 2017, the franchise was known as the Brampton Thunder and Brampton Canadettes-Thunder before relocating from Brampton, Ontario, to Markham, Ontario, for the 2017–18 season. The CWHL ceased operations in 2019 and no further statements or actions were taken with the franchise.

== Team history ==
Brampton Thunder logo, used from 2014 to 2017

The city of Brampton had a long history of women's ice hockey, starting with the creation of the Brampton Canadettes in 1963, whose management created the Dominion Ladies Hockey Tournament in 1967 (operating today as the Canadettes Easter Tournament).

In 1998, after local athlete Cassie Campbell returned home from her silver-medal victory with Team Canada in the successful introduction of women's ice hockey at the 1998 Nagano Olympics, she commiserated with Brampton acting mayor Sue Fennell about the lack of a top level women's team in Brampton. Fennell purchased a franchise, which she named the Brampton Thunder, in the Central Ontario Women's Hockey League (COWHL), a league which had operated since 1980. From its first 1998–99 COWHL season, the Thunder played its home games in the Brampton Centre for Sports & Entertainment (renamed the Powerade Centre in 2005), which also started operation in 1998.

On 15 February 1999, during the 1998–99 COWHL season, Fennell was instrumental in turning the COWHL into the National Women's Hockey League (NWHL), becoming its first President.

The Brampton Thunder won the first NWHL Championship Cup, in 1998–99. The Thunder would also win the final NWHL Championship Cup, in 2006–07. In between, the Thunder appeared in three other NWHL Championship Cup finals, but were defeated by the Beatrice Aeros in 2002, the Calgary Oval X-Treme in 2004, and the Montreal Axion in 2006. They also played in the Esso Women's Nationals and were victorious in 2006, defeating the Montreal Axion to claim the national title. The Thunder also had the distinction of having their home arena serve as the site of all NWHL Championship Cup games.

The Brampton Thunder was a significant contributor to the roster of the Canadian national women's hockey team at the 2006 Winter Olympics, with three players (Vicky Sunohara, Jayna Hefford, and Gillian Ferrari) contributing to Canada's gold medal win. Brampton Thunder player Kathleen Kauth also participated in the 2006 Winter Olympics, playing for the bronze medal-winning American national women's hockey team. A fifth Brampton Thunder player, goaltender Cindy Eadie, also participated in the Olympics, in 2004, with the Canadian softball team.

In 2007, the NWHL suspended operations. Players from the seven disbanded NWHL teams joined seven corresponding teams in the new Canadian Women's Hockey League (CWHL). Players from the NWHL Brampton Thunder joined the new CWHL franchise Brampton Canadettes-Thunder (generally called the Brampton Thunder), continuing the legacy of Brampton's women's ice hockey teams, starting with the 1963 Canadettes team and the 1998 Thunders team.

On January 18, 2011, the Thunder competed against the Montreal Stars at the Invista Centre in Kingston, Ontario - team captain Jayna Hefford’s hometown. Her number 15 was raised to the rafters of the Invista Centre on behalf of the Kingston Area Minor Hockey Association. As of 2012, no sweaters bearing Hefford’s number will be used in Kingston Minor Hockey. On November 2, 2011, Jesse Scanzano appeared in one game for the Brampton Thunder, on loan from the Toronto Aeros. The game was an exhibition contest versus her alma mater, the Mercyhurst Lakers. In the second period of said contest, Scanzano scored the game-winning goal as the Thunder defeated the Lakers 3–1.

In the CWHL championship game of the 2012 Clarkson Cup, Brampton fell to the Montreal Stars 4–2. Two Thunder players earned awards for their play in the 2012 Clarkson Cup, with the Outstanding Defender award going to Molly Engstrom, while netminder Liz Knox earned the Outstanding Goaltender award.

At the 3rd CWHL All-Star Game, Jess Jones of the Thunder, along with Jillian Saulnier both scored a hat trick, becoming the first competitors in CWHL All-Star Game history to achieve the feat.

Before the start of the 2017–18 CWHL season, the Brampton Thunder relocated 36 km (22 miles) east, to Markham, Ontario, with home games at the Thornhill Community Centre, in Markham's Thornhill neighbourhood. The renamed Markham Thunder won the 2018 Clarkson Cup as CWHL Playoffs Champions. Against the Kunlun Red Star for the Clarkson Cup championship game, Markham's Laura Stacey scored with 2:11 left in the 4-on-4 overtime for a 2–1 victory and its first Cup win.

== Season-by-season ==
Year	GP	W	L	T/OTL	GF	GA	Pts	Finish	Playoffs
1998–99	40	30	7	3	203	76	63	2nd, Western	Won NWHL Championship
1999–00	40	29	5	6	208	64	64	2nd, Western	Lost Western Division Final
2000–01	40	30	7	3	223	82	63	2nd, Western	Eliminated in first round
2001–02	30	8	14	8	223	82	63	3rd, Western	Did not qualify
2002–03	36	27	9	0	152	71	54	2nd, Central	Lost first round
2003–04	36	28	6	2	190	72	58	2nd, Central	Lost first round
2004–05	36	30	4	2	165	70	63	1st, Central	Lost first round
2005–06	36	19	12	5	113	97	43	3rd	Lost in final game
2006–07	16	8	8	0	71	66	16	3rd	Won NWHL championship
2007–08	30	22	7	1	111	59	45	1st, Central	Won CWHL championship, 4–3 (OT) vs. Mississauga Chiefs
2008–09	26	19	6	1	n/a	n/a	39	2nd	Lost first round vs. Mississauga Chiefs
2009–10	29	9	19	1	n/a	n/a	27	4th	Lost semifinals, 2–3 vs. Montreal Stars
2010–11	26	19	6	1	111	69	39	2nd	Lost first round
2011–12	27	18	7	2	102	80	40	3rd	Lost 2012 Clarkson Cup, 2–4 vs. Montreal Stars
2012–13	24	10	12	2	71	83	22	3rd	Eliminated 2013 Clarkson Cup round-robin
2013–14	24	5	16	3	43	99	13	5th	Did not qualify
2014–15	24	6	16	2	46	98	14	5th	Did not qualify
2015–16	24	16	7	1	91	67	33	3rd	Lost 2016 Clarkson Cup semifinals, 0–2 vs. Calgary Inferno
2016–17	24	13	10	1	76	63	26	3rd	Lost 2017 Clarkson Cup semifinals, 0–2 vs. Les Canadiennes de Montreal
2017–18	28	14	7	7	80	68	35	4th	Won 2018 Clarkson Cup championship game, 2–1 (OT) vs. Kunlun Red Star WIH
2018–19	28	13	11	4	85	80	30	3rd	Lost 2019 Clarkson Cup semifinals, 1–2 vs. Les Canadiennes

Note: GP = Games played, W = Wins, L = Losses, T = Ties, OTL = Overtime losses, GF = Goals for, GA = Goals against, Pts = Points.

== NCAA exhibitions ==
Date	NCAA school	Score	Goal scorers
Oct. 25, 2011	Cornell Big Red women's ice hockey	Cornell, 6–0	None
Nov. 2, 2011	Mercyhurst Lakers women's ice hockey	Brampton, 3–1	Jayna Hefford, Jesse Scanzano, Vicki Bendus
Sept. 22, 2018	Mercyhurst Lakers women's ice hockey	Markham, 3–1	Jamie Lee Rattray, Ella Matteucci, Nicole Kosta

== CWHL draft picks ==
- The following is a listing of their top draft picks. For full draft information, please see the respective draft pages.

Draft	Pick	Player	Former team
2010	5	Delaney Collins	Alberta Pandas women's ice hockey
2011	4	Vicki Bendus	Mercyhurst Lakers women's ice hockey
2011	6	Courtney Birchard	New Hampshire Wildcats women's ice hockey
2015	1	Sarah Edney	Harvard University
2016	3	Laura Stacey	Dartmouth College
2017	3	Nicole Kosta	Quinnipiac University
2018	3	Victoria Bach	Boston University

== Team captains ==
Year(s)	Captain
2011–13	Jayna Hefford
2013–14	Tara Gray
2014–19	Jocelyne Larocque

== Scoring leaders ==
=== Year-by-year ===
Season	Leader (F)	GP	G	A	Pts	Leader (D)	GP	G	A	Pts	PPG	SHG	GWG
2008–09	Jayna Hefford	27	26	32	58	Molly Engstrom	28	9	11	20	Engstrom (7)	Lori Dupuis (2)	Hefford (6)
2010–11	Jayna Hefford	27	25	23	48	Molly Engstrom	28	2	20	22	Hefford (9)	Jayna Hefford and Andrea Ironside (1)	Jayna Hefford and Gillian Apps (4)
2011–12	Gillian Apps	27	19	20	39	Molly Engstrom	27	4	23	27	Jayna Hefford (8)	Cherie Piper (1)	Apps (4)
2012–13	Jayna Hefford	21	15	12	27	Courtney Birchard	24	0	9	9	Gillian Apps (5)	Three tied with 1	Apps (3)
2013–14	Danielle Skirrow	24	5	10	15	Ashley Pendleton	22	1	9	10	Two tied with 2	None	Sasha Nanji (2)
2014–15	Jess Jones	24	7	9	16	Laura Fortino	24	5	10	15	Jones, Carly Mercer (3)	Jones, Fielding Montgomery (1)	Three tied with 1
2015–16	Jamie Lee Rattray	22	13	16	29	Laura Fortino	24	8	20	28	Rattray (5)	Rebecca Vint (2); Fielding Montgomery (2)	Jess Jones (5)
2016–17	Jess Jones	24	17	20	37	Laura Fortino	20	6	13	19	Jones (5)	None	Jones (3)
2017-18	Jamie Lee Rattray	28	22	17	39	Kristen Barbara	28	4	8	12	Kristen Richards (4)	Rattray (1)	Rattray, Jenna McParland, Kristen Richards, Taylor Woods (2)
2018-19	Victoria Bach	26	19	13	32	Laura Fortino	26	5	13	18			

== Awards winners ==
- Lori Dupuis, Top forward in the 2010 Clarkson Cup
- Molly Engstrom, Top defender in the 2010 Clarkson Cup
- Bobbi-Jo Slusar, Player of the Game, 2010 Clarkson Cup Final
- Courtney Birchard, Outstanding Rookie of the Year, 2011
- Liz Knox, Top Goaltender of the Clarkson Cup, 2012
- Laura Fortino, Defensemen of the Year, 2015–16
- Tyler Fines, Coach of the Year, 2015–16
- Jess Jones, Co-winner, 2017 Angela James Bowl
- Laura Stacey, Rookie of the Year, 2016–17
- Jamie Lee Rattray, 2018 Jayna Hefford Trophy
- Erica Howe, Most Valuable Player, 2018 Clarkson Cup
- Victoria Bach, Rookie of the Year, 2018–19
- Jim Jackson, Coach of the Year, 2018–19

== Notable players ==
- Gillian Apps
- Victoria Bach
- Megan Bozek
- Delaney Collins
- Lori Dupuis
- Molly Engstrom
- Laura Fortino
- Jayna Hefford
- Erica Howe
- Jocelyne Larocque
- Cherie Piper
- Jamie Lee Rattray
- Laura Stacey
- Vicky Sunohara

== Honours ==
As the Brampton Thunder

- The Abby Hoffman Cup (Canadian champions): 2005-06
- NWHL Cup (playoff champion): 1998-99
- NWHL Central Division (regular season): 2004-05, 2006-07
- Ontario Women's Hockey Association (Ontario AAA champions): 2002-03, 2004-05, 2005-06

As the Brampton Canadette-Thunder

- CWHL Championship (playoff champion): 2007-08
- Central Division (regular season): 2007-08

As the Markham Thunder

- Clarkson Cup (Canadian champions): 2017-18
