= Laura Fortino =

Canadian-Italian ice hockey player and coach

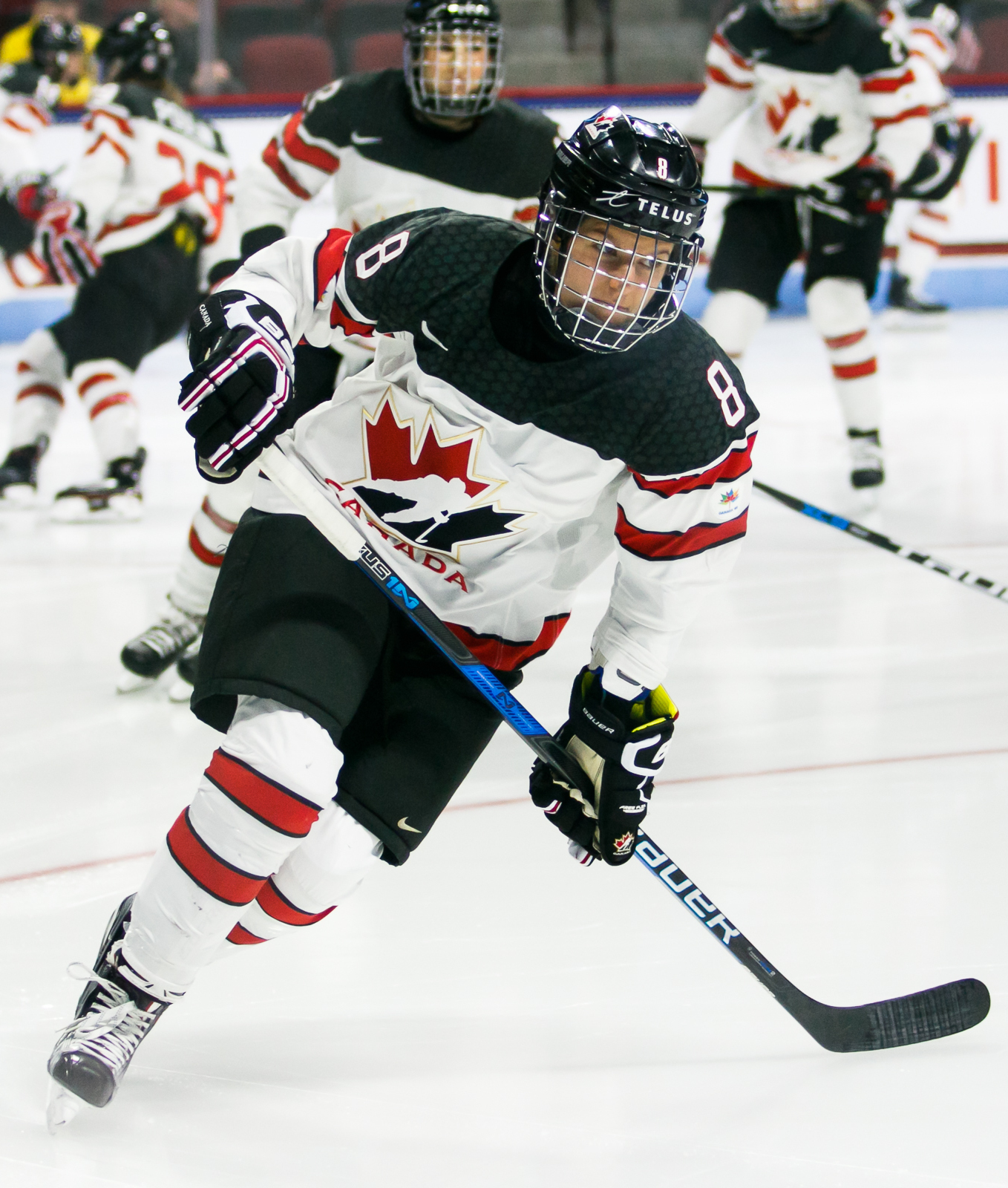
- Fortino representing Canada in 2017
- Born: January 30, 1991 (age 35) Hamilton, Ontario, Canada
- Height: 5 ft 4 in (163 cm)
- Weight: 143 lb (65 kg; 10 st 3 lb)
- Position: Defence
- Shoots: Left
- IHLW team Former teams: Real Torino: PWHPA Team Harvey's; PWHPA Toronto; Markham Thunder; Cornell Big Red; EVB Eagles Südtirol; AHC Lakers
- Coached for: Hamilton Bulldogs
- National team: Canada and Italy
- Playing career: 2009–present
- Coaching career: 2022–present
Medal record
Representing Canada
Olympic Games
Gold medal – first place	2014 Sochi	Team
Silver medal – second place	2018 Pyeongchang	Team
World Championship
Gold medal – first place	2012 United States
Silver medal – second place	2013 Canada
Silver medal – second place	2015 Sweden
Silver medal – second place	2016 Canada
Silver medal – second place	2017 United States
Bronze medal – third place	2019 Finland

Laura Michele Fortino (born January 30, 1991) is a Canadian and Italian ice hockey defenceman and coach. She has played in the Italian Hockey League Women (IHLW) with Real Torino HC Femminile since 2025. A former member of the Canadian national team, she won two Olympic medals and six World Championship medals during 2011 to 2019.

Fortino was selected first overall by the Brampton Thunder in the 2014 CWHL Draft. She played five seasons in the Canadian Women's Hockey League (CWHL), during which she was named the CWHL Defenceman of the Year for the 2015–16 season and won the Clarkson Cup in 2018 with the Markham Thunder (called Brampton Thunder during 1998 to 2017).

== Playing career ==
In 2004, Fortino played minor ice hockey with the Hamilton Reps in the boys OHF Bantam AA and she won a silver medal at the Ontario provincials, with honourable mention going to her AA defence partner Kyle Rooney.

As a member of the Stoney Creek Sabres, she won a bronze medal at the 2007 Provincial Women's Hockey League (Provincial WHL or PWHL; not to be confused with the Professional Women's Hockey League) championships. At the 2007 National Women's Under-18 Championships in Kitchener, Ontario, she won a gold medal with Ontario Red.

The following year, Fortino won a gold medal with Stoney Creek at the Ontario Women's Hockey Association (OWHA) provincials and at the 2008 Provincial WHL championship. In 2007–08, Fortino led Provincial WHL defencemen in scoring. She won a gold medal with Ontario Red at the 2008 National Women’s Under-18 Championships in Napanee, Ontario.

In 2009, Fortino won a silver medal with Stoney Creek at the OWHA provincials. Fortino ranked second among PWHL defencemen in scoring in 2008–09, with 7 goals and 17 assists for 24 points in 29 games.

=== College ===
Fortino joined the Cornell Big Red women's ice hockey program in 2009 and she earned All-America honours as a freshman. She led all NCAA defencemen, Cornell defencemen, and Cornell freshmen in scoring in the 2009–10 season. As a member of the Big Red, she played in the NCAA championship game at the Frozen Four in 2010.

Fortino was a Patty Kazmaier Award top-ten finalist in 2011 and 2012.

=== Hockey Canada ===
On October 3, 2011, she was named to the Team Canada roster that participated in the 2011 4 Nations Cup.

Named to 2014 Olympic roster for Canada. In August 2008, Fortino was a member of Canada's National Women's Under-18 Team for a three-game series against the United States in Lake Placid. Later that year, she would win a silver medal with Canada's National Women’s Under-18 Team at the 2008 IIHF World Women’s Under-18 Championship in Calgary.

The following year, she participated with Canada's National Women's Under-22 Team for a three-game exhibition versus the United States in Calgary. At the 2009 IIHF World Women's Under 18 championships, Fortino won a silver medal in Füssen, Germany. She was part of another three game exhibition series with the Under 22 team vs. the United States in August 2010. Fortino won a gold medal with Canada's National Women's Under-22 Team at the 2010 MLP Cup in Ravensburg, Germany. In the semifinal of the 2011 MLP Cup, Fortino scored a goal in a 9–0 rout of Russia to advance to the gold medal game. Fortino would score another goal as Canada beat Sweden in the final by a 6–0 tally to claim the gold medal. In March 2011, she was invited to the Canadian national women's ice hockey team selection camp to determine the final roster for the 2011 IIHF Women's World Championships. In a March 31, 2012 exhibition game versus the United States, Laura Fortino scored her first international goal in a 1–0 win at the Ottawa Civic Centre. She scored at 17:26 of the second period and was assisted by Marie-Philip Poulin, as she scored on American goaltender Molly Schaus. Fortino was credited for an assist feeding the puck to teammate, Marie-Philip Poulin when she scored the winning goal in Sochi against the United States.

=== Professional ===
On August 19, 2014, Fortino was chosen first overall in the 2014 CWHL Draft by the Brampton Thunder. She was the second alumna of the Stoney Creek Junior Sabres (PWHL) to be selected first overall.

She was named alternate captain in the 2015–16 season.

=== Italy ===
Fortino was named an alternate captain for Team Italy at the 2026 Winter Olympics in Milan Cortina. In Italy's third game of the Olympics, Fortino logged an assist, also recording 30:22 of ice time in a 3-2 win on February 9, 2026, versus Japan.

In the quarterfinals of the 2026 Olympics, Italy played the United States, marking the first time they played each other in women's ice hockey at the Winter Olympics. Fortino logged 29:57 of ice time in a 6-0 loss.

== Personal life ==
Fortino was born and raised in Hamilton, Ontario, Canada. She is of Italian descent and holds citizenship in Canada and Italy. She is a distant relative of John Fortino of the Fortinos supermarket chain.

== Awards and honours ==
- Cornell's co-Rookie of the Year 2009–10
- ECAC First All-Star Team 2009–10
- ECAC All-Rookie Team 2009–10
- RBK Hockey/AHCA Women’s Division I 2009–10 First Team All-American
- 2011 First Team All-America selection
- 2011–12 CCM Hockey Women’s Division I All-American: First Team
- Player of the Game for Canada, 2012 IIHF Women's World Championship, April 8 contest vs. Finland
- Gold medal recipient at the 2011 "Expressive Italian Hand Talkers Competition"
- Nominated for 2015–2016 CWHL Most Valuable Player
- 2015–16 CWHL Defenceman of the Year

== Career statistics ==
=== Regular season and playoffs ===
			Regular season					Playoffs
Season	Team	League	GP	G	A	Pts	PIM	GP	G	A	Pts	PIM
2006–07	Stoney Creek Sabres	PWHL	32	7	22	29	18	5	1	2	3	0
2007–08	Stoney Creek Sabres	PWHL	28	7	23	30	8	7	1	5	6	4
2008–09	Stoney Creek Sabres	PWHL	29	7	17	24	14	8	4	4	8	4
2008–09	Burlington Barracudas	CWHL	3	0	1	1	2	—	—	—	—	—
2009–10	Cornell Big Red	NCAA	33	13	21	34	2	—	—	—	—	—
2010–11	Cornell Big Red	NCAA	33	9	31	40	20	—	—	—	—	—
2011–12	Cornell Big Red	NCAA	33	8	29	37	24	—	—	—	—	—
2012–13	Cornell Big Red	NCAA	34	5	16	21	22	—	—	—	—	—
2013–14	Canada	AMHL	16	0	3	3	2	—	—	—	—	—
2014–15	Brampton Thunder	CWHL	24	5	10	15	8	—	—	—	—	—
2015–16	Brampton Thunder	CWHL	24	8	20	28	10	2	0	0	0	0
2016–17	Brampton Thunder	CWHL	20	6	13	19	34	—	—	—	—	—
2017–18	Canada	AMHL	13	1	7	8	2	—	—	—	—	—
2017–18	Markham Thunder	CWHL	2	0	1	1	0	3	0	1	1	0
2018–19	Markham Thunder	CWHL	26	5	13	18	4	1	0	0	0	0
2019–20	GTA West	PWHPA	—	—	—	—	—	—	—	—	—	—
2020–21	Toronto	PWHPA	4	0	2	2	0	—	—	—	—	—
2021–22	Toronto	PWHPA	9	3	6	9	4	—	—	—	—	—
2022–23	Team Harvey's	PWHPA	20	4	9	13	2	—	—	—	—	—
2023–24	EV Bozen Eagles	IHLW	2	2	1	3	0	2	1	9	10	2
2023–24	EV Bozen Eagles	EWHL	3	2	3	5	0	—	—	—	—	—
2024–25	AHC Lakers	IHLW	5	8	3	11	6	4	2	5	7	6
Provincial WHL totals			89	21	62	83	40	20	6	11	17	8
NCAA totals			133	35	97	132	68	–	–	–	–	–
CWHL totals			99	24	58	82	58	–	–	–	–	–
PWHPA totals			20	4	9	13	2	–	–	–	–	–
IWHL totals			7	10	4	14	6	6	3	14	17	8
EWHL totals			3	2	3	5	0	–	–	–	–	–

=== International ===
Year	Team	Event	Result	GP	G	A	Pts	PIM
2008	Canada U18	WW18	2nd place, silver medalist(s)	4	1	4	5	0
2009	Canada U18	WW18	2nd place, silver medalist(s)	5	0	4	4	0
2012	Canada	WW	1st place, gold medalist(s)	5	2	2	4	6
2013	Canada	WW	2nd place, silver medalist(s)	5	0	2	2	0
2014	Canada	OG	1st place, gold medalist(s)	5	0	1	1	0
2015	Canada	WW	2nd place, silver medalist(s)	5	1	0	1	0
2016	Canada	WW	2nd place, silver medalist(s)	5	1	2	3	2
2017	Canada	WW	2nd place, silver medalist(s)	5	0	1	1	4
2018	Canada	OG	2nd place, silver medalist(s)	5	0	2	2	0
2019	Canada	WW	3rd place, bronze medalist(s)	7	0	4	4	2
2026	Italy	OG	8th	5	0	1	1	0
2026	Italy	WW (Div IA)	1st place, gold medalist(s)	5	1	5	6	0
Junior totals				9	1	8	9	0
Senior totals				52	5	20	25	14

Awards and achievements
Preceded by Jessica Wong	CWHL first overall draft pick 2014	Succeeded by Sarah Edney
