= 2016 CWHL Draft =

General information
- Date: August 21, 2016
- Location: Mississauga, Ontario

Overview
- First selection: Kayla Tutino

The 2016 draft for the Canadian Women's Hockey League took place on August 21, 2016. Players must register before midnight on August 1, 2016, and pay an entry fee of CDN $150.

By virtue of finishing with the worst record during the 2015-16 CWHL regular season, the Boston Blades selected first overall. Of note, it signified the first time that the Blades ever held the first pick overall in the history of the CWHL Draft.

Following the Blades with the second pick overall shall be the Toronto Furies. The Furies cross-town rivals, the Brampton Thunder have the third pick overall. Despite having finished with the best regular season record, Les Canadiennes de Montreal shall select fourth overall while the defending Clarkson Cup champion Calgary Inferno shall select fifth overall.

With the first pick overall, the Boston Blades selected Canadian-born Kayla Tutino, most recently of the Boston University Terriers women's ice hockey program. As a side note, the Blades also held the last pick overall in the draft, taking forward Jennifer Currie of UMass Boston in the sixteenth round.

Forward Claudia Tellez of the Mexico women's national ice hockey team became the first Mexican-born player selected in the history of the CWHL Draft. Other international players selected in the draft include France's Marion Allemoz and Japan's Nachi Fujimoto, both selected by the Canadiennes de Montreal. Sato Kikuchi from Japan's Nippon Sports Science University would be claimed by Boston in the eighth round.

Of note, a pair of players who competed with the Buffalo Beauts during the 2015–16 NWHL season were selected in the CWHL Draft. With their seventh-round pick, the Toronto Furies selected Erin Zach while goaltender Amanda Makela was selected by the Canadiennes in the eighth round.

== Notable entries in the draft ==
Notable entries in the draft include

- Renata Fast
- Erin Ambrose
- Emerance Maschmeyer

== Top 25 picks ==
#	Player	Position	Team	College
1	Kayla Tutino	Forward	Boston Blades	Boston University Terriers
2	Renata Fast	Forward	Toronto Furies	Clarkson Golden Knights
3	Laura Stacey	Forward	Brampton Thunder	Dartmouth Big Green
4	Sarah Lefort	Forward	Canadiennes de Montreal	Boston University Terriers
5	Emerance Maschmeyer	Goaltenders	Calgary Inferno	Harvard Crimson
6	Chelsey Goldberg	Forward	Boston	Northeastern Huskies
7	Erin Ambrose	Defense	Toronto	Clarkson Golden Knights
8	Shannon MacAulay	Forward	Brampton	Clarkson Golden Knights
9	Cassandra Poudrier	Defense	Montreal	Cornell Big Red
10	Katelyn Gosling	Defense	Calgary	Western Mustangs
11	Cassandra Opela	Defense	Boston	Connecticut Huskies
12	Michela Cava	Defense	Toronto	Minnesota Duluth Bulldogs
13	Nicole Brown	Forward	Brampton	Quinnipiac Bobcats
14	Ariane Barker	Forward	Montreal	Montreal Carabins
15	Iya Gavrilova	Defense	Calgary	Calgary Dinos
16	Meghan Grieves	Forward	Boston	Boston College Eagles
17	Jaimie McDonnell		Brampton (acquired from Furies)	Princeton Tigers
18	Kaitlyn Tougas	Forward	Brampton	Bemidji State Beavers
19	Brittney Fouracres	Defense	Montreal	McGill Martlets
20	Misty Seastrom	Defense	Calgary	
21	Dakota Woodworth	Forward	Boston	Boston University Terriers
22	Jenna Dingeldein	Forward	Toronto	Mercyhurst Lakers
23	Taylor Woods	Forward	Brampton	Cornell Big Red
24	Marion Allemoz	Forward	Montreal	Montreal Carabins
25	Akane Hosoyamada	Defense	Calgary	Syracuse Orange

== Picks by team ==
= Indicates Olympian

= Indicates former NCAA player

= Indicates former CIS player

=== Boston ===
Round	#	Player	Position	College
1	1	Kayla Tutino	Forward	Boston University Terriers
2	6	Chelsey Goldberg	Forward	Northeastern Huskies
3	11	Cassandra Opela	Defense	University of Connecticut
4	16	Meghan Grieves	Forward	Boston College
5	21	Dakota Woodworth	Forward	Boston University
6	26	Margaret Zimmer	Forward	Connecticut
7	31	Alexis Woloschuk	Defense	Boston University
8	36	Sato Kikuchi	Defense	Nippon Sports Science University
9	41	Taylor McGee	Defense	Penn State
10	46	Melissa Bizzari	Forward	Boston College
11	50	Kate Leary	Forward	Boston College
12	54	Lauren Dahm	Goaltender	Clarkson
13	57	Amanda Fontaine	Goaltender	Sacred Heart
14	60	Megan Fitzgerald	Forward	Hamilton College
15	63	Alexandra Karlis	Center	UMass Boston
16	65	Jennifer Currie	Forward	UMass Boston

=== Brampton ===
Round	#	Player	Position	College
1	3	Laura Stacey	Forward	Dartmouth Big Green women's ice hockey
2	8	Shannon MacAulay	Forward	Clarkson Golden Knights women's ice hockey
3	13	Nicole Brown	Forward	Quinnipiac Bobcats women's ice hockey
4	17	Jaimie McDonnell (acquired from Furies)		Princeton Tigers women's ice hockey
4	18	Kaitlyn Tougas	Forward	Bemidji State Beavers women's ice hockey
5	23	Taylor Woods	Forward	Cornell Big Red women's ice hockey
6	28	Kristen Barbara	Defense	York Lions women's ice hockey
7	33	Brittany Clapham	Defense	Western Mustangs
8	38	Jessica Hartwick	Forward	Ryerson Rams women's ice hockey
9	43	Melissa Wronzberg	Defense	Ryerson Rams
10	48	Emily Grainger	Defense	UBC Thunderbirds women's ice hockey
11	52	Jetta Rackleff	Goaltender	RIT Tigers
12	56	Jessa McAuliffe	Defense	York Lions
13	59	Nicki Robinson	Forward	Saskatchewan Huskies women's ice hockey
14	62	Kelly Campbell	Goaltender	Western Mustangs

=== Calgary ===
Round	#	Player	Position	College
1	5	Emerance Maschmeyer		
2	10	Katelyn Gosling		
3	15	Iya Gavrilova		
4	20	Misty Seastrom		
5	25	Akane Hosoyamada		
6	30	Cara Schlitz	Defense	
7	35	Caitlin Zevola	Forward	Spruce Grove Saints
8	40	Claudia Tellez		Mexico national women's ice hockey team
9	45	Debbie Beaudoin	Forward	
10	49	Rina Takeda	Defense	

=== Montreal ===
Round	#	Player	Position	College
1	4	Sarah Lefort	Forward	Boston University Terriers
2	9	Cassandra Poudrier	Defense	Cornell Big Red
3	14	Ariane Barker	Forward	Montreal Carabins
4	19	Brittney Fouracres	Defense	McGill Martlets
5	24	Marion Allemoz	Forward	Montreal Carabins
6	29	Taylor Hough	Goaltender	McGill Martlets
7	34	Melanie Desrochers	Defense	St. Lawrence Skating Saints
8	39	Amanda Makela	Goaltender	Buffalo Beauts
9	44	Nachi Fujimoto	Defense	Sapporo International

=== Toronto ===
Round	#	Player	Position	College
1	2	Renata Fast	Forward	Clarkson Golden Knights
2	7	Erin Ambrose	Defense	Clarkson Golden Knights
3	12	Michela Cava	Defense	Minnesota-Duluth Bulldogs
5	22	Jenna Dingeldein	Forward	Mercyhurst Lakers
6	27	Danielle Gagne	Forward	Ohio State Buckeyes
7	32	Erin Zach	Forward	RIT Tigers/Buffalo Beauts
8	37	Vanessa Spataro	Forward	St. Cloud State
9	42	Ella Stewart	Defense	Elmira College
10	47	Victoria MacKenzie	Forward	Ontario Institute of Technology
11	51	Carlee Eusepi	Defense	Clarkson Golden Knights
12	55	Jaclyn Gibson	Forward	Ontario Institute of Technology
13	58	Nicole Kirchberger	Forward	Buffalo State College
14	61	Jessica Platt	Defense	

== See also ==
- 2010 CWHL Draft
- 2011 CWHL Draft
- 2012 CWHL Draft
- 2013 CWHL Draft
- 2014 CWHL Draft
- 2015 CWHL Draft
