= Courtney Turner =

American ice hockey player

- Born: June 17, 1994 (age 31) Milton, Massachusetts, United States
- Height: 5 ft 3 in (160 cm)
- Position: Forward
- Shoots: Right
- CWHL team Former teams: Worcester Blades; Union Dutchwomen
- Playing career: 2017–present

Courtney Turner (born June 17, 1994) is a women's ice hockey player. She played college ice hockey at Union College and amassed 28 career points while with the program. She was selected first overall in the 2017 CWHL Draft by the Boston Blades, the second straight year that the club held the first pick in the draft.

== Playing career ==
=== CWHL ===
Turner was drafted first overall in the 2017 CWHL Draft by the Boston Blades.

Turner appeared in 28 games during her inaugural season with the Boston Blades. She debuted on October 14, 2018, on the road versus Les Canadiennes de Montreal. Turner recorded her first career point the following day in the third period of a 5–3 loss against Montreal with an assist on a goal scored by Chelsey Goldberg. On November 25, 2017, Turner scored the first goal of her CWHL career against the Calgary Inferno in a road series at the 18:43 mark of the first period. During the third period, Turner scored her second goal of the game in a 5–2 loss and was recognized as one of the Three Stars of the Game. Turner is now a coach for the Harborwomen of Hingham High School in Hingham, Massachusetts.

== Career stats ==
Season	Team	League	GP	G	A	Pts	PIM	PPG
2012–13	Union Dutchwomen	ECAC	34	6	8	14	14	4
2013–14	Union Dutchwomen	ECAC	33	5	7	12	18	3
2014–15	Union Dutchwomen	ECAC	0	0	0	0	0	0
2015–16	Union Dutchwomen	ECAC	16	0	2	2	4	0
2017–18	Boston Blades	CWHL	28	3	3	6	14	0

Awards and achievements
Preceded by Kayla Tutino	CWHL first overall draft pick 2017	Succeeded by Lauren Williams
