= 2014–15 Brown Bears women's ice hockey season =

Winner of Mayor's Cup November 28, 2014
- Conference: 12th ECAC
- Home ice: Meehan Auditorium

Record
- Overall: 5–23–1
- Home: 5–10–1
- Road: 0–13–0

Coaches and captains
- Head coach: Amy Borbeau
- Assistant coaches: Jillian Kirchner; Lindsay Berman
- Captain: Lauren Vella
- Alternate captain(s): Kaitlyn Keon; Alli Rolandelli

The Brown Bears represented Brown University in ECAC women's ice hockey during the 2014–15 NCAA Division I women's ice hockey season.

== Offseason ==
- July 15: Seventeen players honoroed with placement on ECAC All-Academic Team.

== Recruiting ==
Player	Position	Nationality	Notes
Caroline Buckholtz	Defense	United States	Attended Choate-Rosemary Hall
Rachael Cholak	Forward	United States	Played with Chicago Young Americans
Sam Donovan	Forward	United States	Played with the Elite Black (Minn.)
Cynthia Kyin	Defense	United States	Blueliner for Chicago Mission
Julianne Landry	Goaltender	United States	Goalie for Assabet Valley
Kaitlyn Swanstrom	Forward	United States	Played with the Minnesota Jr, Whitecaps
Samantha Swanstrom	Forward	United States	Attended Blaine (MN) HS
Dara Wais	Forward	United States	Played for Washington Pride

== Roster ==
No.	Nat.	Player	Class	Pos	Height	DoB	Hometown	Previous team
2		Alli Rolandelli (A)	Junior	D	5' 3" (1.6 m)		Minnetonka, Minnesota	Minnesota Jr. Whitecaps
4		Lauren Vella (C)	Senior	D	5' 7" (1.7 m)		Staten Island, New York	New Jersey Colonials
5		Hunter Davis	Junior	D	5' 8" (1.73 m)		Clifton Park, New York	Connecticut Polar Bears
6		Kelly Micholson	Junior	D	5' 7" (1.7 m)		Elk Grove Village, Illinois	Chicago Mission
7		Erin Conway	Sophomore	F	5' 2" (1.57 m)		Jackson, Michigan	Choate-Rosemary Hall
8		Ariana Rucker	Junior	F	5' 9" (1.75 m)		Oakton, Virginia	Oakton HS
10		Sarah Robson	Senior	F	5' 5" (1.65 m)		Mississauga, Ontario	Lorne Park
11		Samantha Swanstrom	Freshman	F	5' 4" (1.63 m)		Ham Lake, Minnesota	Blaine HS
12		Monica Masucci	Junior	F	5' 6" (1.68 m)		Toronto, Ontario	Mississauga Jr. Chiefs
14		Kaitlyn Keon (A)	Senior	F	5' 8" (1.73 m)		Toronto, Ontario	Etobicoke Jr. Dolphins
15		Maddie Woo	Sophomore	F	5' 7" (1.7 m)		Plymouth, Minnesota	Maple Grove HS
16		Katie Swanstrom	Freshman	F	5' 4" (1.63 m)		Ham Lake, Minnesota	Minnesota Jr. Whitecaps
17		Janice Yang	Senior	F	5' 4" (1.63 m)		Westport, Connecticut	Choate-Rosemary Hall
19		Cynthia Kyin	Freshman	D	5' 6" (1.68 m)		Skokie, Illinois	Chicago Mission
21		Caroline Buckholtz	Freshman	D	5' 4" (1.63 m)		Greenlawn, New York	Choate-Rosemary Hall
22		Rachael Cholak	Freshman	F	5' 5" (1.65 m)		Kenosha, Wisconsin	Chicago Young Americans
24		Brittany Moorehead	Senior	F	5' 6" (1.68 m)		Clinton, New York	National Sports Academy
25		Dara Wais	Freshman	F	5' 6" (1.68 m)		Baltimore, Maryland	Washington Pride
27		Catherine LeBouef	Sophomore	D	5' 6" (1.68 m)		Dieppe, New Brunswick	Brewster Academy
30		Julianne Landry	Freshman	G	5' 7" (1.7 m)		Hanover, Massachusetts	Assabet Valley
32		Sam Donovan	Freshman	F	5' 2" (1.57 m)		New Brighton, Minnesota	Elite Black
33		Monica Elvin	Sophomore	G	5' 6" (1.68 m)		Oakland, California	Alaska All-Stars

== Schedule ==
Date	Opponent^{#}	Rank^{#}	Site	Decision	Result	Record
Regular Season
October 24	RIT*		Meehan Auditorium • Providence, RI	Monica Elvin	L 1–4	0–1–0
October 25	RIT*		Meehan Auditorium • Providence, RI	Julianne Landry	L 2–5	0–2–0
October 31	#9 Clarkson		Meehan Auditorium • Providence, RI	Julianne Landry	L 1–5	0–3–0 (0–1–0)
November 1	St. Lawrence		Meehan Auditorium • Providence, RI	Monica Elvin	W 7–4	1–3–0 (1–1–0)
November 4	at Connecticut*		Freitas Ice Forum • Storrs, CT	Monica Elvin	L 2–4	1–4–0
November 7	Maine*		Meehan Auditorium • Providence, RI	Monica Elvin	W 5–2	2–4–0
November 8	Maine*		Meehan Auditorium • Providence, RI	Monica Elvin	W 5–3	3–4–0
November 14	at Cornell		Lynah Rink • Ithaca, NY	Monica Elvin	L 1–5	3–5–0 (1–2–0)
November 15	at Colgate		Starr Rink • Hamilton, NY	Monica Elvin	L 3–4 ^{OT}	3–6–0 (1–3–0)
November 28	Providence*		Meehan Auditorium • Providence, RI (Mayor's Cup)	Monica Elvin	W 2–1	4–6–0
November 29	at Providence*		Schneider Arena • Providence, RI	Julianne Landry	L 2–4	4–7–0
December 5	at Rensselaer		Houston Field House • Troy, NY	Julianne Landry	L 5–7	4–8–0 (1–4–0)
December 6	at Union		Achilles Center • Schenectady, NY	Monica Elvin	L 2–3	4–9–0 (1–5–0)
January 2, 2015	#6 Harvard		Meehan Auditorium • Providence, RI	Monica Elvin	L 0–6	4–10–0 (1–6–0)
January 3	Dartmouth		Meehan Auditorium • Providence, RI	Julianne Landry	L 1–5	4–11–0 (1–7–0)
January 9	at #5 Quinnipiac		TD Bank Sports Center • Hamden, CT	Monica Elvin	L 0–3	4–12–0 (1–8–0)
January 10	at Princeton		Hobey Baker Memorial Rink • Princeton, NJ	Monica Elvin	L 1–5	4–13–0 (1–9–0)
January 16	Colgate		Meehan Auditorium • Providence, RI	Monica Elvin	L 0–3	4–14–0 (1–10–0)
January 17	Cornell		Meehan Auditorium • Providence, RI	Monica Elvin	L 2–4	4–15–0 (1–11–0)
January 23	Yale		Meehan Auditorium • Providence, RI	Monica Elvin	W 3–2 ^{OT}	5–15–0 (2–11–0)
January 24	at Yale		Ingalls Rink • New Haven, CT	Monica Elvin	L 3–6	5–16–0 (2–12–0)
January 30	at St. Lawrence		Appleton Arena • Canton, NY	Julianne Landry	L 0–4	5–17–0 (2–13–0)
January 31	at #8 Clarkson		Cheel Arena • Potsdam, NY	Monica Elvin	L 0–6	5–18–0 (2–14–0)
February 6	at Dartmouth		Thompson Arena • Hanover, NH	Monica Elvin	L 3–5	5–19–0 (2–15–0)
February 7	at #4 Harvard		Bright-Landry Hockey Center • Allston, MA	Julianne Landry	L 1–7	5–20–0 (2–16–0)
February 13	Union		Meehan Auditorium • Providence, RI	Monica Elvin	T 3–3 ^{OT}	5–20–1 (2–16–1)
February 14	Rensselaer		Meehan Auditorium • Providence, RI	Monica Elvin	L 2–3	5–21–1 (2–17–1)
February 20	Princeton		Meehan Auditorium • Providence, RI	Monica Elvin	L 1–4	5–22–1 (2–18–1)
February 21	Quinnipiac		Meehan Auditorium • Providence, RI	Monica Elvin	L 0–1	5–23–1 (2–19–1)
*Non-conference game. ^{#}Rankings from USCHO.com Poll.
