= Alexis Woloschuk =

Canadian ice hockey player

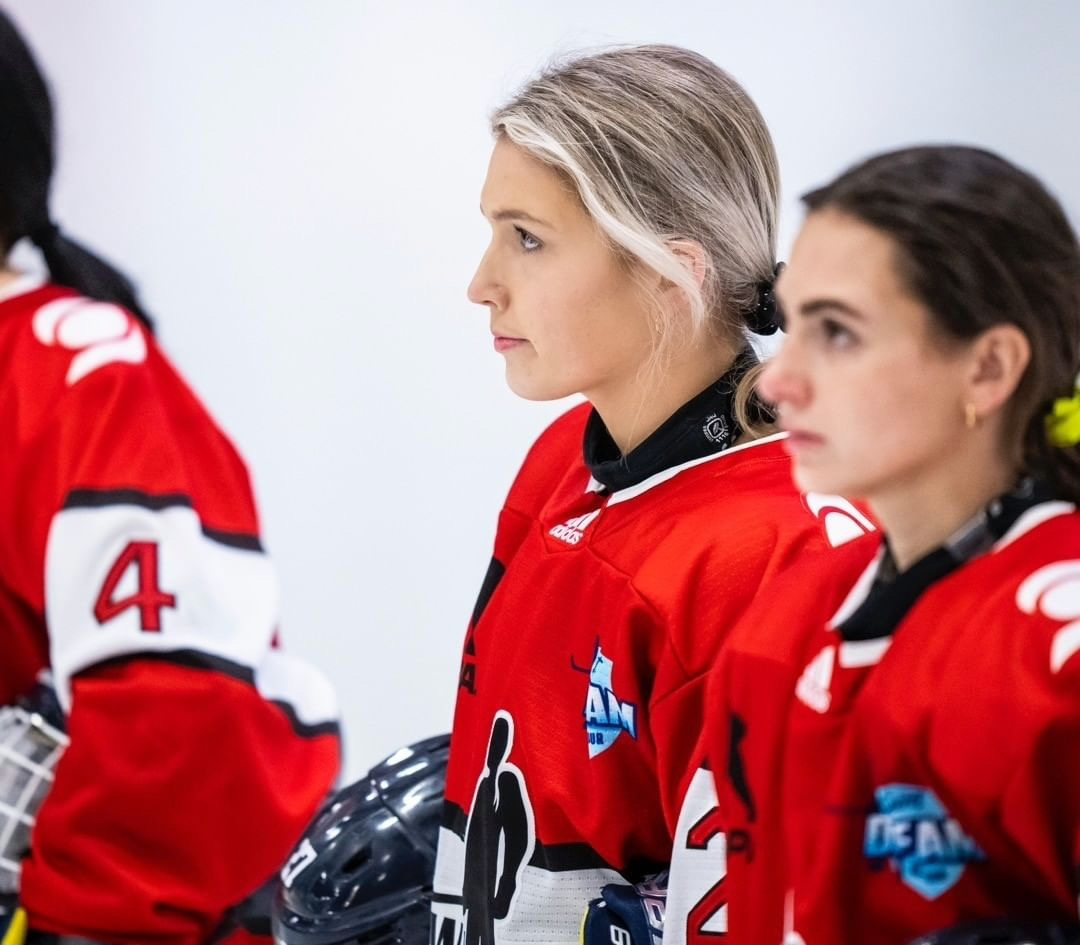
- Woloschuk with the PWHPA in 2021
- Born: April 6, 1994 (age 32) Winnipeg, Manitoba, Canada
- Height: 5 ft 7 in (170 cm)
- Position: Defence
- Shoots: Left
- PHF team Former teams: Toronto Six: PWHPA Team Sonnet; PWHPA Team Scotiabank; Markham Thunder; HV71; Boston University Terriers
- Playing career: 2012–present

Alexis Woloschuk (born April 6, 1994) is a Canadian professional ice hockey player. She most recently played in the now defunct Premier Hockey Federation (PHF) with the Toronto Six. She has previously played with Team Sonnet and Team Scotiabank of the Professional Women's Hockey Players Association (PWHPA), the Markham Thunder of the Canadian Women's Hockey League (CWHL), and HV71 Dam of the Swedish Women's Hockey League (SDHL).

== Playing career ==
=== NCAA ===
Woloschuk played four years of college ice hockey with the Boston University Terriers women's ice hockey program in the Hockey East (WHEA) conference of the NCAA Division I. A traditional stay-at-home defenceman, she amassed a modest scoring tally of 24 points (1 goal+23 assists) across 114 games with the Terriers. However, thirteen of her 23 assists were earned in her senior campaign, her most prominent performance, and she ended the season with a sublime +9 plus–minus. The year was capped by Woloschuk being named to the Hockey East All-Academic Team for the second time.

=== SDHL ===
Following her graduation in 2016, Woloschuk signed her first professional ice hockey contract to play overseas in Sweden with HV71 of the Swedish Women's Hockey League (SDHL). When the signing was announced, head coach of HV71, Ulf Johansson, assessed her as "stable, strong, and reliable defender with a good shot."

=== CWHL ===
Woloschuk returned to Canada after the 2016–17 SDHL season to play professionally in the Canadian Women's Hockey League (CWHL). Originally drafted 31st overall by the Boston Blades at the 2016 CWHL Draft, she returned to North America as a free agent and was acquired by the Markham Thunder ahead of the 2017–18 CWHL season. Her defensive partner with HV71, Lindsay Grigg, also signed with Markham and it was speculated that Woloschuk's solid defensive skills and Grigg's rover style of play would be welcome additions to the Markham Thunder's blue line.

Wolochuk won the 2018 Clarkson Cup with the Markham Thunder after a hard-fought battle against the Kunlun Red Star WIH at the Ricoh Coliseum in Toronto, Ontario on March 25, 2018.

=== PWHPA ===
In 2019, Woloschuk made her PWHPA debut while playing in several Dream Gap Tour showcases in the 2019–20 PWHPA season, including the Unifor Showcase and Secret Deodorant Showcase. Following a successful 2019–20 season, Woloschuk earned a roster spot on Team Sonnet based in Toronto and, following the COVID-19 pandemic stoppage, played in the PWHPA's first showcase of the 2020–21 PWHPA Dream Gap Tour, hosted by the Calgary Flames in Calgary Alberta, with Team Scotiabank, the representative team of the Calgary-based PWHPA section.

== Personal life ==
Woloschuk graduated from Boston University in 2016 with a BSc. in health sciences.
