= 2014–15 Clarkson Golden Knights women's ice hockey season =

Defending champions dominate conference but fall short

ECAC Hockey Regular Season Co-Champions NCAA Quarterfinals, L 1–5 vs. Boston College
- Conference: T–1st ECAC
- Home ice: Cheel Arena

Rankings
- USCHO.com: #7
- USA Today/USA Hockey Magazine: #7

Record
- Overall: 24–11–3
- Home: 11–6–1
- Road: 13–4–2
- Neutral: 0–1–0

Coaches and captains
- Head coach: Matt Desrosiers
- Assistant coaches: Britni Smith; Meghan Duggan
- Captain: Shannon MacAulay
- Alternate captain(s): Erin Ambrose; Renata Fast; Olivia Howe

The Clarkson Golden Knights women's ice hockey program represented Clarkson University during the 2014–15 NCAA Division I women's ice hockey season. The Golden Knights entered the season as the defending ECAC regular season and national champions.

The Golden Knights successfully defended a share of their conference regular season championship with a win over co-champion Harvard on the last day of the season. They were then defeated in the ECAC semifinals by Cornell. Despite this, they still earned their third straight at-large bid to the NCAA tournament, where they were defeated in the quarterfinals by Boston College.

== Offseason ==
=== Coaching changes ===
Both co-head coach Shannon Desrosiers and assistant coach Matt Kelly departed in the offseason, leaving Shannon's husband Matt Desrosiers as sole head coach and as the only coach on the staff. To replace the departed coaches, Britni Smith, a former standout at St. Lawrence, and Meghan Duggan, a former standout at Wisconsin and a member of the United States national team, were hired as assistant coaches.

=== Recruiting ===
Player	Position	Nationality	Notes
Brielle Bellerive	Forward	Canada	Winner of gold medal at 2014 IIHF U18 Women’s Worlds
Katelyn Fournier	Forward	Canada	Competed with Ottawa Lady Senators (PWHL)
Savannah Harmon	Defense	United States	Played for the Boston Shamrocks (JWHL); 2014 JWHL First Team All-Star
Lauren Lefler	Forward	Canada	Played for the Bluewater Junior Hawks (PWHL); Member of 2013 U18 Team Ontario Blue
Shea Tiley	Goaltender	Canada	Winner of gold medal at 2014 IIHF U18 Women’s Worlds; Member of 2013 U18 Team Ontario Blue
Amanda Titus	Forward	Canada	Competed with Ottawa Lady Senators (PWHL)

== Roster ==
No.	Nat.	Player	Class	Pos	Height	DoB	Hometown	Previous team
2		Corie Jacobson	Sophomore	F	5' 6" (1.68 m)	1995-05-28	Warren, Ontario	Northbay Ice Boltz
4		Shannon MacAulay (C)	Junior	F	5' 11" (1.8 m)	1994-06-22	Mount Herbert, Prince Edward Island	Warner Warriors
6		Jennifer Shields	Senior	D	5' 5" (1.65 m)	1993-02-20	Ingersoll, Ontario	Bluewater Jr. Hawks
7		Jessica Gillham	Sophomore	F	5' 7" (1.7 m)	1995-03-15	Uxbridge, Ontario	Aurora Panthers
8		Lauren Lefler	Freshman	F	5' 8" (1.73 m)	1996-06-26	Windsor, Ontario	Bluewater Jr. Hawks
9		Genevieve Bannon	Sophomore	F	5' 8" (1.73 m)	1995-02-03	Candiac, Quebec	Ontario Hockey Academy
12		Renata Fast (A)	Junior	D	5' 7" (1.7 m)	1994-10-06	Burlington, Ontario	Burlington Jr. Barracudas
14		Savannah Harmon	Freshman	D	5' 3" (1.6 m)	1995-10-27	Downers Grove, Illinois	Boston Shamrocks
15		Amanda Titus	Freshman	F	5' 6" (1.68 m)	1996-10-06	Stittsville, Ontario	Ottawa Jr. Senators
16		Olivia Howe (A)	Junior	F	5' 10" (1.78 m)	1994-01-17	Moose Jaw, Saskatchewan	Notre Dame Hounds
17		Daniella Matteucci	Senior	D	5' 7" (1.7 m)	1993-02-08	Fruitvale, British Columbia	Notre Dame Hounds
18		Cayley Mercer	Junior	F	5' 8" (1.73 m)	1994-01-18	Exeter, Ontario	Bluewater Jr. Hawks
22		Christine Lambert	Senior	F	5' 8" (1.73 m)	1992-11-22	Thetford Mines, Quebec	Ontario Hockey Academy
23		Erin Ambrose (A)	Junior	D	5' 5" (1.65 m)	1994-04-30	Keswick, Ontario	Toronto Jr. Aeros
24		Katelyn Fournier	Freshman	F	5' 7" (1.7 m)	1996-03-25	Ottawa, Ontario	Ottawa Jr. Senators
27		Brielle Bellerive	Freshman	F	5' 9" (1.75 m)	1996-12-01	North Vancouver, British Columbia	Okanagan Hockey Academy
29		Emily Horn	Senior	G	5' 6" (1.68 m)	1993-02-08	Hamilton, Ontario	Brampton Jr. Thunder
32		Jenna Boss	Senior	G	5' 5" (1.65 m)	1992-09-24	Little Canada, Minnesota	Roseville Raiders
33		Mckenzie Johnson	Sophomore	G	5' 7" (1.7 m)	1995-06-01	Eden Prairie, Minnesota	Eden Prairie H.S.
35		Shea Tiley	Freshman	G	5' 10" (1.78 m)	1996-12-02	Owen Sound, Ontario	Kitchener-Waterloo Rangers

== Schedule ==
Date	Opponent^{#}	Rank^{#}	Site	Decision	Result	Record
Regular Season
October 3	at St. Lawrence*	#7	Appleton Arena • Canton, NY	Shea Tiley	L 3–5	0–1–0
October 4	St. Lawrence*	#7	Cheel Arena • Potsdam, NY	Shea Tiley	W 2–1	1–1–0
October 11	at Providence*	#9	Schneider Arena • Providence, RI	Shea Tiley	W 5–0	2–1–0
October 12	at Providence*	#9	Schneider Arena • Providence, RI	Shea Tiley	W 3–0	3–1–0
October 17	#6 Boston University*	#7	Cheel Arena • Potsdam, NY	Shea Tiley	L 1–3	3–2–0
October 18	#6 Boston University*	#7	Cheel Arena • Potsdam, NY	Shea Tiley	L 2–5	3–3–0
October 24	Syracuse*	#10	Cheel Arena • Potsdam, NY	Shea Tiley	W 9–0	4–3–0
October 25	at Syracuse*	#10	Tennity Ice Skating Pavilion • Syracuse, NY	Shea Tiley	W 4–1	5–3–0
October 28	St. Lawrence	#9	Cheel Arena • Potsdam, NY	Shea Tiley	W 5–0	6–3–0 (1–0–0)
October 31	at Brown	#9	Meehan Auditorium • Providence, RI	Shea Tiley	W 5–1	7–3–0 (2–0–0)
November 1	at Yale	#9	Ingalls Rink • New Haven, CT	Shea Tiley	W 2–1	8–3–0 (3–0–0)
November 14	#4 Harvard	#7	Cheel Arena • Potsdam, NY	Shea Tiley	T 2–2 ^{OT}	8–3–1 (3–0–1)
November 15	#10 Dartmouth	#7	Cheel Arena • Potsdam, NY	Shea Tiley	W 3–0	9–3–1 (4–0–1)
November 21	at #4 Quinnipiac	#5	TD Bank Sports Center • Hamden, CT	Shea Tiley	L 0–1	9–4–1 (4–1–1)
November 22	at Princeton	#5	Hobey Baker Memorial Rink • Princeton, NJ	Shea Tiley	W 3–2	10–4–1 (5–1–1)
November 28	at Connecticut*	#5	Mark Edward Freitas Ice Forum • Storrs, CT (Nutmeg Classic Semifinals)	Shea Tiley	W 2–1 ^{OT}	11–4–1
November 29	vs. #4 Quinnipiac*	#5	Mark Edward Freitas Ice Forum • Storrs, CT (Nutmeg Classic Championship)	Shea Tiley	L 1–3	11–5–1
December 5	Cornell	#6	Cheel Arena • Potsdam, NY	Shea Tiley	L 3–8	11–6–1 (5–2–1)
December 6	Colgate	#6	Cheel Arena • Potsdam, NY	Shea Tiley	W 5–1	12–6–1 (6–2–1)
January 3	McGill*	#8	Cheel Arena • Potsdam, NY (exhibition)	McKenzie Johnson	W 5–0	12–6–1
January 9	at Colgate	#8	Starr Arena • Hamilton, NY	Shea Tiley	W 3–1	13–6–1 (7–2–1)
January 10	at #10 Cornell	#8	Lynah Rink • Ithaca, NY	Shea Tiley	T 1–1 ^{OT}	13–6–2 (7–2–2)
January 16	Union	#8	Cheel Arena • Potsdam, NY	Shea Tiley	W 4–0	14–6–2 (8–2–2)
January 17	RPI	#8	Cheel Arena • Potsdam, NY	Shea Tiley	W 4–2	15–6–2 (9–2–2)
January 24	at #4 Wisconsin*	#7	LaBahn Arena • Madison, WI	Shea Tiley	T 1–1 ^{OT}	15–6–3
January 25	at #4 Wisconsin*	#7	LaBahn Arena • Madison, WI	Shea Tiley	L 0–4	15–7–3
January 30	Yale	#8	Cheel Arena • Potsdam, NY	Shea Tiley	L 2–3	15–8–3 (9–3–2)
January 31	Brown	#8	Cheel Arena • Potsdam, NY	Shea Tiley	W 6–0	16–8–3 (10–3–2)
February 3	at #8 St. Lawrence	#10	Appleton Arena • Canton, NY	Shea Tiley	W 3–1	17–8–3 (11–3–2)
February 6	at RPI	#10	Houston Field House • Troy, NY	Shea Tiley	W 2–1	18–8–3 (12–3–2)
February 7	at Union	#10	Achilles Rink • Schenectady, NY	Shea Tiley	W 6–0	19–8–3 (13–3–2)
February 13	Princeton	#8	Cheel Arena • Potsdam, NY	Shea Tiley	W 2–1	20–8–3 (14–3–2)
February 14	#5 Quinnipiac	#8	Cheel Arena • Potsdam, NY	Shea Tiley	L 0–1	20–9–3 (14–4–2)
February 20	at Dartmouth	#7	Thompson Arena • Hanover, NH	Shea Tiley	W 2–1 ^{OT}	21–9–3 (15–4–2)
February 21	at #3 Harvard	#7	Bright-Landry Hockey Center • Allston, MA	Shea Tiley	W 1–0	22–9–3 (16–4–2)
ECAC Hockey Tournament
February 27	Dartmouth*	#5	Cheel Arena • Potsdam, NY (Quarterfinals Game 1)	Shea Tiley	W 6–0	23–9–3
February 28	Dartmouth*	#5	Cheel Arena • Potsdam, NY (Quarterfinals Game 2)	Shea Tiley	W 4–1	24–9–3
March 7	#9 Cornell*	#5	Cheel Arena • Potsdam, NY (Semifinals)	Shea Tiley	L 1–3	24–10–3
NCAA Tournament
March 14	at #1 Boston College*	#7	Conte Forum • Chestnut Hill, MA (Quarterfinals)	Shea Tiley	L 1–5	24–11–3
*Non-conference game. ^{#}Rankings from USCHO.com Poll.

== Awards and honors ==
- Erin Ambrose – Patty Kazmaier Award nominee, ECAC Hockey Third Team All-Star, ECAC Hockey weekly Honor Roll (10/5, 1/13), Nutmeg Classic All-Tournament Team, ECAC Hockey Preseason All-League Team
- Genevieve Bannon – ECAC Hockey Player of the Week (10/26), ECAC Hockey weekly Honor Roll (2/22)
- Brielle Bellerive – ECAC Hockey Rookie of the Week (12/10), ECAC Hockey weekly Honor Roll (2/22)
- Renata Fast – ECAC Hockey First Team All-Star
- Savannah Harmon – USCHO.com All-Rookie Team, ECAC Hockey All-Rookie Team, ECAC Hockey Rookie of the Week (10/26, 11/2), ECAC Hockey weekly Honor Roll (1/20, 2/15)
- Olivia Howe – ECAC Hockey weekly Honor Roll (3/1)
- Christine Lambert – ECAC Hockey weekly Honor Roll (2/1)
- Shannon MacAulay – Patty Kazmaier Award nominee, ECAC Hockey Third Team All-Star, ECAC Hockey Player of the Month (October), ECAC Hockey weekly Honor Roll (10/5, 11/18, 12/2), Nutmeg Classic All-Tournament Team (11/29)
- Cayley Mercer – Patty Kazmaier Award nominee, ECAC Hockey First Team All-Star, ECAC Hockey Player of the Week (10/12, 12/10), ECAC Hockey weekly Honor Roll (1/20, 2/9, 2/15)
- Shea Tiley – USCHO.com All-Rookie Team, ECAC Hockey Goaltender of the Year, ECAC Hockey Rookie of the Year, ECAC Hockey Player of the Year finalist, ECAC Hockey First Team All-Star, ECAC Hockey All-Rookie Team, ECAC Hockey Rookie of the Month (October, December, February), ECAC Hockey Goaltender of the Month (February), ECAC Hockey Goaltender of the Week (10/12, 11/2, 11/18), 2/9, ECAC Hockey Rookie of the Week (1/27), ECAC Hockey weekly Honor Roll (10/5, 10/26, 11/25, 12/2, 1/13, 1/20, 2/1, 2/15, 2/22, 3/1)
- Amanda Titus – ECAC Hockey weekly Honor Roll (11/25, 3/1)
- Matt Desrosiers – ECAC Hockey Coach of the Year
