= Kristen Barbara =

Canadian ice hockey player

- Born: October 30, 1992 (age 33) Hamilton, Ontario, Canada
- Height: 5 ft 8 in (173 cm)
- Weight: 140 lb (64 kg; 10 st 0 lb)
- Position: Defense
- Shot: Right
- PHF team: Metropolitan Riveters
- Played for: PWHPA; Markham Thunder; York Lions
- National team: Canada
- Playing career: 2011–2022

Kristen Barbara (born October 30, 1992) is a Canadian ice hockey defenceman, last played for the Metropolitan Riveters in the Premier Hockey Federation (PHF).

== Playing career ==
Across five years with the York Lions women's ice hockey program, Barbara played 120 games, putting up 71 points. In 2012, she was named to the CIS All-Rookie Team, and would be recognised with CIS All-Canadian honours in 2015. She was captain of the team in her final season.

Barbara was drafted 28th overall by the Brampton Thunder in the 2016 CWHL Draft. Across three Canadian Women's Hockey League (CWHL) seasons with the Thunder franchise, Barbara played 58 games, putting up 19 points. In 2018, she was a member of the Clarkson Cup-winning Markham Thunder team.

After spending the 2019–20 season with the PWHPA as an independent member, Barbara was announced as one of the first five players to sign with the Toronto Six, the first NWHL expansion team in Canada.

== Personal life ==
Outside of hockey, Barbara is training to be a firefighter. She has a degree in sociology from York University.

== Career statistics ==
			Regular season					Playoffs
Season	Team	League	GP	G	A	Pts	PIM	GP	G	A	Pts	PIM
2016–17	Brampton Thunder	CWHL	2	0	0	0	0	–	–	–	–	–
2017–18	Markham Thunder	CWHL	28	4	8	12	28	3	0	0	0	0
2018–19	Markham Thunder	CWHL	28	3	4	7	18	3	0	0	0	0
2019–20	Independent	PWHPA	–	–	–	–	–	–	–	–	–	–
2020–21	Toronto Six	NWHL	4	0	0	0	2	1	0	0	0	2
2021–22	Metropolitan Riveters	PHF	20	1	13	14	16	1	0	0	0	0
CWHL totals			58	7	12	19	46	6	0	0	0	0
NWHL/PHF totals			24	1	13	14	18	2	0	0	0	2

== Awards and honours ==
- 2011-2012 OUA All-Rookie Team & OUA Second Team All-Star
- 2011-2012 CIS All-Rookie Team
- 2011-2012 York Lions Athletics Female Rookie of the Year
- 2013-2014 OUA Second Team All-Star
- 2014-2015 OUA First Team All-Star
- 2014-2015 CIS First Team All-Star & All Canadian
- 2017-2018 Clarkson Cup Champion
