= 2014–15 UConn Huskies women's ice hockey season =

2014–15 Connecticut Huskies women's ice hockey season
- Conference: 5th WHEA

Record
- Overall: 11–18–8
- Home: 5–8–3
- Road: 6–9–5
- Neutral: 0–1–0

Coaches and captains
- Head coach: Chris MacKenzie
- Assistant coaches: Jaclyn Hawkins; Casey Handrahan
- Captain: Sarah MacDonnell
- Alternate captain(s): Leah Burress; Caitlin Hewes

The UConn Huskies women's ice hockey program represented the University of Connecticut Huskies during the 2014–15 NCAA Division I women's ice hockey season.

== Offseason ==
=== Recruiting ===
The 2014 recruiting class was notable, in that Shannon Godin filed a lawsuit, alleging that she was the victim of hazing, which led to her hospitalization, and that head coach Chris MacKenzie was both aware of the incident, and that he acted in an abusive manner. A subsequent inquiry by the university confirmed the hazing incident, but did not find MacKenzie at fault

Player	Position	Nationality	Notes
Madison Badeau	Forward	Canada	Attended Holy Trinity Catholic HS
Annie Belanger	Goaltender	Canada	Played for Team Quebec U18
Cyndee Cook	Defense	Canada	Played for Shaftesbury Prep
Justine Fredette	Forward	Canada	Cook's teammate with Shaftesbury Prep
Shannon Godin	Forward	Canada	Played for Brewster Academy
Theresa Knutson	Forward	United States	Played for Team Wisconsin U19
Leah Lum	Defense	Canada	Played for the Pacific Steelers
Lindsay Roethke	Forward	United States	Played for Buffalo (MN) HS
Marisa Maccario	Forward	United States	Played for the Boston Shamrocks

== Roster ==
Goaltending kept the Huskies competitive. Elaine Chuli remained one of Hockey East's best netminders, while Freshman Annie Belanger emerges as an equally talented backup. The duo allowed the Huskies to earn a respectable 2.95 Goals Against Average. The offensive efforts of the team did not match the defensive threat. The Huskies scored only 80 goals, with seniors Emily Snodgrass, Sarah MacDonnell and Kayla Campero scoring nearly half (37) of those goals. The team's best performance was the Quarterfinal winning game at Maine on February 28, 2015, when Elaine Chuli led the team though a regulation 0-0 tie, while Rebecca Fleming scored the game winning overtime goal.

=== 2014–15 Huskies ===
No.	Nat.	Player	Class	Pos	Height	DoB	Hometown	Previous team
1		Emily Walsh	Senior	G	5' 3" (1.6 m)		Burr Ridge, Illinois	Benet Academy
3		Theresa Knutson	Freshman	F	5' 6" (1.68 m)		Onalaska, Wisconsin	Team Wisconsin
4		Cyndee Cook	Freshman	D	5' 4" (1.63 m)		Winnipeg, Manitoba	Shaftesbury Prep
5		Lexi Lersch	Sophomore	D	5' 7" (1.7 m)		Manhattan Beach, California	Choate Rosemary Hall
7		Leah Lum	Freshman	D	5' 5" (1.65 m)		Richmond, British Columbia	Pacific Steelers
8		Rachel Farrel	Senior	F	5' 3" (1.6 m)		Cheshire, Connecticut	Westminster School
9		Jessica Stott	Sophomore	D	5' 6" (1.68 m)		Niverville, Manitoba	Shaftesbury Prep
10		Lindsay Roethke	Freshman	F	5' 1" (1.55 m)		Buffalo, Minnesota	Buffalo HS
11		Brittany Berisoff	Junior	F	5' 7" (1.7 m)		Kelowna, British Columbia	Notre Dame
12		Cassandra Opela	Junior	D	5' 8" (1.73 m)		Penfield, New York	Boston Shamrocks
13		Reese Maccario	Freshman	F	5' 3" (1.6 m)		Marblehead, Massachusetts	Boston Shamrocks
14		Justine Fredette	Freshman	F	5' 5" (1.65 m)		Winnipeg, Manitoba	Shaftesbury Prep
15		Shannon Godin	Freshman	F	5' 9" (1.75 m)		Pembroke, Ontario	Brewster Academy
16		Allie Hughes	Junior	D	5' 5" (1.65 m)		La Canada, California	Brewster Academy
17		Caitlin Hewes (A)	Junior (RS)	D	5' 7" (1.7 m)		Stillwater, Minnesota	Stillwater Area HS
18		Rebecca Fleming	Senior	F	5' 6" (1.68 m)		Newton, Massachusetts	Holy Cross
19		Margaret Zimmer	Junior	F	5' 7" (1.7 m)		St. Charles, Illinois	Chicago Mission
22		Kelly Harris	Sophomore	F	5' 7" (1.7 m)		Canton, Michigan	Little Caesar
26		Sarah MacDonnell (C)	Senior	F	5' 6" (1.68 m)		Quispamsis, New Brunswick	Team Canada U18
29		Elaine Chuli	Junior	G	5' 7" (1.7 m)		Waterton, Ontario	Team Canada U18
41		Annie Belanger	Freshman	G	5' 9" (1.75 m)		Sherbrooke, Quebec	Team Quebec U18
48		Kayla Campero	Senior	F	5' 10" (1.78 m)		Wallingford, Connecticut	Choate Rosemary Hall
62		Emily Snodgrass	Senior	F	5' 7" (1.7 m)		Eagan, Minnesota	Eastview HS
91		Madison Badeau	Freshman	F	6' 0" (1.83 m)		Courtice, Ontario	Jr. Wolves Intermediate
94		Leah Buress (A)	Junior	F	5' 4" (1.63 m)		Windsor, Ontario	Bluewater Intermediate

== Schedule ==
Date	Opponent^{#}	Rank^{#}	Site	Decision	Result	Record
Regular Season
September 26	#10 Minnesota Duluth*		Freitas Ice Forum • Storrs, CT	Elaine Chuli	T 4–4 ^{OT}	0–0–1
September 27	#10 Minnesota Duluth*		Freitas Ice Forum • Storrs, CT	Elaine Chuli	L 0–3	0–1–1
October 3	at #10 Quinnipiac*		TD Bank Sports Center • Hamden, CT	Elaine Chuli	L 0–3	0–2–1
October 10	at Union*		Achilles Center • Schenectady, NY	Elaine Chuli	W 4–2	1–2–1
October 11	at Union*		Achilles Center • Schenectady, NY	Annie Belanger	L 0–1	1–3–1
October 18	at Colgate*		Starr Rink • Hamilton, NY	Elaine Chuli	W 2–1	2–3–1
October 19	at Syracuse*		Tennity Ice Skating Pavilion • Syracuse, NY	Annie Belanger	T 2–2 ^{OT}	2–3–2
October 25	at Rensselaer*		Houston Field House • Troy, NY	Elaine Chuli	L 1–4	2–4–2
October 26	at Rensselaer*		Houston Field House • Troy, NY	Annie Belanger	T 2–2 ^{OT}	2–4–3
October 31	Maine		Freitas Ice Forum • Storrs, CT	Elaine Chuli	T 3–3 ^{OT}	2–4–4 (0–0–1)
November 2	at Vermont		Gutterson Field House • Burlington, VT	Elaine Chuli	L 0–6	2–5–4 (0–1–1)
November 4	Brown*		Freitas Ice Forum • Storrs, CT	Annie Belanger	W 4–2	3–5–4
November 9	at Providence		Schneider Arena • Providence, RI	Elaine Chuli	T 4–4 ^{OT}	3–5–5 (0–1–2)
November 15	#6 Boston University		Freitas Ice Forum • Storrs, CT	Annie Belanger	L 2–3	3–6–5 (0–2–2)
November 16	at #6 Boston University		Walter Brown Arena • Boston, MA	Annie Belanger	L 2–4	3–7–5 (0–3–2)
November 21	at #1 Boston College		Kelley Rink • Chestnut Hill, MA	Annie Belanger	L 1–6	3–8–5 (0–4–2)
November 22	#1 Boston College		Freitas Ice Forum • Storrs, CT	Annie Belanger	L 0–6	3–9–5 (0–5–2)
November 28	#9 Clarkson*		Freitas Ice Forum • Storrs, CT (Nutmeg Classic Preliminary Game)	Elaine Chuli	L 1–2 ^{OT}	3–10–5
November 29	Yale*		Freitas Ice Forum • Storrs, CT (Nutmeg Classic 3rd Place Game)	Elaine Chuli	W 3–1	4–10–5
January 3, 2015	at Northeastern		Matthews Arena • Boston, MA	Elaine Chuli	T 3–3 ^{OT}	4–10–6 (0–5–3)
January 6	at #6 Harvard*		Bright-Landry Hockey Center • Allston, MA	Elaine Chuli	L 2–8	4–11–6
January 10	Vermont		Freitas Ice Forum • Storrs, CT	Elaine Chuli	W 5–1	5–11–6 (1–5–3)
January 11	Vermont		Freitas Ice Forum • Storrs, CT	Annie Belanger	W 4–3	6–11–6 (2–5–3)
January 17	New Hampshire		Freitas Ice Forum • Storrs, CT	Elaine Chuli	L 2–3 ^{OT}	6–12–6 (2–6–3)
January 18	New Hampshire		Freitas Ice Forum • Storrs, CT	Annie Belanger	L 1–3	6–13–6 (2–7–3)
January 24	at Providence		Schneider Arena • Providence, RI	Elaine Chuli	L 1–4	6–14–6 (2–8–3)
January 25	Providence		Freitas Ice Forum • Storrs, CT	Annie Belanger	W 4–1	7–14–6 (3–8–3)
January 31	#7 Boston University		Freitas Ice Forum • Storrs, CT	Elaine Chuli	L 3–5	7–15–6 (3–9–3)
February 6	at #1 Boston College		Kelley Rink • Chestnut Hill, MA	Elaine Chuli	L 0–6	7–16–6 (3–10–3)
February 8	at New Hampshire		Whittemore Center • Durham, NH	Elaine Chuli	T 2–2 ^{OT}	7–16–7 (3–10–4)
February 14	Northeastern		Freitas Ice Forum • Storrs, CT	Elaine Chuli	L 3–4	7–17–7 (3–11–4)
February 15	Northeastern		Freitas Ice Forum • Storrs, CT	Annie Belanger	T 2–2 ^{OT}	7–17–8 (3–11–5)
February 21	at Maine		Alfond Arena • Orono, ME	Elaine Chuli	W 2–1 ^{OT}	8–17–8 (4–11–5)
February 22	at Maine		Alfond Arena • Orono, ME	Elaine Chuli	W 6–2	9–17–8 (5–11–5)
WHEA Tournament
February 27	at Maine*		Alfond Arena • Orono, ME (Quarterfinal round, Game 1)	Elaine Chuli	W 3–2	10–17–8
February 28	at Maine*		Alfond Arena • Orono, ME (Quarterfinal round, Game 2)	Elaine Chuli	W 1–0 ^{OT}	11–17–8
March 7	vs. #1 Boston College*		Hyannis Youth and Community Center • Hyannis, MA (Semifinal Game)	Elaine Chuli	L 1–3	11–18–8
*Non-conference game. ^{#}Rankings from USCHO.com Poll.

== Awards and honors ==
- Goaltender Elaine Chuli named team MVP
- Elaine Chuli was invited to the Team Canada Development team

=== Hockey East All-Stars ===
- Elaine Chuli, Honorable Mention
