= Karen Nystrom =

Canadian ice hockey player (born 1969)

- Born: June 17, 1969 (age 57) Scarborough, Ontario, Canada
- Height: 5 ft 6 in (168 cm)
- Weight: 139 lb (63 kg; 9 st 13 lb)
- Position: Forward
- Shot: Left
- COWHL Hockey East NWHL team: Toronto Red Wings; Newtonbrook Panthers; Northeastern; Brampton Thunder
- National team: Canada
- Playing career: 1985–2003
Medal record
Women's ice hockey
Representing Canada
Olympic Games
Silver medal – second place	1998 Nagano	Tournament
3 Nations Cup
Gold medal – first place	1996
IIHF World Women's Championships
Gold medal – first place	1992 Finland	Tournament
Gold medal – first place	1994 United States	Tournament
Gold medal – first place	1997 Canada	Tournament

Karen Nystrom (born June 17, 1969) is a retired Canadian ice hockey player. She was a member of the 1998 Canadian national women's ice hockey team and played for the Scarborough Firefighters, Toronto Red Wings, Brampton Thunder, and Beatrice Aeros.

== Playing career ==
Prior to joining the Canadian National women's team for the 1992 Women's World ice hockey championships, Nystrom participated in the Central Ontario Women's Hockey League. Nystrom competed for the Scarborough Firefighters (1985 to 1991) and the Toronto Redwings. Prior to the 1998 Olympics, Nystrom also played hockey for the Northeastern Huskies women's ice hockey program. She would play with the Brampton Thunder from 1997 to 2003. During the 2000–01 NWHL season, Nystrom played with the Brampton Thunder and finished fourth in league scoring with 48 points.

== Other ==
Karen Nystrom was also a soccer player who competed for Scarborough United. In 2006, Nystrom was hired as an assistant coach for the Ontario Tech Ridgebacks women's ice hockey program, representing the University of Ontario Institute of Technology in Oshawa, Ontario. Prior to accepting the job, she had worked for over 10 years as a customer service manager for Nike Canada.

In March 2009, she would become the Ridgebacks head coach. Spending six seasons in this capacity, she led the team to consecutive OUA playoff appearances in 2013 and 2014, both first round exits. In addition, the Ridgebacks enjoyed their first season of double digit wins under Nystrom's tutelage, amassing 12 wins in the 2011–12 campaign.

== Career statistics ==
=== Regular season and playoffs ===
			Regular season					Playoffs
Season	Team	League	GP	G	A	Pts	PIM	GP	G	A	Pts	PIM
1992-93	Scarborough Firefighters	COWHL	27	21	11	32	28	—	—	—	—	—
1993-94	Scarborough Firefighters	COWHL	28	22	24	46	38	—	—	—	—	—
1995-96	Toronto Red Wings	COWHL	29	23	20	43	42	—	—	—	—	—
1996-97	Newtonbrook Panthers	COWHL	31	36	48	84	54	—	—	—	—	—
1998-99	Brampton Thunder	NWHL	25	23	14	37	38	—	—	—	—	—
1999-2000	Brampton Thunder	NWHL	36	34	30	64	30	—	—	—	—	—
2000-01	Brampton Thunder	NWHL	34	21	34	55	46	4	2	2	4	4
2001-02	Brampton Thunder	NWHL	23	18	17	35	31	4	3	1	4	14
2002-03	Brampton Thunder	NWHL	2	0	0	0	0	—	—	—	—	—
	Beatrice Aeros	NWHL	28	15	20	35	14	—	—	—	—	—
2003-04	Brampton Thunder	NWHL	9	2	4	6	4	5	0	3	3	2

=== International ===
Year	Team	Event	Result	GP	G	A	Pts	PIM
1992	Canada	WC	1st place, gold medalist(s)	5	3	2	5	6
1994	Canada	WC	1st place, gold medalist(s)	4	1	1	2	6
1997	Canada	WC	1st place, gold medalist(s)	5	1	2	3	2
1998	Canada	OG	2nd place, silver medalist(s)	5	1	0	1	2

== Awards and honours ==
- Won COWHL scoring title in 1991–92 (runner-up in 1990–91, 1992–93 and

1996–97)

- COWHL All-Star Team every year from 1989 to 1997
- OWHA champion with Scarborough Firefighters, 1991
