= Kayla Tutino =

Canadian-Italian ice hockey player (born 1992)

- Born: December 18, 1992 (age 33) Montreal, Quebec, Canada
- Height: 1.65 m (5 ft 5 in)
- Weight: 64 kg (141 lb; 10 st 1 lb)
- Position: Forward
- Shoots: Right
- IHLW team Former teams: AHC Lakers; Boston University Terriers; Boston Blades; Les Canadiennes de Montréal
- Coached for: Dawson College Blues; McGill Martlets; Italy
- National team: Italy
- Playing career: 2010–present
- Coaching career: 2018–present

Kayla Tutino (born December 18, 1992) is a Canadian-Italian ice hockey player and coach. She has played in the Italian Hockey League Women (IHLW) with the AHC Lakers since 2024 and is a member of the Italian women's national ice hockey team.

Tutino previously played in the Canadian Women's Hockey League (CWHL) with the Boston Blades and Les Canadiennes de Montréal. Her coaching career has included seasons served as head coach of the Dawson College Blues women's ice hockey program, associate head coach of the McGill Martlets ice hockey program, and video coach of the Italian women's national ice hockey team.

== Playing career ==
=== College ===
Tutino played five seasons of college ice hockey with the Boston University Terriers women's ice hockey program in the Hockey East (HEA) conference of the NCAA Division I. During her time with the Terriers, the program won four consecutive Hockey East championships (2012–2015). Following the 2015 Hockey East tournament, Tutino was named to the All-Tournament Team alongside teammates Shannon Doyle and captain Marie-Philip Poulin.

=== CWHL ===
Tutino was drafted first overall by the Boston Blades in the 2016 CWHL Draft. She became the first female athlete from Boston University to be selected first overall in a professional draft.

On April 25, 2017, Tutino was traded to the Les Canadiennes de Montréal in exchange for Nachi Fujimoto. On September 16, 2018, Tutino announced her retirement from professional hockey.

=== IHLW ===
After five seasons off ice, Tutino returned to playing with the AHC Lakers in the Italian Hockey League Women for the 2024–25 season.

=== International ===
Tutino was named an alternate captain for Italy at the 2026 Winter Olympics. Making her Olympic debut on February 5, Italy opposed France, who were making their Olympic debut. Tutino scored her team's first goal of the game as Italy prevailed in a 4-1 final.

== Coaching career ==
Tutino served as head coach of the Dawson College Blues women's ice hockey program in the Ligue de Hockey Collégiale du Québec (LHCQ/QCHL) of the Association canadienne du sport collégial (ACSC/CCAA) during 2020 to 2022. During that period, she also coached an under-18 boys ice hockey team at the Collège Notre-Dame du Sacré-Cœur.

In 2022, she accepted the associate coach position with the McGill Martlets in the Réseau du sport étudiant du Québec (RSEQ) of U Sports.

She was appointed video of the Italian women's national ice hockey team by general manager Daniele Sauvageau for the 2023–24 season.

== Personal life ==
Her mother and four grandparents were born in Italy and Tutino held an Italian passport prior to her involvement with the Italian national team. She speaks English, French, and Italian.

She graduated from Boston University with a bachelor of science in advertising in 2015, and a master's of science in administrative studies (MSAS) in 2016.

Tutino is married.

== Career statistics ==
Season	Team	League	GP	G	A	Pts	+/-	PIM
2011-12	Boston University Terriers	HEA	38	19	20	39		30
2012-13	Boston University Terriers	HEA	37	15	13	28		20
2013-14	Boston University Terriers	HEA	14	4	6	10		6
2014-15	Boston University Terriers	HEA	36	14	23	37		41
2015-16	Boston University Terriers	HEA	39	11	19	30		22

== Awards and honours ==
- Most Valuable Player, Ontario Hockey Academy, 2010-11 season
- Hockey East Rookie of the Week (Week of October 17, 2011)
- Hockey East Player of the Week (Week of November 21, 2011)
- Hockey East Rookie of the Week (Week of January 9. 2012)
- 2014-15 Hockey East Second Team All-Star
- 2015 Hockey East All-Tournament Team

Awards and achievements
Preceded by Sarah Edney	CWHL first overall draft pick 2016	Succeeded by Courtney Turner
