= 2014–15 Providence Friars women's ice hockey season =

- Conference: 8th HEA
- Home ice: Schneider Arena

Record
- Overall: 6–25–4
- Home: 4–10–1
- Road: 2–15–3

Coaches and captains
- Head coach: Bob Deraney
- Assistant coaches: Melanie Ruzzi; Meredith Roth
- Captain(s): Beth Hanrahan; Victoria Virtue
- Alternate captain(s): Stephanie Demars; Lexi Romanchuk

The Providence Friars represented Providence College in Women's Hockey East Association play during the 2014–15 NCAA Division I women's ice hockey season.

== Offseason ==
- August 20: Four Providence Grads were drafted by the Boston Blades of the CWHL, including Janine Weber '14, Laura Veharanta '12, Rebecca Morse '14 and Corinne Buie '14.

=== Recruiting ===
Player	Position	Nationality	Notes
Alanna Serviss	Goaltender	United States	Played with Chicago Young Americans
Lauren Klein	Defense	United States	Played with Mounds View HS

== Roster ==
No.	Nat.	Player	Class	Pos	Height	DoB	Hometown	Previous team
2		Ariana Buxman	Sophomore	D	5' 6" (1.68 m)		Glenwood Springs, Colorado	Shattuck St. Mary's
4		Blair Parent	Freshman	F	5' 5" (1.65 m)		Blaine, Minnesota	Anoka HS
5		Courtney Kukowski	Junior	F	5' 7" (1.7 m)		Apple Valley, Minnesota	Eastview HS
7		Liv Havorson	Sophomore	D	5' 9" (1.75 m)		Richfield, Minnesota	Benilde St. Margaret's
8		Lexi Romanchuk (A)	Junior	D	5' 6" (1.68 m)		San Jose, California	San Jose Jr. Sharks
9		Stephanie DeMars (A)	Senior	F	5' 7" (1.7 m)		Vermontville, New York	National Sports Academy
11		Brooke Boquist	Freshman	F	5' 4" (1.63 m)		Thunder Bay, Ontario	Shattuck-St. Mary's
14		Victoria Virtue (C)	Senior	D	5' 9" (1.75 m)		Walpole, Massachusetts	Assabet Valley
16		Brittney Thunstrom	Junior	F	5' 9" (1.75 m)		Coon Rapids, Minnesota	Blaine HS
17		Brooke Simpson	Senior	F	5' 8" (1.73 m)		Boxborough, Massachusetts	Assabet Valley
18		Ariana Reed	Sophomore	D	5' 3" (1.6 m)		Lakeville, Minnesota	Lakeville South HS
19		Suzie Lundeen	Senior	D	5' 4" (1.63 m)		Minneapolis, Minnesota	Edina HS
21		Haley Frade	Senior	F	5' 8" (1.73 m)		Marion, Massachusetts	Tabor Academy
22		Kendra Goodrich	Sophomore	D	5' 9" (1.75 m)		Apple Valley, Minnesota	Rosemount HS
23		Madison Sansone	Freshman	F	5' 3" (1.6 m)		Lockport, New York	Buffalo Bisons
24		Lauren Klein	Sophomore	D	5' 5" (1.65 m)		Shoreview, Minnesota	RIT
26		Allison Micheletti	Senior	F	5' 7" (1.7 m)		Inver Grove Heights, Minnesota	Rosemount HS
27		Sarah Bryant	Junior	G	5' 8" (1.73 m)		Bethlehem, Pennsylvania	New Jersey Colonials
28		Beth Hanrahan (C)	Senior	F	5' 8" (1.73 m)		Poolesville, Maryland	National Sports Academy
29		Cassidy Carels	Sophomore	F	5' 5" (1.65 m)		Bruxelles, Manitoba	Team Canada U18
31		Allie Morse	Junior	G	5' 6" (1.68 m)		Cottage Grove, Minnesota	Park HS
33		Alanna Serviss	Sophomore	G	5' 7" (1.7 m)		Chicago, Illinois	Chicago Young Americans

== Schedule ==
Date	Opponent^{#}	Rank^{#}	Site	Decision	Result	Record
Regular Season
October 3	at #9 Mercyhurst*		Mercyhurst Ice Center • Erie, PA	Allie Morse	L 0–3	0–1–0
October 4	at #9 Mercyhurst*		Mercyhurst Ice Center • Erie, PA	Allie Morse	L 0–2	0–2–0
October 11	Clarkson*		Schneider Arena • Providence, RI	Allie Morse	L 0–5	0–3–0
October 11	Clarkson*		Schneider Arena • Providence, RI	Sarah Bryant	L 0–3	0–4–0
October 18	at Syracuse*		Tennity Ice Pavilion • Syracuse, NY	Allie Morse	T 3–3 ^{OT}	0–4–1
October 19	at Colgate*		Starr Rink • Hamilton, NY	Sarah Bryant	L 1–2	0–5–1
October 24	Yale*		Schneider Arena • Providence, RI	Allie Morse	L 2–6	0–6–1
October 25	at Yale*		Ingalls Rink • New Haven, CT	Sarah Bryant	L 2–5	0–7–1
October 31	at #2 Boston College		Kelley Rink • Chestnut Hill, MA	Allie Morse	L 0–8	0–8–1 (0–1–0)
November 1	#2 Boston College		Schneider Arena • Providence, RI	Allie Morse	L 1–4	0–9–1 (0–2–0)
November 7	at Union*		Achilles Center • Schenectady, NY	Allie Morse	T 2–2 ^{OT}	0–9–2
November 9	Connecticut		Schneider Arena • Providence, RI	Sarah Bryant	T 4–4 ^{OT}	0–9–3 (0–2–1)
November 15	Northeastern		Schneider Arena • Providence, RI	Allie Morse	W 4–1	1–9–3 (1–2–1)
November 16	at Northeastern		Matthews Arena • Boston, MA	Allie Morse	L 2–6	1–10–3 (1–3–1)
November 22	at Maine		Alfond Arena • Orono, ME	Allie Morse	L 2–3	1–11–3 (1–4–1)
November 23	at Maine		Alfond Arena • Orono, ME	Allie Morse	W 2–1 ^{OT}	2–11–3 (2–4–1)
November 28	at Brown*		Meehan Auditorium • Providence, RI (Mayor's Cup)	Allie Morse	L 1–2	2–12–3
November 29	Brown*		Schneider Arena • Providence, RI	Allie Morse	W 4–2	3–12–3
December 5	New Hampshire		Schneider Arena • Providence, RI	Allie Morse	L 0–5	3–13–3 (2–5–1)
December 8	at #4 Boston University		Walter Brown Arena • Boston, MA	Allie Morse	L 1–3	3–14–3 (2–6–1)
January 6, 2015	at Rensselaer*		Houston Field House • Troy, NY	Sarah Bryant	T 3–3 ^{OT}	3–14–4
January 10	New Hampshire		Schneider Arena • Providence, RI	Allie Morse	W 3–1	4–14–4 (3–6–1)
January 11	at New Hampshire		Whittemore Center • Durham, NH	Allie Morse	W 4–1	5–14–4 (4–6–1)
January 18	Maine		Schneider Arena • Providence, RI	Allie Morse	L 0–2	5–15–4 (4–7–1)
January 24	Connecticut		Schneider Arena • Providence, RI	Allie Morse	W 0–2	6–15–4 (5–7–1)
January 25	at Connecticut		Freitas Ice Forum • Storrs, CT	Allie Morse	L 1–4	6–16–4 (5–8–1)
January 30	#1 Boston College		Schneider Arena • Providence, RI	Allie Morse	L 2–4	6–17–4 (5–9–1)
February 1	at Vermont		Gutterson Fieldhouse • Burlington, VT	Allie Morse	L 3–7	6–18–4 (5–10–1)
February 6	at Northeastern		Matthews Arena • Boston, MA	Allie Morse	L 1–2 ^{OT}	6–19–4 (5–11–1)
February 14	#7 Boston University		Schneider Arena • Providence, RI	Allie Morse	L 1–6	6–20–4 (5–12–1)
February 16	at #7 Boston University		Walter Brown Arena • Boston, MA	Allie Morse	L 1–7	6–21–4 (5–13–1)
February 21	Vermont		Schneider Arena • Providence, RI	Allie Morse	L 2–3	6–22–4 (5–14–1)
February 22	Vermont		Schneider Arena • Providence, RI	Allie Morse	L 2–3	6–23–4 (5–15–1)
WHEA Tournament
February 27	at #1 Boston College*		Kelley Rink • Boston, MA (Quarterfinals Game 1)	Allie Morse	L 2–6	6–24–4
February 28	at #1 Boston College*		Kelley Rink • Boston, MA (Quarterfinals Game 2)	Allie Morse	L 0–8	6–25–4
*Non-conference game. ^{#}Rankings from USCHO.com Poll.

== Awards and honors ==
- Beth Hanrahan wins Hockey East Best Sportsman Award
- 13 Women's hockey players won Hockey East All Scholastic honors

== Miscellaneous ==
- Janine Weber ('14) becoame the first player to sign with the newly inaugurated NWHL, with the New York Riveters.
