= 2014–15 Maine Black Bears women's ice hockey season =

- Conference: 4th WHEA
- Home ice: Alfond Arena

Record
- Overall: 10–20–3
- Home: 5–11–1
- Road: 5–9–2

Coaches and captains
- Head coach: Richard Reichenbach
- Assistant coaches: Sara Reichenbach; Kendall Newell
- Captain: Jennifer More
- Alternate captain(s): Brittany Huneke, Katy Massey

The Maine Black Bears represented University of Maine in the WHEA during the 2014–15 NCAA Division I women's ice hockey season.

== Offseason ==
- Katy Massey and Brianne Kilgour were named to the WHEA all-scholastic team.

=== Recruiting ===
Player	Position	Nationality	Notes
Taylor Landry	Forward	United States	Auburn/Leavitt Red Hornets
Brooke Stacey	Forward	Canada	Ontario Hockey Academy
Catherine Tufts	Forward	Canada	Ontario Hockey Academy
Mikayla Rogers	Defense	United States	St. Paul Blades
Victoria Hummel	Forward	Austria	Scanlon Creek Hockey Academy

== Roster ==
=== 2014-15 Black Bears ===
No.	Nat.	Player	Class	Pos	Height	DoB	Hometown	Previous team
3		Brooke Stacey	Freshman	F	5' 10" (1.78 m)		Kahnawake, Quebec	Team Canada U18
4		Jessica Vallotton	Sophomore	D	6' 0" (1.83 m)		Glenboro, Manitoba	Westman Wildcats
6		Brittney Huneke (A)	Senior	D	5' 7" (1.7 m)		Hastings, Minnesota	Hastings HS
7		Jessica Hall	Senior	D	5' 6" (1.68 m)		Ingersoll, Ontario	Kitchener-Waterloo Rangers
8		Brooklyn Langlois	Junior	D	5' 6" (1.68 m)		Steinbach, Manitoba	Team Manitoba
9		Mikayla Rogers	Freshman	D	5' 7" (1.7 m)		St. Paul, Minnesota	St. Paul Blades
10		Jillian Langtry	Junior	F	5' 2" (1.57 m)		Fort Frances, Ontario	Thunder Bay Queens
11		Victoria Hummel	Freshman	F	5' 3" (1.6 m)		Tulln, Austria	EHV Sabers
12		Emilie Brigham	Sophomore	F	5' 5" (1.65 m)		Anoka, Minnesota	Anoka HS
13		Tori Pasquariello	Senior	F	5' 7" (1.7 m)		Mississauga, Ontario	St. Francis Xavier
14		Taylor Landry	Freshman	F	5' 5" (1.65 m)		Auburn, Maine	Auburn/Leavitt Red Hornets
15		Catherine Tufts	Freshman	F	5' 6" (1.68 m)		Church Point, Nova Scotia	Ontario Hockey Academy
16		Kelsey Macsorley	Junior	D	5' 6" (1.68 m)		Stratford, Ontario	St. Michael CSS
17		Jennifer More (C)	Senior	F	5' 5" (1.65 m)		Deloraine, Manitoba	Athol Murray College of Notre Dame
18		Katy Massey (A)	Senior	F	5' 1" (1.55 m)		Waterville, Maine	Waterville HS
19		Eve Boissonneault	Sophomore	F	5' 6" (1.68 m)		Sudbury, Ontario
20		Morgan Sakundiak	Sophomore	F	5' 4" (1.63 m)		Calgary, Alberta	Pursuit of Excellence
21		Audra Richards	Junior	F	5' 8" (1.73 m)		Maplewood, Minnesota	Tartan HS
23		Anna Wright	Sophomore	D	5' 11" (1.8 m)		North Berwick, Maine	Berwick Academy
24		Hailey Browne	Senior	F	5' 4" (1.63 m)		Oakville, Ontario	Mercyhurst
26		Abbey Cook	Junior	F	5' 5" (1.65 m)		Fairport, New York	Fairport HS
27		Mariah Fujimagari	Sophomore	G	5' 10" (1.78 m)		Markham, Ontario	Markham-Stoufville Stars
28		Shawna Lesperance	Junior	F	5' 5" (1.65 m)		Belle River, Ontario	Culver Academy
29		Kristin Gilmore	Sophomore	D	5' 10" (1.78 m)		Millgrove, Ontario	Oakville Jr. Hornets
30		Natalie Robinson	Junior	G	5' 8" (1.73 m)		Huntsville, Ontario	Huron Heights
31		Meghann Treacy	Junior	G	5' 9" (1.75 m)		Lake Peekskill, New York	Williston Northhampton

== Schedule ==
Date	Opponent^{#}	Rank^{#}	Site	Decision	Result	Record
Regular Season
September 27	New Hampshire		Alfond Arena • Orono, ME	Meghann Treacy	W 2–1	1–0–0 (1–0–0)
October 3	Robert Morris*		Alfond Arena • Orono, ME	Meghann Treacy	W 3–2 ^{OT}	2–0–0
October 4	Robert Morris*		Alfond Arena • Orono, ME	Meghann Treacy	L 0–1	2–1–0
October 10	#7 Mercyhurst*		Alfond Arena • Orono, ME	Meghann Treacy	L 0–1	2–2–0
October 11	#7 Mercyhurst*		Alfond Arena • Orono, ME	Mariah Fujimagari	T 2–2 ^{OT}	2–2–1
October 17	at #9 Quinnipiac*		TD Bank Sports Center • Hamden, CT	Meghann Treacy	L 0–4	2–3–1
October 18	at #9 Quinnipiac*		TD Bank Sports Center • Hamden, CT	Meghann Treacy	L 0–2	2–4–1
October 24	#6 Boston University		Alfond Arena • Orono, ME	Meghann Treacy	L 0–3	2–5–1 (1–1–0)
October 25	#6 Boston University		Alfond Arena • Orono, ME	Meghann Treacy	W 4–2	3–5–1 (2–1–0)
October 31	at Connecticut		Freitas Ice Forum • Storrs, CT	Meghann Treacy	T 3–3 ^{OT}	3–5–2 (2–1–1)
November 1	at Northeastern		Matthews Arena • Boston, MA	Mariah Fujimagari	W 1–0	4–5–2 (3–1–1)
November 7	at Brown*		Meehan Auditorium • Providence, RI	Meghann Treacy	L 2–5	4–6–2
November 8	at Brown*		Meehan Auditorium • Providence, RI	Mariah Fujimagari	L 3–5	4–7–2
November 22	Providence		Alfond Arena • Orono, ME	Meghann Treacy	W 3–2	5–7–2 (4–1–1)
November 23	Providence		Alfond Arena • Orono, ME	Meghann Treacy	L 1–2 ^{OT}	5–8–2 (4–2–1)
November 29	at Vermont		Gutterson Fieldhouse • Burlington, VT	Meghann Treacy	W 3–0	6–8–2 (5–2–1)
November 30	at Vermont		Gutterson Fieldhouse • Burlington, VT	Meghann Treacy	W 2–1	7–8–2 (6–2–1)
December 5	#1 Boston College		Alfond Arena • Orono, ME	Meghann Treacy	L 1–8	7–9–2 (6–3–1)
December 12	at Union*		Achilles Center • Schnectady, NY	Meghann Treacy	L 0–2	7–10–2
December 13	at Union*		Achilles Center • Schnectady, NY	Meghann Treacy	T 1–1 ^{OT}	7–10–3
January 10, 2015	at #4 Boston University		Walter Brown Arena • Boston, MA	Meghann Treacy	L 3–5	7–11–3 (6–4–1)
January 18	at Providence		Schneider Arena • Providence, RI	Meghann Treacy	W 2–0	8–11–3 (7–4–1)
January 24	Northeastern		Alfond Arena • Orono, ME	Meghann Treacy	L 2–5	8–12–3 (7–5–1)
January 25	Northeastern		Alfond Arena • Orono, ME	Meghann Treacy	W 4–2	9–12–3 (8–5–1)
January 31	at New Hampshire		Whittemore Center • Durham, NH	Meghann Treacy	W 3–0	10–12–3 (9–5–1)
February 1	at New Hampshire		Whittemore Center • Durham, NH	Meghann Treacy	L 2–4	10–13–3 (9–6–1)
February 7	Vermont		Alfond Arena • Orono, ME	Meghann Treacy	L 1–2 ^{OT}	10–14–3 (9–7–1)
February 13	at #1 Boston College		Kelley Rink • Chestnut Hill, MA	Meghann Treacy	L 0–6	10–15–3 (9–8–1)
February 14	at #1 Boston College		Kelley Rink • Chestnut Hill, MA	Meghann Treacy	L 1–4	10–16–3 (9–9–1)
February 21	Connecticut		Alfond Arena • Orono, ME	Meghann Treacy	L 1–2 ^{OT}	10–17–3 (9–10–1)
February 22	Connecticut		Alfond Arena • Orono, ME	Mariah Fujimagari	L 2–6	10–18–3 (9–11–1)
WHEA Tournament
February 27	Connecticut*		Alfond Arena • Orono, ME (Quarterfinal Round, Game 1)	Meghann Treacy	L 2–3	10–19–3
February 28	Connecticut*		Alfond Arena • Orono, ME (Quarterfinal Round, Game 2)	Meghann Treacy	L 0–1 ^{OT}	13–16–5
*Non-conference game. ^{#}Rankings from USCHO.com Poll.

== Awards and honors ==
- Goalie Meghann Treacy named to WHEA First Team All-Stars
