= 2017 CWHL Draft =

General information
- Date: August 20, 2017
- Location: Hockey Hall of Fame, Toronto, ON

Overview
- First selection: Courtney Turner

The 2017 CWHL draft was the eighth in the history of the Canadian Women's Hockey League. It took place on August 20, 2017, marking the first time that the Draft involved Kunlun Red Star WIH, one of two expansion teams in the league, who are also joined by the Vanke Rays.

The list of prospects for the Draft included goaltender Noora Raty from Finland, forward Alex Carpenter and Melodie Daoust. All three were participants in the 2014 Winter Olympics. Courtney Turner was selected with the first overall pick in the draft, claimed by the Boston Blades.

== Selections by round ==
=== Round one ===
Round	Pick	Player	Position	Team	Nationality	Former Team
1	1	Courtney Turner	Forward	Boston Blades	United States	Union College
1	2	Kristyn Capizzano	Forward	Toronto Furies	Canada	Boston College
1	3	Nicole Kosta	Forward	Markham Thunder	Canada	Quinnipiac University
1	4	Melodie Daoust	Forward	Canadiennes de Montreal	Canada	McGill University
1	5	Taryn Baumgardt	Defense	Calgary Inferno	Canada	Quinnipiac University
1	6	Noora Raty	Goaltender	Kunlun Red Star WIH	Finland	Finnish National Team
1	7	Cayley Mercer	Forward	Vanke Rays	Canada	Clarkson University
2	8	Robyn Chemago	Goaltender	Boston Blades	Canada	Dartmouth College
2	9	Brittany Zuback	Forward	Toronto Furies	Canada	University of Vermont
2	10	Lindsay Grigg	Defense	Markham Thunder	Canada	Rochester Institute of Technology
2	11	Lauren Beaulieu	Defense	Canadiennes de Montreal	Canada	-
2	12	Kelly Murray	Defense	Calgary Inferno	Canada	-
2	13	Alex Carpenter	Forward	Kunlan Red Stars	United States	-
2	14	Elaine Chuli	Goalie	Vanke Rays	Canada	-
3	15	Bulbul Kartanbay	Forward	Boston Blades	Kazakhstan	-
3	16	Sydney Kidd	Forward	Toronto Furies	Canada	-
3	17	Cassie Clayton	Forward	Markham Thunder	Canada	-
3	18	Natalie Barrette	Defense	Canadiennes de Montreal	Canada	-
3	19	Sophie Shirley	Forward	Calgary Inferno	Canada	-
3	20	Shiann Darkangelo	Forward	Kunlan Red Stars	United States	-
3	21	Brooke Webster	Forward	Vanke Rays	Canada	-
4	22	Amie Varano	Defense	Boston Blades	Italy	-
4	23	Shannon Stewart	Forward	Toronto Furies	Canada	-
4	24	Devon Skeats	Forward	Markham Thunder	Canada	-
4	25	Erin Noseworthy	Forward	Canadiennes de Montreal	Canada	-
4	26	Lindsey Post	Goalie	Calgary Inferno	Canada	-
4	27	Stephanie Anderson	Forward	Kunlan Red Stars	United States	-
4	28	Hanna Bunton	Forward	Vanke Rays	Canada	Cornell University
5	29	Kaitlin Spurling	Forward	Boston Blades	United States	-
5	30	Alexa Aramburu	Forward	Toronto Furies	United States	-
5	31	Justin Treadwell	Forward	Markham Thunder	Canada	-
5	32	Emilie Bouchard	Goalie	Canadiennes de Montreal	Canada	-
5	33	Kayla Gardner	Forward	Calgary Inferno	United States	-
5	34	Zoe Hickel	Forward	Kunlan Red Stars	United States	-
5	35	Emily Janiga	Forward	Vanke Rays	United States	-
6	36	Michelle Ng	Forward	Boston Blades	United States	-
6	37	Cassidy Delainey	Forward	Toronto Furies	Canada	-
6	38	Riana Langford	Forward	Markham Thunder	Canada	-
6	39	Erin Hall	Defense	Boston Blades	Canada	-
6	40	Kelty Apperson	Forward	Calgary Inferno	Canada	-
6	41	Taylor Marchin	Defense	Kunlan Red Stars	United States	-
6	42	Ashleigh Brykaliuk	Forward	Vanke Rays	United States	-
7	43	Meaghan Spurling	Defense	Boston Blades	United States	-
7	44	Grace Klienbach	Forward	Toronto Furies	United States	-
7	45	Cara Sayles	Forward	Markham Thunder	Canada	-
7	46	Kelly Kittredge	Defense	Boston Blades	United States	-
7	47	Lyndsay Kirkham	Forward	Calgary Inferno	Canada	-
7	48	Madison Woo	Forward	Kunlan Red Stars	United States	-
7	49	Emma Woods	Forward	Vanke Rays	Canada	-
8	50	Eva Tataroglu	Defense	Boston Blades	Turkey	-
8	51	Michelle Evagelou	Forward	Toronto Furies	Canada	-
8	52	Megan Delay	Defense	Markham Thunder	Canada	-
8	53	Tracy-Ann Lavigne	Forward	Canadiennes de Montreal	Canada	-
8	54	Anissa Gamble	Forward	Calgary Inferno	Canada	-
8	55	Melanie Jue	Forward	Kunlan Red Stars	Canada	-
8	56	Xin Fang	Forward	Vanke Rays	China	-
9	57	Kristen Embrey	Forward	Boston Blades	United States	-
9	58	Maeve Kehoe	Forward	Toronto Furies	Canada	-
9	59	Itsuki Baba	Defense	Markham Thunder	Japan	-
9	60	Marie-Soleil Deschênes	Goalie	Canadiennes de Montreal	Canada	-
9	61	Kennedy Brown	Forward	Calgary Inferno	Canada	-
9	62	-	-	-	-	-
9	63	Qinan Zhao	Defense	Vanke Rays	China	-
10	64	Erin Dwyer	Forward	Boston Blades	United States	-
10	65	Audrey-Ann Boutour	Forward	Toronto Furies	Canada	-
10	66	Maria Sorokina	Goalie	Markham Thunder	Russia	-
10	67	Cindy Laurin	Forward	Canadiennes de Montreal	Canada	-
10	68	Megan Grenon	Defense	Calgary Inferno	Canada	-
10	69	Zhixin Liu	Defense	Kunlan Red Stars	China	-
10	70	Rose Alleva	Defense	Vanke Rays	United States	-
11	71	Alison Quinn	Forward	Boston Blades	United States	-
11	72	Alessandra Bianchi	Forward	Toronto Furies	Canada	-
11	73	Anna Goulding	Defense	Markham Thunder	NZ$	-
11	74	Lore Baudrit	Forward	Canadiennes de Montreal	France	-
11	75	Angela Burke	Forward	Calgary Inferno	Canada	-
11	76	Lu Wen	Forward	Kunlan Red Stars	China	-
11	77	Lauren Kelly	Defense	Vanke Rays	United States	-
12	78	Sarah Park	Goalie	Boston Blades	United States	-
12	79	Brooke Gibson	Goalie	Toronto Furies	Canada	-
12	80	Carly Richardson	Goalie	Markham Thunder	Canada	-
12	81	Shayna Dominique	Goalie	Canadiennes de Montreal	Canada	-
12	82	Hayley Rodger	Forward	Calgary Inferno	Canada	-
12	83	Yuqing Wang	Goalie	Kunlan Red Stars	China	-
12	84	Minghui Kong	Forward	Vanke Rays	China	-
13	85	Casey Stathopoulos	Forward	Boston Blades	United States	-
13	86	Nicole Magee	Goalie	Toronto Furies	United States	-
13	87	Krista Wilson	Forward	Calgary Inferno	Canada	-
13	88	Siye He	Goalie	Kunlan Red Stars	China	-
13	89	Xin He	Forward	Vanke Rays	China	-
14	90	Ashley Ryan	Forward	Boston Blades	United States	-
14	91	Rui Zhu	Forward	Kunlan Red Stars	China	-
14	92	Yue Lyu	Forward	Vanke Rays	China	-
15	93	Tayrn Harris	Defense	Boston Blades	United States	-
15	94	Liying Yang	Forward	Kunlan Red Stars	China	-
15	95	Bo Wang	Defense	Vanke Rays	China	-
16	96	Rachel Vigliano	Forward	Boston Blades	United States	-
16	97	Wenzhuo Wang	Forward	Kunlan Red Stars	China	-
16	98	Yianyi Zhang	Goalie	Vanke Rays	China	-
17	99	Megan Servaes	Defense	Boston Blades	United States	-
17	100	Lixue Xing	Defense	Kunlan Red Stars	China	-
17	101	Hongxin Yan	Defense	Vanke Rays	China	-
18	102	Gabriella Crugnale	Forward	Boston Blades	United States	-
18	103	Yue Hou	Defense	Kunlan Red Stars	China	-
18	104	Jiachao Xu	Defense	Vanke Rays	China	-
19	105	Casey Breese	Forward	Boston Blades	United States	-
19	106	Naixin Zhou	Defense	Kunlan Red Stars	China	-
19	107	Han Gao	Forward	Vanke Rays	China	-
20	108	Lizzie Averson	Forward	Boston Blades	United States	-
20	109	Bowen Jiang	Forward	Kunlan Red Stars	China	-
20	110	Jinqiu Xiao	Defense	Vanke Rays	China	-
21	111	Cassandra Sherman	Forward	Boston Blades	United States	-
22	112	Cassie Dunne	Defense	Boston Blades	United States	-
23	113	Carolyn Campbell	Forward	Boston Blades	Canada	-

== Transactions ==
- Pick 39 was traded from Montreal to Boston
- Pick 46 was traded from Montreal to Boston
