= 2014–15 Boston University Terriers women's ice hockey season =

WHEA Tournament Champions Reached NCAA Tournament, Defeated by Wisconsin in Opening Round
- Conference: 2nd WHEA
- Home ice: Walter Brown Arena

Rankings
- USA Today/USA Hockey Magazine: 5
- USCHO.com: 5

Record
- Overall: 25–9–3
- Home: 11–2–2
- Road: 10–7–1
- Neutral: 4–0–0

Coaches and captains
- Head coach: Brian Durocher
- Assistant coaches: Katie Lachapelle; Allison Coomey
- Captain: Marie-Philip Poulin

The Boston University Terriers represented Boston University in the Women's Hockey East Association during the 2014–15 season. The #5 Terriers won the WHEA Tournament by upsetting #1 Boston College. They earned a berth in the NCAA Tournament, where they lost to Wisconsin in the quarterfinal round.

== Offseason ==
- August 5: Three current members of the Terriers roster were invited to the Canadian U22 camp. Shannon Doyle, Sarah Lefort and Samantha Sutherland were joined by incoming freshmen Victoria Bach and Rebecca Leslie. 2014 graduate Louise Warren was also in attendance. Maddie Elia was invited to the USA Hockey Women's National Festival in Lake Placid, New York. Both camps were used to determine rosters for a three-game series involving the Canadian and US Under-22 teams from August 21–24 in Calgary, Alberta. Of note, Terriers assistant coach Katie Lachapelle was also at the Festival. She was to serve as an assistant coach on the US Under-18 Team.

=== Recruiting ===
| Player | Position | Nationality | Notes |
|---|---|---|---|
| Victoria Bach | Forward | Canada | Mississauga Jr. Chiefs |
| Rebecca Leslie | Forward | Canada | Ottawa Senators |
| Savannah Newton | Defense | Canada | Appleby College |
| Erin O’Neil | Goaltender | United States | Hopkins |
| Anna Streifel | Forward | United States | Washington Pride |

== Roster ==
=== 2014-15 Terriers ===
| No. | Nat. | Player | Class | Pos | Height | DoB | Hometown | Previous team |
|---|---|---|---|---|---|---|---|---|
| 4 | | Sarah Steele | Sophomore | D | 5' 6" (1.68 m) | 1995-04-10 | Stratford, Prince Edward Island | Appleby College |
| 6 | | Shannon Doyle | Senior | D | 5' 4" (1.63 m) | 1992-03-09 | Baldwin, Ontario | Colgate |
| 7 | | Shannon Stoneburgh | Senior | D | 5' 11" (1.8 m) | 1993-05-24 | Pickering, Ontario | St. Mary's, Toronto |
| 8 | | Kayla Tutino | Junior | F | 5' 5" (1.65 m) | 1992-12-18 | Lorraine, Quebec | Ontario Hockey Academy |
| 9 | | Sarah Lefort | Junior | F | 5' 7" (1.7 m) | 1994-02-09 | Ormstown, Quebec | Stanstead College |
| 10 | | Alexis Woloschuk | Junior | F | 5' 7" (1.7 m) | 1994-04-06 | Winnipeg, Manitoba | Pursuit of Excellence |
| 11 | | Dakota Woodworth | Junior | F | 5' 7" (1.7 m) | 1994-03-17 | Carlisle, Massachusetts | Boston Shamrocks |
| 12 | | Victoria Bach | Freshman | F | 5' 4" (1.63 m) | 1996-07-12 | Milton, Ontario | Mississauga Jr. Chiefs |
| 14 | | Maddie Elia | Sophomore | F | 5' 10" (1.78 m) | 1995-05-31 | Lewiston, New York | Nichols School |
| 15 | | Lillian Ribeirinha-Braga | Junior | D | 5' 3" (1.6 m) | 1994-08-27 | Winchester, Massachusetts | Winchendon School |
| 16 | | Caroline Campbell | Senior | D | 5' 7" (1.7 m) | 1991-08-22 | St. Louis, Missouri | Chicago Mission U19 |
| 17 | | Diana Bennett | Junior | D | 5' 5" (1.65 m) | 1993-03-06 | Narragansett, Rhode Island | Cushing Academy |
| 18 | | Rebecca Russo | Junior | F | 5' 4" (1.63 m) | 1994-04-22 | Westport, Connecticut | Shattuck-St. Mary's |
| 19 | | Rebecca Leslie | Freshman | F | 5' 4" (1.63 m) | 1996-05-08 | Ottawa, Ontario | Ottawa Senators (PWHL) |
| 20 | | Samantha Sutherland | Sophomore | F | 5' 4" (1.63 m) | 1995-02-22 | Cochrane, Alberta | Warner School |
| 21 | | Natalie Flynn | Sophomore | F | 5' 7" (1.7 m) | 1994-05-19 | Medford, Massachusetts | Cushing Academy |
| 22 | | Anna Streifel | Freshman (RS) | F | 5' 10" (1.78 m) | 1996-05-28 | Bowie, Maryland | Washington Pride |
| 23 | | Sarah Bayersdorfer | Senior | F | 5' 6" (1.68 m) | 1993-01-22 | Short Hills, New Jersey | Morrisstown-Beard School |
| 25 | | Alexis Crossley | Junior | D | 5' 8" (1.73 m) | 1994-04-07 | Cole Harbour, Nova Scotia | New Hampshire |
| 27 | | Jordan Juron | Junior | F | 5' 8" (1.73 m) | 1994-06-05 | Latham, New York | Middlesex School |
| 28 | | Savannah Newton | Freshman | D | 5' 4" (1.63 m) | 1996-02-16 | Halifax, Nova Scotia | Appleby College |
| 29 | | Marie-Philip Poulin (C) | Senior | F | 5' 6" (1.68 m) | 1991-03-28 | Beauceville, Quebec | Canadian Olympic Team |
| 30 | | Mia Becker | Sophomore | G | 5' 4" (1.63 m) | 1994-08-07 | Woodbridge, Virginia | Shattuck-St. Mary's |
| 31 | | Erin O'Neil | Freshman | G | 5' 7" (1.7 m) | 1996-05-11 | Minnetonka, Minnesota | Hopkins High School |
| 33 | | Victoria Hanson | Sophomore | G | 5' 9" (1.75 m) | 1994-10-01 | Stoughton, Massachusetts | Lawrence Academy |

== Schedule ==
| Date | Opponent^{#} | Rank^{#} | Site | Decision | Result | Record |
Regular Season
| October 3 | vs. St. Cloud* | #6 | Ridder Arena • Minneapolis, MN | Victoria Hanson | W 5–2 | 1–0–0 |
| October 4 | at #1 Minnesota* | #6 | Ridder Arena • Minneapolis, MN | Erin O'Neil | L 2–5 | 1–1–0 |
| October 17 | at #7 Clarkson* | #6 | Cheel Arena • Potsdam, NY | Victoria Hanson | W 3–1 | 2–1–0 |
| October 18 | at #7 Clarkson* | #6 | Cheel Arena • Potsdam, NY | Erin O'Neil | W 5–2 | 3–1–0 |
| October 24 | at Maine | #6 | Alfond Arena • Orono, ME | Victoria Hanson | W 3–0 | 4–1–0 (1–0–0) |
| October 24 | at Maine | #6 | Alfond Arena • Orono, ME | Erin O'Neil | L 2–4 | 4–2–0 (1–1–0) |
| October 28 | Northeastern | #6 | Walter Brown Arena • Boston, MA | Erin O'Neil | W 3-2 | 5–2–0 (2–1–0) |
| November 2 | New Hampshire | #6 | Walter Brown Arena • Boston, MA | Erin O'Neil | W 4-2 | 6–2–0 (3–1–0) |
| November 8 | at Yale* | #6 | Ingalls Rink • New Haven, CT | Erin O'Neil | T 4–4 ^{OT} | 6–2–1 |
| November 11 | Northeastern | #6 | Walter Brown Arena • Boston, MA | Victoria Hanson | L 3–6 | 6–3–1 (3–2–0) |
| November 15 | at Connecticut | #6 | Freitas Ice Forum • Storrs, CT | Victoria Hanson | W 3–2 | 7–3–1 (4–2–0) |
| November 16 | Connecticut | #6 | Walter Brown Arena • Boston, MA | Victoria Hanson | W 4–2 | 8–3–1 (5–2–0) |
| November 21 | #6 Harvard* | #7 | Walter Brown Arena • Boston, MA | Victoria Hanson | T 1–1 | 8–3–2 |
| November 23 | New Hampshire | #7 | Walter Brown Arena • Boston, MA | Victoria Hanson | W 6–2 | 9–3–2 (6–2–0) |
| November 29 | at Dartmouth* | #6 | Thompson Arena • Hanover, NH | Victoria Hanson | W 4–2 | 10–3–2 |
| December 6 | at Vermont | #5 | Gutterson Fieldhouse • Burlington, VT | Victoria Hanson | W 4–1 | 11–3–2 (7–2–0) |
| December 8 | Providence | #4 | Walter Brown Arena • Boston, MA | Erin O'Neil | W 3–1 | 12–3–2 (8–2–0) |
| January 7, 2015 | at #1 Boston College | #4 | Kelley Rink • Chestnut Hill, MA | Victoria Hanson | L 3–4 | 12–4–2 (8–3–0) |
| January 10 | Maine | #4 | Walter Brown Arena • Boston, MA | Erin O'Neil | W 5–3 | 13–4–2 (9–3–0) |
| January 13 | at Cornell* | #6 | Lynah Rink • Ithaca, NY | Victoria Hanson | L 2–6 | 13–5–2 |
| January 18 | at Northeastern | #6 | Matthews Arena • Boston, MA | Erin O'Neil | W 4–3 | 14–5–2 (10–3–0) |
| January 21 | #3 Quinnipiac* | #7 | Walter Brown Arena • Boston, MA | Victoria Hanson | W 4–1 | 15–5–2 |
| January 24 | Vermont | #7 | Walter Brown Arena • Boston, MA | Erin O'Neil | L 0–2 | 15–6–2 (10–4–0) |
| January 25 | Vermont | #7 | Walter Brown Arena • Boston, MA | Victoria Hanson | W 9–2 | 16–6–2 (11–4–0) |
| January 31 | at Connecticut | #7 | Freitas Ice Forum • Storrs, CT | Erin O'Neil | W 5–3 | 17–6–2 (12–4–0) |
| February 3 | at #4 Harvard* | #6 | Bright-Landry Hockey Center • Allston, MA (Beanpot preliminary round) | Victoria Hanson | L 2–9 | 17–7–2 |
| February 7 | at New Hampshire | #6 | Whittemore Center • Durham, NH | Erin O'Neil | W 4–2 | 18–7–2 (13–4–0) |
| February 10 | vs. Northeastern* | #7 | Bright-Landry Hockey Center • Allston, MA (Beanpot consolation) | Victoria Hanson | W 3–1 | 19–7–2 |
| February 14 | at Providence | #7 | Schneider Arena • Providence, RI | Erin O'Neil | W 6–1 | 20–7–2 (14–4–0) |
| February 16 | Providence | #6 | Walter Brown Arena • Boston, MA | Victoria Hanson | W 7–1 | 21–7–2 (15–4–0) |
| February 19 | at #1 Boston College | #6 | Kelley Rink • Chestnut Hill, MA | Erin O'Neil | L 0–5 | 21–8–2 (15–5–0) |
| February 21 | #1 Boston College | #6 | Walter Brown Arena • Boston, MA | Victoria Hanson | T 2-2 ^{OT} | 21–8–3 (15–5–1) |
WHEA Tournament
| February 27 | Vermont* | #5 | Walter Brown Arena • Boston, MA (Quarterfinals, Game 1) | Victoria Hanson | W 8-1 | 22–8–3 |
| February 28 | Vermont* | #5 | Walter Brown Arena • Boston, MA (Quarterfinals, Game 2) | Victoria Hanson | W 7-2 | 23–8–3 |
| March 7 | vs. Northeastern* | #5 | Hyannis Youth and Community Center • Hyannis, MA (Semifinal Game) | Victoria Hanson | W 6-1 | 24–8–3 |
| March 8 | vs. #1 Boston College* | #5 | Hyannis Youth and Community Center • Hyannis, MA (WHEA Championship Game) | Victoria Hanson | W 4-1 | 25–8–3 |
NCAA Tournament
| March 14 | at #3 Wisconsin* | #5 | LaBahn Arena • Madison, WI (NCAA Quarterfinal Game) | Victoria Hanson | L 1-5 | 25–9–3 |
*Non-conference game. ^{#}Rankings from USCHO.com Poll.

== Awards and honors ==
- Boston University won its fourth consecutive WHEA championship, and fifth championship overall
- Marie-Philip Poulin was a finalist for the Patty Kazmaier Award, named captain of Team Canada for World Championships.
- Victoria Bach was named WHEA Rookie of the Year
- Victoria Bach, Hockey East Rookie of the Month (February 2015)
- Rebecca Leslie, Hockey East Rookie of the Month (October 2014)
- Erin O'Neill, Hockey East Rookie of the Week (Week of December 15, 2014)
- Marie-Philip Poulin, Hockey East Player of the Month (January 2015)
- Marie-Philip Poulin, Hockey East Player of the Month (February 2015)
