= 2014–15 Sacred Heart Pioneers women's ice hockey season =

- Conference: Division I Independent
- Home ice: Sports Center of Connecticut

Record
- Overall: 7-15-3
- Home: 4-5-0
- Road: 3-10-3

Coaches and captains
- Head coach: Thomas O'Malley
- Assistant coaches: Katherine Pauletti
- Captain(s): Brianna Connolly, Natasha Klinoff
- Alternate captain(s): Allanna Woodford, Casey Stathopoulos

The Sacred Heart Pioneers represented Sacred Heart University as a Division I independent team during the 2014-15 NCAA Division I women's ice hockey season.

== Roster ==
=== 2014–15 Pioneers ===
No.	Nat.	Player	Class	Pos	Height	DoB	Hometown	Previous team
1		Josy Militrano	Freshman	G			West Haven, Connecticut	West Haven HS
2		Nicole Giampa	Sophomore	F	5' 6" (1.68 m)		Cambridge, Massachusetts	Cambridge Rindge & Latin
4		Alanna Woodford (A)	Senior	F	5' 5" (1.65 m)		Scituate, Massachusetts	Scituate HS
5		Brianna Connolly (C)	Senior	F	5' 1" (1.55 m)		Duxbury, Massachusetts	Duxbury HS
6		Cassandra Hanlon	Freshman	D			Rowley, Massachusetts	Governor's Academy
7		Elizabeth Johnson	Sophomore	D	5' 5" (1.65 m)		Milton, Massachusetts	Milton HS
8		Erin Sullivan	Freshman	F			Dennisport, Massachusetts	Nauset Regional HS
9		Brittany Smith	Freshman	F			Manchester, Massachusetts	Marblehead HS
10		Julie Dobiac	Junior	D	5' 6" (1.68 m)		Pulaski, New York	Ontario Hockey Academy
11		Taylor Moreland	Freshman	F			Pleasant Prairie, Wisconsin	Milwaukee Jr. Admirals
12		Amy Varano	Sophomore	D	5' 5" (1.65 m)		Duxbury, Massachusetts	Notre Dame Academy
13		Megan Finlay	Sophomore	F	5' 8" (1.73 m)		Cumberland, Maine	Greely HS
14		Heather Daley	Junior	F	5' 5" (1.65 m)		Brewster, New York	Brewster Academy
15		Julia Consorti	Sophomore	F	5' 5" (1.65 m)		West Haven, Connecticut	West Haven HS
16		Natasha Klinoff (C)	Senior	F	5' 4" (1.63 m)		Concord, Massachusetts	Southfield School
18		Casey Stathopoulos (A)	Senior	F	5' 2" (1.57 m)		Waltham, Massachusetts	Southfield School
19		Megan Offner	Junior	D	5' 8" (1.73 m)		Hamilton, New York	Princeton Day School
20		Alex Davis	Senior	F	5' 6" (1.68 m)		Pembroke, Massachusetts	Pembroke HS
21		Teagan Ketchum	Sophomore	D	5' 4" (1.63 m)		Averill Park, New York	Albany Academy
22		Elizabeth Collins	Freshman	F			Duxbury, Massachusetts	Duxbury HS
24		Emily Falvey	Sophomore	F			Hingham, Massachusetts	Hingham HS
25		Duggan Delano	Freshman	F			Billerica, Massachusetts	Arlington Catholic HS
26		Sarah Walewski	Freshman	F	5' 5" (1.65 m)		Shelton, Connecticut	St. Joseph Academy
27		Carley Radovich	Freshman	F			Milford, Massachusetts	Vermont Academy
28		Hannah Skelly	Junior	F	5' 6" (1.68 m)		Wolfeboro, New Hampshire	Brewster Academy
29		Kathryn Darling	Freshman	F			Vestal, New York	Nichols School
30		Devan Kane	Freshman	G			Scarborough, Maine	Scarborough HS
31		Amanda Fontaine	Junior	G	5' 3" (1.6 m)		Northfield, Massachusetts	Northfield Mount Hermon HS
33		Nicole Magee	Junior	G	5' 6" (1.68 m)		Burlington, Massachusetts	New Hampton School

== Schedule ==
Date	Opponent^{#}	Rank^{#}	Site	Decision	Result	Record
Regular Season
October 31	at Holy Cross*		Hart Center • Worcester, MA	Amanda Fontaine	L 4–5	0–1–0
November 1	at Holy Cross*		Hart Center • Worcester, MA	Amanda Fontaine	L 0–5	0–2–0
November 14	Canton*		Sports Center of Connecticut • Shelton, CT	Amanda Fontaine	W 4–0	1–2–0
November 15	Canton*		Sports Center of Connecticut • Shelton, CT	Nicole Magee	W 6–3	2–2–0
November 21	at Yale*		Ingalls Rink • New Haven, CT	Amanda Fontaine	L 0–13	2–3–0
November 25	Wesleyan*		Sports Center of Connecticut • Shelton, CT	Amanda Fontaine	L 3–4	2–4–0
December 5	at Franklin Pierce*		Jason Ritchie Ice Arena • Winchendon, MA	Amanda Fontaine	L 1–6	2–5–0
December 6	Franklin Pierce*		Sports Center of Connecticut • Shelton, CT	Amanda Fontaine	W 3–1	3–5–0
January 3, 2015	St. Anselm*		Sports Center of Connecticut • Shelton, CT	Amanda Fontaine	L 2–6	3–6–0
January 4	St. Michael's*		Sports Center of Connecticut • Shelton, CT	Amanda Fontaine	W 6–3	4–6–0
January 6	at Southern Maine*		USM Ice Arena • Gorham, ME	Amanda Fontaine	W 4–2	5–6–0
January 7	at Southern Maine*		USM Ice Arena • Gorham, ME	Nicole Magee	L 1–2	5–7–0
January 9	at University of New England*		Harold Alfond Forum • Biddeford, ME	Amanda Fontaine	T 1–1 ^{OT}	5–7–1
January 10	at University of New England*		Harold Alfond Forum • Biddeford, ME	Nicole Magee	L 0–1	5–8–1
January 13	at Wesleyan*		Spurrier-Snyder Rink • Middletown, CT	Amanda Fontaine	L 0–1	5–9–1
January 16	at Trinity*		Koeppel Community Sports Center • Hartford, CT	Amanda Fontaine	L 0–9	5–10–1
January 17	Trinity*		Sports Center of Connecticut • Shelton, CT	Amanda Fontaine	L 1–5	5–11–1
January 23	Stevenson*		Sports Center of Connecticut • Shelton, CT	Amanda Fontaine	L 2–5	5–12–1
January 24	Stevenson*		Sports Center of Connecticut • Shelton, CT	Nicole Magee	L 1–6	5–13–1
January 30	at William Smith*		The Cooler • Geneva, NY	Nicole Magee	W 5–1	6–13–1
January 31	at William Smith*		The Cooler • Geneva, NY	Nicole Magee	W 4–3	7–13–1
February 6	at Stevenson*		Reistertown Sportsplex • Reistertown, MD	Nicole Magee	L 2–6	7–14–1
February 7	at Stevenson*		Reisertown Sportsplex • Reisertown, MD	Amanda Fontaine	T 2–2 ^{OT}	7–14–2
February 10	at Williams*		Towne Field House • Williamstown, MA	Amanda Fontaine	T 2–2 ^{OT}	7–14–3
ECAC Div III Open
February 25	at Williams*		Hart Center • Worcester, MA	Amanda Fontaine	L 1–4	7–15–3
*Non-conference game. ^{#}Rankings from USCHO.com Poll.
