= 2014–15 Yale Bulldogs women's ice hockey season =

- Conference: 7th ECAC Hockey
- Home ice: Ingalls Rink

Record
- Overall: 15-15-1
- Home: 9-5-1
- Road: 6-8-0
- Neutral: 0-2-0

Coaches and captains
- Head coach: Joakim Flygh
- Assistant coaches: Chris Ardito; Jessica Koizumi
- Captain: Aurora Kennedy

The Yale Bulldogs represented Yale University in ECAC women's ice hockey during the 2014–15 NCAA Division I women's ice hockey season. The Bulldogs were defeated by Harvard in the ECAC quarterfinals.

== Offseason ==
- July 10:Hanna Åström was invited to a second National Team camp for Sweden.
- August 3: Jaimie Leonoff and Eden Murray were invited to Team Canada'a Development camp in Calgary.

=== Recruiting ===
Player	Position	Nationality	Notes
Kara Drexler	Defense	United States	played for the Anaheim Lady Ducks
Kaitlin Gately	Forward	United States	Played with Assabet Valley
Emily Monaghan	Forward	Canada	Attended Edge School with Eden Murray
Eden Murray	Forward	Canada	Younger sister of Sr. Defense Madi Murray
Courtney Pensavalle	Forward	United States	Played for Team Pittsburgh
Mallory Souliotis	Defense	United States	On Assabet Valley team with Kaitlin Gately
Brittany Wheeler	Forward	United States	Attended Benilde-St, Margaret's
Grace Wickens	Defense	Canada	Played with Toronto Jr. Aeros

== MD Mafuj Alam Sama hayat Ali khan ==
No.	Nat.	Player	Class	Pos	Height	DoB	Hometown	Previous team
2		Kara Drexler	Freshman	D	5' 4" (1.63 m)		Manhattan Beach, California	Anaheim Lady Ducks
4		Emily Monaghan	Freshman	F	5' 7" (1.7 m)		Calgary, Alberta	Edge School
5		Jackie Raines	Senior	F	5' 4" (1.63 m)		London, Ontario	London Jr. Devilettes
6		Stephanie Mock	Senior	F	5' 4" (1.63 m)		Cape Coral, Florida	Team USA U18
7		Abby Gahm	Sophomore	F/D	5' 4" (1.63 m)		Eagle River, Alaska	Brewster Academy
8		Eden Murray	Freshman	F	5' 4" (1.63 m)		Medicine Hat, Alberta	Edge School
9		Gretchen Tarrant	Sophomore	F	5' 7" (1.7 m)		Colchester, Vermont	Rice Memorial
10		Jaimie Haddad	Junior	F	5' 7" (1.7 m)		Wilbraham, Massachusetts	Assabet Valley
12		Janelle Ferrara	Junior	D	5' 6" (1.68 m)		Winthrop, Massachusetts	Assabet Valley
14		Mallory Souliotis	Freshman	D	5' 5" (1.65 m)		Acton, Massachusetts	Assabet Valley
18		Hanna Åström	Junior	F	5' 9" (1.75 m)		Örnsköldsvik, Sweden	Swedish National Team
19		Courtney Pensavalle	Freshman	F	5' 9" (1.75 m)		Winchester, Massachusetts	Team Pittsburgh
20		Kaitlin Gately	Freshman	F	5' 4" (1.63 m)		Hingham, Massachusetts	Assabet Valley
21		Brittany Wheeler	Freshman	F	5' 6" (1.68 m)		Maple Grove, Minnesota	Benilde-St. Margaret's
22		Madi Murray	Senior	D	5' 6" (1.68 m)		Medicine Hat, Alberta	Edge School
23		Aurora Kennedy (C)	Senior	D	5' 8.5" (1.74 m)		Mississauga, Ontario	Toronto Jr. Aeros
24		Grace Wickens	Freshman	D	5' 8" (1.73 m)		Ham Lake, Minnesota	Toronto Jr. Aeros
25		Kate Martini	Junior	D	5' 6" (1.68 m)		King City, Ontario	Toronto Jr. Aeros
29		Hanna Mandl	Sophomore	G	5' 6" (1.68 m)		Nobleton, Ontario	Brampton Jr. Thunder
32		Jaimie Leonoff	Senior	G	5' 7" (1.7 m)		Montreal, Quebec	Detroit Belle Tire
35		Rachelle Graham	Junior	G	5' 10" (1.78 m)		Sault Ste. Marie, Ontario	Sault Ste. Marie Wildcats
44		Taylor Marchin	Sophomore	D	5' 7" (1.7 m)		Algonac, Michigan	Assabet Valley
88		Phoebe Staenz	Sophomore	F	5' 4" (1.63 m)		Zürich, Switzerland	Swiss National Team
95		Krista Yip-Chuk	Sophomore	F	5' 5" (1.65 m)		Whitby, Ontario	Whitby Jr. Wolves

== Schedule ==
Date	Opponent^{#}	Rank^{#}	Site	Decision	Result	Record
Regular Season
October 24	at Providence*		Schneider Arena • Providence, RI	Jaimie Leonoff	W 6–2	1–0–0
October 25	Providence*		Ingalls Rink • New Haven, CT	Jaimie Leonoff	W 5–2	2–0–0
October 31	St. Lawrence		Ingalls Rink • New Haven, CT	Jaimie Leonoff	L 0–3	2–1–0 (0–1–0)
November 1	#9 Clarkson		Ingalls Rink • New Haven, CT	Jaimie Leonoff	L 1–2	2–2–0 (0–2–0)
November 8	#6 Boston University*		Ingalls Rink • New Haven, CT	Jaimie Leonoff	T 4–4 ^{OT}	2–2–1
November 14	at Colgate		Starr Rink • Hamilton, NY	Jaimie Leonoff	W 3–0	3–2–1 (1–2–0)
November 15	at Cornell		Lynah Rink • Ithaca, NY	Jaimie Leonoff	L 2–6	3–3–1 (1–3–0)
November 21	Sacred Heart*		Ingalls Rink • New Haven, CT	Hannah Mandl	W 13–0	4–3–1
November 25	#1 Boston College*		Ingalls Rink • New Haven, CT	Jaimie Leonoff	L 0–4	4–4–1
November 28	vs. #4 Quinnipiac*		Freitas Ice Forum • Storrs, CT (Nutmeg Classic, Opening Round)	Jaimie Leonoff	L 2–5	4–5–1
November 29	at Connecticut*		Freitas Ice Forum • Storrs, CT (Nutmeg Classic, Consolation round)	Hannah Mandl	L 1–3	4–6–1
December 5	at Union		Achilles Center • Schenectady, NY	Jaimie Leonoff	W 4–2	5–6–1 (2–3–0)
December 6	at Rensselaer		Houston Field House • Troy, NY	Jaimie Leonoff	W 3–2	6–6–1 (3–3–0)
January 2, 2015	Dartmouth		Ingalls Rink • New Haven, CT	Jaimie Leonoff	W 5–1	7–6–1 (4–3–0)
January 3	#6 Harvard		Ingalls Rink • New Haven, CT	Jaimie Leonoff	L 1–3	7–7–1 (4–4–0)
January 9	at Princeton		Hobey Baker Memorial Rink • Princeton, NJ	Jaimie Leonoff	L 1–4	7–8–1 (4–5–0)
January 10	at Quinnipiac		TD Bank Sports Center • Hamden, CT	Jaimie Leonoff	L 1–4	7–9–1 (4–6–0)
January 16	Cornell		Ingalls Rink • New Haven, CT	Jaimie Leonoff	L 0–2	7–10–1 (4–7–0)
January 17	Colgate		Ingalls Rink • New Haven, CT	Jaimie Leonoff	W 5–1	8–10–1 (5–7–0)
January 23	at Brown		Meehan Auditorium • Providence, RI	Jaimie Leonoff	L 2–3 ^{OT}	8–11–1 (5–8–0)
January 24	Brown		Ingalls Rink • New Haven, CT	Hannah Mandl	W 6–3	9–11–1 (6–8–0)
January 30	at #8 Clarkson		Cheel Arena • Potsdam, NY	Jaimie Leonoff	W 3–2	10–11–1 (7–8–0)
January 31	at #10 St. Lawrence		Appleton Arena • Canton, NY	Jaimie Leonoff	L 3–4	10–12–1 (7–9–0)
February 6	at #4 Harvard		Bright-Landry Hockey Center • Allston, MA	Jaimie Leonoff	L 1–6	10–13–1 (7–10–0)
February 6	at Dartmouth		Thompson Arena • Hanover, NH	Jaimie Leonoff	W 6–2	11–13–1 (8–10–0)
February 13	Rensselaer		Ingalls Rink • New Haven, CT	Jaimie Leonoff	W 5–0	12–13–1 (9–10–0)
February 14	Union		Ingalls Rink • New Haven, CT	Jaimie Leonoff	W 4–2	13–13–1 (10–10–0)
February 20	#5 Quinnipiac		Ingalls Rink • New Haven, CT	Jaimie Leonoff	W 3–0	14–13–1 (11–10–0)
February 21	Princeton		Ingalls Rink • New Haven, CT	Jaimie Leonoff	W 2–1	15–13–1 (12–10–0)
ECAC Tournament
February 27	at #4 Harvard*		Bright-Landry Hockey Center • Allston, MA (Quarterfinals, Game 1)	Jaimie Leonoff	L 0–7	15–14–1
February 28	at #4 Harvard*		Bright-Landry Hockey Center • Allston, MA (Quarterfinals, Game 2)	Jaimie Leonoff	L 0–2	15–15–1
*Non-conference game. ^{#}Rankings from USCHO.com Poll.
