= Ontario Tech Ridgebacks =

Athletic teams representing Ontario Tech University

- University: Ontario Tech University
- Association: U Sports
- Conference: Ontario University Athletics
- Athletic director: Audra Sherman
- Location: Oshawa, Ontario
- Varsity teams: 16 (8 men's, 8 women's)
- Basketball arena: Recreation and Wellness Centre
- Ice hockey arena: Ice Centre
- Soccer stadium: Vaso's Field
- Lacrosse stadium: Vaso's Field
- Golf course: Oshawa Golf and Curling Club
- Rowing venue: Durham Rowing Club
- Colours: Dark blue, light blue, orange
- Mascot: Hunter the Ridgeback
- Website: goridgebacks.com
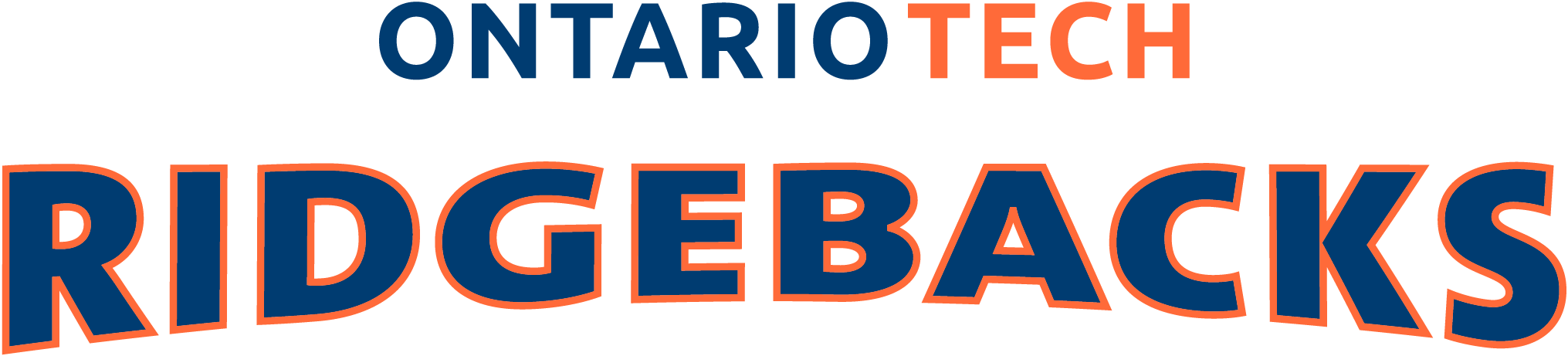

The Ontario Tech Ridgebacks are the athletic teams that represent Ontario Tech University in Oshawa, Ontario, Canada. The Ridgebacks have been competing in Ontario University Athletics since 2006 and have been a member of U Sports since 2008.

The Ontario Tech Ridgebacks compete in badminton, soccer, women's lacrosse, curling, golf, rowing, Volleyball, basketball, and hockey. Formerly, the Ridgebacks had a tennis program. However, in 2016 after 10 seasons the university decided to eliminate the tennis program in favour of creating a badminton program.

== Varsity sports ==
Men's sports	Women's sports
Badminton	Badminton
Basketball	Basketball
Curling	Curling
Golf	Golf
Ice hockey	Ice hockey
Lacrosse	Lacrosse
Rowing	Rowing
Soccer	Soccer

=== Badminton ===
Announced in 2016, in conjunction with the elimination of the Tennis program, the university created and began the Badminton program. The inaugural coach for the introduction of the program is Wayne King, a decorated OUA badminton coach with years of experience with the University of Toronto badminton program.

=== Men's ice hockey ===
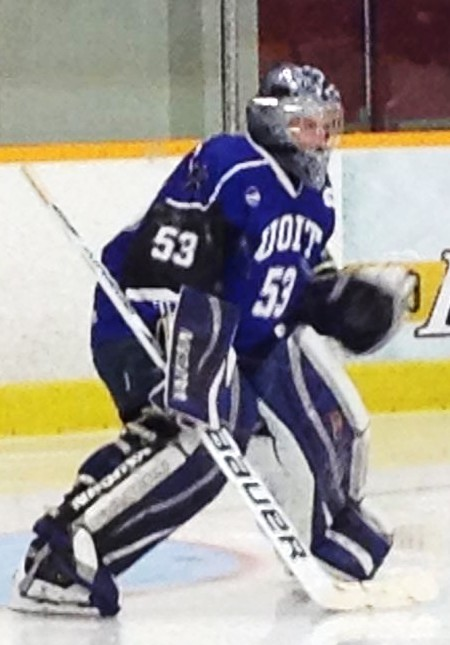
Ridgebacks' goalie Jesse Raymond ready for a face-off (September 2013)

The current head coach of the men's ice hockey team is Curtis Hodgins. The coaching staff includes James Thompson (assistant), Rob Powers (assistant), Dave Kennedy (goalie coach), and Cameron Bickle (video coach). Other staff include Frank Robinson (scouting).

Hodgins took the role leaving the Cobourg Cougars (OJHL Junior A) mid-season in 2015–16 to take over from former head coach Craig Fisher, who resigned due to medical concerns. Craig Fisher, whose hiring was announced two weeks before the start of the 2013–14 OUA playoffs, was the result of the university's search for new direction after the disappointment of recent seasons; placing emphasis on improving academics, and team culture.

=== Women's ice hockey ===
The current head coach of the women's ice hockey team is Kassidy Nabouris. A former player for the program, she ranks second all-time in scoring with 92 points.

== Logo and mascot ==
Ontario Tech's athletic team colours are blue and orange.

The university's mascot and logo is based on a Rhodesian Ridgeback breed of dog. From the Ridgebacks' website, 2013:

“[The Rhodesian Ridgeback] is a large and well muscled hunting dog that is legendary for its ability and use in hunting down lions. Strong and extremely competitive by nature, the Ridgeback is also lightning quick and deftly alert while constantly paying attention to its surroundings. Known as a dominant dog with aggressive instincts, the Ridgeback moves, not only like a hunting dog, but like a dog of prey. It is strong willed and confident and thrives on vigorous exercise and athletic activities. It is equally as tough in the water as it is on land.”
