= Meghann Treacy =

American ice hockey player and coach (born 1993)

- Born: June 5, 1993 (age 33) Lake Peekskill, New York
- Position: Goaltender
- NCAA team: Maine Black Bears
- Playing career: 2012–2016

Meghann Treacy (born June 5, 1993) is an assistant coach for Colby College, who is best known for her all-star goaltending for the University of Maine Black Bears women's team from the 2012–13 season to 2015–16. She was a Hockey East First Team All-Star in the 2014–15 season. Prior to her college career, Treacy played ice hockey, lacrosse and field hockey at Williston Northampton School.

== NCAA ==
Season	Team	League	GP	MIN	GA	SV	Shots	SV %	GAA	W	L	T
2012-13	Maine Black Bears	NCAA	10	443:10	28	232	260	.892	3.79	0	5	1
2013-14	Maine Black Bears	NCAA	27	1561:58	79	768	847	.907	3.03	5	18	4
2014-15	Maine Black Bears	NCAA	29	1718:26	69	921	990	.930	2.41	9	18	2
2015-16	Maine Black Bears	NCAA	33	1797:24	79	927	1006	.921	2.64	9	20	2
NCAA Totals			99	5520:58	255	2848	3103	.918	2.77	23	61	9

Statistics source
