= Craig Fisher =

Canadian ice hockey player (born 1970)

- Born: June 30, 1970 (age 56) Oshawa, Ontario, Canada
- Height: 6 ft 3 in (191 cm)
- Weight: 180 lb (82 kg; 12 st 12 lb)
- Position: Left wing
- Shot: Left
- Played for: Philadelphia Flyers; Winnipeg Jets; Florida Panthers
- NHL draft: 56th overall, 1988; Philadelphia Flyers
- Playing career: 1990–1999

Craig Fisher (born June 30, 1970) is a Canadian former professional ice hockey player who currently works in the athletic administration for Ontario Tech University (UOIT), having previously served as the head coach of the UOIT hockey team.

Fisher grew up in Whitby, Ontario, where he and brother Mark played junior hockey. Mark and Craig both played for the Oshawa Legionaires of the Ontario Junior Hockey League. Mark would go on to play for McGill University, while Craig played US college hockey at Miami University.

Craig thrived at Miami, with 42 points (22 goals, 20 assists) in his 1988–89 freshman season, earning First-Team All-Rookie Central Collegiate Hockey Association (CCHA) honors, and then producing 66 points (37 goals, 29 assists) in his sophomore season, named to the First-Team All-CCHA Team for 1989–90. Fisher had been drafted 56th overall in the 1988 NHL entry draft by the Philadelphia Flyers and turned pro at the end of the 1989–90 collegiate season. Fisher finished the season with Miami on March 3, 1990, and made his NHL debut with Philadelphia some three weeks later, on March 27.

A prolific scorer, Fisher played 12 NHL games with the Flyers, Winnipeg Jets, and Florida Panthers, but spent much of his career playing for various American Hockey League (AHL) and International Hockey League (IHL) teams. Fisher was part of the AHL championship Cape Breton Oilers, winning the Calder Cup in 1993. He then led the IHL in goals scored (74) in 1995–96 while playing for the Orlando Solar Bears.

In 1999, while playing for the Rochester Americans, Fisher suffered a violent collision, knocked unconscious and hitting his head on the ice. His playing career would come to an end as a result of this traumatic brain injury. Fisher would move into coaching, eventually becoming the head coach for the Whitby Fury, leading the team to a 31–19 (.609) record in 2012–13 and a 35–14 (.698) season in 2013–14. He suffered another concussion behind the bench with Whitby in 2013, missing extensive time with the team as a result. Having previously served at Ontario Tech as an assistant coach, Fisher was named as the head coach of the Ridgebacks in 2014, but was forced to resign shortly afterwards due to ongoing concussion symptoms.

Fisher lives in Whitby with his family and works for Ontario Tech as an athletic advisor, working to raise awareness of concussions in hockey and counseling athletes in dealing with concussion and TBI symptoms.

== Career statistics ==
=== Regular season and playoffs ===
			Regular season					Playoffs
Season	Team	League	GP	G	A	Pts	PIM	GP	G	A	Pts	PIM
1986–87	Oshawa Legionaires	MJBHL	34	22	26	48	18	—	—	—	—	—
1987–88	Oshawa Legionaires	MJBHL	36	42	34	76	48	—	—	—	—	—
1988–89	Miami University	CCHA	37	22	20	42	37	—	—	—	—	—
1989–90	Miami University	CCHA	39	37	29	66	38	—	—	—	—	—
1989–90	Philadelphia Flyers	NHL	2	0	0	0	0	—	—	—	—	—
1990–91	Philadelphia Flyers	NHL	2	0	0	0	0	—	—	—	—	—
1990–91	Hershey Bears	AHL	77	43	36	79	46	7	5	3	8	2
1991–92	Cape Breton Oilers	AHL	60	20	25	45	28	1	0	0	0	0
1992–93	Cape Breton Oilers	AHL	75	32	29	61	74	1	0	0	0	2
1993–94	Winnipeg Jets	NHL	4	0	0	0	2	—	—	—	—	—
1993–94	Cape Breton Oilers	AHL	16	5	5	10	11	—	—	—	—	—
1993–94	Moncton Hawks	AHL	46	26	35	61	36	21	11	11	22	28
1994–95	Indianapolis Ice	IHL	77	53	40	93	65	—	—	—	—	—
1995–96	Orlando Solar Bears	IHL	82	74	56	130	81	14	10	7	17	6
1996–97	Florida Panthers	NHL	4	0	0	0	0	—	—	—	—	—
1996–97	Utah Grizzlies	IHL	15	6	7	13	4	—	—	—	—	—
1996–97	Carolina Monarchs	AHL	42	33	29	62	16	—	—	—	—	—
1997–98	Kölner Haie	DEL	35	9	8	17	36	—	—	—	—	—
1998–99	Rochester Americans	AHL	70	29	52	81	28	20	9	11	20	10
1999–00	Rochester Americans	AHL	17	15	8	23	8	—	—	—	—	—
AHL totals			403	203	219	422	247	50	25	25	50	42
NHL totals			12	0	0	0	0	—	—	—	—	—

== Awards and honours ==
Award	Year
All-CCHA Rookie Team	1988-89
All-CCHA First Team	1989-90
