= Ontario Tech Ridgebacks women's ice hockey =

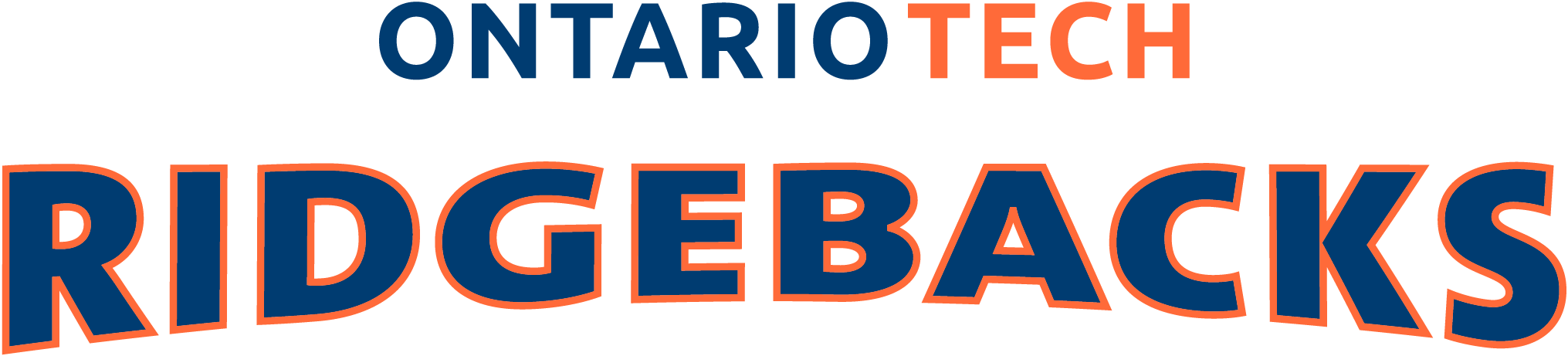
- University: Ontario Tech University
- Conference: OUA; OUA East Division
- First season: 2007-08
- Head coach: Kassidy Nauboris; 2nd season, 9–17–0
- Assistant coaches: Tom St. James; Megan Pardy; Carson Bird
- Arena: Campus Ice Centre; Oshawa, Ontario
- Colors: Blue, Light Blue, and Orange

The Ontario Tech Ridgebacks women's ice hockey team is an active ice hockey program representing the Ontario Tech Ridgebacks athletic department of the Ontario Tech University. The program is a member of Ontario University Athletics, participanting in the East division. Currently serving as head coach, Kassidy Nauboris is the first Ontario Tech graduate to serve in this role with a Ridgebacks team.

== History ==
The Ridgebacks debuted in U Sports ice hockey during the 2007–08 season. Recording only one regulation win, compared to 24 regulation losses, their mark in overtime involved two wins and two losses.

Former Winter Games medalist Karen Nystrom joined the Ridgebacks as head coach in 2009, replacing Gary Pitcher. Amassing 52 regulation wins during her six seasons there, Nystrom led the program to their first double digit win season during 2011–12.

Under Nystrom's tutelage, the Ridgebacks enjoyed consecutive appearances in the OUA playoffs, a program first. Both postseason berths (2013 and 2014) ended in first round exits.

Inheriting the head coaching duties from Nystrom, Justin Caruana served in the role until 2024. Leading the Ridgebacks to the 2022 OUA Playoffs, the result was another first round exit, eliminated on home ice versus the Queen's Golden Gaels.

== Players ==
=== All-time stat leaders ===
Player Name	Pos.	Games	Goals	Assists	Points
Jill Morillo	F	130	64	47	111
Kassidy Nauboris	F		46	46	92
Sarah Worthington	F		38	45	83
Chelsea Ball	F		37	37	74
Jaclyn Gibson	F	125			63
Mikaeli Cavell	F	120	18	42	60
Samantha Forchielli			28	29	57

== Awards and honours ==
- 2018-19 OUA assists leader - Kassidy Nauboris (17 assists)
- 2021-22 OUA Most Sportsmanlike Award - Megan Johnson
- 2024-25 OUA leading goal scorer - Julia Jackson (14 goals)

=== OUA All-Rookie ===
- 2009-10 All-Rookie Team selection: Jill Morillo
- 2018-19 All-Rookie Team selection: Erin Ross
- 2021-22 OUA All-Rookie Team - Zoe McGee, Goaltender

=== OUA All-stars ===
- 2016-17 Second Team All-Star: Kassidy Nauboris
- 2018-19 First Team All-Star: Kassidy Nauboris
- 2021-22 Second Team All-Star: Brooke Vial
- 2021-22 Second Team All-Star: Natalie Wozney
- 2024-25 First Team All-Star: Julia Jackson

=== USports honors ===
- 2011 Academic All-Canadian: Jill Morillo
- 2012 CIS Marion Hilliard Award: Jill Morillo
- 2012 Second Team All-Canadian: Jill Morillo
- 2022-23 USports Academic All-Canadian: Kayla Welk

=== University honors ===
- 2024-25 Ontario Tech Female Athlete of the Year: Julia Jackson
- 2010-11 James Baun Cup: Jill Morillo
- 2024-25 James Baun Cup: Kayla Welk

== International ==
- Kassidy Nauboris Canada: 2019 Winter Universiade (silver)

== Ridgebacks in Pro Hockey ==
Player Name	Team	League	Season(s)	Notes
Victoria MacKenzie	Toronto Furies	CWHL	2016–17	Appeared in 2 regular season games
Chelsea Ball	MAC Budapest	EWHL	2019–20	Amassed 20 regular season points
Kassidy Nauboris	MAC Budapest	EWHL	2019–20	Amassed 23 regular season points
Natasha Tymcio	MAC Budapest	EWHL	2019–20	Appeared in 18 regular season games

NOTE: In the 2016 CWHL Draft, Victoria MacKenzie and Jaclyn Gibson were both selected by the Toronto Furies. MacKenzie was a 10th round selection while Gibson was selected in the 12th round.

== See also ==
- Ontario Tech Ridgebacks men's ice hockey
- U Sports women's ice hockey
