= Shannon MacAulay =

Canadian ice hockey player

- Born: June 22, 1994 (age 31) Charlottetown, PEI, Canada
- Height: 5 ft 11 in (180 cm)
- Weight: 176 lb (80 kg; 12 st 8 lb)
- Position: Forward
- Shoots: Left
- NCAA team: Clarkson Golden Knights
- National team: Canada
- Playing career: 2009–present

Shannon MacAulay
Medal record

Women's ice hockey

Representing Canada

Nations Cup
Gold medal – first place	2015 Germany	2015 Tournament

Shannon MacAulay (born June 22, 1994) is a women's ice hockey player that played for the Canadian Under 18 women's team in a three-game exhibit versus the United States in August 2011. She was the only player from Prince Edward Island on the roster.

She represented Prince Edward Island at the 2011 Canada Winter Games and finished in seventh place. MacAulay was accepted by the Clarkson Golden Knights women's ice hockey program in Potsdam, New York, after 33 schools showed interest. In 2014, she would score the game-winning goal that would help Clarkson win their first-ever Frozen Four championship. Of note, it was the first national championship in the history of Clarkson athletics. Also, Clarkson was the first top-level NCAA women's hockey champion from a conference other than the Western Collegiate Hockey Association.

== Playing career ==
MacAulay participated in hockey since the age of six, playing on AAA boys teams until the age of 13. In 2005, MacAulay played for P.E.I. at the Quebec International Peewee Tournament. During the 2005–06 season, MacAulay captained the P.E.I. Young Islanders. With the Warner School, she won a silver medal at the JWHL Challenge Cup. In addition, she competed for Team Atlantic at the 2009 National Women's Under-18 championship in Surrey, B.C., and was part of a sixth-place finish.

=== NCAA ===
On January 16, 2012, it was announced that MacAulay committed to join the Clarkson Golden Knights women's ice hockey program in autumn 2012. Her first NCAA assist and NCAA goal occurred in the same contest, a 5–1 win versus the Vermont Catamounts on October 13, 2012. During the 2014–15 Clarkson Golden Knights women's ice hockey season, MacAulay was named team captain. Of note, she would log a career high in points (33) and power play goals (5) during said season.

=== Hockey Canada ===
She was a member of Canada's National Women's Development Team that won a gold medal at the 2015 Nations Cup (formerly known as the Meco Cup).

=== NWHL ===
In the 2015 NWHL Draft, she was a fifth-round selection of the Boston Pride

== Career stats ==
=== Hockey Canada ===
Year	Event	GP	G	A	PTS	PIM
2009	National Under 18	4	0	2	2	2
2011	Canada Winter Games	7	3	0	3	2
2014	Exhibition vs US U-22	3	1	1	2	2
2015	Nations Cup	3	0	0	0	0

=== NCAA ===
Season	GP	G	A	Pts	PIM	PPG	SHG	GWG
2012-13	38	9	7	16	36	2	0	1
2013-14	39	13	11	24	38	5	0	3
2014-15	38	16	17	33	40	5	0	4

=== Other ===
Year	Team	GP	G	A	PTS	PIM
2010-11	Warner School	23	9	8	17	16

== Awards and honours ==
- Top Forward, 2011 Canadian National Women's Under-18 Championships

== Personal ==
In 1987, her grandfather, Wilfred Shephard, was inducted into the P.E.I. Sports Hall of Fame for baseball.
