= Chelsey Goldberg =

American ice hockey player (born 1993)

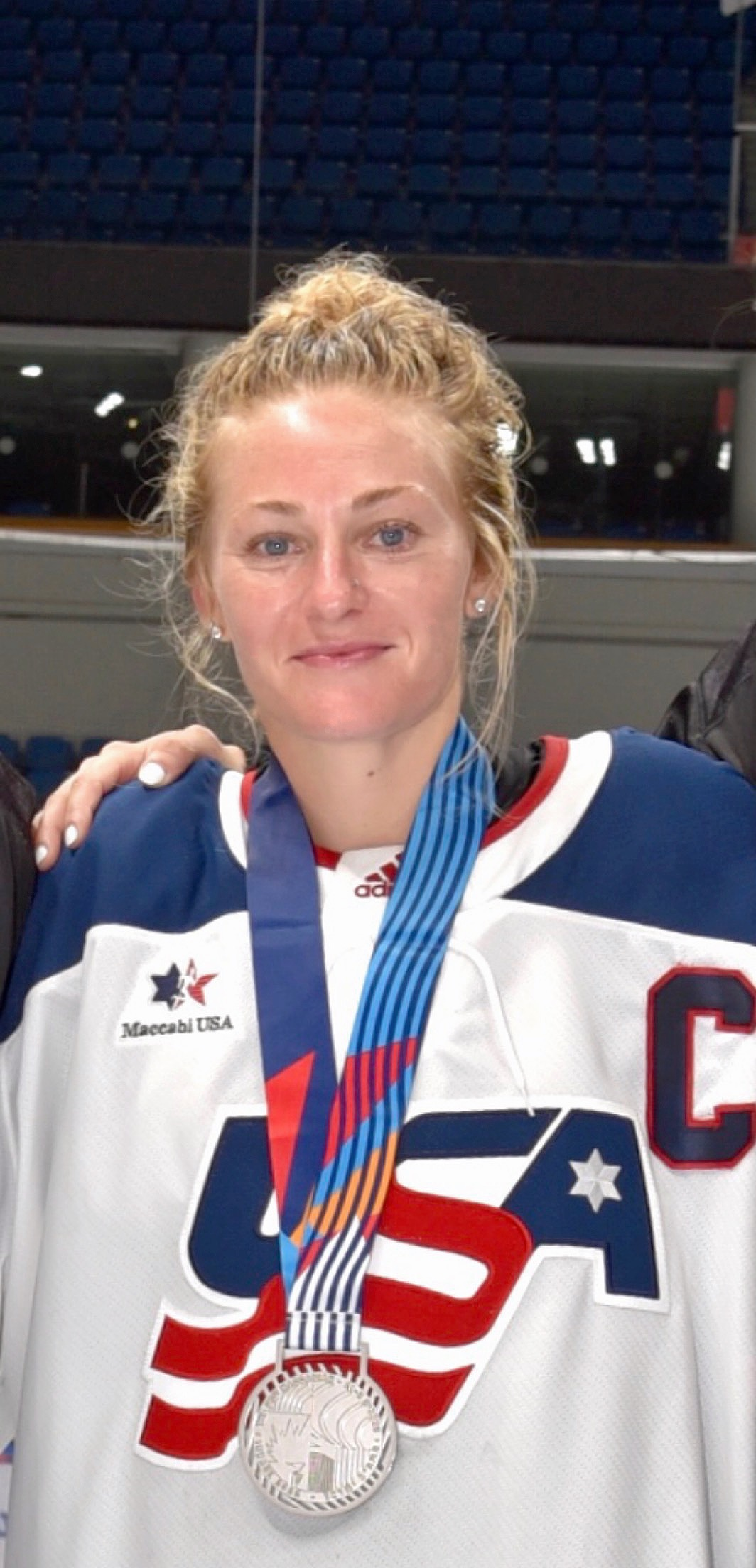
- Goldberg in 2022
- Born: January 30, 1993 (age 33) Agoura Hills, California, U.S.
- Height: 5 ft 5 in (165 cm)
- Weight: 144 lb (65 kg; 10 st 4 lb)
- Position: Forward
- Shoots: Right
- PWHPA team Former teams: Minnesota; Boston Blades (CWHL)
- Playing career: 2016–present

Chelsey Goldberg (born January 30, 1993) is an American ice hockey player who currently plays for Team Adidas in the Professional Women's Hockey Players Association (PWHPA). Previously, Goldberg had signed with the Boston Blades in the Canadian Women's Hockey League (CWHL), where she began her professional career before the league folded and formed the PWHPA. Prior to her professional career, Goldberg played four seasons for the Northeastern University Huskies women's ice hockey team. She is going into her 7th season professionally, and is currently resides in Los Angeles, California working as a hockey ambassador where she hopes to grow women's ice hockey in Los Angeles and along the West Coast.

== Early life ==
Goldberg was raised in Agoura Hills, California, and is Jewish. She attended and graduated from Agoura High School, where she played lacrosse for three years. Goldberg started playing roller hockey when she was 10 and eventually switched to ice hockey at age 12. She played boys ice hockey, with her twin brother, for the Ventura Mariners and L.A. Selects before she moved to Vermont for her last two years of high school. Prior to attending university, she played competitive hockey at North American Hockey Academy in Stowe, Vermont, as part of the Junior Women's Hockey League, where she was named to the 2011 All Star team. In 2010, she broke her right fibula in competition, and then a year later in 2011 she broke her left fibula in competition. This required a surgical procedure, which resulted in five screws and plate.

== University career ==
Goldberg played as a forward for the Northeastern University Huskies women's ice hockey team over four seasons, beginning with the 2011–12 season, winning a Beanpot championship in two of them. In her sophomore year she needed surgery to remove five screws and a plate from her left fibula that were causing nerve pain. During her college days she competed in 90 games in the Women's Hockey East Association of NCAA Division I. Goldberg was out for four years, but her first game back her junior year, scored two shorthanded goals against RIT. She was named to the 2012-13 Hockey East All-Academic Team, and named WHEA Co-Player of the Week on October 7, 2013. There she also served as a member of the Student-Athlete Advisory Committee, where she was eventually elected the group's president and acted as an ambassador of the program. As President of the Student Athletic Advisory Committee, Goldberg ensured that the student athletes at Northeastern University were given opportunity to participate in community service work in the community and be a voice for any requests that the student athletes had. In 2014 and 2015, Goldberg had pitched the idea to take community service globally, and partnered with True Start Athletics. She raised enough money for herself and her vice president to travel to Kenya for two weeks and donate school supplies, sports equipment, and clothes to six different schools across three different regions. Goldberg graduated from undergrad in 2015 with a Bachelor of Arts degree in Human Services (counseling & therapy), concentration in psychology, with a health science minor. She continued on to receive her Masters of Arts degree in Professional Studies, concentration in Sports leadership/Management from Northeastern University in 2018. Since she graduated she had been working in Commercial Real Estate in Boston, Massachusetts while playing professional women's ice hockey.

== Professional career ==
In August 2016 Goldberg was drafted sixth overall by the Boston Blades of the Canadian Women's Hockey League (CWHL). The chief scout of the team said that she would have been drafted a year prior, but for a series of injuries that Goldberg suffered during her career—including two broken legs. Goldberg scored her first CWHL goal in her second game, playing against Les Canadiennes de Montreal. The CWHL folded in 2019, resulting in 200+ of the best women's ice hockey players coming together to create the PWHPA to fight for a sustainable professional women's hockey league. She then later joined Team Women's Sports Foundation, part of the New England region and Team Adidas of the PWHPA. Goldberg is going into season four with the PWHPA, most recently playing for Team Adidas out of Minnesota.

== International career ==
From 2013 to 2021, Goldberg had been working to get women's ice hockey to the Maccabiah Games, played in Israel every four years. After her twin brother, Chad Goldberg, had made the 2013 and 2017 men's ice hockey roster, Goldberg was determined to create a women's division. In July 2022, women's ice hockey was played at the Maccabi Games in Jerusalem. Goldberg represented the United States of America and was captain of Team USA. Goldberg helped take the team to win silver medal at the 2022 Maccabi Games.

== Awards and honors ==
- Goldberg was inducted into the Southern California Jewish Sports Hall of Fame in 2020.
- Hockey East All Academic Team 2012–13, 2014-15
- WHEA Co-Player of the Week on October 7, 2013
- JWHL All Star Team 2011
- 2wo time Beanpot Champion 2012, 2013
- Captain of Team USA Maccabiah Games; Silver medalist Maccabiah Games
- Maccabiah Legend

== See also ==
- List of select Jewish ice hockey players
