= 2010 IIHF World Women's U18 Championship =

Tournament details
- Host country: United States
- Venue(s): Walter Bush Arena, Bob Allen Arena (in 1 host city)
- Dates: 27 March – 3 April 2010
- Teams: 8

Final positions
- Champions: Canada (1st title)
- Runners-up: United States
- Third place: Sweden

Tournament statistics
- Games played: 21
- Goals scored: 154 (7.33 per game)
- Attendance: 3,790 (180 per game)
- Scoring leader: (Canada) Jessica Campbell (15 points)

Awards
- MVP: (Canada) Jessica Campbell

The 2010 IIHF World Women's U18 Championship was the third junior female world ice hockey championships. It was held from 27 March through 3 April 2010, in Chicago, Illinois. The championship is the Under-18 junior ice hockey edition of the women worlds, organized by the International Ice Hockey Federation (IIHF).

Eight teams played in the top division, and six teams played in Division I.

== Teams ==
The following teams will participate in the championship:

- Canada
- Czech Republic
- Finland
- Germany
- Japan
- Russia
- Sweden
- United States

== Preliminary round ==
=== Group A ===
Japan's 3–1 victory over Finland is the first time in IIHF history that any Japanese national team had ever beaten a Finnish national team.

==== Standings ====
Team	Pld	W	OTW	OTL	L	GF	GA	GD	Pts	Qualification
United States	3	3	0	0	0	31	1	+30	9	Semifinals
Finland	3	1	0	0	2	6	9	−3	3	Quarterfinals
Japan	3	1	0	0	2	7	17	−10	3	Quarterfinals
Czech Republic	3	1	0	0	2	6	23	−17	3	Relegation Round

Source: IIHF

==== Results ====
All times local (UTC−5)

27 March 2010; 15:00	Czech Republic	1–5 (1–0, 0–2, 0–3)	Finland	Bob Allen Arena; Attendance: 152

Game reference

Veronika Hladíková
Goalies
Susanna Airaksinen
Referee:
(United States) Tara Leighton

Fialová (Mrázová) (PP1) 08:44	1–0
	1–1	23:28 Niskanen (Mäkinen, Kettunen)
	1–2	30:00 (PP1) Rantanen (Mäenpänen, Lintula)
	1–3	53:35 Rantanen (Oinonen, Mäkinen)
	1–4	57:13 Rantanen (Lintula)
	1–5	57:51 Niskanen (Mäkinen)

12 min
Penalties
14 min
19
Shots
47

27 March 2010; 19:30	United States	11–1 (2–0, 5–0, 4–1)	Japan	Walter Bush Arena; Attendance: 312

Game reference

Aubree Moore
Goalies
Ai Tokoro (out 40:00)
Shizuka Takahashi (in 40:00)
Referee:
(Czech Republic) Radka Růžičková

Ammerman (Hickel) 11:57	1–0
Carpenter (SH1) 16:00	2–0
Fry (Mangene) 23:41	3–0
Ammerman (Bizzari) 28:51	4–0
Bona (Pfalzer) 31:08	5–0
Hickel (Slavin, Carpenter) 39:45	6–0
Skarupa (Lorence) 39:57	7–0
Coyne (Gedman, Slavin) 49:18	8–0
	8–1	50:50 Fujimoto
Coyne (Mangene, Pelkey) 52:49	9–1
Coyne (Pelkey) 56:09	10–1
Ammerman (Bizzari, Picard) 56:51	11–1

6 min
Penalties
6 min
56
Shots
8

28 March 2010; 18:30	Czech Republic	5–3 (4–2, 0–1, 1–0)	Japan	Bob Allen Arena

Game reference

Veronika Hladíková (out 08:04)
Lenka Craigová (in 08:04)
Goalies
Ai Tokoro (out 20:00)
Shizuka Takahashi (in 20:00)
Referee:
(France) Marie Picavet

Solničková (Mrázová) 07:35	1–0
	1–1	07:57 Moritake (Morii)
	1–2	08:04 Osawa (Terashima, Fujimoto)
Fialová (Křížová) 14:30	2–2
Povova (Horáková) 19:21	3–2
Křížová 19:34	4–2
	4–3	27:33 Morii
Křížová (Mrázová) (ENG) 59:06	5–3

14 min
Penalties
6 min
27
Shots
24

28 March 2010; 19:30	Finland	0–5 (0–0, 0–3, 0–2)	United States	Walter Bush Arena

Game reference

Isabella Portnoj
Goalies
Alex Rigsby
Referee:
(Germany) Michaela Kiefer

0–1	25:28 (PP1) Coyne (Skarupa)
0–2	30:35 Carpenter (Pelkey)
0–3	35:44 (PP1) Mangene
0–4	50:34 (PP1) Coyne (Gedman)
0–5	51:35 Bizzari (Skarupa, Ammerman)

18 min
Penalties
16 min
13
Shots
49

30 March 2010; 18:30	Japan	3–1 (2–0, 0–1, 1–0)	Finland	Bob Allen Arena; Attendance: 48

Game reference

Shizuka Takahashi
Goalies
Susanna Airaksinen
Referee:
(Canada) Mélanie Bordeleau

Abe (Sugusawa, Toko) (PP1) 02:41	1–0
Sugisawa 06:17	2–0
	2–1	23:38 (PP1) Rantanen (Niskanen)
Abe (Toko) 45:31	3–1

4 min
Penalties
22 min
23
Shots
35

30 March 2010; 19:30	United States	15–0 (5–0, 6–0, 4–0)	Czech Republic	Walter Bush Arena; Attendance: 364

Game reference

Aubree Moore
Goalies
Lenka Craigová (out 28:41)
Veronika Hladíková (in 28:41)
Referee:
(Finland) Päivi Laurla

Coyne (Mangene, Picard) (PP1) 02:03	1–0
Fry (Bizzari, Gedman) 02:33	2–0
Ammerman (Hickel) 06:42	3–0
Carpenter 08:41	4–0
Carpenter (Skarupa) 15:38	5–0
Lorence (Skarupa, Figueroa) 21:49	6–0
Carpenter (Lorence, Skarupa) 28:16	7–0
Skarupa (Pfalzer) (PP1) 31:24	8–0
Carpenter (Picard, Mangene) (PP1) 35:58	9–0
Coyne 36:05	10–0
Coyne (Wasylk, Pfalzer) 36:39	11–0
Wasylk (Pelkey) 44:39	12–0
Coyne (Mangene, Skarupa) 45:35	13–0
Gedman (Pfalzer, Ammerman) 49:18	14–0
Skarupa (Lorence) 51:24	15–0

6 min
Penalties
14 min
67
Shots
16

=== Group B ===
==== Standings ====
Team	Pld	W	OTW	OTL	L	GF	GA	GD	Pts	Qualification
Canada	3	3	0	0	0	29	3	+26	9	Semifinals
Sweden	3	2	0	0	1	9	13	−4	6	Quarterfinals
Germany	3	1	0	0	2	7	21	−14	3	Quarterfinals
Russia	3	0	0	0	3	5	13	−8	0	Relegation Round

Source: IIHF

==== Results ====
All times local (UTC−5)

27 March 2010; 16:00	Canada	6–3 (3–1, 1–1, 2–1)	Russia	Walter Bush Arena; Attendance: 170

Game reference

Erica Howe
Goalies
Anna Prugova
Referee:
(Finland) Päivi Laurla

	0–1	05:45 Sosina (Tsirkunova)
Davis (Lacquette) 13:14	1–1
Daoust (Fulton) 14:52	2–1
McParland (Daoust, Lacquette) 15:05	3–1
Saulnier (Bestland, Campbell) (PP1) 29:11	4–1
	4–2	31:35 Sosina (Belyakova)
Lacquette (Saulnier) (PP1) 46:28	5–2
	5–3	48:13 (PP1) Belyakova (Sosina, Pechikova)
Terry (Davis, Rattray) 59:25	6–3

6 min
Penalties
16 min
60
Shots
7

27 March 2010; 18:30	Sweden	5–4 (3–2, 2–1, 0–1)	Germany	Bob Allen Arena; Attendance: 100

Game reference

Annika Ferngren
Goalies
Nadja Gruber
Referee:
(Canada) Mélanie Bordeleau

L. Johansson (Lilja, Löwenhielm) 02:34	1–0
Hedengren (Åström, Wester) (PP1) 06:38	2–0
	2–1	07:45 (PP1) Rothemund
Borgfeldt 19:17	3–1
	3–2	19:37 Strohmaier
	3–3	21:46 (PP1) Anwander (Strohmaier, Janzen)
Hedengren (Wester) 32:45	4–3
Åström (Hedengren) 34:59	5–3
	5–4	52:47 Anwander (Janzen)

12 min
Penalties
8 min
30
Shots
22

28 March 2010; 15:00	Sweden	4–1 (1–0, 2–0, 1–1)	Russia	Bob Allen Arena; Attendance: 105

Game reference

Sofia Carlström
Goalies
Anna Prugova
Referee:
(United States) Tara Leighton
Linesmen:
(United States) Alici Hanrahan
(Germany) Veronika Stenzel

Olsson (Holmgren, Bäcklin) (PP1) 15:38	1–0
Hedengren (Borgfeldt, Lillbäck) (PP1) 33:24	2–0
E. Johansson (Holmgren, Hedengren) 39:35	3–0
Lilja (Åström) (PP1) 49:34	4–0
	4–1	54:18 Sosina (Pechikova)

12 min
Penalties
20 min
54
Shots
17

28 March 2010; 16:00	Germany	0–15 (0–5, 0–4, 0–6)	Canada	Walter Bush Arena; Attendance: 127

Game reference

Stephanie Hruby
Goalies
Carmen MacDonald
Referee:
(Czech Republic) Radka Růžičková

0–1	03:08 Daoust (Doyle)
0–2	03:37 Cudmore
0–3	07:23 Doyle (Rattray, Bestland)
0–4	08:26 Saulnier (Campbell, Lacquette)
0–5	09:50 Terry (Rattray, Cudmore)
0–6	22:52 Mercer (McParland, Campbell)
0–7	26:51 (PP1) Campbell (Ambrose, Lacquette)
0–8	35:11 Bestland (Campbell, Saulnier)
0–9	37:19 (PP1) Terry (Rattray, Ambrose)
0–10	43:16 Doyle (Campbell)
0–11	44:34 (PP1) Cudmore (Mercer)
0–12	48:33 Rattray (Terry)
0–13	53:55 (PP1) Amstrong (Ambrose, Fulton)
0–14	57:38 Campbell (Saulnier)
0–15	58:30 Davis (Terry)

16 min
Penalties
18 min
14
Shots
46

30 March 2010; 15:00	Russia	1–3 (0–1, 0–1, 1–1)	Germany	Bob Allen Arena; Attendance: 63

Game reference

Anna Prugova
Goalies
Nadja Gruber
Referee:
(France) Marie Picavet

	0–1	04:24 Janzen (Voight)
	0–2	21:18 Delarbre
	0–3	45:06 (PP1) Strohmaier (Eisenschmid)
A. Shibanova (T. Shibanova, Vovrushko) (PP1) 59:19	1–3

12 min
Penalties
18 min
32
Shots
39

30 March 2010; 16:00	Canada	8–0 (3–0, 4–0, 1–0)	Sweden	Walter Bush Arena; Attendance: 115

Game reference

Carmen MacDonald (out 29:52)
Erica Howe (in 29:52)
Goalies
Annika Ferngren
Referee:
(Germany) Michaela Kiefer

Campbell (Bestland, Ambrose) (PP1) 05:38	1–0
Davis (Lacquette, Ambrose) 07:50	2–0
Lacquette (Ambrose, Campbell) (PP1) 14:24	3–0
Terry (Cai. MacDonald) 20:57	4–0
Campbell (Saulnier, Lacquette) 22:12	5–0
Armstrong (Daoust, Fulton) 25:56	6–0
McParland (Ambrose, Mercer) (PP2) 35:18	7–0
Kingsbury (McParland, Lacquette) 53:37	8–0

6 min
Penalties
14 min
53
Shots
12

== Relegation Round ==
The relegation round was played as a best-of-three playoff. The Czech Republic sweep hence rendered the last game unnecessary.

This is the first time any Russian national team has ever been officially relegated since the country began international competition in 1954 as part of the Soviet Union. (The senior Russian women's team finished the 2005 World Championships in a relegation position, but an expansion of the 2007 tournament to nine teams in 2007 granted them a reprieve.)

31 March 2010; 18:30	Czech Republic	5–0 (1–0, 0–0, 4–0)	Russia	Walter Bush Arena; Attendance: 69

Game reference

Veronika Hladíková
Goalies
Anna Prugova
Referee:
(Canada) Mélanie Bordeleau

Solničková (Mrázová) 09:35	1–0
Kaplanová (Pekárková) (PP1) 42:09	2–0
Křížová (Solničková, Mrázová) 47:28	3–0
Kaplanová (Výtisková, Povová) 54:39	4–0
Horáková (Povová) (PP1) 58:57	5–0

12 min
Penalties
14 min
41
Shots
25

2 April 2010; 15:00	Russia	1–3 (0–1, 0–1, 1–1)	Czech Republic	Bob Allen Arena; Attendance: 68

Game reference

Anna Prugova
Goalies
Veronika Hladíková
Referee:
(Germany) Michaela Kiefer

	0–1	10:00 Křížová
	0–2	34:37 (PP1) Křížová (Solničková)
	0–3	46:15 Povová (Výtisková, Horáková)
Mitrofanova (Belyakova) 59:11	1–3

8 min
Penalties
14 min
30
Shots
27

3 April 2010; 12:00	Czech Republic	Not necessary	Russia	Bob Allen Arena

Russia is relegated to Division I for the 2011 IIHF World Women's U18 Championship.

== Final round ==
Quarterfinals
A2	Finland	1
B3	Germany	2
B2	Sweden	2
A3	Japan	1

Semifinals
B1	Canada	10
B3	Germany	0
A1	United States	5
B2	Sweden	0

Final
A1	United States	4
B1	Canada	5
Third place
B2	Sweden	7
B3	Germany	3

=== Quarterfinals ===
31 March 2010; 16:00	Sweden	2–1 (0–0, 2–0, 0–1)	Japan	Walter Bush Arena; Attendance: 95

Game reference

Sofia Carlström
Goalies
Shizuka Takahashi
Referee:
(Finland) Päivi Laurla

Wester (Lilja) 21:34	1–0
Hedengren (SH1) 36:54	2–0
	2–1	59:14 Terashima (Ishiura, Ukita)

10 min
Penalties
6 min
59
Shots
18

31 March 2010; 19:30	Finland	1–2 OT (0–0, 1–0, 0–1, 0–1)	Germany	Walter Bush Arena; Attendance: 54

Game reference

Isabella Portnoj
Goalies
Nadja Gruber
Referee:
(France) Marie Picavet

Hallikainen (Laitila) 22:15	1–0
	1–1	44:41 (PP1) Eisenschmid (Marx, Strohmaier)
	1–2	66:21 (PP1) Anwander (Strohmaier, Gleissner)

41 min
Penalties
18 min
40
Shots
32

=== Semifinals ===
2 April 2010; 16:00	Canada	10–0 (2–0, 1–0, 7–0)	Germany	Walter Bush Arena; Attendance: 220

Game reference

Carmen MacDonald
Goalies
Stephanie Hruby (out 49:20)
Nadja Gruber (in 49:20)
Referee:
(United States) Tara Leighton

Armstrong (Daoust, Poudrier) 01:54	1–0
Rattray (Terry) 17:39	2–0
Cai. MacDonald (Doyle, McParland) 34:51	3–0
Saulnier (Cai. MacDonald, Ambrose) (PP1) 40:34	4–0
McParland (Poudrier, Fulton) 44:04	5–0
Campbell (Cudmore, Poudrier) 47:20	6–0
Campbell (Saulnier, Bestland) 51:21	7–0
Saulnier (Bestland, Cai. MacDonald) 51:41	8–0
Daoust (Kingsbury, Rattray) 53:04	9–0
Bestland (Campbell, Lacquette) 54:38	10–0

14 min
Penalties
8 min
61
Shots
12

2 April 2010; 19:30	United States	5–0 (2–0, 2–0, 1–0)	Sweden	Walter Bush Arena; Attendance: 438

Game reference

Alex Rigsby
Goalies
Sofia Carlström
Referee:
(Canada) Mélanie Bordeleau

Ammerman (Pfalzer, Figueroa) 01:22	1–0
Bona (Fry) 12:37	2–0
Wasylk (Coyne, Pelkey 20:34	3–0
Carpenter (Pelkey, Pfalzer) (PP1) 32:13	4–0
Fry (Bizzari) 44:29	5–0

8 min
Penalties
12 min
41
Shots
11

=== 5th place playoff ===
2 April 2010; 18:30	Finland	4–1 (1–0, 1–0, 2–1)	Japan	Walter Bush Arena; Attendance: 43

Game reference

Susanna Airaksinen
Goalies
Shizuka Takahashi
Referee:
(Czech Republic) Radka Růžičková

Tapani (Jokinen) 03:39	1–0
Niskanen (Rahunen, Tapani) 25:38	2–0
	2–1	43:54 (PP1) Koike (Toko)
Mäkinen (Niskanen, Rahunen) 55:00	3–1
Tapani (Mäkinen) (ENG) 59:56	4–1

14 min
Penalties
8 min
41
Shots
17

=== Bronze medal game ===
3 April 2010; 15:00	Sweden	7–3 (4–1, 3–0, 0–2)	Germany	Walter Bush Arena; Attendance: 120

Game reference

Sofia Carlström
Goalies
Nadja Gruber (out 34:28)
Stephanie Hruby (in 34:28)
Referee:
(Finland) Päivi Laurla

Stenberg 03:31	1–0
L. Johansson (Borgfeldt) 07:52	2–0
Stenberg (Holmgren) (PP1) 12:23	3–0
	3–1	14:10 Anwander (Janzen)
Stenberg (Wester) (PP1) 19:54	4–1
L. Johansson (Lilja) 21:12	5–1
Borgfeldt (Lilja) 33:20	6–1
Holmgren (Olsson) (PP1) 34:28	7–1
	7–2	44:18 (PP1) Strohmaier (Janzen, Eisenschmid)
	7–3	53:46 (PP1) Strohmaier (A. Fiegert)

14 min
Penalties
14 min
45
Shots
17

=== Gold medal game ===
3 April 2010; 19:30	United States	4–5 OT (3–1, 1–2, 0–1, 0–1)	Canada	Walter Bush Arena; Attendance: 1,127

Game reference

Alex Rigsby
Goalies
Carmen MacDonald
Referee:
(United States) Tara Leighton

Carpenter (Ammerman) (PP1) 00:50	1–0
	1–1	03:47 (PP1) Kingsbury (Rattray, Daoust)
Coyne (Figueroa) 10:03	2–1
Hickel (Bizzari) 10:50	3–1
	3–2	29:29 (PP1) Bestland (Saulnier, Campbell)
Mangene (Coyne, Pelkey) (PP1) 36:17	4–2
	4–3	36:54 Daoust (Lacquette, Kingsbury)
	4–4	52:29 McParland (Poudrier)
	4–5	63:10 Campbell (Lacquette, Ambrose)

18 min
Penalties
16 min
41
Shots
50

== Ranking and statistics ==
=== Final rankings ===
Pos	Grp	Team	Pld	W	OTW	OTL	L	GF	GA	GD	Pts	Final result
1	B	Canada	5	4	1	0	0	44	7	+37	14	Champions
2	A	United States (H)	5	4	0	1	0	40	6	+34	13	Runners-up
3	B	Sweden	6	4	0	0	2	18	22	−4	12	Third place
4	B	Germany	6	1	1	0	4	12	39	−27	5	Fourth place
5	A	Finland	5	2	0	1	2	11	12	−1	7	Fifth place game
6	A	Japan	5	1	0	0	4	9	23	−14	3	Fifth place game
7	A	Czech Republic	5	3	0	0	2	14	24	−10	9	Win Relegation game
8	B	Russia	5	0	0	0	5	6	21	−15	0	Relegation to Division I A

Source: IIHF
(H) Host

=== Scoring leaders ===
List shows the top skaters sorted by points, then goals. If the list exceeds 10 skaters because of a tie in points, all of the tied skaters are shown.

Player	GP	G	A	Pts	+/−	PIM	POS
(Canada) Jessica Campbell	5	7	8	15	+12	4	FW
(Canada) Brigette Lacquette	5	2	11	13	+15	6	DF
(United States) Kendall Coyne	5	10	2	12	+10	2	FW
(Canada) Jillian Saulnier	5	4	6	10	+9	2	FW
(United States) Alexandra Carpenter	5	8	1	9	+7	0	FW
(United States) Haley Skarupa	5	3	6	9	+9	0	FW
(Canada) Erin Ambrose	5	0	9	9	+14	0	DF
(United States) Brittany Ammerman	5	5	3	8	+6	4	FW
(Canada) Melodie Daoust	5	4	4	8	+7	4	FW
(Canada) Christine Bestland	5	3	5	8	+9	8	FW

GP = Games played; G = Goals; A = Assists; Pts = Points; +/− = Plus/minus; PIM = Penalties in minutes; POS = Position
Source: IIHF

=== Leading goaltenders ===
Only the top five goaltenders, based on save percentage, who have played 40% of their team's minutes are included in this list.

Player	TOI	SA	GA	GAA	Sv%	SO
(Canada) Carmen MacDonald	213:02	72	4	1.13	94.74	2
(Japan) Shizuka Takahashi	236:38	140	10	2.54	93.33	0
(United States) Alex Rigsby	183:10	69	5	1.64	93.24	2
(Finland) Susanna Airaksinen	180:00	54	5	1.67	91.53	0
(Finland) Isabella Portnoj	126:21	74	7	3.32	91.36	0

TOI = Time on ice (minutes:seconds); SA = Shots against; GA = Goals against; GAA = Goals against average; Sv% = Save percentage; SO = Shutouts
Source: IIHF

=== Tournament awards ===
Best players selected by the Directorate:

- Best Goaltender: (United States) Alex Rigsby
- Best Defenceman: (Canada) Brigette Lacquette
- Best Forward: (United States) Kendall Coyne
- MVP: (Canada) Jessica Campbell

Source: IIHF

== Division I ==
The tournament was held in Piešťany, Slovakia, from 3 to 9 April 2010.

Team	Pld	W	OTW	OTL	L	GF	GA	GD	Pts
Switzerland	5	5	0	0	0	44	5	+39	15
France	5	4	0	0	1	16	15	+1	12
Slovakia	5	3	0	0	2	17	9	+8	9
Austria	5	2	0	0	3	16	14	+2	6
Norway	5	1	0	0	4	14	27	−13	3
Kazakhstan	5	0	0	0	5	9	46	−37	0

Source: IIHF

Switzerland is promoted to Top Division for the 2011 IIHF World Women's U18 Championship

== See also ==
- 2010 IIHF World U18 Championships (Men)
- 2010 World Junior Ice Hockey Championships (Men)
