= 2014 4 Nations Cup =

Tournament details
- Host country: Canada
- Venue: 1 (in 1 host city)
- Dates: 4–8 November
- Teams: 4

Final positions
- Champions: Canada (14th title)
- Runners-up: United States
- Third place: Sweden
- Fourth place: Finland

Tournament statistics
- Games played: 8
- Goals scored: 28 (3.5 per game)
- Scoring leader(s): (Canada) Jenn Wakefield (United States) Dani Cameranesi (United States) Shiann Darkangelo (4 points)

The 2014 4 Nations Cup was a women's ice hockey tournament held in Kamloops, British Columbia, Canada. It was the nineteenth edition of the 4 Nations Cup.

== News ==
- October 16: Ten of the players named to the Canadian roster shall be making their debut with the Canadian national women's team. The ten players include: Erin Ambrose, Jessica Campbell, Emily Clark, Erica Howe, Halli Krzyzaniak, Emerance Maschmeyer, Jamie Lee Rattray, Jillian Saulnier, Kelly Terry and Blayre Turnbull.

== Results ==
=== Preliminary round ===
Pos	Team	Pld	W	OTW	OTL	L	GF	GA	GD	Pts	Qualification
1	Canada (H)	3	3	0	0	0	8	3	+5	9	Advance to Gold medal game
2	United States	3	2	0	0	1	10	3	+7	6	Advance to Gold medal game
3	Finland	3	1	0	0	2	2	8	−6	3	Advance to Bronze medal game
4	Sweden	3	0	0	0	3	0	6	−6	0	Advance to Bronze medal game

Source: Hockey Canada
Rules for classification: 1) points; 2) head-to-head points; 3) head-to-head goal difference; 4) head-to-head number of goals scored; 5) result against closest best-ranked team outside tied teams; 6) result against second-best ranked team outside tied teams; 7) seeding before tournament.
(H) Host

All times are local (UTC−8).

4 November 2014	Finland	0–5	United States	Interior Savings Centre, Kamloops

4 November 2014	Canada	2–0	Sweden	Interior Savings Centre, Kamloops

5 November 2014	Sweden	0–1	Finland	Interior Savings Centre, Kamloops

5 November 2014	United States	2–3	Canada	Interior Savings Centre, Kamloops

7 November 2014	United States	3–0	Sweden	Interior Savings Centre, Kamloops

7 November 2014	Canada	3–1	Finland	Interior Savings Centre, Kamloops

=== Bronze medal game ===
8 November 2014; 14:00	Sweden	2–1 OT (0–0, 0–1, 1–0) (OT 1–0)	Finland	Interior Savings Centre, Kamloops

Game reference

Kim Martin Hasson
Goalies
Eveliina Suonpää

	0–1	39:16 – Karvinen (Tulus, Hiirikoski) (PP)
Nordin – 56:27	1–1
Asserholt (Wester) – 69:00	2–1

10 min
Penalties
6 min
16
Shots
28

=== Gold medal game ===
8 November 2014; 19:00	United States	2–3 GWS (0–1, 2–1, 0–0) (OT 0–0) (SO: 0–1)	Canada	Interior Savings Centre, Kamloops; Attendance: 5,800

Game reference

Molly Schaus
Goalies
Geneviève Lacasse

	0–1	15:46 – Wakefield (Fortino, Watchorn) (PP)
Decker (Coyne) – 20:50	1–1
Knight – 29:08	2–1
	2–2	37:49 – Wakefield (Spooner, Birchard)

Carpenter (miss)
Decker (miss)
Knight (miss)
Shootout
(miss) Wakefield
Jenner
(miss) Rattray
10 min
Penalties
12 min
35
Shots
28

== Statistics ==
=== Final standings ===
Gold medal	Canada
Silver medal	United States
Bronze medal	Sweden
4	Finland

=== Scoring leaders ===
Only the top ten skaters, sorted by points, then goals, are included in this list.

Player	GP	G	A	Pts	PIM	POS
(Canada) Jenn Wakefield	4	3	1	4	2	F
(United States) Dani Cameranesi	4	2	2	4	4	F
(United States) Shiann Darkangelo	4	1	3	4	0	F
(Canada) Rebecca Johnston	4	3	0	3	4	F
(Canada) Haley Irwin	4	2	1	3	2	F
(Canada) Jamie Lee Rattray	3	1	2	3	0	F
(Canada) Courtney Birchard	4	0	3	3	4	F
(United States) Hilary Knight	4	3	0	3	2	F
(United States) Brianna Decker	4	2	1	3	0	F
(United States) Emily Pfalzer	4	2	1	3	0	D

GP = Games played; G = Goals; A = Assists; Pts = Points; PIM = Penalties in minutes; POS = Position
Source: Hockey Canada

==== Goaltending leaders ====
Only the top five goaltenders, based on save percentage, who have played at least 40% of their team's minutes, are included in this list.

Player	TOI	GA	GAA	SA	Sv%	SO
(Canada) Emerance Maschmeyer	120:00	1	0.50	24	.958	1
(Sweden) Kim Martin Hasson	129:00	3	1.40	70	.957	0
(United States) Molly Schaus	140:00	2	0.86	44	.955	1
(Sweden) Sara Grahn	118:32	4	2.02	80	.950	0
(Canada) Geneviève Lacasse	140:00	4	1.71	67	.940	0

TOI = Time on Ice (minutes:seconds); SA = Shots against; GA = Goals against; GAA = Goals against average; Sv% = Save percentage; SO = Shutouts
Source: Hockey Canada
