= 2009 IIHF World Women's U18 Championship =

International ice hockey competition

Tournament details
- Host country: Germany
- Venues: 2 (in 1 host city)
- Dates: 5–10 January 2009
- Teams: 8

Final positions
- Champions: United States (2nd title)
- Runners-up: Canada
- Third place: Sweden

Tournament statistics
- Games played: 20
- Goals scored: 172 (8.6 per game)
- Attendance: 4,810 (241 per game)
- Scoring leader: (United States) Amanda Kessel (19 points)

The 2009 IIHF World Women's U18 Championship was the second holding of the World Women's U18 Championships, the premier International Ice Hockey Federation (IIHF) tournament for top division national women's junior ice hockey teams. It was held from 5 January through 10 January 2009, in Füssen, Germany. Eight teams competed in the Top Division tournament. Team USA won the tournament for the second time. The Swiss national U18 team was relegated to Division I.

== Top Division ==
The 2009 IIHF World Women's U18 Championship – Division I was the first holding of an IIHF World Women's U18 Championship for the newly formed Division I. It was held from 28 December 2008 through 2 January 2009, in Chambéry, France. Five teams competed in the Division I tournament. The Japanese national U18 team won the tournament and gained promotion to the Top Division.

=== Teams ===
The following teams participated in the championship:

- Canada
- Czech Republic
- Finland
- Germany
- Russia
- Switzerland
- Sweden
- United States

=== Preliminary round ===
All times are local (UTC+1).

==== Group A ====
Pos	Team	Pld	W	OTW	OTL	L	GF	GA	GD	Pts	Qualification
1	United States	3	3	0	0	0	37	2	+35	9	Semifinals
2	Sweden	3	2	0	0	1	16	11	+5	6	Semifinals
3	Russia	3	1	0	0	2	6	25	−19	3	5–8th place semifinals
4	Germany	3	0	0	0	3	3	24	−21	0	5–8th place semifinals

Source: IIHF

5 January 2009; 19:30	United States	17–0 (9–0, 4–0, 4–0)	Russia	Füssen Rink II; Attendance: 104

Game reference

Alex Rigsby
Goalies
Anna Prugova
Yulia Leskina
Referee:
(Germany) Michaela Kiefer
Linesmen:
(Slovakia) Michaela Kudeľová
(China) Chunhua Liu

Packer (Decker) – 00:39	1–0
Wasylk (Kessel, Coyne) (PP) – 2:11	2–0
Ammerman (Mangene) (PP) – 5:01	3–0
Bozek (Coyne, Kelter) – 9:07	4–0
Ammerman – 10:57	5–0
Fry (Young, Brock) – 13:15	6–0
Kelter (Packer, Mangene) – 13:44	7–0
Wasylk (Kessel, Bolden) – 14:05	8–0
Kessel (Wasylk, Coyne) – 17:50	9–0
Kessel – 21:54	10–0
Wasylk (Kessel, Coyne) – 22:38	11–0
Kenyon (Pelkey, Nelson) (PP) – 28:41	12–0
Decker (Packer, Ammerman) – 35:16	13–0
Decker (Ammerman, Packer) – 40:35	14–0
Kessel (Coyne) – 55:38	15–0
Nelson (Kenyon) – 56:10	16–0
Fry (Dempsey, Kelter) (PP) – 58:39	17–0

2 min
Penalties
20 min
73
Shots
3

5 January 2009; 20:00	Sweden	8–1 (1–1, 1–0, 6–0)	Germany	Füssen Arena; Attendance: 650

Game reference
Referee: (United States) Erin Blair

6 January 2009; 19:30	Sweden	6–1 (1–1, 3–0, 2–0)	Russia	Füssen Rink II; Attendance: 53

Game reference
Referee: (Japan) Mamiko Utsumi

6 January 2009; 20:00	Germany	0–11 (0–4, 0–5, 0–2)	United States	Füssen Arena; Attendance: 550

Game reference
Referee: (France) Marie Picavet

7 January 2009; 19:30	United States	9–2 (3–0, 2–1, 4–1)	Sweden	Füssen Rink II; Attendance: 201

Game reference

Alex Rigsby
Goalies
Josephin Lennström
Referee:
(Czech Republic) Ludmila Nelibová
Linesmen:
(Slovakia) Michaela Kudeľová
(Switzerland) Evelyn Loretan

Packer (Ammerman) (PP) – 04:38	1–0
Coyne (Kessel) – 14:22	2–0
Decker – 14:45	3–0
Decker (Bolden, Young) (PP) – 21:48	4–0
	4–1	24:31 – Grahm (Enström) (PP)
Kelter (Kessel) (SH) – 37:55	5–1
Coyne (Kessel) – 43:17	6–1
Coyne (Kessel, Bozek) (PP) – 50:13	7–1
Bolden (Pelkey) (PP) – 53:34	8–1
Coyne (Kessel) (SH) – 57:35	9–1
	9–2	59:07 – Svedin (Enström)

49 min
Penalties
38 min
34
Shots
33

7 January 2009; 20:00	Russia	5–2 (1–0, 1–0, 3–2)	Germany	Füssen Arena; Attendance: 300

Game reference
Referee: (Canada) Mélanie Bordeleau

==== Group B ====
Pos	Team	Pld	W	OTW	OTL	L	GF	GA	GD	Pts	Qualification
1	Canada	3	3	0	0	0	35	1	+34	9	Semifinals
2	Czech Republic	3	1	0	1	1	8	18	−10	4	Semifinals
3	Switzerland	3	1	0	0	2	8	26	−18	3	5–8th place semifinals
4	Finland	3	0	1	0	2	5	11	−6	2	5–8th place semifinals

Source: IIHF

5 January 2009; 16:00	Czech Republic	1–2 GWS (1–1, 0–0, 0–0) (OT: 0–0) (SO: 0–1)	Finland	Füssen Rink II; Attendance: 86

Game reference
Referee: (Canada) Mélanie Bordeleau

5 January 2009; 16:30	Canada	16–1 (4–0, 6–1, 6–0)	Switzerland	Füssen Arena; Attendance: 166

Game reference

Roxanne Douville
Goalies
Sarah Küng
Sophie Anthamatten
Referee:
(Japan) Mamiko Utsumi
Linesmen:
(Sweden) Annika Floden
(United States) Kelli M. O'Brien

Wong (Daoust, Fortino) (PP) – 05:53	1–0
Langan (Saulnier) – 06:30	2–0
Langan – 10:27	3–0
Langan (Lacquette, Kingsbury) (PP) – 15:50	4–0
Langan – 22:44	5–0
Wong (McKeough) – 24:16	6–0
Campbell – 28:58	7–0
Jenner (Kingsbury) – 29:25	8–0
Rattray (Saulnier, Lacquette) – 30:26	9–0
	9–1	32:49 – Forster (Benz)
Jenner (Campbell, Kingsbury) – 35:38	10–1
Poulin (Fratkin) – 43:47	11–1
Rattray (Saulnier) – 45:30	12–1
Rattray – 52:09	13–1
Poulin (Daoust, Wong) (PP) – 53:18	14–1
Kingsbury (Campbell) – 53:49	15–1
Frykas (Pacholok, Bestland)	16–1

6 min
Penalties
12 min
80
Shots
7

6 January 2009; 16:00	Czech Republic	7–3 (2–1, 1–0, 4–2)	Switzerland	Füssen Rink II; Attendance: 161

Game reference
Referee: (Germany) Michaela Kiefer

6 January 2009; 16:30	Finland	0–6 (0–1, 0–3, 0–2)	Canada	Füssen Arena; Attendance: 310

Game reference
Referee: (Czech Republic) Ludmila Nelibová

7 January 2009; 16:00	Switzerland	4–3 (0–1, 4–2, 0–0)	Finland	Füssen Rink II; Attendance: 78

Game reference
Referee: (United States) Erin Blair

7 January 2009; 16:30	Canada	13–0 (3–0, 4–0, 6–0)	Czech Republic	Füssen Arena; Attendance: 150

Game reference
Referee: (France) Marie Picavet

=== Placement Round ===
==== 5–8th place semifinals ====
9 January 2009; 16:00	Switzerland	1–2 GWS (0–0, 1–1, 0–0) (OT: 0–0) (SO: 0–1)	Germany	Füssen Rink II; Attendance: 225

Game reference
Referee: (Czech Republic) Ludmila Nelibová

9 January 2009; 19:30	Russia	1–2 OT (1–0, 0–1, 0–0) (OT: 0–1)	Finland	Füssen Rink II; Attendance: 85

Game reference
Referee: (Canada) Mélanie Bordeleau

==== 7th place game ====
10 January 2009; 12:00	Switzerland	2–3 GWS (1–2, 1–0, 0–0) (OT: 0–0) (SO: 0–1)	Russia	Füssen Rink II; Attendance: 97

Game reference
Referee: (Germany) Michaela Kiefer

Switzerland is relegated to the 2010 IIHF World Women's U18 Championship – Division I.

==== 5th place game ====
10 January 2009; 15:30	Germany	1–2 (1–0, 0–1, 0–1)	Finland	Füssen Rink II; Attendance: 274

Game reference
Referee: (France) Marie Picavet

=== Playoff round ===
==== Bracket ====
Semifinals
A1	United States	18
B2	Czech Republic	0
B1	Canada	6
A2	Sweden	1

Finals
A1	United States	3
B1	Canada	2
Bronze medal game
A2	Sweden	9
B2	Czech Republic	1

==== Semifinals ====
9 January 2009; 16:30	Canada	6–1 (0–0, 3–1, 3–0)	Sweden	Füssen Arena; Attendance: 200

Game reference
Referee: (United States) Erin Blair

9 January 2009; 20:00	United States	18–0 (8–0, 6–0, 4–0)	Czech Republic	Füssen Arena; Attendance: 300

Game reference
Referee: (Japan) Mamiko Utsumi

==== Bronze medal game ====
10 January 2009; 14:00	Sweden	9–1 (4–0, 3–0, 2–1)	Czech Republic	Füssen Arena; Attendance: 120

Game reference

Josefin Lennström
Madeleine Schelander
Goalies
Monika Pěnčíková
Referee:
(Canada) Mélanie Bordeleau
Linesmen:
(Switzerland) Evelyn Loretan
(United States) Kelli O'Brian

Nordin (Enström, Bergius) (PP) – 00:51	1–0
Nordin (Myrén) (PP) – 04:40	2–0
Östberg (Rask, Siggelin Alstermark) – 05:20	3–0
Östberg (Rask, Myrén) – 15:00	4–0
Östberg (Myrén) (PP) – 24:19	5–0
Rask (Myrén, Östberg) – 29:15	6–0
Svedin (Enström, Jordansson) – 37:33	7–0
Holmgren – 44:46	8–0
	8–1	55:34 – Kovářová (Mrázová)
Östberg (Myrén) – 55:59	9–1

2 min
Penalties
10 min
52
Shots
11

==== Final ====
10 January 2009; 17:30	United States	3–2 OT (1–0, 1–1, 0–1) (OT: 1–0)	Canada	Füssen Arena; Attendance: 700

Game reference

Alex Rigsby
Goalies
Roxanne Douville
Referee:
(United States) Erin Blair
Linesmen:
(Sweden) Annika Floeden
(Slovakia) Michaela Kudeľová

Ammerman – 18:14	1–0
Wasylk (Coyne, Bozek) – 24:28	2–0
	2–1	38:35 – Daoust (Poulin)
	2–2	52:37 – Wong (Fratkin, Campbell)
Coyne (Bozek) (PP) – 66:47	3–2

26 min
Penalties
14 min
32
Shots
40

=== Final rankings ===
Pos	Grp	Team	Pld	W	OTW	OTL	L	GF	GA	GD	Pts	Final result
1	A	United States	5	4	1	0	0	58	4	+54	14	Champions
2	B	Canada	5	4	0	1	0	43	5	+38	13	Runners-up
3	A	Sweden	5	3	0	0	2	26	18	+8	9	Third place
4	B	Czech Republic	5	1	0	1	3	9	45	−36	4	Fourth place
5	B	Finland	5	1	2	0	2	9	13	−4	7	Fifth place game
6	A	Germany (H)	5	0	1	0	4	6	27	−21	2	Fifth place game
7	A	Russia	5	1	1	1	2	10	29	−19	6	Win Relegation game
8	B	Switzerland	5	1	0	2	2	11	31	−20	5	Relegation to Division I A

Source: IIHF
(H) Host

=== Statistics ===
==== Scoring leaders ====
List shows the top skaters sorted by points, then goals. If the list exceeds 10 skaters because of a tie in points, all of the tied skaters are shown.

Player	GP	G	A	Pts	+/−	PIM	POS
(United States) Amanda Kessel	5	6	13	19	+17	2	FW
(United States) Kendall Coyne	5	8	7	15	+14	2	FW
(Canada) Mélodie Daoust	5	6	6	12	+11	4	FW
(Sweden) Cecilia Östberg	5	6	6	12	+8	4	FW
(Canada) Marie-Philip Poulin	5	5	7	12	+10	2	FW
(Canada) Jessica Wong	5	4	8	12	+10	0	FW
(United States) Madison Packer	5	6	5	11	+13	14	FW
(United States) Brittany Ammerman	5	5	5	10	+16	2	FW
(Sweden) Klara Myrén	5	2	8	10	+4	14	FW
(United States) Brianna Decker	5	8	1	9	+15	4	FW

GP = Games played; G = Goals; A = Assists; Pts = Points; +/− = Plus/minus; PIM = Penalties in minutes; POS = Position
Source: IIHF

==== Goaltending leaders ====
Only the top five goaltenders, based on save percentage, who have played 40% of their team's minutes are included in this list.

Player	TOI	SA	GA	GAA	Sv%	SO
(United States) Alex Rigsby	186:47	72	4	1.28	94.74	1
(Russia) Anna Prugova	255:25	207	17	3.99	92.41	0
(Canada) Roxanne Douville	186:47	44	4	1.28	91.67	1
(Finland) Susanna Airaksinen	307:12	130	13	2.54	90.91	0
(Germany) Jule Flotgen	266:31	183	21	4.73	89.71	0

TOI = Time On Ice (minutes:seconds); SA = Shots against; GA = Goals against; GAA = Goals against average; Sv% = Save percentage; SO = Shutouts
Source: IIHF

=== Tournament awards ===
Best players selected by the directorate:

- Best Goaltender: (United States) Alex Rigsby
- Best Defenceman: (United States) Alev Kelter
- Best Forward: (United States) Amanda Kessel

== Division I ==
The tournament was held in Chambéry, France, from 28 December 2008 to 2 January 2009.

Team	Pld	W	OTW	OTL	L	GF	GA	GD	Pts
Japan	4	4	0	0	0	18	5	+13	12
France	4	2	1	0	1	9	7	+2	8
Slovakia	4	2	0	1	1	11	14	−3	7
Austria	4	1	0	0	3	8	13	−5	3
Norway	4	0	0	0	4	9	16	−7	0

Source: IIHF

Japan is promoted to the Top Division for the 2010 IIHF World Women's U18 Championship.

== See also ==
- 2009 Women's World Ice Hockey Championships
- 2009 IIHF World U18 Championships (Men)
- 2009 World Junior Ice Hockey Championships (Men)
