= Jacqueline Janzen =

German ice hockey player

- Born: 29 November 1993 (age 31); Villingen-Schwenningen, Germany
- Height: 5 ft 10 in (178 cm)
- Weight: 183 lb (83 kg; 13 st 1 lb)
- Position: Forward
- Shoots: L
- National team: Germany
- Playing career: 2009–present

Jacqueline Janzen (born November 29, 1993, in Villingen-Schwenningen, Germany) is a German ice hockey forward.

== International career ==
Janzen was selected for the Germany women's national ice hockey team in the 2014 Winter Olympics. She played in all five games, recording one assist.

As of 2014, Janzen has also appeared for Germany at one IIHF Women's World Championships, in 2011.

Janzen made three appearances for the Germany women's national under-18 ice hockey team, at the IIHF World Women's U18 Championships, with the first in 2009.

== Career statistics ==
=== International career ===
Through 2013-14 season

Year	Team	Event	GP	G	A	Pts	PIM
2009	Germany U18	U18	5	1	0	1	2
2010	Germany U18	U18	5	1	4	5	0
2011	Germany	WW DI	4	0	1	1	2
2012	Germany U18	U18	5	4	0	4	2
2014	Germany	Oly	5	0	1	1	0
