= Jenna McParland =

Canadian ice hockey player

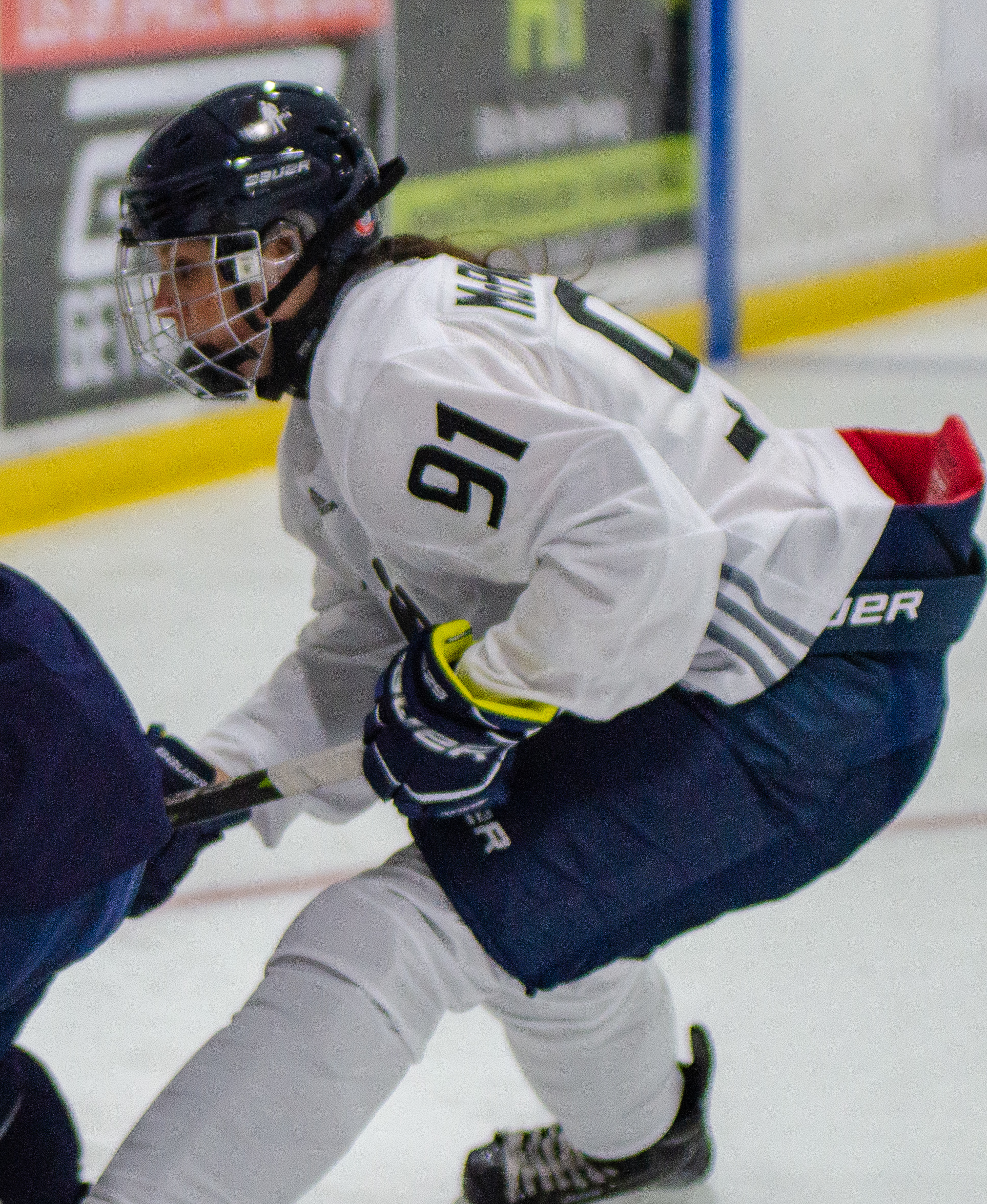
- McParland in 2019
- Born: May 12, 1992 (age 34) Schreiber, Ontario, Canada
- Height: 5 ft 9 in (175 cm)
- Weight: 143 lb (65 kg; 10 st 3 lb)
- Position: Forward
- Shoots: Right
- NWHL team: Toronto Six
- Played for: PWHPA; Markham Thunder; Minnesota Duluth Bulldogs
- National team: Canada
- Playing career: 2011–present

Jenna McParland (born May 12, 1992) is a Canadian ice hockey forward, currently playing for the Toronto Six in the National Women's Hockey League (NWHL).

== Playing career ==
Across 141 NCAA Division I games with the Minnesota Duluth Bulldogs, McParland scored 116 points.

She was drafted 6th overall by the Brampton Thunder in the 2015 CWHL Draft. After graduating, she signed with Brampton in the Canadian Women's Hockey League (CWHL). She would play the next four seasons with the club, until the collapse of the CWHL in 2019. In 2018, she won the Clarkson Cup with the team.

In May 2019, she joined the Professional Women's Hockey Players Association (PWHPA), and would spend the 2019–20 season with the organisation. In 2020, she signed with the expansion Toronto Six of the NWHL, but chose to opt-out of the 2020-21 COVID-19 bubble season.

=== International play ===
She played for Team Canada at the 2010 IIHF World Women's U18 Championship, scoring 7 points in 5 games as the country won gold.

== Personal life ==
She attended Robert F. Hall Catholic Secondary School in Caledon, Ontario. Her brother, Nick McParland, played three years in the ECHL.

== Career statistics ==
			Regular season					Playoffs
Season	Team	League	GP	G	A	Pts	PIM	GP	G	A	Pts	PIM
2015–16	Brampton Thunder	CWHL	24	8	11	19	8	2	1	0	1	0
2016–17	Brampton Thunder	CWHL	24	4	6	10	28	-	-	-	-	-
2017–18	Markham Thunder	CWHL	21	8	10	18	6	3	3	0	3	0
2018–19	Markham Thunder	CWHL	24	10	6	16	6	3	3	0	3	12
2019–20	Independent	PWHPA	-	-	-	-	-	-	-	-	-	-
CWHL totals			93	30	33	63	48	8	7	0	7	12
