= Sweden women's national under-18 ice hockey team =

Sweden
- Nickname: Tre Kronor (Three Crowns)
- Association: Swedish Ice Hockey Association
- General manager: Anders Lundberg
- Head coach: Andreas Karlsson (2025)
- Assistants: Johan Alm; Sebastian Byström; Johan Ryman; Adam Albelin
- Captain: Nellie Svensson (2025)
- Most games: Linnea Hedin (23); Michelle Löwenhielm (23)
- Top scorer: Cecilia Östberg (11)
- Most points: Cecilia Östberg (21)
- Team colors
- IIHF code: SWE
Home colours	Away colours

First international
- Sweden 4 – 1 Switzerland (Calgary, Canada; 7 January 2008)

Biggest win
- Sweden 14 – 0 Russia (Calgary, Canada; 8 January 2008)

Biggest defeat
- United States 10 – 0 Sweden (Stockholm, Sweden; 4 January 2011); Canada 10 – 0 Sweden (Östersund, Sweden; 15 January 2023)

IIHF U18 Women's World Championship
- Appearances: 17 (first in 2008)
- Best result: (silver) (2018, 2023)

International record (W–L–T)
- 32–34–0

Medal record

World U18 Championship
Silver medal – second place	2018 Russia	
Silver medal – second place	2023 Sweden	
Bronze medal – third place	2009 Germany	
Bronze medal – third place	2010 United States	
Bronze medal – third place	2012 Czech Republic	
Bronze medal – third place	2013 Finland	
Bronze medal – third place	2016 Canada	

The Swedish women's national under-18 ice hockey team (Swedish: Sveriges U18 damlandslag i ishockey) is the national women's junior ice hockey team of Sweden. The team represents Sweden at the International Ice Hockey Federation's Ice Hockey U18 Women's World Championship and other international ice hockey tournaments and events.

== U18 Women's World Championship record ==
The Swedish women's national under 18 ice hockey team is one of five teams to have participated in every IIHF U18 Women's World Championship Top Division tournament since the event was inaugurated in 2008. They have won seven IIHF U18 Women's World Championship medals, two silver (2018, 2023) and five bronze (2009, 2010, 2012, 2013, 2016).

Year	GP	W	OTW	OTL	L	GF	GA	Pts	Rank
(Canada) 2008	5	2	0	0	3	23	18	6	4th place
(Germany) 2009	5	3	0	0	2	26	18	9	(bronze) Won bronze medal
(United States) 2010	6	4	0	0	2	18	22	12	(bronze) Won bronze medal
(Sweden) 2011	5	3	0	1	1	9	16	10	5th place
(Czech Republic) 2012	6	3	1	0	2	16	19	11	(bronze) Won bronze medal
(Finland) 2013	6	3	0	1	2	15	22	10	(bronze) Won bronze medal
(Hungary) 2014	5	1	0	1	3	8	19	4	6th place
(United States) 2015	5	2	0	0	3	11	12	6	6th place
(Canada) 2016	6	4	0	0	2	18	11	12	(bronze) Won bronze medal
(Czech Republic) 2017	6	1	0	1	4	6	20	4	4th place
(Russia) 2018	5	2	0	1	2	8	16	7	(silver) Won silver medal
(Japan) 2019	5	1	0	1	3	8	13	4	5th place
(Slovakia) 2020	5	3	0	0	2	8	9	9	5th place
(Sweden) ~~2021~~	Cancelled due to the COVID-19 pandemic								
(United States) 2022	6	2	0	0	4	10	19	6	4th place
(Sweden) 2023	6	3	0	0	3	19	23	9	(silver) Won silver medal
(Switzerland) 2024	5	3	0	0	2	18	13	9	5th place
(Finland) 2025	6	1	2	0	3	13	13	7	4th place

== Team ==
=== Current roster ===
Roster for the 2025 IIHF U18 Women's World Championship.

Head coach: Andreas Karlsson
Assistant coaches: Johan Alm, Sebastian Byström, Johan Ryman (goaltender), Adam Albelin (video)

No.	Pos.	Name	Height	Weight	Birthdate	Club
1	G	Maja Helge	1.75 m (5 ft 9 in)	68 kg (150 lb)	19 January 2007 (age 19)	(Sweden) Frölunda HC
3	D	Selma Karlsson	1.61 m (5 ft 3 in)	65 kg (143 lb)	24 March 2008 (age 18)	(Sweden) Brynäs IF
4	D	Malva Lindgren	1.73 m (5 ft 8 in)	75 kg (165 lb)	19 January 2008 (age 18)	(Sweden) HV71
6	D	Nellie Svensson – C	1.72 m (5 ft 8 in)	65 kg (143 lb)	5 March 2007 (age 19)	(Sweden) Frölunda HC
7	D	Ebba Westerlind	1.74 m (5 ft 9 in)	68 kg (150 lb)	14 February 2008 (age 18)	(Sweden) Frölunda HC
10	D	Elsa Åberg	1.76 m (5 ft 9 in)	75 kg (165 lb)	13 February 2007 (age 19)	(Sweden) MoDo Hockey
11	F	Miranda Lindström	1.65 m (5 ft 5 in)	60 kg (130 lb)	3 November 2008 (age 18)	(Sweden) MoDo Hockey
12	F	Tilde Grillfors	1.65 m (5 ft 5 in)	69 kg (152 lb)	3 July 2008 (age 18)	(Sweden) Brynäs IF
14	F	Evelina Arvidsson	1.70 m (5 ft 7 in)	67 kg (148 lb)	22 March 2007 (age 19)	(Sweden) HV71
15	F	Edit Danielsson	1.68 m (5 ft 6 in)	57 kg (126 lb)	13 September 2007 (age 19)	(Sweden) Frölunda HC
16	D	Tillie Ytfeldt	1.76 m (5 ft 9 in)	75 kg (165 lb)	4 July 2008 (age 18)	(Sweden) Brynäs IF
17	F	Moa Johannesson	1.70 m (5 ft 7 in)	60 kg (130 lb)	26 February 2007 (age 19)	(Sweden) MoDo Hockey
18	F	Matilda Österman	1.65 m (5 ft 5 in)	64 kg (141 lb)	13 July 2008 (age 18)	(Sweden) Brynäs IF
20	F	Inez Nygren	1.64 m (5 ft 5 in)	64 kg (141 lb)	26 October 2008 (age 18)	(Sweden) Luleå HF
21	F	Elsa Pallin	1.54 m (5 ft 1 in)	68 kg (150 lb)	31 May 2007 (age 19)	(Sweden) MoDo Hockey
22	F	Linn Mattsson – A	1.67 m (5 ft 6 in)	70 kg (150 lb)	29 March 2007 (age 19)	(Sweden) Djurgården IF
23	F	Tilda Edsman	1.67 m (5 ft 6 in)	58 kg (128 lb)	10 May 2007 (age 19)	(Sweden) AIK
24	F	Ebba Hesselvall	1.60 m (5 ft 3 in)	55 kg (121 lb)	15 July 2009 (age 17)	(Sweden) Södertälje SK
25	F	Nellie Norén	1.75 m (5 ft 9 in)	63 kg (139 lb)	25 July 2008 (age 18)	(Sweden) Färjestad BK
28	D	Meja Andersson – A	1.71 m (5 ft 7 in)	62 kg (137 lb)	3 November 2007 (age 19)	(Sweden) IF Troja-Ljungby
29	F	Lovisa Engström	1.59 m (5 ft 3 in)	56 kg (123 lb)	29 March 2007 (age 19)	(Sweden) MoDo Hockey
30	G	Jorinde Heller	1.64 m (5 ft 5 in)	64 kg (141 lb)	22 May 2007 (age 19)	(Sweden) Linköping HC
35	G	Meja Engelin	1.72 m (5 ft 8 in)	58 kg (128 lb)	26 May 2008 (age 18)	(Sweden) Frölunda HC

Team biometrics

- Average age: 17 years
- Average height: 1.68 m (5 ft 6 in)
- Average weight: 65 kg (143 lb)

=== World Championship player awards ===
Best Defenseman
Selected by the tournament directorate

- 2022: Tuva Kandell
- 2023: Mira Jungåker

Best Goaltender
Selected by the tournament directorate

- 2013: Minatsu Murase
- 2016: Emma Söderberg
- 2018: Anna Amholt
- 2023: Felicia Frank

All-Star Team
Selected by members of the media

- 2013: Ebba Strandberg (D)
- 2016: Emma Söderberg (G), Jessica Adolfsson (D)
- 2018: Anna Amholt (G), Maja Nylén Persson (D)
- 2023: Felicia Frank (G), Mira Jungåker (D)

Top-3 Players on Team
Selected by the coaches

- 2008: Tina Enström (F), Klara Myrén (F), Cecilia Östberg (F)
- 2009: Isabella Jordansson (F), Emma Nordin (F), Cecilia Östberg (F)
- 2010: Anna Borgfeldt (F), Josefine Holmgren (D), Lisa Hedengren (F)
- 2011: Lina Bäcklin (D), Sofia Carlström (G), Olivia Nyström (F)
- 2012: Matildah Andersson (F), Linnea Hedin (D), Michelle Löwenhielm (F)
- 2013: Linnea Hedin (D), Elin Johansson (F), Julia Lennartsson (F)
- 2014: Sarah Berglind (G), Denise Husak Asp (F), Hanna Sköld (F)
- 2015: Jessica Adolfsson (D), Hanna Olsson (F), Emma Söderberg (G)
- 2016: Maja Nylén Persson (D), Emma Söderberg (G), Moa Wernblom (F)
- 2017: Matilda af Bjur (F), Hanna Olsson (F), Sofia Reideborn (G)
- 2018: Anna Amholt (G), Maja Nylén Persson (D), Sofie Lundin (F)
- 2019: Emma Forsgren (D), Thea Johansson (F), Hanna Thuvik (F)
- 2020: Ida Boman (G), Thea Johansson (F), Annie Silén (D)
- 2022: Nicole Hall (F), Lisa Jönsson (G), Mira Markström (F)
- 2023: Felicia Frank (G), Mira Jungåker (D), Hilda Svensson (F)
- 2024: Mira Hallin (F), Ebba Hedqvist (F), Hilda Svensson (F)
- 2025: Meja Andersson (D), Edit Danielsson (F), Maja Helge (G)
- 2026: Tilde Grillfors (F), Ebba Hesselvall (F), Ebba Westerlind (D)

== See also ==
- Sweden women's national ice hockey team
- Swedish Women's Hockey League
- Women's ice hockey in Sweden
