= Carmen MacDonald =

Canadian ice hockey player (born 1992)

- Born: December 4, 1992 (age 33) Pictou, Nova Scotia, Canada
- Height: 5 ft 7 in (170 cm)
- Position: Goaltender
- Caught: Left
- ECAC team: St. Lawrence
- National team: Canada
- Playing career: 2008–2015
Medal record
Women's ice hockey
Representing Canada
IIHF U18 Women's World
Gold medal – first place	2010 United States	2010 Tournament

Carmen MacDonald (born December 4, 1992) is a Canadian retired ice hockey goaltender who most recently played for the St. Lawrence Saints in the Eastern College Athletic Conference (ECAC).

== Career ==
MacDonald was a member of the 2010 and 2011 New England champions at the Westminster School. She is also a field hockey and softball player.

=== NCAA ===
In December 2010, she committed to join the St. Lawrence Saints of the ECAC. On January 20 and 21, 2012, she backstopped the Skating Saints to a record of 1–0–1 in a home series versus the Clarkson Golden Knights. She posted a 49 save percentage during the series, helping the Saints extend their unbeaten streak to nine games. During February 2012, MacDonald registered a 7–1–0 record as the Skating Saints tied for fourth in the ECAC conference standings. In addition, she set a new Skating Saints single-season shutout record with six, with three coming in February. She made 32 saves to eliminate the Dartmouth Big Green and advance to the ECAC Semifinals. She made 30 saves for the Saints, who were out shot 33-19 by Cornell. MacDonald played a total of 125 games for St. Lawrence.

=== Hockey Canada ===
MacDonald was part of Canada women's national under-18 ice hockey team and won a gold medal at the 2010 IIHF World Women's Under-18 Championship in Chicago. As a member of the gold medal-winning squad, a hockey card of her was featured in the Upper Deck 2010 World of Sports card series. In addition, she participated in the Canada Celebrates Event on June 30 in Edmonton, which recognized the Canadian Olympic and World hockey champions from the 2009-10 season.

== Career statistics ==
=== Hockey Canada ===
Year	Event	GP	MIN	GA	SO	AVG	W	L	T	Sv %
2008	National Under 18	2	120	5	0	2.50	0	2	0	.929
2009	National Under 18	2	125	4	0	1.92	1	1	0	.932

== Awards and honours ==
- ECAC Rookie of the Week (Week of January 24, 2012)
- Nominee, 2012 ECAC Rookie of the Year
- ECAC Goaltender of the Month Award (February 2012)
- ECAC Rookie of the Month Award (February 2012)
- ECAC All-Rookie Team (2011–12)
- ECAC Goaltender of the Week (Week of January 7, 2013)
