= Cecilia Östberg =

Swedish ice hockey player (born 1991)

- Born: 15 January 1991 (age 35) Insjön, Sweden
- Height: 166 cm (5 ft 5 in)
- Weight: 148 kg (326 lb; 23 st 4 lb)
- Position: Left Wing
- Shot: Left
- Played for: Leksands IF
- National team: Sweden
- Playing career: 2008–2017

Lisa Cecilia Östberg (born 15 January 1991 in Insjön, Sweden) is a Swedish retired ice hockey forward.

== International career ==
Östberg was selected for the Sweden women's national ice hockey team in the 2010 Winter Olympics. She played in all five games, recording two assists.

Östberg has also appeared for Sweden at two IIHF Women's World Championships. Her first appearance came in 2008.

Östberg made two appearances for the Sweden women's national under-18 ice hockey team, at the IIHF World Women's U18 Championships in 2008 and 2009, including winning a bronze medal in the 2009 event.

== Career statistics ==
=== International career ===
Year	Team	Event	GP	G	A	Pts	PIM
2008	Sweden U18	U18	5	5	4	9	0
2008	Sweden	WW	4	0	3	3	2
2009	Sweden U18	U18	5	6	6	12	4
2009	Sweden	WW	5	0	2	2	2
2010	Sweden	Oly	5	0	2	2	0
