= Lina Wester =

Swedish ice hockey forward (born 1992)

- Born: 7 November 1992 (age 33) Rättvik, Sweden
- Height: 5 ft 7 in (170 cm)
- Weight: 128 lb (58 kg; 9 st 2 lb)
- Position: Forward
- Shoots: Left
- RKS team: Leksands IF
- National team: Sweden
- Playing career: 2010–present

Lina Teresia Wester (born 7 November 1992) is a Swedish ice hockey forward.

== International career ==
Wester was selected for the Sweden women's national ice hockey team in the 2014 Winter Olympics. She played in all six games, scoring one goal.

As of 2014, Wester has also appeared for Sweden at three IIHF Women's World Championships. Her first appearance came in 2011.

Wester made one appearance for the Sweden women's national under-18 ice hockey team, at the IIHF World Women's U18 Championships, in 2010, winning a bronze medal.

== Career statistics ==
Through 2013–14 season

Year	Team	Event	GP	G	A	Pts	PIM
2010	Sweden U18	U18	6	1	3	4	4
2011	Sweden	WW	5	0	0	0	0
2012	Sweden	WW	5	0	1	1	14
2013	Sweden	WW	5	1	2	3	8
2014	Sweden	Oly	6	1	0	1	8
