= Josefine Holmgren =

Swedish ice hockey player (born 1993)

- Born: 11 April 1993 (age 33) Skutskär, Sweden
- Height: 174 cm (5 ft 9 in)
- Weight: 73 kg (161 lb; 11 st 7 lb)
- Position: Defence
- Shoots: Left
- SDHL team Former teams: Djurgårdens IF; Brynäs IF
- National team: Sweden
- Playing career: 2008–present
Medal record
World Championship
Bronze medal – third place	2026 Denmark

Camilla Josefine Holmgren (born 11 April 1993) is a Swedish ice hockey defenceman and member of the Swedish national ice hockey team, currently playing with Djurgårdens IF Hockey Dam of the Swedish Women's Hockey League (SDHL).

== International career ==
Holmgren was selected for the Sweden women's national ice hockey team in the 2014 Winter Olympics. She played in all six games, not recording a point.

Holmgren made three appearances for the Sweden women's national under-18 ice hockey team, at the IIHF World Women's U18 Championships, with the first in 2009. This included winning a bronze medal in 2010. She represented Sweden at the 2019 IIHF Women's World Championship.

== Career statistics ==
=== International career ===
Through 2013–14 season

Year	Team	Event	GP	G	A	Pts	PIM
2009	Sweden U18	U18	5	1	0	1	4
2010	Sweden U18	U18	6	1	3	4	4
2011	Sweden U18	U18	5	0	0	0	2
2014	Sweden	Oly	6	0	0	0	0
