= Kateřina Mrázová (ice hockey) =

Czech ice hockey player (born 1992)

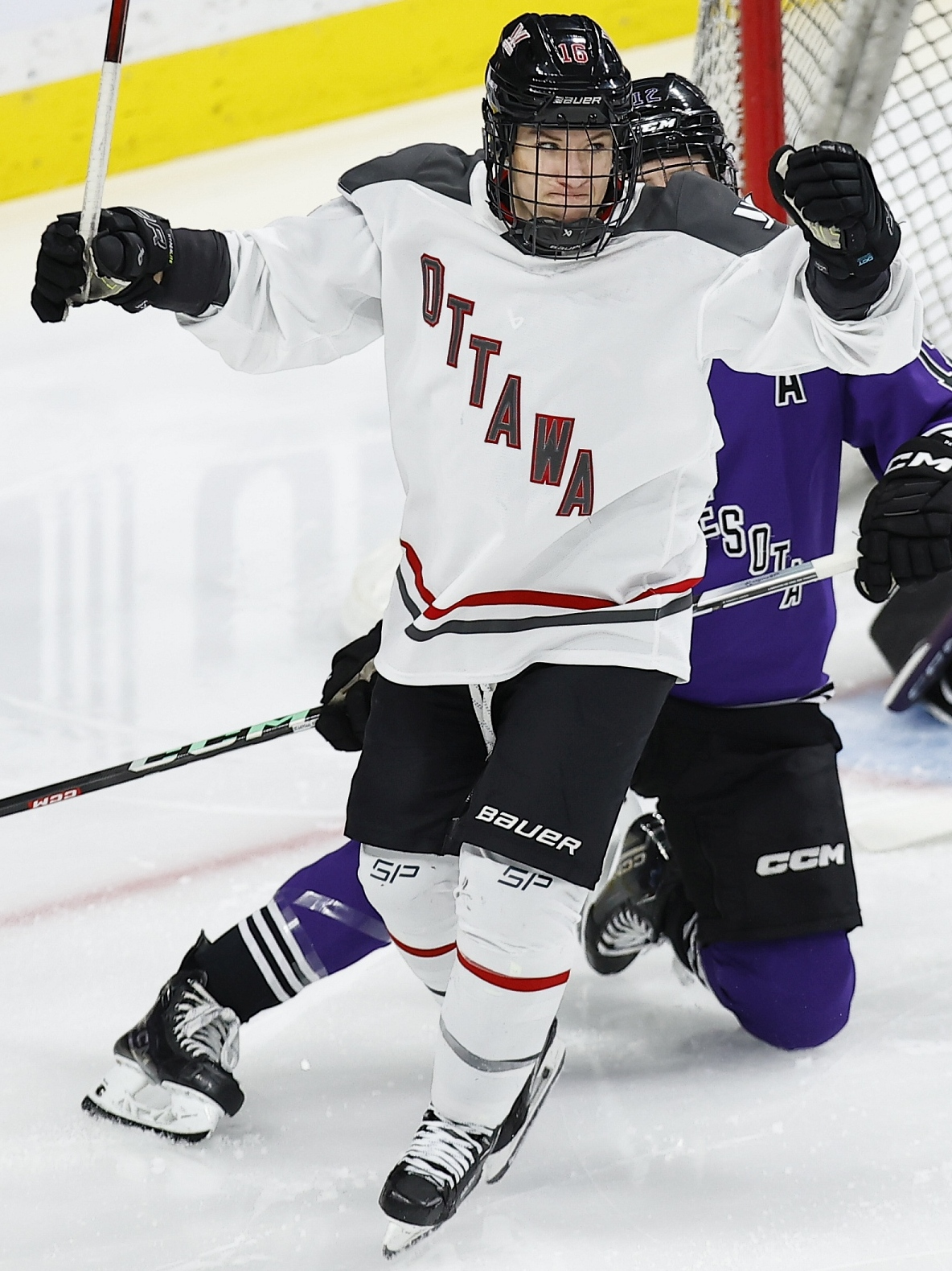
- Mrázová with PWHL Ottawa in 2024
- Born: 19 October 1992 (age 33) Kolín, Czechoslovakia
- Height: 1.63 m (5 ft 4 in)
- Weight: 64 kg (141 lb; 10 st 1 lb)
- Position: Centre
- Shoots: Left
- PWHL team Former teams: Ottawa Charge: Färjestad BK; Connecticut Whale; Brynäs IF; Minnesota Duluth Bulldogs; Boston Blades; SC Kolín U18
- National team: Czech Republic
- Playing career: 2008–present
Medal record
World Championship
Bronze medal – third place	2022 Denmark
Bronze medal – third place	2023 Canada

Kateřina Mrázová (born 19 October 1992) is a Czech professional ice hockey forward for the Ottawa Charge of the Professional Women's Hockey League (PWHL) and a member of the Czech Republic women's national ice hockey team. Known for her stickhandling skill, she was the first European player to win the Clarkson Cup, winning the championship with the Boston Blades in 2013, and the first Czech player to score a goal in the National Women's Hockey League (NWHL; renamed PHF in 2021).

== Playing career ==
Her first season in the Canadian Women's Hockey League (CWHL) was in 2012–13. She played with the Boston Blades under the direction of head coach Digit Murphy and was used as a defensive forward. She contributed to the Blades' first regular season title and helped them secure the 2013 Clarkson Cup. She was the first European to win the coveted trophy.

After her rookie CWHL season, she left the league to play college ice hockey with the Minnesota Duluth Bulldogs women's ice hockey program in the Western Collegiate Hockey Association (WCHA) conference of the NCAA Division I. She stayed with the program for five seasons, though a knee injury kept her from playing for the entire 2015–16 season. Across 117 games, she scored 75 points and was named to the 2016–17 WCHA All-Academic Team.

On 11 July 2018, Mrázová returned to professional hockey and signed a contract with the Connecticut Whale of the NWHL. Along with Denisa Křížová, she was one of the first two Czech players to play in the NWHL and became the first Czech player to pick up a point. She logged 12 points in 15 games in the 2018–19 season with the Whale. On 20 October 2018, she scored the Whale's first power-play goal since mid-February 2018.

She played one year in the NWHL before returning to Europe to sign with Brynäs IF Dam of the Swedish Women's Hockey League (SDHL). She scored 51 points in 34 games in her debut SDHL season, the fourth leading scorer in the SDHL and top of the league in assists, and added another 10 points in five playoff games as Brynäs were defeated by Luleå HF/MSSK in the semi-finals. She would play three seasons with Brynäs before returning to Connecticut for the 2022-23 season.

Mrázová was drafted in the eighth round of the 2023 PWHL Draft by PWHL Ottawa. During the 2023–24 season she recorded six goals and 12 assists in 23 games. Her 18 points tied for ninth in PWHL scoring. On 20 June 2024, she signed a two-year contract extension with Ottawa.

== International play ==
She represented Czechia at three IIHF U18 Women's World Championships, being named an assistant captain in the 2010 tournament where the country finished in seventh.

Mrázová competed with the Czech Republic at the 2013 IIHF Women's World Championships. The tournament marked the first time the Czech Republic competed at the Top Division level. Although the Czechs lost to Sweden in the relegation round, Mrázová accumulated 2 points on two assists during the tournament.

She has competed in three Olympic qualification tournaments with Czechia, getting two points in three games in 2009 and scoring one goal in three games in 2013, the country failing to qualify both times. She notched three points in three games for Czechia's 2017 Olympic qualification run, the country ultimately failing to qualify for the 2018 Winter Olympics.

== Career statistics ==
=== Regular season and playoffs ===
			Regular season					Playoffs
Season	Team	League	GP	G	A	Pts	PIM	GP	G	A	Pts	PIM
2012–13	Boston Blades	CWHL	21	1	1	2	4	4	0	0	0	2
2013–14	Minnesota Duluth Bulldogs	WCHA	16	1	7	8	10	—	—	—	—	—
2014–15	Minnesota Duluth Bulldogs	WCHA	37	7	18	25	30	—	—	—	—	—
2015–16	Minnesota Duluth Bulldogs	WCHA	0	0	0	0	0	—	—	—	—	—
2016–17	Minnesota Duluth Bulldogs	WCHA	29	9	12	21	14	—	—	—	—	—
2017–18	Minnesota Duluth Bulldogs	WCHA	35	8	13	21	12	—	—	—	—	—
2018–19	Connecticut Whale	NWHL	15	6	6	12	4	1	1	1	2	0
2019–20	Brynäs IF	SDHL	34	15	36	61	18	5	3	7	10	4
2020–21	Brynäs IF	SDHL	29	23	40	63	14	8	4	9	13	4
2021–22	Brynäs IF	SDHL	23	17	37	54	33	10	3	12	15	4
2022–23	Connecticut Whale	PHF	19	8	9	17	12	3	0	1	1	0
2023–24	Färjestad BK	NDHL	7	11	24	35	2	—	—	—	—	—
2023–24	PWHL Ottawa	PWHL	23	6	12	18	16	—	—	—	—	—
2024–25	Ottawa Charge	PWHL	14	3	4	7	6	6	0	0	0	0
2025–26	Ottawa Charge	PWHL	30	2	7	9	8	8	0	2	2	0
PWHL totals			67	11	23	34	30	14	0	2	2	0

=== International ===
Year	Team	Event	Result	GP	G	A	Pts	PIM
2008	Czech Republic	U18	3rd place, bronze medalist(s)	5	1	2	3	6
2008	Czech Republic	OGQ	DNQ	3	1	1	2	2
2009	Czech Republic	U18	4th	5	2	2	4	4
2009	Czech Republic	WC D1	5th	5	4	3	7	0
2010	Czech Republic	U18	7th	5	0	5	5	2
2013	Czech Republic	OGQ	DNQ	3	1	0	1	0
2013	Czech Republic	WC	8th	5	0	2	2	0
2014	Czech Republic	WC D1A	1st	5	1	2	3	4
2014	Czech Republic	WWQ	DNQ	3	0	1	1	6
2015	Czech Republic	WC D1A	1st	5	3	4	7	2
2017	Czech Republic	OGQ	DNQ	3	0	3	3	0
2017	Czech Republic	WC	8th	6	1	1	2	2
2019	Czech Republic	WC	6th	5	1	2	3	2
2021	Czech Republic	WC	7th	6	1	3	4	6
2021	Czech Republic	OGQ	Q	3	2	4	6	0
2022	Czech Republic	OG	7th	5	1	0	1	4
2022	Czech Republic	WC	3rd place, bronze medalist(s)	7	1	8	9	0
2023	Czech Republic	WC	3rd place, bronze medalist(s)	7	2	2	4	6
2025	Czechia	WC	4th	6	0	5	5	2
2026	Czechia	OG	5th	5	0	1	1	2
Junior totals				15	3	9	12	12
Senior totals				82	19	42	61	38
