= Kelly Terry =

Canadian ice hockey player

- Born: June 6, 1992 (age 34) Toronto, Ontario, Canada
- Height: 5 ft 6 in (168 cm)
- Weight: 140 lb (64 kg; 10 st 0 lb)
- Position: Forward
- Shoots: Right
- CWHL team Former teams: Toronto Furies; Minnesota
- National team: Canada
- Playing career: 2010–present
Medal record
IIHF World Women's Championships
Silver medal – second place	2015 Sweden	Team
IIHF World Women's U18 Championships
Gold medal – first place	2010 United States	Team

Kelly Terry (born June 6, 1992) is a former women's ice hockey player for the Minnesota Golden Gophers. She made her debut with the Canada women's national ice hockey team at the 2014 4 Nations Cup.

== Playing career ==
=== NCAA ===
She joined the Minnesota Golden Gophers in autumn 2010. She accumulated thirty-nine points, while appearing in 38 contests.

=== Hockey Canada ===
Terry was part of Canada's National Women's Under-18 Team gold medal-winning squad at the 2010 IIHF World Women's Under-18 Championship in Chicago. As a member of the gold medal-winning squad, a hockey card of her was featured in the Upper Deck 2010 World of Sports card series. In addition, she participated in the Canada Celebrates Event on June 30 in Edmonton, Alberta which recognized the Canadian Olympic and World hockey champions from the 2009–10 season .

She was a member of Canada's National Women's Development Team that won a gold medal at the 2015 Nations Cup (formerly known as the Meco Cup).

== Career stats ==
=== CWHL ===
Year	Team	Games Played	Goals	Assists	Points	+/-	PIM	PPG	SHG	GWG
2014-15	Toronto Furies	16	3	10	13	-4	6	1	0	1

== Awards and honours ==
- 2009 Toronto Star's high school girls all-stars
- 2010-11 WCHA All-Rookie Team

== Personal ==
Her father, Bill Terry played collegiately at Michigan Tech. In addition, he played five games with the Minnesota North Stars during the 1987–88 season
