= Jessica Campbell (ice hockey) =

Canadian ice hockey player and coach

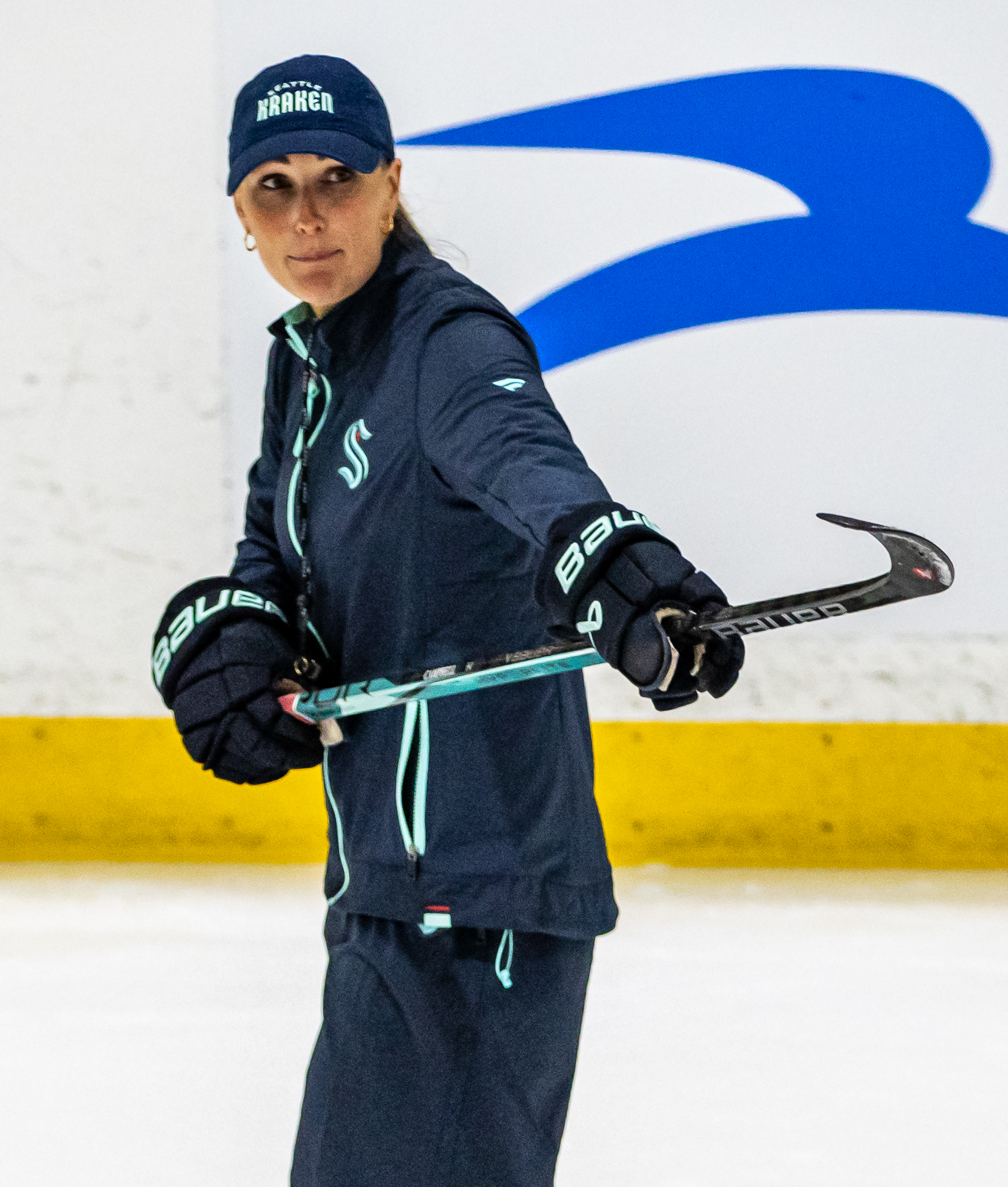
- Campbell with the Seattle Kraken in 2024
- Born: June 24, 1992 (age 34) Moosomin, Saskatchewan, Canada
- Height: 5 ft 5 in (165 cm)
- Weight: 137 lb (62 kg; 9 st 11 lb)
- Position: Forward
- Shot: Left
- Played for: Malmö Redhawks; Calgary Inferno; Cornell Big Red
- Coached for: Germany; Nürnberg Ice Tigers; Malmö Redhawks; Seattle Kraken
- National team: Canada
- Playing career: 2010–2020
- Coaching career: 2017–present
Medal record
World Championship
Silver medal – second place	2015 Sweden

Jessica Eve Campbell (born June 24, 1992) is a Canadian professional ice hockey coach and former player. As of 2026, she is manager of player development for the New Jersey Devils.

During her playing career, Campbell played for the Canadian women's national team. She made her debut playing with the Canadian national team at the 2014 4 Nations Cup and won a silver medal with the team at the 2015 IIHF Women's World Championship.

Her professional career was played in the Canadian Women's Hockey League (CWHL) with the Calgary Inferno and in the Swedish Damettan with the Malmö Redhawks. Campbell later became the first female assistant coach in the National Hockey League (NHL).

== Playing career ==
=== Early career ===
Campbell was a three-year member of Team Saskatchewan, twice serving as team captain. She represented Saskatchewan at the National Women's Under-18 Championship in 2007, as the team finished fifth overall. She won a gold medal at Saskatchewan provincials with the Melville Millionaires in 2006. In 2007, she competed in the Mac's Midget Tournament with the Melville Prairie Fire. She participated for Saskatchewan at the 2008 National Women's Under-18 Championship and placed fifth again. The following year, she played for Saskatchewan at the 2009 National Women's Under-18 and led the team to a seventh-place finish. Of note, Campbell led Melville in scoring in 2006-07 and 2007–08.

She was also part of Hockey Canada's Pursuit of Excellence team. She captained Pursuit of Excellence in 2008–09 and 2009–10. She won a silver medal at the Kamloops International Bantam Ice Hockey Tournament with Pursuit of Excellence in 2009, where she was recognized as top forward and tournament MVP. In 2009–10, she finished second in scoring and helped the Pursuit of Excellence win the 2010 Challenge Cup of the Junior Women's Hockey League (JWHL). In the 41 games she played with Pursuit of Excellence, she scored 57 goals and 47 assists for 104 points.

=== Cornell Big Red ===
Campbell’s college ice hockey career was played with the Cornell Big Red women's ice hockey program of Cornell University in the ECAC Hockey conference of the NCAA Division I from the 2010–11 season through the 2013–14 season.

On October 23, 2010, Campbell scored a hat-trick against the Robert Morris Colonials. Two of the goals came on the power play. In the 2010 ECAC Hockey semifinals, Campbell notched a goal in the win over the Quinnipiac Bobcats. Although she missed the ECAC Hockey championship game against Dartmouth due to injury, Campbell returned to the lineup for the NCAA Frozen Four loss to the Boston University Terriers on March 18. Campbell finished her inaugural season with the Big Red by appearing in 31 contests, registering 11 goals and accumulating 15 assists for 26 points and a +22 rating.

=== CWHL ===
At the 2014–15 CWHL All-Star Game, Campbell served as the captain for Team White, becoming the first-ever rookie to serve as an All-Star Game captain. Campbell scored the only goal for Team White in a 5–1 loss to Team Black at the 2015–16 CWHL All-Star Game.

In February 2016, she organized a fundraiser for Do It For Daron (DIFD), a non-profit organization that promotes "open dialogue about youth mental health." During the event, Calgary Inferno players donned purple jerseys, the official color of DIFD.

Campbell helped the Calgary Inferno capture their first-ever Clarkson Cup championship in 2016. Contested at Ottawa's Canadian Tire Centre, she scored twice in an 8–3 victory over Les Canadiennes de Montréal.

== International play ==
Medal record

Women's ice hockey

Representing Canada

World Championship
Silver medal – second place	2015 Sweden	

World U18 Championship
Gold medal – first place	2010 United States	
Silver medal – second place	2009 Germany	

4 Nations Cup
Gold medal – first place	2014 Canada	
Silver medal – second place	2015 Sweden	

Campbell first played with the Canadian women's national under-18 team in a March 24, 2010 contest versus the Ontario Women's Hockey Association (OWHA) All-Stars. She scored the game's first goal for Team Canada, as the OWHA All-Stars defeated the under-18 team by a 3–2 tally.

Campbell led Canada's national under-18 team to a gold medal at the 2010 IIHF Women's U18 World Championship in Chicago. She was team captain, led all players in scoring, and scored the game-winning goal in overtime of the gold medal game against the United States. For her efforts, she was named Most valuable player by the tournament directorate and was selected as a top-three player for Canada by the coaches. As a member of the gold medal-winning squad, she was featured on a hockey card in the Upper Deck 2010 World of Sportscard series. In addition, she participated in the Canada Celebrates Event on June 30 in Edmonton, Alberta which recognized the Canadian Olympic and Worlds champions from the 2009–10 ice hockey season.

== Coaching career ==
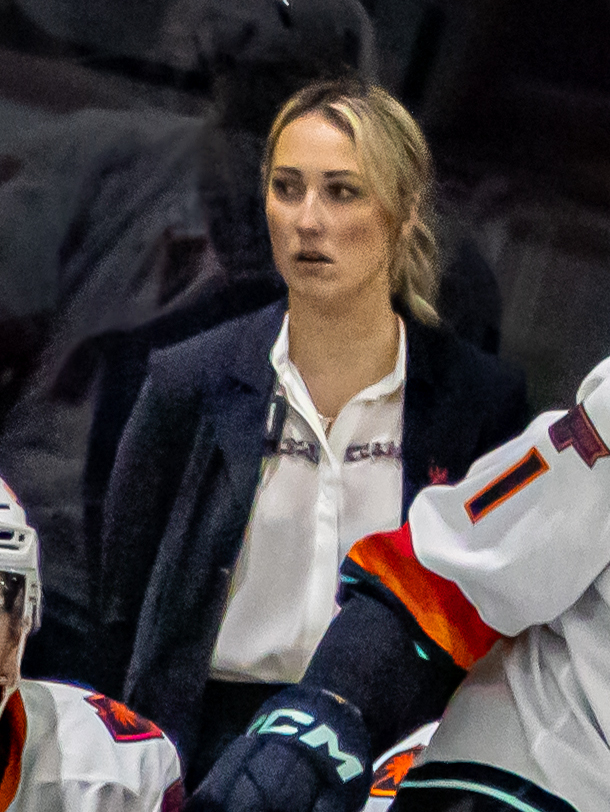
Campbell as assistant coach for the Coachella Valley Firebirds in 2022

After retiring from the Canadian national team in 2017, Campbell began coaching. She originally coached high school girls' hockey before launching her own coaching business. As owner of JC Powerskating, her clientele included Tyson Jost, Stanley Cup champion Joel Edmundson, and Olympic gold medallist Natalie Spooner.

In 2021, she was an assistant coach for the Nürnberg Ice Tigers, and also served as an assistant coach for the German national team at the men's world championship. She was the first woman to be a coach at the men's world championship.

In July 2022, she was hired as assistant coach of the Coachella Valley Firebirds, the top minor league affiliate of the NHL's Seattle Kraken. In her new role, she became the first woman to be employed on a full-time basis as a behind-the-bench coach in the AHL.

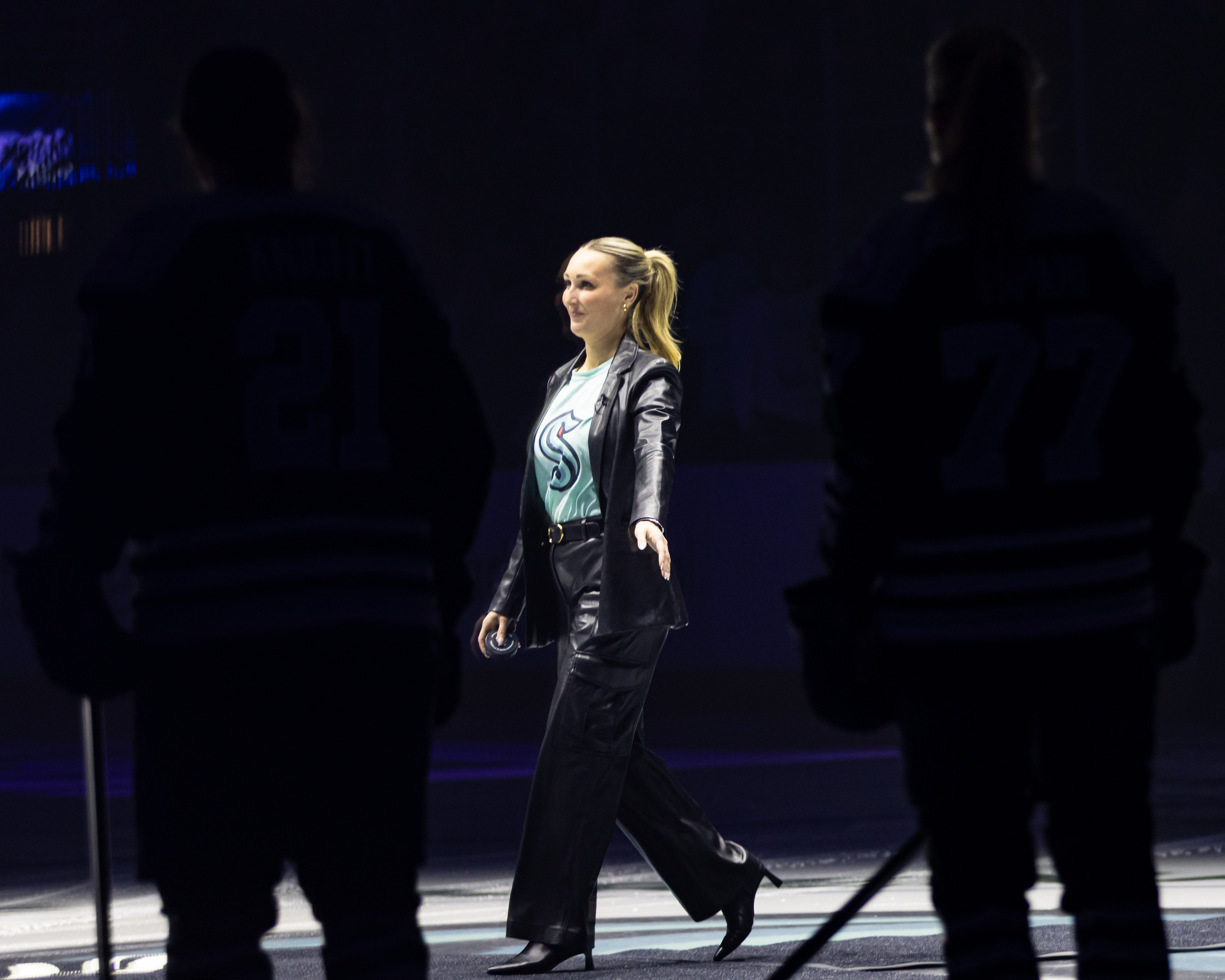
Campbell in 2025

On July 3, 2024, Campbell was hired to be the assistant coach for the Seattle Kraken, making her the first female assistant coach in NHL history. Campbell worked with head coach Dan Bylsma with the Firebirds. She made her debut as assistant coach during the team's regular season opener on October 8.

On April 30, 2026, the Kraken announced Campbell would be leaving her assistant coach position with the team on an expiring contract, opting to pursue other NHL coaching opportunities.

On September 16, 2026, Campbell was named the manager of player development for the New Jersey Devils.

== Personal life ==
Campbell is the youngest of four children. Her mother, Monique Campbell, played hockey at the University of Saskatchewan; her father also played. Campbell's older siblings all also played hockey.

Campbell participated in the sixth season of Battle of the Blades, a Canadian reality show in which ice hockey players are teamed up with figure skaters and perform pair routines in front of a panel of judges each week to win money for their selected charities. She was paired with ice dancer Asher Hill and the team skated for the mental health advocacy organization Do It For Daron. Campbell and Hill were the runners up to the season’s champions, Meagan Duhamel and Wojtek Wolski.

In 2023, Campbell was announced as a brand ambassador for Can-i Wellness oral spray supplements.

== Career statistics ==
=== Regular season and playoffs ===
			Regular season					Playoffs
Season	Team	League	GP	G	A	Pts	PIM	GP	G	A	Pts	PIM
2006–07	Melville Prairie Fire	SFMAAAHL	28	16	7	23	44	3	0	0	0	8
2007–08	Melville Prairie Fire	SFMAAAHL	28	27	9	36	44	4	2	1	3	8
2008–09	Pursuit of Excellence	CAN-HS	30	54	16	70		–	–	–	–	–
2009–10	Pursuit of Excellence	CAN-HS	41	57	47	104		–	–	–	–	–
2010–11	Cornell Big Red	NCAA	31	11	15	26	18	–	–	–	–	–
2011–12	Cornell Big Red	NCAA	33	5	9	14	18	–	–	–	–	–
2012–13	Cornell Big Red	NCAA	34	16	8	24	38	–	–	–	–	–
2013–14	Cornell Big Red	NCAA	33	14	22	36	47	–	–	–	–	–
2014–15	Calgary Inferno	CWHL	21	12	5	17	4	2	0	0	0	0
2015–16	Calgary Inferno	CWHL	22	10	10	20	6	3	2	0	2	0
2016–17	Calgary Inferno	CWHL	20	7	6	13	16	–	–	–	–	–
2017–2019	Did not play
2019–20	Malmö Redhawks	Damettan	5	10	2	12	16	6	4	1	5	4
NCAA totals			131	46	54	100	121	–	–	–	–	–
CWHL totals			63	29	21	50	26	5	2	0	2	0

=== International ===
Year	Team	Event	Result	GP	G	A	Pts	PIM
2009	Canada U18	WW18	2nd place, silver medalist(s)	5	2	7	9	0
2010	Canada U18	WW18	1st place, gold medalist(s)	5	7	8	15	4
2015	Canada	WW	2nd place, silver medalist(s)	5	0	0	0	4

== Awards and honours ==
=== International ===
- World U18 Championship Silver Medal: 2009
- World U18 Championship Gold Medal: 2010
- World U18 Championship Most Valuable Player: 2010
- World U18 Championship Top-3 Player on Team: 2010
- World Championship Silver Medal: 2015

=== College ===
- ECAC Hockey Rookie of the Week: Week of October 25, 2010

=== Professional ===
- CWHL All-Star Game Selection: 2014–15, 2015–16
- Clarkson Cup Champion: 2016
