= Brianna Decker =

American ice hockey player (born 1991)

- Hockey Hall of Fame, 2025
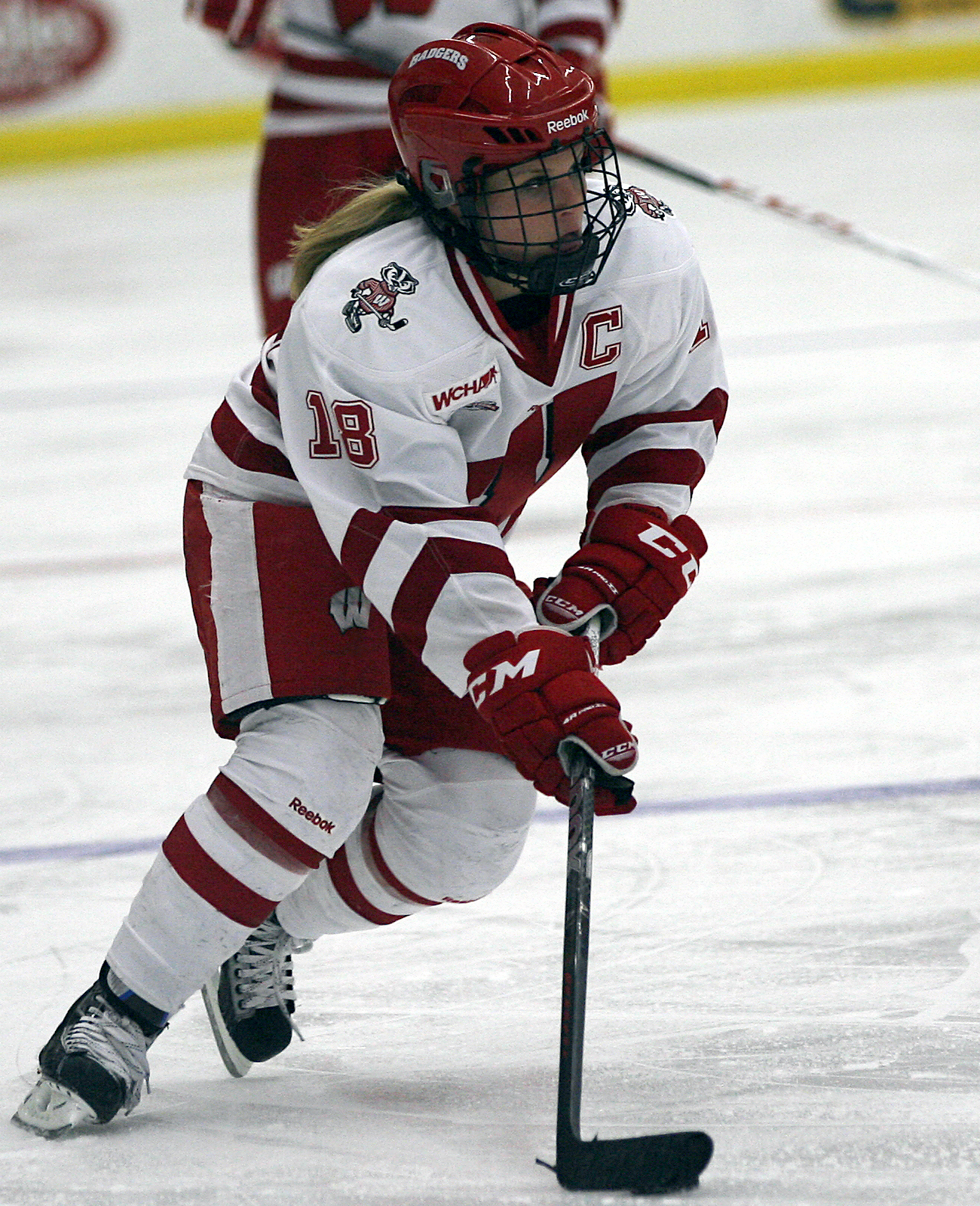
- Decker with the Wisconsin Badgers in 2013
- Born: May 13, 1991 (age 35) Dousman, Wisconsin, U.S.
- Height: 5 ft 4 in (163 cm)
- Weight: 148 lb (67 kg; 10 st 8 lb)
- Position: Forward
- Shot: Right
- Played for: PWHPA; Calgary Inferno; Boston Pride; Boston Blades; Wisconsin Badgers
- National team: United States
- Playing career: 2009–2023
Medal record
Representing United States
Women's ice hockey
Olympic Games
Gold medal – first place	2018 Pyeongchang	Team
Silver medal – second place	2014 Sochi	Team
Silver medal – second place	2022 Beijing	Team
IIHF World Women's Championships
Gold medal – first place	2011 Switzerland
Gold medal – first place	2013 Canada
Gold medal – first place	2015 Sweden
Gold medal – first place	2016 Canada
Gold medal – first place	2017 United States
Gold medal – first place	2019 Finland
Silver medal – second place	2012 United States
Silver medal – second place	2021 Canada

Brianna Decker (born May 13, 1991) is an American former professional ice hockey forward who is currently an assistant coach for the Minnesota Frost of the Professional Women's Hockey League (PWHL). She played for the Boston Blades, Boston Pride, Calgary Inferno, Professional Women's Hockey Players Association, and United States women's national ice hockey team. She played college ice hockey at Wisconsin and won the 2012 Patty Kazmaier Award. With the Boston Pride, she scored the first hat trick in NWHL history on October 25, 2015. Decker was inducted into the Hockey Hall of Fame in 2025.

== Playing career ==
=== NCAA ===
In her freshman season (2009–10) with the Wisconsin Badgers women's ice hockey program, Decker scored the Badgers' first goal of the season in a game against North Dakota (October 3). During the season, she accumulated seven multi-point games and four multi-goal games. She was third in team scoring despite missing almost half of the first part of the season. On September 25, 2011, Decker scored her third career hat trick in a 13–0 defeat of the Lindenwood Lady Lions ice hockey program. Her 12-game winning goals during the 2010–11 season are a program record. She holds the Badgers' longest scoring streak at 32 games (February 11, 2011 to January 6, 2012). She accumulated 77 points (33 goals, 44 assists) during the streak. In her junior season, Decker won the 2012 Patty Kazmaier Award.

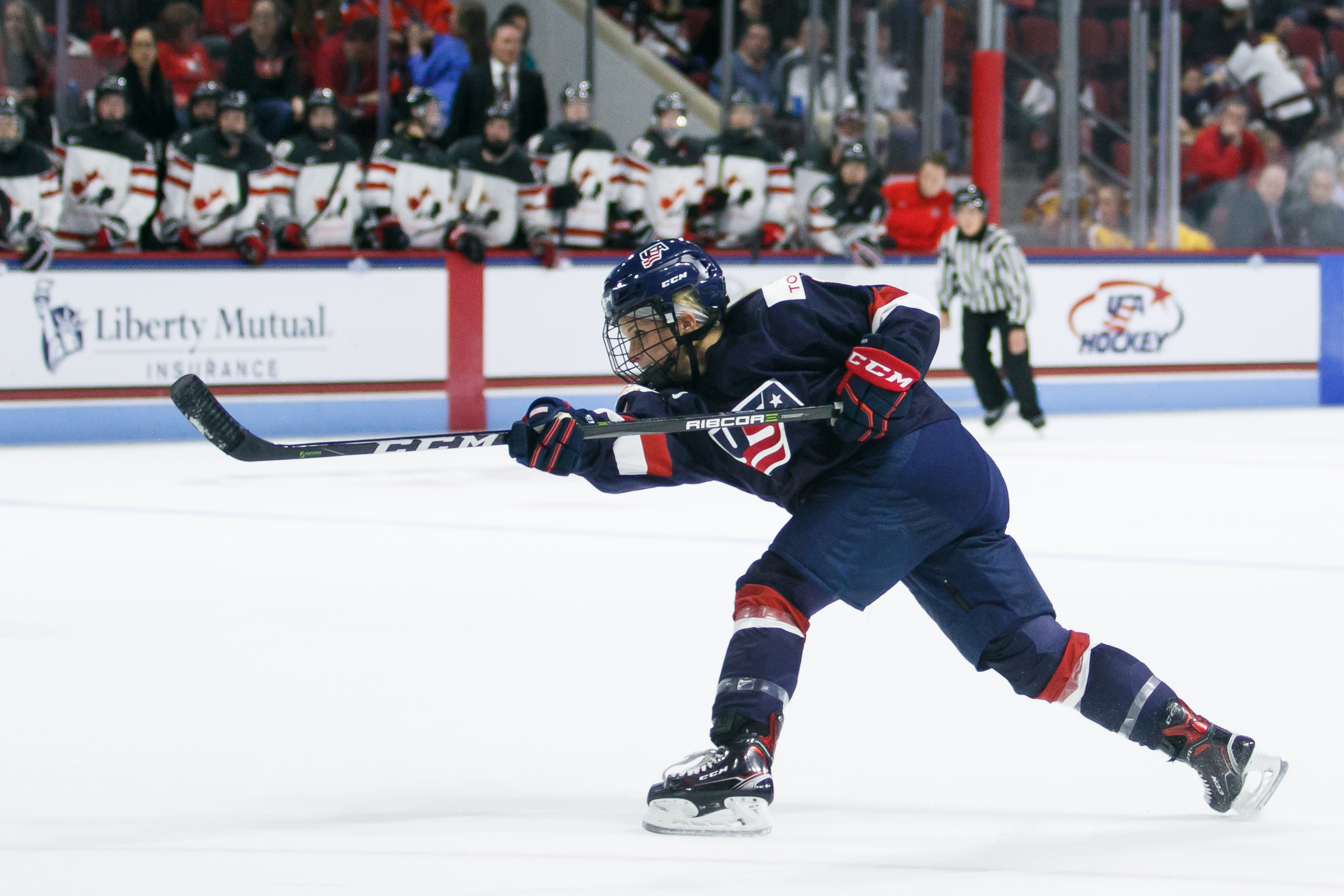
Brianna Decker playing for Team USA in 2017

=== USA Hockey ===
She won gold at the 2009 IIHF World Women's U18 Championship. On January 28, 2011, it was announced that Decker was named to the preliminary roster for the US Women's National Team. From April 4 to 12, 2011, she was one of 30 players that took part in a selection/training camp and was named to the final roster that participated at the 2011 IIHF Women's World Championship. At the 2011 IIHF Women's World Championship, Brianna Decker was among the tournament's top five scorers. Decker's 11 points (four goals, seven assists) placed her second.

In 2017, Decker was a member of the winning US team for the 2017 IIHF Women's World Championship, receiving two assists in the final against Canada.

On January 2, 2022, Decker was named to Team USA's roster to represent the United States at the 2022 Winter Olympics after having been a top scorer for the team at the two previous Olympic Games and earning a silver (2014) and gold medal (2018).

In the opening preliminary round 5-2 victory over Finland on February 3, Decker suffered a knee injury in the middle of the first period and was ruled out of the Olympics. Decker announced her retirement from USA Hockey on March 2, 2023. She finished her career with 81 goals and 170 points in 147 games, and was fourth in IIHF Women's World Championship all-time scoring with 68 points.

=== Professional ===
==== CWHL ====
Making her debut for the Boston Blades on January 17, 2015, Decker accumulated seven points (three goals, four assists) in an 11–3 win against the Brampton Thunder. Decker would finish the season leading all American-born players in scoring while ranking second overall in the scoring race for the Angela James Bowl with 32 points. In addition, she tied with Blades teammate Tara Watchorn as the league leader in plus/minus rating with a +25. During the 2015 Clarkson Cup playoffs, Decker led all players in scoring while registering two goals in the championship game, a 3–2 overtime win over the Montreal Stars.

==== NWHL ====
Signing as a free agent with the Boston Pride of the National Women's Hockey League, Decker made league history on October 25, 2015. During a 5–3 road win against the Buffalo Beauts, Decker would score the first hat trick in league history. All three goals were scored against Beauts goaltender Brianne McLaughlin.

Decker was awarded Most Valuable Player consecutively by the NWHL for her performance in the 2015–16 season and 2016–17 season.

==== Return to CWHL ====
On July 24, 2018, Decker and fellow Team USA gold medalist Kacey Bellamy signed as free agents with the Calgary Inferno. Decker would score the game-winning goal versus Les Canadiennes de Montreal in the 2019 Clarkson Cup finals, with Bellamy gaining the assist. Of note, Decker would also be recognized as the MVP of the 2019 Clarkson Cup playoffs.

==== NHL ====
On January 25, 2019, Decker participated in the NHL All-Star Skills Competition, where she demonstrated the premier passing drill event. Her demo time of 1:06 was faster than all eight men who competed in the event. The $25,000 prize money went to Leon Draisaitl, who finished at 1:09. Ice hockey equipment manufacturer CCM announced that it would pay Decker $25,000 for achieving the fastest time.

=== PWHPA ===
Decker participated in the #ForTheGame movement in connection with the PWHPA, beginning in May 2019. She played for Team Johnston in PWHPA's Dream Gap exhibition tour.

Skating for Team New Hampshire during the 2020–21 PWHPA season, Decker participated in a PWHPA Dream Gap Tour event at New York's Madison Square Garden on February 28, 2021, the first women's ice hockey event at the venue. Playing for a team sponsored by the Women's Sports Foundation, Decker recorded two goals and two assists in a 4-3 win, earning the First Star of the Game.

== Coaching career ==
In 2024, Decker joined the USA U18 women's team as an Assistant coach. She is also an Associate Head Coach for the Shattuck-St. Mary's Girls Prep team, where she previously played as a teenager. On August 22, 2025, she was named an assistant coach for the Minnesota Frost of the PWHL.

== Personal life ==
Brianna has three brothers, Bryan, Ben and Brody, and grew up playing hockey alongside them. She has two step-kids with her wife. At the University of Wisconsin Decker earned a degree in human development and family studies.

== Career statistics ==
=== Regular season and playoffs ===
			Regular season					Playoffs
Season	Team	League	GP	G	A	Pts	PIM	GP	G	A	Pts	PIM
2009–10	University of Wisconsin	WCHA	27	15	12	27	20	—	—	—	—	—
2010–11	University of Wisconsin	WCHA	41	34	46	80	18	—	—	—	—	—
2011–12	University of Wisconsin	WCHA	40	37	45	82	47	—	—	—	—	—
2012–13	University of Wisconsin	WCHA	35	29	26	55	40	—	—	—	—	—
2014–15	Boston Blades	CWHL	12	16	16	32	10	3	5	3	8	10
2015–16	Boston Pride	NWHL	16	14	15	29	20	5	4	5	9	6
2016–17	Boston Pride	NWHL	17	14	17	31	14	2	1	4	5	2
2018–19	Calgary Inferno	CWHL	23	12	14	26	18	4	3	0	3	4
2020–21	Calgary	PWHPA	6	3	5	8	6	—	—	—	—	—
NWHL totals			33	28	32	60	34	6	6	8	14	8
CWHL totals			35	28	30	58	28	7	8	3	11	14

=== International ===
Year	Team	Event	Result	GP	G	A	Pts	PIM
2008	United States	U18	1st place, gold medalist(s)	5	3	4	7	2
2009	United States	U18	1st place, gold medalist(s)	5	8	1	9	4
2011	United States	WC	1st place, gold medalist(s)	5	4	7	11	8
2012	United States	WC	2nd place, silver medalist(s)	5	4	6	10	6
2013	United States	WC	1st place, gold medalist(s)	5	6	2	8	4
2014	United States	OG	2nd place, silver medalist(s)	5	2	4	6	6
2015	United States	WC	1st place, gold medalist(s)	5	5	6	11	0
2016	United States	WC	1st place, gold medalist(s)	5	2	4	6	2
2017	United States	WC	1st place, gold medalist(s)	5	3	9	12	8
2018	United States	OG	1st place, gold medalist(s)	5	0	3	3	6
2019	United States	WC	1st place, gold medalist(s)	7	2	3	5	2
2021	United States	WC	2nd place, silver medalist(s)	7	2	3	5	6
2022	United States	OG	2nd place, silver medalist(s)	1	0	0	0	0
Junior totals				10	11	5	16	6
Senior totals				55	30	47	77	48

== Awards and honors ==
=== NCAA ===
- Patty Kazmaier Memorial Award winner (2012)
- RBK Hockey/AHCA Division I second-team All-American (2010–11)
- All-WCHA First Team (2010–11)
- WCHA Final Face-off Most Valuable Player (2010–11)
- All-WCHA Rookie Team (2009–10)
- three-time WCHA Rookie of the Week (2009–10)
- WCHA Preseason Rookie of the Year (2009–10)
- Badgers Rookie of the Year (2009–10)
- All-WCHA Academic Team (2010–11)
- WCHA Rookie of the Week (Week of October 5, 2009)
- 2012 Wisconsin Offensive Player of the Year Award

=== CWHL ===
- CWHL co-leader, Plus-Minus rating +25 (2014–15)
- CWHL Scoring Leader among American-born players (2014–15)
- 2015 CWHL Rookie of the Year Award Winner
- 2019 Clarkson Cup Playoff MVP

=== IIHF ===
- Inductee into the 2014 Winter Olympics for the US team

=== NWHL ===
- Isobel Cup Playoffs Most Valuable Player Award (2016)
- NWHL Most Valuable Player Award (2016)

=== USA Hockey ===
- Bob Allen Women's Player of the Year Award (2015, 2017)

Awards and achievements
Preceded by Meghan Duggan	Patty Kazmaier Award; 2011–12	Succeeded by Amanda Kessel
