= Laurie Kingsbury =

Canadian ice hockey player

- Born: May 18, 1992 (age 34) Salaberry-de-Valleyfield, Quebec, Canada
- Height: 5 ft 9 in (175 cm)
- Weight: 140 lb (64 kg; 10 st 0 lb)
- Position: Forward
- Shot: Right
- Played for: Syracuse
- National team: Canada
- Playing career: 2011–2012

Laurie Kingsbury
Medal record

Women's ice hockey

Representing Canada

IIHF U18 Women's World
Silver medal – second place	2009 Germany	2009 Tournament
Gold medal – first place	2010 United States	2010 Tournament

Laurie Kingsbury (born May 18, 1992) is a Canadian former ice hockey player who has competed for the Canadian National Women's Under 18 team.

== Playing career ==
She was one of four players from Quebec, (along with Melodie Daoust, Roxanne Douville and Marie-Philip Poulin), who represented Canada at the 2009 IIHF World Women's U18 Championship in Germany. Daoust was a Montreal Canadiens scholarship holder in 2010 from the Quebec Foundation for Athletic Excellence. Kingsbury was part of Canada's National Women's Under-18 Team to a gold medal at the 2010 IIHF World Women's Under-18 Championship in Chicago. As a member of the gold medal winning squad, a hockey card of her was featured in the Upper Deck 2010 World of Sports card series. In addition, she participated in the Canada Celebrates Event on June 30 in Edmonton, Alberta which recognized the Canadian Olympic and World hockey champions from the 2009–10 season .

== Career stats ==
=== Hockey Canada ===
Year	Event	GP	G	A	PTS	PIM
2008	National U18 championships	5	2	1	3	2
