= Lisa Hedengren =

Swedish ice hockey player

- Born: 14 February 1992 (age 34)
- Height: 1.72 m (5 ft 8 in)
- Weight: 78 kg (172 lb; 12 st 4 lb)
- Position: Forward
- Shoots: Left
- RKS team: AIK IF
- National team: Sweden
- Playing career: 2007–present

Lisa Hedengren (born 14 February 1992) is a Swedish ice hockey player for AIK IF and the Swedish national team. She participated at the 2015 IIHF Women's World Championship.
