= Taylor Wasylk =

American ice hockey player (born 1992)

- Born: February 21, 1992 (age 34) Port Huron, Michigan, USA
- Height: 5 ft 10 in (178 cm)
- Weight: 148 lb (67 kg; 10 st 8 lb)
- Position: Forward
- Shot: Left
- Played for: Boston College
- National team: United States
- Playing career: 2010–2022
Medal record
Representing United States
Women's ice hockey
IIHF World Women's Championships
Silver medal – second place	2012 United States	Tournament

Taylor Wasylk (born February 21, 1992) is an American ice hockey coach and former player. She was named to the United States women's national ice hockey team which represented the United States at the 2012 IIHF Women's World Championship. She currently competes for the Boston College Eagles women's ice hockey program in the NCAA. In addition, she was honored as valedictorian of her graduating class from Port Huron Northern High School in 2010.

== Playing career ==
Before Boston College, Wasylk played for the Detroit Little Caesar's Triple AAA Hockey Club and Detroit HoneyBaked AAA Hockey Club.

=== Boston College ===
Wasylk made her debut for the Eagles during the 2010–11 Boston College Eagles women's ice hockey season. Taylor Wasylk scored a goal and assisted on Kelli Stack's goal as the Eagles tied Quinnipiac 3–3. Against Brown, she scored twice as the Eagles prevailed by a 5–2 mark. She fired 13 shots on goal in the two contests and earned a +6 plus/minus rating. For her efforts, she was recognized as Hockey East Rookie of the Week for the third consecutive week. Wasylk's honor marks the first time in Boston College Eagles women's ice hockey history that a player has won a league award for three consecutive weeks.

=== USA Hockey ===
On November 24, 2008, Wasylk was named to the National Under 18 team. She was a gold medalist with Team USA at the 2009 U-18 World Championships. On January 10, 2009, in Fussen, Germany, Taylor Wasylk scored the second goal for the US in the gold medal game of the 2009 IIHF Under 19 championships. Ammerman would go on to win the gold medal in the event. At the 2010 U-18 Worlds, Wasylk was part of the silver medal-winning team. On December 9, 2010, Wasylk was one of forty players who were invited to try out for the United States National Women's Ice Hockey team.

== Awards and honors ==
- Hockey East Rookie of the Week (Week of October 11, 2010)
- Hockey East Rookie of the Week (Week of October 18, 2010)
- Hockey East Rookie of the Week (Week of October 2, 2015)
