= Brigette Lacquette =

Canadian ice hockey player

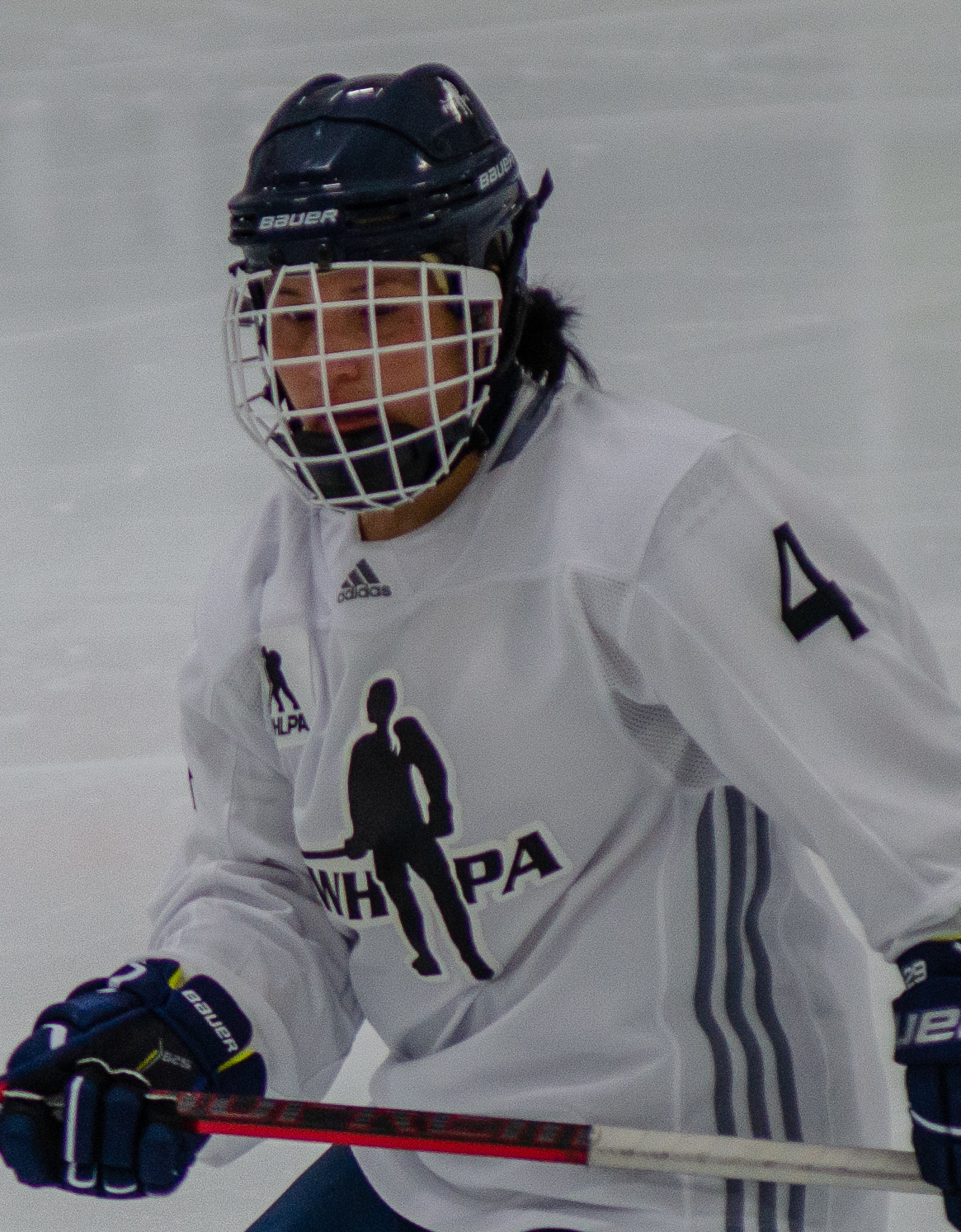
- Lacquette in 2019
- Born: November 10, 1992 (age 33) Dauphin, Manitoba, Canada
- Height: 5 ft 6 in (168 cm)
- Weight: 181 lb (82 kg; 12 st 13 lb)
- Position: Defence
- Shoots: Right
- PWHPA team Former teams: Calgary; Calgary Inferno; Manitoba Bisons; Minnesota Duluth Bulldogs
- National team: Canada
- Playing career: 2011–present
Medal record
Olympic Games
Silver medal – second place	2018 Pyeongchang	Team
World Championships
Silver medal – second place	2015 Sweden
Silver medal – second place	2016 Canada
Bronze medal – third place	2019 Finland

Brigette Lacquette (born November 10, 1992) is a Canadian ice hockey player, currently playing defence for the Calgary section of the PWHPA and the Canadian national team. She participated at the 2015 IIHF Women's World Championship. In the autumn of 2015, Lacquette joined the Calgary Inferno of the CWHL.

In 2018, Lacquette became the first First Nations woman to play for the Canadian women's Olympic hockey team. To honour her accomplishment, Lacquette's Olympic hockey stick was included in the diversity exhibit in the Hockey Hall of Fame in 2018. Along with Sarah Nurse and Hanna Bunton, Lacquette joined them on the cover (dated June 2021) of Elle Canada.

In December 2021, Lacquette was also hired by the Chicago Blackhawks as a scout covering players in clubs of the Western Hockey League. She received the Inspire Award in the sports category in 2019.

== Early life ==
Lacquette grew up in the remote Métis community of Mallard, Manitoba. Her father is from the O-Chi-Chak Ko Sipi First Nation of Manitoba, while her mother is from the Cote First Nation in Saskatchewan. Lacquette has a sister named Tara and a brother named Taren, both of whom also play hockey.

Lacquette began skating at the age of four, and was soon introduced to hockey by her father and cousins. Since there were no hockey rinks in Mallard, Lacquette's father built one in their family yard. By the time she was five, her father began taking her to the nearest indoor rink, located in the community of Winnipegosis.

Lacquette described facing racism at hockey games. At the age of twelve, she played a tournament in Winnipeg where she encountered taunts such as "dirty Indian" and "go back to the reserve". She described how hateful comments came from opponents, tournament attendees, and even a few of her own teammates. She was supported by her father to continue playing hockey. Lacquette's father has expressed pride at his daughter's perseverance: "She basically kicked that door over and knocked it down and it's not a barrier anymore in her life."

Lacquette said her role model growing up was fellow aboriginal hockey athlete, Jordin Tootoo.

== Playing career ==
=== Canada women's national under-18 ice hockey team ===
Lacquette joined the National Women's U18 Team in 2008. The team won silver and gold at the 2009 and 2010 IIHF U18 Women's World Championship. She was cited as a leading scorer in the 2010 series, alongside teammate Jessica Campbell.

She won a Tom Longboat Award in 2009 for being the nation's top female amateur Aboriginal athlete.

=== Collegiate ===
Lacquette played for the University of Manitoba Bisons and at the NCAA level at the University of Minnesota Duluth. Shannon Miller, a former head hockey coach at the University of Minnesota Duluth, has described Lacquette as "the most naturally talented player to ever come through our program." Lacquette was the first Ojibway/Anishnabe in UMD hockey history.

=== Canada women's national ice hockey team ===
Lacquette was the first First Nations hockey player to be named to Canada's National Women's Team.

Her first appearance with the team was in 2013 at the Four Nations Cup tournament held in Lake Placid, United States.

She made her IIHF Women's World Championship debut in 2015, winning the first of two back-to-back silver medals with Canada. In 2015, Lacquette played her first IIHF Women's World Championship with team Canada in Sweden, where Canada finished second to the United States.

=== Canadian Women's Hockey League ===
After graduation, she joined Calgary of the CWHL, who had selected her 24th overall in the 2015 Draft. Appearing with the Calgary Inferno in the 2016 Clarkson Cup finals, Lacquette earned an assist as the Inferno emerged victorious in a convincing 8–3 final. In 2019, Lacquette led all CWHL players in an online vote, gaining the opportunity to serve as a captain at the 4th Canadian Women's Hockey League All-Star Game.

=== Olympics ===
She made her Olympic debut playing defence at the 2018 Winter Olympics in Pyeongchang, where Canada won the silver medal.

She was the first First Nations woman to join the Canadian women's Olympic hockey team.

== Advocacy and impact ==
Lacquette is a partner athlete with the sports mentorship organization Classroom Champions. As a participant of the organization's "Circle" program, which connects athletes and youth of Indigenous heritage, Lacquette has provided mentorship to children from the Piitoayis (Eagle Lodge) Family School in Inglewood, Calgary.

Lacquette has been described as a role model to First Nations youth in Canada. "I'm super excited to be that role model for those kids. Growing up I really didn't have that female role model to look up to," said Lacquette. She received the Inspire Award in the sports category in 2019.

== Career stats ==
=== Team Canada ===
- In progress

Year	Event	Games played	Goals	Assists	Points	PIM	Result
2010	U18 IIHF WWC	5	2	11	13	6	Gold
2010	U22 vs USA (exhibition)	3	0	1	1	0	
2013	U22 Meco Cup	4	1	2	3	2	Gold
2015	4 Nations Cup	3	0	1	1	6	Silver
2016	NWDT Nations Cup	6	0	3	3	4	Gold
2016	4 Nations Cup	4	1	0	1	2	Silver
2017	4 Nations Cup	3	0	6	5	2	Silver
2018	PyeongChang Winter Games	5	0	1	1	2	Silver
2019	vs Team USA (exhibition)	3	0	1	1	2	

== Awards and honors ==
- Top Defenceman for her performance at the 2010 IIHF World Women's Under-18 Championships. Where she also helped lead Canada to its first gold medal at the Under-18 Championships after assisting the overtime winner.
- 2016 Clarkson Cup champion
- 2019 Indspire Award, Sports
