= Canada women's national under-18 ice hockey team =

Canada
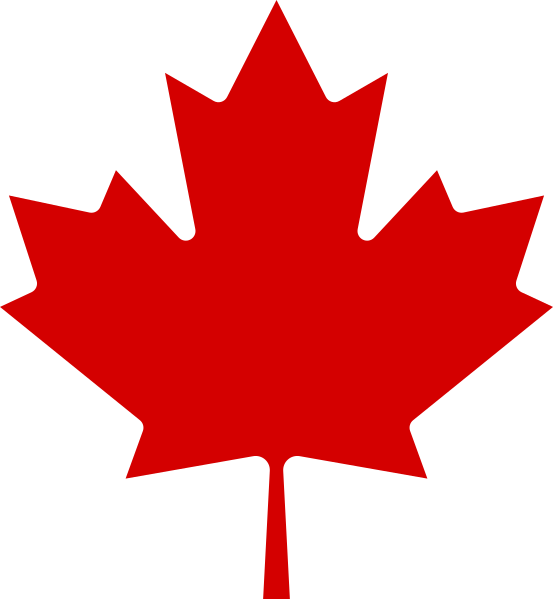
- Nickname: Team Canada (Équipe Canada)
- Association: Hockey Canada
- Head coach: Vicky Sunohara
- Assistants: Marc-André Côté; Stefanie McKeough
- Captain: Chloe Primerano
- Most games: Erin Ambrose (15)
- Top scorer: Marie-Philip Poulin (13)
- Most points: Marie-Philip Poulin (26)
- Team colours
- IIHF code: CAN

First international
- Canada 11 – 2 Czech Republic (Calgary, Canada; January 7, 2008)

Biggest win
- Canada 17 – 0 Finland (Calgary, Canada; January 9, 2008); Canada 17 – 0 Japan (Vantaa, Finland; January 9, 2025)

Biggest defeat
- United States 6 – 2 Canada (Dmitrov, Russia; January 9, 2018)

IIHF World Women's U18 Championships
- Appearances: 17 (first in 2008)
- Best result: (gold) Gold: 8 (2010, 2012, 2013, 2014, 2019, 2022, 2023, 2025)

International record (W–L–T)
- 50–11–0

Medal record

World U18 Championship
Gold medal – first place	2010 USA	
Gold medal – first place	2012 Czech Republic	
Gold medal – first place	2013 Finland	
Gold medal – first place	2014 Hungary	
Gold medal – first place	2019 Japan	
Gold medal – first place	2022 USA	
Gold medal – first place	2023 Sweden	
Gold medal – first place	2025 Finland	
Silver medal – second place	2008 Canada	
Silver medal – second place	2009 Germany	
Silver medal – second place	2011 Sweden	
Silver medal – second place	2015 USA	
Silver medal – second place	2016 Canada	
Silver medal – second place	2017 Czech Republic	
Silver medal – second place	2020 Slovakia	
Silver medal – second place	2026 Canada	
Bronze medal – third place	2018 Russia	
Bronze medal – third place	2024 Switzerland	

The Canadian women's national under-18 ice hockey team is the national under-18 ice hockey team for women in Canada. The team represents Canada at the International Ice Hockey Federation's IIHF World Women's U18 Championships.

== World Women's U18 Championship record ==
Year	GP	W	OTW	OTL	L	GF	GA	Pts	Rank
2008	5	4	0	0	1	47	9	12	2nd place, silver medalist(s)
2009	5	4	0	1	0	43	5	13	2nd place, silver medalist(s)
2010	5	4	1	0	0	44	7	14	1st place, gold medalist(s)
2011	5	4	0	0	1	31	8	12	2nd place, silver medalist(s)
2012	5	5	0	0	0	36	1	15	1st place, gold medalist(s)
2013	5	4	1	0	0	24	4	14	1st place, gold medalist(s)
2014	5	4	1	0	0	25	2	14	1st place, gold medalist(s)
2015	5	3	0	2	0	16	9	11	2nd place, silver medalist(s)
2016	5	3	0	1	1	23	9	10	2nd place, silver medalist(s)
2017	5	3	1	0	1	17	8	11	2nd place, silver medalist(s)
2018	6	3	0	1	2	19	15	10	3rd place, bronze medalist(s)
2019	5	2	2	0	1	16	10	10	1st place, gold medalist(s)
2020	5	3	1	1	0	14	7	12	2nd place, silver medalist(s)
2022	6	4	0	0	2	15	13	12	1st place, gold medalist(s)
2023	5	4	1	0	0	28	5	14	1st place, gold medalist(s)
2024	6	5	0	0	1	45	6	15	3rd place, bronze medalist(s)
2025	6	6	0	0	0	40	5	18	1st place, gold medalist(s)
2026	6	5	0	0	1	52	5	15	2nd place, silver medalist(s)

== Awards and honours ==
- 2008 IIHF World Women's U18 Championship Directorate Award, Best Defenceman: (Canada) Lauriane Rougeau
- 2008 IIHF World Women's U18 Championship Directorate Award, Best Forward: (Canada) Marie-Philip Poulin
- 2010 IIHF World Women's U18 Championship Directorate Award, Most Valuable Player: (Canada) Jessica Campbell
- 2010 IIHF World Women's U18 Championship Directorate Award, Best Defenceman: (Canada) Brigette Lacquette
- 2010 IIHF World Women's U18 championship Leading scorer: (Canada) Jessica Campbell
- 2013 IIHF World Women's U18 Championship Media All-Star Team: (Canada) Kimberly Newell
- 2013 IIHF World Women's U18 Championship Media All-Star Team: (Canada) Halli Kryzyzaniak
- 2015 IIHF World Women's U18 Championship Media All-Star Team: (Canada) Sarah Potomak
- 2015 IIHF World Women's U18 Championship Media All-Star Team: (Canada) Micah Zandee-Hart
- 2016 IIHF World Women's U18 Championship Media All-Star Team: (Canada) Ashton Bell
- 2017 IIHF World Women's U18 Championship Directorate Award, Best Defenceman: (Canada) Sophie Shirley
- 2018 IIHF World Women's U18 Championship Media All-Star Team: (Canada) Alexie Guay
- 2019 IIHF World Women's U18 Championship Directorate Award, Best Defenceman and Media All-Star Team: (Canada) Alexie Guay
- 2019 IIHF World Women's U18 Championship Directorate Award, MVP: (Canada) Raygan Kirk
- 2020 IIHF World Women's U18 Championship Media All-Star Team: (Canada) Kendall Cooper
- 2020 IIHF World Women's U18 Championship Media All-Star Team: (Canada) Jenna Buglioni
- 2022 IIHF World Women's U18 Championship Media All-Star Team: (Canada) Sara Swiderski
- 2023 IIHF World Women's U18 Championship Media All-Star Team: (Canada) Caitlin Kraemer
- 2024 IIHF World Women's U18 Championship Directorate Award, Most Valuable Player, Best Defenceman, and Media All-Star Team: (Canada) Chloe Primerano
- 2025 IIHF World Women's U18 Championship Directorate Award, Best Defenceman, and Media All-Star Team: (Canada) Chloe Primerano
- 2025 IIHF World Women's U18 Championship Media All-Star Team: (Canada) Stryker Zablocki

== Current roster ==
Roster for the 2026 U18 Series.

Head coach: Nadine Muzerall

No.	Pos.	Name	Height	Weight	Birthdate	Team
1	G	Maija St-Pierre	1.73 m (5 ft 8 in)	67 kg (148 lb)	March 29, 2009 (age 17)	(Canada) Etobicoke Jr. Dolphins
2	D	Aurora Matt — C	1.7 m (5 ft 7 in)	60 kg (130 lb)	January 27, 2009 (age 17)	(Canada) Durham West Jr. Lightning
3	D	Renee Lapointe	1.7 m (5 ft 7 in)	0 kg (0 lb)	July 28, 2009 (age 17)	(United States) University of Minnesota Duluth
4	F	Tatiana Deblois	1.68 m (5 ft 6 in)	0 kg (0 lb)	May 13, 2010 (age 16)	(Canada) Collège Bourget
5	F	Demi Lazarou	1.63 m (5 ft 4 in)	0 kg (0 lb)	May 5, 2009 (age 17)	(Canada) Central York Jr. Panthers
7	F	Riley Pettit	1.63 m (5 ft 4 in)	0 kg (0 lb)	January 13, 2009 (age 17)	(Canada) Whitby Jr. Wolves
8	D	Whitney Basso	1.68 m (5 ft 6 in)	0 kg (0 lb)	May 10, 2010 (age 16)	(Canada) Etobicoke Jr. Dolphins
10	F	Chloe Martineau	1.65 m (5 ft 5 in)	0 kg (0 lb)	April 6, 2009 (age 17)	(Canada) Ottawa Lady Senators
11	D	Avery Jones — A	1.77 m (5 ft 10 in)	70 kg (150 lb)	July 9, 2009 (age 17)	(Canada) Nepean Jr. Wildcats
12	F	Ryann Chimera	1.7 m (5 ft 7 in)	0 kg (0 lb)	July 12, 2010 (age 16)	(Canada) OHA Edmonton
15	D	Megan Mossey	1.73 m (5 ft 8 in)	77 kg (170 lb)	March 9, 2009 (age 17)	(Canada) Etobicoke Jr. Dolphins
16	F	Madison Lévesque	1.67 m (5 ft 6 in)	60 kg (130 lb)	April 3, 2009 (age 17)	(Canada) Collège Bourget
17	D	Maeve Aird	1.68 m (5 ft 6 in)	0 kg (0 lb)	September 5, 2010 (age 16)	(Canada) Whitby Jr. Wolves
18	F	Madi Bryk	1.78 m (5 ft 10 in)	0 kg (0 lb)	October 20, 2009 (age 17)	(Canada) Etobicoke Jr. Dolphins
19	F	Skylar Ruschpler	1.73 m (5 ft 8 in)	0 kg (0 lb)	January 9, 2009 (age 17)	(Canada) Etobicoke Jr. Dolphins
22	F	Audrey Martone	1.6 m (5 ft 3 in)	0 kg (0 lb)	June 17, 2009 (age 17)	(Canada) Central York Jr. Panthers
23	F	Adrianna Milani — A	1.62 m (5 ft 4 in)	69 kg (152 lb)	March 19, 2009 (age 17)	(United States) University of Minnesota
24	F	Maggie Hughson	1.7 m (5 ft 7 in)	60 kg (130 lb)	January 18, 2009 (age 17)	(Canada) Ottawa Lady Senators
27	D	Raeya Mackie	1.7 m (5 ft 7 in)	0 kg (0 lb)	October 31, 2009 (age 17)	(Canada) Rink Hockey Academy Kelowna
28	F	Savannah Halleran	1.6 m (5 ft 3 in)	0 kg (0 lb)	October 30, 2010 (age 16)	(Canada) Etobicoke Jr. Dolphins
29	D	Jordan Mulvihill	1.65 m (5 ft 5 in)	0 kg (0 lb)	January 28, 2009 (age 17)	(Canada) Nepean Jr. Wildcats
30	G	Claire Hicks	1.7 m (5 ft 7 in)	0 kg (0 lb)	August 19, 2009 (age 17)	(Canada) Central York Jr. Panthers

== See also ==
- IIHF World Women's U18 Championships
