= 2014–15 Union Dutchwomen ice hockey season =

College ice hockey season

2014–15 Union Dutchwomen women's ice hockey season
- Conference: ECAC Hockey
- Home ice: Achilles Center

Record
- Overall: 4–22–8
- Home: 3–9–6
- Road: 1–13–2

Coaches and captains
- Head coach: Claudia Asano-Barcomb
- Assistant coaches: Ali Boe; Liz Keady
- Captain: Christine Valente

The Union Dutchwomen represented Union College in ECAC women's ice hockey during the 2014–15 NCAA Division I women's ice hockey season.

== Recruiting ==
Player	Position	Nationality	Notes
Hannah Erickson	Forward	United States	Played with North American Hockey Academy
Erica Kelly	Forward	Canada	Attended King's-Edgehill School
Caitlin McLaren	Defense	Canada	Played with the Ottawa Lady Senators
Alexx Ridding	Goaltender	Canada	Former Goalie with Barrie Jr. Sharks
Nicole Russell	Forward	United States	Played for Detroit Honeybaked
Brandy Streeter	Defense	United States	Played with the Buffalo Bison

== 2014–15 Dutchwomen ==
No.	Nat.	Player	Class	Pos	Height	DoB	Hometown	Previous team
1		Shenae Lundberg	Senior	G	5' 6" (1.68 m)		Peterborough, New Hampshire	Deerfield Academy
3		Courtney Turner	Junior	F	5' 3" (1.6 m)		Milton, Massachusetts	East Coast Wizards
4		Brandy Streeter	Freshman	D	5' 2" (1.57 m)		Morrisville, New York	Buffalo Bison
5		Elizabeth Otten	Junior	D	5' 7" (1.7 m)		Edina, Minnesota	Edina HS
6		Eastyn Yuen	Sophomore	F	5' 3" (1.6 m)		Winnipeg, Manitoba	Shaftesbury Prep
7		Jessica Kaminsky	Junior	F	5' 6" (1.68 m)		Winnipeg, Manitoba	Pembina Valley Hawks
8		Alex Tancrell-Fontaine	Senior	D	5' 3" (1.6 m)		East Greenwich, Rhode Island	East Greenwich HS
9		Ali Devins	Sophomore	F	5' 5" (1.65 m)		White River Junction, Vermont	Westminster School
10		Nicole Russell	Freshman	F	5' 1" (1.55 m)		Livonia, Michigan	Honeybaked
11		Kelly McGrath	Senior	D	5' 4" (1.63 m)		Chelmsford, Massachusetts	Lawrence Academy
13		Rebecca Babiak	Junior	F	5' 5" (1.65 m)		Winnipeg, Manitoba	Balmoral Hall
14		Haley Welch	Senior	D	5' 7" (1.7 m)		East Amherst, New York	Elmira College
15		Christine Valente (C)	Senior	F	5' 3" (1.6 m)		West Haven, Connecticut	Choate-Rosemary Hall
16		Erica Kelly	Freshman	F	5' 4" (1.63 m)		Buckingham, Quebec	Kings-Edgehill School
17		Jamie Smith	Junior	F	5' 5" (1.65 m)		Stamford, Connecticut	Mid-Fairfield
18		Caitlyn McLaren	Freshman	D	5' 8" (1.73 m)		Metcalfe, Ontario	Ottawa Lady Senators
19		Katie Laughlin	Freshman	F	5' 9" (1.75 m)		Natick, Massachusetts	Assabet Valley
20		Kathryn Davis	Sophomore	D	5' 7" (1.7 m)		Milton, Massachusetts	Lawrence Academy
21		Bryanne Panchuk	Senior	F	5' 1" (1.55 m)		Calgary, Alberta	Edge School
22		Emily Erickson	Junior	F	5' 4" (1.63 m)		Crosslake, Minnesota	North American Hockey Academy
24		Hannah Erickson	Senior	F	5' 1" (1.55 m)		Crosslake, Minnesota	Achiever Academy
27		Kathryn Tomaselli	Sophomore	F	5' 7" (1.7 m)		Cape Coral, Florida	Williston-Northampton
37		Alexx Ridding	Sophomore	G	5' 5" (1.65 m)		Barrie, Ontario	Barrie Jr. Sharks

== Schedule ==
Date	Opponent^{#}	Rank^{#}	Site	Decision	Result	Record
Regular Season
October 3	at RIT*		Gene Polisseni Center • Rochester, NY	Shenae Lundberg	L 1–2	0–1–0
October 4	at RIT*		Gene Polisseni Center • Rochester, NY	Shenae Lundberg	L 0–2	0–2–0
October 10	Connecticut*		Achilles Center • Schenectady, NY	Shenae Lundberg	L 2–4	0–3–0
October 11	Connecticut*		Achilles Center • Schenectady, NY	Shenae Lundberg	W 1–0	1–3–0
October 17	Penn State*		Achilles Center • Schenectady, NY	Shenae Lundberg	L 1–4	1–4–0
October 18	Penn State*		Achilles Center • Schenectady, NY	Shenae Lundberg	T 2–2 ^{OT}	1–4–1
October 24	at Vermont*		Gutterson Fieldhouse • Burlington, VT	Shenae Lundberg	L 0–4	1–5–1
October 25	at Vermont*		Gutterson Fieldhouse • Burlington, VT	Shenae Lundberg	L 0–4	1–6–1
October 31	at Dartmouth		Thompson Arena • Hanover, NH	Shenae Lundberg	L 0–3	1–7–1 (0–1–0)
November 1	at #4 Harvard		Bright-Landry Hockey Center • Allston, MA	Shenae Lundberg	L 2–5	1–8–1 (0–2–0)
November 7	Providence*		Achilles Center • Schenectady, NY	Shenae Lundberg	T 2–2 ^{OT}	1–8–2
November 14	at Princeton		Hobey Baker Memorial Rink • Princeton, NJ	Shenae Lundberg	L 2–3 ^{OT}	1–9–2 (0–3–0)
November 15	at #5 Quinnipiac		TD Bank Sports Center • Hamden, CT	Shenae Lundberg	L 0–5	1–10–2 (0–4–0)
December 2	at Northeastern*		Matthews Arena • Boston, MA	Shenae Lundberg	W 1–0	2–10–2
December 5	Yale		Achilles Center • Schenectady, NY	Shenae Lundberg	L 2–4	2–11–2 (0–5–0)
December 6	Brown		Achilles Center • Schenectady, NY	Shenae Lundberg	W 3–2	3–11–2 (1–5–0)
December 12	Maine*		Achilles Center • Schenectady, NY	Shenae Lundberg	W 2–0	4–11–2
December 13	Maine*		Achilles Center • Schenectady, NY	Shenae Lundberg	T 1–1 ^{OT}	4–11–3
January 2, 2015	#5 Quinnipiac		Achilles Center • Schenectady, NY	Shenae Lundberg	L 0–4	4–12–3 (1–6–0)
January 3	Princeton		Achilles Center • Schenectady, NY	Shenae Lundberg	L 0–3	4–13–3 (1–7–0)
January 9	Dartmouth		Achilles Center • Schenectady, NY	Shenae Lundberg	L 1–7	4–14–3 (1–8–0)
January 10	Harvard		Achilles Center • Schenectady, NY	Shenae Lundberg	L 1–3	4–15–3 (1–9–0)
January 16	at #8 Clarkson		Cheel Arena • Potsdam, NY	Shenae Lundberg	L 0–4	4–16–3 (1–10–0)
January 17	at St. Lawrence		Appleton Arena • Canton, NY	Shenae Lundberg	L 2–4	4–17–3 (1–11–0)
January 23	Rensselaer		Achilles Center • Schenectady, NY	Shenae Lundberg	T 2–2 ^{OT}	4–17–4 (1–11–1)
January 24	at Rensselaer		Houston Field House • Troy, NY	Shenae Lundberg	L 2–4	4–18–4 (1–12–1)
January 30	at Cornell		Lynah Rink • Ithaca, NY	Shenae Lundberg	L 2–8	4–19–4 (1–13–1)
January 31	at Colgate		Starr Rink • Hamilton, NY	Shenae Lundberg	T 2–2 ^{OT}	4–19–5 (1–13–2)
February 6	#8 St. Lawrence		Achilles Center • Schenectady, NY	Shenae Lundberg	T 1–1 ^{OT}	4–19–6 (1–13–3)
February 7	#10 Clarkson		Achilles Center • Schenectady, NY	Shenae Lundberg	L 0–6	4–20–6 (1–14–3)
February 13	at Brown		Meehan Auditorium • Providence, RI	Shenae Lundberg	T 3–3 ^{OT}	4–20–7 (1–14–4)
February 14	at Yale		Ingalls Rink • New Haven, CT	Shenae Lundberg	L 2–4	4–21–7 (1–15–4)
February 20	Colgate		Achilles Center • Schenectady, NY	Shenae Lundberg	T 2–2 ^{OT}	4–21–8 (1–15–5)
February 21	Cornell		Achilles Center • Schenectady, NY	Shenae Lundberg	L 0–4	4–22–8 (1–16–5)
*Non-conference game. ^{#}Rankings from USCHO.com Poll.
