= 2014–15 Boston College Eagles women's ice hockey season =

WHEA Regular season Champions Frozen Four Lost Semifinal Game to Harvard, 1-2
- Conference: 1st WHEA
- Home ice: Kelley Rink

Rankings
- USCHO.com: 3
- USA Today/USA Hockey Magazine: 4

Record
- Overall: 34-3-2
- Home: 19–0–0
- Road: 13–1–2
- Neutral: 2–2–0

Coaches and captains
- Head coach: Katie King-Crowley
- Assistant coaches: Courtney Kennedy
- Captain: Emily Field
- Alternate captain: Emily Pfalzer

The Boston College Eagles represented Boston College in Women's Hockey East Association play during the 2014–15 NCAA Division I women's ice hockey season. The Eagles were repeat qualifiers for the NCAA Tournament. Alex Carpenter would become the first player in BC program history to win the Patty Kazmaier Award.

== Offseason ==
- August 5: Eight members of the Eagles roster were invited to participate at the 2014 USA Hockey Women’s National Festival in Lake Placid, New York. Alex Carpenter, who earned a silver medal at the 2014 Sochi Winter Games were joined by Lexi Bender, Emily Field, Emily Pfalzer, Haley Skarupa, Dana Trivigno, Andie Anastos and Megan Keller. In addition, former Eagles Corinne Boyles and Blake Bolden, the first African-American selected in the first round of the CWHL Draft, also gained invitations.

=== Recruiting ===
| Player | Position | Nationality | Notes |
|---|---|---|---|
| Megan Keller | Defense | United States | Played with Honeybaked U19 |
| Tori Sullivan | Forward | United States | Played with Honeybaked U19 |
| Kali Flanagan | Defense | United States | National Sports Academy |
| Kenzie Kent | Forward | United States | Noble and Greenough School |
| Toni Ann Milano | Defense | United States | North American Hockey Academy |
| Gabriella Switaj | Goaltender | United States | Team Pittsburgh |
| Katie Burt | Goaltender | United States | Team USA U18 |

== Roster ==
=== 2014–15 Eagles ===
| No. | Nat. | Player | Class | Pos | Height | DoB | Hometown | Previous team |
|---|---|---|---|---|---|---|---|---|
| 3 | | Erin Kickham | Senior | F | 5' 5" (1.65 m) | | Needham, Massachusetts |
| 4 | | Megan Keller | Freshman | D | 5' 10" (1.78 m) | | Farmington Hills, Michigan | Honeybaked U19 |
| 5 | | Alex Carpenter | Junior | F | 5' 7" (1.7 m) | | North Reading, Massachusetts | Governor's Academy |
| 6 | | Kaliya Johnson | Junior | D | 5' 7" (1.7 m) | | Chandler, Arizona | North American Hockey Academy |
| 7 | | Kristyn Capizzano | Sophomore | F | 5' 2" (1.57 m) | | Oakville, Ontario | Mississauga Jr. Chiefs |
| 8 | | Dana Trivigno | Junior | F | 5' 4" (1.63 m) | | Setauket, New York | Shattuck-St. Mary's |
| 9 | | Tori Sullivan | Freshman | F | 5' 5" (1.65 m) | | West Bloomfield, Michigan | Honeybaked U19 |
| 10 | | Kali Flanagan | Freshman | D | 5' 5" (1.65 m) | | Burlington, Massachusetts | National Sports Academy |
| 11 | | Lauren Wedell | Sophomore | D | 5' 8" (1.73 m) | | Arden Hills, Minnesota | Minnesota Thoroughbreds |
| 12 | | Kenzie Kent | Freshman | F | 5' 6" (1.68 m) | | Norwell, Massachusetts | Noble and Greenough |
| 13 | | Haley McLain | Freshman | F | 5' 1" (1.55 m) | | Howell, Michigan | Honeybaked U19 |
| 14 | | Emily Pfalzer (C) | Senior | D | 5' 2" (1.57 m) | | Getzville, New York |
| 15 | | Emily Field (C) | Senior | F | 5' 6" (1.68 m) | | Littleton, Massachusetts |
| 17 | | Meghan Grieves | Junior | F | 5' 8" (1.73 m) | | Cary, North Carolina | Culver Academy |
| 18 | | Toni Miano | Freshman | D | 5' 4" (1.63 m) | | Bronx, New York | North American Hockey Academy |
| 19 | | Danielle Doherty | Senior | F | 5' 4" (1.63 m) | | Newton, Massachusetts | Lawrence Academy |
| 21 | | Lexi Bender | Junior | D | 5' 8" (1.73 m) | | Snohomish, Washington | Shattuck-St. Mary's |
| 22 | | Haley Skarupa | Junior | F | 5' 6" (1.68 m) | | Rockville, Maryland | Washington Pride U19 |
| 23 | | Andie Anastos | Sophomore | F | 5' 8" (1.73 m) | | Farmington Hills, Michigan | Honeybaked U19 |
| 28 | | Kate Leary | Senior | F | 5' 2" (1.57 m) | | Seabrook, New Hampshire |
| 32 | | Gabri Switaj | Freshman | G | 5' 3" (1.6 m) | | Kent, Ohio | Culver Academy |
| 33 | | Katie Burt | Freshman | G | 5' 6" (1.68 m) | | Lynn, Massachusetts | Team USA U18 |
| 35 | | Taylor Blake | Junior | G | 5' 7" (1.7 m) | | Swampscott, Massachusetts |

== Schedule ==
| Date | Opponent^{#} | Rank^{#} | Site | Decision | Result | Record |
Regular Season
| October 4 | Syracuse* | #3 | Kelley Rink • Chestnut Hill, MA | Katie Burt | W 10–2 | 1–0–0 |
| October 10 | at St. Lawrence* | #3 | Appleton Arena • Canton, NY | Katie Burt | W 2–1 | 2–0–0 |
| October 11 | at St. Lawrence* | #3 | Appleton Arena • Canton, NY | Katie Burt | T 2–2 ^{OT} | 2–0–1 |
| October 19 | at New Hampshire | #4 | Whittemore Center • Durham, NH | Katie Burt | W 4–0 | 3–0–1 (1–0–0) |
| October 24 | #5 Cornell* | #3 | Kelley Rink • Chestnut Hill, MA | Katie Burt | W 6–2 | 4–0–1 |
| October 25 | #5 Cornell | #3 | Kelley Rink • Chestnut Hill, MA | Katie Burt | W 6–2 | 5–0–1 |
| October 31 | Providence | #2 | Kelley Rink • Chestnut Hill, MA | Katie Burt | W 8–0 | 6–0–1 (2–0–0) |
| November 1 | at Providence | #2 | Schneider Arena • Providence, RI | Katie Burt | W 4–1 | 7–0–1 (3–0–0) |
| November 8 | at Northeastern | #1 | Matthews Arena • Boston, MA | Katie Burt | W 6–1 | 8–0–1 (4–0–0) |
| November 9 | Vermont | #1 | Kelley Rink • Chestnut Hill, MA | Katie Burt | W 4–2 | 9–0–1 (5–0–0) |
| November 15 | New Hampshire | #1 | Kelley Rink • Chestnut Hill, MA | Katie Burt | W 10–0 | 10–0–1 (6–0–0) |
| November 16 | at New Hampshire | #1 | Whittemore Center • Durham, NH | Katie Burt | W 5–0 | 11–0–1 (7–0–0) |
| November 21 | Connecticut | #1 | Kelley Rink • Chestnut Hill, MA | Katie Burt | W 6–1 | 12–0–1 (8–0–0) |
| November 22 | at Connecticut | #1 | Freitas Ice Forum • Storrs, CT | Katie Burt | W 6–0 | 13–0–1 (9–0–0) |
| November 25 | at Yale* | #1 | Ingalls Rink • New Haven, CT | Katie Burt | W 4–0 | 14–0–1 |
| November 28 | #7 Harvard* | #1 | Kelley Rink • Chestnut Hill, MA | Katie Burt | W 10–2 | 15–0–1 |
| December 5 | at Maine | #1 | Alfond Arena • Orono, ME | Katie Burt | W 8–1 | 16–0–1 (10–0–0) |
| December 10 | at Dartmouth* | #1 | Thompson Arena • Hanover, NH | Katie Burt | W 6–1 | 17–0–1 |
| January 7, 2015 | #4 Boston University | #1 | Kelley Rink • Chestnut Hill, MA | Gabri Switaj | W 4–3 | 18–0–1 (11–0–0) |
| January 10 | at Northeastern | #1 | Matthews Arena • Boston, MA | Taylor Blake | W 7–3 | 19–0–1 (12–0–0) |
| January 11 | Northeastern | #1 | Kelley Rink • Chestnut Hill, MA | Taylor Blake | W 9–1 | 20–0–1 (13–0–0) |
| January 17 | at Vermont | #1 | Gutterson Fieldhouse • Burlington, VT | Katie Burt | W 9–1 | 21–0–1 (14–0–0) |
| January 18 | at Vermont | #1 | Gutterson Fieldhouse • Burlington, VT | Katie Burt | W 2–0 | 22–0–1 (15–0–0) |
| January 24 | #3 Quinnipiac* | #1 | Kelley Rink • Chestnut Hill, MA | Katie Burt | W 2–1 | 23–0–1 |
| January 24 | Princeton* | #1 | Kelley Rink • Chestnut Hill, MA | Katie Burt | W 4–2 | 24–0–1 |
| January 30 | at Providence | #1 | Schneider Arena • Providence, RI | Katie Burt | W 4–2 | 25–0–1 (16–0–0) |
| February 3 | vs. Northeastern* | #1 | Bright-Landry Hockey Center • Allston, MA (Beanpot preliminary round) | Katie Burt | W 3–1 | 26–0–1 |
| February 6 | Connecticut | #1 | Kelley Rink • Chestnut Hill, MA | Katie Burt | W 6–0 | 27–0–1 (17–0–0) |
| February 10 | at #4 Harvard* | #1 | Bright-Landry Hockey Center • Allston, MA (Beanpot Championship) | Katie Burt | L 2–3 | 27–1–1 |
| February 13 | Maine | #1 | Kelley Rink • Chestnut Hill, MA | Katie Burt | W 6–0 | 28–1–1 (18–0–0) |
| February 14 | Maine | #1 | Kelley Rink • Chestnut Hill, MA | Gabri Switaj | W 4–1 | 29–1–1 (19–0–0) |
| February 19 | Boston University | #1 | Kelley Rink • Chestnut Hill, MA (6) | Katie Burt | W 5–0 | 30–1–1 (20–0–0) |
| February 19 | at #6 Boston University | #1 | Walter Brown Arena • Boston, MA | Katie Burt | T 2–2 ^{OT} | 30–1–2 (20–0–1) |
WHEA Tournament
| February 27 | Providence* | #1 | Kelley Rink • Chestnut Hill, MA (Quarterfinals, Game 1) | Katie Burt | W 6–2 | 31–1–2 |
| February 28 | Providence* | #1 | Kelley Rink • Chestnut Hill, MA (Quarterfinals, Game 2) | Katie Burt | W 8–0 | 32–1–2 |
| March 7 | vs. Connecticut* | #1 | Hyannis Youth and Community Center • Hyannis, MA (Semifinal Game) | Katie Burt | W 3–1 | 33–1–2 |
| March 8 | vs. #7 Boston University* | #1 | Hyannis Youth and Community Center • Hyannis, MA (WHEA Championship Game) | Katie Burt | L 1–4 | 33–2–2 |
NCAA Tournament
| March 14 | #7 Clarkson* | #1 | Kelley Rink • Chestnut Hill, MA (Quarterfinal Game) | Katie Burt | W 5–1 | 34–2–2 |
| March 20 | vs. #4 Harvard* | #1 | Ridder Arena • Minneapolis, MN (NCAA Semifinal, Frozen Four) | Katie Burt | L 1-2 | 34–3–2 |
*Non-conference game. ^{#}Rankings from USCHO.com Poll.

== Awards and honors ==
- Regular Season Hockey East Champions
- Alex Carpenter, Cammy Granato Player of the Year (Hockey East)
- Katie King-Crowley, Coach of the Year
- Katie Burt, Goaltending Champion
- Emily Pfalzer, Best Defenseman
- Katie Burt, Megan Keller, Tori Sullivan, Pro-Ambitions All-Rookie Team
- Katie Burt, Hockey East Rookie of the Month (December 2014)
- Katie Burt, Hockey East Defensive Player of the Month (December 2014)
- Katie Burt, Hockey East Defensive Player of the Week (Week of December 15, 2014)
- Katie Burt, Hockey East Defensive Player of the Month (January 2015)
- Alex Carpenter, 2015 Patty Kazmaier Award
- Alex Carpenter, Hockey East Player of the Month (October 2014)
- Alex Carpenter, Hockey East Player of the Month (November 2014)
- Alex Carpenter, Hockey East Player of the Week (Week of December 15, 2014)
- Kenzie Kent, Hockey East Rookie of the Month (November 2014)
- Kenzie Kent, Runner-Up, Hockey East Rookie of the Month (October 2014)

=== Hockey East All-Stars ===
- Alex Carpenter, 2014-15 Hockey East First Team All-Star
- Megan Keller, 2014-15 Hockey East First Team All-Star
- Emily Pfalzer, 2014-15 Hockey East First Team All-Star

== Miscellaneous ==
- The 2014-15 BC Eagles were only the second Hockey East women's team to be undefeated in regular season play (University of New Hampshire 2007-08).
- They are also tied with the 07-08 UNH team for season wins (20) and winning percentage (.976) in league play.
- They completed the longest Hockey East Women's winning streak, started in the prior season on 21 February 2015 (25 games).
- They set the all-time Hockey East Women's record for single season goals, with 114.
- Alex Carpenter became the third-highest Hockey East single season points leader with 41 points. She was already the highest single season points leader from the 2012-13 season (48 points).
- In her freshman year, Katie Burt broke the Hockey East Women's Goaltenders' records for Goals Against Average (0.61 goals per game) and Save Percentage (.965).
