= 2014–15 Cornell Big Red women's ice hockey season =

- Conference: 4th ECAC Hockey
- Home ice: Lynah Rink

Rankings
- USA Today/USA Hockey Magazine: 9th
- USCHO.com: 9th

Record
- Overall: 19-11-3
- Home: 9-4-3
- Road: 10-6-1
- Neutral: 0-1-0

Coaches and captains
- Head coach: Doug Derraugh
- Assistant coaches: Danielle Bilodeau; Edith Racine
- Captain: Brianne Jenner

The Cornell Big Red represented Cornell University in ECAC women's ice hockey during the 2014–15 NCAA Division I women's ice hockey season. The Big Red advanced to the ECAC Championship game but were stopped by Harvard.

== Offseason ==
One former and six current Cornell players were invited to try out for Team Canada in Fall Festival Tryouts.

=== Recruiting ===
Player	Position	Nationality	Notes
Erin O’Connor	Defense	United States	Member of Chicago Young Americans
Sydnee Saracco	Forward	United States	Competed with Chicago Mission
Morgan McKim	Forward	United States	Attended Shattuck St. Mary’s
Sarah Knee	Defense	Canada	Tallest member of Big Red at 6-1
Amelia Boughn	Goaltender	Canada	Former member of Mississauga Jr. Chiefs

== 2014–15 Big Red ==
No.	Nat.	Player	Class	Pos	Height	DoB	Hometown	Previous team
2		Erin O'Connor	Freshman	D	5' 10" (1.78 m)		Evanston, Illinois	Chicago Young Americans
3		Sydnee Saracco	Freshman	D	5' 3" (1.6 m)		Countryside, Illinois	Chicago Mission
5		Cassandra Poudrier	Junior	D	5' 5" (1.65 m)		Mont-Laurier, Quebec	Team Canada U18
9		Hannah Bunton	Sophomore	F	5' 9" (1.75 m)		Belleville, Ontario	Team Canada U18
10		Brianna Veerman	Sophomore	F	5' 5" (1.65 m)		Burlington, Ontario	Aurora Jr. Panthers
11		Brianne Jenner	Senior	F	5' 9" (1.75 m)		Oakville, Ontario	Canadian National Team
12		Morgan McKim	Freshman	F	5' 4" (1.63 m)		Mars, Pennsylvania	Shattuck-St. Mary's
13		Caroline DeBruin	Sophomore	F	5' 3" (1.6 m)		Burlington, Ontario	Aurora Jr. Panthers
17		Emily Fulton	Senior	F	5' 3" (1.6 m)		Stratford, Ontario	Team Canada U18
18		Jess Brown	Junior	F	5' 3" (1.6 m)		Cleveland, Ohio	Pittsburgh Jr. Penguins
19		Jillian Saulnier	Senior	F	5' 6" (1.68 m)		Halifax, Nova Scotia	Team Canada U22
20		Anna Zorn	Junior	F	5' 11" (1.8 m)		Churchville, New York	Rochester EDGE
21		Morgan Richardson	Junior	D	5' 4" (1.63 m)		Ottawa, Ontario	Team Canada U18
23		Sydney Smith	Sophomore	D	5' 3" (1.6 m)		Lethbridge, Alberta	Team Canada U18
24		Sarah Knee	Freshman	D	6' 1" (1.85 m)		Toronto, Ontario	Toronto Jr. Aeros
25		Taylor Woods	Junior	F	5' 2" (1.57 m)		Morden, Manitoba	Team Canada U18
26		Kaitlin Doering	Sophomore	F	5' 8" (1.73 m)		Waterloo, Ontario	Mississauga Jr. Chiefs
29		Amelia Broughn	Freshman	G	5' 7" (1.7 m)		Toronto, Ontario	Mississauga Jr. Chiefs
30		Paula Voorheis	Sophomore	G	6' 0" (1.83 m)		Shanty Bay, Ontario	Aurora Jr. Panthers
35		Stefannie Moak	Junior	G	5' 7" (1.7 m)		Middle Sackville, Nova Scotia	Metro Boston Pizza Midget AAA

== Schedule ==
Date	Opponent^{#}	Rank^{#}	Site	Decision	Result	Record
Regular Season
October 24	at #3 Boston College*	#5	Kelley Rink • Chestnut Hill, MA	Paula Voorheis	L 2–6	0–1–0
October 25	at #3 Boston College*	#5	Kelley Rink • Chestnut Hill, MA	Paula Voorheis	L 2–6	0–2–0
October 31	Princeton	#8	Lynah Rink • Ithaca, NY	Paula Voorheis	L 4–5	0–3–0 (0–1–0)
November 1	#5 Quinnipiac	#8	Lynah Rink • Ithaca, NY	Paula Voorheis	L 0–3	0–4–0 (0–2–0)
November 14	Brown		Lynah Rink • Ithaca, NY	Paula Voorheis	W 5–1	1–4–0 (1–2–0)
November 15	Yale		Lynah Rink • Ithaca, NY	Paula Voorheis	W 6–2	2–4–0 (2–2–0)
November 18	Colgate		Lynah Rink • Ithaca, NY	Paula Voorheis	W 3–1	3–4–0 (3–2–0)
November 21	at #10 Minnesota Duluth*		Amsoil Arena • Duluth, MN	Paula Voorheis	L 2–7	3–5–0
November 22	at #10 Minnesota Duluth*		Amsoil Arena • Duluth, MN	Paula Voorheis	L 0–2	3–6–0
December 1	#7 Mercyhurst*		Lynah Rink • Ithaca, NY	Paula Voorheis	T 1–1 ^{OT}	3–6–1
December 2	Syracuse*		Lynah Rink • Ithaca, NY	Amelia Boughn	W 6–2	4–6–1
December 5	at Clarkson		Cheel Arena • Potsdam, NY	Paula Voorheis	W 8–3	5–6–1 (4–2–0)
December 6	at St. Lawrence		Appleton Arena • Canton, NY	Paula Voorheis	W 4–2	6–6–1 (5–2–0)
January 9, 2015	St. Lawrence	#10	Lynah Rink • Ithaca, NY	Paula Voorheis	T 3–3 ^{OT}	6–6–2 (5–2–1)
January 10	Clarkson	#10	Lynah Rink • Ithaca, NY	Paula Voorheis	T 1–1 ^{OT}	6–6–3 (5–2–2)
January 13	#6 Boston University*		Lynah Rink • Ithaca, NY	Paula Voorheis	W 6–2	7–6–3
January 16	at Yale		Ingalls Rink • New Haven, CT	Paula Voorheis	W 2–0	8–6–3 (6–2–2)
January 17	at Brown		Meehan Auditorium • Providence, RI	Amelia Boughn	W 4–2	9–6–3 (7–2–2)
January 23	at Dartmouth	#10	Thompson Arena • Hanover, NH	Paula Voorheis	W 2–1	10–6–3 (8–2–2)
January 24	at #5 Harvard	#10	Bright-Landry Hockey Center • Allston, MA	Paula Voorheis	L 0–3	10–7–3 (8–3–2)
January 30	Union	#10	Lynah Rink • Ithaca, NY	Paula Voorheis	W 8–2	11–7–3 (9–3–2)
January 31	Rensselaer	#10	Lynah Rink • Ithaca, NY	Paula Voorheis	W 7–1	12–7–3 (10–3–2)
February 3	at Colgate	#9	Starr Rink • Hamilton, NY	Paula Voorheis	W 3–2 ^{OT}	13–7–3 (11–3–2)
February 6	at #5 Quinnipiac	#9	TD Bank Sports Center • Hamden, CT	Paula Voorheis	W 4–3 ^{OT}	14–7–3 (12–3–2)
February 7	at Princeton	#9	Hobey Baker Memorial Rink • Princeton, NJ	Paula Voorheis	L 2–3	14–8–3 (12–4–2)
February 13	#4 Harvard	#10	Lynah Rink • Ithaca, NY	Paula Voorheis	L 1–4	14–9–3 (12–5–2)
February 14	Dartmouth	#10	Lynah Rink • Ithaca, NY	Paula Voorheis	L 2–3	14–10–3 (12–6–2)
February 20	at Rensselaer		Houston Field House • Troy, NY	Paula Voorheis	W 4–1	15–10–3 (13–6–2)
February 21	at Union		Achilles Center • Schenectady, NY	Paula Voorheis	W 4–0	16–10–3 (14–6–2)
ECAC Tournament
February 27	#10 St. Lawrence*		Lynah Rink • Ithaca, NY (Quarterfinals, Game 1)	Paula Voorheis	W 3–1	17–10–3
February 28	#10 St. Lawrence*		Lynah Rink • Ithaca, NY (Quarterfinals, Game 2)	Paula Voorheis	W 3–2	18–10–3
March 7	at #5 Clarkson*	#9	Cheel Arena • Potsdam, NY (Semifinal Game)	Paula Voorheis	W 3–1	19–10–3
March 8	vs. #4 Harvard*	#9	Cheel Arena • Potsdam, NY (ECAC Championship Game)	Paula Voorheis	L 3–7	19–11–3
*Non-conference game. ^{#}Rankings from USCHO.com Poll.

== Awards and honors ==
- Brianne Jenner (48 points) and Emily Fulton (47 points) are #8 and #9 of top national points leaders
- Brianne Jenner, ECAC Player of the Year
- Brianne Jenner, Patty Kazmaier Award Finalist
- Brianne Jenner, F, All-ECAC First Team
- Jillian Saulnier, F, All-ECAC First Team
- Erin O'Connor, D, All-ECAC Second Team
- Emily Fulton, F, All-ECAC Second Team
- Erin O'Connor, D, All-ECAC Rookie Team
