= 2014–15 Quinnipiac Bobcats women's ice hockey season =

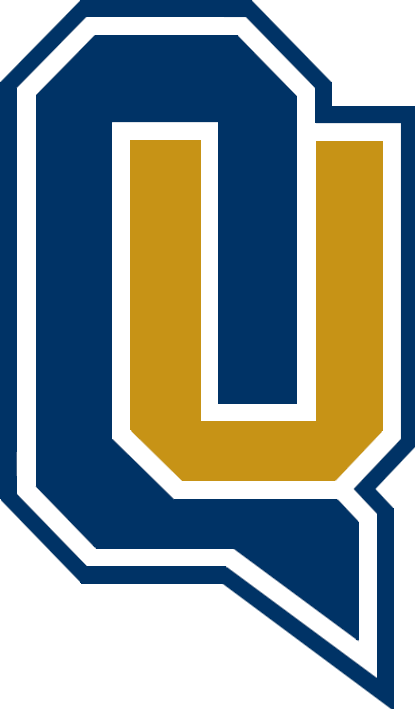

2014 Nutmeg Classic, 3-1 over Clarkson First Appearance in NCAA Tournament, Lost in Quarterfinal Round to Harvard, 0-5
- Conference: 3rd ECAC
- Home ice: TD Bank Sports Center, Hamden, CT

Rankings
- USCHO.com: 6th
- USA Today/USA Hockey Magazine: 6th

Record
- Overall: 26-9-3
- Home: 13-2-1
- Road: 11-6-2
- Neutral: 3-1-0

Coaches and captains
- Head coach: Cassandra Turner
- Assistant coaches: Amanda Mazzotta; Eddie Ardito
- Captain: Morgan Fritz-Ward
- Alternate captain(s): Shiann Darkangelo; Cyndey Roesler

The 2014–15 Quinnipiac Bobcats women's ice hockey season was the 14th season of play for the Quinnipiac Bobcats program. They represented Quinnipiac University during the 2014-15 NCAA Division I women's ice hockey season and played their home games at TD Bank Sports Center. Their 26 wins were the fifth most in the nation, and they remained nationally ranked throughout the season. Their success earned them a berth in the NCAA Tournament, but they were defeated by their ECAC rivals, Harvard, in the first round.

== Offseason ==
- The Bobcats travelled to Itay and Switzerland for ten days in August for exhibition games against European teams.

=== Recruiting ===
Player	Position	Nationality	Notes
Alicia Barry	Defense	United States	Played for Assabet Valley
Shannon Cherpak	Defense	United States	Attended Westminster School
Taylar Cianfarano	Forward	United States	Member of Team USA U18
Tori DeAngelis	Forward	United States	Invitee to Team USA Development Camp
Rachel Myette	Goaltender	United States	Led Duxbury HS to Massachusetts State Championship
Raquel Pennoyer	Forward	United States	Attended Tabor Academy

== 2014–15 Bobcats ==
No.	Nat.	Player	Class	Pos	Height	DoB	Hometown	Previous team
3		Olivia Agostinelli	Junior	F	5' 7" (1.7 m)		Framingham, Massachusetts	Winchendon School
6		Meghan Turner	Sophomore	F	5' 6" (1.68 m)		Bedford, New Hampshire	Assabet Valley
7		Nicole Kosta	Junior	F	5' 5" (1.65 m)		Mississauga, Ontario	Team Canada U18
8		Tori DeAngelis	Freshman	F	5' 8" (1.73 m)		Saunderstown, Rhode Island	Assabet Valley
9		Alicia Barry	Freshman	D	5' 9" (1.75 m)		Hanson, Massachusetts	Assabet Valley
10		Taryn Baumgardt	Sophomore	D	5' 7" (1.7 m)		Innisfail, Alberta	Team Canada U18
11		Morgan Fritz-Ward (C)	Senior	F	5' 7" (1.7 m)		Mason City, Iowa	Lakeville South
12		Danielle Marmer	Sophomore	F	5' 6" (1.68 m)		Dorset, Vermont	Connecticut Polar Bears
13		Erica Udén Johansson	Senior	F	5' 7" (1.7 m)		Sundsvall, Sweden	Swedish National Team
15		Kristen Tamberg	Junior	D	5' 7" (1.7 m)		Toronto, Ontario	Mississauga Jr. Chiefs
16		Lindsey West	Junior	D	5' 8" (1.73 m)		Ajax, Ontario	Whitby Jr. Wolves
17		Nicole Brown	Junior	F	5' 7" (1.7 m)		Oshawa, Ontario	Whitby Jr. Wolves
18		Emma Woods	Sophomore	F	5' 7" (1.7 m)		Burford, Ontario	Team Ontario Red
19		Shannon Cherpak	Freshman	D	5' 7" (1.7 m)		Enfield, Connecticut	Team Pittsburgh U19
20		Anna Borgfeldt	Senior	F	5' 5" (1.65 m)		Kristianstad, Sweden	Swedish National Team U18
21		Cydney Roesler (A)	Junior	D	5' 9" (1.75 m)		Stittsville, Ontario	Team Canada U18
22		Shiann Darkangelo (A)	Senior	F	5' 9" (1.75 m)		Brighton, Michigan	Team USA U18
23		Raquel Pennoyer	Freshman	F	5' 4" (1.63 m)		Rehoboth, Massachusetts	Massachusetts Spitfires
24		Nicole Connery	Junior	F	5' 6" (1.68 m)		Newmarket, Ontario	Team Canada U18
25		Emma Greco	Sophomore	D	5' 9" (1.75 m)		Burlington, Ontario	Team Ontario Red
26		Mika Nervick	Sophomore	F	5' 4" (1.63 m)		Lakeville, Minnesota	Shattuck-St. Mary's
28		Taylar Cianfarano	Freshman	F	5' 5" (1.65 m)		Oswego, New York	Team USA U18
30		Rachel Myette	Freshman	G	5' 9" (1.75 m)		Duxbury, Massachusetts	Bay State Breakers
34		Sydney Rossman	Sophomore	G	5' 5" (1.65 m)		Excelsior, Minnesota	Minnesota Jr. Whitecaps
78		Chelsea Laden	Senior	G	5' 8" (1.73 m)		Lakeville, Minnesota	Lakeville South

== Schedule ==
Date	Opponent^{#}	Rank^{#}	Site	Decision	Result	Record
Regular Season
October 3	Connecticut*	#10	TD Bank Sports Center • Hamden, CT	Chelsea Laden	W 3–0	1–0–0
October 11	at Penn State*	#8	Pegula Ice Arena • University Park, PA	Chelsea Laden	W 3–0	2–0–0
October 12	at Penn State*	#8	Pegula Ice Arena • University Park, PA	Sydney Rossman	T 1–1 ^{OT}	2–0–1
October 17	Maine*	#9	TD Bank Sports Center • Hamden, CT	Chelsea Laden	W 4–0	3–0–1
October 18	Maine*	#9	TD Bank Sports Center • Hamden, CT	Chelsea Laden	W 2–0	4–0–1
October 24	at New Hampshire*	#7	Whittemore Center • Durham, NH	Chelsea Laden	W 4–1	5–0–1
October 31	at Colgate	#5	Starr Rink • Hamilton, NY	Chelsea Laden	W 4–1	6–0–1 (1–0–0)
November 1	at #8 Cornell	#5	Lynah Rink • Ithaca, NY	Chelsea Laden	W 3–0	7–0–1 (2–0–0)
November 14	Rensselaer	#5	TD Bank Sports Center • Hamden, CT	Chelsea Laden	W 6–1	8–0–1 (3–0–0)
November 15	Union	#5	TD Bank Sports Center • Hamden, CT	Chelsea Laden	W 1–0	9–0–1 (4–0–0)
November 21	#5 Clarkson	#4	TD Bank Sports Center • Hamden, CT	Chelsea Laden	W 5–0	10–0–1 (5–0–0)
November 22	St. Lawrence	#4	TD Bank Sports Center • Hamden, CT	Chelsea Laden	T 2–2 ^{OT}	10–0–2 (5–0–1)
November 25	at Princeton	#4	Hobey Baker Memorial Rink • Princeton, NJ	Chelsea Laden	W 2–0	11–0–2 (6–0–1)
November 28	vs. Yale*	#4	Freitas Ice Forum • Storrs, CT (Nutmeg Classic, Opening Round)	Chelsea Laden	W 5–2	12–0–2
November 29	vs. #5 Clarkson*	#4	Freitas Ice Forum • Storrs, CT (Nutmeg Classic, Championship Game)	Chelsea Laden	W 3–1	13–0–2
December 5	at Dartmouth	#4	Thompson Arena • Hanover, NH	Chelsea Laden	T 4–4 ^{OT}	13–0–3 (6–0–2)
December 6	at #10 Harvard	#4	Bright-Landry Hockey Center • Allston, MA	Chelsea Laden	L 1–2	13–1–3 (6–1–2)
January 2, 2015	at Union	#5	Achilles Center • Schenectady, NY	Chelsea Laden	W 4–0	14–1–3 (7–1–2)
January 3	at Rensselaer	#5	Houston Field House • Troy, NY	Chelsea Laden	W 1–0	15–1–3 (8–1–2)
January 6	Princeton	#5	TD Bank Sports Center • Hamden, CT	Chelsea Laden	W 3–1	16–1–3 (9–1–2)
January 9	Brown	#5	TD Bank Sports Center • Hamden, CT	Chelsea Laden	W 3–0	17–1–3 (10–1–2)
January 10	Yale	#5	TD Bank Sports Center • Hamden, CT	Chelsea Laden	W 4–1	18–1–3 (11–1–2)
January 16	at Robert Morris*	#4	RMU Island Sports Center • Neville Township, PA	Chelsea Laden	W 3–2 ^{OT}	19–1–3
January 17	at Robert Morris*	#4	RMU Island Sports Center • Neville Township, PA	Chelsea Laden	W 3–0	20–1–3
January 21	at #7 Boston University*	#3	Walter Brown Arena • Boston, MA	Chelsea Laden	L 1–4	20–2–3
January 24	at #1 Boston College*	#3	Kelley Rink • Chestnut Hill, MA	Chelsea Laden	L 1–2	20–3–3
January 30	#4 Harvard	#5	TD Bank Sports Center • Hamden, CT	Chelsea Laden	L 1–2	20–4–3 (11–2–2)
January 31	Dartmouth	#5	TD Bank Sports Center • Hamden, CT	Chelsea Laden	W 3–1	21–4–3 (12–2–2)
February 6	Cornell	#5	TD Bank Sports Center • Hamden, CT	Chelsea Laden	L 3–4 ^{OT}	21–5–3 (12–3–2)
February 7	Colgate	#5	TD Bank Sports Center • Hamden, CT	Chelsea Laden	W 2–0	22–5–3 (13–3–2)
February 13	at St. Lawrence	#5	Appleton Arena • Canton, NY	Chelsea Laden	L 0–3	22–6–3 (13–4–2)
February 14	at #8 Clarkson	#5	Cheel Arena • Potsdam, NY	Sydney Rossman	W 1–0	23–6–3 (14–4–2)
February 20	at Yale	#5	Ingalls Rink • New Haven, CT	Chelsea Laden	L 0–3	23–7–3 (14–5–2)
February 21	at Brown	#5	Meehan Auditorium • Providence, RI	Chelsea Laden	W 1–0	24–7–3 (15–5–2)
ECAC Tournament
February 27	Princeton*	#6	TD Bank Sports Center • Hamden, CT (Quarterfinals, Game 1)	Chelsea Laden	W 7–0	25–7–3
February 28	Princeton*	#6	TD Bank Sports Center • Hamden, CT (Quarterfinals, Game 2)	Chelsea Laden	W 2–0	26–7–3
March 7	vs. #4 Harvard*	#6	Cheel Arena • Potsdam, NY (Semifinal Game)	Chelsea Laden	L 1–2 ^{OT}	26–8–3
NCAA Tournament
March 14	at #4 Harvard*	#6	Bright-Landry Hockey Center • Allston, MA (Quarterfinal Game)	Chelsea Laden	L 0–5	26–9–3
*Non-conference game. ^{#}Rankings from USCHO.com Poll.

== Awards and honors ==
- ECAC Team Sportsmanship Award
- Chelsea Laden, Mandi Schwartz ECAC Student Athlete of the Year
- Chelsea Laden, G, All-ECAC Second Team
- Nicole Kosta, F, All-ECAC Third Team
- Taylar Cianfarano, F, All ECAC Rookie Team
- Chelsea Laden was fourth nationally in Goals Against Average (1.19)
