= 2014–15 Colgate Raiders women's ice hockey season =

- Conference: 10th ECAC
- Home ice: Starr Rink

Record
- Overall: 7–25–2
- Home: 4–11–1
- Road: 3–14–1

Coaches and captains
- Head coach: Greg Fargo
- Assistant coaches: Karell Emard; Josh Sciba
- Captain(s): Miriam Drubel; Melissa Kueber; Katelyn Parker

The Colgate Raiders represented Colgate University in ECAC women's ice hockey during the 2014–15 NCAA Division I women's ice hockey season.

== Offseason ==
- Sept. 22: Lauren Wildfang was selected for the Team Canada Fall Festival in Calgary.

=== Recruiting ===
Player	Position	Nationality	Notes
Shelby Perry	Forward	Canada	Member of Team Ontario Blue
Ellie DeCaprio	Forward	United States	Competed with the East Coast Wizards
Kaila Pinkney	Defense	Canada	Member of Team Ontario Red
Megan Sullivan	Forward	Canada	Member of Team Ontario Blue
Lauren Wildfang	Defense	Canada	Former member of Team Canada
Breanne Wilson-Bennett	Forward	Canada	Former member of Team Canada
Annika Zalewski	Forward	United States	Played with the Buffalo Bison

== Roster ==
No.	Nat.	Player	Class	Pos	Height	DoB	Hometown	Previous team
1		Susan Allen	Senior	G	5' 7" (1.7 m)		Rochester, New York	Rochester Edge U19
4		Kaila Pinkney	Freshman	D	5' 9" (1.75 m)		Denfield, Ontario	Team Canada U18
5		Taylor Craig	Senior	F	5' 9" (1.75 m)		Mattapoisett, Massachusetts	Tabor Academy
6		Shelby Perry	Freshman	F	5' 8" (1.73 m)		Elginburg, Ontario	Kingston Ice Wolves
7		Megan Sullivan	Freshman	F	5' 4" (1.63 m)		Toronto, Ontario	Whitby Jr. Wolves
8		Miriam Drubel (C)	Senior	F	5' 5" (1.65 m)		Hanover, New Hampshire	North American Hockey Academy
9		Katie Case	Senior	D	5' 10" (1.78 m)		Grosse Pointe Shores, Michigan	Bluewater Hawks
10		Ellie DeCaprio	Freshman	F	5' 4" (1.63 m)		Wellesley, Massachusetts	Rivers School
11		Breanne Wilson-Bennett	Freshman	F	5' 4" (1.63 m)		Markham, Ontario	Team Canada U18
15		Annika Zalewski	Freshman	F	5' 10" (1.78 m)		New Hartford, New York	Buffalo Bisons
16		Katelyn Parker (C)	Junior	F	5' 5" (1.65 m)		Bellingham, Washington	Gilmour Academy
17		Kayla Haus	Sophomore	F	5' 7" (1.7 m)		Kasilof, Alaska	North American Hockey Academy
18		Nicole Gass	Junior	D	5' 8" (1.73 m)		Cookshire-Eaton, Quebec	John Abbott
19		Melissa Kueber (C)	Senior	F	5' 8" (1.73 m)		St. Albert, Alberta	Team Alberta
21		Lauren Wildfang	Freshman	D	5' 4" (1.63 m)		Waterdown, Ontario	Tean Canada U18
25		Hannah Rastrick	Sophomore	D	5' 8" (1.73 m)		Toronto, Ontario	Toronto Jr. Aeros
26		Cat Querion	Sophomore	D	5' 1" (1.55 m)		Lac-Megantic, Quebec	Stanstead College
27		Meghan Brennan	Sophomore	F	5' 9" (1.75 m)		Ottawa, Ontario	Nepean Jr. Wildcats
29		Brittney Brooks	Senior	G	5' 4" (1.63 m)		Las Vegas, Nevada	Colorado Selects
35		Ashlynne Rando	Junior	G	5' 9" (1.75 m)		Sugarland, Texas	North American Hockey Academy

== Schedule ==
Date	Opponent^{#}	Rank^{#}	Site	Decision	Result	Record
Regular Season
October 2	at Syracuse*		Tennity Ice Skating Pavilion • Syracuse, NY	Ashlynne Rando	L 1–2	0–1–0
October 10	at Robert Morris*		RMU Island Sports Center • Neville Township, PA	Ashlynne Rando	W 6–3	1–1–0
October 11	at Robert Morris*		RMU Island Sports Center • Neville Township, PA	Brittney Brooks	L 1–2	1–2–0
October 18	Connecticut*		Starr Rink • Hamilton, NY	Ashlynne Rando	L 1–2	1–3–0
October 19	Providence*		Starr Rink • Hamilton, NY	Ashlynne Rando	W 2–1	2–3–0
October 31	#5 Quinnipiac		Starr Rink • Hamilton, NY	Ashlynne Rando	L 1–4	2–4–0 (0–1–0)
November 1	Princeton		Starr Rink • Hamilton, NY	Ashlynne Rando	L 2–4	2–5–0 (0–2–0)
November 7	Penn State*		Starr Rink • Hamilton, NY	Ashlynne Rando	L 4–6	2–6–0
November 8	Penn State*		Starr Rink • Hamilton, NY	Brittney Brooks	L 1–3	2–7–0
November 14	Yale		Starr Rink • Hamilton, NY	Brittney Brooks	L 0–3	2–8–0 (0–3–0)
November 15	Brown		Starr Rink • Hamilton, NY	Brittney Brooks	W 4–3 ^{OT}	3–8–0 (1–3–0)
November 18	at Cornell		Lynah Rink • Ithaca, NY	Ashlynne Rando	L 1–3	3–9–0 (1–4–0)
November 25	at #8 Mercyhurst*		Mercyhurst Ice Center • Erie, PA	Brittney Brooks	L 0–3	3–10–0
November 26	at #8 Mercyhurst*		Mercyhurst Ice Center • Erie, PA	Ashlynne Rando	L 0–1	3–11–0
December 5	at St. Lawrence		Appleton Arena • Canton, NY	Ashlynne Rando	L 0–5	3–12–0 (1–5–0)
December 6	at Clarkson		Cheel Arena • Potsdam, NY	Brittney Brooks	L 1–5	3–13–0 (1–6–0)
January 2, 2015	at Vermont*		Gutterson Fieldhouse • Burlington, VT	Ashlynne Rando	L 2–3	3–14–0
January 3	at Vermont*		Gutterson Fieldhouse • Burlington, VT	Ashlynne Rando	L 1–2	3–15–0
January 6	Syracuse*		Starr Rink • Hamilton, NY	Ashlynne Rando	W 2–0	4–15–0
January 9	Clarkson		Starr Rink • Hamilton, NY	Ashlynne Rando	L 1–3	4–16–0 (1–7–0)
January 10	St. Lawrence		Starr Rink • Hamilton, NY	Ashlynne Rando	L 1–3	4–17–0 (1–8–0)
January 16	at Brown		Meehan Auditorium • Providence, RI	Ashlynne Rando	W 3–0	5–17–0 (2–8–0)
January 17	at Yale		Ingalls Rink • New Haven, CT	Ashlynne Rando	L 1–5	5–18–0 (2–9–0)
January 23	at #5 Harvard		Bright-Landry Hockey Center • Allston, MA	Ashlynne Rando	L 0–4	5–19–0 (2–10–0)
January 24	at Dartmouth		Thompson Arena • Hanover, NH	Ashlynne Rando	W 2–0	6–19–0 (3–10–0)
January 30	Rensselaer		Starr Rink • Hamilton, NY	Ashlynne Rando	W 4–2	7–19–0 (4–10–0)
January 31	Union		Starr Rink • Hamilton, NY	Ashlynne Rando	T 2–2 ^{OT}	7–19–1 (4–10–1)
February 3	#9 Cornell		Starr Rink • Hamilton, NY	Ashlynne Rando	L 2–3 ^{OT}	7–20–1 (4–11–1)
February 6	at Princeton		Hobey Baker Memorial Rink • Princeton, NJ	Ashlynne Rando	L 1–4	7–21–1 (4–12–1)
February 7	at #5 Quinnipiac		TD Bank Sports Center • Hamden, CT	Ashlynne Rando	L 0–2	7–22–1 (4–13–1)
February 13	Dartmouth		Starr Rink • Hamilton, NY	Ashlynne Rando	L 2–5	7–23–1 (4–14–1)
February 14	#4 Harvard		Starr Rink • Hamilton, NY	Susan Allen	L 0–5	7–24–1 (4–15–1)
February 20	at Union		Achilles Center • Schenectady, NY	Ashlynne Rando	T 2–2 ^{OT}	7–24–2 (4–15–2)
February 21	at Rensselaer		Houston Field House • Troy, NY	Brittney Brooks	L 3–5	7–25–2 (4–16–2)
*Non-conference game. ^{#}Rankings from USCHO.com Poll.
