= 2014–15 St. Lawrence Saints women's ice hockey season =

- Conference: 5th ECAC Hockey
- Home ice: Appleton Arena

Record
- Overall: 19-12-5
- Home: 13-4-1
- Road: 6-7-4
- Neutral: 0-1-0

Coaches and captains
- Head coach: Chris Wells
- Assistant coaches: Ted Wisner
- Captain: Amanda Boulier
- Alternate captain(s): Jessica Hon; Kayla Raniwsky; Ellie Williams

The St. Lawrence Saints represented St. Lawrence University in ECAC women's ice hockey during the 2014–15 NCAA Division I women's ice hockey season. The Saints continued a tradition of good, competitive hockey.

== Offseason ==
The Saints had 16 players honored as members of the ECAC All-Academic Team

=== Recruiting ===
Player	Position	Nationality	Notes
Michelle Alonardo	Forward	United States	Star at Governor's Academy
Kennedy Marchment	Forward	Canada	All-Star with Team Ontario Blue
Amanda McClure	Defense	Canada	Played for Cambridge Jr. Rivulettes
Hannah Miller	Forward	Canada	From Okanagan Hockey Academy
Sophia Millerick	Defense	United States	Attended St. Mark's School (MA)
Brooke Wolejko	Goaltender	United States	Tended Net for Assabet Valley

== 2014–15 Saints ==
No.	Nat.	Player	Class	Pos	Height	DoB	Hometown	Previous team
1		Brooke Wolejko	Freshman	G	5' 8" (1.73 m)		South Windsor, Connecticut	Assabet Valley
2		Sophia Millerick	Freshman	D	4' 11" (1.5 m)		Waltham, Massachusetts	St. Mark's School
4		Jenna Marks	Junior	D	5' 4" (1.63 m)		Madison, Wisconsin	Shattuck-St. Mary's
5		Kirsten Padalis	Sophomore	D	5' 7" (1.7 m)		Farmington, Michigan	Honeybaked
6		Michelle Alonardo	Freshman	F	5' 6" (1.68 m)		Wilmington, Massachusetts	Governor's Academy
7		Alex Moore	Sophomore	F	5' 11" (1.8 m)		Napanee, Ontario	Team Ontario
8		Amanda Boulier (C)	Senior	D	5' 11" (1.8 m)		Watertown, Connecticut	Westminster School
9		Abbey McRae	Junior	F	5' 7" (1.7 m)		London, Ontario	London Jr. Devilettes
10		Hannah Miller	Freshman	F	5' 9" (1.75 m)		North Vancouver, British Columbia	Okanagan Hockey Academy
11		Jessica Hon (A)	Senior	F	5' 3" (1.6 m)		Fullerton, California	North American Hockey Academy
12		Dominique Korakianitis	Junior	D	5' 5" (1.65 m)		London, Ontario	Bluewater Jr. Hawks
14		Sydney Bell	Junior	F	5' 7" (1.7 m)		Cincinnati, Ohio	Pittsburgh Jr. Penguins
16		Kennedy Marchment	Freshman	F	5' 8" (1.73 m)		Courtice, Ontario	Team Ontario Blue
17		Kayla Raniwski (A)	Senior	F	5' 5" (1.65 m)		Windsor, Ontario	Niagara University
18		Megan Armstrong	Junior	D	5' 7" (1.7 m)		Edina, Minnesota	New Hampshire
20		Jacqueline Wand	Senior	F	5' 6" (1.68 m)		Cary, Illinois	Chicago Mission
21		Amanda McClure	Freshman	D	5' 7" (1.7 m)		Stratford, Ontario	Cambridge Jr. Rivulettes
22		Kailee Heidersbach	Junior	F	5' 5" (1.65 m)		Park Ridge, Illinois	Chicago Mission
24		Ellie Williams (A)	Senior	F	5' 4" (1.63 m)		Pryor, Oklahoma	Shattuck-St. Mary's
25		Victoria Leimgardt	Junior	D	5' 10" (1.78 m)		Stayner, Ontario	Mississauga Jr. Chiefs
26		Brooke Webster	Sophomore	F	5' 5" (1.65 m)		Aurora, Ontario	Team Ontario
28		Giulia Mazzocchi	Junior	G	5' 4" (1.63 m)		Marlengo, Italy	EV Bozen Eagles
30		Carmen MacDonald	Senior	G	5' 7" (1.7 m)		Pictou, Nova Scotia	Westminster School
33		Mikaela Thompson	Junior	G	5' 3" (1.6 m)		Webster, New York	Rochester Edge

== Schedule ==
Date	Opponent^{#}	Rank^{#}	Site	Decision	Result	Record
Regular Season
October 3	#7 Clarkson*		Appleton Arena • Canton, NY	Carmen MacDonald	W 5–3	1–0–0
October 4	at #7 Clarkson*		Cheel Arena • Potsdam, NY	Carmen MacDonald	L 1–2	1–1–0
October 10	#3 Boston College*		Appleton Arena • Canton, NY	Carmen MacDonald	L 1–2	1–2–0
October 11	#3 Boston College*		Appleton Arena • Canton, NY	Carmen MacDonald	T 2–2 ^{OT}	1–2–1
October 17	Robert Morris*		Appleton Arena • Canton, NY	Carmen MacDonald	W 8–2	2–2–1
October 18	Robert Morris*		Appleton Arena • Canton, NY	Brooke Wolejko	W 3–1	3–2–1
October 28	at #9 Clarkson		Cheel Arena • Potsdam, NY	Carmen MacDonald	L 0–5	3–3–1 (0–1–0)
October 31	at Yale		Ingalls Rink • New Haven, CT	Carmen MacDonald	W 3–0	4–3–1 (1–1–0)
November 1	at Brown		Meehan Auditorium • Providence, RI	Brooke Wolejko	L 4–7	4–4–1 (1–2–0)
November 8	vs. Dartmouth*		Bill Gray's Regional Iceplex • Brighton, NY (Fire and Ice Youth Hockey Tournament)	Mikaela Thompson	L 1–5	4–5–1
November 14	#10 Dartmouth		Appleton Arena • Canton, NY	Carmen MacDonald	W 2–1	5–5–1 (2–2–0)
November 15	#4 Harvard		Appleton Arena • Canton, NY	Carmen MacDonald	W 5–4 ^{OT}	6–5–1 (3–2–0)
November 21	at Princeton		Hobey Baker Memorial Rink • Princeton, NJ	Carmen MacDonald	W 7–3	7–5–1 (4–2–0)
November 22	at Quinnipiac		TD Bank Sports Center • Hamden, CT	Carmen MacDonald	T 2–2 ^{OT}	7–5–2 (4–2–1)
December 5	Colgate		Appleton Arena • Canton, NY	Carmen MacDonald	W 5–0	8–5–2 (5–2–1)
December 6	Cornell		Appleton Arena • Canton, NY	Carmen MacDonald	L 2–4	8–6–2 (5–3–1)
January 3, 2015	at Minnesota State*		All Seasons Arena • Mankato, MN	Brooke Wolejko	W 3–1	9–6–2
January 4	at #2 Minnesota*		Ridder Arena • Minneapolis, MN	Brooke Wolejko	L 0–10	9–7–2
January 6	at #2 Minnesota*		Ridder Arena • Minneapolis, MN	Brooke Wolejko	L 1–5	9–8–2
January 9	at #10 Cornell		Lynah Rink • Ithaca, NY	Brooke Wolejko	T 3–3 ^{OT}	9–8–3 (5–3–2)
January 10	at Colgate		Starr Rink • Hamilton, NY	Brooke Wolejko	W 3–1	10–8–3 (6–3–2)
January 16	Rensselaer		Appleton Arena • Canton, NY	Brooke Wolejko	W 3–1	11–8–3 (7–3–2)
January 17	Union		Appleton Arena • Canton, NY	Brooke Wolejko	W 4–2	12–8–3 (8–3–2)
January 23	#9 Mercyhurst*		Appleton Arena • Canton, NY	Carmen MacDonald	W 6–1	13–8–3
January 24	#9 Mercyhurst*		Appleton Arena • Canton, NY	Carmen MacDonald	W 4–1	14–8–3
January 30	Brown	#9	Appleton Arena • Canton, NY	Carmen MacDonald	W 4–0	15–8–3 (9–3–2)
January 31	Yale	#9	Appleton Arena • Canton, NY	Carmen MacDonald	W 4–3	16–8–3 (10–3–2)
February 3	#10 Clarkson	#8	Appleton Arena • Canton, NY	Carmen MacDonald	L 1–3	16–9–3 (10–4–2)
February 6	at Union	#8	Achilles Center • Schenectady, NY	Carmen MacDonald	T 1–1 ^{OT}	16–9–4 (10–4–3)
February 7	at Rensselaer	#8	Houston Field House • Troy, NY	Carmen MacDonald	W 2–1	17–9–4 (11–4–3)
February 13	#5 Quinnipiac		Appleton Arena • Canton, NY	Carmen MacDonald	W 3–0	18–9–4 (12–4–3)
February 14	Princeton		Appleton Arena • Canton, NY	Carmen MacDonald	L 2–4	18–10–4 (12–5–3)
February 20	at #3 Harvard	#10	Bright-Landry Hockey Center • Allston, MA	Carmen MacDonald	T 1–1 ^{OT}	18–10–5 (12–5–4)
February 21	at Dartmouth	#10	Thompson Arena • Hanover, NH	Carmen MacDonald	W 6–4	19–10–5 (13–5–4)
ECAC Tournament
February 27	at Cornell*	#10	Lynah Rink • Ithaca, NY (Quarterfinals, Game 1)	Carmen MacDonald	L 1–3	19–11–5
February 28	at Cornell*	#10	Lynah Rink • Ithaca, NY (Quarterfinals, Game 2)	Carmen MacDonald	L 2–3	19–12–5
*Non-conference game. ^{#}Rankings from USCHO.com Poll.

== Awards and honors ==
- Amanda Boulier, D, All-ECAC Third Team
- Brooke Webster, F, All-ECAC Third Team
- Kennedy Marchment, F, All-ECAC Rookie Team
