= 2014–15 RPI Engineers women's ice hockey season =

American college hockey season

2014–15 Rensselaer Engineers women's ice hockey season
- Conference: 9th ECAC Hockey
- Home ice: Houston Field House

Record
- Overall: 7–23–4
- Home: 6–11–2
- Road: 1–12–2

Coaches and captains
- Head coach: John Burke
- Assistant coaches: Melanie Green; Derek Alfama
- Captain(s): Ali Svoboda; Taylor Mahoney
- Alternate captain: Mari Mankey

The Rensselaer Engineers represented Rensselaer Polytechnic Institute in ECAC women's ice hockey during the 2014–15 NCAA Division I women's ice hockey season. The Engineers did not qualify for the ECAC tournament.

== Offseason ==
- August 23:Heidi Huhtamaki was invited to participate in Team Finland Camp to qualify for Team Finland in the 2015 World Championships.

=== Recruiting ===
Player	Position	Nationality	Notes
Amanda Kimmerle	Defense	United States	Attended Anoka (MN) High School
Marisa Raspa	Forward	United States	played for the North American Hockey Academy
Whitney Renn	Forward	United States	Played with Little Caesars Detroit
Shayna Tomlinson	Forward	United States	Played with Assabet Valley

== 2014–15 Engineers ==
No.	Nat.	Player	Class	Pos	Height	DoB	Hometown	Previous team
1		Sarah Till	Junior	G	5' 10" (1.78 m)		Jericho, Vermont	Rice Academy
2		Heidi Niskanen	Sophomore	D	5' 9" (1.75 m)		Espoo, Finland	Espoo Blues
3		Kathryn Schilter	Senior	D	5' 7" (1.7 m)		Aurora, Ontario	Toronto Jr. Aeros
4		Ali Svoboda (C)	Senior	F	5' 8" (1.73 m)		Arlington Heights, Illinois	Chicago Mission
7		Delaney Middlebrook	Senior	D	5' 6" (1.68 m)		Minneapolis, Minnesota	Niagara University
8		Taylor Mahoney (C)	Senior	F	5' 6" (1.68 m)		Cary, Illinois	Chicago Mission
10		Lauren Wash	Junior	F	5' 4" (1.63 m)		Belle Meade, New Jersey	New Jersey Rockets
11		Alexa Gruschow	Junior	F	5' 6" (1.68 m)		Mechanicsburg, Pennsylvania	Washington Pride
12		Jenn Godin	Junior	F	5' 5" (1.65 m)		New London, New Hampshire	Tabor Academy
13		Mariana Walsh	Senior	F	5' 8" (1.73 m)		Walpole, Massachusetts	Assabet Valley
14		Shayna Tomlinson	Freshman	F	5' 6" (1.68 m)		Gilford, New Hampshire	Assabet Valley
15		Laura Horwood	Sophomore	F	5' 6" (1.68 m)		Belleville, Ontario	Durham West Lightning
16		Mari Mankey (A)	Junior	F	5' 2" (1.57 m)		Hopkins, Minnesota	Hopkins HS
17		Hannah Behounek	Sophomore	D	5' 7" (1.7 m)		Minnetonka, Minnesota	Minnetonka HS
19		Marisa Raspa	Freshman	F	5' 3" (1.6 m)		Downingtown, Pennsylvania	North American Hockey Academy
20		Amanda Kimmerle	Freshman	D	5' 9" (1.75 m)		Anoka, Minnesota	Anoka HS
21		Katie Rooney	Sophomore	F	5' 7" (1.7 m)		Buffalo, Minnesota	Buffalo HS
24		Brandi Banks	Junior	D	5' 6" (1.68 m)		Burlington, Ontario	Stoney Creek Sabres
25		Whitney Renn	Freshman	F	5' 6" (1.68 m)		Troy, Michigan	Detroit Little Caesars
26		Lindsey Hylwa	Sophomore	F	5' 8" (1.73 m)		Cary, North Carolina	Gilmore Academy
30		Brianna Piper	Senior	G	5' 8" (1.73 m)		Oakville, Ontario	Toronto Jr. Aeros
31		Kelly O'Brien	Senior	G	5' 9" (1.75 m)		Sussex, Wisconsin	Madison Capitols

== Schedule ==
Date	Opponent^{#}	Rank^{#}	Site	Decision	Result	Record
Regular Season
October 3	at #8 North Dakota*		Ralph Engelstad Arena • Grand Forks, ND	Kelly O'Brien	L 1–7	0–1–0
October 4	at Bemidji State*		Sanford Center • Bemidji, MN	Brianna Piper	L 0–4	0–2–0
October 11	Vermont*		Houston Field House • Troy, NY	Kelly O'Brien	L 2–4	0–3–0
October 12	at Vermont*		Gutterson Fieldhouse • Burlington, VT	Brianna Piper	T 2–2 ^{OT}	0–3–1
October 17	at New Hampshire*		Whittemore Center • Durham, NH	Brianna Piper	L 1–2	0–4–1
October 25	Connecticut*		Houston Field House • Troy, NY	Kelly O'Brien	W 4–1	1–4–1
October 26	Connecticut*		Houston Field House • Troy, NY	Brianna Piper	T 2–2 ^{OT}	1–4–2
October 31	at #4 Harvard		Bright-Landry Hockey Center • Allston, MA	Brianna Piper	L 1–4	1–5–2 (0–1–0)
November 1	at Dartmouth		Thompson Arena • Hanover, NH	Kelly O'Brien	L 2–5	1–6–2 (0–2–0)
November 7	St. Cloud State*		Houston Field House • Troy, NY	Brianna Piper	L 2–3	1–7–2
November 8	St. Cloud State*		Houston Field House • Troy, NY	Kelly O'Brien	L 0–3	1–8–2
November 14	at #5 Quinnipiac		TD Bank Sports Center • Hamden, CT	Brianna Piper	L 1–6	1–9–2 (0–3–0)
November 15	at Princeton		Hobey Baker Memorial Rink • Princeton, NJ	Kelly O'Brien	L 1–2 ^{OT}	1–10–2 (0–4–0)
November 28	RIT*		Houston Field House • Troy, NY	Kelly O'Brien	W 4–1	2–10–2
November 29	RIT*		Houston Field House • Troy, NY	Kelly O'Brien	L 0–3	2–11–2
December 5	Brown		Houston Field House • Troy, NY	Brianna Piper	W 7–5	3–11–2 (1–4–0)
December 6	Yale		Houston Field House • Troy, NY	Kelly O'Brien	L 2–3	3–12–2 (1–5–0)
January 2, 2015	Princeton		Houston Field House • Troy, NY	Kelly O'Brien	W 4–3	4–12–2 (2–5–0)
January 3	#5 Quinnipiac		Houston Field House • Troy, NY	Kelly O'Brien	L 0–1	4–13–2 (2–6–0)
January 6	Providence*		Houston Field House • Troy, NY	Brianna Piper	T 3–3 ^{OT}	4–13–3
January 9	Dartmouth		Houston Field House • Troy, NY	Kelly O'Brien	L 0–3	4–14–3 (2–7–0)
January 10	#6 Harvard		Houston Field House • Troy, NY	Kelly O'Brien	L 1–4	4–15–3 (2–8–0)
January 16	at St. Lawrence		Appleton Arena • Canton, NY	Kelly O'Brien	L 1–3	4–16–3 (2–9–0)
January 17	at #8 Clarkson		Cheel Arena • Potsdam, NY	Kelly O'Brien	L 2–4	4–17–3 (2–10–0)
January 23	at Union		Achilles Center • Schenectady, NY	Kelly O'Brien	T 2–2 ^{OT}	4–17–4 (2–10–1)
January 24	Union		Houston Field House • Troy, NY	Kelly O'Brien	W 4–2	5–17–4 (3–10–1)
January 30	at Colgate		Starr Rink • Hamilton, NY	Kelly O'Brien	L 2–4	5–18–4 (3–11–1)
January 31	at #10 Cornell		Lynah Rink • Ithaca, NY	Kelly O'Brien	L 1–7	5–19–4 (3–12–1)
February 6	#10 Clarkson		Houston Field House • Troy, NY	Kelly O'Brien	L 1–2	5–20–4 (3–13–1)
February 7	#8 St. Lawrence		Houston Field House • Troy, NY	Kelly O'Brien	L 1–2	5–21–4 (3–14–1)
February 13	at Yale		Ingalls Rink • New Haven, CT	Kelly O'Brien	L 0–5	5–22–4 (3–15–1)
February 14	at Brown		Meehan Auditorium • Providence, RI	Kelly O'Brien	W 3–2	6–22–4 (4–15–1)
February 20	Cornell		Houston Field House • Troy, NY	Brianna Piper	L 1–4	6–23–4 (4–16–1)
February 21	Colgate		Houston Field House • Troy, NY	Kelly O'Brien	W 5–3	7–23–4 (5–16–1)
*Non-conference game. ^{#}Rankings from USCHO.com Poll.
