= 2014–15 Princeton Tigers women's ice hockey season =

- Conference: 6th ECAC Hockey
- Home ice: Hobey Baker Memorial Rink

Record
- Overall: 15-14-2
- Home: 8-5-2
- Road: 7-9-0
- Neutral: 0-0-0

Coaches and captains
- Head coach: Jeff Kampersal
- Assistant coaches: Lee-J Mirasolo; Cara Morey
- Captain(s): Brianna Leahy; Ali Pankowski

The Princeton Tigers represented Princeton University in ECAC women's ice hockey during the 2014–15 NCAA Division I women's ice hockey season. The Tigers were stopped by nationally ranked Quinnipiac in the ECAC quarterfinals.

== Offseason ==
- September 22: Goaltender Kimberly Newell and Assistant Coach Cara Morey were invited by Team Canada to participate in the Fall Festival in Calgary, Alberta.

=== Recruiting ===
Player	Position	Nationality	Notes
Alev Baysoy	Forward	United States	Attended St. Paul Academy
Hannah Sorkin	Defense	United States	Played with East Coast Wizards
Kiersten Falck	Forward	United States	Played for Minnesota Jr. Whitecaps
Emily Achterkirch	Defense	United States	Played for Minnesota Jr. Whitecaps
Alysia Dasilva	Goaltender	Canada	Former member of Mississauga Jr. Chiefs

== 2014–15 Tigers ==
No.	Nat.	Player	Class	Pos	Height	DoB	Hometown	Previous team
2		Molly Strabley	Sophomore	D	5' 5" (1.65 m)		Yarmouth, Maine	Assabet Valley
3		Ali Pankowski (C)	Senior	D	5' 10" (1.78 m)		Laguna Hills, California	North American Hockey Academy
4		Alev Baysoy		F	5' 8" (1.73 m)		St. Paul, Minnesota	St. Paul Academy
6		Maddie Peake	Junior	F	5' 9" (1.75 m)		Shoreview, Minnesota	Mounds View HS
7		Jaime McDonell	Junior	F	5' 8" (1.73 m)		East York, Ontario	Toronto Jr. Aeros
8		Audrey Potts	Sophomore	F	5' 6" (1.68 m)		Toronto, Ontario	Toronto Jr. Aeros
9		Molly Contini	Sophomore	F	5' 8" (1.73 m)		Arthur, Ontario	Kitchener-Waterloo Rangers
10		Cassidy Tucker	Sophomore	F	5' 8" (1.73 m)		Plymouth, Michigan	Detroit Little Caesars
11		Kelsey Koelzer	Sophomore	D	5' 9" (1.75 m)		Horsham, Pennsylvania	New Jersey Rockets
12		Morgan Sly	Sophomore	F	5' 6" (1.68 m)		Collingwood, Ontario	Toronto Jr. Aeros
15		Brianna Leahy (C)	Senior	F	5' 8" (1.73 m)		Waterloo, Ontario	Burlington Jr. Baracudas
16		Karen MacDonald	Junior	D	5' 8" (1.73 m)		Ottawa, Ontario	Ottawa Jr. Senators
17		Brianne Mahoney	Senior	D	5' 7" (1.7 m)		Clarendon Hills, Illinois	Chicago Mission
18		Hillary Lloyd	Sophomore	F	5' 3" (1.6 m)		Toronto, Ontario	Mississauga Jr. Chiefs
19		Cristin Shanahan	Junior	F	5' 8" (1.73 m)		Ottawa, Ontario	Ottawa Jr. Senators
20		Hannah Sorkin	Freshman	D	5' 4" (1.63 m)		Melville, New York	East Coast Wizards
22		Kiersten Falck	Freshman	F	5' 5" (1.65 m)		Ham Lake, Minnesota	Minnesota Jr. Whitecaps
23		Emily Achterkirch	Freshman	D	5' 7" (1.7 m)		St. Michael, Minnesota	Minnesota Jr. Whitecaps
24		Fiona McKenna	Sophomore	F	5' 8" (1.73 m)		Burr Ridge, Illinois	Team USA U18
30		Ashley Holt	Senior	G	5' 6" (1.68 m)		Weston, Connecticut	Choate-St. Mary's
31		Alysia Dasilva	Freshman	G	5' 7" (1.7 m)		Oakville, Ontario	Mississauga Jr. Chiefs
33		Kimberly Newell	Junior	G	5' 9" (1.75 m)		Vancouver, British Columbia	Team Canada U18

== Schedule ==
Date	Opponent^{#}	Rank^{#}	Site	Decision	Result	Record
Regular Season
October 26	at Penn State*		Pegula Ice Arena • University Park, PA	Kimberly Newell	L 1–2	0–1–0
October 27	at Penn State*		Pegula Ice Arena • University Park, PA	Kimberly Newell	W 4–1	1–1–0
October 31	at #8 Cornell		Lynah Rink • Ithaca, NY	Kimberly Newell	W 5–4	2–1–0 (1–0–0)
November 1	at Colgate		Starr Rink • Hamilton, NY	Kimberly Newell	W 4–2	3–1–0 (2–0–0)
November 7	RIT*		Hobey Baker Memorial Rink • Princeton, NJ	Alysia DaSilva	W 4–3 ^{OT}	4–1–0
November 8	RIT*		Hobey Baker Memorial Rink • Princeton, NJ	Kimberly Newell	T 0–0 ^{OT}	4–1–1
November 14	Union		Hobey Baker Memorial Rink • Princeton, NJ	Kimberly Newell	W 3–2 ^{OT}	5–1–1 (3–0–0)
November 15	Rensselaer		Hobey Baker Memorial Rink • Princeton, NJ	Kimberly Newell	W 2–1 ^{OT}	6–1–1 (4–0–0)
November 21	St. Lawrence		Hobey Baker Memorial Rink • Princeton, NJ	Kimberly Newell	L 3–7	6–2–1 (4–1–0)
November 22	#5 Clarkson		Hobey Baker Memorial Rink • Princeton, NJ	Kimberly Newell	L 2–3	6–3–1 (4–2–0)
November 25	#4 Quinnipiac		Hobey Baker Memorial Rink • Princeton, NJ	Kimberly Newell	L 0–2	6–4–1 (4–3–0)
November 29	#2 Minnesota*		Hobey Baker Memorial Rink • Princeton, NJ	Kimberly Newell	L 1–2	6–5–1
November 30	#2 Minnesota*		Hobey Baker Memorial Rink • Princeton, NJ	Kimberly Newell	L 2–5	6–6–1
December 5	at #10 Harvard		Bright-Landry Hockey Center • Allston, MA	Kimberly Newell	L 0–3	6–7–1 (4–4–0)
December 6	at Dartmouth		Thompson Arena • Hanover, NH	Kimberly Newell	W 5–2	7–7–1 (5–4–0)
January 2, 2015	at Rensselaer		Houston Field House • Troy, NY	Kimberly Newell	L 3–4	7–8–1 (5–5–0)
January 3	at Union		Achilles Center • Schenectady, NY	Alysia DaSilva	W 3–0	8–8–1 (6–5–0)
January 6	at #5 Quinnipiac		TD Bank Sports Center • Hamden, CT	Kimberly Newell	L 1–3	8–9–1 (6–6–0)
January 9	Yale		Hobey Baker Memorial Rink • Princeton, NJ	Kimberly Newell	W 4–1	9–9–1 (7–6–0)
January 10	Brown		Hobey Baker Memorial Rink • Princeton, NJ	Alysia DaSilva	W 5–1	10–9–1 (8–6–0)
January 26	at #1 Boston College*		Kelley Rink • Chestnut Hill, MA	Kimberly Newell	L 2–4	10–10–1
January 30	Dartmouth		Hobey Baker Memorial Rink • Princeton, NJ	Kimberly Newell	T 2–2 ^{OT}	10–10–2 (8–6–1)
January 31	#4 Harvard		Hobey Baker Memorial Rink • Princeton, NJ	Kimberly Newell	W 1–0	11–10–2 (9–6–1)
February 6	Colgate		Hobey Baker Memorial Rink • Princeton, NJ	Kimberly Newell	W 4–1	12–10–2 (10–6–1)
February 7	#9 Cornell		Hobey Baker Memorial Rink • Princeton, NJ	Kimberly Newell	W 3–2	13–10–2 (11–6–1)
February 13	at #8 Clarkson		Cheel Arena • Potsdam, NY	Kimberly Newell	L 1–2	13–11–2 (11–7–1)
February 14	at St. Lawrence		Appleton Arena • Canton, NY	Kimberly Newell	W 4–2	14–11–2 (12–7–1)
February 20	at Brown		Meehan Auditorium • Providence, RI	Kimberly Newell	W 4–1	15–11–2 (13–7–1)
February 21	at Yale		Ingalls Rink • New Haven, CT	Kimberly Newell	L 1–2	15–12–2 (13–8–1)
ECAC Tournament
February 27	at #6 Quinnipiac*		TD Bank Sports Center • Hamden, CT (Quarterfinals, Game 1)	Kimberly Newell	L 0–7	15–13–2
February 28	at #6 Quinnipiac*		TD Bank Sports Center • Hamden, CT (Quarterfinals, Game 2)	Kimberly Newell	L 0–2	15–14–2
*Non-conference game. ^{#}Rankings from USCHO.com Poll.

== Awards and honors ==
- Molly Contini, Forward, All-ECAC Second Team
- Kelsey Koelzer, Defense, All-ECAC Second Team
