= 2014–15 Harvard Crimson women's ice hockey season =

ECAC Hockey Tournament Champions ECAC Hockey Regular Season co-champions Beanpot Champions Frozen four defeated Boston College 2-1 NCAA Championship Game, L, 1–4 vs. Minnesota
- Conference: T–1st ECAC
- Home ice: Bright-Landry Hockey Center

Rankings
- USCHO.com: #2
- USA Today/USA Hockey Magazine: #2

Record
- Overall: 27–6–3
- Home: 15–1–1
- Road: 9–4–2
- Neutral: 3–1–0

Coaches and captains
- Head coach: Katey Stone
- Assistant coaches: Maura Crowell; Laura Bellamy; Mark Hanson
- Captain(s): Kalley Armstrong; Michelle Picard; Josephine Pucci

The Harvard Crimson represented Harvard University in ECAC women's ice hockey during the 2014–15 NCAA Division I women's ice hockey season. The Crimson played in the NCAA Division I National Championship, losing to Minnesota.

== Offseason ==
- August 8: Crimson players Miye D'Oench and Michelle Picard, plus freshman Lexie Laing earned invitations to the USA Hockey Women’s National Festival at Lake Placid, New York.

=== Recruiting ===
Player	Position	Nationality	Notes
Nikki Friesen	Forward	United States	Competed at Chatfield
Karly Heffernan	Forward	Canada	Earned gold medals at 2013 and 2014 IIHF World Women's U18 Championship
Dani Krzyszczyk	Forward	Canada	Played at St. Mary’s Academy
Lexie Laing	Forward	United States	Attended Noble and Greenough
Haley Mullins	Forward	United States	Attended Noble and Greenough
Chelsea Ziadie	Defense	Canada	Competed at the Hotchkiss School

== News and notes ==
- October 31: In her NCAA debut, Lexie Laing logged her first career goal for Harvard. Said goal was logged on the power play and would prove to be the game winning tally in a 4-1 triumph over RPI. Of note, the Crimson goaltender was Lexie's sister Brianna.

== Roster ==
No.	Nat.	Player	Class	Pos	Height	DoB	Hometown	Previous team
1		Brianna Laing	Sophomore	G	5' 6" (1.68 m)		Marblehead, Massachusetts	Noble and Greenough
2		Josephine Pucci (C)	Senior	D	5' 8" (1.73 m)		Pearl River, New York	Choate Rosemary Hall
3		Sarah Edney	Senior	D	5' 6" (1.68 m)		Mississauga, Ontario	Our Lady of Mount Carmel SS
6		Nikki Friesen	Freshman	F	5' 4" (1.63 m)		Corvallis, Oregon	Chatfield
7		Natasha Rachlin	Sophomore	D	5' 4" (1.63 m)		Brookline, Massachusetts	Noble and Greenough
8		Hillary Crowe	Senior	F	5' 11" (1.8 m)		Eden Prairie, Minnesota	Blake School
9		Lyndsey Fry	Senior	F	5' 8" (1.73 m)		Chandler, Arizona	Arizona Connections Academy
10		Dani Krzyszczyk	Freshman	F	5' 6" (1.68 m)		Winnipeg, Manitoba	Shattuck-St. Mary's
11		Robyn White	Sophomore	D	5' 9" (1.75 m)		Weston, Massachusetts	Noble and Greenough
12		Samantha Reber	Senior	F	5' 9" (1.75 m)		Edina, Minnesota	Edina HS
13		Kalley Armstrong (C)	Senior	F	5' 10" (1.78 m)		Maple, Ontario	Toronto Jr. Aeros
15		Mary Parker	Junior	F	5' 9" (1.75 m)		Milton, Massachusetts	Noble and Greenough
16		Marissa Gedman	Senior	D	5' 9" (1.75 m)		Framingham, Massachusetts	Noble and Greenough
17		Briana Mastel	Freshman	D	5' 8" (1.73 m)		Wallingford, Connecticut	Choate Rosemary Hall
19		Miye D'Oench	Junior	F	5' 4" (1.63 m)		New York, New York	St. Anne's School
20		Michelle Picard (C)	Junior	D	5' 6" (1.68 m)		Taunton, Massachusetts
21		Jessica Harvey	Junior	F	5' 9" (1.75 m)		Norfolk, New York	Norwood Norfolk Central
22		Lexie Laing	Freshman	F	5' 6" (1.68 m)		Marblehead, Massachusetts	Noble and Greenough
23		Dylanne Crugnale	Junior	F	5' 8" (1.73 m)		Laguna Niguel, California	North American Hockey Academy
24		Chelsea Ziadie	Freshman	D	5' 3" (1.6 m)		Pointe Claire, Quebec	Hotchkiss School
25		Sydney Daniels	Sophomore	F	5' 8" (1.73 m)		Southwick, Massachusetts	Westminster School
26		Haley Mullins	Freshman	F	5' 9" (1.75 m)		East Greenwich, Rhode Island	Noble and Greenough
27		Karley Heffernan	Freshman	F	5' 8" (1.73 m)		Sherwood Park, Alberta	Vimy Ridge Academy
28		Abbey Frazer	Sophomore	D	5' 7" (1.7 m)		Hudson, Quebec	John Abbot College
35		Molly Tissenbaum	Sophomore	G	5' 7" (1.7 m)		Toronto, Ontario	Premier Elite
38		Emerance Maschmeyer	Junior	G	5' 6" (1.68 m)		Bruderheim, Alberta	John Paul II HS

== Schedule ==
Date	Opponent^{#}	Rank^{#}	Site	Decision	Result	Record
Regular Season
October 31	Rensselaer	#4	Bright-Landry Hockey Center • Allston, MA	Brianna Laing	W 4–1	1–0–0 (1–0–0)
November 1	Union	#4	Bright-Landry Hockey Center • Allston, MA	Molly Tissenbaum	W 5–2	2–0–0 (2–0–0)
November 14	at #7 Clarkson	#4	Cheel Arena • Potsdam, NY	Emerance Maschmeyer	T 2–2 ^{OT}	2–0–1 (2–0–1)
November 15	at St. Lawrence	#4	Appleton Arena • Canton, NY	Emerance Maschmeyer	L 4–5 ^{OT}	2–1–1 (2–1–1)
November 21	at #7 Boston University*	#6	Walter Brown Arena • Boston, MA	Emerance Maschmeyer	T 1–1 ^{OT}	2–1–2
November 28	at #1 Boston College*	#7	Kelley Rink • Chestnut Hill, MA	Emerance Maschmeyer	L 2–10	2–2–2
November 29	at Northeastern*	#7	Matthews Arena • Boston, MA	Brianna Laing	W 4–3	3–2–2
December 2	Dartmouth	#10	Bright-Landry Hockey Center • Allston, MA	Emerance Maschmeyer	W 4–3	4–2–2 (3–1–1)
December 5	Princeton	#10	Bright-Landry Hockey Center • Allston, MA	Brianna Laing	W 3–0	5–2–2 (4–1–1)
December 6	#4 Quinnipiac	#10	Bright-Landry Hockey Center • Allston, MA	Emerance Maschmeyer	W 2–1	6–2–2 (5–1–1)
January 2, 2015	at Brown	#6	Meehan Auditorium • Providence, RI	Emerance Maschmeyer	W 6–0	7–2–2 (6–1–1)
January 3	at Yale	#6	Ingalls Rink • New Haven, CT	Emerance Maschmeyer	W 3–1	8–2–2 (7–1–1)
January 6	Connecticut*	#6	Bright-Landry Hockey Center • Allston, MA	Brianna Laing	W 8–2	9–2–2
January 9	at Union	#6	Achilles Center • Schenectady, NY	Brianna Laing	W 7–1	10–2–2 (8–1–1)
January 10	at Rensselaer	#6	Houston Field House • Troy, NY	Emerance Maschmeyer	W 4–1	11–2–2 (9–1–1)
January 14	at New Hampshire*	#5	Whittemore Center • Durham, NH	Emerance Maschmeyer	W 4–1	12–2–2
January 17	at Dartmouth	#5	Thompson Arena • Hanover, NH	Emerance Maschmeyer	L 2–4	12–3–2 (9–2–1)
January 23	Colgate	#5	Bright-Landry Hockey Center • Allston, MA	Brianna Laing	W 4–0	13–3–2 (10–2–1)
January 24	Cornell	#5	Bright-Landry Hockey Center • Allston, MA	Emerance Maschmeyer	W 3–0	14–3–2 (11–2–1)
January 30	at Quinnipiac	#4	TD Bank Sports Center • Hamden, CT	Emerance Maschmeyer	W 2–1 ^{OT}	15–3–2 (12–2–1)
January 31	at Princeton	#4	Hobey Baker Memorial Rink • Princeton, NJ	Brianna Laing	L 0–1	15–4–2 (12–3–1)
February 3	#6 Boston University*	#4	Bright-Landry Hockey Center • Allston, MA (Beanpot, Opening Game)	Emerance Maschmeyer	W 9–2	16–4–2
February 6	Yale	#4	Bright-Landry Hockey Center • Allston, MA	Brianna Laing	W 6–1	17–4–2 (13–3–1)
February 7	Brown	#4	Bright-Landry Hockey Center • Allston, MA	Brianna Laing	W 7–1	18–4–2 (14–3–1)
February 10	#1 Boston College*	#4	Bright-Landry Hockey Center • Allston, MA (Beanpot Championship)	Emerance Maschmeyer	W 3–2	19–4–2
February 13	at #10 Cornell	#4	Lynah Rink • Ithaca, NY	Emerance Maschmeyer	W 4–1	20–4–2 (15–3–1)
February 14	at Colgate	#4	Starr Rink • Hamilton, NY	Emerance Maschmeyer	W 5–0	21–4–2 (16–3–1)
February 20	#10 St. Lawrence	#3	Bright-Landry Hockey Center • Allston, MA	Emerance Maschmeyer	T 1–1 ^{OT}	21–4–3 (16–3–2)
February 21	#7 Clarkson	#3	Bright-Landry Hockey Center • Allston, MA	Emerance Maschmeyer	L 0–1	21–5–3 (16–4–2)
ECAC Tournament
February 27	Yale*	#4	Bright-Landry Hockey Center • Allston, MA (Quarterfinals, Game 1)	Emerance Maschmeyer	W 2–1	22–5–3
February 28	Yale*	#4	Bright-Landry Hockey Center • Allston, MA (Quarterfinals, Game 2)	Emerance Maschmeyer	W 3–0	23–5–3
March 7	vs. #6 Quinnipiac*	#4	Cheel Arena • Potsdam, NY (Semifinals)	Emerance Maschmeyer	W 2–1 ^{OT}	24–5–3
March 7	vs. #9 Cornell*	#4	Cheel Arena • Potsdam, NY (ECAC Championship)	Emerance Maschmeyer	W 7–1	25–5–3
NCAA Tournament
March 14	#6 Quinnipiac*	#4	Bright-Landry Hockey Center • Allston, MA (NCAA Quarterfinal)	Emerance Maschmeyer	W 5–0	26–5–3
March 20	vs. #1 Boston College*	#4	Ridder Arena • Minneapolis, MN (NCAA Semifinal)	Emerance Maschmeyer	W 2–1	27–5–3
March 22	at #2 Minnesota*	#4	Ridder Arena • Minneapolis, MN (NCAA Semifinal)	Emerance Maschmeyer	L 1–4	27–6–3
*Non-conference game. ^{#}Rankings from USCHO.com Poll.

== Awards and honors ==
- Emerance Maschmeyer, Patty Kazmaier Award nominee
- Sarah Edney, 2015 CCM Hockey Women's Division I All-Americans, Second Team
- Sarah Edney, ECAC Defenseman of the Year Award
- Sarah Edney, First Team All-ECAC
- Lexie Laing, ECAC All-Rookie Team honoree
- Lexie Laing, ECAC Rookie of the Year Finalist
- Mary Parker, Second Team All-ECAC
- Emerance Maschmeyer, Third Team All-ECAC
- Emerance Maschmeyer, ECAC Goaltender of the Year Finalist
- Emerance Maschmeyer, ECAC All-Tournament Team
- Mary Parker, All-Ivy League First Team
- Emerance Maschmeyer, All-Ivy League First Team
- Mary Parker, ECAC Forward of the Year Finalist
- Mary Parker, ECAC All-Tournament Team
