= 2014–15 NCAA Division I women's ice hockey season =

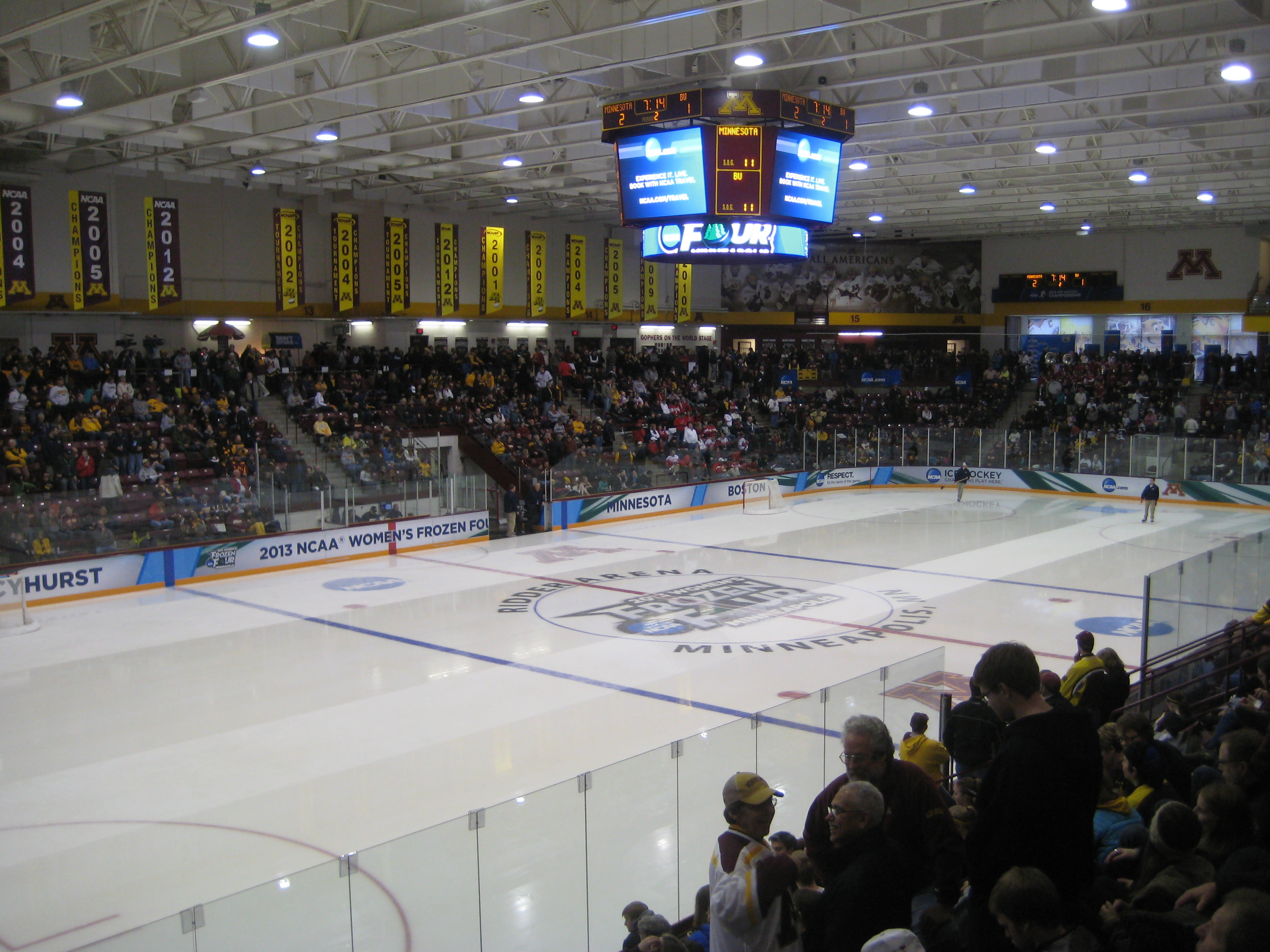
- University of Minnesota's Ridder Arena in Minneapolis was the site for the 2015 Frozen Four (Women)
- Duration: September 27, 2014– March 20, 2015
- NCAA tournament: 2015
- National championship: Ridder Arena; Minneapolis
- NCAA champion: Minnesota Golden Gophers
- Patty Kazmaier Award: Alex Carpenter (Boston College)

The 2014–15 NCAA Division I women's ice hockey season began in October 2014 and ended with the 2015 NCAA Division I women's ice hockey tournament's championship game in March 2015.

== Pre-season polls ==
The top 10 from USCHO.com, September 22, 2014, and the top 10 from USA Today/USA Hockey Magazine, First place votes are in parentheses.

USCHO.com
Ranking	Team
1	Minnesota (12)
2	Wisconsin
3	Boston College
4	Harvard (1)
5	Cornell
6	Boston University (1)
7	Clarkson (1)
8	North Dakota
9	Mercyhurst
10 (tie)	Minnesota Duluth
10 (tie)	Quinnipiac

USA Today/USA Hockey Magazine
Ranking	Team
1	Minnesota (14)
2	Wisconsin (4)
3	Boston College
4	Harvard
5	Boston University
6	Cornell
7	Clarkson
8	North Dakota
9	Mercyhurst
10	Quinnipiac

== Regular season ==
=== Standings ===
- 2014–15 College Hockey America standings
  	Conference record							Overall record					
  	GP	W	L	T	PTS	GF	GA	GP	W	L	T	GF	GA
  Mercyhurst^{†}	20	14	5	1	29	66	31	35	23	9	3	96	56
  Syracuse	20	8	6	6	22	45	39	36	11	15	10	75	97
  Penn State	20	9	9	2	20	42	46	37	17	16	4	72	88
  Robert Morris	20	8	8	4	20	45	43	35	11	19	5	68	91
  Lindenwood	20	7	11	2	16	40	59	33	10	21	2	57	102
  RIT*	20	5	12	3	13	32	52	39	15	19	5	71	87
  Championship: RIT † indicates conference regular season champion; * indicates conference tournament champion Final rankings: USCHO.com Poll
- 2014–15 NCAA Division I Independents standings
  	Overall record					
  	GP	W	L	T	GF	GA
  Sacred Heart	25	7	15	3	55	96
  Final rankings: USCHO.com Poll
- 2014–15 ECAC Hockey standings
  	Conference record							Overall record					
  	GP	W	L	T	PTS	GF	GA	GP	W	L	T	GF	GA
  #2 Harvard^{†}*	22	16	4	2	34	78	26	36	27	6	3	131	57
  #7 Clarkson^{†}	22	16	4	2	34	64	28	38	24	11	3	109	61
  #6 Quinnipiac	22	15	5	2	32	54	25	38	26	9	3	97	45
  #9 Cornell	22	14	6	2	30	77	46	33	19	11	3	108	83
  St. Lawrence	22	13	5	4	30	67	50	36	19	12	5	105	91
  Princeton	22	13	8	1	27	60	47	31	15	14	2	74	73
  Yale	22	12	10	0	24	61	53	31	15	15	1	93	78
  Dartmouth	22	9	11	2	20	55	59	30	13	15	2	81	85
  Rensselaer	22	5	16	1	11	42	76	34	7	23	4	63	111
  Colgate	22	4	16	2	10	33	72	34	7	25	2	54	100
  Union	22	1	16	5	7	29	83	34	4	22	8	42	108
  Brown	22	2	19	1	5	39	94	29	5	23	1	58	117
  Championship: Harvard † indicates conference regular season champion; * indicates conference tournament champion Final rankings: USCHO.com
- 2014–15 Hockey East standings
  	Conference record							Overall record					
  	GP	W	L	T	PTS	GF	GA	GP	W	L	T	GF	GA
  #3 Boston College^{†}	21	20	0	1	41	114	18	39	34	3	2	195	47
  #5 Boston University*	21	15	5	1	31	80	50	37	25	9	3	141	94
  Northeastern	21	11	8	2	24	67	63	36	14	17	5	95	104
  Maine	21	9	11	1	19	41	58	33	10	20	3	54	87
  Connecticut	21	5	11	5	15	50	72	37	11	18	8	80	112
  New Hampshire	21	6	13	2	14	40	68	36	10	23	3	62	111
  Vermont	21	6	14	1	13	46	73	36	15	19	2	86	118
  Providence	21	5	15	1	11	40	76	35	6	25	4	60	128
  Championship: Boston University † indicates conference regular season champion; * indicates conference tournament champion Final rankings: USCHO.com
- 2014–15 Western Collegiate Hockey Association standings
  	Conference record								Overall record					
  	GP	W	L	T	SOW	PTS	GF	GA	GP	W	L	T	GF	GA
  #1 Minnesota^{†}	28	22	2	4	2	72	116	36	41	34	3	4	184	48
  #4 Wisconsin*	28	19	6	3	1	61	89	36	40	29	7	4	138	45
  #8 North Dakota	28	16	9	3	2	53	67	43	37	22	12	3	97	59
  Minnesota Duluth	28	14	10	4	2	48	68	56	37	20	12	5	98	70
  #10 Bemidji State	28	13	14	1	1	41	58	57	39	21	17	1	86	70
  Ohio State	28	12	13	3	1	40	60	61	36	17	16	3	82	76
  St. Cloud State	28	5	22	1	1	17	28	98	37	8	28	1	45	127
  Minnesota State	28	1	26	1	0	4	30	129	36	3	32	1	42	160
  Championship: Wisconsin † indicates conference regular season champion; * indicates conference tournament champion Final rankings: USCHO.com

== Player stats ==
=== Scoring leaders ===
The following players lead the NCAA in points at the conclusion of games played on March 24, 2015.

Player	Class	Team	GP	G	A	Pts	PIM
Alex Carpenter	Junior	Boston College	37	37	44	81	13
Hannah Brandt	Junior	Minnesota	40	34	40	74	14
Haley Skarupa	Junior	Boston College	37	31	40	71	11
Dani Cameranesi	Sophomore	Minnesota	40	23	42	65	24
Marie-Philip Poulin	Senior	Boston University	32	27	27	54	18
Kendall Coyne	Junior	Northeastern	31	28	24	52	12
Sarah Lefort	Junior	Boston University	37	23	27	50	32
Brianne Jenner	Senior	Cornell	30	15	33	48	22
Emily Fulton	Senior	Cornell	32	19	28	47	17
Maryanne Menefee	Junior	Minnesota	39	23	24	47	0

=== Leading goaltenders ===
The following goaltenders lead the NCAA in goals against average at the conclusion of games played on March 24, 2015, while playing at least 33% of their team's total minutes.

Player	Class	Team	GP	Min	W	L	T	GA	SO	SV%	GAA
Katie Burt	Freshman	Boston College	35	2062:05	30	3	2	38	10	.941	1.11
Ann-Renée Desbiens	Sophomore	Wisconsin	37	2236:55	26	7	4	43	14	.941	1.15
Amanda Leveille	Junior	Minnesota	34	1984:18	28	3	3	39	6	.946	1.18
Chelsea Laden	Junior	Quinnipiac	36	2122:12	25	9	2	42	16	.930	1.19
Shelby Amsley-Benzie	Junior	North Dakota	28	1731:11	18	7	3	35	9	.952	1.21

== Awards ==
=== WCHA ===
Award		Recipient
Player of the Year		Hannah Brandt, Minnesota
Outstanding Student-Athlete of the Year		Shelby Amsley-Benzie, North Dakota
Defensive Player of the Year		Rachel Ramsey, Minnesota
Rookie of the Year		Annie Pankowski, Wisconsin
Scoring Champion		Hannah Brandt, Minnesota
Goaltending Champion		Ann-Renee Desbiens, Wisconsin
Coach of the Year		James Scanlan, Bemidji State
All-WCHA Teams
First Team	Position	Second Team
Shelby Amsley-Benzie, North Dakota	G	Brittni Mowat, Bemidji State tied – First team
Rachel Ramsey, Minnesota	D	Milica McMillen, Minnesota
Lee Stecklein, Minnesota	D	Brigette Lacquette, Minnesota Duluth
Hannah Brandt, Minnesota	F	Annie Pankowski, Wisconsin
Dani Cameranesi, Minnesota	F	Brittany Ammerman, Wisconsin
Blayre Turnbull, Wisconsin	F	Zoe Hickel, Minnesota Duluth
Third Team	Position	Rookie Team
Ann-Renee Desbiens, Wisconsin	G	Kassidy Suave, Ohio State
Courtney Burke, Wisconsin	D	Sydney Baldwin, Minnesota
Halli Krzyzaniak, North Dakota	D	Alexis Joyce, Bemidji State
Rachael Bona, Minnesota	F	Annie Pankowski, Wisconsin
Becca Kohler, North Dakota	F	Emily Clark, Wisconsin
Karley Sylvester, Wisconsin	F	Kelly Pannek, Minnesota

=== CHA ===
Award		Recipient
Player of the Year		Emily Janiga, Mercyhurst
Rookie of the Year		Stephanie Grossi, Syracuse
Goaltender of the Year		Amanda Makela, Mercyhurst
Defenseman of the Year		Molly Byrne, Mercyhurst
Defensive Forward of the Year		Lindsay Grigg, RIT
Sportsmanship Award		Taylor Thurston, RIT
Coach of the Year		Paul Flanagan, Syracuse
CHA All-Conference Teams
First Team	Position	Second Team
Nicole Hensley, Lindenwood	G	Jennifer Gilligan, Syracuse
Molly Byrne, Mercyhurst	D	Mikaela Lowater, Robert Morris
Nicole Renault, Syracuse	D	Akane Hosoyamada, Syracuse
Shara Jasper, Lindenwood	F	Rebecca Vint, Robert Morris
Emily Janiga, Mercyhurst	F	Laura Bowman, Penn State
Melissa Piacentini, Syracuse	F	Jennifer Dingeldein, Mercyhurst
Rookie Team	Position	–
Hannah Ehresmann, Penn State	G	
Christa Vuglar, RIT	D	
Bella Sutton, Penn State	D	
Sarah Robello, Mercyhurst	F	
Stephanie Grossi, Syracuse	F	
Alysha Burris, Syracuse	F	

=== Hockey East ===
Award		Recipient
Cami Granato Award (Player of the Year)		Alex Carpenter, Boston College
Best Defensive Forward		Marie-Philip Poulin, Boston University
Best Defensive Defenseman		Emily Pfalzer, Boston College
Goaltender of the Year		Katie Burt, Boston College
Sportmanship Award		Beth Hanrahan, Providence
Army ROTC Three Stars Award		Alex Carpenter, Boston College
Scoring Champion		Alex Carpenter, Boston College
Hockey East All-Star Teams
First Team	Position	Second Team
Meghann Treacy, Maine	G	Katie Burt, Boston College
Emily Pfalzer, Boston College	D	Lexi Bender, Boston College
Megan Keller, Boston College	D	Shannon Doyle, Boston University
Alex Carpenter, Boston College	F	Sarah Lefort, Boston University
Marie-Philip Poulin, Boston University	F	Haley Skarupa, Boston College
Kendall Coyne, Northeastern	F	Kayla Tutino, Boston University
Honorable Mention	Position	Rookie Team
Elaine Chuli, Connecticut	G	Katie Burt, Boston College
Heather Mottau, Northeastern	D	Megan Keller, Boston College
Kelsey MacSorely, Maine	D	Leah Lum, Connecticut
Dayna Colang, Vermont	F	Victoria Bach, Boston University
Jonna Curtis, New Hampshire	F	Denisa Křížová, Northeastern
Rebecca Leslie, Boston University
Tori Sullivan, Boston College

=== ECAC ===
Award		Recipient
Player of the Year		Brianne Jenner, Cornell
Best Defenseman		Sarah Edney, Harvard
Rookie of the Year		Shea Tiley, Clarkson
Goaltender of the Year		Shea Tiley, Clarkson
Sportmanship Award		Quinnipiac
Mandi Schwartz Student-Athlete of the Year		Chelsea Laden, Quinnipiac
Coach of the Year		Matt Desrosiers, Clarkson
All-ECAC Teams
First Team	Position	Second Team
Shea Tiley, Clarkson	G	Chelsea Laden, Quinnipiac
Sarah Edney, Harvard	D	Kelsey Koelzer, Princeton
Renata Fast, Clarkson	D	Erin O'Connor, Cornell
Brianne Jenner, Cornell	F	Emily Fulton, Cornell
Cayley Mercer, Clarkson	F	Mary Parker, Harvard
Jillian Saulnier, Cornell	F	Molly Contini, Princeton
Third Team	Position	Rookie Team
Emerance Maschmeyer, Harvard	G	Shea Tiley, Clarkson
Erin Ambrose, Clarkson	D	Erin O'Connor, Cornell
Amanda Boulier, St. Lawrence	D	Savannah Harmon, Clarkson
Shannon MacAuley, Clarkson	F	Taylar Cianfarano, Quinnipiac
Brooke Webster, St. Lawrence	F	Lexie Laing, Harvard
Nicole Kosta, Quinnipiac	F	Kennedy Marchment, St. Lawrence

=== Patty Kazmaier Award ===
Patty Kazmaier Award Finalists
Player	Position	School
Alex Carpenter	Forward	Boston College
Hannah Brandt	Forward	Minnesota
Marie-Philip Poulin	Forward	Boston University
Shelby Amsley-Benzie	Goaltender	North Dakota
Dani Cameranesi	Forward	Minnesota
Kendall Coyne	Forward	Northeastern
Brianne Jenner	Forward	Cornell
Emily Pfalzer	Defense	Boston College
Rachel Ramsey	Defense	Minnesota
Haley Skarupa	Forward	Boston College

=== AHCA Coach of the Year ===
AHCA Coach of the Year Finalists
Coach	School
Katie King-Crowley	Boston College
Matt Desrosiers	Clarkson
Paul Flanagan	Syracuse
Brad Frost	Minnesota
Mark Johnson	Wisconsin
James Scanlan	Bemidji State
Katey Stone	Harvard
