= 2014–15 Dartmouth Big Green women's ice hockey season =

- Conference: 8th ECAC Hockey
- Home ice: Thompson Arena

Record
- Overall: 13-15-2
- Home: 5-8-1
- Road: 7-7-1
- Neutral: 1-0-0

Coaches and captains
- Head coach: Mark Hudak
- Assistant coaches: Holly Tyng; Josh Liegl
- Captain: Karlee Odland
- Alternate captain(s): Morgan Illikainen; Catherine Berghuis

The Dartmouth Big Green represented Dartmouth College in ECAC women's ice hockey during the 2014–15 NCAA Division I women's ice hockey season. The Big Green were defeated by powerhouse Clarkson in the ECAC quarterfinals.

== Offseason ==
- August 18: Junior forward Laura Stacey was selected to Team Canada U22 development team.

=== Recruiting ===
Player	Position	Nationality	Notes Source:
Brooke Ahbe	Forward	United States	Attended Shattuck-St. Mary's
Elena Horton	Forward	United States	played for Team Pittsburg
Hailey Noronha	Defense	Canada	Played with the Whitby Jr. Wolves
Casey Nunnelly	Goaltender	United States	Former goalie with Noble and Greenough
Morgan Turner	Forward	United States	Played for Chicago Mission

== 2014–15 Big Green ==
No.	Nat.	Player	Class	Pos	Height	DoB	Hometown	Previous team
2		Elena Horton	Freshman	F	5' 9" (1.75 m)		Cincinnati, Ohio	Team Pittsburgh
4		Zoe Brennan	Junior	D	5' 8" (1.73 m)		Calgary, Alberta	Edge School
7		Laura Stacey	Freshman	F	5' 11" (1.8 m)		Kleinburg, Ontario	Team Canada U22
9		Eleni Tebano	Sophomore	D	5' 6" (1.68 m)		Glastonbury, Connecticut	Westminster School
7		Abby Gahm	Sophomore	F/D	5' 4" (1.63 m)		Eagle River, Alaska	Brewster Academy
10		Morgan Turner	Freshman	F	5' 8" (1.73 m)		Chicago, Illinois	Chicago Mission
11		Morgan Illikainen (A)	Senior	D	5' 8" (1.73 m)		Grand Rapids, Minnesota	Minnesota Jr. Whitecaps
12		MacKenzie St. Onge	Sophomore	F	5' 7" (1.7 m)		Stowe, Vermont	North American Hockey Academy
13		Catherine Berghuis (A)	Junior	F	5' 8" (1.73 m)		Truro, Nova Scotia	Mississauga Jr. Chiefs
14		Lindsey Allen	Junior	F	5' 10" (1.78 m)		Toronto, Ontario	Toronto Jr. Aeros
16		Hailey Noronha	Freshman	D	5' 5" (1.65 m)		Newmarket, Ontario	Whitby Jr. Wolves
17		Samantha Zeiss	Senior	F	5' 6" (1.68 m)		Stamford, Connecticut	Connecticut Polar Bears U19
18		Kennedy Ottenbreit	Sophomore	F	5' 8" (1.73 m)		Grayson, Saskatchewan	Shattuck-St. Mary's
19		Devon Moir	Sophomore	F	5' 5" (1.65 m)		Toronto, Ontario	Toronto Jr. Aeros
20		Olivia Whitford	Junior	D	5' 7" (1.7 m)		Milton, Ontario	Burlington Jr. Barracudas
21		Brooke Ahbe	Freshman	F	5' 8" (1.73 m)		Centennial, Colorado	Shattuck-St. Mary's
22		Karlee Odland (C)	Senior	F	5' 7" (1.7 m)		Vauxhall, Alberta	Medicine Hat Hounds Midget
23		Katy Ratty	Sophomore	F	5' 2" (1.57 m)		Northfield, Illinois	Chicago Mission
24		Emma Korbs	Sophomore	D	5' 6" (1.68 m)		Toronto, Ontario	Malvern HS
27		Ailish Forfar	Junior	F	5' 6" (1.68 m)		Sharon, Ontario	Toronto Jr. Aeros
29		Gianna Guarino	Senior	G	5' 8" (1.73 m)		Winthrop, Massachusetts	Winsor School
30		Robyn Chemago	Sophomore	G	5' 6" (1.68 m)		Slave Lake, Alberta	Roland Michner Secondary School

== 2014–15 schedule ==
Date	Opponent^{#}	Rank^{#}	Site	Decision	Result	Record
Regular Season
October 26	New Hampshire*		Thompson Arena • Hanover, NH	Robyn Chemago	W 6–2	1–0–0
October 31	Union		Thompson Arena • Hanover, NH	Robyn Chemago	W 3–0	2–0–0 (1–0–0)
November 1	Rensselaer		Thompson Arena • Hanover, NH	Robyn Chemago	W 5–2	3–0–0 (2–0–0)
November 8	vs. St. Lawrence		Bill Gray's Regional Iceplex • Brighton, NY (Fire and Ice Youth Hockey Tournament)	Robyn Chemago	W 5–1	4–0–0 (3–0–0)
November 14	at St. Lawrence	#10	Appleton Arena • Canton, NY	Robyn Chemago	L 1–2	4–1–0 (3–1–0)
November 15	at #7 Clarkson	#10	Cheel Arena • Potsdam, NY	Robyn Chemago	L 0–3	4–2–0 (3–2–0)
November 29	#6 Boston University*		Thompson Arena • Hanover, NH	Robyn Chemago	L 2–4	4–3–0
December 2	at #10 Harvard		Bright-Landry Hockey Center • Allston, MA	Robyn Chemago	L 1–4	4–4–0 (2–3–0)
December 5	#4 Quinnipiac		Thompson Arena • Hanover, NH	Robyn Chemago	T 4–4 ^{OT}	4–4–1 (2–3–1)
December 6	Princeton		Thompson Arena • Hanover, NH	Robyn Chemago	L 2–5	4–5–1 (2–4–1)
December 10	#1 Boston College*		Thompson Arena • Hanover, NH	Robyn Chemago	L 1–6	4–6–1 (2–5–1)
December 14	at Vermont*		Gutterson Fieldhouse • Burlington, VT	Robyn Chemago	W 6–2	5–6–1
December 31	at Northeastern*		Matthews Arena • Boston, MA	Robyn Chemago	W 5–1	6–6–1
January 2, 2015	at Yale		Ingalls Rink • New Haven, CT	Robyn Chemago	L 1–5	6–7–1 (2–5–1)
January 3	at Brown		Meehan Auditorium • Providence, RI	Robyn Chemago	W 5–1	7–7–1 (3–5–1)
January 9	at Rensselaer		Houston Field House • Troy, NY	Robyn Chemago	W 3–0	8–7–1 (4–5–1)
January 10	at Union		Achilles Center • Schenectady, NY	Robyn Chemago	W 3–1	9–7–1 (5–5–1)
January 17	#5 Harvard		Thompson Arena • Hanover, NH	Robyn Chemago	W 4–2	10–7–1 (6–5–1)
January 23	#10 Cornell		Thompson Arena • Hanover, NH	Robyn Chemago	L 1–2	10–8–1 (6–6–1)
January 24	Colgate		Thompson Arena • Hanover, NH	Robyn Chemago	L 0–2	10–9–1 (6–7–1)
January 30	at Princeton		Hobey Baker Memorial Rink • Princeton, NJ	Robyn Chemago	T 2–2 ^{OT}	10–9–2 (6–7–2)
January 31	at #5 Quinnipiac		TD Bank Sports Center • Hamden, CT	Robyn Chemago	L 1–3	10–10–2 (6–8–2)
February 6	Brown		Thompson Arena • Hanover, NH	Robyn Chemago	W 4–3	11–10–2 (7–8–2)
February 7	Yale		Thompson Arena • Hanover, NH	Robyn Chemago	L 2–6	11–11–2 (7–9–2)
February 13	at Colgate		Starr Rink • Hamilton, NY	Robyn Chemago	W 5–2	12–11–2 (8–9–2)
February 14	at #10 Cornell		Lynah Rink • Ithaca, NY	Robyn Chemago	W 3–2	13–11–2 (9–9–2)
February 20	#7 Clarkson		Thompson Arena • Hanover, NH	Robyn Chemago	L 1–2	13–12–2 (9–10–2)
February 21	St. Lawrence		Thompson Arena • Hanover, NH	Robyn Chemago	L 4–6	13–13–2 (9–11–2)
ECAC tournament
February 27	at #5 Clarkson*		Cheel Arena • Potsdam, NY (Quarterfinals, Game 1)	Robyn Chemago	L 0–6	13–14–2
February 28	at #5 Clarkson*		Cheel Arena • Potsdam, NY (Quarterfinals, Game 2)	Robyn Chemago	L 1–4	13–14–2
*Non-conference game. ^{#}Rankings from USCHO.com Poll.
