= 2014–15 NCAA Division I women's ice hockey rankings =

- NCAA tournament: 2015
- NCAA champion: Minnesota
- Preseason No. 1 (USA Today): Minnesota
- Preseason No. 1 (USCHO): Minnesota
- NCAA Division I women's ice hockey rankings

2014–15 NCAA Division I women's ice hockey rankings.

Two polls make up the 2014–15 NCAA Division I women's ice hockey rankings, the USCHO.com/CBS College Sports poll and the USA Today/USA Hockey Magazine poll. As the 2014–15 season progresses, rankings are updated weekly.

Legend
	Increase in ranking
	Decrease in ranking
	Not ranked previous week
Italics	Number of first place votes
(#-#)	Win–loss–tie record
т	Tied with team above or below also with this symbol

== USCHO ==
	Preseason Sep 22	Week 1 Oct 6	Week 2 Oct 13	Week 3 Oct 20	Week 4 Oct 27	Week 5 Nov 3	Week 6 Nov 10	Week 7 Nov 17	Week 8 Nov 24	Week 9 Dec 1	Week 10 Dec 8	Week 11 Dec 15	Week 12 Jan 5	Week 13 Jan 12	Week 14 Jan 19	Week 15 Jan 26	Week 16 Feb 2	Week 17 Feb 9	Week 18 Feb 16	Week 19 Feb 23	Week 20 Mar 2	Week 21 Mar 9	Week 22 Mar 23	Week 23 (Final)	
1.	Minnesota (12)	Minnesota (2–0–0) (14)	Wisconsin (6–0–0) (13)	Minnesota (5–0–1) (15)	Minnesota (7-0-1) (15)	Boston College (7–0–1) (13)	Boston College (9–0–1) (15)	Boston College (11–0–1) (15)	Boston College (13–0–1) (15)	Boston College (15-0-1) (15)	Boston College (16-0-1) (15)	Boston College (17-0-1) (15)	Boston College (17-0-1) (15)	Boston College (20-0-1) (15)	Boston College (22-0-1) (15)	Boston College (23-0-1) (15)	Boston College (25-0-1) (15)	Boston College (27-0-1) (15)	Boston College (29-1-1) (15)	Boston College (30-1-1) (13)	Boston College (32-1-2) (12)	Boston College (33-2-2) (9)	Minnesota (34-3-4) (15)		1.
2.	Wisconsin	Wisconsin (4–0–0) (1)	Minnesota (3–0–1) (2)	Wisconsin (6–2–0)	Boston College (5–0–1)	Minnesota (7–1–2) (1)	Minnesota (7–1–2)	Minnesota (9–1–2)	Minnesota (11–1–2)	Minnesota (14-1-2)	Minnesota (16-1-2)	Minnesota (16-1-2)	Minnesota (17-1-2)	Minnesota (19-1-3)	Minnesota (21-1-3)	Minnesota (23-1-3)	Minnesota (24-1-4)	Minnesota (25-2-4)	Minnesota (27-2-4)	Minnesota (29-2-4) (2)	Minnesota (31-2-4) (3)	Minnesota (31-3-4) (6)	Harvard (27-6-3)		2.
3.	Boston College	Boston College (1–0–0)	Harvard (0–0–0)	Boston College (3–0–1)	Wisconsin (8–2–0) '	Wisconsin (9–2–1)	Wisconsin (9–2–1)	Wisconsin (11–2–1) '	Wisconsin (13–2–1) '	Wisconsin (15-2-1)	Wisconsin (17-2-1)	Wisconsin (17-2-1)	Wisconsin (17-2-1)	Wisconsin (17-3-2)	Quinnipiac (20-1-3)	Wisconsin (19-4-3)	Wisconsin (21-4-3)	Wisconsin (22-4-4)	Harvard (21-4-2)	Wisconsin (24-6-4)	Wisconsin (26-6-4)	Wisconsin (28-6-4)	Boston College (34-3-2)		3.
4.	Harvard (1)	Harvard (0–0–0)	Boston College (2-0–1)	Harvard (0–0–0)	Harvard (0–0–0)	Harvard (2-0-0) (1)	Harvard (2-0-0)	Quinnipiac (9–0–1)	Quinnipiac (10–0–2)	Quinnipiac (13–0–2)	Boston University (11–3–2)	Boston University (12–3–2)	Boston University (12–3–2)	Quinnipiac (18–1–3)	Wisconsin (18–4–2)	Harvard (14-3-2)	Harvard (15-4-2)	Harvard (18-4-2)	Wisconsin (23-5-4)	Harvard (21-5-3)	Harvard (23-5-3)	Harvard (25-5-3)	Wisconsin (29-7-4)		4.
5.	Cornell	Cornell (0–0–0)	Cornell (0–0–0)	Cornell (0–0–0)	Quinnipiac (5–0–1)	Quinnipiac (7–0–1)	Quinnipiac (7–0–1)	Clarkson (9–3–1)	Clarkson (10–4–1)	Boston University (10–3–2)	Quinnipiac (13–1–3)	Quinnipiac (13–1–3)	Quinnipiac (15–1–3)	Harvard (11–2–2)	Harvard (12–3–2)	Quinnipiac (20-3-3)	Quinnipiac (21-4-3)	Quinnipiac (22-5-3)	Quinnipiac (23-6-3)	Clarkson (22-9-3)	Clarkson (24-9-3)	Boston University (25-8-3)	Boston University (25-9-3)		5.
6.	Boston University (1)	Boston University (1–1–0)	Boston University (1–1–0)	Boston University (3–1–0)	Boston University (4–2–0)	Boston University (6-2-0)	Boston University (6-2-1)	Harvard (2–1–1)	Boston University (9–3–2)	Clarkson (11–5–1)	Mercyhurst (16–2–2)	Harvard (6–2–2) T-6	Harvard (8–2–2)	Boston University (13–4–2)	Minnesota Duluth (15–6–3)	Minnesota Duluth (17–6–3)	Boston University (17–6–2)	Minnesota Duluth (17–8–5)	Boston University (20–7–2)	Quinnipiac (24–7–3)	Quinnipiac (26–7–3)	Quinnipiac (26–8–3)	Quinnipiac (26–9–3)		6.
7.	Clarkson (1)	Mercyhurst (2–0–0)	Clarkson (3-1-0)	Quinnipiac (4–0–1)	Mercyhurst (6–1–1)	Mercyhurst (8-1-1)	Clarkson (8-3-0)	Boston University (8–3–1)	Harvard (2–1–2)	Mercyhurst (14–2–1)	Minnesota Duluth (12–5–3)	Minnesota Duluth (12–5–3) T-6	Minnesota Duluth (12–5–3)	Minnesota Duluth (13–6–3)	Boston University (14–5–2) T-7	Boston University (16–6–2)	Minnesota Duluth (17–7–4)	Boston University (18–7–2)	Clarkson (20–9–3) T-7	Boston University (21–8–2)	Boston University (23–8–3)	Clarkson (24–10–3)	Clarkson (24–11–3)		7.
8.	North Dakota	Quinnipiac (1–0–0)	Mercyhurst (3-0-1)	Mercyhurst (4–1–1)	Cornell (0–0–0)	Clarkson (8-3–0)	Mercyhurst (9-2–1)	Mercyhurst (10–2–1)	Mercyhurst (12–2–1)	Minnesota Duluth (11–5–2)	Harvard (6–2–2)	Clarkson (12–6–1)	Clarkson (12–6–1)	Clarkson (13–6–2)	Clarkson (15–6–2) T-7	Clarkson (15–7–3)	St. Lawrence (16–8–3)	Clarkson (19–8–3)	North Dakota (18–11–3) T-7	North Dakota (20–11–3)	North Dakota (22–11–3)	North Dakota (22–12–3)	North Dakota (22–12–3)		8.
9.	Mercyhurst	Clarkson (1–1–0)	Quinnipiac (2-0-1)	North Dakota (4–2–0)	Clarkson (5-3–0)	Minnesota Duluth (6-4-2)	Minnesota Duluth (6-4-2)	Bemidji State (7–4–1)	Minnesota Duluth (10–4–2)	Bemidji State (8–5–1)	Bemidji State (10–5–1)	Bemidji State (11–6–1)	Mercyhurst (16-4-2)	Mercyhurst (16-4-2)	Mercyhurst (17-4-3)	St. Lawrence (14-8-3)	Cornell (12-7-3)	North Dakota (16-11-3)	Minnesota Duluth (17-10-5)	Minnesota Duluth (19-10-5)	Cornell (18-10-3)	Cornell (19-11-3)	Cornell (19-11-3)		9.
10.	Minnesota Duluth T-10	North Dakota (1–1–0)	North Dakota (3–1–0)	Clarkson (3–3–0)	Minnesota Duluth (4–4–2) T-10	North Dakota (4-5-1)	Dartmouth (4-0-0)	Minnesota Duluth (8–4–2)	Bemidji State (7–4–1)	Harvard (3–2–2)	Clarkson (12–6–1)	Mercyhurst (16–4–2)	Cornell (6–6–1) T-10	Ohio State (14–8–2)	Cornell (9–6–3)	Cornell (10–7–3)	Clarkson (16–8–3)	Cornell (14–8–3)	St. Lawrence (18–10–4)	St. Lawrence (19–10–5)	Bemidji State (20–16–1)	Bemidji State (21–17–1)	Bemidji State (21–17–1)		10.
11.	Quinnipiac T-10				North Dakota (4–4–0) T-10								Ohio State (12–8–2) T-10												11.
	Preseason Sep 22	Week 1 Oct 6	Week 2 Oct 13	Week 3 Oct 20	Week 4 Oct 27	Week 5 Nov 3	Week 6 Nov 10	Week 7 Nov 17	Week 8 Nov 24	Week 9 Dec 1	Week 10 Dec 8	Week 11 Dec 15	Week 12 Jan 5	Week 13 Jan 12	Week 14 Jan 19	Week 15 Jan 26	Week 16 Feb 2	Week 17 Feb 9	Week 18 Feb 16	Week 19 Feb 23	Week 20 Mar 2	Week 21 Mar 9	Week 22 Mar 23	Week 23 (Final)	
		Dropped: Minnesota Duluth	None	None	None	Dropped: Cornell	Dropped: North Dakota	Dropped: Dartmouth	None	None	None	None	Dropped: Bemidji State	Dropped: Cornell	Dropped: Ohio State	Dropped: Mercyhurst	None	Dropped: St. Lawrence	Dropped: Cornell	None	Dropped: Minnesota Duluth, St. Lawrence	None	None	None	

== USA Today ==
	Preseason Sep 23	Week 1 Sep 30	Week 2 Oct 7	Week 3 Oct 14	Week 4 Oct 21	Week 5 Oct 28	Week 6 Nov 4	Week 7 Nov 11	Week 8 Nov 18	Week 9 Nov 25	Week 10 Dec 2	Week 11 Dec 9	Week 12 Dec 16	Week 13 Jan 6	Week 14 Jan 13	Week 15 Jan 20	Week 16 Jan 27	Week 17 Feb 3	Week 18 Feb 10	Week 19 Feb 17	Week 20 Feb 24	Week 21 Mar 3	Week 22 Mar 10	Week 23 Mar 17	Week 24 Mar 24	
1.	Minnesota (14)	Minnesota (0–0–0) (17)	Minnesota (2–0–0) (16)	Wisconsin (6–0–0) (16)	Minnesota (5–0–1) (19)	Minnesota (7–0–1) (19)	Boston College (7–0–1) (12)	Boston College (9–0–1) (17)	Boston College (11–0–1) (19)	Boston College (13–0–1) (19)	Boston College (15–0–1) (19)	Boston College (16–0–1) (19)	Boston College (17–0–1) (19)	Boston College (17–0–1) (19)	Boston College (20–0–1) (19)	Boston College (22–0–1) (19)	Boston College (24–0–1) (19)	Boston College (25–0–1) (19)	Boston College (27–0–1) (19)	Boston College (29–1–1) (19)	Boston College (30–1–2) (19)	Boston College (32–1–2) (16)	Minnesota (31–3–4) (12)	Minnesota (32–3–4) (18)	Minnesota (34–3–4) (19)	1.
2.	Wisconsin (4)	Wisconsin (2–0–0) (2)	Wisconsin (4–0–0) (3)	Minnesota (3–0–1) (3)	Wisconsin (6–2–0)	Wisconsin (6–2–0)	Minnesota (7–1–2) (6)	Minnesota (7–1–2) (1)	Minnesota (9–1–2)	Minnesota (11–1–2)	Minnesota (14–1–2)	Minnesota (16–1–2)	Minnesota (16–1–2)	Minnesota (17–1–2)	Minnesota (19–1–3)	Minnesota (21–1–3)	Minnesota (23–1–3)	Minnesota (24–1–4)	Minnesota (25–2–4)	Minnesota (27–2–4)	Minnesota (29–2–4)	Minnesota (31–2–4) (3)	Boston College (33–2–2) (7)	Boston College (34–2–2) (1)	Harvard (27–6–3)	2.
3.	Boston College	Boston College (0–0–0)	Boston College (1–0–0)	Boston College (2–0–1)	Boston College (3–0–1)	Boston College (5–0–1)	Wisconsin (9–2–1) (1)	Wisconsin (9–2–1) (1)	Wisconsin (11–2–1)	Wisconsin (13–2–1)	Wisconsin (15–2–1)	Wisconsin (17–2–1)	Wisconsin (17–2–1)	Wisconsin (17–2–1)	Wisconsin (17–3–2)	Wisconsin (18–4–2)	Wisconsin (19–4–3)	Wisconsin (21–4–3)	Wisconsin (22–4–4)	Wisconsin (23–5–4)	Wisconsin (24–6–4)	Wisconsin (26–6–4)	Harvard (25–5–3)	Wisconsin (29–6–4)	Wisconsin (29–7–4)	3.
4.	Harvard (1)	Boston University (0–0–0)	Harvard (0–0–0)	Harvard (0–0–0)	Harvard (0–0–0)	Harvard (0–0–0)	Harvard (2–0–0)	Harvard (2–0–0)	Quinnipiac (9–0–1)	Quinnipiac (10–0–2)	Quinnipiac (13–0–2)	Boston University (11–3–2)	Boston University (12–3–2)	Boston University (12–3–2)	Quinnipiac (18–1–3)	Quinnipiac (20–3–1)	Harvard (14–3–2)	Harvard (15–4–2)	Harvard (18–4–2)	Harvard (21–4–2)	Harvard (21–5–3)	Harvard (23–5–3)	Wisconsin (28–6–4)	Harvard (26–5–3)	Boston College (34–3–2)	4.
5.	Boston University	Harvard (0–0–0)	Cornell (0–0–0)	Cornell (0–0–0)	Cornell (0–0–0)	Quinnipiac (5–0–1)	Quinnipiac (7–0–1)	Quinnipiac (7–0–1)	Clarkson (9–3–1)	Boston University (9–3–2)	Boston University (10–3–2)	Quinnipiac (13–1–3)	Quinnipiac (13–1–3)	Quinnipiac (15–1–3)	Harvard (11–2–2)	Harvard (12–3–2)	Quinnipiac (20–3–3)	Quinnipiac (21–4–3)	Quinnipiac (22–5–3)	Quinnipiac (23–6–3)	Quinnipiac (24–7–3)	Clarkson (24–9–3)	Boston University (25–8–3)	Boston University (25–9–3)	Boston University (25–9–3)	5.
6.	Cornell	Cornell (0–0–0)	Boston University (1–1–0)	Boston University (1–1–0)	Boston University (3–1–0)	Cornell (0–2–0)	Boston University (6–2–0)	Boston University (6–2–1)	Harvard (2–1–1)	Clarkson (10–4–1)	Clarkson (11–5–1)	Mercyhurst (16–2–2)	Harvard (6–2–2)	Harvard (8–2–2)	Boston University (13–4–2)	Boston University (14–5–2)	Minnesota Duluth (17-6-3)	Minnesota Duluth (17-7-4)	Minnesota Duluth (17-8-5)	Boston University (20–7–2)	Clarkson (22–9–3)	Quinnipiac (26–7–3)	Clarkson (24–10–3)	Quinnipiac (26–9–3)	Quinnipiac (26–9–3)	6.
7.	Clarkson	North Dakota (0–0–0)	Mercyhurst (2–0–0)	Clarkson (3–1–0)	Quinnipiac (4–0–1)	Boston University (4–2–0)	Clarkson (8–3–0)	Clarkson (8–3–0)	Boston University (8–3–1)	Harvard (2–1–2)	Mercyhurst (14–2–1)	Harvard (6–2–2)	Minnesota Duluth (12-5-3)	Minnesota Duluth (12-5-3)	Minnesota Duluth (13-6-3)	Minnesota Duluth (15-6-3)	Boston University (16–6–2)	Boston University (17–6–2)	Boston University (18–7–2)	Clarkson (20–9–3)	Boston University (21–8–3)	Boston University (23–8–3)	Quinnipiac (26–8–3)	Clarkson (24–11–3)	Clarkson (24–11–3)	7.
8.	North Dakota	Clarkson (0–0–0)	Quinnipiac (1–0–0)	North Dakota(3-1-0)	North Dakota(4-2-0)	Mercyhurst (6–1–1)	Mercyhurst (8–1–1)	Mercyhurst (9–2–1)	Mercyhurst (10–2–1)	Minnesota Duluth (10-4-2)	Minnesota Duluth (11-5-2)	Minnesota Duluth (12-5-3)	Clarkson (12–6–1)	Clarkson (12–6–1)	Clarkson (13–6–2)	Clarkson (15–6–2)	Clarkson (15–7–3)	North Dakota (15–10–3)	North Dakota (16–11–3)	North Dakota (18–11–3)	North Dakota (20–11–3)	North Dakota (22–11–3)	Cornell (19-11-3)	North Dakota (22–12–3)	North Dakota (22–12–3)	8.
9.	Mercyhurst	Mercyhurst (0–0–0)	Clarkson (1–1–0)	Quinnipiac (2–0–1)	Mercyhurst (4–1–1)	Clarkson (5–3–0)	North Dakota(4-5-1)	Minnesota Duluth (6-4-2)	Minnesota Duluth (8-4-2)	Bemidji State (7-4-1)	Bemidji State (8-5-1)	Clarkson (12–6–1)	Bemidji State (11-6-1)	Mercyhurst (16–4–2)	Ohio State (14–8–2)	Cornell (9–6–3)	St. Lawrence (14–8–3)	St. Lawrence (16–8–3)	Clarkson (19–8–3)	Minnesota Duluth (17-10-5)	Minnesota Duluth (19-10-5)	Cornell (18-10-3)	North Dakota (22–12–3)	Cornell (19-11-3)	Cornell (19-11-3)	9.
10.	Quinnipiac	Minnesota Duluth (1–0–1)	Northeastern (0–0–0)	Mercyhurst (3–0–1)	Clarkson (3–3–0)	North Dakota(4-4-0)	Minnesota Duluth(6-4-2)	North Dakota (4-5-1)	Bemidji State (7-4-1)	Mercyhurst (12–2–1)	Harvard (3–2–2)	Bemidji State (10-5-1)	Mercyhurst (16–4–2)	Ohio State (12–8–2)	Mercyhurst (16–4–2)	Mercyhurst (17–4–3)	Cornell (10–7–3)	Cornell (12–7–3)	Cornell (14–8–3)	Cornell (14–10–3)	St. Lawrence (19–10–5)	Minnesota Duluth (20-12-5)	Bemidji State (21-17-1)	Bemidji State (21-17-1)	Bemidji State (21-17-1)	10.
	Preseason Sep 23	Week 1 Sep 30	Week 2 Oct 7	Week 3 Oct 14	Week 4 Oct 21	Week 5 Oct 28	Week 6 Nov 4	Week 7 Nov 11	Week 8 Nov 18	Week 9 Nov 25	Week 10 Dec 2	Week 11 Dec 9	Week 12 Dec 16	Week 13 Jan 6	Week 14 Jan 13	Week 15 Jan 20	Week 16 Jan 27	Week 17 Feb 3	Week 18 Feb 10	Week 19 Feb 17	Week 20 Feb 24	Week 21 Mar 3	Week 22 Mar 10	Week 23 Mar 17	Week 24 Mar 24	
		Dropped: Quinnipiac	Dropped: North Dakota, Minnesota Duluth	Dropped: Northeastern	None	None	Dropped: Cornell	None	Dropped: North Dakota	None	None	None	None	Dropped: Bemidji State	None	Dropped: Ohio State	Dropped: Mercyhurst	Dropped: Clarkson	Dropped: St. Lawrence	None	Dropped: Cornell	Dropped: St. Lawrence	Dropped: Minnesota Duluth	None	None	
