= Emily Fulton =

Canadian ice hockey player

- Born: February 11, 1993 (age 33) Stratford, Ontario, Canada
- Height: 5 ft 4.5 in (164 cm)
- Weight: 144 lb (65 kg; 10 st 4 lb)
- Position: Forward
- Shoots: Left
- PWHL ECAC CWHL team: Bluewater Jr. Hawks; Cornell Big Red; Toronto Furies
- National team: Canada
- Playing career: 2010–present

Emily Fulton
Medal record

Women's ice hockey

Representing Canada

IIHF U18 Women's World
Gold medal – first place	2010 United States	2010 Tournament
Silver medal – second place	2011 Sweden	2011 Tournament

Emily Fulton (born February 11, 1993) is a women's ice hockey player. In April 2010, Fulton was part of the Canadian Under 18 squad that captured gold at the IIHF Under-18 World Championships. As a member of the gold medal- winning squad, a hockey card of her was featured in the Upper Deck 2010 World of Sports card series. Following her collegiate career at Cornell, she was the second pick overall in the 2015 CWHL Draft.

== Playing career ==
=== Hockey Canada ===
In April 2010, Fulton was part of the Canadian Under 18 squad that captured gold at the IIHF Under-18 World Championships. She participated in the Canada Celebrates Event on June 30 in Edmonton, Alberta, which recognized the Canadian Olympic and World hockey champions from the 2009–10 season.

=== NCAA ===
Fulton committed to join the Cornell Big Red of the ECAC. In a 9-0 win versus ECAC opponent Brown, on October 29, 2011, Fulton scored her first career NCAA goal.

=== CWHL ===
In her rookie season, Fulton was named to the 2nd Canadian Women's Hockey League All-Star Game

== Career stats ==
=== Hockey Canada ===
Year	Event	Team	GP	G	A	Pts	PIM
2009	Under 18 Nationals	Ontario Red	5	0	0	0	0
2011	Canada Winter Games	Ontario	5	2	4	6	0
2011	IIHF Under 18 Worlds	Canada	4	2	1	3	0

== Awards and honours ==
- ECAC Rookie of the Week (Week of November 21, 2011)
- Recipient of the "Nasty Elbow to the Face" award
