= Thompson Arena =

Pier Luigi Nervi building in New Hampshire

Coordinates: 43°42′04″N 72°16′49″W

Rupert C. Thompson Arena
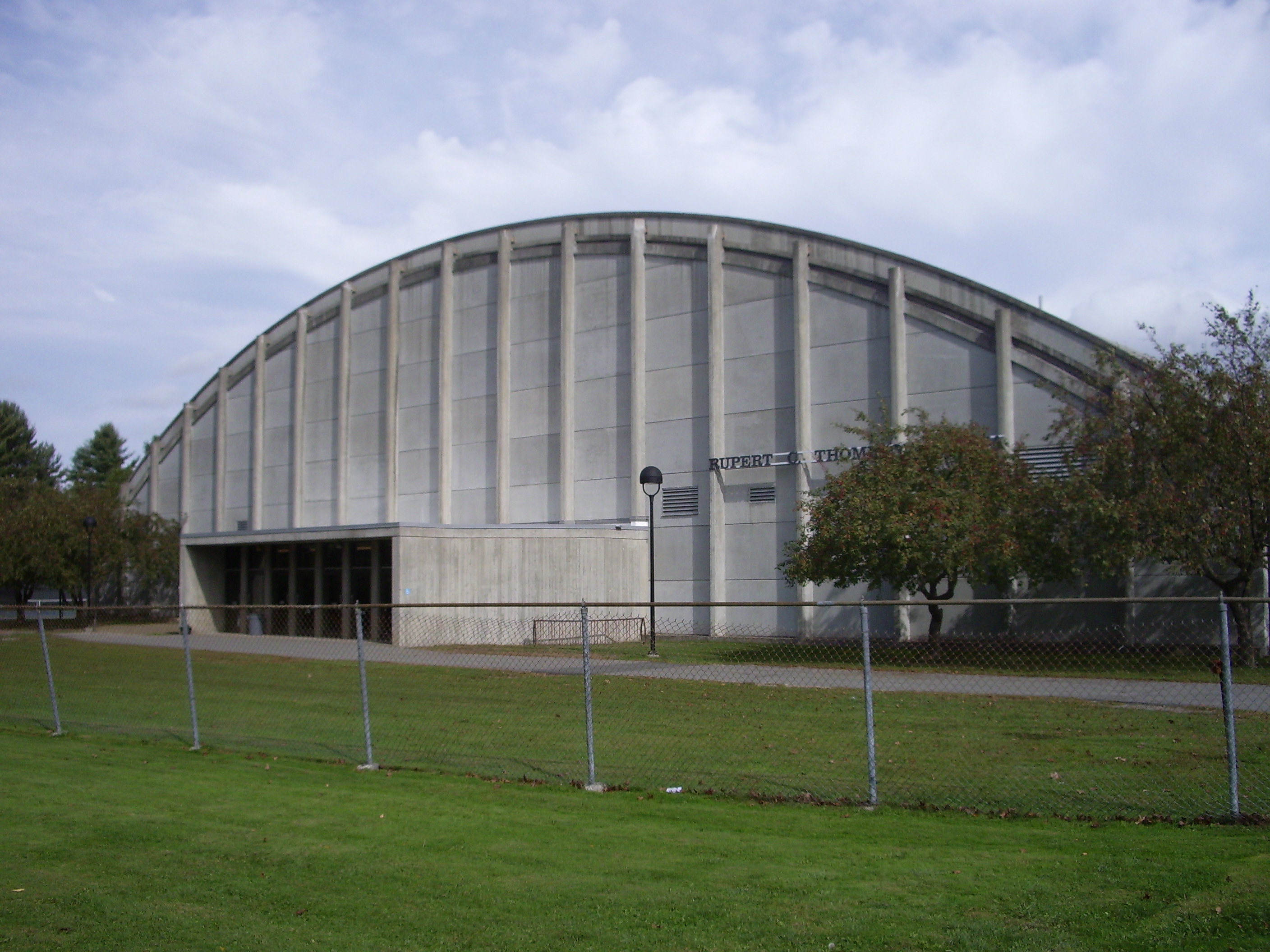
- Interactive map of Rupert C. Thompson Arena
- Location: Hanover, NH
- Owner: Dartmouth College
- Operator: Dartmouth College
- Capacity: 3,500 (hockey) (4,500 with standing room only)
- Surface: 200x85 ft (hockey)

Construction
- Groundbreaking: 1973
- Opened: November 22, 1975
- Cost: $4.4 million
- Architect: Pier Luigi Nervi

Tenants
- Dartmouth Big Green (men's and women's ice hockey)

Rupert C. Thompson Arena is a 3,500-seat hockey arena in Hanover, New Hampshire. It is home to the Dartmouth College Big Green men's and women's ice hockey teams. The barrel-vaulted, reinforced concrete arena was designed by renowned architect Pier Luigi Nervi. It was named for Rupert C. Thompson '28, the major benefactor of the project, and replaced Davis Rink, the original "indoor" home of Dartmouth hockey from 1929 to 1975. (Davis Rink, which was located next to old Alumni Gym, was demolished in 1985 to make way for the Berry Sports Center.)

The Arena has also hosted concerts, and in May 1978 featured the Grateful Dead in a packed sold-out stadium for the band's only appearance in New Hampshire.

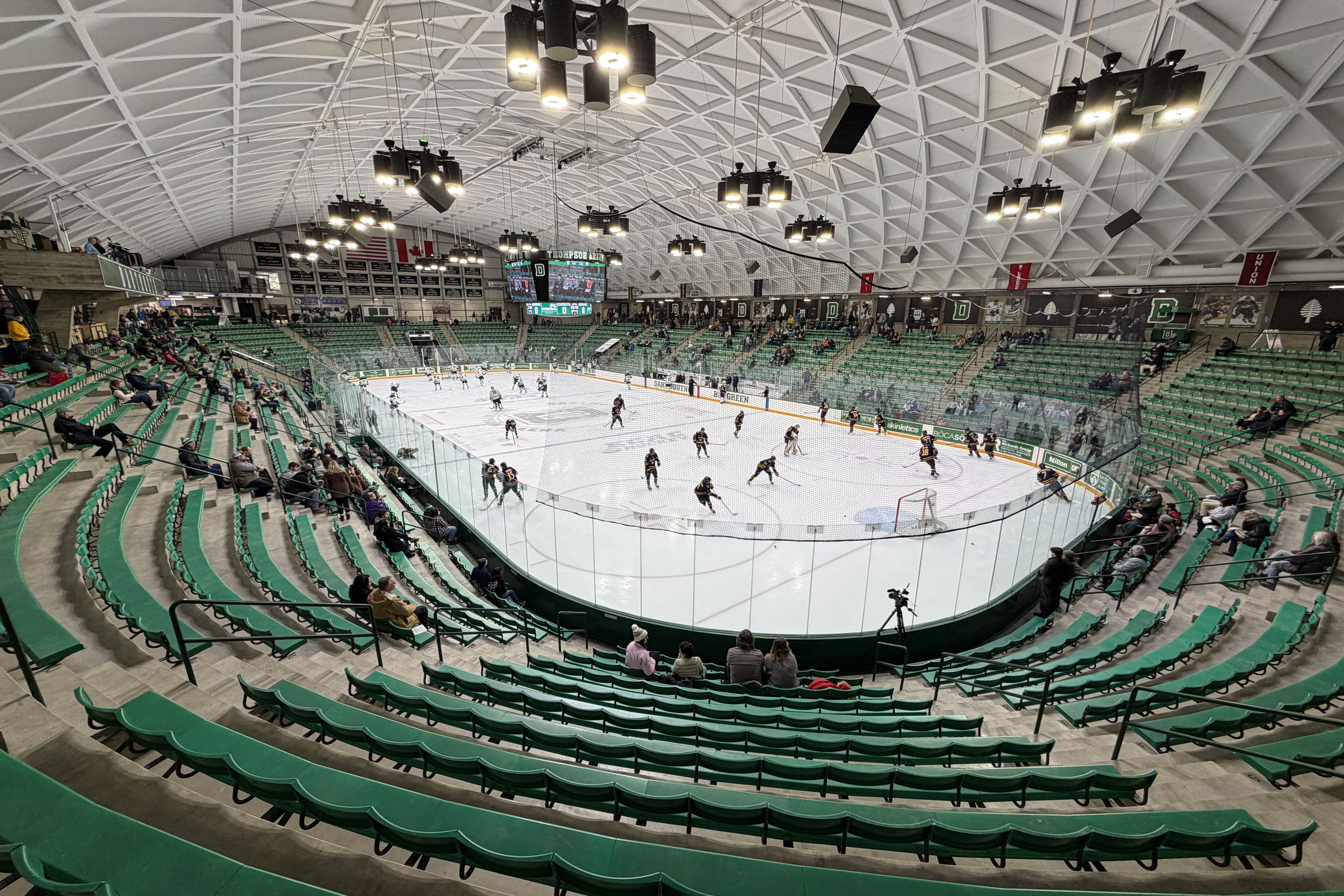
Inside

== Renovations ==
In 2016, both the men's and women's locker rooms were renovated. At the same time, the rink also got new dasher boards, glass and a refrigeration system.

In July 2025, the 50th anniversary of the Arena's opening, Dartmouth announced a 11,050-square-foot (1,027 m^{2}) renovation. The project includes a new locker room for both the men's and women's ice hockey teams, a new team lounge, weight room and coaching suite. The Arena would also receive new additions to the concourse to improve fan enjoyment. The renovation is expected to be completed in the fall of 2026.
