= Appleton Arena =

Multi-purpose arena at St. Lawrence University in Canton, New York

Coordinates: 44.5864°N 75.1660°W

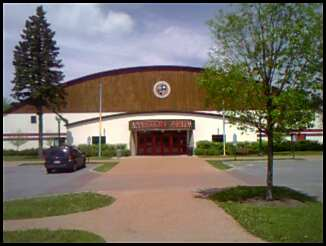
- Interactive map of Appleton Arena
- Location: 23 Romoda Drive; Canton, New York
- Owner: St. Lawrence University
- Operator: St. Lawrence University
- Capacity: 3,200 (hockey)
- Surface: 200x85 ft (hockey)

Construction
- Opened: January 6, 1951
- Renovated: 2019–2020

Tenants
- St. Lawrence University Saints (men's and women's hockey)

Appleton Arena is a 3,200-seat multi-purpose arena in Canton, New York. It is home to the St. Lawrence University Skating Saints ice hockey team. It was named for Judge Charles W. Appleton, class of 1897, the main benefactor of the arena as well as the riding center, which is named for his wife Elsa.

Appleton Arena opened in January 1951. The Canton Community assisted with the construction of an adjacent outdoor rink previous to 1951. Appleton Arena was remodeled in the late 1970s and early 1980s to its current configuration. In 1999, the facade of the arena was renovated to allow for improved locker rooms (particularly for the growing women's program) and a larger lobby. Additionally, the playing surface was expanded to 85 feet by 200 feet, and a weight training facility was added.

Aside from being home to the Skating Saints, the arena also hosts intramural hockey and broomball games, a figure skating club, and Canton Pee Wee Hockey. In addition to its athletic uses, the University has also utilized the arena for concerts and for an alternate, indoor location for graduation ceremonies.

== 2020 Renovation ==
On June 28, 2018, St. Lawrence University announced that Appleton would undergo a significant renovation and upgrade. The project would bring a new entrance and lobby, new locker rooms, expanded concourses, and technology upgrades, while the traditional wooden bleachers and roof would stay the same. Along with the project is a new fitness facility built during the project. Construction on the project began in March 2019, with the demolition of the former entrance. Due to starting late and slow process, the hockey teams announced they would play their home games at the nearby Roos House on the campus of SUNY Canton until November 2019. However, more delays forced the teams to play at the Roos House until January 2020, until Appleton was finally ready. The first game at the newly renovated Appleton Arena took place on January 18, 2020, when the St. Lawrence women's hockey team defeated cross-town rival Clarkson, 1-0. After the project was completed, the new lobby spaces featured a new box office, team store, and a widened lobby. New technology advancements featured a new streaming room, videoboards, and new LED lighting. A new VIP section was added on one of the ends giving a view straight down the ice up high.

== Trivia ==
- While Appleton Arena is generally thought of as an ice hockey rink, the first sporting event played there was a men's basketball game on January 6, 1951. St. Lawrence played the University of Toronto, winning 66–58. The first hockey game at the arena was played against Dartmouth College on January 20, 1951.
- According to David McKee, Appleton Arena is the second most difficult arena to compete in the ECACHL, after Lynah Rink.
