= 2014–15 Lindenwood Lady Lions ice hockey season =

2014–15 Lindenwood Lady Lions women's ice hockey season
- Conference: 5th College Hockey America
- Home ice: Lindenwood Ice Arena

Record
- Overall: 10-21-2
- Home: 7-10-0
- Road: 3-11-2
- Neutral: 0-0-0

Coaches and captains
- Head coach: Scott Spencer
- Assistant coaches: Cory Whitaker; Samantha Ullritch
- Captain: Tae Otte
- Alternate captain(s): Brooke Peden, Shara Jasper

The Lindenwood Lady Lions women represented Lindenwood University in CHA women's ice hockey during the 2014-15 NCAA Division I women's ice hockey season. The Lady Lions finished conference play in fifth place, and were eliminated in the first round of the CHA Tournament Final by Penn State.

== Offseason ==
- July 8: Eighteen players were named to the CHA All-Academic Team.
- August 18: Nicole Hensley was named to the 2014 Team USA U-22 Team.

== Roster ==
=== 2014–15 Lady Lions ===
No.	Nat.	Player	Class	Pos	Height	Weight	DoB	Hometown	Previous team	NHL rights
3		Rachel Weich	Junior	D	5' 5" (1.65 m)			St. Charles, Missouri	National Sports Academy	—
4		Carrie Atkinson	Sophomore	D	5' 9" (1.75 m)			Fort Worth, Texas	Dallas Stars Elite	—
5		Caitlyn Post	Senior	F	5' 6" (1.68 m)			Clarkston, Michigan	Little Caesar's	—
7		Sarah Bobrowski	Freshman	F	5' 3" (1.6 m)			Woodbury, Minnesota	Hill-Murray HS	—
9		Darby Dodds	Freshman	F	5' 8" (1.73 m)			Byron, Minnesota	Dodge County	—
10		Emily Gunderson	Freshman	F	5' 7" (1.7 m)			Dodge Center, Minnesota	Dodge County	—
11		Nicole Rash	Sophomore	F	5' 8" (1.73 m)			Edina, Minnesota	Edina HS	—
13		Tae Otte (C)	Freshman	D	5' 8" (1.73 m)			Grand Rapids, Michigan	Little Caesar's	—
16		Lyndsay Kirkham	Junior	F	5' 10" (1.78 m)			Cranbrook, British Columbia	Edge Academy	—
17		Shara Jasper (A)	Junior	F	5' 5" (1.65 m)			Aurora, Colorado	Minnesota Duluth (WCHA)	—
18		Katie Erickson	Senior	F	5' 11" (1.8 m)			Elk River, Minnesota	Elk River HS	—
19		Kaitlyn Davidson	Freshman	F	5' 9" (1.75 m)			Mars, Pennsylvania	Team Pittsburgh	—
20		Holly Dietzler	Sophomore	F	5' 5" (1.65 m)			Bloomington, Minnesota	Jefferson HS	—
21		Alyssa West	Senior	F	5' 5" (1.65 m)			Macomb, Michigan	Little Caesar's	—
22		Brooke Peden (A)	Junior	D	5' 7" (1.7 m)			Minburn, Alberta	Edmonton Thunder	—
23		Saville Pickar	Sophomore	F	5' 5" (1.65 m)			Lynnwood, Washington	Little Caesar's	—
24		Katie Nokelby	Sophomore	D	5' 11" (1.8 m)			Anchorage, Alaska	Alaska All-Stars	—
25		Xylia Lang	Freshman	D	5' 7" (1.7 m)			St. Paul, Minnesota	Roseville HS	—
26		Britainnia Gillanders	Freshman	F	5' 10" (1.78 m)			Kyle, Saskatchewan	Warner School	—
28		Jordyn Constance	Senior	F	5' 9" (1.75 m)			Calgary, Alberta	Calgary Chaos	—
29		Nicole Hensley	Junior	G	5' 6" (1.68 m)			Lakewood, Colorado	Colorado Select	—
31		Sarah McGall	Sophomore	G	5' 7" (1.7 m)			Owen Sound, Ontario	Ottawa Jr. Senators	—

== Schedule ==
Date	Opponent^{#}	Rank^{#}	Site	Decision	Result	Record
Regular Season
September 26	#2 Wisconsin*		Lindenwood Ice Arena • Wentzville, MO	Nicole Hensley	L 1–5	0–1–0
September 27	#2 Wisconsin*		Lindenwood Ice Arena • Wentzville, MO	Nicole Hensley	L 0–6	0–2–0
October 10	at St. Cloud State*		Herb Brooks National Hockey Center • St. Cloud, MN	Nicole Hensley	L 0–2	0–3–0
October 11	at St. Cloud State*		Herb Brooks National Hockey Center • St. Cloud, MN	Nicole Hensley	W 5–3	1–3–0
October 25	at Minnesota Duluth*		AMSOIL Arena • Duluth, MN	Nicole Hensley	L 1–3	1–4–0
October 26	at Minnesota Duluth*		AMSOIL Arena • Duluth, MN	Nicole Hensley	L 2–6	1–5–0
October 31	at RIT		Gene Polisseni Center • Rochester, NY	Nicole Hensley	T 1–1 ^{OT}	1–5–1 (0–0–1)
November 1	at RIT		Gene Polisseni Center • Rochester, NY	Nicole Hensley	W 3–1	2–5–1 (1–0–1)
November 7	Robert Morris		Lindenwood Ice Arena • Wentzville, MO	Nicole Hensley	L 2–3 ^{OT}	2–6–1 (1–1–1)
November 8	Robert Morris		Lindenwood Ice Arena • Wentzville, MO	Nicole Hensley	W 4–3 ^{OT}	3–6–1 (2–1–1)
November 21	at Penn State		Pegula Ice Arena • University Park, PA	Nicole Hensley	L 0–3	3–7–1 (2–2–1)
November 22	at Penn State		Pegula Ice Arena • University Park, PA	Nicole Hensley	W 2–1	4–7–1 (3–2–1)
November 28	Syracuse		Lindenwood Ice Arena • Wentzville, MO	Nicole Hensley	L 0–1	4–8–1 (3–3–1)
November 29	Syracuse		Lindenwood Ice Arena • Wentzville, MO	Nicole Hensley	W 2–1	5–8–1 (4–3–1)
December 5	at #7 Mercyhurst		Mercyhurst Ice Center • Erie, PA	Sarah McGall	L 2–6	5–9–1 (4–4–1)
December 6	at #7 Mercyhurst		Mercyhurst Ice Center • Erie, PA	Sarah McGall	L 2–5	5–10–1 (4–5–1)
January 2, 2015	#9 Bemidji State*		Lindenwood Ice Arena • Wentzville, MO	Nicole Hensley	W 1–0	6–10–1
January 3	#9 Bemidji State*		Lindenwood Ice Arena • Wentzville, MO	Sarah McGall	L 0–6	6–11–1
January 7	Minnesota State*		Lindenwood Ice Arena • Wentzville, MO	Nicole Hensley	L 1–4	6–12–1
January 9	Minnesota State*		Lindenwood Ice Arena • Wentzville, MO	Nicole Hensley	L 2–3	6–13–1
January 10	Minnesota State*		Lindenwood Ice Arena • Wentzville, MO	Nicole Hensley	W 3–1	7–13–1
January 23	at Robert Morris		RMU Island Sports Center • Neville Township, PA	Nicole Hensley	L 1–2 ^{OT}	7–14–1 (4–6–1)
January 24	at Robert Morris		RMU Island Sports Center • Neville Township, PA	Nicole Hensley	L 1–7	7–15–1 (4–7–1)
January 30	RIT		Lindenwood Ice Arena • Wentzville, MO	Nicole Hensley	L 4–5	7–16–1 (4–8–1)
January 31	RIT		Lindenwood Ice Arena • Wentzville, MO	Nicole Hensley	W 1–0	8–16–1 (5–8–1)
February 6	Penn State		Lindenwood Ice Arena • Wentzville, MO	Nicole Hensley	L 2–3	8–17–1 (5–9–1)
February 7	Penn State		Lindenwood Ice Arena • Wentzville, MO	Nicole Hensley	W 4–2	9–17–1 (6–9–1)
February 13	at Syracuse		Tennity Ice Skating Pavilion • Syracuse, NY	Nicole Hensley	T 4–4 ^{OT}	9–17–2 (6–9–2)
February 14	at Syracuse		Tennity Ice Skating Pavilion • Syracuse, NY	Nicole Hensley	L 1–3	9–18–2 (6–10–2)
February 20	Mercyhurst		Lindenwood Ice Arena • Wentzville, MO	Nicole Hensley	W 3–1	10–18–2 (7–10–2)
February 21	Mercyhurst		Lindenwood Ice Arena • Wentzville, MO	Sarah McGall	L 1–7	10–19–2 (7–11–2)
CHA Tournament
February 27	at Penn State*		Pegula Ice Arena • University Park, PA (Quarterfinals, Game 1)	Nicole Hensley	L 0–1	10–20–2
February 28	at Penn State*		Pegula Ice Arena • University Park, PA (Quarterfinals, Game 2)	Nicole Hensley	L 1–3	10–21–2
*Non-conference game. ^{#}Rankings from USCHO.com Poll.

== Awards and honors ==
- Nicole Hensley, 2014-15 All-CHA First Team
- Sharra Jasper, 2014-15 All-CHA First Team
