= 2014–15 Penn State Nittany Lions women's ice hockey season =

- Conference: College Hockey America
- Home ice: Pegula Ice Arena

Record
- Overall: 17-16-4
- Conference: 9-9-2
- Home: 9-7-2
- Road: 8-8-2
- Neutral: 0-1-0

Coaches and captains
- Head coach: Josh Brandwene (3rd season)
- Assistant coaches: Courtney Drennan; Alex Dawes
- Captain(s): Jordin Pardoski, Shannon Yoxheimer
- Alternate captain(s): Sarah Wilkie, Laura Bowman

The Penn State Nittany Lions women represented Penn State University in CHA women's ice hockey during the 2014-15 NCAA Division I women's ice hockey season. The Nittany Lions finished conference play in third place, and advanced to the CHA Tournament Semi-Final, before losing to Syracuse 2-0.

== Standings ==
2014–15 College Hockey America standings
	Conference record							Overall record					
	GP	W	L	T	PTS	GF	GA	GP	W	L	T	GF	GA
Mercyhurst^{†}	20	14	5	1	29	66	31	35	23	9	3	96	56
Syracuse	20	8	6	6	22	45	39	36	11	15	10	75	97
Penn State	20	9	9	2	20	42	46	37	17	16	4	72	88
Robert Morris	20	8	8	4	20	45	43	35	11	19	5	68	91
Lindenwood	20	7	11	2	16	40	59	33	10	21	2	57	102
RIT*	20	5	12	3	13	32	52	39	15	19	5	71	87
Championship: RIT † indicates conference regular season champion; * indicates conference tournament champion Final rankings: USCHO.com Poll

== Offseason ==
- August 25: 2014 graduate Jenna Welch signed a professional contract to play for the DEC Salzburg Eagles in the Elite Women's Hockey League.

=== Recruiting ===
Player	Position	Nationality	Notes
Hannah Ehresmann	Goaltender	United States	Attended Minnetonka (MN) High School
Irene Kiroplis	Forward/Defense	Canada	Played for Brampton Canadettes
Remi Martin	Defense	United States	Invited to USA Hockey Development Camp for three years
Caitlin Reilly	Forward	United States	Attended Benilde-St. Margaret's School
Bella Sutton	Defense	United States	Graduate of Mounds View HS
Christi Vetter	Forward	United States	Attended Lakeview North High School

== Roster ==
=== 2014–15 Nittany Lions ===
No.	Nat.	Player	Class	Pos	Height	DoB	Hometown	Previous team
1		Hannah Ehresmann	Freshman	G	5' 8" (1.73 m)		Minnetonka, Minnesota	Minnetonka HS
2		Jeanette Bateman	Junior	D	5' 6" (1.68 m)		Greeley, Colorado	Colorado Select
3		Irene Kiroplis	Freshman	F/D	5' 8" (1.73 m)		Georgetown, Ontario	Brampton Canadettes
4		Jordin Pardoski (C)	Junior	D	5' 5" (1.65 m)		Rochester Hills, Michigan	Detroit Honeybaked
5		Stephanie Walkom	Junior	D	5' 7" (1.7 m)		Moon Township, Pennsylvania	Pittsburgh Penguins Elite
6		Hannah Bramm	Junior	F	5' 7" (1.7 m)		Tampa, Florida	Minnesota Duluth (WCHA)
7		Caitlin Reilly	Freshman	F	5' 5" (1.65 m)		Chanhassen, Minnesota	Benilde-St. Margaret's
8		Christi Vetter	Freshman	F	5' 11" (1.8 m)		Lakeville, Minnesota	Lakeville North HS
9		Amy Petersen	Sophomore	F	5' 4" (1.63 m)		Minnetonka, Minnesota	Minnetonka HS
10		Micayla Catanzariti	Junior	F	5' 4" (1.63 m)		Rancho Santa Margarita, California	Gilmour Academy
11		Bella Sutton	Freshman	D	5' 6" (1.68 m)		Shoreview, Minnesota	Mounds View HS
12		Sarah Nielsen	Sophomore	F	5' 6" (1.68 m)		Edina, Minnesota	Edina HS
13		Kendra Rasmussen	Junior	F/D	5' 5" (1.65 m)		Sartell, Minnesota	Sartell/Sauk Rapids HS
15		Aly Hardy	Freshman	F	5' 7" (1.7 m)		St. Albans, Vermont	Boston Shamrocks
16		Hannah Hoenshell	Junior	F	5' 3" (1.6 m)		Plano, Texas	Alliance Bulldogs
17		Paige Jahnke	Junior	D	5' 6" (1.68 m)		Oakdale, Minnesota	Roseville HS
18		Laura Bowman (A)	Sophomore	F	5' 7" (1.7 m)		Minnetonka, Minnesota	Minnetonka HS
19		Jill Holdcroft	Junior	F	5' 1" (1.55 m)		Pennsylvania Furnace, Pennsylvania	Pittsburgh Penguins Elite
20		Emily Laurenzi	Junior	F	5' 2" (1.57 m)		Townsend, Delaware	National Sports Academy
21		Sarah Wilkie (A)	Junior	D	5' 6" (1.68 m)		Ashby, Massachusetts	Williston Northampton School
22		Remi Martin	Freshman	D	5' 6" (1.68 m)		Littleton, Colorado	Team Pittsburgh
27		Kelly Seward	Sophomore	D	5' 9" (1.75 m)		Williamsville, New York	Nichols School
30		Celine Whitlinger	Junior	G	5' 8" (1.73 m)		Garden Grove, California	Gilmour Academy
31		Amber Greene	Freshman	G	5' 3" (1.6 m)		Feeding Hills, Massachusetts	Kingswood-Oxford School
40		Shannon Yoxheimer (C)	Junior	F	5' 7" (1.7 m)		Jackson, Michigan	North American Hockey Academy

== Schedule ==
Date	Opponent^{#}	Rank^{#}	Site	Decision	Result	Record
Regular Season
October 3	at #1 Minnesota*		Ridder Arena • Minneapolis, MN	Celine Whitlinger	L 0–8	0–1–0
October 4	at St. Cloud State*		Ridder Arena • Minneapolis, MN	Hannah Ehresmann	W 3–2	1–1–0
October 11	#8 Quinnipiac*		Pegula Ice Arena • University Park, PA	Celine Whitlinger	L 0–3	1–2–0
October 12	#8 Quinnipiac*		Pegula Ice Arena • University Park, PA	Hannah Ehresmann	T 1–1 ^{OT}	1–2–1
October 17	at Union*		Achilles Center • Schenectady, NY	Celine Whitlinger	W 4–1	2–2–1
October 18	at Union*		Achilles Center • Schenectady, NY	Hannah Ehresmann	T 2–2 ^{OT}	2–2–2
October 26	Princeton*		Pegula Ice Arena • University Park, PA	Celine Whitlinger	W 2–1	3–2–2
October 27	Princeton*		Pegula Ice Arena • University Park, PA	Hannah Ehresmann	L 1–4	3–3–2
October 31	at Syracuse		Tennity Ice Skating Pavilion • Syracuse, NY	Celine Whitlinger	L 1–4	3–4–2 (0–1–0)
November 1	at Syracuse		Tennity Ice Skating Pavilion • Syracuse, NY	Hannah Ehresmann	T 2–2 ^{OT}	3–4–3 (0–1–1)
November 7	at Colgate*		Starr Rink • Hamilton, NY	Celine Whitlinger	W 6–4	4–4–3
November 8	at Colgate*		Starr Rink • Hamilton, NY	Hannah Ehresmann	W 3–1	5–4–3
November 14	at RIT		Gene Polisseni Center • Rochester, NY	Celine Whitlinger	L 0–3	5–5–3 (0–2–1)
November 15	at RIT		Gene Polisseni Center • Rochester, NY	Hannah Ehresmann	W 3–2 ^{OT}	6–5–3 (1–2–1)
November 21	Lindenwood		Pegula Ice Arena • University Park, PA	Celine Whitlinger	W 3–0	7–5–3 (2–2–1)
November 22	Lindenwood		Pegula Ice Arena • University Park, PA	Hannah Ehresmann	L 1–2	7–6–3 (2–3–1)
December 5	at Robert Morris		RMU Island Sports Center • Neville Township, PA	Celine Whitlinger	W 5–0	8–6–3 (3–3–1)
December 6	at Robert Morris		RMU Island Sports Center • Neville Township, PA	Hannah Ehresmann	L 2–4	8–7–3 (3–4–1)
December 12	#6 Mercyhurst		Pegula Ice Arena • University Park, PA	Celine Whitlinger	W 3–1	9–7–3 (4–4–1)
December 13	#6 Mercyhurst		Pegula Ice Arena • University Park, PA	Hannah Ehresmann	W 5–3	10–7–3 (5–4–1)
January 3, 2015	Ohio State*		Pegula Ice Arena • University Park, PA	Celine Whitlinger	L 1–3	10–8–3
January 4	Ohio State*		Pegula Ice Arena • University Park, PA	Hannah Ehresmann	L 0–6	10–9–3
January 17	RIT		Pegula Ice Arena • University Park, PA	Celine Whitlinger	W 2–1	11–9–3 (6–4–1)
January 18	RIT		Pegula Ice Arena • University Park, PA	Celine Whitlinger	W 3–1	12–9–3 (7–4–1)
January 23	at New Hampshire*		Whittemore Center • Durham, NH	Hannah Ehresmann	L 0–2	12–10–3
January 24	at New Hampshire*		Whittemore Center • Durham, NH	Celine Whitlinger	W 3–1	13–10–3
January 30	Syracuse		Pegula Ice Arena • University Park, PA	Celine Whitlinger	T 2–2 ^{OT}	13–10–4 (7–4–2)
January 31	Syracuse		Pegula Ice Arena • University Park, PA	Celine Whitlinger	W 4–2	14–10–4 (8–4–2)
February 6	at Lindenwood		Lindenwood Ice Arena • Wentzville, MO	Celine Whitlinger	W 3–2	15–10–4 (9–4–2)
February 7	at Lindenwood		Lindenwood Ice Arena • Wentzville, MO	Celine Whitlinger	L 2–4	15–11–4 (9–5–2)
February 13	at Mercyhurst		Mercyhurst Ice Center • Erie, PA	Celine Whitlinger	L 0–2	15–12–4 (9–6–2)
February 14	at Mercyhurst		Mercyhurst Ice Center • Erie, PA	Celine Whitlinger	L 0–4	15–13–4 (9–7–2)
February 20	Robert Morris		Pegula Ice Arena • University Park, PA	Celine Whitlinger	L 1–4	15–14–4 (9–8–2)
February 21	Robert Morris		Pegula Ice Arena • University Park, PA	Celine Whitlinger	L 1–4	15–15–4 (9–9–2)
CHA Tournament
February 27	Lindenwood*		Pegula Ice Arena • University Park, PA (Quarterfinal, Game 1)	Celine Whitlinger	W 1–0	16–15–4
February 28	Lindenwood*		Pegula Ice Arena • University Park, PA (Quarterfinal, Game 2)	Celine Whitlinger	W 3–1	17–15–4
March 6	vs. Syracuse*		Mercyhurst Ice Center • Erie, PA (Semifanal Game)	Celine Whitlinger	L 0–2	17–16–4
*Non-conference game. ^{#}Rankings from USCHO.com Poll.

== Awards and honors ==
- Laura Bowman, 2014-15 All-CHA Second Team
- Hannah Ehersmann, 2014-15 All-CHA Rookie Team
- Bella Sutton, 2014-15 All-CHA Rookie Team
