= 2014–15 New Hampshire Wildcats women's ice hockey season =

- Conference: 6th WHEA
- Home ice: Whittemore Center

Record
- Overall: 10-23-3
- Home: 4-12-1
- Road: 6-11-2

Coaches and captains
- Head coach: Hilary Witt
- Assistant coaches: Stephanie Jones; Bill Bowes
- Captain(s): Hannah Armstrong; Sara Carlson
- Alternate captain(s): Caroline Broderick; Heather Kashman

The New Hampshire Wildcats represented the University of New Hampshire in Women's Hockey East Association play during the 2014–15 NCAA Division I women's ice hockey season.

== Offseason ==
- August 6: Karyn Bye Dietz ('93) was elected into the US Hockey Hall of Fame

=== Recruiting ===
Player	Position	Nationality	Notes
Julia Fedeski	Defense	Canada	Played with Toronto Aeros
Amy Schlagel	Defense	United States	Played for Blaine (MN) HS
Kaylee Forster	Defense	United States	Played for Elk River (MN) HS
Amy Boucher	Forward	Canada	
Ali Prause	Forward	United States	Played for Benilde-St. Margaret's (MN) HS
Brooke Avery	Forward	United States	Assabet Valley
Carlee Toews	Forward	Canada	Okanagan Hockey Academy

== Roster ==
=== 2014–15 Wildcats ===
No.	Nat.	Player	Class	Pos	Height	DoB	Hometown	Previous team
1		Marie-Eve Jean	Junior	G	5' 8" (1.73 m)		Gatineau, Quebec	John Abbot College
2		Ashley Wilkes	Sophomore	G	5' 9" (1.75 m)		North Pole, Alaska	North American Hockey Academy
3		Haley Breedlove	Junior	F	6' 0" (1.83 m)		Plano, Texas	U19 Alliance Bulldogs
4		Heather Kashman (A)	Junior	F	5' 9" (1.75 m)		Edmonton, Alberta	Edmonton Thunder
5		Julia Fedeski	Freshman	D	5' 10" (1.78 m)		Algonquin Heights, Ontario	Toronto Aeros
6		Jonna Curtis	Sophomore	F	5' 4" (1.63 m)		Elk River, Minnesota	U19 Minnesota Jr. Whitecaps
7		Sara Carlson (C)	Junior	F	5' 0" (1.52 m)		Hutchinson, Minnesota	Hutchinson HS
8		Nicoline Jensen	Junior	F	5' 5" (1.65 m)		Rodovre, Denmark	Danish National Team
9		Brenna Boulanger	Senior	F	5' 9" (1.75 m)		Dover, New Hampshire	St. Thomas Aquinas
10		Amy Schlegal	Freshman	D	5' 7" (1.7 m)		Blaine, Minnesota	Blaine HS
11		Kaylee Forster	Freshman	D	5' 8" (1.73 m)		Zimmerman, Minnesota	Elk River HS
13		Amy Boucher	Freshman	F	5' 7" (1.7 m)		Edmonton, Alberta
15		Brittney Redlick	Junior	F	5' 6" (1.68 m)		Biggar, Saskatchewan	Warner Hockey School
16		Ali Praus	Freshman	F	5' 10" (1.78 m)		Long Lake, Minnesota	Benilde St. Margaret's HS
18		Kate Haslett	Freshman (RS)	D	5' 4" (1.63 m)		Rothesay, New Brunswick	Brooks School
19		Cassandra Vilgrain	Sophomore	F	5' 5" (1.65 m)		Calgary, Alberta	Edge School for Athletes
20		Margo Lund	Junior	F	5' 9" (1.75 m)		White Bear Lake, Minnesota	Hill-Murray School
21		Jess Ryan	Senior	D	5' 5" (1.65 m)		Cloquet, Minnesota	Cloquet HS
22		Caroline Broderick (A)	Senior	D	5' 9" (1.75 m)		Marblehead, Massachusetts	Ontario Hockey Academy
23		Brooke Avery	Freshman	F	5' 10" (1.78 m)		Loudon, New Hampshire	St. Paul's School
24		Kayla Mork	Senior	F	5' 5" (1.65 m)		Victoria, Minnesota	Breck School
26		Carlee Toews	Freshman	F	5' 5" (1.65 m)		Grande Prairie, Alberta	Okanagan Hockey Academy
27		Hannah Armstrong (C)	Senior	F	5' 9" (1.75 m)		Aurora, Ontario	Team Canada U18
35		Vilma Vaattovaara	Junior	G	5' 8" (1.73 m)		Veikkola, Finland	Team Finland U18

== Schedule ==
Date	Opponent^{#}	Rank^{#}	Site	Decision	Result	Record
Regular Season
September 27	at Maine		Alfond Arena • Orono, ME	Vilma Vaattovaara	L 1–2	0–1–0 (0–1–0)
October 3	at Ohio State*		OSU Ice Rink • Columbus, OH	Vilma Vaattovaara	L 0–1	0–2–0
October 4	at Ohio State*		OSU Ice Rink • Columbus, OH	Vilma Vaattovaara	L 3–4	0–3–0
October 10	at RIT*		Gene Polisseni Center • Rochester, NY	Vilma Vaattovaara	W 1–0	1–3–0
October 11	at Syracuse*		Tennity Ice Skating Pavilion • Syracuse, NY	Vilma Vaattovaara	T 2–2 ^{OT}	1–3–1
October 17	Rensselaer*		Whittemore Center • Durham, NH	Vilma Vaattovaara	W 2–1	2–3–1
October 19	#4 Boston College		Whittemore Center • Durham, NH	Vilma Vaattovaara	L 0–4	2–4–1 (0–2–0)
October 24	#7 Quinnipiac*		Whittemore Center • Durham, NH	Vilma Vaattovaara	L 1–4	2–5–1
October 26	at Dartmouth*		Thompson Arena • Hanover, NH	Vilma Vaattovaara	L 2–6	2–6–1
October 30	Northeastern		Whittemore Center • Durham, NH	Vilma Vaattovaara	L 0–2	2–7–1 (0–3–0)
November 2	at #6 Boston University		Walter Brown Arena • Boston, MA	Ashley Wilkes	L 2–4	2–8–1 (0–4–0)
November 8	Vermont		Whittemore Center • Durham, NH	Ashley Wilkes	W 5–1	3–8–1 (1–4–0)
November 15	at #1 Boston College		Kelley Rink • Chestnut Hill, MA	Vilma Vaattovaara	L 0–10	3–9–1 (1–5–0)
November 16	#1 Boston College		Whittemore Center • Durham, NH	Vilma Vaattovaara	L 0–5	3–10–1 (1–6–0)
November 23	at #7 Boston University		Walter Brown Arena • Boston, MA	Vilma Vaattovaara	L 2–6	3–11–1 (1–7–0)
November 28	#3 Wisconsin*		Whittemore Center • Durham, NH	Vilma Vaattovaara	L 0–5	3–12–1
November 29	#3 Wisconsin*		Whittemore Center • Durham, NH	Ashley Wilkes	L 0–5	3–13–1
December 5	at Providence		Schneider Arena • Providence, RI	Vilma Vaattovaara	W 5–0	4–13–1 (2–7–0)
January 10, 2015	at Providence		Schneider Arena • Providence, RI	Ashley Wilkes	L 1–3	4–14–1 (2–8–0)
January 11	Providence		Whittemore Center • Durham, NH	Vilma Vaattovaara	L 1–4	4–15–1 (2–9–0)
January 14	#5 Harvard*		Whittemore Center • Durham, NH	Vilma Vaattovaara	L 1–4	4–16–1
January 17	at Connecticut		Freitas Ice Forum • Storrs, CT	Vilma Vaattovaara	W 3–2 ^{OT}	5–16–1 (3–9–0)
January 18	at Connecticut		Freitas Ice Forum • Storrs, CT	Vilma Vaattovaara	W 3–1	6–16–1 (4–9–0)
January 23	Penn State*		Whittemore Center • Durham, NH	Vilma Vaattovaara	W 2–0	7–16–1
January 24	Penn State*		Whittemore Center • Durham, NH	Vilma Vaattovaara	L 1–3	7–17–1
January 31	Maine		Whittemore Center • Durham, NH	Vilma Vaattovaara	L 0–3	7–18–1 (4–10–0)
February 1	Maine		Whittemore Center • Durham, NH	Vilma Vaattovaara	W 4–2	8–18–1 (5–10–0)
February 7	#6 Boston University		Whittemore Center • Durham, NH	Vilma Vaattovaara	L 2–4	8–19–1 (5–11–0)
February 8	Connecticut		Whittemore Center • Durham, NH	Vilma Vaattovaara	T 2–2 ^{OT}	8–19–2 (5–11–1)
February 13	at Vermont		Gutterson Field House • Burlington, VT	Vilma Vaattovaara	W 4–2	9–19–2 (6–11–1)
February 14	at Vermont		Gutterson Field House • Burlington, VT	Vilma Vaattovaara	T 3–3 ^{OT}	9–19–3 (6–11–2)
February 21	Northeastern		Whittemore Center • Durham, NH	Ashley Wilkes	L 1–5	9–20–3 (6–12–2)
February 22	at Northeastern		Matthews Arena • Boston, MA	Ashley Wilkes	L 3–5	9–21–3 (6–13–2)
WHEA Tournament
February 27	at Northeastern*		Matthews Arena • Boston, MA (Quarterfinal Round, Game 1)	Ashley Wilkes	W 3–5	10–21–3
February 28	at Northeastern*		Matthews Arena • Boston, MA (Quarterfinal Round, Game 2)	Ashley Wilkes	L 2–3	10–22–3
March 1	at Northeastern*		Matthews Arena • Boston, MA (Quarterfinal Round, Game 3)	Ashley Wilkes	L 3–4	10–23–3
*Non-conference game. ^{#}Rankings from USCHO.com Poll.
