= 2014–15 Robert Morris Colonials women's ice hockey season =

- Conference: 4th College Hockey America
- Home ice: RMU Island Sports Center

Record
- Overall: 11–19–5
- Conference: 8-8-4
- Home: 6–10–5
- Road: 5–9–0

Coaches and captains
- Head coach: Paul Colontino (4th season)
- Assistant coaches: Logan Bittle; Chelsea Walkland
- Captain: Rebecca Vint
- Alternate captain(s): Maddie Collias, Katelyn Scott

The Robert Morris Colonials women represented Robert Morris University in CHA women's ice hockey during the 2014–15 NCAA Division I women's ice hockey season. The Colonials finished conference play in fourth place, and were eliminated in the first round of the CHA Tournament by RIT. The RMU women were among the best in the nation in blocked shots

== Offseason ==
- June 27: Twenty-one players were named to the CHA All-Academic Team.

=== Recruiting ===
Player	Position	Nationality	Notes
Leah Carey	Defense	United States	Played for the Madison Capitols
Natalie Fraser	Defense	Canada	Standout with the Ottawa Jr. Lady Senators
Jessica Gazzola	Forward	Canada	Played for the Toronto Jr. Aeros
Katherine Murphy	Forward	United States	Attended North American Hockey Academy
Amanda Pantaleo	Forward	Canada	Played for the Toronto Jr. Aeros with Jessica Gazzola

== Standings ==
2014–15 College Hockey America standings
	Conference record							Overall record					
	GP	W	L	T	PTS	GF	GA	GP	W	L	T	GF	GA
Mercyhurst^{†}	20	14	5	1	29	66	31	35	23	9	3	96	56
Syracuse	20	8	6	6	22	45	39	36	11	15	10	75	97
Penn State	20	9	9	2	20	42	46	37	17	16	4	72	88
Robert Morris	20	8	8	4	20	45	43	35	11	19	5	68	91
Lindenwood	20	7	11	2	16	40	59	33	10	21	2	57	102
RIT*	20	5	12	3	13	32	52	39	15	19	5	71	87
Championship: RIT † indicates conference regular season champion; * indicates conference tournament champion Final rankings: USCHO.com Poll

== Roster ==
=== 2014–15 Colonials ===
No.	Nat.	Player	Class	Pos	Height	DoB	Hometown	Previous team
1		Jessica Dodds	Sophomore	G	5' 7" (1.7 m)		London, Ontario	London Jr. Devilettes
2		Leah Carlson	Junior	D	5' 8" (1.73 m)		Copper Center, Alaska	Kenny Lake
3		Brittany Howard	Sophomore	F	5' 4" (1.63 m)		St. Thomas, Ontario	London Jr. Devilettes
4		Katelyn Scott (A)	Senior	F	5' 6" (1.68 m)		Brighton, Michigan	Belle Tire
6		Kelsey Gunn	Senior	D	5' 9" (1.75 m)		Smith Falls, Ontario	Niagara University
8		Megan Eady	Junior	D	5' 6" (1.68 m)		Renfrew, Ontario	Nepean Jr. Wildcats
10		Rikki Meilleur	Sophomore	F	5' 5" (1.65 m)		St. Adolphe, Manitoba	Shaftesbury Titans
11		Natalie Fraser	Freshman	D	5' 6" (1.68 m)		Ottawa, Ontario	Ottawa Jr. Lady Senators
12		Leah Carey	Freshman	D	5' 9" (1.75 m)		Middleton, Wisconsin	Madison Capitols
14		Mikaela Lowater	Sophomore	D	5' 7" (1.7 m)		Thornhill, Ontario	Mississauga Jr. Chiefs
15		Maeve Garvey	Sophomore	F	5' 4" (1.63 m)		Oakville, Ontario	Burlington Jr. Barracudas
16		Erin Staniewski	Senior	D	5' 7" (1.7 m)		Strathroy, Ontario	London Jr. Devilettes
17		Anissa Gamble	Junior	F	5' 5" (1.65 m)		Fredericton, New Brunswick	Burlington Jr. Barracudas
18		Jessica Gazzola	Freshman	F	5' 2" (1.57 m)		Thunder Bay, Ontario	Toronto Jr. Aeros
19		Katherine Murphy	Freshman	F	5' 3" (1.6 m)		Cary, North Carolina	North American Hockey Academy
21		Maddie Collias (A)	Senior	F	5' 7" (1.7 m)		Roseville, Michigan	Belle Tire
22		Ashley Vesci	Junior	F	5' 5" (1.65 m)		Pittsburgh, Pennsylvania	Lawrence Academy(MA)
24		Rebecca Vint (C)	Senior	F	5' 10" (1.78 m)		Caledon, Ontario	Brampton Jr. Thunder
26		Mackenzie Johnston	Sophomore	F	5' 7" (1.7 m)		Barrie, Ontario	Etobicoke Jr. Dolphins
27		Katie Fergus	Senior	F	5' 9" (1.75 m)		Oakville, Ontario	Burlington Jr. Barracudas
28		Amanda Pantaleo	Freshman	F	5' 5" (1.65 m)		Markham, Ontario	Toronto Jr. Aeros
29		Carley Catherine	Sophomore	G	5' 2" (1.57 m)		Bloomington, Illinois	Rochester Edge
31		Elijah Milne-Price	Freshman	G	5' 7" (1.7 m)		Mississauga, Ontario	Mississauga Jr. Chiefs

== Schedule ==
Date	Opponent^{#}	Rank^{#}	Site	Decision	Result	Record
Regular Season
September 26	Bemidji State*		RMU Island Sports Center • Neville Township, PA	Jessica Dodds	L 2–5	0–1–0
September 27	Bemidji State*		RMU Island Sports Center • Neville Township, PA	Elijah Milne-Price	L 1–3	0–2–0
October 3	at Maine*		Alfond Arena • Orono, ME	Jessica Dodds	L 2–3 ^{OT}	0–3–0
October 4	at Maine*		Alfond Arena • Orono, ME	Elijah Milne-Price	W 1–0	1–3–0
October 10	Colgate*		RMU Island Sports Center • Neville Township, PA	Jessica Dodds	L 3–6	1–4–0
October 11	Colgate*		RMU Island Sports Center • Neville Township, PA	Elijah Milne-Price	W 2–1	2–4–0
October 17	at St. Lawrence*		Appleton Arena • Canton, NY	Elijah Milne-Price	L 2–8	2–5–0
October 18	at St. Lawrence*		Appleton Arena • Canton, NY	Jessica Dodds	L 1–3	2–6–0
October 24	Northeastern*		RMU Island Sports Center • Neville Township, PA	Jessica Dodds	W 3–2	3–6–0
October 25	Northeastern*		RMU Island Sports Center • Neville Township, PA	Elijah Milne-Price	T 2–2 ^{OT}	3–6–1
October 31	at #7 Mercyhurst		Mercyhurst Ice Center • Erie, PA	Jessica Dodds	L 0–3	3–7–1 (0–1–0)
November 1	at #7 Mercyhurst		Mercyhurst Ice Center • Erie, PA	Elijah Milne-Price	L 1–4	3–8–1 (0–2–0)
November 7	at Lindenwood		Lindenwood Ice Arena • Wentzville, MO	Jessica Dodds	W 3–2 ^{OT}	4–8–1 (1–2–0)
November 8	at Lindenwood		Lindenwood Ice Arena • Wentzville, MO	Jessica Dodds	L 3–4 ^{OT}	4–9–1 (1–3–0)
November 21	Syracuse		RMU Island Sports Center • Neville Township, PA	Jessica Dodds	T 2–2 ^{OT}	4–9–2 (1–3–1)
November 22	Syracuse		RMU Island Sports Center • Neville Township, PA	Jessica Dodds	T 1–1 ^{OT}	4–9–3 (1–3–2)
November 28	Ohio State*		RMU Island Sports Center • Neville Township, PA	Jessica Dodds	L 1–5	4–10–3
December 5	Penn State		RMU Island Sports Center • Neville Township, PA	Jessica Dodds	L 0–5	4–11–3 (1–4–2)
December 6	Penn State		RMU Island Sports Center • Neville Township, PA	Jessica Dodds	W 4–2	5–11–3 (2–4–2)
January 9, 2015	at RIT		Gene Polisseni Center • Rochester, NY	Jessica Dodds	W 2–0	6–11–3 (3–4–2)
January 10	at RIT		Gene Polisseni Center • Rochester, NY	Jessica Dodds	L 2–3	6–12–3 (3–5–2)
January 16	#4 Quinnipiac*		RMU Island Sports Center • Neville Township, PA	Jessica Dodds	L 2–3 ^{OT}	6–13–3
January 17	#4 Quinnipiac*		RMU Island Sports Center • Neville Township, PA	Jessica Dodds	L 0–3	6–14–3
January 23	Lindenwood		RMU Island Sports Center • Neville Township, PA	Jessica Dodds	W 2–1 ^{OT}	7–14–3 (4–5–2)
January 24	Lindenwood		RMU Island Sports Center • Neville Township, PA	Jessica Dodds	W 7–1	8–14–3 (5–5–2)
January 30	Mercyhurst		RMU Island Sports Center • Neville Township, PA	Jessica Dodds	L 1–2 ^{OT}	8–15–3 (5–6–2)
January 31	Mercyhurst		RMU Island Sports Center • Neville Township, PA	Jessica Dodds	W 3–2	9–15–3 (6–6–2)
February 6	at Syracuse		Tennity Ice Skating Pavilion • Syracuse, NY	Jessica Dodds	L 1–2	9–16–3 (6–7–2)
February 7	at Syracuse		Tennity Ice Skating Pavilion • Syracuse, NY	Jessica Dodds	L 1–3	9–17–3 (6–8–2)
February 13	RIT		RMU Island Sports Center • Neville Township, PA	Jessica Dodds	T 2–2 ^{OT}	9–17–4 (6–8–3)
February 14	RIT		RMU Island Sports Center • Neville Township, PA	Jessica Dodds	T 2–2 ^{OT}	9–17–5 (6–8–4)
February 20	at Penn State		Pegula Ice Arena • University Park, PA	Jessica Dodds	W 4–1	10–17–5 (7–8–4)
February 21	at Penn State		Pegula Ice Arena • University Park, PA	Jessica Dodds	W 4–1	11–17–5 (8–8–4)
CHA Tournament
February 27	RIT*		RMU Island Sports Center • Neville Township, PA (Quarterfinal, Game 1)	Jessica Dodds	L 1–3	11–18–5
February 28	RIT*		RMU Island Sports Center • Neville Township, PA (Quarterfinal, Game 2)	Jessica Dodds	L 0–1	11–19–5
*Non-conference game. ^{#}Rankings from USCHO.com Poll.

== Awards and honors ==
- Mikaela Lowater, 2014–15 All-CHA Second Team
- Rebecca Vint, 2014–15 All-CHA Second Team
- Rebecca Vint finished her NCAA career as the all-time leading Point (134) and Goals (73) leader for Robert Morris
