= 2014–15 Ohio State Buckeyes women's ice hockey season =

- Conference: 6th WCHA
- Home ice: OSU Ice Rink

Record
- Overall: 17–16–3
- Home: 8–8–1
- Road: 9–8–2

Coaches and captains
- Head coach: Nate Handrahan
- Assistant coaches: Carson Duggan; Joey Olson
- Captain: Sara Schmitt
- Alternate captain(s): Kari Schmitt; Kara Gust

The Ohio State Buckeyes women's ice hockey program represented The Ohio State University during the 2014-15 NCAA Division I women's ice hockey season.

== Offseason ==
- August 12: Sara and Kari Schmitt were invited to participate in the USA Hockey Women's National Festival in Lake Placid, N.Y.

=== Recruiting ===
| Player | Position | Nationality | Notes |
|---|---|---|---|
| Jessica Dunne | Defender | United States | Member of Chicago Fury |
| Allison Gasuik | Forward | United States | Played with the Buffalo Bison |
| Selena Hunter | Goaltender | United States | Redshirt in 2014–15; attended North American Hockey Academy |
| Julianna Iafallo | Forward | United States | Played with Allison Gasuik in Buffalo |
| Alex LaMere | Goaltender | United States | 2014–15 Redshirt |
| Dani Sadek | Defender | United States | Member of Minnesota Jr. Whitecaps |
| Kassidy Sauve | Goaltender | Canada | Minded the net for the Whitby Wolves |
| Lauren Spring | Forward | Canada | Attended Pursuit of Excellence Academy |

== Roster ==
=== 2014–15 Buckeyes ===
| No. | Nat. | Player | Class | Pos | Height | DoB | Hometown | Previous team |
|---|---|---|---|---|---|---|---|---|
| 2 | | Cara Zubko | Junior | D | 5' 8" (1.73 m) | | Preeceville, Saskatchewan | Pursuit of Excellence |
| 5 | | Breanne Grant | Sophomore | D | 5' 8" (1.73 m) | | New Liskeard, Ontario | Toronto Aeros |
| 6 | | Taylor Kuehl | Senior | F | 5' 8" (1.73 m) | | Minnetrista, Minnesota | Mound Westonka HS |
| 7 | | Kayla Sullivan | Senior | F | 5' 6" (1.68 m) | | Flower Mound, Texas | Shattuck-St. Mary's |
| 8 | | Dani Sadek | Freshman | D | 5' 9" (1.75 m) | | Lakeville, Minnesota | Lakeville North HS |
| 9 | | Bryanna Neuwald | Sophomore (RS) | F | 5' 4" (1.63 m) | | Oakville, Ontario | Aurora Jr. Panthers |
| 10 | | Kara Gust (A) | Senior (RS) | F | 5' 5" (1.65 m) | | Orland Park, Illinois | Quinnipiac |
| 11 | | Allison Gasuik | Freshman | F | 5' 5" (1.65 m) | | Buffalo, New York | Buffalo Bison (WNYAHL) |
| 12 | | Haley Studler | Sophomore | F | 5' 11" (1.8 m) | | Grosse Isle, Manitoba | Balmoral Hall |
| 13 | | Jessica Dunne | Freshman | D | 6' 0" (1.83 m) | | O'Fallon, Missouri | Chicago Fury |
| 14 | | Maggie Rothgerie | Junior | F | 5' 7" (1.7 m) | | Elyria, Ohio | Mercyhurst |
| 16 | | Melani Moylan | Junior | F | 5' 6" (1.68 m) | | Mississauga, Ontario | Oakville Jr. Hornets |
| 17 | | Julia McKinnon | Junior | F | 5' 9" (1.75 m) | | Kelowna, British Columbia | Ontario Hockey Academy |
| 18 | | Julianna Iaffalo | Freshman | F | 5' 8" (1.73 m) | | Eden, New York | Buffalo Bison (WNYAHL) |
| 19 | | Danielle Gagne | Senior | F | 5' 6" (1.68 m) | | Brampton, Ontario | Mississauga Jr. Chiefs |
| 20 | | Kari Schmitt (A) | Senior | D | 5' 11" (1.8 m) | | Canton, Michigan | Belle Tire |
| 21 | | Alexa Ranahan | Sophomore | D | 5' 5" (1.65 m) | | Salmon Run, British Columbia | Okanagan Hockey Academy |
| 22 | | Sara Schmitt (C) | Senior | D | 5' 11" (1.8 m) | | Canton, Michigan | Belle Tire |
| 23 | | Katey Matheny | Sophomore | F | 5' 8" (1.73 m) | | Chesterfield, Missouri | St. Louis Lady Blues |
| 24 | | Claudia Kepler | Sophomore | F | 5' 4" (1.63 m) | | Verona, Wisconsin | Madison Capitols |
| 26 | | Kendall Curtis | Junior | F | 5' 7" (1.7 m) | | Highlands Ranch, Colorado | Colorado Selects |
| 27 | | Lauren Spring | Freshman | F | 5' 9" (1.75 m) | | Kelowna, British Columbia | Pursuit of Excellence |
| 30 | | Alex LaMere | Freshman | G | 5' 9" (1.75 m) | | Albertville, Minnesota | North Wright County HS |
| 32 | | Kassidy Sauve | Freshman | G | 5' 9" (1.75 m) | | Whitby, Ontario | Whitby Wolves |
| 35 | | Selena Hunter | Freshman | G | 5' 7" (1.7 m) | | Swarthmore, Pennsylvania | North American Hockey Academy |
| 39 | | Stacy Danczak | Junior (RS) | G | 5' 6" (1.68 m) | | Macedonia, Ohio | Ohio Flames |

== Schedule ==
| Date | Opponent^{#} | Rank^{#} | Site | Decision | Result | Record |
Regular Season
| October 3 | New Hampshire* | | OSU Ice Rink • Columbus, OH | Kassidy Sauve | W 1–0 | 1–0–0 |
| October 4 | New Hampshire* | | OSU Ice Rink • Columbus, OH | Kassidy Sauve | W 4–3 | 2–0–0 |
| October 10 | at #2 Wisconsin | | LaBahn Arena • Madison, WI | Kassidy Sauve | L 0–6 | 2–1–0 (0–1–0) |
| October 12 | at #2 Wisconsin | | LaBahn Arena • Madison, WI | Kassidy Sauve | L 0–3 | 2–2–0 (0–2–0) |
| October 17 | Bemidji State | | OSU Ice Rink • Columbus, OH | Kassidy Sauve | W 5–1 | 3–2–0 (1–2–0) |
| October 18 | Bemidji State | | OSU Ice Rink • Columbus, OH | Kassidy Sauve | W 1–0 | 4–2–0 (2–2–0) |
| October 31 | St. Cloud State | | OSU Ice Rink • Columbus, OH | Kassidy Sauve | L 2–4 | 4–3–0 (2–3–0) |
| November 1 | St. Cloud State | | OSU Ice Rink • Columbus, OH | Kassidy Sauve | W 3–0 | 5–3–0 (3–3–0) |
| November 7 | at Minnesota State | | All Seasons Arena • Mankato, MN | Kassidy Sauve | W 3–1 | 6–3–0 (4–3–0) |
| November 8 | at Minnesota State | | All Seasons Arena • Mankato, MN | Stacy Danczak | W 2–0 | 7–3–0 (5–3–0) |
| November 11 | #8 Mercyhurst* | | OSU Ice Rink • Columbus, OH | Kassidy Sauve | L 0–3 | 7–4–0 |
| November 14 | #2 Minnesota | | OSU Ice Rink • Columbus, OH | Kassidy Sauve | L 2–5 | 7–5–0 (5–4–0) |
| November 15 | #2 Minnesota | | OSU Ice Rink • Columbus, OH | Kassidy Sauve | L 3–5 | 7–6–0 (5–5–0) |
| November 21 | at North Dakota | | Ralph Engelstad Arena • Grand Forks, ND | Stacy Danczak | T 2–2 ^{OT} | 7–6–1 (5–5–1) |
| November 22 | at North Dakota | | Ralph Engelstad Arena • Grand Forks, ND | Stacy Danczak | L 3–4 | 7–7–1 (5–6–1) |
| November 28 | at Robert Morris* | | RMU Island Sports Center • Neville Township, PA | Stacy Danczak | W 5–1 | 8–7–1 |
| December 5 | #8 Minnesota Duluth | | OSU Ice Rink • Columbus, OH | Stacy Danczak | T 2–2 ^{OT} | 8–7–2 (5–6–2) |
| December 6 | #8 Minnesota Duluth | | OSU Ice Rink • Columbus, OH | Kassidy Sauve | L 1–4 | 8–8–2 (5–7–2) |
| December 19 | at #9 Bemidji State | | Sanford Center • Bemidji, MN | Stacy Danczak | W 2–0 | 9–8–2 (6–7–2) |
| December 20 | at #9 Bemidji State | | Sanford Center • Bemidji, MN | Stacy Danczak | W 2–1 | 10–8–2 (7–7–2) |
| January 3, 2015 | at [[{{{school}}}|Penn State]]* | | Pegula Ice Arena • University Park, PA | Stacy Danczak | W 3–1 | 11–8–2 |
| January 4 | at Penn State* | | Pegula Ice Arena • University Park, PA | Kassidy Sauve | W 6–0 | 12–8–2 |
| January 9 | at St. Cloud State | #10 | Herb Brooks National Hockey Center • St. Cloud, MN | Stacy Danczak | W 3–1 | 13–8–2 (8–7–2) |
| January 10 | at St. Cloud State | #10 | Herb Brooks National Hockey Center • St. Cloud, MN | Kassidy Sauve | W 4–0 | 14–8–2 (9–7–2) |
| January 16 | North Dakota | #10 | OSU Ice Rink • Columbus, OH | Stacy Danczak | L 0–1 | 14–9–2 (9–8–2) |
| January 17 | North Dakota | #10 | OSU Ice Rink • Columbus, OH | Stacy Danczak | L 0–1 | 14–10–2 (9–9–2) |
| January 30 | at #2 Minnesota | | Ridder Arena • Minneapolis, MN | Stacy Danczak | T 3–3 ^{OT} | 14–10–3 (9–9–3) |
| January 31 | at #2 Minnesota | | Ridder Arena • Minneapolis, MN | Kassidy Sauve | L 1–3 | 14–11–3 (9–10–3) |
| February 6 | Minnesota State | | OSU Ice Rink • Columbus, OH | Stacy Danczak | W 3–2 | 15–11–3 (10–10–3) |
| February 7 | Minnesota State | | OSU Ice Rink • Columbus, OH | Kassidy Sauve | W 6–0 | 16–11–3 (11–10–3) |
| February 13 | #3 Wisconsin | | OSU Ice Rink • Columbus, OH | Kassidy Sauve | L 0–2 | 16–12–3 (11–11–3) |
| February 14 | #3 Wisconsin | | OSU Ice Rink • Columbus, OH | Stacy Danczak | W 4–3 | 17–12–3 (12–11–3) |
| February 20 | at #9 Minnesota Duluth | | AMSOIL Arena • Duluth, MN | Kassidy Sauve | L 1–3 | 17–13–3 (12–12–3) |
| February 21 | at #9 Minnesota Duluth | | AMSOIL Arena • Duluth, MN | Stacy Danczak | L 2–5 | 17–14–3 (12–13–3) |
WCHA Tournament
| February 27 | at #8 North Dakota* | | Ralph Engelstad Arena • Grand Forks, ND (Quarterfinals, Game 1) | Stacy Danczak | L 2–5 | 17–15–3 |
| February 28 | at #8 North Dakota* | | Ralph Engelstad Arena • Grand Forks, ND (Quarterfinals, Game 2) | Kassidy Sauve | L 1–2 ^{3OT} | 17–16–3 |
*Non-conference game. ^{#}Rankings from USCHO.com Poll.

== Awards and honors ==
- Kassidy Sauve (Goaltender), WCHA All-Rookie Team
