= 2014–15 Vermont Catamounts women's ice hockey season =

- Conference: 7th WHEA
- Home ice: Gutterson Fieldhouse

Record
- Overall: 15-19-2
- Home: 7-9-2
- Road: 8-10-0

Coaches and captains
- Head coach: Jim Plumer
- Assistant coaches: Kelly Nash
- Captain(s): Sarah Campbell; Klara Myren; Amanda Pelkey

The Vermont Catamounts represented the University of Vermont in Women's Hockey East Association play during the 2014–15 NCAA Division I women's ice hockey season.

== Offseason ==
- August 4: Amanda Pelkey was invited to participate at the 2014 USA Hockey Women's National Festival in Lake Placid, New York.
- August 18: Amanda Pelkey (USA) and Gina Repaci (Canada) were chosen by their respective U22 National Teams for the Canada/US Series in Calgary, Alberta

=== Recruiting ===
Player	Position	Nationality	Notes
Molly Depew	Goaltender	United States	Brooks School
Kourtney Menches	Forward	United States	Shattuck-St. Mary's
Bella Webster	Forward	United States	Chicago Mission
Mackenzie MacNeil	Forward	Canada	Toronto Aeros
Katherine Pate	Defense	United States	Assabet Valley
Amanda Drobot	Defense	United States	New Jersey Colonials
Taylor Willard	Defense	United States	US National Team U18

== Roster ==
=== 2014–15 Catamounts ===
No.	Nat.	Player	Class	Pos	Height	DoB	Hometown	Previous team
1		Molly Depew	Freshman	G	5' 8" (1.73 m)		Marblehead, Massachusetts	Brooks School
2		Kourtney Menches	Freshman	F	5' 2" (1.57 m)		Greer, South Carolina	Shattuck-St. Mary's
5		Casey Leveillee	Sophomore	F	5' 6" (1.68 m)		Delanson, New York	Northfield Mount Hermon
7		Rachel Ade	Sophomore	D	5' 9" (1.75 m)		Davenport, Florida	Boston Shamrocks
8		Bella Webster	Freshman	F	5' 6" (1.68 m)		Bensenville, Illinois	Chicago Mission
9		Dayna Colang	Junior	F	5' 7" (1.7 m)		Fairbanks, Alaska	North American Hockey Academy
10		Mackenzie MacNeil	Freshman	F	5' 8" (1.73 m)		Richmond Hill, Ontario	Toronto Aeros
11		Katherine Pate	Freshman	D	5' 2" (1.57 m)		Saco, Maine	Assabet Valley
12		Amanda Drobot	Freshman	D	5' 6" (1.68 m)		Churchville, Pennsylvania	New Jersey Colonials
13		Gina Repaci	Junior	D	5' 8" (1.73 m)		Toronto, Ontario	Mississauga Jr. Chiefs
16		Bridget Baker	Sophomore	F	5' 3" (1.6 m)		Los Gatos, California
17		Delia McNally	Senior	F	5' 11" (1.8 m)		Glen Head, New York	Berkshire Academy
18		Cassidy Campeau	Sophomore	F	5' 6" (1.68 m)		Nepean, Ontario	Nepean Wildcats
19		Brittany Zuback	Senior	F	5' 6" (1.68 m)		Thunder Bay, Ontario	Kitchener-Waterloo Rangers
21		Amanda Pelkey (C)	Senior	F	5' 3" (1.6 m)		Montpelier, Vermont	North American Hockey Academy
22		Sarah Kelly	Sophomore	F	5' 5" (1.65 m)		Vestal, New York	North American Hockey Academy
26		Sarah Campbell (C)	Senior	D	5' 4" (1.63 m)		Saratoga Springs, New York	North American Hockey Academy
27		Taylor Willard	Freshman	D	5' 6" (1.68 m)		Naperville, Illinois	US National Team U18
30		Madison Litchfield	Sophomore	G	5' 4" (1.63 m)		Williston, Vermont	Boston Shamrocks
33		Klara Myren (C)	Senior	F	5' 8" (1.73 m)		Gustafs, Sweden	Leksands IF
44		Victoria Andreakos	Junior	F	5' 6" (1.68 m)		Aurora, Ontario	Toronto Aeros (])

== Schedule ==
Date	Opponent^{#}	Rank^{#}	Site	Decision	Result	Record
Regular Season
October 4	at #8 North Dakota*		Ralph Engelstad Arena • Grand Forks, ND	Madison Litchfield	W 3–1	1–0–0
October 5	at Bemidji State*		Sanford Center • Bemidji, MN	Madison Litchfield	L 0–4	1–1–0
October 11	at Rensselaer*		Houston Field House • Troy, NY	Madison Litchfield	W 4–2	2–1–0
October 12	Rensselaer*		Gutterson Field House • Burlington, VT	Madison Litchfield	T 2–2 ^{OT}	2–1–1
October 18	RIT*		Gutterson Field House • Burlington, VT	Madison Litchfield	W 2–1	3–1–1
October 19	RIT*		Gutterson Field House • Burlington, VT	Madison Litchfield	L 0–2	3–2–1
October 24	Union*		Gutterson Field House • Burlington, VT	Madison Litchfield	W 4–0	4–2–1
October 25	Union*		Gutterson Field House • Burlington, VT	Molly Depew	W 4–0	5–2–1
November 2	Connecticut		Gutterson Field House • Burlington, VT	Madison Litchfield	W 6–0	6–2–1 (1–0–0)
November 8	at New Hampshire		Whittemore Center • Durham, NH	Madison Litchfield	L 1–5	6–3–1 (1–1–0)
November 9	at #1 Boston College		Kelley Rink • Chestnut Hill, MA	Madison Litchfield	L 2–4	6–4–1 (1–2–0)
November 14	at Syracuse*		Tennity Ice Skating Pavilion • Syracuse, NY	Madison Litchfield	W 6–5 ^{OT}	7–4–1
November 15	at Syracuse*		Tennity Ice Skating Pavilion • Syracuse, NY	Molly Depew	W 5–4	8–4–1
November 22	at Northeastern		Matthews Arena • Boston, MA	Madison Litchfield	L 3–7	8–5–1 (1–3–0)
November 23	at Northeastern		Matthews Arena • Boston, MA	Molly Depew	L 1–5	8–6–1 (1–4–0)
November 29	Maine		Gutterson Field House • Burlington, VT	Madison Litchfield	L 0–3	8–7–1 (1–5–0)
November 30	Maine		Gutterson Field House • Burlington, VT	Madison Litchfield	L 1–2	8–8–1 (1–6–0)
December 6	#5 Boston University		Gutterson Field House • Burlington, VT	Madison Litchfield	L 1–4	8–9–1 (1–7–0)
December 14	Dartmouth*		Gutterson Field House • Burlington, VT	Madison Litchfield	L 2–6	8–10–1
January 2, 2015	Colgate*		Gutterson Field House • Burlington, VT	Madison Litchfield	W 3–2	9–10–1
January 3	Colgate*		Gutterson Field House • Burlington, VT	Molly Depew	W 3–2	10–10–1
January 10	at Connecticut		Freitas Ice Forum • Storrs, CT	Madison Litchfield	L 1–5	10–11–1 (1–8–0)
January 11	at Connecticut		Freitas Ice Forum • Storrs, CT	Molly Depew	L 3–4	10–12–1 (1–9–0)
January 17	#1 Boston College		Gutterson Field House • Burlington, VT	Molly Depew	L 0–4	10–13–1 (1–10–0)
January 18	#1 Boston College		Gutterson Field House • Burlington, VT	Madison Litchfield	L 0–2	10–14–1 (1–11–0)
January 24	at #7 Boston University		Walter Brown Arena • Boston, MA	Madison Litchfield	W 2–0	11–14–1 (2–11–0)
January 25	at #7 Boston University		Walter Brown Arena • Boston, MA	Molly Depew	L 2–9	11–15–1 (2–12–0)
January 30	Northeastern		Gutterson Field House • Burlington, VT	Madison Litchfield	L 3–4	11–16–1 (2–13–0)
February 1	Providence		Gutterson Field House • Burlington, VT	Madison Litchfield	W 7–3	12–16–1 (3–13–0)
February 7	at Maine		Alfond Arena • Orono, ME	Madison Litchfield	W 2–1 ^{OT}	13–16–1 (4–13–0)
February 13	New Hampshire		Gutterson Fieldhouse • Burlington, VT	Madison Litchfield	L 2–4	13–17–1 (4–14–0)
February 14	New Hampshire		Gutterson Fieldhouse • Burlington, VT	Madison Litchfield	T 3–3 ^{OT}	13–17–2 (4–14–1)
February 21	at Providence		Schneider Arena • Providence, RI	Madison Litchfield	W 3–2	14–17–2 (5–14–1)
February 22	at Providence		Schneider Arena • Providence, RI	Madison Litchfield	W 3–2	15–17–2 (6–14–1)
WHEA Tournament
February 27	at #7 Boston University*		Walter Brown Arena • Boston, MA (Quarterfinal, Game 1)	Madison Litchfield	L 1–8	15–18–2
February 28	at #7 Boston University*		Walter Brown Arena • Boston, MA (Quarterfinal, Game 2)	Madison Litchfield	L 2–7	15–19–2
*Non-conference game. ^{#}Rankings from USCHO.com Poll.

== Awards and honors ==
- Dayna Colang named Honorable Mention WHEA All-Star.

== Miscellaneous ==
- Amanda Pelkey signed with the Boston Pride of the NWHL
