= 2014–15 RIT Tigers women's ice hockey season =

CHA Tournament Champions NCAA Quarterfinals, L 2–6 at Minnesota
- Conference: #6 CHA
- Home ice: Gene Polisseni Center, Rochester, NY

Record
- Overall: 15–19–5
- Home: 6–8–2
- Road: 8–11–3
- Neutral: 1–0

Coaches and captains
- Head coach: Scott McDonald (9th season)
- Captain(s): Lindsay Grigg; Celeste Brown
- Alternate captain(s): Morgan Scoyne; Taylor Thurston

The RIT Tigers represented the Rochester Institute of Technology in College Hockey America during the 2014-15 NCAA Division I women's ice hockey season. In their third year at the Division I level, the Tigers repeated as CHA Tournament champions and secured their first berth in the NCAA tournament.

== Offseason ==
- August 8: It was announced by the NCAA that the RIT Tigers have passed their two-year probation and have qualified to become a full-fledged member of NCAA Division I hockey as of the 2014-15 campaign. Of note, the Tigers are now eligible to qualify for the NCAA Tournament and gain the opportunity to bid for hosting rights for future NCAA Tournaments.

== Standings ==
2014–15 College Hockey America standings
	Conference record							Overall record					
	GP	W	L	T	PTS	GF	GA	GP	W	L	T	GF	GA
Mercyhurst^{†}	20	14	5	1	29	66	31	35	23	9	3	96	56
Syracuse	20	8	6	6	22	45	39	36	11	15	10	75	97
Penn State	20	9	9	2	20	42	46	37	17	16	4	72	88
Robert Morris	20	8	8	4	20	45	43	35	11	19	5	68	91
Lindenwood	20	7	11	2	16	40	59	33	10	21	2	57	102
RIT*	20	5	12	3	13	32	52	39	15	19	5	71	87
Championship: RIT † indicates conference regular season champion; * indicates conference tournament champion Final rankings: USCHO.com Poll

=== Recruiting ===
Player	Position	Nationality	Notes
Lauren Carroll	Defense	Canada	Oakville Jr. Hornets
Maddie Grisko	Defense	United States	Buffalo Bisons
Darcy Henderson	Forward	Canada	Burlington Jr. Barracudas
Victoria Pitawanakwat	Forward	Canada	Sudbury Lady Wolves
Christa Vuglar	Defense	United States	Chicago Mission

==== Transfer ====
Player	Position	Nationality	Former School
Haley Northcote	Defense	Canada	Minnesota State University

== News and notes ==
- March 7: Double overtime was required in order for RIT to claim their second consecutive CHA Tournament title. A 2-1 win against Syracuse resulted in the longest contest in Syracuse history. The first goal of the game was scored by Syracuse in the second period. Lindsay Grigg tied the game in the third, with assists being credited to Caitlin Wallace and Taylor Thurston. Carly Payerl logged the overtime-winning tally against Syracuse backstop Jenn Gilligan in double overtime.

== Roster ==
=== 2014–15 Tigers ===
No.	Nat.	Player	Class	Pos	Height	DoB	Hometown	Previous team
2		Taylor Thurston (A)	Sophomore	D	5' 6" (1.68 m)		Kanata, Ontario	Nepean Wildcats
3		Morgan Scoyne (A)	Senior	D	5' 8" (1.73 m)		Drumbo, Ontario	Stoney Creek Sabres
4		Caitlin Wallace	Sophomore	F	5' 9" (1.75 m)		Brantford, Ontario	Stoney Creek Sabres
5		Haley Northcote	Junior	D	5' 7" (1.7 m)		Cumberland, Ontario	Minnesota State
9		Lindsay Stenason	Sophomore	F/D	5' 6" (1.68 m)		Oakville, Ontario	Oakville Hornets
11		Christa Vuglar	Freshman	D	5' 3" (1.6 m)		Crystal Lake, Illinois	Chicago Mission
13		Darcy Henderson	Freshman	F	5' 7" (1.7 m)		Burlington, Ontario	Burlington Barracudas
14		Mackenzie Stone	Sophomore	F	5' 8" (1.73 m)		Kars, Ontario	Nepean Wildcats
15		Kolbee McRea	Senior	F	5' 9" (1.75 m)		Wawa, Ontario	Burlington Barracudas
16		Maddie Grisko	Freshman	D	5' 6" (1.68 m)		Buffalo, New York	Buffalo Bisons
17		Carly Payerl	Junior	F	5' 9" (1.75 m)		Kitchener, Ontario	Waterloo K-W Rangers
18		Lauren Carroll	Freshman	D	5' 10" (1.78 m)		Carlisle, Ontario	Oakville Hornets
19		Marissa Maugeri	Senior	F	5' 3" (1.6 m)		Ajax, Ontario	Durham West Lightning
21		Emilee Bulleid	Senior	D	5' 5" (1.65 m)		Waterdown, Ontario	Stoney Creek Sabres
22		Victoria Pitawanakwat	Freshman	F	5' 9" (1.75 m)		Manitowaning, Ontario	Sudbury Wolves
23		Lindsay Grigg (C)	Senior	F/D	5' 6" (1.68 m)		Oakville, Ontario	Oakville Hornets
24		Celeste Brown (C)	Senior	F	5' 6" (1.68 m)		Great Falls, Montana	National Sports Academy
25		Cassie Clayton	Sophomore	F	5' 6" (1.68 m)		Pickering, Ontario	Mississauga Jr. Chiefs
27		Jess Paton	Junior	F	5' 4" (1.63 m)		Woodstock, Ontario	Waterloo K-W Rangers
34		Brooke Stoddart	Sophomore	G	5' 6" (1.68 m)		Elmvale, Ontario	Brampton Thunder
35		Jetta Rackleff	Junior	G	5' 8" (1.73 m)		Bend, Oregon	Anaheim Lady Ducks
39		Ali Binnington	Senior	G	5' 9" (1.75 m)		Oakville, Ontario	Mississauga Jr. Chiefs

== Schedule ==
Date	Opponent^{#}	Rank^{#}	Site	Decision	Result	Record
Regular Season
October 3	Union*		Gene Polisseni Center • Rochester, NY	Ali Binnington	W 2–1	1–0–0
October 4	Union*		Gene Polisseni Center • Rochester, NY	Ali Binnington	W 2–0	2–0–0
October 10	New Hampshire*		Gene Polisseni Center • Rochester, NY	Ali Binnington	L 0–1	2–1–0
October 11	Northeastern*		Gene Polisseni Center • Rochester, NY	Brooke Stoddart	T 2–2 ^{OT}	2–1–1
October 18	at Vermont*		Gutterson Fieldhouse • Burlington, VT	Ali Binnington	L 1–2	2–2–1
October 19	at Vermont*		Gutterson Fieldhouse • Burlington, VT	Ali Binnington	W 2–0	3–2–1
October 24	at Brown*		Meehan Auditorium • Providence, RI	Ali Binnington	W 4–1	4–2–1
October 25	at Brown*		Meehan Auditorium • Providence, RI	Brooke Stoddart	W 5–2	5–2–1
October 31	Lindenwood		Gene Polisseni Center • Rochester, NY	Ali Binnington	T 1–1 ^{OT}	5–2–2 (0–0–1)
November 1	Lindenwood		Gene Polisseni Center • Rochester, NY	Ali Binnington	L 1–3	5–3–2 (0–1–1)
November 7	at Princeton*		Hobey Baker Rink • Princeton, NJ	Brooke Stoddart	L 3–4 ^{OT}	5–4–2
November 8	at Princeton*		Hobey Baker Rink • Princeton, NJ	Jetta Rackleff	T 0–0 ^{OT}	5–4–3
November 14	Penn State		Gene Polisseni Center • Rochester, NY	Ali Binnington	W 3–0	6–4–3 (1–1–1)
November 15	Penn State		Gene Polisseni Center • Rochester, NY	Ali Binnington	L 2–3 ^{OT}	6–5–3 (1–2–1)
November 21	at #8 Mercyhurst		Mercyhurst Ice Center • Erie, PA	Jetta Rackleff	L 1–4	6–6–3 (1–3–1)
November 22	at #8 Mercyhurst		Mercyhurst Ice Center • Erie, PA	Jetta Rackleff	L 1–4	6–7–3 (1–4–1)
November 28	at Rensselaer*		Houston Field House • Troy, NY	Brooke Stoddart	L 1–4	6–8–3
November 29	at Rensselaer*		Houston Field House • Troy, NY	Jetta Rackleff	W 3–0	7–8–3
December 6	at Syracuse		Tennity Ice Skating Pavilion • Syracuse, NY	Jetta Rackleff	L 2–4	7–9–3 (1–5–1)
December 12	North Dakota*		Gene Polisseni Center • Rochester, NY	Jetta Rackleff	L 1–3	7–10–3
December 13	North Dakota*		Gene Polisseni Center • Rochester, NY	Jetta Rackleff	L 1–6	7–11–3
January 9, 2015	Robert Morris		Gene Polisseni Center • Rochester, NY	Ali Binnington	L 0–2	7–12–3 (1–6–1)
January 10	Robert Morris		Gene Polisseni Center • Rochester, NY	Ali Binnington	W 3–2	8–12–3 (2–6–1)
January 17	at Penn State		Pegula Ice Arena • University Park, PA	Ali Binnington	L 1–2	8–13–3 (2–7–1)
January 18	at Penn State		Pegula Ice Arena • University Park, PA	Ali Binnington	L 1–3	8–14–3 (2–8–1)
January 23	Syracuse		Gene Polisseni Center • Rochester, NY	Ali Binnington	W 4–3 ^{OT}	9–14–3 (3–8–1)
January 30	at Lindenwood		Lindenwood Ice Arena • Wentzville, MO	Brooke Stoddart	W 5–4 ^{OT}	10–14–3 (4–8–1)
January 31	at Lindenwood		Lindenwood Ice Arena • Wentzville, MO	Brooke Stoddart	L 0–1	10–15–3 (4–9–1)
February 6	Mercyhurst		Gene Polisseni Center • Rochester, NY	Ali Binnington	L 1–5	10–16–3 (4–10–1)
February 7	Mercyhurst		Gene Polisseni Center • Rochester, NY	Ali Binnington	L 0–3	10–17–3 (4–11–1)
February 13	at Robert Morris		RMU Island Sports Center • Neville Township, PA	Ali Binnington	T 2–2 ^{OT}	10–17–4 (4–11–2)
February 14	at Robert Morris		RMU Island Sports Center • Neville Township, PA	Ali Binnington	T 2–2 ^{OT}	10–17–5 (4–11–3)
February 20	at Syracuse		Tennity Ice Skating Pavilion • Syracuse, NY	Ali Binnington	L 1–4	10–18–5 (4–12–3)
February 21	Syracuse		Gene Polisseni Center • Rochester, NY	Ali Binnington	W 1–0	11–18–5 (5–12–3)
CHA Tournament
February 27	at Robert Morris*		RMU Island Sports Center • Neville Township, PA (Quarterfinal, Game 1)	Ali Binnington	W 3–1	12–18–5
February 28	at Robert Morris*		RMU Island Sports Center • Neville Township, PA (Quarterfinal, Game 2)	Ali Binnington	W 1–0	13–18–5
March 6	at Mercyhurst*		Mercyhurst Ice Center • Erie, PA (Semifinal Game)	Ali Binnington	W 4–1	14–18–5
March 7	vs. Syracuse*		Mercyhurst Ice Center • Erie, PA (CHA Championship Game)	Ali Binnington	W 2–1 ^{2OT}	15–18–5
NCAA Tournament
March 14	at Minnesota*		Ridder Arena • Minneapolis, MN (Quarterfinal Game)	Ali Binnington	L 2–6	15–19–5
*Non-conference game. ^{#}Rankings from USCHO.com Poll.

== Awards and honors ==
- Lindsay Grigg
  CHA Best Defensive Forward
- Taylor Thurston
  CHA Individual Sportsmanship
- Christa Vuglar
  CHA All- Rookie Team
