= 2014–15 Mercyhurst Lakers women's ice hockey season =

CHA Regular Season Champions
- Conference: 1st College Hockey America
- Home ice: Mercyhurst Ice Center

Record
- Overall: 23-9-3
- Conference: 14-5-1
- Home: 16-2-1
- Road: 7-7-2

Coaches and captains
- Head coach: Michael Sisti (16th season)
- Assistant coaches: Delaney Collins
- Captain(s): Emily Janiga; Caroline Luczak
- Alternate captain(s): Molly Byrne; Shelby Bram

The Mercyhurst Lakers represented Mercyhurst University in CHA women's ice hockey during the 2014-15 NCAA Division I women's ice hockey season. The Lakers were the regular season champions of the College Hockey America Conference (CHA), and lost the conference tournament final game to RIT.

== Standings ==
2014–15 College Hockey America standings
	Conference record							Overall record					
	GP	W	L	T	PTS	GF	GA	GP	W	L	T	GF	GA
Mercyhurst^{†}	20	14	5	1	29	66	31	35	23	9	3	96	56
Syracuse	20	8	6	6	22	45	39	36	11	15	10	75	97
Penn State	20	9	9	2	20	42	46	37	17	16	4	72	88
Robert Morris	20	8	8	4	20	45	43	35	11	19	5	68	91
Lindenwood	20	7	11	2	16	40	59	33	10	21	2	57	102
RIT*	20	5	12	3	13	32	52	39	15	19	5	71	87
Championship: RIT † indicates conference regular season champion; * indicates conference tournament champion Final rankings: USCHO.com Poll

== Offseason ==
- August 4: Emily Janiga earned an invitation to the 2014 USA Hockey Women's National Festival in Lake Placid, New York. The festival shall determine the roster of the Under-22 team that shall compete in a three-game series versus the Canadian U22/Development Squad from Aug. 21-24 in Calgary.

=== Recruiting ===
Player	Position	Nationality	Notes
Jessica Convery	Goaltender	United States	Played with Detroit Honeybaked
Brooke Hartwick	Forward	Canada	Competed with Bluewater Jr. Hawks
Jennifer MacAskill	Forward	Canada	Member of Oakville Hornets
Kirsten Miller	Forward	Canada	Teammate of MacAskill with Oakville Hornets
Callie Paddock	Defense	Canada	Tallest recruit at 5-11
Sarah Robello	Forward	United States	Competed with Boston Shamrocks

== Roster ==
=== 2014–15 Lakers ===
No.	Nat.	Player	Class	Pos	Height	DoB	Hometown	Previous team
4		Emily Janiga (C)	Junior	F	5' 10" (1.78 m)		East Aurora, New York	Nichols School
5		Molly Byrne (A)	Senior	D	5' 9" (1.75 m)		Plymouth, Minnesota	Shattuck-St. Mary's
6		Taylor Accursi	Sophomore	F	5' 8" (1.73 m)		Ancaster, Ontario	Burlington Barracudas
7		Hannah Bale	Junior	F	5' 11" (1.8 m)		Oakville, Ontario	Stoney Creek Jr. Sabres
9		Kirsten Miller	Freshman	F	5' 9" (1.75 m)		Oakville, Ontario	Oakville Jr. Hornets
10		Megan Whiddon	Sophomore	F	5' 5" (1.65 m)		Corona, California	National Sports Academy
11		Jennifer MacAskill	Freshman	F	5' 5" (1.65 m)		Auld's Cove, Nova Scotia	Oakville Jr. Hornets
13		Shelby Bram (A)	Senior	F	5' 3" (1.6 m)		Ste. Anne, Manitoba	Eastman Selects
15		Paige Horton	Sophomore	D	5' 11" (1.8 m)		St. Thomas, Ontario	London Jr. Devilettes
16		Jenna Dingeldein	Junior	F	6' 1" (1.85 m)		Toronto, Ontario	Toronto Aeros
18		J'nai Mahadeo	Junior	D	5' 8" (1.73 m)		Airdrie, Alberta	Edge School
19		Sarah Robello	Freshman	F	5' 4" (1.63 m)		Las Vegas, Nevada	Boston Shamrocks
20		Kathy Donohue	Junior	F	5' 5" (1.65 m)		Rochester, New York	North American Hockey Academy
21		Callie Paddock	Freshman	D	5' 11" (1.8 m)		Wawa, Ontario	St. Mary's Academy
24		Jaclyn Arbour	Junior	F	5' 9" (1.75 m)		South Setauket, New York	National Sports Academy
25		Jillian Skinner	Sophomore	D	5' 6" (1.68 m)		Markham, Ontario	Mississauga Jr. Chiefs
26		Caroline Luczak (C)	Senior	D	5' 10" (1.78 m)		Midhurst, Ontario	Toronto Jr. Aeros
27		Brooke Hartwick	Freshman	F	5' 7" (1.7 m)		London, Ontario	Brampton Jr. Canadettes
28		Lauren Kilroy	Junior	D	5' 7" (1.7 m)		Cypress, California	North American Hockey Academy
29		Julia DiTondo	Junior	G	5' 10" (1.78 m)		Kenmore, New York	Nichols School
34		Amanda Makela	Senior	G	5' 9" (1.75 m)		Thunder Bay, Ontario	Thunder Bay Queens
37		Jessica Convery	Freshman	G	5' 7" (1.7 m)		Commerce Township, Michigan	Honeybaked

== Schedule ==
Date	Opponent^{#}	Rank^{#}	Site	Decision	Result	Record
Regular Season
October 3	Providence*	#9	Mercyhurst Ice Center • Erie, PA	Amanda Makela	W 3–0	1–0–0
October 4	Providence*	#9	Mercyhurst Ice Center • Erie, PA	Amanda Makela	W 2–0	2–0–0
October 10	at Maine*	#7	Alfond Arena • Orono, ME	Amanda Makela	W 1–0	3–0–0
October 11	at Maine*	#7	Alfond Arena • Orono, ME	Amanda Makela	T 2–2 ^{OT}	3–0–1
October 17	Northeastern*	#8	Mercyhurst Ice Center • Erie, PA	Amanda Makela	L 0–4	3–1–1
October 18	Northeastern*	#8	Mercyhurst Ice Center • Erie, PA	Amanda Makela	W 4–2	4–1–1
October 24	Minnesota State*	#8	Mercyhurst Ice Center • Erie, PA	Amanda Makela	W 5–1	5–1–1
October 25	Minnesota State*	#8	Mercyhurst Ice Center • Erie, PA	Amanda Makela	W 2–1	6–1–1
October 31	Robert Morris	#7	Mercyhurst Ice Center • Erie, PA	Amanda Makela	W 3–0	7–1–1 (1–0–0)
November 1	Robert Morris	#7	Mercyhurst Ice Center • Erie, PA	Amanda Makela	W 4–1	8–1–1 (2–0–0)
November 7	at Syracuse	#7	Tennity Ice Skating Pavilion • Syracuse, NY	Amanda Makela	W 4–1	9–1–1 (3–0–0)
November 8	at Syracuse	#7	Tennity Ice Skating Pavilion • Syracuse, NY	Amanda Makela	L 1–4	9–2–1 (3–1–0)
November 11	at Ohio State*	#8	OSU Ice Rink • Columbus, OH	Amanda Makela	W 3–0	10–2–1
November 21	RIT	#8	Mercyhurst Ice Center • Erie, PA	Amanda Makela	W 4–1	11–2–1 (4–1–0)
November 22	RIT	#8	Mercyhurst Ice Center • Erie, PA	Amanda Makela	W 4–1	12–2–1 (5–1–0)
November 25	Colgate*	#8	Mercyhurst Ice Center • Erie, PA	Amanda Makela	W 3–0	13–2–1
November 26	Colgate*	#8	Mercyhurst Ice Center • Erie, PA	Amanda Makela	W 1–0	14–2–1
December 1	at Cornell*	#7	Lynah Rink • Ithaca, NY	Amanda Makela	T 1–1 ^{OT}	14–2–2
December 5	Lindenwood	#7	Mercyhurst Ice Center • Erie, PA	Amanda Makela	W 6–2	15–2–2 (6–1–0)
December 6	Lindenwood	#7	Mercyhurst Ice Center • Erie, PA	Amanda Makela	W 5–2	16–2–2 (7–1–0)
December 12	at Penn State	#6	Pegula Ice Arena • University Park, PA	Amanda Makela	L 1–2	16–3–2 (7–2–0)
December 13	at Penn State	#6	Pegula Ice Arena • University Park, PA	Amanda Makela	L 3–5	16–4–2 (7–3–0)
January 16, 2015	Syracuse	#9	Mercyhurst Ice Center • Erie, PA	Amanda Makela	T 1–1 ^{OT}	16–4–3 (7–3–1)
January 17	Syracuse	#9	Mercyhurst Ice Center • Erie, PA	Amanda Makela	W 3–2	17–4–3 (8–3–1)
January 23	at St. Lawrence*	#9	Appleton Arena • Canton, NY	Amanda Makela	L 1–6	17–5–3
January 24	at St. Lawrence*	#9	Appleton Arena • Canton, NY	Amanda Makela	L 1–4	17–6–3
January 30	at Robert Morris		RMU Island Sports Center • Neville Township, PA	Amanda Makela	W 2–1 ^{OT}	18–6–3 (9–3–1)
January 31	at Robert Morris		RMU Island Sports Center • Neville Township, PA	Amanda Makela	L 2–3	18–7–3 (9–4–1)
February 6	at RIT		Gene Polisseni Center • Rochester, NY	Julia DiTondo	W 5–1	19–7–3 (10–4–1)
February 6	at RIT		Gene Polisseni Center • Rochester, NY	Julia DiTondo	W 3–0	20–7–3 (11–4–1)
February 6	Penn State		Mercyhurst Ice Center • Erie, PA	Julia DiTondo	W 2–0	21–7–3 (12–4–1)
February 7	Penn State		Mercyhurst Ice Center • Erie, PA	Amanda Makela	W 4–0	22–7–3 (13–4–1)
February 20	at Lindenwood		Lindenwood Ice Arena • Wentzville, MO	Julia DiTondo	L 1–3	22–8–3 (13–5–1)
February 21	at Lindenwood		Lindenwood Ice Arena • Wentzville, MO	Amanda Makela	W 7–1	23–8–3 (14–5–1)
CHA Tournament
March 6	RIT*		Mercyhurst Ice Center • Erie, PA	Amanda Makela	L 1–4	23–9–3
*Non-conference game. ^{#}Rankings from USCHO.com Poll.

== Awards and honors ==
- Molly Byrne, D, 2014-15 All-CHA First Team
- Molly Byrne, 2014-15 CHA Best Defenseman
- Jenna Dingeldein, F,2014-15 All-CHA Second Team
- Emily Janiga, F, 2014-15 All-CHA First Team
- Emily Janiga, 2014-15 CHA Player of the Year
- Emily Janiga, 2014-15 CHA Scoring Trophy
- Emily Janiga, CHA Player of the Month (March 2015)
- Amanda Makela, 2014-15 CHA Goaltender Trophy
- Sarah Robello, F, 2014-15 CHA All- Rookie Team
