= 2014–15 Bemidji State Beavers women's ice hockey season =

- Conference: 5th WCHA
- Home ice: Sanford Center

Rankings
- USCHO.com: 10th
- USA Today/USA Hockey Magazine: 10th

Record
- Overall: 21–17–1
- Home: 9–7–0
- Road: 11–9–1
- Neutral: 1–1–0

Coaches and captains
- Head coach: James Scanlan
- Assistant coaches: Amber Fryklund; Shane Veenker; Andy Kent
- Captain: Kristine Grenier
- Alternate captain(s): Alex Citrowske; Stephanie Anderson

The Bemidji State Beavers women's ice hockey program represented the Bemidji State University during the 2014-15 NCAA Division I women's ice hockey season. The Beavers won 21 games, and were ranked 10th nationally by both major polling organizations. During the WCHA Conference tournament, Bemidji State upset the powerful Minnesota Golden Gophers.

== Offseason ==
- August 1: Alumni Tess Dusik and Jessica Havel signed professional contracts to play for Gothenburg HC in Sweden

=== 2014–15 Beavers ===
No.	Nat.	Player	Class	Pos	Height	DoB	Hometown	Previous team
2		Reilly Fawcett	Freshman	F	5' 4" (1.63 m)		Proctor, Minnesota	Proctor/Hermantown HS
4		Madison Hutchinson	Sophomore	D	5' 8" (1.73 m)		Manitou, Manitoba	Pembina Valley Hawks
5		Alex Citrowske (A)	Senior	F	5' 6" (1.68 m)		Savage, Minnesota	Prior Lake HS
6		Kristen Huber	Junior	F	5' 11" (1.8 m)		Kelowna, British Columbia	Pursuit of Excellence
7		Carley Esse	Sophomore	D	5' 8" (1.73 m)		Cloquet, Minnesota	Cloquet HS
8		Megan Lushanko	Junior	F	5' 3" (1.6 m)		Chisago City, Minnesota	Chisago Lakes HS
9		Kaitlyn Tougas	Junior	F	5' 4" (1.63 m)		Thunder Bay, Ontario	Thunder Bay Queens
11		Whitney Wivoda	Junior	F	5' 8" (1.73 m)		Fairbanks, Alaska	Lathrop HS
14		Lauren Miller	Sophomore	F	5' 7" (1.7 m)		Brockville, Ontario	Nepean Wildcats
15		Ciscely Nelson	Freshman	F	5' 7" (1.7 m)		Roseau, Minnesota	Roseau HS
16		Stephanie Anderson (A)	Junior	F	5' 9" (1.75 m)		North St. Paul, Minnesota	Minnesota
17		Emma Terres	Freshman	D	5' 8" (1.73 m)		New Hope, Minnesota	Armstrong-Cooper HS
18		Rachael Kelly	Senior	F	5' 5" (1.65 m)		Rosemount, Minnesota	Rosemount HS
20		Jenessa Philipczyk	Senior	D/F	5' 7" (1.7 m)		Stillwater, Minnesota	Minnesota Thoroughbreds
22		Alexis Joyce	Freshman	D	5' 4" (1.63 m)		Lakeville, Minnesota	Lakeville North HS
23		Ivana Bilic	Junior	D	5' 7" (1.7 m)		Coquitlam, British Columbia	Warner Hockey Academy
24		Summer Thibodeau	Freshman	F	5' 7" (1.7 m)		Maple Grove, Minnesota	Maple Grove HS
25		Alex Bond	Freshman	D	5' 10" (1.78 m)		Barrie, Ontario	Barrie Jr. Sharks
27		Kayleigh Chapman	Senior	D	5' 8" (1.73 m)		Virden, Manitoba	Warner Hockey Academy
28		Bailey Wright	Sophomore (RS)	F	5' 6" (1.68 m)		Anchorage, Alaska	Minnesota Duluth (WCHA)
29		Brittni Mowat	Sophomore	G	5' 7" (1.7 m)		Glenboro, Manitoba	Pembina Valley Hawks
30		Erin Deters	Freshman	G	5' 7" (1.7 m)		Sartell, Minnesota	Sartell/Sauk Rapids HS
32		Hannah Paulson	Freshman	G	5' 6" (1.68 m)		Osseo, Minnesota	North Metro HS
33		Mackenzie Bruch	Junior	G	5' 6" (1.68 m)		Barrie, Ontario	Stevenson University
56		Hannah Moher	Junior	F	5' 6" (1.68 m)		Milton, Ontario	Mississauga Jr, Chiefs
93		Kristine Grenier (C)	Senior	F	5' 6" (1.68 m)		St. Leon, Manitoba	Mercyhurst

== Schedule ==
Date	Opponent^{#}	Rank^{#}	Site	Decision	Result	Record
Regular Season
September 26	at Robert Morris*		RMU Island Sports Center • Neville Township, PA	Brittni Mowat	W 5–2	1–0–0
September 27	at Robert Morris*		RMU Island Sports Center • Neville Township, PA	Erin Deters	W 3–1	2–0–0
October 4	Rensselaer*		Sanford Center • Bemidji, MN	Erin Deters	W 4–0	3–0–0
October 5	Vermont*		Sanford Center • Bemidji, MN	Brittni Mowat	W 4–0	4–0–0
October 17	at Ohio State		OSU Ice Rink • Columbus, OH	Brittni Mowat	L 1–5	4–1–0 (0–1–0)
October 18	at Ohio State		OSU Ice Rink • Columbus, OH	Erin Deters	L 0–1	4–2–0 (0–2–0)
October 24	#2 Wisconsin		Sanford Center • Bemidji, MN	Brittni Mowat	L 1–2	4–3–0 (0–3–0)
October 25	#2 Wisconsin		Sanford Center • Bemidji, MN	Erin Deters	L 3–4	4–4–0 (0–4–0)
October 31	at #1 Minnesota		Ridder Arena • Minneapolis, MN	Brittni Mowat	T 2–2 ^{OT}	4–4–1 (0–4–1)
November 1	at #1 Minnesota		Ridder Arena • Minneapolis, MN	Brittni Mowat	W 1–0	5–4–1 (1–4–1)
November 14	North Dakota		Sanford Center • Bemidji, MN	Brittni Mowat	W 4–1	6–4–1 (2–4–1)
November 15	North Dakota		Sanford Center • Bemidji, MN	Brittni Mowat	W 2–1	7–4–1 (3–4–1)
November 28	#9 Minnesota Duluth	#10	Sanford Center • Bemidji, MN	Brittni Mowat	W 4–1	8–4–1 (4–4–1)
November 29	#9 Minnesota Duluth	#10	Sanford Center • Bemidji, MN	Brittni Mowat	L 0–2	8–5–1 (4–5–1)
December 5	Minnesota State	#9	Sanford Center • Bemidji, MN	Brittni Mowat	W 7–4	9–5–1 (5–5–1)
December 6	Minnesota State	#9	Sanford Center • Bemidji, MN	Brittni Mowat	W 2–0	10–5–1 (6–5–1)
December 12	at St. Cloud State	#9	Herb Brooks National Hockey Center • St. Cloud, MN	Brittni Mowat	W 4–1	11–5–1 (7–5–1)
December 13	at St. Cloud State	#9	Herb Brooks National Hockey Center • St. Cloud, MN	Brittni Mowat	L 0–3	11–6–1 (7–6–1)
December 19	Ohio State	#9	Sanford Center • Bemidji, MN	Brittni Mowat	L 0–2	11–7–1 (7–7–1)
December 20	Ohio State	#9	Sanford Center • Bemidji, MN	Brittni Mowat	L 1–2	11–8–1 (7–8–1)
January 2, 2015	at Lindenwood*	#9	Lindenwood Ice Arena • Wentzville, MO	Erin Deters	L 0–1	11–9–1
January 3	at Lindenwood*	#9	Lindenwood Ice Arena • Wentzville, MO	Brittni Mowat	W 6–0	12–9–1
January 10	at #7 Minnesota Duluth		AMSOIL Arena • Duluth, MN	Brittni Mowat	W 4–1	13–9–1 (8–8–1)
January 11	at #7 Minnesota Duluth		AMSOIL Arena • Duluth, MN	Brittni Mowat	L 1–2	13–10–1 (8–9–1)
January 16	at #3 Wisconsin		LaBahn Arena • Madison, WI	Brittni Mowat	W 2–1	14–10–1 (9–9–1)
January 17	at #3 Wisconsin		LaBahn Arena • Madison, WI	Erin Deters	L 1–2 ^{OT}	14–11–1 (9–10–1)
January 24	at North Dakota		Ralph Engelstad Arena • Grand Forks, ND	Brittni Mowat	L 1–4	14–12–1 (9–11–1)
January 25	at North Dakota		Ralph Engelstad Arena • Grand Forks, ND	Brittni Mowat	L 1–5	14–13–1 (9–12–1)
February 6	St. Cloud State		Sanford Center • Bemidji, MN	Brittni Mowat	W 3–1	15–13–1 (10–12–1)
February 7	St. Cloud State		Sanford Center • Bemidji, MN	Brittni Mowat	W 1–0	16–13–1 (11–12–1)
February 13	at Minnesota State		All Seasons Arena • Mankato, MN	Brittni Mowat	W 4–0	17–13–1 (12–12–1)
February 14	at Minnesota State		All Seasons Arena • Mankato, MN	Brittni Mowat	W 4–3	18–13–1 (13–12–1)
February 20	#2 Minnesota		Sanford Center • Bemidji, MN	Brittni Mowat	L 2–3	18–14–1 (13–13–1)
February 21	#2 Minnesota		Sanford Center • Bemidji, MN	Brittni Mowat	L 2–4	18–15–1 (13–14–1)
WCHA Tournament
February 27	at #9 Minnesota Duluth		AMSOIL Arena • Duluth, MN (Quarterfinals, Game 1)	Brittni Mowat	W 3–2	19–15–1
February 28	at #9 Minnesota Duluth		AMSOIL Arena • Duluth, MN (Quarterfinals, Game 2)	Brittni Mowat	L 0–1	19–16–1
March 1	at #9 Minnesota Duluth		AMSOIL Arena • Duluth, MN (Quarterfinals, Game 3)	Brittni Mowat	W 2–1 ^{OT}	20–16–1
March 7	vs. #2 Minnesota	#10	Ralph Engelstad Arena • Grand Forks, ND (Semifinal Game)	Brittni Mowat	W 1–0	21–16–1
March 8	vs. #3 Wisconsin	#10	Ralph Engelstad Arena • Grand Forks, ND (WCHA Championship Game)	Brittni Mowat	L 0–4	21–17–1
*Non-conference game. ^{#}Rankings from USCHO.com Poll.

== Awards and honors ==
- Brittni Mowat, G, 2014–2015 Women's CCM Hockey Division I All-American, First Team
- James Scanlan, WCHA Coach of the Year
- Brittni Mowat, G, All-WCHA First Team
- Alexis Joyce, D, All-WCHA Rookie Team
