= 2014–15 Syracuse Orange women's ice hockey season =

- Conference: 2nd College Hockey America
- Home ice: Tennity Ice Skating Pavilion

Record
- Overall: 11-15-10
- Conference: 8-6-6
- Home: 8-4-6
- Road: 2-10-4
- Neutral: 1-1-0

Coaches and captains
- Head coach: Paul Flanagan 7th season
- Assistant coaches: Alison Domenico; Brendon Knight
- Captain(s): Akane Hosoyamada, Julia Knerr
- Alternate captain(s): Nicole Ferrara, Nicole Renault

The Syracuse Orange women represented Syracuse University in CHA women's ice hockey during the 2014-15 NCAA Division I women's ice hockey season. The Orange finished conference play in second place, and advanced to the CHA Tournament Final, before losing to RIT 2-1 in double overtime.

== Offseason ==
- July 7: Thirteen players were named to the CHA All-Academic Team.

=== Recruiting ===
Player	Position	Nationality	Notes
Megan Quinn	Defense	Canada	Played with Team Canada U18
Alysha Burriss	Forward	Canada	Competed with Durham West Jr. Lightning with Megan Quinn
Abby Miller	Goaltender	United States	Played for Benilde-St. Margarets's HS
Stephanie Grossi	Forward	Canada	Played for Shaftesbury Prep
Emily Costales	Forward	Canada	Played for Pacific Steelers

== Standings ==
2014–15 College Hockey America standings
	Conference record							Overall record					
	GP	W	L	T	PTS	GF	GA	GP	W	L	T	GF	GA
Mercyhurst^{†}	20	14	5	1	29	66	31	35	23	9	3	96	56
Syracuse	20	8	6	6	22	45	39	36	11	15	10	75	97
Penn State	20	9	9	2	20	42	46	37	17	16	4	72	88
Robert Morris	20	8	8	4	20	45	43	35	11	19	5	68	91
Lindenwood	20	7	11	2	16	40	59	33	10	21	2	57	102
RIT*	20	5	12	3	13	32	52	39	15	19	5	71	87
Championship: RIT † indicates conference regular season champion; * indicates conference tournament champion Final rankings: USCHO.com Poll

== Roster ==
=== 2014–15 Orange ===
No.	Nat.	Player	Class	Pos	Height	DoB	Hometown	Previous team
1		Amanda Carridi	Senior	G			North Adams, Massachusetts	North Adams HS
2		Nicole Renault (A)	Junior	D			Plymouth, Michigan	Little Caesar's U19
3		Julie Knerr (C)	Senior	F			Dollard-des-Ormeaux, Quebec	John Abbot College
4		Akane Hosoyamada (C)	Senior (RS)	D			Banff, Alberta	Warner Hockey School
6		Danielle Leslie	Junior	D			Winnipeg, Manitoba	Team Manitoba U18
7		Jessica Sibley	Sophomore	F			Luseland, Saskatchewan	Team Saskatchewan U18
8		Stephanie Grossi	Freshman	F			Winnipeg, Manitoba	Team Manitoba U18
9		Allie Lacombe	Senior	F			Eden Prairie, Minnesota	Eden Prairie HS
10		Morgan Blank	Sophomore	F			Fort Mitchell, Kentucky	Pittsburgh Penguins Elite
11		Emily Costales	Freshman	F			Vancouver, British Columbia	Team British Columbia U18
12		Nicole Ferrera (A)	Senior	F			Winthrop, Massachusetts	Assabet Valley U19
14		Melissa Piacentini	Junior	F			South Weymouth, Massachusetts	Assabet Valley U19
16		Kaillie Goodnough	Senior	D			Mannsville, New York	National Sports Academy
17		Melissa Martyniuk	Sophomore	D			Winnipeg, Manitoba	Team Manitoba U18
19		Dakota Derrer	Freshman	D			Mancelona, Michigan	Traverse City-St. Francis
20		Alysha Burriss	Freshman	F			Napanee, Ontario	Team Ontario Blue U18
21		Kaylee Druk	Freshman	F			St. Louis Park, Minnesota	Benilde-St. Margaret's
22		Laurence Porlier	Sophomore	F			Maria, Quebec	Brewster Academy
23		Megan Quinn	Freshman	D			Belleville, Ontario	Team Ontario Red U18
24		Eleanor Haines	Sophomore	F			Huntington, New York	Canterbury School
25		Elizabeth Scala	Sophomore	F			Rumford, Rhode Island	National Sports Academy
27		Heather Schwartz	Sophomore	F			Naugatuck, Connecticut	Boston Shamrocks
29		Abbey Miller	Freshman	G			Anoka, Minnesota	Benilde-St. Margaret's
33		Jenn Gilligan	Junior	G			Maple Ridge, British Columbia	New Hampshire (NCAA)

== Schedule ==
Date	Opponent^{#}	Rank^{#}	Site	Decision	Result	Record
Regular Season
October 2	Colgate*		Tennity Ice Skating Pavilion • Syracuse, NY	Jenn Gilligan	W 2–1	1–0–0
October 4	at #3 Boston College*		Kelley Rink • Chestnut Hill, MA	Jenn Gilligan	L 2–10	1–1–0
October 10	Northeastern*		Tennity Ice Skating Pavilion • Syracuse, NY	Jenn Gilligan	T 1–1 ^{OT}	1–1–1
October 11	New Hampshire*		Tennity Ice Skating Pavilion • Syracuse, NY	Jenn Gilligan	T 2–2 ^{OT}	1–1–2
October 18	Providence*		Tennity Ice Skating Pavilion • Syracuse, NY	Abbey Miller	T 3–3 ^{OT}	1–1–3
October 19	Connecticut*		Tennity Ice Skating Pavilion • Syracuse, NY	Jenn Gilligan	T 3–3 ^{OT}	1–1–4
October 24	at #10 Clarkson*		Cheel Arena • Potsdam, NY	Jenn Gilligan	L 0–9	1–2–4
October 25	#10 Clarkson*		Tennity Ice Skating Pavilion • Syracuse, NY	Jenn Gilligan	L 1–4	1–3–4
October 31	Penn State		Tennity Ice Skating Pavilion • Syracuse, NY	Jenn Gilligan	W 3–1	2–3–4 (1–0–0)
November 1	Penn State		Tennity Ice Skating Pavilion • Syracuse, NY	Jenn Gilligan	T 2–2 ^{OT}	2–3–5 (1–0–1)
November 7	#8 Mercyhurst		Tennity Ice Skating Pavilion • Syracuse, NY	Jenn Gilligan	L 1–5	2–4–5 (1–1–1)
November 8	#8 Mercyhurst		Tennity Ice Skating Pavilion • Syracuse, NY	Jenn Gilligan	W 4–1	3–4–5 (2–1–1)
November 14	Vermont*		Tennity Ice Skating Pavilion • Syracuse, NY	Jenn Gilligan	L 5–6 ^{OT}	3–5–5
November 15	Vermont*		Tennity Ice Skating Pavilion • Syracuse, NY	Abbey Miller	L 4–5	3–6–5
November 21	at Robert Morris		RMU Island Sports Center • Neville Township, PA	Jenn Gilligan	T 2–2 ^{OT}	3–6–6 (2–1–2)
November 22	at Robert Morris		RMU Island Sports Center • Neville Township, PA	Jenn Gilligan	T 1–1 ^{OT}	3–6–7 (2–1–3)
November 28	at Lindenwood		Lindenwood Ice Arena • Wentzville, MO	Jenn Gilligan	W 1–0	4–6–7 (3–1–3)
November 29	at Lindenwood		Lindenwood Ice Arena • Wentzville, MO	Jenn Gilligan	L 1–2	4–7–7 (3–2–3)
December 2	at Cornell*		Lynah Rink • Ithaca, NY	Jenn Gilligan	L 2–6	4–8–7
December 6	RIT		Tennity Ice Skating Pavilion • Syracuse, NY	Jenn Gilligan	W 4–2	5–8–7 (4–2–3)
January 6, 2015	at Colgate*		Starr Rink • Hamilton, NY	Jenn Gilligan	L 0–2	5–9–7
January 10	at North Dakota*		Ralph Engelstad Arena • Grand Forks, ND	Jenn Gilligan	L 1–4	5–10–7
January 11	at North Dakota*		Ralph Engelstad Arena • Grand Forks, ND	Jenn Gilligan	W 2–1	6–10–7
January 16	at #9 Mercyhurst		Mercyhurst Ice Center • Erie, PA	Jenn Gilligan	T 1–1 ^{OT}	6–10–8 (4–2–4)
January 17	at #9 Mercyhurst		Mercyhurst Ice Center • Erie, PA	Jenn Gilligan	L 2–3	6–11–8 (4–3–4)
January 23	at RIT		Gene Polisseni Center • Rochester, NY	Jenn Gilligan	L 3–4 ^{OT}	6–12–8 (4–4–4)
January 30	at Penn State		Pegula Ice Arena • University Park, PA	Jenn Gilligan	T 2–2 ^{OT}	6–12–9 (4–4–5)
January 31	at Penn State		Pegula Ice Arena • University Park, PA	Jenn Gilligan	L 2–4	6–13–9 (4–5–5)
February 6	Robert Morris		Tennity Ice Skating Pavilion • Syracuse, NY	Jenn Gilligan	W 2–1	7–13–9 (5–5–5)
February 7	Robert Morris		Tennity Ice Skating Pavilion • Syracuse, NY	Jenn Gilligan	W 3–1	8–13–9 (6–5–5)
February 13	Lindenwood		Tennity Ice Skating Pavilion • Syracuse, NY	Jenn Gilligan	T 4–4 ^{OT}	8–13–10 (6–5–6)
February 14	Lindenwood		Tennity Ice Skating Pavilion • Syracuse, NY	Jenn Gilligan	W 3–1	9–13–10 (7–5–6)
February 20	RIT		Tennity Ice Skating Pavilion • Syracuse, NY	Jenn Gilligan	W 4–1	10–13–10 (8–5–6)
February 21	at RIT		Gene Polisseni Center • Rochester, NY	Amanda Cariddi	L 0–1	10–14–10 (8–6–6)
CHA Tournament
March 6	vs. Penn State*		Mercyhurst Ice Center • Erie, PA (Semifinal Game)	Jenn Gilligan	W 2–0	11–14–10
March 7	vs. RIT*		Mercyhurst Ice Center • Erie, PA (Championship Game)	Jenn Gilligan	L 1–2 ^{2OT}	11–15–10
*Non-conference game. ^{#}Rankings from USCHO.com Poll.

== Awards and honors ==
- Stephanie Grossi, 2014-15 CHA Rookie of the Year
- Paul Flanagan, 2014-15 CHA Coach of the Year
- Nicole Renault, 2014-15 All-CHA First Team
- Melissa Piacentini, 2014-15 All-CHA First Team
- Jennifer Gilligan, 2014-15 All-CHA Second Team
- Akane Hosoyamada, 2014-15 All-CHA Second Team
- Stephanie Grossi, 2014-15 All-CHA Rookie Team
- Alysha Burriss, 2014-15 All-CHA Rookie Team
