= 2014–15 St. Cloud State Huskies women's ice hockey season =

- Conference: 7th WCHA
- Home ice: Herb Brooks National Hockey Center

Record
- Overall: 8–28–1
- Home: 3–12–1
- Road: 5–13–0
- Neutral: 0–3–0

Coaches and captains
- Head coach: Eric Rud
- Assistant coaches: Steve MacDonald; Jinelle Siergiej
- Captain(s): Abby Ness; Audrey Hanmer
- Alternate captain(s): Julie Friend; Molly Illikainen

The St. Cloud State Huskies women's ice hockey program represented St. Cloud State University during the 2014-15 NCAA Division I women's ice hockey season. Despite a disappointing season, the team managed to upset nationally ranked Wisconsin on February 20, 2015, on the strength of 52 saves by goaltender Julie Friend.

== Offseason ==
- May 29: St. Cloud State University hired Eric Rud as the new Head Coach of the Huskies.

=== Recruiting ===
Player	Position	Nationality	Notes
Mac Johnson	Forward	United States	From Monticello, MN
Alyssa Erickson	Forward	Canada	British Columbia native
Lexi Slattery	Defender	United States	1 of 2 transfers from Providence College
Brittney Anderson	Defender	United States	Comes to SCSU from Hudson, Wisconsin
Molly Illikainen	Forward	United States	2nd of 2 transfers from Providence College

=== 2014–15 Huskies ===
No.	Nat.	Player	Class	Pos	Height	DoB	Hometown	Previous team
1		Julie Friend (A)	Senior	G	5' 8" (1.73 m)		Minnetonka, Minnesota	Minnetonka HS
3		Audrey Hanmer (C)	Senior	D	5' 7" (1.7 m)		Wyoming, Minnesota	Forest Lake HS
5		Hannah Brodt	Junior	F	5' 4" (1.63 m)		Roseville, Minnesota	Roseville HS
6		Amanda Arbogast	Senior	F	5' 7" (1.7 m)		Virginia, Minnesota	Eveleth-Gilbert Area HS
7		Brittney Anderson	Freshman	D	5' 6" (1.68 m)		Hudson, Wisconsin
9		Lauren Hespenheide	Sophomore	F	5' 0" (1.52 m)		Shakopee, Minnesota	Shakopee Senior HS
10		Abby Ness (C)	Senior	F	5' 7" (1.7 m)		Roseau, Minnesota	Roseau HS
11		Caroline Markstrom	Sophomore	D	5' 8" (1.73 m)		Kovland, Sweden	Sundsvalls Gymnasium
12		Molly Illikainen (A)	Junior	F	5' 9" (1.75 m)		Grand Rapids, Minnesota	Providence
13		Mackenzie Johnson	Freshman	F	5' 8" (1.73 m)		Monticello, Minnesota
15		Lexi Slattery	Junior	D			Hugo, Minnesota	Providence
16		Vanessa Spataro	Junior	F	5' 5" (1.65 m)		Stouffville, Ontario	Toronto Jr. Aeros
17		Jenna Redford	Sophomore (RS)	D	5' 6" (1.68 m)		Soldotna, Alaska	Boston Shamrocks
18		Kelsey Saelens	Sophomore	F	5' 7" (1.7 m)		Winnipeg, Manitoba	Shaftesbury Prep
19		Paige Pena	Sophomore	F	5' 7" (1.7 m)		Maple Ridge, British Columbia	Okanagan Hockey Academy
20		Emma Turbyville	Freshman	D	5' 10" (1.78 m)		Chicago, Illinois
21		Christa Moody	Sophomore	D	5' 9" (1.75 m)		Battle Creek, Michigan	Honeybaked
22		Kalli Funk	Senior	F	5' 5" (1.65 m)		Roseville, Minnesota	Niagara
24		Alex Makaric	Sophomore	D	5' 11" (1.8 m)		Windsor, Ontario	Cambridge Rivulettes
27		Alyssa Erickson	Freshman	F	5' 8" (1.73 m)		Mission, British Columbia
30		Jacqueline Audet	Freshman (RS)	G	5' 3" (1.6 m)		Campbell, California	Anaheim Lady Ducks
35		Katie Fitzgerald	Junior	G	5' 11" (1.8 m)		Des Plaines, Illinois	Chicago Mission AAA

== Schedule ==
Date	Opponent^{#}	Rank^{#}	Site	Decision	Result	Record
Regular Season
October 3	vs. #6 Boston University*		Ridder Arena • Minneapolis, MN	Julie Friend	L 2–5	0–1–0
October 4	vs. Penn State*		Ridder Arena • Minneapolis, MN	Katie Fitzgerald	L 2–3	0–2–0
October 10	Lindenwood*		Herb Brooks National Hockey Center • St. Cloud, MN	Julie Friend	W 2–0	1–2–0
October 11	Lindenwood*		Herb Brooks National Hockey Center • St. Cloud, MN	Julie Friend	L 3–5	1–3–0
October 17	at Minnesota State		All Seasons Arena • Mankato, MN	Julie Friend	W 3–5	2–3–0 (1–0–0)
October 18	Minnesota State		Herb Brooks National Hockey Center • St. Cloud, MN	Katie Fitzgerald	T 3–5 ^{OT}	2–3–1 (1–0–1)
October 31	at Ohio State		OSU Ice Rink • Columbus, OH	Julie Friend	W 4–2	3–3–1 (2–0–1)
November 1	at Ohio State		OSU Ice Rink • Columbus, OH	Katie Fitzgerald	L 0–3	3–4–1 (2–1–1)
November 7	at Rensselaer*		Houston Field House • Troy, NY	Julie Friend	W 3–2	4–4–1
November 8	at Rensselaer*		Houston Field House • Troy, NY	Katie Fitzgerald	W 3–0	5–4–1
November 14	#9 Minnesota Duluth		Herb Brooks National Hockey Center • St. Cloud, MN	Julie Friend	L 1–6	5–5–1 (2–2–1)
November 15	#9 Minnesota Duluth		Herb Brooks National Hockey Center • St. Cloud, MN	Katie Fitzgerald	L 0–1	5–6–1 (2–3–1)
November 21	#3 Wisconsin		Herb Brooks National Hockey Center • St. Cloud, MN	Julie Friend	L 0–4	5–7–1 (2–4–1)
November 22	#3 Wisconsin		Herb Brooks National Hockey Center • St. Cloud, MN	Katie Fitzgerald	L 0–3	5–8–1 (2–5–1)
November 24	vs. #2 Minnesota*		Braemar Ice Rink • Edina, MN (Hall of Fame Classic)	Julie Friend	L 0–5	5–9–1
November 29	at North Dakota		Ralph Engelstad Arena • Grand Forks, ND	Julie Friend	L 1–6	5–10–1 (2–6–1)
November 30	at North Dakota		Ralph Engelstad Arena • Grand Forks, ND	Katie Fitzgerald	L 1–3	5–11–1 (2–7–1)
December 5	at #2 Minnesota		Ridder Arena • Minneapolis, MN	Julie Friend	L 0–12	5–12–1 (2–8–1)
December 6	at #2 Minnesota		Ridder Arena • Minneapolis, MN	Katie Fitzgerald	L 0–7	5–13–1 (2–9–1)
December 12	#9 Bemidji State		Herb Brooks National Hockey Center • St. Cloud, MN	Julie Friend	L 1–4	5–14–1 (2–10–1)
December 13	#9 Bemidji State		Herb Brooks National Hockey Center • St. Cloud, MN	Katie Fitzgerald	W 3–0	6–14–1 (3–10–1)
January 9, 2015	Ohio State		Herb Brooks National Hockey Center • St. Cloud, MN	Julie Friend	L 1–3	6–15–1 (3–11–1)
January 10	Ohio State		Herb Brooks National Hockey Center • St. Cloud, MN	Katie Fitzgerald	L 0–4	6–16–1 (3–12–1)
January 17	at #7 Minnesota Duluth		AMSOIL Arena • Duluth, MN	Julie Friend	L 0–2	6–17–1 (3–13–1)
January 18	at #7 Minnesota Duluth		AMSOIL Arena • Duluth, MN	Julie Friend	L 2–3	6–18–1 (3–14–1)
January 23	#2 Minnesota		Herb Brooks National Hockey Center • St. Cloud, MN	Julie Friend	L 0–4	6–19–1 (3–15–1)
January 24	#2 Minnesota		Herb Brooks National Hockey Center • St. Cloud, MN	Katie Fitzgerald	L 1–7	6–20–1 (3–16–1)
February 2	at Minnesota State		All Seasons Arena • Mankato, MN	Julie Friend	L 1–5	6–21–1 (3–17–1)
February 6	at Bemidji State		Sanford Center • Bemidji, MN	Katie Fitzgerald	L 1–3	6–22–1 (3–18–1)
February 7	at Bemidji State		Sanford Center • Bemidji, MN	Julie Friend	L 0–1	6–23–1 (3–19–1)
February 13	#9 North Dakota		Herb Brooks National Hockey Center • St. Cloud, MN	Katie Fitzgerald	L 0–4	6–24–1 (3–20–1)
February 14	#9 North Dakota		Herb Brooks National Hockey Center • St. Cloud, MN	Julie Friend	L 0–2	6–25–1 (3–21–1)
February 16	Minnesota State		Herb Brooks National Hockey Center • St. Cloud, MN	Katie Fitzgerald	W 3–1	7–25–1 (4–21–1)
February 20	at #3 Wisconsin		LaBahn Arena • Madison, WI	Julie Friend	W 2–1	8–25–1 (5–21–1)
February 22	at #3 Wisconsin		LaBahn Arena • Madison, WI	Katie Fitzgerald	L 0–5	8–26–1 (5–22–1)
WCHA Tournament
February 27	at #3 Wisconsin*		LaBahn Arena • Madison, WI (Quarterfinals, Game 1)	Julie Friend	L 1–5	8–27–1
February 28	at #3 Wisconsin*		LaBahn Arena • Madison, WI (Quarterfinals, Game 2)	Julie Friend	L 1–4	8–28–1
*Non-conference game. ^{#}Rankings from USCHO.com Poll.
