= 2014–15 Northeastern Huskies women's ice hockey season =

- Conference: 3rd WHEA
- Home ice: Matthews Arena; Boston, MA

Record
- Overall: 14–17–5
- Home: 7–8–1
- Road: 7–6–4
- Neutral: 0–3–0

Coaches and captains
- Head coach: Dave Flint
- Assistant coaches: Jeff Pellegrini; Nick Carpenito
- Captain: Kendall Coyne
- Alternate captain: Chloe Desjardins

The Northeastern Huskies represented Northeastern University in the Women's Hockey East Association during the 2014–15 NCAA Division I women's ice hockey season. The Huskies advanced as far as the WHEA Semifinal game before falling to nationally ranked Boston University.

== Offseason ==
- June 25: Kelly Wallace earned the nod as the Hockey East nominee for the 2014 NCAA Woman of the Year award. Leading the Huskies in 2013-14 with 19 goals and 32 points, she was the runner-up for the Hockey East Player of the Year.
- July 21: Former Huskies goaltender Katy Augustyn was named to the United States roster competing at the IRB Women's Rugby World Cup in France. She competed with the Huskies from 2002–06, accumulating three shutouts.
- August 5: Three members of the Huskies roster, Kendall Coyne, Paige Savage and Heather Mottau, earned invitations to the 2014 USA Hockey Women's National Festival.

=== Recruiting ===
Player	Position	Nationality	Notes
Taytum Clairmont	Forward	Canada	Played for Toronto Aeros (PWHL)
Taylor Crosby	Goaltender	Canada	Competed at Shattuck-St. Mary's; Younger sister of Sidney Crosby
Denisa Křížová	Forward	Czech Republic	Attended National Sports Academy
Ainsley MacMillan	Defense	Canada	Competed with Canada U-18 program Competed with Mississauga Chiefs (PWHL)
Lauren Kelly	Forward	United States	Attended the Winchendon School
Halle Silva	Forward	United States	Attended the Tabor Academy
Shelby Herrington	Forward	United States	Competed at Bishop Brady
McKenna Brand	Forward	United States	Graduate of the North American Hockey Academy
Christina Zalewski	Defense	United States	Graduated from Williston Northampton School

== Roster ==
=== 2014–15 Huskies ===
No.	Nat.	Player	Class	Pos	Height	DoB	Hometown	Previous team
2		Lauren Kelly	Freshman	D	5' 6" (1.68 m)		Watertown, Massachusetts
5		Halle Silva	Freshman	F	5' 0" (1.52 m)		Acushnet, Massachusetts	Tabor Academy
6		Shelby Harrington	Freshman	D	6' 1" (1.85 m)		Bow, New Hampshire	Bishop Brady
7		McKenna Brand	Freshman	F	5' 6" (1.68 m)		Nevis, Minnesota	North American Hockey Academy
8		Chelsiea Goll	Senior	F	5' 3" (1.6 m)		Winthrop, Massachusetts	Brewster Academy
9		Bella Sinsigalli	Sophomore	D	5' 7" (1.7 m)		Redding, Connecticut	Berkshire School
10		Colleen Murphy	Senior	D	5' 4" (1.63 m)		Cary, North Carolina	North American Hockey Academy
11		Christina Zalewski	Freshman	F	5' 4" (1.63 m)		Canonsburg, Pennsylvania	Williston Nothampton
13		Taytum Clairmont	Freshman	F	5' 4" (1.63 m)		Waterloo, Ontario	Toronto Aeros
14		Hayley Scamurra	Sophomore	F	5' 8" (1.73 m)		Williamsville, New York	Oakville Jr. Hornets
15		Jordan Krause	Junior	D	5' 9" (1.75 m)		Kelowna, British Columbia	Minnesota Duluth (WCHA)
16		Ann Doherty	Junior	D	5' 4" (1.63 m)		Park Ridge, Illinois	Assabet Valley
19		Mellissa Hagany	Sophomore	F	5' 4" (1.63 m)		Franklin, Massachusetts	Loomis Chaffee
23		Hayley Masters	Sophomore	F	5' 8" (1.73 m)		Shanty Bay, Ontario	Mississauga Jr. Chiefs
24		Chelsey Goldberg	Senior	F	5' 6" (1.68 m)		Agoura Hills, California	North American Hockey Academy
26		Heather Mottau	Sophomore	D	5' 6" (1.68 m)		Milton, Massachusetts	Shattuck-St. Mary's
28		Paige Savage	Junior	F	5' 8" (1.73 m)		Johns Creek, Georgia	North American Hockey Academy
29		Chloe Desjardins (A)	Senior	G	5' 8" (1.73 m)		Beauce, Quebec	Brewster Academy
30		Taylor Crosby	Freshman	G	5' 8" (1.73 m)		Cole Harbour, Nova Scotia	Shattuck-St. Mary's
41		Denisa Křížová	Freshman	F	5' 5" (1.65 m)		Horni Cerekev, Czech Republic	Czech National Team
42		Sarah Foss	Sophomore	G	5' 4" (1.63 m)		North Reading, Massachusetts	National Sports Academy
55		Tori Hickel	Junior	D	5' 4" (1.63 m)		Anchorage, Alaska	North American Hockey Academy
66		Ainsley MacMillan		D	5' 6" (1.68 m)		Ilderton, Ontario	Mississauga Jr. Chiefs
77		Kendall Coyne (C)	Junior	F	5' 4" (1.63 m)		Palos Heights, IL	Berkshire Academy
92		Lucie Povova	Junior	F	5' 7" (1.7 m)		Cizkovice, Czech Republic	Wyoming Seminary

== Schedule ==
Date	Opponent^{#}	Rank^{#}	Site	Decision	Result	Record
Regular Season
October 10	at Syracuse*		Tennity Ice Skating Pavilion • Syracuse, NY	Chloe Desjardins	T 1–1 ^{OT}	0–0–1
October 11	at RIT*		Gene Polisseni Center • Rochester, NY	Chloe Desjardins	T 2–2 ^{OT}	0–0–2
October 17	at #8 Mercyhurst*		Mercyhurst Ice Center • Erie, PA	Chloe Desjardins	W 4–0	1–0–2
October 18	at #8 Mercyhurst*		Mercyhurst Ice Center • Erie, PA	Chloe Desjardins	L 2–4	1–1–2
October 24	at Robert Morris*		RMU Island Sports Center • Neville Township, PA	Chloe Desjardins	L 2–3	1–2–2
October 25	at Robert Morris*		RMU Island Sports Center • Neville Township, PA	Chloe Desjardins	T 2–2 ^{OT}	1–2–3
October 28	at #6 Boston University		Walter Brown Arena • Boston, MA	Chloe Desjardins	L 2–3	1–3–3 (0–1–0)
October 30	at New Hampshire		Whittemore Center • Durham, NH	Chloe Desjardins	W 2–0	2–3–3 (1–1–0)
November 1	Maine		Matthews Arena • Boston, MA	Chloe Desjardins	L 0–1	2–4–3 (1–2–0)
November 8	#1 Boston College		Matthews Arena • Boston, MA	Chloe Desjardins	L 1–6	2–5–3 (1–3–0)
November 11	at #6 Boston University		Walter Brown Arena • Boston, MA	Chloe Desjardins	W 6–3	3–5–3 (2–3–0)
November 15	at Providence		Schneider Arena • Providence, RI	Chloe Desjardins	L 1–4	3–6–3 (2–4–0)
November 16	Providence		Matthews Arena • Boston, MA	Sarah Foss	W 6–2	4–6–3 (3–4–0)
November 22	Vermont		Matthews Arena • Boston, MA	Chloe Desjardins	W 7–3	5–6–3 (4–4–0)
November 23	Vermont		Matthews Arena • Boston, MA	Chloe Desjardins	W 5–1	6–6–3 (5–4–0)
November 29	#7 Harvard*		Matthews Arena • Boston, MA	Chloe Desjardins	L 3–4	6–7–3
December 2	Union*		Matthews Arena • Boston, MA	Chloe Desjardins	L 0–1	6–8–3
December 31	Dartmouth*		Matthews Arena • Boston, MA	Chloe Desjardins	L 1–5	6–9–3
January 3, 2015	Connecticut		Matthews Arena • Boston, MA	Sarah Foss	T 3–3 ^{OT}	6–9–4 (5–4–1)
January 10	#1 Boston College		Matthews Arena • Boston, MA	Sarah Foss	L 3–7	6–10–4 (5–5–1)
January 11	at #1 Boston College		Kelley Rink • Chestnut Hill, MA	Chloe Desjardins	L 1–9	6–11–4 (5–6–1)
January 18	#6 Boston University		Mattews Arena • Boston, MA	Chloe Desjardins	L 3–4	6–12–4 (5–7–1)
January 24	at Maine		Alfond Arena • Orono, ME	Chloe Desjardins	W 5–2	7–12–4 (6–7–1)
January 25	at Maine		Alfond Arena • Orono, ME	Chloe Desjardins	L 2–4	7–13–4 (6–8–1)
January 30	at Vermont		Gutterson Fieldhouse • Burlington, VT	Chloe Desjardins	W 4–3	8–13–4 (7–8–1)
February 3	vs. #1 Boston College*		Bright-Landry Hockey Center • Allston, MA (Beanpot Preliminary Round)	Chloe Desjardins	L 1–3	8–14–4
February 6	Providence		Matthews Arena • Boston, MA	Chloe Desjardins	W 2–1 ^{OT}	9–14–4
February 10	vs. #7 Boston University*		Bright-Landry Hockey Center • Allston, MA (Beanpot Consolation)	Sarah Foss	L 1–3	9–15–4
February 14	at Connecticut		Freitas Ice Forum • Storrs, CT	Chloe Desjardins	W 4–3	10–15–4 (9–8–1)
February 15	at Connecticut		Freitas Ice Forum • Storrs, CT	Chloe Desjardins	T 2–2 ^{OT}	10–15–5 (9–8–2)
February 21	at New Hampshire		Whittemore Center • Durham, NH	Chloe Desjardins	W 5–1	11–15–5 (10–8–2)
February 22	New Hampshire		Matthews Arena • Boston, MA	Chloe Desjardins	W 5–3	12–15–5 (11–8–2)
WHEA Tournament
February 27	New Hampshire*		Matthews Arena • Boston, MA (Quarterfinal Round, Game 1)	Chloe Desjardins	L 1–2	12–16–5
February 28	New Hampshire*		Matthews Arena • Boston, MA (Quarterfinal Round, Game 2)	Chloe Desjardins	W 3–2	13–16–5
March 1	New Hampshire*		Matthews Arena • Boston, MA (Quarterfinal Round, Game 3)	Chloe Desjardins	W 4–3	14–16–5
March 7	vs. #5 Boston University*		Hyannis Youth and Community Center • Hyannis, MA (Semifinal Game)	Chloe Desjardins	L 1–6	14–17–5
*Non-conference game. ^{#}Rankings from USCHO.com Poll.

== Awards and honors ==
- Kendall Coyne led the WHEA in goals scored (21) and placed second in points (39).
- Kendall Coyne was named a first team WHEA All-Star
- Denisa Křížová was named to the Pro Ambitions All-Rookie team.
