= 2014–15 Minnesota Duluth Bulldogs women's ice hockey season =

- Conference: 4th WCHA
- Home ice: Amsoil Arena

Record
- Overall: 20–12–5
- Home: 12–7–2
- Road: 8–5–3

Coaches and captains
- Head coach: Shannon Miller
- Assistant coaches: Laura Schuler; Gina Kingsbury
- Captain(s): Emma Stauber; Zoe Hickel

The Minnesota Duluth Bulldogs represented the University of Minnesota Duluth in WCHA women's ice hockey during the 2014–15 NCAA Division I women's ice hockey season. The Bulldogs were not able to win the NCAA tournament for the sixth time in school history. Of note, it represented the final season in which Shannon Miller served as head coach.

== Offseason ==
- July 10: The UMD Bulldogs announced that two-time Winter Games gold medalist Gina Kingsbury shall join Shannon Miller’s coaching staff. Previously, Kingsbury served on the coaching staff at Okanagan Hockey Academy.

=== Recruiting ===
Player	Position	Nationality	Notes
Lynn Astrup	Defense	United States	Attended Warroad (MN) High School
Catherine Daoust	Defense	Canada	Played with Canadian U18 team
Jessica Healey	Defense	Canada	Played with Canadian U18 team
Alexia Klaas	Forward	United States	Hails from Duluth, Minnesota
Maria Lindh	Forward	Sweden	Member of Swedish national team
Michelle Loewenhielm	Forward	Sweden	Member of Swedish national team
Evelina Suonpaa	Forward	Finland	Member of Finnish national team

=== 2014–15 Bulldogs ===
No.	Nat.	Player	Class	Pos	Height	DoB	Hometown	Previous team
1		Kayla Black	Junior	G	5' 8" (1.73 m)		Blyth, Ontario	Team Canada U-18
5		Sidney Morin	Sophomore	D	5' 5" (1.65 m)		Minnetonka, Minnesota	Team USA U-18
7		Emma Stauber (C)	Senior	D	5' 7" (1.7 m)		Duluth, Minnesota	PHM Mirage
12		Catherine Daoust	Freshman	D	5' 5" (1.65 m)		L'Île-Bizard, Quebec	Team Canada U-18
13		Ashleigh Brykaliuk	Sophomore	F	5' 8" (1.73 m)		Brandon, Manitoba	Team Canada U-18
16		Alexia Klaas	Freshman	F	5' 2" (1.57 m)		Duluth, Minnesota	Northern Stars
17		Katherine McGovern	Sophomore	F	5' 4" (1.63 m)		Scottsdale, Arizona	Dallas Stars U-19
19		Jenna McParland	Senior	F	5' 9" (1.75 m)		Schreiber, Ontario	Toronto Jr. Aeros
21		Lara Stalder	Sophomore	F	5' 6" (1.68 m)		Lucerne, Switzerland	Swiss National Team
24		Michela Cava	Junior	F	5' 4" (1.63 m)		Thunder Bay, Ontario	Connecticut
28		Demi Crossman	Sophomore	F	5' 7" (1.7 m)		Livonia, Michigan	Team USA U-18
29		Lynn Astrup	Freshman	D	5' 7" (1.7 m)		Warroad, Minnesota	Warroad HS
34		Karissa Grapp	Junior	G	5' 5" (1.65 m)		Essexville, Michigan	Ohio Flames
43		Meghan Huertas	Senior	F	5' 6" (1.68 m)		Boynton Beach, Florida	Vermont
44		Zoe Hickel (C)	Senior	F	5' 6" (1.68 m)		Anchorage, Alaska	North American Hockey Academy
47		Jessica Healey	Freshman	D	5' 3" (1.6 m)		Edmonton, Alberta	Team Canada U-18
54		Evelina Suonpaa	Freshman	G	5' 8" (1.73 m)		Kiukainen, Finland	Team Finland
66		Maria Lindh	Freshman	F	5' 9" (1.75 m)		Stockholm, Sweden	Team Sweden
67		Michelle Lowenhielm	Freshman	F	5' 8" (1.73 m)		Sollentuna, Sweden	Swedish National Team
80		Tea Villila	Senior	D	5' 5" (1.65 m)		Hyvinkaa, Finland	Team Finland
88		Brigette Lacquette	Senior	D	5' 6" (1.68 m)		Mallard, Manitoba	University of Manitoba
92		Brienna Gillanders	Senior	F	5' 9" (1.75 m)		Kyle, Saskatchewan	Team Saskatchewan
95		Linnea Hedin	Freshman	D	5' 3" (1.6 m)		Huddinge, Sweden	Team Sweden
98		Kateřina Mrázová	Sophomore	F	5' 5" (1.65 m)		Prague, Czech Republic	Boston Blades

== Schedule ==
Date	Opponent^{#}	Rank^{#}	Site	Decision	Result	Record
Regular Season
September 26	at Connecticut*	#10	Freitas Ice Forum • Storrs, CT	Kayla Black	T 4–4 ^{OT}	0–0–1
September 27	at Connecticut*	#10	Freitas Ice Forum • Storrs, CT	Kayla Black	W 3–0	1–0–1
October 3	#2 Wisconsin	#10	Amsoil Arena • Duluth, MN	Kayla Black	L 1–4	1–1–1 (0–1–0)
October 4	#2 Wisconsin	#10	Amsoil Arena • Duluth, MN	Kayla Black	L 2–6	1–2–1 (0–2–0)
October 10	#1 Minnesota		Amsoil Arena • Duluth, MN	Kayla Black	L 0–3	1–3–1 (0–3–0)
October 11	#1 Minnesota		Amsoil Arena • Duluth, MN	Kayla Black	T 3–3 ^{OT}	1–3–2 (0–3–1)
October 17	at #10 North Dakota		Ralph Engelstad Arena • Grand Forks, ND	Kayla Black	L 1–2 ^{OT}	1–4–2 (0–4–1)
October 18	at #10 North Dakota		Ralph Engelstad Arena • Grand Forks, ND	Kayla Black	W 1–0	2–4–2 (1–4–1)
October 25	Lindenwood*		Amsoil Arena • Duluth, MN	Kayla Black	W 3–1	3–4–2
October 26	Lindenwood*		Amsoil Arena • Duluth, MN	Karissa Grapp	W 6–2	4–4–2
November 1	Minnesota State	#10	Amsoil Arena • Duluth, MN	Kayla Black	W 6–2	5–4–2 (2–4–1)
November 2	Minnesota State	#10	Amsoil Arena • Duluth, MN	Kayla Black	W 6–3	6–4–2 (3–4–1)
November 14	at St. Cloud State	#9	Herb Brooks National Hockey Center • St. Cloud, MN	Kayla Black	W 6–1	7–4–2 (4–4–1)
November 15	at St. Cloud State	#9	Herb Brooks National Hockey Center • St. Cloud, MN	Kayla Black	W 1–0	8–4–2 (5–4–1)
November 21	Cornell*	#10	Amsoil Arena • Duluth, MN	Kayla Black	W 7–2	9–4–2
November 22	Cornell*	#10	Amsoil Arena • Duluth, MN	Kayla Black	W 2–0	10–4–2
November 29	at #10 Bemidji State	#9	Sanford Center • Bemidji, MN	Kayla Black	L 1–4	10–5–2 (5–5–1)
November 30	at #10 Bemidji State	#9	Sanford Center • Bemidji, MN	Kayla Black	W 2–0	11–5–2 (6–5–1)
December 5	at Ohio State	#8	OSU Ice Rink • Columbus, OH	Kayla Black	T 2–2 ^{OT}	11–5–3 (6–5–2)
December 6	at Ohio State	#8	OSU Ice Rink • Columbus, OH	Kayla Black	W 4–1	12–5–3 (7–5–2)
January 10, 2015	Bemidji State	#7	Amsoil Arena • Duluth, MN	Kayla Black	L 1–4	12–6–3 (7–6–2)
January 11	Bemidji State	#7	Amsoil Arena • Duluth, MN	Kayla Black	W 2–1	13–6–3 (8–6–2)
January 17	St. Cloud State	#7	Amsoil Arena • Duluth, MN	Kayla Black	W 2–0	14–6–3 (9–6–2)
January 18	St. Cloud State	#7	Amsoil Arena • Duluth, MN	Kayla Black	W 3–2	15–6–3 (10–6–2)
January 24	at Minnesota State	#6	All Seasons Arena • Mankato, MN	Kayla Black	W 12–0	16–6–3 (11–6–2)
January 25	at Minnesota State	#6	All Seasons Arena • Mankato, MN	Kayla Black	W 4–0	17–6–3 (12–6–2)
January 30	North Dakota	#6	Amsoil Arena • Duluth, MN	Kayla Black	L 0–1	17–7–3 (12–7–2)
January 31	North Dakota	#6	Amsoil Arena • Duluth, MN	Kayla Black	T 2–2 ^{OT}	17–7–4 (12–7–3)
February 6	at #3 Wisconsin	#7	LaBahn Arena • Madison, WI	Kayla Black	T 0–0 ^{OT}	17–7–5 (12–7–4)
February 7	at #3 Wisconsin	#7	LaBahn Arena • Madison, WI	Kayla Black	L 0–5	17–8–5 (12–8–4)
February 13	at #2 Minnesota	#6	Ridder Arena • Minneapolis, MN	Kayla Black	L 1–7	17–9–5 (12–9–4)
February 14	at #2 Minnesota	#6	Ridder Arena • Minneapolis, MN	Kayla Black	L 0–2	17–10–5 (12–10–4)
February 20	Ohio State	#9	Amsoil Arena • Duluth, MN	Kayla Black	W 3–1	18–10–5 (13–10–4)
February 21	Ohio State	#9	Amsoil Arena • Duluth, MN	Kayla Black	W 5–2	19–10–5 (14–10–4)
WCHA Tournament
February 27	Bemidji State*	#9	Amsoil Arena • Duluth, MN (Quarterfinals, Game 1)	Kayla Black	L 2–3	19–11–5
February 28	Bemidji State*	#9	Amsoil Arena • Duluth, MN (Quarterfinals, Game 2)	Kayla Black	W 2–0	20–11–5
March 1	Bemidji State*	#9	Amsoil Arena • Duluth, MN (Quarterfinals, Game 3)	Kayla Black	L 1–2 ^{OT}	20–12–5
*Non-conference game. ^{#}Rankings from USCHO.com Poll.

== Awards and honors ==
- Ashleigh Brykaliuk
  WCHA Offensive Player of the Week (Week of November 4, 2014)
- Brigette Lacquette
  Defense
  All-WCHA Second Team
- Zoe Hickel
  Defense
  All-WCHA Second Team
