= 2014–15 Wisconsin Badgers women's ice hockey season =

WCHA Final Face-Off champions, 4-0 vs Bemidji State Frozen Four, Lost National Championship Semifinal to Minnesota
- Conference: 2nd WCHA
- Home ice: LaBahn Arena

Rankings
- USA Today/USA Hockey Magazine: 4th
- USCHO.com: 3rd

Record
- Overall: 29-7-4
- Home: 13-4-2
- Road: 14-2-2
- Neutral: 2-1-0

Coaches and captains
- Head coach: Mark Johnson
- Assistant coaches: Dan Koch; Jackie Crum
- Captain: Blayre Turnbull
- Alternate captain(s): Karley Sylvester; Katarina Zgraja

The Wisconsin Badgers represented the University of Wisconsin in WCHA women's ice hockey during the 2014-15 NCAA Division I women's ice hockey season. The Badgers won the WCHA Tournament, and were one of the best teams in the nation, falling in the Frozen Four to their rivals, Minnesota.

== Offseason ==
- August 4: Current Wisconsin players Courtney Burke and Annie Pankowski were invited to the 2014 USA Hockey Women's National Festival in Lake Placid, New York. Outgoing senior Alex Rigsby was also invited. The festival shall determine the roster of the Under-22 team that shall compete in a three-game series versus the Canadian U22/Development Squad from Aug. 21-24 in Calgary.

=== Recruiting ===
Player	Position	Nationality	Notes
Maddie Rolfes	Defense	United States	Hails from Iowa
Lauren Williams	Defense	Canada	Attended Canada's U18 camp
Annie Pankowski	Forward	United States	Invited to the 2014 USA Hockey Women's National Festival
Baylee Wellhausen	Forward	United States	Only Badgers recruit from state of Wisconsin
Emily Clark	Forward	Canada	Competed at IIHF U18 Women's Worlds

=== 2014–15 Badgers ===
No.	Nat.	Player	Class	Pos	Height	DoB	Hometown	Previous team
1		Jorie Walters	Junior	G	5' 4" (1.63 m)		Grinnell, Iowa	Shattuck St. Mary's
2		Mellissa Channell	Sophomore		5' 4" (1.63 m)		Oakville, Ontario	Team Canada U18
3		Maddie Rolfes	Freshman		5' 8" (1.73 m)		West Des Moines, Iowa	Team USA U18
5		Jenny Ryan	Sophomore		5' 4" (1.63 m)		Victor, New York	Team USA U18
6		Courtney Burke	Junior		5' 5" (1.65 m)		Albany, New York	Shattuck St. Mary's
8		Katie Harding	Freshman		5' 7" (1.7 m)		Anchorage, Alaska	Pursuit of Excellence
9		Molly Doner	Junior		5' 5" (1.65 m)		Mukilteo, Washington	North American Hockey Academy
10		Brittany Ammerman	Senior (RS)		5' 6" (1.68 m)		River Vale, New Jersey	North American Hockey Academy
11		Sydney McKibbon	Sophomore		5' 5" (1.65 m)		Oakville, Ontario	Team Canada U18
12		Katy Josephs	Senior		5' 4" (1.63 m)		Calgary, Alberta	Highwood Rangers
13		Katarina Zgraja	Senior		5' 5" (1.65 m)		Waterloo, Ontario	Kitchener-Waterloo Rangers
14		Lauren Williams	Freshman		5' 9" (1.75 m)		Windsor, Ontario	Team Ontario Blue U18
16		Sarah Nurse	Sophomore		5' 8" (1.73 m)		Hamilton, Ontario	Stoney Creek Jr. Sabres
17		Blayre Turnbull (C)	Senior		5' 7" (1.7 m)		Stellarton, Nova Scotia	Shattuck St. Mary's
19		Annie Pankowski	Freshman		5' 9" (1.75 m)		Laguna Hills, California	Irondale HS
20		Mikayla Johnson	Sophomore (RS)		5' 7" (1.7 m)		Madison, Wisconsin	Madison Capitols U19
21		Baylee Wellhausen	Freshman		5' 4" (1.63 m)		Williams Bay, Wisconsin	Shattuck St. Mary's
23		Kim Drake	Junior		5' 10" (1.78 m)		Mosinee, Wisconsin	Shattuck St. Mary's
24		Karley Sylvester (A)	Senior		5' 9" (1.75 m)		Warroad, Minnesota	Warroad HS
25		Erika Sowchuk	Junior		5' 7" (1.7 m)		Fernie, British Columbia	Edge School
26		Emily Clark	Freshman		5' 7" (1.7 m)		Saskatoon, Saskatchewan	Okanagan Hockey Academy
27		Rachel Jones	Junior		5' 6" (1.68 m)		Berlin, Wisconsin	Madison Capitols U19
30		Ann-Renee Desbiens	Sophomore	G	5' 9" (1.75 m)		La Malbaie, Quebec	Team Canada U22
32		Megan Miller	Junior (RS)	G	5' 7" (1.7 m)		Long Grove, Illinois	Boston College

== Schedule ==
Date	Opponent^{#}	Rank^{#}	Site	Decision	Result	Record
Regular Season
September 26	at Lindenwood*	#2	Lindenwood Ice Arena • Wentzville, MO	Megan Miller	W 5–1	1–0–0
September 27	at Lindenwood*	#2	Lindenwood Ice Arena • Wentzville, MO	Jorie Walters	W 6–0	2–0–0
October 3	at Minnesota Duluth	#2	Amsoil Arena • Duluth, MN	Ann-Renee Desbiens	W 4–1	3–0–0 (1–0–0)
October 4	at Minnesota Duluth	#2	Amsoil Arena • Duluth, MN	Ann-Renee Desbiens	W 6–2	4–0–0 (2–0–0)
October 10	Ohio State	#2	LaBahn Arena • Madison, WI	Ann-Renee Desbiens	W 6–0	5–0–0 (3–0–0)
October 12	Ohio State	#2	LaBahn Arena • Madison, WI	Ann-Renee Desbiens	W 3–0	6–0–0 (4–0–0)
October 17	#2 Minnesota	#1	LaBahn Arena • Madison, WI	Ann-Renee Desbiens	L 1–5	6–1–0 (4–1–0)
October 18	#2 Minnesota	#1	LaBahn Arena • Madison, WI	Ann-Renee Desbiens	L 1–2 ^{OT}	6–2–0 (4–2–0)
October 24	at Bemidji State	#2	Sanford Center • Bemidji, MN	Ann-Renee Desbiens	W 2–1	7–2–0 (5–2–0)
October 25	at Bemidji State	#2	Sanford Center • Bemidji, MN	Ann-Renee Desbiens	W 4–3	8–2–0 (6–2–0)
October 31	at #10 North Dakota	#3	Ralph Engelstad Arena • Grand Forks, ND	Ann-Renee Desbiens	T 3–3 ^{OT}	8–2–1 (6–2–1)
November 1	at #10 North Dakota	#3	Ralph Engelstad Arena • Grand Forks, ND	Ann-Renee Desbiens	W 3–2	9–2–1 (7–2–1)
November 13	Minnesota State	#3	LaBahn Arena • Madison, WI	Ann-Renee Desbiens	W 8–2	10–2–1 (8–2–1)
November 14	Minnesota State	#3	LaBahn Arena • Madison, WI	Jorie Walters	W 8–0	11–2–1 (9–2–1)
November 21	at St. Cloud State	#3	Herb Brooks National Hockey Center • St. Cloud, MN	Ann-Renee Desbiens	W 4–0	12–2–1 (10–2–1)
November 22	at St. Cloud State	#3	Herb Brooks National Hockey Center • St. Cloud, MN	Ann-Renee Desbiens	W 3–0	13–2–1 (11–2–1)
November 28	at New Hampshire*	#3	Whittemore Center • Durham, NH	Ann-Renee Desbiens	W 5–0	14–2–1
November 29	at New Hampshire*	#3	Whittemore Center • Durham, NH	Ann-Renee Desbiens	W 5–0	15–2–1
December 5	North Dakota	#3	LaBahn Arena • Madison, WI	Ann-Renee Desbiens	W 2–1 ^{OT}	16–2–1 (12–2–1)
December 7	North Dakota	#3	LaBahn Arena • Madison, WI	Ann-Renee Desbiens	W 2–0	17–2–1 (13–2–1)
January 10, 2015	at #2 Minnesota	#3	Ridder Arena • Minneapolis, MN	Ann-Renee Desbiens	L 1–4	17–3–1 (13–3–1)
January 11	at #2 Minnesota	#3	Ridder Arena • Minneapolis, MN	Ann-Renee Desbiens	T 1–1 ^{OT}	17–3–2 (13–3–2)
January 16	Bemidji State	#3	LaBahn Arena • Madison, WI	Ann-Renee Desbiens	L 1–2	17–4–2 (13–4–2)
January 17	Bemidji State	#3	LaBahn Arena • Madison, WI	Ann-Renee Desbiens	W 2–1 ^{OT}	18–4–2 (14–4–2)
January 24	#7 Clarkson*	#4	LaBahn Arena • Madison, WI	Ann-Renee Desbiens	T 1–1 ^{OT}	18–4–3
January 25	#7 Clarkson*	#4	LaBahn Arena • Madison, WI	Ann-Renee Desbiens	W 4–0	19–4–3
January 30	at Minnesota State	#3	All Seasons Arena • Mankato, MN	Ann-Renee Desbiens	W 3–0	20–4–3 (15–4–2)
January 31	at Minnesota State	#3	All Seasons Arena • Mankato, MN	Ann-Renee Desbiens	W 5–1	21–4–3 (16–4–2)
February 6	#7 Minnesota Duluth	#3	LaBahn Arena • Madison, WI	Ann-Renee Desbiens	T 0–0 ^{OT}	21–4–4 (16–4–3)
February 7	#7 Minnesota Duluth	#3	LaBahn Arena • Madison, WI	Ann-Renee Desbiens	T 5–0	22–4–4 (17–4–3)
February 13	at Ohio State	#3	OSU Ice Rink • Columbus, OH	Ann-Renee Desbiens	W 2–0	23–4–4 (18–4–3)
February 14	at Ohio State	#3	OSU Ice Rink • Columbus, OH	Ann-Renee Desbiens	L 3–4	23–5–4 (18–5–3)
February 20	St. Cloud State	#4	LaBahn Arena • Madison, WI	Ann-Renee Desbiens	L 1–2	23–6–4 (18–6–3)
February 20	St. Cloud State	#4	LaBahn Arena • Madison, WI	Ann-Renee Desbiens	W 5–0	24–6–4 (19–6–3)
WCHA Tournament
February 27	St. Cloud State*	#3	LaBahn Arena • Madison, WI (Quarterfinals, Game 1)	Ann-Renee Desbiens	W 5–1	25–6–4
February 28	St. Cloud State*	#3	LaBahn Arena • Madison, WI (Quarterfinals, Game 2)	Ann-Renee Desbiens	W 4–1	26–6–4
March 7	at #8 North Dakota*	#3	Ralph Engelstad Arena • Grand Forks, ND (Semifinal Game)	Ann-Renee Desbiens	W 4–1	27–6–4
March 8	vs. #10 Bemidji State*	#3	Ralph Engelstad Arena • Grand Forks, ND (WCHA Championship Game Final Face-Off)	Ann-Renee Desbiens	W 4–0	28–6–4
NCAA Tournament
March 14	#5 Boston University*	#3	LaBahn Arena • Madison, WI (NCAA Quarterfinal)	Ann-Renee Desbiens	W 5–1	29–6–4
March 20	at #2 Minnesota*	#3	Ridder Arena • Minneapolis, MN (NCAA Semifinal Frozen Four)	Ann-Renee Desbiens	L 1–3	29–7–4
*Non-conference game. ^{#}Rankings from USCHO.com Poll.

== Awards and honors ==
- Annie Pankowski, 2015 WCHA Rookie of the Year.
- Emily Clark, 2015 WCHA ALL-ROOKIE TEAM
- Annie Pankowski, 2015 WCHA ALL-ROOKIE TEAM

=== WCHA Weekly Honors ===
- Annie Pankowski, WCHA Rookie of the Week (October 1, 2014)
- Annie Pankowski, WCHA Rookie of the Week (Week of November 18, 2014)
- Annie Pankowski, WCHA Rookie of the Week (November 27, 2014)
- Annie Pankowski, WCHA Rookie of the Week (January 27, 2015)
- Emily Clark, WCHA Offensive Player of the Week, (Week of February 3, 2015)
- Blayre Turnbull, WCHA Offensive Player of the Week, (Week of February 10, 2015)
- Ann-Renee Desbiens, WCHA Defensive Player of the Week (Week of November 25, 2014)
- Ann-Renee Desbiens, WCHA Defensive Player of the Week, (Week of February 10, 2015) 2015)
