= All Seasons Arena (Mankato) =

Ice rink venue in Mankato, Minnesota

Coordinates: 44°9′5″N 93°59′18″W

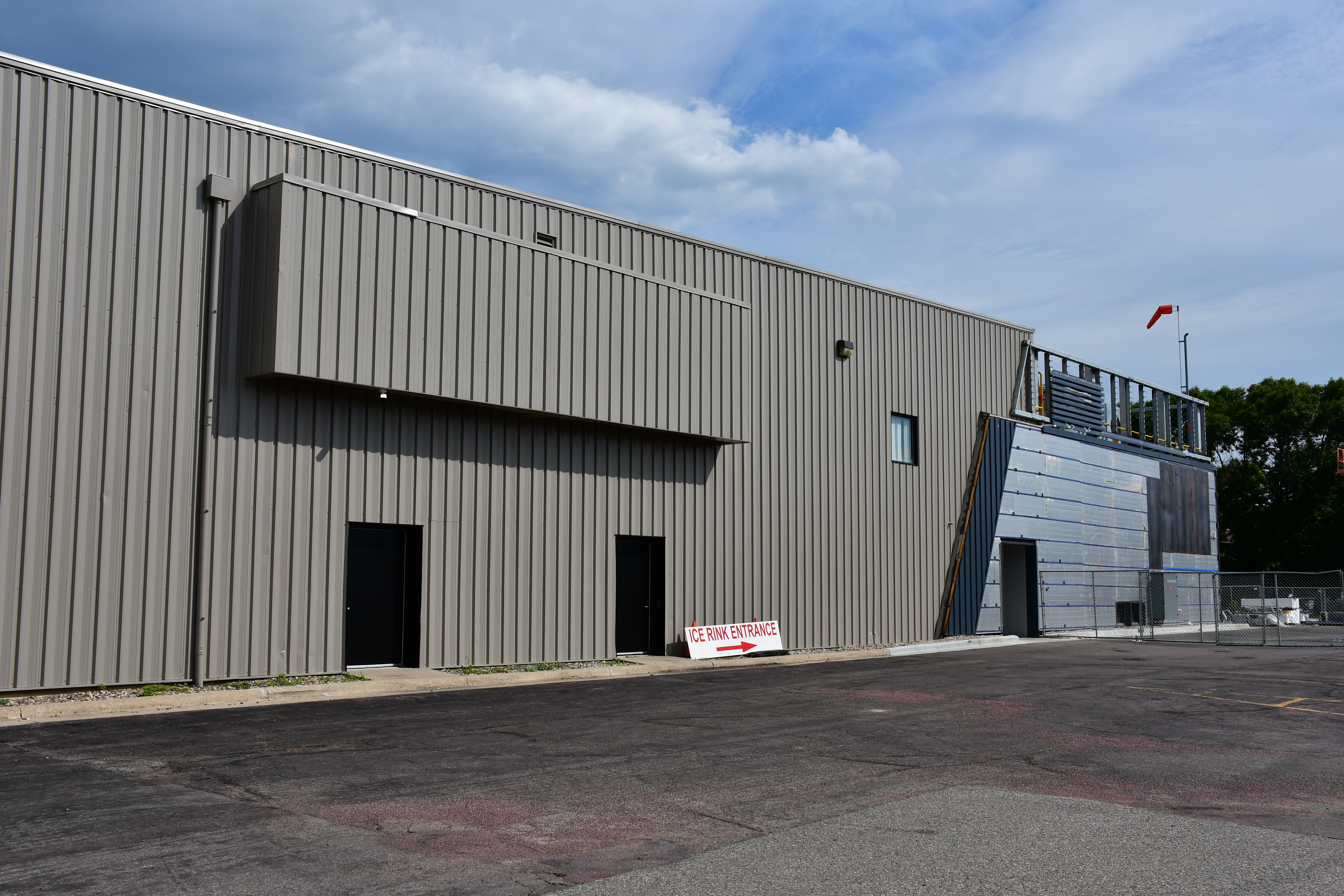
Front entrance to the arena, during construction in 2025.

All Seasons Arena is a two-rink facility built in 1973 and located in Mankato, Minnesota, United States. It is the home of the Mankato Figure Skating Club and the former home of the Minnesota State Mavericks women's ice hockey.

The arena is also used for practices by the Minnesota State Mavericks men's ice hockey team. It was used for men's intercollegiate games until 1995, when they moved to the newly opened Mankato Civic Center.

In May 2024, renovations began, which are expected to be completed in September 2025.
