= 2013–14 Bemidji State Beavers women's ice hockey season =

- Conference: 6th WCHA
- Home ice: Sanford Center

Record
- Overall: 11–21–4 (8–17–3 in WCHA play)
- Home: 6–12–0
- Road: 5–9–4

Coaches and captains
- Head coach: Steve Sertich
- Assistant coaches: Amber Fryklund; Shane Veenker
- Captain(s): Alex Ehlert; Allie Duellman

The Bemidji State Beavers women's ice hockey program represented the Bemidji State University during the 2013-14 NCAA Division I women's ice hockey season. The Beavers finished sixth in WCHA play, and lost to the University of North Dakota in the WCHA playoffs.

== Offseason ==
=== 2013–14 Beavers ===
No.	Nat.	Player	Class	Pos	Height	DoB	Hometown	Previous team
4		Madison Hutchinson	Freshman	D	5' 8" (1.73 m)		Manitou, Manitoba	Pembina Valley Hawks
5		Alex Citrowske	Junior	F	5' 6" (1.68 m)		Savage, Minnesota	Prior Lake HS
6		Kristen Huber	Junior	F	5' 11" (1.8 m)		Kelowna, British Columbia	Pursuit of Excellence
7		Carley Esse	Freshman	D	5' 8" (1.73 m)		Cloquet, Minnesota	Cloquet HS
8		Megan Lushanko	Sophomore	F	5' 3" (1.6 m)		Chisago City, Minnesota	Chisago Lakes HS
9		Kaitlyn Tougas	Sophomore	F	5' 4" (1.63 m)		Thunder Bay, Ontario	Thunder Bay Queens
11		Whitney Wivoda	Sophomore (RS)	F	5' 8" (1.73 m)		Fairbanks, Alaska	Lathrop HS
12		Emily McKnight	Senior	F	5' 8" (1.73 m)		Carman, Manitoba	Lathrop HS
14		Lauren Miller	Freshman	F	5' 7" (1.7 m)		Brockville, Ontario	Nepean Wildcats
15		Ciscely Nelson	Freshman (RS)	F	5' 7" (1.7 m)		Roseau, Minnesota	Roseau HS
16		Stephanie Anderson	Sophomore (RS)	F	5' 9" (1.75 m)		North St. Paul, Minnesota	Minnesota
18		Rachael Kelly	Junior	F	5' 5" (1.65 m)		Rosemount, Minnesota	Rosemount HS
19		Tess Dusik	Senior	F	6' 0" (1.83 m)		Oak Bluff, Manitoba	Balmoral Prep
20		Jenessa Philipczyk	Sophomore (RS)	F	5' 7" (1.7 m)		Stillwater, Minnesota	Minnesota Thoroughbreds
21		Kenzie Menzak	Sophomore	D	5' 7" (1.7 m)		Lethbridge, Alberta	Plattsburgh State
23		Ivana Bilic	Sophomore	D	5' 7" (1.7 m)		Coquitlam, British Columbia	Warner Hockey Academy
24		Alex Ehlert (C)	Senior	D	5' 6" (1.68 m)		Portage, Wisconsin	Madison Capitols AAA
27		Kayleigh Chapman	Junior	D	5' 8" (1.73 m)		Virden, Manitoba	Warner Hockey Academy
28		Allie Duellman (C)	Senior	D	5' 8" (1.73 m)		Maplewood, Minnesota	Roseville Area HS
29		Brittni Mowat	Freshman	G	5' 7" (1.7 m)		Glenboro, Manitoba	Pembina Valley Hawks
30		Erin Deters	Freshman	G	5' 7" (1.7 m)		Sartell, Minnesota	Sartell/Sauk Rapids HS
35		Jessica Havel	Senior (RS)	G	5' 7" (1.7 m)		Grand Rapids, Michigan	Greenway HS
56		Hannah Moher	Sophomore	F	5' 6" (1.68 m)		Milton, Ontario	Mississauga Jr, Chiefs
59		Danielle Williams	Senior	D	5' 10" (1.78 m)		Waconia, Minnesota	Minnesota Thoroughbreds
93		Kristine Grenier	Junior	F	5' 6" (1.68 m)		St. Leon, Manitoba	Mercyhurst

== Schedule ==
Date	Opponent^{#}	Rank^{#}	Site	Decision	Result	Record
Regular Season
September 27	at Lindenwood*		Lindenwood Ice Arena • Wentzville, MO	Brittni Mowat	W 3–2	1–0–0
September 28	at Lindenwood*		Lindenwood Ice Arena • Wentzville, MO	Brittni Mowat	T 1–1 ^{OT}	1–0–1
October 11	Robert Morris*		Sanford Center • Bemidji, MN	Brittni Mowat	L 1–2	1–1–1
October 12	Robert Morris*		Sanford Center • Bemidji, MN	Brittni Mowat	L 0–3	1–2–1
October 18	Lindenwood*		Sanford Center • Bemidji, MN	Brittni Mowat	W 5–0	2–2–1
October 19	Lindenwood*		Sanford Center • Bemidji, MN	Brittni Mowat	W 4–1	3–2–1
October 25	#1 Minnesota		Sanford Center • Bemidji, MN	Brittni Mowat	L 0–4	3–3–1 (0–1–0)
October 26	#1 Minnesota		Sanford Center • Bemidji, MN	Brittni Mowat	L 3–4	3–4–1 (0–2–0)
November 1	#4 North Dakota		Sanford Center • Bemidji, MN	Brittni Mowat	L 2–6	3–5–1 (0–3–0)
November 2	#4 North Dakota		Sanford Center • Bemidji, MN	Jessica Havel	L 1–5	3–6–1 (0–4–0)
November 8	at Ohio State		OSU Ice Rink • Columbus, OH	Brittni Mowat	W 3–2	4–6–1 (1–4–0)
November 9	at Ohio State		OSU Ice Rink • Columbus, OH	Brittni Mowat	T 2–2 ^{OT}	4–6–2 (1–4–1)
November 15	Minnesota State		Sanford Center • Bemidji, MN	Brittni Mowat	W 4–1	5–6–2 (2–4–1)
November 16	Minnesota State		Sanford Center • Bemidji, MN	Brittni Mowat	W 3–2	6–6–2 (3–4–1)
November 22	at Minnesota Duluth		AMSOIL Arena • Duluth, MN	Brittni Mowat	L 0–3	6–7–2 (3–5–1)
November 23	at Minnesota Duluth		AMSOIL Arena • Duluth, MN	Brittni Mowat	W 1–0	7–7–2 (4–5–1)
December 6	at #2 Wisconsin		LaBahn Arena • Madison, WI	Jessica Havel	L 2–7	7–8–2 (4–6–1)
December 6	at #2 Wisconsin		LaBahn Arena • Madison, WI	Jessica Havel	L 0–5	7–9–2 (4–7–1)
January 4, 2014	at Minnesota State		All Seasons Arena • Mankato, MN	Brittni Mowat	L 1–2	7–10–2 (4–8–1)
January 5	at Minnesota State		All Seasons Arena • Mankato, MN	Brittni Mowat	W 1–0	8–10–2 (5–8–1)
January 10	St. Cloud State		Sanford Center • Bemidji, MN	Brittni Mowat	L 1–3	8–11–2 (5–9–1)
January 11	St. Cloud State		Sanford Center • Bemidji, MN	Brittni Mowat	W 2–1	9–11–2 (6–9–1)
January 17	#2 Wisconsin		Sanford Center • Bemidji, MN	Brittni Mowat	L 0–6	9–12–2 (6–10–1)
January 18	#2 Wisconsin		Sanford Center • Bemidji, MN	Brittni Mowat	L 1–3	9–13–2 (6–11–1)
January 24	at #3 North Dakota		Ralph Engelstad Arena • Grand Forks, ND	Brittni Mowat	T 3–3 ^{OT}	9–13–3 (6–11–2)
January 25	at #3 North Dakota		Ralph Engelstad Arena • Grand Forks, ND	Brittni Mowat	L 1–2	9–14–3 (6–12–2)
January 31	Minnesota Duluth		Sanford Center • Bemidji, MN	Brittni Mowat	L 3–5	9–15–3 (6–13–2)
February 1	Minnesota Duluth		Sanford Center • Bemidji, MN	Brittni Mowat	L 1–2	9–16–3 (6–14–2)
February 7	at #1 Minnesota		Ridder Arena • Minneapolis, MN	Brittni Mowat	L 0–10	9–17–3 (6–15–2)
February 8	at #1 Minnesota		Ridder Arena • Minneapolis, MN	Brittni Mowat	L 3–5	9–18–3 (6–16–2)
February 14	Ohio State		Sanford Center • Bemidji, MN	Brittni Mowat	W 4–1	10–18–3 (7–16–2)
February 15	Ohio State		Sanford Center • Bemidji, MN	Brittni Mowat	L 1–3	10–19–3 (7–17–2)
February 21	at St. Cloud State		Herb Brooks National Hockey Center • St. Cloud, MN	Brittni Mowat	T 1–1 ^{OT}	10–19–4 (7–17–3)
February 22	at St. Cloud State		Herb Brooks National Hockey Center • St. Cloud, MN	Jessica Havel	W 3–0	11–19–4 (8–17–3)
WCHA Tournament
February 28	at #9 North Dakota*		Ralph Engelstad Arena • Grand Forks, ND (Quarterfinals, Game 1)	Brittni Mowat	L 1–4	11–20–4
March 1	at #9 North Dakota*		Ralph Engelstad Arena • Grand Forks, ND (Quarterfinals, Game 2)	Brittni Mowat	L 2–3 ^{OT}	11–21–4
*Non-conference game. ^{#}Rankings from USCHO.com Poll.
