= 2013–14 Minnesota Golden Gophers women's ice hockey season =

WCHA Regular season title WCHA Final Face-Off title Runner-up, NCAA Frozen Four, L, 4–5 vs. Clarkson Golden Knights
- Conference: 1 WCHA
- Home ice: Ridder Arena

Rankings
- USCHO.com: 2
- USA Today/USA Hockey Magazine: 2

Record
- Overall: 38–2–1
- Home: 17–1–1
- Road: 18–0–0
- Neutral: 3–1–0

Coaches and captains
- Head coach: Brad Frost
- Assistant coaches: Joel Johnson; Nadine Muzerall
- Captain(s): Bethany Brausen; Sarah Davis; Baylee Gillanders; Kelly Terry

The 2013–14 Minnesota Golden Gophers women's ice hockey season represented the University of Minnesota during the 2013–14 NCAA Division I women's ice hockey season. They were coached by Brad Frost in his seventh season. Their senior class featured Bethany Brausen, Sarah Davis, Baylee Gillanders and Kelly Terry, compiling a record of 139–17–5. Hannah Brandt, Rachel Bona and Sarah Davis would each reach the 100 point career mark.

The Golden Gophers logged the best attendance in NCAA women's hockey with 84,672 fans while setting an NCAA women's hockey record with a power play of 32.7 percent. In addition, the Golden Gophers would qualify for the NCAA tournament for the tenth time in program history. In the postseason, the Golden Gophers were defeated 2–1 in overtime by the RIT Tigers during the WCHA championship tournament. In the quarterfinals, the Golden Gophers defeated Cornell by a 3–2 mark on home ice. Advancing to the Frozen Four championship game in Hamden, Connecticut, the Golden Gophers were bested by the Clarkson Golden Knights.

== Offseason ==
=== Recruiting ===
Player	Position	Nationality	Notes
Dani Cameranesi	Forward	United States	Member of USA U18 national team
Kelsey Cline	Defense	United States	Hails from Bloomington, Minnesota
Kate Flug	Forward	United States	Finalist for 2013 Minnesota Ms. Hockey Award
Paige Haley	Defense/Forward	United States	Competed at Red Wing High School
Sidney Peters	Goaltender	United States	Graduated from North American Hockey Academy
Kate Schipper	Freshman	United States	Competed at Breck School
Megan Wolfe	Defense	United States	Hails from Eagan, Minnesota

== Exhibition ==
Date	Opponent	League	Final Score
September 26	Team Japan	IIHF	6–0, Minnesota
September 27	Univ. of British Columbia	CIS	7–0, Minnesota

== Regular season ==
=== Standings ===
2013–14 Western Collegiate Hockey Association standings
	Conference								Overall					
	GP	W	L	T	SOW	PTS	GF	GA	GP	W	L	T	GF	GA
Minnesota†*	28	26	1	1	0	79	128	29	41	38	2	1	195	49
Wisconsin	28	21	5	2	1	66	86	33	38	28	8	2	114	47
North Dakota	28	14	10	4	2	48	73	63	36	20	12	4	96	74
Minnesota Duluth	28	11	11	6	4	43	56	65	36	15	15	6	85	84
Ohio State	28	9	14	5	2	34	56	75	37	15	17	5	82	90
Bemidji State	28	8	17	3	2	29	47	88	36	11	21	4	64	104
Minnesota State	28	7	20	1	0	22	46	92	37	13	23	1	71	106
St. Cloud State	28	3	21	4	2	15	40	87	36	4	27	5	48	111
Championship: † indicates conference regular season champion; * indicates conference tournament champion Updated July 21, 2024

=== Schedule ===
Date	Time	Opponent^{#}	Rank^{#}	Site	Decision	Result	Attendance	Record
Regular Season
October 4	6:00	at Colgate*	#1	Starr Rink • Hamilton, NY	Leveille	W 3–1	533	1–0–0
Oct 5	2:00	at Colgate*	#1	Starr Rink • Hamilton, NY	Leveille	W 8–3	481	2–0–0
Oct 11	6:07	#4/5 Wisconsin	#1	Ridder Arena • Minneapolis, MN	Leveille	W 2–1	2,754	3–0–0 (1–0–0)
Oct 12	4:07	#4/5 Wisconsin	#1	Ridder Arena • Minneapolis, MN	Leveille	W 2–0	2,243	4–0–0 (2–0–0)
Oct 18	6:07	at #7 Minnesota Duluth	#1	AMSOIL Arena • Duluth, MN	Leveille	W 4–0	1,479	5–0–0 (3–0–0)
Oct 19	6:07	at #7 Minnesota Duluth	#1	AMSOIL Arena • Duluth, MN	Leveille	W 6–3	1,584	6–0–0 (4–0–0)
Oct 25	7:07	at Bemidji State	#1	Sanford Center • Bemidji, MN	Leveille	W 4–0	274	7–0–0 (5–0–0)
Oct 26	4:07	at Bemidji State	#1	Sanford Center • Bemidji, MN	Leveille	W 4–3	354	8–0–0 (6–0–0)
Nov 1	7:07	Minnesota State	#1	Ridder Arena • Minneapolis, MN	Leveille	W 4–1	2,731	9–0–0 (7–0–0)
Nov 2	3:07	at Minnesota State	#1	All Seasons Arena • Mankato, MN	Leveille	W 7–0	255	10–0–0 (8–0–0)
Nov 8	3:07	at St. Cloud State	#1	Herb Brooks National Hockey Center • St. Cloud, MN	Leveille	W 4–1	286	11–0–0 (9–0–0)
Nov 9	3:07	at St. Cloud State	#1	Herb Brooks National Hockey Center • St. Cloud, MN	Leveille	W 4–3	453	12–0–0 (10–0–0)
Nov 16	2:07	#4 North Dakota	#1	Ridder Arena • Minneapolis, MN	Leveille	W 6–1	2,481	13–0–0 (11–0–0)
Nov 17	2:07	#4 North Dakota	#1	Ridder Arena • Minneapolis, MN	Leveille	L 2–3	3,150	13–1–0 (11–1–0)
Nov 23	3:00	Yale	#1	Ingalls Rink • New Haven, CT	Leveille	W 5–1	567	14–1–0 (11–1–0)
Nov 24	11:00	Yale	#1	Ingalls Rink • New Haven, CT	Leveille	W 4–1	385	15–1–0 (11–1–0)
Nov 30	4:07	Princeton	#1	Ridder Arena • Minneapolis, MN	Leveille	W 6–0	2,158	16–1–0 (11–1–0)
Dec 1	1:07	Princeton	#1	Ridder Arena • Minneapolis, MN	Leveille	W 9–1	1,752	17–1–0 (11–1–0)
Dec 7	5:07	at Ohio State	#1	The Ohio State University Ice Rink • Columbus, OH	Leveille	W 9–2	239	18–1–0 (12–1–0)
Dec 8	11:07	at Ohio State	#1	The Ohio State University Ice Rink • Columbus, OH	Leveille	W 5–1	259	19–1–0 (13–1–0)
Jan 10	7:07	Ohio State	#1	Ridder Arena • Minneapolis, MN	Leveille	W 6–0	2,776	20–1–0 (14–1–0)
Jan 11	6:07	Ohio State	#1	Ridder Arena • Minneapolis, MN	Leveille	T 2–2	2,203	20–1–1 (14–1–1–0)
Jan 17	4:30	Minnesota State	#1	TCF Bank Stadium • Minneapolis, MN (Hockey City Classic)	Leveille	W 4–0	6,623	21–1–1 (15–1–1–0)
Jan 19	1:07	at Minnesota State	#1	All Seasons Arena • Mankato, MN	Leveille	W 5–0	323	22–1–1 (16–1–1–0)
Jan 24	7:07	St. Cloud State	#1	Ridder Arena • Minneapolis, MN	Leveille	W 3–0	2,157	23–1–1 (17–1–1–0)
Jan 25	7:07	St. Cloud State	#1	Ridder Arena • Minneapolis, MN	Leveille	W 3–1	2,354	24–1–1 (18–1–1–0)
Jan 31	7:07	at #3 North Dakota	#1	Ralph Engelstad Arena • Grand Forks, ND	Leveille	W 5–1	5,835	25–1–1 (19–1–1–0)
Feb 1	7:07	at #3 Princeton	#1	Ralph Engelstad Arena • Grand Forks, ND	Leveille	W 3–1	1,856	26–1–1 (20–1–1–0)
Feb 7	7:07	Bemidji State	#1	Ridder Arena • Minneapolis, MN	Leveille	W 10–0	1,346	27–1–1 (21–1–1–0)
Feb 8	4:07	Bemidji State	#1	Ridder Arena • Minneapolis, MN	Leveille	W 5–3	2,143	28–1–1 (22–1–1–0)
Feb 14	7:07	at #2 Wisconsin	#1	LaBahn Arena • Madison, WI	Leveille	W 3–2	2,273	29–1–1 (23–1–1–0)
Feb 15	7:07	at #2 Wisconsin	#1	Kohl Center • Madison, WI	Leveille	W 4–0	13,573	30–1–1 (24–1–1–0)
Feb 21	7:07	Minnesota Duluth	#1	Ridder Arena • Minneapolis, MN	Leveille	W 6–0	1,533	31–1–1 (25–1–1–0)
Feb 22	4:07	Minnesota Duluth	#1	Ridder Arena • Minneapolis, MN	Leveille	W 6–0	1,993	32–1–1 (26–1–1–0)
WCHA Tournament
Feb 28	7:07	St. Cloud State*	#1	Ridder Arena • Minneapolis, MN	Leveille	W 4–1	1,102	33–1–1 (26–1–1–0)
Mar 1	4:07	St. Cloud State*	#1	Ridder Arena • Minneapolis, MN	Leveille	W 7–1	1,388	34–1–1 (26–1–1–0)
Mar 7	7:00	Bemidji State*	#1	Sanford Center • Bemidji, MN	Leveille	W 4–1	709	35–1–1 (26–1–1–0)
Mar 8	7:00	North Dakota*	#1	Sanford • Bemidji, MN	Leveille	W 3–1	717	36–1–1 (26–1–1–0)
NCAA Tournament
Mar 15	4:07	Boston University*	#1	Ridder Arena • Minneapolis, MN	Leveille	W 5–1	2,606	37–1–1 (26–1–1–0)
Mar 21	4:00	vs. #3 Wisconsin*	#1	High Point Solutions Arena • Hamden, CT	Leveille	W 5–3	3,171	38–1–1 (26–1–1–0)
Mar 23	2:00	vs. #4 Clarkson*	#1	High Point Solutions Arena • Hamden, CT	Leveille	L 4–5	3,573	38–2–1 (26–1–1–0)
*Non-conference game. ^{#}Rankings from USCHO.com Poll.

=== Roster ===
No.	Nat.	Player	Class	Pos	Height	DoB	Hometown	Previous team
3		Kate Flug	Freshman	F	5' 8" (1.73 m)	1995-02-15	Roseville, Minnesota	Roseville Area High School
5		Rachel Ramsey	Junior	D	6' 0" (1.83 m)	1992-10-14	Chanhassen, Minnesota	Minnetonka High School
6		Kate Schipper	Freshman	F	5' 4" (1.63 m)	1995-06-28	Brooklyn Park, Minnesota	Breck School
7		Rachael Bona	Junior	F	5' 5" (1.65 m)	1992-10-25	Coon Rapids, Minnesota	Coon Rapids High School
9		Sarah Davis	Senior	F	5' 4" (1.63 m)	1988-04-24	Paradise, Newfoundland	Warner Hockey School
10		Kelly Terry	Senior	F	5' 6" (1.68 m)	1992-06-06	Whitby, Ontario	Sinclair Secondary School
11		Kelsey Cline	Freshman	D/F	5' 6" (1.68 m)	1995-02-28	Bloomington, Minnesota	Bloomington Jefferson High School
12		Megan Wolfe	Freshman	D	5' 8" (1.73 m)	1995-06-08	Eagan, Minnesota	Eagan High School
13		Milica McMillen	Sophomore	D	5' 10" (1.78 m)	1993-07-13	Saint Paul, Minnesota	Breck School
14		Maryanne Menefee	Sophomore	F	5' 6" (1.68 m)	1994-01-30	Lansing, Michigan	Lansing Eastern High School
15		Paige Haley	Freshman	D/F	5' 9" (1.75 m)	1995-07-21	Red Wing, Minnesota	Red Wing High School
16		Bethany Brausen	Senior	F	5' 5" (1.65 m)	1992-05-16	Little Canada, Minnesota	Roseville Area High School
17		Jordyn Burns	Junior	D/F	5' 7" (1.7 m)	1992-09-29	Chanhassen, Minnesota	Benilde-St. Margaret's
18		Brook Garzone	Sophomore	D/F	5' 6" (1.68 m)	1993-04-29	Sand Springs, Oklahoma	Shattuck-Saint Mary's
20		Meghan Lorence	Junior	F	5' 7" (1.7 m)	1992-06-25	Mounds View, Minnesota	Irondale High School
21		Dani Cameranesi	Freshman	F	5' 5" (1.65 m)	1995-06-30	Plymouth, Minnesota	Blake School
22		Hannah Brandt	Sophomore	F	5' 6" (1.68 m)	1993-11-27	Vadnais Heights, Minnesota	Hill-Murray School
27		Baylee Gillanders	Senior	D	5' 11" (1.8 m)	1992-08-09	Kyle, Saskatchewan	Warner Hockey School
29		Amanda Leveille	Sophomore	G	5' 7" (1.7 m)	1994-06-10	Kingston, Ontario	Frontenac Secondary School
31		Shyler Sletta	Junior	G	5' 5" (1.65 m)	1993-05-22	Elko New Market, Minnesota	New Prague High School
37		Sidney Peters	Freshman	G	5' 10" (1.78 m)	1995-02-26	Geneva, Illinois	North American Hockey Academy

== News and notes ==
- November 2, 2013: In a 7–0 road win against Minnesota State, Sarah Davis earned an assist for the 100 point of her career.
- November 16, 2013: Competing against the North Dakota Fighting Sioux, Hannah Brandt logged an assist for career point 100.
- November 17, 2013: A 3–2 loss suffered at the hands of the North Dakota Fighting Sioux snapped the Golden Gophers NCAA record winning streak at 62 victories. The streak began on February 18, 2012.
- November 23, 2013: A 5–1 victory against the Yale Bulldogs provided head coach Brad Frost with the 200th win of his coaching career.
- January 17, 2014: The Golden Gophers hosted their first outdoor game in program history. Called the Hockey City Classic, the event was hosted at TCF Bank Stadium. Competing against the Minnesota State Mavericks, Sarah Davis compiled three points in a 4–0 triumph. In addition, freshman Jordyn Burns logged the first goal of her career.
- January 31, 2014: On the road against North Dakota, the programs played in front of 5,835 fans, a UND program record. Of note, the Golden Gophers would prevail by a 5–1 mark in Grand Forks.
- February 14, 2014: A 3–2 road win versus Wisconsin secured the WCHA regular season title for the Golden Gophers. The game winning tally was logged by freshman forward Dani Cameranesi.
- February 15, 2014: Once again competing against Wisconsin, the two programs set an NCAA women's hockey attendance record by competing in front of 13,573 fans.
- February 15–22, 2014: Sophomore goaltender Amanda Leveille had a three-game shutout streak.
- February 28, 2014: Playing against St. Cloud State, Rachel Bona registered two assists in order to earn the 100 point of her career.
- A sixth WCHA Final Face-Off title was earned in a 3–1 win versus the North Dakota Fighting Sioux.
- In the NCAA Quarterfinals against Boston University, Kelly Terry scored a hat trick while Rachel Ramsey contributed three points (one goal, two assists) in a 5–1 victory.
- Against rival Wisconsin in the NCAA Frozen Four, the squad scored three unanswered goals in the third period to overcome a 3–2 deficit. Goaltender Amanda Leveille compiled a career-best 34 saves in the effort.
- By losing in the NCAA championship game against the Clarkson Golden Knights, it snapped the program record of 50 consecutive wins away from Ridder Arena. In addition, the loss resulted in the program dropping to #2 in the national rankings. It snapped the mark of 46 consecutive times at #1 in USCHO.com polls and 50 straight on top of the USA Today/USA Hockey Magazine polls.

== Awards and honors ==
- Hannah Brandt, Finalist, 2014 Patty Kazmaier Memorial Award
- Dani Cameranesi, WCHA Final Face-Off All-Tournament Team
- Laura Halldorson, Inductee into University of Minnesota's M Club Hall of Fame
- Amanda Leveille, WCHA Final Face-Off All-Tournament Team
- Rachel Ramsey, WCHA Final Face-Off Most Valuable Player
- Kelly Terry, WCHA Final Face-Off All-Tournament Team

=== Golden Gophers at the Winter Games ===
- Gophers alumnae Mira Jalosuo and Noora Räty skated for Finland
- Team USA featured alumnae Megan Bozek, Gigi Marvin and Anne Schleper
- Current Gophers Amanda Kessel and Lee Stecklein were also named to Team USA
