= 2013–14 Syracuse Orange women's ice hockey season =

- Conference: 4th College Hockey America
- Home ice: Tennity Ice Skating Pavilion

Record
- Overall: 20-14-3
- Conference: 9-8-3
- Home: 10-7-1
- Road: 10-7-2

Coaches and captains
- Head coach: Paul Flanagan 6th season
- Assistant coaches: Alison Domenico; Brendon Knight
- Captain: Brittney Krebs Margot Scharfe

The Syracuse Orange women represented Syracuse University in CHA women's ice hockey during the 2013-14 NCAA Division I women's ice hockey season. It was the second consecutive season that the Orange won 20 games. Most of their wins came in non-conference contests, thanks to a solid defensive game.

== Offseason ==
- August 30: Alumni Holly Carrie-Mattimoe and Lisa Mullan were drafted by the Toronto Furies of the CWHL.

=== Recruiting ===
Player	Position	Nationality	Notes
Morgan Blank	Forward	United States	Played with the Pittsburgh Penguins Elite
Erin Brand	Forward/Defense	United States	Northwood Academy grad
Eleanor Haines	Forward	United States	Captain at Canterbury School
Larissa Martyniuk	Defense	Canada	Played for Shaftesbury Prep
Laurence Porlier	Forward	Canada	Member of Team Quebec
Elizabeth Scala	Forward	United States	Played for National Sports Academy
Heather Schwarz	Forward	United States	Standout for the Boston Shamrocks
Jessica Sibley	Forward	Canada	Named to Team Saskatchewan

== Standings ==
2013–14 College Hockey America standings
	Conference record							Overall record					
	GP	W	L	T	PTS	GF	GA	GP	W	L	T	GF	GA
#6 Mercyhurst^{†}	20	15	3	2	32	77	31	33	24	9	4	123	70
Robert Morris	20	13	5	2	28	57	33	35	25	8	4	100	59
RIT*	20	11	7	2	24	51	44	38	20	15	3	87	95
Syracuse	20	9	8	3	21	61	46	37	20	14	3	99	75
Lindenwood	20	5	13	2	12	35	72	34	5	26	3	46	121
Penn State	20	1	18	1	3	26	79	38	6	29	3	49	130
Championship: Mercyhurst † indicates conference regular season champion; * indicates conference tournament champion Final rankings: USCHO.com Poll

== Roster ==
=== 2013–14 Orange ===
No.	Nat.	Player	Class	Pos	Height	DoB	Hometown	Previous team
1		Amanda Carridi	Sophomore	G			North Adams, Massachusetts	North Adams HS
2		Nicole Renault	Sophomore	D	5' 7" (1.7 m)		Plymouth, Michigan	Little Caesar's U19
3		Julie Knerr	Junior	F	5' 2" (1.57 m)		Dollard-des-Ormeaux, Quebec	John Abbot College
4		Akane Hosoyamada	Senior (RS)	D	5' 4" (1.63 m)		Banff, Alberta	Warner Hockey School
5		Sadie St. Germain	Senior	F	5' 6" (1.68 m)		Banff, Alberta	Warner Hockey School
6		Danielle Leslie	Sophomore	D	5' 5" (1.65 m)		Winnipeg, Manitoba	Team Manitoba U18
7		Jessica Sibley	Freshman	F	5' 5" (1.65 m)		Luseland, Saskatchewan	Team Saskatchewan U18
8		Brittney Krebs	Senior	F	5' 7" (1.7 m)		Marathon, New York	Team Manitoba U18
9		Allie Lacombe	Junior	F	5' 5" (1.65 m)		Eden Prairie, Minnesota	Eden Prairie HS
10		Morgan Blank	Freshman	F			Fort Mitchell, Kentucky	Pittsburgh Penguins Elite
11		Cara Johnson	Senior	F	5' 8" (1.73 m)		Plymouth, Minnesota	Hopkins HS
12		Nicole Ferrera	Junior	F	5' 4" (1.63 m)		Winthrop, Massachusetts	Assabet Valley U19
14		Melissa Piacentini	Sophomore	F	5' 2" (1.57 m)		South Weymouth, Massachusetts	Assabet Valley U19
16		Kaillie Goodnough	Junior	D	5' 4" (1.63 m)		Mannsville, New York	National Sports Academy
17		Melissa Martyniuk	Freshman	D			Winnipeg, Manitoba	Team Manitoba U18
18		Erin Brand	Freshman	F/D	5' 5" (1.65 m)		Long Beach, New York	Northwood Academy
19		Margot Scharfe (C)	Senior	F	5' 7" (1.7 m)		Toronto, Ontario	Mississauga Jr. Chiefs
22		Laurence Porlier	Freshman	F	5' 7" (1.7 m)		Maria, Quebec	Brewster Academy
24		Eleanor Haines	Freshman	F			Huntington, New York	Canterbury School
25		Elizabeth Scala	Freshman	F	5' 8" (1.73 m)		Rumford, Rhode Island	National Sports Academy
27		Heather Schwartz	Freshman	F			Naugatuck, Connecticut	Boston Shamrocks
28		Caitlin Roach	Senior	D	5' 8" (1.73 m)		Dearborn Heights, Michigan	Detroit Honeybaked
29		Jenesica Drinkwater	Senior	G	5' 7" (1.7 m)		Brantford, Ontario	Stoney Creek Jr. Sabres
32		Kallie Billadeau	Senior	G	5' 7" (1.7 m)		Minnetonka, Minnesota	Hopkins HS

== Schedule ==
Date	Opponent^{#}	Rank^{#}	Site	Decision	Result	Record
Regular Season
October 4	at #10 Northeastern*		Matthews Arena • Boston, MA	Kallie Billadeau	W 4–1	1–0–0
October 5	at New Hampshire*		Whittemore Center • Durham, NH	Kallie Billadeau	L 2–3	1–1–0
October 11	#3 Clarkson*		Tennity Ice Skating Pavilion • Syracuse, NY	Kallie Billadeau	L 1–2	1–2–0
October 12	at #3 Clarkson*		Cheel Arena • Potsdam, NY	Kallie Billadeau	L 0–4	1–3–0
October 18	at Providence*		Schneider Arena • Providence, RI	Kallie Billadeau	L 1–2	1–4–0
October 19	at Providence*		Schneider Arena • Providence, RI	Jenesica Drinkwater	W 4–1	2–4–0
October 25	#4 Boston College*		Tennity Ice Skating Pavilion • Syracuse, NY	Kallie Billadeau	W 4–1	3–4–0
October 26	Union*		Tennity Ice Skating Pavilion • Syracuse, NY	Jenesica Drinkwater	W 5–2	4–4–0
November 9	at Penn State		Pegula Ice Arena • University Park, PA	Kallie Billadeau	W 2–1	5–4–0 (1–0–0)
November 10	at Penn State		Pegula Ice Arena • University Park, PA	Jenesica Drinkwater	W 4–3 ^{OT}	6–4–0 (2–0–0)
November 15	at #10 Mercyhurst		Mercyhurst Ice Center • Erie, PA	Kallie Billadeau	T 3–3 ^{OT}	6–4–1 (2–0–1)
November 16	at #10 Mercyhurst		Mercyhurst Ice Center • Erie, PA	Kallie Billadeau	L 3–5	6–5–1 (2–1–1)
November 22	Robert Morris		Tennity Ice Skating Pavilion • Syracuse, NY	Kallie Billadeau	T 1–1 ^{OT}	6–5–2 (2–1–2)
November 23	Robert Morris		Tennity Ice Skating Pavilion • Syracuse, NY	Kallie Billadeau	L 1–2	6–6–2 (2–2–2)
November 26	Colgate*		Onondaga County War Memorial • Syracuse, NY	Jenesica Drinkwater	W 2–1	7–6–2
December 3	#3 Cornell*		Onondaga County War Memorial • Syracuse, NY	Kallie Billadeau	L 2–5	7–7–2
December 6	Lindenwood		Tennity Ice Skating Pavilion • Syracuse, NY	Jenesica Drinkwater	L 1–2	7–8–2 (2–3–2)
December 7	Lindenwood		Tennity Ice Skating Pavilion • Syracuse, NY	Kallie Billadeau	W 4–1	8–8–2 (3–3–2)
January 4, 2014	at Vermont*		Gutterson Fieldhouse • Burlington, VT	Jenesica Drinkwater	W 4–3	9–8–2
January 5	at Vermont*		Gutterson Fieldhouse • Burlington, VT	Jenesica Drinkwater	W 3–2	10–8–2
January 10	at RIT		Frank Ritter Memorial Ice Arena • Rochester, NY	Jenesica Drinkwater	L 3–4	10–9–2 (3–4–2)
January 14	at Colgate*		Starr Rink • Hamilton, NY	Jenesica Drinkwater	W 2–0	11–9–2
January 17	RIT		Tennity Ice Skating Pavilion • Syracuse, NY	Jenesica Drinkwater	W 5–4 ^{OT}	12–9–2 (4–4–2)
January 24	Penn State		Tennity Ice Skating Pavilion • Syracuse, NY	Jenesica Drinkwater	W 3–2 ^{OT}	13–9–2 (5–4–2)
January 25	Penn State		Tennity Ice Skating Pavilion • Syracuse, NY	Jenesica Drinkwater	W 3–0	14–9–2 (6–4–2)
January 31	#10 Mercyhurst		Tennity Ice Skating Pavilion • Syracuse, NY	Jenesica Drinkwater	L 2–3	14–10–2 (6–5–2)
February 1	#10 Mercyhurst		Tennity Ice Skating Pavilion • Syracuse, NY	Jenesica Drinkwater	L 1–2	14–11–2 (6–6–2)
February 4	St. Lawrence*		Onondaga County War Memorial • Syracuse, NY	Jenesica Drinkwater	W 3–0	15–11–2
February 7	at #9 Robert Morris		84 Lumber Arena • Neville Township, PA	Jenesica Drinkwater	T 3–3 ^{OT}	15–11–3 (6–6–3)
February 8	at #9 Robert Morris		84 Lumber Arena • Neville Township, PA	Jenesica Drinkwater	W 3–1	16–11–3 (7–6–3)
February 14	at Lindenwood		Lindenwood Ice Arena • Wentzville, MO	Jenesica Drinkwater	W 5–2	17–11–3 (8–6–3)
February 15	at Lindenwood		Lindenwood Ice Arena • Wentzville, MO	Jenesica Drinkwater	W 2–1	18–11–3 (9–6–3)
February 21	at RIT		Frank Ritter Memorial Ice Arena • Rochester, NY	Jenesica Drinkwater	L 1–3	18–12–3 (9–7–3)
February 22	RIT		Tennity Ice Skating Pavilion • Syracuse, NY	Jenesica Drinkwater	L 1–2 ^{OT}	18–13–3 (9–8–3)
CHA Tournament
February 28	Lindenwood*		Tennity Ice Skating Pavilion • Syracuse, NY (Quarterfinal, Game 1)	Jenesica Drinkwater	W 4-1	19–13–3
March 1	Lindenwood*		Tennity Ice Skating Pavilion • Syracuse, NY (Quarterfinal, Game 2)	Jenesica Drinkwater	W 6-0	20–13–3
March 7	at #8 Mercyhurst*		Mercyhurst Ice Center • Erie, PA (Semifinal Game)	Jenesica Drinkwater	L 1-2	20–14–3
*Non-conference game. ^{#}Rankings from USCHO.com Poll.

== Awards and honors ==
Sophomore Defender Nicole Renault was named to the All-CHA First Team. Sophomore Forward Melissa Piacentine was named to the All-CHA Second Team. Forward Jessica Sibley and Defender Larissa Martyniuk were named to the All-Rookie Team.
