= 2013–14 RIT Tigers women's ice hockey season =

CHA Tournament Champions
- Conference: 3rd CHA
- Home ice: Frank Ritter Memorial Ice Arena

Record
- Overall: 20–15–3
- Conference: 11–7–2
- Home: 12–5–0
- Road: 5–9–3
- Neutral: 3–1–0

Coaches and captains
- Head coach: Scott McDonald (8th season)
- Assistant coaches: Matt Woodard; Shivaun Siegl
- Captain(s): Lindsay Grigg; Celeste Brown
- Alternate captain(s): Morgan Scoyne; Melissa Bromley

The RIT Tigers represented the Rochester Institute of Technology in College Hockey America during the 2013-14 NCAA Division I women's ice hockey season. In only their second year at the Division I level, the Tigers won the CHA Tournament, defeating the Mercyhurst Lakers. NCAA rules prohibited RIT from participation in the NCAA National Championship Tournament, because teams moving to Division I have a two-year probationary period.

On December 14, 2013, RIT played Clarkson at Frontier Field, an outdoor venue in Rochester, NY.

== Standings ==
2013–14 College Hockey America standings
	Conference record							Overall record					
	GP	W	L	T	PTS	GF	GA	GP	W	L	T	GF	GA
#6 Mercyhurst^{†}	20	15	3	2	32	77	31	33	24	9	4	123	70
Robert Morris	20	13	5	2	28	57	33	35	25	8	4	100	59
RIT*	20	11	7	2	24	51	44	38	20	15	3	87	95
Syracuse	20	9	8	3	21	61	46	37	20	14	3	99	75
Lindenwood	20	5	13	2	12	35	72	34	5	26	3	46	121
Penn State	20	1	18	1	3	26	79	38	6	29	3	49	130
Championship: Mercyhurst † indicates conference regular season champion; * indicates conference tournament champion Final rankings: USCHO.com Poll

=== Recruiting ===
Player	Position	Nationality	Notes
Cassie Clayton	Forward	Canada	Played with the Mississauga Jr. Chiefs
Lauren Klein	Defense	United States	Prolific Scorer with Mounds HS (Minnesota)
Jetta Rackleff	Goaltender	United States	Member of Team USA Inline Hockey Team
Brittany St. James	Forward	Canada	One of Two Recruits from the Durham Lightning
Lindsay Stenason	Forward/Defense	Canada	Starred with Oakville Jr. Hornets
Brooke Stoddart	Goaltender	Canada	Minded Net for Brampton Thunder
Mackenzie Stone	Forward	Canada	Played for the Nepean Wildcats
Taylor Thurston	Defense	Canada	Stones's Teammate on Nepean squad
Dakota Waites	Forward	Canada	Played with St. James in Durham
Caitlin Wallace	Forward/Defense	Canada	Played with Stoney Creek Jr. Sabres

== Roster ==
=== 2013–14 Tigers ===
No.	Nat.	Player	Class	Pos	Height	DoB	Hometown	Previous team
2		Taylor Thurston	Freshman	D	5' 6" (1.68 m)		Kanata, Ontario	Nepean Wildcats
3		Morgan Scoyne (A)	Junior	D	5' 8" (1.73 m)		Drumbo, Ontario	Stoney Creek Sabres
4		Caitlin Wallace	Freshman	F/D	5' 9" (1.75 m)		Brantford, Ontario	Stoney Creek Sabres
6		Lauren Klein	Freshman	D	5' 6" (1.68 m)		Shoreview, Minnesota	Mounds View HS
7		Dakota Waites	Freshman	F	5' 6" (1.68 m)		Whitby, Ontario	Durham West Jr. Lightning
8		Julie Hall	Junior	F	5' 7" (1.7 m)		Mississauga, Ontario	Mississauga Jr. Chiefs
9		Lindsay Stenason	Freshman	F	5' 6" (1.68 m)		Oakville, Ontario	Oakville Hornets
14		Mackenzie Stone	Freshman	F	5' 8" (1.73 m)		Kars, Ontario	Nepean Wildcats
15		Kolbee McRea	Junior	F	5' 9" (1.75 m)		Wawa, Ontario	Burlington Barracudas
17		Carly Payerl	Sophomore	F	5' 9" (1.75 m)		Kitchener, Ontario	Waterloo K-W Rangers
18		Brittany St. James	Freshman	F	5' 8" (1.73 m)		Orono, Ontario	Durham West Jr. Lightning
19		Marissa Maugeri	Junior	F	5' 3" (1.6 m)		Ajax, Ontario	Durham West Jr. Lightning
20		Erin Zach	Senior	F	5' 3" (1.6 m)		Elmira, Ontario	Cambridge Fury
21		Emilee Bulleid	Junior	D	5' 5" (1.65 m)		Waterdown, Ontario	Stoney Creek Sabres
22		Katie Hubert	Sophomore	F	5' 8" (1.73 m)		Burlington, Ontario	Burlington Jr. Barracudas
23		Lindsay Grigg (C)	Junior	F/D	5' 6" (1.68 m)		Oakville, Ontario	Oakville Hornets
24		Celeste Brown (C)	Junior	F	5' 6" (1.68 m)		Great Falls, Montana	National Sports Academy
25		Cassie Clayton	Freshman	F	5' 6" (1.68 m)		Pickering, Ontario	Mississauga Jr. Chiefs
26		Kourtney Kunichika	Senior	F	5' 5" (1.65 m)		Fullerton, California	LA Selects
27		Jess Paton	Sophomore	F	5' 4" (1.63 m)		Woodstock, Ontario	Kitchener-Waterloo Rangers
28		Melissa Bromley (A)	Senior	D	5' 11" (1.8 m)		Aurora, Ontario	Aurora Panthers
34		Brooke Stoddart	Freshman	G	5' 6" (1.68 m)		Elmvale, Ontario	Brampton Thunder
35		Jetta Rackleff	Sophomore	G	5' 8" (1.73 m)		Bend, Oregon	Anaheim Lady Ducks
39		Ali Binnington	Junior	G	5' 9" (1.75 m)		Oakville, Ontario	Mississauga Jr. Chiefs

== Schedule ==
Date	Opponent^{#}	Rank^{#}	Site	Decision	Result	Record
Regular Season
September 28	at #3 Clarkson*		Cheel Arena • Potsdam, NY	Ali Binnington	L 1–12	0–1–0
October 4	at New Hampshire*		Whittemore Center • Durham, NH	Ali Binnington	W 3–2	1–1–0
October 5	at #10 Northeastern*		Matthews Arena • Boston, MA	Ali Binnington	L 4–5	1–2–0
October 11	Vermont*		Frank Ritter Memorial Ice Arena • Rochester, NY	Ali Binnington	W 6–0	2–2–0
October 12	Vermont*		Frank Ritter Memorial Ice Arena • Rochester, NY	Ali Binnington	L 2–5	2–3–0
October 18	Colgate*		Bill Gray's Regional Iceplex • Brighton, NY	Ali Binnington	W 2–2	3–3–0
October 19	Colgate*		Frank Ritter Memorial Ice Arena • Rochester, NY	Jetta Rackleff	L 1–2 ^{OT}	3–4–0
October 25	Brown*		Frank Ritter Memorial Ice Arena • Rochester, NY	Ali Binnington	W 2–1	4–4–0
October 26	Brown*		Frank Ritter Memorial Ice Arena • Rochester, NY	Brooke Stoddart	L 1–2 ^{OT}	4–5–0
November 8	at Lindenwood		Lindenwood Ice Arena • Wentzville, MO	Ali Binnington	W 3–0	5–5–0 (1–0–0)
November 9	at Lindenwood		Lindenwood Ice Arena • Wentzville, MO	Ali Binnington	T 1–1 ^{OT}	5–5–1 (1–0–1)
November 15	Penn State		Frank Ritter Memorial Ice Arena • Rochester, NY	Ali Binnington	W 2–1	6–5–1 (2–0–1)
November 16	Penn State		Frank Ritter Memorial Ice Arena • Rochester, NY	Ali Binnington	W 3–2	7–5–1 (3–0–1)
November 22	#10 Mercyhurst		Frank Ritter Memorial Ice Arena • Rochester, NY	Ali Binnington	W 2–1	8–5–1 (4–0–1)
November 23	#10 Mercyhurst		Frank Ritter Memorial Ice Arena • Rochester, NY	Ali Binnington	L 2–3	8–6–1 (4–1–1)
November 29	at #7 Quinnipiac*		TD Bank Sports Center • Hamden, CT (Nutmeg Classic, Opening Game)	Brooke Stoddart	L 0–8	8–7–1
November 30	vs. Connecticut*		TD Bank Sports Center • Hamden, CT (Nutmeg Classic, Consolation Game)	Jetta Rackleff	W 4–3 ^{OT}	9–7–1
December 6	at #10 Robert Morris		84 Lumber Arena • Neville Township, PA	Ali Binnington	L 1–2	9–8–1 (4–2–1)
December 7	at #10 Robert Morris		84 Lumber Arena • Neville Township, PA	Ali Binnington	L 2–4	9–9–1 (4–3–1)
December 14	#6 Clarkson*		Frontier Field • Rochester, NY	Ali Binnington	L 2–6	9–10–1
January 3, 2014	at Union*		Achilles Center • Schenectady, NY	Ali Binnington	L 1–2 ^{OT}	9–11–1
January 4	at Union*		Achilles Center • Schenectady, NY	Ali Binnington	T 1–1 ^{OT}	9–11–2
January 10	Syracuse		Frank Ritter Memorial Ice Arena • Rochester, NY	Jetta Rackleff	W 4–3	10–11–2 (5–3–1)
January 17	at Syracuse		Tennity Ice Skating Pavilion • Syracuse, NY	Jetta Rackleff	L 4–5 ^{OT}	10–12–2 (5–4–1)
January 24	Lindenwood		Frank Ritter Memorial Ice Arena • Rochester, NY	Jetta Rackleff	W 4–3	11–12–2 (6–4–1)
January 25	Lindenwood		Frank Ritter Memorial Ice Arena • Rochester, NY	Ali Binnington	W 2–0	12–12–2 (7–4–1)
January 31	at Penn State		Pegula Ice Arena • University Park, PA	Brooke Stoddart	T 2–2 ^{OT}	12–12–3 (7–4–2)
February 1	at Penn State		Pegula Ice Arena • University Park, PA	Brooke Stoddart	W 3–1	13–12–3 (8–4–2)
February 7	at #10 Mercyhurst		Mercyhurst Ice Center • Erie, PA	Jetta Rackleff	L 1–5	13–13–3 (8–5–2)
February 8	at #10 Mercyhurst		Mercyhurst Ice Center • Erie, PA	Brooke Stoddart	L 2–5	13–14–3 (8–6–2)
February 14	#9 Robert Morris		Frank Ritter Memorial Ice Arena • Rochester, NY	Ali Binnington	L 1–2	13–15–3 (8–7–2)
February 15	#9 Robert Morris		Frank Ritter Memorial Ice Arena • Rochester, NY	Ali Binnington	W 1–0	14–15–3 (9–7–2)
February 21	Syracuse		Frank Ritter Memorial Ice Arena • Rochester, NY	Ali Binnington	W 3–1	15–15–3 (10–7–2)
February 22	at Syracuse		Tennity Ice Skating Pavilion • Syracuse, NY	Ali Binnington	W 2–1 ^{OT}	16–15–3 (11–7–2)
CHA Tournament
February 28	Penn State*		Frank Ritter Memorial Ice Arena • Rochester, NY (Quarterfinal, Game 1)	Ali Binnington	W 3–2 ^{OT}	17–15–3
March 1	Penn State*		Frank Ritter Memorial Ice Arena • Rochester, NY (Quarterfinal, Game 2)	Ali Binnington	W 3–0	18–15–5
March 7	vs. Robert Morris*		Mercyhurst Ice Center • Erie, PA (Semifinal Game)	Ali Binnington	W 4–1	19–15–3
March 8	at #8 Mercyhurst*		Mercyhurst Ice Center • Erie, PA (CHA Championship Game)	Ali Binnington	W 2–1 ^{2OT}	20–15–3
*Non-conference game. ^{#}Rankings from USCHO.com Poll.

== Awards and honors ==
Junior Ali Binnington was named the CHA Goaltender of the Year. Binnington went 14-9-2 with a 1.82 Goals Against Average, a .940 Save Percentage and six shutouts. Binnington was also the MVP of the CHA Tournament.

Junior captain Defender Lindsay Grigg was named to the All-CHA Second Team.
