= 2013–14 Clarkson Golden Knights women's ice hockey season =

NCAA National Collegiate Champions ECAC Hockey Regular Season Champions NCAA Championship Game, W 5–4 vs. Minnesota
- Conference: 1st ECAC
- Home ice: Cheel Arena

Rankings
- USCHO.com: #1
- USA Today/USA Hockey Magazine: #1

Record
- Overall: 31–5–5
- Home: 17–4–4
- Road: 11–1–1
- Neutral: 3–0–0

Coaches and captains
- Head coach: Shannon Desrosiers and Matt Desrosiers
- Assistant coaches: Matt Kelly
- Captain: Carly Mercer
- Alternate captain(s): Vanessa Gagnon; Jamie Lee Rattray

The Clarkson Golden Knights women's ice hockey program represented Clarkson University during the 2013–14 NCAA Division I women's ice hockey season.

One of the most unusual features of the regular season occurred on December 14, 2013, when the Golden Knights competed in an outdoor game against the RIT Tigers at Frontier Field in Rochester, New York. The Golden Knights prevailed by a 6–2 tally.

The Golden Knights finished the regular season by winning the ECAC Hockey regular season championship, the team's first title of any kind. Despite losing the conference tournament in the championship game, the Golden Knights still earned an NCAA tournament bid. In the NCAA tournament, the Golden Knights advanced to the national championship game, where they won their first-ever national championship with a 5–4 triumph over the Minnesota Golden Gophers in the championship game. Of note, it was the first national championship in the history of Clarkson athletics. Also, Clarkson was the first top-level NCAA women's hockey champion from a conference other than the Western Collegiate Hockey Association. In addition to the team successes, Golden Knights senior Jamie Lee Rattray also became the first player in program history to win the Patty Kazmaier Award.

== Offseason ==
=== Recruiting ===
Player	Position	Nationality	Notes
Genevieve Bannon	Forward	Canada	Played at Ontario Hockey Academy
Jessica Gillham	Forward	Canada	Competed with the PWHL’s Aurora Panthers club
Corie Jacobson	Defense	Canada	Member of North Bay Ice Boltz
McKenzie Johnson	Goaltender	United States	Competed at Eden Prairie High School in Minnesota

== Schedule ==
Date	Opponent^{#}	Rank^{#}	Site	Decision	Result	Record
Regular Season
September 28	RIT*	#3	Cheel Arena • Potsdam, NY	Erica Howe	W 12–1	1–0–0
October 4	St. Lawrence*	#3	Cheel Arena • Potsdam, NY	Erica Howe	W 5–2	2–0–0
October 5	at St. Lawrence*	#3	Appleton Arena • Canton, NY	Erica Howe	W 4–1	3–0–0
October 11	at Syracuse*	#3	Tennity Ice Skating Pavilion • Syracuse, NY	Erica Howe	W 2–1	4–0–0
October 12	Syracuse*	#3	Cheel Arena • Potsdam, NY	Erica Howe	W 4–0	5–0–0
October 18	Mercyhurst*	#3	Cheel Arena • Potsdam, NY	Erica Howe	L 0–2	5–1–0
October 19	Mercyhurst*	#3	Cheel Arena • Potsdam, NY	Erica Howe	T 1–1 ^{OT}	5–1–1
October 25	at #3 Cornell	#5	Lynah Rink • Ithaca, NY	Erica Howe	L 3–6	5–2–1 (0–1–0)
October 26	at Colgate	#5	Starr Arena • Hamilton, NY	Erica Howe	W 2–0	6–2–1 (1–1–0)
November 1	Brown	#5	Cheel Arena • Potsdam, NY	Erica Howe	T 1–1 ^{OT}	6–2–2 (1–1–1)
November 2	Yale	#5	Cheel Arena • Potsdam, NY	Erica Howe	W 7–0	7–2–2 (2–1–1)
November 8	Dartmouth	#6	Cheel Arena • Potsdam, NY	Erica Howe	W 3–0	8–2–2 (3–1–1)
November 9	#8 Harvard	#6	Cheel Arena • Potsdam, NY	Erica Howe	L 0–2	8–3–2 (3–2–1)
November 15	Providence*	#9	Cheel Arena • Potsdam, NY	Erica Howe	W 5–1	9–3–2
November 16	Providence*	#9	Cheel Arena • Potsdam, NY	Erica Howe	W 4–0	10–3–2
November 22	at Princeton	#8	Hobey Baker Memorial Rink • Princeton, NJ	Erica Howe	W 7–0	11–3–2 (4–2–1)
November 23	at #5 Quinnipiac	#8	TD Bank Sports Center • Hamden, CT	Erica Howe	W 3–0	12–3–1 (5–2–1)
December 6	#4 North Dakota*	#6	Cheel Arena • Potsdam, NY	Erica Howe	L 1–2	12–4–2
December 7	#4 North Dakota*	#6	Cheel Arena • Potsdam, NY	Erica Howe	W 2–1	13–4–2
December 14	vs. RIT*	#6	Frontier Field • Rochester, NY (Frozen Frontier)	Erica Howe	W 6–2	14–4–2
January 3	McGill*	#6	Cheel Arena • Potsdam, NY (exhibition)	Jenna Boss	W 7–0	14–4–2
January 10	at St. Lawrence	#6	Appleton Arena • Canton, NY	Erica Howe	W 6–0	15–4–2 (6–2–1)
January 11	St. Lawrence	#6	Cheel Arena • Potsdam, NY	Erica Howe	W 3–0	16–4–2 (7–2–1)
January 17	at Yale	#5	Ingalls Rink • New Haven, CT	Erica Howe	T 3–3 ^{OT}	16–4–3 (7–2–2)
January 18	at Brown	#5	Meehan Auditorium • Providence, RI	Erica Howe	W 4–1	17–4–3 (8–2–2)
January 24	Colgate	#6	Cheel Arena • Potsdam, NY	Erica Howe	W 5–2	18–4–3 (9–2–2)
January 25	#4 Cornell	#6	Cheel Arena • Potsdam, NY	Erica Howe	W 3–1	19–4–3 (10–2–2)
January 31	at Union	#4	Achilles Rink • Schenectady, NY	Erica Howe	W 5–0	20–4–3 (11–2–2)
February 1	at RPI	#4	Houston Field House • Troy, NY	Erica Howe	W 5–1	21–4–3 (12–2–2)
February 7	#8 Quinnipiac	#3	Cheel Arena • Potsdam, NY	Erica Howe	T 3–3 ^{OT}	21–4–4 (12–2–3)
February 8	Princeton	#3	Cheel Arena • Potsdam, NY	Erica Howe	T 2–2 ^{OT}	21–4–5 (12–2–4)
February 14	at #6 Harvard	#5	Bright-Landry Hockey Center • Allston, MA	Erica Howe	W 2–1	22–4–5 (13–2–4)
February 15	at Dartmouth	#5	Thompson Arena • Hanover, NH	Erica Howe	W 6–1	23–4–5 (14–2–4)
February 21	RPI	#4	Cheel Arena • Potsdam, NY	Erica Howe	W 6–0	24–4–5 (15–2–4)
February 22	Union	#4	Cheel Arena • Potsdam, NY	Erica Howe	W 2–1 ^{OT}	25–4–5 (16–2–4)
ECAC Hockey Tournament
February 28	Dartmouth*	#3	Cheel Arena • Potsdam, NY (Quarterfinals Game 1)	Erica Howe	W 2–0	26–4–5
March 1	Dartmouth*	#3	Cheel Arena • Potsdam, NY (Quarterfinals Game 2)	Erica Howe	W 2–0	27–4–5
March 8	#7 Quinnipiac*	#3	Cheel Arena • Potsdam, NY (Semifinals)	Erica Howe	W 6–0	28–4–5
March 9	#5 Cornell*	#3	Cheel Arena • Potsdam, NY (Championship)	Erica Howe	L 0–1	28–5–5
NCAA Tournament
March 15	#5 Boston College*	#4	Cheel Arena • Potsdam, NY (Quarterfinals)	Erica Howe	W 3–1	29–5–5
March 21	vs. #7 Mercyhurst*	#4	TD Bank Sports Center • Hamden, CT (Semifinals)	Erica Howe	W 5–1	30–5–5
March 23	vs. #1 Minnesota*	#4	TD Bank Sports Center • Hamden, CT (Championship)	Erica Howe	W 5–4	31–5–5
*Non-conference game. ^{#}Rankings from USCHO.com Poll.

== Awards and honors ==
- Erin Ambrose – Patty Kazmaier Memorial Award Top 10, First Team AHCA All-American, First Team All-USCHO.com, ECAC Hockey First Team All-Star, co-ECAC Hockey Best Defensive Defenseman, ECAC Hockey Player of the Week (10/8), ECAC Hockey Preseason All-League Team
- Genevieve Bannon – ECAC Hockey Rookie of the Year finalist, ECAC Hockey Rookie of the Week (12/17, 1/14, 2/17), ECAC Hockey weekly Honor Roll (10/8, 10/15, 11/19, 1/21)
- Renata Fast – NCAA All-Tournament Team
- Vanessa Gagnon – NCAA Elite 89, Sarah Devens Award, Mandi Schwartz Student-Athlete of the Year, ECAC Hockey Best Defensive Forward
- Jessica Gillham – ECAC Hockey weekly Honor Roll (11/12)
- Erica Howe – NCAA All-Tournament Team, Second Team All-USCHO.com, ECAC Hockey Second Team All-Star, ECAC Hockey Goaltender of the Year finalist, ECAC Hockey Goaltender of the Month (November, January, February), ECAC Hockey Goaltender of the Week (10/15, 11/26, 1/14, 2/17), ECAC Hockey weekly Honor Roll (10/8, 10/22, 10/29, 11/5, 11/12, 11/19, 12/10, 12/17, 1/21, 1/26, 2/2), ECAC Hockey Preseason All-League Team
- Corie Jacobson – ECAC Hockey weekly Honor Roll (11/5, 11/26)
- Christine Lambert – ECAC Hockey Player of the Week (11/19)
- Shannon MacAulay – ECAC Hockey All-Tournament Team, ECAC Hockey weekly Honor Roll (2/17)
- Carly Mercer – ECAC Hockey Second Team All-Star, ECAC Hockey Player of the Week (10/15), ECAC Hockey weekly Honor Roll (12/17)
- Jamie Lee Rattray – Patty Kazmaier Memorial Award winner, USCHO.com Player of the Year, NCAA Tournament Most Outstanding Player, NCAA All-Tournament Team, First Team AHCA All-American, First Team All-USCHO.com, ECAC Hockey Player of the Year, ECAC Hockey First Team All-Star, ECAC Hockey Player of the Month (November, December), ECAC Hockey Player of the Week (11/26, 1/26, 2/2), ECAC Hockey weekly Honor Roll (10/29, 11/5, 12/10, 1/14, 1/21), ECAC Hockey Preseason All-League Team
- Brittany Styner – ECAC Hockey Second Team All-Star, ECAC Hockey weekly Honor Roll (2/10)
- Shannon Desrosiers and Matt Desrosiers – USCHO.com Coaches of the Year, ECAC Hockey Coaches of the Year
