= Sertich =

Sertich is a surname. Notable people with the surname include:

- Andy Sertich (born 1983), American-Croatian ice hockey player
- Marty Sertich (born 1982), American ice hockey player
- Mike Sertich (1921–2020), American ice hockey coach
- Steve Sertich (born 1952), American ice hockey player
- Tony Sertich (born 1976), American politician
