= 2013–14 Mercyhurst Lakers women's ice hockey season =

CHA Hockey Regular Season Champions NCAA Frozen Four, L, 1-5 vs. Clarkson Golden Knights
- Conference: 1st CHA
- Home ice: Mercyhurst Ice Center

Record
- Overall: 24-9-4
- Conference: 15-3-2
- Home: 12-4-3
- Road: 12-4-1
- Neutral: 0-1-0

Coaches and captains
- Head coach: Michael Sisti (15th season)
- Assistant coaches: Louis Goulet; Delaney Collins
- Captain: Christine Bestland
- Alternate captain(s): Shelby Bram; Molly Byrne; Christie Cicero; Caroline Luczak

The Mercyhurst Lakers women's ice hockey program represented Mercyhurst University during the 2013–14 NCAA Division I women's ice hockey season. Their conference mark was 15-3-2, earning them the College Hockey America regular season title. In the postseason, the Lakers were defeated 2-1 in overtime by the RIT Tigers during the CHA championship tournament. The Lakers would qualify for the NCAA Tournament. In the quarterfinals, the Lakers defeated Cornell by a 3–2 mark in Ithaca, New York. Advancing to the Frozen Four in Hamden, Connecticut, the Lakers were bested by the eventual national champion Golden Knights.

== Standings ==
2013–14 College Hockey America standings
	Conference record							Overall record					
	GP	W	L	T	PTS	GF	GA	GP	W	L	T	GF	GA
#6 Mercyhurst^{†}	20	15	3	2	32	77	31	33	24	9	4	123	70
Robert Morris	20	13	5	2	28	57	33	35	25	8	4	100	59
RIT*	20	11	7	2	24	51	44	38	20	15	3	87	95
Syracuse	20	9	8	3	21	61	46	37	20	14	3	99	75
Lindenwood	20	5	13	2	12	35	72	34	5	26	3	46	121
Penn State	20	1	18	1	3	26	79	38	6	29	3	49	130
Championship: Mercyhurst † indicates conference regular season champion; * indicates conference tournament champion Final rankings: USCHO.com Poll

== Offseason ==
=== Recruiting ===
Player	Position	Nationality	Notes
Taylor Accursi	Forward	Canada	Competed on Canada’s National Under-18 Team
Megan Whiddon	Forward	United States	Graduated from National Sports Academy; Grew up in California
Paige Horton	Defense	Canada	Member of PWHL’s London Jr. Devilettes; Tallest member of the team at 5-11
Jillian Skinner	Defense	Canada	Played for the Mississauga Jr. Chiefs

== Roster ==
=== 2013–14 Lakers ===
No.	Nat.	Player	Class	Pos	Height	DoB	Hometown	Previous team
4		Emily Janiga	Sophomore	F	5' 10" (1.78 m)		East Aurora, New York	Nichols School
5		Molly Byrne (A)	Junior	D	5' 9" (1.75 m)		Plymouth, Minnesota	Shattuck-St. Mary's
6		Taylor Accursi	Freshman	F	5' 8" (1.73 m)		Ancaster, Ontario	Burlington Barracudas
7		Hannah Bale	Sophomore	F	5' 11" (1.8 m)		Oakville, Ontario	Stoney Creek Jr. Sabres
8		Kaleigh Chippy	Senior	F	5' 10" (1.78 m)		Cleveland, Ohio	Niagara University
10		Megan Whiddon	Freshman	F	5' 5" (1.65 m)		Corona, California	National Sports Academy
13		Shelby Bram (A)	Junior	F	5' 3" (1.6 m)		Ste. Anne, Manitoba	Eastman Selects
14		Maggie Rothgery	Junior	F	5' 7" (1.7 m)		Elyria, Ohio	Ohio Flames
15		Paige Horton	Freshman	D	5' 11" (1.8 m)		St. Thomas, Ontario	London Jr. Devilettes
16		Jenna Dingeldein	Sophomore	F	6' 1" (1.85 m)		Toronto, Ontario	Toronto Aeros
18		J'nai Mahadeo	Sophomore	D	5' 8" (1.73 m)		Airdrie, Alberta	Edge School
20		Kathy Donohue	Sophomore	F	5' 5" (1.65 m)		Rochester, New York	North American Hockey Academy
21		Christie Cicero (A)	Senior	F	5' 4" (1.63 m)		Manalapan, New Jersey	New Jersey Rockets
24		Jaclyn Arbour	Sophomore	F	5' 9" (1.75 m)		South Setauket, New York	National Sports Academy
25		Jillian Skinner	Freshman	D	5' 6" (1.68 m)		Markham, Ontario	Mississauga Jr. Chiefs
26		Caroline Luczak (A)	Junior	D	5' 10" (1.78 m)		Midhurst, Ontario	Toronto Jr. Aeros
27		Christine Bestland (C)	Senior	F	5' 9" (1.75 m)		Brunkild, Manitoba	Pursuit of Excellence
28		Lauren Kilroy	Sophomore	D	5' 7" (1.7 m)		Cypress, California	North American Hockey Academy
29		Julia DiTondo	Sophomore	G	5' 10" (1.78 m)		Kenmore, New York	Nichols School
34		Amanda Makela	Junior	G	5' 9" (1.75 m)		Thunder Bay, Ontario	Thunder Bay Queens

== Exhibition ==
Date	Opponent	League	Final Score
September 21	Western Mustangs	CIS	6-2, Mercyhurst
September 22	Whitby Wolves	PWHL	9-1, Mercyhurst

== Schedule ==
Date	Opponent^{#}	Rank^{#}	Site	Decision	Result	Record
Regular Season
September 27	at Minnesota State*	#7	All Seasons Arena • Mankato, MN	Amanda Makela	L 2–4	0–1–0
September 28	at Minnesota State*	#7	All Seasons Arena • Mankato, MN	Amanda Makela	W 3–2	1–1–0
October 5	Ohio State*	#7	Mercyhurst Ice Center • Erie, PA	Amanda Makela	L 3–4 ^{OT}	1–2–0
October 12	at Providence*	#10	Schneider Arena • Providence, RI	Amanda Makela	W 5–0	2–2–0
October 13	at Providence*	#10	Schneider Arena • Providence, RI	Amanda Makela	L 2–3	2–3–0
October 18	at #3 Clarkson*	#9	Cheel Arena • Potsdam, NY	Amanda Makela	W 2–0	3–3–0
October 19	at #3 Clarkson*	#9	Cheel Arena • Potsdam, NY	Amanda Makela	T 1–1 ^{OT}	3–3–1
October 25	Maine*	#8	Mercyhurst Ice Center • Erie, PA	Amanda Makela	W 2–1	4–3–1
October 26	Maine*	#8	Mercyhurst Ice Center • Erie, PA	Amanda Makela	W 5–0	5–3–1
November 8	at Robert Morris	#9	Colonials Arena • Neville Township, PA	Amanda Makela	W 2–0	6–3–1 (1–0–0)
November 9	at Robert Morris	#9	Colonials Arena • Neville Township, PA	Amanda Makela	L 2–3	6–4–1 (1–1–0)
November 15	Syracuse	#10	Mercyhurst Ice Center • Erie, PA	Amanda Makela	T 3–3 ^{OT}	6–4–2 (1–1–1)
November 16	Syracuse	#10	Mercyhurst Ice Center • Erie, PA	Amanda Makela	W 5–3	7–4–2 (2–1–1)
November 22	at RIT	#10	Frank Ritter Memorial Ice Arena • Rochester, NY	Amanda Makela	L 1–2	7–5–2 (2–2–1)
November 23	at RIT	#10	Frank Ritter Memorial Ice Arena • Rochester, NY	Julia DiTondo	W 3–2	8–5–2 (3–2–1)
November 26	St. Lawrence*		Mercyhurst Ice Center • Erie, PA	Amanda Makela	W 3–2	9–5–2
November 27	St. Lawrence*		Mercyhurst Ice Center • Erie, PA	Amanda Makela	W 3–2	10–5–2
December 6	Penn State		Mercyhurst Ice Center • Erie, PA	Amanda Makela	W 7–0	11–5–2 (4–2–1)
December 7	Penn State		Mercyhurst Ice Center • Erie, PA	Julia DiTondo	W 8–0	12–5–2 (5–2–1)
December 14	at Lindenwood		Lindenwood Ice Arena • Wentzville, MO	Amanda Makela	W 7–1	13–5–2 (6–2–1)
December 15	at Lindenwood		Lindenwood Ice Arena • Wentzville, MO	Amanda Makela	W 4–1	14–5–2 (7–2–1)
January 10, 2014	#3 Cornell*		Mercyhurst Ice Center • Erie, PA	Amanda Makela	T 4–4 ^{OT}	14–5–3
January 11	#3 Cornell*		Mercyhurst Ice Center • Erie, PA	Amanda Makela	L 4–6	14–6–3
January 24	#8 Robert Morris		Mercyhurst Ice Center • Erie, PA	Julia DiTondo	L 1–3	14–7–3 (7–3–1)
January 25	#8 Robert Morris		Mercyhurst Ice Center • Erie, PA	Amanda Makela	W 5–3	15–7–3 (8–3–1)
January 31	at Syracuse	#10	Tennity Ice Skating Pavilion • Syracuse, NY	Amanda Makela	W 3–2	16–7–3 (9–3–1)
February 1	at Syracuse	#10	Tennity Ice Skating Pavilion • Syracuse, NY	Amanda Makela	W 3–1	17–7–3 (10–3–1)
February 7	RIT	#10	Mercyhurst Ice Center • Erie, PA	Amanda Makela	W 5–1	18–7–3 (11–3–1)
February 8	RIT	#10	Mercyhurst Ice Center • Erie, PA	Amanda Makela	W 5–2	19–7–3 (12–3–1)
February 15	at Penn State	#8	Pegula Ice Arena • University Park, PA	Amanda Makela	W 4–0	20–7–3 (13–3–1)
February 16	at Penn State	#8	Pegula Ice Arena • University Park, PA	Amanda Makela	W 4–1	21–7–3 (14–3–1)
February 21	Lindenwood	#8	Mercyhurst Ice Center • Erie, PA	Amanda Makela	W 4–1	22–7–3 (15–3–1)
February 22	Lindenwood	#8	Mercyhurst Ice Center • Erie, PA	Amanda Makela	T 2–2 ^{OT}	22–7–4 (15–3–2)
CHA Tournament
March 7	Syracuse*	#8	Mercyhurst Ice Center • Erie, PA (Semifinal Game)	Amanda Makela	W 2–1	23–7–4
March 8	RIT*	#8	Mercyhurst Ice Center • Erie, PA (Championship Game)	Amanda Makela	L 1–2 ^{2OT}	23–8–4
NCAA Tournament
March 15	at #2 Cornell*	#7	Lynah Rink • Ithaca, NY (Quarterfinal Game)	Amanda Makela	W 3–2	24–8–4
March 21	vs. #2 Clarkson*	#3	TD Bank Sports Center • Hamden, CT (Frozen Four- Semifinal Game)	Amanda Makela	L 1–5	24–9–4
*Non-conference game. ^{#}Rankings from USCHO.com Poll.

== News and notes ==
On December 7, 2013, Bestland logged the 200th point of her NCAA career in an 8-0 victory against Penn State.

== Awards and honors ==
- Christine Bestland, Top Ten Finalist, Patty Kazmaier Award
- Christine Bestland, Mercyhurst Senior Female Student-Athlete of the Year
- Christine Bestland, CHA Player of the Month, March 2014
