= 2014–15 Minnesota Golden Gophers women's ice hockey season =

Collegiate women's ice hockey team season

WCHA Regular Season Champions Frozen Four Champions NCAA National Champions, Won Final 4–1 vs. Harvard Crimson March 22, 2015
- Conference: 1st WCHA
- Home ice: Ridder Arena

Rankings
- USCHO.com: 1
- USA Today/USA Hockey Magazine: 1

Record
- Overall: 34–3–4
- Home: 19–1–3
- Road: 14–1–1
- Neutral: 1–1–0

Coaches and captains
- Head coach: Brad Frost
- Assistant coaches: Nadine Muzerall; Joel Johnson; Andy Kent
- Captain(s): Rachael Bona; Rachel Ramsey
- Alternate captain(s): Meghan Lorence; Lee Stecklein

The 2014–15 Minnesota Golden Gophers women's ice hockey season represented the University of Minnesota during the 2014–15 NCAA Division I women's ice hockey season. They were coached by Brad Frost in his eighth season. The Golden Gophers advanced to the Frozen Four championship game for the fourth consecutive year and defeated Harvard 4–1 in the title game.

== Offseason ==
- August 5: Six members of the Gophers roster were invited to the 2014 USA Hockey Women's National Festival. Among the Gophers attending will include Rachael Bona, Hannah Brandt, Dani Cameranesi, Milica McMillen, Cara Piazza and Lee Stecklein. The six are looking for spots on the US Under-22 team which shall take on Team Canada from August 21–24 in Calgary, Alberta.

=== Recruiting ===
Player	Position	Nationality	Notes
Sydney Baldwin	Defense	United States	Played at Minnetonka High School
Kelly Pannek	Forward	United States	Attended Benilde-St. Margaret's
Cara Piazza	Forward	United States	Hails from Darien, Illinois
Nina Rodgers	Forward	United States	Played for Team USA U-18

== News and notes ==
- November 24: The Minnesota Golden Gophers and St. Cloud State Huskies faced off in the U.S. Hockey Hall of Fame Women’s Face-Off Classic. Golden Gophers freshman Kelly Pannek registered her first NCAA career hat trick as Minnesota prevailed by a 5–0 tally. Goaltender Amanda Leveille earned the shutout in a 19-save effort.

== Regular season ==
=== Standings ===
2014–15 Western Collegiate Hockey Association standings
	Conference record								Overall record					
	GP	W	L	T	SOW	PTS	GF	GA	GP	W	L	T	GF	GA
#1 Minnesota^{†}	28	22	2	4	2	72	116	36	41	34	3	4	184	48
#4 Wisconsin*	28	19	6	3	1	61	89	36	40	29	7	4	138	45
#8 North Dakota	28	16	9	3	2	53	67	43	37	22	12	3	97	59
Minnesota Duluth	28	14	10	4	2	48	68	56	37	20	12	5	98	70
#10 Bemidji State	28	13	14	1	1	41	58	57	39	21	17	1	86	70
Ohio State	28	12	13	3	1	40	60	61	36	17	16	3	82	76
St. Cloud State	28	5	22	1	1	17	28	98	37	8	28	1	45	127
Minnesota State	28	1	26	1	0	4	30	129	36	3	32	1	42	160
Championship: Wisconsin † indicates conference regular season champion; * indicates conference tournament champion Final rankings: USCHO.com

=== Schedule ===
Date	Time	Opponent^{#}	Rank^{#}	Site	Decision	Result	Attendance	Record
Regular Season
October 3	7:07	Penn State*	#1	Ridder Arena • Minneapolis, MN	Sidney Peters	W 8–0	2,155	1–0–0
October 4	7:07	#6 Boston University*	#1	Ridder Arena • Minneapolis, MN	Amanda Leveille	W 5–2	1,962	2–0–0
October 10	6:07	at Minnesota Duluth	#1	AMSOIL Arena • Duluth, MN	Leveille	W 3–0	1,061	3–0–0 (1–0–0)
October 11	6:07	at Minnesota Duluth	#1	AMSOIL Arena • Duluth, MN	Leveille	T 3–3 ^{OT}	1,303	3–0–1 (1–0–1)
October 17	7:07	at #1 Wisconsin	#2	LaBahn Arena • Madison, WI	Leveille	W 4–1	2,273	4–0–1 (2–0–1)
October 18	3:07	at #1 Wisconsin	#2	LaBahn Arena • Madison, WI	Leveille	W 2–1 ^{OT}	2,273	5–0–1 (3–0–1)
October 24	7:07	#9 North Dakota	#1	Ridder Arena • Minneapolis, MN	Leveille	W 5–2	1,647	6–0–1 (4–0–1)
October 25	4:07	#9 North Dakota	#1	Ridder Arena • Minneapolis, MN	Leveille	W 5–0	2,494	7–0–1 (5–0–1)
October 31	7:07	Bemidji State	#1	Ridder Arena • Minneapolis, MN	Peters	T 2–2 ^{OT}	1,105	7–0–2 (5–0–2)
November 1	4:07	Bemidji State	#1	Ridder Arena • Minneapolis, MN	Leveille	L 0–1	2,198	7–1–2 (5–1–2)
November 14	5:07	at Ohio State	#2	The Ohio State University Ice Rink • Columbus, OH	Leveille	W 4–2	328	8–1–2 (6–1–2)
November 15	1:07	at Ohio State	#2	The Ohio State University Ice Rink • Columbus, OH	Leveille	W 5–3	284	9–1–2 (7–1–2)
November 21	7:07	at Minnesota State	#2	All Seasons Arena • Mankato, MN	Leveille	W 5–1	230	10–1–2 (8–1–2)
November 22	4:07	Minnesota State	#2	Ridder Arena • Minneapolis, MN	Peters	W 4–0	2,499	11–1–2 (9–1–2)
November 24	7:00	vs. St. Cloud State*	#2	Braemar Ice Rink • Edina, MN (Women's Face-Off Classic)	Leveille	W 5–0	2,250	12–1–2
November 29	1:00	at Princeton*	#2	Hobey Baker Memorial Rink • Princeton, NJ	Leveille	W 2–1	223	13–1–2
November 30	1:00	at Princeton*	#2	Hobey Baker Memorial Rink • Princeton, NJ	Leveille	W 5–2	202	14–1–2
December 5	7:07	St. Cloud State	#2	Ridder Arena • Minneapolis, MN	Peters	W 12–0	1,521	15–1–2 (10–1–2)
December 6	4:07	St. Cloud State	#2	Ridder Arena • Minneapolis, MN	Leveille	W 7–0	1,672	16–1–2 (11–1–2)
January 4, 2015	4:07	St. Lawrence*	#2	Ridder Arena • Minneapolis, MN	Leveille	W 10–0	1,053	17–1–2
January 6	7:07	St. Lawrence*	#2	Ridder Arena • Minneapolis, MN	Leveille	W 5–1	850	18–1–2
January 10	4:30	#3 Wisconsin	#2	Ridder Arena • Minneapolis, MN	Leveille	W 4–1	2,441	19–1–2 (12–1–2)
January 11	2:07	#3 Wisconsin	#2	Ridder Arena • Minneapolis, MN	Leveille	T 1–1 ^{OT}	2,728	19–1–3 (12–1–3)
January 16	7:07	Minnesota State	#2	Ridder Arena • Minneapolis, MN	Peters	W 7–3	1,714	20–1–3 (13–1–3)
January 17	4:07	at Minnesota State	#2	All Seasons Arena • Mankato, MN	Leveille	W 7–1	207	21–1–3 (14–1–3)
January 23	3:07	at St. Cloud State	#2	Herb Brooks National Hockey Center • St. Cloud, MN	Shyler Sletta	W 4–0	355	22–1–3 (15–1–3)
January 24	3:07	at St. Cloud State	#2	Herb Brooks National Hockey Center • St. Cloud, MN	Leveille	W 7–1	455	23–1–3 (16–1–3)
January 30	7:07	Ohio State	#2	Ridder Arena • Minneapolis, MN	Leveille	T 3–3 ^{OT}	2,340	23–1–4 (16–1–4)
January 31	2:07	Ohio State	#2	Ridder Arena • Minneapolis, MN	Leveille	W 3–1	2,032	24–1–4 (17–1–4)
February 6	7:07	at North Dakota	#2	Ralph Engelstad Arena • Grand Forks, ND	Leveille	L 0–3	4,818	24–2–4 (17–2–4)
February 7	4:07	at North Dakota	#2	Ralph Engelstad Arena • Grand Forks, ND	Leveille	W 3–1	1,879	25–2–4 (18–2–4)
February 13	7:07	#6 Minnesota Duluth	#2	Ridder Arena • Minneapolis, MN	Leveille	W 7–1	2,588	26–2–4 (19–2–4)
February 14	4:07	#6 Minnesota Duluth	#2	Ridder Arena • Minneapolis, MN	Leveille	W 2–0	2,730	27–2–4 (20–2–4)
February 20	2:07	at Bemidji State	#2	Sanford Center • Bemidji, MN	Leveille	W 3–2	393	28–2–4 (21–2–4)
February 21	2:07	at Bemidji State	#2	Sanford Center • Bemidji, MN	Peters	W 4–2	540	29–2–4 (22–2–4)
WCHA Tournament
February 27	7:07	Minnesota State*	#2	Ridder Arena • Minneapolis, MN (Quarterfinals, Game 1)	Leveille	W 10–0	1,131	30–2–4
February 28	4:07	Minnesota State*	#2	Ridder Arena • Minneapolis, MN (Quarterfinals, Game 2)	Leveille	W 5–1	1,406	31–2–4
March 7	2:00	vs. #10 Bemidji State*	#2	Ralph Engelstad Arena • Grand Forks, ND (Semifinal Game)	Leveille	L 0–1	1,059	31–3–4
NCAA Tournament
March 14	4:00	RIT*	#2	Ridder Arena • Minneapolis, MN (Quarterfinal Game)	Leveille	W 6–2	1,796	32–3–4
March 20	5:00	#3 Wisconsin*	#2	Ridder Arena • Minneapolis, MN (Semifinal Game; Frozen Four)	Leveille	W 3–1	3,400	33–3–4
March 22	3:00	#4 Harvard*	#2	Ridder Arena • Minneapolis, MN (National Championship Game)	Leveille	W 4–1	3,400	34–3–4
*Non-conference game. ^{#}Rankings from USCHO.com Poll.

=== Roster ===
No.	Nat.	Player	Class	Pos	Height	DoB	Hometown	Previous team
2		Lee Stecklein (A)	Sophomore	D	6' 0" (1.83 m)	1994-04-23	Roseville, Minnesota	Roseville Area High School
3		Kate Flug	Sophomore	F	5' 8" (1.73 m)	1995-02-15	Roseville, Minnesota	Roseville Area High School
5		Rachel Ramsey (C)	Senior	D	6' 0" (1.83 m)	1992-10-14	Chanhassen, Minnesota	Minnetonka High School
6		Kate Schipper	Sophomore	F	5' 4" (1.63 m)	1995-06-28	Brooklyn Park, Minnesota	Breck School
7		Rachael Bona (C)	Senior	F	5' 5" (1.65 m)	1992-10-25	Coon Rapids, Minnesota	Coon Rapids High School
9		Sydney Baldwin	Freshman	D	5' 7" (1.7 m)	1996-01-15	Minnetonka, Minnesota	Minnetonka High School
10		Cara Piazza	Freshman	F	5' 7" (1.7 m)	1995-10-09	Darien, Illinois	Downers Grove South High School
11		Kelsey Cline	Sophomore	D/F	5' 6" (1.68 m)	1995-02-28	Bloomington, Minnesota	Bloomington Jefferson High School
12		Megan Wolfe	Sophomore	D	5' 8" (1.73 m)	1995-06-08	Eagan, Minnesota	Eagan High School
13		Milica McMillen	Junior	D	5' 10" (1.78 m)	1993-07-13	Saint Paul, Minnesota	Breck School
14		Maryanne Menefee	Junior	F	5' 6" (1.68 m)	1994-01-30	Lansing, Michigan	Lansing Eastern High School
15		Paige Haley	Sophomore	D/F	5' 9" (1.75 m)	1995-07-21	Red Wing, Minnesota	Red Wing High School
18		Brook Garzone	Junior	D/F	5' 6" (1.68 m)	1993-04-29	Sand Springs, Oklahoma	Shattuck-Saint Mary's
19		Kelly Pannek	Freshman	F	5' 8" (1.73 m)	1995-12-29	Plymouth, Minnesota	Benilde-St. Margaret's
20		Meghan Lorence (A)	Senior	F	5' 7" (1.7 m)	1992-06-25	Mounds View, Minnesota	Irondale High School
21		Dani Cameranesi	Sophomore	F	5' 5" (1.65 m)	1995-06-30	Plymouth, Minnesota	Blake School
22		Hannah Brandt	Junior	F	5' 6" (1.68 m)	1993-11-27	Vadnais Heights, Minnesota	Hill-Murray School
27		Nina Rodgers	Freshman	F	5' 5" (1.65 m)	1996-04-08	Minnetonka, Minnesota	Hopkins High School
29		Amanda Leveille	Junior	G	5' 7" (1.7 m)	1994-06-10	Kingston, Ontario	Frontenac Secondary School
31		Shyler Sletta	Senior	G	5' 5" (1.65 m)	1993-05-22	Elko New Market, Minnesota	New Prague High School
37		Sidney Peters	Freshman (RS)	G	5' 10" (1.78 m)	1995-02-26	Geneva, Illinois	North American Hockey Academy

== Awards and honors ==
- Sydney Baldwin, 2015 WCHA All-Rookie Team
- Rachael Bona, 2015 All-WCHA Third Team
- Hannah Brandt, Patty Kazmaier Award Top-3 Finalist
- Hannah Brandt, 2015 WCHA Player of the Year
- Hannah Brandt, 2015 WCHA Scoring Champion
- Hannah Brandt, 2015 All-WCHA First Team
- Hannah Brandt, 2015 All-WCHA First Team
- Dani Cameranesi, 2015 All-WCHA First Team
- Milica McMillen, 2015 All-WCHA Second Team
- Kelly Pannek, 2015 WCHA All-Rookie Team
- Rachel Ramsey, 2015 WCHA Defensive Player of the Year
- Rachel Ramsey, 2015 All-WCHA First Team
- Lee Stecklein, 2015 All-WCHA First Team

=== WCHA Weekly Honors ===
- Dani Cameranesi, WCHA Offensive Player of the Week (Week of November 25, 2014)
- Dani Cameranesi, WCHA Offensive Player of the Week, (Week of February 17, 2015)
- Dani Cameranesi, WCHA Offensive Player of the Week, (Week of February 24, 2015)
- Meghan Lorence, WCHA Offensive Player of the Week (Week of November 18, 2014)
- Kelly Pannek, WCHA Rookie of the Week (Week of November 25, 2014)
