= List of UConn Huskies women's ice hockey seasons =

This is a list of seasons completed by the UConn Huskies women's ice hockey team, representing the University of Connecticut. The list documents the season-by-season records of the Huskies from 2000 to present, including postseason records, and league awards for individual players or head coaches.

UConn has claimed two regular season Hockey East titles and two Tournament championships. They have made two appearances in the NCAA women's ice hockey tournament. The Huskies began Division I play in as an independent for one season, before joining ECAC Hockey for one season. UConn became a charter member of Hockey East in 2002.

NCAA Tournament Appearances	Conference regular season champions	Conference Playoff Champions

Season	Head coach	Conference	Season results									Conference tournament result	Postseason result
Season	Head coach	Conference	Overall				Conference					Conference tournament result	Postseason result
Season	Head coach	Conference	Wins	Losses	Ties	%	Wins	Losses	Ties	Pts	Finish (Members)	Conference tournament result	Postseason result
2000–01	Heather Linstad	Independent	3	10	0	.231	—	—	—	—	—	—	—
2001–02	Heather Linstad	ECAC Hockey	11	21	3	.357	7	12	2			Quarterfinals	—
2002–03	Heather Linstad	Hockey East	11	20	4	.371	3	9	3	9	T-4th (6)	Semifinals	—
2003–04	Heather Linstad	Hockey East	9	19	6	.353	3	11	4	14	5th (6)	—	—
2004–05	Heather Linstad	Hockey East	16	12	8	.556	11	5	4	26	3rd (6)	Finals	—
2005–06	Heather Linstad	Hockey East	12	21	1	.368	10	11	0	20	5th (8)	—	—
2006–07	Heather Linstad	Hockey East	17	15	3	.529	12	7	2	26	4th (8)	Semifinals	—
2007–08	Heather Linstad	Hockey East	22	8	5	.700	13	5	3	29	2nd (8)	Semifinals	—
2008–09	Heather Linstad	Hockey East	19	12	4	.600	10	8	3	25	T-4th (8)	Quarterfinals	—
2009–10	Heather Linstad	Hockey East	21	9	7	.662	10	5	6	27	5th (8)	Finals	—
2010–11	Heather Linstad	Hockey East	13	19	3	.414	9	9	3	21	4th (8)	Quarterfinals	—
2011–12	Heather Linstad	Hockey East	4	23	7	.221	3	15	3	9	7th (8)	—	—
2012–13	Heather Linstad	Hockey East	3	29	3	.129	1	19	1	3	8th (8)	Quarterfinals	—
2013–14	Chris MacKenzie	Hockey East	9	24	2	.286	6	13	1	13	T-5th (8)	Quarterfinals	—
2014–15	Chris MacKenzie	Hockey East	11	18	8	.405	5	11	5	15	5th (8)	Semifinals	—
2015–16	Chris MacKenzie	Hockey East	17	15	5	.527	11	10	3	25	4th (9)	Semifinals	—
2016–17	Chris MacKenzie	Hockey East	14	18	4	.444	9	13	2	20	7th (9)	Quarterfinals	—
2017–18	Chris MacKenzie	Hockey East	16	14	9	.526	7	11	6	20	7th (9)	Finals	—
2018–19	Chris MacKenzie	Hockey East	14	18	4	.444	9	14	4	22	7th (10)	Quarterfinals	—
2019–20	Chris MacKenzie	Hockey East	19	18	2	.513	13	12	2	28	5th (10)	Finals	—
2020–21	Chris MacKenzie	Hockey East	9	10	1	.475	8	9	1	50.40	7th (10)	Semifinals	—
2021–22	Chris MacKenzie	Hockey East	24	9	4	.703	16	7	4	.667	3rd (10)	Finals	—
2022–23	Chris MacKenzie	Hockey East	18	13	4	.571	12	11	4	44	5th (10)	Quarterfinals	—
2023–24	Chris MacKenzie	Hockey East	25	8	5	.724	19	4	4	61	1st (10)	Champions	First Round
2024–25	Chris MacKenzie	Hockey East	22	12	2	.639	19	6	2	58	1st (10)	Semifinals	—
2025–26	Chris MacKenzie	Hockey East	28	9	2	.744	17	6	1	53	2nd (10)	Champions	Quarterfinals
Totals			387	404	106	.491							
