= Jordyn Burns =

American former ice hockey player

Jordyn Burns (born September 29, 1992) is an American former professional ice hockey defender who most recently played for the Buffalo Beauts of the National Women's Hockey League in 2019.

Burns is from Chanhassen, Minnesota and played collegiately with the Syracuse Orange, transferring to the Minnesota Golden Gophers of the Western Collegiate Hockey Association after her freshman year. Burns participated in the 3rd NWHL All-Star Game.

== Career statistics ==
=== Regular season and playoffs ===
			Regular season					Playoffs
Season	Team	League	GP	G	A	Pts	PIM	GP	G	A	Pts	PIM
2011–12	Syracuse	CHA	35	2	8	10	12	—	—	—	—	—
2013–14	University of Minnesota	WCHA	21	2	2	4	0	—	—	—	—	—
2014–15	University of Minnesota	WCHA	41	2	3	5	0	—	—	—	—	—
2016–17	Buffalo Beauts	NWHL	15	0	2	2	2	2	0	0	0	0
2017–18	Buffalo Beauts	NWHL	15	0	2	2	4	2	0	0	0	0
2018–19	Buffalo Beauts	NWHL	5	0	1	1	0	2	0	0	0	0
NCAA totals			97	6	13	19	12	–	–	–	–	–
NWHL totals			35	0	5	5	6	6	0	0	0	0
