= 2013–14 Penn State Nittany Lions women's ice hockey season =

- Conference: 6th College Hockey America
- Home ice: Pegula Ice Arena

Record
- Overall: 4-29-3
- Conference: 1-18-1
- Home: 2-13-2
- Road: 2-16-1

Coaches and captains
- Head coach: Josh Brandwene (2nd season)
- Captain: Taylor Gross
- Alternate captain(s): Jordin Pardoski; Lindsay Reihl; Jenna Welch

The Penn State Nittany Lions women represented Penn State University in CHA women's ice hockey during the 2013-14 NCAA Division I women's ice hockey season. The Nittany Lions had a disappointing season, their second in Division I play.

== Standings ==
2013–14 College Hockey America standings
	Conference record							Overall record					
	GP	W	L	T	PTS	GF	GA	GP	W	L	T	GF	GA
#6 Mercyhurst^{†}	20	15	3	2	32	77	31	33	24	9	4	123	70
Robert Morris	20	13	5	2	28	57	33	35	25	8	4	100	59
RIT*	20	11	7	2	24	51	44	38	20	15	3	87	95
Syracuse	20	9	8	3	21	61	46	37	20	14	3	99	75
Lindenwood	20	5	13	2	12	35	72	34	5	26	3	46	121
Penn State	20	1	18	1	3	26	79	38	6	29	3	49	130
Championship: Mercyhurst † indicates conference regular season champion; * indicates conference tournament champion Final rankings: USCHO.com Poll

== Offseason ==
- The men and women's hockey teams move into the newly constructed Pegula Ice Arena.

== Roster ==
=== 2013–14 Nittany Lions ===
No.	Nat.	Player	Class	Pos	Height	DoB	Hometown	Previous team
2		Jeanette Bateman	Sophomore	D	5' 6" (1.68 m)		Greeley, Colorado	Colorado Select
3		Cara Mendelson	Junior	F	5' 6" (1.68 m)		Pittsburgh, Pennsylvania	Pittsburgh Penguins Elite
4		Jordin Pardoski (A)	Sophomore	D	5' 5" (1.65 m)		Rochester Hills, Michigan	Detroit Honeybaked
5		Stephanie Walkom	Sophomore	D	5' 7" (1.7 m)		Moon Township, Pennsylvania	Pittsburgh Penguins Elite
6		Lindsay Reihl (A)	Graduate	D	5' 4" (1.63 m)		Cheshire, Connecticut	Connecticut Polar Bears
9		Amy Petersen	Freshman	F	5' 4" (1.63 m)		Minnetonka, Minnesota	Minnetonka HS
10		Micayla Catanzariti	Sophomore	F	5' 4" (1.63 m)		Rancho Santa Margarita, California	Gilmour Academy
12		Sarah Nielsen	Freshman	F	5' 6" (1.68 m)		Edina, Minnesota	Edina HS
13		Kendra Rasmussen	Sophomore	F	5' 5" (1.65 m)		Sartell, Minnesota	Sartell/Sauk Rapids HS
14		Darby Kern	Sophomore	F	5' 11" (1.8 m)		Venetia, Pennsylvania	Pittsburgh Penguins Elite
15		Jess Desorcie	Junior	F	5' 4" (1.63 m)		Westford, Vermont	Taft School
16		Hannah Hoenshell	Sophomore	F	5' 3" (1.6 m)		Plano, Texas	Alliance Bulldogs
17		Paige Jahnke	Sophomore	D	5' 6" (1.68 m)		Oakdale, Minnesota	Roseville HS
18		Laura Bowman	Freshman	F	5' 7" (1.7 m)		Minnetonka, Minnesota	Minnetonka HS
19		Jill Holdcroft	Sophomore	F	5' 1" (1.55 m)		Pennsylvania Furnace, Pennsylvania	Pittsburgh Penguins Elite
20		Emily Laurenzi	Sophomore	F	5' 2" (1.57 m)		Townsend, Delaware	National Sports Academy
21		Sarah Wilkie	Sophomore	D	5' 6" (1.68 m)		Ashby, Massachusetts	Williston Northampton School
22		Jenna Welch (A)	Senior	F	5' 8" (1.73 m)		Austin, Texas	North American Hockey Academy
23		Birdie Shaw	Sophomore	F	5' 2" (1.57 m)		Troy, Michigan	Detroit Honeybaked
24		Taylor Gross (C)	Senior	F	5' 1" (1.55 m)		Colorado Springs, Colorado	UConn
25		Katie Murphy	Junior	F	5' 4" (1.63 m)		Novi, Michigan	Detroit Honeybaked
27		Kelly Seward	Freshman	D	5' 9" (1.75 m)		Williamsville, New York	Nichols School
30		Celine Whitlinger	Sophomore	G	5' 8" (1.73 m)		Garden Grove, California	Gilmour Academy
31		Brooke Meyer	Sophomore	G	5' 7" (1.7 m)		Naperville, Illinois	Neuqua Valley HS
33		Madison Smiddy	Junior	D	5' 7" (1.7 m)		Grand Rapids, Michigan	Detroit Honeybaked
36		Tess Weaver	Junior	F	5' 5" (1.65 m)		Windber, Pennsylvania	Pittsburgh Penguins Elite
37		Nicole Paniccia	Senior	G	5' 5" (1.65 m)		Oakville, Ontario	UConn
40		Shannon Yoxheimer	Sophomore	F	5' 7" (1.7 m)		Jackson, Michigan	North American Hockey Academy

== Schedule ==
Date	Opponent^{#}	Rank^{#}	Site	Decision	Result	Record
Regular Season
October 4	at Vermont*		Gutterson Fieldhouse • Burlington, Vermont	Nicole Pannicia	T 3–3 ^{OT}	0–0–1
October 5	at Vermont*		Gutterson Fieldhouse • Burlington, Vermont	Celine Whitlinger	W 4–2	1–0–1
October 11	at Quinnipiac*		TD Bank Sports Center • Hamden, Connecticut	Nicole Pannicia	L 1–5	1–1–1
October 12	at Quinnipiac*		TD Bank Sports Center • Hamden, Connecticut	Celine Whitlinger	L 0–4	1–2–1
October 18	Union*		Pegula Ice Arena • University Park, Pennsylvania	Nicole Pannicia	L 1–2	1–3–1
October 19	Union*		Pegula Ice Arena • University Park, Pennsylvania	Celine Whitlinger	W 2–1	2–3–1
October 26	New Hampshire*		Pegula Ice Arena • University Park, Pennsylvania	Nicole Pannicia	L 5–8	2–4–1
October 27	New Hampshire*		Pegula Ice Arena • University Park, Pennsylvania	Celine Whitlinger	L 1–3	2–5–1
October 31	Robert Morris		Pegula Ice Arena • University Park, Pennsylvania	Nicole Pannicia	L 0–4	2–6–1 (0–1–0)
November 1	Robert Morris		Pegula Ice Arena • University Park, Pennsylvania	Celine Whitlinger	L 0–6	2–7–1 (0–2–0)
November 9	Syracuse		Pegula Ice Arena • University Park, Pennsylvania	Nicole Pannicia	L 1–2	2–8–1 (0–3–0)
November 10	Syracuse		Pegula Ice Arena • University Park, Pennsylvania	Celine Whitlinger	L 3–4 ^{OT}	2–9–1 (0–4–0)
November 15	at RIT		Frank Ritter Memorial Ice Arena • Rochester, New York	Nicole Pannicia	L 1–2	2–10–1 (0–5–0)
November 16	at RIT		Frank Ritter Memorial Ice Arena • Rochester, New York	Celine Whitlinger	L 2–3	2–11–1 (0–6–0)
November 22	at Lindenwood		Lindenwood Ice Arena • Wentzville, Missouri	Nicole Pannicia	L 1–2	2–12–1 (0–7–0)
November 23	at Lindenwood		Lindenwood Ice Arena • Wentzville, Missouri	Celine Whitlinger	W 4–1	3–12–1 (1–7–0)
November 30	Maine*		Pegula Ice Arena • University Park, Pennsylvania	Nicole Pannicia	T 1–1 ^{OT}	3–12–2
December 6	at Mercyhurst		Mercyhurst Ice Center • Erie, Pennsylvania	Celine Whitlinger	L 0–7	3–13–2 (1–8–0)
December 7	at Mercyhurst		Mercyhurst Ice Center • Erie, Pennsylvania	Nicole Pannicia	L 0–8	3–14–2 (1–9–0)
January 3, 2014	at Ohio State*		OSU Ice Rink • Columbus, Ohio	Celine Whitlinger	L 0–8	3–15–2
January 4	at Ohio State*		OSU Ice Rink • Columbus, Ohio	Nicole Pannicia	L 0–4	3–16–2
January 10	Colgate*		Pegula Ice Arena • University Park, Pennsylvania	Celine Whitlinger	L 2–3 ^{OT}	3–17–2
January 11	Colgate*		Pegula Ice Arena • University Park, Pennsylvania	Nicole Pannicia	W 2–1 ^{OT}	4–17–2
January 24	at Syracuse		Tennity Ice Skating Pavilion • Syracuse, New York	Celine Whitlinger	L 2–3	4–18–2 (1–10–0)
January 25	at Syracuse		Tennity Ice Skating Pavilion • Syracuse, New York	Nicole Pannicia	L 0–3	4–19–2 (1–11–0)
January 28	at Princeton*		Hobey Baker Memorial Rink • Princeton, New Jersey	Nicole Pannicia	L 1–6	4–20–2
January 31	RIT		Pegula Ice Arena • University Park, Pennsylvania	Celine Whitlinger	T 2–2 ^{OT}	4–20–3 (1–11–1)
February 1	RIT		Pegula Ice Arena • University Park, Pennsylvania	Nicole Pannicia	L 1–3	4–21–3 (1–12–1)
February 8	Lindenwood		Pegula Ice Arena • University Park, Pennsylvania	Nicole Pannicia	L 1–2	4–22–3 (1–13–1)
February 9	Lindenwood		Pegula Ice Arena • University Park, Pennsylvania	Nicole Pannicia	L 3–4 ^{OT}	4–23–3 (1–14–1)
February 15	#8 Mercyhurst		Pegula Ice Arena • University Park, Pennsylvania	Celine Whitlinger	L 0–4	4–24–3 (1–15–1)
February 16	#8 Mercyhurst		Pegula Ice Arena • University Park, Pennsylvania	Nicole Pannicia	L 1–4	4–25–3 (1–16–1)
February 21	at Robert Morris		RMU Island Sports Center • Neville Township, Pennsylvania	Nicole Pannicia	L 2–5	4–26–3 (1–17–1)
February 22	at Robert Morris		RMU Island Sports Center • Neville Township, Pennsylvania	Nicole Pannicia	L 0–4	4–27–3 (1–18–1)
CHA Tournament
February 28	RIT*		Frank Ritter Ice Arena • Rochester, New York (Quarterfinal, Game 1)	Nicole Paniccia	L 2–3 ^{OT}	4–28–3
March 1	RIT*		Frank Ritter Ice Arena • Rochester, New York (Quarterfinal, Game 2)	Nicole Paniccia	L 0–3	4–29–3
*Non-conference game. ^{#}Rankings from USCHO.com Poll.

== Awards and honors ==
- Laura Bowman, Forward 2013–14 All-CHA Rookie Team
- Taylor Gross, CHA Sportsmanship Award
