= 2013–14 Robert Morris Colonials women's ice hockey season =

- Conference: 2nd College Hockey America
- Home ice: RMU Island Sports Center

Record
- Overall: 24–8–3
- Conference: 13–5–2
- Home: 14–4–1
- Road: 10–3–2
- Neutral: 0–1–0

Coaches and captains
- Head coach: Paul Colontino (3rd season)
- Assistant coaches: Logan Bittle; Jinelle Siergiej
- Captain: Kristen Richards
- Alternate captain(s): Brandi Pollock; Thea Imbrogno

The Robert Morris Colonials women represented Robert Morris University in CHA women's ice hockey during the 2013–14 NCAA Division I women's ice hockey season. The Colonials finished conference play in second place, and were eliminated in the first round of the CHA Tournament by RIT.

== Offseason ==
- April 11: Former Goaltender Brianne McLaughlin earned a gold medal with the US team at the IIHF World Championships.

== Standings ==
2013–14 College Hockey America standings
	Conference record							Overall record					
	GP	W	L	T	PTS	GF	GA	GP	W	L	T	GF	GA
#6 Mercyhurst^{†}	20	15	3	2	32	77	31	33	24	9	4	123	70
Robert Morris	20	13	5	2	28	57	33	35	25	8	4	100	59
RIT*	20	11	7	2	24	51	44	38	20	15	3	87	95
Syracuse	20	9	8	3	21	61	46	37	20	14	3	99	75
Lindenwood	20	5	13	2	12	35	72	34	5	26	3	46	121
Penn State	20	1	18	1	3	26	79	38	6	29	3	49	130
Championship: Mercyhurst † indicates conference regular season champion; * indicates conference tournament champion Final rankings: USCHO.com Poll

== Roster ==
=== 2013–14 Colonials ===
No.	Nat.	Player	Class	Pos	Height	DoB	Hometown	Previous team
1		Jessica Dodds	Freshman	G	5' 7" (1.7 m)		London, Ontario	London Jr. Devilettes
2		Leah Carlson	Sophomore	D	5' 8" (1.73 m)		Copper Center, Alaska	Kenny Lake
3		Brittany Howard	Freshman	F	5' 4" (1.63 m)		St. Thomas, Ontario	London Jr. Devilettes
4		Katelyn Scott	Junior	F	5' 6" (1.68 m)		Brighton, Michigan	Belle Tire
5		Anneline Lauziere	Senior	D	5' 6" (1.68 m)		St. Thomas, Ontario	London Jr. Devilettes
6		Kelsey Gunn	Junior	D	5' 9" (1.75 m)		Smith Falls, Ontario	Niagara University
7		Tia Kipfer	Freshman	F	5' 3" (1.6 m)		Stratford, Ontario	London Jr. Devilettes
8		Megan Eady	Sophomore	D	5' 6" (1.68 m)		Renfrew, Ontario	Nepean Jr. Wildcats
9		Kylie St. Louis	Senior	D	5' 11" (1.8 m)		Windsor, Ontario	Southwest Wildcats
10		Rikki Meilleur	Freshman	F	5' 5" (1.65 m)		St. Adolphe, Manitoba	Shaftesbury Titans
11		Kristin Richards (C)	Senior	F	5' 9" (1.75 m)		Toronto, Ontario	Niagara University
14		Mikaela Lowater	Freshman	D	5' 7" (1.7 m)		Thornhill, Ontario	Mississauga Jr. Chiefs
15		Maeve Garvey	Freshman	F	5' 4" (1.63 m)		Oakville, Ontario	Burlington Jr. Barracudas
16		Erin Staniewski	Junior	D	5' 7" (1.7 m)		Strathroy, Ontario	London Jr. Devilettes
17		Anissa Gamble	Sophomore	F	5' 5" (1.65 m)		Fredericton, New Brunswick	Burlington Jr. Barracudas
19		Thea Imbrogno (A)	Senior	F	5' 4" (1.63 m)		Etobicoke, Ontario	Mississauga Jr, Chiefs
21		Maddie Collias	Junior	F	5' 7" (1.7 m)		Roseville, Michigan	Belle Tire
22		Ashley Vesci	Sophomore	F	5' 5" (1.65 m)		Pittsburgh, Pennsylvania	Lawrence Academy(MA)
24		Rebecca Vint	Junior	F	5' 10" (1.78 m)		Caledon, Ontario	Brampton Jr. Thunder
26		Mackenzie Johnston	Freshman	F	5' 7" (1.7 m)		Barrie, Ontario	Etobicoke Jr. Dolphins
27		Katie Fergus	Junior	F	5' 9" (1.75 m)		Oakville, Ontario	Burlington Jr. Barracudas
28		Brandi Pollock (A)	Senior	D	5' 6" (1.68 m)		Virden, Manitoba	Westman Wildcats
29		Carley Catherine	Freshman	G	5' 2" (1.57 m)		Bloomington, Illinois	Rochester Edge
31		Courtney Vinet	Junior	G	5' 4" (1.63 m)		Camrose, Alberta	Edge School

== Schedule ==
Date	Opponent^{#}	Rank^{#}	Site	Decision	Result	Record
Regular Season
October 4	Rensselaer*		RMU Island Sports Center • Neville Township, PA	Courtney Vinet	L 0–3	0–1–0
October 5	Rensselaer*		RMU Island Sports Center • Neville Township, PA	Jessica Dodds	W 3–2 ^{OT}	1–1–0
October 11	at Bemidji State*		Sanford Center • Bemidji, MN	Courtney Vinet	W 2–1	2–1–0
October 12	at Bemidji State*		Sanford Center • Bemidji, MN	Jessica Dodds	W 3–0	3–1–0
October 18	#7 Boston University*		RMU Island Sports Center • Neville Township, PA	Courtney Vinet	L 2–5	3–2–0
October 19	#7 Boston University*		RMU Island Sports Center • Neville Township, PA	Jessica Dodds	W 3–0	4–2–0
October 25	Vermont*		RMU Island Sports Center • Neville Township, PA	Jessica Dodds	W 4–3	5–2–0
October 26	Vermont*		RMU Island Sports Center • Neville Township, PA	Jessica Dodds	W 6–4	6–2–0
October 31	at Penn State		Pegula Ice Arena • University Park, PA	Courtney Vinet	W 4–0	7–2–0 (1–0–0)
November 1	at Penn State		Pegula Ice Arena • University Park, PA	Jessica Dodds	W 6–0	8–2–0 (2–0–0)
November 8	#9 Mercyhurst		RMU Island Sports Center • Neville Township, PA	Courtney Vinet	L 0–2	8–3–0 (2–1–0)
November 9	#9 Mercyhurst		RMU Island Sports Center • Neville Township, PA	Jessica Dodds	W 3–2	9–3–0 (3–1–0)
November 15	Lindenwood		RMU Island Sports Center • Neville Township, PA	Jessica Dodds	W 3–2	10–3–0 (4–1–0)
November 16	Lindenwood		RMU Island Sports Center • Neville Township, PA	Courtney Vinet	W 3–1	11–3–0 (5–1–0)
November 22	at Syracuse		Tennity Ice Skating Pavilion • Syracuse, NY	Jessica Dodds	T 1–1 ^{OT}	11–3–1 (5–1–1)
November 23	at Syracuse		Tennity Ice Skating Pavilion • Syracuse, NY	Jessica Dodds	W 2–1	12–3–1 (6–1–1)
November 26	at Ohio State*	#10	OSU Ice Rink • Columbus, OH	Jessica Dodds	W 2–1	13–3–1
November 29	Maine*	#10	RMU Island Sports Center • Neville Township, PA	Jessica Dodds	W 4–2	14–3–1
December 6	RIT	#10	RMU Island Sports Center • Neville Township, PA	Jessica Dodds	W 2–1	15–3–1 (7–1–1)
December 7	RIT	#10	RMU Island Sports Center • Neville Township, PA	Jessica Dodds	W 4–2	16–3–1 (8–1–1)
January 4, 2014	St. Lawrence*	#10	RMU Island Sports Center • Neville Township, PA	Jessica Dodds	W 4–2	17–3–1
January 5	St. Lawrence*	#10	RMU Island Sports Center • Neville Township, PA	Jessica Dodds	W 3–0	18–3–1
January 17	at #10 Quinnipiac*	#8	TD Bank Sports Center • Hamden, CT	Jessica Dodds	T 1–1 ^{OT}	18–3–2
January 18	at #10 Quinnipiac*	#8	TD Bank Sports Center • Hamden, CT	Jessica Dodds	W 5–1	19–3–2
January 24	at Mercyhurst	#8	Mercyhurst Ice Center • Erie, PA	Jessica Dodds	W 3–1	20–3–2 (9–1–1)
January 25	at Mercyhurst	#8	Mercyhurst Ice Center • Erie, PA	Jessica Dodds	L 3–5	20–4–2 (9–2–1)
January 31	at Lindenwood	#8	Lindenwood Ice Arena • Wentzville, MO	Jessica Dodds	W 6–1	21–4–2 (10–2–1)
February 1	at Lindenwood	#8	Lindenwood Ice Arena • Wentzville, MO	Jessica Dodds	L 2–4	21–5–2 (10–3–1)
February 7	Syracuse	#8	RMU Island Sports Center • Neville Township, PA	Jessica Dodds	T 3–3 ^{OT}	21–5–3 (10–3–2)
February 8	Syracuse	#8	RMU Island Sports Center • Neville Township, PA	Jessica Dodds	L 1–3	21–6–3 (10–4–2)
February 14	at RIT	#9	Frank Ritter Memorial Ice Arena • Rochester, NY	Jessica Dodds	W 2–1	22–6–3 (11–4–2)
February 15	at RIT	#9	Frank Ritter Memorial Ice Arena • Rochester, NY	Jessica Dodds	L 0–1	22–7–3 (11–5–2)
February 21	Penn State	#9	RMU Island Sports Center • Neville Township, PA	Jessica Dodds	W 5–2	23–7–3 (12–5–2)
February 22	Penn State	#9	RMU Island Sports Center • Neville Township, PA	Jessica Dodds	W 4–0	24–7–3 (13–5–2)
CHA Tournament
March 7	vs. RIT*	#10	Mercyhurst Ice Center • Erie, PA (Semifinal Game)	Jessica Dodds	L 1–4	24–8–3
*Non-conference game. ^{#}Rankings from USCHO.com Poll.

== Awards and honors ==
- Brittany Howard and Jessica Dodds were named to the USCHO All-Rookie Team
