= Anissa Gamble =

Canadian ice hockey player

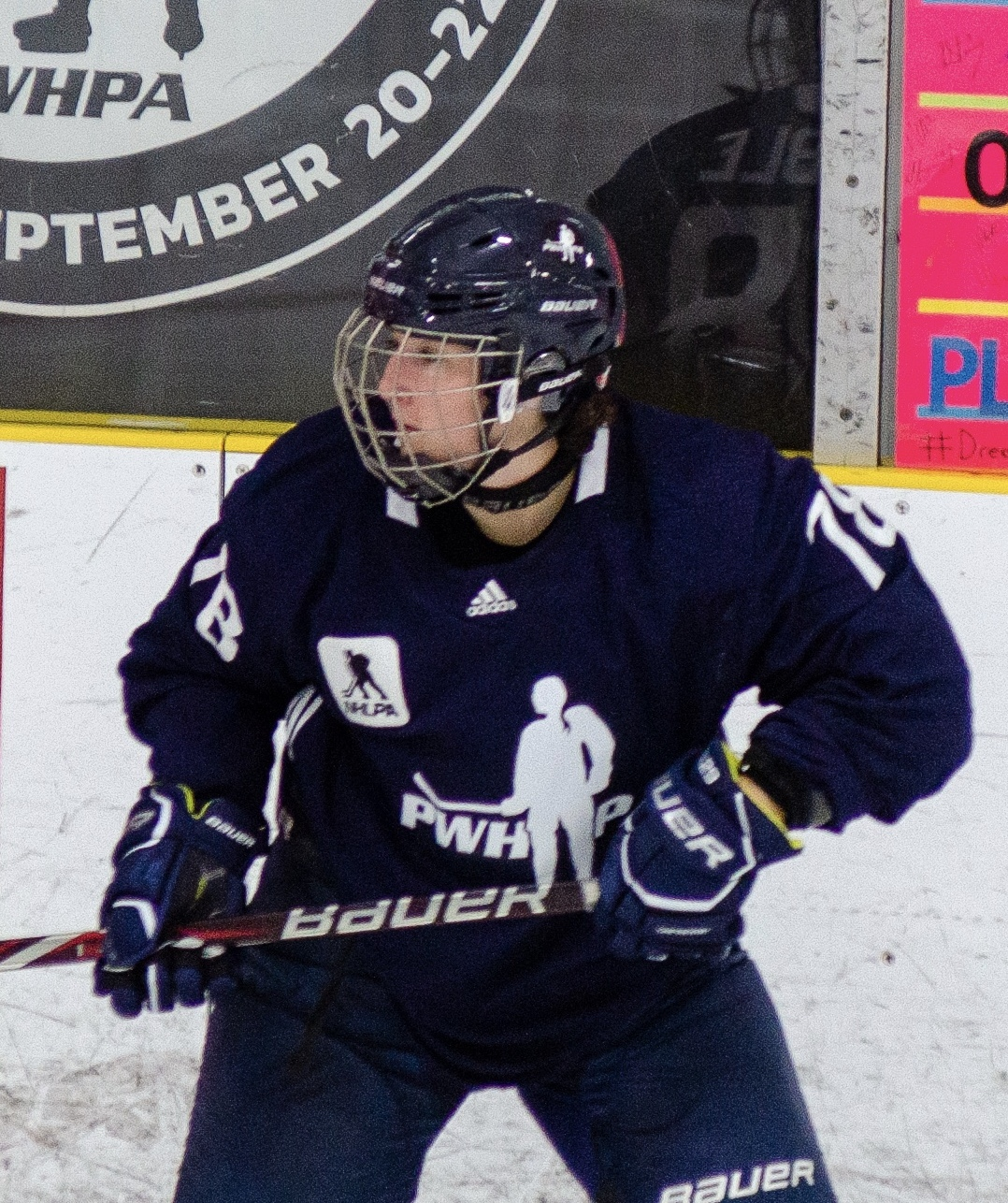
- Gamble in 2019
- Born: May 21, 1993 (age 33) Fredericton, New Brunswick, Canada
- Height: 165 cm (5 ft 5 in)
- Weight: 77.1 kg (170 lb; 12 st 2 lb)
- Position: Forward
- Shot: Right
- Played for: Toronto Furies; Calgary Inferno
- Playing career: 2012–2021

Anissa Gamble (born May 21, 1993) is a Canadian ice hockey forward who most recently played in the Professional Women's Hockey Players Association (PWHPA). She is to date the first female to have played professional ice hockey in North America while living with Type 1 diabetes.

== Playing career ==
Gamble played on youth boys' teams in the Maritimes until the age of 15, when she left home to attend Appleby College in Oakville, Ontario. During her time at Appleby, she played in the Provincial Women's Hockey League with both the Oakville Jr. Hornets and the Burlington Jr. Barracudas.

After finishing high school, she moved to the Greater Pittsburgh Region of Pennsylvania in the United States to study at Robert Morris University and play with the Robert Morris Colonials of the NCAA Division I ice hockey conference College Hockey America (CHA). Across the next four years at the university, she scored 12 points in 118 games.

After graduating from Robert Morris in 2016, she took a year off hockey to focus on her master's degree. In the 2017 CWHL Draft, she was selected 54th overall by the Calgary Inferno.

In 2018, she left Alberta to sign with the Toronto Furies. She would play 19 games with the Furies during the 2018–19 CWHL season, picking up two assists. She recorded her first professional point in a 2-0 victory against the Markham Thunder in November 2018.

After the collapse of the CWHL in May 2019, she joined the GTA West section of the Professional Women's Hockey Players Association (PWHPA), deferring her admission to dentistry school to take an active role in the organisation. She participated in the first PWHPA Unifor Showcase event in Toronto in September 2019 as a member of Team Knox (named after team captain Liz Knox). In the Secret Showcase in January 2020, she played for Team Spooner (named after team captain Natalie Spooner). She was one of the players chosen to take part in a Dream Gap Tour Showcase against the Japanese national team in Tokyo in March 2020, before it was cancelled due to the COVID-19 pandemic. In August 2020, she announced her intention to continue with the PWHPA as an independent member for the 2020–21 season.

== Personal life ==
Gamble was diagnosed with Type 1 diabetes at the age of 8. In addition to focusing her clinical research on diabetes treatment, she is active in the diabetic community and is involved with the non-profit organization Connected in Motion, for people living with diabetes, as well as the Alberta Diabetes Institute and Diabetes Hockey Camp.

Gamble obtained her bachelor's degree in biology with a concentration in pre-med and minor in chemistry from Robert Morris University in 2016, and went on to complete her master's degree in experimental surgery at the University of Alberta in 2019. During her time at the University of Alberta, her clinical research was largely focused on evaluation of islet cell transplantation, an experimental treatment for Type 1 diabetes, under the supervision of advisor Dr. James Shapiro, leader of the clinical team that developed the Edmonton protocol.

Gamble continued her studies at the University Health Network in Toronto, where she studied digital health and worked as a research analyst with the University Health Network, focusing on diabetes eHealth management. She attended the DDS program of Schulich School of Medicine & Dentistry, where she focused on oral health research related to barriers for people living with diabetes. Since completing her studies in 2024, Gamble has worked as a dentist at a private practice in Fredericton, New Brunswick.

== Career statistics ==
			Regular season					Playoffs
Season	Team	League	GP	G	A	Pts	PIM	GP	G	A	Pts	PIM
2010–11	Oakville Hornets	PWHL	30	7	14	21	4	3	1	0	1	2
2011–12	Burlington Jr. Barracudas	PWHL	28	15	12	27	41	6	2	1	3	4
2012–13	Robert Morris Colonials	NCAA	20	0	0	0	6	–	–	–	–	–
2013–14	Robert Morris Colonials	NCAA	30	3	1	4	4	–	–	–	–	–
2014–15	Robert Morris Colonials	NCAA	34	1	4	5	8	–	–	–	–	–
2015–16	Robert Morris Colonials	NCAA	34	2	1	3	2	–	–	–	–	–
2017–18	Calgary Inferno	CWHL	0	0	0	0	0	–	–	–	–	–
2018–19	Toronto Furies	CWHL	19	0	2	2	2	2	0	0	0	0
2019–20	GTA West	PWHPA	–	–	–	–	–	–	–	–	–	–
CWHL totals			19	0	2	2	2	2	0	0	0	0
