= 2013–14 Wisconsin Badgers women's ice hockey season =

NCAA Frozen Four, L, 3-5 vs. Minnesota Golden Gophers
- Conference: WCHA
- Home ice: LaBahn Arena

Record
- Overall: 28-8-2
- Home: 16-4-0
- Road: 10-2-2
- Neutral: 2-2-0

Coaches and captains
- Head coach: Mark Johnson

The Wisconsin Badgers women's ice hockey program represented the University of Wisconsin during the 2013–14 NCAA Division I women's ice hockey season. Goaltender Alex Rigsby graduated as the program’s all-time leader in wins with 100, minutes played with 7,881:09 and saves with 3,126. Of note, her .941 save percentage is tied for first in program history. A 3-1 victory over Bemidji State helped Rigsby surpass Jessie Vetter for the Badgers mark in career wins. In the postseason, the Badgers were defeated 1-0 in the WCHA Final Face-off against the North Dakota Fighting Sioux. Despite the loss, the Badgers would qualify for the NCAA tournament, their seventh in program history. In the quarterfinals, the Badgers defeated Harvard by a 2-1 mark at LaBahn Arena. Advancing to the Frozen Four in Hamden, Connecticut, the Lakers were bested by WCHA rival Minnesota in a 5-3 loss on March 21.

== Offseason ==
=== Recruiting ===
Player	Position	Nationality	Notes
Melissa Channell	Defense	Canada	Shoots left
Jenny Ryan	Defense	United States	Hails from Victor, New York
Sydney McKibbon	Forward	Canada	Member of Canada’s U18 National Team
Sarah Nurse	Forward	Canada	Member of Canada’s U18 National Team; Sister of Oilers 2013 draft pick Darnell Nurse
Ann-Renee Desbiens	Goaltender	Canada	Hails from La Malbaie, Quebec

== Exhibition ==
Date	Opponent	League	Final score
September 23	Team Japan	IIHF	3-0, Wisconsin

== Regular season ==
- February 15, 2014: Competing against the Minnesota Golden Gophers, the two programs set an NCAA women’s hockey attendance record by competing in front of 13,573 fans.

== Postseason ==
=== WCHA Playoffs ===
Date	Opponent	Location	Final score
February 28	Minnesota State	LaBahn Arena	4-0, Wisconsin
March 1	Minnesota State	LaBahn Arena	0-3, Minnesota State
March 2	Minnesota State	LaBahn Arena	2-0, Wisconsin
March 7	North Dakota	Bemidji, Minnesota	0-1, North Dakota

=== NCAA tournament ===
Date	Opponent	Location	Final score
March 15	Harvard	LaBahn Arena	2-1, Wisconsin
March 21	Minnesota	Hamden, CT	3-5, Minnesota

== Home attendance ==
Wisconsin led all NCAA Division I women's ice hockey programs in cumulative home attendance, with 46,589 spectators attending its home games.

The 13,573 spectators at the February 15 home game at the Kohl Center against Minnesota set a new (since surpassed) record for single-game attendance attendance in NCAA Division I women's ice hockey, surpassing the previous record of 12,402 spectators that had been set by Wisconsin's January 28, 2012 home game against Bemidji State at the same arena.

== Awards and honors ==
- Alex Rigsby, 2014 Wisconsin Badgers Female Athlete of the Year
- Alex Rigsby, 2014 AHCA first-team All-American
- Alex Rigsby, 2014 WCHA Scholar-Athlete
- Alex Rigsby, 2014 All-WCHA Academic team
- Alex Rigsby, 2014 first-team All-WCHA
- Alex Rigsby, 2014 All-USCHO first team.
