= 2013–14 UConn Huskies women's ice hockey season =

2013–14 Connecticut Huskies women's ice hockey season
- Conference: WHEA

Record
- Overall: 9-24-2

Coaches and captains
- Head coach: Chris MacKenzie
- Assistant coaches: Jaclyn Hawkins; Casey Handrahan
- Captain: Erin Burns

The UConn Huskies women's ice hockey program represented the University of Connecticut Huskies during the 2013–14 NCAA Division I women's ice hockey season. Huskies alum Jessica Lutz competed for Switzerland at the 2014 Sochi Winter Games, earning a bronze medal.

== Offseason ==
=== Recruiting ===
Player	Position	Nationality	Notes
Susan Cavanagh	Forward	United States	Competed at Cushing Academy
Kelly Harris	Forward	United States	Played for Little Caesars in Detroit
Carly Haskins	Defense	United States	Hometown is Andover, Minnesota
Alexandra Lersch	Defense	United States	Competed with Connecticut Polar Bears
Kaitlin Storo	Forward	United States	Played at Chanhassen High School
Jessica Stott	Defense	United States	Hails from Niverville, Manitoba
Viivi Vaattovaara	Forward/Defense	Finland	Hails from Veikkola, Finland

== Exhibition ==
Date	Opponent	League	Final score
September 21	Western Mustangs	CIS	6-2, Minnesota
September 22	Whitby Wolves	PWHL	9-1, Minnesota

== Awards and honors ==
- Elaine Chuli, Hockey East Co-Goaltender of the Month, January 2014
- Elaine Chuli, Hockey East Honorable Mention All-Star

=== Team Awards ===
- Elaine Chuli, Huskies Most Valuable Player
- Erin Burns, Unsung Hero Award
- Alexandra Lersch, Most Improved Player Award
- Jessica Stott, Rookie of the Year
- Sarah MacDonnell. Pat Babcock Award
