= Rachel Ramsey =

American ice hockey player

- Born: 14 October 1992 (age 34) Chanhassen, Minnesota
- Height: 6 ft 0 in (183 cm)
- Position: Defense
- Shot: Left
- NCAA team: Minnesota Golden Gophers
- Playing career: 2011–2015

Rachel Ramsey (born 14 October 1992) is a former American ice hockey forward who won three US Collegiate (NCAA) championships with the University of Minnesota Golden Gophers.

She is the daughter of former Olympic and NHL star Mike Ramsey.

== Early career ==
Ramsey attended Minnetonka High School in Minnetonka, Minnesota, where she was a standout all-star. She also played club hockey with the Minnesota Jr. Whitecaps.

== NCAA career ==
Ramsey played as a freshman for the NCAA Championship 2011-12 Minnesota team. She made an impact as a defender, leading the freshman class in scoring, and earning a spot on the Western Collegiate Hockey Association (WCHA) All-Rookie team. She played in all 41 games, including the National Championship game.

In her sophomore season (2012–13) she once again played all 41 games in a championship season, amassing +/- figure of +46. She was once again lauded by the WCHA as a third-team all-star.

In the 2013-14 season, she became recognized as a national leader in the defense position. She played all 41 games again, with a +/- ratio of +42. She was named WCHA Defensive Player of the Year, and a first-team all-star, a USCHO first-team all-star, and was named an All-American first-team all-star by the American Hockey Coaches Association (AHCA). She scored 43 points, second in the nation for defense.

During her senior year (2014–15), she again appeared in all 41 Gopher's games, hence competing in every game during her NCAA career. She was named team co-captain and had a personal best +49 rating. With 33 points, she ranked second nationally in defensive scoring. She was again recognized as the WCHA Defensive Player of the year, first-team all-star, and first-team All-American. She was a second-team USCHO pick. Her most prestigious award was her selection as a Patty Kazmaier Award top-ten finalist, the award for the best female college hockey player in the country.

=== NCAA Statistics ===
Season	GP	G	A	Pts	PIM	PPG	SHG	GWG
2013–14	41	4	21	25	38	3	0	0
2014–15	41	9	20	29	38	0	1	4
2015–16	41	12	31	43	36	6	0	2
2016–17	41	9	24	33	34	3	0	3
Career Totals	164	34	96	130	146	12	1	9

== Post-NCAA Career ==
Ramsey studied at the University of Minnesota, graduating with a B.A. in business with minors in marketing and communications. Despite offers to play both internationally and professionally, she chose to retire from hockey and focus on a career in communications and advertising. She had a brief career as a sports radio commentator and is now a DJ on K-102, a Minneapolis country music radio station, as well as the head of business development for a sports media company.
