= Dani Cameranesi =

American ice hockey player (born 1995)

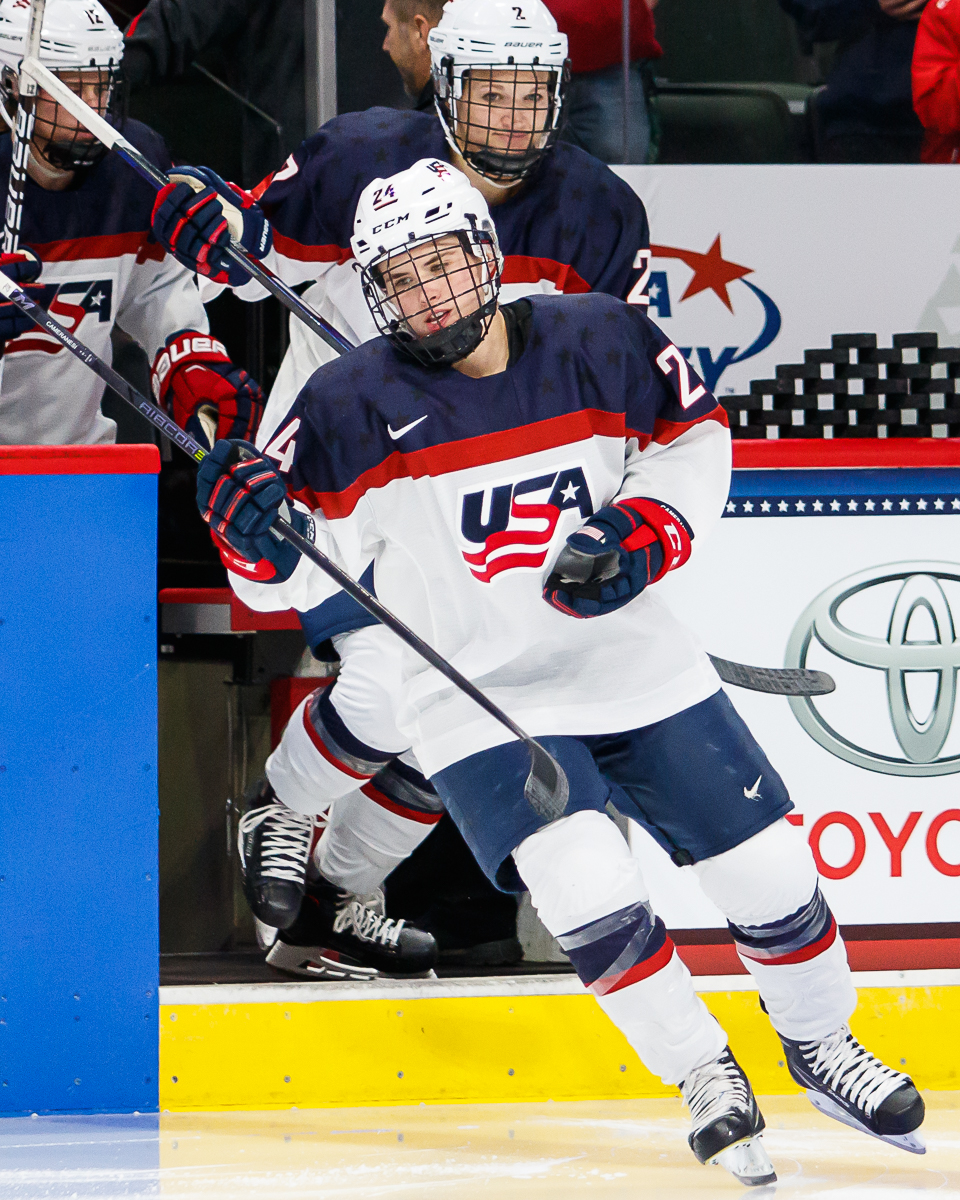
- Dani Cameranesi playing for Team USA in 2017
- Born: June 3, 1995 (age 31) Plymouth, Minnesota, U.S.
- Height: 5 ft 5 in (165 cm)
- Weight: 154 lb (70 kg; 11 st 0 lb)
- Position: Forward
- Shoots: Left
- PWHPA team Former teams: Minnesota; Buffalo Beauts; Minnesota Golden Gophers
- National team: United States
- Playing career: 2013–present
Medal record
Women's ice hockey
Representing United States
Olympic Games
Gold medal – first place	2018 Pyeongchang	Team
Silver medal – second place	2022 Beijing	Team
World Championships
Gold medal – first place	2015 Sweden
Gold medal – first place	2019 Finland
Silver medal – second place	2021 Canada
World U18 Championships
Silver medal – second place	2012 Czech Republic

Danielle Cameranesi Brodzinski (born June 3, 1995) is a former American women's ice hockey forward who now works as a scout for the Minnesota Frost in the Professional Women's Hockey League (PWHL). Cameranesi last played for the Minnesota section of the PWHPA in 2021.

She is a two-time Olympic Medalist, winning gold in 2018 and silver in 2022, and a three-time IIHF World Championship Medalist (gold 2015, 2019, and silver 2021).

== Playing career ==
During the 2010–11 season, she registered 79 points (35 goals, 44 assists) while serving as team captain with The Blake School. Of note, the team was also conference champions.

=== USA Hockey ===
In August 2011, she was named to the under-18 U.S. team that competed versus Canada in a three-game series in Rockland, Ontario. In the USA's 13–1 defeat of the Czech Republic at the 2012 IIHF World Women's U18 Championship, Cameranesi assisted on Molly Illikainen's goal.

Internationally, Cameranesi made her debut for the US national women's team at the 2014 4 Nations Cup in Kamloops, British Columbia, Canada.

She was named to the roster of the United States national women's ice hockey team that competed at the 2015 IIHF Women's World Championship. The 2015 team took gold. She also played in the 2019 and 2021 editions of the tournament, earning gold and silver respectively.

Cameransi was part of Team USA's 2018 Winter Olympics roster, which went on to win gold. On January 2, 2022, Cameranesi was named to Team USA's roster to represent the United States at the 2022 Winter Olympics. Team USA earned a silver medal. On July 20, 2022, Cameranesi announced her retirement from international competition. She finished her career with 24 goals and 58 points in 87 games.

=== NCAA ===
During the 2013–14 season in her freshman year, she recorded 19 goals and 17 assists. She was the leading scorer among WCHA freshmen and finished tied for ninth among all league scorers. Following the season she was named the inaugural National Rookie of the Year.

Donning the maroon and gold during exhibition play, she first appeared with the Golden Gophers in a September 26 contest versus the Japanese national team. With Japan having qualified for the 2014 Sochi Winter Games, it was a unique display of women's hockey. Cameranesi would log an even strength goal to give Minnesota a 3–0 lead in the second period. Minnesota would prevail by a 6–0 tally.

The following day, she scored a goal versus the University of British Columbia in the third period of a 7–0 whitewash at Ridder Arena. Perhaps more impressive was that said goal was scored against former Canadian national team member Danielle Dube.

She would register the first points of her NCAA career on October 12, 2013, in a 2–0 shutout victory over the rival Wisconsin Badgers. Cameranesi registered two assists on a pair of even-strength goals in the third period which were both scored by Kelly Terry.

=== Professional career ===
On June 12, 2018, Cameranesi signed with the Buffalo Beauts of the National Women's Hockey League. She scored 15 points in 14 games during the 2018-19 season.

Cameranesi joined the scouting staff of the Minnesota Frost in November 2024, scouting Minnesota and the Upper Midwest.

== Career statistics ==
=== Regular season and playoffs ===
			Regular season					Playoffs
Season	Team	League	GP	G	A	Pts	PIM	GP	G	A	Pts	PIM
2009–10	The Blake School	MSHSL	24	33	32	65	10	2	0	0	0	0
2010–11	The Blake School	MSHSL	25	31	40	71	16	2	4	4	8	0
2011–12	The Blake School	MSHSL	19	39	20	59	8	3	9	4	13	4
2012–13	The Blake School	MSHSL	22	49	32	81	18	5	8	6	14	6
2013–14	University of Minnesota	WCHA	41	19	17	36	14	—	—	—	—	—
2014–15	University of Minnesota	WCHA	40	23	42	65	24	—	—	—	—	—
2015–16	University of Minnesota	WCHA	40	33	35	68	28	—	—	—	—	—
2016–17	University of Minnesota	WCHA	22	18	14	32	14	—	—	—	—	—
2018–19	Buffalo Beauts	NWHL	14	4	11	15	6	2	1	2	3	2
NWHL totals			14	4	11	15	6	2	1	2	3	2

=== USA Hockey ===
Year	Team	Event	Result	GP	G	A	Pts	PIM
2012	United States	U18	2nd place, silver medalist(s)	5	0	2	2	2
2013	United States	U18	2nd place, silver medalist(s)	5	2	4	6	0
2015	United States	WC	1st place, gold medalist(s)	5	0	3	3	0
2018	United States	OG	1st place, gold medalist(s)	5	3	2	5	0
2019	United States	WC	1st place, gold medalist(s)	7	3	4	7	2
2021	United States	WC	2nd place, silver medalist(s)	7	1	1	2	4
2022	United States	OG	2nd place, silver medalist(s)	7	2	1	3	7
Senior totals				31	9	11	20	13

== Awards and honors ==
- 2010 Minnesota All-State honoree
- 2011 Minnesota All-State honoree
- 2011 Most Valuable Player, Blake School
- 2013 Minnesota Ms. Hockey Award
- 2014 Women's Hockey Commissioners Association National Rookie of the Year
- 2015 CCM Hockey Women's Division I All-Americans, Second Team

=== WCHA ===
- WCHA Player of the Week (Week of October 21)
- WCHA Offensive Player of the Week, (Week of February 17, 2015)
- WCHA Offensive Player of the Week, (Week of February 24, 2015)
