= 2013–14 Boston College Eagles women's ice hockey season =

Ice hockey season

2014 Beanpot Champions Hockey East regular season title NCAA Quarterfinals, L, 1-3 vs. Clarkson
- Conference: HEA

Record
- Overall: 27-7-3

Coaches and captains
- Head coach: Katie King-Crowley

The Boston College Eagles women's ice hockey program represented Boston College during the 2013–14 NCAA Division I women's ice hockey season. Boston College (BC) has a women's ice hockey team that competes at the Division 1 level. The team is composed of 26 players from all across the United States. Their season runs from September to April, one of the longest sport seasons in college athletics. The team competes in Hockey East, and opposes Boston University, Northeastern University, Providence College, Connecticut University, Vermont Catamounts, the University of Maine and the University of New Hampshire. BC's main inter league rivals are Boston University and Northeastern, two teams that are also located within the city of Boston. BC has advanced to the Frozen Four in the last three consecutive seasons and hopes to do the same this season. Boston College is currently ranked #4 in national polls and #2 in Hockey East polls.

The squad tied the program record for most wins in one season with 27, while their 18-2-1 conference mark was the best in program history. By season's end, the Eagles had garnered their first-ever regular season title and fifth Beanpot championship. In the postseason, the Eagles were defeated by a 3–1 mark against the eventual national champion Clarkson Golden Knights in the opening round of the NCAA tournament.

== Offseason ==
=== Recruiting ===
Player	Position	Nationality	Notes
Kristyn Cappizano	Forward	Canada	Won gold medal at 2013 IIHF U18 Women's Worlds
Lauren Weddell	Defense	United States	Played for Minnesota Thoroughbreds
Haley McLean	Forward	United States	Competed with Honeybaked U19
Andie Anastos	Forward	United States	Competed with Honeybaked U19

== Exhibition ==
Date	Opponent	League	Final score
September 28	Western Mustangs	CIS	2–0, Boston College
September 22	Whitby Wolves	PWHL	9–1, Minnesota

== Beanpot ==
Date	Opponent	Location	Final score
February 4	Boston University	Chestnut Hill, Mass	4–1, Boston College
February 11	Northeastern	Chestnut Hill, Mass	3–0, Boston College

== Postseason ==
=== Hockey East ===
Date	Opponent	Location	Final score
February 28	New Hampshire	Chestnut Hill, Mass	8–1, Boston College
March 8	Vermont	Hyannis, Mass	3–1, Boston College
March 9	Boston University	Hyannis, Mass	2–3, BU

=== NCAA tournament ===
Date	Opponent	Location	Final score
March 15	Clarkson	Potsdam, NY	1–3, Clarkson

== Awards and honors ==
- Kristyn Capizzano, Hockey East Rookie of the Week (Week of March 18, 2014)
- Emily Pfalzer, All-New England Division I Women's All-Star Team
- Haley Skarupa, All-New England Division I Women's All-Star Team
