= Milica McMillen =

American ice hockey player

- Born: July 13, 1993 (age 32) St. Paul, Minnesota U.S.
- Height: 5 ft 10 in (178 cm)
- Weight: 165 lb (75 kg; 11 st 11 lb)
- Position: Defense
- Shoots: Left
- NWHL team: New York Riveters
- Playing career: 2016–present

Milica McMillen (born July 13, 1993) is an American former professional ice hockey player. McMillen was drafted by the Connecticut Whale of the National Women's Hockey League (NWHL) in 2015, and joined the New York Riveters franchise for the 2016–17 NWHL season.

== Career ==
During college, McMillen played for University of Minnesota for four seasons between 2013 and 2016 in NCAA Division I college women's ice hockey.

=== National Women's Hockey League ===
In 2015, McMillen was drafted 10th overall by the Connecticut Whale in the first-ever PHF draft. In June 2016, McMillen signed a one-year contract worth $17,000 to play in the 2016–17 NWHL season with the New York Riveters. As part of the deal, the Connecticut Whale received $2,000 towards their salary cap from the Riveters.

== Career statistics ==
=== Regular season ===
Note: GP = Games played; G = Goals; A = Assists; Pts = Points; PIM = Penalty minutes;

			Regular season					Playoffs
Season	Team	League	GP	G	A	Pts	PIM	GP	G	A	Pts	PIM
2012–13	Minnesota Golden Gophers	WCHA	35	13	13	26	59	—	—	—	—	—
2013–14	Minnesota Golden Gophers	WCHA	39	11	28	39	62	—	—	—	—	—
2014–15	Minnesota Golden Gophers	WCHA	37	11	16	27	55	—	—	—	—	—
2015–16	Minnesota Golden Gophers	WCHA	38	9	19	28	36	—	—	—	—	—
2016–17	New York Riveters	NWHL	18	3	6	9	21	1	0	0	0	0
NWHL totals			18	3	6	9	21	1	0	0	0	0
