= Steve Sertich =

American ice hockey player (born 1952)

Personal information
- Nationality: American
- Born: October 20, 1952 (age 72); Virginia, Minnesota, United States

Sport
- Sport: Ice hockey

Steve Sertich (born October 20, 1952) is an American ice hockey player. He competed in the men's tournament at the 1976 Winter Olympics.
