= 2013–14 NCAA Division I women's ice hockey season =

- NCAA tournament: 2014
- NCAA champion: Clarkson
- Patty Kazmaier Award: Jamie Lee Rattray ()

The 2013–14 NCAA Division I women's ice hockey season begin in October 2013, and ended with the 2014 NCAA Division I Women's Ice Hockey Tournament's championship game on March 23, 2014.

== Exhibition ==
=== CIS Exhibition ===
Date	NCAA school	CIS school	Location	Score	NCAA goal scorers
01/03/14	Clarkson Golden Knights	McGill Martlets	Potsdam, NY	7–0, Clarkson	

== News and notes ==
=== December ===
On December 7, 2013, Christine Bestland of the Mercyhurst Lakers logged the 200th point of her NCAA career in an 8–0 victory against Penn State.

== Awards and honors ==
=== Patti Kazmaier Award ===
Winner: Jamie Lee Rattray (F), Clarkson Golden Knights

Finalists

- Hannah Brandt (F), Minnesota Golden Gophers
- Jillian Saulnier (F), Cornell Big Red

Top-10 Finalists

- Erin Ambrose (D), Clarkson Golden Knights
- Brittany Ammerman (F), Wisconsin Badgers
- Kelly Babstock (F), Quinnipiac Bobcats
- Christine Bestland (F), Mercyhurst Lakers
- Rachael Bona (F), Minnesota Golden Gophers
- Sarah Lefort (F), Boston University Terriers
- Emerance Maschmeyer (G), Harvard Crimson

=== AHCA Coach of the Year ===
- Brad Frost, Minnesota

== All-American selections ==
Players selected by the American Hockey Coaches Association (AHCA).

=== First team ===
- Goaltender: Alex Rigsby, Wisconsin Badgers
- Defense
  - Erin Ambrose, Clarkson Golden Knights
  - Rachel Ramsey, Minnesota Golden Gophers
- Forwards
  - Hannah Brandt, Minnesota Golden Gophers
  - Jamie Lee Rattray, Clarkson Golden Knights
  - Jillian Saulnier, Cornell Big Red

=== Second team ===
- Goaltender: Emerance Maschmeyer, Harvard Crimson
- Defence
  - Alyssa Gagliardi, Cornell Big Red
  - Milica McMillen, Minnesota Golden Gophers
- Forwards
  - Sarah Lefort, Boston University Terriers
  - Kelly Babstock, Quinnipiac Bobcats
  - Christine Bestland, Mercyhurst Lakers

== See also ==
- National Collegiate Women's Ice Hockey Championship
- 2013–14 CHA women's ice hockey season
- 2013–14 ECAC women's ice hockey season
- 2013–14 Hockey East women's ice hockey season
- 2013–14 WCHA women's ice hockey season
