= 2012–13 Bemidji State Beavers women's ice hockey season =

- Conference: 8th WCHA
- Home ice: Sanford Center

Record
- Overall: 6–26–2 (5–22–1 in WCHA play)
- Home: 2–13–1
- Road: 4–13–1

Coaches and captains
- Head coach: Steve Sertich
- Assistant coaches: Amber Fryklund; Shane Veenker
- Captain(s): Sadie Lunquist; Erika Wheelhouse
- Alternate captain: MacKenzie Thurston

The Bemidji State Beavers represented Bemidji State University in 2012–13 WCHA women's ice hockey. The Beavers finished 8th in the conference and lost to undefeated Minnesota in the playoffs.

== Offseason ==
- June 13, 2012: Former Beavers captain Montana Vichorek was one of three student-athletes awarded a Post-Graduate Scholarship from the WCHA.
- June 26, 2012: Former Bemidji State head coach Bruce Olson died at the age of 55 after succumbing to cancer.
- July 31, 2012: Beavers captain Erika Wheelhouse is among 79 players invited to attend the USA Women's Hockey Festival from August 5 to 13 in Blaine, Minnesota.

=== Recruiting ===
Player	Nationality	Position	Notes
Kristin Huber	Canada	Forward	Attended Pursuit of Excellence Academy
Hanna Moher	Canada	Forward	Played for Mississauga Jr. Chiefs
Lauren Merkley	Canada	Defense	Played for Mississauga Jr. Chiefs
Alexane Rodrigue	Canada	Goaltender	Played at Ontario Hockey Academy
Kaitlin Tougas	Canada	Forward	Competed for the Thunder Bay Queens

=== Transfers ===
Player	Position	Former school
Abby Ryplanski	Goaltender	Niagara

=== 2013–14 Beavers ===
No.	Nat.	Player	Class	Pos	Height	DoB	Hometown	Previous team
3		Abby Williams	Senior (RS)	F	5' 2" (1.57 m)		Alexandria, Minnesota	Minnesota State
5		Alex Citrowske	Sophomore	F	5' 6" (1.68 m)		Savage, Minnesota	Prior Lake HS
6		Kristen Huber	Sophomore	F	5' 11" (1.8 m)		Kelowna, British Columbia	Pursuit of Excellence
8		Megan Lushanko	Freshman	F	5' 3" (1.6 m)		Chisago City, Minnesota	Chisago Lakes HS
9		Kaitlyn Tougas	Freshman	F	5' 4" (1.63 m)		Thunder Bay, Ontario	Thunder Bay Queens
11		Whitney Wivoda	Sophomore (RS)	F	5' 8" (1.73 m)		Fairbanks, Alaska	Lathrop HS
12		Emily McKnight	Junior	F	5' 8" (1.73 m)		Carman, Manitoba	Lathrop HS
13		Molly Arola	Senior	F	5' 9" (1.75 m)		Walker, Minnesota	Greenway HS
14		Erika Wheelhouse (C)	Senior	D	5' 3" (1.6 m)		Crookston, Minnesota	Crookston HS
16		MacKenzie Thurston (A)	Senior	F	5' 7" (1.7 m)		Ottawa, Ontario	Ottawa Jr. Senators
17		Sadie Lundquist (C)	Senior	F	5' 5" (1.65 m)		Cloquet, Minnesota	Cloquet HS
18		Rachael Kelly	Sophomore	F	5' 5" (1.65 m)		Rosemount, Minnesota	Rosemount HS
19		Tess Dusik	Junior	F	6' 0" (1.83 m)		Oak Bluff, Manitoba	Balmoral Prep
20		Jenessa Philipczyk	Freshman (RS)	F	5' 7" (1.7 m)		Stillwater, Minnesota	Minnesota Thoroughbreds
24		Alex Ehlert	Junior	D	5' 6" (1.68 m)		Portage, Wisconsin	Madison Capitols AAA
27		Kayleigh Chapman	Sophomore	D	5' 8" (1.73 m)		Virden, Manitoba	Warner Hockey Academy
28		Allie Duellman	Junior	D	5' 8" (1.73 m)		Maplewood, Minnesota	Roseville Area HS
30		Abby Ryplanski	Sophomore	G	5' 4" (1.63 m)		Winnipeg, Manitoba	Niagara University
31		Alexane Rodrigue	Freshman	G	5' 9" (1.75 m)		Monkland, Ontario	Ontario Hockey Academy
35		Jessica Havel	Senior (RS)	G	5' 7" (1.7 m)		Grand Rapids, Michigan	Greenway HS
56		Hannah Moher	Freshman	F	5' 6" (1.68 m)		Milton, Ontario	Mississauga Jr, Chiefs
59		Danielle Williams	Junior	D	5' 10" (1.78 m)		Waconia, Minnesota	Minnesota Thoroughbreds
64		Natasha Kostenko	Sophomore	F	5' 11" (1.8 m)		Fannystelle, Manitoba	Notre Dame Hounds
74		Lauren Merkley	Freshman	D	5' 7" (1.7 m)		Mississauga, Ontario	Mississauga Jr. Chiefs
91		Jamie Hatheway	Senior	F	5' 6" (1.68 m)		Trenton, Ontario	Durham Jr. Lightning
92		Ivana Bilic	Freshman	D	5' 7" (1.7 m)		Coquitlam, British Columbia	Warner Hockey Academy

== Schedule ==
Date	Opponent^{#}	Rank^{#}	Site	Decision	Result	Record
Regular Season
October 5	at Providence*		Schneider Arena • Providence, RI	Jessica Havel	W 3–2	1–0–0
October 6	at Providence*		Schneider Arena • Providence, RI	Abby Ryplanski	L 1–5	1–1–0
October 12	St. Cloud State		Sanford Center • Bemidji, MN	Jessica Havel	L 1–3	1–2–0 (0–1–0)
October 13	St. Cloud State		Sanford Center • Bemidji, MN	Abby Ryplanski	L 0–1	1–3–0 (0–2–0)
October 19	at #9 Wisconsin		LaBahn Arena • Madison, WI	Abby Ryplanski	W 1–0	2–3–0 (1–2–0)
October 21	at #9 Wisconsin		LaBahn Arena • Madison, WI	Abby Ryplanski	T 3–3 ^{OT}	2–3–1 (1–2–1)
October 26	at #10 Ohio State		OSU Ice Rink • Columbus, OH	Abby Ryplanski	L 1–4	2–4–1 (1–3–1)
October 27	at #10 Ohio State		OSU Ice Rink • Columbus, OH	Abby Ryplanski	L 1–10	2–5–1 (1–4–1)
November 9	Maine*		Sanford Center • Bemidji, MN	Abby Ryplanski	L 3–4	2–6–1
November 10	Maine*		Sanford Center • Bemidji, MN	Jessica Havel	T 2–2 ^{OT}	2–6–2
November 17	#10 North Dakota		Sanford Center • Bemidji, MN	Jessica Havel	L 1–3	2–7–2 (1–5–1)
November 18	#10 North Dakota		Sanford Center • Bemidji, MN	Jessica Havel	L 3–7	2–8–2 (1–6–1)
November 23	at Minnesota State		All Seasons Arena • Mankato, MN	Jessica Havel	W 4–3	3–8–2 (2–6–1)
November 24	at Minnesota State		All Seasons Arena • Mankato, MN	Jessica Havel	L 1–4	3–9–2 (2–7–1)
December 1	Minnesota Duluth		Sanford Center • Bemidji, MN	Jessica Havel	L 2–4	3–10–2 (2–8–1)
December 2	Minnesota Duluth		Sanford Center • Bemidji, MN	Alexane Rodrigue	L 1–4	3–11–2 (2–9–1)
December 7	#1 Minnesota		Sanford Center • Bemidji, MN	Jessica Havel	L 1–5	3–12–2 (2–10–1)
December 8	#1 Minnesota		Sanford Center • Bemidji, MN	Jessica Havel	L 0–5	3–13–2 (2–11–1)
January 4, 2013	at St. Cloud State		National Hockey Center • St. Cloud, MN	Abby Ryplanski	L 2–4	3–14–2 (2–12–1)
January 5	at St. Cloud State		National Hockey Center • St. Cloud, MN	Jessica Havel	W 2–0	4–14–2 (3–12–1)
January 11	Minnesota State		Sanford Center • Bemidji, MN	Jessica Havel	W 2–0	5–14–2 (4–12–1)
January 12	Minnesota State		Sanford Center • Bemidji, MN	Jessica Havel	L 3–4 ^{OT}	5–15–2 (4–13–1)
January 18	at Minnesota Duluth		AMSOIL Arena • Duluth, MN	Abby Ryplanski	L 0–3	5–16–2 (4–14–1)
January 19	at Minnesota Duluth		AMSOIL Arena • Duluth, MN	Jessica Havel	L 2–4	5–17–2 (4–15–1)
February 1	Ohio State		Sanford Center • Bemidji, MN	Abby Ryplanski	L 1–2 ^{OT}	5–18–2 (4–16–1)
February 2	Ohio State		Sanford Center • Bemidji, MN	Abby Ryplanski	W 2–1	6–18–2 (5–16–1)
February 8	at #9 North Dakota		Ralph Engelstad Arena • Grand Forks, ND	Abby Ryplanski	L 3–4 ^{OT}	6–19–2 (5–17–1)
February 9	at #9 North Dakota		Ralph Engelstad Arena • Grand Forks, ND	Abby Ryplanski	L 0–7	6–20–2 (5–18–1)
February 15	at #1 Minnesota		Ridder Arena • Minneapolis, MN	Abby Ryplanski	L 0–8	6–21–2 (5–19–1)
February 16	at #1 Minnesota		Ridder Arena • Minneapolis, MN	Jessica Havel	L 2–3 ^{OT}	6–22–2 (5–20–1)
February 22	#6 Wisconsin		Sanford Center • Bemidji, MN	Jessica Havel	L 0–2	6–23–2 (5–21–1)
February 23	#6 Wisconsin		Sanford Center • Bemidji, MN	Jessica Havel	L 1–3	6–24–2 (5–22–1)
WCHA Tournament
March	at #1 Minnesota*		Ridder Arena • Minneapolis (Quarterfinals, Game 1)	Jessica Havel	L 0–5	6–25–2
March 2	at #1 Minnesota*		Ridder Arena • Minneapolis, MN (Quarterfinals, Game 2)	Jessica Havel	L 0–8	6–26–2
*Non-conference game. ^{#}Rankings from USCHO.com Poll.
