= Andrea Dalen =

Norwegian ice hockey player (born 1992)

- Born: 19 June 1992 (age 33) Hønefoss, Norway
- Height: 173 cm (5 ft 8 in)
- Weight: 64 kg (141 lb; 10 st 1 lb)
- Position: Left Wing
- Shoots: Right
- SDHL team Former teams: Frölunda HC: Linköping HC; Djurgårdens IF; University of North Dakota; Vålerenga Ishockey
- National team: Norway
- Playing career: 2006–present

Andrea Schjelderup Dalen (born 19 June 1992) is a Norwegian ice hockey forward, currently playing in the Swedish Women's Hockey League (SDHL) with Frölunda HC. She has been a member of the Norwegian national ice hockey team since 2008. Dalen holds the record for most goals in a single SDHL season, with 47 scored in the 2015–16 season, and is the seventh leading all-time points scorer in SDHL history.

== Playing career ==
Dalen grew up playing on boys' teams in Ringerike, Norway and with women's teams of Vålerenga Ishockey. In 2009, she moved to Sweden to attend the ice hockey gymnasium of Linköping HC and play with the club's women's team in the Riksserien (renamed Swedish Women's Hockey League in 2016). She led Linköping to a runner-up finish in the 2011 playoffs, while finishing as playoff scoring champion with seven points in four contests. In the regular season, she finished sixth in the scoring race. By the end of her two seasons in Linköping, she had scored 81 points in 54 games, including 50 goals.

Dalen joined the North Dakota women's ice hockey program in September 2011, joining fellow Norwegian Jorid Dagfinrud. Across 143 games with North Dakota, she scored 63 points, serving as the team's captain in her final season.

After graduating, Dalen returned to the Riksserien the 2015–16 season and signed with Djurgårdens IF Hockey. In her first Djurgårdens, she set the league record for goals in a season after scoring 47 goals in 36 games; she ended the season with a total of 73 points and twelve penalty minutes. In the following season, the team won the SDHL championship. She was named Djurgården's captain in 2018 and served in role for three seasons, until signing with Linköping HC for the 2021–22 SDHL season.

Following her season with Linköping, Dalen opted to sign with Frölunda HC, a team founded in 2022 and helmed by general manager Kim Martin Hasson. As a newly established team, Frölunda was required to play the 2022–23 season in the Nationella Damhockeyligan (NDHL) but the team made it clear that the goal was promotion to the SDHL at season's end. Led by SDHL stars Dalen, Michelle Karvinen, Hanna Olsson, Sarah-Ève Coutu-Godbout, and Stephanie Neatby, the team quickly rose to dominance and earned promotion to the SDHL in March 2023. In addition to scoring the first goal in team history, Dalen ranked third of all players in the NDHL and on the team for points with 97 points from 53 goals and 44 assists in 27 regular season games – a scoring pace of 4.1 points per game pace and just one goal shy of 2 goals per game.

=== International ===
Dalen represented her native Norway in the Division I tournament of the IIHF Women's World Championship in 2009 and 2011. She registered four goals and one assist in 2009 tournament, helping Norway finish third in their division. At the 2011 tournament, she tied for fourth in tournament scoring.

Dalen played for Norway at the 2011 IIHF 12 Nations Tournament. She ranked second in Group C scoring with 6 points, only trailing teammate Helene Martinsen whose 8 points led all players in the Group C tournament.

== Awards and honors ==
- Norway's best player of the game against Germany, 2011 Division I International Ice Hockey Federation World Championships

== Career statistics ==
=== Regular season and playoffs ===
			Regular season					Postseason
Season	Team	League	GP	G	A	Pts	PIM	GP	G	A	Pts	PIM
2009–10	Linköping HC	Riksserien	27	21	21	42	10	5	4	4	8	2
2010–11	Linköping HC	Riksserien	27	29	10	39	12	4	5	2	7	0
2011–12	North Dakota	WCHA	37	9	4	13	8	–	–	–	–	–
2012–13	North Dakota	WCHA	34	4	6	10	29	–	–	–	–	–
2012–13	North Dakota	WCHA	36	7	7	14	22	–	–	–	–	–
2014–15	North Dakota	WCHA	36	11	15	26	39	–	–	–	–	–
2015–16	Djurgårdens IF	Riksserien	36	47	26	73	12	4	1	6	7	4
2016–17	Djurgårdens IF	SDHL	28	15	12	27	18	7	6	2	8	4
2017–18	Djurgårdens IF	SDHL	36	29	19	48	20	4	1	3	4	4
2018–19	Djurgårdens IF	SDHL	36	19	22	41	30	4	2	2	4	12
2019–20	Djurgårdens IF	SDHL	32	13	8	21	16	5	1	2	3	2
2020–21	Djurgårdens IF	SDHL	31	13	12	25	12	6	2	3	5	8
2021–22	Linköping HC	SDHL	30	13	15	28	6	7	2	0	2	0
2022–23	Frölunda HC	NDHL	27	53	44	97	6	5	3	8	11	0
NCAA totals			143	31	32	63	98	–	–	–	–	–
SDHL totals			283	199	145	344	136	46	24	24	48	36

=== International ===
Year	Team	Event	Result	GP	G	A	Pts	PIM
2008	Norway	OGQ	DNQ	3	2	1	3	6
2009	Norway U18	18WC D1	13th	4	3	0	3	12
2009	Norway	WC D1	12th	5	4	1	5	14
2010	Norway U18	18WC	13th	5	8	3	11	6
2011	Norway	WC D1	10th	4	2	2	4	2
2011	Norway	12N	–	4	3	3	6	4
2012	Norway	WC D1A	10th	5	4	5	9	2
2013	Norway	WC D1A	13th	5	2	2	4	6
2013	Norway	OGQ	DNQ	3	1	2	3	0
2014	Norway	WC D1A	10th	5	7	0	7	6
2015	Norway	WC D1A	13th	5	2	3	5	4
2016	Norway	WC D1A	13th	5	4	0	4	4
2017	Norway	WC D1A	11th	5	4	2	6	0
2017	Norway	OGQ	DNQ	6	2	5	7	0
2018	Norway	WC D1A	14th	5	2	1	3	4
2019	Norway	WC D1A	13th	5	1	2	3	0
2021	Norway	OGQ	DNQ	3	2	1	3	0
2022	Norway	WC D1A	12th	4	2	2	4	0
2023	Norway	WC D1A	15th	5	0	4	4	2
Junior totals				9	11	3	14	18
Senior totals				58	34	24	58	44
