= 2012–13 WCHA women's ice hockey season =

2012–13 Western Collegiate Hockey Association women's ice hockey season
- League: NCAA Division I
- Sport: Ice hockey
- Duration: September 2012 - March, 2013
- Teams: 8

Regular season

Ice hockey seasons
- 10–11 12–13

The 2012–13 WCHA women's ice hockey season marked the continuation of the annual tradition of competitive ice hockey among Western Collegiate Hockey Association members.

== Regular season ==
=== Standings ===
2012–13 Western Collegiate Hockey Association standings
	Conference								Overall				
	GP	W	L	T	SW	PTS	GF	GA	W	L	T	GF	GA
Minnesota†*	28	28	0	0	0	84	141	27	41	0	0	216	36
Wisconsin	28	17	9	2	2	55	70	46	23	10	2	103	53
North Dakota	28	18	9	1	0	55	96	64	26	12	1	144	88
Minnesota Duluth	28	13	13	2	1	42	72	71	14	16	4	81	85
Ohio State	28	12	13	3	3	42	75	80	19	15	3	107	96
Minnesota State	28	6	17	5	1	24	46	95	10	21	5	69	122
St. Cloud State	28	5	21	2	1	18	37	93	9	24	3	57	113
Bemidji State	28	5	22	1	0	16	40	101	6	26	2	49	127

Source: wcha.com

=== In-season honors ===
==== Players of the week ====
Week	Player of the week
October 3	Amanda Kessel, Minnesota
October 11	Lauren Smith, MSU-Mankato
October 18	Paige Semenza, Ohio State
October 25	Tracy McCann, MSU-Mankato
November 2	
November 9	
November 16	
January 9	Lauren Smith, MSU-Mankato

==== Defensive players of the week ====
Week	Player of the week
October 3	Danielle Butters, Minnesota State University
October 11	Chelsea Knapp, Ohio State
October 18	Kayla Black, Minnesota-Duluth
October 25	Jorid Daginfrud, North Dakota; Noora Raty, Minnesota
November 2	
November 9	
November 16	
January 9	Jessica Havel, Bemidji State

==== Rookies of the week ====
Week	Rookie of the week
October 3	Hannah Brandt, Minnesota
October 11	Maryanne Menefee, Minnesota
October 18	Katie Fitzgerald, St. Cloud State
October 25	Hannah Brandt, Minnesota
November 2	
November 9	
November 16	
January 9	Meghan Dufault, North Dakota

== See also ==
- National Collegiate Women's Ice Hockey Championship
