= Michelle Karvinen =

Finnish ice hockey player (born 1990)

- Born: 27 March 1990 (age 36) Rødovre, Denmark
- Height: 1.67 m (5 ft 6 in)
- Weight: 69 kg (152 lb; 10 st 12 lb)
- Position: Right wing
- Shoots: Left
- PWHL team Former teams: Vancouver Goldeneyes; Frölunda HC; KRS Vanke Rays; Malmö Redhawks; Ladies Team Lugano; Luleå HF/MSSK; Espoo Blues; Rødovre Mighty Bulls
- National team: Finland
- Playing career: 2005–present
Medal record
Olympic Games
| Bronze medal – third place | 2010 Vancouver | Ice hockey |
| Bronze medal – third place | 2018 Pyeongchang | Ice hockey |
| Bronze medal – third place | 2022 Beijing | Ice hockey |
World Championships
| Silver medal – second place | 2019 Finland |
| Bronze medal – third place | 2009 Finland |
| Bronze medal – third place | 2011 Switzerland |
| Bronze medal – third place | 2015 Sweden |
| Bronze medal – third place | 2017 United States |
| Bronze medal – third place | 2021 Canada |
| Bronze medal – third place | 2024 United States |
| Bronze medal – third place | 2025 Czechia |

Michelle Karvinen (born 27 March 1990) is a Danish-Finnish ice hockey player for the Montreal Victoire of the Professional Women's Hockey League (PWHL) and member of the Finnish national team. Karvinen has been described as "the world's best technical player" and she is considered one of the best currently active ice hockey forwards. With the Finnish national team, she has won three Olympic bronze medals and six IIHF Women's World Championship medals, five bronze and one silver.

Karvinen is a two-time Danish Men's Under-20 Champion, two-time Naisten SM-sarja Champion, three-time Swedish Women's Hockey League (SDHL) Champion, and was the 2020–21 Swiss Women's League Champion with HC Lugano. As of 2021, Karvinen ranks second for points recorded in a single SDHL season and is the seventh leading scorer in league history. Her SDHL career was played with Luleå HF/MSSK, and she is the team's all-time point and goal scorer.

== Playing career ==
=== Early career ===
Raised in Rødovre, Denmark, Karvinen began playing with the minor ice hockey teams of Rødovre SIK, where she played on a line with future NHLers Lars Eller and Mikkel Bødker. As a teen, she played with both the club's top junior men's teams and its senior women's team.

=== NCAA ===
She joined the North Dakota Fighting Sioux program in 2010–11. During 15 and 16 October 2011, Karvinen notched five points, and earned a +5 plus/minus rating as North Dakota swept the Vermont Catamounts. In a 9–1 win on 15 October 2011, Karvinen scored two goals and set up another for a three-point performance. She assisted on Jocelyne Lamoureux's game-winning goal at 2:58 of the first period. The following day, she accumulated two more assists in a 4–1 victory. She assisted on the game-winning goal for the second consecutive game, as Monique Lamoureux scored at 15:11 of the second period.

Karvinen played with the North Dakota Fighting Hawks through the 2013–14 season.

=== Professional ===
In 2015, she joined the newly formed club Luleå HF/MSSK of the Riksserien (renamed SDHL in 2016). She scored 79 points in 36 games in her first Riksserien season, setting the single-season league scoring record, as Luleå won the Swedish Championship.

She only played 31 games in the 2016–17 SDHL season, scoring 70 points to finish as the league's top scorer for the second year in a row, 17 points ahead of runner-up Jenn Wakefield. She scored five goals in a December match against Djurgårdens IF. She scored the game-winning goal in the 58th minute of the quarterfinals against Brynäs IF to send Luleå to the semi-finals, where they were defeated by HV71.

Karvinen scored 64 points in 34 games in the 2017–18 SDHL season, leading the league in scoring for the third year in a row. She was named the SDHL Forward of the Year as Luleå won the SDHL championship for the second time in three years. During the season, due to the additional needs of the 2018 Winter Olympics, she had left her job at a communications agency to focus on hockey full-time.

In January 2019, she notched six points in a 14–0 victory over Göteborg HC. The following week, she was suspended for four games after a hit to the head in a match against Djurgården. She finished the 2018–19 season with 56 points in 26 games, finishing fourth in the league in scoring. Luleå lost the first two games of the best-of-five playoff finals series against Linköping HC and were facing knockout in overtime of game four when Karvinen scored the game-winning overtime goal to equalize the series and force a game five. Luleå went on to win the decisive game, earning Karvinen her third SDHL championship title.

In May 2020, SVT Sport reported that Karvinen had reached a verbal agreement to leave Luleå and sign with the Shenzhen KRS Vanke Rays in the Zhenskaya Hockey League (ZhHL), in part due to the potentially full-time salary the club would be able to offer her and in part due to her desire to push her development further. However, as the COVID-19 pandemic created obstacles that made the participation of the KRS Vanke Rays in the 2020–21 ZhHL season uncertain, Karvinen opted to sign with the less risky HC Lugano in Switzerland.

She scored 23 points in the first six games of the 2020–21 SWHL A season, leading the league in scoring before the season was temporarily suspended due to players testing positive for COVID-19. After play resumed, she tallied another 26 points in the remaining ten games of the season, finishing the season with more than 3 points per game and 12 points ahead of the next leading scorer. In the eight games of the playoffs, she added another five goals and seven assists. Assisted by Noemi Ryhner and Nicole Bullo, Karvinen scored the gold winning goal in the 52nd minute of Game 4 to claim Swiss Championship victory for Lugano.

Karvinen declared for the 2025 PWHL Draft and entered the draft as the most established draft-eligible player. She was drafted seventh overall by the Vancouver Goldeneyes. She was signed by Vancouver in October 2025, ahead of their inaugural season, reuniting with her former UND Coach Brian Idalski. On July 23, 2026, Karvinen signed a standard player contract with the reigning PWHL champions Montreal Victoire.

== International play ==
She was the only European selected to the All-Star Team at the 2009 World Championships.

Karvinen scored the gold medal goal against Canadian goaltender Emerance Maschmeyer in the championship game of the 2017 Nations Cup.

She scored 7 points in 7 games at the 2019 IIHF Women's World Championship, serving as an assistant captain and being named to the tournament all-star team as Finland won silver for the first time in the country's history.

On 2 January 2026, she was named to Finland's roster to compete at the 2026 Winter Olympics.

== Personal life ==
Karvinen's father is Finnish, and her mother is Danish. She holds dual Finnish-Danish citizenship. Her brother, Jannik Karvinen, played over 500 games for the Rødovre Mighty Bulls and made a handful of appearances for the Danish men's national team.

Karvinen holds a degree in graphic design and technology from the University of North Dakota. She designed the logo for the 2019 IIHF Women's World Championship, held in Finland, incorporating the silhouette of Finnish legend Riikka Sallinen.

When asked about changing public perception of women's hockey in a 2018 interview, she stated, "We put down the same time and effort, and we need to be treated the same way. It's that simple." She has called for women's professional players to be given living wages, stating that "We have to give 200% of ourselves – 100% at work and another 100% at hockey."

== Career statistics ==
=== Regular season and playoffs ===
| | | | Regular season | | | | | Playoffs |
| Season | Team | League | GP | G | A | Pts | PIM | GP | G | A | Pts | PIM |
|---|---|---|---|---|---|---|---|---|---|---|---|---|
| 2004–05 | Rødovre | KvindeLigaen | — | — | — | — | — | 2 | 2 | 0 | 2 | 4 |
| 2005–06 | Rødovre | KvindeLigaen | 8 | 29 | 22 | 51 | 2 | — | — | — | — | — |
| 2005–06 | Rødovre U20 | Denmark U20 | 2 | 2 | 2 | 4 | 2 | 6 | 0 | 4 | 4 | 2 |
| 2006–07 | Rødovre | KvindeLigaen | 7 | 31 | 12 | 43 | 6 | — | — | — | — | — |
| 2006–07 | Rødovre U20 | Denmark U20 | 22 | 7 | 3 | 10 | 12 | — | — | — | — | — |
| 2006–07 | Rødovre SIK | Division 1 | 5 | 0 | 2 | 2 | 0 | — | — | — | — | — |
| 2007–08 | Espoo Blues | Naisten SM-sarja | 17 | 30 | 32 | 62 | 10 | 9 | 8 | 10 | 18 | 16 |
| 2008–09 | Espoo Blues | Naisten SM-sarja | 22 | 33 | 48 | 81 | 22 | 6 | 8 | 8 | 16 | 6 |
| 2009–10 | Rødovre SIK | Division 1 | 14 | 6 | 8 | 14 | 2 | — | — | — | — | — |
| 2009–10 | Rødovre | KvindeLigaen | 13 | 29 | 9 | 38 | 4 | — | — | — | — | — |
| 2009–10 | Rødovre U20 | Denmark U20 | 11 | 7 | 9 | 16 | 8 | 2 | 3 | 0 | 3 | 0 |
| 2010–11 | Rødovre SIK | Division 1 | 20 | 3 | 8 | 11 | 2 | 12 | 2 | 3 | 5 | 0 |
| 2010–11 | Rødovre | KvindeLigaen | 13 | 43 | 17 | 60 | 10 | — | — | — | — | — |
| 2010–11 | Rødovre U20 | Denmark U20 | 16 | 2 | 12 | 14 | 2 | 5 | 0 | 0 | 0 | 2 |
| 2011–12 | University of North Dakota | WCHA | 36 | 24 | 37 | 61 | 65 | — | — | — | — | — |
| 2012–13 | University of North Dakota | WCHA | 27 | 18 | 29 | 47 | 28 | — | — | — | — | — |
| 2013–14 | University of North Dakota | WCHA | 24 | 14 | 9 | 23 | 20 | — | — | — | — | — |
| 2015–16 | Luleå HF/MSSK | Riksserien | 36 | 37 | 42 | 79 | 26 | 7 | 4 | 4 | 8 | 4 |
| 2016–17 | Luleå HF/MSSK | SDHL | 31 | 30 | 40 | 70 | 20 | 4 | 4 | 2 | 6 | 4 |
| 2017–18 | Luleå HF/MSSK | SDHL | 34 | 30 | 38 | 68 | 26 | 7 | 5 | 10 | 15 | 2 |
| 2018–19 | Luleå HF/MSSK | SDHL | 26 | 25 | 31 | 56 | 24 | 11 | 5 | 13 | 18 | 20 |
| 2019–20 | Luleå HF/MSSK | SDHL | 25 | 19 | 22 | 41 | 14 | 6 | 4 | 8 | 12 | 6 |
| 2020–21 | HC Lugano | SWHL A | 16 | 27 | 22 | 49 | 20 | 8 | 5 | 7 | 12 | 8 |
| 2020–21 | KRS Vanke Rays | ZhHL | – | – | – | – | – | 3 | 3 | 0 | 3 | 4 |
| 2021–22 | Malmö Redhawks (L) | Damettan | 10 | 26 | 21 | 47 | 18 | — | — | — | — | — |
| 2021–22 | KRS Vanke Rays | ZhHL | 10 | 6 | 7 | 13 | 12 | 7 | 5 | 6 | 11 | 6 |
| 2025-26 | Vancouver Goldeneyes | PWHL | 30 | 3 | 6 | 9 | 16 | — | — | — | — | — |
| Naisten SM-sarja totals | | | 39 | 63 | 80 | 143 | 32 | 15 | 16 | 18 | 34 | 22 |
| Denmark U20 totals | | | 51 | 18 | 26 | 44 | 24 | 13 | 3 | 4 | 7 | 4 |
| KvindeLigaen totals | | | 41 | 132 | 60 | 192 | 22 | 2 | 2 | 0 | 2 | 4 |
| Denmark Division 1 totals | | | 39 | 9 | 18 | 27 | 4 | 12 | 2 | 3 | 5 | 0 |
| SDHL totals | | | 152 | 141 | 173 | 314 | 110 | 35 | 22 | 37 | 59 | 36 |

=== International ===
| Year | Team | Event | Result | GP | G | A | Pts | PIM |
|---|---|---|---|---|---|---|---|---|
| 2009 | Finland | WC | 3rd place, bronze medalist(s) | 5 | 5 | 2 | 7 | 6 |
| 2010 | Finland | OG | 3rd place, bronze medalist(s) | 5 | 1 | 2 | 3 | 4 |
| 2011 | Finland | WC | 3rd place, bronze medalist(s) | 6 | 4 | 4 | 8 | 8 |
| 2012 | Finland | WC | 4th | 6 | 0 | 5 | 5 | 4 |
| 2013 | Finland | WC | 4th | 6 | 3 | 1 | 4 | 4 |
| 2014 | Finland | OG | 5th | 6 | 5 | 2 | 7 | 4 |
| 2015 | Finland | WC | 3rd place, bronze medalist(s) | 4 | 2 | 4 | 6 | 2 |
| 2016 | Finland | WC | 4th | 6 | 4 | 1 | 5 | 2 |
| 2017 | Finland | WC | 3rd place, bronze medalist(s) | 6 | 1 | 4 | 5 | 8 |
| 2018 | Finland | OG | 3rd place, bronze medalist(s) | 6 | 3 | 3 | 6 | 2 |
| 2019 | Finland | WC | 2nd place, silver medalist(s) | 7 | 3 | 4 | 7 | 2 |
| 2021 | Finland | WC | 3rd place, bronze medalist(s) | 7 | 0 | 6 | 6 | 0 |
| 2022 | Finland | OG | 3rd place, bronze medalist(s) | 7 | 3 | 4 | 7 | 2 |
| 2022 | Finland | WC | 6th | 7 | 0 | 3 | 3 | 0 |
| 2025 | Finland | WC | 3rd place, bronze medalist(s) | 7 | 2 | 0 | 2 | 2 |
| 2026 | Finland | OG | 6th | 5 | 0 | 1 | 1 | 4 |
| World Championship totals | | | | 67 | 24 | 34 | 58 | 38 |
| Olympic totals | | | | 29 | 12 | 12 | 24 | 16 |

== Awards and honors ==
| Award | Year(s) or Season(s) | ref |
International
| World Championship Bronze Medal | 2009, 2011, 2015, 2017, 2021, 2025 | |
| World Championship All-Star | 2009, 2011, 2019 | |
| Olympic Bronze Medal | 2010, 2018, 2022 | |
| Olympic Best Forward | 2014 | |
| World Championship Silver Medal | 2019 | |
Swiss Women's League
| Swiss Champion | 2020–21 | |
| Most Valuable Player | 2020–21 | |
| Best Forward | 2020–21 | |
| Most Points | 2020–21 | |
| Most Goals | 2020–21 | |
SDHL & Riksserien
| Swedish Champion | 2015–16, 2017–18, 2018–19 | |
| Playoff MVP | 2015–16 | |
| Forward of the Year | 2017–18 | |
| Most Points | 2015–16, 2016–17, 2017–18 | |
Danish Division 1
| Division 1 Champion | 2010–11 | |
Denmark Men's U20
| Danish Junior Champion | 2009–10, 2010–11 | |
Naisten SM-sarja
| Finnish Champion | 2007–08, 2008–09 | |
| All-Star Team | 2007–08, 2008–09 | |
| Player of the Year | 2008–09 | |
| Best Forward | 2008–09 | |
| Most Points | 2008–09 | |
| Most Goals | 2008–09 | |
College
| WCHA Rookie of the Year | 2011–12 | |
| WCHA All-Rookie Team | 2011–12 | |
| All-WCHA Third Team | 2011–12 | |
| All-WCHA Second Team | 2012–13 | |
| All-WCHA First Team | 2013–14 | |
