= Katja Riipi Award =

Finnish ice hockey award

Katja Riipi Award Katja Riipi -palkinto (Finnish)
- Sport: Ice hockey
- League: Auroraliiga
- Awarded for: Best forward
- Presented by: Finnish Ice Hockey Association

History
- First winner: Saara Tuominen, 2006
- Most wins: Elisa Holopainen (6)
- Most recent: Pauliina Salonen, 2026

The Katja Riipi Award (Finnish: Katja Riipi -palkinto) is an ice hockey trophy, seasonally awarded by the Finnish Ice Hockey Association to the best forward of the Auroraliiga (previously called the Naisten SM-sarja and Naisten Liiga). Best forward in the Auroraliiga was first awarded in the 2005–06 season, to Saara Tuominen of Ilves Tampere. The award was named in honor of Katja Riipi during the 2010–11 season.

Twelve players have won the award and, of the twelve, three have won it more than once. Young phenom Elisa Holopainen, a left winger, won the award six times and was the first player to win the award more than two consecutive times. Holopainen's win in 2023 broke the four-win record first set by Linda Välimäki. Välimäki, a centre, first won the trophy in the 2009–10 season, while playing with Ilves Tampere – the team she would later coach during 2020 to 2022. Her later three titles were awarded while playing with the Kiekko-Espoo franchise, winning consecutive trophies in 2014 and 2015, when the team was called the Espoo Blues, and in the 2017, when the team was called Espoo United. Anne Helin, who won the trophy in the 2010–11 season and 2012–13, is the only other player to have been awarded the Katja Riipi Award more than once.

== Award winners ==
Season	Winner	Team
2005–06	Saara Tuominen	Ilves Tampere
2006–07	Karoliina Rantamäki	Espoo Blues
2007–08	Eini Lehtinen	Oulun Kärpät
2008–09	Michelle Karvinen	Espoo Blues
2009–10	Linda Välimäki	Ilves Tampere
2010–11	Anne Helin	Oulun Kärpät
2011–12	Nina Tikkinen	Oulun Kärpät
2012–13	Anne Helin	Oulun Kärpät
2013–14	Linda Välimäki	Espoo Blues
2014–15	Linda Välimäki	Espoo Blues
2015–16	Tanja Niskanen	JYP Jyväskylä
2016–17	Linda Välimäki	Espoo United
2017–18	Petra Nieminen	Team Kuortane
2018–19	Elisa Holopainen	KalPa Kuopio
2019–20	Elisa Holopainen	KalPa Kuopio
2020–21	Elisa Holopainen	KalPa Kuopio
2021–22	Elisa Holopainen	Kiekko-Espoo
2022–23	Elisa Holopainen	KalPa Kuopio
2023–24	Elisa Holopainen	KalPa Kuopio
2024–25	Lisette Täks	Kiekko-Espoo
2025–26	Pauliina Salonen	IFK Helsinki

Source: Elite Prospects

== All-time award recipients ==
Player	Wins	Year(s) won
Elisa Holopainen	6	2019, 2020, 2021, 2022, 2023, 2024
Linda Välimäki	4	2010, 2014, 2015, 2017
Anne Helin	2	2011, 2013
Michelle Karvinen	1	2009
Eini Lehtinen	1	2008
Petra Nieminen	1	2018
Tanja Niskanen	1	2016
Karoliina Rantamäki	1	2007
Pauliina Salonen	1	2026
Nina Tikkinen	1	2012
Saara Tuominen	1	2006
Lisette Täks	1	2025
