= Elisa Holopainen =

Finnish ice hockey player (born 2001)

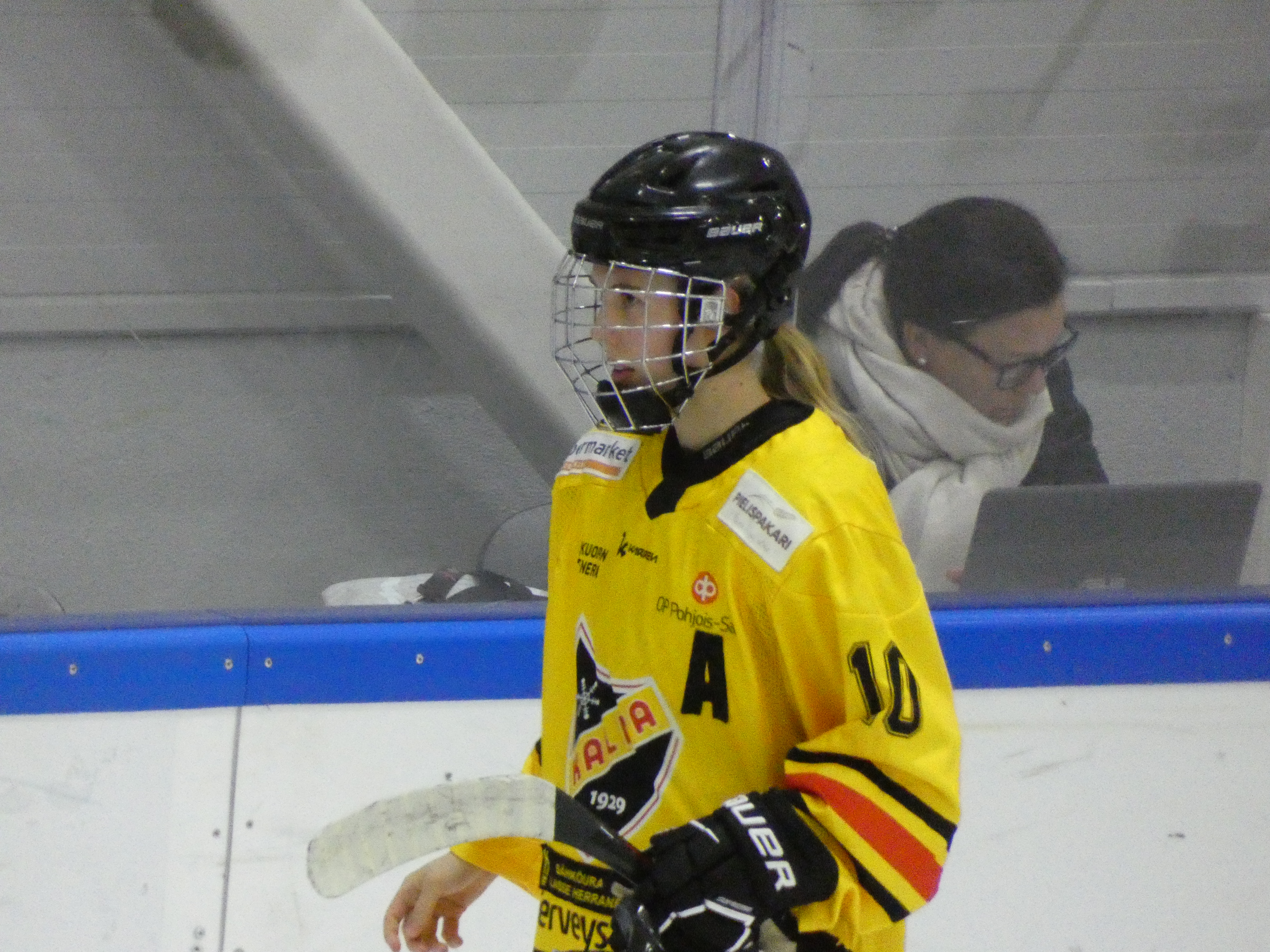
- Holopainen with KalPa in October 2022
- Born: 27 December 2001 (age 24) Tuusniemi, Finland
- Height: 1.65 m (5 ft 5 in)
- Weight: 55 kg (121 lb; 8 st 9 lb)
- Position: Left wing
- Shoots: Left
- SDHL team Former teams: Frölunda HC; KalPa Kuopio; Kiekko-Espoo
- National team: Finland
- Playing career: 2016–present
Medal record
Olympic Games
Bronze medal – third place	2022 Beijing	Ice hockey
World Championship
Silver medal – second place	2019 Finland
Bronze medal – third place	2021 Canada
Bronze medal – third place	2024 United States
Bronze medal – third place	2025 Czechia

Elisa Holopainen (born 27 December 2001) is a Finnish ice hockey winger for Frölunda HC of the Swedish Women's Hockey League (SDHL) and member of the Finnish national team.

Holopainen represented Finland in the women's ice hockey tournament at the 2022 Winter Olympics in Beijing, where she won a bronze medal, and at the IIHF Women's World Championships in 2019, 2021, 2022, 2024, and 2025.

She was drafted by the New York Sirens in second round of the 2026 PWHL Draft.

== Playing career ==
Holopainen was one of the Naisten Liiga's most dominant players during her eight seasons in the league. She was named the Naisten Liiga Player of the Year four times, Best Forward six times, and was a six-time All-Star team selection. In the 2026 PWHL Draft, she was selected in the second round, 19th overall, by the New York Sirens.

== International play ==
With the senior national team, she won a silver medal at the 2019 IIHF Women's World Championship. Holopainen was officially named to the Finnish roster for the 2020 IIHF Women's World Championship days before the tournament was cancelled due to public health concerns related to COVID-19.

She appeared with the Finnish under-18 national team at the IIHF Women's U18 World Championships in 2017, 2018, and 2019. Finland claimed the bronze medal at the 2019 IIHF World Women's U18 Championship, due in no small part to Holopainen's tournament leading 8 points from 5 goals and three assists in five games. She was named Best Forward by the tournament directorate and selected to the media All-Star team, in addition to being recognized as a top-3 player for Finland by the coaches.

On 2 January 2026, she was named to Finland's roster to compete at the 2026 Winter Olympics.

== Career statistics ==
=== Regular season and playoffs ===
			Regular season					Playoffs
Season	Team	League	GP	G	A	Pts	PIM	GP	G	A	Pts	PIM
2014–15	KalPa U16 Tytöt	U16 Aluesarja	16	13	8	21	0	–	–	–	–	–
2015–16	KalPa U16 Tytöt	U16 Aluesarja	18	50	12	62	2	–	–	–	–	–
2016–17	KalPa	NSMs	26	19	9	28	8	9	1	2	3	6
2017–18	KalPa	NSML	28	17	25	42	6	4	2	0	2	2
2018–19	KalPa	NSML	20	21	30	51	8	8	11	4	15	0
2019–20	KalPa	NSML	30	37	25	62	20	6	4	4	8	0
2020–21	KalPa	NSML	35	39	25	64	10	11	12	9	21	6
2021–22	Kiekko-Espoo	NSML	27	29	27	56	4	12	19	10	29	14
2022–23	KalPa	NSML	28	41	34	75	4	0	0	0	0	0
2023–24	KalPa	NSML	19	32	25	57	6	8	9	5	14	6
Naisten Liiga totals			203	235	200	435	66	58	58	34	92	34

=== International ===
Year	Team	Event	Result	GP	G	A	Pts	PIM
2017	Finland	U18	5th	5	0	1	1	4
2018	Finland	U18	5th	5	1	6	7	0
2019	Finland	U18	3rd place, bronze medalist(s)	6	5	3	8	6
2019	Finland	WC	2nd place, silver medalist(s)	7	2	1	3	0
2021	Finland	WC	3rd place, bronze medalist(s)	7	1	1	2	2
2022	Finland	OG	3rd place, bronze medalist(s)	7	1	3	4	4
2022	Finland	WC	6th	7	4	2	6	2
2024	Finland	WC	3rd place, bronze medalist(s)	7	2	1	3	0
2025	Finland	WC	3rd place, bronze medalist(s)	7	3	2	5	2
2026	Finland	OG	6th	5	0	0	0	0
Junior totals				16	6	10	16	10
Senior totals				47	13	10	23	10

== Honors and achievements ==
Award	Year or period
Naisten Liiga
All-Star Second Team	2017–18
Player of the Month	January 2019
Player of the Month	September 2020
Player of the Month	November 2021
Player of the Month	November 2022
Player of the Month	November 2023
All-Star First Team	2018–19
All-Star First Team	2019–20
All-Star First Team	2020–21
All-Star First Team	2021–22
All-Star First Team	2022–23
All-Star First Team	2023–24
Riikka Nieminen Award (Player of the Year)	2018–19
Riikka Nieminen Award (Player of the Year)	2020–21
Riikka Nieminen Award (Player of the Year)	2022–23
Riikka Nieminen Award (Player of the Year)	2023–24
Katja Riipi Award (Best forward)	2018–19
Katja Riipi Award (Best forward)	2019–20
Katja Riipi Award (Best forward)	2020–21
Katja Riipi Award (Best forward)	2021–22
Katja Riipi Award (Best forward)	2022–23
Katja Riipi Award (Best forward)	2023–24
Marianne Ihalainen Award (Leading scorer)	2018–19
Tiia Reima Award (Top goal scorer)	2018–19
Tiia Reima Award (Top goal scorer)	2019–20
Tiia Reima Award (Top goal scorer)	2022–23
Finnish Championship Silver Medal	2021
Aurora Borealis Cup Champion	2022
Finnish Championship Bronze Medal	2023
Finnish Championship Bronze Medal	2024
International
World U18 Top-3 Player on Team	2018, 2019
World U18 All-Star Team	2019
World U18 Best Forward	2019
World U18 Bronze Medal	2019
World U18 Leading Scorer	2019
World Championship Silver Medal	2019
World Championship Bronze Medal	2021, 2024, 2025
Olympic Bronze Medal	2022
