= Hanna Olsson =

Swedish ice hockey player (born 1999)

- Born: 20 January 1999 (age 27) Öckerö, Sweden
- Height: 1.73 m (5 ft 8 in)
- Weight: 69 kg (152 lb; 10 st 12 lb)
- Position: Forward
- Shoots: Left
- SDHL team Former teams: Frölunda HC: HV71; Djurgårdens IF; Linköping HC; Skärgårdens SK
- National team: Sweden
- Playing career: 2012–present

Hanna Olsson (born 20 January 1999) is a Swedish ice hockey player and captain of Frölunda HC in the Swedish Women's Hockey League (SDHL). She is also a member of the Swedish national team. She is considered one of the best young Swedish players and was already the seventeenth all-time scorer in SDHL history at 21 years of age.

== Playing career ==
Olsson played for the Skärgårdens SK boys' teams until she was 16. From 2013 to 2015, she split her time between the team and various Riksserien (renamed SDHL in 2016) teams. She made her Riksserien debut in 2013 with HV71 Dam and picked up 3 points in 8 games during the 2012–13 season.

She scored 31 points in 27 games in the 2016–17 season as Djurgårdens IF won the SDHL championship for the first time. She had been due to move to North America the following year to join the University of North Dakota, however the university cut their women's hockey programme in 2017.

She scored 28 points in 26 games in the 2018–19 season. In December 2018, she publicly criticised the organisation's supporter club, Järnkaminerna, for not doing enough to support the women's side, despite the club supposedly having the "best supporters in Sweden." In February 2019, she broke her contract with Djurgården, citing frustration with her development as a player. After the club barred her from joining another SDHL club for the rest of the season, she returned to Skärgårdens SK to train with their senior men's team, which plays in the fifth tier of Swedish men's hockey. Luleå HF/MSSK had attempted to negotiate a transfer for her rights, however they backed off after they felt Djurgården set the transfer fee too high.

Ahead of the 2019–20 season, she signed with HV71. After scoring 46 points in 34 games, including a career-best 21 goals and top among all Swedish players, she was nominated for the Forward of the Year award. She scored the first goal of the game in her return to Djurgården in September, with HV71 winning the match 4–1.

She injured her ACL in practice before the start of the 2020–21 SDHL season and missed the entire season while recovering.

Olsson served as captain of HV71 during the 2021–22 SDHL season.

== International play ==
She represented Sweden in the women's ice hockey tournament at the 2018 Winter Olympics, getting one assist in six games as Sweden finished in seventh. She has also played for Sweden at several World Championships.

On 12 January 2026, she was named to Sweden's roster to compete at the 2026 Winter Olympics. In the quarterfinals of the 2026 Olympics, Olsson had the game winning goal as Sweden eliminated Czechia in a 2-0 win.
