= Riikka Nieminen Award =

Finnish ice hockey award

Riikka Nieminen Award Riikka Nieminen -palkinto (Finnish)
- Sport: Ice hockey
- League: Auroraliiga
- Awarded for: Player of the Year
- Presented by: Finnish Ice Hockey Association

History
- First award: 2008
- First winner: Michelle Karvinen
- Most wins: Jenni Hiirikoski (5)
- Most recent: Emma Nuutinen, 2026

The Riikka Nieminen Award (Finnish: Riikka Nieminen -palkinto) is an ice hockey trophy, seasonally awarded by the Finnish Ice Hockey Association to the Auroraliiga Player of the Year. It is named after Riikka Sallinen (née Nieminen), now retired, who is widely considered the best European women’s ice hockey player to ever compete internationally.

The trophy was first awarded for the 2008–09 season and Michelle Karvinen of the Espoo Blues was the first recipient.

Jenni Hiirikoski is the only defenceman to ever win the trophy and holds the record for most wins, with five.

Elisa Holopainen is winningest forward, having claimed the trophy in the 2018–19 season, 2020–21 season, 2022–23 season, and 2023–24 season. Forward Emma Nuutinen is the only other player to have won the award more than once, receiving it for both the 2024–25 season and the 2025–26 season.

The only goaltender to have won the award is Anni Keisala in the 2021–22 season.

== Award winners ==
Season	Winner	Team
2008–09	Michelle Karvinen	Espoo Blues
2009–10	Jenni Hiirikoski	Ilves Tampere
2010–11	Anne Helin	Kärpät Oulu
2011–12	Nina Tikkinen	Kärpät Oulu
2012–13	Jenni Hiirikoski	JYP Jyväskylä
2013–14	Jenni Hiirikoski	JYP Jyväskylä
2014–15	Jenni Hiirikoski	JYP Jyväskylä
2015–16	Jenni Hiirikoski	JYP Jyväskylä
2016–17	Isa Rahunen	Kärpät Oulu
2017–18	Linda Välimäki	Ilves Tampere
2018–19	Elisa Holopainen	KalPa Kuopio
2019–20	Tanja Niskanen	KalPa Kuopio
2020–21	Elisa Holopainen	KalPa Kuopio
2021–22	Anni Keisala	Ilves Tampere
2022–23	Elisa Holopainen	KalPa Kuopio
2023–24	Elisa Holopainen	KalPa Kuopio
2024–25	Emma Nuutinen	Kiekko-Espoo
2025–26	Emma Nuutinen	Kiekko-Espoo

Source: Elite Prospects

== All time award recipients ==
Player	Wins	Year(s) won
Jenni Hiirikoski	5	2010, 2013, 2014, 2015, 2016
Elisa Holopainen	4	2019, 2021, 2023, 2024
Emma Nuutinen	2	2025, 2026
Anne Helin	1	2011
Michelle Karvinen	1	2009
Anni Keisala	1	2022
Tanja Niskanen	1	2020
Isa Rahunen	1	2017
Nina Tikkinen	1	2012
Linda Välimäki	1	2018
