= Brian Idalski =

American ice hockey coach

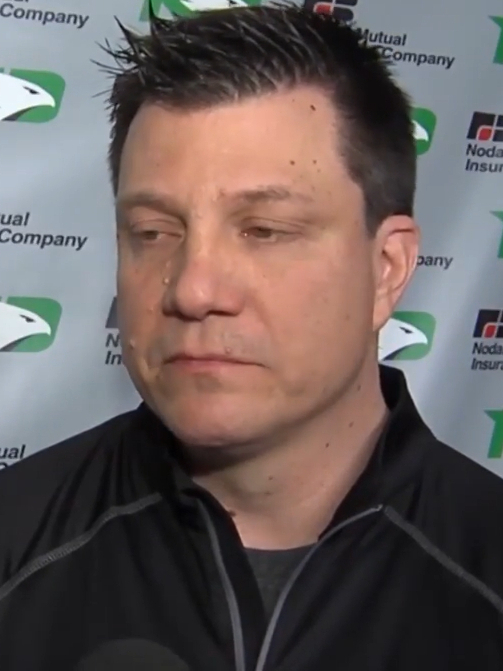
- Idalski in 2017

Current position
- Title: Head Coach
- Team: Syracuse
- Conference: AHA
- Record: 0–0–0

Biographical details
- Born: January 23, 1971 (age 55); Warren, Michigan, United States
- Education: University of Wisconsin–Stevens Point

Coaching career (HC unless noted)
- 1999–2000: Columbus Cottonmouths (CHL) (asst)
- 2000–2001: Wisconsin–Stevens Point (men's asst)
- 2001–2006: Wisconsin–Stevens Point
- 2006–2007: St. Cloud State (asst)
- 2007–2017: North Dakota
- 2019–2022: Shenzhen KRS Vanke Rays
- 2021–2022: China women's national team
- 2022–2025: St. Cloud State
- 2025–2026: Vancouver Goldeneyes
- 2026–: Syracuse
- 2026–: Czechia women’s national team

Brian Idalski (born January 23, 1971) is an American ice hockey coach who is currently the head coach of the Syracuse Orange women's ice hockey team and the Czechia women's national team. He previously served as the head coach for North Dakota and St. Cloud State.

== Career ==
In April 2007, he was named head coach of the University of North Dakota women's ice hockey team, a position he held for ten years.

He was head coach of the Chinese women's team the Shenzhen KRS Vanke Rays in the Zhenskaya Hockey League (ZhHL) from 2019 to 2022, twice winning the ZhHL Championship with the team. Idalski also served as head coach of the Chinese women's national team that participated in the women's ice hockey tournament at the 2022 Winter Olympics in Beijing. The team qualified as the national host country.

Idalski was hired as the head coach of the St. Cloud State Huskies women's ice hockey team in April 2022.

On June 23, 2025, Idalski was named the inaugural head coach for the Vancouver Goldeneyes and was fired following the conclusion of the 2025–26 PWHL season.

Idalski was announced as the head coach of the Syracuse Orange women's ice hockey team on July 14, 2026.

== Head coaching record ==
Record table
Season	Team	Overall	Conference	Standing	Postseason
Wisconsin–Stevens Point (NCHA) (2001–2006)
2001–02	Wisconsin–Stevens Point	26–1–0	15–1–0	1st	
2002–03	Wisconsin–Stevens Point	20–5–2	12–3–1	2nd	
2003–04	Wisconsin–Stevens Point	19–7–4	11–4–0	t-2nd	
2004–05	Wisconsin–Stevens Point	22–3–1	9–0–1	1st	
2005–06	Wisconsin–Stevens Point	21–5–4	11–1–3	1st	
Wisconsin–Stevens Point:		108–21–11	58–9–6		
North Dakota (WCHA) (2007–2017)
2007–08	North Dakota	4–26–6	4–20–4	7th	
2008–09	North Dakota	13–19–4	9–16–3	T-5th	
2009–10	North Dakota	8–22–4	7–19–2	8th	
2010–11	North Dakota	20–13–3	16–10–2	4th	
2011–12	North Dakota	22–12–3	16–9–3	3rd	NCAA first round
2012–13	North Dakota	26–12–1	18–9–1	2nd	NCAA first round
2013–14	North Dakota	20–12–4	14–10–4	3rd	
2014–15	North Dakota	22–12–3	16–9–3	3rd	
2015–16	North Dakota	18–12–5	13–10–5	4th	
2016–17	North Dakota	16–16–6	11–12–5	4th	
North Dakota:		169–156–39	124–124–32		
KRS Vanke Rays (ZhHL) (2019–2022)
2019–20	KRS Vanke Rays	20–5–2		1st	champion
2020–21	KRS Vanke Rays	24–2–2		1st	runner-up
2021–22	KRS Vanke Rays	24–6–4		2nd	champion
KRS Vanke Rays:		68–13–8			
St. Cloud State (WCHA) (2022–2025)
2022–23	St. Cloud State	18–18–1		5th	
2023–24	St. Cloud State	17–17–2		5th	
2024–25	St. Cloud State	15–15–6		5th	
St. Cloud State:		50–50–9			
Vancouver Goldeneyes (PWHL) (2025–2026)
2025–26	Vancouver Goldeneyes	9-3-4-14 (W-OTW-OTL-L)		6th	
Total:		407–258–67			
National champion Postseason invitational champion Conference regular season champion Conference regular season and conference tournament champion Division regular season champion Division regular season and conference tournament champion Conference tournament champion

== See also ==
- List of college women's ice hockey career coaching wins leaders

Preceded by Jason Lesteberg	Wisconsin–Stevens Point Women's Head Coach; 2001–2006	Succeeded by Ann Ninnemann
Preceded by Dennis Miller (interim)	North Dakota Women's Head Coach; 2007–2017	Succeeded by Program cut
Preceded by Mike LaZazzera	Shenzhen KRS Vanke Rays Head Coach; 2019–2022	Succeeded by Scott Spencer
Preceded by Steve Macdonald	St. Cloud State Women's Head Coach; 2022–2025	Succeeded by Mira Jalosuo
Preceded by Team established	Vancouver Goldeneyes Head Coach; 2025–2026	Succeeded by Vacant
Preceded by Britni Smith	Syracuse Women's Head Coach; 2026–	Succeeded by Incumbent
