= 2012–13 Minnesota Golden Gophers women's ice hockey season =

WCHA Regular Season WCHA Postseason NCAA Frozen Four, Champions
- Conference: 1 WCHA
- Home ice: Ridder Arena

Rankings
- USA Today/USA Hockey Magazine: 1
- USCHO.com/CBS College Sports: 1

Record
- Overall: 41–0–0
- Home: 23–0–0
- Road: 18–0–0

Coaches and captains
- Head coach: Brad Frost
- Assistant coaches: Joel Johnson; Nadine Muzerall
- Captain(s): Megan Bozek; Bethany Brausen

The 2012–13 Minnesota Golden Gophers women's ice hockey season represented the University of Minnesota during the 2012–13 NCAA Division I women's ice hockey season. They were coached by Brad Frost in his sixth season. The Gophers hosted the 2013 NCAA Frozen Four and repeated as national champions.

Notably, the Gophers were the first ice hockey team in the history of today's NCAA Division I, of either sex, to complete an undefeated season. The last NCAA ice hockey team to complete an unbeaten season was the 1983–84 Bemidji State men's team, which then competed in Division II, a level that no longer holds a championship (the Beavers now compete in Division I hockey). The last team in the top level of NCAA ice hockey with an unbeaten season was the 1969–70 Cornell men's team, competing in the University Division, predecessor to today's Division I.

== Offseason ==
=== Recruiting ===
Player	Position	Nationality	Notes
Hannah Brandt	Forward	United States	Winner of 2012 Minnesota Ms. Hockey Award
Brook Garzone	Forward	United States	Attended Shattuck-Saint Mary's
Amanda Leveille	Goaltender	Canada	Hails from Kingston, Ontario
Milica McMillen	Defense	United States	Attended the Breck School
Maryanne Menefee	Forward	United States	Attended Lansing Eastern High School
Lee Stecklein	Defense	United States	Attended Roseville Area High School

== Regular season ==
=== Standings ===
2012–13 Western Collegiate Hockey Association standings
	Conference								Overall				
	GP	W	L	T	SW	PTS	GF	GA	W	L	T	GF	GA
Minnesota†*	28	28	0	0	0	84	141	27	41	0	0	216	36
Wisconsin	28	17	9	2	2	55	70	46	23	10	2	103	53
North Dakota	28	18	9	1	0	55	96	64	26	12	1	144	88
Minnesota Duluth	28	13	13	2	1	42	72	71	14	16	4	81	85
Ohio State	28	12	13	3	3	42	75	80	19	15	3	107	96
Minnesota State	28	6	17	5	1	24	46	95	10	21	5	69	122
St. Cloud State	28	5	21	2	1	18	37	93	9	24	3	57	113
Bemidji State	28	5	22	1	0	16	40	101	6	26	2	49	127

Source: wcha.com

=== Schedule ===
Date	Time	Opponent^{#}	Rank^{#}	Site	Decision	Result	Attendance	Record
Regular Season
September 28	7:07	Colgate*	#1	Ridder Arena • Minneapolis, MN	Räty	W 7–0	707	1–0–0
September 29	4:07	Colgate*	#1	Ridder Arena • Minneapolis, MN	Leveille	W 11–0	633	2–0–0
October 5	7:07	St. Cloud State	#1	Ridder Arena • Minneapolis, MN	Räty	W 7–1	1,051	3–0–0 (1–0–0)
October 6	4:07	St. Cloud State	#1	Ridder Arena • Minneapolis, MN	Räty	W 4–0	785	4–0–0 (2–0–0)
October 12	6:00	at St. Lawrence*	#1	Appleton Arena • Canton, NY	Räty	W 5–0	295	5–0–0 (2–0–0)
October 13	3:00	at St. Lawrence*	#1	Appleton Arena • Canton, NY	Räty	W 6–0	279	6–0–0 (2–0–0)
October 19	7:07	#6 Ohio State	#1	Ridder Arena • Minneapolis, MN	Räty	W 7–2	956	7–0–0 (3–0–0)
October 20	1:07	#6 Ohio State	#1	Ridder Arena • Minneapolis, MN	Räty	W 8–0	824	8–0–0 (4–0–0)
October 27	2:07	at #8 North Dakota	#1	Ralph Engelstad Arena • Grand Forks, ND	Räty	W 5–1	3,591	9–0–0 (5–0–0)
October 28	2:07	at #8 North Dakota	#1	Ralph Engelstad Arena • Grand Forks, ND	Räty	W 4–2	1,289	10–0–0 (6–0–0)
November 2	7:07	at Minnesota Duluth	#1	AMSOIL Arena • Duluth, MN	Räty	W 4–1	1,267	11–0–0 (7–0–0)
November 3	7:07	at Minnesota Duluth	#1	AMSOIL Arena • Duluth, MN	Räty	W 4–0	1,493	12–0–0 (8–0–0)
November 16	4:07	Minnesota State	#1	Ridder Arena • Minneapolis, MN	Räty	W 3–0	947	13–0–0 (9–0–0)
November 17	4:07	Minnesota State	#1	Ridder Arena • Minneapolis, MN	Räty	W 9–1	1,558	14–0–0 (10–0–0)
November 24	1:00	at New Hampshire*	#1	Whittemore Center • Durham, NH	Räty	W 10–2	761	15–0–0 (10–0–0)
November 25, 2012	2:00	at New Hampshire*	#1	Whittemore Center • Durham, NH	Räty	W 4–0	465	16–0–0 (10–0–0)
December 1	2:07	#10 Wisconsin	#1	Ridder Arena • Minneapolis, MN	Räty	W 4–1	3,400	17–0–0 (11–0–0)
December 2	2:00	#10 Wisconsin	#1	Ridder Arena • Minneapolis, MN	Räty	W 2–0	2,132	18–0–0 (12–0–0)
December 7	7:07	at Bemidji State	#1	Sanford Center • Bemidji, MN	Räty	W 5–1	310	19–0–0 (13–0–0)
December 8	4:07	at Bemidji State	#1	Sanford Center • Bemidji, MN	Räty	W 5–0	305	20–0–0 (14–0–0)
January 11	7:07	North Dakota	#1	Ridder Arena • Minneapolis, MN	Räty	W 6–3	2,014	21–0–0 (15–0–0)
January 12	4:00	North Dakota	#1	Ridder Arena • Minneapolis, MN	Räty	W 6–3	2,703	22–0–0 (16–0–0)
January 18	7:07	at Minnesota State	#1	Verizon Wireless Center • Mankato, MN	Räty	W 8–1	513	23–0–0 (17–0–0)
January 19	3:07	at Minnesota State	#1	Verizon Wireless Center • Mankato, MN	Räty	W 6–0	463	24–0–0 (18–0–0)
January 25	2:00	at #8 Wisconsin	#1	LaBahn Arena • Madison, WI	Räty	W 2–0	1,791	25–0–0 (19–0–0)
January 27	2:07	at #8 Wisconsin	#1	LaBahn Arena • Madison, WI	Räty	W 5–1	2,273	26–0–0 (20–0–0)
February 1	6:07	#10 Minnesota Duluth	#1	Ridder Arena • Minneapolis, MN	Räty	W 5–0	2,538	27–0–0 (21–0–0)
February 2	2:36	#10 Minnesota Duluth	#1	Ridder Arena • Minneapolis, MN	Räty	W 6–2	3,017	28–0–0 (22–0–0)
February 8	6:07	at Ohio State	#1	Ohio State University Ice Rink • Columbus, OH	Räty	W 5–2	365	29–0–0 (23–0–0)
February 9	1:07	at Ohio State	#1	Ohio State University Ice Rink • Columbus, OH	Räty	W 5–3	392	30–0–0 (24–0–0)
February 15	7:07	Bemidji State	#1	Ridder Arena • Minneapolis, MN	Räty	W 8–0	2,087	31–0–0 (25–0–0)
February 16	4:07	Bemidji State	#1	Ridder Arena • Minneapolis, MN	Räty	W 3–2 ^{OT}	2,360	32–0–0 (26–0–0)
February 22	7:07	at St. Cloud State	#1	Herb Brooks National Hockey Center • St. Cloud, MN	Leveille	W 2–0	330	33–0–0 (27–0–0)
February 23	2:07	at St. Cloud State	#1	Herb Brooks National Hockey Center • St. Cloud, MN	Räty	W 3–0	518	34–0–0 (28–0–0)
WCHA Tournament
March 1	6:07	Bemidji State*	#1	Ridder Arena • Minneapolis, MN (First Round, Game 1)	Räty	W 5–0	1,523	35–0–0
March 2	4:07	Bemidji State*	#1	Ridder Arena • Minneapolis, MN (First Round, Game 2)	Räty	W 8–0	2,039	36–0–0
March 8	7:00	Ohio State*	#1	Ridder Arena • Minneapolis, MN (WCHA Final Faceoff)	Räty	W 5–0	2,024	37–0–0
March 9	7:07	#7 North Dakota*	#1	Ridder Arena • Minneapolis, MN (WCHA Final Faceoff)	Räty	W 2–0	2,286	38–0–0
NCAA Tournament
March 16	4:00	#6 North Dakota*	#1	Ridder Arena • Minneapolis, MN (First Round)	Räty	W 3–2 ^{3OT}	2,750	39–0–0
March 22	5:00	#4 Boston College*	#1	Ridder Arena • Minneapolis, MN (Frozen Four)	Räty	W 3–2 ^{OT}	3,400	40–0–0
March 24	3:04	#2 Boston University*	#1	Ridder Arena • Minneapolis, MN (NCAA Championship)	Räty	W 6–3	3,400	41–0–0
*Non-conference game. ^{#}Rankings from USCHO.com Poll.

=== Roster ===
No.	Nat.	Player	Class	Pos	Height	DoB	Hometown	Previous team
2		Lee Stecklein	Freshman	D	5' 11" (1.8 m)	1994-04-23	Roseville, Minnesota	Roseville Area High School
3		Samantha Downey	Senior	F	5' 9" (1.75 m)	1991-02-19	Silver Bay, Minnesota	Proctor High School
4		Becky Kortum	Senior	F	5' 7" (1.7 m)	1991-05-07	Minnetonka, Minnesota	Hopkins High School
5		Rachel Ramsey	Sophomore	D	6' 0" (1.83 m)	1992-10-14	Chanhassen, Minnesota	Minnetonka High School
6		Katie Frischmann	Senior	F/D	5' 5" (1.65 m)	1991-01-06	Rochester, Minnesota	Minnesota Thoroughbreds
7		Mira Jalosuo	Senior	D	6' 0" (1.83 m)	1989-02-03	Lieksa, Finland	Finland women's national ice hockey team
8		Amanda Kessel	Junior	F	5' 6" (1.68 m)	1991-08-28	Madison, Wisconsin	Shattuck-Saint Mary's
9		Sarah Davis	Junior	F	5' 4" (1.63 m)	1988-04-24	Paradise, Newfoundland	Warner Hockey School
10		Kelly Terry	Junior	F	5' 6" (1.68 m)	1992-06-06	Whitby, Ontario	Sinclair Secondary School
13		Milica McMillen	Freshman	D	5' 10" (1.78 m)	1993-07-13	Saint Paul, Minnesota	Breck School
14		Maryanne Menefee	Freshman	F	5' 6" (1.68 m)	1994-01-30	Lansing, Michigan	Lansing Eastern High School
15		Rachael Bona	Sophomore	F	5' 5" (1.65 m)	1992-10-25	Coon Rapids, Minnesota	Coon Rapids High School
16		Bethany Brausen	Junior	F	5' 5" (1.65 m)	1992-05-16	Little Canada, Minnesota	Roseville Area High School
17		Jordyn Burns	Sophomore	D/F	5' 7" (1.7 m)	1992-09-29	Chanhassen, Minnesota	Benilde-St. Margaret's
18		Brook Garzone	Freshman	F	5' 6" (1.68 m)	1993-04-29	Sand Springs, Oklahoma	Shattuck-Saint Mary's
19		Megan Bozek	Senior	D	5' 9" (1.75 m)	1991-03-27	Buffalo Grove, Illinois	Chicago Mission
20		Meghan Lorence	Sophomore	F	5' 7" (1.7 m)	1992-06-25	Mounds View, Minnesota	Irondale High School
22		Hannah Brandt	Freshman	F	5' 6" (1.68 m)	1993-11-27	Vadnais Heights, Minnesota	Hill-Murray School
27		Baylee Gillanders	Junior	D	5' 11" (1.8 m)	1992-08-09	Kyle, Saskatchewan	Warner Hockey School
29		Amanda Leveille	Freshman	G	5' 7" (1.7 m)	1994-06-10	Kingston, Ontario	Frontenac Secondary School
31		Shyler Sletta	Sophomore	G	5' 5" (1.65 m)	1993-05-22	Elko New Market, Minnesota	New Prague High School
41		Noora Räty	Senior	G	5' 5" (1.65 m)	1989-05-29	Espoo, Finland	Finland women's national ice hockey team

== Awards and honors ==
- Hannah Brandt, WCHA Rookie of the Week (Week of October 3, 2012)
- Hannah Brandt, WCHA Rookie of the Week (Week of October 25, 2012)
- Amanda Kessel, WCHA Player of the Week (Week of October 3, 2012)
- Amanda Kessel, Patty Kazmaier Award
- Maryanne Menefee, WCHA Rookie of the Week (Week of October 10, 2012)
- Noora Raty, WCHA Co-Defensive Player of the Week (Week of October 25, 2012)
