= 2009–10 North Dakota Fighting Sioux women's ice hockey season =

- Conference: WCHA

Rankings
- USA Today/USA Hockey Magazine: Not ranked
- USCHO.com/CBS College Sports: Not ranked

Record
- Overall: 1-1-0
- Road: 1-1-0

Coaches and captains
- Head coach: Brian Idalski
- Assistant coaches: Courtney Drennen; Maria Lewis
- Captain: Kelly Lewis
- Alternate captain(s): Cassandra Flanagan, Stephanie Roy

The 2009-10 North Dakota Fighting Sioux women's ice hockey season took place under head coach Brian Idalski.

== Offseason ==
- July 9: University of North Dakota women's ice hockey transfers Monique Lamoureux and Jocelyne Lamoureux were selected as part of 41 players to participate in the 2009 USA Hockey Women's National Festival, which took place August 18–24 in Blaine, Minnesota. It served as the selection camp for the 2009-10 United States women's national ice hockey team competed in the Qwest Tour, a 10-game domestic tour that began Sept. 25 and ended just prior to the start of the 2010 Olympic Winter Games in Vancouver, British Columbia.
- August 6: Director of athletics Brian Faison announced the resignation of women's hockey assistant coach Grant Kimball, who accepted the position of associate head coach with the University of Vermont's women's hockey program.
- August 11: Head coach Brian Idalski announced the hiring of Courtney Drennen on Tuesday as an interim assistant coach for the 2009-10 season. Drennen came to UND after spending the last four seasons as a goaltender in the Mercyhurst College program.
- September 9: The WCHA announced that North Dakota defenseman Kelly Lewis and forward Alyssa Wiebe were named as WCHA All-Stars. The two players are among 22 players from the conference to face the 2009-10 U.S Women's National Team in St. Paul, Minn. on September 25.

== Exhibition ==
Date	Opponent	Location	Time	Score
Fri, Sep 25	Manitoba	Grand Forks, N.D.	7:07 p.m.	ND, 3-1
Sat, Sep 26	Manitoba	Grand Forks, N.D.	4:07 p.m.	Man, 3-2
Sat, Oct 10	U.S. Olympic Team (Exhibition)	at Warroad, Minn.	7:00 p.m.	USA, 11-1
Sat, Nov 21	Manitoba Maple Leafs	Grand Forks, N.D.	7:07 p.m.	ND, 9-0

== Regular season ==
- October 9: The U.S. Women's National Team took on North Dakota in Warroad, Minnesota, in the second game of the Qwest Tour. It was a preview for the North Dakota program and U.S. players Jocelyne and Monique Lamoureux, who joined the Fighting Sioux in the next season.
- March 3: The University announced the hiring of longtime coach of the Swedish Women's National Team Peter Elander as an associate coach for the 2010-11 season.

=== Players ===
- Senior Cassandra Flanagan finished her Sioux career second all-time in games played (142).
- Sara Dagenais led the Fighting Sioux in goals this season with 10.
- Alyssa Wiebe, led the Sioux with 30 points (9 goals, 21 assists). Her 21 assists this season set a new program record for most assists in a single season.
- Goalie Jordi Dagfinrud set single-season records in goals against average (2.39) and save percentage (.923).

=== Standings ===
{{2009–10 WCHA standings (women)|team = UND}}

=== Roster ===
Number	Name	Position	Height	Class
2	Loken, Mary	F	5-6	Fr.
3	Babchishin, Janet	F	5-6	Jr.
5	Perkins, Holly	F	5-3	Fr.
6	Parizek, Allison	F	5-4	Fr.
7	Slavin, Jordan	D	5-10	Fr.
8	Fellner, Susanne	D	5-3	Sr.
12	Holmes, Ashley	D	5-9	So.
13	Wiebe, Alyssa	F	5-7	So.
15	Gilbert, Megan	F	5-7	Fr.
16	Flanagan, Cassandra	D	5-7 Sr.	
17	Moir, Alanna	D	5-6	Fr.
18	Lamoureux, Jocelyne	F	5-6	So.
19	Miller, Margot	F	5-9	So.
20	Lewis, Kelly	D	5-3	Jr.
21	Ketcher, Kelsey	F	5-7	So.
22	Dagenais, Sara	F	5-6	So.
25	Williams, Alex	F	5-2	Sr.
27	Harren, Jessica	F	5-7	Fr.
28	Lamoureux, Monique	F	5-6	So.
29	Ney, Stephanie	G	5-9	So.
30	Dagfinrud, Jorid	G	5-6	RFr.
32	Molle, Candace	D	5-5	Fr.
33	Kirkham, Brittany	G	5-4 Sr.	
39	Roy, Stephanie	F	5-4	Jr.
91	Furia, Ashley	F	5-6	Fr.

=== Schedule ===
Date	Opponent	Location	Time	Score	Record
Fri, Oct 02	Wisconsin*	at Madison, Wis.	7:07 p.m.	Win, 2-0	1-0-0
Sat, Oct 03	Wisconsin*	at Madison, Wis.	7:07 p.m.	Loss, 3-0	1-1-0
Sat, Oct 17	Minnesota State*	Grand Forks, N.D.	2:07 p.m.	Loss, 2-4	1-2-0
Sun, Oct 18	Minnesota State*	Grand Forks, N.D.	2:07 p.m.	Tie, 1-1	1-2-1
Fri, Oct 23	Minnesota Duluth*	at Duluth, Minn.	7:07 p.m.	Loss, 1-4	1-3-1
Sat, Oct 24	Minnesota Duluth*	at Duluth, Minn.	7:07 p.m.		
Fri, Oct 30	St. Cloud State*	at St. Cloud, Minn.	7:07 p.m.		
Sat, Oct 31	St. Cloud State*	at St. Cloud, Minn.	2:07 p.m.		
Fri, Nov 06	Ohio State*	Grand Forks, N.D.	7:07 p.m.		
Sat, Nov 07	Ohio State*	Grand Forks, N.D.	4:07 p.m.		
Fri, Nov 27	Maine (Olympic Rink)	Grand Forks, N.D.	2:07 p.m.	5-5	
Sat, Nov 28	Maine (Olympic Rink)	Grand Forks, N.D.	2:07 p.m.	3-3	
Fri, Dec 04	Bemidji State*	at Bemidji, Minn.	7:07 p.m.	0-3	
Sat, Dec 05	Bemidji State*	Grand Forks, N.D.	7:07 p.m.	2-3 (OT)	
Sat, Dec 12	Minnesota*	Grand Forks, N.D.	2:07 p.m.		
Sun, Dec 13	Minnesota*	Grand Forks, N.D.	2:07 p.m.		
Fri, Jan 01	Union	at Schenectady, N.Y.	7:00 p.m.	1-3	
Sat, Jan 02	Union	at Schenectady, N.Y.	7:00 p.m.	5-0	
Fri, Jan 08	Wisconsin*	Fargo, N.D.	7:37 p.m.	3-1	
Sat, Jan 09	Wisconsin*	Fargo, N.D.	7:37 p.m.	0-2	
Fri, Jan 15	St. Cloud State*	Grand Forks, N.D.	7:07 p.m.		
Sat, Jan 16	St. Cloud State*	Grand Forks, N.D.	4:07 p.m.		
Sun, Jan 24	Minnesota*	at Minneapolis, Minn.	7:07 p.m.		
Mon, Jan 25	Minnesota*	at Minneapolis, Minn.	4:07 p.m.		
Sat, Jan 30	Minnesota Duluth*	Grand Forks, N.D.	2:07 p.m.		
Sun, Jan 31	Minnesota Duluth*	Grand Forks, N.D.	2:07 p.m.		
Fri, Feb 05	Ohio State*	at Columbus, Ohio	7:07 p.m.		
Sat, Feb 06	Ohio State*	at Columbus, Ohio	4:07 p.m.		
Fri, Feb 12	Bemidji State *	Grand Forks, N.D.	7:07 p.m.	2-0	
Sat, Feb 13	Bemidji State*	at Bemidji, Minn.	7:07 p.m.	0-1	
Fri, Feb 19	Minnesota State*	at Mankato, Minn.	7:07 p.m.		
Sat, Feb 20	Minnesota State*	at Mankato, Minn.	3:07 p.m.		
Fri, Feb 26 - Sun, Feb 28	WCHA Playoffs -1st Round	at TBA	TBA		

== Player stats ==
= Indicates team leader

=== Skaters ===
Player	Games	Goals	Assists	Points	Points/game	PIM	GWG	PPG	SHG
Alyssa Wiebe	34	9	21	30	0.8824	40	1	0	1
Sara Dagenais	34	10	9	19	0.5588	22	2	1	0
Mary Loken	34	7	9	16	0.4706	22	1	2	0
Ashley Furia	34	6	8	14	0.4118	22	1	1	0
Holly Perkins	20	6	4	10	0.5000	18	1	2	0
Margot Miller	34	4	6	10	0.2941	16	0	2	1
Kelly Lewis	34	1	9	10	0.2941	24	1	1	0
Jordan Slavin	34	3	4	7	0.2059	32	0	0	0
Candace Molle	31	1	6	7	0.2258	43	0	0	0
Stephanie Roy	20	3	3	6	0.3000	10	0	1	0
Megan Gilbert	34	1	5	6	0.1765	6	0	0	0
Susanne Fellner	34	3	2	5	0.1471	14	0	2	0
Ashley Holmes	31	1	4	5	0.1613	12	0	0	0
Alex Williams	29	3	1	4	0.1379	17	0	1	0
Kelsey Ketcher	34	1	2	3	0.0882	16	1	0	0
Allison Parizek	34	1	1	2	0.0588	20	0	0	0
Janet Babchishin	11	1	1	2	0.1818	0	0	0	0
Cassandra Flanagan	34	0	2	2	0.0588	54	0	0	0
Jessica Harren	33	0	1	1	0.0303	0	0	0	0
Stephanie Ney	14	0	0	0	0.0000	0	0	0	0
Jorid Dagfinrud	22	0	0	0	0.0000	0	0	0	0
Brittany Kirkham	5	0	0	0	0.0000	0	0	0	0
Alanna Moir	11	0	0	0	0.0000	2	0	0	0

=== Goaltenders ===
Player	Games Played	Minutes	Goals Against	Wins	Losses	Ties	Shutouts	Save %	Goals Against Average
Ilana Friedman									
Caitlin Whitlock									
Kristen Olychuck									

== Postseason ==
Date	Location	Opponent	Score	Notes
Feb. 26	Heritage Center	Minnesota Duluth	2-6	Emmanuelle Blais scores 4 goals
Feb. 27	Heritage Center	Minnesota Duluth	1-3	Bulldogs sweep series

== International ==
- April 7: Jordan Slavin was named to the 2010 U.S. Women's National Under-18 Team.

== Awards and honors ==
- Sara Dagenais, All-WCHA Academic Team
- Jorid Dagfinrud, WCHA Defensive Player of the Week (Week of October 5)
- Jorid Dagfinrud, All-WCHA Academic Team
- Cassandra Flanagan, All-WCHA Academic Team
- Mary Loken, WCHA Rookie of the Week (Week of January 4)
- Margot Miller, All-WCHA Academic Team
- Stephanie Roy, All-WCHA Academic Team
- Alyssa Wiebe, All-WCHA Academic Team (To qualify for the All-WCHA Academic Team, student-athletes must have one year at the present college and a grade point average of at least 3.0 for the previous two semesters.)
