= 2014–15 University of North Dakota women's ice hockey season =

- Conference: 3rd WCHA
- Home ice: Ralph Engelstad Arena

Rankings
- USA Today/USA Hockey Magazine: 8th
- USCHO.com: 8th

Record
- Overall: 22-12-3
- Home: 13-6-2
- Road: 9-6-1

Coaches and captains
- Head coach: Brian Idalski
- Assistant coaches: Peter Elander; Erik Fabian
- Captain: Andrea Dalen
- Alternate captain(s): Josefine Jakobsen; Tori Williams

The UND Fighting Hawks women's hockey team represented the University of North Dakota in WCHA women's ice hockey during the 2014-15 NCAA Division I women's ice hockey season. Despite elimination in the semifinal round of the WCHA Final Face-Off, The Fighting Hawks finished ten wins over .500, and were ranked 8th nationally by both major polling organizations.

== Offseason ==
- June 5: Goaltender Shelby Amsley-Benzie earned a spot on the 2013-14 Capital One Academic All-America Women's At-Large Third Team.
- August 5: Gracen Hirschy was the only member of the current North Dakota roster that earned an invitation to the USA Hockey's Women's National Festival in Lake Placid, N.Y.

=== Recruiting ===
Player	Position	Nationality	Notes
Annie Chipman	Goaltender	Canada	Attended St. Mary's Academy
Kara Tupa	Forward	United States	Played with Detroit Honeybaked

=== 2014–15 Fighting Hawks ===
No.	Nat.	Player	Class	Pos	Height	DoB	Hometown	Previous team
1		Shelby Amsley-Benzie	Junior	G	5' 7" (1.7 m)		Warroad, Minnesota	Warroad HS
4		Sam LaShomb	Junior	D	5' 9" (1.75 m)		Inver Grove Heights, Minnesota	South St. Paul HS
5		Johanna Fällman	Senior	D	5' 9" (1.75 m)		Luleå, Sweden	Sweden National Team
6		Gracen Hirschy	Sophomore	D	5' 9" (1.75 m)		Fort Wayne, Indiana	Culver Academy
7		Jordan Hampton	Sophomore (RS)	D	5' 7" (1.7 m)		Foxborough, Massachusetts	Northeastern
8		Samantha Hanson	Junior	D	5' 8" (1.73 m)		White Bear Lake, Minnesota	White Bear Lake HS
9		Kara Tupa	Freshman	F	5' 6" (1.68 m)		Fargo, North Dakota	Honeybaked
10		Andrea Dalen (C)	Senior	F	5' 8" (1.73 m)		Honefoss, Norway	Norway National Team
11		Shannon Kaiser	Sophomore	F	5' 8" (1.73 m)		Crookston, Minnesota	Crookston HS
13		Layla Marvin	Junior	F	5' 5" (1.65 m)		Warroad, Minnesota	Warroad HS
14		Marissa Salo	Sophomore	F	5' 9" (1.75 m)		Grand Rapids, Minnesota	North American Hockey Academy
15		Kayla Gardner	Sophomore	F	5' 9" (1.75 m)		Warroad, Minnesota	Warroad HS
16		Tori Williams (A)	Senior	D	5' 3" (1.6 m)		The Pas, Manitoba	Balmoral Hall
18		Halli Krzyzaniak	Sophomore	D	5' 9" (1.75 m)		Neepawa, Manitoba	Pursuit of Excellence
19		Meghan Dufault	Junior	F	5' 4" (1.63 m)		Winnipeg, Manitoba	Balmoral Hall
21		Amy Menke	Sophomore	F	5' 6" (1.68 m)		Shakopee, Minnesota	Shakopee HS
22		Tanja Eisenschmid	Junior	D	5' 8" (1.73 m)		Kaufberen, Germany	German National Team
25		Leah Jensen	Junior	F	5' 6" (1.68 m)		East Grand Forks, Minnesota	East Grand Forks HS
29		Lexie Shaw	Sophomore	G	5' 7" (1.7 m)		Troy, Michigan	Honeybaked
34		Annie Chipman	Freshman (RS)	G	5' 6" (1.68 m)		Winnipeg, Manitoba	St. Mary's Academy
51		Becca Kohler	Junior	F	6' 0" (1.83 m)		St. Thomas, Ontario	Bluewater
55		Lisa Marvin	Sophomore	F	5' 8" (1.73 m)		Warroad, Minnesota	Warroad HS
63		Josefine Jakobsen	Senior	F	5' 7" (1.7 m)		Aalborg, Denmark	Danmark National Team

== Schedule ==
Date	Opponent^{#}	Rank^{#}	Site	Decision	Result	Record
Regular Season
October 3	Rensselaer*	#8	Ralph Engelstad Arena • Grand Forks, ND	Shelby Amsley-Benzie	W 7–1	1–0–0
October 4	Vermont*	#8	Ralph Engelstad Arena • Grand Forks, ND	Lexie Shaw	L 1–3	1–1–0
October 10	at Minnesota State	#10	All Seasons Arena • Mankato, MN	Shelby Amsley-Benzie	W 5–0	2–1–0 (1–0–0)
October 11	at Minnesota State	#10	All Seasons Arena • Mankato, MN	Lexie Shaw	W 2–1	3–1–0 (2–0–0)
October 17	Minnesota Duluth	#10	Ralph Engelstad Arena • Grand Forks, ND	Shelby Amsley-Benzie	W 2–1 ^{OT}	4–1–0 (3–0–0)
October 18	Minnesota Duluth	#10	Ralph Engelstad Arena • Grand Forks, ND	Shelby Amsley-Benzie	L 0–1	4–2–0 (3–1–0)
October 24	at #1 Minnesota	#9	Ridder Arena • Minneapolis, MN	Shelby Amsley-Benzie	L 2–5	4–3–0 (3–2–0)
October 25	at #1 Minnesota	#9	Ridder Arena • Minneapolis, MN	Lexie Shaw	L 0–5	4–4–0 (3–3–0)
October 31	#3 Wisconsin	#10	Ralph Engelstad Arena • Grand Forks, ND	Shelby Amsley-Benzie	T 3–3 ^{OT}	4–4–1 (3–3–1)
November 1	#3 Wisconsin	#10	Ralph Engelstad Arena • Grand Forks, ND	Shelby Amsley-Benzie	L 2–3	4–5–1 (3–4–1)
November 14	at Bemidji State		Sanford Center • Bemidji, MN	Shelby Amsley-Benzie	L 1–4	4–6–1 (3–5–1)
November 15	at Bemidji State		Sanford Center • Bemidji, MN	Lexie Shaw	L 1–2	4–7–1 (3–6–1)
November 21	Ohio State		Ralph Engelstad Arena • Grand Forks, ND	Shelby Amsley-Benzie	T 2–2 ^{OT}	4–7–2 (3–6–2)
November 22	Ohio State		Ralph Engelstad Arena • Grand Forks, ND	Lexie Shaw	W 4–3	5–7–2 (4–6–2)
November 29	St. Cloud State		Ralph Engelstad Arena • Grand Forks, ND	Shelby Amsley-Benzie	W 3–1	6–7–2 (5–6–2)
November 30	St. Cloud State		Ralph Engelstad Arena • Grand Forks, ND	Lexie Shaw	W 6–1	7–7–2 (6–6–2)
December 5	at #3 Wisconsin		LaBahn Arena • Madison, WI	Shelby Amsley-Benzie	L 1–2 ^{OT}	7–8–2 (6–7–2)
December 7	at #3 Wisconsin		LaBahn Arena • Madison, WI	Lexie Shaw	L 0–2	7–9–2 (6–8–2)
December 12	at RIT*		Gene Polisseni Center • Rochester, NY	Shelby Amsley-Benzie	W 3–1	8–9–2
December 13	at RIT*		Gene Polisseni Center • Rochester, NY	Lexie Shaw	W 6–1	9–9–2
January 10, 2015	Syracuse*		Ralph Engelstad Arena • Grand Forks, ND	Shelby Amsley-Benzie	W 4–1	10–9–2
January 11	Syracuse*		Ralph Engelstad Arena • Grand Forks, ND	Lexie Shaw	L 1–2	10–10–2
January 16	at Ohio State		OSU Ice Rink • Columbus, OH	Shelby Amsley-Benzie	W 1–0	11–10–2 (7–8–2)
January 17	at Ohio State		OSU Ice Rink • Columbus, OH	Shelby Amsley-Benzie	W 1–0	12–10–2 (8–8–2)
January 24	Bemidji State		Ralph Engelstad Arena • Grand Forks, ND	Shelby Amsley-Benzie	W 4–1	13–10–2 (9–8–2)
January 25	Bemidji State		Ralph Engelstad Arena • Grand Forks, ND	Shelby Amsley-Benzie	W 5–1	14–10–2 (10–8–2)
January 30	at #6 Minnesota Duluth		AMSOIL Arena • Duluth, MN	Shelby Amsley-Benzie	W 1–0	15–10–2 (11–8–2)
January 31	at #6 Minnesota Duluth		AMSOIL Arena • Duluth, MN	Shelby Amsley-Benzie	T 2–2 ^{OT}	15–10–3 (11–8–3)
February 6	#2 Minnesota		Ralph Engelstad Arena • Grand Forks, ND	Shelby Amsley-Benzie	W 3–0	16–10–3 (12–8–3)
February 7	#2 Minnesota		Ralph Engelstad Arena • Grand Forks, ND	Shelby Amsley-Benzie	W 1–3	16–11–3 (12–9–3)
February 13	at St. Cloud State	#9	Herb Brooks National Hockey Center • St. Cloud, MN	Shelby Amsley-Benzie	W 4–0	17–11–3 (13–9–3)
February 14	at St. Cloud State	#9	Herb Brooks National Hockey Center • St. Cloud, MN	Shelby Amsley-Benzie	W 2–0	18–11–3 (14–9–3)
February 20	Minnesota State	#7	Ralph Engelstad Arena • Grand Forks, ND	Shelby Amsley-Benzie	W 7–0	19–11–3 (15–9–3)
February 21	Minnesota State	#7	Ralph Engelstad Arena • Grand Forks, ND	Shelby Amsley-Benzie	W 2–0	20–11–3 (16–9–3)
WCHA Tournament
February 27	Ohio State*	#8	Ralph Engelstad Arena • Grand Forks, ND (Quarterfinal, Game 1)	Shelby Amsley-Benzie	W 5–2	21–11–3
February 28	Ohio State*	#8	Ralph Engelstad Arena • Grand Forks, ND (Quarterfinal, Game 2)	Shelby Amsley-Benzie	W 2–1	22–11–3
March 7	#3 Wisconsin*	#8	Ralph Engelstad Arena • Grand Forks, ND (Semifinal Game)	Shelby Amsley-Benzie	L 1–4	22–12–3
*Non-conference game. ^{#}Rankings from USCHO.com Poll.

== Awards and honors ==
- Shelby Amsley-Benzie, WCHA Outstanding Student-Athlete of the Year
- Shelby Amsley-Benzie, Goaltender, All-WCHA First Team
- Halli Krzyzaniak, Defense, All-WCHA Third Team
- Becca Kohler, Forward, All-WCHA Third Team
- Shelby Amsley-Benzie was the fifth leading goaltender in Goals Against Average in the nation, and the only Goaltender among Patty Kazmaier Award winners.
