= 2012–13 Ohio State Buckeyes women's ice hockey season =

- Conference: WCHA

Rankings
- USA Today/USA Hockey Magazine: Not ranked
- USCHO.com/CBS College Sports: Not ranked

Record

Coaches and captains
- Head coach: Nate Hanrahan

The Ohio State Buckeyes represented Ohio State University in WCHA women's ice hockey. The Buckeyes will attempt to qualify for the NCAA tournament for the first time in school history.

== Offseason ==
=== Recruiting ===
Player	Nationality	Position	Notes
Cara Zubko	Canada	Defense	Attended Pursuit of Excellence Academy
Bryanna Neuwald	Canada	Forward	Played for the Aurora Jr. Panthers
Melani Moylan	Canada	Forward	Member of Oakville Jr. Hornets
Julia McKinnon	Canada	Forward	Played at Ontario Hockey Academy
Kendall Curtis	United States	Forward	Competed for the Colorado Selects

== Regular season ==
=== Standings ===
2012–13 Western Collegiate Hockey Association standings
	Conference								Overall				
	GP	W	L	T	SW	PTS	GF	GA	W	L	T	GF	GA
Minnesota†*	28	28	0	0	0	84	141	27	41	0	0	216	36
Wisconsin	28	17	9	2	2	55	70	46	23	10	2	103	53
North Dakota	28	18	9	1	0	55	96	64	26	12	1	144	88
Minnesota Duluth	28	13	13	2	1	42	72	71	14	16	4	81	85
Ohio State	28	12	13	3	3	42	75	80	19	15	3	107	96
Minnesota State	28	6	17	5	1	24	46	95	10	21	5	69	122
St. Cloud State	28	5	21	2	1	18	37	93	9	24	3	57	113
Bemidji State	28	5	22	1	0	16	40	101	6	26	2	49	127

Source: wcha.com

=== Schedule ===
Date	Opponent	Result	Record	Conference Record

== Roster ==
Number	Player	Position	Height	Shoots

== Awards and honors ==
- Chelsea Knapp, WCHA Defensive Player of the Week (Week of October 10, 2012)
- Paige Semenza, WCHA Player of the Week (Week of October 25, 2012)
