= 2012–13 Minnesota Duluth Bulldogs women's ice hockey season =

- Conference: WCHA
- Home ice: Amsoil Arena

Rankings
- USA Today/USA Hockey Magazine: Not ranked
- USCHO.com/CBS College Sports: Not ranked

Record

Coaches and captains
- Head coach: Shannon Miller

The Minnesota Duluth Bulldogs represented the University of Minnesota Duluth in WCHA women's ice hockey.

== Offseason ==
=== Recruiting ===
Player	Nationality	Position	Notes
Alivia Del Basso	Australia		First player from Australia to play NCAA women’s ice hockey
Kayla Black	Canada	Goaltender	Played with Canadian National Under-18 team
Jordan Krause	Canada	Defense	Played with Canadian National Under-18 team
Hannah Bramm	United States	Forward	Attended North American Hockey Academy
Maria Delarbre	Germany		Competed with the German Under-18 team
Aleksandra Vafina	Russia		Member of Russian national women’s team
Sofia Carlstrom	Sweden	Goaltender	Participated with the Swedish Under-18 Team
Karissa Grapp	United States	Goaltender	Played for the Ohio Flames

== Regular season ==
=== Standings ===
2012–13 Western Collegiate Hockey Association standings
	Conference								Overall				
	GP	W	L	T	SW	PTS	GF	GA	W	L	T	GF	GA
Minnesota†*	28	28	0	0	0	84	141	27	41	0	0	216	36
Wisconsin	28	17	9	2	2	55	70	46	23	10	2	103	53
North Dakota	28	18	9	1	0	55	96	64	26	12	1	144	88
Minnesota Duluth	28	13	13	2	1	42	72	71	14	16	4	81	85
Ohio State	28	12	13	3	3	42	75	80	19	15	3	107	96
Minnesota State	28	6	17	5	1	24	46	95	10	21	5	69	122
St. Cloud State	28	5	21	2	1	18	37	93	9	24	3	57	113
Bemidji State	28	5	22	1	0	16	40	101	6	26	2	49	127

Source: wcha.com

=== Schedule ===
Date	Opponent	Result	Record	Conference Record

== Roster ==
Number	Player	Position	Height	Former team
	Alivia Del Basso			Australian National Women’s Team
1	Kayla Black	Goaltender		Canadian National Under-18 Team
7	Emma Stauber	Defense	5-7	PHM Mirage
9	Katie Wilson	Forward	5-8	Balmoral Hall Blazers
10	Audrey Cournoyer	Forward	5-3	Dawson College
14	Jordan Krause	Defense	5-9	Canadian National Under-18 Team
16	Jamie Kenyon	Forward	5-5	Madison Capitals
18	Hannah Bramm	Forward	5-7	North American Hockey Academy
19	Jenna McParland	Forward	5-9	Toronto Jr. Aeros
21	Vanessa Thibault	Forward	5-3	John Abbott College
22	Maria Delarbre			German Under-18 National Team
29	Aleksandra Vafina	Forward		Russian National Team
30	Sofia Carlstrom	Goaltender		Sweden Under-18 National Team
34	Karissa Grapp	Goaltender		Ohio Flames
44	Zoe Hickel	Forward	5-6	North American Hockey Academy
49	Jessica Wong	Defense	5-7	Canadian Under-18 National Team
51	Pernilla Winberg	Forward	5-5	Swedish National Team
71	Shara Jasper	Forward	5-4	Colorado Select
79	Dana Gallop	Forward	5-7	Left
80	Tea Villia	Defense	5-5	
88	Brigette Lacquette	Defense	5-6	Manitoba Bisons (CIS)
92	Brienna Gillanders	Forward	5-9	Notre Dame Hounds

== Awards and honors ==
- Kayla Black, WCHA Defensive Player of the Week (Week of October 18, 2012)
