= 2012–13 Wisconsin Badgers women's ice hockey season =

- Conference: WCHA
- Home ice: Kohl Center

Rankings
- USA Today/USA Hockey Magazine: Not ranked
- USCHO.com/CBS College Sports: Not ranked

Record

Coaches and captains
- Head coach: Mark Johnson

The Wisconsin Badgers represented the University of Wisconsin in WCHA women's ice hockey.

== Offseason ==
=== Recruiting ===
Player	Nationality	Position	Notes
Courtney Burke	United States	Defense	
Kaitlyn Harding	United States	Forward	
Molly Doner	United States	Forward	
Kim Drake	United States	Forward	
Erika Sowchuk	Canada	Forward	
Rachel Jones	United States	Forward	
Jorie Walters	United States	Goaltender	

== Regular season ==
=== Standings ===
2012–13 Western Collegiate Hockey Association standings
	Conference								Overall				
	GP	W	L	T	SW	PTS	GF	GA	W	L	T	GF	GA
Minnesota†*	28	28	0	0	0	84	141	27	41	0	0	216	36
Wisconsin	28	17	9	2	2	55	70	46	23	10	2	103	53
North Dakota	28	18	9	1	0	55	96	64	26	12	1	144	88
Minnesota Duluth	28	13	13	2	1	42	72	71	14	16	4	81	85
Ohio State	28	12	13	3	3	42	75	80	19	15	3	107	96
Minnesota State	28	6	17	5	1	24	46	95	10	21	5	69	122
St. Cloud State	28	5	21	2	1	18	37	93	9	24	3	57	113
Bemidji State	28	5	22	1	0	16	40	101	6	26	2	49	127

Source: wcha.com

=== Schedule ===
Date	Opponent	Result	Record	Conference Record

== Roster ==
Number	Player	Position	Height	Shoots
5	Stefanie McKeough	Forward	5-7	Right
7	Kelly Jaminski	Defense	6-0	Left
10	Brittany Ammerman	Forward	5-6	Left
12	Katy Josephs	Forward	5-4	Right
14	Madison Packer	Forward	5-9	Right
15	Alev Kelter	Defense	5-8	Right
16	Saige Pacholok	Defense	5-5	Right
17	Blayre Turnbull	Forward	5-7	Right
18	Brianna Decker	Forward	5-4	Right
21	Lauren Unser	Forward	5-4	Right
24	Karley Sylvester	Forward	5-9	Left
25	Erika Sowchuk	Forward	5-7	Left
27	Rachel Jones	Defense	5-8	Left
28	Natalie Berg	Defense	5-6	Right
30	Jorie Walters	Goaltender	5-4	Left
31	Alex Rigsby	Goaltender	5-7	Left
