= 2012–13 University of North Dakota women's ice hockey season =

- Conference: WCHA
- Home ice: Ralph Engelstad Arena

Record
- Overall: 26–12–1

Coaches and captains
- Head coach: Brian Idalski
- Assistant coaches: Peter Elander; Erik Fabian; Eli Rosendahl
- Captain: Jocelyne Lamoureux

The University of North Dakota women's ice hockey team represented the University of North Dakota in the WCHA women's ice hockey conference.

== Offseason ==
=== Recruiting ===
| Player | Position | Nationality | Notes |
| Sam LaShomb | Defense | United States | Attended South St. Paul High School |
| Johanna Fallman | Defense | Sweden | Member of Swedish National Team |
| Samantha Hanson | Defense | United States | |
| Marissa Salo | Forward | United States | Attended North American Hockey Academy |
| Meghan Dufault | Defense | Canada | Competed with Canadian Under-18 National Team |
| Tanja Eisenschmid | Defense | Germany | Competed with ESV Kaufbeuren in Germany |
| Amanda Koep | Goaltender | United States | Attended North Wright County High School |
| Rebecca Kohler | Forward | Canada | Competed in Provincial Women's Hockey League |

== Regular season ==
=== Current record ===
| Overall record | WCHA record | Home, away, neutral, exhibition |
|---|---|---|
| 26–12–1 | 18–9–1–0 (55 pts.) | 15–5–0, 10–5–1, 1–2–0, 0–0–0 |

=== Current rankings ===
| Poll | Affiliation | Rank |
|---|---|---|
| WCHA Rank | Conference | #NA |
| USCHO.com Coaches Poll | National | #NA |
| USA Today Poll | National | #NA |
| NCAA Pairwise Rank | Post-Season | #NA |
| USCHO KRACH Rank | Post-Season | #NA |
| NCAA Ratings Percentage Index | Post-Season | #NA |

=== North Dakota statistics ===
| Name | Stat | National rank |
|---|---|---|
| Scoring Offense | 0.00 G/GM (0GF) | #NA |
| Scoring Defense | 0.00 G/GM (0GA) | #NA |
| Scoring Margin | 0.00 | #NA |
| Penalty Minutes | 00.0 PIM/GM (0 PM) | #NA |
| Power Play | 00.0% (00/00, 0SHA) | #NA |
| Penalty Kill | 00.0% (00/00, 0SHF) | #NA |
| Winning Percentage | 0–0–0 00.0% | #NA |
| Unbeaten Streak | 0g 0–0–0 | #NA |

=== 2012–13 schedule and results ===
- Green background indicates regulation or overtime win.
- Red background indicates regulation or overtime loss.
- White background indicates tie or overtime tie.

| # | Date | Visitor | Score | Home | OT | Decision | Attendance | WCHA | Overall | Notes |
|---|---|---|---|---|---|---|---|---|---|---|
| 1 | October 5 | Minnesota State | 3–2 | #5 North Dakota | | Butters | 1,593 | 0–1–0–0 | 0–1–0 |
| 2 | October 6 | Minnesota State | 1–4 | #5 North Dakota | | Amsley-Benzie | 1,079 | 1–1–0–0 | 1–1–0 |
| 3 | October 12 | #6 North Dakota | 3–5 | #10 Ohio State | | Knapp | 343 | 1–2–0–0 | 1–2–0 |
| 4 | October 13 | #6 North Dakota | 2–0 | #10 Ohio State | | Dagfinrud | 295 | 2–2–0–0 | 2–2–0 |
| 5 | October 19 | St. Cloud State | 1–3 | #10 North Dakota | | Daginfurd | 1,355 | 3–2–0–0 | 3–2–0 |
| 6 | October 20 | St. Cloud State | 0–1 | #10 North Dakota | | Daginfurd | 1,404 | 4–2–0–0 | 4–2–0 |
| 7 | October 27 | #1 Minnesota | 5–1 | #8 North Dakota | | Räty | 3,591 | 4–3–0–0 | 4–3–0 |
| 8 | October 28 | #1 Minnesota | 4–2 | #8 North Dakota | | Räty | 1,289 | 4–4–0–0 | 4–4–0 |
| 9† | November 2 | #4 Clarkson | 3–1 | #9 North Dakota | | Howe | 765 | 4–4–0–0 | 4–5–0 |
| 10† | November 3 | #4 Clarkson | 2–3 | #9 North Dakota | | Amsley-Benzie | 833 | 4–4–0–0 | 5–5–0 |
| 11 | November 17 | #10 North Dakota | 3–1 | Bemidji State | | Dagfinrud | 450 | 5–4–0–0 | 6–5–0 |
| 12 | November 18 | #10 North Dakota | 7–3 | Bemidji State | | Amsley-Benzie | 321 | 6–4–0–0 | 7–5–0 |
| 13 | November 23 | Minnesota-Duluth | 3–4 | North Dakota | OT | Dagfinrud | 1,171 | 7–4–0–0 | 8–5–0 |
| 14 | November 24 | Minnesota-Duluth | 2–5 | North Dakota | | Amsley-Benzie | 1,354 | 8–4–0–0 | 9–5–0 |
| 15† | November 30 | RIT | 2–3 | #8 North Dakota | | Dagfinrud | 941 | 8–4–0–0 | 10–5–0 |
| 16† | December 1 | RIT | 2–8 | #8 North Dakota | | Amsley-Benzie | 1,073 | 8–4–0–0 | 11–5–0 |
| 17 | December 8 | #8 North Dakota | 2–3 | #9 Wisconsin | | Rigsby | 1,771 | 8–5–0–0 | 11–6–0 |
| 18 | December 9 | #8 North Dakota | 1–3 | #9 Wisconsin | | Rigsby | 1,539 | 8–6–0–0 | 11–7–0 |
| 19† | January 4 | #10 North Dakota | 7–3 | Lindenwood | | Dagfinrud | 103 | 8–6–0–0 | 12–7–0 |
| 20† | January 5 | #10 North Dakota | 8–4 | Lindenwood | | Amsley-Benzie | 103 | 8–6–0–0 | 13–7–0 |
| 21 | January 11 | North Dakota | 3–6 | #1 Minnesota | | Räty | 2,014 | 8–7–0–0 | 13–8–0 |
| 22 | January 12 | North Dakota | 3–6 | #1 Minnesota | | Räty | 2,703 | 8–8–0–0 | 13–9–0 |
| 23 | January 18 | #7 Wisconsin | 0–3 | North Dakota | | Amsley-Benzie | 920 | 9–8–0–0 | 14–9–0 |
| 24 | January 19 | #7 Wisconsin | 2–1 | North Dakota | | Rigsby | 1,051 | 9–9–0–0 | 14–10–0 |
| 25 | January 25 | #9/10 North Dakota | 6–2 | St. Cloud State | | Amsley-Benzie | 218 | 10–9–0–0 | 15–10–0 |
| 26 | January 26 | #9/10 North Dakota | 3–0 | St. Cloud State | | Amsley-Benzie | 230 | 11–9–0–0 | 16–10–0 |
| 27 | February 1 | #9 North Dakota | 4–2 | Minnesota State | | Amsley-Benzie | 353 | 12–9–0–0 | 17–10–0 |
| 28 | February 2 | #9 North Dakota | 8–2 | Minnesota State | | Amsley-Benzie | 273 | 13–9–0–0 | 18–10–0 |
| 29 | February 8 | Bemidji State | 3–4 | #8/9 North Dakota | OT | Amsley-Benzie | 1,038 | 14–9–0–0 | 19–10–0 |
| 30 | February 9 | Bemidji State | 0–7 | #8/9 North Dakota | | Amsley-Benzie | 1,160 | 15–9–0–0 | 20–10–0 |
| 31 | February 15 | Ohio State | 2–5 | #7/8 North Dakota | | Amsley-Benzie | 1,156 | 16–9–0–0 | 21–10–0 |
| 32 | February 16 | Ohio State | 2–3 | #7/8 North Dakota | | Amsley-Benzie | 1,264 | 17–9–0–0 | 22–10–0 |
| 33 | February 22 | #7/8 North Dakota | 4–1 | Minnesota-Duluth | | Amsley-Benzie | 1,196 | 18–9–0–0 | 23–10–0 |
| 34 | February 23 | #7/8 North Dakota | 2–2 | Minnesota-Duluth | SO | | 2,098 | 18–9–1–0 | 23–10–1 |
| 35 | March 1 | Minnesota State | 6–1 | #7/8 North Dakota | | Amsley-Benzie | 569 | 18–9–1–0 | 24–10–1 | WCHA First Round |
| 36 | March 2 | Minnesota State | 8–1 | #7/8 North Dakota | | Amsley-Benzie | 1,259 | 18–9–1–0 | 25–10–1 | WCHA First Round |
| 37 | March 8 | North Dakota | 2–1 | Wisconsin | | Amsley-Benzie | 688 | 18–9–1–0 | 26–10–1 | WCHA Final Face-off (Ridder Arena, Minneapolis, MN) |
| 37 | March 8 | North Dakota | 0–2 | Minnesota | | Räty | 2,286 | 18–9–1–0 | 26–11–1 | WCHA Final Face-off (Ridder Arena, Minneapolis, MN) |
| 38 | March 16 | North Dakota | 2–3 | Minnesota | 3OT | Räty | 2,750 | 18–9–1–0 | 26–12–1 | NCAA Regionals (Ridder Arena, Minneapolis, MN) |

Notes:

(EX) Denotes an exhibition game

† Denotes a non-conference game

== Awards and honors ==
Meghan Dufault, WCHA Rookie of the Week (Week of January 9, 2013)
