= North Dakota Fighting Hawks women's ice hockey =

- University: University of North Dakota
- Conference: WCHA
- Head coach: Brian Idalski; 10th season, 169–156–39
- Arena: Ralph Engelstad Arena; Grand Forks, North Dakota
- Colors: Kelly green and white
- Fight song: It's For You, North Dakota U Stand Up and Cheer

NCAA tournament appearances
- 2012, 2013

The North Dakota Fighting Sioux women's ice hockey team was the women's college ice hockey team at the University of North Dakota. They were members of the Western Collegiate Hockey Association (WCHA) and competed in National Collegiate Athletic Association (NCAA) Division I women ice hockey.

The program was cut by the University of North Dakota on March 29, 2017.

== History ==
On October 5, 2010, North Dakota was ranked 10th in the Uscho.com poll. It was only the second time in program history that the club was in the top 10 in either the USA Today or Uscho.com poll. The last time came during the 2008–09 season after a 7–2–1 start. On October 23, 2010, Jocelyne Lamoureux had a hat trick and one assist. In addition, one of her goals was the game-winning goal. The hat trick was the first by a North Dakota player since Cami Wooster in 2005. On February 25–27, North Dakota participated in its first WCHA First Round Home Playoff Series, vs. Bemidji State at Fido Purpur Arena. On February 27, the Sioux advanced to their first WCHA Final Face-off berth winning an overtime thriller 3–2 in OT with a goal by Monique Lamoureux.

In its WCHA home opener on October 21, 2011, the top line of the Fighting Sioux combined for thirteen points as they bested the Ohio State Buckeyes by an 11–1 margin. Monique Lamoureux-Kolls tied a North Dakota record with a 5-point game. In the contest, 13 different Sioux skaters registered at least one point. Michelle Karvinen scored a hat trick and logged one assist for four points. In addition, Josefine Jakobsen and Jocelyne Lamoureux each had 4-point games. Several program records were broken in the game including: most goals scored in a game (11), largest margin of victory (10), and largest margin of victory over a conference opponent (10).

On March 29, 2017, the University of North Dakota announced it was cutting women's hockey – along with men's and women's swimming and diving – to meet a mandated $1.3M reduction in the athletics department budget that was part of a university-wide budget cut. Following the decision to drop the program, 11 ex-UND players filed a complaint claiming that dropping the program violated Title IX guidelines. The U.S. Department of Education's Office for Civil Rights dismissed two discrimination complaints related to the decision and on June 20, 2019, a U.S. District Court judge dismissed a lawsuit against the school brought on similar grounds.

=== Year by Year ===
Won championship	Lost championship	Conference champions	League leader

Season	Coach	W	L	T	Conference	Conf. W	Conf. L	Conf. T	Finish	Conference Tournament	NCAA Tournament
2002–03	Shantel Rivard	10	14	2	Independent						Did not qualify
2003–04	Shantel Rivard	16	14	2	Independent						Did not qualify
2004–05	Shantel Rivard	9	23	3	WCHA	6	21	1	7th WCHA	Lost Quarterfinals vs. Minnesota Duluth (3-2 OT)	Did not qualify
2005–06	Shantel Rivard	7	27	2	WCHA	3	23	2	8th WCHA	Lost Quarterfinals vs. Wisconsin (4-1, 6-0)	Did not qualify
2006–07	Shantel Rivard (18 games); Dennis Miller (18 games)	3	31	2	WCHA	0	27	1	8th WCHA	Lost Quarterfinals vs. Wisconsin (4-0, 3-0)	Did not qualify
2007–08	Brian Idalski	4	26	6	WCHA	4	20	4	7th WCHA	Lost Quarterfinals vs. Minnesota (3-1, 9-0)	Did not qualify
2008–09	Brian Idalski	13	19	4	WCHA	9	16	3	6th WCHA	Lost Quarterfinals vs. Minnesota Duluth (7-0, 4-0)	Did not qualify
2009–10	Brian Idalski	8	22	4	WCHA	7	19	2	8th WCHA	Lost Quarterfinals vs. Minnesota Duluth (6-1, 4-1)	Did not qualify
2010–11	Brian Idalski	20	13	3	WCHA	16	10	2	4th WCHA	Won Quarterfinals vs. Bemidji State (3–2, 0–3, 3–2 OT); Lost Semifinals vs. Wisconsin (3-0)	Did not qualify
2011–12	Brian Idalski	22	12	3	WCHA	16	9	3	3rd WCHA	Won Quarterfinals vs. Bemidji State (3–1, 2–0); Lost Semifinals vs. Minnesota (6-0)	Lost First Round vs. Minnesota (5-1)
2012–13	Brian Idalski	26	12	1	WCHA	18	9	1	2nd WCHA	Won Quarterfinals vs. Minnesota State (6–1, 8–1); Won Semifinals vs. Wisconsin (2–1); Lost Championship vs. Minnesota (2-0)	Lost First Round vs. Minnesota (3-2 3OT)
2013–14	Brian Idalski	20	12	4	WCHA	14	10	4	3rd WCHA	Won Quarterfinals vs. Bemidji State (4–2, 3–2 OT); Won Semifinals vs. Wisconsin (1–0); Lost Championship vs. Minnesota (3-1)	Did not qualify
2014–15	Brian Idalski	22	12	3	WCHA	16	9	3	3rd WCHA	Won Quarterfinals vs. Ohio State (5–2, 2–1 3OT); Lost Semifinals vs. Wisconsin (4-1)	Did not qualify
2015–16	Brian Idalski	18	12	5	WCHA	13	10	5	4th WCHA	Won Quarterfinals vs. St. Cloud State (6–1, 6–1); Lost Semifinals vs. Minnesota (2-0)	Did not qualify
2016–17	Brian Idalski	16	16	6	WCHA	11	12	5	4th WCHA	Won Quarterfinals vs. Ohio State (3-2 OT, 4–1, 2–1 OT); Lost Semifinals vs. Wisconsin (2-1)	Did not qualify

== Head coaches ==
Tenure	Coach	Years	Record	Pct.	Championships
2002–2006	Shantel Rivard	5	45–91–11	.344	None
2006–2007	Dennis Miller	1	0–18–0	.000	None
2007–2017	Brian Idalski	10	169–156–39	.518	None

=== Records vs. WCHA opponents ===
Team	City, State	Arena	Record	First Meeting	Recent Meeting
Minnesota	Minneapolis, Minnesota	Ridder Arena	4–32–0	6-2 L	5–1 L
St. Cloud State	St. Cloud, Minnesota	National Hockey Center	15–18–4	4-2 L	10–0 W
Minnesota Duluth	Duluth, Minnesota	AMSOIL Arena	5–35–1	13-0 L	5–1 L
Minnesota State	Mankato, Minnesota	All Seasons Arena	11–21–6	3–2 W	3–3 T
Wisconsin	Madison, Wisconsin	Kohl Center	2–34–1	5-1 L	4–4 T
Bemidji State	Bemidji, Minnesota	Sanford Center	24–18–3	2–2 T	2–0 W
Ohio State	Columbus, Ohio	OSU Ice Arena	11–18–3	5–4 W	5–2 W

== Olympians ==
- (Canada) Kristen Campbell
- (Finland) Michelle Karvinen
- (Finland) Anna Kilponen
- (Finland) Emma Nuutinen
- (Finland) Vilma Tanskanen
- (Finland) Susanna Tapani
- (Germany) Tanja Eisenschmid
- (Germany) Susanne Fellner
- (United States) Jocelyne Lamoureux
- (United States) Monique Lamoureux
- (Sweden) Johanna Fällman

== Fighting Hawks in professional hockey ==
= CWHL All-Star	= NWHL All-Star	= Clarkson Cup Champion	= Isobel Cup Champion

Player	Position	Team(s)	League(s)	Years	Championships
Kayla Gardner	Forward	Calgary Inferno; Brynäs IF Dam	CWHL; SDHL	2	
Halli Krzyzaniak	Defense	Calgary Inferno	CWHL		2018 Clarkson Cup
Jocelyne Lamoureux	Forward	Dream Gap Tour	PWHPA		2015 Clarkson Cup
Monique Lamoureux	Defense	Boston Blades; Dream Gap Tour	CWHL; PWHPA		2015 Clarkson Cup

== Awards and honors ==
- Shelby Amsley-Benzie, 2014–15 and 2015–16 WCHA Outstanding Student-Athlete of the Year, 2014–15 WCHA Goaltending Champion, 2014–15 All-WCHA First Team
- Casie Hanson, 2007–08 WCHA Outstanding Student-Athlete of the Year
- Michelle Karvinen, 2011–12 WCHA Rookie of the Year
- Jocelyne Lamoureux, 2011–12 and 2012–13 WCHA Outstanding Student-Athlete of the Year, 2011–12 WCHA Scoring Champion
