= Western Collegiate Hockey Association women's champions =

College athletic conference

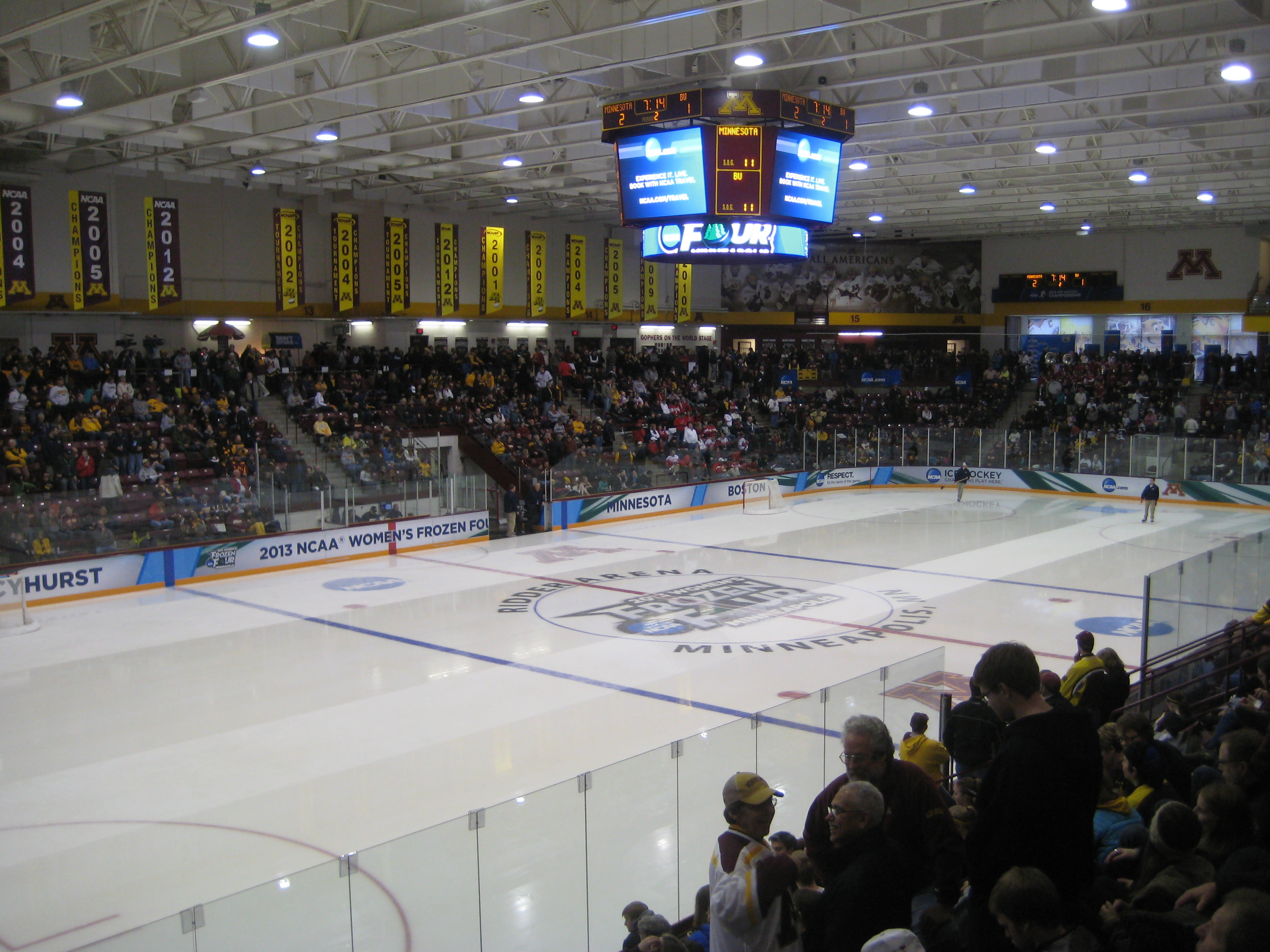
Ridder Arena in Minneapolis has hosted the WCHA Tournament 18 times

The Western Collegiate Hockey Association is a college athletic conference which operates in the Midwestern United States. It participates as a women's ice hockey conference in the NCAA's National Collegiate division, the de facto equivalent of Division I in that sport. (Note: The NCAA officially uses the "National Collegiate" term to describe championship events that are open to members of more than one NCAA division. All such NCAA championship events use the term except men's ice hockey, in which the top-level championship is styled as a Division I championship because of the previous existence of a Division II championship in that sport.) Founded in 1951 as a men's ice hockey conference, it added a women's division in 1999, and continued to operate men's and women's divisions through the 2020–21 hockey season. After that season, the WCHA disbanded its men's division after seven of its 10 men's members left the conference to reestablish the Central Collegiate Hockey Association; the WCHA remained in operation as a women-only league. Each team plays 28 league games, each team playing four games against every other, two home games and two road games.

The women's WCHA tournament seeds all 8 teams, and conducts a standard 8-team tournament at a single site over 4 days. The winner receives the league's automatic bid to the NCAA Tournament. WCHA teams won the first 13 NCAA Tournament championships from its inception in 2001.

== Championships ==
=== By season ===
Season	Regular season champion	Tournament champion	NCAA national champion	Notes
1999–2000	Minnesota–Duluth	Minnesota–Duluth	— (Note: Prior to the NCAA establishing a women's ice hockey championship in the 2000–01 season, the American Women's College Hockey Alliance held a national championship from the 1997–98 season to the 1999–2000 season. Minnesota won the AWCHA championship in 2000.)	Bemidji State, Minnesota, Minnesota–Duluth, Minnesota State, Ohio State, St. Cloud State and Wisconsin begin conference play
2000–01	Minnesota	Minnesota–Duluth	Minnesota–Duluth	NCAA begins awarding a national championship for women's ice hockey
2001–02	Minnesota	Minnesota	Minnesota–Duluth	
2002–03	Minnesota–Duluth	Minnesota–Duluth	Minnesota–Duluth	
2003–04	Minnesota	Minnesota	Minnesota	
2004–05	Minnesota	Minnesota	Minnesota	North Dakota begins conference play
2005–06	Wisconsin	Wisconsin	Wisconsin	
2006–07	Wisconsin	Wisconsin	Wisconsin	
2007–08	Minnesota–Duluth	Minnesota–Duluth	Minnesota–Duluth	WCHA championships later vacated due to ineligible player
2008–09	Minnesota	Wisconsin	Wisconsin	
2009–10	Minnesota & Minnesota–Duluth (Note: Minnesota and Minnesota–Duluth were named regular season co-champions in 2010)	Minnesota–Duluth	Minnesota–Duluth	Minnesota and Minnesota–Duluth were named regular season conference co-champions after finishing tied for first. Minnesota–Duluth got the top seed for the conference tournament.
2010–11	Wisconsin	Wisconsin	Wisconsin	
2011–12	Wisconsin	Minnesota	Minnesota	
2012–13	Minnesota	Minnesota	Minnesota	Undefeated season for Minnesota
2013–14	Minnesota	Minnesota	—	
2014–15	Minnesota	Wisconsin	Minnesota	
2015–16	Wisconsin	Wisconsin	Minnesota	
2016–17	Wisconsin	Wisconsin	—	Last season for North Dakota
2017–18	Wisconsin	Minnesota	—	
2018–19	Minnesota	Wisconsin	Wisconsin	
2019–20	Wisconsin	Ohio State	—	NCAA championship tournament canceled due to COVID-19 pandemic
2020–21	Wisconsin	Wisconsin	Wisconsin	
2021–22	Minnesota	Ohio State	Ohio State	St. Thomas began conference play
2022–23	Ohio State	Minnesota	Wisconsin	
2023–24	Ohio State	Wisconsin	Ohio State	
2024–25	Wisconsin	Wisconsin	Wisconsin	
2025–26	Wisconsin	Ohio State	Wisconsin	

=== By school ===
School	Regular season championships	Tournament championships	NCAA national championships	Last regular season championship	Last tournament championship	Last NCAA national championship
Bemidji State	0	0	0	—	—	—
Minnesota	11	8	6	2022	2023	2016
Minnesota Duluth	4	5	5	2010	2010	2010
Minnesota State	0	0	0	—	—	—
North Dakota	0	0	0	—	—	—
Ohio State	2	3	2	2024	2026	2024
St. Cloud State	0	0	0	—	—	—
St. Thomas	0	0	0	—	—	—
Wisconsin	11	11	9	2026	2025	2026

== Location of women's WCHA tournaments ==
- 2000: Bloomington Ice Garden; Bloomington, Minnesota
- 2001: Rochester Recreation Center; Rochester, Minnesota
- 2002: Fogerty Arena; Blaine, Minnesota
- 2003: Ralph Engelstad Arena; Grand Forks, North Dakota
- 2004–2007: Ridder Arena; Minneapolis, Minnesota
- 2008: Duluth Entertainment Convention Center; Duluth, Minnesota
- 2009–2013: Ridder Arena; Minneapolis, Minnesota
- 2014: Sanford Center; Bemidji, Minnesota
- 2015: Ralph Engelstad Arena; Grand Forks, North Dakota
- 2016–2024: Ridder Arena; Minneapolis, Minnesota
- 2025: AMSOIL Arena, Duluth, Minnesota
- 2026: Lee & Penny Anderson Arena, Saint Paul, Minnesota
