= 2010–11 WCHA women's ice hockey season =

2010–11 Western Collegiate Hockey Association women's ice hockey season
- League: NCAA Division I
- Sport: Ice hockey
- Duration: September 2010 - March, 2011
- Teams: 8

Tournament
- Champion: Wisconsin Badgers
- Runners-up: Minnesota Golden Gophers
- Top scorer: Meghan Duggan

Ice hockey seasons
- 08–09 11–12

The 2010–11 WCHA women's ice hockey season marked the continuation of the annual tradition of competitive ice hockey among Western Collegiate Hockey Association members.

== Offseason ==
- June 18: Seven University of Minnesota players have been named to the United States Under-22 Team. Megan Bozek, Sarah Erickson, Amanda Kessel, Anne Schleper, Jen Schoullis and Emily West have all been named to the team. The Minnesota contingent is the largest group from one school.
- June 29: In March 2012, Minnesota Duluth will be the host school for the 2012 NCAA Division l Frozen Four women's tournament. The tournament will be held at the new Amsoil Arena, next to the current Duluth Entertainment Convention Center. The Bulldogs hosted the Frozen Four in both 2008 and 2003.
- September 22: Hilary Knight from Wisconsin was selected as the WCHA Pre-Season Player of the Year while Amanda Kessel from Minnesota was the WCHA Pre-Season Rookie of the Year.
- September 28: In the USA Today/USA Hockey Magazine Women's College Hockey Poll, the Minnesota Duluth Bulldogs have been voted as the pre-season Number 1.

== Exhibition ==
Date	NCAA school	Opponent	Score	NCAA goal scorers
Sept. 25	North Dakota	Toronto Aeros	9-0	Sara Dagenais, Mary Loken (2), Jocelyne Lamoureux (3), Monique Lamoureux (2)
Sept. 26	Minnesota	Manitoba	8-0	Amanda Kessel (3), Emily West (2), Jen Schoullis, Becky Kortum, Nikki Ludwigson
Oct. 2	Ohio State	Wilfird Laurier	Ohio State, 2-0	Hokey Langan, Tina Hollowell

== Season standings ==
2010–11 Western Collegiate Hockey Association standings
	Conference								Overall					
	GP	W	L	T	SW	PTS	GF	GA	GP	W	L	T	GF	GA
#1 Wisconsin†*	28	24	2	2	2	76	140	50	38	34	2	2	203	66
#3 Minnesota	28	18	8	2	1	57	100	52	37	26	9	2	131	65
#6 Minnesota Duluth	28	18	7	3	0	57	109	49	33	22	8	3	131	53
#8 North Dakota	28	16	10	2	0	50	96	79	36	20	13	3	116	103
Bemidji State	28	11	13	4	2	39	53	71	35	14	17	4	70	88
Ohio State	28	8	17	3	3	30	69	100	36	14	19	3	99	116
Minnesota State	28	7	20	1	0	22	47	101	36	8	25	3	53	122
St. Cloud State	28	1	26	1	1	5	23	135	35	1	33	1	31	177
Championship: Wisconsin † indicates conference regular season champion * indicates conference tournament champion Current rankings: USCHO.com Division I women's poll

== Regular season ==
=== News and notes ===
- September 13: The Minnesota-Bulldogs visit the White House and are honored in a Rose Garden ceremony with President Barack Obama as the 2010 NCAA National Champions.
- October 1: In her first game as a Golden Gopher, Amanda Kessel registered four points (two goals, two assists) in a 5–0 victory over Clarkson. The following day, Kessel scored the game-winning goal as the Gophers won by a 3–0 score.
- Oct 5: North Dakota was ranked 10th in the Uscho.com poll. It is only the second time in program history that the club was in the top 10 in either the USA Today or Uscho.com poll. The last time came during the 2008–09 season after a 7-2-1 start.
- Oct 11: In front of 1,469 fans, the Fighting Sioux defeated top-ranked Minnesota Duluth by a 4–2 mark. It marks the second time in the past two seasons that the Sioux have defeated a number one ranked team. The first time North Dakota beat a #1 team was against Wisconsin in 2009. This is also the first time that the Sioux have beaten the Bulldogs at home (and the third win against them ever).
- October 16: Alana McElhinney made a career-high 56 saves. In the game, Bemidji State had its first-ever win over a No. 1-ranked team as they defeated the Mercyhurst Lakers by a 5–3 mark.
- October 29–30: Erin Cody had the biggest weekend of her collegiate career. She was involved in all seven of the Bemidji State's goals, as the Beavers swept St. Cloud State. Cody had five goals and two assists, and was a factor in both game-winning goals. Cody earned the First Star of the Game honors in both games. In the first game, Cody scored a natural hat trick (a power-play, shorthanded, and even-strength goal). All three goals were scored in the first period and set a Beavers record for most goals scored by a single player in one period. In the second game, Cody had two goals and two assists.
- October 22: Rookie Kathleen Rogan scored a hat trick as Minnesota State beat eighth ranked North Dakota. Rogan's hat trick marks is the first for Minnesota State since Maverick Ashley Young scored three goals against Bemidji State in 2008.
- On October 23, 2010, Jocelyne Lamoureux had a hat trick and one assist. In addition, one of her goals was the game-winning goal. The hat trick was the first by a North Dakota player since Cami Wooster in 2005.
- Jan 21-22: Wisconsin right winter Meghan Duggan led the top-ranked Badgers with four scoring points in a win and tie at defending national champion Minnesota Duluth. Duggan registered two goals and two assists against the Bulldogs, recorded nine shots on goal and finished with a +4 plus/minus rating in the two games. She led all players with three points in the January 21 win (4-1). She scored the Badgers first goal of the game (it was the first women's college hockey goal scored at the Bulldogs new AMSOIL Arena). In the second period, she assisted on a power-play tally to give Wisconsin a 3–0 lead. In the final two minutes, she had an empty net goal. The following day, both clubs skated to a 4–4 tie (Wisconsin prevailed 2–1 in the shootout). Duggan assisted on the Badgers' second goal of the game and extended her current point streak to 22 games, the longest individual point streak in Wisconsin women's hockey history. On January 21, she broke the previous mark of 20 games set by Meghan Hunter from Oct. 14, 2000 to Jan. 12, 2001.
- The January 29, 2011 game between Wisconsin and Minnesota was played before a women's college hockey record crowd of 10,668.

=== National rankings ===
- October 12: The WCHA had five of its teams ranked in the two national polls for the week. It is believed to be the first time five WCHA teams have ever been ranked among the top 10 in the nation at one time.

Week of	WCHA schools	USA Today Rank	USCHO Rank
September 27	Minnesota Duluth; Minnesota; Wisconsin		1; 4; 5
October 4	Minnesota Duluth; Minnesota; Wisconsin; North Dakota		1; 4; 5
October 11	Minnesota; Wisconsin; Minnesota Duluth; North Dakota; Ohio State		3; 4; 5; 8; 10
October 18	Wisconsin; Minnesota Duluth; North Dakota; Minnesota; Ohio State		1; 4; 6; 8; 10
October 25			
November 1			
November 8			
November 15			
November 22			
November 29			

== In season honors ==
=== Players of the week ===
Throughout the conference regular season, WCHA offices names a player of the week each Monday.

Week	Player of the week
October 5	Hilary Knight, Wisconsin
October 12	Carolyne Prevost, Wisconsin
October 19	Laura McIntosh, Ohio State
October 26	Tie: Jocelyne Lamoureux, North Dakota and Anne Schleper, Minnesota
November 3	Erin Cody, Bemidji State
November 10	Nina Tikkinen, MSU-Mankato
November 17	Nina Tikkinen, MSU-Mankato
November 24	Haley Irwin, Minnesota-Duluth
December 1	Laura McIntosh, Ohio State
December 8	Haley Irwin, Minnesota Duluth
January 5	Hilary Knight, Wisconsin
January 12	(Tie) Monique Lamoureux-Kolls, North Dakota and Erin Johnson, Bemidji State
January 19	Hilary Knight, Wisconsin
January 26	Meghan Duggan, Wisconsin
February 2	Natalie Spooner, Ohio State
February 9	Amanda Kessel, Minnesota
February 16	Meghan Duggan, Wisconsin
February 23	Pernilla Winberg, Minnesota-Duluth
March 2	

=== Defensive Players of the week ===
Week	Def. Player of the week
October 5	Zuzana Tomcikova, Bemidji State
October 12	Stephanie Ney, North Dakota
October 19	Alana McElhinney, Bemidji State and Jordan Slavin, North Dakota
October 26	Noora Raty, Minnesota
November 3	Shannon Reilly, Ohio State
November 10	Jordan Slavin, North Dakota
November 17	Stephanie Ney, North Dakota
November 24	Noora Raty, Minnesota
December 1	Kim Martin, Minnesota-Duluth
December 8	Ashley Nixon, St. Cloud State
January 5	Anne Dronen, Wisconsin
January 12	Noora Raty, Minnesota
January 19	Monique Lamoureux, North Dakota
January 26	Stephanie Ney, North Dakota
February 2	Laura Fridfinnson, Minnesota Duluth
February 9	(Tie) Laura Fridfinnson, Minnesota Duluth; Monique Lamoureux, North Dakota
February 16	Jocelyne Larocque, Minnesota Duluth
February 23	Megan Bozek, Minnesota
March 2	

=== Rookies of the week ===
Throughout the conference regular season, WCHA offices names a rookie of the week each Monday.

Week	Player of the week
October 5	Amanda Kessel, Minnesota
October 12	Lisa Steffes, Ohio State
October 19	Becky Allis, Ohio State
October 26	Kathleen Rogan, Minnesota State University
November 3	Brittany Ammerman, Wisconsin
November 10	Brienna Gillanders, Minnesota-Duluth
November 17	Kathleen Rogan, Minnesota State University
November 24	Madison Kolls, Wisconsin
December 1	Alex Rigsby, Wisconsin
December 8	Kelly Terry, Minnesota
January 5	Madison Packer, Wisconsin
January 12	Amanda Kessel, Minnesota
January 19	Lisa Steffes, Ohio State
January 26	Sarah Davis, Minnesota
February 2	Alex Rigsby, Wisconsin
February 9	Jamie Kenyon, Minnesota-Duluth
February 16	Molli Mott, St. Cloud State
February 23	Madison Packer, Wisconsin
March 2	

== Postseason ==
=== 2011 WCHA Women's Ice Hockey Tournament ===
==== Final faceoff ====
Semifinals; March 5
1	Wisconsin	3
3	North Dakota	0
2	Minnesota	4
4	Minnesota Duluth	2

Championship Game; March 6
1	Wisconsin	5
2	Minnesota	4

=== NCAA tournament ===
- March 6: Three teams from the Western Collegiate Hockey Association, winners of the last 11 women's national championship, have been selected to play in the quarterfinals of the 2011 NCAA Div. 1 Hockey Championships. No. 1 Wisconsin (34-2-2) will host defending national champion Minnesota Duluth (22-8-3) in the quarterfinal round. The Badgers earned the WCHA's automatic berth to the national tournament after winning the WCHA FINAL FACE-OFF. Minnesota (26-9-2) will play at No. 3 seed Boston College (23-6-6). UW defeated Minnesota 5–4 in overtime in the championship game.

=== Awards and honors ===
- Brianna Decker, 2011 Second Team All-America
- Meghan Duggan, 2011 Patty Kazmaier Award winner
- Meghan Duggan, 2011 First Team All-America
- Hilary Knight, 2011 First Team All-America
- Jocelyne Larocque, 2011 First Team All-America selection
- Noora Raty, 2011 Second Team All-America

== See also ==
- National Collegiate Women's Ice Hockey Championship
- 2009–10 WCHA women's ice hockey season
- 2010–11 CHA women's ice hockey season
- 2010–11 Hockey East women's ice hockey season
- 2010–11 ECAC women's ice hockey season
