= 2010–11 St. Cloud State Huskies women's ice hockey season =

- Conference: WCHA
- Home ice: National Hockey Center

Rankings
- USA Today/USA Hockey Magazine: Not ranked
- USCHO.com/CBS College Sports: Not ranked

Record

Coaches and captains
- Head coach: Jeff Giesen
- Captain: Diana Karouzos
- Alternate captain(s): Ashley Nixon, Courtney Josefson and Brittany Toor

The St. Cloud State Huskies women's ice hockey team represented St. Cloud State University during the 2010–11 season. The club competed in the WCHA and attempted to reach the NCAA Frozen Four. However, the team only won one game all year.

== Exhibition ==
Date	Opponent	Score	Goal scorers
Sept 25	Univ. of Manitoba	1-1	Ellie Sitek
Oct 9	Minnesota Whitecaps	2-4	Kylie Lane, Alex Nelson

== Regular season ==
=== Season standings ===
2010–11 Western Collegiate Hockey Association standings
	Conference								Overall					
	GP	W	L	T	SW	PTS	GF	GA	GP	W	L	T	GF	GA
#1 Wisconsin†*	28	24	2	2	2	76	140	50	38	34	2	2	203	66
#3 Minnesota	28	18	8	2	1	57	100	52	37	26	9	2	131	65
#6 Minnesota Duluth	28	18	7	3	0	57	109	49	33	22	8	3	131	53
#8 North Dakota	28	16	10	2	0	50	96	79	36	20	13	3	116	103
Bemidji State	28	11	13	4	2	39	53	71	35	14	17	4	70	88
Ohio State	28	8	17	3	3	30	69	100	36	14	19	3	99	116
Minnesota State	28	7	20	1	0	22	47	101	36	8	25	3	53	122
St. Cloud State	28	1	26	1	1	5	23	135	35	1	33	1	31	177
Championship: Wisconsin † indicates conference regular season champion * indicates conference tournament champion Current rankings: USCHO.com Division I women's poll

== Awards and honors ==
- Molli Mott, WCHA Rookie of the Week (Week of February 16, 2011)
- Ashley Nixon, WCHA Defensive Player of the Week (Week of December 7, 2010)

== See also ==
- 2009–10 St. Cloud State Huskies women's ice hockey season
