= 2010–11 Wisconsin Badgers women's ice hockey season =

NCAA Division I National Champions WCHA Regular Season Champions WCHA Tournament Champions NCAA Championship Game, W 4–1 vs. Boston University
- Conference: 1st WCHA
- Home ice: Kohl Center

Rankings
- USA Today/USA Hockey Magazine: #1
- USCHO.com/CBS College Sports: #1

Record
- Overall: 37–2–2
- Home: 17–1–1
- Road: 14–1–1
- Neutral: 6–0–0

Coaches and captains
- Head coach: Mark Johnson
- Assistant coaches: Peter Johnson; Jackie Friesen; Tracey DeKeyser
- Captain: Meghan Duggan
- Alternate captain(s): Mallory Deluce; Geena Prough; Hilary Knight

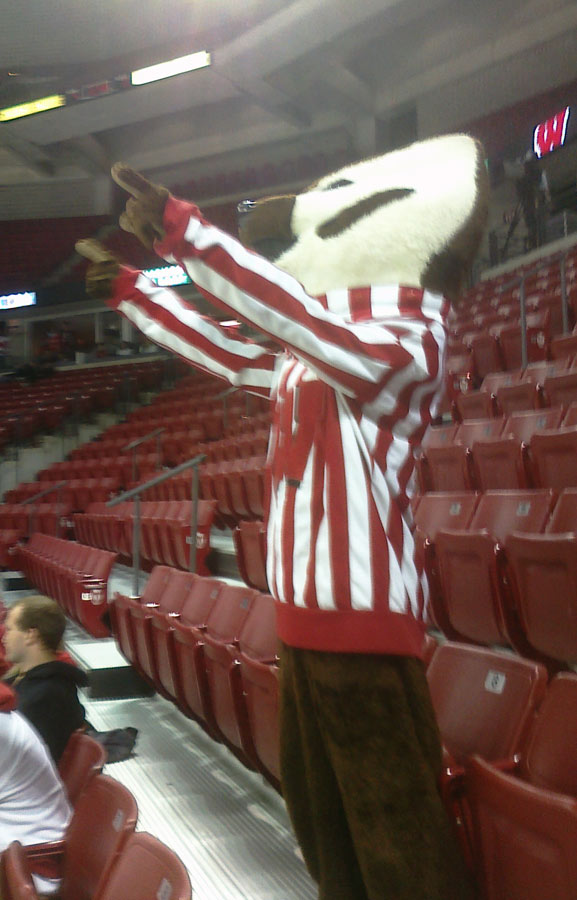
Opening day for the women's hockey team with Bucky the mascot (November 2010)

The Wisconsin Badgers women's ice hockey team represented the University of Wisconsin. The team finished the season by winning the school's fourth NCAA Women's Ice Hockey Championship. Senior captain, Meghan Duggan, was awarded the 2011 Patty Kazmaier Award.

== Offseason ==
- September 28: In the USA Today/USA Hockey Magazine Women's College Hockey Poll, the Badgers have been voted as the pre-season Number 5.

== News and notes ==
- October 2: Hilary Knight had a five-point game in a 6–0 victory over RPI. She had a natural hat trick to start the game and then had two assists.
- Carolyne Prevost had a four-goal series (two game-winners, a shorthanded goal, a power-play goal) as the Badgers swept Bemidji State in their league-opening series. She led the Badgers with a hat trick, including the game-winning goal, in a 7–1 victory over the Beavers in the first game. It was her second career hat trick as a Badger. In the second game (Oct 10), she had her second straight game-winning goal as the Badgers won 2–0. Prevost currently leads the nation with three game-winning goals in four games.
- Brittany Ammerman had two points (one goal, one assist) as Wisconsin swept rival Minnesota State. She scored Wisconsin's second goal of the game in a 3–2 win on October 29. Her older sister Brooke Ammerman assisted on the goal. She would get an assist in Wisconsin's final goal in the October 30th triumph. Ammerman finished the series with a +2 plus/minus rating.
- December 10–11: Brooke Ammerman led her team with six scoring points and was named the No. 1 star of both games as the Badgers swept league rival St. Cloud State. She tallied three goals and three assists, with three of her six points coming on the power-play. In addition, she recorded her second hat trick of the season and added one assist for four points in the December 11, 6–1 win over St. Cloud. Her hat trick included two powerplay goals and the game-winner. On December 10, Ammerman set up Madison Packer's goal at 10:02 of the first period to give the Badgers a 2–0 lead and followed up with another helper just 2:34 later. As of December 15, Ammerman is tied for the national lead with six power-play goals on the season. Her six points tied her career-high for a single series. Through 18 games played this season, Ammerman has produced 24 points on 10 goals and 14 assists.
- On December 10, Alex Rigsby earned her third collegiate shutout in a conference road victory at St. Cloud State. She improved her won-loss record to 11–1–0. At 11–1–0, Rigsby's .917 winning percentage tops the WCHA and is fourth in the nation. She also ranks third in the WCHA with a 1.86 goals-against average and is fifth in the league with a .919 save percentage.
- January 14 and 16: Hilary Knight produced eight scoring points while leading the Badgers to a two-game sweep of St. Cloud State. Knight accumulated five points on three goals and two assists in the January 14th 10–0 win. On the 16th, she had two more goals and one assist for three points as the Badgers won by a 6–0 mark. Of her five goals, two were scored on the power play, and one of the goals on January 14 was the game winner. With the sweep, the Badgers increased their winning streak to 10 straight games. Knight is the top goal scorer in Div. 1 women's hockey this season with 31.
- Jan 21–22: Wisconsin right winter Meghan Duggan led the top-ranked Badgers with four scoring points in a win and tie at defending national champion Minnesota Duluth. Duggan registered two goals and two assists against the Bulldogs, recorded nine shots on goal and finished with a +4 plus/minus rating in the two games. She led all players with three points in the January 21 win (4–1). She scored the Badgers first goal of the game (it was the first women's college hockey goal scored at the Bulldogs new AMSOIL Arena). In the second period, she assisted on a power-play tally to give Wisconsin a 3–0 lead. In the final two minutes, she had an empty net goal. The following day, both clubs skated to a 4–4 tie (Wisconsin prevailed 2–1 in the shootout). Duggan assisted on the Badgers’ second goal of the game and extended her current point streak to 22 games, the longest individual point streak in Wisconsin women's hockey history. On January 21, she broke the previous mark of 20 games set by Meghan Hunter from Oct. 14, 2000 to Jan. 12, 2001.
- January 28–29: Alex Rigsby made a combined 50 saves and allowed three goals as the top-ranked Badgers earned a tie and victory against Minnesota. She 23 saves on January 28 in a 2–2 overtime tie. The following day, she made 27 saves while earning her 17th victory of the season. The match was played before a women's college hockey record crowd of 10,668. Over the two game period, she had a .943 saves percentage and had four shutout periods, including the one 5:00 overtime segment. She is now unbeaten in her last 11 games and her .900 winning percentage leads the WCHA. Her 1.95 GAA is first in the WCHA.
- February 5: Hilary Knight scored her 36th goal of the year at 2:46 in the overtime period as Wisconsin defeated the Bemidji State Beavers by a 3–2 mark at the Sanford Center. Bemidji State goalie Alana McElhinney made 43 saves on the night including 24 in the second period.
- In front of 3,783 fans at the Kohl Center on February 12, ten Badgers recorded points as the Badgers defeated North Dakota by an 8–4 mark. The game marked the final regular season game for seniors Mallory Deluce, Anne Dronen, Meghan Duggan, Kelly Nash, Carla Pentimone and Geena Prough.
- March 20: The Wisconsin Badgers bested the Boston University Terriers by a 4–1 mark to claim the 2011 NCAA Frozen Four. Wisconsin finished the championship season on a 27-game unbeaten streak, posting a 25–0–2 record since losing to WCHA rival Minnesota Duluth on November 28, 2010. The Frozen Four match marked the first meeting between Wisconsin and Boston University in women's hockey history. The match marked the Badgers 37th win of the season. It set a record for the most wins in a single season in NCAA women's hockey history. The previous mark of 36 wins was set by three teams: Minnesota (36–2–2) in 2005; Wisconsin (36–4–1) in 2006; Wisconsin (36–1–4) in 2007.
- May 9: The official groundbreaking ceremony for Le Bahn Arena took place. The arena will serve as the new women's ice hockey game and practice facility, and host the new men's ice hockey practice facility.
- May 20: The city of Sun Valley, Idaho declared May 19, 2011 as Hilary Knight Day.

== Regular season ==
=== Standings ===
2010–11 Western Collegiate Hockey Association standings
| | Conference | | | | | | | | Overall | | | | | |
| | GP | W | L | T | SW | PTS | GF | GA | GP | W | L | T | GF | GA |
|---|---|---|---|---|---|---|---|---|---|---|---|---|---|---|
| #1 Wisconsin†* | 28 | 24 | 2 | 2 | 2 | 76 | 140 | 50 | 38 | 34 | 2 | 2 | 203 | 66 |
| #3 Minnesota | 28 | 18 | 8 | 2 | 1 | 57 | 100 | 52 | 37 | 26 | 9 | 2 | 131 | 65 |
| #6 Minnesota Duluth | 28 | 18 | 7 | 3 | 0 | 57 | 109 | 49 | 33 | 22 | 8 | 3 | 131 | 53 |
| #8 North Dakota | 28 | 16 | 10 | 2 | 0 | 50 | 96 | 79 | 36 | 20 | 13 | 3 | 116 | 103 |
| Bemidji State | 28 | 11 | 13 | 4 | 2 | 39 | 53 | 71 | 35 | 14 | 17 | 4 | 70 | 88 |
| Ohio State | 28 | 8 | 17 | 3 | 3 | 30 | 69 | 100 | 36 | 14 | 19 | 3 | 99 | 116 |
| Minnesota State | 28 | 7 | 20 | 1 | 0 | 22 | 47 | 101 | 36 | 8 | 25 | 3 | 53 | 122 |
| St. Cloud State | 28 | 1 | 26 | 1 | 1 | 5 | 23 | 135 | 35 | 1 | 33 | 1 | 31 | 177 |
Championship: Wisconsin † indicates conference regular season champion * indicates conference tournament champion Current rankings: USCHO.com Division I women's poll

=== Schedule and results ===
- Green background indicates win (3 points).
- Yellow background indicates shootout win (2 points).
- Red background indicates loss (0 points).
- White background indicates tie (1 point).

2010–11 Schedule and Results

October: 8–0–0 (Home: 8–0–0; Road: 0–0–0)
| # | Date | Visitor | Score | Home | OT | Decision | Attendance | WCHA | Overall | Box score |
| 1† | October 1 | Rensselaer | 0–7 | Wisconsin | | Ruegsegger | 1,972 | 0-0-0-0 | 1–0–0 |
| 2† | October 2 | Rensselaer | 0–6 | Wisconsin | | Rigsby | 1,819 | 0-0-0-0 | 2–0–0 |
| 3 | October 8 | Bemidji State | 1–7 | Wisconsin | | Rigsby | 1,923 | 1–0–0–0 | 3–0–0 |
| 4 | October 10 | Bemidji State | 0–2 | Wisconsin | | Ruegsegger | 1,766 | 2–0–0–0 | 4–0–0 |
| 5 | October 22 | Ohio State | 5–6 | Wisconsin | OT | Rigsby | 2,048 | 3–0–0–0 | 5–0–0 |
| 6 | October 23 | Ohio State | 2–5 | Wisconsin | | Ruegsegger | 2,396 | 4–0–0–0 | 6–0–0 |
| 7 | October 29 | Minnesota State | 2–3 | Wisconsin | | Rigsby | 2,510 | 5–0–0–0 | 7–0–0 |
| 8 | October 30 | Minnesota State | 1–6 | Wisconsin | | Ruegsegger | 1,964 | 6–0–0–0 | 8–0–0 |

November: 4–2–0 (Home: 1–1–0; Road: 3–1–0)
| # | Date | Visitor | Score | Home | OT | Decision | Attendance | WCHA | Overall | Box score |
| 9 | November 5 | Wisconsin | 5–7 | Minnesota | | Ruegsegger | 977 | 6–1–0–0 | 8–1–0 |
| 10 | November 6 | Wisconsin | 5–0 | Minnesota | | Rigsby | 1,129 | 7–1–0–0 | 9–1–0 |
| 11† | November 19 | Wisconsin | 7–1 | Robert Morris | | Rigsby | 121 | 7–1–0–0 | 10–1–0 |
| 12† | November 20 | Wisconsin | 7–1 | Robert Morris | | Rigsby | 142 | 7–1–0–0 | 11–1–0 |
| 13 | November 26 | Minnesota Duluth | 2–3 | Wisconsin | OT | Rigsby | 2,357 | 8–1–0–0 | 12–1–0 |
| 14 | November 28 | Minnesota Duluth | 3–1 | Wisconsin | | Rigsby | 2,151 | 8–2–0–0 | 12–2–0 |

December: 4–0–0 (Home: 0–0–0; Road: 4–0–0)
| # | Date | Visitor | Score | Home | OT | Decision | Attendance | WCHA | Overall | Box score |
| 15 | December 4 | Wisconsin | 4–3 | North Dakota | | Rigsby | 886 | 9–2–0–0 | 13–2–0–0 |
| 16 | December 5 | Wisconsin | 6–2 | North Dakota | | Rigsby | 847 | 10–2–0–0 | 14–2–0–0 |
| 17 | December 10 | Wisconsin | 5–0 | St. Cloud State | | Rigsby | 279 | 11–2–0–0 | 15–2–0 |
| 18 | December 11 | Wisconsin | 6–1 | St. Cloud State | | Ruegsegger | 123 | 12–2–0–0 | 16–2–0 |

January: 8–0–2 (Home: 3–0–1; Road: 3–0–1; Neutral: 2–0–0)
| # | Date | Visitor | Score | Home | OT | Decision | Attendance | WCHA | Overall | Box score |
| 19†* | January 1 | Wisconsin | 7–2 | Northeastern | | Ruegsegger | 241 | 12–2–0–0 | 17–2–0 |
| 20†* | January 2 | Mercyhurst | 4–7 | Wisconsin | | Rigsby | 307 | 12–2–0–0 | 18–2–0 |
| 21 | January 7 | Wisconsin | 6–2 | Ohio State | | Rigsby | 363 | 13–2–0–0 | 19–2–0 |
| 22 | January 8 | Wisconsin | 5–3 | Ohio State | | Rigsby | 366 | 14–2–0–0 | 20–2–0 |
| 23 | January 14 | St. Cloud State | 0–10 | Wisconsin | | Ruegsegger | 2,232 | 15–2–0–0 | 21–2–0 |
| 24 | January 16 | St. Cloud State | 0–6 | Wisconsin | | Rigsby | 3,854 | 16–2–0–0 | 22–2–0 |
| 25 | January 21 | Wisconsin | 4–1 | Minnesota Duluth | | Rigsby | 1,639 | 17–2–0–0 | 23–2–0 |
| 26 | January 22 | Wisconsin | 4–4 | Minnesota Duluth | OT | Rigsby | 1,411 | 17–2–1–1 | 23–2–1 |
| 27 | January 28 | Minnesota | 2–2 | Wisconsin | OT | Rigsby | 2,541 | 17–2–2–2 | 23–2–2 |
| 28 | January 29 | Minnesota | 1–3 | Wisconsin | | Rigsby | 10,668 | 18–2–2–2 | 24–2–2 |

February: 8–0–0 (Home: 4–0–0; Road: 4–0–0)
| # | Date | Visitor | Score | Home | OT | Decision | Attendance | WCHA | Overall | Box score |
| 29 | February 4 | Wisconsin | 7–1 | Bemidji State | | Ruegsegger | 231 | 19–2–2–2 | 25–2–2 |
| 30 | February 5 | Wisconsin | 3–2 | Bemidji State | OT | Rigsby | 261 | 20–2–2–2 | 26–2–2 |
| 31 | February 11 | North Dakota | 0–5 | Wisconsin | | Rigsby | 2,978 | 21–2–2–2 | 27–2–2 |
| 32 | February 13 | North Dakota | 4–8 | Wisconsin | | Ruegsegger | 3,783 | 22–2–2–2 | 28–2–2 |
| 33 | February 18 | Wisconsin | 4–0 | Minnesota State | | Rigsby | 86 | 23–2–2–2 | 29–2–2 |
| 34 | February 19 | Wisconsin | 9–1 | Minnesota State | | Ruegsegger | 113 | 24–2–2–2 | 30–2–2 |
| 35†‡ | February 25 | St. Cloud State | 3–9 | Wisconsin | | Rigsby | 817 | 24–2–2–2 | 31–2–2 |
| 36†‡ | February 26 | St. Cloud State | 1–5 | Wisconsin | | Rigsby | 804 | 24–2–2–2 | 32–2–2 |

March: 5–0–0 (Home: 1–0–0; Road: 0–0–0; Neutral: 4–0–0)
| # | Date | Visitor | Score | Home | OT | Decision | Attendance | WCHA | Overall | Box score |
| 37†° | March 4 | North Dakota | 0–3 | Wisconsin | | Rigsby | | 24–2–2–2 | 33–2–2 |
| 38†Ħ | March 5 | Minnesota | 4–5 | Wisconsin | OT | Rigsby | 1,176 | 24–2–2–2 | 34–2–2 |
| 39†¤ | March 12 | Minnesota Duluth | 1–2 | Wisconsin | | Rigsby | 4,006 | 24–2–2–2 | 35–2–2 |
| 40†¥ | March 18 | Boston College | 2–3 | Wisconsin | | Rigsby | 3,482 | 24–2–2–2 | 36–2–2 |
| 41†§ | March 18 | Boston University | 1–4 | Wisconsin | | Rigsby | 3,956 | 24–2–2–2 | 37–2–2 |

† Non-conference game * Easton Holiday Showcase ‡ 2011 WCHA Women's Ice Hockey Tournament first-round game ° 2011 WCHA Women's Ice Hockey Tournament semifinal game
Ħ 2011 WCHA Women's Ice Hockey Tournament championship game ¤ 2011 NCAA Quarterfinal game ¥ 2011 NCAA Semifinal game § 2011 NCAA Championship game

== Home attendance ==
Wisconsin led all Division I women's ice hockey programs in both average and total attendance, averaging 2,768 spectators and totaling 52,589 spectators. It was the program's fifth consecutive season leading in these attendance metrics.

The 10,688 spectators at the January 29 home game against Minnesota set a new (since surpassed) record for single-game attendance attendance in NCAA Division I women's ice hockey, surpassing the previous record of 8,263 spectators that had been set the previous season by Wisconsin's Camp Randall Hockey Classic home game against Bemidji State at Camp Randall Stadium.

== Awards and honors ==
- Brittany Ammerman, WCHA Rookie of the Week (Week of November 3, 2010)
- Brooke Ammerman, WCHA Offensive Player of the Week (Week of December 15)
- Meghan Duggan, WCHA Offensive Player of the Week (Week of January 26, 2011)
- Meghan Duggan, WCHA Offensive Player of the Week (Week of February 16, 2011)
- Anne Dronen, WCHA Defensive Player of the Week (Week of January 5)
- Hilary Knight, WCHA Offensive Player of the Week (Week of October 5)
- Hilary Knight, WCHA Offensive Player of the Week (Week of January 5)
- Hilary Knight, WCHA Offensive Player of the Week (Week of January 19, 2011)
- Madison Packer, WCHA Rookie of the Week (Week of January 5)
- Madison Packer, WCHA Rookie of the Week (Week of February 23)
- Carolyne Prevost, WCHA Offensive Player of the Week (Week of October 12)
- Carolyne Prevost, Capital One Academic All-District honors (Academic All-District 5 Second Team)
- Alex Rigsby, WCHA Defensive Player of the Week (Week of December 15)
- Alex Rigsby, WCHA Rookie of the Week (Week of February 2, 2011)
- Becca Ruegsegger, Capital One Academic All-District honors (Academic All-District 5 First Team)

=== Postseason honors ===
- Brianna Decker, All-WCHA First Team (2010–11)
- Brianna Decker, WCHA Final Face-off Most Valuable Player (2010–11)
- Meghan Duggan, WCHA Player of the Year
- Meghan Duggan, WCHA scoring champion
- Meghan Duggan, 2011 Patty Kazmaier Award Winner
- Meghan Duggan and Hillary Knight, shared Frozen Four MVP honors
- Meghan Duggan, 2011 Big Ten Outstanding Sportsmanship Award
- Meghan Duggan, 2011 Bob Allen Women's Player of the Year, awarded by USA Hockey
- Mark Johnson, WCHA Coach of the Year
- Mark Johnson, Finalist, 2011 AHCA Women's Ice Hockey Division I Coach of the Year
- Becca Ruegsegger, NCAA Elite 88 Award

==== Frozen Four All-Tournament team ====
- Forward: Brooke Ammerman, Wisconsin
- Forward: Meghan Duggan, Wisconsin
- Forward: Carolyne Prevost, Wisconsin
- Defense: Alev Kelter, Wisconsin

=== All-Americans ===
- Brianna Decker, 2011 Second Team All-America
- Meghan Duggan, 2011 First Team All-America
- Hilary Knight, 2011 First Team All-America

=== Team awards ===
- Brianna Decker, Top student-athlete award (female)
- Carla Pentimone, Community service award
- Carolyne Prevost, Chi Alpha Sigma Student-Athlete Honor Society inductee
- Brittany Haverstock, Wisconsin Performance award (one of 10 student athletes who won)
- Becca Ruegsegger, 4.0 recognition award

== CWHL draft picks ==
The following Badgers (including alumni) were selected in the 2011 CWHL Draft.

| Player | Pick | Team |
|---|---|---|
| Meaghan Mikkelson | 3 | Team Alberta CWHL |
| Meghan Duggan | 8 | Boston Blades |
| Bobbi-Jo Slusar | 9 | Team Alberta CWHL |
| Mallory Deluce | 11 | Toronto CWHL |
| Jessie Vetter | 20 | Boston Blades |

== See also ==
- 2010-11 Wisconsin Badgers men's ice hockey season
