= 2022–23 WCHA women's ice hockey season =

2022–23 WCHA women's season
- Season: 2020–21
- Conference: WCHA
- Division: Division I
- Sport: women's ice hockey
- Duration: September 30, 2022– February 19, 2023
- Number of teams: 8

Regular Season
- Season champions: Ohio State

WCHA Tournament
- Tournament champions: Minnesota

NCAA Tournament
- Bids: 4
- Best Finish: Champions
- Team(s): Wisconsin

The 2022–23 WCHA women's ice hockey season was the 24th season of the Western Collegiate Hockey Association and took place during the 2022–23 NCAA Division I women's ice hockey season. The regular season began on September 30, 2022, and ended on February 19, 2023.

== Standings ==
2022–23 Western Collegiate Hockey Association standings
	Conference								Overall					
	GP	W	L	T	SOW	PTS	GF	GA	GP	W	L	T	GF	GA
#2 Ohio State †	28	23	4	1	1	70	119	52	40	33	6	2	169	71
#3 Minnesota *	28	22	3	3	1	68	126	52	39	30	6	3	177	72
#1 Wisconsin	27	19	6	2	1	60	113	46	40	29	10	2	169	67
#7 Minnesota Duluth	28	17	8	3	2	54	87	44	39	26	10	3	125	53
#12 St. Cloud State	28	11	16	1	0	36	57	82	37	18	18	1	87	96
Minnesota State	28	9	18	1	0	30	55	92	36	15	20	1	91	105
St. Thomas	28	3	24	1	1	12	30	110	36	8	27	1	53	130
Bemidji State	28	2	26	0	0	6	23	130	36	5	30	1	40	154
Championship: March 4, 2023 † indicates conference regular season champion; * indicates conference tournament champion Rankings: USCHO.com; updated March 19, 2023

== Conference tournament ==
Quarterfinals; February 24, 25
8	Bemidji State	1	1	—
1	Ohio State	4	2	—
5	St. Cloud State	0	1	—
4	Minnesota-Duluth	1	5	—
7	St. Thomas	0	2	—
2	Minnesota	7	6	—
6	Minnesota State	0	1	—
3	Wisconsin	3	4	—

Semifinals; March 3
1	Ohio State	2
4	Minnesota-Duluth	1
2	Minnesota	4
3	Wisconsin	2

Championship; March 4
1	Ohio State	1
2	Minnesota	3

Note: * denotes overtime period(s)

== Awards ==
=== NCAA ===
Sophie Jaques of Ohio State won the Patty Kazmaier Award.

=== WCHA ===
==== All-Tournament Team ====
The All-Tournament Team contained five players from Minnesota and one from Ohio State.

- F: Abbey Murphy* (Minnesota)
- F: Peyton Hemp (Minnesota)
- F: Taylor Heise (Minnesota)
- D: Madeline Wethington (Minnesota)
- D: Sophie Jaques (Ohio State)
- G: Skylar Vetter (Minnesota)

* Most Outstanding Player
