= 2008–09 WCHA women's ice hockey season =

American college ice hockey season

The 2008-09 WCHA hockey season was the 10th season of WCHA women's play. Since its inception, WCHA teams have won the national championship every season. The defending NCAA champions were the WCHA's Minnesota Duluth Bulldogs.

== Season outlook ==
- Sept 23, 2008: The University of Minnesota Duluth, was the pre-season choice to repeat as Western Collegiate Hockey Association champions in 2008–09, according to league coaches.

The Bulldogs received five first-place votes and a total of 47 points in the pre-season poll (league coaches could not vote for their own team). The Bulldogs edged the Minnesota Golden Gophers, which grabbed two first-place votes, and the Wisconsin Badgers, which had one 1st place vote. UMD, Wisconsin and Minnesota were ranked first through third in the national USA Today/US Hockey Magazine preseason college hockey poll as well. For the second consecutive season, league-member coaches have picked Minnesota Golden Gophers senior forward Gigi Marvin as the pre-season most valuable player. Four other players: Wisconsin forwards Meghan Duggan and Erika Lawler plus Minnesota Duluth goaltender Kim Martin, a Patty Kazmaier finalist last year, and teammate Haley Irwin, the forward who led the league in scoring with 60 points last season - also received votes for preseason MVP. Forward Pernilla Winberg of the University of Minnesota Duluth was selected as the pre-season WCHA Rookie of the Year. Others receiving votes included Jocelyne Lamoureux, a forward from the University of Minnesota.

== Regular season ==
- Gigi Marvin tallied three points in the 4–3 overtime win over Minnesota Duluth (October 10). She netted three goals in the series sweep over St. Cloud State to earn her first WCHA Offensive Player of the Week Honors. Her second conference honor was received when she scored four goals en route to a sweep over North Dakota (December 5–6). In a 5–2 win over North Dakota, she recorded her first career hat trick. The first series of the second half of the season was notable for Marvin. She had a career-high six points in one game while accumulating eight total points in the series sweep over Niagara (January 3–4). On January 9, she had three points in a 9–2 win over. She scored a goal and three assists in the 9–1 win over Minnesota State on January 30. In the series sweep over North Dakota from February 13–14, she had a goal and two assists in the series sweep over North Dakota. In the St. Cloud State Series, which was played from February 20–21, she added three goals and an assist. It was in the St. Cloud State Series that the Gophers clinched the WCHA regular season championship.
- As a freshman in 2008–09, Jocelyne Lamoureux finished second on the team and fourth in the nation with 65 points (28 goals, 37 assists). The Gophers appeared in the NCAA Women's Frozen Four. At season's end, she was earned All-WCHA First Team and All-WCHA Rookie Team honors.
- In 2008–09, Monique Lamoureux was a freshman for the Gophers but was the team's third leading goal scorer, and a second team All-America selection. By mid-February 2009, Monique was leading the nation with 64 points on 32 assists and 32 goals. By season’ end, she ranked third in the NCAA and first among rookies with 75 points in 40 games (39 goals, 36 assists). She ranked second in the nation with five shorthanded goals and tied for third with eight game-winners. She participated in her first Frozen Four that season. In addition, she was the WCHA scoring champion, and WCHA Rookie of the Year. She was the only freshman to be named a top-10 finalist for Patty Kazmaier Memorial Award.

== Postseason ==
Jessie Vetter was the WCHA Final Face-Off MVP as Wisconsin won the League championship and garnered the top seed going into the NCAA championships.

== Awards and honors ==
- Patty Kazmaier Award, Jessie Vetter, Wisconsin
- WCHA Defensive Player of the Year, Melanie Gagnon, Senior, Defenseman, Minnesota
- WCHA Rookie of the Year, Monique Lamoureux, Freshman, Forward, Minnesota
- WCHA Outstanding Student-Athlete of the Year, Gigi Marvin, Senior, Forward, Minnesota
- WCHA Coach of the Year (tie), Brad Frost, Head Coach, Minnesota and Mark Johnson, Head Coach, Wisconsin
- WCHA Scoring Champion, Monique Lamoureux, Freshman, Forward, Minnesota
- WCHA Goaltending Champion, Alyssa Grogan, Freshman, Goaltender, Minnesota

=== All-WCHA Teams ===
- First Team

| Player | Class | Position | School |
| Hilary Knight | Sophomore | Forward | Wisconsin |
| Monique Lamoureux | Freshman | Forward | Wisconsin |
| Jocelyne Lamoureux | Freshman | Forward | Wisconsin |
| Melanie Gagnon | Senior | Defense | Wisconsin |
| Jocelyne Larocque | Sophomore | Defense | Minnesota Duluth |
| Jessie Vetter | Senior | Goaltender | Wisconsin |

- Second Team

| Player | Class | Position | School |
| Gigi Marvin | Senior | Forward | Minnesota |
| Erika Lawler | Senior | Forward | Wisconsin |
| Elin Holmlöv | Junior | Forward | Minnesota Duluth |
| Rachael Drazan | Senior | Defense | Minnesota |
| Anne Schleper | Freshman | Defense | Minnesota |
| Zuzana Tomcikova | Freshman | Goaltender | Bemidji State |

- Third Team

| Player | Class | Position | School |
| Meghan Duggan | Junior | Forward | Wisconsin |
| Haley Irwin | Sophomore | Forward | Minnesota Duluth |
| Brooke Ammerman | Freshman | Forward | Wisconsin |
| Alycia Matthews | Senior | Defense | Wisconsin |
| Jaime Rasmussen | Freshman | Defense | Minnesota Duluth |
| Kim Martin | Junior | Goaltender | Minnesota Duluth |

- All-Rookie Team

| Player | Position | School |
| Brooke Ammerman | Forward | Wisconsin |
| Monique Lamoureux | Forward | Minnesota |
| Jocelyne Lamoureux | Forward | Minnesota |
| Brittany Haverstock | Defense | Wisconsin |
| Anne Schleper | Defense | Minnesota |
| Zuzana Tomcikova | Goaltender | Wisconsin |

- All-Academic Team

| Player | Class | School |
| Kelli Blankenship | Junior | Minnesota |
| Rachael Drazan | Senior | Minnesota |
| Brittany Francis | Junior | Minnesota |
| Melanie Gagnon | Senior | Minnesota |
| Gigi Marvin | Senior | Minnesota |
| Michelle Maunu | Junior | Minnesota |
| Terra Rasmussen | Sophomore | Minnesota |
| Dagney Willey | Senior | Minnesota |
| Alexandra Zebro | Junior | Minnesota |

== Team of the Decade ==
| Player | Position | School | Nationality |
|---|---|---|---|
| Sara Bauer | Forward | Wisconsin | Canada |
| Tessa Bonhomme | Defense | Ohio State | Canada |
| Ronda Curtin | Defense | Minnesota | United States |
| Natalie Darwitz | Forward | Minnesota | United States |
| Molly Engstrom | Defense | Wisconsin | United States |
| Caroline Ouellette | Forward | Minnesota Duluth | Canada |
| Jenny Schmidgall-Potter | Forward | Minnesota and Minnesota Duluth | United States |
| Maria Rooth | Forward | Minnesota Duluth | Sweden |
| Jessie Vetter | Goaltender | Wisconsin | United States |
| Krissy Wendell | Forward | Minnesota | United States |

== See also ==
- National Collegiate Women's Ice Hockey Championship
- 2009–10 WCHA women's ice hockey season
- 2010–11 WCHA women's ice hockey season
