= 2010–11 Minnesota Golden Gophers women's ice hockey season =

2011 NCAA tournament, Lost Regionals, 4–1 vs. Boston College
- Conference: 2 WCHA
- Home ice: Ridder Arena

Rankings
- USCHO.com/CBS College Sports: 6

Record
- Overall: 26–10–2
- Conference: 18–8–2
- Home: 15–3–1
- Road: 10–6–1
- Neutral: 1–1–0

Coaches and captains
- Head coach: Brad Frost
- Assistant coaches: Joel Johnson
- Captain(s): Emily West; Terra Rasmussen; Sarah Erickson; Jen Schoullis; Anne Schleper

The 2010–11 Minnesota Golden Gophers women's ice hockey season represented the University of Minnesota during the 2010–11 NCAA Division I women's ice hockey season. They were coached by Brad Frost in his fourth season.

== Offseason ==
- June 18: Six University of Minnesota players have been named to the United States Under-22 Team. Megan Bozek, Sarah Erickson, Amanda Kessel, Anne Schleper, Jen Schoullis and Emily West have all been named to the team. The Minnesota contingent is the largest group from one school. The U22 team will depart from the Festival early and travel to Toronto to compete in the three-game Under-22 Series against Canada from August 18–21.
- June 18: Brad Frost announced the hiring of Joel Johnson as an assistant coach. Johnson was the head coach of the Bethel University men's hockey team. Previously, he was an assistant coach during the Golden Gophers' 2000 and 2004 national championships. Johnson replaces Jamie Wood, who accepted an associate head coaching position at the University of New Hampshire.

== Exhibition ==
Date	Opponent	Location	Time	Score	Goal scorers
Sun, Sep 26	Manitoba	Ridder Arena	2:00 PM	8–0	Amanda Kessel (3), Emily West (2), Jen Schoullis, Becky Kortum, Nikki Ludwigson
Fri, Oct 8	Minnesota Whitecaps	Ridder Arena	6:00 PM	3–2	Jen Schoulis (2), Sarah Davis

== Regular season ==
- October 1: In her first game as a Golden Gopher, Amanda Kessel registered four points (two goals, two assists). The following day, Kessel scored the game-winning goal as the Gophers won by a 3–0 score. The game against Clarkson marked the first time in school history that the Gophers opened a season against a ranked opponent.
- October 9: With the 1–0 shutout over Wayne State, the Gophers have not allowed a goal in 180 minutes. Dating back to the 2009–10 season, Minnesota has not allowed a goal in 200:45 minutes played.
- October 22–23: Anne Schleper had six points (1 goal, 5 assists), including four points on the power-play. In the first game, Schleper tied a career-high with four points. She assisted on Sarah Davis' game-winning power-play goal. The following day, Schleper assisted on two of Minnesota's three power-play goals. Schleper is the first defender to earn the league's weekly offensive honor since Minnesota Duluth's Jocelyne Larocque on January 28, 2009.
- October 22–23: Noora Räty recorded back to back shutouts against the St. Cloud State Huskies. She held the Huskies scoreless as Minnesota swept the series by scores of 5–0 and 3–0, respectively. Raty played the full 120:00 minutes of the series. She accumulated14 saves in the first game, while posting 18 in the second game. In the season, she has yet to allow a goal, holding a 1.000 save percentage and a 0.00 goalsagainst

average.

- The January 29, 2011, game between Wisconsin and Minnesota was played before a women's college hockey record crowd of 10,668.
- Feb. 5: The Golden Gophers had four different skaters score goals in a 4–1 win over St. Cloud State. Amanda Kessel contributed with a goal and two assists as the Gophers earned their 20th win of the season. With the win and a Bemidji State loss to Wisconsin, the Gophers have clinched home ice for the first round of the WCHA playoffs.
- February 4–5: Amanda Kessel produced three goals and seven points to lead the Golden Gophers to a two-game home-ice series sweep over St. Cloud State. On February 4, she scored two goals and set up two others for four points as the Gophers prevailed by an 8–0 mark. Her four points tied a career game high, which came against Clarkson in her first collegiate game on Oct. 1. The following day, she was involved in all three Gophers goals, as she scored one and assisted on two. One of the assists was Ashley Stenerson's first collegiate goal.

=== Standings ===
2010–11 Western Collegiate Hockey Association standings
	Conference								Overall					
	GP	W	L	T	SW	PTS	GF	GA	GP	W	L	T	GF	GA
#1 Wisconsin†*	28	24	2	2	2	76	140	50	38	34	2	2	203	66
#3 Minnesota	28	18	8	2	1	57	100	52	37	26	9	2	131	65
#6 Minnesota Duluth	28	18	7	3	0	57	109	49	33	22	8	3	131	53
#8 North Dakota	28	16	10	2	0	50	96	79	36	20	13	3	116	103
Bemidji State	28	11	13	4	2	39	53	71	35	14	17	4	70	88
Ohio State	28	8	17	3	3	30	69	100	36	14	19	3	99	116
Minnesota State	28	7	20	1	0	22	47	101	36	8	25	3	53	122
St. Cloud State	28	1	26	1	1	5	23	135	35	1	33	1	31	177
Championship: Wisconsin † indicates conference regular season champion * indicates conference tournament champion Current rankings: USCHO.com Division I women's poll

=== Schedule ===
As of September 28, 2024.

Date	Time	Opponent^{#}	Rank^{#}	Site	Decision	Result	Attendance	Record
Regular Season
October 1	7:00	at #7 Clarkson*	#4	Cheel Arena • Potsdam, NY	Räty	W 5–0	908	1–0–0
October 2	3:00	at #7 Clarkson*	#4	Cheel Arena • Potsdam, NY	Grogan	W 3–0	435	2–0–0
October 9	2:07	Wayne State*	#4	Ridder Arena • Minneapolis, MN	Räty	W 1–0	620	3–0–0
October 15	6:07	#7 North Dakota	#3	Ridder Arena • Minneapolis, MN	Grogan	L 3–4	915	3–1–0 (0–1–0)
October 16	4:07	#7 North Dakota	#3	Ridder Arena • Minneapolis, MN	Grogan	L 1–3	921	3–2–0 (0–2–0)
October 22	7:07	at St. Cloud State	#7	Herb Brooks National Hockey Center • St. Cloud, MN	Räty	W 5–0	452	4–2–0 (1–2–0)
October 23	7:07	at St. Cloud State	#7	Herb Brooks National Hockey Center • St. Cloud, MN	Räty	W 3–0	521	5–2–0 (2–2–0)
October 29	7:07	at #3 Minnesota Duluth	#6	AMSOIL Arena • Duluth, MN	Räty	L 2–3	989	5–3–0 (2–3–0)
October 30	7:07	at #3 Minnesota Duluth	#6	AMSOIL Arena • Duluth, MN	Räty	L 2–4	874	5–4–0 (2–4–0)
November 5	6:07	#1 Wisconsin	#8	Ridder Arena • Minneapolis, MN	Räty	W 7–5	977	6–4–0 (3–4–0)
November 6	4:07	#1 Wisconsin	#8	Ridder Arena • Minneapolis, MN	Räty	L 0–5	1,129	6–5–0 (3–5–0)
November 19	7:07	at Minnesota State	#6	Verizon Wireless Center • Mankato, MN	Räty	W 1–0	412	7–5–0 (4–5–0)
November 20	3:07	at Minnesota State	#6	Verizon Wireless Center • Mankato, MN	Räty	W 6–2	316	8–5–0 (5–5–0)
November 26	6:07	#9 Harvard*	#7	Ridder Arena • Minneapolis, MN	Räty	W 3–0	946	9–5–0 (5–5–0)
November 28	1:07	#9 Harvard*	#7	Ridder Arena • Minneapolis, MN	Räty	W 4–2	977	10–5–0 (5–5–0)
December 3	2:07	at Bemidji State	#7	Sanford Center • Bemidji, MN	Räty	L 0–2	214	10–6–0 (5–6–0)
December 4	2:07	at Bemidji State	#7	John S. Glas Field House • Bemidji, MN	Räty	W 6–2	481	11–6–0 (6–6–0)
December 10	6:07	#10 Ohio State	#7	Ridder Arena • Minneapolis, MN	Räty	W 6–0	826	12–6–0 (7–6–0)
December 12	12:07	#10 Ohio State	#7	Ridder Arena • Minneapolis, MN	Räty	W 2–1 ^{OT}	403	13–6–0 (8–6–0)
January 7	6:07	Minnesota State	#7	Ridder Arena • Minneapolis, MN	Räty	W 4–0	625	14–6–0 (9–6–0)
January 8	4:05	Minnesota State	#7	Ridder Arena • Minneapolis, MN	Räty	W 5–1	758	15–6–0 (10–6–0)
January 14	7:07	#4 Minnesota Duluth	#7	Ridder Arena • Minneapolis, MN	Räty	T 2–2 ^{OT}	924	15–6–1 (10–6–1)
January 15	4:07	#4 Minnesota Duluth	#7	Ridder Arena • Minneapolis, MN	Räty	W 3–0	1,006	16–6–1 (11–6–1)
January 21	7:07	at Ohio State	#5	Ohio State University Ice Rink • Columbus, OH	Räty	W 4–2	302	17–6–1 (12–6–1)
January 22	4:07	at Ohio State	#5	Ohio State University Ice Rink • Columbus, OH	Räty	W 8–1	393	18–6–1 (13–6–1)
January 28	7:00	at #1 Wisconsin	#4	Kohl Center • Madison, WI	Räty	T 2–2 ^{OT}	2,541	18–6–2 (13–6–2)
January 29	7:07	at #1 Wisconsin	#4	Kohl Center • Madison, WI	Räty	L 1–3	10,668	18–7–2 (13–7–2)
February 4	7:07	St. Cloud State	#4	Ridder Arena • Minneapolis, MN	Lura	W 8–0	952	19–7–2 (14–7–2)
February 5	4:07	St. Cloud State	#4	Ridder Arena • Minneapolis, MN	Räty	W 4–1	1,013	20–7–2 (15–7–2)
February 11	6:07	Bemidji State	#4	Ridder Arena • Minneapolis, MN	Räty	W 4–1	843	21–7–2 (16–7–2)
February 12	4:07	Bemidji State	#4	Ridder Arena • Minneapolis, MN	Räty	W 3–0	977	22–7–2 (17–7–2)
February 18	7:07	at #8 North Dakota	#3	Ralph Engelstad Arena • Grand Forks, ND	Räty	W 5–3	3,158	23–7–2 (18–7–2)
February 19	7:07	at #8 North Dakota	#3	Ridder Arena • Minneapolis, MN	Räty	L 3–5	2,885	23–8–2 (18–8–2)
WCHA Tournament
February 25	6:07	Ohio State*	#3	Ridder Arena • Minneapolis, MN (WCHA Tournament, First Round, Game 1)	Räty	W 4–2	523	24–8–2 (18–8–2)
February 26	5:07	Ohio State*	#3	Ridder Arena • Minneapolis, MN (WCHA Tournament, First Round, Game 2)	Räty	W 3–2	593	25–8–2 (18–8–2)
March 4	7:07	#6 Minnesota Duluth*	#3	Ridder Arena • Minneapolis, MN (WCHA Tournament, Semifinal Game)	Räty	W 4–2	1,138	26–8–2 (18–8–2)
March 5	7:07	#1 Wisconsin*	#3	Ridder Arena • Minneapolis, MN (WCHA Tournament, Championship Game)	Räty	L 4–5 ^{OT}	1,176	26–9–2 (18–8–2)
NCAA Tournament
March 12	1:00	at #5 Boston College*	#3	Conte Forum • Chestnut Hill, MA (NCAA Tournament, First Round)	Räty	L 1–4	583	26–10–2 (18–8–2)
*Non-conference game. ^{#}Rankings from USCHO.com Poll.

=== Roster ===
No.	Nat.	Player	Class	Pos	Height	DoB	Hometown	Previous team
1		Jenny Lura	Senior	G	5' 8" (1.73 m)	1989-09-07	North Vancouver, British Columbia	Sentinel Secondary School
2		Kelly Seeler	Junior	D	5' 6" (1.68 m)	1990-05-18	Eden Prairie, Minnesota	Eden Prairie High School
3		Samantha Downey	Sophomore	F	5' 9" (1.75 m)	1991-02-19	Silver Bay, Minnesota	Proctor High School
4		Sarah Erickson	Junior	F	5' 6" (1.68 m)	1990-03-28	Roseau, Minnesota	Bemidji High School
5		Laura May	Senior	F	5' 8" (1.73 m)	1989-08-05	Dellwood, Minnesota	Mahtomedi High School
6		Katie Frischmann	Sophomore	F/D	5' 5" (1.65 m)	1991-01-06	Rochester, Minnesota	Minnesota Thoroughbreds
7		Mira Jalosuo	Freshman	D	6' 0" (1.83 m)	1989-02-03	Lieksa, Finland	Finland women's national ice hockey team
8		Amanda Kessel	Freshman	F	5' 6" (1.68 m)	1991-08-28	Madison, Wisconsin	Shattuck-Saint Mary's
9		Sarah Davis	Freshman	F	5' 4" (1.63 m)	1988-04-24	Paradise, Newfoundland	Warner Hockey School
10		Kelly Terry	Freshman	F	5' 6" (1.68 m)	1992-06-06	Whitby, Ontario	Sinclair Secondary School
11		Becky Kortum	Sophomore	F	5' 7" (1.7 m)	1991-05-07	Minnetonka, Minnesota	Hopkins High School
12		Ashley Stenerson	Freshman	F/D	5' 5" (1.65 m)	1991-10-09	Moorhead, Minnesota	Moorhead High School
16		Bethany Brausen	Freshman	F	5' 5" (1.65 m)	1992-05-16	Little Canada, Minnesota	Roseville Area High School
17		Emily West	Senior	F	5' 5" (1.65 m)	1989-03-22	Colorado Springs, Colorado	Pine Creek High School
18		Nikki Ludwigson	Junior	F	5' 7" (1.7 m)	1989-09-18	Bloomington, Minnesota	Eden Prairie High School
19		Megan Bozek	Sophomore	D	5' 9" (1.75 m)	1991-03-27	Buffalo Grove, Illinois	Chicago Mission
22		Anne Schleper	Junior	D	5' 10" (1.78 m)	1990-01-30	St. Cloud, Minnesota	Cathedral High School
24		Jen Schoullis	Junior (RS)	F	5' 9" (1.75 m)	1989-03-07	Erie, Pennsylvania	Shattuck-Saint Mary's
25		Terra Rasmussen	Senior	F	5' 7" (1.7 m)	1988-09-04	Coon Rapids, Minnesota	Coon Rapids High School
27		Baylee Gillanders	Freshman	D	5' 11" (1.8 m)	1992-08-09	Kyle, Saskatchewan	Warner Hockey School
33		Alyssa Grogan	Junior	G	5' 6" (1.68 m)	1990-05-15	Eagan, Minnesota	Eagan High School
41		Noora Räty	Sophomore	G	5' 5" (1.65 m)	1989-05-29	Espoo, Finland	Finland women's national ice hockey team

== Awards and honors ==
- Megan Bozek, WCHA Defensive Player of the Week (Week of February 23, 2011)
- Sarah Davis, WCHA Rookie of the Week, (Week of January 26, 2011)
- Amanda Kessel, WCHA Pre-Season Rookie of the Year
- Amanda Kessel, WCHA Rookie of the Week (Week of October 5)
- Amanda Kessel, WCHA Rookie of the Week (Week of December 15)
- Amanda Kessel, WCHA Offensive Player of the Week (Week of February 7)
- Noora Raty, WCHA Defensive Player of the Week (Week of October 27, 2010)
- Anne Schleper, WCHA co-Offensive Players of the Week (Week of October 27, 2010)
- Kelly Terry, WCHA Rookie of the Week (Week of December 7)

=== Postseason honors ===
- Amanda Kessel, WCHA Rookie of the Year
- Noora Raty, 2011 Second Team All-America selection
- Anne Schleper, 2011 Big Ten Outstanding Sportsmanship Award

==== WCHA First Team ====
- Noora Raty
- Anne Schleper

==== WCHA Third team ====
- Megan Bozek
- Amanda Kessel

==== WCHA All-Rookie Team ====
- Baylee Gillanders
- Amanda Kessel
- Kelly Terry

==== WCHA All-Academic Team ====
- Megan Bozek
- Samantha Downey
- Sarah Erickson
- Alyssa Grogan
- Mira Jalosuo
- Becky Kortum
- Nikki Ludwigson
- Jenny Lura
- Noora Räty
- Anne Schleper
