= St. Cloud State Huskies women's ice hockey =

- Current season
- University: St. Cloud State University
- Conference: WCHA
- Head coach: Mira Jalosuo; 1st season
- Assistant coaches: Jinelle Zaugg-Siergiej (assoc. HC); Noora Räty; Emily Ach
- Captain(s): Emma Gentry; Taylor Larson; Dayle Ross; Grace Wolfe
- Arena: Herb Brooks National Hockey Center; St. Cloud, Minnesota
- Colors: Cardinal and black

The St. Cloud State Huskies women's ice hockey team is a college ice hockey program representing St. Cloud State University in the Western Collegiate Hockey Association (WCHA) conference of NCAA Division I competition. They play at the Herb Brooks National Hockey Center in St. Cloud, Minnesota.

== History ==
In 2010, Felicia Nelson became the first Huskies player to be a Top-10 finalist for the Patty Kazmaier Award. The club had a 15–14–8 overall record in 2009–10 and an 11–11–6 mark in the WCHA. The team finished the season in third place. This was the first time in school and league history that St. Cloud State was one of the top three schools in the standings.

In the 2015–16 NCAA season, Katie Fitzgerald was the starting goaltender for the St. Cloud State University Huskies. She would lead all goaltenders in the WCHA conference in shots faced, appearing in 34 games played. Her final win on home ice at St. Cloud took place on February 12, as she made 39 saves in a win against North Dakota, besting All-America goaltender Shelby Amsley-Benzie.

== Season-by-season results ==
Won championship	Lost championship	Conference champions	League leader

Year	Coach	W	L	T	Conference	Conf. W	Conf. L	Conf. T	Finish	Conference Tournament	NCAA Tournament
1998–99	Kerry Brodt Wethington	8	10	2	WCHA						
1999–2000	Kerry Brodt Wethington	13	19	3	WCHA	6	15	4	4th WCHA	Lost Quarterfinals vs. Ohio State (2–3)	Did not qualify
2000–01	Kerry Brodt Wethington	17	16	2	WCHA	12	10	2	4th WCHA	Lost Quarterfinals vs. Ohio State (0–5)	Did not qualify
2001–02	Kerry Brodt Wethington	7	26	1	WCHA	6	17	1	6th WCHA	Did not qualify	Did not qualify
2002–03	Jason Lesteberg	11	23	0	WCHA	5	19	4	6th WCHA	Did not qualify	Did not qualify
2003–04	Jason Lesteberg	7	24	1	WCHA	4	19	1	6th WCHA	Did not qualify	Did not qualify
2004–05	Jason Lesteberg	9	22	4	WCHA	7	18	3	6th WCHA	Lost Quarterfinals vs. Wisconsin (1–3)	Did not qualify
2005–06	Jason Lesteberg	18	18	1	WCHA	13	14	1	4th WCHA	Won Quarterfinals vs. Ohio State (2–1 OT); Lost Semifinals vs. Wisconsin (0–9)	Did not qualify
2006–07	Jeff Giesen	12	18	7	WCHA	7	16	5	7th WCHA	Lost Quarterfinals vs. Minnesota Duluth (3–4, 3–1, 1–5)	Did not qualify
2007–08	Jeff Giesen	18	15	5	WCHA	11	13	4	4th WCHA	Won Quarterfinals vs. Ohio State (4–2, 0–3, 5–3); Lost Semifinals vs. Minnesota Duluth (0–9)	Did not qualify
2008–09	Jeff Giesen	15	18	4	WCHA	11	14	3	4th WCHA	Lost Quarterfinals vs. Minnesota State (2–1, 1–2, 0–1)	Did not qualify
2009–10	Jeff Giesen	15	14	8	WCHA	11	11	6	3rd WCHA	Lost Quarterfinals vs. Bemidji State (3–0, 1–2, 1–4)	Did not qualify
2010–11	Jeff Giesen	1	33	1	WCHA	1	26	1	8th WCHA	Lost Quarterfinals vs. Wisconsin (3–9, 1–5)	Did not qualify
2011–12	Jeff Giesen	5	29	2	WCHA	4	24	0	7th WCHA	Lost Quarterfinals vs. Minnesota (1–6, 0–6)	Did not qualify
2012–13	Jeff Giesen	9	24	3	WCHA	5	21	2	7th WCHA	Lost Quarterfinals vs. Wisconsin (0–5, 1–4)	Did not qualify
2013–14	Jeff Giesen	4	27	5	WCHA	3	21	4	8th WCHA	Lost Quarterfinals vs. Minnesota (1–4, 1–7)	Did not qualify
2014–15	Eric Rud	8	28	1	WCHA	5	22	1	7th WCHA	Lost Quarterfinals vs. Wisconsin (1–5, 1–4)	Did not qualify
2015–16	Eric Rud	14	18	2	WCHA	10	16	2	5th WCHA	Lost Quarterfinals vs. North Dakota (1–6, 1–6)	Did not qualify
2016–17	Eric Rud	9	23	4	WCHA	7	18	3	6th WCHA	Lost Quarterfinals vs. Minnesota Duluth (1–6, 1–6)	Did not qualify
2017–18	Eric Rud	8	20	5	WCHA	6	14	4	6th WCHA	Lost Quarterfinals vs. Minnesota (1–5, 1–4)	Did not qualify
2018–19	Eric Rud	10	25	2	WCHA	5	19	0	7th WCHA	Lost Quarterfinals vs. Wisconsin (0–5, 0–8)	Did not qualify
2019–20	Steve Macdonald	6	25	4	WCHA	2	21	1	7th WCHA	Lost Quarterfinals vs. Minnesota (2–4, 3–7)	Did not qualify
2020–21	Steve Macdonald	6	12	1	WCHA	6	12	1	6th WCHA	Did not qualify	Did not qualify
2021–22	Steve Macdonald	9	23	3	WCHA	4	20	3	7th WCHA	Lost Quarterfinals vs. Ohio State (0–6, 0–3)	Did not qualify
2022–23	Brian Idalski	18	18	1	WCHA	11	16	1	5th WCHA	Lost Quarterfinals vs. Minnesota Duluth (0–1, 1–5)	Did not qualify
2023–24	Brian Idalski	17	17	2	WCHA	12	14	2	5th WCHA	Lost Quarterfinals vs. Minnesota Duluth (0–5, 0–2)	Did not qualify
2024–25	Brian Idalski	15	15	6	WCHA	10	13	5	5th WCHA	Lost Quarterfinals vs. Minnesota Duluth (2–3, 1–2)	Did not qualify

== Current roster ==
As of June 28, 2025

No.	Nat.	Player	Class	Pos	Height	DoB	Hometown	Previous team
2	(United States)	Sydney Bryant	Junior	D	5' 8" (1.73 m)	2004-10-14	Traverse City, Michigan	Belle Tire (19U AAA)
3	(United States)	Sidney Jackel	Junior	F	5' 10" (1.78 m)	2005-08-16	Ann Arbor, Michigan	Lindenwood (AHA)
4	(Canada)	Alice Sauriol	Junior	F	5' 4" (1.63 m)	2003-12-10	Sherbrooke, Quebec	Stanstead College (JWHL)
6	(United States)	Lily Erickson	Freshman	F	5' 5" (1.65 m)	2007-08-09	Roseau, Minnesota	Roseau High School (MSHSL)
7	(United States)	Payton Remick	Freshman	F	5' 7" (1.7 m)	2007-02-02	Roseau, Minnesota	Roseau High School (MSHSL)
8	(United States)	Grace Wolfe (C)	Graduate	D	5' 9" (1.75 m)	2003-03-05	Owatonna, Minnesota	Owatonna High School (MSHSL)
9	(Germany)	Svenja Voigt	Senior	F	5' 5" (1.65 m)	2004-03-29	Cologne, Germany	Stanstead College (JWHL)
10	(United States)	Aruba Skiston	Freshman	D	5' 5" (1.65 m)	2007-05-10	Bensenville, Illinois	Chicago Mission (19U AAA)
11	(Switzerland)	Laura Zimmermann	Junior (RS)	F	5' 4" (1.63 m)	2003-04-05	Ringgenberg, Switzerland	EV Bomo Thun (SWHL A)
12	(Finland)	Raili Mustonen	Freshman	F	5' 6" (1.68 m)	2004-03-24	Kalajoki, Finland	Team Kuortane (Auroraliiga)
13	(United States)	Reese Strauts	Freshman	F	5' 8" (1.73 m)	2007-06-21	Oak Lawn, Illinois	Windy City Storm (19U AAA)
14	(Canada)	Maélie Pion	Freshman	D	5' 11" (1.8 m)	2006-04-20	Sherbrooke, Quebec	Stanstead College
15	(United States)	Marie Moran	Junior	F	5' 8" (1.73 m)	2004-12-03	Lakeville, Minnesota	Apple Valley High School (MSHSL)
16	(United States)	Avery Farrell	Senior	F	5' 4" (1.63 m)	2003-08-04	Rogers, Minnesota	Franklin Pierce University (NEWHA)
17	(Canada)	Julianne Labbé	Freshman	F	5' 8" (1.73 m)	2005-03-18	Wendake, Quebec	Cégep Limoilou Titans (QCHL)
18	(United States)	Payton Holloway	Junior	F	5' 8" (1.73 m)	2004-04-29	Tomah, Wisconsin	Minnesota Duluth (WCHA)
19	(United States)	Myah Krueger	Freshman (RS)	F	5' 7" (1.7 m)	2005-10-28	Stillwater, Minnesota	Minnesota Ice Cougars (19U AAA)
23	(Canada)	Hannah Arnold	Freshman	D	5' 8" (1.73 m)	2007-06-18	Winnipeg, Manitoba	St. Mary's Academy
28	(United States)	Sydney Lamb	Freshman	D	5' 7" (1.7 m)	2007-06-09	Lombard, Illinois	Windy City Storm (19U AAA)
29	(United States)	Jojo Chobak	Graduate	G	5' 8" (1.73 m)	2001-04-21	Chicago, Illinois	Minnesota Duluth (WCHA)
31	(Canada)	Paige Hoogendam	Sophomore	G	5' 8" (1.73 m)	2005-11-27	Ajax, Ontario	Toronto Jr. Aeros (OWHL)
34	(Finland)	Sofianna Sundelin	Sophomore	F	5' 7" (1.7 m)	2003-01-13	Ulvila, Finland	Team Kuortane (Auroraliiga)
41	(Finland)	Siiri Yrjölä	Sophomore	D	5' 8" (1.73 m)	2004-09-08	Vantaa, Finland	IFK Helsinki (Auroraliiga)
42	(Finland)	Emilia Kyrkkö	Sophomore	G	5' 7" (1.7 m)	2004-02-24	Nokia, Finland	Team Kuortane (Auroraliiga)
44	(Russia)	Maria Mikaelyan	Freshman	F	5' 8" (1.73 m)	2006-07-19	Moscow, Russia	North York Storm
45	(Canada)	Regan Bulger	Junior	D	5' 6" (1.68 m)	2004-07-13	Yellowknife, Northwest Territories	Shattuck-Saint Mary's (MSHSL)
56	(Canada)	Hali Lawrence	Senior	G	5' 7" (1.7 m)	2004-03-10	Calgary, Alberta	Post (NEWHA)

Coaching staff

- Head coach: Mira Jalosuo
- Associate head coach: Jinelle Zaugg-Siergiej
- Assistant coach: Noora Räty
- Assistant coach: Emily Ach

== Awards and honors ==
=== NCAA Division I ===
==== Patty Kazmaier Award ====
The Patty Kazmaier Memorial Award is awarded annually to the national player of the year in NCAA Division I women's ice hockey.

Top-10 finalists

- 2009–10: Felicia Nelson

Nominees

- 2009–10: Caitlin Hogan

==== All-Americans ====
All-American selections are made by the American Hockey Coaches Association (AHCA).

Second Team

2009–10: Felicia Nelson (F)

==== National Players of the Month ====
National Player of the Month honors are awarded by the Hockey Commissioners Association (HCA).

Goaltender

- October 2023: Sanni Ahola
- December 2023: Sanni Ahola

=== WCHA ===
==== Player of the Year ====
2009–10: Felicia Nelson (co-winner with Zuzana Tomčíková of Bemidji State)

==== Student-Athlete of the Year ====
2009–10: Caitlin Hogan

==== Goaltender of the Year ====
The WCHA Goaltender of the Year has been awarded since the 2017–18 season. It should not be confused with the Goaltending Champion, which is awarded to the goaltender with the best goals against average (GAA) in WCHA play (only in-conference statistics are included) and has been awarded since the 1999–2000 season.

2021–22: Emma Polusny
2023–24: Sanni Ahola

==== Coach of the Year ====
2000–01: Kerry Wethington (co-winner with Laura Halldorson of Minnesota)
2022–23: Brian Idalski (co-winner with Nadine Muzerall of Ohio State)

==== All-WCHA ====
First Team

2021–22: Emma Polusny (G)
2023–24: Sanni Ahola (G)

Second Team

2000–01: Ricki-Lee Doyle (F), Kobi Kawamoto (D), Fiona McLeod (D)
2001–02: Kobi Kawamoto (D)
2002–03: Kobi Kawamoto (D)
2005–06: Kristy Oonincx (F)
2009–10: Felicia Nelson (F), Holly Roberts (F)

Third Team

2005–06: Hailey Clarkson (F), Lauri St. Jacques (G)
2009–10: Caitlin Hogan (F)
2015–16: Molly Illikainen (F)
2017–18: Emma Polusny (G)
2023–24: Emma Gentry (F)

==== All-Rookie Team ====
2002–03: Kelly Stewart (D)
2006–07: Holly Roberts (F)
2011–12: Julie Friend (G)
2015–16: Julia Tylke (F)
2016–17: Janine Alder (G)
2017–18: Emma Polusny (G)
2019–20: Klára Hymlárová (F)
2020–21: Sanni Ahola (G)

==== Monthly honors ====
Forward of the Month

Defender of the Month

- November 2015: Katie Fitzgerald

Goaltender of the Month

- November 2022: Sanni Ahola
- October 2023: Sanni Ahola
- December 2023: Sanni Ahola

Rookie of the Month

- December 2019: Klára Hymlárová
- January 2020: Olivia Cvar
- October 2024: Emilia Kyrkkö

=== Statistical leaders ===
- Felicia Nelson, NCAA leader, 2009–10 season, Goals per game, 0.91

== Huskies in professional hockey ==
Player	Position	Team(s)	League(s)	Years	Championships
Hannah Bates	Defence	Connecticut Whale	PHF	2021–2023	
Katie Fitzgerald	Goaltender	Metropolitan Riveters	PHF, PWHPA	2016–2020	1 (2018)
Klára Hymlárová	Forward	Minnesota Frost	PWHL	2024–2025	1 (2025)
Linnea Melotindos	Forward	Ilves	Naisten Liiga	2022–present	
Jenniina Nylund	Centre	Brynäs IF	SDHL	2023–present	
Meaghan Pezon	Forward	Minnesota Whitecaps	PHF	2018–2023	1 (2019)
Emma Polusny	Goaltender	Leksands IF	SDHL	2022–present	
Kelsey Russell	Forward	Linköping HC	SDHL	2022–present	

== See also ==
- St. Cloud State Huskies
- St. Cloud State University
- St. Cloud State Huskies men's ice hockey
