= 2009–10 WCHA women's ice hockey season =

2009–10 Western Collegiate Hockey Association women's ice hockey season
- League: NCAA Division I
- Sport: Ice hockey
- Duration: September 2009 - March 2010
- Teams: 8

Tournament
- Champion: Minnesota Duluth
- Runners-Up: Minnesota

Ice hockey seasons
- 08–09 10–11

The 2009–10 Western Collegiate Hockey Association women's ice hockey season marked the continuation of the annual tradition of competitive ice hockey among Western Collegiate Hockey Association members.

== Preseason ==
According to a poll of league coaches, Wisconsin was the preseason pick to win the WCHA title. Defending WCHA champion Minnesota placed second in the poll; Minnesota Duluth placed third. All three of the teams qualified for the NCAA Frozen Four in the previous season.

Brooke Ammerman and Brianna Decker of Wisconsin were voted Preseason Player of the Year and Preseason Rookie of the Year, respectively.

== Exhibition games ==
=== Exhibition games against Canadian teams ===
Three games were played against Canadian Interuniversity Sport teams.

Date	Location	NCAA team	CIS team	Score
September 25	Grand Forks, ND	North Dakota	Manitoba	ND, 3-1
September 26	Columbus, OH	Ohio State	Wilfrid Laurier	1–1, Ohio State scores in shootout
September 26	Grand Forks, ND	North Dakota	Manitoba	Man, 3-2

=== US Olympic exhibition games ===
Throughout the season, various NCAA schools played against the United States Olympic Hockey team.

Date	Location	NCAA team	Score
September 25	Xcel Energy Center	WCHA All-Stars	6–1, USA
September 26	National Hockey Center	St. Cloud State	13–0, USA
January 5	Madison, WI	Wisconsin	9–0, USA
January 12	Ridder Arena	Minnesota	8–5, USA

== WCHA All-Star Team ==
The head coach of the WCHA All-Stars was Jeff Giesen of St. Cloud State, with Maria Lewis of North Dakota and Heather Farrell of Bemidji State serving as assistant coaches. The Athletic Trainer was Stef Arndt of St. Cloud State.

WCHA All-Star Team
Position	Name	Class	School
G	Alyssa Grogan	So.	Minnesota
G	Ashley Nixon	Jr.	St. Cloud State
G	Zuzana Tomcikova	So.	Bemidji State
D	Brittany Haverstock	So.	Wisconsin
D	Danielle Hirsch	Sr.	St. Cloud State
D	Kelly Lewis	Jr.	North Dakota
D	Jaime Rasmussen	Sr.	Minnesota Duluth
D	Shannon Reilly	Jr.	Ohio State
D	Anne Schleper	So.	Minnesota
D	Holly Snyder	Sr.	Minnesota State
F	Brooke Ammerman	So.	Wisconsin
F	Emmanuelle Blais	Sr.	Minnesota Duluth
F	Mallory Deluce	Jr.	Wisconsin
F	Laura Fridfinnson	Jr.	Minnesota Duluth
F	Jasmine Giles	Sr.	Wisconsin
F	Caitlin Hogan	Sr.	St. Cloud State
F	Christina Lee	Sr.	Minnesota State
F	Laura McIntosh	So.	Ohio State
F	Holly Roberts	Sr.	St. Cloud State
F	Natalie Spooner	So.	Ohio State
F	Emily West	Jr.	Minnesota
F	Alyssa Wiebe	So.	North Dakota
Note: G = goaltender, D = defense, F = forward So. = Sophomore, Jr. = Junior, Sr. = Senior

== Regular season ==
=== Standings ===
2009–10 Western Collegiate Hockey Association standings
	Conference								Overall					
	GP	W	L	T	SOW	PTS	GF	GA	GP	W	L	T	GF	GA
Minnesota Duluth†*	28	20	6	2	1	43	90	55	41	31	8	2	138	83
Minnesota†	28	18	6	4	3	43	91	49	40	26	9	5	129	74
St. Cloud State	28	11	11	6	4	32	70	77	37	15	14	8	96	103
Wisconsin	28	15	12	1	0	31	84	63	36	18	15	3	107	82
Ohio State	28	12	13	3	1	28	90	94	37	17	15	5	122	117
Bemidji State	28	9	12	7	3	28	47	64	38	12	19	7	65	98
Minnesota State	28	5	18	5	3	18	49	92	34	7	22	5	66	117
North Dakota	28	7	19	2	0	16	44	71	34	8	22	4	61	92
Championship: † indicates conference regular season champion; * indicates conference tournament champion Updated July 21, 2024

== In season honors ==
=== Players of the week ===
Throughout the conference regular season, WCHA officials name a player of the week each Monday.

Week	Player of the week
10/05/09	Chelsey Jones, Minnesota
10/12/09	Sarah Erickson, Minnesota
10/19/09	Emmi Leinonen, Minnesota State
10/26/09	Emmanuelle Blais, Minnesota Duluth
11/02/09	Meaghan Pezon, St. Cloud State
11/09/09	Raelyn LaRocque, Ohio State
11/16/09	Holly Roberts, St. Cloud State
11/23/09	
11/30/09	
12/7/09	
12/14/09	
12/21/09	
12/28/09	
1/4/10	Felicia Nelson, St. Cloud State
1/11/10	Sarah Erickson, Minnesota
1/18/10	Natalie Spooner, Ohio State
1/25/10	Carolyne Prevost, Wisconsin
2/1/10	
2/8/10	
2/15/10	Holly Roberts, St. Cloud State
2/22/10	
3/1/10	
3/8/10	

=== Defensive players of the week ===
Throughout the conference regular season, WCHA officials name a Defensive player of the week each Monday.

Week	Player of the week
10/05/09	Jorid Dagfinrud, North Dakota
10/12/09	Zuzana Tomcikova, Bemidji State
10/19/09	Noora Räty, Minnesota
10/26/09	Jaime Rasmussen, Minnesota Duluth
11/02/09	Becca Ruegsegger, Wisconsin
11/09/09	Zuzana Tomcikova, Bemidji State
11/16/09	Anne Schleper, Minnesota
12/07/09	Noora Räty, Minnesota and Jennifer Harss, Minnesota Duluth
01/04/10	Chelsea Knapp, Ohio State
01/11/10	Becca Ruegsegger, Wisconsin
01/18/10	Zuzana Tomcikova, Bemidji State and Ashley Nixon, St. Cloud State
01/25/10	Noora Raty, Minnesota
02/17/10	Alli Altmann, MSU-Mankato

=== Rookie of the week ===
Throughout the conference regular season, WCHA officials name a Freshman player of the week each Monday.

Week	Player of the week
10/05/09	Brianna Decker, Wisconsin
10/12/09	Katherine Wilson, Minnesota Duluth
10/19/09	Minttu Tuominen, Ohio State
10/26/09	Noora Räty, Minnesota
11/02/09	Hokey Langan, Ohio State
11/09/09	Audrey Cournoyer, Minnesota Duluth
11/16/09	Mariia Posa, Minnesota Duluth
11/23/09	Megan Bozek, Minnesota
11/30/09	
12/07/09	
12/14/09	Megan Bozek, Minnesota
01/04/10	Mary Loken, North Dakota
01/11/10	Erika Wheelhouse, Bemidji State
01/18/10	Jessica Wong, Minnesota Duluth
01/25/10	Hokey Langan, Ohio State
02/15/10	Hokey Langan, Ohio State

== Postseason ==
=== WCHA tournament ===
==== Quarterfinals ====
Date	Teams	Score	Notes
February 26	Ohio State at Wisconsin	OSU, 3-1	Natalie Spooner gets a hat trick
February 27	Ohio State at Wisconsin	OSU, 4-3 (OT)	

Date	Location	Opponent	Score
February 26	Ridder Arena	Minnesota vs. MSU Mankato	5-8
February 27	Ridder Arena	Minnesota vs. MSU Mankato	3-4 (3 OT)

- February 27: After 3 hours and 47 minutes, Emily West scored at 1:16 of triple overtime to eliminate the MSU-Mankato Mavericks.

Date	Opponent	Location	Score	Notes
Feb. 26	St. Cloud State	St. Cloud	0-3	
Feb. 27	St. Cloud State	St. Cloud	2-1	End 14 game playoff losing streak
Feb. 28	St. Cloud State		4-1	Advance to first ever WCHA Final Face-Off

- February 27: Bemidji State ends its 14 game playoff losing streak in a 2-1 victory over St. Cloud State.

Date	Location	Opponent	Score	Notes
Feb. 26	Heritage Center	North Dakota	6-2	Emmanuelle Blais scores 4 goals
Feb. 27	Heritage Center	North Dakota	3-1	Sweep series

==== Semifinals ====
Date	Location	Opponent	Score	Notes
	Ridder Arena	Minnesota vs. Ohio State		

Date	Location	Opponent	Score	Notes
	Ridder Arena	Minnesota Duluth vs. Bemidji State		

==== Finals ====
- March 7: The Minnesota Duluth Bulldogs defeated the Minnesota Golden Gophers 3-2 at Ridder Arena in Minneapolis to win the WCHA FINAL FACE-OFF playoff championship. It is the Bulldogs fifth WCHA playoff championship. This was their first postseason victory over the Golden Gophers since 2003. In addition, the Bulldogs lost three previous league playoff games against the Gophers at Ridder Arena.

Date	Location	Opponent	Score	Notes
March 7	Ridder Arena	Minnesota vs. Minnesota Duluth	Minn Duluth, 3-2	Bulldogs fifth championship

=== NCAA tournament ===
- March 8: Two teams from the WCHA will compete for the 10th NCAA Women's Ice Hockey Championship. The University of Minnesota will be the host school for the 2010 Frozen Four, to be held March 19 and 21 at Ridder Arena in Minneapolis. WCHA tournament champion University of Minnesota Duluth, and at-large selection Minnesota will be two of eight competing teams.

Minnesota Duluth (28-8-2) is seeded Number 2 and the Bulldogs will host the New Hampshire Wildcats (19-8-5) on Saturday, March 13 at 2:00 pm central standard time. The Golden Gophers (25-8-5) are the number 3 seed, and will host the Clarkson Golden Eagles (23-11-5), on March 13 at 4:00 pm central standard time. Minnesota Duluth won the Frozen Four for the first three years that the tournament was held (2001, 2002 and 2003). The Golden Gophers proceeded to win the next two Frozen Four tournaments (2004 and 2005). Neither team has won since.

Record	Win %	R32	S16	E8	F4	CG
0–0						

== WCHA awards and honors ==
Honor	Selection
Player of the Year	(Tie) Felicia Nelson, St. Cloud State and Zuzana Tomcikova, Bemidji State
Coach of the Year	Steve Sertich, Bemidji State
Freshman of the Year	Hokey Langan, Ohio State
Student Athlete of the Year	Caitlin Hogan, St. Cloud State
Defensive Player of the Year,	Anne Schleper, Minnesota
Scoring Champion	Hokey Langan, Ohio State
Goaltending Champion	Noora Raty, Minnesota
WCHA First Team	Natalie Spooner, F, Ohio State
WCHA First Team	Emmanuelle Blais, F, Minnesota Duluth
WCHA First Team	Emily West, F, Minnesota
WCHA First Team	Anne Schleper, D, Minnesota
WCHA First Team	Jaime Rasmussen, D, Minnesota Duluth
WCHA First Team	Noora Raty, G, Minnesota
WCHA Second Team	Felicia Nelson, F, St. Cloud State
WCHA Second Team	Hokey Langan, F, Ohio State
WCHA Second Team	Holly Roberts, F, St. Cloud State
WCHA Second Team	Laura Fridfinnson, F, Minnesota Duluth
WCHA Second Team	Megan Bozek, D, Minnesota
WCHA Second Team	Rachel Davis, D, Ohio State
WCHA Second Team	Zuzana Tomcikova, G, Bemidji State
WCHA Third Team	Brooke Ammerman, F, Wisconsin
WCHA Third Team	Caitlin Hogan, F, St. Cloud State
WCHA Third Team	Montana Vicharek, D, Bemidji State
WCHA Third Team	Stefanie McKeough, D, Wisconsin
WCHA Third Team	Jennifer Harss, G, Minnesota Duluth
All-Freshman Team	Hokey Langan, F, Ohio State
All-Freshman Team	Katherine Wilson, F, Minnesota Duluth
All-Freshman Team	Brianne Decker, F, Wisconsin
All-Freshman Team	Megan Bozek, D, Minnesota
All-Freshman Team	Stefanie McKeough, D, Wisconsin
All-Freshman Team	Noora Raty, G, Minnesota

== National awards and honors ==
=== Patty Kazmaier Award nominees ===
Of the 45 nominees for the Patty Kazmaier Award, ten were from the WCHA.

Player	Position	Class	School	Nationality
Emmanuelle Blais	Forward	Senior	Univ. of Minnesota Duluth	Canada
Laura Fridfinnson	Forward	Junior	Univ. of Minnesota Duluth	Canada
Caitlin Hogan	Forward	Senior	St. Cloud State Univ.	United States
Hokey Langan	Forward	Freshman	Ohio State	Canada
Felicia Nelson	Forward	Senior	St. Cloud State Univ.	Canada
Noora Räty	Goalie	Freshman	Minnesota	Finland
Anne Schleper	Defense	Sophomore	Minnesota	United States
Natalie Spooner	Forward	Sophomore	Ohio State	Canada
Zuzana Tomcikova	Goaltender	Sophomore	Bemidji State Univ.	Slovenia
Emily West	Forward	Junior	Minnesota	United States

== 2010 Olympics ==
=== Active players ===
Ten active WCHA players represented their respective countries in ice hockey at the 2010 Winter Olympics.

Player	NCAA team	Nationality	Position	Medal	Refs
Elin Holmlöv	Minnesota Duluth	Sweden	Forward	4th Place	
Haley Irwin	Minnesota Duluth	Canada	Forward	Gold	
Jocelyne Lamoureux	North Dakota	United States	Forward	Silver	
Monique Lamoureux	North Dakota	United States	Forward	Silver	
Heidi Pelttari	Minnesota State	Finland	Forward	Bronze	
Mariia Posa	Minnesota State	Finland	Forward	Bronze	
Noora Raty	Minnesota	Finland	Goaltender	Bronze	
Nina Tikkinen	Minnesota State	Finland	Forward	Bronze	
Zuzana Tomčíková	Bemidji State	Slovakia	Goaltender	8th place	
Saara Tuominen	Minnesota Duluth	Finland	Forward	Bronze	

=== Former players ===
The following former NCAA players will represent their respective countries in Ice hockey at the 2010 Winter Olympics.

Player	NCAA team	Nationality	Position	Medal	Refs
Natalie Darwitz	Minnesota	United States	Forward	Silver	
Meghan Duggan	Wisconsin	United States	Forward	Silver	
Molly Engstrom	Wisconsin	United States	Defence	Silver	
Hilary Knight	Wisconsin	United States	Forward	Silver	
Gigi Marvin	Minnesota	United States	Forward	Silver	
Meghan Mikkelson	Wisconsin	Canada	Forward	Gold	
Caroline Ouellette	Minnesota Duluth	Canada	Forward	Gold	
Jessie Vetter	Wisconsin	United States	Goaltender	Silver	
Jinelle Zaugg	Wisconsin	United States	Forward	Silver	

== See also ==
- National Collegiate Women's Ice Hockey Championship
- 2009–10 College Hockey America women's ice hockey season
- 2009–10 Eastern College Athletic Conference women's ice hockey season
- 2009–10 NCAA Division I women's ice hockey season
- Western Collegiate Hockey Association women's champions
