= 2010–11 Minnesota State–Mankato Mavericks women's ice hockey season =

American college ice hockey team season

The MSU Mankato women’s ice hockey program attempted to qualify for the NCAA Tournament for the first time in school history. Ultimately failing, winning only seven games.

== Recruiting ==
- May 7, 2010: Head coach Eric Means announced that the Mavericks have recruited ten players.

Player	Position	Nationality	Notes
Melissa Klippenstein	Forward	Canada	She skated for the Pembina Valley Hawks last season and scored 96 points. She was a member of the Manitoba Provincial Champions and Manitoba Female Midget Hockey League Champions.
Danielle Butters	Goaltender	Canada	She played for the Bluewater Hawks in the PWHL and posted a 1.79 GAA and .932 save percentage. She was a silver Medalist at Canadian National U-18 Championships.
Darion Fontaine-Bruyere	Forward	Canada	She played for Pursuit of Excellence out of Kelowna, B.C., in 2009, she was a member of the Aboriginal Canadian National Champions.
Elisabeth Hewett	Defenseman	Canada	She was a Captain for APHA Rangers Midget Female AA (and a captain for St. Mary’s Academy High School), in 2008-09 she was a member of Manitoba Provincial finalists
Tracy McCann	Forward	United States	She was a member of Ohio Flames, which qualified for the USA Girls U-19 Nationals, she was also a participant in USA Hockey Select 17 Festival
Nicole Germaine	Forward	Canada	She was a member of Shattuck-St. Marys U-19 Girls Team, she won the Girls U-19 national championship in 2008-09.
Kathleen Rogan	Forward	Canada	She was a member of Shattuck St. Mary’s Girls Prep Team and was an assistant captain in 2009-10
Danielle Scholzen	Defenseman	United States	She was a member of the Elite League championship team Minnesota Red and a participant in the Minnesota Junior Festival
Kelsie Scott	Forward	Canada	She was a member of Westman Wildcats and a member of 2009 Team Manitoba All-Star Team
Kari Lundberg	Forward	United States	She was a member of Minnesota Thoroughbreds, which were the Ohio Flames Tournament Champions, she was also a member of 2008 Two Nations Female Hockey Champions

== Regular season ==
- Kathleen Rogan registered a hat trick as the Mavericks defeated No. 6-ranked North Dakota by a 4-2 margin. This was the Mavericks first hat trick since Ashley Young registered one against Bemidji State in 2008.
- Nov. 5-6: Nina Tikkinen accumulated five points as the Mavericks won back-to-back conference games against St. Cloud State. Tikkinen had three points on November 5. The three points were all assists on Minnesota State’s first three scores, including teammate Kathleen Rogan’s game-winning goal in the first period. The following day, Tikkinen gave the Mavericks a 2-0 lead midway through the second period. The two victories gave MSU their first home ice series sweep since Oct. 31-Nov. 1, 2008 when they beat Bemidji State.
- November 12–13: Nina Tikkinen produced a four-goal, five-point series as the Mavericks won twice on the road against league rival Ohio State. For her efforts, she was named WCHA Player of the Week for the second straight time. Tikkinen had two goals and one assist for three points as MSU won by a 5-3 tally on November 12. Both of her goals tied the game (2-2 in the second period, 3-3 in the third). On November 13, she broke a 3-3 tie with a game-winning goal with only 3:45 left. Tikkinen now has a four-game winning streak. It also marked her second straight five-point weekend.
- November 12–13: Minnesota State University forward Kathleen Rogan had a goal and three assists for four points as the visiting Mavericks took back-to-back league victories from Ohio State. She had two points in each game. She earned an assist on the game-tying goal on November 12. She would register two assists on November 13 and finish the series with a +3 plus/minus rating. After the series, she became the Mavericks leading scorer with fourteen points (seven goals and seven assists).

=== Standings ===
2010–11 Western Collegiate Hockey Association standings
	Conference								Overall					
	GP	W	L	T	SW	PTS	GF	GA	GP	W	L	T	GF	GA
#1 Wisconsin†*	28	24	2	2	2	76	140	50	38	34	2	2	203	66
#3 Minnesota	28	18	8	2	1	57	100	52	37	26	9	2	131	65
#6 Minnesota Duluth	28	18	7	3	0	57	109	49	33	22	8	3	131	53
#8 North Dakota	28	16	10	2	0	50	96	79	36	20	13	3	116	103
Bemidji State	28	11	13	4	2	39	53	71	35	14	17	4	70	88
Ohio State	28	8	17	3	3	30	69	100	36	14	19	3	99	116
Minnesota State	28	7	20	1	0	22	47	101	36	8	25	3	53	122
St. Cloud State	28	1	26	1	1	5	23	135	35	1	33	1	31	177
Championship: Wisconsin † indicates conference regular season champion * indicates conference tournament champion Current rankings: USCHO.com Division I women's poll

=== Schedule ===
Date	Location	Opponent	Time	Score	Goal scorers	Record	Conf Record
10/8/2010	Niagara	Mankato, Minn.	7:07 pm	W 3-2	Moira O’Connor (2), Lauren Smith	1-0-0	0-0-0
10/9/2010	Niagara	Mankato, Minn.	3:07 pm	T 0-0	None	1-0-1	0-0-0
10/16/2010	Minnesota Duluth	Duluth, Minn.	3:07 p.m.	2-5	Emmi Leinonen, Kathleen Rogan	1-1-1	0-1-0
10/17/2010	Minnesota Duluth	Duluth, Minn.	3:07 p.m.	0-6	None	1-2-1	0-2-0
10/22/2010	North Dakota	Mankato, Minn.	7:07 p.m.	4-2	Kathleen Rogan (3), Tracy McCann	2-2-1	1-2-0
10/23/2010	North Dakota	Mankato, Minn.	3:07 p.m.				
10/29/2010	Wisconsin	Madison, Wis.	2:07 p.m.				
10/30/2010	Wisconsin	Madison, Wis.	2:07 p.m.				
11/5/2010	St. Cloud State	Mankato, Minn.	7:07 p.m.				
11/6/2010	St. Cloud State	Mankato, Minn.	3:07 p.m.				
12/2010	Ohio State	Columbus, Ohio	7:07 p.m.				
11/13/2010	Ohio State	Columbus, Ohio	7:07 p.m.				
11/19/2010	Minnesota	Mankato, Minn.	7:07 p.m.				
11/20/2010	Minnesota	Mankato, Minn.	3:07 p.m.				
11/26/2010	Wayne State (Mich.)	Wayne, Mich.	7:00 p.m.				
11/27/2010	Wayne State (Mich.)	Wayne, Mich.	2:00 p.m.				
12/3/2010	Robert Morris	Mankato, Minn.	7:07 p.m.				
12/4/2010	Robert Morris	Mankato, Minn.	3:07 p.m.				
10/2010	Bemidji State	Mankato, Minn.	7:07 p.m.				
11/2010	Bemidji State	Mankato, Minn.	3:07 p.m.				
1/7/2011	Minnesota	Minneapolis, Minn.	7:07 p.m.				
1/8/2011	Minnesota	Minneapolis, Minn.	4:07 p.m.				
1/14/2011	Ohio State	Mankato, Minn.	7:07 p.m.				
1/15/2011	Ohio State	Mankato, Minn.	3:07 p.m.				
1/21/2011	Bemidji State	Bemidji, Minn.	2:07 p.m.				
1/22/2011	Bemidji State	Bemidji, Minn.	2:07 p.m.				
1/28/2011	North Dakota	Grand Forks, N.D.	7:07 p.m.				
1/29/2011	North Dakota	Grand Forks, N.D.	7:07 p.m.				
2/4/2011	Minnesota Duluth	Mankato, Minn.	7:07 p.m.				
2/5/2011	Minnesota Duluth	Mankato, Minn.	3:07 p.m.				
11/2011	St. Cloud State	St. Cloud, Minn.	7:07 p.m.				
12/2011	St. Cloud State	St. Cloud, Minn.	2:07 p.m.				
2/18/2011	Wisconsin	Mankato, Minn.	7:07 p.m.				
2/19/2011	Wisconsin	Mankato, Minn.	3:07 p.m.				

==== Conference record ====
WCHA school	Record
Bemidji State	
Minnesota	
Minnesota Duluth	0-2-0
North Dakota	1-0-0
Ohio State	
St. Cloud State	
Wisconsin	

== Awards and honors ==
- Kathleen Rogan, WCHA Rookie of the Week (week of October 27)
- Kathleen Rogan, WCHA Rookie of the Week, (Week of November 17)
- Nina Tikkinen, WCHA Offensive Player of the Week (Week of November 10)
- Nina Tikkinen, WCHA Player of the Week, (Week of November 17)

== See also ==
- 2009–10 MSU–Mankato Mavericks women's ice hockey season
