= 2010–11 Minnesota Duluth Bulldogs women's ice hockey season =

- Conference: WCHA
- Home ice: AMSOIL Arena

Rankings
- USA Today/USA Hockey Magazine: Not ranked
- USCHO.com/CBS College Sports: 5

Record
- Overall: 22–9–3

Coaches and captains
- Head coach: Shannon Miller
- Assistant coaches: Laura Schuler; Maria Rooth; Brant Nicklin
- Captain: Jocelyne Larocque

The 2010–2011 Bulldogs attempted to win their sixth NCAA Championship in school history as defending champions.

== Offseason ==
- May 6: Maria Rooth will rejoin the Bulldog program on June 7 as an assistant coach. She is the only University of Minnesota Duluth women’s hockey player to have her jersey retired and is the Bulldogs’ all-time leading goal scorer with 119 career goals
- June 29: In March 2012, Minnesota Duluth will be the host school for the 2012 NCAA Division l Frozen Four women's tournament. The tournament will be held at the new Amsoil Arena, next to the current Duluth Entertainment Convention Center. The Bulldogs hosted the Frozen Four in both 2008 and 2003.
- September 13: The Minnesota-Duluth Bulldogs visit the White House and are honored in a Rose Garden ceremony with President Barack Obama as the 2010 NCAA National Champions.
- September 28: In the USA Today/USA Hockey Magazine Women's College Hockey Poll, the Bulldogs have been voted as the pre-season Number 1.

== Exhibition ==
Date	Opponent	Location	Time	Score	Goal scorers
10/1/2010	Minnesota Whitecaps	Duluth, MN	7:07 pm	4–3 (Shootout)	Audrey Cournoyer, Haley Irwin, Jessica Wong, Laura Fridfinnson
10/2/2010	Minnesota White Caps	Duluth, MN	7:07 pm	6–4	Katie Wilson, Haley Irwin (2), Laura Fridfinnson (2), Pernilla Winberg

== Regular season ==
- Nov. 6–7: Brienna Gillanders scored the game-winning goal and added an assist as the Bulldogs registered a 3–1 conference road victory over Bemidji State on November 6.
- December 3–4: Haley Irwin had a hand in every one of her teams’ seven goals last weekend at St. Cloud State. For her efforts, she was recognized as the WCHA Offensive Player of the Week for Dec. 7, 2010. It is her second honour of the season, having also earned the award on Nov. 24 (vs Ohio State). In both games against St. Cloud State, she had a total of three goals and four assists. On December 3, she had two assists, 12 shots on net, and was +2 in a 2–2 tie. On December 4, Irwin posted an assist on the first goal (which was also the game-winning goal) before she scored three straight goals and had a natural hat-trick. It was Irwin’s third hat trick of the season, and was followed up by an assist on UMD’s fifth goal. Irwin recorded 10 shots and was +2 in the game.

After the two game series, Irwin now leads the WCHA in scoring and ranks No. 2 in the NCAA this season with a point per game average of 2.29 (32 points: 17 goals, 15 assists in 14 games). With a goals per game average of 1.21, Irwin ranks third in the nation.

- December 3–4: Ashley Nixon amassed 86 saves and posted a .925 save percentage in the Huskies series versus ’ weekend series against defending national and WCHA champion Minnesota Duluth, has been named the WCHA Defensive Player of the Week for Dec. 7, 2010. A senior from Blaine, Minn., Nixon made 39 saves – including 19 in the second period – against the No. 3/4- ranked Bulldogs on Friday, Dec. 3 at the National Hockey Center and lifted St. Cloud State to a 1–0 shootout victory following a 2–2 overtime tie. She also helped blank UMD on all five of their power-play chances and stopped all three UMD shots in the shootout to secure the extra league point for the Huskies.

Nixon then also got the starting call against Minnesota Duluth last Saturday, coming up with 47 saves – including 24 in the second period – in a 5–0 setback. Three of the goals she surrendered in that game came on the power-play.

- January 21: The top-ranked Badgers defeated the Bulldogs on the opening night of AMSOIL arena in front of 1,639 fans. The Badgers defeated the Bulldogs 4–1, extending their 11 game-winning streak, best in the NCAA. The Bulldogs still lead the all-time series 26–21–9. A ceremonial puck drop featured Bulldog legends Jenny Potter, Caroline Ouellette and Maria Rooth. In both games, the Bulldogs wore special edition black jerseys.
- January 22: For only the second time this season, the Bulldogs found themselves in a two-goal deficit after the first period of play. Despite trailing the No. 1 University of Wisconsin by two goals in each of the three periods, the Bulldogs scored three goals in the final 11 minutes of regulation to earn a 4–4 draw with the top-ranked Badgers in AMSOIL Arena.
- Jan 28–29: Laura Fridfinnson recorded three goals as the Bulldogs swept Bemidji State. In the sweep, Fridfinnson earned a +3 plus/minus rating. She helped UMD hold the Beavers to just two power-play goals in 11 opportunities. On January 28, she scored back-to-back tallies 1:14 and 4:32 of the second period to help her club build a 3–1 advantage.
- Jocelyne Larocque became UMD’s 14th player to reach the 100 career point club during the Bulldogs 5–1 win over Ohio State on February 12, 2011. She joins current teammates Elin Holmlov, Laura Fridfinnson and Haley Irwin to form a 100-point quartet. Larocque’s assist on a power-play goal with 40 seconds remaining was her second-career game with four points. Already the all-time leading scoring defenseman in UMD history, Larocque became the first ever Bulldog blueliner to join the 100 point club.

=== Standings ===
2010–11 Western Collegiate Hockey Association standings
	Conference								Overall					
	GP	W	L	T	SW	PTS	GF	GA	GP	W	L	T	GF	GA
#1 Wisconsin†*	28	24	2	2	2	76	140	50	38	34	2	2	203	66
#3 Minnesota	28	18	8	2	1	57	100	52	37	26	9	2	131	65
#6 Minnesota Duluth	28	18	7	3	0	57	109	49	33	22	8	3	131	53
#8 North Dakota	28	16	10	2	0	50	96	79	36	20	13	3	116	103
Bemidji State	28	11	13	4	2	39	53	71	35	14	17	4	70	88
Ohio State	28	8	17	3	3	30	69	100	36	14	19	3	99	116
Minnesota State	28	7	20	1	0	22	47	101	36	8	25	3	53	122
St. Cloud State	28	1	26	1	1	5	23	135	35	1	33	1	31	177
Championship: Wisconsin † indicates conference regular season champion * indicates conference tournament champion Current rankings: USCHO.com Division I women's poll

== Awards and honors ==
- Laura Fridfinnson, WCHA Defensive Player of the Week (Week of February 2, 2011)
- Brienna Gillanders, WCHA Rookie of the Week (Week of November 10)
- Haley Irwin, WCHA Offensive Player of the Week (Week of December 7, 2010)
- Jocelyne Larocque, WCHA Defensive Player of the Week (Week of February 16, 2011)
- Shannon Miller, YWCA's Woman of Distinction 2010 Award (celebrates women's leadership)
- Ahsley Nixon, WCHA Defensive Player of the Week (Week of December 7)
- Pernilla Winberg, WCHA Player of the Week (Week of February 23, 2011)

=== Postseason honors ===
- Jocelyne Larocque, WCHA Outstanding Student-Athlete of the Year
- Jocelyne Larocque, WCHA Defensive Player of the Year
- Jocelyne Larocque, All-WCHA First Team
- Jocelyne Larocque, 2011 First Team All-America selection
- Kim Martin, WCHA Goaltending champion
- Jessica Wong, All-WCHA Second Team
- Haley Irwin, All-WCHA Second Team
