= 2010–11 Bemidji State Beavers women's ice hockey season =

- Conference: WCHA
- Home ice: Bemidji Regional Events Center

Rankings
- USA Today/USA Hockey Magazine: Not ranked
- USCHO.com/CBS College Sports: Not ranked

Record
- Overall: 14–17–4
- Home: 9–5–2
- Road: 5–12–2
- Neutral: 0–0–0

Coaches and captains
- Head coach: Steve Sertich
- Assistant coaches: Heather Farrell; Shane Veenker; Casie Hanson
- Captain(s): Annie Bauerfeld, Erin Cody

The Bemidji State Beavers attempted to qualify for the NCAA Tournament for the first time in school history.

== Recruiting ==
Player	Nationality	Position	Notes
Tess Dusik	Canada	Forward	Captained the Blazers to a fourth place finish in West division of Junior Women’s Hockey League (2009–10)
Alex Ehlert	United States	Defense	Played for the Madison Capitals AAA association for nine years
Allie Duellman	United States	Defense	Played for the Roseville High School girls' team
Danielle Williams	United States	Defense	Played for the Minnesota Thoroughbreds, was captain for the 2009–10 season...

== Exhibition ==
Date	Opponent	Location	Time	Score
9/24/2010	Toronto Jr. Aeros	Bemidji, Minn.	7:07 p.m.	4–2
10/22/2010	Minnesota Whitecaps	Eveleth, Minn.	6:00 p.m.	1–3
10/23/2010	Minnesota Whitecaps	Bemidji, Minn.	4:07 p.m.	5–1

== Regular season ==
- October 16: Alana McElhinney made a career-high 56 saves. In the game, Bemidji State had its first-ever win over a No. 1-ranked team as they defeated the Mercyhurst Lakers by a 5–3 mark. In addition, this was the second women's game ever played at the new Bemidji Regional Event Center.
- October 29–30: Erin Cody had the biggest weekend of her collegiate career. She was involved in all seven of the Bemidji State’s goals, as the Beavers swept St. Cloud State. Cody had five goals and two assists, and was a factor in both game-winning goals. Cody earned the First Star of the Game honors in both games. In the first game, Cody scored a natural hat trick (a power-play, shorthanded, and even-strength goal). All three goals were scored in the first period and set a Beavers record for most goals scored by a single player in one period. In the second game, Cody had two goals and two assists.
- Jan. 15–16: Team captain Annie Bauerfield had a hand in each of the four goals the Beavers scored in losses to WCHA rival University of North Dakota.
- Jan. 22: The Beavers defeated Minnesota State 3–1 to complete the weekend sweep over the Mavericks. Bemidji State extended its unbeaten streak against MSU and allowed only one goal on the weekend. The Beavers are now 7–0–3 in the last ten meetings with the Mavericks.

=== Standings ===
2010–11 Western Collegiate Hockey Association standings
	Conference								Overall					
	GP	W	L	T	SW	PTS	GF	GA	GP	W	L	T	GF	GA
#1 Wisconsin†*	28	24	2	2	2	76	140	50	38	34	2	2	203	66
#3 Minnesota	28	18	8	2	1	57	100	52	37	26	9	2	131	65
#6 Minnesota Duluth	28	18	7	3	0	57	109	49	33	22	8	3	131	53
#8 North Dakota	28	16	10	2	0	50	96	79	36	20	13	3	116	103
Bemidji State	28	11	13	4	2	39	53	71	35	14	17	4	70	88
Ohio State	28	8	17	3	3	30	69	100	36	14	19	3	99	116
Minnesota State	28	7	20	1	0	22	47	101	36	8	25	3	53	122
St. Cloud State	28	1	26	1	1	5	23	135	35	1	33	1	31	177
Championship: Wisconsin † indicates conference regular season champion * indicates conference tournament champion Current rankings: USCHO.com Division I women's poll

=== Schedule ===
Date	Opponent	Location	Time	Score	Goal scorers	Record	Conf Record
10/1/2010	at Wayne State	Wayne, Mich.	7:00 p.m.	3–0	Sadie Lunquist, Emily Erickson, Erin Cody	1–0–0	0-0-0
10/2/2010	at Wayne State	Wayne, Mich.	2:00 p.m.	2–4	Erin Johnson, Emily Erickson	1–1–0	0-0-0
10/8/2010	at Wisconsin	Madison, Wis.	TBA	1–7		1–2–0	0–1–0
10/9/2010	at Wisconsin	Madison, Wis.	TBA	0–2	None	1–3–0	0–2–0
10/15/2010	Mercyhurst	Bemidji, Minn.	2:07 p.m.	0–4	None	1–4–0	0–2–0
10/16/2010	Mercyhurst	Bemidji, Minn.	2:07 p.m.	5–3		2–4–0	0–2–0
10/29/2010	St. Cloud State	Bemidji, Minn.	2:07 p.m.	3–2		3–4–0	1–2–0
10/30/2010	St. Cloud State	Bemidji, Minn.	2:07 p.m.	4–0		4–4–0	2–2–0
11/5/2010	Minnesota Duluth	Bemidji, Minn.	7:07 p.m.	1–0			
11/6/2010	Minnesota Duluth	Bemidji, Minn.	6:07 p.m.	1–3			
11/12/2010	North Dakota	Bemidji, Minn.	2:07 p.m.	2–1			
11/13/2010	North Dakota	Bemidji, Minn.	2:07 p.m.	1–1			
11/26/2010	at Ohio State	Columbus, Ohio	6:07 p.m.	2–2			
11/27/2010	at Ohio State	Columbus, Ohio	6:07 p.m.	1–3			
12/3/2010	Minnesota	Bemidji, Minn.	2:07 p.m.	2–0			
12/4/2010	Minnesota	Bemidji, Minn.	2:07 p.m.	2–6			
12/10/2010	at Minnesota State	Mankato, Minn.	7:07 p.m.	2–1			
12/11/2010	at Minnesota State	Mankato, Minn.	3:07 p.m.	1–1			
1/7/2011	at St. Cloud State	St. Cloud, Minn.	2:07 p.m.	3–1			
1/8/2011	at St. Cloud State	St. Cloud, Minn.	2:07 p.m.	3–1			
1/15/2011	at North Dakota	Roseau, Minn.	7:07 p.m.	2–5			
1/16/2011	at North Dakota	Grand Forks, N.D.	2:07 p.m.	2–6			
1/21/2011	Minnesota State	Bemidji, Minn.	2:07 p.m.	2–0			
1/22/2011	Minnesota State	Bemidji, Minn.	2:07 p.m.	3–1			
1/28/2011	at Minnesota Duluth	Duluth, Minn.	7:07 p.m.	3–4			
1/29/2011	at Minnesota Duluth	Duluth, Minn.	7:07 p.m.	3–5			
2/4/2011	Wisconsin	Bemidji, Minn.	6:07 p.m.	1–7			
2/5/2011	Wisconsin	Bemidji, Minn.	4:07 p.m.	2–3(OT)			
2/11/2011	at Minnesota	Minneapolis, Minn.	6:07 p.m.	1–4			
2/12/2011	at Minnesota	Minneapolis, Minn.	4:07 p.m.	0–3			
2/18/2011	Ohio State	Bemidji, Minn.	4:07 p.m.	4–1			
2/19/2011	Ohio State	Bemidji, Minn.	2:07 p.m.	1–1			

==== Conference record ====
WCHA school	Record
Minnesota	
Minnesota State	
Minnesota Duluth	
North Dakota	
Ohio State	
St. Cloud State	
Wisconsin	

== Postseason ==
- February 26: Zuzana Tomcikova picked up her 14th career shutout and sixth of the season, breaking her previous record for most shutouts in a single season.
- February 27: Versus the No. 8 ranked North Dakota Fighting Sioux, the Beavers lost the game 16 minutes into overtime at Purpur Arena. With the loss, North Dakota won the first-round of WCHA playoffs.

Date	Opponent	Score	Goal scorers	Notes
Feb. 25	North Dakota	2–3	Erin Jackson, Emily Erickson	Zuzana Tomcikova made 23 saves
Feb. 26	North Dakota	3–0	Erika Wheelhouse, Lauren Williams, Sadie Lundquist	Attendance was 635
Feb. 27	North Dakota	2–3 (OT)	Marlee Wheelhouse, Sadie Lundquist	Fighting Sioux win series

== Awards and honors ==
- Annie Bauerfeld, Beaver Pride Athletes of the Week (Week of Jan. 10–16)
- Erin Cody, WCHA Offensive Player of the Week (Week of November 3, 2010)
- Alana McElhinney, WCHA Defensive Player of the Week (Week of October 19)
- Zuzana Tomcikova, WCHA Defensive Player of the Week (Week of October 5)
- Zuzana Tomcikova, 2011 All-WCHA Second Team

== See also ==
- 2009–10 Bemidji State Beavers women's ice hockey season
