= Amanda Kessel =

American ice hockey player (born 1991)

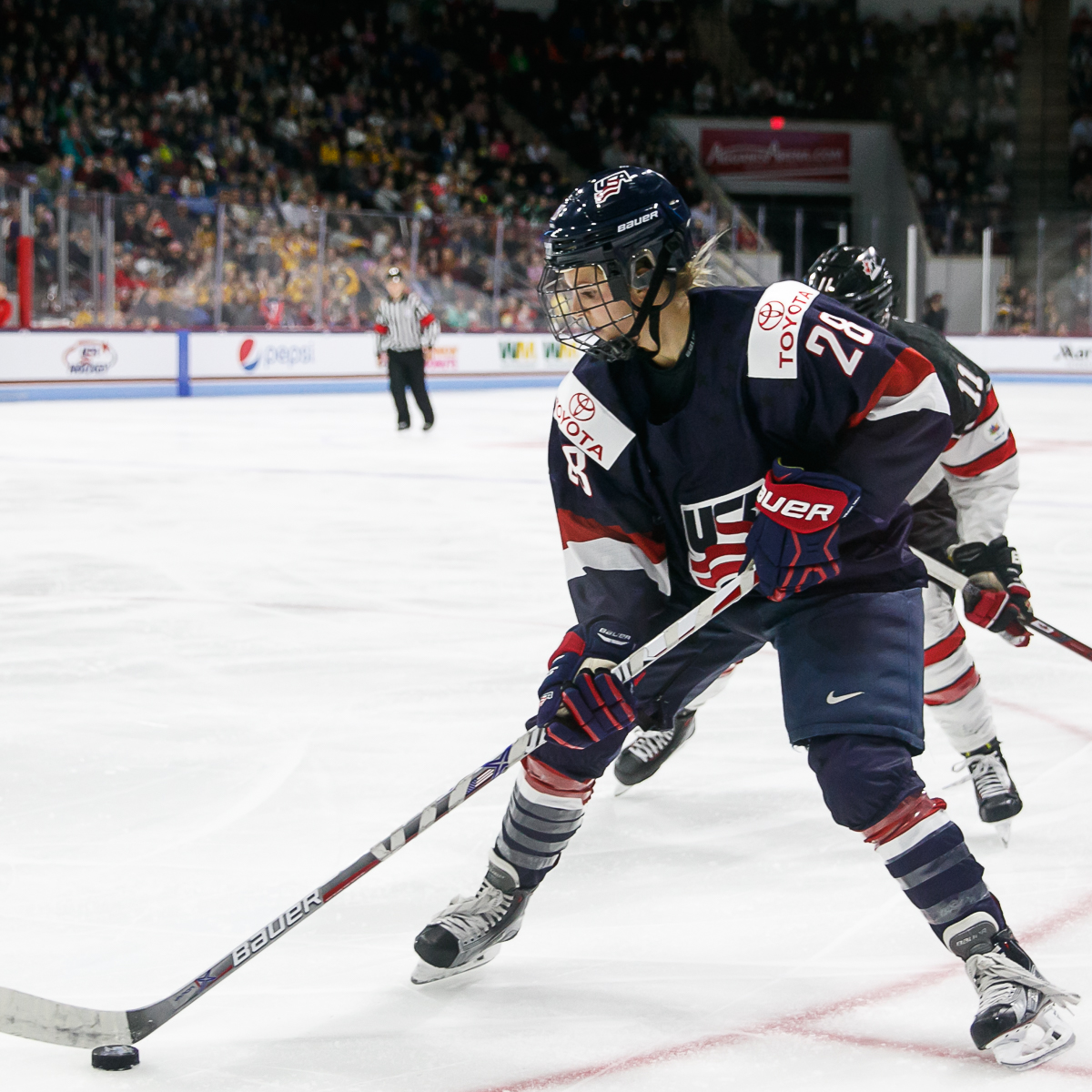
- Kessel with Team USA in 2017
- Born: August 28, 1991 (age 35) Madison, Wisconsin, U.S.
- Height: 5 ft 6 in (168 cm)
- Weight: 130 lb (59 kg; 9 st 4 lb)
- Position: Forward
- Shoots: Right
- Played for: Metropolitan Riveters
- National team: United States
- Playing career: 2010–present
Medal record
Olympic Games
Gold medal – first place	2018 Pyeongchang	Team
Silver medal – second place	2014 Sochi	Team
Silver medal – second place	2022 Beijing	Team
World Championships
Gold medal – first place	2013 Canada
Gold medal – first place	2017 United States
Gold medal – first place	2019 Finland
Gold medal – first place	2023 Canada
Silver medal – second place	2012 United States
Silver medal – second place	2021 Canada
Silver medal – second place	2022 Denmark

Amanda Kessel (born August 28, 1991) is an American ice hockey executive and professional player, currently serving as manager of minor league operations for the Pittsburgh Penguins of the National Hockey League and assistant general manager for the Wilkes-Barre/Scranton Penguins of the American Hockey League.

Kessel played college ice hockey at the University of Minnesota and professionally in the National Women's Hockey League and Professional Women's Hockey Players Association. Internationally, she represented the United States women's national ice hockey team at seven World Championships and three Olympic Games, winning five gold medals and five silver medals.

== Playing career ==
=== Youth and junior ===
Before high school, Kessel played boys' youth hockey for the Madison Capitols, winning state and regional championships in the 2005–06 season. Kessel attended high school at Shattuck-Saint Mary's, where she played for their girls' team. In 2007, she and Shattuck won the under-19 national championship, capping off a season in which Kessel had 102 points in 56 games. They repeated as national champions in her junior year, which saw her score 44 goals and 100 points in 34 games. As a senior, she led Shattuck with 122 points on the strength of 67 goals in just 46 games, doubling the next highest scorer's 61 points.

=== College ===
In her first game with the University of Minnesota, a 5–0 blanking of Clarkson University on October 1, 2010, Kessel registered two goals and two assists. The following day, Kessel scored the game-winning goal as the Gophers won by a 3–0 score.

- November 18, 2010: Kessel registered five points (including four goals) as the Golden Gophers defeated the New Hampshire Wildcats by an 11–0 tally. This was the worst loss in the 35-year history of the Wildcats program.
- November 19: Kessel earned her second hat trick of the series as the Gophers defeated New Hampshire by a 6–1 tally.
- September 10, 2014, the Golden Gophers announced that Kessel would sit out the 2014–15 season as a result of lingering concussion symptoms she had sustained while playing for Team USA.
- July 21, 2015: the Golden Gophers announced that Kessel would not be playing hockey for the 2015–16 season for health reasons. Because she had previously taken a redshirt year on two prior occasions, she will no longer be eligible to play college hockey.
- February 3, 2016: The Golden Gophers announced that Kessel returned to the team. Despite earlier prognoses, she continued working to gain clearance from doctors to play hockey and succeeded late in the 2015–2016 season in time for the February 5–6 series against North Dakota.

=== Professional ===
==== NWHL ====
Kessel was never drafted by a National Women's Hockey League team; league rules stipulate that a college player must be entering her senior year to be drafted, and Kessel's junior season was completed in 2013 before the league existed. Instead, she signed as a free agent with the New York Riveters on May 1, 2016. Her contract of $26,000 was the largest NWHL contract to date. Kessel was named one of the two captains for the 2nd NWHL All-Star Game. Scoring a hat trick in the All-Star Game, the first to do so in NWHL All-Star history, she would also be recognized as the game's Most Valuable Player. After taking a season off from the NWHL due to national team commitments, she returned to the NWHL with the renamed Metropolitan Riveters for the 2018–19 season.

==== PWHPA ====
Following the 2018–19 season, Kessel was one of many players to join the boycott on North American women's hockey leagues and join the new players' union, the Professional Women's Hockey Players Association (PWHPA), to push for better support of women's hockey. She was named a team captain at the January 2020 Toronto showcase.

Skating for Team New Hampshire during the 2020–21 PWHPA season, Kessel participated in a PWHPA Dream Gap Tour event at New York's Madison Square Garden on February 28, 2021, the first women's ice hockey event at the venue. Playing for a team sponsored by the Women's Sports Foundation, Kessel recorded a goal and an assist in a 4–3 win, earning the Second Star of the Game.

== International play ==
As a member of the U.S. Women's National Team, Kessel has won a medal at all the international tournaments she has participated in:

- Silver medalist at the 2022 Winter Olympics in Beijing, China
- Gold medalist at the 2019 IIHF Women's World Championship in Espoo, Finland
- Gold medalist at the 2018 Winter Olympics in Pyeongchang, South Korea
- Gold medalist at the 2017 IIHF Women's World Championship in Plymouth, Michigan
- Silver medalist at the 2014 Olympic Games in Sochi, Russia
- Gold medalist at the 2013 IIHF Women's World Championship in Ottawa, Ontario, Canada
- Silver medalist at the 2012 IIHF Women's World Championship in Burlington, Vermont
- Gold medalist at the 2011 and 2012 Four Nations Cup

Before being named to the U.S. Women's National Team, Kessel was a member of the United States Under-22 Team and Under-18 Team. Kessel played for the United States Under-18 in 2009 and was named the World Under-18 tournament's most valuable forward. She scored six goals and 13 assists for 19 points to lead Team USA to a gold medal. In the 2008 Under 18 World Championships, she played in five games with Team USA and tallied 11 points, ranking third among all players in scoring. Kessel was named to the US team participating in the 2010 Four Nations Cup. She did not play due to an injury.

== Administrative career ==
On April 20, 2022, the Pittsburgh Penguins of the National Hockey League (NHL) announced that Kessel would be the first member of their Executive Management Program, a one-year fellowship designed to give women and minority groups administrative expertise in preparation for a job in NHL management. She earned a promotion on August 4, 2023 when she was named as a Special Assistant to the Penguins President of Hockey Operations and General Manager, Kyle Dubas. While her previous role saw her learning multiple facets of the team's day-to-day operations, including marketing and public relations, her new role is focused solely on hockey operations and club management with a focus on research and development as well as minor league operations.

Kessel was selected by PWHL Montreal in the 2024 PWHL draft. Various outlets reported that she was only willing to play for Boston despite the league requiring prospective draftees to be willing to play for any team, prompting speculation that she might be traded. On August 19, 2024, she was promoted by the Penguins to manager of minor league operations and assistant general manager of their American Hockey League affiliate, the Wilkes-Barre/Scranton Penguins. Since the announcement, it has not been announced whether she will play for Montreal or work for the Penguins.

== Personal life ==
Kessel is the sister of three-time Stanley Cup champion Phil Kessel and former ice hockey defenseman Blake Kessel

Her father, Phil Kessel Sr., was drafted by the Washington Redskins and stayed on the injured reserve for one year.

In 2019, Kessel paired with Eric Radford for the fifth season of CBC's Battle of the Blades, where hockey players paired with figure skaters to compete for their chosen charity. However, she and Radford were the first pair eliminated.

Kessel became engaged to her partner, Catherine Williams, on August 21, 2024. The two married in 2025.

== Career statistics ==
=== Regular season and playoffs ===
			Regular season					Playoffs
Season	Team	League	GP	G	A	Pts	PIM	GP	G	A	Pts	PIM
2007–08	Shattuck-Saint Mary's	T1EHL 19U	16	13	15	28	8	—	—	—	—	—
2010–11	University of Minnesota	WCHA	35	19	30	49	20	1	0	1	1	0
2011–12	University of Minnesota	WCHA	38	29	45	74	15	3	3	3	6	2
2012–13	University of Minnesota	WCHA	43	43	49	92	25	3	3	6	9	0
2015–16	University of Minnesota	WCHA	10	6	5	11	4	3	5	1	6	0
2016–17	New York Riveters	NWHL	8	4	14	18	4	1	0	1	1	0
2018–19	Metropolitan Riveters	NWHL	13	2	15	17	6	1	0	0	0	0
2020–21	New Hampshire	PWHPA	6	3	2	5	0	—	—	—	—	—
2022–23	Team Adidas	PWHPA	6	2	3	5	0	—	—	—	—	—
NWHL totals			21	6	29	35	10	2	0	1	1	0

=== International ===
Year	Team	Event	Result	GP	G	A	Pts	PIM
2008	United States	U18	1st place, gold medalist(s)	5	4	7	11	2
2009	United States	U18	1st place, gold medalist(s)	5	6	13	19	2
2012	United States	WC	2nd place, silver medalist(s)	5	3	7	10	0
2013	United States	WC	1st place, gold medalist(s)	5	2	6	8	0
2014	United States	OG	2nd place, silver medalist(s)	5	3	3	6	0
2017	United States	WC	1st place, gold medalist(s)	5	1	5	6	0
2018	United States	OG	1st place, gold medalist(s)	5	0	1	1	0
2019	United States	WC	1st place, gold medalist(s)	7	3	2	5	0
2021	United States	WC	2nd place, silver medalist(s)	7	0	4	4	0
2022	United States	OG	2nd place, silver medalist(s)	7	3	5	8	0
2022	United States	WC	2nd place, silver medalist(s)	7	3	4	7	2
2023	United States	WC	1st place, gold medalist(s)	7	5	4	9	4
Junior totals				10	10	20	30	4
Senior totals				57	23	41	64	6

== Awards and honors ==
Award	Year	Ref
NCAA
Second Team All-American	2012	
All-Tournament Team	2012, 2016	
First Team All-American	2013	
First Team All-USCHO	2013	
USCHO Player of the Year	2013	
Patty Kazmaier Award	2013	
WCHA
Rookie of the Year	2011	
Third All-Star Team	2011	
All-Rookie Team	2011	
All-Tournament Team	2011	
Second All-Star Team	2012	
First All-Star Team	2013	
Player of the Year	2013	
NWHL
All-Star Game	2017	
International
World U18 Championship – Best Forward	2009	
Olympic Games – Media All-Star Team	2014	
World Championship – Media All-Star Team	2022	
USA Hockey
Bob Allen Women's Player of the Year Award	2013	

Awards and achievements
Preceded by Brianna Decker	Patty Kazmaier Award; 2012–13	Succeeded by Jamie Lee Rattray
