= 2010–11 Ohio State Buckeyes women's ice hockey season =

- Conference: WCHA
- Home ice: OSU Ice Arena

Rankings
- USA Today/USA Hockey Magazine: Not ranked
- USCHO.com/CBS College Sports: Not ranked

Record

Coaches and captains
- Head coach: Jackie Barto
- Assistant coaches: Josh Liegl; Alison Domenico

The Ohio State Buckeyes attempted to qualify for the NCAA Tournament for the first time in school history.

== Offseason ==
- May 19: Chelsea Knapp was included in the list of invitees to USA Hockey's Warren Strelow National Team Goaltending Camp. Four Buckeyes were among Hockey Canada's recently released list of 109 players that were invited to its National Women's Camp. The Buckeyes at the Canadian camp are: Hokey Langan, Laura McIntosh and Natalie Spooner as well as incoming goalie Lisa Steffes. The Canadian camp took place May 25–30 at the University of Calgary in Alberta (with a breakdown of 19 goalies, 33 defensemen and 57 forwards).
- June 3, 2010: Christina Mancuso was voted captain by her teammates. Juniors Laura McIntosh, Natalie Spooner and Kelly Wild were named assistant captains. It is the first time that any have been voted captains at Ohio State.
- June 18: Ohio State players Kelly Wild and Chelsea Knapp were named to the U.S. Women's Under-22 Team. It is the first time two Buckeyes earned spots on the same U.S. U-22 squad. The team will participate in both the 2010 USA Hockey Women's National Festival and the 2010 Under-22 Series. The Women's National Festival will run from August 13–21 while the Under-22 Series against Canada will be in Toronto from August 18–21.
- June 24, 2010: Former Ohio State player Rachel Davis, was invited to attend the U.S. Women's National Festival Aug. 13–21 in Lake Placid, N.Y. Davis is one of seven defenders on the 22-player roster.

=== Recruiting ===
Player	Nationality	Position	Notes
Becky Allis	United States	Defense	Played for the Chicago Mission Under-19 team
Lindsay Brown	United States	Goaltender	Played for Minnesota Thoroughbreds in 2009-10
Loren Carrier	United States	Goaltender	Attended the Ontario Hockey Academy in Cornwall
Madison Marcotte	United States	Defense	Captain of the White Bear Lake hockey team as a junior and senior in high school
Lisa Steffes	Canada	Goaltender	Invited to Canada's National Women's Under-18 Team Selection Camp; Played four seasons with the Bluewater Jr. Hawks
Annie Svedin	Sweden	Defense	Played with the Swedish National Team at the 2009 Hockey Canada Cup held in Vancouver
Ally Tarr	Canada	Forward	Invited to Canada's National Women's Under-18 Team Selection Camp in 2008 and 2009; Played four seasons with the Bluewater Jr. Hawks

== Exhibition ==
Date	Opponent	Location	Time	Score	Goal Scorers
Sat, Oct 02	Wilfrid Laurier	Columbus, Ohio	2:00 p.m.	Ohio State, 2-0	Hokey Langan, Tina Hollowell

== Regular season ==
- Lisa Steffes was in net for the sweep of Robert Morris in a non-conference road series (Oct 8–10). She allowed only one goal in each game. Steffes stopped 40 of the 42 shots on goal in both games. In addition, she faced in the series for a .952 save percentage. In addition, she also helped blank the host Colonials on all seven of their weekend power-play opportunities.
- October 16: Laura McIntosh tied the Ohio State University women's hockey record for points in a game with five. This was accomplished against WCHA rival St. Cloud State. McIntosh became just the fifth Buckeye to have five points in a game.
- October 15–16: Freshman Becky Allis had assists in each game against St. Cloud State. These were the first collegiate points of her career.
- October 29–30: Shannon Reilly contributed two assists, two blocked shots and earned a +3 plus/minus rating in the two-game sweep of the Syracuse Orange. Her two assists came on Saturday October 30 as she factored in the fourth and fifth goals to help the Buckeyes best the Orange, 6–2.
- January 14–15: Goaltender Lisa Steffes led visiting Ohio State to a pair of 3-2 league road victories at Minnesota State. She made 49 saves in OSU's first WCHA road sweep of the season. She made 28 saves on January 24 and made 21 saves the following day. Her save percentage for the two games was .925. For the season, she surpassed the 700-save milestone. She is one of only two goalies in the NCAA to already reach the 700-save mark and she also leads all NCAA Div. 1 women's goalkeepers in minutes played this season with 1454:50.
- Jan 28-29: Natalie Spooner scored four goals and contributed six points as the Buckeyes swept conference rival St. Cloud State on the road. In Ohio State's 6–1 victory on January 28, Spooner recorded her third-career hat trick as well as an assist. Her goal at 9:58 of the second period, came shorthanded and proved to be the game-winner. In the second game, Spooner had two points as the Buckeyes prevailed by a 3–2 mark. Spooner leads the Buckeyes with 14 multi-point games this season and owns a team-high 24 goals. Spooner owns the Buckeye record for career game-winning goals with 12

=== Standings ===
2010–11 Western Collegiate Hockey Association standings
	Conference								Overall					
	GP	W	L	T	SW	PTS	GF	GA	GP	W	L	T	GF	GA
#1 Wisconsin†*	28	24	2	2	2	76	140	50	38	34	2	2	203	66
#3 Minnesota	28	18	8	2	1	57	100	52	37	26	9	2	131	65
#6 Minnesota Duluth	28	18	7	3	0	57	109	49	33	22	8	3	131	53
#8 North Dakota	28	16	10	2	0	50	96	79	36	20	13	3	116	103
Bemidji State	28	11	13	4	2	39	53	71	35	14	17	4	70	88
Ohio State	28	8	17	3	3	30	69	100	36	14	19	3	99	116
Minnesota State	28	7	20	1	0	22	47	101	36	8	25	3	53	122
St. Cloud State	28	1	26	1	1	5	23	135	35	1	33	1	31	177
Championship: Wisconsin † indicates conference regular season champion * indicates conference tournament champion Current rankings: USCHO.com Division I women's poll

=== Schedule ===
Date	Opponent	Location	Time	Score	Record	Conf Record	
Fri, Oct 08	Robert Morris	at Pittsburgh, Pa.	7:00 p.m.			1-0-0	0-0-0
Sat, Oct 09	Robert Morris	at Pittsburgh, Pa.	2:00 p.m.			2-0-0	0-0-0
Fri, Oct 15	St. Cloud State *	Columbus, Ohio	7:00 p.m.				
Sat, Oct 16	St. Cloud State *	Columbus, Ohio	4:00 p.m.				
Fri, Oct 22	Wisconsin *	at Madison, Wis.	7:00 p.m.				
Sat, Oct 23	Wisconsin *	at Madison, Wis.	7:00 p.m.				
Fri, Oct 29	Syracuse	Columbus, Ohio	7:00 p.m.				
Sat, Oct 30	Syracuse	Columbus, Ohio	4:00 p.m.				
Sat, Nov 06	North Dakota *	at Grand Forks, N.D.	2:00 p.m.				
Sun, Nov 07	North Dakota *	at Grand Forks, N.D.	2:00 p.m.				
Fri, Nov 12	Minnesota State *	Columbus, Ohio	7:00 p.m.				
Sat, Nov 13	Minnesota State *	Columbus, Ohio	7:00 p.m.				
Fri, Nov 19	Minnesota Duluth *	at Duluth, Minn.	7:00 p.m.				
Sat, Nov 20	Minnesota Duluth *	at Duluth, Minn.	7:00 p.m.				
Fri, Nov 26	Bemidji State *	Columbus, Ohio	7:00 p.m.				
Sat, Nov 27	Bemidji State *	Columbus, Ohio	7:00 p.m.				
Fri, Dec 10	Minnesota *	at Minneapolis, Minn.	6:00 p.m.				
Sat, Dec 11	Minnesota *	at Minneapolis, Minn.	2:00 p.m.				
Fri, Dec 31	Wayne State	Columbus, Ohio	2:00 p.m.				
Sat, Jan 01	Wayne State	Columbus, Ohio	2:00 p.m.				
Fri, Jan 07	Wisconsin *	Columbus, Ohio	7:00 p.m.				
Sat, Jan 08	Wisconsin *	Columbus, Ohio	4:00 p.m.				
Fri, Jan 14	Minnesota State *	at Mankato, Minn.	7:00 p.m.				
Sat, Jan 15	Minnesota State *	at Mankato, Minn.	3:00 p.m.				
Fri, Jan 21	Minnesota *	Columbus, Ohio	7:00 p.m.				
Sat, Jan 22	Minnesota *	Columbus, Ohio	4:00 p.m.				
Fri, Jan 28	St. Cloud State *	at St. Cloud, Minn.	2:00 p.m.				
Sat, Jan 29	St. Cloud State *	at St. Cloud, Minn.	1:00 p.m.				
Fri, Feb 04	North Dakota *	Columbus, Ohio	7:00 p.m.				
Sat, Feb 05	North Dakota *	Columbus, Ohio	4:00 p.m.				
Fri, Feb 11	Minnesota Duluth *	Columbus, Ohio	7:00 p.m.				
Sat, Feb 12	Minnesota Duluth *	Columbus, Ohio	4:00 p.m.				
Fri, Feb 18	Bemidji State *	at Bemidji, Minn.	2:00 p.m.				
Sat, Feb 19	Bemidji State *	at Bemidji, Minn.	2:00 p.m.				

==== Conference record ====
WCHA school	Record
Bemidji State	
Minnesota	
Minnesota State	
Minnesota Duluth	
North Dakota	
St. Cloud State	
Wisconsin	

== Awards and honors ==
- Becky Allis, WCHA Rookie of the Week (Week of October 19)
- Laura McIntosh, WCHA Offensive Player of the Week (Week of October 19)
- Shannon Reilly, WCHA Defensive Player of the Week (Week of November 3, 2010)
- Natalie Spooner, WCHA Offensive Player of the Week (Week of February 2, 2011)
- Natalie Spooner, 2011 Big Ten Outstanding Sportsmanship Award
- Lisa Steffes, WCHA Rookie of the Week (Week of October 12)
- Lisa Steffes, WCHA Rookie of the Week (Week of January 19, 2011)
