= 2010–11 North Dakota Fighting Sioux women's ice hockey season =

- Conference: WCHA

Rankings
- USA Today/USA Hockey Magazine: Not ranked
- USCHO.com/CBS College Sports: 9

Record
- Overall: 20–13–3
- Road: 1–1–0

Coaches and captains
- Head coach: Brian Idalski
- Captain(s): Jocelyne Lamoureux, Monique Lamoureux, Jorid Dagfinrud
- Alternate captain(s): Sara Dagenais, Margot Miller

== Recruiting ==
Player	Nationality	Position	Notes
Madison Kolls	United States	Defense	Invitee to USA National Camps including U17 (2009), U16 (2008) and U15 (2007)
Ariel Monarez	United States	Defense	Played for the Colorado Springs Jr. Tigers
Michelle Karvinen	Finland Denmark	Forward	Competed in the 2010 Vancouver Winter Olympics with Finland; Was only European chosen for All-Star team at the 2009 World Championships
Michelle Bonapace-Potvin	Canada	Goaltender	Ms. Goalie top-five finalist in 2010

== Exhibition ==
Date	Opponent	Location	Time	Score	Goal scorers
09/25/10	Toronto Aeros	Grand Forks, N.D.	2:07 p.m. ET	9–0	Sara Dagenais, Mary Loken (2), Jocelyne Lamoureux (3), Monique Lamoureux (2)

== Regular season ==
- Oct 5: North Dakota was ranked 10th in the Uscho.com poll. It is only the second time in program history that the club was in the top 10 in either the USA Today or Uscho.com poll. The last time came during the 2008–09 season after a 7–2–1 start.
- Oct 11: In front of 1,469 fans, the Fighting Sioux defeated top-ranked Minnesota Duluth by a 4–2 mark. It marks the second time in the past two seasons that the Sioux have defeated a number one ranked team. The first time North Dakota beat a #1 team was against Wisconsin in 2009. This is also the first time that the Sioux have beaten the Bulldogs at home (and the third win against them ever). Goaltender Stephanie Ney got the win in her first start of the 2010–11 season. For her efforts, she was the WCHA Defensive Player of the Week for Oct. 13. She stopped 30 of 32 shots on goal as the Fighting Sioux were outshot 32–19. In addition, she also picked up an assist on teammate Monique Lamoureux’s power-play goal at 8:49 of the third period.
- October 16–17: Jordan Slavin had one goal and three assists as the Fighting Sioux achieved its first-ever two-game WCHA road sweep at Minnesota.
- October 22–23: Jocelyne Lamoureux had six points (4 goals and 2 assists) against Minnesota State. On the October 22 loss, Lamoureux had one goal and one assist. The following day, the Fighting Sioux triumphed by a 5–1 mark. Lamoureux had a hat trick and one assist. In addition, one of her goals was the game-winning goal. The hat trick was the first by a North Dakota player since Cami Wooster in 2005.
- Nov. 6–7: Jordan Slavin led the Sioux with a +3 plus/minus rating in a series against league rival Ohio State last weekend. Slavin was part of a defensive effort that limited the visiting Buckeyes to 17 shots on goal as the Sioux triumphed in overtime by a 3–2 mark. Slavin and the Sioux defensive corps blanked the Buckeyes on all five of their series power-play opportunities.
- November 13: Stephanie Ney stopped 35 of 36 shots on goal as the Sioux recorded a 1–1 overtime tie at Bemidji State. She made 35 saves in the conference game against the Beavers on Nov. 13. Ney remains unbeaten on the 2010–11 season with a 3–0–2 record, and sports a 1.36 goals-against average and a .946 save percentage.
- December 14, 2010: Head coach Brian Idalski announced the signings of Shelby Amsley-Benzie, Josefine Jakobsen, Leah Jensen and Layla Marvin to National Letters of Intent to play for the Fighting Sioux beginning in 2011–12.
- January 15–16: Monique Lamoureux-Kolls led the Sioux with five points in two victories over league rival Bemidji State. She earned a +7 plus/minus rating in her first weekend playing exclusively as a defenseman. In the series against Bemidji, she scored two goals and assisted on three others as North Dakota ran its unbeaten streak to five games at 4–0–1. Over 59 collegiate games, she has accumulated 107 points (54 goals, 53 assists).

=== Standings ===
2010–11 Western Collegiate Hockey Association standings
	Conference								Overall					
	GP	W	L	T	SW	PTS	GF	GA	GP	W	L	T	GF	GA
#1 Wisconsin†*	28	24	2	2	2	76	140	50	38	34	2	2	203	66
#3 Minnesota	28	18	8	2	1	57	100	52	37	26	9	2	131	65
#6 Minnesota Duluth	28	18	7	3	0	57	109	49	33	22	8	3	131	53
#8 North Dakota	28	16	10	2	0	50	96	79	36	20	13	3	116	103
Bemidji State	28	11	13	4	2	39	53	71	35	14	17	4	70	88
Ohio State	28	8	17	3	3	30	69	100	36	14	19	3	99	116
Minnesota State	28	7	20	1	0	22	47	101	36	8	25	3	53	122
St. Cloud State	28	1	26	1	1	5	23	135	35	1	33	1	31	177
Championship: Wisconsin † indicates conference regular season champion * indicates conference tournament champion Current rankings: USCHO.com Division I women's poll

=== Schedule ===
Date	Opponent	Location	Time	Score	Record	Conference Record	Goal scorers
10/02/10	vs. Boston University	Grand Forks, N.D.	2:07 p.m. ET	5–4	1–0–0	0-0-0	Margot Miller, Stephanie Roy, Jocelyne Lamoureux, Monique Lamoureux (2)
10/03/10	vs. Boston University	Grand Forks, N.D.	2:07 p.m. ET	2–6	1–1–0	0-0-0	Kelsey Ketcher, Jocelyne Lamoureux
10/08/10	Minnesota Duluth	Grand Forks, N.D.	7:07 pm ET	0–4	1–2–0	0–1–0	None
10/10/10	Minnesota Duluth	Grand Forks, N.D.	2:07 p.m. ET	4–2	2–2–0	1–1–0	Jocelyne Lamoureux, Sara Dagenais, Monique Lamoureux
10/15/10	Minnesota			4–3	3–2–0	0-0-0	
10/16/10	Minnesota			3–1	4–2–0	0-0-0	
10/22/10	Minnesota State			2–4	4–3–0	0-0-0	
10/23/10	Minnesota State			5–1	5–3–0	0-0-0	
11/06/10	Ohio State			3–2 (OT)	6–3–0	0-0-0	
11/07/10	Ohio State			2–2	6–3–1	0-0-0	
11/19/10	St. Cloud State			6–3	7–3–1	0-0-0	
11/20/10	St. Cloud State			6–1	8–3–1	0-0-0	
12/04/10	Wisconsin					0-0-0	
12/05/10	Wisconsin					0-0-0	

==== Conference record ====
WCHA school	Record
Bemidji State	2–1–1
Minnesota	2–0–0
Minnesota State	1–1–0
Minnesota Duluth	2–2–0
Ohio State	1–0–1
St. Cloud State	2–0
Wisconsin	0–2–0

== Awards and honors ==
- Jocelyne Lamoureux, WCHA co-Offensive Players of the Week (Week of October 27, 2010)
- Jocelyne Lamoureux, 2011 Patty Kazmaier Award Nominee
- Monique Lamoureux, WCHA Defensive Player of the Week (Week of January 19, 2011)
- Monique Lamoureux, 2011 Patty Kazmaier Award Nominee *Stephanie Ney, WCHA Defensive Player of the Week (Week of October 12)
- Stephanie Ney, WCHA Defensive Player of the Week, (Week of November 17)
- Stephanie Ney, WCHA Defensive Player of the Week, (Week of January 26, 2011)
- Jordan Slavin, WCHA Defensive Player of the Week (Week of October 19)
- Jordan Slavin, WCHA Defensive Player of the Week (Week of November 10)

=== Postseason honors ===
- Jocelyne Lamoureux, 2011 All-WCHA Second Team
- Monique Lamoureux, 2011 All-WCHA Second Team
