= 2010–11 Hockey East women's season =

The 2010–11 Hockey East women's ice hockey season marked the continuation of the annual tradition of competitive ice hockey among Hockey East members.

== Offseason ==
- June 2, 2010: 2010 Canadian Olympic gold medallists Catherine Ward and Marie-Philip Poulin have tentatively agreed to join the Terriers.
- August 16, 2010: Four Terriers players were named to Canada's Under 22 team. Jenelle Kohanchuk, Tara Watchorn, Jennifer Wakefield and Marie-Philip Poulin will take part in an exhibition series against the United States Under 22 team from August 18–21 in Toronto.
- September 20: Hockey East commissioner Joe Bertagna released the 2010 WHEA preseason coaches poll. The Boston University Terriers are the preseason favourites to win the league championship.
- September 28: In the USA Today/USA Hockey Magazine Women's College Hockey Poll, the Terriers have been voted as the pre-season Number 4.

== Exhibition ==
=== CIS Exhibition ===
Date	NCAA school	Opponent	Score	NCAA goal scorers
Sept. 24	Boston College	Windsor	3-0, BC	Ashley Motherwell, Danielle Doherty, Mary Restuccia
Sept. 25	Boston University	Windsor	4-1, BU	Jillian Kirchner; Jill Cardella; Britt Hergesheimer; Louise Warren
Sept. 26	Northeastern	McGill	3-2 (OT), Northeastern	Katie McSorley; Lori Antflick; Kristi Kehoe (game winner)
Oct. 2	Vermont	McGill	Tie, 2-2	Emily Walsh, Celeste Doucet

== Season standings ==
2010–11 Hockey East Association standings
	Overall							Conference					
	GP	W	L	T	PTS	GF	GA	GP	W	L	T	GF	GA
#4 Boston University†	32	28	4	4	60	117	56	21	15	3	3	66	33
#7 Boston College*	31	20	6	5	45	92	56	21	13	4	4	55	32
#9 Providence	35	22	12	1	45	53	43	21	12	8	1	53	43
Connecticut	18	7	10	1	15	35	51	21	9	9	3	36	39
Northeastern	18	10	4	4	24	48	35	21	6	10	5	42	48
Maine	19	8	7	4	19	54	42	21	6	12	3	37	54
New Hampshire	19	9	10	0	18	33	40	21	7	13	1	35	50
Vermont	33	7	17	9	23	44	77	21	4	13	4	24	49
Championship: Boston College † indicates conference regular season champion * indicates conference tournament champion Current rankings: USCHO.com Division I women's poll

*Rankings based on number of wins in the conference

== Regular season ==
=== News and notes ===
- October 2: Olympic gold medallist Marie-Philip Poulin scored a goal for Boston University in her first NCAA game.
- October 3: By defeating North Dakota by a 6-2 mark, it signified the first time in program history that the Terriers defeated an opponent from the WCHA.
- Marie-Philip Poulin led all NCAA freshmen in goals (9) and points per game (2.00) during October 2010. In addition, she led all Hockey East freshmen in goals, assists and points, and ranked during the month. She was ranked first among all Hockey East players in shorthanded goals with three. In the first seven games of her NCAA career, she had a seven-game point-scoring streak consisting of nine goals and seven assists.
- Kelli Stack finished October 2010 with fifteen points (nine goals, six assists) in eight games for Boston College. Stack started every game at center and has accumulated points in every game. She finished the month leading the Eagles in points, goals, power play goals, and shorthanded goals. On October 31, she was involved in all three goals against Connecticut (one goal, two assists). She was part of all three goals scored at Vermont on October 15 (two goals, one assist). Against the Syracuse Orange (on October 9), Stack scored a hat trick.
- The 1-0 shutout by Connecticut on November 13 ended New Hampshire’s 17-game unbeaten streak against the Huskies. The Huskies penalty kill was a perfect 6-of-6 on the weekend. The shutout on November 13 marked the first time the Wildcats were shut out at home since Nov. 28, 2004 (by Mercyhurst), a streak of 109 consecutive home games.
- November 21: Northeastern player Katie McSorley recorded her first career hat trick and added two assists as the Huskies prevailed by a 5-1 tally over the Providence Friars. The hat trick was the first hat trick for a Northeastern player since Julia Marty in 2008. It was also the first five point game by a Husky since Chelsey Jones tallied five points against Maine on Dec. 3, 2006.
- Dec . 1: Northeastern Huskies freshman Rachel Llanes scored the first and last goal of the game in Northeastern’s 4-0 win over New Hampshire with six shots on goal. It was her first-ever multi-goal game. Another freshman, Katie MacSorley scored a goal in the 4-0 win over New Hampshire. Florence Schelling made 22 saves for her third shutout of the season. With the win, Northeastern snapped a 27-game unbeaten streak (0-26-1) against New Hampshire. Their last win over New Hampshire was Jan. 21, 2001, a 2-1 win. In addition, the fact that it was a shutout victory marks the first over UNH in the history of the program.
- On January 16, the Boston University Terriers defeated Maine and set a program record with their 11th home win of the season. The previous mark was 10 wins during the 2006-07 season.
- On January 22, 2011, Marie-Philip Poulin recorded a hat trick, including two power play goals as BU prevailed over Vermont in a 4-0 win. The win was the Terriers 100th win in program history. Poulin broke BU’s single-season points record with her second goal of the game and later tied the single-season goals record with her third marker.

== Player stats ==
=== Scoring leaders ===
- (Through March 10)

Player	School	GP	G	A	P	PPG	PIM	PP	SH	GW	HT	+/-
Kelli Stack	BC	34	34	22	56	1.65	34	8	4	8	3	+27
Jenn Wakefield	BU	31	30	21	51	1.65	30	7	2	6	0	+23
Marie-Philip Poulin	BU	25	22	22	44	1.76	22	7	3	3	2	+23
Mary Restuccia	BC	35	11	27	38	1.09	56	3	0	4	0	+18
Rachel Llanes	Northeastern	37	12	19	31	0.84	12	4	1	2	0	+11

=== Goaltending Leaders ===
- (through November 1)

==== Goals against average ====
Player	School	GP	Minutes	GA	GAA	Record	SO	Saves	Save %
Lindsey Minton	UNH	6	365:38	6	0.98	5-1-0	2	128	.955
Molly Schaus	BC	8	470:00	9	1.15	6-0-2	3	159	.946
Genevieve Lacasse	PC	9	549:44	15	1.64	6-2-1	2	281	.949
Kerrin Sperry	BU	6	364:39	10	1.65	5-0-1	0	126	.926
Florence Schelling	NU	8	464:06	16	2.07	5-1-2	0	179	.918

==== Save Percentage ====
Player	School	GP	Save %
Lindsey Minton	UNH	6	.955
Genevieve Lacasse	Prov	9	.949
Molly Schaus	BC	8	.946
Roxanne Douville	UVM	4	.936
Kelci Lanthier	UVM	4	.935

==== Saves ====
Player	School	GP	Saves per game	Saves
Genevieve Lacasse	PC	9	31.2	281
Alexandra Garcia	UC	9	30.4	274
Brittany Ott	ME	6	32.5	195
Florence Schelling	NU	8	22.4	179
Molly Schaus	BC	8	19.9	159

== In season honors ==
=== Pure Hockey Player of the week ===
Throughout the conference regular season, Hockey East offices names a Pure Hockey player of the week each Monday.

Week	Player of the week
September 27	Brittany Dougherty, Maine
October 4	Jennifer Wakefield, Boston University
October 11	Kate Bacon, Providence
October 18	Marie-Philip Poulin, Boston University
October 25	Julia Marty, Northeastern
November 1	Kelli Stack, Boston College
November 8	Kathryn Miller, Boston University
November 15	Kelly Horan, Connecticut
November 22	Katie McSorley, Northeastern and Kelli Stack, Boston College
November 29	Brittany Dougherty, Maine
December 4	Erin Wente, Vermont
January 17	Jenn Wakefield, Boston University
January 24	Genevieve Lacasse, Providence.
January 31	
February 7	Danielle Welch, Boston College
February 14	Myriam Crousette, Maine
February 21	
February 28	Casey Pickett, Northeastern
March 7	Kelli Stack, Boston College

=== Defensive Players of the week ===
Week	Def. Player of the week
September 27	Brittany Ott, Maine
October 4	Kerrin Sperry, Boston University
October 11	Brittany Ott, Maine
October 18	Genevieve Lacasse, Providence
October 25	Florence Schelling, Northeastern
November 1	Genevieve Lacasse, Providence and Lindsey Minton, New Hampshire
November 8	Florence Schelling, Northeastern
November 15	Alexandra Garcia, Connecticut
November 22	Molly Schaus, Boston College
November 29	Brittany Ott, Maine
December 4	Genevive Lacasse, Providence
January 17	Alexandra Garcia, Connecticut
January 24	Alexandra Garcia, Connecticut
January 31	
February 7	Kayley Herman, New Hampshire
February 14	Genevive Lacasse, Providence
February 21	
February 28	Florence Schelling, Northeastern
March 7	Florence Schelling, Northeastern

=== Pro Ambitions Rookie of the week ===
Throughout the conference regular season, Hockey East offices names a rookie of the week each Monday.

Week	Player of the week
September 27	Jenny Kistner, Maine
October 4	Corrine Buie, Providence
October 11	Taylor Wasylk, Boston College
October 18	Taylor Wasylk, Boston College
October 25	Taylor Wasylk, Boston College
November 1	Roxanne Douville, Vermont
November 8	Roxanne Douville, Vermont
November 15	Roxanne Douville, Vermont
November 22	Kerrin Sperry, Boston University
January 17	Marie-Philip Poulin, Boston University
January 24	Marie-Philip Poulin, Boston University
January 31	
February 7	Taylor Gross, Connecticut
February 14	Stephanie Raithby, Connecticut
February 21	
February 28	Rebecca Morse, Providence
March 7	Melissa Bizzari, Boston College

=== Team of the week ===
Throughout the conference regular season, Hockey East offices names a team of the week each Monday.

Week	Team of the week
September 27	Maine
October 4	New Hampshire
October 11	Providence
October 18	Boston College
October 25	Northeastern
January 31	
February 7	Boston College Eagles
February 14	Maine Black Bears
February 21	
February 28	Northeastern Huskies
March 7	Boston College Eagles

=== Monthly Awards ===
==== Player of the Month ====
Month	Player
October	Kelli Stack, Boston College
November	Kelli Stack, Boston College
December	

==== Defensive Player of the Month ====
Month	Player
October	Genevieve Lacasse, Providence
November	Alexandra Garcia, Connecticut
December	

==== Rookie of the Month ====
Month	Player
October	Marie-Philip Poulin, Boston University
November	(Tie) Roxanne Douville, Vermont and Kerrin Sperry, Boston University
December	

=== Three Stars standings ===
At the conclusion of each Hockey East league game, the Hockey East “Three Stars of The Game” are selected. Here are the leaders for the 2010-2011 season to date.

Rk.	Player	Team	Position
1	Kelli Stack	BC	F
2	Kristina Lavoie	UNH	F
2	Molly Schaus	BC	G
4	Sarah Cuthbert	UNH	F/D
5	Kristina Brown	BC	F

== Postseason ==
- February 17: Hockey East Commissioner Joe Bertagna announced that top seed Boston University and Walter Brown Arena will play host for the 2011 WHEA Championships. The championships will be held on March 5 and 6. The Championship Game will be shown tape delayed on the New England Sports Network (NESN) at 4pm on Sunday, March 6. Boston University and Boston College will be the No. 1 and No. 2 seeds for the semifinal round with first round byes in the tournament.
- On March 5, 2011, Florence Schelling set a Hockey East tournament record with 44 saves, including a record 24 in the first period as the Huskies upset No. 1 seed Boston University by a 4-2 tally at Walter Brown Arena. Alyssa Wohlfeiler tallied two goals and Claire Santostefano potted the game-winning goal
- Kelli Stack scored the game-winning goal in overtime as Boston College defeated Providence by a 3-2 tally to advance to the Hockey East championship game. Providence goalie Genevieve Lacasse would break the record set by Florence Schelling earlier in the day for most saves in a tournament game with 58.
- On March 18, 2011, Jillian Kirchner and junior Jenelle Kohanchuk scored in a 50-second span, as the Terriers advanced to the final of the 2011 NCAA Women's Division I Ice hockey Tournament. Kirchner's goal was the game winner as the Terriers improved to 27-6-4 and became the first Hockey East school to advance to the national title game. In addition, Catherine Ward was the first ever Terrier to be named an All-American, as she was selected for the second team.

=== Hockey East awards and honors ===
- Cammi Granato Award (Hockey East Player of the Year): Kelli Stack, Boston College
- Coach of the Year: Bob Deraney, Providence
- Rookie of the Year: Marie-Philip Poulin, Boston University
- Army ROTC Three Stars Award: Kelli Stack, Boston College
- Best Defenseman Award: Catherine Ward, Boston University
- Best Defensive Forward: Holly Lorms, Boston University
- Goaltending Champion: Kerrin Sperry, Boston University
- Scoring Champion: Kelli Stack, Boston College
- Sportsmanship Award: Jean O'Neill, Providence
- Turfer Athletic Award: Northeastern University

==== WHEA First-Team All-Stars ====
- G: Molly Schaus, Boston College
- D: Courtney Birchard, New Hampshire
- D: Catherine Ward, Boston University
- F: Marie-Philip Poulin, Boston University
- F: Kelli Stack, Boston College
- F: Jenn Wakefield, Boston University

==== 2011 WHEA Second-Team All-Stars ====
- G: Alexandra Garcia, Connecticut
- D: Sami Evelyn, Connecticut
- D: Amber Yung, Providence
- F: Kate Bacon, Providence
- F: Jillian Kirchner, Boston University
- F: Mary Restuccia, Boston College

==== 2011 WHEA Honorable Mention All-Stars ====
- G: Genevieve Lacasse, Providence
- G: Kerrin Sperry, Boston University
- D: Jennifer Friedman, Providence
- D: Meagan Mangene, Boston College
- D: Tara Watchorn, Boston University
- F: Jennie Gallo, Maine
- F: Rachel Llanes, Northeastern
- F: Danielle Welch, Boston College

==== All-Rookie team ====
- G: Kerrin Sperry, Boston University
- G: Roxanne Douville, Vermont
- D: Meagan Mangene, Boston College
- D: Rebecca Morse, Providence
- F: Corinne Buie, Providence
- F: Katie MacSorley, Northeastern
- F: Marie-Philip Poulin, Boston University (unanimous selection)

=== All-Americans ===
==== First Team ====
- G: Molly Schaus, Boston College

==== Second Team ====
- Kelli Stack, Boston College
- Catherine Ward, Boston University

=== 2011 Hockey East Women's Ice Hockey Tournament ===
Semifinals; March 5
1	Boston University	2
4	Northeastern	4
2	Boston College	3
3	Providence	2

Championship Game; March 6
4	Northeastern
2	Boston College

==== 2011 Hockey East All-Tournament team ====
Player	Position	School
Blake Bolden	D	Boston College
Julia Marty	D	Northeastern
Casey Pickett	F	Northeastern
Florence Schelling	G	Northeastern
Kelli Stack	F	Boston College
Jenn Wakefield	F	Boston University

== See also ==
- National Collegiate Women's Ice Hockey Championship
- 2010–11 CHA women's ice hockey season
- 2010–11 WCHA women's ice hockey season
- 2010–11 ECAC women's ice hockey season
