= 2010–11 Boston College Eagles women's ice hockey season =

Beanpot champions Hockey East tournament champions
- Conference: HEA
- Home ice: Conte Forum

Rankings
- USCHO.com/CBS College Sports: 3

Record
- Overall: 24-7-6
- Road: 4-0-0

Coaches and captains
- Head coach: Katie King
- Captain(s): Kelli Stack, Molly Schaus

== Offseason ==
=== Recruiting ===
Player	Nationality	Position	Notes
Melissa Bizzari	United States	Forward	Attended USA Hockey U-14, U-16, U-17 Player Development Camps
Taylor Waslyk	United States	Forward	2007-2010 State Champions in Michigan; 2009 gold medalist at the U-18 World Championships with Team USA

== Exhibition ==
Date	Opponent	Score	Goal scorers
Sept. 24	Windsor	3-0	Ashley Motherwell, Danielle Doherty, Mary Restuccia

== News and notes ==
=== October ===
- Taylor Wasylk had 5 points (2 goals, 3 assists) in the BC victories on Oct. 8 and 9. She scored her first collegiate goal on Oct. 8 vs. Colgate. She had a four-point game the following day against Syracuse.
- Taylor Wasylk scored a goal and assisted on Kelli Stack’s goal as the Eagles tied Quinnipiac 3-3. Against Brown, she scored twice as the Eagles prevailed by a 5-2 mark. She fired 13 shots on goal in the two contests and earned a +6 plus/minus rating. For her efforts, she was recognized as Hockey East Rookie of the Week for the third consecutive week. Wasylk's honor marks the first time in Boston College Eagles women's ice hockey history that a player has won a league award for three consecutive weeks.
- Molly Schaus recorded her 60th win in BC’s 4-1 win over Vermont
- Of the five new freshmen on this year’s team, through October 24, three have scored goals, four have scored assists, and all five have started.
- The last time BC went 4-0 to start a season was in the 2007-08 season. Had BC won against Quinnipiac on Friday Oct. 22, it would have been the first time in program history that the team opened the season at 5-0.
- October 24: In the 5-2 victory over Brown, three BC players scored their first goals: Andrea Green, Ashley Mothwerwell, and Blake Bolden. In addition to the goal, Blake Bolden tallied two assists in the win against Brown.
- Kelli Stack ended the Eagles series against the Connecticut Huskies with four points (two goals, two assists). She scored a goal on October 30 and had a hand in all three goals on October 31 (one goal compared to two assists).
- October 31: Molly Schaus registered her 20th career shutout and 62nd win.
- In the first eight games of the season, Kelli Stack has scored a goal in seven out of eight games She finished October 2010 with fifteen points (nine goals, six assists) in eight games for Boston College. Stack started every game at center and has accumulated points in every game. She finished the month leading the Eagles in points, goals, power play goals, and shorthanded goals. On October 31, she was involved in all three goals against Connecticut (one goal, two assists). She was part of all three goals scored at Vermont on October 15 (two goals, one assist). Against the Syracuse Orange (on October 9), Stack scored a hat trick.

=== November ===
- On November 20, 2010, Kelli Stack scored a hat trick against rival Boston University. It was the second hat trick of the season, and third of her career. Eight days later, Stack scored two goals in under sixty seconds (the first goal was scored at 17:12 in the third period, and the second was scored at 17:58), as BC beat New Hampshire by a 3-1 tally.

=== December ===
- December 5: Molly Schaus recorded 25 saves in her 11th season win against Harvard at Conte Forum. Freshman Melissa Bizzari put in her best performance of the season. She scored a goal and two assists against Harvard. Kelli Stack scored three goals against Harvard for her third hat trick of the season, fourth in her career. The 6-2 win was the second time BC has scored six goals this season. It was the Eagles fifth all-time win against Harvard. The last Eagles victory over the Crimson was February 10, 2009 to become Beanpot Champions.
- December 9: Seniors Kelli Stack and Molly Schaus, sophomore Blake Bolden, and freshmen Meagan Mangene and Taylor Wasylk were among forty players who were invited to try out for the United States National Women's ice hockey team.

=== January ===
- January 30: In a 2-1 defeat of Northeastern, goaltender Molly Schaus earned her first career assist. She stopped a slapshot which rebounded to Kelli Stack. Stack skated the length of the rink and scored a shorthanded goal, which was also the game winner.

=== February ===
- On February 8, 2011, with two points in the game against Boston University in the first round of the 2011 Beanpot Tournament, Kelli Stack accumulated 199 points in her career and broke BC's all-time career points record, becoming the new program leader.
- February 15: The Eagles won their fourth Beanpot by defeating the Harvard Crimson by a 3-1 score.

=== March ===
- March 5: Kelli Stack scored the game-winning goal in overtime as the Eagles advanced to the Hockey East championship game.

== Regular season ==
=== Standings ===
2010–11 Hockey East Association standings
	Overall							Conference					
	GP	W	L	T	PTS	GF	GA	GP	W	L	T	GF	GA
#4 Boston University†	32	28	4	4	60	117	56	21	15	3	3	66	33
#7 Boston College*	31	20	6	5	45	92	56	21	13	4	4	55	32
#9 Providence	35	22	12	1	45	53	43	21	12	8	1	53	43
Connecticut	18	7	10	1	15	35	51	21	9	9	3	36	39
Northeastern	18	10	4	4	24	48	35	21	6	10	5	42	48
Maine	19	8	7	4	19	54	42	21	6	12	3	37	54
New Hampshire	19	9	10	0	18	33	40	21	7	13	1	35	50
Vermont	33	7	17	9	23	44	77	21	4	13	4	24	49
Championship: Boston College † indicates conference regular season champion * indicates conference tournament champion Current rankings: USCHO.com Division I women's poll

*Rankings based on number of wins in the conference

=== Schedule ===
Date	Opponent	Score	Goal scorers	Record	Conf record
Oct. 8	@ Colgate	4-0	Taylor Waslyk, Melissa Bizzari (2), Kristina Brown	1-0-0	0-0-0
Oct. 9	@ Syracuse	5-2	Taylor Waslyk, Mary Restuccia, Kelli Stack (3)	2-0-0	0-0-0
Oct. 15	@ Vermont	3-0	Kelli Stack (2)	3-0-0	1-0-0
Oct. 16	@ Vermont	4-1	Kelli Stack (1)	4-0-0	2-0-0
Oct. 22	@ Quinnipiac	3-3	Kelli Stack (1)	4-0-1	2-0-0
Oct. 24	Brown	5-2		5-0-1	2-0-0
Oct. 30	Connecticut	2-2	Kelli Stack (1)	5-0-2	2-0-1
Oct. 31	Connecticut	3-0	Kelli Stack (1)	6-0-2	3-0-1
Nov. 3	@ Northeastern	3-1		7-0-2	4-0-1
Nov. 7	Vermont	2-2	Kelli Stack (2)	7-0-3	4-0-2
Nov. 12	@ St. Lawrence	3-7		7-1-3	4-0-2
Nov. 13	@ St. Lawrence	1-1		7-1-4	4-0-2
Nov. 20	@ Boston University	6-3	Kelli Stack (3)	8-1-4	5-0-2
Nov. 21	Boston University	0-1		8-2-4	5-1-2
Nov. 24	Dartmouth	4-2	Kelli Stack (2)	9-2-4	5-1-2
Nov. 28	@ New Hampshire	3-1	Kelli Stack (2)	10-2-4	6-1-2
Feb. 15	Harvard	3-1	Caitlin Walsh, Mary Restuccia, Kelly Stack		

==== Conference record ====
WCHA school	record
Boston University	1-1
Connecticut	1-0-1
Maine	
New Hampshire	1-0
Northeastern	1-0
Providence	
Vermont	2-0-1

== Postseason ==
=== Hockey East tournament ===
Date	Opponent	Score	Goal scorers	Notes
March 5	Providence	3-2 (OT)	Taylor Wasylk, Melissa Bizari, Kelli Stack	Advance to championship game
March 6	Northeastern	3-1	Danielle Welch, Blake Bolden, Taylor Wasylk	Eagles win their 1st WHEA tourney

==== 2011 Hockey East All-Tournament team ====
Player	Position
Blake Bolden	D
Kelli Stack	F

=== Regional matches ===
It was the first time that BC beat Minnesota in school history.

Date	Time	Teams	Score	Notes
March 12	1:00 pm ET	Minnesota (26-9-2) at Boston College (23-6-6)	Boston College, 4-1	Stack with two goals, Schaus with 31 saves

==== Frozen Four - Louis J. Tullio Arena, Erie, Pennsylvania ====
Frozen Four; March 19
1	Wisconsin
4	Boston College
2	Cornell
3	Boston University

Championship Game; March 20

== Awards and honors ==
- Melissa Bizzari, Hockey East Rookie of the Week (Week of March 7)
- Meagan Mangene, 2011 All-Hockey East Honorable Mention
- Meagan Mangene, 2011 Hockey East All-Rookie Team
- Mary Restuccia, Beanpot MVP
- Mary Restuccia, 2011 All-Hockey East Second team
- Molly Schaus, Runner-up: Hockey East Goaltender of the Month (October 2010)
- Molly Schaus, BC, Runner-Up, Hockey East Goaltender of the Month (November 2010)
- Molly Schaus, 2011 Patty Kazmaier Award Nominee
- Molly Schaus, Bertagna Goaltending Award
- Molly Schaus, 2011 All-Hockey East First Team
- Kelli Stack, Hockey East Pure Hockey Player of the Month (October 2010)
- Kelli Stack, Hockey East Pure Hockey Player of the Month, November 2010
- Kelli Stack, Player of the Week (Week of November 1)
- Kelli Stack, Player of the Week (Week of March 7)
- Kelli Stack, 2011 Patty Kazmaier Award Nominee
- Kelli Stack, 2011 All-Hockey East First Team
- Taylor Wasylk, Hockey East Pro Ambitions Rookie of the week (Week of October 11)
- Taylor Wasylk, Hockey East Pro Ambitions Rookie of the week (Week of October 18)
- Taylor Wasylk, Hockey East Pro Ambitions Rookie of the week (Week of October 25)
- Taylor Wasylk, Runner-up: Hockey East, Pro Ambitions Rookie of the Month (October 2010)
- Danielle Welch, Player of the Week (Week of February 7, 2011)
- Danielle Welch, 2011 All-Hockey East Honorable Mention
- Hockey East Team of the Week (Week of February 7, 2011)
- Hockey East Team of the Week (Week of March 7, 2011)

=== Postseason ===
- Army ROTC Three Stars Award: Kelli Stack, Boston College
- Scoring Champion: Kelli Stack, Boston College
- Cammi Granato Award (Hockey East Player of the Year): Kelli Stack, Boston College
- Hockey East tournament MVP: Kelli Stack
- Katie King, Finalist, 2011 AHCA Women's Ice Hockey Division I Coach of the Year

==== All-Rookie team ====
- D: Meagan Mangene, Boston College

==== All-Americans ====
- Molly Schaus, 2011 First Team All-America selection
- Kelli Stack, 2011 Second Team All-America selection

==== New England hockey awards ====
- Kelli Stack, New England Women's Player of the Year
- Mary Restuccia, New England Women's Division I All-Stars
- Molly Schaus, New England Women's Division I All-Stars
- Kelli Stack, New England Women's Division I All-Stars

== CWHL draft picks ==
The following Eagles were claimed in the 2011 CWHL Draft.

Player	Pick	Team
Molly Schaus	2	Boston Blades
Kelli Stack	14	Boston Blades

== See also ==
- 2009–10 Boston College Eagles women's ice hockey season
- 2010–11 Boston College Eagles men's ice hockey season
- 2010–11 Hockey East women's ice hockey season
