= 2010–11 Providence Friars women's ice hockey season =

- Conference: ECAC
- Home ice: Schneider Arena

Rankings
- USA Today/USA Hockey Magazine: Not ranked
- USCHO.com/CBS College Sports: 10

Record
- Overall: 22-12-1

Coaches and captains
- Head coach: Bob Deraney

== Offseason ==
- August 20: Karen Thatcher, a 2006 graduate of Providence, and a participant in ice hockey at the 2010 Winter Olympics for Team USA has been named as a Friars assistant coach.
- Sept 15: The women's ice hockey team organized the first annual Road Hockey Rumble. It was a street hockey tournament to raise money for Children's Charities of Massachusetts and Rhode Island. The tournament was played on Sunday, September 12, and the concept was conceived by junior defenseman Christie Jensen.
- Genevieve Lacasse participated in the evaluation camp for the senior 2010–11 Canadian national women's team. She played for Canada Red (the camp was divided into four teams, Red, White, Yellow, Blue).

== Exhibition ==
Date	Opponent	Score
Sept. 24	McGill	3-1
Sept. 25	McGill	6-4

== Regular season ==
- Kate Bacon scored a hat trick in the Friars 6-1 win over St. Lawrence on Oct. 9. She scored another goal in the Friars victory over Clarkson the next day.
- Genevieve Lacasse stopped 40 shots in Friday's (10/29) 2-2 tie against No. 5 Boston University, including three in overtime. The goalie made several quality saves, including on a partial breakaway in the first period by Terrier's skater Jenn Wakefield. She stopped 14 shots in the opening period and 13 in the third period.
- During October 2010, Friars goalie Genevieve Lacasse had a 1.64 GAA and a .949 save percentage. These numbers were complemented by two shutouts. In addition, she accumulated a league-high 281 saves. In two games, she had over 40 saves.
- December 4–5: Kate Bacon had three points over the weekend. She had a goal and an assist against New Hampshire on Saturday. The following day, she scored her team-leading 14th goal vs. the Connecticut Huskies.
- December 5: Nicole Anderson collected two goals, one unassisted, in the Friars’ 5-1 win the Connecticut Huskies.
- The Friars enter the holiday break with a four-game winning streak. Kate Bacon was one of 40 players invited to USA Hockey's Women's Winter Training Camp. Her last experience for the USA was with the Under-18 team that won the World Championships in 2008. Goalie Genevieve Lacasse was selected to play for Hockey Canada's Under-22's in the 2011 MLP Cup.
- In the 2011 MLP Cup, Friars goalie Genevieve Lacasse earned a shutout in a 5-0 defeat of Switzerland on January 4. Prior to the match, she had made 57 consecutive starts for the Friars.

=== Standings ===
2010–11 Hockey East Association standings
	Overall							Conference					
	GP	W	L	T	PTS	GF	GA	GP	W	L	T	GF	GA
#4 Boston University†	32	28	4	4	60	117	56	21	15	3	3	66	33
#7 Boston College*	31	20	6	5	45	92	56	21	13	4	4	55	32
#9 Providence	35	22	12	1	45	53	43	21	12	8	1	53	43
Connecticut	18	7	10	1	15	35	51	21	9	9	3	36	39
Northeastern	18	10	4	4	24	48	35	21	6	10	5	42	48
Maine	19	8	7	4	19	54	42	21	6	12	3	37	54
New Hampshire	19	9	10	0	18	33	40	21	7	13	1	35	50
Vermont	33	7	17	9	23	44	77	21	4	13	4	24	49
Championship: Boston College † indicates conference regular season champion * indicates conference tournament champion Current rankings: USCHO.com Division I women's poll

*Rankings based on number of wins in the conference

=== Schedule ===
Date	Opponent	Score	Goal scorers	Record	Conference Record
Oct. 1	@ Robert Morris	4-5		0-1-0	0-0-0
Oct. 2	@ Robert Morris	5-2		1-1-0	0-0-0
Oct. 9	St. Lawrence	6-1		2-1-0	
Oct. 10	Clarkson	5-0		3-1-0	
Oct. 15	@ Syracuse	4-1		4-1-0	
Oct. 16	@ Colgate	2-1		5-1-0	
Oct. 22	Rensselaer	2-3		5-2-0	
Oct. 23	Princeton	4-0		6-2-0	
Oct. 28	Boston University	2-2		6-2-1	

== Player stats ==
= Indicates team leader

=== Skaters ===
Player	Games	Goals	Assists	Points	Points/game	PIM	GWG	PPG	SHG

== Postseason ==
- Kelli Stack scored the game-winning goal in overtime as Boston College defeated Providence by a 3-2 tally to advance to the Hockey East championship game. Providence goalie Genevieve Lacasse would break the record set by Florence Schelling earlier in the day for most saves in a tournament game with 58.

== Awards and honors ==
- Corinne Buie, Providence, Hockey East Rookie of the Month,(Week of December 6)
- Corinne Buie, Hockey East Pro Ambitions Rookie of the Month (December 2010)
- Hockey East Coach of the Year: Bob Deraney, Providence
- Bob Deraney, Finalist, 2011 AHCA Women's Ice Hockey Division I Coach of the Year
- Genevieve Lacasse, Hockey East Goaltender of the Month (October 2010)
- Genevieve Lacasse, Hockey East Co-Defensive Player of the Week (Week of November 1)
- Genevieve Lacasse, Hockey East Defensive Player of the Week (Week of February 14)
- Genevieve Lacasse, Providence, Hockey East Goaltender of the Month, (Week of December 6).
- Genevieve Lacasse, Providence, Runner-Up, Hockey East Goaltender of the Month (December 2010)
- Rebecca Morse, Hockey East Pro Ambitions Rookie of the Week (Week of February 28, 2011)
- Providence, Hockey East Team of the Week, (Week of December 6)

=== Postseason ===
- Sportsmanship Award: Jean O'Neill, Providence

==== All-Rookie team ====
- D: Rebecca Morse, Providence
- F: Corinne Buie, Providence

=== Team awards ===
- Team MVP, Genevieve Lacasse
- Seventh player award, Abby Gauthier
- Most Improved, Maggie Pendleton
- Academic Award, Jessica Vella
- Captains' Awards, Alyse Ruff and Jean O'Neill
- Coaches Award, Christina England
- Unsung Hero Award, Jennifer Friedman
