= 2010–11 Northeastern Huskies women's ice hockey season =

RMU Hockey Showcase champions
- Conference: ECAC
- Home ice: Matthews Arena

Record

Coaches and captains
- Head coach: Dave Flint
- Assistant coaches: Linda Lundrigan; Lauren McAuliffe

== Offseason ==
- September 20: In the preseason Hockey East poll, the Huskies were ranked fifth. Northeastern earned 34 points, one point behind fourth-place New Hampshire.

=== Recruiting ===
Player	Position	Nationality	Notes
Maggie DiMasi	Defense	United States	She played hockey at prep school and was the captain of the Rice Knights. As a senior, she accumulated 38 points (21 goals and 17 assists). DiMasi also played three years with the Connecticut Polar Bears. She competed with the Polar Bears at the USA Under-16 National Championships in 2007 and 2008. In both years, the Polar Bears finished second.
Katie MacSorley	Forward	Canada	She scored 40 points (25 goals, 15 assists) last season with the Cambridge Fury. She also played four years with the Stratford Aces and was team captain in 2006–07. She was team MVP in 2005 and 2007. She was an assistant captain in 2009 with Team Ontario and led the squad to a silver medal at the nationals.
Claire Santostefano	Forward	United States	Played the last two years with the Chicago Mission. Took part in the USA Hockey development camp from 2006–09. Santostefano attended New Trier High School and played varsity golf for four years. In addition, she played three years of varsity softball.
Sonia St. Martin	Defense	Canada	St. Martin played against Northeastern in 2009–10 with Dawson College on September 26, 2009. St. Martin played two seasons with the Dawson College Blues. Prior to Dawson College, she played three seasons with the Deux-Rives boys hockey club.

== Exhibition ==
Date	NCAA school	Opponent	Score	Huskies scorers
Sept. 26	Northeastern	McGill	3–2 (OT), Northeastern	Katie McSorley; Lori Antflick; Kristi Kehoe (game winner)

== News and notes ==
- Former players Lindsay Berman, Annie Hogan and Cassie Sperry are all members of the Boston franchise in the Canadian Women's Hockey League. The three played together for Northeastern from 2006 to 2010.

== News and notes ==
- In the opening weekend series, Katie MacSorley scored two straight goals in the season opener. The goal gave the Huskies a 4–3 lead over Syracuse. MacSorley nearly had a hat trick in overtime. She finished the weekend with a plus-1 rating and 10 total shots.
- October 16: Northeastern beat the Colonials by a 4–3 margin in the RMU Hockey Showcase at CONSOL Energy Center. It was the first RMU Hockey Showcase at CONSOL Energy Center.
- Oct. 24: Julia Marty's four-point performance was the first by a Huskies player since Chelsey Jones recorded five points against the Maine Black Bears on Dec. 3, 2006.
- Week of November 1: Florence Schelling made 58 saves on the week for a .951 save percentage. She recorded 34 saves to record her first shutout of the season against Yale, 4–0. She made 24 saves in a loss to Boston College on Wednesday night at Matthews Arena.
- November 21: On November 21, McSorley recorded her first career hat trick and added two assists as the Huskies prevailed by a 5–1 tally over the Providence Friars. The hat trick was the first hat trick for a Northeastern player since Julia Marty in 2008. It was also the first five-point game by a Husky since Chelsey Jones tallied five points against Maine on Dec. 3, 2006.
- Dec . 1: Freshman Rachel Llanes scored the first and last goal of the game in Northeastern’s 4–0 win over New Hampshire with six shots on goal. It was her first-ever multi-goal game. Another freshman, Katie MacSorley scored a goal in the 4–0 win over New Hampshire. Florence Schelling made 22 saves for her third shutout of the season. With the win, Northeastern snapped a 27-game unbeaten streak (0–26–1) against New Hampshire. Their last win over New Hampshire was Jan. 21, 2001, a 2–1 win. In addition, the fact that it was a shutout victory marks the first over UNH in the history of the program.
- December 7: Florence Schelling made a season-high 37 saves in a 3–0 loss versus Boston University.*Heading into the holiday break, every win except the 2–1 victory over Princeton on Oct. 22 has meant that a Husky rookie has recorded at least one point.
- January 1: In the first game of the Easton Holiday Showcase, freshman Maggie Brennolt registered her first collegiate goal. She also added an assist in a 7–2 loss to the No. 2 ranked Wisconsin Badgers. Florence Schelling recorded 29 saves in two periods of play but was replaced by Leah Sulyma. In the third, Sulyma made 12 saves.
- January 2: Dani Rylan scored her first Division 1 goal as the Huskies broke a 1–1 tie with 3:36 remaining in the third period. The Huskies would hold on to the lead versus St. Cloud State and win by a 2–1 tally in their final game of the Easton Holiday Showcase. The win snapped a two-game losing streak.

  - Rylan now has seven points and ensured that a newcomer has scored a point in all but one Husky victory of the season. It is the second-straight game in which a Huskies player scored a goal for the first time at the Division 1 level. Goaltender Florence Schelling recorded a season-high 39 saves, and recorded her 10th win of the season.
- January 3: Florence Schelling will compete for Switzerland in the 2011 MLP Cup, an under-22 tournament. She will compete from Jan. 4–8.
- March 5: Florence Schelling set a Hockey East tournament record with 44 saves, including a record 24 in the first period. The Huskies upset No. 1 seed Boston University by a 4–2 tally at Walter Brown Arena. Alyssa Wohlfeiler tallied two goals and Claire Santostefano potted the game-winning goal.

== Regular season ==
=== Standings ===
2010–11 Hockey East Association standings
	Overall							Conference					
	GP	W	L	T	PTS	GF	GA	GP	W	L	T	GF	GA
#4 Boston University†	32	28	4	4	60	117	56	21	15	3	3	66	33
#7 Boston College*	31	20	6	5	45	92	56	21	13	4	4	55	32
#9 Providence	35	22	12	1	45	53	43	21	12	8	1	53	43
Connecticut	18	7	10	1	15	35	51	21	9	9	3	36	39
Northeastern	18	10	4	4	24	48	35	21	6	10	5	42	48
Maine	19	8	7	4	19	54	42	21	6	12	3	37	54
New Hampshire	19	9	10	0	18	33	40	21	7	13	1	35	50
Vermont	33	7	17	9	23	44	77	21	4	13	4	24	49
Championship: Boston College † indicates conference regular season champion * indicates conference tournament champion Current rankings: USCHO.com Division I women's poll

*Rankings based on number of wins in the conference

=== Schedule ===
- The Huskies will play the Robert Morris Colonials in the College Hockey Showcase at Consol Energy Centre on October 17.
- From January 1 to 2, the Huskies competed in the Easton Holiday Showcase in St. Cloud, Minnesota.
- The women's Beanpot will feature the Huskies from February 8 to the 15th.

Date	Opponent	Location	Time	Score	Goal scorers	Record	Conference Record
Oct. 1	Syracuse	Syracuse, NY	7 pm	4–4	Rachel Llanes, Lori Antflick, Katie McSorley (2)	0–0–1	0–0–0
Oct. 2	Union	Schenectady, NY	3 pm	3–2 (OT)		1–0–1	0–0–0
Oct. 9	Quinnipiac	Hamden, Conn	3 pm	0–4	None	1–1–1	0–0–0
Oct. 16	Robert Morris	Moon Township, PA	2 pm	6–4		2–1–1	0–0–0
Oct. 17	Robert Morris	Pittsburgh, PA	12 pm	4–3		3–1–1	0–0–0
Oct. 22	Princeton	Matthews Arena	4 pm	2–1		4–1–1	0–0–0
Oct. 24	RPI	Matthews Arena	1 pm	5–1		5–1–1	0–0–0
Oct. 29	Vermont	Matthews Arena	1 pm	1–1		5–1–2	0–0–1
Oct. 30	Vermont	Matthews Arena	1 pm	4–1		6–1–2	1–0–1
Nov. 3	Boston College	Matthews Arena	7 pm	1–3		6–2–2	1–1–1
Nov. 6	Yale	Matthews Arena	2 pm	4–0		7–2–2	2–1–1
Nov. 11	Maine	Orono, Maine		0–0	None	7–2–3	2–1–2
Nov. 12	Maine	Orono, Maine		2–2		7–2–4	2–1–3
Nov. 20	Providence	Providence, RI		1–4		7–3–4	2–2–3
Nov. 21	Providence	Matthews Arena		5–1		8–3–4	3–2–3
Nov. 28	Brown	Matthews Arena		2–1		9–3–4	3–2–3
Dec. 1	New Hampshire	Durham, NH		4–0		10–3–4	4–2–3
Dec. 7	Boston University	Boston, MA		0–3	None	10–4–4	4–3–3
Jan. 1	Wisconsin	St. Cloud, Minnesota		2–7		10–5–4	4–3–3
Jan. 2	St. Cloud State	St. Cloud University		2–1		11–5–4	4–3–3
Jan. 9	New Hampshire	Durham, NH		4–2		12–5–4	5–3–3
Jan. 15	Maine	Matthews Arena		3–2		13–5–4	6–3–3
Jan. 16	Boston College	Matthews Arena		1–4		13–6–4	6–4–3
Jan. 22	New Hampshire	Matthews Arena		3–4 (OT)		13–7–4	6–5–3
Jan. 23	Providence	Kingston, MA		1–2		13–8–4	6–6–3
Jan. 28	Vermont	Burlington, VT		2–1 (OT)		14–8–4	7–6–3
Jan. 30	Boston College	Chestnut Hill, MA		1–2		14–9–4	7–7–3
Feb. 6	Connecticut	Storrs, CT		2–2		14–9–5	7–7–4
Feb. 8	Harvard	Chestnut Hill, MA		3–3 (SO loss)		14–9–6	7–7–4
Feb. 11	Boston University	Boston, MA		3–4		14–10–6	7–8–4
Feb. 12	Boston University	Matthews Arena		1–5		14–11–6	7–9–4
Feb. 15	Boston University	Chestnut Hill, MA		3–3		14–11–7	7–9–5
Feb. 19	Connecticut	Matthews Arena		2–4		14–12–7	7–10–5
Feb. 20	Connecticut	Storrs, CT	1–1			14–12–8	7–10–6

== Player stats ==
= Indicates team leader

=== Skaters ===
Player	Games	Goals	Assists	Points	Points/game	PIM	GWG	PPG	SHG

== Postseason ==
=== Hockey East tournament ===
Date	Opponent	Score	Goal scorers	Notes
March 5	Boston University	4–2	Alyssa Wohlfeiler (2), Julia Marty, Claire Santostefano	Advance to championship game
March 6	Boston College			

== Awards and honors ==
- Rachel Llanes, Runner-up: Hockey East, Pro Ambitions Rookie of the Month (October 2010)
- Katie MacSorley, Northeastern Student-Athlete of the week for Sept. 27-Oct. 3.
- Katie MacSorley, Runner-up: Hockey East, Pro Ambitions Rookie of the Month (October 2010)
- Katie MacSorley, Co-Hockey East Player of the Week (Week of November 22)
- Casey Pickett, Hockey East Pure Hockey Player of the Week, (Week of February 28, 2011)
- Dani Rylan, Northeastern University Student Athlete of the Week (Week of January 3, 2011)
- Florence Schelling, Hockey East Defensive Player of the Week (Week of November 8)
- Florence Schelling, Hockey East Defensive Player of the Week (Week of February 28)
- Florence Schelling, Hockey East Defensive Player of the Week (Week of March 7)

=== Postseason ===
- Turfer Athletic Award: Northeastern University

==== All-Rookie team ====
- F: Katie MacSorley, Northeastern

=== Team awards ===
- Alyssa Wohlfeiler, Team MVP
- Maggie DiMasi, Rookie of the Year honors
- Casey Pickett, Kathryn Waldo 7th Player Award
- Autumn Prouty, Coaches Award
- Siena Falino, Academic Award
