= 2010–11 Maine Black Bears women's ice hockey season =

- Conference: Hockey East
- Home ice: Alfond Arena

Rankings
- USA Today/USA Hockey Magazine: Not ranked
- USCHO.com/CBS College Sports: Not ranked

Record
- Overall: 7–8–3
- Home: 4–4–2
- Road: 3–4–1

Coaches and captains
- Head coach: Maria Lewis
- Assistant coaches: Richard Reichenbach; Kevin Sommer
- Captain: Dawn Sullivan
- Alternate captain(s): Jordan Colliton, Ashley Norum

== Offseason ==
- May 5: Jenna Ouellette will continue her playing career in Switzerland. She signed a professional contract to play in Langethal for the DHC Langenthal Club. The club is part of the Swiss Division I league.
- July 16: Maria Lewis has been named the new head coach of the Black Bears. She spe the last three seasons as an assistant coach at the University of North Dakota. During the 1999–2000 season, she was a volunteer coach with the Black Bears.

== Recruiting ==
- April 28: Former ice hockey coach Dan Lichterman announced the program has received five commitments for the 2010–2011 season. Forwards Missy Denk, Kristi King, Jenny Kistner, defenders Kelly McDonald and Kayla Kaluzny will join the Black Bears for the upcoming season.

Player	Position	Nationality	Notes
Missy Denk	Forward	United States	Denk was an assistant captain last season for the Chicago Mission. She scored 21 goals and added 22 assists.
Kristy King	Forward	United States	King served as captain for the Stillwater Ponies. She scored 13 goals and added 20 assists.
Kayla Kaluzny	Defense	Canada	Kaluzny was a four-year captain and played for the Edge School Mountaineers. She played for Team Alberta in 2009 and also played at the Canadian U18 Championships.
Jenny Kistner	Defense	United States	Kistner also played for the Chicago Mission. She scored 10 goals and added 24 assists.
Kelly McDonald	Defense	Canada	McDonald comes from the Stoney Creek Jr. Sabres. She had 19 points and had a plus/minus rating of +35.

== Regular season ==
=== News and notes ===
- Brittany Ott made a school record 69 saves on October 9 against the Mercyhurst Lakers. She made 34 saves in the second period. The following day, Ott made 45 saves to give her a total of 114 saves against Mercyhurst.
- At 3–3–0, Maine has had the best start to a season since they were 3–2–1 to start the season in 2004–05
- December 3: Kelly McDonald tallied her first collegiate point with an assist.
- December 4–5: Dawn Sullivan scored a game-winning goal and accumulated three assists on the weekend for Maine.
- December 5: The Black Bears had their six-game unbeaten streak snapped when they lost to Vermont 4–3 in overtime. The Black Bears have scored power play goals in their last five games as Jennie Gallo is the Black Bears leader with five power play tallies.
- December 31: The Black Bears are raising funds for Breast Cancer research by selling pink pucks for a minimum donation of one dollar. The Pink Puck campaign leads up to the annual Skating Strides Against Breast Cancer game that will take place this season on Jan. 22 against Connecticut.
- Heading into the holiday break, the Black Bears are now 2–2–0 against the ECAC and are 6–4–2 in non-conference play. Their seven wins this season is the most for the program since the 2006–07 season. In addition, the Black Bears ran a streak of scoring a power play goal in six straight games (snapped on December 10). Brittany Dougherty had a six-game point scoring streak (also snapped on the 10th). The team is undefeated when scoring the first goal of the game as they are 7–0–2.
- January 2: Maine lost 2–1 to the Providence Friars. Dominique Goutsis notched the lone goal for Maine. With the goal, she set a new career high for goals in a season (it was her fourth goal). Despite the loss, Maine is off to their best start in five years at 8–8–4 since starting the 2005–06 season at 10–4–5.
- February 12:Myriam Croussette scored the opening goal just 20 seconds into the game against Boston College. Her second goal of the contest was a game-winning goal (and her third point of the game). The Black Bears now pulled to within one point of New Hampshire for the final playoff spot.

=== Standings ===
2010–11 Hockey East Association standings
	Overall							Conference					
	GP	W	L	T	PTS	GF	GA	GP	W	L	T	GF	GA
#4 Boston University†	32	28	4	4	60	117	56	21	15	3	3	66	33
#7 Boston College*	31	20	6	5	45	92	56	21	13	4	4	55	32
#9 Providence	35	22	12	1	45	53	43	21	12	8	1	53	43
Connecticut	18	7	10	1	15	35	51	21	9	9	3	36	39
Northeastern	18	10	4	4	24	48	35	21	6	10	5	42	48
Maine	19	8	7	4	19	54	42	21	6	12	3	37	54
New Hampshire	19	9	10	0	18	33	40	21	7	13	1	35	50
Vermont	33	7	17	9	23	44	77	21	4	13	4	24	49
Championship: Boston College † indicates conference regular season champion * indicates conference tournament champion Current rankings: USCHO.com Division I women's poll

*Rankings based on number of wins in the conference

=== Schedule ===
Date	Opponent	Time	Score	Record
Nov. 6	vs. Connecticut *	1:00 p.m.		
Nov. 23	at New Hampshire (at Lewiston, Maine)	7:30 PM		
Dec 3	Vermont	7:00pm		
Dec 4	Vermont	4:00pm		
Jan. 2	vs. Maine	8:00 p.m. ET	1–2	
Jan. 16	vs. Boston University *	3:00 p.m. ET		
Jan. 21	at Connecticut	7:00 p.m.		
Jan. 22	at Connecticut	2:00 p.m.		
Jan. 29	New Hampshire *	2:00 PM		
Jan. 30	New Hampshire *	2:00 PM		
Feb 5	at Vermont	2:00pm		
Feb. 18	at Boston University *	7:00 p.m. ET		
Feb. 19	at Boston University *	TBA		

==== Conference record ====
WCHA school	Record
Boston College	
Boston University	
Connecticut	
New Hampshire	
Northeastern	
Providence	
Vermont	

== Awards and honors ==
- Myriam Crousette, Hockey East Player of the Week (Week of February 14)

- Candice Currier, Maine, Runner-Up, Hockey East Goaltender of the Month (December 2010)
- Brittany Dougherty, Hockey East Player of the Week (Week of September 27)
- Jenny Kistner, Hockey East Rookie of the Week (Week of September 27)
- Brittany Ott, Hockey East Defensive Player of the Week (Week of September 27)
- Brittany Ott, Hockey East Defensive Player of the Week (Week of October 11)
- Brittany Ott, Maine, Runner-Up, Hockey East Goaltender of the Month (November 2010)
- Dawn Sullivan, Runner-Up, Hockey East Pure Hockey Player of the Month (December 2010)
- Hockey East women's Team of the Week (Week of September 27)
- Hockey East women's Team of the Week (Week of February 14)

== See also ==
- 2010–11 Hockey East women's ice hockey season
