= 2010–11 Boston University Terriers women's ice hockey season =

Runner-up, 4-1 vs. Wisconsin
- Conference: Hockey East
- Home ice: Agganis Arena

Rankings
- USA Today/USA Hockey Magazine: 3
- USCHO.com/CBS College Sports: 2

Record
- Overall: 27-7-4

Coaches and captains
- Head coach: Brian Durocher
- Assistant coaches: Katie Lachapelle; Allison Coomey; Todd Langlais
- Captain: Holly Lorms
- Alternate captain(s): Lauren Cherewyk and Jillian Kirchner

The Boston University Terriers women's ice hockey team represented Boston University in the 2010–11 NCAA Division I women's ice hockey season. The Terriers were coached by Brian Durocher and they were the first team in Hockey East to qualify for the NCAA Frozen Four championship game. In addition, Catherine Ward became the first Terriers player to be recognized as an All-American selection. Ward also set a program single-season record for most assists in one season with 27.

== Offseason ==
- April 12, 2010: Holly Lorms has been named captain for the season.
- June 2, 2010: 2010 Canadian Olympic gold medallists Catherine Ward and Marie-Philip Poulin have tentatively agreed to join the Terriers.
- August 16, 2010: Four Terriers players were named to Canada's Under 22 team. Jenelle Kohanchuk, Tara Watchorn, Jennifer Wakefield and Marie-Philip Poulin will take part in an exhibition series against the United States Under 22 team from August 18–21 in Toronto.
- Jennifer Wakefield participated in the evaluation camp for the senior 2010–11 Canadian national women's team. She played for Canada Red (the camp was divided into four teams, Red, White, Yellow, Blue) with Jenelle Kohanchuk. Tara Watchorn played for Canada White. Marie-Philip Poulin played for Canada Yellow.
- September 28: In the USA Today/USA Hockey Magazine Women's College Hockey Poll, the Terriers have been voted as the pre-season Number 4.

=== Recruiting ===
| Player | Position | Nationality | Notes |
|---|---|---|---|
| Anya Battaglino | Defense | United States | Helped Waltham High School qualify for the Massachusetts state tournament four straight years (2007-10). She was a Dual County League All-Star her senior season. |
| Caroline Campbell | Defense | United States | She was part of the Chicago Mission Under 19 team from 2008-10. She participated for Team USA at the 2009 IIHF World Women's U18 Championship and won a gold medal. |
| Kaleigh Fratkin | Defense | Canada | She was the first female to play on a British Columbia midget major boys' hockey team. The team was the Vancouver North West Giants of the British Columbia Midget Major League and she helped lead the Giants to the 2010 provincial championship. Fratkin was a finalist for the 2010 BC Athlete of the Year. |
| Braly Hiller | Goaltender | United States | Played high school at Tabor Academy (Mass.) and was team captain senior year, in 2006, she took part in the USA Hockey Girls' Select 14 Player Development Camp |
| Marie-Philip Poulin | Forward | Canada | Scored the two goals in Canada's 2-0 victory over the U.S. in the 2010 Olympics gold-medal game. In addition, she won the silver medal at the 2009 IIHF World Women's Championship and 2008 IIHF World Women's U18 Championship. |
| Meghan Riggs | Forward | United States | Played high school hockey at Eden Prairie (Minn.), part of team that won state championship in 2008, An All-Conference Honorable Mention selection her junior and senior seasons, was team captain in 2009-10 |
| Kerrin Sperry | Goaltender | United States | Played four years at Lawrence Academy (Mass.) of the Independent School League, in her senior year, was named to the All-ISL First Team and team MVP |
| Catherine Ward | Defense | Canada | |
| Louise Warren | Forward | Canada | Warren played for four years at Brewster Academy in New Hampshire. In her junior year, she was the team's Most Valuable Player. As a freshman, she won the most promising athlete award. |

== Exhibition ==
| Date | Opponent | Location | Time | Goal scorers | Record |
|---|---|---|---|---|---|
| 09/25/10 | vs. University of Windsor ^ | Walter Brown Arena | 3:00 p.m. ET | 4-1, BU | Jillian Kirchner; Jill Cardella; Britt Hergesheimer; Louise Warren |

== Regular season ==
=== News and notes ===
==== October ====
- October 2: Olympic gold medallist Marie-Philip Poulin scored a goal for Boston University in her first NCAA game.
- October 3: By defeating North Dakota by a 6–2 mark, it signified the first time in program history that the Terriers defeated an opponent from the WCHA.
- With her third shorthanded goal of the season on Oct. 15, freshman Marie-Philip Poulin tied BU's single-season record for shorthanded tallies in just four games.
- October 22–23: The Terriers won their fifth and sixth straight games, matching the program record for most consecutive wins. The Terriers last won six games in a row from Feb. 20 – March 7, 2010. So far this season, Jennifer Wakefield and freshman Marie-Philip Poulin have registered at least one point in each game this season
- The Terriers were on a program-best seven-game unbeaten streak (6-0-1) to start the season.
- In her first six collegiate starts, goaltender Kerrin Sperry is unbeaten.
- In the first seven games of the season, Jenn Wakefield, has registered at least one point in each game this season, and has accumulated 15 points (10 goals, 5 assists).
- Marie-Philip Poulin led all NCAA freshmen in goals (9) and points per game (2.00) during October 2010. In addition, she led all Hockey East freshmen in goals, assists and points, and ranked during the month. She was ranked first among all Hockey East players in shorthanded goals with three. In the first seven games of her NCAA career, she had a seven-game point-scoring streak consisting of nine goals and seven assists.

==== November ====
- November 6–7: The Terriers posted two victories at home over Providence on Saturday (4-1) and New Hampshire on Sunday (5-2). The penalty kill was a perfect 7-for-7. The Terriers outshot the Friars, 45-28 for the game in the victory on Saturday. Kathryn Miller scored two goals and three assists as the Terriers triumphed over Providence and New Hampshire. Miller had the assist on Louise Warren's game-winning goal against Providence on Saturday
- Kerrin Sperry continued her undefeated season through November as she collected a 3-0-1 record. From a statistical standpoint, she had a 1.47 GAA, .941 save percentage. Overall, the undefeated streak starts her collegiate career with eight wins and two ties. She allowed two goals or less in each game during November 2010. She stopped a career-high 29 shots in a 2–2 tie with Vermont and collected her first career shutout with 22 saves in a 1–0 win over state rival Boston College.

==== December ====
- December 4: Kerrin Sperry collected her second shutout of the season with 12 saves in a 4–0 win over the Connecticut Huskies. Jenn Wakefield recorded two goals, including a power-play marker and her fifth game-winning goal. By scoring the game-winning goal, Wakefield ranks second in the NCAA with five game-winning tallies. In addition, the Terriers successfully defended all three UConn power plays.
- December 7 and 10: In wins over Northeastern and Harvard, Wakefield recorded four points (2 goals, 2 assists) in wins over Northeastern and Harvard. On December 7, Wakefield had one goal and two assists as the Terriers defeated the Huskies by a 3–0 mark. She recorded 13 shots on goal in the two games. Marie-Philip Poulin registered three goals. In both games, she had a total of 11 shots on goal and a +2 rating. On December 10, she scored two goals and a game-high eight shots as BU prevailed by a 5–3 mark over Harvard.
- The week of December 13, BU received their highest ranking in program history (No. 3) in the national polls. Boston University heads into the holiday break with its best record at the season's midway point (14-3-2). After shutting out Northeastern by a 3-0 margin on December 7, it stands as their first back-to-back shutouts for the first time since Oct. 21–22, 2006 (Vermont). On December 10, BU defeated Harvard for the first time in program history. In the first half, BU is 6-0-0 against ECAC opponents.
- In the first half of the 2010–11 season, Kerrin Sperry collected three shutouts and became the first Terrier netminder to record back-to-back shutouts. She accomplished the feat after blanking Connecticut, 4–0, on Dec. 4 and the Northeastern Huskies, 3–0, on Dec. 7.

==== January ====
- January 2: The Terriers blanked Brown, 4–0, for its third shutout in the last four games. With the win, the Terriers have accumulated a program-best seven-game winning streak and improved to 7-0-0 against ECAC Hockey teams in 2010–11. In the win, Marie-Philip Poulin extended her point-scoring streak to six games (5 goals, 7 assists). In addition, goalie Alissa Fromkin turned aside all 14 shots for her first collegiate shutout.
- Jan 15: The Terriers picked up two wins to extend its winning streak to 10 games. The Terriers defeated rival Boston College by a 4–0 mark. With the win, the Terriers clinch the regular-season series. This was the second time this season that the Eagles were shut out by BU. (The previous shutout was Nov. 21)
- On January 16, 2011, the Terriers defeated Maine and set a program record with their 11th home win of the season. The previous mark was 10 wins during the 2006–07 season.
- On January 22, 2011, Poulin recorded a hat trick, including two power play goals as BU prevailed over Vermont in a 4–0 win. The win was the Terriers 100th win in program history. Poulin broke BU's single-season points record with her second goal of the game and later tied the single-season goals record with her third

marker.

==== May ====
- May 7: Jenn Wakefield was named captain of the 2011-12 team. The assistant captains include Kasey Boucher, Carly Warren and Marie-Philip Poulin.

=== Standings ===
2010–11 Hockey East Association standings
| | Overall | | | | | | | Conference | | | | | |
| | GP | W | L | T | PTS | GF | GA | GP | W | L | T | GF | GA |
|---|---|---|---|---|---|---|---|---|---|---|---|---|---|
| #4 Boston University† | 32 | 28 | 4 | 4 | 60 | 117 | 56 | 21 | 15 | 3 | 3 | 66 | 33 |
| #7 Boston College* | 31 | 20 | 6 | 5 | 45 | 92 | 56 | 21 | 13 | 4 | 4 | 55 | 32 |
| #9 Providence | 35 | 22 | 12 | 1 | 45 | 53 | 43 | 21 | 12 | 8 | 1 | 53 | 43 |
| Connecticut | 18 | 7 | 10 | 1 | 15 | 35 | 51 | 21 | 9 | 9 | 3 | 36 | 39 |
| Northeastern | 18 | 10 | 4 | 4 | 24 | 48 | 35 | 21 | 6 | 10 | 5 | 42 | 48 |
| Maine | 19 | 8 | 7 | 4 | 19 | 54 | 42 | 21 | 6 | 12 | 3 | 37 | 54 |
| New Hampshire | 19 | 9 | 10 | 0 | 18 | 33 | 40 | 21 | 7 | 13 | 1 | 35 | 50 |
| Vermont | 33 | 7 | 17 | 9 | 23 | 44 | 77 | 21 | 4 | 13 | 4 | 24 | 49 |
Championship: Boston College † indicates conference regular season champion * indicates conference tournament champion Current rankings: USCHO.com Division I women's poll

*Rankings based on number of wins in the conference

=== Schedule ===
| Date | Opponent | Location | Time | Score | Record | Conference Record | Goal scorers |
|---|---|---|---|---|---|---|---|
| 10/02/10 | at North Dakota | Grand Forks, N.D. | 2:07 p.m. ET | 4-5 | 0-1-0 | 0-0-0 | Jillian Kirchner, Louise Warren, Jenn Wakefield, Marie-Philip Poulin |
| 10/03/10 | at North Dakota | Grand Forks, N.D. | 2:07 p.m. ET | 6-2 | 1-1-0 | 0-0-0 | Jenn Wakefield (2), Jenelle Kohanchuk, Marie-Philip Poulin (2), Jillian Kirchner |
| 10/09/10 | at Union | Schenectady, N.Y. | 2:00 p.m. ET | 6-2 | 2-1-0 | 0-0-0 | Marie-Philip Poulin, |
| 10/15/10 | vs. Wayne State | Walter Brown Arena | 7:00 p.m. ET | 7-2 | 3-1-0 | 0-0-0 | Marie-Philip Poulin (4), Kasey Boucher, Jenn Wakefield, Tara Watchorn |
| 10/16/10 | vs. Wayne State | Walter Brown Arena | 2:00 p.m. ET | 4-1 | 4-1-0 | 0-0-0 | |
| 10/22/10 | vs. St. Lawrence | Walter Brown Arena | 7:00 p.m. ET | 2-1 | 5-1-0 | 0-0-0 | |
| 10/23/10 | vs. Clarkson | Walter Brown Arena | 3:00 p.m. ET | 3-2 | 6-1-0 | 0-0-0 | Marie-Philip Poulin, |
| 10/29/10 | at Providence | Providence, R.I. | 7:00 p.m. ET | 2-2 | 6-1-1 | 0-0-1 | |
| 11/06/10 | vs. Providence | Walter Brown Arena | 3:00 p.m. ET | | | | |
| 11/07/10 | vs. New Hampshire * | Walter Brown Arena | 4:00 p.m. ET | 5-2 | | | |
| 11/12/10 | vs. Vermont * | Walter Brown Arena | 3:00 p.m. ET | | | | |
| 11/13/10 | vs. Vermont * | Walter Brown Arena | 3:00 p.m. ET | 2-2 | | | |
| 11/20/10 | at Boston College * | Chestnut Hill, Mass. | TBA | | | | |
| 11/21/10 | vs. Boston College * | Walter Brown Arena | 3:00 p.m. ET | 1-0 | | | |
| 11/26/10 | vs. Princeton | Walter Brown Arena | 7:00 p.m. ET | 8-2 | | | |
| 11/27/10 | vs. Princeton | Agganis Arena | 2:00 p.m. ET | | | | |
| 12/04/10 | at Connecticut | Storrs, Conn. | 1:00 p.m. ET | | | | |
| 12/07/10 | vs. Northeastern | Walter Brown Arena | 7:00 p.m. ET | | | | |
| 12/10/10 | at Harvard | Cambridge, Mass. | 7:00 p.m. ET | | | | |
| 01/02/11 | at Brown | Providence, R.I. | 2:00 p.m. ET | 2-0 | | | |
| 01/09/11 | vs. Providence | Walter Brown Arena | 3:00 p.m. ET | | | | |
| 01/15/11 | at Boston College | Chestnut Hill, Mass. | TBA | | | | |
| 01/16/11 | vs. Maine * | Walter Brown Arena | 3:00 p.m. ET | | | | |
| 01/22/11 | at Vermont * | Burlington, Vt. | 2:00 p.m. ET | | | | |
| 01/28/11 | vs. Connecticut * | Walter Brown Arena | 7:00 p.m. ET | | | | |
| 01/29/11 | at Connecticut * | Storrs, Conn. | 4:00 p.m. ET | | | | |
| 02/03/11 | vs. New Hampshire * | Walter Brown Arena | 7:00 p.m. ET | | | | |
| 02/05/11 | at New Hampshire * | Durham, N.H. | 2:00 p.m. ET | | | | |
| 02/08/11 | vs. Boston College | Chestnut Hill, Mass. (Silvio O. Conte Forum) | 8:00 p.m. ET | | | | |
| 02/15/11 | Harvard or Northeastern | Chestnut Hill, Mass. (Silvio O. Conte Forum) TBA | | | | | |
| 02/12/11 | at Northeastern * | Boston, Mass. | 2:00 p.m. ET | | | | |
| 02/13/11 | vs. Northeastern * | Walter Brown Arena | 3:00 p.m. ET | | | | |
| 02/18/11 | at Maine * | Orono, Maine | 7:00 p.m. ET | | | | |
| 02/19/11 | at Maine * | Orono, Maine | TBA | | | | |

==== Conference record ====
| WCHA school | record |
|---|---|
| Boston College | |
| Connecticut | |
| Maine | |
| New Hampshire | |
| Northeastern | |
| Providence | |
| Vermont | |

== Postseason ==
- Despite being eliminated in the semi-finals of the Hockey East tournament, the Terriers were an at-large selection to participate in the 2011 NCAA Women's Division I Ice hockey Tournament.

=== Hockey East tournament ===
| Date | Opponent | Score | Record | Goal scorers | Notes |
|---|---|---|---|---|---|
| March 5 | Northeastern | 2-4 | Jenn Wakefield (2) | Lost semi-final game | |

=== NCAA tournament ===
==== Regional matches ====
| Date | Time | Teams | Score | Notes |
|---|---|---|---|---|
| March 12 | 2:00 pm ET | Mercyhurst (29-5-0) at Boston University (25-6-3) | Boston University, 4-2 | Terriers make their first trip to the Frozen Four |

==== Frozen Four - Louis J. Tullio Arena, Erie, Pennsylvania ====
- March 18: Senior Jillian Kirchner and junior Jenelle Kohanchuk scored in a 50-second span, as the Terriers advanced to the national championship game. Kirchner's goal was the game winner as the Terriers improved to 27-6-4 and became the first Hockey East school to advance to the national title game.
- March 20: In the championship, Marie-Philip Poulin was the only player who scored a goal as the Terriers fell by a 4–1 score to Wisconsin.

Frozen Four; March 19
1 | Wisconsin | 3
4 | Boston College | 2
2 | Cornell | 1
3 | Boston University | 4

Championship Game; March 20
1 | Wisconsin | 4
3 | Boston University | 1

== Awards and honors ==
- Brian Durocher, Finalist, 2011 AHCA Women's Ice Hockey Division I Coach of the Year
- Jenelle Kohanchuk, BU, Runner-Up, Hockey East Player of the Month (November 2010)
- Kathryn Miller, Hockey East Player of the Week (Week of November 8)
- Marie-Philip Poulin, Hockey East Pure Hockey Player of the Week (Week of October 18)
- Marie-Philip Poulin, Hockey East Rookie of the Month (October 2010)
- Marie-Philip Poulin, Hockey East Rookie of the Month (March 2011)
- Marie-Philip Poulin, Hockey Pro Ambitions Rookie of the Week (Week of December 13, 2010)
- Marie-Philip Poulin, Hockey East Pro Ambitions Rookie of the Week, (Week of January 3, 2011)
- Marie-Philip Poulin, Runner-Up, Hockey East Pro Ambitions Rookie of the Month (December 2010)
- Marie-Philip Poulin, Hockey East Pro Ambitions Rookie of the Week (Week of January 24, 2011)
- Kerrin Sperry, Hockey East Rookie of the Week (Week of October 4)
- Kerrin Sperry, Runner-up: Hockey East Goaltender of the Month (October 2010)
- Kerrin Sperry, Hockey East Co-Rookie of the Month, November 2010
- Kerrin Sperry, Hockey East Goaltender of the Month (December 2010)
- Jennifer Wakefield, Hockey East Pure Hockey Player of the Week (Week of October 4)
- Jennifer Wakefield, Runner-up: Hockey East, Pro Ambitions Rookie of the Month (October 2010)
- Jennifer Wakefield, Hockey East Pure Hockey Player of the Week (Week of December 13, 2010)
- Jenn Wakefield, Hockey East Pure Hockey Player of the Month (December 2010)
- Jenn Wakefield, Hockey East Pure Hockey Player of the Week
- Hockey East Team of the Week (Week of November 8)
- Boston University, WHEA Team of the Week (Week of December 13, 2010)

=== Postseason ===
- Best Defenseman Award: Catherine Ward, Boston University
- Best Defensive Forward: Holly Lorms, Boston University
- Goaltending Champion: Kerrin Sperry, Boston University
- Rookie of the Year: Marie-Philip Poulin, Boston University
- Jenn Wakefield, 2011 Hockey East All-Tournament team

==== All-Rookie team ====
- G: Kerrin Sperry, Boston University
- F: Marie-Philip Poulin, Boston University (unanimous selection)

==== All-American ====
- Catherine Ward, Second Team All-American

==== NCAA tournament ====
- Catherine Ward, 2011 NCAA Frozen Four All-Tournament team

==== New England all-stars ====
- Catherine Ward, New England Women's Division I All-Star selection
- Jenn Wakefield, New England Women's Division I All-Star selection
- Marie-Philip Poulin, New England Women's Division I All-Star selection

==== Team awards ====
- Lauren Cherewyk: Strength and conditioning award
- Catherine Ward: Team MVP honors
- Kathryn Miller: Most improved player recognition
- Louise Warren: Friends of Hockey Unsung Hero Award
- Anya Battaglino: Caroline Bourdeau Spirit Award
- Alissa Fromkin: Scholar-Athlete honors

== CWHL draft picks ==
The following were selected in the 2011 CWHL Draft.

| Player | Pick | Team |
|---|---|---|
| Catherine Ward | 7 | Montreal Stars |
