= 2010–11 New Hampshire Wildcats women's ice hockey season =

- Conference: Hockey East

Record

Coaches and captains
- Head coach: Brian McCloskey
- Assistant coaches: Erin Whitten; Jamie Wood

== Offseason ==
- June 7: After two seasons with the Minnesota Golden Gophers, Jamie Wood has become an associate head coach with New Hampshire.
- Courtney Birchard participated in the evaluation camp for the senior 2010–11 Canadian national women's team. She played for Canada Red (the camp was divided into four teams, Red, White, Yellow, Blue). Hannah Armstrong played for Canada White.

== Regular season ==
=== News and notes ===
- Both of Kristina Lavoie’s goals this season have been game-winners; last year, only one of her 18 goals was a game-winning tally.
- Following a 9-for-9 effort at Union, UNH’s penalty kill is perfect this season at 30-for-30.
- October 22: Julie Allen was a factor in both Huskies goals vs. Clarkson in a 2-1 triumph. Allen set up the game-tying goal and scoring the game-winning goal
- October 23: Courtney Birchard registered three points with a goal and two assists in UNH’s 5-3 win against St. Lawrence.
- Lindsey Minton stopped all 49 shots she faced in a two-game series against Niagara to lead the Wildcats to 1-0 and 2-0 victories. She made a season-high 25 saves in the 1-0 overtime triumph. Minton kept the Purple Eagles off the scoresheet on all 11 power-play opportunities (16 shots). In October, Minton has allowed one goal or less in five of six games.
- November 13: The 1-0 shutout by Connecticut on November 13 ended New Hampshire’s 17-game unbeaten streak against the Huskies The Huskies penalty kill was a perfect 6-of-6 on the weekend. The shutout on November 13 marked the first time the Wildcats were shut out at home since Nov. 28, 2004 (by Mercyhurst), a streak of 109 consecutive home games.
- December 1: The Huskies loss to Northeastern on December 1 ended a 27-game unbeaten streak (26-0-1) vs. the Huskies. The last loss to Northeastern was a 2-1 mark on January 21, 2001. The shutout victory for Northeastern marks the first over UNH in the history of the program.
- December 4 : Julie Allen collected a career-high two goals at 10th-ranked Providence on December 4. Goaltender Kayley Herman matched her season high of 27 saves December 4. The Wildcats surrendered two power-play goals in a game for the first time this season as Providence went 2-for-7 on the power play. In the game, the Wildcats scored their first power play goal since Oct. 23 vs. St. Lawrence.
- December 9 and 11: Lindsey Minton stopped 57 of 60 shots for a .950 save percentage and 1.52 GAA in two games. In a 3-1 loss against Harvard, Minton was credited with 29 saves, including 14 in the second period. Two days later, she made 28 saves against Dartmouth, to record her fourth shutout of the season as the Wildcats triumphed by a 1-0 mark.
- February 11: Nicole Gifford recorded her first career multiple-point game with a goal and an assist in a 4-2 defeat against Vermont.

=== Career firsts ===
- Nicole Gifford recorded her first career point with a goal at RPI.
- Maggie Hunt tallied her first collegiate point with an assist vs. the Engineers
- Emma Clark recorded her first point as a UNH Wildcat with an assist at RPI.
- Lindsey Minton earned her first collegiate point with an assist during her 19-save effort at Union.

=== Standings ===
2010–11 Hockey East Association standings
	Overall							Conference					
	GP	W	L	T	PTS	GF	GA	GP	W	L	T	GF	GA
#4 Boston University†	32	28	4	4	60	117	56	21	15	3	3	66	33
#7 Boston College*	31	20	6	5	45	92	56	21	13	4	4	55	32
#9 Providence	35	22	12	1	45	53	43	21	12	8	1	53	43
Connecticut	18	7	10	1	15	35	51	21	9	9	3	36	39
Northeastern	18	10	4	4	24	48	35	21	6	10	5	42	48
Maine	19	8	7	4	19	54	42	21	6	12	3	37	54
New Hampshire	19	9	10	0	18	33	40	21	7	13	1	35	50
Vermont	33	7	17	9	23	44	77	21	4	13	4	24	49
Championship: Boston College † indicates conference regular season champion * indicates conference tournament champion Current rankings: USCHO.com Division I women's poll

*Rankings based on number of wins in the conference

=== Schedule ===
Date	Opponent	Time	Score	Record
Sat Oct. 2	at Connecticut *	1:00 PM		
Fri Oct. 8	at Syracuse	7:00 PM		
Sat Oct. 9	at Colgate	4:00 PM		
Fri Oct. 15	at Rensselaer	7:00 PM		
Sat Oct. 16	at Union	4:00 PM		
Fri Oct. 22	Clarkson	7:00 PM		
Sat Oct. 23	St. Lawrence	5:00 PM		
Fri Oct. 29	Niagara	7:00 PM		
Sat Oct. 30	Niagara	2:00 PM		
Sat Nov. 6	Vermont *	5:00 PM		
Sun Nov. 7	at Boston U. *	4:00 PM		
Sat Nov. 13	Connecticut *	2:00 PM	0-1	
Sun Nov. 14	at Connecticut *	1:00 PM		
Tue Nov. 23	at Maine (at Lewiston, Maine)	7:30 PM		
Sun Nov. 28	Boston College *	2:00 PM		
Wed Dec. 1	Northeastern *	7:00 PM		
Sat Dec. 4	at Providence *	1:00 PM		
Thu Dec. 9	Harvard	7:00 PM		
Sat Dec. 11	Dartmouth	2:00 PM		
Sun Jan. 9	Northeastern *	2:00 PM		
Fri Jan. 14	Providence *	7:00 PM		
Sat Jan. 15	at Providence *	7:00 PM		
Tue Jan. 18	at Quinnipiac	7:00 PM		
Sat Jan. 22	at Northeastern *	2:00 PM		
Sat Jan. 29	Maine *	2:00 PM		
Sun Jan. 30	Maine *	2:00 PM		
Thu Feb. 3	at Boston U. *	7:00 PM		
Sat Feb. 5	Boston U. *	2:00 PM		
Fri Feb. 11	at Vermont *	7:00 PM		
Sat Feb. 12	at Vermont *	4:00 PM		
Sat Feb. 19	at Boston College *	2:00 PM		
Sun Feb. 20	Boston College *	2:00 PM		

==== Conference record ====
WCHA school	Record
Boston College	
Boston University	
Connecticut	
Maine	
Northeastern	
Providence	
Vermont	

== Awards and honors ==
- Hockey East women's Team of the Week, (Week of October 4)
- Courtney Birchard, Runner-up: Hockey East, Pro Ambitions Rookie of the Month (October 2010)
- Lindsey Minton, Hockey East Co-Defensive Player of the Week (Week of November 1)
- Lindsey Minton, Runner-up: Hockey East Goaltender of the Month (October 2010)
- Lindsey Minton, Hockey East Defensive Player of the Week (Week of December 13, 2010)
- Arielle O’Neill, Runner-up: Hockey East, Pro Ambitions Rookie of the Month (October 2010)
- Kayley Herman, Hockey East Defensive Player of the Week (Week of February 7, 2011)

=== Team awards ===
- Karyn Bye Award (MVP)- Courtney Birchard
- Colleen Coyne Award (best defenseman)- Courtney Sheary
- Tricia Dunn Award (best defensive forward)- Nicole Gifford
- Rookie of the Year- Nicole Gifford, Arielle O'Neill
- Sue Merz Award (7th Player)- Raylen Dziengelewski
- Fan Favorite Award- Emma Clark
- Unsung Hero Award- Kristine Horn
- Academic Award for Excellence- Katie Brock
- A. Barr "Whoop" Snively Citizenship & Service Award- Kayley Herman
- Norma O'Dowd Hartnett Award (sportsmanship)- Chelsea Risling
