= Molly Schaus =

American ice hockey goaltender and coach

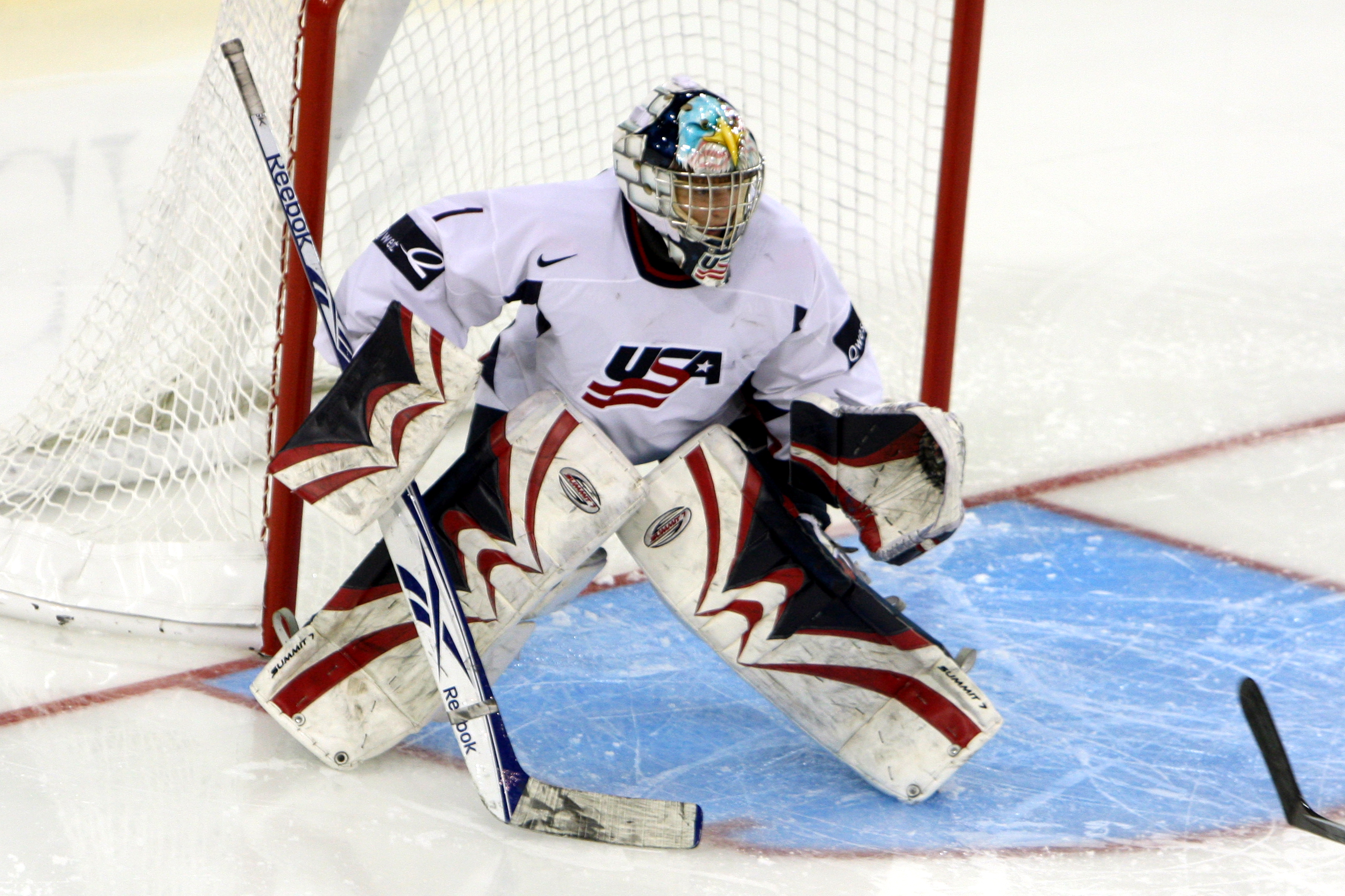
- Born: July 29, 1988 (age 38) Voorhees, New Jersey, US
- Height: 5 ft 9 in (175 cm)
- Weight: 157 lb (71 kg; 11 st 3 lb)
- Position: Goaltender
- Shot: Left
- Played for: Boston Blades; Boston College
- Coached for: United States U18; UMass Boston Beacons
- National team: United States
- Playing career: 2006–2015
- Coaching career: 2011–present
Medal record
Olympic Games
Silver medal – second place	2010 Vancouver	Team
Silver medal – second place	2014 Sochi	Team
World Championship
Gold medal – first place	2008 China
Gold medal – first place	2009 Finland
Gold medal – first place	2011 Switzerland
Gold medal – first place	2015 Sweden
Silver medal – second place	2012 United States

Molly Patricia Schaus (born July 29, 1988) is an American retired ice hockey goaltender and coach. As a member of the United States women's national ice hockey team, she was a two-time Olympic medalist and five-time World Championship medalist. She was drafted 2nd overall by the Boston Blades in the 2011 CWHL Draft.

== Early life ==
Schaus was born in Voorhees, New Jersey and shortly after moved to the Minneapolis, Minnesota. There she learned to skate on the back yard pond with her older brothers. At age 7 she and her family relocated to Naperville, Illinois and began her early years of formal hockey with the Naperville Sabres and Team Illinois. After watching Team USA take home the gold medal in 1998, the first Olympic Games to include women's hockey, Schaus became hooked. She again relocated after her freshman year in high school (Benet Academy of Lisle, Illinois) to Natick, Massachusetts. Playing for both Deerfield Academy and Assabet Valley during her high school years, she was recruited to play hockey at Boston College. After taking a leave of absence after her junior year to compete in the 2010 Olympics, she returned to Boston College to finish her senior year. Schaus graduated from the Lynch School of Education with a degree in Human Development and a minor in Biology.

== Playing career ==
=== NCAA ===
At the conclusion of the 2010–11 regular season, Schaus is ranked third in the NCAA in goals against average (1.42), fifth in save percentage (.941) sixth in winning percentage (.793), and tied for 11th in shutouts (4). She leads Hockey East in goals against average and save percentage and is second in winning percentage. On January 30, 2011, Schaus earned her first career assist in a 2–1 defeat of Northeastern. She stopped a slapshot which rebounded to Kelli Stack. Stack skated the length of the rink and scored a shorthanded goal, which was also the game winner.

Schaus received the Bertagna Goaltending Award (given to the Beanpot tournament outstanding goalie) for the third time in her career following BC's win in the Beanpot Championship, the third Schaus has been a part of during her four years at the Heights.

Molly Schaus was among 10 finalists nominated for the 2011 Patty Kazmaier Memorial Award, presented by Lake Erie College of Osteopathic Medicine. An award of The USA Hockey Foundation, the Patty Kazmaier Memorial Award is annually bestowed upon the top player in NCAA Division I women's ice hockey. Schaus was nominated for the award in 2009, advancing to become a finalist.

Molly Schaus earned American Hockey Coaches Association All-America honors for 2011 in capturing first-team honors. Schaus received All-America second-team recognition as a junior in 2008–09.

At Boston College for the 2010–2011 season, Schaus topped her own school wins record this season by going 24–5–4. She was selected as the All-America First Team goaltender. The senior boasted a save percentage of .942 and 1.45 goals against average to help guide BC to the Frozen Four. Schaus ended her tenure as an Eagle with numerous school records, including saves (3,428), GAA (1.81) and wins (80).

=== USA Hockey ===
In Vancouver, Schaus did not play in the 2–0 loss in the final to Team Canada, and along with her teammates, brought home a silver medal. She was in the goal and unscored upon for 52 minutes in the opening game, a 12–1 blowout of China, with Vice President Joe Biden and 1980 "Miracle on Ice" men's hockey gold medalist and captain Mike Eruzione together in the stands. In the gold medal game of the 2010 Four Nations Cup, Molly Schaus faced 52 shots, including 20 in a scoreless third period. In overtime, Schaus faced 11 shots. In the fourth game of the 2011 IIHF 12 Nations Tournament, Schaus earned a shutout in a 4–0 defeat of Canada.

== Awards and honors ==
=== USA Hockey ===
Two-time member of the U.S. Women's National Team for the International Ice Hockey Federation World Women's Championship (gold-2008-09) ... Member of the U.S. Women's Select Team for the 2008 Four Nations Cup (1st) ... Two-time member of the U.S. Women's Under-22 Select Team for the Under-22 Series with Canada (2007–08) ... Three-time USA Hockey Women's National Festival participant (2007–09) ... Five-time USA Hockey Player Development Camp attendee (2002–06).

=== College ===
As a Junior (2008–09): Completed her third season at Boston College of Hockey East ... Recorded an NCAA second-best .938 save percentage ... Ranked second in the nation with 10 shutouts ... Top-10 finalist for the Patty Kazmaier Memorial Award ... Named Hockey East First Team All-Star and earned a spot on the Hockey East All-Tournament Team ... Named to Hockey East's All-Academic Team. As a Sophomore (2007–08): Broke the school's single-season record with 920 saves ... Named to Hockey East's All-Academic Team. As a Freshman (2006–07): Led team to its first-ever NCAA Women's Frozen Four berth ... Posted a league-best .931 save percentage and school-record 1.90 GAA ... Stopped 73 shots on Feb. 6 in the Beanpot semifinal against Harvard to break the previous NCAA record of 70 and earn the Beanpot's Bertagna Award ... Made 45 and 47 saves against Dartmouth College and the University of Minnesota Duluth in back-to-back double overtime NCAA tournament games ... Hockey East Second Team All-Star selection ... Unanimous selection to the Hockey East All-Rookie Team ... Earned the Athletic Director's Award for Academic Achievement ... BC's Scholar-Athlete Award recipient .... Named to Hockey East's All-Academic Team.

- 2009 Patty Kazmaier Award nominee
- 2011 Patty Kazmaier Award nominee
- 2011 Bertagna Goaltending Award
- 2011 All-Hockey East First Team
- 2011 First Team All-America selection
- 2010–11 New England Women's Division I All-Stars
- Hockey East 10th Anniversary Team selection

== Career statistics ==
Year	Team	Event	Result	GP	W	L	T/OT	MIN	GA	SO	GAA	SV%
2010	USA	OG	2nd place, silver medalist(s)	1	1	0	0	52:00	0	1	0.00	1.000
2014	USA	OG	2nd place, silver medalist(s)	1	1	0	0	60:00	0	1	0.00	1.000
