= 2011 CWHL Draft =

General information
- Date: July 21, 2011
- Location: Mississauga, Ontario

Overview
- First selection: Meghan Agosta

The 2011 CWHL Draft was held on July 21, 2011 in Mississauga. The Montreal Stars had the first pick overall and selected Meghan Agosta from Mercyhurst College.

== Top 50 picks ==
#	Player	Hometown	Team	College
1	Meghan Agosta (F)	(Canada) Ruthven, Ontario	Montreal	Mercyhurst Lakers (CHA)
2	Molly Schaus (G)	(United States) Naperville, Illinois	Boston	Boston College Eagles (HEA)
3	Meaghan Mikkelson (D)	(Canada) St. Albert, Alberta	Alberta	Wisconsin Badgers (WCHA)
4	Vicki Bendus (F)	(Canada) Wasaga Beach, Ontario	Brampton	Mercyhurst Lakers (CHA)
5	Jesse Scanzano (F)	(Canada) Montreal, Quebec	Toronto	Mercyhurst Lakers (CHA)
6	Courtney Birchard (F)	(Canada) Mississauga, Ontario	Brampton	New Hampshire Wildcats (ECAC East)
7	Catherine Ward (D)	(Canada) Montreal, Quebec	Montreal	Boston University Terriers (HEA)
8	Meghan Duggan (F)	(United States) Danvers, Massachusetts	Boston	Wisconsin Badgers (WCHA)
9	Bobbi-Jo Slusar (D)	(Canada) Swift Current, Saskatchewan	Alberta	Wisconsin Badgers (WCHA)
10	Sommer West (F)	(Canada) Bowmanville, Ontario	Burlington	Durham Lords (OCAA)
11	Mallory Deluce (F)	(Canada) London, Ontario	Toronto	Wisconsin Badgers (WCHA)
12	Tara Gray (D)	(Canada) Toronto, Ontario	Brampton	Minnesota Duluth Bulldogs (WCHA)
13	Caroline Hill (F)	(Canada) Dorval, Quebec	Montreal	McGill Martlets (QSSF)
14	Kelli Stack (F)	(United States) Brooklyn Heights, Ohio	Boston	Boston College Eagles (HEA)
15	Keely Brown (G)	(Canada) Edmonton, Alberta	Alberta	Toronto Lady Blues (OUA)
16	Sara Dagg (F)	(Canada) St. George, Ontario	Burlington	RIT Tigers (ECAC West)
17	Melissa Lacroix (D)	(Canada) Penetanguishene, Ontario	Toronto	Mercyhurst Lakers (CHA)
18	Liz Knox (G)	(Canada) Stouffville, Ontario	Brampton	Laurier Golden Hawks (OUA)
19	Catherine Herron (G)	(Canada) Chambly, Quebec	Montreal	Montreal Carabins (QSSF)
20	Jessica Vetter (G)	(United States) Cottage Grove, Wisconsin	Boston	Wisconsin Badgers (WCHA)
21	Jill MacIsaac (G)	(Canada) Timberlea, Nova Scotia	Alberta	Saint Mary's Huskies (AUS)
22	Beth Clause (G)	(Canada) Hamilton, Ontario	Burlington	Brock Badgers (OUA)
23	Katie Stack (F)	(United States) Batavia, New York	Toronto	RIT Tigers (ECAC West)
24	Sonia Vanderbliek (G)	(Canada) Toronto, Ontario	Brampton	RPI Engineers (ECAC Hockey)
25	Catherine Desjardins (D)	(Canada) Varennes, Quebec	Montreal	Concordia Stingers (QSSF)
26	Sasha Sherry (D)	(United States) Lehighton, Pennsylvania	Boston	Princeton Tigers (ECAC Hockey)
27	Courtney Sawchuk (D)	(Canada) Sherwood Park, Alberta	Alberta	St. Lawrence Skating Saints (ECAC Hockey)
28	Lori Antflick (F)	(Canada) Thornhill, Ontario	Burlington	Northeastern Huskies (HEA)
29	Margaret Gerber (D)	Uppsala, Sweden	Toronto	University of British Columbia Thunderbirds (CWUAA)
30	Britney Selina (F)	(Canada) Thornhill, Ontario	Brampton	Clarkson Golden Knights (ECAC Hockey)
31	Alyssa Cecere (F)	(Canada) Brossard, Quebec	Montreal	McGill Martlets (QSSF)
32	Katherine Buesser (F)	(United States) Wolfeboro, New Hampshire	Boston	Harvard Crimson (ECAC Hockey)
33	Colleen Olsen (F)	(Canada) Sherwood Park, Alberta	Alberta	Ohio State Buckeyes (WCHA)
34	Sara Lynch (D)	(Canada) Owen Sound, Ontario	Burlington	Western Mustangs (OUA)
35	Amy Jack (F)	(Canada) Cheltenham, Ontario	Toronto	Niagara Purple Eagles (CHA)
36	Anniina Rajahuhta (F)	Helsinki, Finland	Burlington	None (played on Finland women's national ice hockey team)
37	Audrey Doyon-Lessard (G)	(Canada) Charny, Quebec	Montreal	Concordia Stingers (QSSF)
38	Jillian Kirchner (F)	(United States) Frankfort, Illinois	Boston	Boston University Terriers (HEA)
39	Jill Kern		Alberta	
40	Jo Anne Eustace (F)	(Canada) Torbay, Newfoundland	Burlington	Minnesota Duluth Bulldogs (WCHA)
41	Elizabeth Kench (F)	(Canada) Gananoque, Ontario	Toronto	Queen's Golden Gaels (OUA)
42	Amanda Stuntz		Brampton	
43	Danielle Wilkinson-Ford		Montreal	None (played in DWHL)
44	Jackee Snikeris (G)	(United States) Downingtown, Pennsylvania	Boston	Yale Bulldogs (ECAC Hockey)
45	Brittaney Maschmeyer (D)	(Canada) Bruderheim, Alberta	Alberta	St. Lawrence Skating Saints (ECAC Hockey)
46	Nicole Hishon (D)		Burlington	
47	Marissa McMullan (F)	(Canada) Haileybury, Ontario	Toronto	Buffalo State Bengals (ECAC West)
48	Megan Carty		Brampton	
49	Sabrine Nault		Montreal	None (played for Les Ailes de Richelieu)
50	Bray Ketchum (F)	(United States) Greenwich, Connecticut	Boston	Yale Bulldogs (ECAC Hockey)

== Draft picks by team ==
= Indicates Olympian

= Indicates former NCAA player

= Indicates former CIS player

=== Alberta ===
#	Player	Hometown	College
3	Meaghan Mikkelson (D)	(Canada) St. Albert, Alberta	Wisconsin Badgers (WCHA)
9	Bobbi-Jo Slusar (D)	(Canada) Swift Current, Saskatchewan	Wisconsin Badgers (WCHA)
15	Keely Brown (G)	(Canada) Edmonton, Alberta	Toronto Lady Blues (OUA)
21	Jill MacIsaac (G)	(Canada) Timberlea, Nova Scotia	Saint Mary's Huskies (AUS)
27	Courtney Sawchuk (D)	(Canada) Sherwood Park, Alberta	St. Lawrence Skating Saints (ECAC Hockey)
33	Colleen Olsen (F)	(Canada) Sherwood Park, Alberta	Ohio State Buckeyes (WCHA)
39	Jill Kern		
45	Brittaney Maschmeyer (D)	(Canada) Bruderheim, Alberta	St. Lawrence Skating Saints (ECAC Hockey)
51	Kaley Hall-Herman (F)	(Canada) Calgary, Alberta	None (claimed from Strathmore Rockies)
62	Sam Hunt (F)	(Canada) Calgary, Alberta	Colgate Raiders (ECAC Hockey)
64	Kelsey Webster (D)	(Canada) Duncan, British Columbia	York Lions (OUA)
66	Karlee Overguard (F)	(Canada) Sundre, Alberta	Cornell Big Red (ECAC Hockey)
68	Katie Stewart (F)	(Canada) Exeter, Ontario	Cornell Big Red (ECAC Hockey)
70	Jenna Cunningham (F)	(Canada) Medicine Hat, Alberta	Dartmouth Big Green (ECAC Hockey)
72	Amber Overguard (F)	(Canada) Sundre, Alberta	Cornell Big Red (ECAC Hockey)
74	Erin Duggan (D)	(Canada) Beaumont, Alberta	Yale Bulldogs (ECAC Hockey)
76	Dana Vinge (G)	(Canada) Edmonton, Alberta	Alberta Pandas (CWUAA)
78	Ashley Cockell (F)	(Canada) Fort Assiniboine, Alberta	Mercyhurst Lakers (CHA)
80	Carrie Olsen (D)	(Canada) Calgary, Alberta	Red Deer Queens (ACAC)
82	Taryn Peacock (F)	(Canada) Calgary, Alberta	Maine Black Bears (HEA)
84	Larissa Roche (F)	(Canada) Thorhild, Alberta	Dartmouth Big Green (ECAC Hockey)
85	Kelsey MacMillan (F)	(Canada) Sherwood Park, Alberta	NAIT Ooks (ACAC)
86	Lundy Day (G)	(Canada) Calgary, Alberta	Union Dutchwomen (ECAC Hockey)
87	Mia Mucci (F)	(Canada) Canmore, Alberta	Alberta Pandas (CWUAA)
88	Amanda Nonis (F)	(Canada) Brampton, Ontario	Manhattanville Valiants (ECAC East)
89	Kendra Chisholm (G)	(Canada) Sherwood Park, Alberta	Neumann Knights (ECAC West)
90	Tara Swanson (D)	(Canada) Wetaskiwin, Alberta	Grant MacEwan Griffins (ACAC)
91	Becky Irvine (F)	(Canada) Lakeview, Nova Scotia	Colgate Raiders (ECAC Hockey)
92	Seyara Shwetz (D)	(Canada) Waskatenau, Alberta	Saint Mary's Huskies (AUS)
93	Kaley Herman (G)	(Canada) Weyburn, Saskatchewan	New Hampshire Wildcats (ECAC East)
94	Nicole Symington (F)	(Canada) Burlington, Ontario	Yale Bulldogs (ECAC Hockey)
95	Carli Clemis (G)	(Canada) Taber, Alberta	Dartmouth Big Green (ECAC Hockey)
96	Amanda Squire (G)	(Canada) Comox, British Columbia	Mount Royal Cougars (ACAC)
97	Jennifer Moe (F)	(Canada) Bonnyville, Alberta	Calgary Dinos (CWUAA)
98	Lindsay Robinson (F)	(Canada) Edmonton, Alberta	Alberta Pandas (CWUAA)
99	Kristin Miyauchi (F)	(Canada) Calgary, Alberta	SAIT Trojans (ACAC)
100	Lauren Chiswell (F)	(Canada) Edmonton, Alberta	Grant MacEwan Griffins (ACAC)
101	Kristen Sugiyama (G)	(Canada) Edmonton, Alberta	Grant MacEwen Griffins (ACAC)
102	Laura Dostaler (F)	(Canada) Beaumont, Alberta	None (claimed from Edmonton Chimos)
103	Danielle MacDougall (F)	(Canada) Sherwood Park, Alberta	Saint Mary's Huskies (AUS)
104	Kelly Godel (F)	(Canada) Hythe, Alberta	Alberta Pandas (CWUAA)
105	Jill Barber (F)	(Canada) Irma, Alberta	Grant MacEwan Griffins (ACAC)
106	Danielle Boyce (F)	(Canada) Summerside, Prince Edward Island	Calgary Dinos (CWUAA)
107	Kendal Jurista (F)	(Canada) Kamloops, British Columbia	NAIT Ooks (ACAC)
108	Bret Seaton (F)	(Canada) Brooks, Alberta	SAIT Trojans (ACAC)
109	Georgia Moore (F)	Melbourne, Australia	SAIT Trojans (ACAC)
110	Alanna McMullen (D)	(Canada) Calgary, Alberta	Buffalo State Bengals (ECAC West)
111	Christina Ashley	(Canada) Stirling, Ontario	Mount Allison Mounties (AUS)
112	Jenna Ouellette (F)	(Canada) Winnipeg, Manitoba	Maine Black Bears (HEA)

=== Boston ===
#	Player	Hometown	College
2	Molly Schaus (G)	(United States) Naperville, Illinois	Boston College Eagles (HEA)
8	Meghan Duggan (F)	(United States) Danvers, Massachusetts	Wisconsin Badgers (WCHA)
14	Kelli Stack (F)	(United States) Brooklyn Heights, Ohio	Boston College Eagles (HEA)
20	Jessica Vetter (G)	(United States) Cottage Grove, Wisconsin	Wisconsin Badgers (WCHA)
26	Sasha Sherry (D)	(United States) Lehighton, Pennsylvania	Princeton Tigers (ECAC Hockey)
32	Katherine Buesser (F)	(United States) Wolfeboro, New Hampshire	Harvard Crimson (ECAC Hockey)
38	Jillian Kirchner (F)	(United States) Frankfort, Illinois	Boston University Terriers (HEA)
44	Jackee Snikeris (G)	(United States) Downingtown, Pennsylvania	Yale Bulldogs (ECAC Hockey)
50	Bray Ketchum (F)	(United States) Greenwich, Connecticut	Yale Bulldogs (ECAC Hockey)
63	Whitney Naslund (F)	(United States) Bloomington, Minnesota	RPI Engineers (ECAC Hockey)
65	Courtney Sheary (D)	(United States) Melrose, Massachusetts	New Hampshire Wildcats (ECAC East)
67	Katelyn Kurth (D)	(United States) High Bridge, New Jersey	Boson College Eagles (HEA)
69	Kristi Kehoe (F)	(United States) Bakersfield, California	Northeastern Huskies (HEA)
71	Alyssa Wohlfeiler (F)	(United States) Saugus, California	Northeastern Huskies (HEA)
73	Erica Kromm (F)	(Canada) Naramata, British Columbia	Brown Bears (ECAC Hockey)
75	Mandy Mackrell (G)	(United States) Cleveland, Ohio	Plattsburgh Cardinals (ECAC West)
77	Kimberly Weiss (F)	(United States) Potomac, Maryland	Trinity College Bantams (NESCAC)
79	Lisa Weiss		
81	Jenni Poulin (F)	(United States) Pembroke, New Hampshire	New England Nor'Easters (NESCAC)
83	Shelley Payne (G)	(United States) Santa Barbara, California	Colby White Mules (NESCAC)

=== Brampton ===
#	Player	Hometown	College
4	Vicki Bendus (F)	(Canada) Wasaga Beach, Ontario	Mercyhurst Lakers (CHA)
6	Courtney Birchard (F)	(Canada) Mississauga, Ontario	New Hampshire Wildcats (ECAC East)
12	Tara Gray (D)	(Canada) Toronto, Ontario	Minnesota Duluth Bulldogs (WCHA)
18	Liz Knox (G)	(Canada) Stouffville, Ontario	Laurier Golden Hawks (OUA)
24	Sonia Vanderbliek (G)	(Canada) Toronto, Ontario	RPI Engineers (ECAC Hockey)
30	Britney Selina (F)	(Canada) Thornhill, Ontario	Clarkson Golden Knights (ECAC Hockey)
42	Amanda Stuntz		
48	Megan Carty		

=== Burlington ===
#	Player	Hometown	College
10	Sommer West (F)	(Canada) Bowmanville, Ontario	Durham Lords (OCAA)
16	Sara Dagg (F)	(Canada) St. George, Ontario	RIT Tigers (ECAC West)
22	Beth Clause (G)	(Canada) Hamilton, Ontario	Brock Badgers (OUA)
28	Lori Antflick (F)	(Canada) Thornhill, Ontario	Northeastern Huskies (HEA)
34	Sara Lynch (D)	(Canada) Owen Sound, Ontario	Western Mustangs (OUA)
36	Anniina Rajahuhta (F)	Helsinki, Finland	None (played on Finland women's national ice hockey team)
40	Jo Anne Eustace (F)	(Canada) Torbay, Newfoundland	Minnesota Duluth Bulldogs (WCHA)
46	Nicole Hishon (D)		
52	Melissa Boufounos (F)	(Canada) Bolton, Ontario	Centennial Colts (OCAA)
57	Samantha Agius (F)	(Canada) Toronto, Ontario	Toronto Centurians (Golden Blades Hockey League)

=== Montreal ===
#	Player	Hometown	College
1	Meghan Agosta (F)	(Canada) Ruthven, Ontario	Mercyhurst Lakers (CHA)
7	Catherine Ward (D)	(Canada) Montreal, Quebec	Boston University Terriers (HEA)
13	Caroline Hill (F)	(Canada) Dorval, Quebec	McGill Martlets (QSSF)
19	Catherine Herron (G)	(Canada) Chambly, Quebec	Montreal Carabins (QSSF)
25	Catherine Desjardins (D)	(Canada) Varennes, Quebec	Concordia Stingers (QSSF)
31	Alyssa Cecere (F)	(Canada) Brossard, Quebec	McGill Martlets (QSSF)
37	Audrey Doyon-Lessard (G)	(Canada) Charny, Quebec	Concordia Stingers (QSSF)
43	Danielle Wilkinson-Ford		None (played in DWHL)
49	Sabrine Nault		None (played for Les Ailes de Richelieu)

=== Toronto ===
#	Player	Hometown	College
5	Jesse Scanzano (F)	(Canada) Montreal, Quebec	Mercyhurst Lakers (CHA)
11	Mallory Deluce (F)	(Canada) London, Ontario	Wisconsin Badgers (WCHA)
17	Melissa Lacroix (D)	(Canada) Penetanguishene, Ontario	Mercyhurst Lakers (CHA)
23	Katie Stack (F)	(United States) Batavia, New York	RIT Tigers (ECAC West)
29	Margaret Gerber	Uppsala, Sweden	University of British Columbia Thunderbirds (CWUAA)
35	Amy Jack (F)	(Canada) Cheltenham, Ontario	Niagara Purple Eagles (CHA)
41	Elizabeth Kench (F)	(Canada) Gananoque, Ontario	Queen's Golden Gaels (OUA)
47	Marissa McMullan (F)	(Canada) Haileybury, Ontario	Buffalo State Bengals (ECAC West)

== Transactions ==
July 21, 2011	To Brampton Thunder 4th overall draft pick - Ashley Riggs	To Burlington Barracudas Delaney Collins - Mandy Cole
