= 2010–11 Connecticut Huskies women's ice hockey season =

- Conference: ECAC
- Home ice: Mark Edward Freitas Ice Forum

Rankings
- USA Today/USA Hockey Magazine: Not ranked
- USCHO.com/CBS College Sports: Not ranked

Record
- Overall: 7–10–1

Coaches and captains
- Head coach: Heather Linstad
- Captain: Jody Sydor
- Alternate captain(s): Jennifer Chaisson, Brittany Murphy

These are the highlights of the 2010–2011 Connecticut Huskies women's ice hockey season.

== Offseason ==
- June 2, 2010: The University of Connecticut men's and women's ice hockey teams played outdoor games at Rentschler Field on Sunday, Feb. 13. This event was part of the "Whalers Hockey Fest". The UConn men's also took on Sacred Heart. The women's team then faced the Providence Friars women's ice hockey program in a Hockey East game.

== Regular season ==
- October 23–24: With their series against Minnesota Duluth, the Huskies have now faced all of the previous national champions in regular season play. Alexandra Garcia posted a career-high 41 saves against the Bulldogs on Saturday. The following day, Garcia had 35 saves. She has now recorded 30 + saves in four games this season. In addition, she became the fourth Husky to record 1,000 saves in a career.
- November 13–14: Kelly Horan had game winning goals in both games versus New Hampshire. She ended the weekend with a +1 rating and three shots on net. Huskies goalie Alexandra Garcia recorded her first shutout of the season on November 13 in a 1–0 victory. She made 32 saves to earn the shutout. The following day, she allowed just one goal and finished the two-game series versus New Hampshire with a 0.50 GAA and a .983 save percentage. The 1–0 shutout ended the Huskies 17-game unbeaten streak against the Huskies. The Huskies penalty kill was a perfect 6-of-6 on the weekend. The shutout on November 13 marked the first time the Wildcats were shut out at home since Nov. 28, 2004 (by Mercyhurst), a streak of 109 consecutive home games.
- Alexandra Garcia recorded 139 saves during November 2010. She notched a 4–1–0 record with a 1.22 GAA and a .959 save percentage. During 295:45 minutes of play, she accumulated two shutouts, one at New Hampshire and one at Vermont. In all six games, Garcia tallied at least 25 saves. In the six games, her save percentage was .950 or better. Garcia was named the WHEA Defensive Player of the Week following the UNH series on Nov. 15th.
- On January 15 and 16, 2011, Garcia recorded 56 saves in a two-game series against Vermont. In addition, she posted back-to-back shutouts against the Catamounts, including 35 on January 15
- Garcia recorded a .982 save percentage on January 19 and 20, while posting 54 saves and allowing just one goal. She posted her fifth shutout of the season on the 19th with a 31 save performance.
- February 13: The Providence Friars earned a 4–3 victory over the Connecticut Huskies. The match was part of Whaler's Hockey Fest, and was played outdoors at Rentschler Field.
- May 9: Sami Evelyn was named the Huskies Most Valuable Player. She scored five goals and a team-high 14 assists for 19 points (all career highs). She led all Huskies defenders in scoring, while placing third overall in team scoring. Her 0.54 points per game ranked fourth among Hockey East defenders. She also ranked third in conference games (0.52 points per game).

=== Standings ===
2010–11 Hockey East Association standings
	Overall							Conference					
	GP	W	L	T	PTS	GF	GA	GP	W	L	T	GF	GA
#4 Boston University†	32	28	4	4	60	117	56	21	15	3	3	66	33
#7 Boston College*	31	20	6	5	45	92	56	21	13	4	4	55	32
#9 Providence	35	22	12	1	45	53	43	21	12	8	1	53	43
Connecticut	18	7	10	1	15	35	51	21	9	9	3	36	39
Northeastern	18	10	4	4	24	48	35	21	6	10	5	42	48
Maine	19	8	7	4	19	54	42	21	6	12	3	37	54
New Hampshire	19	9	10	0	18	33	40	21	7	13	1	35	50
Vermont	33	7	17	9	23	44	77	21	4	13	4	24	49
Championship: Boston College † indicates conference regular season champion * indicates conference tournament champion Current rankings: USCHO.com Division I women's poll

*Rankings based on number of wins in the conference

== Awards and honors ==
- Alexandra Garcia, Connecticut, Hockey East Pure Hockey Defensive Player of the Week, (Week of November 15)
- Alexandra Garcia, Hockey East Goaltender of the Month, November 2010
- Alexandra Garcia, Hockey East Defensive Player of the Week (Week of January 17, 2011)
- Alexandra Garcia, Hockey East Goaltender of the Week (Week of January 24, 2011)
- Taylor Gross, Hockey East Rookie of the Week (Week of February 7, 2011)
- Taylor Gross, Runner-Up, Hockey East Rookie of the Month (November 2010)
- Kelly Horan, Connecticut, Hockey East Pure Hockey Player of the Week, (Week of November 15)
- Stephanie Raithby, Hockey East Rookie of the Week (Week of February 14, 2011)
- Connecticut, Hockey East Team of the Week, (Week of November 15)

=== Postseason ===
- Alexandra Garica, 2011 Hockey East Player of the Year runner-up
- Alexandra Garica, 2011 Hockey East Second Team All-Star
- Sami Evelyn, Hockey East Second Team All-Star honors

=== Team honors ===
- 2Jennifer Chiasson, Patti Babcock Award (ro acknowledge outstanding dedication and loyalty to the women's ice hockey program)
- Sami Evelyn, Team MVP
- Taylor Gross, Rookie of the Year
- Kelly Horan, Unsung Hero
- Stephanie Raithby, Most Improved Player honors
