= Catherine Herron =

Canadian ice hockey player

- Born: 24 June 1983 (age 43) Chambly, Québec, Canada
- Height: 173 cm (5 ft 8 in)
- Weight: 75 kg (165 lb; 11 st 11 lb)
- Position: Goalie
- Caught: Left
- CWHL team Former teams: Les Canadiennes de Montreal: Montreal Stars (CWHL); Montreal Carabins (CIAU); McGill Martlets (CIAU)
- Playing career: 2002–present

Catherine Herron (born 24 June 1983) is a Canadian ice hockey goalie and coach.

== Biography ==
=== Early life ===
Catherine Herron started playing hockey at the age of 8, encouraged by her uncle, Denis Herron, a goalie who played for the Montreal Canadiens, Pittsburgh Penguins and Kansas City Scouts. She played on boys' teams until the age of 14.

=== Playing career ===
Herron played 2 seasons (2002–03 and 2003–04) for the St. Lawrence College Patriots in the AA College Women's Hockey League then 4 years with the McGill University Martlets in the Canadian University Championship. In 2009–10, Herron was the first goalkeeper on the inaugural women's hockey team of the University of Montreal Carabins. She played 15 games with a 2.95 average and a .904 save average. She helped the Carabins to finish second in their division, earning a position in the playoffs at the end of the season.

Herron began playing for the Montreal Stars in the 2010–11 season of the Canadian Women's Hockey League (CWHL). Herron was substitute goalkeeper and played 3 games for the Stars with an average save of 0.941. In her second season (2011–12) she defended the Stars' net in 4 games, averaging 2.27.

=== Coaching career ===
In the 2015–16 season, Herron coached the goalkeepers of the St. Lawrence College Patriots.

== Honours and distinctions ==
- 2-time Clarkson Cup Champion (2011 and 2012)
- 2 regular-season championships in the CWHL (2010–11) and (2011–12).
- In 2009–10 she earned the title of Player of the Year of the Carabins of the University of Montreal
- In 2004–2005 she was named to the Canadian University Championship Rookie Team as she played with the McGill Martlets.
- In 2003–2004 she was voted the RSEQ's player of the year and on the first team of college stars while playing for the St. Lawrence College Patriots.
