= 2010–11 Vermont Catamounts women's ice hockey season =

Did not qualify,
- Conference: 8 Hockey East
- Home ice: Gutterson Fieldhouse

Rankings
- USA Today/USA Hockey Magazine: Not ranked
- USCHO.com/CBS College Sports: Not ranked

Record
- Overall: 7-17-9

Coaches and captains
- Head coach: Tim Bothwell
- Captain: Celeste Doucet

The 2010–11 Vermont Catamounts season was their sixth in Hockey East. Led by head coach Tim Bothwell, the Catamounts were unable to qualify for the NCAA hockey tournament. Of note, Roxanne Douville, who was a projected to be a top 10 CWHL draft pick, became only the second Vermont player to be named to the Hockey East All-Rookie Team.

== Exhibition ==
Date	Opponent	Score	Goal scorers
Oct. 2	McGill	Tie, 2-2	Emily Walsh, Celeste Doucet

== Regular season ==
- Saturday October 16 marked seniors Peggy Wakeham and Jul Sifers 100th career game at Vermont
- October 22: Vermont defeated Yale for the first time as a Division I program.
- Roxanne Douville stopped 43 saves on Friday earning her a 1–1 tie at Northeastern. She recorded 18 stops in the opening frame vs. the Huskies and tallied 15 saves in the third period to help the Catamounts earn a point in the WHEA standings.
- Through October 31, Peggy Wakeham extended her goal scoring streak to four games.
- November 7–8: Roxanne Douville stopped 59 of 63 shots for a .937 save percentage in road games versus New Hampshire and No. 6 Boston College. She recorded 35 saves on Sunday vs. the Eagles at Conte Forum, including six in the extra frame.
- November 12–13: Roxanne Douville stopped 63 of the 66 shots (.955 save%) she faced this weekend on the road earning consecutive ties against fifth ranked Boston University at Walter Brown Arena. She notched 33 stops on Friday and totaled 30 saves on Saturday.
- Roxanne Douville led the Catamounts to a 0–3–4 record in the month of November. She registered a 1.64 GAA and .943 save percentage. During the month, she had 200 saves and recorded 30+ saves four times in the month. On November 27, Douville had a 42-save effort. For her efforts, she was the ECAC Pro Ambitions Rookie of the Week three times in the month.
- Heading into the Holiday Break, Vermont is 2-0-7 when scoring the first goal this season. In the first half of the season, the Catamounts have gone to overtime nine times in 18 games
- February 11: Juli Sifers (2 goals, 1 assist) and Erin Wente (1 goal, 2 assists) led the Catamounts with three points each, while goaltender Roxanne Douville made 26 saves in a 4–2 victory over New Hampshire.
- March 2: Roxanne Douville was named to the Hockey East All-Rookie Team. She became only the second Vermont player to be named to the Hockey East All-Rookie Team.

=== Standings ===
2010–11 Hockey East Association standings
	Overall							Conference					
	GP	W	L	T	PTS	GF	GA	GP	W	L	T	GF	GA
#4 Boston University†	32	28	4	4	60	117	56	21	15	3	3	66	33
#7 Boston College*	31	20	6	5	45	92	56	21	13	4	4	55	32
#9 Providence	35	22	12	1	45	53	43	21	12	8	1	53	43
Connecticut	18	7	10	1	15	35	51	21	9	9	3	36	39
Northeastern	18	10	4	4	24	48	35	21	6	10	5	42	48
Maine	19	8	7	4	19	54	42	21	6	12	3	37	54
New Hampshire	19	9	10	0	18	33	40	21	7	13	1	35	50
Vermont	33	7	17	9	23	44	77	21	4	13	4	24	49
Championship: Boston College † indicates conference regular season champion * indicates conference tournament champion Current rankings: USCHO.com Division I women's poll

*Rankings based on number of wins in the conference

=== Schedule ===
Date	Opponent	Time	Score	Record
Oct. 8	@ RPI	7:00 PM		
Oct. 9	@ RPI	4:00 PM		
Oct 15	Boston College	7:00pm		
Oct 16	Boston College	4:00pm		
Oct 22	Yale	7:00pm		
Oct 23	Yale	2:00pm		
Oct 29	at Northeastern	7:00pm		
Oct 30	at Northeastern	3:00pm		
Nov 6	at New Hampshire	5:00pm	0-2	
Nov 7	at Boston College	2:00pm	2-2	
Nov 12	at Boston Univ.	3:00pm	1-1	
Nov 13	at Boston Univ.	3:00pm	2-2	
Nov 20	Connecticut	2:00pm	0-2	
Nov 23	St. Lawrence	7:00pm	0-3	
Nov 27	at Clarkson	2:00pm	1-1	
Nov 28	at Clarkson	2:00pm		
Dec 3	Maine	7:00pm		
Dec 4	Maine	4:00pm		
Dec 29	Dartmouth	7:00pm		
Jan 1	at Union	2:00pm		
Jan 2	at Union	2:00pm		
Jan 7	North Dakota	7:00pm		
Jan 8	North Dakota	2:00pm		
Jan 14	at Connecticut	7:00pm		
Jan 15	at Connecticut	4:00pm		
Jan 22	Boston Univ.	2:00pm		
Jan 28	Northeastern	7:00pm		
Jan 30	Providence	7:00pm		
Feb 5	at Maine	2:00pm		
Feb 11	New Hampshire	7:00pm		
Feb 12	New Hampshire	4:00pm		
Feb 19	at Providence	1:00pm		
Feb 20	at Providence	1:00pm		

==== Conference record ====
WCHA school	Record
Boston College	
Boston University	
Connecticut	
Maine	
New Hampshire	
Northeastern	
Providence	

== Awards and honors ==
- Roxanne Douville, Hockey East Pro Ambitions Rookie of the Week (Week of November 1)
- Roxanne Douville, Hockey East Pro Ambitions Rookie of the Week (Week of November 8)
- Roxanne Douville, Hockey East Pro Ambitions Rookie of the Week, (Week of November 15)
- Roxanne Douville, Hockey East Co-Rookie of the Month, November 2010
- Erin Wente, Hockey East Pure Hockey Player of the Week (Week of December 4)

=== Postseason ===
- Roxanne Douville, 2010-11 Hockey East All-Rookie team
