= Florence Schelling =

Swiss ice hockey player

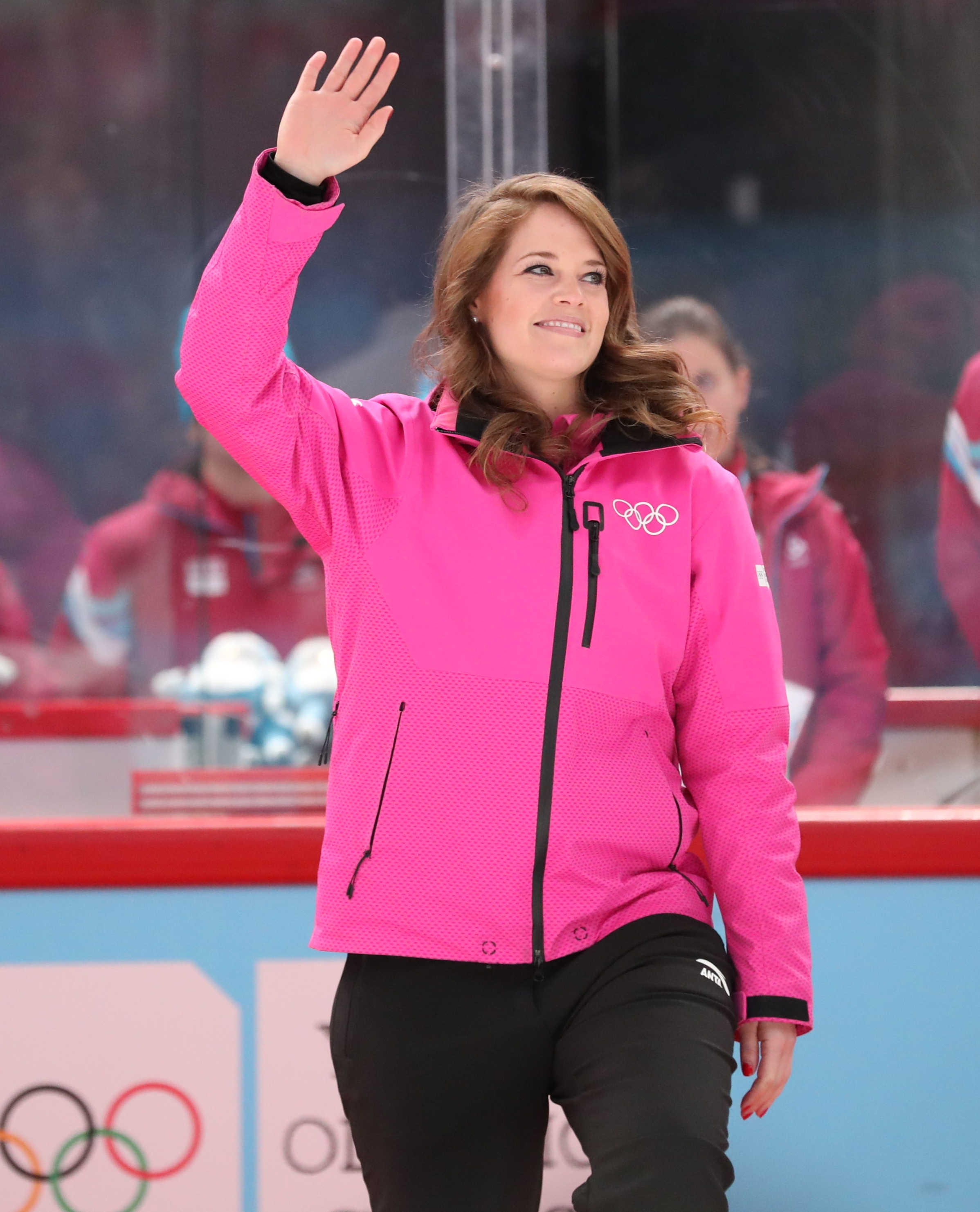
- Born: 9 March 1989 (age 37) Zürich, Switzerland
- Height: 1.75 m (5 ft 9 in)
- Weight: 68 kg (150 lb; 10 st 10 lb)
- Position: Goaltender
- Caught: Left
- Played for: Linköping HC; SC Reinach; EHC Bülach; Brampton Thunder; Northeastern Huskies; ZSC Lions; EC Illnau-Effretikon
- National team: Switzerland
- Playing career: 2005–2018
Medal record
Olympic Games
Bronze medal – third place	2014 Sochi	Tournament
World Championship
Bronze medal – third place	2012 United States

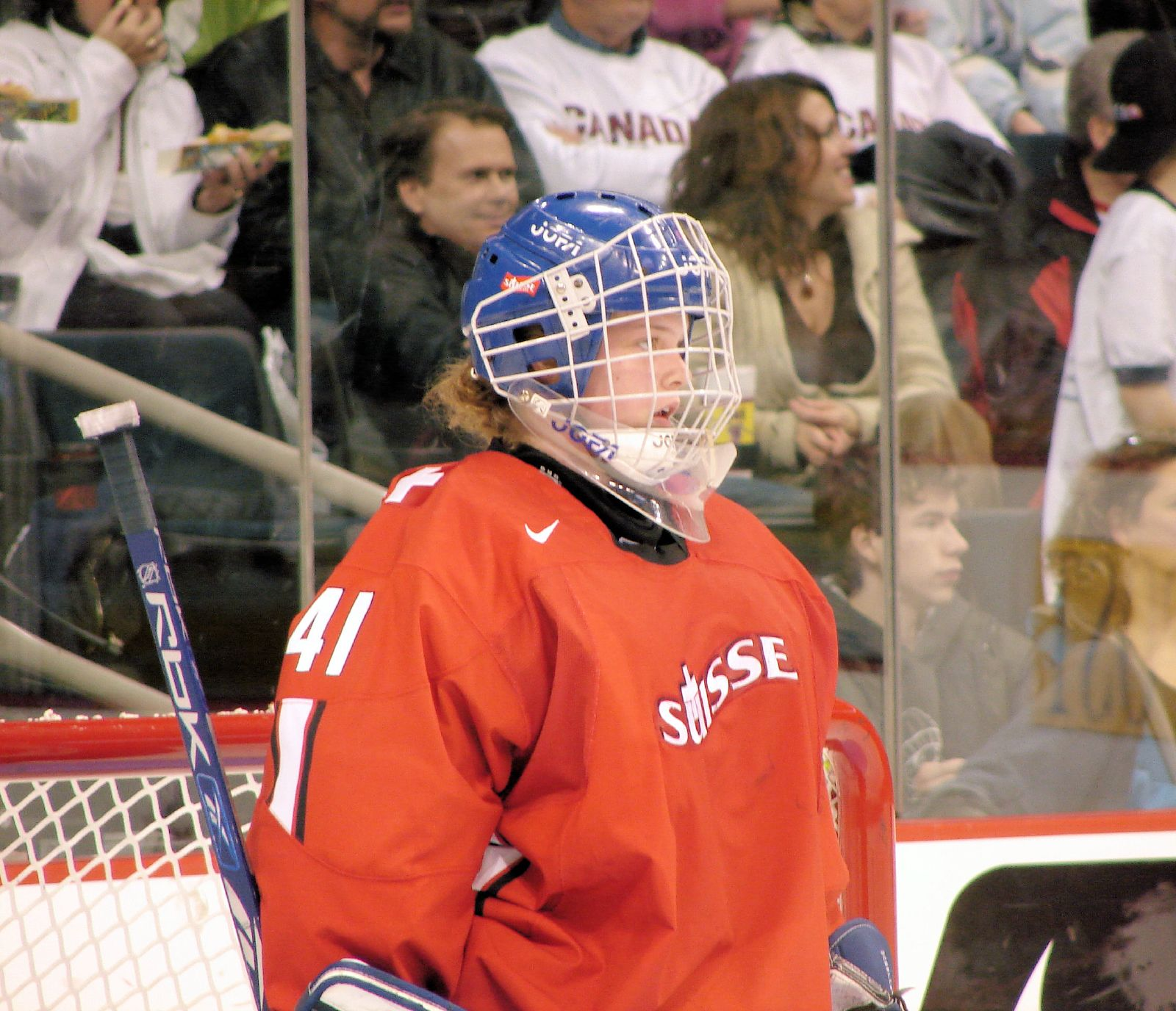
Florence Schelling in the goal of the Swiss national team

Florence Isabelle Schelling (born 9 March 1989) is a Swiss former professional ice hockey goaltender. She briefly served as general manager of SC Bern from 2020 to 2021. She was the first woman to be named GM of a professional men's team in the world. She was inducted into the IIHF Hall of Fame in 2026.

During her playing career, Schelling competed internationally with the Swiss women's national ice hockey team at the 2006 Winter Olympics, 2010 Winter Olympics and 2014 Winter Olympics. In the 2012 CWHL Draft, Schelling was selected by the Montreal Stars, but opted to play the 2012–13 season with the Brampton Thunder instead. She played with EHC Bülach of the Swiss men's National League B in the 2013–14 and 2014–15 seasons, the first and only woman to ever play in the league.

== Playing career ==
=== Switzerland ===
Schelling spent 2003–05 playing for the ZSC Lions in Switzerland. Since 2005, Schelling has been a member of the Swiss national team. Besides the Torino Olympics, she has competed in three World Championships. At the 2006 Olympic Games, Schelling was part of a seventh-place finish. Despite the showing, Schelling posted a .939 save percentage and a 2.40 goals against average in three games. In 2008, she led the Swiss to a fourth-place finish at the IIHF Women's World Hockey Championships, the team's highest ever, and was the second-ranked goalie in the tournament. At the tournament, she was the only goalie to play in every minute of every game including an overtime period and a shootout. In the bronze medal game, she made 34 saves in the loss to Finland. At the 2010 Olympic Winter Games in Vancouver, she played against Sweden and lost 3–0, lost to Canada 10–1, then beat Slovakia 5–2, China 6–0, and Russia 2–1, as the Swiss women took fifth place.

In a game versus Russia at the 2012 IIHF Women's World Championship, Schelling stopped 32 shots in a 5–2 victory, as Switzerland advanced to the semifinals. In the bronze medal game at the 2012 IIHF Women's World Championship, Florence Schelling made 50 saves as Switzerland beat Finland by a 6–2 tally.

At the 2014 Winter Olympics at Sochi, Schelling backstopped the Swiss National Team to a bronze medal. Making 252 saves throughout the tournament, she was named Most Valuable Player, Best Goalkeeper, and included on the All-Star Team.

At the time of her induction announcement into the 2026 IIHF Hall of Fame, Schelling held the record for most Olympic wins by a goaltender with 10, and most Olympic shutouts with five.

=== Northeastern ===
Schelling excelled at Northeastern, being named a starter throughout her college career. In her sophomore year (2009–10), Schelling was named Hockey East Defensive Player of the Week for three consecutive weeks (weeks of 2, 9, 16 November). She posted a 30-save shutout against Robert Morris on 10 October and made 28 saves on 29 shots vs. Bemidji State on 23 October. She earned back-to-back shutouts over Vermont on 30–31 October, combining for 42 saves over the weekend. She was named Bauer Goaltender of the Month on 3 November after posting a 6–1–1 record, a 0.74 GAA and a .970 save percentage in October. She made 37 saves and stopped 11 of 13 shootout attempts at Providence on 8 November. Schelling shut out Vermont for the third time on 25 November and made 30 stops vs. the University of New Hampshire on 29 November. She led the nation with a 0.99 GAA and a 0.964 save percentage through December.

On 6 February 2009, Schelling made a Hockey East season-high 53 saves at Providence. The following day, she stopped 42 of 44 shots in a 3–2 win versus Providence. She recorded her eighth 30-plus save game 21 February against Boston University, making 38 saves. She stopped 35 of 37 shots in a 2–1 loss to BU in the Hockey East quarterfinals.

Schelling started in the first-ever outdoor women's college hockey game 8 January vs. the University of New Hamphshire at Fenway Park. New Hampshire won the game by a score of 5–3.

During the 2010–11 season, Schelling stopped 50 shots (.943 save percentage) in two wins against Princeton and RPI. A total of 25 saves was notched in each victory and she was recognized as the Hockey East Defensive Player of the Week for the week of 25 October. She also tallied her first career point as she assisted on Stephanie Gavronsky's goal against the Princeton Tigers. On 5 March 2011, Schelling set a Hockey East tournament record with 44 saves, including a record 24 in the first period as the Huskies upset No. 1 seed Boston University by a 4–2 tally at Walter Brown Arena.

On Friday, 17 February 2012, #7 ranked Northeastern skated to a 0–0 tie against the Providence Friars. The two goaltenders, Schelling of Northeastern and Geneviève Lacasse of Providence, stopped 80 shots combined through three periods and overtime. Schelling logged 38 stops, while her counterpart Lacasse stopped 42 shots.

=== CWHL ===
Schelling made her CWHL debut with the Brampton Thunder on 21 October 2012. Opposite Furies netminder Christina Kessler, Schelling claimed the win after teammate Gillian Apps notched a goal in overtime, ending the game at 4–3.

== Career statistics ==
=== Northeastern ===
Season	Games played	Wins	Losses	Ties	Win %	Shutouts	Goals against average	Save %
2008–09	19	5	12	1	.306	2	2.24	.933
2009–10	21	11	5	4	.650	4	1.37	.949
2010–11	28	13	9	6	.571	4	2.02	.930
2011–12	30	20	6	4	.733	8	1.42	.950
Career	98	49	32	15	.589	18	1.74	.940

=== International ===
Year	Team	Event	Result	GP	W	L	T/OT	MIN	GA	SO	GAA	SV%
2006	Switzerland	OG	7th	3	1	1	0	150:00	6	1	2.40	0.933
2010	Switzerland	OG	5th	5	2	2	0	301:55	16	1	3.18	0.909
2014	Switzerland	OG	3rd place, bronze medalist(s)	6	2	4	0	362:38	24	1	3.97	0.913
2018	Switzerland	OG	5th	5	4	1	0	298:19	7	2	1.41	0.942

== Awards and honors ==
- 2014 Sochi Winter Olympics: Most Valuable Player
- 2014 Sochi Winter Olympics: Best Goalkeeper
- 2014 Sochi Winter Olympics: All-Star Team selection
- 2012 World Championships: Best Goalkeeper
- 2007 Swiss Ice Hockey Female Player of the Year
- 2026 inductee into the IIHF Hall of Fame

=== NCAA ===
- Hockey East Bauer Goaltender of the Month for October 2009
- Hockey East Bauer Goaltender of the Month for November 2009
- Hockey East All-Rookie team (2009)
- Hockey East Pure Hockey Defensive Player of the Week 13 October 2008
- Hockey East Mission Rookie of the Week 20 October 2008
- Hockey East Defensive Player of the Week (Week of 5 October 2009)
- 2010 Hockey East Co-Player of the Year
- 2010 Hockey East Goaltending Champion
- 2010 Hockey East First-Team All-Star
- 2010 New England Hockey Writers All-Star Team
- 2010 Women's RBK Hockey Division I All-America Second Team
- Hockey East Defensive Player of the Week (Week of 25 October 2010)
- Hockey East Defensive Player of the Week (Week of 8 November 2010)
- Hockey East Defensive Player of the Week (Week of 28 February 2011)
- Hockey East Defensive Player of the Week (Week of 7 March 2011)
- 2011 Hockey East All-Tournament team
- Hockey East Defensive Player of the Week (Week of 10 October 2011)
- Hockey East Goaltender of the Month (October 2011)
- Hockey East Defensive Player of the Week (7 November 2011)
- Hockey East Defensive Player of the Week (14 November 2011)
- Hockey East Co-Defensive Player of the Week (23 January 2012)
- Hockey East Defensive Player of the Week (6 February 2012)
- Runner-Up, Hockey East Defensive Player of the Month (January 2012)
- Hockey East Player of the Week (20 February 2012)
- 2012 Hockey East Player of the Year
- 2012 Hockey East Army ROTC Three Stars Award
- Hockey East Goaltending Champion (2011–12)
- Hockey East 10th Anniversary Team selection, Honorable Mention
- 2011–12 CCM Hockey Women's Division I All-American: First Team
