= Kelli Stack =

American ice hockey forward (born 1988)

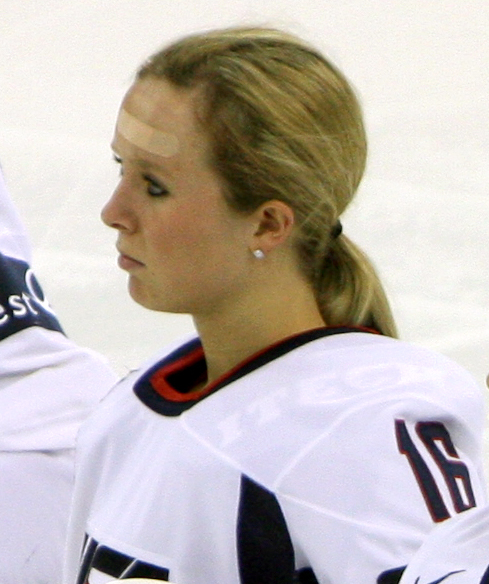
- Born: January 13, 1988 (age 38) Cleveland, Ohio, U.S.
- Height: 5 ft 5 in (165 cm)
- Weight: 137 lb (62 kg; 9 st 11 lb)
- Position: Forward
- Shoots: Right
- CWHL team Former teams: Kunlun Red Star: Connecticut Whale (PHF); Boston Blades (CWHL); Boston College Eagles (NCAA)
- National team: United States
- Playing career: 2006–present
Medal record
Olympic Games
Silver medal – second place	2010 Vancouver	Team
Silver medal – second place	2014 Sochi	Team
World Championships
Gold medal – first place	2008 China
Gold medal – first place	2009 Finland
Gold medal – first place	2011 Switzerland
Gold medal – first place	2016 Canada
Gold medal – first place	2017 United States
Silver medal – second place	2012 United States

Kelli Allison Stack (born January 13, 1988) is an American former ice hockey forward, who played for Kunlun Red Star in the Canadian Women's Hockey League. She is a member of the United States women's national ice hockey team. Stack competed for the Boston College Eagles women's ice hockey program and after completing her Olympic commitment, returned to Boston College for her senior year of 2010–11. She was drafted 14th overall by the Boston Blades in the 2011 CWHL Draft.

== Playing career ==
=== NCAA ===
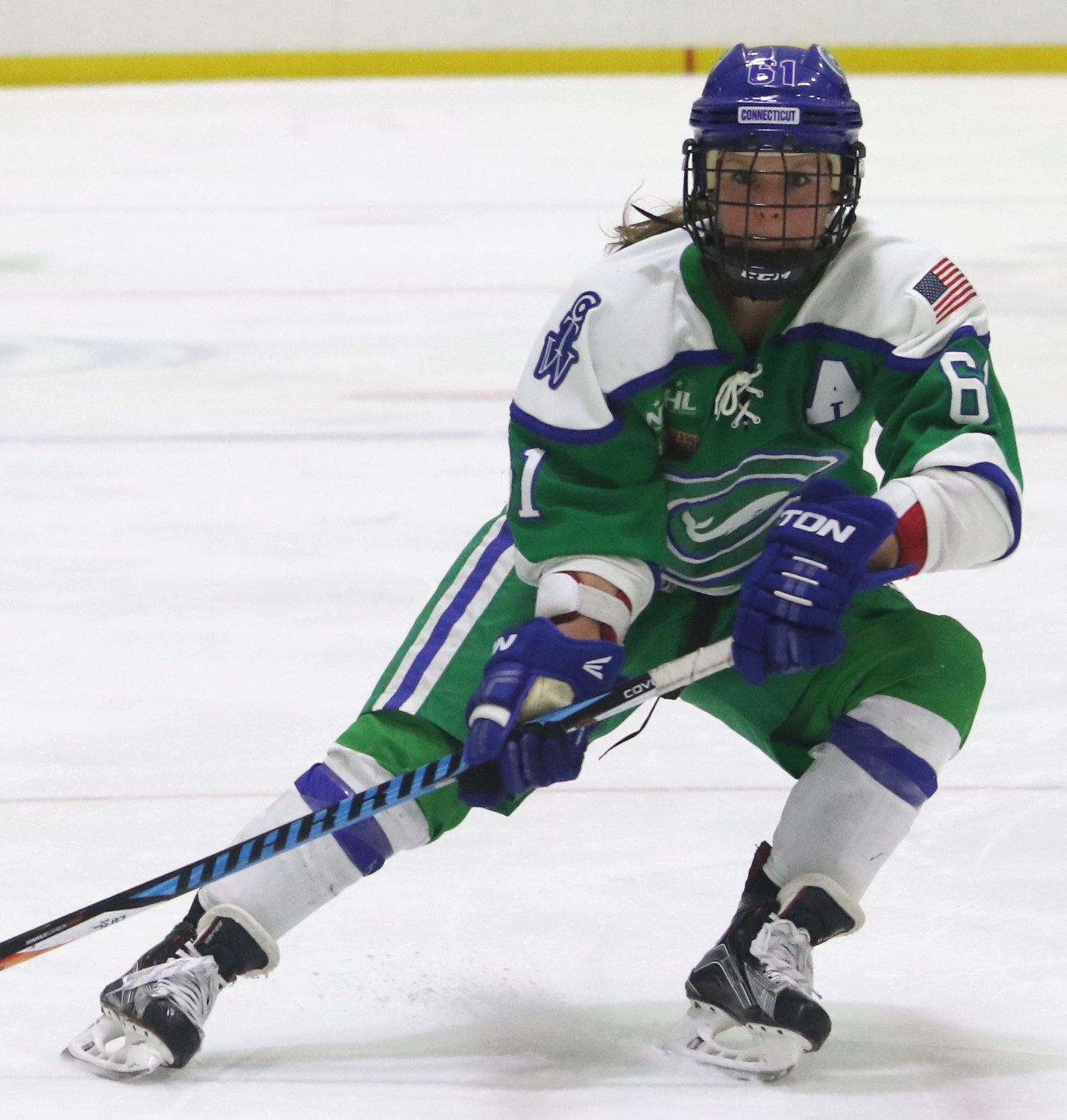
Stack playing for the Connecticut Whale in the 2016–17 NWHL season

On February 8, 2011, with two points in the game against Boston University in the first round of the 2011 Beanpot Tournament, Kelli Stack accumulated 199 points in her career and broke BC's all-time career points record, becoming the new program leader. The previous record had been held by Erin Magee ('99). On January 31, 2011, Kelli Stack became the all-time leading goal scorer in Hockey East Conference history to bring her career total to 65, breaking Jen Hitchcock's (University of New Hampshire) record of 61 goals.

At the conclusion of her career at Boston College, Stack was voted the New England Division I Player of the Year after leading Hockey East in points (56) and goals (34). The Second Team All-American scored two goals to help advance the Eagles to the Frozen Four for the second time in her tenure. The three-time Hockey East Player of the Year accumulated 58 points for the season and concluded her collegiate career as BC's all-time leading scorer with 209 points.

Stack was among the three finalists nominated for the 2011 Patty Kazmaier Award and the first nominee from Boston College. An award of the USA Hockey Foundation, the Patty Kazmaier Memorial Award is annually bestowed upon the top player in NCAA Division I women's ice hockey. Stack was also nominated for the award in 2009. Stack was also a four-time All-Conference selection, the first player to accomplish this feat in the nine-year history of Hockey East.

=== USA Hockey ===
Stack played in all five games contested by the Team USA in the 2010 Winter Olympics. She accumulated eight points, five assists and three goals, with four points in the game against Russia. Team USA went on to win a silver medal, losing to Canada in the gold medal game 0–2. In the second game of the 2011 IIHF Eight Nations Tournament, Stack was one of two US players to register a hat trick in a victory over Japan. In the first game of the 2012 IIHF Women's World Championship, she had three assists in a 9–2 victory over Canada. In a game versus Finland at the 2012 Worlds, she scored a hat trick and added three assists in an 11–0 victory.

Stack again played in all five of USA's games at the 2014 Winter Olympics, scoring five points. Team USA won the silver medal, losing to Canada 3–2 in overtime in the gold medal game.

=== CWHL: Boston Blades ===
Selected by the Boston Blades in the 2011 CWHL Draft, Stack set a franchise record for most points scored in one season with 42. In round-robin play at the 2012 Clarkson Cup, Stack scored two goals, as the Blades earned a 5–2 victory over the Toronto Furies. During the 2012–13 CWHL season, Stack only played in eight games before suffering a season-ending injury. Despite her injury, she traveled with the Blades to the 2013 Clarkson Cup.

=== NWHL: Connecticut Whale ===
On September 24, 2015, it was announced that Stack had signed with the Connecticut Whale of the semi-professional NWHL for the league's inaugural season. In 2016–17, Stack set the franchise record in goals scored with 12 in 16 games played.

=== CWHL: Kunlun Red Star WIH ===
The CWHL expanded to have two new teams in Shenzhen as China prepares to host the 2022 Winter Olympics. After being cut from the 2018 USA Olympic team, Stack joined the Kunlun Red Star WIH as a hockey ambassador. Stack earned an assist on the first goal in Red Star WIH history, scored by Zoe Hickel.

Stack led the CWHL in points with 49 in 28 games for Red Star WIH. She appeared with the Red Star in the 2018 Clarkson Cup final where she scored the team's only goal of the game in the second period in a 2–1 loss to the Markham Thunder.

== Career statistics ==
= Indicates league leader

Year	Team	League	GP	G	A	Pts	+/-	PIM	PPG	SHG	GWG
2011–12	Boston Blades	CWHL	27	25	17	42	+35	30	4	0	3
2012–13	Boston Blades	CWHL	8	4	3	7	+6	12	1	0	2
2014–15	Boston Blades	CWHL	2	1	1	2	0	0	1	0	1
2015–16	Connecticut Whale	NWHL	17	8	14	22	—	—	—	—	—
2017–18	Kunlun Red Star WIH	CWHL	28	26	23	49	+25	40	5	0	5
Career			82	64	58	122		82	11		11

== Awards and honors ==
=== CWHL ===
- CWHL First All-Star Team, 2011–12
- CWHL All-Rookie Team, 2011–12
- CWHL Monthly Top Scorer, December 2011
- 2018 Angela James Bowl
- 2018 CWHL Most Valuable Player Award

=== NCAA ===
- Hockey East Player of the Week (Week of November 1, 2010)
- Hockey East Player of the Week (Week of March 7, 2011)
- Hockey East Pure Hockey Player of the Month (October 2010)
- Hockey East Pure Hockey Player of the Month, November 2010
- Runner-Up, Hockey East Player of the Month (January 2011)
- 2011 Patty Kazmaier Award Nominee
- 2010–11 Hockey East Army ROTC Three Stars Award: Kelli Stack, Boston College
- 2010–11 Hockey East Scoring Champion: Kelli Stack, Boston College
- 2010–11 Cammi Granato Award (Hockey East Player of the Year)
- 2011 Hockey East All-Tournament team
- 2011 Hockey East Tournament MVP
- 2011 All-Hockey East First Team
- 2011 Second Team All-America selection
- 2010–11 New England Women's Player of the Year
- 2010–11 New England Women's Division I All-Star
- Hockey East 10th Anniversary Team selection

=== IIHF ===
- Best Forward, 2011 4 Nations Cup
- Directorate Award, Best Forward, 2012 International Ice Hockey Federation Women's World Championships

=== USA Hockey ===
- 2012 Bob Allen Women's Player of the Year Award
