= 2010–11 ECAC Hockey women's season =

The 2010–11 ECAC Hockey women's ice hockey season marked the continuation of the annual tradition of competitive ice hockey among ECAC members.

== Exhibition ==
Date	ECAC school	Opponent	Time	Score	Goal scorers
09/24/2010	Quinnipiac	Ontario Hockey Academy	7:00 ET	Qpac, 3-1	Kelly Babstock (2), Lindsay Burman
09/25/10	Union	Etobicoke (PWHL)	7:00 pm	3-0	
10/15/2010	Cornell	Etobicoke (PWHL)	7:00 ET	Cornell, 6-0	Rebecca Johnston (2), Brianne Jenner, Jessica Campbell, Hayley Hughes

- PWHL is Provincial Women's Hockey League in Ontario, Canada

== Season standings ==
2010–11 Eastern College Athletic Conference standings
	Conference							Overall					
	GP	W	L	T	PTS	GF	GA	GP	W	L	T	GF	GA
#2 Cornell†*	22	20	1	1	41			35	31	3	1		
Harvard	22	14	5	3	31			32	17	11	4		
Dartmouth	22	15	7	0	30			8	5	3	0		
Princeton	22	13	8	1	27			31	16	14	1		
Quinnipiac	22	12	9	1	25			37	22	12	3		
Clarkson	22	10	8	4	24			37	14	17	6		
St. Lawrence	22	11	11	0	22			7	4	3	0		
Rensselaer	22	8	12	2	18			9	4	3	1		
Colgate	22	8	12	2	18			33	11	19	3		
Yale	22	8	12	2	18			29	9	17	3		
Brown	22	1	17	4	6			29	2	23	4		
Union	22	1	19	2	4			34	2	29	3		
Championship: Cornell † indicates conference regular season champion * indicates conference tournament champion Current rankings: USCHO.com Division I women's poll

== Regular season ==
=== News and notes ===
- October 15–16: Regan Boulton of Quinnipiac registered three goals and two assists. In a 4-2 win versus the Maine Black Bears, she registered her first-career hat trick.
- November 10: Former Harvard player Angela Ruggiero will serve on the evaluation commission that will inspect the three cities competing to host the 2018 Olympic Winter Games. She will be one of four Americans on the 11-member panel that will travel to potential host cities for on-site inspections from February 8-March 5, 2011.
- November 12–13: Kelly Babstock made Quinnipiac hockey history as she accounted for six of the seven goals scored over the weekend. Babstock registered back to back hat tricks against ECAC opponents (No. 10 ranked Harvard and Dartmouth). In addition, she is the first skater in Quinnipiac history to record two hat tricks in one season. As of November 14, Babstock led the team and the entire NCAA in goals (13) and points (27).
- On Friday, Dec. 3 against Brown, Kelly Babstock became Quinnipiac's all-time leader in goals scored in a season by netting her 16th goal of the season. Babstock's nation leading sixth game-winning goal against Yale on Saturday, Dec. 4 was part of a Bobcats 3-1 win.
- December 10: Vanessa Emond accumulated four points (two goals, two assists) as the Skating Saints upset the Mercyhurst Lakers. She scored the opening goal of the game at 6:34 on the power play. In the second period, she would score another goal to extend the lead to 5-0. The four point effort was a career high for Emond.
- December 14: Quinnipiac women's ice hockey assistant coach Cassandra Turner was selected to serve as assistant coach for Canada at the 2011 IIHF World Women's Under-18 Championship.
- January 7–8: Cornell freshman goaltender Lauren Slebodnik earned two shutouts in her first two career starts. On January 7, she made her NCAA debut by shutting out Yale by a 5-0 margin. With Cornell dressing just 12 skaters, she stopped all 23 Yale shots. The following night, Slebodnik shut out the Brown Bears by a 3-0 mark. Cornell only dressed 11 skaters for the game and she stopped all 15 shots.
- January 8: Quinnipiac forward Kelly Babstock scored a hat trick, including the game-winning marker at 3:25 in overtime. Her goal lifted the Bobcats to a come from behind victory over ECAC Hockey opponent Clarkson.
- In February 2011, three months after the passing of Daron Richardson, the Yale Bulldogs were inspired to raise awareness of youth mental health issues. Freshman forward Jenna Ciotti played with Daron’s sister, Morgan on the Ottawa Senators of the PWHL. In addition, Ciotti was also coached by Daron’s father, Luke Richardson. The Bulldogs’ support for the Do It For Daron charity was symbolized by the purple wristbands the club wore during the month of February and March in the 2010–11 Yale Bulldogs women's ice hockey season. She played on the PWHL Senators with Morgan Richardson (under Luke Richardson’s coaching) for two seasons. Ciotti wanted the bracelets to keep Daron's spirit alive and support the Richardson family.

=== National rankings ===
Week of	ECAC school	USA Today poll	USCHO poll
September 27	Cornell; Harvard		2; 8
October 4	Cornell; Harvard		2; 7
October 11	Cornell; Harvard		2; 9
October 18	Cornell; Harvard		2; 9
October 25	Cornell; Harvard		2; 9
November 1			
November 8			

== In season honors ==
=== MLX Skates Players of the week ===
Throughout the conference regular season, ECAC Hockey offices names a player of the week each Monday.

Week	Player of the week
October 5	Kate Wheeler, Quinnipiac
October 11	Erica Uden Johansson, Quinnipiac
October 18	Regan Boulton, Quinnipiac
October 25	Kate Wheeler, Quinnipiac
November 1	Liza Ryabkina, Harvard
November 8	Hayley Hughes, Cornell
November 15	Sasha Nanji, Dartmouth
November 22	Alley Bero, St. Lawrence
November 29	Kate Weeler, Quinnipiac
December 5	Kelly Babstock, Quinnipiac
December 12	Vanessa Emond
January 4	Jenna Hobeika, Dartmouth
January 11	Rebecca Johnston, Cornell
January 18	Kelly Sabatine, St. Lawrence
January 25	Camille Dumais, Dartmouth
February 1	Danielle Skirrow, Clarkson
February 8	Jenna Ciotti, Yale
February 15	Kelly Babstock, Quinnipiac
February 22	Amanda Trunzo, Dartmouth
March 1	Rebecca Johnston, Cornell
March 8	Hayley Hughes, Cornell

=== Defensive Players of the week ===
Week	Def. Player of the week
October 5	Victoria Vigilanti, Quinnipiac
October 11	Victoria Vigilanti, Quinnipiac
October 18	Kimberly Sass, Colgate
October 25	Lauren Dahm, Clarkson
November 1	Amanda Mazzotta, Cornell
November 8	Amanda Mazzotta, Cornell
November 15	Katie Jamieson, Brown
November 22	Amanda Mazzotta, Cornell
November 29	Jackee Snikeris, Yale
December 5	Victoria Vigilanti, Quinnipiac
December 12	Rachel Weber, Princeton
January 4	Rachel Weber, Princeton
January 11	Rachel Weber, Princeton
January 18	Kate Gallagher, Union
January 25	Lauren Slebodnik, Cornell
February 1	Erica Howe, Clarkson
February 8	Victoria Vigilanti, Quinnipiac
February 15	Lindsay Holdcroft, Dartmouth
February 22	Lindsay Holdcroft, Dartmouth
March 1	Victoria Vigilanti, Quinnipiac
March 8	Amanda Mazzotta, Cornell

=== Rookies of the week ===
Throughout the conference regular season, ECAC Hockey offices names a rookie of the week each Monday.

Week	Player of the week
October 5	Kelly Babstock, Quinnipiac
October 11	Erica Uden Johansson, Quinnipiac
October 18	Caitlyn Lahonen, St. Lawrence
October 25	Jessica Campbell, Cornell
November 1	
November 8	
November 15	Kelly Babstock, Quinnipiac
November 22	
November 29	
December 5	Kelly Babstock, Quinnipiac
December 12	Sally Butler, Princeton
January 4	Lindsay Holdcroft, Dartmouth
January 11	Lauren Slebodnik, Cornell
January 18	Carly Mercer, Clarkson
January 25	Lindsay Holdcroft, Dartmouth
February 1	
February 8	Jenna Ciotti, Yale
February 15	Kelly Babstock, Quinnipiac
February 22	Lindsay Holdcroft, Dartmouth
March 1	Brianne Jenner, Cornell
March 8	Jessica Campbell, Cornell

== Postseason ==
- March 18: Cornell participated in the NCAA women's Frozen Four. In the semi-final, the Big Red were bested by the Boston University Terriers women's ice hockey program by a 4-1 tally.

=== Postseason awards and honors ===
- Kelly Babstock, Quinnipiac, 2010-11 ECAC Player of the Year
- Kelly Babstock, Quinnipiac, 2010-11 ECAC Rookie of the Year
- Doug Derraugh, Cornell, ECAC Coach of the Year
- Regan Fisher, Dartmouth and Karlee Overguard, Cornell: ECAC co-Defensive Forward of the Year
- Lauriane Rougeau, ECAC top Defensive Defenseman
- Jackee Snikeris, Yale, 2010-11 ECAC Goaltender of the Year
- Jackee Snikeris, 2010-11 ECAC Women's Student-Athlete of the Year
- Jackee Snikeris, 2011 Sarah Devens Award

==== All-ECAC honors ====
===== First team =====
- Forward: Kelly Babstock, Quinnipiac
- Forward: Rebecca Johnston, Cornell
- Forward: Brianne Jenner, Cornell
- Defense: Laura Fortino, Cornell
- Defense: Lauriane Rougeau, Cornell
- Goaltender: Jackie Snikeris, Yale

===== Second team =====
- Forward: Chelsea Karpenko, Cornell
- Forward: Jillian Dempsey, Harvard
- Forward: Kelly Foley, Dartmouth
- Defense: Josephine Pucci, Harvard
- Defense: Sasha Sherry, Princeton
- Goaltender: Rachel Weber, Princeton

===== Third team =====
- Forward: Catherine White, Cornell
- Forward: Kelly Sabatine, St. Lawrence
- Forward: Liza Ryabkina, Harvard
- Defense: Sasha Nanji, Dartmouth
- Defense: Leanna Coskren, Harvard
- Goaltender: Victoria Vigilanti, Quinnipiac

===== All-rookie team =====
- Forward: Kelly Babstock, Quinnipiac
- Forward: Brianne Jenner, Cornell
- Forward: Carly Mercer, Clarkson
- Defense: Alyssa Gagliardi, Cornell
- Defense: Marissa Gedman, Harvard
- Goaltender: Erica Howe, Clarkson

==== All-Americans ====
===== First Team =====
- Laura Fortino, Cornell

===== Second Team =====
- Lauriane Rougeau, Cornell
- Rebecca Johnston, Cornell

== 2011 ECAC Women's Ice Hockey Tournament ==
Quarter-finals
1	Cornell	2
8	RPI	0
4	Princeton	0
5	Quinnipiac	2
2	Harvard	2
7	St. Lawrence	0
3	Dartmouth	2
6	Clarkson	1

Semi-finals
1	Cornell	1
5	Quinnpiac	0
2	Harvard	0
3	Dartmouth	1

ECAC Final
1	Cornell	1
3	Dartmouth	0

- Note: The chart indicates the number of games won in the tournament and not the actual scores.

== See also ==
- National Collegiate Women's Ice Hockey Championship
- 2010–11 CHA women's ice hockey season
- 2010–11 WCHA women's ice hockey season
- 2010–11 Hockey East women's ice hockey season
- ECAC women's ice hockey
