= 2010–11 NCAA Division I women's ice hockey season =

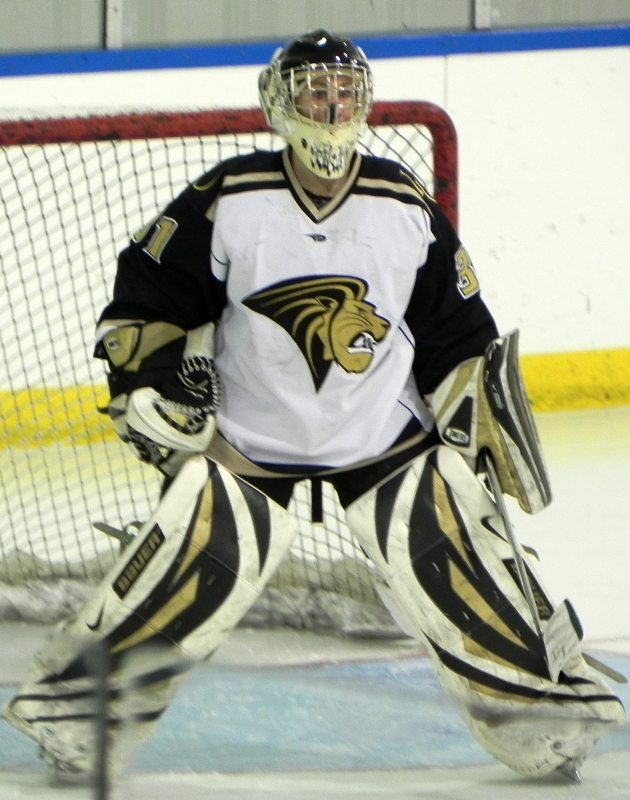
- NCAA tournament: 2011
- National championship: Erie, Pennsylvania
- NCAA champion: Wisconsin Badgers
- Patty Kazmaier Award: Meghan Duggan ()

The 2010–11 NCAA Division I women's ice hockey season began in October, ending with the 2011 NCAA Division I Women's Ice Hockey Tournament's championship game in March 2011. The Frozen Four was hosted by Mercyhurst College at Louis J. Tullio Arena in Erie, Pennsylvania.

== Offseason ==
- May 26: 2010 Winter Olympian Karen Thatcher has been named an assistant coach at Colgate.
- June 2, 2010: The University of Connecticut men's and women's ice hockey teams will play outdoor games at Rentschler Field on Sunday, Feb. 13. This event will be part of the "Whalers Hockey Fest". The UConn men's team will take on Sacred Heart. The women's team will face the Providence Friars women's ice hockey program in a Hockey East game.
- June 2, 2010: 2010 Canadian Olympic gold medallists Catherine Ward and Marie-Philip Poulin have tentatively agreed to join the Boston University Terriers.
- June 7: Yale Bulldogs head coach Hilary Witt will leave the program at the end of June. Witt coached the Bulldogs for eight seasons and is the program's most victorious coach, accumulating 96 wins during her tenure.
- June 7: Mandi Schwartz was recently diagnosed for a second time with acute myeloid leukemia. Schwartz will require a cord-blood or blood-marrow donor.
- June 7: Olympic silver medallist Julie Chu has been named as an assistant coach. Previously, Chu was assistant coach for the University of Minnesota Duluth women's hockey team that won the 2008 NCAA National Championship.
- August 27: Mercyhurst Lakers player Meghan Agosta was announced as a finalist for the Women's Sports Foundation's 2010 Sportswoman of the Year Team Award. It is awarded to the top female athlete (NCAA, Olympic, professional) who has demonstrated exceptional play in helping her team win a championship.
- September 13: The Minnesota-Duluth Bulldogs visit the White House and are honored in a Rose Garden ceremony with President Barack Obama as the 2010 NCAA National Champions.
- September 17: Terrence M. and Kim Pegula from Boca Raton, Florida have donated $88 million to Penn State University for a multi-purpose arena. The arena will mean that Penn State will add an NCAA Division I men's hockey program and a Division I women's hockey program. PSU plans to play as an independent for two years starting in 2012. The new arena was scheduled to open in April 2014.

== Season outlook ==
=== Preseason polls ===
- USA Today/USA Hockey Women's Rankings

Rank	NCAA school	Points
1	Minnesota Duluth	187
2	Cornell	167
3	Mercyhurst	136
4	Boston University	132
5	Wisconsin	115
6	Minnesota	106
7	Clarkson	70
8	Boston College	46
9	Harvard	39
10	Ohio State	12

== Exhibition ==
=== CIS Exhibition ===
Date	NCAA school	Opponent	Score	NCAA goal scorers
Sep 24	Providence	McGill	3–1	
Sep 24	Boston College	Windsor	3–0, BC	Ashley Motherwell, Danielle Doherty, Mary Restuccia
Sep 25	Boston University	Windsor	4–1, BU	Jillian Kirchner; Jill Cardella; Britt Hergesheimer; Louise Warren
Sep 25	Mercyhurst	Wilfrid Laurier	7–0, Mercyhurst	Cassea Schols, Pamela Zgoda, Kelley Steadman, Lauren Jones, Christie Cicero, Samantha Watt, Kylie Rossler
Sep 25	Providence	McGill	6–4	
Sep 26	Northeastern	McGill	3–2 (OT), Northeastern	Katie McSorley; Lori Antflick; Kristi Kehoe (game winner)
Sep 26	Minnesota	Manitoba	8–0	Amanda Kessel (3), Emily West (2), Jen Schoullis, Becky Kortum, Nikki Ludwigson
Oct 2	Ohio State	Wilfird Laurier	Ohio State, 2–0	Hokey Langan, Tina Hollowell
Oct 2	Vermont	McGill	Tie, 2–2	Emily Walsh, Celeste Doucet
Oct 23	Harvard	McGill	2–2	

=== Other ===
Date	NCAA school	Opponent	Time	Score	Goal scorers
September 24, 2010	Quinnipiac	Ontario Hockey Academy	7:00 ET	Qpac, 3–1	Kelly Babstock (2), Lindsay Burman
09/25/10	Union	Etobicoke (PWHL)	7:00 pm	3–0	
09/25/10	North Dakota	Toronto Aeros	2:07 p.m. CT	9–0	Sara Dagenais, Mary Loken (2), Jocelyne Lamoureux (3), Monique Lamoureux (2)
October 15, 2010	Cornell	Etobicoke (PWHL)	7:00 ET	6–0	Rebecca Johnston (2), Brianne Jenner, Jessica Campbell, Hayley Hughes

== News and notes ==
=== October ===
- October 1: Mercyhurst Lakers player Meghan Agosta joined Jesse Scanzano as only the second Mercyhurst player to have 100 career assists. She picked up the assist in the second period.
- October 1: In her first game as a Golden Gopher, Amanda Kessel registered four points (two goals, two assists). The following day, Kessel scored the game-winning goal as the Gophers won by a 3–0 score. The game against Clarkson marked the first time in school history that the Gophers opened a season against a ranked opponent.
- October 2: Olympic gold medallist Marie-Philip Poulin debuted with the Boston University Terriers women's ice hockey program. In her first game, she scored the first goal of her NCAA career. It was a 4–5 loss at North Dakota.
- October 9: With the 1–0 shutout over Wayne State, the Gophers have not allowed a goal in 180 minutes. Dating back to the 2009–10 season, Minnesota has not allowed a goal in 200:45 minutes played.
- October 12: The WCHA had five of its teams ranked in the two national polls for the week. It is believed to be the first time five WCHA teams have ever been ranked among the top 10 in the nation at one time.
- October 15: Bailey Bram registered two assists, including her 100th career point, in a game against the Bemidji State Beavers. She became the 11th Lakers player to crack the century mark in the 4–0 win.
- October 15: With her third shorthanded goal of the season on October 15, freshman Marie-Philip Poulin tied BU's single-season record for shorthanded tallies in just four games.
- October 16: In a 7–1 win against Connecticut, Isabel Menard recorded the first hat trick in Syracuse Orange women's ice hockey history (and added an assist).
- On October 23, 2010, Jocelyne Lamoureux had a hat trick and one assist. In addition, one of her goals was the game-winning goal. The hat trick was the first by a North Dakota player since Cami Wooster in 2005.
- As the Lakers went 6–1–0 in October 2010, Bestland scored four goals, including two in a 7–3 defeat of the Robert Morris Colonials. In addition, she had six assists. In her first game as a Laker, she scored a goal. She registered points in five of the seven games played and finished the month with a plus/minus rating of +13. For her efforts, she was recognized as College Hockey America's Rookie of the Month.

=== November ===
- November 12–13: Kelly Babstock made Quinnipiac hockey history as she accounted for six of the seven goals scored over the weekend. Babstock registered back to back hat tricks against ECAC opponents (No. 10 ranked Harvard and Dartmouth). In addition, she is the first skater in Quinnipiac history to record two hat tricks in one season. As of November 14, Babstock led the team and the entire NCAA in goals (13) and points (27).
- November 13: The 1–0 shutout by Connecticut on November 13 ended New Hampshire's 17-game unbeaten streak against the Huskies The Huskies penalty kill was a perfect 6-of-6 on the weekend. The shutout on November 13 marked the first time the Wildcats were shut out at home since November 28, 2004 (by Mercyhurst), a streak of 109 consecutive home games.
- November 21: Northeastern player Katie McSorley recorded her first career hat trick and added two assists as the Huskies prevailed by a 5–1 tally over the Providence Friars. The hat trick was the first hat trick for a Northeastern player since Julia Marty in 2008. It was also the first five-point game by a Husky since Chelsey Jones tallied five points against Maine on December 3, 2006.

=== December ===
- Dec . 1: Northeastern Huskies freshman Rachel Llanes scored the first and last goal of the game in Northeastern's 4–0 win over New Hampshire with six shots on goal. It was her first-ever multi-goal game. Another freshman, Katie MacSorley scored a goal in the 4–0 win over New Hampshire. Florence Schelling made 22 saves for her third shutout of the season. With the win, Northeastern snapped a 27-game unbeaten streak (0–26–1) against New Hampshire. Their last win over New Hampshire was January 21, 2001, a 2–1 win. In addition, the fact that it was a shutout victory marks the first over UNH in the history of the program.
- On Friday, Dec 3 against Brown, Kelly Babstock became Quinnipiac's all-time leader in goals scored in a season by netting her 16th goal of the season. Babstock's nation leading sixth game-winning goal against Yale on Saturday, Dec 4 was part of a Bobcats 3–1 win.
- January 3, 7–8: In three games played, Rachel Weber earned three victories and allowed only one goal. On January 3, she defeated Quinnipiac by a 3–0 tally and shutout Clarkson by a 2–0 score on January 7. The following day, she gave up her only goal of the week in a 3–1 win over St. Lawrence. Her shutout streak spanned six games and lasted 289:43. She is now the owner of the longest shutout streak in ECAC history and the fourth longest in NCAA Division I since the 2000–01 season.
- January 7–8: Cornell freshman goaltender Lauren Slebodnik earned two shutouts in her first two career starts. On January 7, she made her NCAA debut by shutting out Yale by a 5–0 margin. With Cornell dressing just 12 skaters, she stopped all 23 Yale shots. The following night, Slebodnik shut out the Brown Bears by a 3–0 mark. Cornell only dressed 11 skaters for the game and she stopped all 15 shots.

=== January ===
- January 15: Bailey Bram registered two goals and four assists for a career-high six points as Mercyhurst defeated Brown 12–0. Mercyhurst notched 12 goals in a game for the first time since the 1999–2000 season.
- On January 16, the Boston University Terriers defeated Maine and set a program record with their 11th home win of the season. The previous mark was 10 wins during the 2006–07 season.
- On January 22, 2011, Marie-Philip Poulin recorded a hat trick, including two power play goals as BU prevailed over Vermont in a 4–0 win. The win was the Terriers 100th win in program history. Poulin broke BU's single-season points record with her second goal of the game and later tied the single-season goals record with her third marker.
- January 21–22: Meghan Agosta recorded five points on two goals and three assists in a two-game sweep of Robert Morris. With the five point effort, Agosta is now just seven points away from breaking former Harvard player Julie Chu’s mark of 285 points to become the NCAA all-time points leader.
- Jan 21–22: Wisconsin right winter Meghan Duggan led the top-ranked Badgers with four scoring points in a win and tie at defending national champion Minnesota Duluth. Duggan registered two goals and two assists against the Bulldogs, recorded nine shots on goal and finished with a +4 plus/minus rating in the two games. She led all players with three points in the January 21 win (4–1). She scored the Badgers first goal of the game (it was the first women’s college hockey goal scored at the Bulldogs new AMSOIL Arena). In the second period, she assisted on a power-play tally to give Wisconsin a 3–0 lead. In the final two minutes, she had an empty net goal. The following day, both clubs skated to a 4–4 tie (Wisconsin prevailed 2–1 in the shootout). Duggan assisted on the Badgers’ second goal of the game and extended her current point streak to 22 games, the longest individual point streak in Wisconsin women's hockey history. On January 21, she broke the previous mark of 20 games set by Meghan Hunter from October 14, 2000, to January 12, 2001.
- The January 29, 2011, game between Wisconsin and Minnesota was played before a women's college

hockey record crowd of 10,668.

=== February ===
- On February 4, 2011, Meghan Agosta became the all-time leading scorer in NCAA women's hockey history with three goals and one assist in Mercyhurst College's 6–2 win over Wayne State in Erie, Pennsylvania. Agosta's four points gave her 286 career points, one more than ex-Harvard forward Julie Chiu's record of 285 set in 2006–07. Agosta, who also owns the record for most short-handed goals and game-winning goals, added three assists in the Lakers' 3–1 win over Wayne State on February 5.
- February 25, 2011: Meghan Agosta scored her 151st career goal to become all-time leading goal scorer in NCAA history. She accomplished this in a 6–2 victory over the Robert Morris Colonials women's ice hockey program at the Mercyhurst Ice Center. She surpassed Harvard's Nicole Corriero, who set the record at 150 during the 2004–05 season. The goal was scored on the power play at 15:18 of the second period with the assist going to Bailey Bram. She later added her 152nd goal in the third period.

=== Sports Illustrated ===
- Kelly Babstock was featured in Sports Illustrated's Faces in the Crowd feature in the January 17, 2011, issue (as recognition of breaking several Quinnipiac scoring records).
- Meghan Agosta was also featured in the Faces in the Crowd feature in the February 21, 2011, issue (as recognition of becoming the all-time NCAA scorer).

== Regular season ==
=== Standings ===
2010–11 College Hockey America standings
	Overall							Conference					
	GP	W	L	T	PTS	GF	GA	GP	W	L	T	GF	GA
#5 Mercyhurst†*	27	22	5	0	44	144	54	11	11	0	0	61	15
Niagara	28	9	14	5	23	41	68	12	6	4	2	23	26
Syracuse	28	11	13	4	26	71	79	10	5	4	1	23	23
Robert Morris	29	5	19	5	15	59	117	13	2	8	3	26	49
Wayne State	26	8	16	2	18	51	70	12	1	9	2	19	39
Championship: † indicates conference regular season champion * indicates conference tournament champion Current rankings: USCHO.com Division I women's poll

- Rankings based on number of wins in the conference

2010–11 Eastern College Athletic Conference standings
	Conference							Overall					
	GP	W	L	T	PTS	GF	GA	GP	W	L	T	GF	GA
#2 Cornell†*	22	20	1	1	41			35	31	3	1		
Harvard	22	14	5	3	31			32	17	11	4		
Dartmouth	22	15	7	0	30			8	5	3	0		
Princeton	22	13	8	1	27			31	16	14	1		
Quinnipiac	22	12	9	1	25			37	22	12	3		
Clarkson	22	10	8	4	24			37	14	17	6		
St. Lawrence	22	11	11	0	22			7	4	3	0		
Rensselaer	22	8	12	2	18			9	4	3	1		
Colgate	22	8	12	2	18			33	11	19	3		
Yale	22	8	12	2	18			29	9	17	3		
Brown	22	1	17	4	6			29	2	23	4		
Union	22	1	19	2	4			34	2	29	3		
Championship: Cornell † indicates conference regular season champion * indicates conference tournament champion Current rankings: USCHO.com Division I women's poll

2010–11 Hockey East Association standings
	Overall							Conference					
	GP	W	L	T	PTS	GF	GA	GP	W	L	T	GF	GA
#4 Boston University†	32	28	4	4	60	117	56	21	15	3	3	66	33
#7 Boston College*	31	20	6	5	45	92	56	21	13	4	4	55	32
#9 Providence	35	22	12	1	45	53	43	21	12	8	1	53	43
Connecticut	18	7	10	1	15	35	51	21	9	9	3	36	39
Northeastern	18	10	4	4	24	48	35	21	6	10	5	42	48
Maine	19	8	7	4	19	54	42	21	6	12	3	37	54
New Hampshire	19	9	10	0	18	33	40	21	7	13	1	35	50
Vermont	33	7	17	9	23	44	77	21	4	13	4	24	49
Championship: Boston College † indicates conference regular season champion * indicates conference tournament champion Current rankings: USCHO.com Division I women's poll

*Rankings based on number of wins in the conference

2010–11 Western Collegiate Hockey Association standings
	Conference								Overall					
	GP	W	L	T	SW	PTS	GF	GA	GP	W	L	T	GF	GA
#1 Wisconsin†*	28	24	2	2	2	76	140	50	38	34	2	2	203	66
#3 Minnesota	28	18	8	2	1	57	100	52	37	26	9	2	131	65
#6 Minnesota Duluth	28	18	7	3	0	57	109	49	33	22	8	3	131	53
#8 North Dakota	28	16	10	2	0	50	96	79	36	20	13	3	116	103
Bemidji State	28	11	13	4	2	39	53	71	35	14	17	4	70	88
Ohio State	28	8	17	3	3	30	69	100	36	14	19	3	99	116
Minnesota State	28	7	20	1	0	22	47	101	36	8	25	3	53	122
St. Cloud State	28	1	26	1	1	5	23	135	35	1	33	1	31	177
Championship: Wisconsin † indicates conference regular season champion * indicates conference tournament champion Current rankings: USCHO.com Division I women's poll

=== Outdoor Games ===
- The University of Connecticut men's and women's ice hockey teams will play outdoor games at Rentschler Field on Sunday, Feb. 13. This event will be part of the "Whalers Hockey Fest". The UConn men's team will take on Sacred Heart. The women's team will face the Providence Friars women's ice hockey program in a Hockey East game.

=== Season Tournaments ===
==== Nutmeg Classic ====
The Nutmeg Classic will be contested on November 26 and 27. The tournament is hosted by the Quinnipiac Bobcats program. The other competing schools include the Connecticut Huskies women's ice hockey, Sacred Heart Pioneers, and Yale Bulldogs.

Date	Schools	Score	Notes
Nov 26	Quinnipiac vs. Sacred Heart	Quinnipiac, 9–1	Kelly Babstock scored two goals
Nov 26	Yale vs. Connecticut	Yale, 5–2	
Nov 27	Connecticut vs. Sacred Heart	Connecticut, 11–0	
Nov 27	Quinnipiac vs. Yale	Quinnipiac, 2–1	Brittany Lyons scored game winner

==== Easton Holiday Classic ====
The Easton Holiday Classic will be played in St. Cloud, Minnesota.

Date	Schools	Score
Jan 1	Wisconsin vs. Northeastern	Wisconsin, 7–2
Jan. 1	Mercyhurst vs. St. Cloud State	
Jan. 2	Wisconsin vs. Mercyhurst	
Jan. 2	Northeastern vs. St. Cloud State	Northeastern, 2–1

==== Beanpot ====
The Beanpot involved Boston College, Boston University, Northeastern and Harvard. Mary Restuccia was named MVP while Molly Schaus received the Bertagna Goaltending Award.

Date	Schools	Score	Notes
Feb 8	Northeastern vs. Harvard	Tie, 3–3	Harvard wins in Shootout
Feb 8	Boston College vs. Boston University	BC, 2–1	Kelli Stack gets a goal and assist to become BC's all-time points leader
Feb. 11	Northeastern @ Boston University	BU, 4–3	Lauren Cherewyk scores game-winning goal
Feb. 12	Boston University @ Northeastern	BU, 5–1	Jennifer Wakefield scores two goals
Feb. 15	Boston University @ Northeastern	Tie, 3–3	Consolation game
Feb. 15	Boston College vs. Harvard	BC, 3–1	BC wins fourth Beanpot

== Scoring leaders ==
=== Hockey East ===
- (Through March 10)

Player	School	GP	G	A	P	PPG	PIM	PP	SH	GW	HT	+/-
Kelli Stack	BC	34	34	22	56	1.65	34	8	4	8	3	+27
Jenn Wakefield	BU	31	30	21	51	1.65	30	7	2	6	0	+23
Marie-Philip Poulin	BU	25	22	22	44	1.76	22	7	3	3	2	+23
Mary Restuccia	BC	35	11	27	38	1.09	56	3	0	4	0	+18
Rachel Llanes	Northeastern	37	12	19	31	0.84	12	4	1	2	0	+11

== Awards and honors ==
- Becca Ruegsegger, NCAA Elite 88 Award
- Jackee Snikeris, 2011 Sarah Devens Award

=== Patty Kazmaier Memorial Award Nominees ===
- February 21: Twenty-six players are among the list of nominees for the 2011 Patty Kazmaier Memorial Award, presented by Lake Erie College of Osteopathic Medicine. The list of 26 nominated players includes 17 forwards, five goaltenders and four defenders (from 12 different schools). Mercyhurst College, host of the 2011 NCAA Women's Frozen Four, leads all schools with five nominees.

Name	Pos.	Yr	School	Division
Meghan Agosta	F	Sr.	Mercyhurst	CHA
Kelly Babstock	F	Fr.	Quinnipiac	ECAC
Jenni Bauer	F	Sr.	Niagara	CHA
Vicki Bendus	F	Sr.	Mercyhurst	CHA
Bailey Bram	F	Jr.	Mercyhurst	CHA
Brianna Decker	F	So.	Wisconsin	WCHA
Meghan Duggan	F	Sr.	Wisconsin	WCHA
Laura Fortino	D	So.	Cornell	ECAC
Haley Irwin	F	Jr.	Minnesota-Duluth	WCHA
Brianne Jenner	F	Fr.	Cornell	ECAC
Rebecca Johnston	F	Jr.	Cornell	ECAC
Hilary Knight	F	Jr.	Wisconsin	WCHA
Jocelyne Lamoureux	F	So.	North Dakota	WCHA
Monique Lamoureux-Kolls	D/F	So.	North Dakota	WCHA
Jocelyne Larocque	D	Sr.	Minnesota Duluth	WCHA
Isabel Menard	F	So.	Syracuse	CHA
Hillary Pattenden	G	Jr.	Mercyhurst	CHA
Marie-Philip Poulin	F	Fr.	Boston University	Hockey East
Noora Raty	G	So.	Minnesota	WCHA
Lauriane Rougeau	D	So.	Cornell	ECAC
Jesse Scanzano	F	Sr.	Mercyhurst	CHA
Molly Schaus	G	Sr.	Boston College	Hockey East
Jackee Snikeris	G	Sr.	Yale	ECAC
Kelli Stack	F	Sr.	Boston College	Hockey East
Jenn Wakefield	F	Jr.	Boston University	Hockey East
Catherine Ward	Defense	Fr.	Boston University	Hockey East

=== Patty Kazmaier Memorial Award Finalists ===
March 3: The USA Hockey Foundation today announced the 10 finalists for the 2011 Patty Kazmaier Memorial Award.

- Meghan Agosta
- Vicki Bendus
- Meghan Duggan
- Laura Fortino
- Haley Irwin
- Rebecca Johnston
- Hilary Knight
- Noora Raty
- Molly Schaus
- Kelli Stack

=== Patty Kazmaier Memorial Award Top 3 ===
- Meghan Agosta
- Meghan Duggan (Winner)
- Kelli Stack

=== All-America honors ===
==== First team ====
Player	Position	School
Molly Schaus	G	Boston College
Laura Fortino	D	Cornell
Jocelyne Larocque	D	Minnesota-Duluth
Meghan Agosta	F	Mercyhurst
Meghan Duggan	F	Wisconsin
Hilary Knight	F	Wisconsin

==== Second team ====
Player	Position	School
Noora Raty	G	Minnesota
Lauriane Rougeau	D	Cornell
Catherine Ward	D	Boston University
Brianna Decker	F	Wisconsin
Rebecca Johnston	F	Cornell
Kelli Stack	F	Boston College

=== All Ivy League honors ===
- Laura Fortino, Cornell, Ivy League Player of the Year
- Brianne Jenner, Cornell, Ivy League Rookie of the Year

==== First Team All-Ivy ====
- Brianne Jenner, Forward, Cornell
- Rebecca Johnston, Forward, Cornell
- Chelsea Karpenko, Forward, Cornell
- Kelly Foley, Forward, Dartmouth
- Laura Fortino, Defense, Cornell
- Josephine Pucci, Defense, Harvard
- Jackee Snikeris, Goaltender, Yale

==== Second Team All-Ivy ====
- Catherine White, Forward, Cornell
- Amanda Trunzo, Forward, Dartmouth
- Liza Ryabkina, Forward, Harvard
- Jillian Dempsey, Forward, Harvard
- Lauriane Rougeau, Defense, Cornell
- Sasha Sherry, Defense, Princeton
- Rachel Weber, Goaltender, Princeton

==== Honorable Mention ====
- Leanna Coskren, Defense, Harvard
- Sasha Nanji, Defense, Dartmouth
- Lindsay Holdcroft, Goaltender, Dartmouth

=== 2010–11 New England Hockey Awards ===
- Kelli Stack, Senior, Forward, Boston College, Player of the Year
- Mark Hudak, Dartmouth, Coach of the Year

==== 2010–11 New England Women's Division I All-Stars ====
===== Goalies =====
- Molly Schaus, Senior, Boston College
- Jackee Snikeris, Senior, Yale

===== Defense =====
- Catherine Ward, Senior, Boston University
- Courtney Birchard, Senior, New Hampshire
- Amber Yung, Senior, Providence
- Josephine Pucci, Sophomore, Harvard

===== Forwards =====
- Kelly Babstock, Freshman, Quinnipiac
- Marie-Philip Poulin, Freshman, Boston University
- Mary Restuccia, Junior, Boston College
- Jenn Wakefield, Junior, Boston University
- Kelli Stack, Senior, Boston College
- Kelly Foley, Junior, Dartmouth

=== Other ===
- Amy Bourbeau, 2011 AHCA Assistant Coach Award (inaugural winner)

== Postseason tournaments ==
=== CHA championship game ===
March 5, 2011: In the CHA championship game, Meghan Agosta scored three goals to top 300 points for her career. The Lakers defeated Syracuse 5–4 and captured its ninth straight College Hockey America title. Despite getting outshot 13–3 in the first period, Syracuse scored two goals on its first two attempts on the power play. Stefanie Marty gave the Orange an early 1–0 lead and Margot Scharfe scored the second goal.

- Mercyhurst 5, Syracuse 4

=== ECAC championship game ===
- Cornell 3, Dartmouth 0

=== Hockey East championship game ===
- Boston College 3, Northeastern 1

=== WCHA championship game ===
- Wisconsin 5, Minnesota 4 (OT)

== See also ==
- National Collegiate Women's Ice Hockey Championship
- 2010–11 CHA women's ice hockey season
- 2010–11 ECAC women's ice hockey season
- 2010–11 Hockey East women's ice hockey season
- 2010–11 WCHA women's ice hockey season
