= 2010–11 Cornell Big Red women's ice hockey season =

ECAC Regular Season champs ECAC tournament champs Frozen Four, Lost, 1-4 vs. Boston University
- Conference: 1st ECAC
- Home ice: Lynah Rink

Rankings
- USCHO.com/CBS College Sports: 4

Record
- Overall: 31-3-1
- Home: 10-1-0
- Road: 3-0-0
- Neutral: 0-1-0

Coaches and captains
- Head coach: Doug Derraugh
- Assistant coaches: Danielle Bilodeau; Edith Zimmering
- Captain: Amber Overguard
- Alternate captain(s): Karlee Overguard, Rebecca Johnston

The 2010–11 Cornell Big Red women's ice hockey team represented Cornell University in the 2010–11 NCAA Division I women's ice hockey season. The Big Red was coached by Doug Derraugh and assisted by Dani Bilodeau and Edith Zimmering. The Big Red is a member of the Eastern College Athletic Conference and was semifinalist at the NCAA Women's Ice Hockey Championship. The Big Red were ranked eighth nationally, had a 17–8–6 overall, and posted a 14–2–6 record in ECAC Hockey last season. All of their home games were played at Lynah Rink.

== Offseason ==
- August 15: Eight players were selected for the Canadian U-22 team roster The players include: forwards Rebecca Johnston, Brianne Jenner, Catherine White, Jessica Campbell, and Chelsea Karpenko. The defense includes Laura Fortino and Lauriane Rougeau. Amanda Mazzotta was selected as a goaltender.
- Cornell head coach Doug Derraugh participated in the evaluation camp for the senior 2010–11 Canadian national women's team. He was a head coach for Canada Blue (the camp was divided into four teams, Red, White, Yellow, Blue). Jessica Campbell played for Canada Red, Brianne Jenner, Rebecca Johnston, Catherine White and goalie Amanda Mazzotta played for Canada White. Laura Fortino, Lauriane Rougeau and Chelsea Karpenko played for Canada Blue.
- September 28: In the USA Today/USA Hockey Magazine Women's College Hockey Poll, the Big Red were voted as the pre-season Number 2.

== Exhibition ==
Date	Opponent	Time	Score	Big Red scorers
10/15/2010	Etobicoke	7:00 ET	6-0	Rebecca Johnston (2), Brianne Jenner, Jessica Campbell, Hayley Hughes

== Regular season ==
- Jessica Campbell scored four goals against the Robert Morris Colonials in a 9–1 triumph. Two of her scores came on the power play.
- Oct 29-30: Brianne Jenner factored in both victories for the Big Red over the weekend. On October 29, she had three assists at Quinnipiac. The following day, she notched a pair of goals and added an assist Saturday at Princeton. Amanda Mazzotta allowed only two goals in two games. On October 29, versus Quinnipiac, she stopped 24 of 25 shots. The following day, she stopped 18 of 19 as the Big Red bested Princeton.
- January 7–8: Cornell freshman goaltender Lauren Slebodnik earned two shutouts in her first two career starts. On January 7, she made her NCAA debut by shutting out Yale by a 5–0 margin. With Cornell dressing just 12 skaters, she stopped all 23 Yale shots. The following night, Slebodnik shut out the Brown Bears by a 3–0 mark. Cornell only dressed 11 skaters for the game and she stopped all 15 shots.
- Jan 18: Cornell senior Karlee Overguard scored twice, while freshman Lauren Slebodnick made 24 saves to secure a 3–0 victory at Mercyhurst. The win for Cornell avenged the only loss for the Big Red on the season, a 4–3 loss to the Lakers back in November at Lynah Rink. Mercyhurst goaltender Hillary Pattenden stopped 29 of the 32 shots she faced on the night in taking the loss.
- In January 2011, for the second time in three weeks, Slebodnik was named the ECAC Hockey Goaltender of the Week. She claimed the honor after another week that saw her post a pair of shutouts in three games, including a 3–0 victory versus Number Four ranked Mercyhurst on January 18. The shutout victory versus Mercyhurst marked the first time in nearly two years that the club was shut out. In addition, it was the first time since October 2005 that Mercyhurst had been shut out during the regular season.

She made 24 saves in the victory versus Mercyhurst. She followed by making 12 saves on 13 shots on January 21 in a 6-1 win against Colgate. The following day, she finished her week with her fourth shutout of the year in six starts. She made 14 saves in a 5-0 win over Colgate.

With the three straight wins, Cornell extended their winning streak to 16 straight contests. During the regular season, they were unbeaten in ECAC Hockey action. Slebodnick filled in for junior Amanda Mazzotta during the month of January while Mazzotta was out with an injury. With Mazzotta, the goaltending duo together claimed five of the nine goaltender of the week awards handed out by the league during weeks that Cornell played.

=== Standings ===
2010–11 Eastern College Athletic Conference standings
	Conference							Overall					
	GP	W	L	T	PTS	GF	GA	GP	W	L	T	GF	GA
#2 Cornell†*	22	20	1	1	41			35	31	3	1		
Harvard	22	14	5	3	31			32	17	11	4		
Dartmouth	22	15	7	0	30			8	5	3	0		
Princeton	22	13	8	1	27			31	16	14	1		
Quinnipiac	22	12	9	1	25			37	22	12	3		
Clarkson	22	10	8	4	24			37	14	17	6		
St. Lawrence	22	11	11	0	22			7	4	3	0		
Rensselaer	22	8	12	2	18			9	4	3	1		
Colgate	22	8	12	2	18			33	11	19	3		
Yale	22	8	12	2	18			29	9	17	3		
Brown	22	1	17	4	6			29	2	23	4		
Union	22	1	19	2	4			34	2	29	3		
Championship: Cornell † indicates conference regular season champion * indicates conference tournament champion Current rankings: USCHO.com Division I women's poll

=== Roster ===
Number	Name	Position	Height	Class
2	Alyssa Gagliardi	D	5-5	Fr.
4	Kendice Ogilvie	F	5-7	Jr.
6	Olivia Cook	F	5-3	Fr.
7	Lauriane Rougeau	D	5-8	So.
8	Jessica Campbell	F	5-4	Fr.
9	Xandra Hompe	F	5-8	So.
11	Brianne Jenner	F	5-9	Fr.
13	Amanda Young	D	5-6	Jr.
16	Rebecca Johnston (**A**)	F	5-4	Jr.
19	Hayley Hughes	F	5-6	Sr.
20	Catherine White	F	5-9	Jr.
21	Amber Overguard (**C**)	D/F	5-8	Sr.
23	Jenna Paulson	D	5-9	Jr.
24	Hayleigh Cudmore	D	5-4	Fr.
26	Chelsea Karpenko	F	5-6	Jr.
27	Karlee Overguard (**A**)	F	5-8	Sr.
29	Amanda Mazzotta	G	5-5	Jr.
30	Lauren Slebodnick	G	5-8	Fr.
35	Katie Wilson	G	5-6	Sr.
77	Laura Fortino	D	5-6	So.

=== Schedule ===
Date	Opponent	Location	Time	Score	Cornell scorers	Record	Conf. record
10/22/2010	Robert Morris University (nc)	James Lynah Rink	7:00 p.m.	3-2	Catherine White, Hayley Hughes, Amanda Young	1-0-0	0-0-0
10/23/2010	Robert Morris University (nc)	James Lynah Rink	2:00 p.m.	9-1		2-0-0	0-0-0
10/29/2010	at Quinnipiac University	Hamden, CT	7:00 p.m.	5-1		3-0-0	1-0-0
10/30/2010	at Princeton University	Princeton, NJ	4:00 p.m.	5-1		4-0-0	2-0-0
11/2/2010	Mercyhurst College (nc)	James Lynah Rink	7:00 p.m.	3-4 (OT)		4-1-0	2-0-0
11/5/2010	**Harvard University**	James Lynah Rink	7:00 p.m.	3-0		5-1-0	3-0-0
11/6/2010	**Dartmouth College**	James Lynah Rink	4:00 p.m.	6-1		6-1-0	4-0-0
11/19/2010	**Princeton University**	James Lynah Rink	3:00 p.m.	1-0		7-1-0	5-0-0
11/20/2010	**Quinnipiac University**	James Lynah Rink	3:00 p.m.	4-0		8-1-0	6-0-0
11/26/2010	Niagara University (nc)	James Lynah Rink	7:00 p.m.	6-0		9-1-0	7-0-0
11/27/2010	Niagara University (nc)	James Lynah Rink	4:00 p.m.	6-0		10-1-0	8-0-0
11/30/2010	at Syracuse University (nc)	Syracuse, NY	7:00 p.m.	4-1		11-1-0	8-0-0
12/3/2010	**St. Lawrence University**	James Lynah Rink	3:00 p.m.	3-1		12-1-0	9-0-0
12/4/2010	**Clarkson University**	James Lynah Rink	3:00 p.m.	3-0		13-1-0	10-0-0
1/7/2011	at Yale University	New Haven, CT	7:00 p.m.				
1/8/2011	at Brown University	Providence, RI	4:00 p.m.				
1/14/2011	at Rensselaer Polytechnic Institute	Troy, NY	7:00 p.m.				
1/15/2011	at Union College	Schenectady, NY	4:00 p.m.				
1/18/2011	at Mercyhurst College (nc)	Erie, PA	7:00 p.m.				
1/21/2011	**Colgate University**	James Lynah Rink	7:00 p.m.				
1/22/2011	at Colgate University	Hamilton, NY	4:00 p.m.				
1/28/2011	**Union College**	James Lynah Rink	7:00 p.m.				
1/29/2011	**Rensselaer Polytechnic Institute**	James Lynah Rink	4:00 p.m.				
2/4/2011	at Clarkson University	Potsdam, NY	7:00 p.m.				
2/5/2011	at St. Lawrence University	Canton, NY	4:00 p.m.				
2/11/2011	**Brown University**	James Lynah Rink	7:00 p.m.				
2/12/2011	**Yale University**	James Lynah Rink	4:00 p.m.				
2/18/2011	at Dartmouth College	Hanover, NH	7:00 p.m.	2-4	Karlee Overguard, Hayley Hughes		
2/19/2011	at Harvard University	Cambridge, MA	4:00 p.m.				

(nc) stands for non-conference

Home Games in BOLD

==== Conference record ====
CHA school	Record
Brown	
Clarkson	1-0
Colgate	
Dartmouth	1-1
Harvard	1-0
Quinnipiac	2-0
Princeton	2-0
RPI	
St. Lawrence	1-0
Union	
Yale	

== Player stats ==
= Indicates team leader

=== Skaters ===
Player	Games	Goals	Assists	Points	Points/game	PIM	GWG	PPG	SHG
Rebecca Johnston									

=== Goaltenders ===
Player	Games played	Minutes	Goals against	Wins	Losses	Ties	Shutouts	Save %
Amanda Mazzotta								
Katie Wilson								

== Postseason ==
- March 12: The Big Red advanced to their second consecutive Frozen Four with a 7-1 defeat of Dartmouth in the NCAA regional.

The team matched an NCAA tournament record for goals in a game. The Big Red's 31 victories are the most by any Big Red hockey team, men's or women's, surpassing the 30-win men's hockey team of 2002-03 that advanced to the Frozen Four. Chelsea Karpenko scored two goals and had an assist, while Catherine White had one goal and two assists.

=== ECAC tournament ===
Date	Opponent	Location	Score	Cornell scorers	Notes
02/25/2011	RPI	James Lynah Rink	3-2 (OT)	Catherine White, Rebecca Johnston, Karlee Overguard	Big Red lead quarterfinals 1-0
02/26/2011	RPI	James Lynah Rink	6-1	Rebecca Johnston (3), Chelsea Karpenko (2)	Cornell wins series 2-0
03/03/2011	Quinnipiac	James Lynah Rink	4-3	Jessica Campbell, Chelsea Karpenko, Hayley Hughes (2)	Cornell advances to finals
03/05/2011	Dartmouth	James Lynah Rink	3-0	Chelsea Karpenko (2), Hayley Hughes	Chelsea Karpenko named Most Outstanding Player

=== NCAA tournament ===
Frozen Four; March 19
1	Wisconsin	3
4	Boston College	2
2	Cornell	1
3	Boston University	4

Championship Game; March 20
1	Wisconsin	4
3	Boston University	1

== Awards and honors ==
- Jessica Campbell, MLX Skates Rookie of the Week (Week of October 26)
- Jessica Campbell, MLX Skates Rookie of the Week (Week of March 7)
- Hayley Hughes, MLX Skates Player of the Week (Week of March 7)
- Brianne Jenner, ECAC MLX Skates Rookie of the Week (Week of November 2, 2010)
- Brianne Jenner, ECAC MLX Skates Rookie of the Week (Week of February 1, 2011)
- Brianne Jenner, ECAC MLX Skates Rookie of the Week (Week of March 1, 2011)
- Rebecca Johnston, ECAC Player of the Week (Week of January 11, 2011)
- Rebecca Johnston, ECAC Player of the Week (Week of March 1, 2011)
- Amanda Mazzotta, ECAC MLX Skates Goaltender of the Week (Week of November 2, 2010)
- Amanda Mazzotta, ECAC MLX Skates Goaltender of the Week (Week of November 23, 2010)
- Amanda Mazzotta, ECAC MLX Skates Goaltender of the Week (Week of March 7, 2011)
- Amanda Mazzotta, Winter 2011 All-Ivy Academic Team
- Karlee Overguard, ECAC co-Defensive Forward of the Year
- Lauriane Rougeau, ECAC top Defensive Defenseman
- Lauren Slebodnik, ECAC MLX Skates Rookie of the Week (Week of January 11, 2011)
- Lauren Slebodnik, ECAC MLX Skates Rookie of the Week (Week of January 25, 2011)

=== Team awards ===
- Laura Fortino, Robert D. "Bob" Brunet '41 Most Valuable Player
- Hayley Hughes and Karlee Overguard, Helanie Fisher Hebble '84 Unsung Hero award
- Hayley Hughes, Kate Hallada Pinhey '83 Most Improved Player Award
- Hayley Hughes, Jenna Paulson and Lauriane Rougeau, Wendell Earle Academic Award

- Amber Overguard and Amanda Mazzotta, William F. Fuerst, Jr., '39 Big Red Player of the Year Award
- Catherine White, TGHA Cub Club Mentor Award
- Brianne Jenner, Class of '41 Rookie of the Year

=== All-ECAC honors ===
- Doug Derraugh, ECAC Coach of the Year

==== First team ====
- Forward: Rebecca Johnston, Cornell
- Forward: Brianne Jenner, Cornell
- Defense: Laura Fortino, Cornell
- Defense: Lauriane Rougeau, Cornell

==== Second team ====
- Forward: Chelsea Karpenko, Cornell

==== Third team ====
- Forward: Catherine White, Cornell

==== All-rookie team ====
- Forward: Brianne Jenner, Cornell
- Defense: Alyssa Gagliardi, Cornell

=== Postseason honors ===
- Chelsea Karpenko, ECAC tournament Most Outstanding Player
- Doug Derraugh, Finalist, 2011 AHCA Women's Ice Hockey Division I Coach of the Year

=== All-America selections ===
- Laura Fortino, 2011 First Team All-America selection
- Rebecca Johnston, 2011 Second Team All-America selection
- Lauriane Rougeau, 2011 Second Team All-America selection

=== Ivy League honors ===
- Laura Fortino, 2010-11 Ivy League Player of the Year
- Brianne Jenner, 2010-11 Ivy League Rookie of the Year
- Brianne Jenner, 2010-11 First Team All-Ivy
- Rebecca Johnston, 2010-11 First Team All-Ivy
- Chelsea Karpenko, 2010-11 First Team All-Ivy
- Laura Fortino, 2010-11 First Team All-Ivy
- Catherine White, 2010-11 Second Team All-Ivy
- Lauriane Rougeau, 2010-11 Second Team All-Ivy

== See also ==
- 2010–11 College Hockey America women's ice hockey season
- 2010–11 ECAC women's ice hockey season
- 2009–10 Cornell Big Red women's ice hockey season
