= 2010–11 Harvard Crimson women's ice hockey season =

- Conference: ECAC
- Home ice: Bright Hockey Center

Record

Coaches and captains
- Head coach: Katey Stone

The 2010–11 Harvard Crimson women's ice hockey team represented Harvard University in the 2010–11 NCAA Division I women's ice hockey season.

== Offseason ==
- September 17:Three Crimson players (two former) have made the U.S. Women's Select Team roster that will compete in the Four Nations Cup in November 2010. Julie Chu and Caitlin Cahow are the two Crimson alumni. Sophomore Josephine Pucci has been named as a member of the team. Katey Stone will be the head coach of Team USA.

=== Exhibition ===
Date	Opponent	Score
Oct. 23	McGill	2-2

- October 23: The Harvard women's hockey team took a 2-1 lead into the third period but allowed a goal for a 2-2 tie at Bright Hockey Center. McGill took advantage of a five-on-three situation early in the first period as Cathy Chartrand took a feed from Gillian Ferrari and beat Bellamy for a 1-0 lead. Harvard had several opportunities on the power play in the 17th minute, but could not score on McGill netminder Andrea Wickman. With less than a minute to play in the game, McGill pulled its goaltender. With an extra skater, Ann-Sophie Bettez and Leslie Oles almost scored. In the end, Katia Clement-Hydra converted from close range to tie the score at 2-2. The overtime stanza did not result in a game-winning goal.

== Regular season ==
- Crimson skater Liza Ryabkina from Ukraine scored three goals in two games to open the season. Against archrival Yale. This weekend, Ryabinka scored two goals. Her second goal came with 14 seconds left in regulation and forced overtime. The second game was versus the Brown Bears and Ryabkina scored in the second period.
- January 15: A pair of quick goals to start the third period was all the offense the Crimson required. The Bright Hockey Center saw the defense preserve a 2-1 victory over St. Lawrence.
- January 22: In front of a crowd of prominent alumnae and Harvard Olympians, the women's hockey team collected its fourth consecutive win. The Crimson defeated Union by a 4-0 tally at Bright Hockey Center. Gina McDonald netted her first collegiate goal in the game.

=== Standings ===
2010–11 Eastern College Athletic Conference standings
	Conference							Overall					
	GP	W	L	T	PTS	GF	GA	GP	W	L	T	GF	GA
#2 Cornell†*	22	20	1	1	41			35	31	3	1		
Harvard	22	14	5	3	31			32	17	11	4		
Dartmouth	22	15	7	0	30			8	5	3	0		
Princeton	22	13	8	1	27			31	16	14	1		
Quinnipiac	22	12	9	1	25			37	22	12	3		
Clarkson	22	10	8	4	24			37	14	17	6		
St. Lawrence	22	11	11	0	22			7	4	3	0		
Rensselaer	22	8	12	2	18			9	4	3	1		
Colgate	22	8	12	2	18			33	11	19	3		
Yale	22	8	12	2	18			29	9	17	3		
Brown	22	1	17	4	6			29	2	23	4		
Union	22	1	19	2	4			34	2	29	3		
Championship: Cornell † indicates conference regular season champion * indicates conference tournament champion Current rankings: USCHO.com Division I women's poll

=== Schedule ===
Date	Opponent	Location	Time	Score	Record	Harvard scorers

==== Conference record ====
CHA school	Record
Brown	
Clarkson	
Cornell	
Colgate	
Dartmouth	
Quinnipiac	
Princeton	
RPI	
St. Lawrence	
Union	
Yale	

== Player stats ==
= Indicates team leader

=== Skaters ===
Player	Games	Goals	Assists	Points	Points/game	PIM	GWG	PPG	SHG

=== Goaltenders ===
Player	Games played	Minutes	Goals against	Wins	Losses	Ties	Shutouts	Save %

== Awards and honors ==
- Liza Ryabkina, Harvard ECAC MLX Skates Player of the Week (Week of November 2, 2010)
- Josephine Pucci, 2010-11 New England Women's Division I All-Stars

=== ECAC honors ===
- Jillian Dempsey, 2010-11 All-ECAC honors

=== Ivy League honors ===
- Jillian Dempsey, 2010-11 All-Ivy League second-team honors
