= 2010–11 St. Lawrence Saints women's ice hockey season =

- Conference: Not ranked ECAC
- Home ice: Appleton Arena

Rankings
- USA Today/USA Hockey Magazine: Not ranked

Record
- Overall: 7-8-2

Coaches and captains
- Head coach: Chris Wells
- Assistant coaches: Ted Wisner; Mare MacDougall
- Captain: Karell Emard
- Alternate captain(s): Kirsten Roach and Jamie Goldsmith

The 2010–11 St. Lawrence Saints women's hockey team represented St. Lawrence University in the 2010–11 NCAA Division I women's hockey season. The Saints were coached by Chris Wells and played their home games at Appleton Arena. The Saints are a member of the Eastern College Athletic Conference and attempt to win the NCAA Women's Ice Hockey Championship.

== Offseason ==
- Sept. 24: The Skating Saints have been ranked fifth in the preseason ECAC Hockey Poll. The poll is voted on by the conference's coaches.

=== Recruiting ===
- Rylee Smith, Forward, (5'5, Hagersville, ON)
- Dallas Boyd, Forward, (5'6, Hamilton, ON)
- Dayle Wilkinson, Defence, (5'5, Stouffville, ON)
- Bailey Habscheid, Defence, (5'5, Wymark, SK)
- Mel Desrochers, Defence, (5'4, Welland, ON)
- Caitlyn Lahonen, Goaltender (5'10, Warman, SK)

=== Exhibition ===
Date	Opponent	Score
Oct. 1	McGill	2-1

== Regular season ==
- October 15: Rookie goalie Caitlyn Lahonen made a career-high 30 saves versus Clarkson. She made 12 saves in the third period including three breakaway stops as the game finished in a 1–1 tie.
- December 10: Vanessa Emond accumulated four points (two goals, two assists) as the Skating Saints upset the Mercyhurst Lakers. She scored the opening goal of the game at 6:34 on the power play. In the second period, she would score another goal to extend the lead to 5-0. The four point effort was a career high for Emond.
- January: Assistant captain Britni Smith has already set a new career-high with 25 points this season behind 8 goals and 17 assists. Smith has already climbed to No. 2 on the all-time defenseman scoring list in St. Lawrence University history with 74 career points, behind only Annie Guay with 103. In addition, Smith is only five goals shy of Guay’s career record (25).
- January 8: The Saints outshot Princeton 30-21 at Appleton Arena but were bested by a 3-1 tally. Tigers goalie Rachel Weber made 29 saves to preserve the win. Rookie Caitlyn Lahonen made 16 saves for the Saints, while senior assistant captain Karell Emard scored the home team's lone goal.
- January 15: The Saints snapped a four-game losing skid with two third period goals to pull away from Dartmouth College by a 4-2 mark. Sophomore Kelly Sabatine had two goals including the game-winner. Maxie Weisz matched a season-high 34 saves. The win was the first for St. Lawrence in 2011. St. Lawrence was 1-for-2 mark on the power play and did not take a penalty the entire game.

=== Standings ===
2010–11 Eastern College Athletic Conference standings
	Conference							Overall					
	GP	W	L	T	PTS	GF	GA	GP	W	L	T	GF	GA
#2 Cornell†*	22	20	1	1	41			35	31	3	1		
Harvard	22	14	5	3	31			32	17	11	4		
Dartmouth	22	15	7	0	30			8	5	3	0		
Princeton	22	13	8	1	27			31	16	14	1		
Quinnipiac	22	12	9	1	25			37	22	12	3		
Clarkson	22	10	8	4	24			37	14	17	6		
St. Lawrence	22	11	11	0	22			7	4	3	0		
Rensselaer	22	8	12	2	18			9	4	3	1		
Colgate	22	8	12	2	18			33	11	19	3		
Yale	22	8	12	2	18			29	9	17	3		
Brown	22	1	17	4	6			29	2	23	4		
Union	22	1	19	2	4			34	2	29	3		
Championship: Cornell † indicates conference regular season champion * indicates conference tournament champion Current rankings: USCHO.com Division I women's poll

=== Schedule ===
Date	Opponent	Score	Goal scorers
Feb. 11	Dartmouth	2-3	Vanessa Emond, Alley Bero

==== Conference record ====
CHA school	Record
Brown	
Clarkson	
Colgate	
Cornell	
Dartmouth	
Harvard	
Quinnipiac	
Princeton	
RPI	
Union	
Yale	

== Awards and honors ==
- Alley Bero, St. Lawrence, MLX Skates ECAC Player of the Week (Week of November 23)
- Vanessa Emond, St. Lawrence, MLX Skates ECAC Player of the Week (Week of December 14, 2010)
- Bailey Habscheid, St. Lawrence, MLX Skates ECAC Rookie of the Week (Week of November 23)
- Kelly Sabatine, St. Lawrence, MLX Skates Player of the Week (Week of January 18, 2011)

== See also ==
- 2009–10 St. Lawrence Skating Saints women's ice hockey season
