= 2010–11 Quinnipiac Bobcats women's ice hockey season =

Nutmeg Classic champions
- Conference: ECAC

Rankings
- USA Today/USA Hockey Magazine: Not ranked
- USCHO.com/CBS College Sports: Not ranked

Record
- Overall: 22–12–3

Coaches and captains
- Head coach: Rick Seeley
- Captain: Jordan Elkins
- Alternate captain(s): Kelsey Britton, Kelley Davies, Kate Wheeler

The Quinnipiac Bobcats represent Quinnipiac University in ECAC Hockey. The Bobcats were not able to qualify for the NCAA tournament for the first time in school history. The Bobcats won more than 20 games for the first time in program history (setting a program record with 22 victories) and reached the ECAC Hockey semifinals.

== Offseason ==
=== Recruiting ===
Player	Nationality	Position	Notes
Shelby Wignall	Canada	Defense	Helped Stoney Creek Intermediate AA Sabers to a 49–21–6 record and a PWHL Bronze Medal
Kelly Babstock	Canada	Forward	In 2009–10, helped the Toronto Jr. Aeros of Provincial Women's Hockey League to Gold Medal and Alumni Cup
Lindsay Burman	United States	Forward	Helped the Minnesota Thoroughbreds of the JWHL to a second-place finish
Erica Uden Johansson	Sweden	Forward	Played in the 2010 Olympics with Swedish women's hockey team Was a 2010 Swedish champion gold medalist with Segeltorp
Elena Orlando	United States	Forward	Played for Shattuck-St. Mary's, part of a national championship in 2009 and a runner-up finish in 2010.
Kelly Lavallee	United States	Defense	Won the Hockey Night In Boston Top Defenseman award in 2009
Emily MacKinnon	Canada	Forward	Three-time team Most Valuable Player at Kent, CT school
Kara Gust	United States	Defense	Contributed to Chicago Mission Tier I Elite MWHL Champions State Championship and Third-Place national finish
Megan Hagg	Canada	Forward	Played for Toronto Jr. Aeros of the Provincial Women's Hockey League
Amanda Collin	United States	Forward	Minnesota Ms. Hockey Award Top Ten finalist Wendy's Heisman Female Award Winner from Burnsville High School, also being receiving the school's Outstanding Athlete Award.
Olivia Brackett	United States	Forward	Helped the Detroit Little Caesars AAA girls hockey team to a state championship

== Exhibition ==
Date	Opponent	Time	Score	Goal scorers
September 24, 2010	Ontario Hockey Academy	7:00 ET	Qpac, 3–1	Kelly Babstock (2), Lindsay Burman

== News and notes ==
=== October ===
- Kelly Babstock tallied one goal (the first of the season) and one assist in a 3–0 victory over Niagara. On October 2, she scored a goal and two assists in a 3–1 win over Niagara.
- Kate Wheeler scored two goals in a 3–0 victory against Niagara on October 1. The next day, she picked up an assist in a 3–1 victory over Niagara
- Erica Uden Johansson scored one goal and had one assist on October 9 against the Northeastern in a 4–0 win. The following day, Johansson had three goals against Sacred Heart in a 5–0 victory.
- In the first two games, Victoria Vigilanti made a total of 44 saves on 45 shots. On October 1, she stopped 20 shots in a 3–0 shutout of Niagara. The next day, she made 24 saves in a 3–1 win versus Niagara.
- On October 9, Victoria Vigilanti made 27 saves for her second shutout of the season. It was a 4–0 win over Northeastern. The following day, she turned away 13 shots in a 5–0 victory against Sacred Heart. She turned away 40 of 40 shots.
- October 15–16: Regan Boulton registered three goals and two assist. In a 4–2 win versus the Maine Black Bears, she registered her first-career hat trick.

=== November ===
- November 12–13: Kelly Babstock made Quinnipiac hockey history as she accounted for six of the seven goals scored over the weekend. Babstock registered back to back hat tricks against ECAC opponents (No. 10 ranked Harvard and Dartmouth). In addition, she is the first skater in Quinnipiac history to record two hat tricks in one season. As of November 14, Babstock led the team and the entire NCAA in goals (13) and points (27).
- Nov. 26: In the first game of the Nutmeg Classic, Quinnipiac beat Sacred Heart by a 9–1 tally. Kelly Babstock had two goals and four assists to set the school record for points (6) in a game. In addition, she set season records in points (30) and assists (17).
- Nov. 27: In the championship game of the Nutmeg Classic, Quinnipiac defeated Yale by a 2–1 mark. Brittany Lyons scored the game-winning goal as the Bobcats clinched its second ever Nutmeg Classic.

=== December ===
- On Friday, Dec 3 against Brown, Kelly Babstock became Quinnipiac's all-time leader in goals scored in a season by netting her 16th goal of the season. Babstock's nation leading sixth game-winning goal against Yale on Saturday, Dec 4 was part of a Bobcats 3–1 win. Vigilanti made a combined total of 39 saves in both weekend Bobcats’ victories. On Friday, Dec 3 against Brown, she turned away 17 shots in a 40 victory to earn her league-high fifth shutout of the season. On Saturday, Dec 4 against Yale, she made 22 saves in a 31 win recording her 12th victory of the season (1261).
- December 14: Quinnipiac women's ice hockey assistant coach Cassandra Turner was selected to serve as assistant coach for Canada at the 2011 IIHF World Women's Under-18 Championship.

=== January ===
- January 8: Kelly Babstock scored a hat trick, including the game-winning marker at 3:25 in overtime. Her goal lifted the Bobcats to a come from behind victory over ECAC Hockey opponent Clarkson.
- Kelly Babstock was featured in Sports Illustrated's Faces in the Crowd feature in the January 17, 2011 issue (as recognition of breaking several Quinnipiac scoring records).

== Regular season ==
=== Standings ===
2010–11 Eastern College Athletic Conference standings
	Conference							Overall					
	GP	W	L	T	PTS	GF	GA	GP	W	L	T	GF	GA
#2 Cornell†*	22	20	1	1	41			35	31	3	1		
Harvard	22	14	5	3	31			32	17	11	4		
Dartmouth	22	15	7	0	30			8	5	3	0		
Princeton	22	13	8	1	27			31	16	14	1		
Quinnipiac	22	12	9	1	25			37	22	12	3		
Clarkson	22	10	8	4	24			37	14	17	6		
St. Lawrence	22	11	11	0	22			7	4	3	0		
Rensselaer	22	8	12	2	18			9	4	3	1		
Colgate	22	8	12	2	18			33	11	19	3		
Yale	22	8	12	2	18			29	9	17	3		
Brown	22	1	17	4	6			29	2	23	4		
Union	22	1	19	2	4			34	2	29	3		
Championship: Cornell † indicates conference regular season champion * indicates conference tournament champion Current rankings: USCHO.com Division I women's poll

=== Schedule ===
Date	Opponent	Score	Goal scorers	Record	Conf record
Oct 1	Niagara	3–0	Kelly Babstock, Kate Wheeler (2)	1–0–0	0-0-0
Oct 2	Niagara	3–1	Erica Uden Johansson, Regan Boulton, Kelly Babstock	2–0–0	0-0-0
Oct 9	Northeastern	4–0	Kelly Babstock, Erica Uden Johansson, Jordan Elkins, Kate Wheeler	3–0–0	0-0-0
Oct 10	Sacred Heart	5–0	Erica Uden Johansson (3), Brittany Lyons, Kelly Babstock	4–0–0	0-0-0
Oct 15	Maine	4–2		5–0–0	0-0-0
Oct 16	Maine	2–4		5–1–0	0-0-0
Oct 22	Boston College				
Oct 29	Cornell				

==== Conference record ====
CHA school	Record
Brown	
Clarkson	
Colgate	
Cornell	
Dartmouth	
Harvard	
Princeton	
RPI	
St. Lawrence	
Union	
Yale	

== Postseason ==
- Victoria Vigilanti, Finalist, ECAC Goaltender of the Year Award

== Awards and honors ==
- Kelly Babstock, MLX Skates Rookie of the Week (Week of October 5)
- Kelly Babstock, MLX Skates Rookie of the Week, (Week of November 16)
- Kelly Babstock, MLX Skates Player of the Week (Week of December 7)
- Kelly Babstock, MLX Skates Rookie of the Week (Week of December 7)
- Kelly Babstock, MLX Skates Player of the Week (Week of February 15, 2011)
- Kelly Babstock, MLX Skates Rookie of the Week (Week of February 15, 2011)
- Kelly Babstock, 2011 Patty Kazmaier Award Nominee
- Kelly Babstock, 2010–11 ECAC Player of the Year
- Kelly Babstock, 2010–11 New England Women's Division I All-Star
- Erica Uden Johansson, MLX Skates Player of the Week (Week of October 12)
- Erica Uden Johansson, MLX Skates Rookie of the Week (Week of October 12)
- Victoria Vigilanti, MLX Skates Defensive Player of the Week (Week of October 5)
- Victoria Vigilanti, MLX Skates Defensive Player of the Week (Week of October 12)
- Victoria Vigilanti, MLX Skates Goaltender of the Week Week (Week of December 7)
- Victoria Vigilanti, MLX Skates Defensive Player of the Week (Week of February 8, 2011)
- Victoria Vigilanti, MLX Skates Defensive Player of the Week (Week of March 1, 2011)
- Kate Wheeler, MLX Skates Player of the Week (Week of October 5)
- Kate Wheeler, MLX Skates Player of the Week (Week of October 26)

=== Team awards ===
- Kelly Babstock, 2010–11 Quinnipiac women's ice hockey Rookie of the Year
- Kelly Babstock, 2010–11 Quinnipiac women's ice hockey Most Valuable Player
- Bethany Dymarczyk, Most Outstanding Defensive Player
- Kelley Davies, Coaches Award
- Melissa Perry, Scholar-Athlete of the Year

== See also ==
- 2009–10 Quinnipiac Bobcats women's ice hockey season
