= 2010–11 Brown Bears women's ice hockey season =

- Conference: 11 ECAC
- Home ice: Meehan Auditorium

Rankings
- USA Today/USA Hockey Magazine: Not ranked
- USCHO.com/CBS College Sports: Not ranked

Record
- Overall: 2-23-4
- Home: 2-8-4
- Road: 0-15-0

Coaches and captains
- Head coach: Digit Murphy
- Assistant coaches: Sean Coady; Meagan Guckian
- Captain(s): Samantha Stortini, Erica Kromm

The Brown Bears represent Brown University in ECAC women's ice hockey. The Bears did not qualify for the NCAA tournament. The top scorers for the Bears were two sophomore forwards; Laurie Jolin, (10 goals, 7 assists), and Alena Polenska, (10 goals, 7 assists) shared the lead with 17 points, respectively.

== Offseason ==
- August 12: The Czech National women's ice hockey program announced that Bears sophomore Alena Polenska has been named captain for its Olympic Development Team.

=== Exhibition ===
Date	Team	Score	Goal scorers
Oct. 17	Etobicoke	5-2	Kelly Griffin, Jessica Hoyle, Alena Polenska

=== Recruiting ===
Player	Position	Nationality
Emilie Dolan	Forward	Canada
Jessica Hoyle	Forward	Canada
Kelly Kitridge	Defense	United States
Aubree Moore	Goaltender	United States
Jennifer Nedow	Defense	Canada
Vanessa Welten	Forward	Canada
Samantha Woodward	Defense	United States

== Regular season ==
- November 14: Kate Jamieson earned her first shutout of the season as the Bears defeated RPI by a 1-0 tally. The sophomore goaltender made thirty-seven saves.

=== Standings ===
2010–11 Eastern College Athletic Conference standings
	Conference							Overall					
	GP	W	L	T	PTS	GF	GA	GP	W	L	T	GF	GA
#2 Cornell†*	22	20	1	1	41			35	31	3	1		
Harvard	22	14	5	3	31			32	17	11	4		
Dartmouth	22	15	7	0	30			8	5	3	0		
Princeton	22	13	8	1	27			31	16	14	1		
Quinnipiac	22	12	9	1	25			37	22	12	3		
Clarkson	22	10	8	4	24			37	14	17	6		
St. Lawrence	22	11	11	0	22			7	4	3	0		
Rensselaer	22	8	12	2	18			9	4	3	1		
Colgate	22	8	12	2	18			33	11	19	3		
Yale	22	8	12	2	18			29	9	17	3		
Brown	22	1	17	4	6			29	2	23	4		
Union	22	1	19	2	4			34	2	29	3		
Championship: Cornell † indicates conference regular season champion * indicates conference tournament champion Current rankings: USCHO.com Division I women's poll

=== Schedule ===
Date	Opponent	Score	Goal scorers	Record	Conf record
Oct. 24	@ Boston College	2-5	Laurie Jolin, Katelyn Landry	0-1-0	
Oct. 29	@ Dartmouth	2-4	Erica Kromm, Vanessa Welten	0-2-0	
Oct. 30	@ Harvard	2-4			
Nov. 6	Sacred Heart	5-1			
Nov. 12	Union	1-1			
Nov. 13	RPI	1-0			
Nov. 19	Clarkson	1-1			
Nov. 20	St. Lawrence	2-5			
Nov. 26	Providence	2-3			
Dec. 3	@ Quinnipiac	0-4			
Dec. 4	@ Princeton	0-4			
Jan. 2					

==== Conference record ====
CHA school	Record
Cornell	
Clarkson	0-0-1
Colgate	
Dartmouth	0-1
Harvard	0-1
Quinnipiac	0-1
Princeton	0-1
RPI	1-0
St. Lawrence	0-1
Union	
Yale	

== Awards and honors ==
- Katie Jamieson, Brown, ECAC MLX Skates Defensive Player of the Week, (Week of November 16)

=== Team awards ===
- Team MVP: Samantha Stortini
- Academic Excellence Award: Katelyn Landry
- Chelsea McMillan Pride and Perseverance Award: Paige Pyatt
- Panda Cup: Erica Kromm
- Sakuma Award: Katelyn Landry, Katie Jamieson, Jennifer Nedow, Jessica Hoyle, and Kelly Kittredge
- Tara Mounsey Award: Samantha Woodward

== See also ==
- 2009–10 Brown Bears women's ice hockey season
