= 2010–11 Colgate Raiders women's ice hockey season =

Did not qualify,
- Conference: ECAC
- Home ice: Starr Rink

Rankings
- USA Today/USA Hockey Magazine: Not ranked
- USCHO.com/CBS College Sports: Not ranked

Record
- Overall: 11-19-3
- Home: 9-11-0
- Road: 2-8-3
- Neutral: 0-0-0

Coaches and captains
- Head coach: Scott Wiley
- Assistant coaches: Karen Thatcher; Ryan Stone; Karine Senecal

The Colgate Raiders represented Colgate University in the 2010–11 NCAA Division I women's ice hockey season. The Raiders head coach was Scott Wiley. Assisting him were Ryan Stone, Karine Senecal, and Karen Thatcher.

== Offseason ==
- May 26, 2010: 2010 Winter Olympian Karen Thatcher has been named an assistant coach

=== Exhibition ===
| Date | Opponent | Score | Goal scorers |
|---|---|---|---|
| Sept. 25 | Bluewater (PWHL) | 7-1 | Jordan Brickner (2), Rebecca Walsh, Jocelyn Simpson, Jenna Klynstra, Jacquie Colborne and Hannah Milan |
| Oct. 2 | University of Ottawa | 7-1 | Jacquie Colborne (2), Brittany Phillips (2), Taylor Volpe, Rachel Walsh, Kristi-Lyn Pollock |

== Regular season ==
- Kimberley Sass recorded 27 saves in a 5-3 win over the Connecticut Huskies. With the win, she is 2-0 overall along with one shutout.
- January 28: The Colgate women's hockey team raised $12,000 in autism research with its Autism Awareness Project. The Light Up Starr Rink Blue game against RPI on Friday, Jan. 28 attracted 1,038, all of whom were wearing light blue, the color of Autism Speaks. The team wore special puzzle-piece jerseys designed by OT Sports.
- February 11: Kimberly Sass recorded 26 saves in a 1-0 shutout over the Yale Bulldogs. It was Sass' fifth shutout of the season and third straight at home, both of which are new school records. The game winning goal was scored by Brittany Phillips.

=== Standings ===
2010–11 Eastern College Athletic Conference standings
| | Conference | | | | | | | Overall | | | | | |
| | GP | W | L | T | PTS | GF | GA | GP | W | L | T | GF | GA |
|---|---|---|---|---|---|---|---|---|---|---|---|---|---|
| #2 Cornell†* | 22 | 20 | 1 | 1 | 41 | | | 35 | 31 | 3 | 1 | | |
| Harvard | 22 | 14 | 5 | 3 | 31 | | | 32 | 17 | 11 | 4 | | |
| Dartmouth | 22 | 15 | 7 | 0 | 30 | | | 8 | 5 | 3 | 0 | | |
| Princeton | 22 | 13 | 8 | 1 | 27 | | | 31 | 16 | 14 | 1 | | |
| Quinnipiac | 22 | 12 | 9 | 1 | 25 | | | 37 | 22 | 12 | 3 | | |
| Clarkson | 22 | 10 | 8 | 4 | 24 | | | 37 | 14 | 17 | 6 | | |
| St. Lawrence | 22 | 11 | 11 | 0 | 22 | | | 7 | 4 | 3 | 0 | | |
| Rensselaer | 22 | 8 | 12 | 2 | 18 | | | 9 | 4 | 3 | 1 | | |
| Colgate | 22 | 8 | 12 | 2 | 18 | | | 33 | 11 | 19 | 3 | | |
| Yale | 22 | 8 | 12 | 2 | 18 | | | 29 | 9 | 17 | 3 | | |
| Brown | 22 | 1 | 17 | 4 | 6 | | | 29 | 2 | 23 | 4 | | |
| Union | 22 | 1 | 19 | 2 | 4 | | | 34 | 2 | 29 | 3 | | |
Championship: Cornell † indicates conference regular season champion * indicates conference tournament champion Current rankings: USCHO.com Division I women's poll

=== Schedule ===
| Date | Opponent | Score | Goal scorers |
|---|---|---|---|
| Oct. 8 | Boston College | 0-4 | None |
| Oct. 9 | New Hampshire | 1-0 (OT) | Brittany Phillips |
| Oct. 15 | Connecticut | 5-3 | Jocelyn Simpson, Hannah Milan, Jessica Hootz, Jenna Klynstra and Jacquie Colborne |
| Feb. 19 | Dartmouth | 3-4 | Shannon Doyle, Jenna Klynstra, Rachel Walsh |

==== Conference record ====
| CHA school | Record |
|---|---|
| Brown | 0-0-0 |
| Clarkson | 0-0-0 |
| Cornell | 0-0-0 |
| Dartmouth | 0-0-0 |
| Harvard | 0-0-0 |
| Quinnipiac | 0-0-0 |
| Princeton | 0-0-0 |
| RPI | 0-0-0 |
| St. Lawrence | 0-0-0 |
| Union | 0-0-0 |
| Yale | |

== Awards and honors ==
- Kimberly Sass, ECAC Defensive Player of the Week (Week of October 18, 2011)

=== Team awards ===
- Shannon Doyle, Rookie of the Year
- Meghan Wickens, Most Improved Player
- Heidi Peterson, Sportsmanship Award
- Brittany Phillips, Brad Houston Offensive MVP
- Amanda Kirwan, Defensive MVP
- Kimberly Sass, Marian Lefevre Coaches Award
- Jessi Waters, Don Palmateer Award
