= 2010–11 Princeton Tigers women's ice hockey season =

American college ice hockey team season

2011–12 Princeton Tigers women's ice hockey season
- Conference: ECAC
- Home ice: Hobey Baker Rink

Record
- Overall: 16–14–1

Coaches and captains
- Head coach: Jeff Kampersal

The Princeton Tigers women's hockey team represented Princeton University in the 2010–11 NCAA Division I women's ice hockey season.

== Recruiting ==
Player	Nationality	Position	Notes
Rose Alleva	United States	Defense	Runner-up for Minnesota Ms. Hockey Award as a senior
Sally Butler	Canada	Forward	Butler played for the Canadian U18 National Champion Ontario team
Gabie Figueroa	United States	Defense	She played high school hockey at The Lawrenceville School
Denna Laing	United States	Forward	She was a member of five ISL Championship winning teams at Nobles
Olivia Mucha	United States	Forward	Mucha lettered in hockey, field hockey and lacrosse at Hotchkiss

== News and notes ==
- Nov 6-7: Freshman Sally Butler had two goals (both game winners) and an assists as the Tigers won both weekend games. The first game was a 2-1 win over Rensselaer. The following day, Princeton faced a 2-0 deficit against the Union Dutchwomen. The Tigers would force overtime, where Butler scored the overtime winner. In all three of Princeton’s victories, Butler has scored the game-winning goals.

== Exhibition ==
Date	Opponent	Score	Goal scorers
October 15	McGill	3-4	Paula Romanchuk, Julie Johnson, Laura Martindale

== Regular season ==
- December 10–11: In both games versus Syracuse, Butler accumulated three goals. In the first game, a 4–2 triumph, Butler scored the first and fourth goals for the Tigers. The following day, Butler scored the Tigers' third goal of the game in a 5–0 shutout of the Syracuse Orange. In two games versus Syracuse, Weber won both games and had a goals against average of 1.00. On December 10, she stopped 23 of 25 shots. Both goals were allowed in the power play on the third period. The following day, she earned her second shutout of the season as she made 14 saves.
- December 31: Rachel Weber made 24 saves as the Tigers upset the fifth-ranked Boston College Eagles by a 3–0 margin. It was Weber’s third shutout in four games and her goals against average for the season was then lowered to 1.93
- January 3, 7–8: In three games played, Rachel Weber earned three victories and allowed only one goal. On January 3, she defeated Quinnipiac by a 3–0 tally and shut out Clarkson by a 2–0 score on January 7. The following day, she gave up her only goal of the week in a 3–1 win over St. Lawrence. Her shutout streak spanned six games and lasted 289:43. She is now the owner of the longest shutout streak in ECAC history and the fourth longest in NCAA Division I since the 2000–01 season.
- January 8: St. Lawrence outshot Princeton 30-21 at Appleton Arena but were bested by a 3–1 tally. Tigers goalie Rachel Weber made 29 saves to preserve the win.

=== Standings ===
2010–11 Eastern College Athletic Conference standings
	Conference							Overall					
	GP	W	L	T	PTS	GF	GA	GP	W	L	T	GF	GA
#2 Cornell†*	22	20	1	1	41			35	31	3	1		
Harvard	22	14	5	3	31			32	17	11	4		
Dartmouth	22	15	7	0	30			8	5	3	0		
Princeton	22	13	8	1	27			31	16	14	1		
Quinnipiac	22	12	9	1	25			37	22	12	3		
Clarkson	22	10	8	4	24			37	14	17	6		
St. Lawrence	22	11	11	0	22			7	4	3	0		
Rensselaer	22	8	12	2	18			9	4	3	1		
Colgate	22	8	12	2	18			33	11	19	3		
Yale	22	8	12	2	18			29	9	17	3		
Brown	22	1	17	4	6			29	2	23	4		
Union	22	1	19	2	4			34	2	29	3		
Championship: Cornell † indicates conference regular season champion * indicates conference tournament champion Current rankings: USCHO.com Division I women's poll

=== Schedule ===
Date	Opponent	Score	Goal scorers	Record	Conf record
Oct. 22	Northeastern	1-2	Paula Romanchuk	0-1-0	0-0-0
Oct. 23	Providence	0-4	None	0-2-0	0-0-0
Oct. 29	Colgate	2-0		1-2-0	1-0-0
Oct. 30	Cornell	1-5	Paula Romanchuk	1-3-0	1-1-0
Nov. 2	Quinnipiac	2-5		1-4-0	1-2-0
Nov. 5	RPI	2-1	Denna Laing, Sally Butler	2-4-0	2-2-0
Nov. 6	Union	3-2 (OT)	Sally Butler	3-4-0	3-2-0
Nov. 12	Dartmouth	2-3 (OT)		3-5-0	3-3-0
Nov. 13	Harvard	2-2		3-5-1	3-4-0
Nov. 19	Cornell	0-1	None	3-6-1	3-5-0
Nov. 20	Colgate	0-2	None		3-6-0

==== Conference record ====
CHA school	Record
Brown	
Clarkson	
Colgate	1-1-0
Cornell	0-2-0
Dartmouth	0-1-0
Harvard	0-0-1
Quinnipiac	1-0-0
RPI	1-0-0
St. Lawrence	
Union	1-0-0
Yale	

== Awards and honors ==
- Amy Bourbeau, 2011 AHCA Assistant Coach Award (inaugural winner)
- Sally Butler, ECAC Rookie of the Week (Week of November 9)
- Sally Butler, Princeton, MLX Skates ECAC Rookie of the Week (Week of December 14, 2010)
- Sasha Sherry, 2010-11 Second Team All-Ivy
- Rachel Weber, MLX Skates ECAC Defensive Player of the Week (Week of December 14, 2010)
- Rachel Weber, Princeton, MLX Skates Defensive Player of the Week (Week of January 4, 2011)
- Rachel Weber, Princeton, MLX Skates Defensive Player of the Week (Week of January 11, 2011)
- Rachel Weber, Finalist, ECAC Goaltender of the Year Award
- Rachel Weber, 2010-11 Second Team All-Ivy

== See also ==
- 2009–10 Princeton Tigers women's ice hockey season
