= 2010–11 Dartmouth Big Green women's ice hockey season =

Runner-up, ECAC tournament NCAA Regionals, Lost, 7–1 vs. Cornell
- Conference: 3 ECAC
- Home ice: Thompson Arena

Rankings
- USA Today/USA Hockey Magazine: 8

Record
- Overall: 22–12–0

Coaches and captains
- Head coach: Mark Hudak
- Assistant coaches: Sara Simard; Gabe Tash; Holley Tyng
- Captain: Katie Horner
- Alternate captain(s): Jenna Hobeika, Kelly Foley, Reagan Fischer

The 2010–11 Dartmouth women's ice hockey team represented Dartmouth College in the 2010–11 NCAA Division I women's ice hockey season. In the regular season, the Big Green were 19–9–0 overall and 15–7–0 in the ECAC.

== Offseason ==
- July 23: Former Dartmouth player Sarah Howald is named new head coach of Hockey Canada's National Women's Under-18 Team.
- September 15: Head coach Mark Hudak announced that senior defenseman Katie Horner is named the 64th captain in the history of the Big Green women's hockey program.
- September 20: Big Green head coach Mark Hudak is named as one of two assistant coaches for the U.S. Women's Select Team. The team competes in the 2010 Women's Four Nations Cup from November 8–14, in St. John's, Newfoundland.

=== Recruiting ===
Player	Nationality	Position	Notes
Ali Winkel	Canada	Forward	Competed for the Toronto Jr. Aeros of the Provincial Women's Hockey League
Lauren Kelly	Canada	Defense	Was a member of the Oakville Ice in the Provincial Women's Hockey League
Ellie Gleason	United States	Defense	Competed in ice hockey for four years at Edina High School and was the team captain as a senior
Lindsay Holcroft	United States	Goaltender	Awarded the Female Athlete of the Year Award at North Allegheny High School

== Exhibition ==
Date	Opponent	Score
Oct. 22	McGill	2-3

== Regular season ==
- November 13–14: Sasha Nanji has two game-winning goals in two consecutive games. On November 13, she registers a hat trick versus Princeton as the Big Green triumph by a 3–2 mark in overtime. The following day, the Big Green plays Quinnipiac and Nanji has two points, including the game-winning goal in overtime in a 4–3 win.
- For the week beginning January 14, 2011, Camille Dumais accumulates six points (three goals, three assists) in three victories. In a win versus Vermont, she registers one goal and two assists. Versus Union, she scores one goal, and then has a two-point game versus RPI. Freshman goalie Lindsay Holdcroft wins three consecutive games. During the streak, she has a goals against average of 0.67, a save percentage of .947 and makes a total of 65 saves. She plays 180 minutes and registers a shutout versus RPI.
- January 22, 2011: The Big Green shutout Rensselaer by a 3–0 mark at Thompson Arena, including two power play goals and an empty netter. It is the third straight win for Dartmouth, and improves the team to 12–8–0 overall and 8–6–0 in the conference. Lindsay Holdcroft earns the win and the shutout for the Big Green, making nine saves.
- January 28–29: Lindsay Holdcroft makes 51 saves, allows only one goal and records a shutout in two victories. The Big Green have five straight wins as the squad moves into third in the ECAC. In the five victories, Holdcroft allows only three goals. In her rookie season, she has three shutouts.
- February 11–12: Lindsay Holdcroft wins both games she played in. Versus St. Lawrence, she makes a career high 38 saves in a 3–2 win over St. Lawrence. The following day, she makes 19 saves in a 3–1 win over Clarkson.
- February 19: The Dartmouth women's hockey plays its final game of the regular season and defeats Colgate 4–3. The Big Green took a 3–0 lead six minutes into the second period. Erica Dobos opens the scoring with her fifth goal of the season. Jenna Hobeika scores her ninth goal of the season three minutes into the second period, followed by Kelly Foley three minutes later for her 17th of the season. Camille Dumais scores the game-winning goal after a quick pass from senior Amanda Trunzo. Lindsay Holdcroft finishes with 24 saves for her 15th win of the season.

=== Standings ===
2010–11 Eastern College Athletic Conference standings
	Conference							Overall					
	GP	W	L	T	PTS	GF	GA	GP	W	L	T	GF	GA
#2 Cornell†*	22	20	1	1	41			35	31	3	1		
Harvard	22	14	5	3	31			32	17	11	4		
Dartmouth	22	15	7	0	30			8	5	3	0		
Princeton	22	13	8	1	27			31	16	14	1		
Quinnipiac	22	12	9	1	25			37	22	12	3		
Clarkson	22	10	8	4	24			37	14	17	6		
St. Lawrence	22	11	11	0	22			7	4	3	0		
Rensselaer	22	8	12	2	18			9	4	3	1		
Colgate	22	8	12	2	18			33	11	19	3		
Yale	22	8	12	2	18			29	9	17	3		
Brown	22	1	17	4	6			29	2	23	4		
Union	22	1	19	2	4			34	2	29	3		
Championship: Cornell † indicates conference regular season champion * indicates conference tournament champion Current rankings: USCHO.com Division I women's poll

=== Schedule ===
Date	Opponent	Location	Time	Score	Record	Big Green scorers
Fri, Oct 29	BROWN *	Hanover, N.H.	4:30 pm	4-2	1–0–0	Sasha Nanji, Camille Dumais, Kelly Foley, Katie Horner
Sat, Oct 30	YALE *	Hanover, N.H.	4:00 pm	4–1	2–0–0	
Fri, Nov 05	Colgate *	at Hamilton, N.Y.	7:00 pm	6–2	3–0–0	
Sat, Nov 06	Cornell *	at Ithaca, N.Y.	4:00 pm	1–6	3–1–0	
Fri, Nov 12	Princeton *	at Princeton, N.J.	7:00 pm	3–2 (OT)	4–1–0	
Sat, Nov 13	Quinnipiac *	at Hamden, Conn.	4:00 pm	4–3 (OT)	5–1–0	
Tue, Nov 16	PROVIDENCE	Hanover, N.H.	7:00 pm	3–2	6–1–0	
Fri, Nov 19	Harvard *	at Cambridge, Mass.	7:00 pm	3–5	6–2–0	
Sat, Nov 20	HARVARD *	Hanover, N.H.	7:00 pm	2–3	6–3–0	
Wed, Nov 24	Boston College	at Chestnut Hill, Mass.	7:00 pm	2–4	6–4–0	
Sat, Dec 11	New Hampshire	at Durham, N.H.	2:00 pm	0–1		
Sat, Jan 01	Connecticut	Hanover, N.H.		9–2		
Sun, Jan 2	Connecticut	Hanover, N.H.		5–0		
Fri, Jan 07	Rensselaer *	at Troy, N.Y.		2–5		
Sat, Jan 08	Union	at Schenectady, N.Y.		4–1		
Fri, Jan 14	Clarkson	Hanover, N.H.		2–3 (OT)		
Sat, Jan 15	ST. LAWRENCE *	Hanover, N.H.		2–4		
Tue, Jan 18	Vermont	at Burlington, Vt.		5–1		
Fri, Jan 21	Union	Hanover, N.H.		5–1		
Sat, Jan 22	RENSSELAER *	Hanover, N.H.		3–0		
Fri, Jan 28	Yale	at New Haven, Conn.		2–1		
Sat. Jan 29	Brown	at Providence, RI		6–0		
Fri, Feb 04	QUINNIPIAC *	Hanover, N.H.		0–4		None
Sat, Feb 05	Princeton	Hanover, N.H.		7–0		Reagan Fischer, Jessica Gagner, Alyssa Boehm, Kelly Foley, Amanda Trunzo, Jenna Hobeika (2)
Fri, Feb 11	St. Lawrence *	at Canton, N.Y.		3–2		Kelly Foley (2), Moira Scanlon
Sat, Feb 12	Clarkson *	at Potsdam, N.Y.		3–1		Reagan Fischer, Sasha Nanji, Kelly Foley
Fri, Feb 18	Cornell *	Hanover, NH		4–2		Kelly Foley (2), Geneva Kilman, Camille Dumais
Sat, Feb 19	Colgate *	Hanover, NH		4–3		Erica Dobos, Jenna Hobeika, Kelly Foley, Camille Dumais

==== Conference record ====
CHA school	Record
Brown	2–0–0
Clarkson	1–1–0
Colgate	2–0–0
Cornell	1–1–0
Harvard	0–2–0
Quinnipiac	1–1–0
Princeton	2–0–0
RPI	1–1–0
St. Lawrence	1–1–0
Union	2–0–0
Yale	2–0–0

== Player stats ==
= Indicates team leader

=== Skaters ===
Player	Games	Goals	Assists	Points	Points/game	PIM	GWG	PPG	SHG

=== Goaltenders ===
Player	Games played	Minutes	Goals against	Wins	Losses	Ties	Shutouts	Save %

== Postseason ==
=== ECAC tournament ===
Date	Opponent	Score
February 27	Clarkson	4–3, OT
March 3	Harvard	4–1
March 5	Cornell	0–3

=== NCAA tournament ===
Date	Opponent	Score
March 12	Cornell	1–7

== Awards and honors ==
- Camille Dumais, ECAC MLX Skates Player of the Week (Week of January 25, 2011)
- Lindsay Holdcroft, ECAC MLX Skates Rookie of the Week (Week of January 4, 2011)
- Lindsay Holdcroft, ECAC MLX Skates Rookie of the Week (Week of January 25, 2011)
- Lindsay Holdcroft, MLX Skates Goalie of the Week (Week of February 22, 2011)
- Lindsay Holdcroft, Dartmouth Female Athlete of the Week (Week of January 31, 2011)
- Lindsay Holdcroft, MLX Skates Goalie of the Week (Week of February 15, 2011)
- Lindsay Holdcroft, MLX Skates Goalie of the Week (Week of February 22, 2011)
- Sasha Nanji, Dartmouth, ECAC MLX Skates Player of the Week, (Week of November 16)
- Amanda Trunzo, ECAC MLX Skates Player of the Week, (Week of February 22, 2011)

=== All-Ivy honors ===
- Kelly Foley, 2010–11 First Team All-Ivy
- Amanda Trunzo, 2010–11 Second Team All-Ivy
- Sasha Nanji, 2010–11 Honorable Mention All-Ivy
- Lindsay Holdcroft, 2010–11 Honorable Mention All-Ivy

=== New England hockey awards ===
- Mark Hudak, 2010–11 New England Women's CoachPlayer of the Year
- Kelly Foley, 2010–11 New England Women's Division I All-Stars
