= 2010–11 Clarkson Golden Knights women's ice hockey season =

- Conference: 6th ECAC
- Home ice: Cheel Arena

Record
- Overall: 14–17–6
- Home: 6–6–5
- Road: 8–11–1

Coaches and captains
- Head coach: Shannon Desrosiers and Matt Desrosiers
- Assistant coaches: Matt Kelly
- Captain: Courtney Olson
- Alternate captain(s): Kali Gillanders; Caitlin Oleksa; Katelyn Ptolemy; Melissa Waldie

The Clarkson Golden Knights women's ice hockey program represented Clarkson University during the 2010–11 NCAA women's ice hockey season. The Golden Knights secured their seventh consecutive appearance in the ECAC playoffs, but failed to qualify for their second NCAA tournament.

== Recruiting ==
Player	Position	Nationality	Notes
Vanessa Gagnon	Forward	Canada	Competed with Dawson Blues
Erica Howe	Goaltender	Canada	Competed with Ottawa Senators (PWHL)
Amanda Lucky	Forward	Canada	Competed with Ottawa Senators (PWHL)
Carly Mercer	Forward	Canada	Competed with Bluewater Jr. Hawks; Winner of gold medal at 2010 IIHF U18 Women’s Worlds
Shelby Nisbet	Defense	Canada	Competed with Swift Current Wildcats
Vanessa Plante	Defense	Canada	Competed with Limoilou Titans
Jamie Lee Rattray	Forward	Canada	Competed with Ottawa Senators (PWHL); Winner of silver medal at 2010 IIHF U18 Women’s Worlds; Winner of gold medal at 2010 IIHF U18 Women’s Worlds
Brittany Styner	Forward	Canada	Competed with Edge School Mountaineers

== Schedule ==
Date	Opponent^{#}	Rank^{#}	Site	Decision	Result	Record
Regular Season
September 24	Bluewater PWHL*		Cheel Arena • Potsdam, NY (exhibition)	Lauren Dahm	W 4–0	0–0–0
October 1	#4 Minnesota*	#7	Cheel Arena • Potsdam, NY	Lauren Dahm	L 0–5	0–1–0
October 2	#4 Minnesota	#7	Cheel Arena • Potsdam, NY	Lauren Dahm	L 0–3	0–2–0
October 9	at Connecticut*		Mark Edward Freitas Ice Forum • Storrs, CT	Lauren Dahm	L 1–3	0–3–0
October 10	at Providence*		Schneider Arena • Providence, RI	Lauren Dahm	L 0–5	0–4–0
October 15	St. Lawrence*		Cheel Arena • Potsdam, NY	Lauren Dahm	T 1–1 ^{OT}	0–4–1
October 16	at St. Lawrence*		Appleton Arena • Canton, NY	Lauren Dahm	W 3–2	1–4–1
October 22	at New Hampshire*		Whittemore Center • Durham, NH	Erica Howe	L 1–2	1–5–1
October 23	at #5 Boston University*		Walter Brown Arena • Boston, MA	Lauren Dahm	L 2–3	1–6–1
October 29	Union		Cheel Arena • Potsdam, NY	Erica Howe	W 3–0	2–6–1 (1–0–0)
October 30	RPI		Cheel Arena • Potsdam, NY	Lauren Dahm	W 2–1	3–6–1 (2–0–0)
November 5	at Syracuse*		Tennity Ice Skating Pavilion • Syracuse, NY	Lauren Dahm	W 3–2	4–6–1
November 12	Syracuse*		Cheel Arena • Potsdam, NY	Lauren Dahm	L 1–3	4–7–1
November 16	St. Lawrence		Cheel Arena • Potsdam, NY	Erica Howe	W 4–1	5–7–1 (3–0–0)
November 19	at Brown		Meehan Auditorium • Providence, RI	Erica Howe	T 1–1 ^{OT}	5–7–2 (3–0–1)
November 20	at Yale		Ingalls Rink • New Haven, CT	Erica Howe	L 2–3 ^{OT}	5–8–2 (3–1–1)
November 27	Vermont*		Cheel Arena • Potsdam, NY	Erica Howe	T 1–1 ^{OT}	5–8–3
November 28	Vermont*		Cheel Arena • Potsdam, NY	Lauren Dahm	W 4–0	6–8–3
December 3	at Colgate		Starr Arena • Hamilton, NY	Lauren Dahm	L 2–5	6–9–3 (3–2–1)
December 4	at #1 Cornell		Lynah Rink • Ithaca, NY	Erica Howe	L 0–3	6–10–3 (3–3–1)
January 7	Princeton		Cheel Arena • Potsdam, NY	Erica Howe	L 0–2	6–11–3 (3–4–1)
January 8	Quinnipiac		Cheel Arena • Potsdam, NY	Lauren Dahm	L 2–3 ^{OT}	6–12–3 (3–5–1)
January 14	at Dartmouth		Thompson Arena • Hanover, NH	Erica Howe	W 3–2 ^{OT}	7–12–3 (4–5–1)
January 15	at Harvard		Bright-Landry Hockey Center • Allston, MA	Lauren Dahm	L 2–3	7–13–3 (4–6–1)
January 21	Yale		Cheel Arena • Potsdam, NY	Erica Howe	W 2–1 ^{OT}	8–13–3 (5–6–1)
January 22	Brown		Cheel Arena • Potsdam, NY	Erica Howe	W 5–3	9–13–3 (6–6–1)
January 28	at #10 Quinnipiac		TD Bank Sports Center • Hamden, CT	Erica Howe	W 3–2 ^{OT}	10–13–3 (7–6–1)
January 29	at Princeton		Hobey Baker Memorial Rink • Princeton, NJ	Erica Howe	W 3–2	11–13–3 (8–6–1)
February 4	#2 Cornell		Cheel Arena • Potsdam, NY	Erica Howe	T 3–3 ^{OT}	11–13–4 (8–6–2)
February 5	Colgate		Cheel Arena • Potsdam, NY	Erica Howe	T 2–2 ^{OT}	11–13–5 (8–6–3)
February 11	#10 Harvard		Cheel Arena • Potsdam, NY	Erica Howe	T 3–3 ^{OT}	11–13–6 (8–6–4)
February 12	Dartmouth		Cheel Arena • Potsdam, NY	Lauren Dahm	L 1–3	11–14–6 (8–7–4)
February 15	at St. Lawrence		Appleton Arena • Canton, NY	Erica Howe	L 1–2 ^{OT}	11–15–6 (8–8–4)
February 18	at RPI		Houston Field House • Troy, NY	Erica Howe	W 2–1	12–15–6 (9–8–4)
February 19	at Union		Achilles Rink • Schenectady, NY	Erica Howe	W 4–0	13–15–6 (10–8–4)
ECAC Hockey Tournament
February 25	at #9 Dartmouth*		Thompson Arena • Hanover, NH (Quarterfinals Game 1)	Erica Howe	W 4–1	14–15–6
February 26	at #9 Dartmouth*		Thompson Arena • Hanover, NH (Quarterfinals Game 2)	Erica Howe	L 2–4	14–16–6
February 27	at #9 Dartmouth*		Thompson Arena • Hanover, NH (Quarterfinals Game 3)	Erica Howe	L 3–4 ^{OT}	14–17–6
*Non-conference game. ^{#}Rankings from USCHO.com Poll.

== Awards and honors ==
- Lauren Dahm – ECAC Hockey Goaltender of the Week (10/26), ECAC Hockey weekly Honor Roll (10/5, 10/19, 11/2, 11/30)
- Erica Howe – ECAC Hockey All-Rookie Team, ECAC Hockey Goaltender of the Week (2/1), ECAC Hockey weekly Honor Roll (11/2, 11/30, 1/17, 1/24)
- Carly Mercer – ECAC Hockey All-Rookie Team, ECAC Hockey weekly Honor Roll (1/17, 2/1)
- Danielle Skirrow – ECAC Hockey Player of the Week (2/1), ECAC Hockey weekly Honor Roll (10/19, 11/2)
- Brittany Styner – ECAC Hockey weekly Honor Roll (2/7)
- Melissa Waldie – ECAC Hockey weekly Honor Roll (11/9, 1/24)
