= 2010–11 RPI Engineers women's ice hockey season =

2010–11 Rensselaer Engineers women's ice hockey season
- Conference: 8 ECAC
- Home ice: Houston Field House

Rankings
- USA Today/USA Hockey Magazine: Not ranked
- USCHO.com/CBS College Sports: Not ranked

Record
- Overall: 10–18–7
- Home: 5–5–6
- Road: 5–13–1

Coaches and captains
- Head coach: John Burke
- Captain: Kendra Dunlop
- Alternate captain(s): Alisa Harrison, Sydney O'Keefe

The Rensselaer Engineers represent Rensselaer Polytechnic Institute in ECAC women's ice hockey. The Engineers participated in the ECAC playoffs did not qualify for the NCAA tournament.

== Offseason ==
=== Recruiting ===
Name	Position	Height	Nationality	Former team
Nona Letuligasenoa	Defense	5–6	United States	North American Hockey Academy
Missy Mankey	Forward	5–4	United States	Minnesota Jr. Whitecaps
Madison Marzario	Defense	5–9	United States	Shattuck St. Mary's
Toni Sanders	Forward	5–6	United States	Susquehanna Rapids U-19
Jordan Smelker	Forward	5–8	United States	Team Alaska U-19

=== Exhibition ===
Date	Opponent	Location	Score	Goal scorers
Sept. 25	Univ. of Montreal	Houston Field House	8–3	Jill Vandegrift (3), Andie Le Donne, Katie Daniels, Jordan Smelker, Taylor Horton, Toni Sanders

== Regular season ==
=== Standings ===
2010–11 Eastern College Athletic Conference standings
	Conference							Overall					
	GP	W	L	T	PTS	GF	GA	GP	W	L	T	GF	GA
#2 Cornell†*	22	20	1	1	41			35	31	3	1		
Harvard	22	14	5	3	31			32	17	11	4		
Dartmouth	22	15	7	0	30			8	5	3	0		
Princeton	22	13	8	1	27			31	16	14	1		
Quinnipiac	22	12	9	1	25			37	22	12	3		
Clarkson	22	10	8	4	24			37	14	17	6		
St. Lawrence	22	11	11	0	22			7	4	3	0		
Rensselaer	22	8	12	2	18			9	4	3	1		
Colgate	22	8	12	2	18			33	11	19	3		
Yale	22	8	12	2	18			29	9	17	3		
Brown	22	1	17	4	6			29	2	23	4		
Union	22	1	19	2	4			34	2	29	3		
Championship: Cornell † indicates conference regular season champion * indicates conference tournament champion Current rankings: USCHO.com Division I women's poll

=== Schedule ===
Date	Opponent	Location	Score	Record	Conf. Record	Goal scorers
Oct. 1	Wisconsin	Madison, WI	0–7	0–1–0	0-0-0	None
Oct. 2	Wisconsin	Madison, WI	0–6	0–2–0	0-0-0	None
Oct. 8	Vermont	Houston Field House	3–3	0–2–1	0-0-0	
Oct. 9	Vermont	Houston Field House	1–1	0–2–2	0-0-0	
Oct. 15	New Hampshire	Houston Field House	3–4	0–3–2	0-0-0	
Oct. 22	Providence	Providence, RI	3–2 (OT)	1–3–2	0-0-0	
Oct. 24	Northeastern	Boston, MA	1–5	1–4–2	0-0-0	
Oct. 29	St. Lawrence	Canton, NY	3–2	2–4–2	1–0–0	
Oct. 30	Clarkson	Potsdam, NY	1–2	2–5–2	1–1–0	
Nov. 5	Princeton	Houston Field House	1–2	2–6–2	1–2–0	
Nov. 6	Quinnipiac	Houston Field House	2–0	3–6–2	2–2–0	
Nov. 12	Yale	New Haven, CT	4–1	4–6–2	3–2–0	
Nov. 13	Brown	Providence, RI	0–1	4–7–2	3–3–0	None
Nov. 19	Niagara	Houston Field House	1–1	4–7–3	3–3–0	
Nov. 20	Niagara	Houston Field House	1–1	4–7–4	3–3–0	
Nov. 26	Syracuse	Syracuse, NY	2–1	5–7–4	3–3–0	
Nov. 27	Syracuse	Syracuse, NY	2–2	5–7–5	3–3–0	
Dec. 3	Union	Schenectady, NY	4–1	6–7–5	4–3–0	
Dec. 4	Union	Schenectady, NY	3–3	6–7–6	4–3–1	
Jan. 7	Dartmouth	Houston Field House	5–2	7–7–6	5–3–1	

== Postseason ==
- February 26: The Cornell Big Red eliminated no. 8 seed RPI by a 6–1 tally in game two of ECAC Hockey Quarterfinals.

== Awards and honors ==
- Alisa Harrison, Finalist, 2010–11 ECAC Women's Best Defensive Forward Award

=== Team awards ===
- Sonja van der Bliek, Team MVP
- Ashley Gaylord, Bill Cahill Memorial Award
- Laura Guillemette and Kristen Jakubowski, Robert Conway Scholar-Athlete Award
- Andie Le Donne, Most Improved Player
- Jordan Smelker, Rookie of the Year
- Sydney O'Keefe, Willie Stanton Award

== See also ==
- 2009–10 Rensselaer Engineers women's ice hockey season
