= 2010–11 Union Dutchwomen ice hockey season =

2010–11 Union Dutchwomen women's ice hockey season
- Conference: ECAC
- Home ice: Frank L. Messa Rink at Achilles Center

Rankings
- USA Today/USA Hockey Magazine: Not ranked
- USCHO.com/CBS College Sports: Not ranked

Record

Coaches and captains
- Head coach: Claudia Asano
- Assistant coaches: Ali Boe; Julie Chu

The 2010–11 Union Dutchwomen women's hockey team represented Union College in the 2010-11 NCAA Division I women's ice hockey season. The Dutchwomen were a member of the Eastern College Athletic Conference.

== Offseason ==
- June 7: Olympic silver medallist Julie Chu has been named as an assistant coach. Previously, Chu was assistant coach for the University of Minnesota Duluth women’s hockey team that won the 2008 NCAA National Championship.

=== Recruiting ===
| Player | Nationality | Position | Notes |
| Maddy Norton | United States | Defense | Earned Honorable Mention for the Eugenia Baker Jessup Award |
| Ashley Johnston | Canada | Forward | Youngest Ontario player to play in the CWHL (played with the Burlington Barracudas |
| Elsa Bruestle | United States | Forward | Named Minnesota Academic All-State in 2009-2010 |
| Stefanie Thomson | Canada | Forward | Played ice hockey, basketball and soccer in high school |

=== Exhibition ===
| Date | Opponent | Location | Score |
| Sept. 25 | Etobicoke (PWHL) | Messa Rink | 3-0 |

== Regular season ==
- On January 14, Kate Gallagher made 41 saves despite losing to Colgate by a 1-0 score. It was the fourth time this season she had made over 40 saves. The one goal allowed against Colgate was the fewest goals allowed in one game dating back to 1998. The following day, she made 32 saves against the Cornell Big Red.

=== Standings ===
2010–11 Eastern College Athletic Conference standings
| | Conference | | | | | | | Overall | | | | | |
| | GP | W | L | T | PTS | GF | GA | GP | W | L | T | GF | GA |
|---|---|---|---|---|---|---|---|---|---|---|---|---|---|
| #2 Cornell†* | 22 | 20 | 1 | 1 | 41 | | | 35 | 31 | 3 | 1 | | |
| Harvard | 22 | 14 | 5 | 3 | 31 | | | 32 | 17 | 11 | 4 | | |
| Dartmouth | 22 | 15 | 7 | 0 | 30 | | | 8 | 5 | 3 | 0 | | |
| Princeton | 22 | 13 | 8 | 1 | 27 | | | 31 | 16 | 14 | 1 | | |
| Quinnipiac | 22 | 12 | 9 | 1 | 25 | | | 37 | 22 | 12 | 3 | | |
| Clarkson | 22 | 10 | 8 | 4 | 24 | | | 37 | 14 | 17 | 6 | | |
| St. Lawrence | 22 | 11 | 11 | 0 | 22 | | | 7 | 4 | 3 | 0 | | |
| Rensselaer | 22 | 8 | 12 | 2 | 18 | | | 9 | 4 | 3 | 1 | | |
| Colgate | 22 | 8 | 12 | 2 | 18 | | | 33 | 11 | 19 | 3 | | |
| Yale | 22 | 8 | 12 | 2 | 18 | | | 29 | 9 | 17 | 3 | | |
| Brown | 22 | 1 | 17 | 4 | 6 | | | 29 | 2 | 23 | 4 | | |
| Union | 22 | 1 | 19 | 2 | 4 | | | 34 | 2 | 29 | 3 | | |
Championship: Cornell † indicates conference regular season champion * indicates conference tournament champion Current rankings: USCHO.com Division I women's poll

=== Schedule ===
| Date | Opponent | Location | Score | Goal scorers | Record | Conf record |
| Oct. 2 | Northeastern | Messa Rink | 2-3 | | 0-1-0 | 0-0-0 |
| Oct. 9 | Boston University | Messa Rink | 2-6 | | 0-2-0 | 0-0-0 |
| Oct. 15 | Sacred Heart | Messa Rink | 3-0 | | 1-2-0 | 0-0-0 |
| Oct. 16 | New Hampshire | Messa Rink | 1-4 | | 1-3-0 | 0-0-0 |
| Oct. 22 | Syracuse | Messa Rink | 1-3 | | 1-4-0 | 0-0-0 |
| Oct. 23 | Syracuse | Messa Rink | 0-5 | None | 1-5-0 | 0-0-0 |
| Oct. 29 | Clarkson | Potsdam, NY | | | | |
| Oct. 30 | St. Lawrence | Canton, NY | | | | |
| Nov. 5 | Quinnipiac | Messa Rink | | | | |

==== Conference record ====
| CHA school | Record |
| Brown | 0-0-0 |
| Clarkson | 0-0-0 |
| Colgate | 0-0-0 |
| Cornell | 0-0-0 |
| Dartmouth | 0-0-0 |
| Harvard | 0-0-0 |
| Quinnipiac | 0-0-0 |
| Princeton | 0-0-0 |
| RPI | 0-0-0 |
| St. Lawrence | 0-0-0 |
| Yale | |

== Awards and honors ==
- Kate Gallagher, Union, MLX Skates Player of the Week (Week of January 18, 2011)

== See also ==
- 2009–10 Union Dutchwomen women's ice hockey season
