= 2010–11 Yale Bulldogs women's ice hockey season =

- Conference: ECAC
- Home ice: Ingalls Rink

Rankings
- USA Today/USA Hockey Magazine: Not ranked
- USCHO.com/CBS College Sports: Not ranked

Record

Coaches and captains
- Head coach: Joakim Flygh
- Assistant coaches: Jessica Koizumi

The Yale Bulldogs women's ice hockey team represented Yale University in the 2010–11 NCAA Division I women's ice hockey season.

== Offseason ==
- June 7: Head coach Hilary Witt will leave the program at the end of June. Witt coached the Bulldogs for eight seasons and is the program's most victorious coach, accumulating 96 wins during her tenure.
- June 7: Mandi Schwartz was recently diagnosed for a second time with acute myeloid leukemia. Because of the relapse, Schwartz will require a cord-blood or blood-marrow donor to survive. She has been enrolled in an experimental drug testing program near her home. She died in April 2011.
- July 28: The Bulldogs have hired Joakim Flygh to be the new head coach of the Bulldogs. Flygh coached over the last nine years at Harvard (as an assistant to Katey Stone, Minnesota-Duluth (as an assistant to Shannon Miller and at a New England College men's team. This will be Flygh's first head coaching position.
- September 27: Former Minnesota Duluth player Jessica Koizumi has joined the Bulldogs as an assistant coach. She was part of the 2008 United States national women's team that won the 2008 Women's World Ice Hockey Championships.

=== Recruiting ===
Player	Nationality	Position	Notes
Jenna Ciotti	Canada	Forward	Won silver medal at the U-18 National Championships with Team Ontario Blue in 2009

=== Exhibition ===
Date	Opponent	Score
Oct. 17	McGill	0-1

== News and notes ==
- In February 2011, the passing of Daron Richardson inspired the Yale Bulldogs to raise awareness of youth mental health issues. Freshman forward Jenna Ciotti played with Daron's sister, Morgan on the Ottawa Senators of the PWHL. In addition, Ciotti was also coached by Daron's father, Luke Richardson. The Bulldogs’ support for the Do It For Daron charity was symbolized by the purple wristbands the club wore during the month of February and March in the 2010–11 Yale Bulldogs women's ice hockey season. She played on the PWHL Senators with Morgan Richardson (under Luke Richardson's coaching) for two seasons. Ciotti wanted the bracelets to keep Daron's spirit alive and support the Richardson family.
- April 3: Mandi Schwartz succumbs to recurrent acute myeloid leukemia at age 23.
- April 22: The Yale Bulldogs introduced the Mandi Schwartz Award. The award is given in acknowledgement of a Yale Bulldog player's courage, grit and determination. Aleca Hughes was named as the first winner of the award.
- April 22: Aleca Hughes was elected team captain for the 2011–12 Yale Bulldogs women's ice hockey season.

== Regular season ==
=== Standings ===
2010–11 Eastern College Athletic Conference standings
	Conference							Overall					
	GP	W	L	T	PTS	GF	GA	GP	W	L	T	GF	GA
#2 Cornell†*	22	20	1	1	41			35	31	3	1		
Harvard	22	14	5	3	31			32	17	11	4		
Dartmouth	22	15	7	0	30			8	5	3	0		
Princeton	22	13	8	1	27			31	16	14	1		
Quinnipiac	22	12	9	1	25			37	22	12	3		
Clarkson	22	10	8	4	24			37	14	17	6		
St. Lawrence	22	11	11	0	22			7	4	3	0		
Rensselaer	22	8	12	2	18			9	4	3	1		
Colgate	22	8	12	2	18			33	11	19	3		
Yale	22	8	12	2	18			29	9	17	3		
Brown	22	1	17	4	6			29	2	23	4		
Union	22	1	19	2	4			34	2	29	3		
Championship: Cornell † indicates conference regular season champion * indicates conference tournament champion Current rankings: USCHO.com Division I women's poll

=== Schedule ===
Date	Opponent	Score	Record
Oct. 22	Vermont	1-4	0-1-0
Oct. 23	Vermont	1-1	0-1-1
Oct. 29	Harvard	3-3	0-1-2

==== Conference record ====
CHA school	Record
Brown	0-0-0
Clarkson	0-0-0
Colgate	0-0-0
Cornell	0-0-0
Dartmouth	0-0-0
Harvard	0-0-0
Quinnipiac	0-0-0
Princeton	0-0-0
RPI	0-0-0
St. Lawrence	0-0-0
Union	0-0-0

== Awards and honors ==
- Jenna Ciotti, Hockey East Player of the Week (Week of February 8, 2011)
- Jenna Ciotti, Hockey East Rookie of the Week (Week of February 8, 2011)
- Aleca Hughes, 2011 Hockey Humanitarian Award finalist
- Jackee Snikeris, MLX Skates Goaltender of the Week (Week of November 30, 2010)
- Jackee Snikeris, 2011 Patty Kazmaier Award Nominee
- Jackee Snikeris, 2010-11 ECAC Goaltender of the Year
- Jackee Snikeris, 2010-11 Women's Student-Athlete of the Year
- Jackee Snikeris, New England Hockey Writers' Association Division I All-Star Team

- Jackee Snikeris, 2011 Sarah Devens Award

== See also ==
- 2009–10 Yale Bulldogs women's ice hockey season
