= Mercyhurst (disambiguation) =

Mercyhurst University, formerly Mercyhurst College, is a Catholic liberal arts college Erie, Pennsylvania.

Mercyhurst could also refer to:

- Mercyhurst University Institute for Intelligence Studies, an intelligence program at Mercyhurst University
- Mercyhurst Ice Center, an ice rink on the campus of Mercyhurst College
- Mercyhurst North East, a branch of Mercyhurst College in North East, Pennsylvania
- Mercyhurst Preparatory School, a Catholic coeducational high school in Erie, Pennsylvania
