= 2010–11 Syracuse Orange women's ice hockey season =

CHA Tournament runner-up
- Conference: CHA

Rankings
- USA Today/USA Hockey Magazine: Not ranked
- USCHO.com/CBS College Sports: Not ranked

Record
- Overall: 14–16–6

Coaches and captains
- Head coach: Paul Flanagan
- Assistant coaches: Sabrina Harbec
- Captain: Stefanie Marty
- Alternate captain(s): Taylor Metcalfe, Julie Rising and Isabel Menard

The 2010–11 Syracuse Orange season was their third season. The Orange competed in the College Hockey America conference and were unable to win the NCAA Championship. The Orange were the host club for the 2011 CHA Tournament and appeared in the CHA championship game losing to Mercyhurst by a 5–4 score.

== Offseason ==
- August 2: Former NCAA All-American player Sabrina Harbec will join the Orange coaching staff for the 2010–11 season.
- September 21: The Orange have been selected to finish second in the College Hockey America (CHA) Preseason Coach's poll.

== Recruiting ==
- July 9:Head coach Paul Flanagan announced that 10 new student-athletes will join the program for the 2010–11 season.

Player	Position	Nationality	Notes
Kallie Billadeau	Goaltender	United States	Billadeau was the top rated goalie in the state of Minnesota
Jenesica Drinkwater	Goaltender	Canada	She played for the Stoney Creek Junior Sabres. The club won the bronze medal in the Provincial Women's Hockey League (PWHL).
Sadie St. Germain	Forward	United States	St. Germain played for the Boston Shamrocks and was a three-time participant in the USA Hockey National Player Development Camp.
Cara Johnson	Forward	United States	Johnson was a member of the all-state team for two consecutive years. Johnson was named a finalist for the 2010 Minnesota Ms. Hockey Award.
Akane Hosoyamada	Defense	Canada	She played for Team Alberta at the National Women's U-18 Championship and was a member of the Junior Women's Hockey League (JWHL) championship team.
Brittney Krebs	Defense	United States	During her senior season at NSA, Krebs played in 67 games (13 goals, 33 assists). She scored five game-winning goals.
Christina LaCombe	Defense	United States	She was an all-state selection for two consecutive seasons and led the state of Minnesota in goals scored by a defenseman.
Samantha Press	Forward	United States	Press scored 15 goals and added 20 assists in her senior campaign for The Hotchkiss School.
Caitlin Roach	Defense	United States	Roach was a captain for her Honeybaked Under 19 team.
Margot Scharfe	Forward	Canada	She played for the Mississauga Junior Chiefs. The club won the Provincial Women's Hockey League (PWHL) regular season championship.
Jenesica Drinkwater	Goaltender	Canada	She played in the National Aboriginal Hockey Championship for Team Ontario South. The club won the bronze medal. During the 2008–09 season, she was one of six goalies in Canada to be selected for Team Canada Camp.

== Regular season ==
- October 1: By tying Northwestern in the season opener, it marked the first time that the Orange started the season unbeaten. Stefanie Marty had two goals in the game. Northeastern featured her twin sister Julia Marty. It was the first time the sisters had ever played against each other in their NCAA careers.
- October 8: With a 4–2 defeat of New Hampshire, the Orange is off to its best start in program history (1–0–1). In the win, senior transfer Ashley Cockell scored her first career goal for the Orange. Freshman goaltender Kallie Billadeau made 26 saves as she played in her first game for the Orange.
- October 16: The Orange continue their best start in program history with a 2–2–1 record. The Orange registered a 7–1 win against Connecticut. Syracuse's seven goals against Connecticut ties for second all-time in Orange history. Twelve different players registered points. Isabel Menard recorded the first hat trick in school history and added an assist. In addition, freshman Sadie St. Germain scored her first career goal and had two assists in the win. The Orange outshot the Huskies 38–19. In faceoffs, they had a 38–17 advantage over them.
- Oct 22–23: Isabel Menard had five assists in two games as the Orange swept Union by scores of 3–1 and 5–0, respectively. In the 5–0 triumph, Jenesica Drinkwater registered the first shutout of her career. She turned away 13 shots and extended her record to 2–0–1 on the season.
- Nov. 5: Isabel Menard scored both of Syracuse's goals as the Orange lost 3–2 versus Clarkson. Menard's second goal was scored with 1:23 remaining in regulation. She took the puck the length of the ice, beating every Clarkson defender to net her seventh goal of the season.
- November 23 – December 4: Orange freshman Akane Hosoyamada has at least one point in five of the Orange's last six games dating back to Nov. 23. She had two assists in each game against Wayne State. Her second assist in the second game versus Wayne State.
- On November 30, Kallie Billadeau set a Syracuse record with 57 saves in a 4–1 loss against No. 1 Cornell.
- November 30 – December 4: Isabel Menard registered two goals and two assists in a span of three games. She had a goal and an assist in both wins against Wayne State to help the Orange start conference play with two wins. As of December 6, Menard's 16 assists rank 14th nationally and tie for second in the CHA. She now has nine multiple-point scoring games this season, a Syracuse program record.
- Dec 3–4: Kallie Billadeau, was instrumental in helping the Syracuse start conference play at a mark of 2–0. In both games, she had 76 saves. In game two against Wayne State, she turned away 19 shots to help SU start CHA play 2–0.
- On January 22, Sadie St. Germain scored the only goal in a 3–1 loss to Niagara on Saturday. She now has two goals and four assists, which is tied for 11th in the CHA in freshman scoring.
- February 21: Isabel Menard was one of twenty-five nominees for the Patty Kazmaier Memorial Award. She has been Syracuse's leading scorer since her career began in 2009. In 2010–11, she registered 15 goals and 22 assists, ranking 24th in the nation in points per game. Her 15 goals rank 25thand is tied for 22nd in assists (21). She has recorded a program record 11 multiple-point scoring games this season.

=== Standings ===
2010–11 College Hockey America standings
	Overall							Conference					
	GP	W	L	T	PTS	GF	GA	GP	W	L	T	GF	GA
#5 Mercyhurst†*	27	22	5	0	44	144	54	11	11	0	0	61	15
Niagara	28	9	14	5	23	41	68	12	6	4	2	23	26
Syracuse	28	11	13	4	26	71	79	10	5	4	1	23	23
Robert Morris	29	5	19	5	15	59	117	13	2	8	3	26	49
Wayne State	26	8	16	2	18	51	70	12	1	9	2	19	39
Championship: † indicates conference regular season champion * indicates conference tournament champion Current rankings: USCHO.com Division I women's poll

- Rankings based on number of wins in the conference

=== Schedule ===
Date	Opponent	Time	Location	Score	Goal scorers	Record	Conf. Record
Fri, Oct 1	Northeastern University	7 p.m.	Tennity Ice Pavilion	4–4	Stefanie Marty (2), Isabel Menard, Megan Skelly	0–0–1	0-0-0
Fri, Oct 8	University of New Hampshire	7 p.m.	Tennity Ice Pavilion	4–2	Stefanie Marty, Megan Skelly, Ashley Cockell, Lisa Mullan	1–0–1	0-0-0
Sat, Oct 9	Boston College	4 p.m.	Tennity Ice Pavilion	2–5	Isabel Menard, Julie Rising	1–1–1	0-0-0
Fri, Oct 15	Providence College	7 p.m.	Tennity Ice Pavilion				
Sat, Oct 16	University of Connecticut	4 p.m.	Tennity Ice Pavilion				
Fri, Oct 22	Union College	TBA	Schenectady, NY				
Sat, Oct 23	Union College	TBA	Schenectady, NY				
Fri, Oct 29	Ohio State University	TBA	Columbus, OH				
Sat, Oct 30	Ohio State University	TBA	Columbus, OH				
Fri, Nov 5	Clarkson University	7 p.m.	Tennity Ice Pavilion				
Fri, Nov 12	Clarkson University	3 p.m.	Potsdam, NY				
Tue, Nov 23	Colgate University	TBA	Hamilton, NY				
Fri, Nov 26	Rensselaer Polytechnic Institute	7 p.m.	Tennity Ice Pavilion				
Sat, Nov 27	Rensselaer Polytechnic Institute	2 p.m.	Tennity Ice Pavilion				
Tue, Nov 30	Cornell University	7 p.m.	Tennity Ice Pavilion				
Fri, Dec 3	* Wayne State University	7 p.m.	Tennity Ice Pavilion				
Sat, Dec 4	* Wayne State University	2 p.m.	Tennity Ice Pavilion				
Fri, Dec 10	Princeton University	7 p.m.	Princeton, NJ				
Sat, Dec 11	Princeton University	4 p.m.	Princeton, NJ				
Tue, Jan 4	Colgate University	7 p.m.	Tennity Ice Pavilion				
Fri, Jan 7	* Mercyhurst College	TBA	Erie, PA				
Sat, Jan 8	* Mercyhurst College	TBA	Erie, PA				
Fri, Jan 14	* Robert Morris University	7 p.m.	Tennity Ice Pavilion				
Sat, Jan 15	* Robert Morris University	2 p.m.	Tennity Ice Pavilion				
Fri, Jan 21	* Niagara University	TBA	Niagara Falls, NY				
Sat, Jan 22	* Niagara University	TBA	Niagara Falls, NY				
Fri, Jan 28	* Wayne State University	TBA	Detroit, MI				
Sat, Jan 29	* Wayne State University	TBA	Detroit, MI				
Fri, Feb 11	* Mercyhurst College	7 p.m.	Tennity Ice Pavilion				
Sat, Feb 12	* Mercyhurst College	2 p.m.	Tennity Ice Pavilion				
Fri, Feb 18	* Robert Morris University	TBA	Moon Township, PA				
Sat, Feb 19	* Robert Morris University	TBA	Moon Township, PA				
Fri, Feb 25	* Niagara University	7 p.m.	Tennity Ice Pavilion				
Sat, Feb 26	* Niagara University	2 p.m.	Tennity Ice Pavilion				

==== Conference record ====
CHA school	Record
Mercyhurst	
Niagara	
Robert Morris	
Wayne State	

== Postseason ==
- March 5, 2011: In the CHA championship game, Meghan Agosta scored three goals to top 300 points for her career. The Lakers defeated Syracuse 5–4 and captured its ninth straight College Hockey America title. Despite getting outshot 13–3 in the first period, Syracuse scored two goals on its first two attempts on the power play. Stefanie Marty gave the Orange an early 1–0 lead and Margot Scharfe scored the second goal. In the third period, Mercyhurst had a 5–3 lead when Julie Rising scored the team's fourth power play goal of the game.
- Freshman goaltender Kallie Billadeau combined for 59 saves in two games during the CHA Tournament. She earned her first career shutout (1–0) against the Niagara Purple Eagles in the semifinals. In the championship versus Mercyhurst, she turned away 41 shots. Billadeau was named to the all-tournament team for her performances.

== Awards and honors ==
- Kallie Bilodeau, CHA Goaltender of the Week (Week of February 28)
- Kallie Bilodeau, CHA All-Tournament team
- Ashley Cockell, CHA Player of the Week (Week of February 21)
- Isabel Menard, CHA Player of the Week (Week of October 18)
- Isabel Menard, CHA Player of the Week (Week of February 28)
- Sadie St. Germain, CHA Rookie of the Week (Week of October 18)
- Margot Scharfe, CHA Rookie of the Week (Week of February 28)

=== Postseason ===
- Kallie Billadeau, 2011 CHA All-Rookie team
- Akane Hosoyamada, 2011 CHA All-Rookie team
- Isabel Menard, 2011 Patty Kazmaier Award Nominee
- Isabel Menard, 2011 All-CHA First Team

== See also ==
- 2008–09 Syracuse Orange women's ice hockey season
- 2009–10 Syracuse Orange women's ice hockey season
