= 2010–11 Mercyhurst Lakers women's ice hockey season =

CHA regular season champions CHA tournament champions NCAA Regionals, Lost, 4-2 vs. Boston University
- Conference: CHA
- Home ice: Mercyhurst Ice Center

Rankings
- USA Today/USA Hockey Magazine: 3
- USCHO.com/CBS College Sports: 7

Record
- Overall: 29-6-0

Coaches and captains
- Head coach: Michael Sisti
- Captain: Meghan Agosta
- Alternate captain(s): Vicki Bendus, Jesse Scanzano

The Mercyhurst Lakers represented Mercyhurst College in the 2010–11 NCAA Division I women's ice hockey season. The Frozen Four was hosted by Mercyhurst College at Louis J. Tullio Arena in Erie, Pennsylvania.

== Offseason ==
- Jesse Scanzano participated in the evaluation camp for the senior 2010–11 Canadian national women's team. Scanzano played for Canada White (the camp was divided into four teams, Red, White, Yellow, Blue). Bailey Bram, Christine Bestland and Meghan Agosta played for Canada Yellow. Vicki Bendus played for Canada Blue.
- August 27: Meghan Agosta was announced as a finalist for the Women's Sports Foundation's 2010 Sportswoman of the Year Team Award. It is awarded to the top female athlete (NCAA, Olympic, professional) who has demonstrated exceptional play in helping her team win a championship.
- September 9: Head coach Michael Sisti appointed Meghan Agosta as team captain. Vicki Bendus and Jesse Scanzano are alternate captains.
- On September 12, 2010, Lakers assistant coach Kristen Cameron sustained a serious spinal cord injury which was given immediate medical care at Hamot Medical Center in Erie, Pennsylvania. She was hit by a car and thrown 15 metres off her bicycle. During the season, the Lakers wore a patch on their jerseys with the initials K.C 10-11.
- September 28: In the USA Today/USA Hockey Magazine Women's College Hockey Poll, the Lakers have been voted as the pre-season Number 3.

=== Recruiting ===
Player	Position	Nationality	Notes
Lauren Barnes	Forward	United States	She helped Burnsville High School to a 22-8-1 record in 2009-10.
Christine Bestland	Forward	Canada	Bestland played for Canada's Pursuit of Excellence. She also played for the Canadian National Women’s Under-18 Team during 2009-10.
Christie Cicero	Forward	United States	She led the New Jersey Rockets to a 31-15-3 record during the 2009-10 season and was its captain.
Ashley Harper	Goaltender	United States	She was a team manager for the past few seasons.

== Exhibition ==
Date	Opponent	Location	Score	Goal scorers
Sept 25	Mercyhurst vs. Wilfrid Laurier	Erie, PA	7-0, Mercyhurst	Cassea Schols, Pamela Zgoda, Kelley Steadman, Lauren Jones, Christie Cicero, Samantha Watt, Kylie Rossler

== News and notes ==
=== October ===
- October 1: Meghan Agosta joined Jesse Scanzano as only the second Mercyhurst player to have 100 career assists. She picked up the assist in the second period.
- October 15: Bailey Bram registered two assists, including her 100th career point, in a game against the Bemidji State Beavers. She became the 11th Lakers player to crack the century mark in the 4-0 win. Junior Hillary Pattenden recorded her first shutout of the season and seventh career in the 4-0 win.
- October 16: With the loss against Bemidji State, the Lakers endured their first regular-season road loss in 38 games dating back to the end of the 2007-08 season.
- As the Lakers went 6-1-0 in October 2010, Bestland scored four goals, including two in a 7-3 defeat of the Robert Morris Colonials. In addition, she had six as¬sists. In her first game as a Laker, she scored a goal. She registered points in five of the seven games played and finished the month with a plus/minus rating of +13. For her efforts, she was recognized as College Hockey America's Rookie of the Month.
- October 29 marked the CHA opening game for both the Mercyhurst Lakers and Robert Morris Colonials. Meghan Agosta scored two goals and notched an assist in a 7-3 defeat of the Colonials. Agosta's goals came during a six-goal first period for the Lakers, and her two goals were separated by just 20 seconds. The goals happened at the 19:27 and 19:47 marks. With the two scores, Agosta now has 20 career goals against the Colonials. For the month of October, Agosta scored 10 goals and had 19 points.

=== November ===
- Nov. 2 and 6: Bailey Bram led the Lakers in scoring with four goals. Bram posted her third career hat trick in a game versus second-ranked Cornell. With the hat trick, Bram surpassed the 50-goal career plateau at Mercyhurst. A few days later, Bram scored another goal versus Niagara. For her efforts, she was recognized as the CHA Player of the Week.

=== December ===
- On December 3–4, 2010, Christine Bestland scored three goals and had two assists as the Lakers swept the Purple Eagles for the first time since the 2008-09 season. She stretched her scoring streak to a career-long three games in Saturday's 7-2 victory. Vicki Bendus led all skaters with six points in the Lakers' two-game sweep of Niagara. She scored a goal in each game and accumulated four assists. Stephanie Ciampa of Mercyhurst earned her second career win on December 3. Mercyhurst had a 6-1 win over the Purple Eagles. She recorded eight saves and allowed one goal in the final minutes after holding Niagara scoreless for nearly 57minutes. She is now 2-0-0 in her career at the college.
- December 10–11: In a two-game series versus St. Lawrence, Agosta scored three goals and added four assists. In the December 11 win, she scored two goals and assisted on three others to help the Lakers defeat the Skating Saints by a 7-3 score. The five-point performance marked a season-high for points in a game in the season. In addition, she moved her season total to 38, which ranks first in the NCAA.

=== January ===
- On January 14 and 15, Bailey Bram combined for nine points in the two wins over Brown. In the first win, Bram accumulated three assists for a 6-0 score. The following day, she registered two goals and four assists for a career-high six points. In addition, Mercyhurst notched 12 goals in a game for the first time since the 1999-2000 season. Rookie Christie Cicero scored two goals and two assists in the series. In each game she registered a goal and an assist. For the season, she has registered seven goals and five assists.
- Jan 18: Senior Karlee Overguard scored twice, while freshman Lauren Slebodnick made 24 saves to secure a 3-0 victory at Mercyhurst. The win for Cornell avenged the only loss for the Big Red on the season, a 4-3 loss to the Lakers back in November at Lynah Rink. The other goal for the Big Red was scored by Catherine White. The Big Red went scoreless in four power-play opportunities, but successfully killed three penalties. For Mercyhurst, Hillary Pattenden stopped 29 of the 32 shots she faced on the night in taking the loss.
- January 21–22: Christine Bestland tied teammates Meghan Agosta and Jesse Scanzano with five points in the two-game sweep of the Robert Morris Colonials. She scored two goals and added three assists to increase her point total to 35 on the season. On the 21st, she scored two goals and helped out on another. Meghan Agosta scored a goal and dished out two assists. The following day, Bestland assisted on two goals as the Lakers scored seven goals against Robert Morris for the second time this season. Agosta she scored her 26th of the season while the Lakers were short-handed, and added an assist. By defeating the Robert Morris Colonials on January 22, the Lakers have now won 20 games for the 10th straight season. The season series against the Colonials is now 26-0-0 all-time. Agosta is now just seven points away from breaking former Harvard player Julie Chu's mark of 285 points to become the NCAA all-time points leader. Hillary Pattenden picked up both wins in the series with 18 saves in the first game and 25 in the second. She improves to 18-5-0 on the season.
- January 30: In the third period, Jess Jones scored the game-winning goal versus Niagara. The goal broke a scoreless tie and it was her 100th career point. She had scored the game's first goal at the 1:46 mark of the third period. She was the second Lakers player in the season to accomplish the feat (Bailey Bram being the other) and the 12th player in Lakers history to record at least 100 points in a career.

=== February ===
- On February 4, 2011, Meghan Agosta became the all-time leading scorer in NCAA women's hockey history with three goals and one assist in Mercyhurst College's 6-2 win over Wayne State in Erie, Pennsylvania. Agosta's four points gave her 286 career points, one more than ex-Harvard forward Julie Chiu's record of 285 set in 2006-07. Agosta, who also owns the record for most short-handed goals and game-winning goals, added three assists in the Lakers' 3-1 win over Wayne State on February 5.
- February 5: Senior assistant captain Jesse Scanzano scored a natural hat trick, senior captain Meghan Agosta dished out three assists, and junior Hillary Pattenden made 19 saves to earn her 22nd win of the season (22-5-0) and surpass Laura Hosier for most wins in program history with 75 career victories (75-11-3).
- Meghan Agosta was featured in Sports Illustrated's Faces in the Crowd feature in the February 21, 2011 issue (as recognition of becoming the all-time NCAA scorer).
- February 11–12: Meghan Agosta scored her 150th career goal and accumulated five points as the Lakers swept CHA opponent Syracuse by 4-0 and 4-2 tallies at Tennity Ice Pavilion. On February 11, she had two assists, (including one for the game-winning goal) in the 4-0 win. On February 12, she tied Nicole Corriero for most goals in NCAA women's hockey history as part of a three-point performance. In both wins over Syracuse, Hillary Pattenden moved her winning streak to eight. On February 11, she registered 20 saves to record her sixth shutout of the year. After the 4-2 triumph on February 12, Pattenden now has allowed two goals or less in seven straight games.
- February 16: Senior captain Meghan Agosta of the fifth-ranked Mercyhurst College women's hockey team was honored as the area's top collegiate athlete at the 47th Annual Erie Charity Sports Banquet,
- February 21: Senior captain Meghan Agosta, senior assistant captains Vicki Bendus and Jesse Scanzano and juniors Bailey Bram and Hillary Pattenden have been nominated for the Patty Kazmaier Memorial Award.

Mercyhurst leads all schools with five nominatees.

- February 25, 2011: Meghan Agosta scored her 151st career goal to become all-time leading goal scorer in NCAA history. She accomplished this in a 6-2 victory over the Robert Morris Colonials women's ice hockey program at the Mercyhurst Ice Center. She surpassed Harvard's Nicole Corriero, who set the record at 150 during the 2004-05 season. The goal was scored on the power play at 15:18 of the second period with the assist going to Bailey Bram. She later added her 152nd goal in the third period.

=== March ===
- March 3, 2011: Nine Mercyhurst Lakers were honored at the 2011 College Hockey America Postseason Banquet in Syracuse, N.Y. Agosta was named CHA Player of the Year as well as a First Team All-CHA selection, marking the fourth time in her career she captured both accolades. She was also recognized as the CHA scoring champion. Michael Sisti was recognized as coach of the year, senior Cassea Schols was honoured as top defender and junior Hillary Pattenden earned the regular season goaltending trophy. All-CHA first team selections included Agosta, Vicki Bendus, Schols and junior Pamela Zgoda. Jesse Scanzano, Bailey Bram and Pattenden were given spots on the second team. Freshman Christine Bestland was named to the all-rookie team. Agosta was named CHA Player of the Year as well as a First Team All-CHA selection, marking the fourth time in her career she captured both accolades.
- March 5, 2011: In the CHA championship game, Meghan Agosta scored three goals to top 300 points for her career. The Lakers defeated Syracuse 5-4 and captured its ninth straight College Hockey America title.

== Regular season ==
The Lakers recorded their second undefeated conference season in the past three years. Against CHA competition, the squad went 16-0-0, averaging 5.25 goals per game while allowing just over a goal per game (1.38). In conference play, Meghan Agosta led the CHA in every offensive category. She scored 18 goals and added 23 assists for 41 points. Of her 41 points, 17 came on the power play, while four others came on the penalty kill, including three short-handed goals.

=== Standings ===
2010–11 College Hockey America standings
	Overall							Conference					
	GP	W	L	T	PTS	GF	GA	GP	W	L	T	GF	GA
#5 Mercyhurst†*	27	22	5	0	44	144	54	11	11	0	0	61	15
Niagara	28	9	14	5	23	41	68	12	6	4	2	23	26
Syracuse	28	11	13	4	26	71	79	10	5	4	1	23	23
Robert Morris	29	5	19	5	15	59	117	13	2	8	3	26	49
Wayne State	26	8	16	2	18	51	70	12	1	9	2	19	39
Championship: † indicates conference regular season champion * indicates conference tournament champion Current rankings: USCHO.com Division I women's poll

- Rankings based on number of wins in the conference

=== Roster ===
Number	Name	Height	Position	Shoots	Class
1	Kelci Lanthier	5-5	G		So.
2	Samantha Watt	5-10	D		So.
4	Pamela Zgoda	5-6	D	R	Jr.
7	Jessica ChristofferJrn	5-8	F		So.
8	Melissa Lacroix	5-9	D	R	Sr.
9	Kelley Steadman	5-11	F	R	Jr.
10	Lauren Jones	5-7	F		So.
11	Vicki Bendus	5-1	F	R	Sr.
13	Bailey Bram	5-7	F	L	Jr.
15	Anna JohnJrn	5-11	D	L	Jr.
16	Kylie Rossler	5-6	F	R	Sr.
19	Stephanie DeSutter	5-9	D	L	So.
20	Meghan Corbett	5-6	F	R	Jr.
21	Ashley Cockell	5-8	D	R	Sr.
22	Jess Jones	5-4	F	L	Jr.
23	Jesse Scanzano	6-0	F	R	Sr.
27	Julie Hersey	5-8	F	R	Jr.
28	Cassea Schols	5-9	D	R	Sr.
30	Hillary Pattenden	5-6	G	L	Jr.
35	Stephanie Ciampa	5-6	G		So.

=== Schedule ===
Date	Opponent	Location	Score	Record	Conf. Record	Goal scorers
Oct 1	St. Cloud State	Erie, PA	9-1	1-0-0	0-0-0	Vicki Bendus (2), Meghan Agosta, Jesse Scanzano, Kelley Steadman, Cassea Schols, Jessica Christofferson, Christie Cicero, Christine Bestland
Oct. 2	St. Cloud State	Erie, PA	6-1	2-0-0	0-0-0	Jesse Scanzano, Bailey Bram, Vicki Bendus, Kelley Steadman, Meghan Agosta, Christie Cicero
Oct. 9, 2010	Maine	Bangor, Maine	5-2	3-0-0	0-0-0	
Oct. 10, 2010	Maine	Bangor, Maine	6-2	4-0-0	0-0-0	
Oct. 15, 2010	Bemidji State	Bemidji, Minn.				
Oct. 16, 2010	Bemidji State	Bemidji, Minn.				
Fri, Jan 7	Syracuse	Erie, PA				
Sat, Jan 8	Syracuse	Erie, PA				
Fri, Feb 11	Syracuse	Tennity Ice Pavilion				
Sat, Feb 12	Syracuse	Tennity Ice Pavilion				

==== Conference record ====
CHA school	Record
Niagara	
Robert Morris	
Syracuse	
Wayne State	

== Awards and honors ==
- Meghan Agosta, finalist for the Women's Sports Foundation's 2010 Sportswoman of the Year Team Award
- Meghan Agosta, CHA Offensive Player of the Week (Week of October 5)
- Meghan Agosta, CHA Offensive Player of the Week (Week of October 11)
- Meghan Agosta, CHA Offensive Player of the Week (Week of November 1)
- Meghan Agosta, College Hockey America Player of the Week (Week of December 12, 2010)
- Meghan Agosta, CHA Player of the Month, October 2010
- Meghan Agosta, CHA Player of the Week (Week of January 24, 2011)
- Meghan Agosta, CHA Player of the Month, January 2011
- Vicki Bendus, College Hockey America Player of the Week (Week of December 6)
- Christine Bestland, CHA Rookie of the Week (Week of October 11)
- Christine Bestland, CHA Rookie of the Week (Week of November 1)
- Christine Bestland, CHA Rookie of the Month, October 2010
- Christine Bestland, College Hockey America Rookie of the Week (Week of December 6)
- Christine Bestland, CHA Rookie of the Week (Week of January 24, 2011)
- Christine Bestland, CHA Rookie of the Week (Week of January 31, 2011)
- Christine Bestland, CHA Rookie of the Month, January 2011
- Bailey Bram, College Hockey America Player of the Week (Week of January 17, 2011)
- Christie Cicero, College Hockey America Rookie of the Week (Week of January 17, 2011)
- Jess Jones, CHA Player of the Week (Week of January 31, 2011)
- Hillary Pattenden, CHA Defensive Player of the Week (Week of October 5)
- Hillary Pattenden, College Hockey America Defensive Player of the Week (Week of December 12, 2010)
- Hillary Pattenden, CHA Defensive Player of the Month, January 2011
- Hillary Pattenden, CHA Goaltender of the Week (Week of January 31, 2011)
- Michael Sisti, Finalist, 2011 AHCA Women's Ice Hockey Division I Coach of the Year

=== CHA end-of-season awards ===
- Meghan Agosta, CHA Player of the Year
- Meghan Agosta, First Team All-CHA selection
- Vicki Bendus, 2010-11 First Team All-CHA selection
- Christine Bestland, 2010-11 All-CHA Rookie Team selection
- Bailey Bram, 2010-11 Second Team All-CHA selection
- Hillary Pattenden, 2010-11 CHA goaltending champion
- Hillary Pattenden, 2010-11 Second Team All-CHA selection
- Jesse Scanzano, 2010-11 Second Team All-CHA selection
- Cassea Scholls, 2010-11 First Team All-CHA selection
- Michael Sisti, CHA coach of the year
- Pamela Zgoda, 2010-11 First Team All-CHA selection

=== Postseason awards ===
- Meghan Agosta, CHA All-Tournament team
- Meghan Agosta, CHA Tournament Most Valuable Player
- Meghan Agosta, 2011 First Team All-America selection
- Ashley Harper, 2010-11 Top Scholar-Athlete in College Hockey America

== International ==
- On October 6, 2010, Meghan Agosta and Vicki Bendus were selected to play for the Canadian National Women's Team that will play in the 2010 Four Nations Cup.

== CWHL draft picks ==
The following Lakers (including alumni) were selected in the 2011 CWHL Draft.

Player	Pick	Team
Meghan Agosta	1	Montreal Stars
Vicki Bendus	4	Brampton Thunder
Jesse Scanzano	5	Toronto CWHL
Melissa Lacroix	17	Toronto CWHL

== See also ==
- 2010–11 College Hockey America women's ice hockey season
- 2010–11 ECAC women's ice hockey season
- 2010–11 Hockey East women's ice hockey season
