= John Olszowka =

American historian (born 1965)

- Born: October 14, 1965 (age 60); North Tonawanda, New York, U.S.
- Education: Binghamton University
- Scientific career
- Fields: American history
- Doctoral advisor: Thomas Dublin

John Olszowka (born October 14, 1965) is an American professor of history and academic administrator. He currently serves as Dean of the Ridge College of Intelligence Studies and Applied Sciences at Mercyhurst University in Erie, Pennsylvania.

== Background ==
Olszowka was born in North Tonawanda, New York to Christine (née Gorski) and Robert Olszowka. He attended OLC-Ascension Grade School and later North Tonawanda High School. Following high school, Olszowka enrolled in SUNY-Buffalo where he earned a bachelor's degree in history in 1988. Afterwards, Olszowka went to the State University of New York College at Buffalo. There he was introduced to labor history, by historian James McDonnell. After earning a master's degree, Olszowka attended Binghamton University where he earned his doctoral degree in history. At Binghamton, Olszowka studied with historians Thomas Dublin, Brendan McConville, and Richard Dalfiume.

== Career ==
Olszowka began his teaching career at the University of Maine at Farmington in 2001. Prior to Farmington, Olszowka also held positions at SUNY-Geneseo and Lycoming College. In addition he held a research fellowship at the Smithsonian Institution. In 2005. he joined the faculty at Mercyhurst University.

In 2015, Olszowka was named Chair of the Thomas B. Hagen Department of History at Mercyhurst. Then in 2019, the university selected him to serve as Associate Provost of Graduate Programming and Strategic Initiatives. In May 2021, Olszowka was tabbed to serve as Interim Dean of the Ridge College of Intelligence Studies and Applied Sciences. In October the university removed the interim tag, with Olszowka serving the roles of Dean of Ridge College and Associate Vice Provost for Graduate Programming.

== Scholarship ==
Olszowka's area of speciality is American social and labor history, with an emphasis on the interwar period, 1919–1945. A major focus of his research has centered on labor relations in the aircraft industry.

=== Publications ===
- America in the 1930s (Syracuse University, 2014)
- "The Niagara Frontier Defense League's Patriotic War on Labor: The Case of Curtiss Aeroplance, 1917–1918" (Labor History, 2012)
- "The UAW and the Struggle to Organize the Aircraft Industry, 1937–1942" (Labor History, 2008)
