= Mary D'Angelo Performing Arts Center =

Coordinates: 42.10653°N 80.05466°W

The Mary D'Angelo Performing Arts Center is part of Mercyhurst University.

== Quick Facts ==
- The Mary D'Angelo Performing Arts Center is located at Mercyhurst University in Erie, Pennsylvania.
- It holds 792 seats along with the box seats which hold 24, totaling 816 seats.
- The Mary D’Angelo Performing Arts Center was the first theater in the U.S. to use geothermal energy to heat and cool its facility.
- The chandeliers that hang over the opera boxes are exactly the same chandeliers that hang in the Metropolitan Opera House in NYC. They were made in Austria from pure Crystal.

== History ==
The Mary D’Angelo Performing Arts Center opened in February 1996. The first concert featured pianist André Watts. During a blizzard, Watts took the stage to perform in front of nearly 800 people on a piano that was shipped to them from Pittsburgh. In the middle of his performance, Watts stood up and the audience stared in confusion as the piano continued to play. Turns out the piano keys were frozen and an untuned piano from backstage was wheeled out for him to play. After that performance Watts swore that he would never again agree to play a grand opening because of his self-proclaimed "curse." Apparently Watts opened two other facilities that year and a fire alarm and sprinklers interrupted his performances.

When the Mary D’Angelo Performing Arts Center opened in 1996, the center had two full-time and two part-time staff members. In its infancy, the center brought in nearly 4,000 people a year and offered between six and seven programs, which consisted of the finest in Classical music featuring artists such as Kathleen Battle and the Juilliard String Quartet. Fourteen years later, the center has a staff of six full-time employees and offers over a hundred events each year featuring jazz, dance, classical, contemporary and world music. Serving as the only active movie house in the city of Erie, the center is also home to the Guelcher Film Series, The Metropolitan Opera: HD Live series and the Live from NY's 92nd Street Y broadcast lecture series. Mercyhurst's D'Angelo Arts Complex in Zurn Hall exceeds 50,000 square feet (4,600 m^{2}).

The arts complex also includes the black-box Taylor Little Theatre, the Walker Recital Hall, and the recently expanded Cummings Art Gallery. Adjacent to the Mary D'Angelo Performing Arts Center are the department of dance with two dance studios called danceSpace, and the D'Angelo department of music.

== Facilities ==
- Mary D'Angelo Performing Arts Center
  - seats 792, along with 24 box seats
- Walker Recital Hall
  - seats 250
  - Walker Recital Hall opened on October 27, 2002 with a two-hour recital featuring pianist, Lorin Hollander for guests which included Dr. Barrett and Catherine Walker and their family.
- Taylor Little Theatre
  - seats 251
  - Named in honor of Sister M. Eustace Taylor, in 1994, for her lifelong devotion to Mercyhurst College and for her love of the humanities as a true Renaissance woman
- Cummings Art Gallery
  - 150 person standing capacity
  - Named after Sister Angelica Cummings, founder of the Mercyhurst Art department and opened in January 1984

== Staff ==
The Mary D'Angelo Performing Arts Center has seven full-time employees

PAC

- Director: Michael Fuhrman
- Assistant Director: Bruce Parkhurst
- Box Office Manager: Annette Gardner
- Assistant Marketing Manager: Michelle Ellia
- Production Manager: Greg Clepper
- Production Technician: Randy Stankey

Cummings Art Gallery

- Gallery Director: Robert Hagle

== 2008-2009 season ==
- Guelcher Film Series
- Live from NY's 92nd Street Y broadcast series
- Metropolitan Opera: HD Live series
- The Jazz Mandolin Project
- Bad Boys Of Dance
- Igudesman & Joo
- Robin Mckelle
- Leahy: A Celtic Christmas
- CityMusic Cleveland
- Quartet New Generation
- Ballet Hispanico
- The Dirty Dozen Brass Band & Trombone Shorty

== Notable performances ==
The center has hosted several Grammy Award-winning artists such as Maria Schneider, Paquito D’Rivera and Eric Bibb. World-renowned dance troupes such as the Paul Taylor Dance Company and Pilobolus have graced the stage of the D’Angelo Center, along with world music artists such as Pink Martini and Jesse Cook. The most successful show and quite possibly the most well known in the center's history is the Japanese drummers, known as Yamato. Yamato has visited Erie four times over the last seven years and has performed five sold-out performances to over 5,000 people.

Other notable performances include those that comprise the center's educational outreach program. Through the program, the D’Angelo Center has had the opportunity to expose the young people in the area to the arts. Since the start of the program the center has been able to provide over 6,300 students with the opportunity to see performances such as the African Drummers, Ba Cissoko, Latin dance troupe Ballet Hispanico and Yamato.
