= Terry Smith (basketball) =

American basketball player

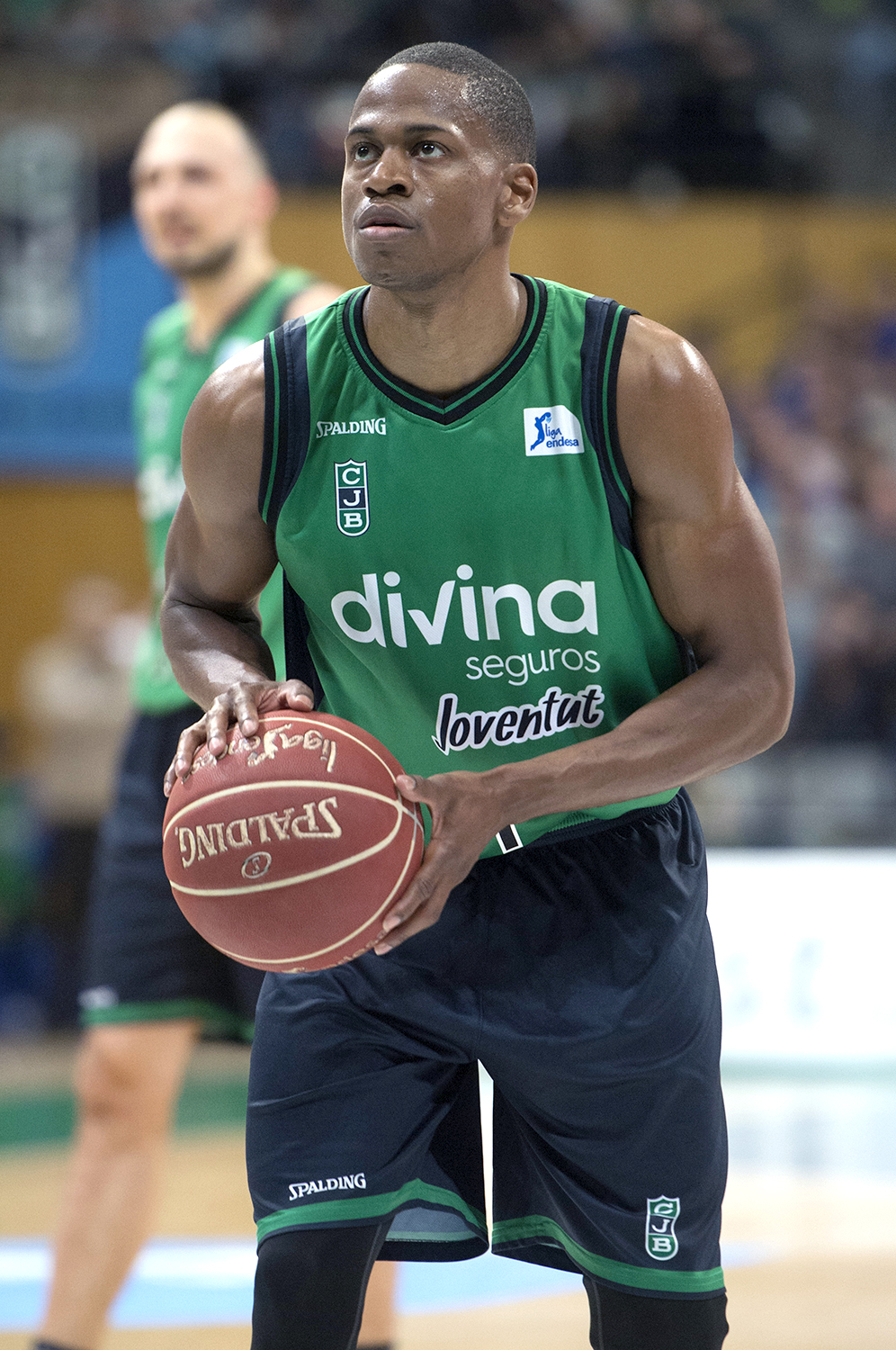

Free Agent
- Position: Point guard

Personal information
- Born: February 10, 1986 (age 39); Syracuse, New York, U.S.
- Listed height: 6 ft 1 in (1.85 m)

Career information
- High school: Bishop Ludden (Syracuse, New York)
- College: Mercyhurst (2004–2008)
- NBA draft: 2008: undrafted
- Playing career: 2008–present

Career history
- 2008: NVV Lions Mönchengladbach
- 2009–2011: BC Kolin
- 2011–2012: BBC Monthey
- 2012–2013: Rilski Sportist
- 2013–2014: Cherkaski Mavpy
- 2014: Jolly Jadranska Banka Šibenik
- 2014–2015: Lukoil Academic Sofia
- 2015–2016: Sakarya BB
- 2016: ASVEL Villeurbanne
- 2016: Urartu
- 2016–2017: Joventut Badalona
- 2017–2018: HTV Basket
- 2018–2019: Lions de Genève
- 2019: Saskatchewan Rattlers
- 2019–2023: Nantes
- 2023–2024: Fos Provence Basket
- 2024: Al-Shorta

Career highlights
- Bulgarian champion (2015)

Terry James Smith (born February 10, 1986) is an American professional basketball player who last played for Al-Shorta.

== College career ==
Smith attended NCAA Division II school Mercyhurst University from 2004 to 2008, where he scored a total of 1,384 points in 105 contests, placing him as the sixth all-time leading scorer in Mercyhurst history at the time of his graduation.

== Professional career ==
After concluding his college career, Smith launched his professional career with the NVV Lions Mönchengladbach in Germany’s second-tier league 2. Bundesliga, before embarking on a journey through European basketball with stops in several countries. He played in the Czech Republic (BC Kolin), Switzerland (BBC Monthey), Bulgaria (Samakov, Sofia), Ukraine (SK Cherkasy Monkeys) and Croatia (Sibenik), earning himself a reputation as a scoring point guard with the ability to get his teammates involved. In 2015, Smith joined Sakarya Isik Koleji of Turkey, before moving on to French powerhouse ASVEL Villeurbanne in January 2016.

He played for Armenian side BC Urartu, a member of the Russian Superleague, in the early stages of the 2016-17 campaign and was picked up by Joventut Badalona of the Spanish top-flight Liga ACB in December 2016.

Smith moved to the French LNB Pro A for the 2017–18 campaign, signing with HTV Basket. He averaged 10.4 points, 4.1 assists and 3.1 rebounds per game. He signed with Lions de Genève of the Swiss league on August 9, 2018. He signed with the Saskatchewan Rattlers of the CEBL on July 1, 2019.

On August 18, 2023, he signed with Fos Provence Basket of the Pro B. On January 12, 2024, Fos Provence Basket and Smith decided to end their collaboration by mutual agreement.

On February 15, 2024, Smith signed with Al-Shorta.
