= 2010–11 CHA women's ice hockey season =

2010–11 College Hockey America women's ice hockey season
- League: NCAA Division I
- Sport: Ice hockey
- Duration: September 2010 through March, 2011

Regular Season
- Champion: Mercyhurst Lakers
- League champions: Mercyhurst Lakers
- Runners-up: Syracuse Orange
- Season MVP: Meghan Agosta
- Top scorer: Meghan Agosta

Tournament
- Champions: Mercyhurst Lakers
- Runners-up: Syracuse Orange

Ice hockey seasons
- ← 09–10 11–12 →

The 2010–11 College Hockey America women's ice hockey season marked the continuation of the annual tradition of competitive ice hockey among College Hockey America members.

== Offseason ==
- August 2: Former NCAA All-American player Sabrina Harbec will join the Syracuse Orange coaching staff for the 2010-11 season.
- August 27: Mercyhurst Lakers player Meghan Agosta was announced as a finalist for the Women's Sports Foundation's 2010 Sportswoman of the Year Team Award. It is awarded to the top female athlete (NCAA, Olympic, professional) who has demonstrated exceptional play in helping her team win a championship.
- September 28: In the USA Today/USA Hockey Magazine Women's College Hockey Poll, the Mercyhurst Lakers have been voted as the pre-season Number 3.

== Preseason ==
=== College Hockey America Preseason Coaches' Poll ===
Rank	School	1st place votes
1	Mercyhurst	4
2	Syracuse	1
3	Niagara	0
4	Robert Morris	0
5	Wayne State	0

== Exhibition ==
Date	Opponent	Location	Score	Goal scorers
Sept 25	Mercyhurst vs. Wilfrid Laurier	Erie, PA	7-0, Mercyhurst	Cassea Schols, Pamela Zgoda, Kelley Steadman, Lauren Jones, Christie Cicero, Samantha Watt, Kylie Rossler

== Season standings ==
2010–11 College Hockey America standings
	Overall							Conference					
	GP	W	L	T	PTS	GF	GA	GP	W	L	T	GF	GA
#5 Mercyhurst†*	27	22	5	0	44	144	54	11	11	0	0	61	15
Niagara	28	9	14	5	23	41	68	12	6	4	2	23	26
Syracuse	28	11	13	4	26	71	79	10	5	4	1	23	23
Robert Morris	29	5	19	5	15	59	117	13	2	8	3	26	49
Wayne State	26	8	16	2	18	51	70	12	1	9	2	19	39
Championship: † indicates conference regular season champion * indicates conference tournament champion Current rankings: USCHO.com Division I women's poll

- Rankings based on number of wins in the conference

== Regular season ==
=== News and notes ===
==== October ====
- October 1: Mercyhurst Lakers player Meghan Agosta joined Jesse Scanzano as only the second Mercyhurst player to have 100 career assists. She picked up the assist in the second period of the game against WCHA team St. Cloud State.
- October 1: By tying Northwestern in the season opener, it marked the first time that the Syracuse Orange started the season unbeaten. Stefanie Marty had two goals in the game. Northeastern featured her twin sister Julia Marty. It was the first time the sisters had ever played against each other in their NCAA careers.
- October 8: With a 4-2 defeat of New Hampshire, the Orange is off to its best start in program history (1-0-1). In the win, senior transfer Ashley Cockell scored her first career goal for the Orange. Freshman goaltender Kallie Billadeau made 26 saves as she played in her first game for the Orange.
- October 15: Bailey Bram registered two assists, including her 100th career point, in a game against the Bemidji State Beavers. She became the 11th Lakers player to crack the century mark in the 4-0 win.
- October 16: In a 7-1 win against Connecticut, Isabel Menard recorded the first hat trick in Syracuse Orange women's ice hockey history (and added an assist).
- October 16: Dayna Newsom of Robert Morris accumulated a game-high three points (goal and two assists) against Northeastern. She tied her career high and it was her second multi-point game within the first five games of the season.
- As the Lakers went 6-1-0 in October 2010, Christine Bestland scored four goals, including two in a 7-3 defeat of the Robert Morris Colonials. In addition, she had six as¬sists. In her first game as a Laker, she scored a goal. She registered points in five of the seven games played and finished the month with a plus/minus rating of +13. For her efforts, she was recognized as College Hockey America's Rookie of the Month.

==== January ====
- January 15: Bailey Bram registered two goals and four assists for a career-high six points as Mercyhurst defeated Brown 12-0. Mercyhurst notched 12 goals in a game for the first time since the 1999-2000 season.
- January 21–22: Meghan Agosta recorded five points on two goals and three assists in a two-game sweep of Robert Morris. With the five point effort, Agosta is now just seven points away from breaking former Harvard player Julie Chu's mark of 285 points to become the NCAA all-time points leader.

==== February ====
- On February 4, 2011, Meghan Agosta became the all-time leading scorer in NCAA women's hockey history with three goals and one assist in Mercyhurst College's 6-2 win over Wayne State in Erie, Pennsylvania. Agosta's four points gave her 286 career points, one more than ex-Harvard forward Julie Chiu's record of 285 set in 2006-07. Agosta, who also owns the record for most short-handed goals and game-winning goals, added three assists in the Lakers' 3-1 win over Wayne State on February 5.
- February 25, 2011: Meghan Agosta scored her 151st career goal to become all-time leading goal scorer in NCAA history. She accomplished this in a 6-2 victory over the Robert Morris Colonials women's ice hockey program at the Mercyhurst Ice Center. She surpassed Harvard's Nicole Corriero, who set the record at 150 during the 2004-05 season. The goal was scored on the power play at 15:18 of the second period with the assist going to Bailey Bram. She later added her 152nd goal in the third period.

=== National rankings ===
Week of	WCHA school	USA Today poll	USCHO poll
September 27	Mercyhurst		3
October 4	Mercyhurst		3
October 11	Mercyhurst		1
October 18	Mercyhurst		3
October 25			
November 1			
November 8			
November 15			
November 22			
November 29			

== In season honors ==
=== Players of the week ===
Throughout the conference regular season, College Hockey America offices names a player of the week each Monday.

Week	Player of the week
October 5	Meghan Agosta, Mercyhurst
October 11	Meghan Agosta, Mercyhurst
October 18	Isabel Menard, Syracuse
October 25	Jill Szandzik, Wayne State
November 1	Meghan Agosta, Mercyhurst
November 8	Bailey Bram, Mercyhurst
November 15	
November 22	
November 29	
December 6	
December 13	Meghan Agosta
January 3	
January 10	Meghan Agosta, Mercyhurst
January 17	Bailey Bram, Mercyhurst
January 24	Meghan Agosta, Mercyhurst
January 31	Jess Jones, Mercyhurst
February 7	Meghan Agosta, Mercyhurst
February 14	Meghan Agosta, Mercyhurst
February 21	Ashley Cockell, Syracuse
February 28	Isabel Menard, Syracuse
March 7	Meghan Agosta, Mercyhurst

=== Defensive Players of the week ===
Week	Def. Player of the week
October 5	Hillary Pattenden, Mercyhurst
October 11	DeLayne Brian, Wayne State
October 18	DeLayne Brian, Wayne State
October 25	DeLayne Brian, Wayne State
November 1	Not awarded
November 8	Not awarded
November 15	
November 22	
November 29	
December 6	
December 13	Hillary Pattenden, Mercyhurst
January 3	
January 10	Hillary Pattenden, Mercyhurst
January 17	Jenni Bauer, Niagara
January 24	Jenni Bauer, Niagara
January 31	Hillary Pattenden, Mercyhurst
February 7	Hillary Pattenden, Mercyhurst
February 14	Hillary Pattenden, Mercyhurst
February 21	Jenni Bauer, Niagara
February 28	Kallie Bilodeau, Syracuse
March 7	Kallie Bilodeau, Syracuse

=== Rookies of the week ===
Throughout the conference regular season, College Hockey America offices names a rookie of the week each Monday.

Week	Player of the week
October 5	Thea Imbrogno, Robert Morris
October 11	Christine Bestland, Mercyhurst
October 18	Sadie St. Germain, Syracuse
October 25	Not awarded
November 1	Christine Bestland, Mercyhurst
November 8	Not awarded
November 15	
November 22	
November 29	
December 6	
December 13	Thea Imbrogno, Robert Morris
January 3	
January 10	Christine Bestland, Mercyhurst
January 17	Christie Cicero, Mercyhurst
January 24	Christine Bestland, Mercyhurst
January 31	Christine Bestland, Mercyhurst
February 7	Thea Imbrogno, Robert Morris
February 14	Thea Imbrogno, Robert Morris
February 21	Thea Imbrogno, Robert Morris
February 28	Margot Scharfe, Syracuse
March 7	Kallie Bilodeau, Syracuse

=== Monthly Awards ===
==== Player of the Month ====
Month	Player
October	Meghan Agosta, Mercyhurst
November	
December	Meghan Agosta, Mercyhurst
January	Meghan Agosta, Mercyhurst
February	Jesse Scanzano, Mercyhurst

==== Defensive Player of the Month ====
Month	Player
October	DeLayne Brian, Wayne State
November	
December	DeLayne Brian, Wayne State
January	Hillary Pattenden, Mercyhurst
February	Hillary Pattenden, Mercyhurst

==== Rookie of the Month ====
Month	Player
October	Christine Bestland, Mercyhurst
November	
December	Thea Imbrogno, Robert Morris
January	Christine Bestland, Mercyhurst
February	Thea Imbrogno, Robert Morris

== Postseason ==
=== 2011 CHA Women's Ice Hockey Tournament ===
Semifinals; March 5
1	Mercyhurst	3
4	Robert Morris	1
2	Niagara	0
3	Syracuse	1

Championship Game; March 6
1	Mercyhurst	5
3	Syracuse	4

=== Postseason awards ===
- Meghan Agosta was named CHA Tournament MVP
- Meghan Agosta, Mercyhurst, CHA Player of the Year
- Ashley Harper, Mercyhurst, Top Scholar-Athlete in College Hockey America
- Thea Imbrogno, Robert Morris, CHA Rookie of the Year
- Hillary Pattenden, Mercyhurst, 2010-11 CHA goaltending champion
- Michael Sisti, Mercyhurst, CHA coach of the year

==== First Team All-CHA ====
- Meghan Agosta, Mercyhurst
- Jenni Bauer, Niagara
- Vicki Bendus, Mercyhurst
- Cassea Scholls, 2010-11 First Team All-CHA selection
- Pamela Zgoda, Mercyhurst

==== Second Team All-CHA ====
- Bailey Bram, Mercyhurst
- Erica Owczarczak, Niagara
- Hillary Pattenden, Mercyhurst
- Jesse Scanzano, Mercyhurst
- Jill Szandzik, Wayne State

==== CHA All-Rookie team ====
- Christine Bestland, Mercyhurst
- Cari Coen, Wayne State
- Thea Imbrogno, Robert Morris
- Kristen Richards, Niagara

=== All-Americans ===
- Meghan Agosta, Mercyhurst, First Team selection

== See also ==
- National Collegiate Women's Ice Hockey Championship
- 2009–10 CHA women's ice hockey season
- 2010–11 WCHA women's ice hockey season
- 2010–11 ECAC women's ice hockey season
- 2010–11 Hockey East women's ice hockey season
