= Mercyhurst Preparatory School =

Location
- 538 East Grandview Boulevard; Erie, (Erie County), Pennsylvania 16504; United States; 42°6′4″N 80°3′2″W

Information
- Type: Private, Coeducational
- Religious affiliations: Roman Catholic; Sisters of Mercy
- Established: 1926
- President: Joseph Haas
- Principal: Brenda Karlinchak
- Chaplain: Deacon Ochalek
- Grades: 9-12
- Campus size: 7.25 acres (29,300 m^{2})
- Colors: Green and White
- Mascot: Louie The Laker
- Team name: Lakers
- Accreditation: Middle States Association of Colleges and Schools
- Publication: Chrysalis (literary/art magazine)
- Alumni: 6,200+
- Admissions Director: Allison Orlando
- Athletic Director: Dan Perfetto
- Website: www.mpslakers.com

Mercyhurst Preparatory School, commonly called Mercyhurst Prep or MPS, is a Catholic, coeducational secondary school located in Erie, Pennsylvania. In the Roman Catholic Diocese of Erie, the school is located behind Mercyhurst University on East Grandview Boulevard. It is a member of the International Baccalaureate program.

Mercyhurst Preparatory School is accredited by the Middle States Association under the Accreditation for Growth protocol through December 2024.

The U.S. Department of Education awarded MPS the Blue Ribbon School of Excellence Award in 1993 and again in 1998.

== History ==
Mercyhurst Seminary/Preparatory School traces its heritage to the foundress of the Sister of Mercy, Catherine McAuley. Catherine was born in 1778 into a financially secure family. Her father James, a devout Catholic, taught the fundamentals of faith by his good example of reaching out to the poor. Catherine’s comfortable life changed drastically after the death of her parents. She was sent to live with a Protestant family where she experienced poverty firsthand. She was able to retain her Catholic beliefs through her own strong will and the role modeling of her father.

Catherine accepted a position to serve as nurse companion to Mrs. Catherine Callaghan. The Callaghans were Quakers and encouraged service to the poor. Catherine was free to practice her faith, thus fertilizing the seeds planted by her father. The Callaghans adopted Catherine as their daughter and eventually converted to Catholicism. Upon their death, she inherited the equivalent of $1,000,000 in today's dollars.

Catherine continued her service to the needy while studying educational methods. She opened the House of Mercy on Baggot Street in Dublin, Ireland in 1831 with the goals of spiritual advancement, and service to the poor, sick and uneducated. Two hundred girls were enrolled in the school its first year with 12 women living and working in the building. The women began to call each other "sister" and were encouraged to begin a religious order. Catherine began her novitiate at the age of 52. In 1831, three novices professed their vows, giving birth to the Sisters of Mercy.

Within the 10 years of beginning her order and her death, Catherine McAuley established a total of nine convents in Ireland and England. She died in 1841 and was laid to rest in the ground with the poor.

Sisters of Mercy came to the United States in 1842 at the request of Bishop Michael O’Connor of Pittsburgh. While the sisters were en route from Ireland to the United States, they met Tobias Mullen, a seminarian. This chance meeting affected the education of young women years later. Tobias Mullen was later named Bishop and invited the Sisters of Mercy to the Erie Diocese in 1870 since he saw a need for Catholic education. In 1871, they opened Saint Joseph Academy, a private school for girls in Titusville, Pennsylvania. By the 1920s, the order and the school were growing rapidly, so the sisters set their sights on opening a school in Erie. Bishop John Mark Gannon suggested to Mother M. Borgia Egan, the Superior of the Sisters of Mercy in Titusville, that she raise $150,000 and come to Erie to found a school in 1921. Mother Borgia purchased 75 acres of farmland in remote southeast Erie.

Mercyhurst Seminary, an educational institution for college, high school, and grade school women opened in 1926. Hurst is old English for wooded hilltop, and seminary in Latin means a place where seeds are planted to grow. The Seminary was located on the first floor of Egan Hall, giving some 50 students total access to the facility. One lower grade was dropped each year until all students were graduated from eighth grade, leaving the seminary a high school and college institution.

When the Seminary was only three years old, the Great Depression hit the country. The school needed a fundraising project. According to Margaret McMahon, a 1933 Mercyhurst Seminary graduate, "The nuns produced and directed three musical comedies with college girls taking the main speaking and singing parts and the rest of the girls dancing and singing. The plays were three nights each year at a different theatre. I believe the Erie people were tired of all the sadness and enjoyed the live theatre."

Although Mercyhurst Seminary and Mercyhurst College originally shared the same facilities, plans for a separate building were set in motion in 1952. The Sisters, acting on a Middle States Association recommendation, broke ground on East Grandview Boulevard. The new building, now called Mercyhurst Preparatory School, opened its doors in 1963 to 170 women.

In 1974 Mercyhurst became coed, providing a private school alternative that had not been previously available to young people in Erie. In 1993 a building expansion program was begun, resulting in the addition of a new wing, including athletic facilities, offices, and a new auditorium. As the building expanded, so did Mercyhurst’s eye toward innovation with several new programs.

The U.S. Department of Education awarded MPS the Blue Ribbon School of Excellence Award in 1993 and again in 1998.

== Notable alumni ==
- Eric Hicks—professional football player, Kansas City Chiefs, New York Jets
- Jovon Johnson—professional football player, Canadian Football League, Winnipeg Blue Bombers
- Eric Sciotto—Broadway Performer, Appeared in the Original Broadway Casts of Annie Get Your Gun, Aida, Sweet Smell of Success, Cry-Baby and Pal Joey. Also on Broadway: 42nd Street, Sweet Charity, and A Chorus Line.
- Nick Adams (theatre actor)—Broadway performer who has received numerous accolades for his work in a variety of shows.
- Ron Palombi, Jr.—former professional bowler, six time PBA Tour winner.
