= Global Intelligence Forum =

- Formation: 2010; 16 years ago
- Location: Dungarvan, Ireland
- Region served: Worldwide
- Sponsor: Mercyhurst College

The Global Intelligence Forum was a bi-annual conference dedicated to exploring the best practices in intelligence analysis. The conference took place in Dungarvan, Ireland, the sister city of Erie, Pennsylvania, home of Mercyhurst College, the Mercyhurst College Institute for Intelligence Studies, and the Center for Intelligence Research Analysis and Training (CIRAT).

== Background ==
Mercyhurst University faculty created the conference to explore best practices in intelligence analysis. The founders feel that intelligence as a field of study is best explored through a holistic and global purview. Therefore, gathering intelligence professionals from around the world in a variety of disciplines to speak on their experiences and methods can provide insight into how best to perform quality intelligence analysis.

Future conferences will continue to focus on analytic best practices but will expand to explore intelligence as an enterprise essential to organizational leadership and learning.

== 2010 conference ==
=== Speakers ===
The speakers at the 2010 conference included members of the Mercyhurst College faculty, Irish and British government officials, and executives from private intelligence firms. The keynote speaker was former governor of Pennsylvania and first Secretary of Homeland Security Tom Ridge.

- Dermot Ahern TD, former Minister for Justice and Law Reform
- Sean Alyward, Secretary General, Department of Justice and Equality
- James Breckenridge, Dean, Walker School of Business; chair, Department of Intelligence Studies, Mercyhurst College, Erie, Pennsylvania, United States
- Anthony Campbell, Coordinator of the Global Futures Forum Community of Interest on the Practice and Organization of Intelligence; Former Head of Intelligence Assessment Secretariat, Privy Council Office, Canada
- John Deasy, Teachta Dála, Waterford Constituency, Ireland
- Dennis Dirkmaat, Diplomat, American Board of Forensic Anthropology; Director, Department of Applied Forensic Sciences, Mercyhurst College, Erie, PA, United States
- Liam Fahey, Adjunct Professor of Strategic Management, Babson College Wellesley, Massachusetts, United States; executive director, Leadership Forum Inc.
- Robert J. Heibel, executive director, Mercyhurst College Institute for Intelligence Studies
- Georgia Holmer, Pherson Associates, LLC
- Erik Kleinsmith, Program Director, Intelligence Analysis Training, Lockheed Martin; Former US Army Armour and Intelligence Officer - South Riding, Virginia, United States
- Justyna Krajewska, Project Manager, Amsterdam in Business, Amsterdam, Holland
- Catherine Lotrionte, associate director of the Institute for Law, Science and Global Security, Georgetown University; Former Counsel to the President's Foreign Intelligence Advisory Board, White House, Washington, DC, United States
- Mark M. Lowenthal, President and CEO of the Intelligence and Security Academy, LLC., Reston, Virginia, United States
- Stephen Marrin, Lecturer, Brunel University, West London, United Kingdom
- Don McDowell, Director, The Intelligence Study Centre, New South Wales, Australia
- Maxie McFarland, former Deputy Chief of Staff, Intelligence U.S. Army Training and Doctrine Command, Fort Monroe, Virginia, United States
- William McGill, Assistant Professor of Information Sciences and Technology at the Pennsylvania State University; Former intelligence officer with the Defense Intelligence Agency in Washington, DC, United States
- Commissioner Fachtna Murphy, Commissioner of the Garda Síochána (Ireland's National Police Service)
- Michael Murphy, Enterprise Ireland
- Ray O’Dwyer, County Manager, Waterford County Council
- Chris Pallaris, Head of OSINT, International Relations and Security Network (ISN), Zürich, Switzerland
- Joseph Pesce, CEO, Omnis, Inc., McLean, Virginia, United States
- Randy Pherson, President, Pherson Associates, LLC., Reston, Virginia, United States
- Jim Poole, Head of Analytical Capability and Outreach, Professional Head of Intelligence Analysis, UK Cabinet Office, London, United Kingdom
- Jim Power, Chief Economist, Friends First Group; professor, Finance and Economics on the Local Government MBA, Dublin City University; professor of economics on the Executive MBA, Michael Smurfit Graduate Business School - Dublin, Ireland
- Justine Marut Schober, visiting professor, Rockefeller University; Director of Academic Research, Hamot Medical Center; Pediatric Urologist, Hamot Medical Center, Erie, Pennsylvania, United States
- Kristan Wheaton, Associate Professor, Mercyhurst College, Erie, Pennsylvania, United States
- Mark Williams, Chief Technology Officer of Eastport Analytics, Arlington, Virginia, United States

=== Topics ===
The topics at the 2010 Global Intelligence Forum looked at best practices in intelligence analysis in the national security, law enforcement, and competitive arenas.

- Intelligence Analysis: The Business Context (Liam Fahey)
- Intelligence in Medicine (Dr. Justin Schober)
- Astrophysical Best Practices & Intelligence Analysis (Dr. Joseph Pesce, Ph.D.)
- Information in Economics and Finance (Jim Power)
- Terrorism and Internet (Maura Conway)
- PINS: Intelligence and Offender Management (Derek Lister)
- Structured Analysis for Security Risk Management (William L. McGill, Ph.D., PE)
- Best Practices for Technology Support to Analytic Best Practices (Mark A. Williams, Ph.D.)
- Improving Intelligence Analysis by Looking to the Medical Profession (Stephen Marrin, Ph.D.)
- Learning Best Practices from other Domains (Jim Poole)
- Seven Deadly Sins and Seven Cardinal Virtues of Analytical Best Practices (Anthony Campbell)
- From Intelligence to Policy - Creating a Perfect Business Climate in the Amsterdam Metropolitan Area (Justyna Krajewski)
- The Trouble with Best Practices (Chris Pallaris)
- Teaching Intelligence Best Practices (Erik Kleinsmith)
- Sharing the Findings: The Challenge for Strategic Analysts to Justify and Explain Themselves (Dom McDowell)
- How to Identify, Evaluate, and Teach Best Analytic Practices (Randy Pherson)
- Teaching Strategic Intelligence Through Games (Kristan J. Wheaton)

== Later conferences ==
The 2011 Global Intelligence Forum took place from 10 to 12 July 2011, in Dungarvan, Ireland.

A conference took place again in 2013.

The 2015 conference ran from 13 to 15 July in Dungarvan.

== Further partnerships ==
Each spring, Mercyhurst University students and faculty spend a term in Dungarvan as part of MU's Study Abroad scheme.

MU did consider opening a campus at Dungarvan and signed an MOU in 2016. In 2018, MU decided that the costs were too high and looked a smaller project in Ireland.

MU has established its first international base in Dungarvan; the base includes MU's European Centre for Intelligence Research, Analytics and Training.

== See also ==
- Mercyhurst University
- Mercyhurst University Institute for Intelligence Studies
