= 2010–11 Niagara Purple Eagles women's ice hockey season =

- Conference: CHA
- Home ice: Dwyer Arena

Rankings
- USA Today/USA Hockey Magazine: Not ranked
- USCHO.com/CBS College Sports: Not ranked

Record
- Overall: 0-0-0
- Home: 0-0-0
- Road: 0-0-0

Coaches and captains
- Head coach: Chris MacKenzie
- Assistant coaches: Josh Sciba; Shivaun Siegl

The Niagara Purple Eagles were unable to attempt to qualify for the NCAA Tournament for the second time in school history. Goaltender Jenni Bauer was named All-CHA First Team for the second consecutive season.

== Recruiting ==
- Niagara women's hockey head coach Chris MacKenzie announced the 2010-11 recruiting class. The second-year head coach brings in eight newcomers (five forwards, one defensemen and two goalies).

Player	Position	Nationality	Notes
Kaleigh Chippy	Forward	United States	Chippy was a member of the Ohio Flames. The Flames play in the Tier I Elite Hockey League (T1EHL), and Chippy finished first in the Tier 1 Elite in points in 2009
Katie Dods	Forward	Canada	Dods played for the Ottawa Senators of the CWHL. She was the 2008 High School Female Athlete of the Year in Kemptville, Ontario
Jessica Hitchcock	Forward	Canada	She was captain of the Southwest Wildcats of the PWHL. She was named outstanding Female Athlete of the Year at Sandwich Secondary School for four-straight seasons
Sarah Moses	Goalie	Canada	She played for the Kitchener-Waterloo Rangers and participated in the 2008 Winter and Summer Ontario Games. She was a 2006 Provincial and Silver Stick Gold Medalists Rorat
Kristen Richards	Forward	Canada	Richards was the captain of the Mississauga Jr. Chiefs. She was a 2008-09 Provincial Gold Medalist and a 2007-08 Provincial and PWHL Bronze Medalist
Paige Sasser	Goalie	United States	Sasser played for the National Sports Academy Mountaineers and attended the USA Hockey National Development Camp (2006, 2007). She was a three-time winner (2007-09) of the Top Goalie Award Hockey Night in Boston
May Wilkerson	Forward	United States	She attended the USA Hockey National Development Camp (2006, 2007, 2008). She was also a four-year letterman member of the Dakota Boys High School Varsity Team
Chelsea Witwicke	Defenseman	United States	Witwicke played for the Minnesota Jr. Whitecaps and was a four-year letterman in hockey at Roseville High School. She was an All-State and All-Conference selection during her junior and senior seasons

== Offseason ==
- August 12: Former Niagara player Ashley Riggs was selected second by the Burlington Barracudas in the 2010 CWHL Draft.

== Regular season ==
- Nov. 4 and 6: Daniela Dal Colle was the only Purple Eagle to score goals in two different games during the week. She registered Niagara’s first goal in a 4-2 loss to St. Lawrence. In Niagara’s upset win over No. 4 Mercyhurst, Dal Colle scored Niagara’s first goal of the game.
- Jenni Bauer made a total of 52 saves as the Purple Eagles swept Wayne State. It is Niagara’s first road sweep of the Warriors since February 2005. On January 14, Bauer made 27 saves as she earned her first career shutout. The following day, Bauer made 17 straight saves, and shut out the Warriors in the second and third period. Bauer finished the weekend with a 0.50 goals against average and .981 save percentage.
- January 22: The Purple Eagles beat the Orange, 3-1, in front of 770 fans at Dwyer Arena. Niagara extended its six-game unbeaten streak with its first-ever sweep of Syracuse. Said streak is the longest since the 2002 Frozen Four campaign and the Purple Eagles’ four-game win streak is their longest since they won four straight from Feb. 26-March 9, 2006. In addition, the game was Niagara's annual Pink the Rink game, to raise breast health awareness. For the second straight season, the Purple Eagles wore pink jerseys and for the second straight season Niagara defeated a conference rival, 3-1 (Robert Morris was defeated in 2010). Jenni Bauer made 28 saves as she picked up her second shutout win in three games with a 1–0 victory on the 21st. The following day, Bauer made 14 saves and allowed one goal. Bauer has allowed two goals in the last 239 minutes (four games). In the series, Bauer had a 0.50 goals against average, .977 save percentage and 42 saves. Kaleigh Chippy had a career-high weekend versus Syracuse. She was involved in all three goals as the Purple Eagles won by a 3–2 mark. In the third period, she scored a power-play goal with 4:41 remaining in the third period.

=== Standings ===
2010–11 College Hockey America standings
	Overall							Conference					
	GP	W	L	T	PTS	GF	GA	GP	W	L	T	GF	GA
#5 Mercyhurst†*	27	22	5	0	44	144	54	11	11	0	0	61	15
Niagara	28	9	14	5	23	41	68	12	6	4	2	23	26
Syracuse	28	11	13	4	26	71	79	10	5	4	1	23	23
Robert Morris	29	5	19	5	15	59	117	13	2	8	3	26	49
Wayne State	26	8	16	2	18	51	70	12	1	9	2	19	39
Championship: † indicates conference regular season champion * indicates conference tournament champion Current rankings: USCHO.com Division I women's poll

- Rankings based on number of wins in the conference

=== Schedule ===
Date	Opponent	Location	Time	Score	Goal scorers	Record	Conf. Record
10/1/2010	QUINNIPIAC	NIAGARA UNIV., N.Y.	7:00 PM	0-3	None	0-1-0	0-0-0
10/2/2010	QUINNIPIAC	NIAGARA UNIV., N.Y.	12:00 PM	1-3	Natasha Fryer	0-2-0	0-0-0
10/8/2010	at Minnesota State-Mankato	Mankato, Minn.	7:00 PM	2-3	Kaleigh Chippy, Kristen Richards	0-3-0	0-0-0
10/9/2010	at Minnesota State-Mankato	Mankato, Minn.	4:00 PM	0-0	None	0-3-1	0-0-0
10/22/2010	MAINE	NIAGARA UNIV., N.Y.	7:00 PM	1-3	0-4-1		
10/23/2010	MAINE	NIAGARA UNIV., N.Y.	2:00 PM	3-1	1-4-1		
10/29/2010	at New Hampshire	Durham, N.H.	7:00 PM	0-1 (OT)	1-5-1		
10/30/2010	at New Hampshire	Durham, N.H.	2:00 PM	0-2	1-6-1		
11/4/2010	ST. LAWRENCE	NIAGARA UNIV., N.Y.	7:00 PM	2-4	1-7-1		
11/12/2010	at Mercyhurst	Hamilton, N.Y.	3:00 PM	4-3	2-7-1	1-0-0	
11/12/2010	at Colgate	Hamilton, N.Y.	3:00 PM	2-1	3-7-1		
11/13/2010	at Colgate	Hamilton, N.Y.	1:00 PM	1-4	3-8-1		
11/19/2010	at RPI	Troy, N.Y.	7:00 PM	1-1 (OT)	3-8-2		
11/20/2010	at RPI	Troy, N.Y.	2:00 PM	1-1 (OT)	3-8-3		
11/26/2010	at Cornell	Ithaca, N.Y.	7:00 PM				
11/27/2010	at Cornell	Ithaca, N.Y.	2:00 PM				
12/3/2010	at Mercyhurst	Erie, Pa.	7:00 PM				
12/4/2010	at Mercyhurst	Erie, Pa.	2:00 PM				
12/10/2010	ROBERT MORRIS	NIAGARA UNIV., N.Y.	7:00 PM				
12/11/2010	ROBERT MORRIS	NIAGARA UNIV., N.Y.	2:00 PM				
1/14/2011	at Wayne State	Detroit, Mich.	7:00 PM				
1/15/2011	at Wayne State	Detroit, Mich.	2:00 PM				
1/21/2011	SYRACUSE	NIAGARA UNIV., N.Y.	7:00 PM				
1/22/2011	SYRACUSE	NIAGARA UNIV., N.Y.	2:00 PM				
1/28/2011	MERCYHURST	NIAGARA UNIV., N.Y.	7:00 PM				
1/29/2011	MERCYHURST	NIAGARA UNIV., N.Y.	2:00 PM				
2/4/2011	at Robert Morris	Moon Township, Pa.	7:00 PM				
2/5/2011	at Robert Morris	Moon Township, Pa.	2:00 PM				
2/18/2011	WAYNE STATE	NIAGARA UNIV., N.Y.	7:00 PM				
2/19/2011	WAYNE STATE	NIAGARA UNIV., N.Y.	2:00 PM				
2/25/2011	at Syracuse	Syracuse, N.Y.	7:00 PM				
2/26/2011	at Syracuse	Syracuse, N.Y.	2:00 PM				

==== Conference record ====
CHA school	Record
Mercyhurst	
Robert Morris	
Syracuse	
Wayne State	

== Postseason ==
Date	Opponent	Location	Time	Score	Record
3/3/2011	vs. First Round (2011 CHA Tournament)	Syracuse, N.Y.	TBA		

== Awards and honors ==
- Jenni Bauer, College Hockey America Goaltender of the Week (Week of January 17, 2011)
- Jenni Bauer, CHA Defensive Player of the Week (Week of January 24, 2011)
- Ashley Cockell, CHA Defensive Player of the Week (Week of February 21)

=== Postseason ===
- Jenni Bauer, All-CHA First Team
- Erica Owczarczak, All-CHA Second Team
- Kristen Richards, CHA All-Rookie Team
