= Mercyhurst University Institute for Intelligence Studies =

Intelligence program at Mercyhurst University

Coordinates: 42.1069°N 80.0487°W

The Ridge College of Intelligence Studies and Applied Sciences at Mercyhurst University (RIAP), located on the campus of Mercyhurst University in Erie, Pennsylvania, offers undergraduate and graduate studies programs in intelligence analysis. The program also offers graduate certificates in Applied Intelligence, Counterintelligence, and Law Enforcement Intelligence. The Intelligence Studies program "promotes the study of Intelligence in higher academic settings, while seeking to identify, promote, and employ best practices in the study and application of intelligence studies throughout its various disciplines (national security, law enforcement, business intelligence and academia)."

== History ==
The Institute for Intelligence Studies (IIS) was founded in February 2004 via help from a grant from the U.S. Department of Education's Fund for the Improvement of Post-Secondary Education (FIPSE). It was named after Tom Ridge, an Erie native and the first Secretary of Homeland Security. For a dozen years before the opening of the institute, then Mercyhurst College offered an undergraduate degree in intelligence studies as part of its ground-breaking Research/Intelligence Analyst Program (RIAP, or R/iap). Nestled within Mercyhurst College's Department of History, RIAP was the first non-governmental initiative of its kind in the United States. The program began in 1992 with only 14 students, but the competence of graduates eventually attracted the attention of the U.S. Intelligence Community.

The intense public debate in the United States immediately following the terrorist attacks of September 11, 2001, focused on intelligence analysts need for better training, which directed attention to Mercyhurst's already-growing program. RIAP's success at the undergraduate level led to the offering of a graduate program by 2004. The Federal Bureau of Investigation instituted a sabbatical program in 2005, through which senior analysts began to attend IIS-MU for advanced training.

For many years, no other school in the United States offered a degree designed specifically for intelligence analysts.

== Administration ==
Robert J. Heibel, a retired Federal Bureau of Investigation special agent, founded the undergraduate program in 1992 and is now Executive Director of IIS-MU.

John Olszowka, Ph.D., professor of history who earned his degree from Binghamton University, is the current dean of the Ridge College.

== Undergraduate Program in Intelligence Studies ==
The Bachelor of Arts in Intelligence Studies is a four-year interdisciplinary baccalaureate program which prepares a graduate to become an entry-level analyst for employment in the government or the private sector. The undergraduate program, which continues to be referred to as RIAP, consists of nine core intelligence-related courses, plus 13 interdisciplinary courses.

As of 2014, there are approximately 300 students enrolled in the undergraduate program. This includes students from across the United States as well as international students. The students primarily come from the Ohio-Pennsylvania-NY area.

== Certificate in Intelligence Studies ==
IIS-MU has developed a distance-learning, graduate-level certificate program for use by contracting organizations in the Washington, D.C. metropolitan area. As of 2009, there are approximately 77 certificate students in the program.

== Graduate Program in Applied Intelligence ==
The Masters of Science in Applied Intelligence is a thirty-four or thirty-six-credit two-year program designed to prepare graduates to pursue analyst careers in law enforcement, national security and competitive intelligence. As of 2009, there are approximately 53 graduate students in the Applied Intelligence program.

The graduate program's Strategic Intelligence class participated in a joint research project with the National Intelligence Council in 2006-2007 entitled The Global Disease Threat and Its Implications for the United States. The project involved the development of a Mercyhurst wiki consisting of over 1,000 pages of analysis on the threat of global disease to the United States.

== Professors ==
Current professors include retired or former members of the Office of the Director of National Intelligence, the Raleigh Police Department, the US Navy, the US Department of Energy, the National Drug Intelligence Center, the US State Department, the United States Army, the Central Intelligence Agency, the Federal Bureau of Investigation, Canada's Department of National Defense, the Turkish Police Academy, Fortune 50 companies, and the Erie Times-News.

== Center for Information Research Analysis and Training ==
The Center for Information Research Analysis And Training|Center for Information Research And Training (CIRAT) is a nonprofit arm of Mercyhurst University whose mission is to develop contracts, grants and partnerships that test and enhance the capabilities of RIAP students, staff, facilities, and systems.

Examples of research CIRAT has conducted:

- Study of money-laundering operations for the U.S. Department of the Treasury's Financial Enforcement Network.
- Case studies developed for the 1996 National Institute of Justice (NIJ) research project Pre-Incident Indicators of Terrorist Incidents

== Selected achievements ==
The department enjoys success from both its students, former students and faculty members. Noteworthy achievements include:

Amanda Post, an IIS-MU graduate, joined the ranks of the Federal 100, which recognizes individuals from government, industry and academia who have made significant contributions to the federal informational technology community. The awards, decided by a distinguished panel of judges, are bestowed annually by the 1105 Government Information Group and Federal Computer Week.

In February 2009, Assistant Professor Stephen Marrin presented two papers at international conferences. The first paper, entitled "Reconceptualizing the Relationship Between CIA's Analysis and Decisionmaking: The Case of Pre-9/11 Terrorism Intelligence" was presented at a conference in Dublin, Ireland on The CIA & US Foreign Policy: Reform, Representations and New Approaches to Intelligence. The second, entitled "The Intelligence-Policy Interface and Iraq in Britain and the United States" was given at a workshop on Intelligence, Policy and Comparative Politics in London.

Students in a class led by Assistant Professor Kristan Wheaton earned certificates of appreciation from coalition forces and the Iraqis for a 1,000-page WIKI-based analysis product they completed for intelligence authorities in Baghdad. The project, which examined Middle Eastern governments in the region and their reaction to events unfolding in Iraq, was provided to authorities in Iraq by another intelligence studies faculty member, U.S. Army Maj. Daniel Mulligan, who returned to Mercyhurst in early February after a year's tour of duty in Iraq. Mulligan presented the certificates on Monday, February 16, 2009 at the intelligence studies building on campus.

Six IIS-MU students won the first-ever ODNI-sponsored 2008 Open Source Challenge which gave the students one week to thoroughly research, document and convincingly answer the question: "Is Al Qaeda a cohesive organization with strong and centralized control, intent and direction?" The team's answer surpassed those of more than 20 other competitors, some veterans of the U.S. intelligence community. Another team shared the first prize with Mercyhurst after it answered the second question option in the contest. That team, from iJET Intelligent Risk Systems, had two members who graduated from IIS-MU's graduate program.

== Mercyhurst University Institute for Intelligence Studies Press ==
IIS-MU Press opened as a publishing house in 2005. IIS-MU cited the need for additional textbooks in the field as its reason for getting into publishing. Four books have been published as of February 2009 and others are in the works.

== Great Lakes Intelligence Initiative ==
IIS-MU founded the Great Lakes Intelligence Initiative (GLII) in 2006 to promote the development and utilization of knowledge worker skills in the schools and businesses of northwestern Pennsylvania.

== Global Intelligence Forum ==
IIS-MU founded and sponsors the Global Intelligence Forum each year in Dungarvan, Ireland. The conference seeks to find the best practices in intelligence analysis and see how they can be applied to other industries and companies.

== Affiliations ==
- Institute of Nuclear Materials Management (INMM)
- The Association of Former Intelligence Officers (AFIO)
- The International Association for Intelligence Education (IAFIE)
- The International Association for Law Enforcement Intelligence Analysts (IALEIA)
- The Society of Competitive Intelligence Professionals (SCIP)
- The International Relations And Security Network (ISN)
