= 2010–11 Robert Morris Colonials women's ice hockey season =

Robert Morris Colonials women's ice hockey

- Conference: CHA

Rankings
- USA Today/USA Hockey Magazine: Not ranked
- USCHO.com/CBS College Sports: Not ranked

Record
- Overall: 1-1-0
- Home: 1-1-0

Coaches and captains
- Head coach: Nate Handrahan
- Assistant coaches: Logan Bittle

The 2010–11 season was not very successful for the Robert Morris Colonials women's ice hockey team, as they won 5 matches in the College Hockey America (CHA) league and lost 19. Nevertheless, new recruit Thea Imbrogno won multiple CHA awards.

== Offseason ==
- August 16: Logan Bittle, a member of the RMU men’s inaugural team in 2004-05 has been hired as an assistant coach for the women's team.

=== Recruiting ===
Player	Nationality	Position	Defense
Thea Imbrogno	Canada	Forward	Played for the Mississauga Jr. Chiefs
Anneline Lauziere	Canada	Forward	Played for the London Jr. Devilettes
Brandi Pollock	Canada	Defense	Played for the Westman Wildcats
Kylie St. Louis	Canada	Defense	Played for the Southwest Wildcats

== Regular season ==
- October 15: The Colonials hosted the Northeastern Huskies women's ice hockey program for the first time in school history.
- October 16: Northeastern beat the Colonials by a 4-3 margin in the RMU Hockey Showcase at CONSOL Energy Center. It was the third consecutive season in which the Colonials participated in the showcase, but their first appearance at CONSOL Energy Center. Senior forward Sara O’Malley scored for RMU and became just the second Colonial in school history to reach the 40-goal plateau.
  - October 16: Dayna Newsom accumulated a game-high three points (goal and two assists) against Northeastern on October 16. She tied her career high and it was her second multi-point game within the first five games of the season.
- Oct 22-23: Sara O’Malley scored both goals for the Colonials in a 3-2 loss versus Cornell for the 20th multiple-point game of her career. The following day, she registered an assist at 17:47 in the third period. It was her 75th career point, which tied her with Kristen Miles for the all-time mark in career points in Robert Morris history.
- October 29 marked the CHA opening game for both the Mercyhurst Lakers and Robert Morris Colonials. Meghan Agosta scored two goals and notched an assist in a 7-3 defeat of the Colonials. With the win, the Lakers extended their all time winning streak to 24-0-0 all-time against the Robert Morris Colonials. Agosta’s goals came during a six-goal first period for the Lakers, and her two goals were separated by just 20 seconds. The goals happened at the 19:27 and 19:47 marks.
- Dec 3-4: Kristen DiCiocco played all 125 minutes in net while helping Robert Morris to a win and a tie at Minnesota State. She accrued a 1.44 GAA while making 48 saves and posting a .941 save per¬centage. In addition, she held the Mavericks without a power-play goal for the entire weekend. In addition, Brianna Delaney played a role in every Colonial goal as she posted her second four-point weekend of the season. She assisted on the game-tying goal before scoring the game-winner to lead RMU to a 2-1 victory in the series opener Friday. The following day, she registered a pair of goals Saturday to help the Colonials come back from an early deficit to claim a 2-2 tie. With her two points on Friday, Delaney has moved into second place on the all-time RMU points list and finished the weekend with 78 points for her career.
- December 10–11: Imbrogno recorded a goal in both of the Colonials games. In the two game series, she led the team in shots on goal (9) and shooting percentage (.222) while tying for the team lead with a +2 plus/minus.
- January 21–22: Despite the Colonials being swept by Mercyhurst, Thea Imbrogno collected a goal and an assist in the series. She now has registered four points in three contests against the nationally- ranked Lakers this season and tops Robert Morris with nine points in conference play. In the January 21st defeat, Brianna Delaney registered her team-leading seventh multi-point game of the season. She had a goal and an assist in the 6-3 setback. It was her 22nd career multi-point game which allowed her to become the first player in Robert Morris history to tally three 20-point seasons in her career. In addition, she also combined with her younger sister, Cobina, to assist on a goal for the second time this season.
- January 8, 2011: Against the University of Connecticut Huskies, Brianna Delaney scored the first two goals of the game. Both goals were assisted by her sister Cobina Delaney. This was the first time in their careers at Robert Morris that Cobina had assisted on a goal by Brianna. Both goals were scored within eight minutes of the game. With the two goals, Brianna became just the second Colonial to surpass the 80 point plateau in her career. In addition, she became just the third Colonials player to score 40 career goals as her second goal of the game was the 40th of her Robert Morris University career. In addition, it was the 21st multi-point game of her career.
- January 9, 2011: In the second consecutive game versus Connecticut, Brianna picked up a third period assist to break the all-time Robert Morris University school record for assists in a career. It was her 42nd assist of her career. She assisted on a goal by her younger sister Cobina. This was Cobina’s fifth goal of the season, all of which have been assisted by Brianna.
- February 4–5: Versus Niagara, Imbrogno assisted on the game’s opening goal February 4 for RMU. She was part of the two-goal rally within the final 10 minutes of regulation February 5 against Niagara. She assisted on the first goal and proceeded to score the game-tying goal with just 87 seconds remaining when she scored on a rebound. The multi-point game was the fourth of her rookie campaign. In addition, she reached the 20 point plateau. She now has a team-leading 12 points in 11 conference contests.
- February 11–12: On February 11, Thea Imbrogno had her second consecutive multi-point performance when she collected a goal and an assist during a nine-minute span. It was her fifth multi-point performance of the season. The following day, she assisted on the goal that began RMU’s comeback and led to a 2-1 victory. She now has a six-game point streak, which ties her for the second-longest mark in program history.
- February 25, 2011: Meghan Agosta scored her 151st career goal to become all-time leading goal scorer in NCAA history. She accomplished this in a 6-2 victory over the Robert Morris Colonials women’s ice hockey program at the Mercyhurst Ice Center.

=== Standings ===
2010–11 College Hockey America standings
	Overall							Conference					
	GP	W	L	T	PTS	GF	GA	GP	W	L	T	GF	GA
#5 Mercyhurst†*	27	22	5	0	44	144	54	11	11	0	0	61	15
Niagara	28	9	14	5	23	41	68	12	6	4	2	23	26
Syracuse	28	11	13	4	26	71	79	10	5	4	1	23	23
Robert Morris	29	5	19	5	15	59	117	13	2	8	3	26	49
Wayne State	26	8	16	2	18	51	70	12	1	9	2	19	39
Championship: † indicates conference regular season champion * indicates conference tournament champion Current rankings: USCHO.com Division I women's poll

- Rankings based on number of wins in the conference

=== Schedule ===
Date	Opponent	Score	Goal scorers	Record	Conf. Record
10/1/2010	Providence	5-4	Dayna Newsom, Maria Stoa (2), Thea Imbrogno, Cobina Delaney	1-0-0	0-0-0
10/2/2010	Providence	2-5	Sara O'Malley, Cobina Delaney	1-1-0	0-0-0
10/08/2010	Ohio State	1-4		1-2-0	0-0-0
10/09/2010	Ohio State	1-4		1-3-0	0-0-0
10/16/2010	Northeastern	4-6		1-4-0	0-0-0
10/17/2010	Northeastern	3-4		1-5-0	0-0-0

==== Conference record ====
CHA school	Record
Mercyhurst	
Niagara	
Syracuse	
Wayne State	

== Postseason ==
- On March 4, 2011, Thea Imbrogno was named the CHA Rookie of the Year. She became the student-athlete in program history to win a major postseason College Hockey America (CHA) award.

== Awards and honors ==
- Kristen DiCiocco, College Hockey America Goaltender of the Week (Week of December 6)
- Thea Imbrogno, CHA Rookie of the Week (Week of October 5)
- Thea Imbrogno, CHA Rookie of the Week (Week of November 15, 2010)
- Thea Imbrogno, College Hockey America Rookie of the Week (Week of December 12, 2010)
- Thea Imbrogno, CHA Rookie of the Week (Week of February 7, 2011)
- Thea Imbrogno, CHA Rookie of the Week (Week of February 21)
- Thea Imbrogno, 2011 CHA Rookie of the Year
- Thea Imbrogno, 2011 CHA All-Rookie Team
- Thea Imbrogno, 2011 All-CHA Second team

== See also ==
- 2009–10 Robert Morris Colonials women's ice hockey season
