= 2010–11 Wayne State Warriors women's ice hockey season =

- Conference: CHA

Rankings
- USA Today/USA Hockey Magazine: Not ranked
- USCHO.com/CBS College Sports: Not ranked

Record

Coaches and captains
- Head coach: Jim Fetter
- Assistant coaches: Nicolette Franck; Allison Rutledge

During the 2010-11 season of Wayne State Warriors women's ice hockey, a defunct American college ice hockey program represented at Wayne State University, Delayne Brian distinguished herself as a defensive player, making large numbers of saves and winning many awards. The championship was won by Mercyhurst Lakers of Pennsylvania.

== Offseason ==
- August 27: Former Wayne State Warriors player Brandi Frakie died at the age of 22. Frakie played with the Warriors from 2006 to 2009 and was a CHA all-rookie team selection in 2006-07.

=== Recruiting ===
Player	Nationality	Position	Defense
Rachel Hardwick	United States	Forward	Averaged a point per game in 2008-09 with Little Caesars
Katie Gaskin	Canada	Defense	One of two captains for the Durham Jr. Lightning during the 2009-10 season
Cari Coen	United States	Forward/Defense	Played for the L.A. Selects during the 2009-10 season Helped the Selects win two regional titles in 2007-08 and 2008-09
Lisa Marshall	United States	Goaltender	Played with both Little Caesars and Phillips Exeter Academy in New Hampshire for the third season in 2009-10

== Regular season ==
- Delayne Brian made 26 saves in a 3-0 victory over St. Cloud State to earn her fifth career shutout. The following day, she had 39 saves in a 1-0 loss to the Minnesota Golden Gophers. In both games, Brian had a 0.50 goals-against average and a .985 save percentage.
- October 15: Alyssa Baldin scored her 20th career goal. With the goal, she moves into a tie for ninth all-time at Wayne State.
- October 16: DeLayne Brian stopped 40 shots from Boston University. It was two shy of her single game career-high. In the two game series, she had a total of 75 saves.
- Jill Szandzik registered seven points (one goal and six assists) in the Warriors sweep of the Colgate Raiders. Five of her points came on the power play. She scored the game-winning goal on Saturday, October 23 and assisted on the game winner the following day. Her four assists in the 4-0 win tied the program’s single game record.
- DeLayne Brian made 71 saves in a two-game sweep at Colgate. In the 4-0 triumph, she had 31 saves while earning her second shutout of the season. It was her sixth career shutout. The following day, she registered 40 saves, as the Warriors triumphed by a 5–3 mark. In addition, she held Colgate’s power-play unit scoreless in nine chances during the series. With the two wins, she moved into a tie for second all time in WSU career victories with 24.
- In October 2010, DeLayne Brian was the starting goalie in all eight of the Warriors games. Among the highlights, she accumulated 61 saves on Oct. 1–2 against Bemidji State. On top of her 61 saves, she held the Beavers to 1-for-13 on the power play. On October 8, she registered her fifth career shutout as she blanked St. Cloud State. Against nationally ranked Boston University, she had a career-high 75 saves in the two game series. Against the Colgate Raiders, she would earn another shutout as she notched 31 saves (on October 22). She led all CHA netminders with a .932 save percentage and ranked third in the nation during October with 272 saves.
- January 21–22: Delayne Brian made 59 saves in a series split versus # 10 ranked Quinnipiac. She stopped 28 shots in a 2-1 win, as Wayne State snapped an 18-game winless streak against ranked opponents. Brian finished with 31 saves on Saturday. For Brian, it was her 16th performance with 30-plus saves this season. Her 700 saves are fourth-most in the nation and the second-highest single-season total in program history.
- On February 4, 2011, Meghan Agosta became the all-time leading scorer in NCAA women's hockey history with three goals and one assist in Mercyhurst College's 6-2 win over Wayne State in Erie, Pennsylvania. Warriors goalie DeLayne Brian made 28 saves in the second period. She broke the program record for saves in a period, previously held by Kelly Zamora who had 24 at Mercyhurst on Feb. 2, 2002. Brian finished five saves short of the single-game mark set by Tina Thibideau (56 saves) at Harvard on Jan. 4, 2003.
- February 4: Ciara Lee is one of 25 nominees for the 2011 BNY Mellon Wealth Management Hockey Humanitarian Award.

=== Standings ===
2010–11 College Hockey America standings
	Overall							Conference					
	GP	W	L	T	PTS	GF	GA	GP	W	L	T	GF	GA
#5 Mercyhurst†*	27	22	5	0	44	144	54	11	11	0	0	61	15
Niagara	28	9	14	5	23	41	68	12	6	4	2	23	26
Syracuse	28	11	13	4	26	71	79	10	5	4	1	23	23
Robert Morris	29	5	19	5	15	59	117	13	2	8	3	26	49
Wayne State	26	8	16	2	18	51	70	12	1	9	2	19	39
Championship: † indicates conference regular season champion * indicates conference tournament champion Current rankings: USCHO.com Division I women's poll

- Rankings based on number of wins in the conference

=== Schedule ===
Date	Opponent	Location	Time	Score	Goal scorers	Record
10/1/2010	Bemidji State	Wayne, Mich.	7:00 p.m.	0-3		0-1-0
10/2/2010	Bemidji State	Wayne, Mich.	2:00 p.m.	4-2	Juile Ingratta (2), V Laramee-Paquette, Alyssa Baldin	1-1-0
10/08/2010	St. Cloud State	St. Cloud, MN	7:00 pm	3-0	Julie Ingratta (2), Lauren Ragen (1)	2-1-0
10/09/2010	Minnesota	Minneapolis, MN		0-1		2-2-0
10/15/2010	Boston University	Boston, MA		2-7		2-3-0
10/16/2010	Boston University	Boston, MA		1-4		2-4-0
10/22/2010	Colgate	Hamilton, NY				
10/23/2010	Colgate	Hamilton, NY				
11/12/2010	Robert Morris	Pittsburgh, PA				
11/13/2010	Robert Morris	Pittsburgh, PA				
11/19/2010	Mercyhurst	Detroit, MI				
11/20/2010	Mercyhurst	Detroit, MI				

==== Conference record ====
CHA school	Record
Mercyhurst	
Niagara'	
Robert Morris	
Syracuse	

== Awards and honors ==
- DeLayne Brian, CHA Defensive Player of the Week (Week of October 11)

- DeLayne Brian, CHA Defensive Player of the Week (Week of October 18)
- DeLayne Brian, CHA Defensive Player of the Week (Week of October 25)
- DeLayne Brian, CHA Defensive Player of the Month (October 2010)
- Delayne Brian, Runner-up, CHA Defensive Player of the Month, January 2011
- DeLayne Brian, Wayne State University women's athlete of the week (Week of November 29, 2010)
- DeLayne Brian, Wayne State University women's athlete of the week (Week of January 3, 2011)
- DeLayne Brian, Wayne State University women's athlete of the week (Week of February 7, 2011)
- Jill Szandzik, CHA Offensive Player of the Week (Week of October 25)

=== Postseason ===
- Jill Szandzik, Second Team All-CHA
- Cari Coen, CHA All-Rookie Team

Cari Coen named Rookie of the Year 2010-11
