= 2008–09 Syracuse Orange women's ice hockey season =

- Conference: 5 CHA
- Home ice: Tennity Ice Pavilion; Onondaga County War Memorial

Rankings
- USA Today/USA Hockey Magazine: Not ranked
- USCHO.com/CBS College Sports: Not ranked

Record
- Overall: 9–16–3

Coaches and captains
- Head coach: Paul Flanagan
- Assistant coaches: Erin O'Brien; Graham Thomas
- Captain(s): Stefanie Marty, Julie Rising

The 2008–09 Syracuse Orange women's ice hockey season was the first in Syracuse history.

== Offseason ==
On March 6, 2008, it was announced that the Orange would join College Hockey America. Syracuse was the fifth school to join the conference for women's hockey.

Paul Flanagan, who coached the St. Lawrence Skating Saints women's ice hockey program to five NCAA Frozen Four appearances was appointed as the first coach for the Orange women's ice hockey program. Flanagan had been the 2001 ECAC and American Hockey Coaches Association Coach of the Year. For the inaugural season, Flanagan was joined by Graham Thomas, who played for Mannheim Jung Adler in Germany, and Erin O'Brien, a two-time All-American at Plattsburgh State, an NCAA Division III school for women's ice hockey.

== Regular season ==
Some of the first players for the team were transfer players from other schools. Gabrielle Beaudry, transferred to the Orange from Boston College. Cheyenne Bojeski was a transfer from rival Mercyhurst, while Julie Rising came to the Orange from Bemidji State. Lucy Schoedel and Stefany Marty were both transfers from New Hampshire Wildcats women's ice hockey.

The Orange's inaugural season was in 2008–09, and the team played its first ever game on October 1, 2008. On Wednesday, October 1, 2008, Lucy Schoedel recorded 34 saves and Megan Skelly scored the first goal in Syracuse women's ice hockey history. The goal was scored nine seconds into the school's first women's hockey game at Colgate. Despite holding a 2–0 lead in the game, the Orange lost to Colgate by a score of 4–3.

The following two games were against the eventual NCAA champion Wisconsin Badgers on October 2 and 3. Despite losing both games, Lucy Schoedel made seventy five saves in two games. A week later, Syracuse played in its first ever College Hockey America conference game. The Orange took on the Robert Morris Colonials. Lucy Schoedel recorded her 100th career save (and totaling 130 stops in just four games) in a 1–0 losing effort.

Team captain Stefanie Marty scored her first goal for Syracuse on October 17. It was a 4–2 loss at Quinnipiac. Of note, Cheyenne Bojeski also scored her first ever goal for Syracuse. The following day, co-captains Julie Rising and Stefanie Marty would both score as Syracuse won its first ever game by a 2–0 tally.

=== Exhibition games ===
- On November 28 and 29, Syracuse travelled to Ottawa, Ontario to participate in two exhibition games with two Canadian universities. The Orange defeated the Carleton Ravens women's ice hockey team by a score of 3–1 on the 28th but felt to the Ottawa Gee Gees women's ice hockey team in a 4–3 overtime loss.
- The Orange played the McGill Martlets women's ice hockey team in Montreal, Quebec. McGill was ranked number one in Canada, but Syracuse provided a valiant effort. The Martlets outshot the Orange by a tiny margin of 30–28 and won the game by a score of 4–2. Julie Rising and Megan Skelly each had two points for the Orange.

== Roster ==
=== Seniors ===
Nikki Leone and Rachel Tilford were the seniors for the Orange. Both fourth-year members factored into the last Syracuse goal scored in the regular season. It was the Orange's sixth consecutive victory, and was played at the Onondaga County War Memorial.

== Player stats ==
Stefanie Marty was the leading scorer for the Orange with 22 points.
