= Borgia Egan =

American Sister of Mercy and academic, foundress of Mercyhurst University

Mary Borgia Egan, R.S.M.
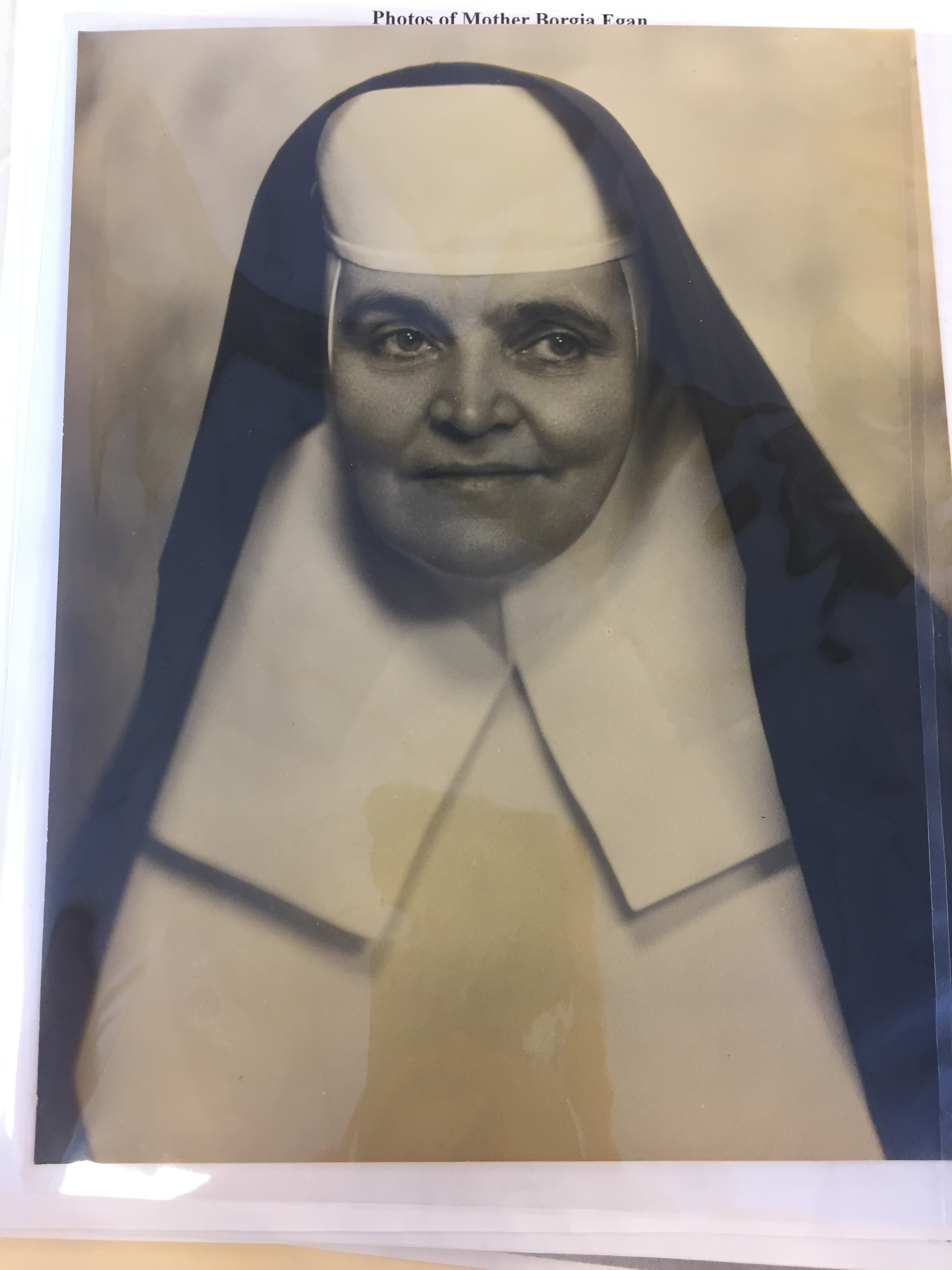
- Mother Borgia c. 1930

Personal life
- Born: Catherine Egan; March 22, 1876 DuBois, Pennsylvania, United States
- Died: February 11, 1962 (aged 85) Erie, Pennsylvania, United States
- Resting place: Hydetown, Pennsylvania, United States
- Education: Catholic University of America; Duquesne University
- Known for: Foundress of Mercyhurst University

Religious life
- Religion: Roman Catholicism
- Order: Sisters of Mercy

Mary Borgia Egan, R.S.M. (March 22, 1876 – February 11, 1962) was an American member of the Sisters of Mercy. She founded Mercyhurst University in 1926 and served as its first president. As an advocate of women's higher education, she believed that women should have the same chances and opportunities that men do. This was the foundation of her journey, along with her Catholic faith.

== Life ==
She was born Catherine Egan on March 22, 1876 into a prominent family of DuBois, Pennsylvania. In 1891, at the age of fifteen, she joined the congregation of the Sisters of Mercy, then under the authority of the Bishop of Erie, who were based in Titusville at that time. After her novitiate, she was assigned to teach in Erie, Pennsylvania, and became a well-known and well-liked member of the diocese. When Catholic University of America started to admit Religious Sisters from teaching orders, she was among the first to apply, getting first her bachelor's degree, followed by a doctorate from Duquesne University.

In 1917 Eganwas elected as Mother Superior of the Sisters of Mercy of Erie.

Egan was a very enthusiastic speaker for women's higher education and with the assistance and support of Bishop Gannon, she sought to establish an institution of higher education for women in Erie.

Egan founded Mercyhurst College in 1926 and became the first president of the institution, serving from 1926 to 1927. She was known as the "6 foot nun" because she towered over all other students and faculty. She was described by her students as having "a towering stance and ready sense of humor combined with this intellectual prowess to make her an unforgettable woman."

Egan suffered a stroke in 1956 and was hospitalized for the next three years. She died at age 85 on February 11, 1962.

== Mercyhurst University ==
Borgia Egan brought the Sisters of Mercy to Erie, Pennsylvania, in the United States to help spread the values of the Sisters throughout the world. After they arrived in Erie, Bishop Gannon of the Diocese of Erie approached Egan about creating an institution that focused on the women in the community. With the help of the Sisters of Mercy, Egan took out all of the money from the bank and bought a large piece of land to fulfill Gannon's wishes. On 8 September 1924, construction started for the new college. The building itself was designed by architect F. Ferdinand Durang in a Tudor Gothic style. Egan wanted the exterior to have as much detail as the interior of the building. However, near the end of the project, the workers went on strike and the Sisters of Mercy in Erie had to complete the project on their own.

Mercyhurst College was founded on 7 September 1926 in Erie, Pennsylvania. Originally an all Catholic, women’s institution, Mercyhurst College opened with the help of the Sisters of Mercy in the Diocese of Erie. With Egan as the first president, the college sought to enhance the learning experiences of young women and to give them a chance to use their potential. There was only 23 students that attended the college when it first opened, but the number of students grew soon enough. Egan remained president of Mercyhurst College from 1926 to 1927, all while maintaining the position of Mother Superior for the Sisters of Mercy in the Diocese of Erie.

Mercyhurst College became a co-ed institution in 1969. On 25 January 2012, Mercyhurst College was officially renamed Mercyhurst University. There is now a Mother Borgia Egan scholarship, titled "Mother M. Borgia Egan Endowed Scholarship", that is given out each year to a student who is seeking out in pursuing a career of teaching and is following in the footsteps of Egan.
