= Mercyhurst University =

Catholic college in Erie, Pennsylvania, US

Coordinates: 42.10520°N 80.05373°W

- Former names: Mercyhurst College (1926–2012)
- Motto: Latin: Carpe diem (Seize the day)
- Type: Private university
- Established: 1926; 100 years ago
- Accreditation: MSCHE
- Religious affiliation: Roman Catholic (Sisters of Mercy)
- Academic affiliations: Conference for Mercy Higher Education; ACCU; NAICU
- President: Kathleen Getz
- Students: 2,632 (fall 2024)
- Undergraduates: 2,274 (fall 2024)
- Postgraduates: 358 (fall 2024)
- Location: Erie, Pennsylvania, U.S.
- Campus: Urban, 74 acres (30 hectares)
- Colors: Blue, green, & white
- Nickname: Lakers
- Sporting affiliations: NCAA Division I – NEC: Atlantic Hockey America; CWPA
- Mascot: Luke the Laker
- Website: mercyhurst.edu

Mercyhurst University is a private Catholic university in Erie, Pennsylvania, United States.

== History ==
On September 20, 1926 (100 years ago), Mercyhurst College opened its doors just a few blocks away from the city's southern boundary. It was founded by the Sisters of Mercy of the Diocese of Erie, who were led by Borgia Egan, who became the first president of Mercyhurst College.

On October 5, 1928, two years later, the college received its charter.

In 1963, the college prep department separated from the university to form Mercyhurst Preparatory School, which is located behind the university.

On February 3, 1969, the board of trustees voted to make Mercyhurst a coed college.

From its foundation in 1926 until 1972, members of the Sisters of Mercy had been presidents of the college. After 1972, lay presidents led the college.

On March 27, 1991, Mercyhurst purchased the 100-year-old Redemptorist Seminary in North East and turned it into a branch campus, offering associate degrees and one-year certificates.

Among its five campuses, enrollment has grown to over 4,000 students instructed by 168 faculty. The endowment has increased to more than US$20 million and its budget is more than US$85 million.

In February 1996, the Mary D'Angelo Performing Arts Center opened.

In fall 2002, the $7.5 million Audrey Hirt Academic Center opened on the southeast edge of campus, a building funded largely through the college's $22.8 million capital campaign.

In August 2005, the $5 million Michele and Tom Ridge Health and Safety Building was dedicated at Mercyhurst North East. A $1.3 million residential apartment complex also opened in time for the North East campus' academic year.

Also in 2005, the board of trustees authorized the purchase of 400 acres (160 hectares) in Girard as the first step towards developing Mercyhurst West, a two-year college serving western Erie County, northwestern Crawford County and northeastern Ohio.

In 2006, the board of trustees elected Thomas J. Gamble as the 11th president of Mercyhurst College. Gamble, who previously served as vice president of academic affairs at the college, assumed the presidency on March 1, 2006.

In fall 2008, the construction of the Frances Warde Hall began. The US$14 million freshman residence hall opened in the fall of 2009. The 100,000-square-foot (9,300 m^{2}) building houses 318 students.

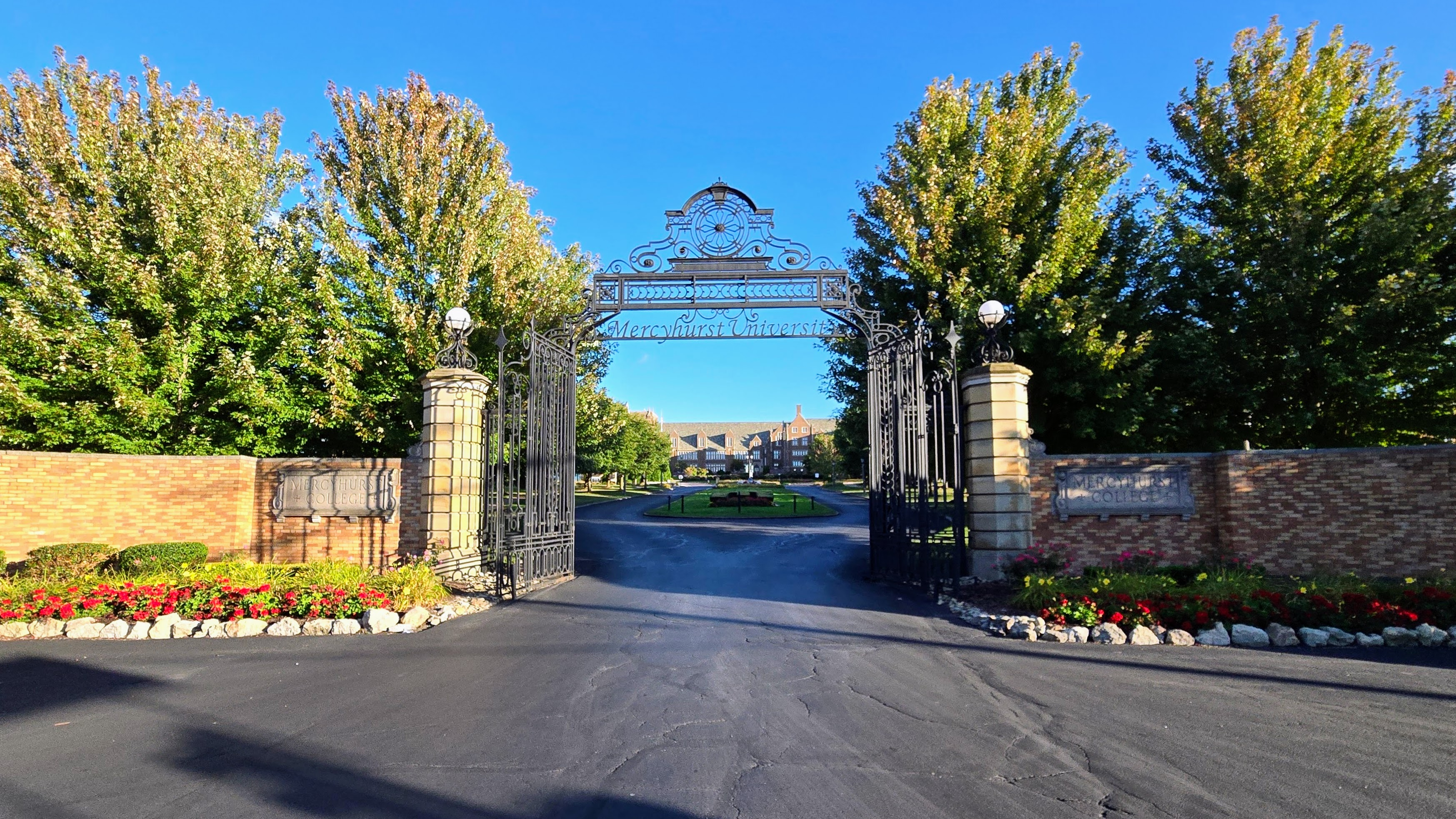
The main entrance gate on E 38th St. with Old Main in the background

On January 25, 2012, Mercyhurst College officially became Mercyhurst University.

In September 2012, the Center for Academic Engagement opened, a four-story, 31,000-square-foot (2,900 m^{2}) building that is set into a rolling hill north of Hammermill Library and features a skywalk over East Main Drive to connect the two facilities. The building, which boasts many green technologies, houses classrooms and lab space for two of Mercyhurst's signature programs — Intelligence Studies and Hospitality Management — as well as the Evelyn Lincoln Institute for Ethics and Society and the Mercyhurst Center for Applied Politics (MCAP).

On May 19, 2015, the Board of Trustees of Mercyhurst University appointed Michael T. Victor as the 12th president of Mercyhurst University. Victor had served as president of Lake Erie College since 2006. Victor served as dean of the Walker School of Business at Mercyhurst from 2002 to 2006. He took office on August 3, 2015.

On August 16, 2018, Mercyhurst University opened a US$25 million residence hall. Ryan Hall houses more than 350 student suites. It also includes a dining hall, lounge area, convenience store, and a 150-seat banquet hall.

=== Sexual assault allegations (2004) ===
On October 10, 2004, the Erie Times-News published a story stating that former president William Garvey had molested grade school boys while serving as a basketball coach at St. John the Baptist Catholic Church in Erie. The article further stated that "two current Erie residents told the Erie Times-News that Garvey paid them to have sex with him in the early to mid-1980s, when both men were minors".

On December 17, 2004, the paper reported that Garvey "abruptly announced his retirement Thursday, months before the completion of a college-ordered investigation Garvey had predicted would exonerate him".

A few months after Garvey retired, an investigation conducted by retired Erie County Judge Michael Palmisano, at the instruction of the board of trustees, determined that the allegations against Garvey "appear[ed] to have merit".

The campus' central park was once named "Garvey Park" in honor of Garvey, but following the allegations, it was renamed to "Trinity Green".

== Campus ==
The university formerly had a branch campus located 18 miles (29 km) away in North East, Pennsylvania at the site of the former St. Mary's Seminary. It offered associate degrees but was closed at the end of the 2020–2021 academic year.

The university has also operated Mercyhurst Corry, a school offering an associate degree in business administration, for over 25 years.

The university's fifth campus, Mercyhurst West, was located in Girard, Pennsylvania, at the site of the former Faith Lutheran Church. Classes began at this location in fall 2006. Due to low enrollment, the campus closed at the end of the 2013–2014 school year.

== Academics ==
Enrollment at Mercyhurst University's Erie campus is nearly 4,500 students. The university was formerly on a trimester calendar, but moved to a 4–1–4 calendar for the 2013–2014 school year. Currently, the university is on a traditional semester calendar.

The university has more than 57 undergraduate degrees, and almost 25 percent of the student body chooses to study abroad.

Undergraduate students at Mercyhurst all complete the REACH curriculum, which stands for Reason and Faith, Expression and Creativity, Analytical Thought, Contexts and Systems, and Humans in Connection.

The university is organized into four colleges:

- The Hafenmaier College of Humanities, Arts, and Social Sciences
- The Walker College of Business
- The Zurn College of Natural and Health Sciences
- The Ridge College of Intelligence Studies & Applied Sciences

== Athletics ==
Mercyhurst University competes in the Northeast Conference for most of their NCAA Division I sports since the 2024/2025 season.

Men's and women's ice hockey compete in Atlantic Hockey America and water polo competes in the Collegiate Water Polo Association.

Around 15 percent of the student body consists of student-athletes.

=== National championships ===
- 1976: Men's tennis – NAIA
- 2004: Women's rowing (team champion) – NCAA Division II
- 2005: Men's rowing (4+ open) – ECAC National Champion
- 2009: Josh Shields (165 lbs), wrestling – NCAA Division II
- 2010: Women's rowing (8+ champion) – NCAA Division II
- 2011: Men's lacrosse – NCAA Division II
- 2016: Men's Lightweight Rowing: Dad Vail Champions (Lightweight 8+)
- 2021: Women's rowing: Dad Vail Champions (8+ open)
- 2021: Women's rowing: Dad Vail Champions (4+ open)
- 2022: Women rowing: Dad Vail Champions (8+ open)
- 2022: Women's rowing (8+ open Champion) - NCAA Division II
- 2022: Women's rowing (4+ open Champion) - NCAA Division II
- 2022: Women's rowing (team champion) - NCAA Division II

== Partnership in Ireland ==
Dungarvan in Ireland is the sister city of Erie.

MU ran several Global Intelligence Forum in Dungarvan during the 2010s.

Each spring, MU students and faculty spend a term in Dungarvan as part of MU's Study Abroad scheme.

MU has established its first international base in Dungarvan; the base includes MU's European Centre for Intelligence Research, Analytics and Training.

== Alumni ==
- Meghan Agosta, Olympic ice hockey player
- Dan Altavilla, professional baseball player
- Polly Bukta, politician
- Joan Chittister, author and member of the Benedictine Sisters of Erie, Pennsylvania
- John Reilly Costello, professional baseball player
- John Deasy, politician
- James "Buster" Douglas, professional boxer
- Mary Celine Fasenmyer, mathematician and member of the Sisters of Mercy
- Pat Harkins, politician
- Matthew Hatchette, professional football player
- Rob Keefe, professional football coach
- David Emmer Lee, professional baseball player
- David Lough, professional baseball player
- Anthony Maher, professional soccer player
- Mike McLellan, professional lacrosse player
- Patrick Merrill, professional lacrosse player
- Robert Merski, politician
- Terry Smith, professional basketball player
- Brandon Staley, professional football coach
